= 2011 Dubai Tennis Championships – Women's doubles =

Women's doubles
- 2011 Dubai Tennis Championships

Final
- Champions: (United States) Liezel Huber (Spain) María José Martínez Sánchez
- Runners-up: (Czech Republic) Květa Peschke (Slovenia) Katarina Srebotnik
- Score: 7–6(5), 6–3

Events
| Singles | men | women |
| Doubles | men | women |
- Dubai Tennis Championships

Nuria Llagostera Vives and María José Martínez Sánchez were the defending champions, but decided not to participate together.
Llagostera Vives partnered up with Anastasia Rodionova, but they lost to Daniela Hantuchová and Agnieszka Radwańska in the first round.
Martínez Sánchez played alongside Liezel Huber and they ended up winning in the final against Květa Peschke and Katarina Srebotnik 7–6(5), 6–3.

== Seeds ==
The top four seeds receive a bye into the second round.

1. (Czech Republic) Květa Peschke / (Slovenia) Katarina Srebotnik (final)
2. (United States) Liezel Huber / (Spain) María José Martínez Sánchez (champions)
3. (Chinese Taipei) Chan Yung-jan / (China) Zheng Jie (second round)
4. (Belarus) Victoria Azarenka / (Russia) Maria Kirilenko (semifinals)
5. (Spain) Nuria Llagostera Vives / (Australia) Anastasia Rodionova (first round)
6. (United States) Bethanie Mattek-Sands / (United States) Meghann Shaughnessy (quarterfinals)
7. (United States) Lisa Raymond / (Australia) Samantha Stosur (quarterfinals)
8. (Switzerland) Timea Bacsinszky / (Czech Republic) Iveta Benešová (first round)

== Draw ==
Key

- Q = Qualifier
- WC = Wild card
- LL = Lucky loser
- Alt = Alternate
- ITF = ITF entry
- PR = Protected ranking
- SR = Special ranking
- SE = Special exempt
- JE = Junior exempt
- JR = Junior Accelerator Programme entrant
- CO = College Accelerator Programme entrant
- NG = Next Gen Accelerator Program entrant
- w/o = Walkover
- r = Retired
- d = Defaulted

=== Finals ===
Semifinals
1 | (Czech Republic) Květa Peschke (Slovenia) Katarina Srebotnik | 6 | 6
4 | (Belarus) Victoria Azarenka (Russia) Maria Kirilenko | 2 | 1
WC | (Russia) Svetlana Kuznetsova (Russia) Vera Zvonareva
2 | (United States) Liezel Huber (Spain) María José Martínez Sánchez | w/o

Final
1 | (Czech Republic) Květa Peschke (Slovenia) Katarina Srebotnik | 6^{5} | 3
2 | (United States) Liezel Huber (Spain) María José Martínez Sánchez | 7 | 6

=== Top half ===
First round
(Russia) V Dushevina (China) S Peng | 7 | 6
(Ukraine) K Bondarenko (Kazakhstan) Y Shvedova | 6^{5} | 1
(Italy) F Pennetta (Italy) F Schiavone | 6 | 4 | [10]
(Italy) S Errani (Italy) R Vinci | 4 | 6 | [6]
(Poland) K Jans (Poland) A Rosolska | 5 | 4
6 | (United States) B Mattek-Sands (United States) M Shaughnessy | 7 | 6
Alt | (Italy) A Brianti (China) S Zhang | 6^{5} | 6 | [8]
(Russia) A Kleybanova (China) Z Yan | 7 | 3 | [10]
(Romania) A Dulgheru (Tunisia) S Sfar | 6 | 6
(Russia) M Kondratieva (France) S Lefèvre | 3 | 0
(India) S Mirza (Russia) E Vesnina | 5 | 6 | [10]
8 | (Switzerland) T Bacsinszky (Czech Republic) I Benešová | 7 | 1 | [7]

Second round
1 | (Czech Republic) K Peschke (Slovenia) K Srebotnik | 7 | 6
(Russia) V Dushevina (China) S Peng | 5 | 2
(Italy) F Pennetta (Italy) F Schiavone
6 | (United States) B Mattek-Sands (United States) M Shaughnessy | w/o
4 | (Belarus) V Azarenka (Russia) M Kirilenko | 6 | 6
(Russia) A Kleybanova (China) Z Yan | 4 | 4
(Romania) A Dulgheru (Tunisia) S Sfar | 2 | 6 | [10]
(India) S Mirza (Russia) E Vesnina | 6 | 4 | [12]

Quarterfinals
1 | (Czech Republic) K Peschke (Slovenia) K Srebotnik | 6 | 6
6 | (United States) B Mattek-Sands (United States) M Shaughnessy | 2 | 4
4 | (Belarus) V Azarenka (Russia) M Kirilenko | 6 | 6
(India) S Mirza (Russia) E Vesnina | 4 | 2

Semifinals
1 | (Czech Republic) K Peschke (Slovenia) K Srebotnik | 6 | 6
4 | (Belarus) V Azarenka (Russia) M Kirilenko | 2 | 1

=== Bottom half ===
First round
5 | (Spain) N Llagostera Vives (Australia) A Rodionova | 2 | 6 | [6]
(Slovakia) D Hantuchová (Poland) A Radwańska | 6 | 4 | [10]
(Russia) V Diatchenko (Belarus) T Poutchek | 7 | 7
(Uzbekistan) A Amanmuradova (Belarus) D Kustova | 5 | 6^{1}
WC | (Oman) F Al-Nabhani (Portugal) M de Lattre | 2 | 1
WC | (Russia) S Kuznetsova (Russia) V Zvonareva | 6 | 6
7 | (United States) L Raymond (Australia) S Stosur | 6 | 6
(South Africa) N Grandin (Czech Republic) V Uhlířová | 4 | 3
(United States) R Kops-Jones (United States) A Spears | 4 | 1
(Romania) M Niculescu (Israel) S Pe'er | 6 | 6
(Australia) J Groth (Czech Republic) K Zakopalová | 6 | 6^{3} | [10]
WC | (Germany) K Barrois (Germany) T Malek | 4 | 7 | [5]

Second round
(Slovakia) D Hantuchová (Poland) A Radwańska | 6 | 6
(Russia) V Diatchenko (Belarus) T Poutchek | 1 | 1
WC | (Russia) S Kuznetsova (Russia) V Zvonareva | 6 | 7
3 | (Chinese Taipei) Y-j Chan (China) J Zheng | 3 | 5
7 | (United States) L Raymond (Australia) S Stosur | 7 | 5 | [10]
(Romania) M Niculescu (Israel) S Pe'er | 5 | 7 | [7]
(Australia) J Groth (Czech Republic) K Zakopalová | 4 | 4
2 | (United States) L Huber (Spain) MJ Martínez Sánchez | 6 | 6

Quarterfinals
(Slovakia) D Hantuchová (Poland) A Radwańska | 6^{7} | 4
WC | (Russia) S Kuznetsova (Russia) V Zvonareva | 7 | 6
7 | (United States) L Raymond (Australia) S Stosur | 3 | 6 | [7]
2 | (United States) L Huber (Spain) MJ Martínez Sánchez | 6 | 4 | [10]

Semifinals
WC | (Russia) S Kuznetsova (Russia) V Zvonareva
2 | (United States) L Huber (Spain) MJ Martínez Sánchez | w/o
