= 2012 Dubai Tennis Championships – Women's singles =

Women's singles
- 2012 Dubai Tennis Championships

Final
- Champion: (Poland) Agnieszka Radwańska
- Runner-up: (Germany) Julia Görges
- Score: 7–5, 6–4

Details
- Draw: 28
- Seeds: 8

Events
Singles	men	women
Doubles	men	women
- Dubai Tennis Championships

Agnieszka Radwańska defeated Julia Görges in the final, 7–5, 6–4 to win the women's singles tennis title at the 2012 Dubai Tennis Championships.

Caroline Wozniacki was the defending champion, but lost in the semifinals to Görges.

== Seeds ==
1. (Belarus) Victoria Azarenka (withdrew because of a left ankle injury)
2. (Czech Republic) Petra Kvitová (withdrew because of an illness)
3. (Denmark) Caroline Wozniacki (semifinals)
4. (Australia) Samantha Stosur (quarterfinals)
5. (Poland) Agnieszka Radwańska (champion)
6. (France) Marion Bartoli (first round)
7. (Italy) Francesca Schiavone (first round)
8. (Serbia) Jelena Janković (semifinals)
9. (Germany) Sabine Lisicki (quarterfinals)

== Draw ==
Key

- Q = Qualifier
- WC = Wild card
- LL = Lucky loser
- Alt = Alternate
- ITF = ITF entry
- PR = Protected ranking
- SR = Special ranking
- SE = Special exempt
- JE = Junior exempt
- JR = Junior Accelerator Programme entrant
- CO = College Accelerator Programme entrant
- NG = Next Gen Accelerator Program entrant
- w/o = Walkover
- r = Retired
- d = Defaulted

=== Finals ===
Semifinals
(Germany) Julia Görges	7^{7}	7
3	(Denmark) Caroline Wozniacki	6^{3}	5
8	(Serbia) Jelena Janković	2	6	0
5	(Poland) Agnieszka Radwańska	6	2	6

Final
(Germany) Julia Görges	5	4
5	(Poland) Agnieszka Radwańska	7	6

=== Top half ===
First round
(Germany) J Görges	2	7^{7}	6
(Russia) S Kuznetsova	6	6^{2}	4
(Slovakia) D Hantuchová	1	7	7^{7}
LL	(Slovenia) P Hercog	6	5	6^{4}
(China) S Peng	6	6
6	(France) M Bartoli	4	3
Q	(Romania) S Halep	6	6
(Russia) A Pavlyuchenkova	4	2
(Russia) M Kirilenko	6	6
(Romania) M Niculescu	3	0
(Serbia) A Ivanovic	6	7
7	(Italy) F Schiavone	1	5

Second round
LL	(Australia) C Dellacqua	0	2
(Germany) J Görges	6	6
(Slovakia) D Hantuchová	7	6
(China) S Peng	5	2
3	(Denmark) C Wozniacki	6	6
Q	(Romania) S Halep	2	3
(Russia) M Kirilenko	2	6^{4}
(Serbia) A Ivanovic	6	7^{7}

Quarterfinals
(Germany) J Görges	4	6	6
(Slovakia) D Hantuchová	6	3	4
3	(Denmark) C Wozniacki	6	7
(Serbia) A Ivanovic	3	5

Semifinals
(Germany) J Görges	7^{7}	7
3	(Denmark) C Wozniacki	6^{3}	5

=== Bottom half ===
First round
8	(Serbia) J Janković	6	6
(Czech Republic) P Cetkovská	2	2
(Spain) A Medina Garrigues	3	3
(Italy) F Pennetta	6	6
(Czech Republic) L Šafářová	6	5	6
Q	(Croatia) P Martić	3	7	3
5	(Poland) A Radwańska	6	6^{6}	7
Q	(Canada) A Wozniak	1	7^{8}	5
WC	(Oman) F Al Nabhani	3	1
WC	(Israel) S Pe'er	6	6
(Slovakia) D Cibulková	1^{r}
Q	(Czech Republic) I Benešová	3

Second round
8	(Serbia) J Janković	6	6
(Italy) F Pennetta	4	2
(Czech Republic) L Šafářová	1	7^{7}	1
4	(Australia) S Stosur	6	6^{5}	6
5	(Poland) A Radwańska	7	6
WC	(Israel) S Pe'er	5	4
Q	(Czech Republic) I Benešová	3	3
9	(Germany) S Lisicki	6	6

Quarterfinals
8	(Serbia) J Janković	6	6
4	(Australia) S Stosur	4	2
5	(Poland) A Radwańska	6	6
9	(Germany) S Lisicki	2	1

Semifinals
8	(Serbia) J Janković	2	6	0
5	(Poland) A Radwańska	6	2	6

== Qualifying ==
=== Seeds ===
1. (China) Zheng Jie (first round)
2. (Slovenia) Polona Hercog (qualifying competition, lucky loser)
3. (United States) Christina McHale (withdrew)
4. (Germany) Mona Barthel (qualifying competition)
5. (Spain) María José Martínez Sánchez (second round)
6. (South Africa) Chanelle Scheepers (first round)
7. (Czech Republic) Klára Zakopalová (first round)
8. (Austria) Tamira Paszek (first round)
9. (Czech Republic) Iveta Benešová (qualifier)

=== Qualifiers ===
1. (Romania) Simona Halep
2. (Canada) Aleksandra Wozniak
3. (Czech Republic) Iveta Benešová
4. (Croatia) Petra Martić

=== Lucky loser ===
1. (Slovenia) Polona Hercog
2. (Australia) Casey Dellacqua

=== Draw ===
==== First qualifier ====
First round
1	(China) Zheng Jie	3	6^{4}
WC	(Tunisia) Ons Jabeur	6	7^{7}
(Czech Republic) Barbora Záhlavová-Strýcová	6	1	4
(Netherlands) Arantxa Rus	2	6	6
(Russia) Alla Kudryavtseva	0	0
(Romania) Simona Halep	6	6
(Belarus) Anastasiya Yakimova	4	4
5	(Spain) María José Martínez Sánchez	6	6

Second round
WC	(Tunisia) Ons Jabeur	3	6	5
(Netherlands) Arantxa Rus	6	2	7
(Romania) Simona Halep	6	6
5	(Spain) María José Martínez Sánchez	1	1

Qualifying competition
(Netherlands) Arantxa Rus	2	2
(Romania) Simona Halep	6	6

==== Second qualifier ====
First round
2	(Slovenia) Polona Hercog	6	2	6
WC	(France) Kristina Mladenovic	2	6	1
(Germany) Kristina Barrois	2	6	2
(France) Virginie Razzano	6	4	6
WC	(India) Sania Mirza	6	3	2
(Canada) Aleksandra Wozniak	2	6	6
(Ukraine) Kateryna Bondarenko	5	6	6
6	(South Africa) Chanelle Scheepers	7	4	2

Second round
2	(Slovenia) Polona Hercog	6	0
(France) Virginie Razzano	2	0^{r}
(Canada) Aleksandra Wozniak	6^{5}	6	6
(Ukraine) Kateryna Bondarenko	7^{7}	3	1

Qualifying competition
2	(Slovenia) Polona Hercog	7^{10}	6^{4}	3
(Canada) Aleksandra Wozniak	6^{8}	7^{7}	6

==== Third qualifier ====
First round
9	(Czech Republic) Iveta Benešová	6	6
WC	(France) Caroline Garcia	2	3
(Russia) Elena Vesnina	4	3
(Greece) Eleni Daniilidou	6	6
(Japan) Ayumi Morita	6	6
Alt	(Japan) Misaki Doi	4	3
(Australia) Casey Dellacqua	6	1	6
7	(Czech Republic) Klára Zakopalová	4	6	2

Second round
9	(Czech Republic) Iveta Benešová	6	6
(Greece) Eleni Daniilidou	3	2
(Japan) Ayumi Morita	0	3
(Australia) Casey Dellacqua	6	6

Qualifying competition
9	(Czech Republic) Iveta Benešová	6	7
(Australia) Casey Dellacqua	1	5

==== Fourth qualifier ====
First round
4	(Germany) Mona Barthel	6	6
(United Kingdom) Anne Keothavong	3	2
(Serbia) Bojana Jovanovski	6	7
Alt	(Japan) Kurumi Nara	4	5
(Croatia) Petra Martić	6	6
(France) Iryna Brémond	0	1
(Australia) Anastasia Rodionova	6	6
8	(Austria) Tamira Paszek	4	4

Second round
4	(Germany) Mona Barthel	4	7^{7}	7
(Serbia) Bojana Jovanovski	6	6^{3}	5
(Croatia) Petra Martić	6	6
(Australia) Anastasia Rodionova	2	3

Qualifying competition
4	(Germany) Mona Barthel	4	4
(Croatia) Petra Martić	6	6
