= 2011 Dubai Tennis Championships – Women's singles =

Event at a sports competition

Women's singles
- 2011 Dubai Tennis Championships

Final
- Champion: (Denmark) Caroline Wozniacki
- Runner-up: (Russia) Svetlana Kuznetsova
- Score: 6–1, 6–3

Details
- Draw: 56
- Seeds: 16

Events
Singles	men	women
Doubles	men	women
- Dubai Tennis Championships

Caroline Wozniacki defeated Svetlana Kuznetsova in the final, 6–1, 6–3 to win the women's singles tennis title at the 2011 Dubai Tennis Championships. Although Wozniacki had lost the world No. 1 singles ranking to Kim Clijsters the previous week, she reclaimed the spot by defeating Shahar Pe'er in the quarterfinals.

Venus Williams was the two-time reigning champion, but withdrew before the tournament due to injury.

== Seeds ==
The top eight seeds received a bye into the second round.

1. (Denmark) Caroline Wozniacki (champion)
2. (Russia) Vera Zvonareva (third round)
3. (Italy) Francesca Schiavone (third round)
4. (Australia) Samantha Stosur (quarterfinals)
5. (China) Li Na (second round)
6. (Serbia) Jelena Janković (semifinals)
7. (Belarus) Victoria Azarenka (third round)
8. (Poland) Agnieszka Radwańska (quarterfinals)
9. (Israel) Shahar Pe'er (quarterfinals)
10. (France) Marion Bartoli (third round)
11. (Italy) Flavia Pennetta (semifinals)
12. (Estonia) Kaia Kanepi (third round)
13. (Czech Republic) Petra Kvitová (first round)
14. (Serbia) Ana Ivanovic (first round)
15. (Russia) Alisa Kleybanova (quarterfinals)
16. (Russia) Svetlana Kuznetsova (final)

Note: Anastasia Pavlyuchenkova, who would have been the 10th seed, entered late and played the qualifying tournament. She was not seeded in the main draw. She was eliminated in the first round.

== Draw ==
Key

- Q = Qualifier
- WC = Wild card
- LL = Lucky loser
- Alt = Alternate
- ITF = ITF entry
- PR = Protected ranking
- SR = Special ranking
- SE = Special exempt
- JE = Junior exempt
- JR = Junior Accelerator Programme entrant
- CO = College Accelerator Programme entrant
- NG = Next Gen Accelerator Program entrant
- w/o = Walkover
- r = Retired
- d = Defaulted

=== Finals ===
Quarterfinals
1	(Denmark) Caroline Wozniacki	6	6
9	(Israel) Shahar Pe'er	2	4
4	(Australia) Samantha Stosur	3	7	6^{4}
6	(Serbia) Jelena Janković	6	5	7
8	(Poland) Agnieszka Radwańska	6^{7}	3
16	(Russia) Svetlana Kuznetsova	7	6
11	(Italy) Flavia Pennetta	6	6
15	(Russia) Alisa Kleybanova	2	0

Semifinals
1	(Denmark) Caroline Wozniacki	7	6
6	(Serbia) Jelena Janković	5	3
16	(Russia) Svetlana Kuznetsova	6	6
11	(Italy) Flavia Pennetta	4	4

Final
1	(Denmark) Caroline Wozniacki	6	6
16	(Russia) Svetlana Kuznetsova	1	3

=== Top half ===
==== Section 1 ====
First round
(Russia) A Chakvetadze	6	6
(Slovakia) D Hantuchová	1	3
(Uzbekistan) A Amanmuradova	3	1
WC	(India) S Mirza	6	6
Q	(Japan) A Morita	7	7
13	(Czech Republic) P Kvitová	6^{2}	6^{3}
9	(Israel) S Pe'er	6	6
(Spain) MJ Martínez Sánchez	4	1
(Romania) A Dulgheru	7	6
(United Kingdom) E Baltacha	6^{3}	4
(Belgium) Y Wickmayer	7	3	6
WC	(Serbia) B Jovanovski	5	6	2

Second round
1	(Denmark) C Wozniacki	6	3
(Russia) A Chakvetadze	1	5^{r}
WC	(India) S Mirza	4	2
Q	(Japan) A Morita	6	6
9	(Israel) S Pe'er	6	6
(Romania) A Dulgheru	4	2
(Belgium) Y Wickmayer	6^{6}	7	6
5	(China) N Li	7	6^{6}	2

Third round
1	(Denmark) C Wozniacki	6	6
Q	(Japan) A Morita	1	0
9	(Israel) S Pe'er	3	6	6
(Belgium) Y Wickmayer	6	4	1

Quarterfinals
1	(Denmark) C Wozniacki	6	6
9	(Israel) S Pe'er	2	4

==== Section 2 ====
First round
(Italy) S Errani	6	6
Q	(Slovakia) Z Kučová	1	4
Q	(Germany) K Barrois	3	6	4
(China) J Zheng	6	2	6
(Switzerland) P Schnyder	4	7	6
14	(Serbia) A Ivanovic	6	6^{2}	2
12	(Estonia) K Kanepi	6	6
(Russia) V Dushevina	1	2
(Germany) A Petkovic	6	4	6
(Germany) A Kerber	4	6	3
Q	(South Africa) C Scheepers	6	6
(Russia) M Kirilenko	2	2

Second round
4	(Australia) S Stosur	6	6
(Italy) S Errani	0	1
(China) J Zheng	6	0	2
(Switzerland) P Schnyder	1	6	6
12	(Estonia) K Kanepi	6	3	6
(Germany) A Petkovic	3	6	3
Q	(South Africa) C Scheepers	2	3
6	(Serbia) J Janković	6	6

Third round
4	(Australia) S Stosur	6	6
(Switzerland) P Schnyder	3	4
12	(Estonia) K Kanepi	6	3	5
6	(Serbia) J Janković	2	6	7

Quarterfinals
4	(Australia) S Stosur	3	7	6^{4}
6	(Serbia) J Janković	6	5	7

=== Bottom half ===
==== Section 3 ====
First round
(Latvia) A Sevastova	6	5	6
(Australia) A Rodionova	1	7	3
(Switzerland) T Bacsinszky	6	3	6
(Czech Republic) I Benešová	3	6	1
(Japan) K Date-Krumm	6^{8}	4
10	(France) M Bartoli	7	6
16	(Russia) S Kuznetsova	6	6
Q	(Spain) N Llagostera Vives	4	2
(Russia) E Makarova	5	3
(Bulgaria) T Pironkova	7	6
Q	(China) S Zhang	6	6
(Kazakhstan) Y Shvedova	3	4

Second round
8	(Poland) A Radwańska	7	6
(Latvia) A Sevastova	5	4
(Switzerland) T Bacsinszky	6	4	1
10	(France) M Bartoli	3	6	6
16	(Russia) S Kuznetsova	5	6	6
(Bulgaria) T Pironkova	7	2	4
Q	(China) S Zhang	3	1
3	(Italy) F Schiavone	6	6

Third round
8	(Poland) A Radwańska	6	6
10	(France) M Bartoli	3	2
16	(Russia) S Kuznetsova	1	6	7
3	(Italy) F Schiavone	6	0	5

Quarterfinals
8	(Poland) A Radwańska	6^{7}	3
16	(Russia) S Kuznetsova	7	6

==== Section 4 ====
First round
Q	(China) S Peng	6	2	6
(United States) B Mattek-Sands	3	6	3
(Czech Republic) K Zakopalová	6	6
(Czech Republic) L Šafářová	2	2
WC	(Australia) J Dokić	2	2
11	(Italy) F Pennetta	6	6
15	(Russia) A Kleybanova	4	6	6
Q	(Russia) A Pavlyuchenkova	6	4	0
(Australia) J Groth	7	6
(Slovakia) D Cibulková	6^{5}	2
(Italy) R Vinci	6	6
(Russia) E Vesnina	4	3

Second round
7	(Belarus) V Azarenka	4	6	7
Q	(China) S Peng	6	2	6^{5}
(Czech Republic) K Zakopalová	7	1	2
11	(Italy) F Pennetta	5	6	6
15	(Russia) A Kleybanova	6	6
(Australia) J Groth	4	3
(Italy) R Vinci	3	1
2	(Russia) V Zvonareva	6	6

Third round
7	(Belarus) V Azarenka	3	7	4
11	(Italy) F Pennetta	6	6^{2}	6
15	(Russia) A Kleybanova	6	6
2	(Russia) V Zvonareva	3	2

Quarterfinals
11	(Italy) F Pennetta	6	6
15	(Russia) A Kleybanova	2	0
