= 2012 Dubai Tennis Championships =

- Date: 27 February – 3 March (men); 20 – 25 February (women)
- Edition: 20th (men) / 12th (women)
- Category: ATP World Tour 500; WTA Premier event
- Surface: Hard / outdoor
- Location: Dubai, United Arab Emirates
- Venue: Aviation Club Tennis Centre

Champions

Men's singles
- (Switzerland) Roger Federer

Women's singles
- (Poland) Agnieszka Radwańska

Men's doubles
- (India) Mahesh Bhupathi / (India) Rohan Bopanna

Women's doubles
- (United States) Liezel Huber / (United States) Lisa Raymond
- Dubai Tennis Championships

The 2012 Dubai Tennis Championships (also known as the 2012 Dubai Duty Free Tennis Championships for sponsorship reasons) was a 500 event on the 2012 ATP World Tour and a Premier event on the 2012 WTA Tour. Both of the events took place at the Aviation Club Tennis Centre in Dubai, United Arab Emirates. The women's tournament took place from February 20 to February 25, 2012, while the men's tournament took place from 27 February to 3 March 2012. Roger Federer and Agnieszka Radwańska won the singles titles.

== Finals ==
=== Men's singles ===
(Switzerland) Roger Federer defeated (United Kingdom) Andy Murray, 7–5, 6–4

- It was Federer's 2nd title of the year and 72nd of his career. It was his 5th win at Dubai, also winning in 2003, 2004, 2005, and 2007.

=== Women's singles ===
(Poland) Agnieszka Radwańska defeated (Germany) Julia Görges, 7–5, 6–4

- It was Radwańska's 1st title of the year and 8th of her career. It was her 2nd Premier-level tournament of her career and 4th Premier overall.

=== Men's doubles ===
(India) Mahesh Bhupathi / (India) Rohan Bopanna defeated (Poland) Mariusz Fyrstenberg / (Poland) Marcin Matkowski, 6–4, 3–6, [10–5]

=== Women's doubles ===
(United States) Liezel Huber / (United States) Lisa Raymond defeated (India) Sania Mirza / (Russia) Elena Vesnina, 6–2, 6–1

== ATP singles main draw entrants ==
=== Seeds ===
Country	Player	Rank^{1}	Seed
SRB	Novak Djokovic	1	1
SUI	Roger Federer	3	2
GBR	Andy Murray	4	3
FRA	Jo-Wilfried Tsonga	6	4
CZE	Tomáš Berdych	7	5
USA	Mardy Fish	8	6
SRB	Janko Tipsarević	9	7
ARG	Juan Martín del Potro	10	8

- ^{1} Rankings as of February 20, 2012

=== Other entrants ===
The following players received wildcards into the singles main draw:

- (United Arab Emirates) Omar Awadhy
- (Ukraine) Sergei Bubka
- (Serbia) Marko Djokovic

The following players received entry from the qualifying draw:

- (Germany) Michael Berrer
- (Switzerland) Marco Chiudinelli
- (Kazakhstan) Andrey Golubev
- (Slovakia) Lukáš Lacko

=== Retirements ===
- (France) Richard Gasquet (illness)

== ATP doubles main draw entrants ==
=== Seeds ===
Country	Player	Country	Player	Rank^{1}	Seed
FRA	Michaël Llodra	SRB	Nenad Zimonjić	11	1
SWE	Robert Lindstedt	ROU	Horia Tecău	17	2
POL	Mariusz Fyrstenberg	POL	Marcin Matkowski	24	3
IND	Mahesh Bhupathi	IND	Rohan Bopanna	26	4

- ^{1} Rankings are as of February 20, 2012

=== Other entrants ===
The following pairs received wildcards into the doubles main draw:

- (Turkey) Marsel İlhan / (Tunisia) Malek Jaziri
- (Kuwait) Mohammed Ghareeb / (Kuwait) Abdullah Maqdas

== WTA singles main draw entrants ==
=== Seeds ===
Country	Player	Rank^{1}	Seed
~~BLR~~	~~Victoria Azarenka~~	~~1~~	~~1~~
~~CZE~~	~~Petra Kvitová~~	~~3~~	~~2~~
DEN	Caroline Wozniacki	4	3
AUS	Samantha Stosur	5	4
POL	Agnieszka Radwańska	6	5
FRA	Marion Bartoli	7	6
ITA	Francesca Schiavone	11	7
SRB	Jelena Janković	13	8
GER	Sabine Lisicki	14	9

- ^{1} Rankings as of February 13, 2012

=== Other entrants ===
The following players received wildcards into the main draw:

- (Oman) Fatma Al Nabhani
- (Israel) Shahar Pe'er

The following players received entry from the qualifying draw:

- (Czech Republic) Iveta Benešová
- (Romania) Simona Halep
- (Croatia) Petra Martić
- (Canada) Aleksandra Wozniak

The following players received entry as lucky loser:

- (Slovenia) Polona Hercog
- (Australia) Casey Dellacqua

=== Withdrawals ===
- (Belarus) Victoria Azarenka (left ankle injury)
- (Czech Republic) Petra Kvitová (illness)
- (China) Li Na (lower back injury)
- (Russia) Vera Zvonareva

=== Retirements ===
- (Slovakia) Dominika Cibulková (right hamstring strain)

== ATP doubles main draw entrants ==
=== Seeds ===
Country	Player	Country	Player	Rank^{1}	Seed
USA	Liezel Huber	USA	Lisa Raymond	3	1
IND	Sania Mirza	RUS	Elena Vesnina	15	2
SVK	Daniela Hantuchová	POL	Agnieszka Radwańska	37	3
ESP	Nuria Llagostera Vives	AUS	Anastasia Rodionova	50	4

- ^{1} Rankings are as of February 13, 2012

=== Other entrants ===
The following pairs received wildcards into the doubles main draw:

- (Oman) Fatma Al Nabhani / (Slovenia) Andreja Klepač
- (Australia) Casey Dellacqua / (Australia) Samantha Stosur
- (Italy) Flavia Pennetta / (Italy) Francesca Schiavone

=== Retirements ===
- (Russia) Maria Kirilenko (acute neck injury)
