= 2011 Dubai Tennis Championships – Men's doubles =

Men's doubles
- 2011 Dubai Tennis Championships

Final
- Champions: (Ukraine) Sergiy Stakhovsky (Russia) Mikhail Youzhny
- Runners-up: (France) Jérémy Chardy (Spain) Feliciano López
- Score: 4–6, 6–3, [10–3]

Details
- Draw: 16
- Seeds: 4

Events
Singles	men	women
Doubles	men	women
← 2010 ·	Dubai Tennis Championships	· 2012 →

Simon Aspelin and Paul Hanley were the defending champions; however, Aspelin decided not to participate.
As a result, Hanley partnered up with Lukáš Dlouhý. They were eliminated by Sergiy Stakhovsky and Mikhail Youzhny in the quarterfinals.
Stakhovsky and Youzhny won this tournament, by defeating Jérémy Chardy and Feliciano López 4–6, 6–3, [10–3] in the final.

== Seeds ==
1. (India) Mahesh Bhupathi / (India) Leander Paes (quarterfinals)
2. (Poland) Mariusz Fyrstenberg / (Poland) Marcin Matkowski (first round)
3. (France) Michaël Llodra / (Serbia) Nenad Zimonjić (semifinals)
4. (Czech Republic) Lukáš Dlouhý / (Australia) Paul Hanley (quarterfinals)

== Draw ==
=== Key ===
- Q = Qualifier
- WC = Wild card
- LL = Lucky loser
- Alt = Alternate
- SE = Special exempt
- PR = Protected ranking
- ITF = ITF entry
- JE = Junior exempt
- w/o = Walkover
- r = Retired
- d = Defaulted
- SR = Special ranking

=== Draw ===
First round
1	(India) M Bhupathi (India) L Paes	6	6
WC	(Serbia) M Djokovic (Serbia) N Djokovic	4	1
WC	(Oman) M Al Nabhani (United Arab Emirates) O Alawadhi	0	6	[6]
(Spain) M Granollers (Belgium) D Norman	6	3	[10]
4	(Czech Republic) L Dlouhý (Australia) P Hanley	4	6	[10]
(Croatia) I Ljubičić (Croatia) L Zovko	6	3	[8]
(Ukraine) S Stakhovsky (Russia) M Youzhny	6	6
(Spain) G García-López (Spain) M López	1	4
(Czech Republic) T Berdych (Germany) P Kohlschreiber	4	1
(Germany) F Mayer (Germany) P Petzschner	6	6
(Kazakhstan) A Golubev (Italy) A Seppi	3	5
3	(France) M Llodra (Serbia) N Zimonjić	6	7
(Finland) J Nieminen (Serbia) V Troicki	5	6	[7]
(India) R Bopanna (Pakistan) A-u-H Qureshi	7	3	[10]
(France) J Chardy (Spain) F López	3	6	[10]
2	(Poland) M Fyrstenberg (Poland) M Matkowski	6	2	[6]

Quarterfinals
1	(India) M Bhupathi (India) L Paes	6^{5}	4
(Spain) M Granollers (Belgium) D Norman	7	6
4	(Czech Republic) L Dlouhý (Australia) P Hanley	6	4	[3]
(Ukraine) S Stakhovsky (Russia) M Youzhny	3	6	[10]
(Germany) F Mayer (Germany) P Petzschner	3	4
3	(France) M Llodra (Serbia) N Zimonjić	6	6
(India) R Bopanna (Pakistan) A-u-H Qureshi	4	6	[7]
(France) J Chardy (Spain) F López	6	3	[10]

Semifinals
(Spain) M Granollers (Belgium) D Norman	3	4
(Ukraine) S Stakhovsky (Russia) M Youzhny	6	6
3	(France) M Llodra (Serbia) N Zimonjić	7	6^{5}	[8]
(France) J Chardy (Spain) F López	6^{6}	7	[10]

Final
(Ukraine) S Stakhovsky (Russia) M Youzhny	4	6	[10]
(France) J Chardy (Spain) F López	6	3	[3]
