= 2011 Dubai Tennis Championships – Men's singles =

Men's singles
- 2011 Dubai Tennis Championships

Final
- Champion: (Serbia) Novak Djokovic
- Runner-up: (Switzerland) Roger Federer
- Score: 6–3, 6–3

Details
- Draw: 32
- Seeds: 8

Events
Singles	men	women
Doubles	men	women
- Dubai Tennis Championships

Two-time defending champion Novak Djokovic defeated Roger Federer in the final, 6–3, 6–3 to win the men's singles tennis title at the 2011 Dubai Tennis Championships. It was Djokovic's second title of the season, after his triumph at the 2011 Australian Open, and 20th of his career. Djokovic joined Federer as the only two men to have won the tournament at least three times.

== Seeds ==
1. (Switzerland) Roger Federer (final)
2. (Serbia) Novak Djokovic (champion)
3. (Czech Republic) Tomáš Berdych (semifinals, retired due to a left quadriceps injury)
4. (Russia) Mikhail Youzhny (first round)
5. (Croatia) Ivan Ljubičić (first round, retired due to a leg injury)
6. (Serbia) Viktor Troicki (first round)
7. (Cyprus) Marcos Baghdatis (first round, retired due to illness)
8. (Latvia) Ernests Gulbis (second round)

== Draw ==
Key

- Q = Qualifier
- WC = Wild card
- LL = Lucky loser
- Alt = Alternate
- ITF = ITF entry
- PR = Protected ranking
- SR = Special ranking
- SE = Special exempt
- JE = Junior exempt
- JR = Junior Accelerator Programme entrant
- CO = College Accelerator Programme entrant
- NG = Next Gen Accelerator Program entrant
- w/o = Walkover
- r = Retired
- d = Defaulted

=== Finals ===
Semifinals
1	(Switzerland) Roger Federer	6	7
(France) Richard Gasquet	2	5
3	(Czech Republic) Tomáš Berdych	7	2	2^{r}
2	(Serbia) Novak Djokovic	6^{5}	6	4

Final
1	(Switzerland) Roger Federer	3	3
2	(Serbia) Novak Djokovic	6	6

=== Top half ===
First round
1	(Switzerland) R Federer	6	6
WC	(India) S Devvarrman	3	3
(Spain) M Granollers	6	6
(Russia) D Tursunov	1	3
(Ukraine) S Stakhovsky	6	6
WC	(United Arab Emirates) O Alawadhi	4	2
WC	(Germany) M Berrer	3	4
8	(Latvia) E Gulbis	6	6
4	(Russia) M Youzhny	3	5
(France) G Simon	6	7
Q	(Czech Republic) L Rosol	7	6
Q	(Slovakia) K Beck	6^{2}	3
Q	(Bulgaria) G Dimitrov	2	4
(France) R Gasquet	6	6
Q	(Ukraine) S Bubka	6	0
5	(Croatia) I Ljubičić	1	1	r

Second round
1	(Switzerland) R Federer	6	6
(Spain) M Granollers	3	4
(Ukraine) S Stakhovsky	6	5	6
8	(Latvia) E Gulbis	3	7	1
(France) G Simon	6	6
Q	(Czech Republic) L Rosol	2	3
(France) R Gasquet	6	7
Q	(Ukraine) S Bubka	2	5

Quarterfinals
1	(Switzerland) R Federer	6	6
(Ukraine) S Stakhovsky	3	4
(France) G Simon	7	2	4
(France) R Gasquet	5	6	6

Semifinals
1	(Switzerland) R Federer	6	7
(France) R Gasquet	2	5

=== Bottom half ===
First round
6	(Serbia) V Troicki	1	6^{2}
(Germany) P Kohlschreiber	6	7
(Italy) A Seppi	6	6^{2}	2
(Germany) P Petzschner	3	7	6
(Russia) N Davydenko	6	6
(Spain) G García-López	2	0
(France) J Chardy	2	3
3	(Czech Republic) T Berdych	6	6
7	(Cyprus) M Baghdatis	0	r
(Kazakhstan) A Golubev	4
(Germany) F Mayer	6	6
(Finland) J Nieminen	4	2
(Spain) F López	5
(Chinese Taipei) Y-h Lu	0	r
(France) M Llodra	3	3
2	(Serbia) N Djokovic	6	6

Second round
(Germany) P Kohlschreiber	0	6	2
(Germany) P Petzschner	6	4	6
(Russia) N Davydenko	3	6^{5}
3	(Czech Republic) T Berdych	6	7
(Kazakhstan) A Golubev	3	4
(Germany) F Mayer	6	6
(Spain) F López	3	6	4
2	(Serbia) N Djokovic	6	2	6

Quarterfinals
(Germany) P Petzschner	5	4
3	(Czech Republic) T Berdych	7	6
(Germany) F Mayer	5	1
2	(Serbia) N Djokovic	7	6

Semifinals
3	(Czech Republic) T Berdych	7	2	2^{r}
2	(Serbia) N Djokovic	6^{5}	6	4
