= 2012 Dubai Tennis Championships – Men's singles =

Men's singles
- 2012 Dubai Tennis Championships

Final
- Champion: (Switzerland) Roger Federer
- Runner-up: (United Kingdom) Andy Murray
- Score: 7–5, 6–4

Details
- Draw: 32
- Seeds: 8

Events
Singles	men	women
Doubles	men	women
- Dubai Tennis Championships

Novak Djokovic was the three-time defending champion, but lost in the semifinals to Andy Murray.
Roger Federer won his fifth Dubai title, defeating Murray 7–5, 6–4 in the final. He did not lose a single set in the entire tournament.

== Seeds ==
1. (Serbia) Novak Djokovic (semifinals)
2. (Switzerland) Roger Federer (champion)
3. (United Kingdom) Andy Murray (final)
4. (France) Jo-Wilfried Tsonga (quarterfinals)
5. (Czech Republic) Tomáš Berdych (quarterfinals)
6. (United States) Mardy Fish (second round)
7. (Serbia) Janko Tipsarević (quarterfinals)
8. (Argentina) Juan Martín del Potro (semifinals)

== Draw ==
Key

- Q = Qualifier
- WC = Wild card
- LL = Lucky loser
- Alt = Alternate
- ITF = ITF entry
- PR = Protected ranking
- SR = Special ranking
- SE = Special exempt
- JE = Junior exempt
- JR = Junior Accelerator Programme entrant
- CO = College Accelerator Programme entrant
- NG = Next Gen Accelerator Program entrant
- w/o = Walkover
- r = Retired
- d = Defaulted

=== Finals ===
Semifinals
1	(Serbia) Novak Djokovic	2	5
3	(United Kingdom) Andy Murray	6	7
8	(Argentina) Juan Martín del Potro	6^{5}	6^{6}
2	(Switzerland) Roger Federer	7^{7}	7^{8}

Final
3	(United Kingdom) Andy Murray	5	4
2	(Switzerland) Roger Federer	7	6

=== Top half ===
First round
1	(Serbia) N Djokovic	6	6
(Germany) C-M Stebe	4	2
(Ukraine) S Stakhovsky	6	6
WC	(United Arab Emirates) O Alawadhi	1	2
(Croatia) I Ljubičić	2	5
(Italy) F Cipolla	6	7
(Russia) I Kunitsyn	2	2
7	(Serbia) J Tipsarević	6	6
3	(United Kingdom) A Murray	6	4	6
Q	(Germany) M Berrer	3	6	4
(Russia) N Davydenko	4	7	4
Q	(Switzerland) M Chiudinelli	6	5	6
Q	(Slovakia) L Lacko	2	6	7^{16}
WC	(Ukraine) S Bubka	6	2	6^{14}
PR	(Germany) B Becker	2	2
5	(Czech Republic) T Berdych	6	6

Second round
1	(Serbia) N Djokovic	7^{7}	6
(Ukraine) S Stakhovsky	6^{5}	3
(Italy) F Cipolla	7^{7}	1	1
7	(Serbia) J Tipsarević	6^{2}	6	6
3	(United Kingdom) A Murray	6	6
Q	(Switzerland) M Chiudinelli	3	4
Q	(Slovakia) L Lacko	1	2
5	(Czech Republic) T Berdych	6	6

Quarterfinals
1	(Serbia) N Djokovic	6	7^{8}
7	(Serbia) J Tipsarević	1	6^{6}
3	(United Kingdom) A Murray	6	7
5	(Czech Republic) T Berdych	3	5

Semifinals
1	(Serbia) N Djokovic	2	5
3	(United Kingdom) A Murray	6	7

=== Bottom half ===
First round
8	(Argentina) JM del Potro	6	7^{7}
(Ukraine) A Dolgopolov	3	6^{5}
Q	(Kazakhstan) A Golubev	6	6
WC	(Serbia) M Djokovic	3	2
(France) A Mannarino	2	2
(Czech Republic) L Rosol	6	6
(Cyprus) M Baghdatis	6^{2}	4
4	(France) J-W Tsonga	7^{7}	6
6	(United States) M Fish	6	6
(Germany) A Beck	1	1
(Russia) M Youzhny	6	0
(France) R Gasquet	3	0^{r}
(France) N Mahut	4	4
(Spain) F López	6	6
(France) M Llodra	0	6^{6}
2	(Switzerland) R Federer	6	7^{8}

Second round
8	(Argentina) JM del Potro	6	6
Q	(Kazakhstan) A Golubev	4	2
(Czech Republic) L Rosol	3	4
4	(France) J-W Tsonga	6	6
6	(United States) M Fish	2	6^{0}
(Russia) M Youzhny	6	7^{7}
(Spain) F López	5	3
2	(Switzerland) R Federer	7	6

Quarterfinals
8	(Argentina) JM del Potro	7^{7}	6
4	(France) J-W Tsonga	6^{1}	2
(Russia) M Youzhny	3	4
2	(Switzerland) R Federer	6	6

Semifinals
8	(Argentina) JM del Potro	6^{5}	6^{6}
2	(Switzerland) R Federer	7^{7}	7^{8}

== Qualifying ==
=== Seeds ===
1. (Slovakia) Lukáš Lacko (qualified)
2. (Tunisia) Malek Jaziri (qualifying competition)
3. (Japan) Tatsuma Ito (qualifying competition)
4. (Turkey) Marsel İlhan (first round)
5. (Germany) Michael Berrer (qualified)
6. (South Africa) Rik de Voest (first round)
7. (Slovenia) Grega Žemlja (qualifying competition)
8. (Kazakhstan) Andrey Golubev (qualified)

=== Qualifiers ===
1. (Slovakia) Lukáš Lacko
2. (Kazakhstan) Andrey Golubev
3. (Germany) Michael Berrer
4. (Switzerland) Marco Chiudinelli

=== Draw ===
==== First qualifier ====
First round
1	(Slovakia) Lukáš Lacko	6	7^{7}
Alt	(United Arab Emirates) Abdullah Maqdas	2	6^{1}
(Germany) Dominik Meffert	2	4
7	(Slovenia) Grega Žemlja	6	6

Qualifying competition
1	(Slovakia) Lukáš Lacko	6	6
7	(Slovenia) Grega Žemlja	4	4

==== Second qualifier ====
First round
2	(Tunisia) Malek Jaziri	6	6
WC	(Oman) Mohammed Al-Nabhani	1	2
(Kazakhstan) Yuri Schukin	1	2
8	(Kazakhstan) Andrey Golubev	6	6

Qualifying competition
2	(Tunisia) Malek Jaziri	3	6	3
8	(Kazakhstan) Andrey Golubev	6	0	6

==== Third qualifier ====
First round
3	(Japan) Tatsuma Ito	6	6
WC	(United Arab Emirates) Hamad Abbas Janahi	1	2
WC	(United States) Rajeev Ram	3	3
5	(Germany) Michael Berrer	6	6

Qualifying competition
3	(Japan) Tatsuma Ito	6^{10}	6^{3}
5	(Germany) Michael Berrer	7^{12}	7^{7}

==== Fourth qualifier ====
First round
4	(Turkey) Marsel İlhan	4	6	3
(Spain) Arnau Brugués-Davi	6	4	6
(Switzerland) Marco Chiudinelli	6	6
6	(South Africa) Rik de Voest	4	1

Qualifying competition
(Spain) Arnau Brugués-Davi	5	4
(Switzerland) Marco Chiudinelli	7	6
