= 2012 Dubai Tennis Championships – Women's doubles =

Women's doubles
- 2012 Dubai Tennis Championships

Final
- Champion: (United States) Liezel Huber (United States) Lisa Raymond
- Runner-up: (India) Sania Mirza (Russia) Elena Vesnina
- Score: 6–2, 6–1

Events
Singles	men	women
Doubles	men	women
- Dubai Tennis Championships

Liezel Huber and María José Martínez Sánchez are the defending champions but chose not to participate together. Huber played with Lisa Raymond as the first seed while Martínez Sánchez played with Shahar Pe'er.
Liezel Huber and Lisa Raymond won the title, defeating Sania Mirza and Elena Vesnina 6–2, 6–1 in the final.

== Seeds ==
1. (United States) Liezel Huber / (United States) Lisa Raymond (champions)
2. (India) Sania Mirza / (Russia) Elena Vesnina (final)
3. (Slovakia) Daniela Hantuchová / (Poland) Agnieszka Radwańska (first round)
4. (Spain) Nuria Llagostera Vives / (Australia) Anastasia Rodionova (semifinals)

== Draw ==
Key

- Q = Qualifier
- WC = Wild card
- LL = Lucky loser
- Alt = Alternate
- ITF = ITF entry
- PR = Protected ranking
- SR = Special ranking
- SE = Special exempt
- JE = Junior exempt
- JR = Junior Accelerator Programme entrant
- CO = College Accelerator Programme entrant
- NG = Next Gen Accelerator Program entrant
- w/o = Walkover
- r = Retired
- d = Defaulted

=== Draw ===
First round
1	(United States) L Huber (United States) L Raymond	3	6	[10]
(Germany) J Görges (China) J Zheng	6	4	[5]
(Spain) A Medina Garrigues (Poland) A Rosolska
(Germany) S Lisicki (Russia) M Kirilenko	w/o
4	(Spain) N Llagostera Vives (Australia) An Rodionova	1	6	[10]
(South Africa) N Grandin (Czech Republic) V Uhlířová	6	1	[6]
(United States) R Kops-Jones (United States) A Spears	3	7^{7}	[10]
WC	(Italy) F Pennetta (Italy) F Schiavone	6	6^{2}	[6]
(Czech Republic) I Benešová (Czech Republic) B Záhlavová-Strýcová	6	6
(Poland) K Jans-Ignacik (Russia) A Kudryavtseva	1	2
(Chinese Taipei) S-w Hsieh (China) S Peng	6	6
3	(Slovakia) D Hantuchová (Poland) A Radwańska	3	4
(Spain) MJ Martínez Sánchez (Israel) S Pe'er	6^{4}	6	[10]
WC	(Australia) C Dellacqua (Australia) S Stosur	7^{7}	1	[5]
WC	(Oman) F Al-Nabhani (Slovenia) A Klepač	1	3
2	(India) S Mirza (Russia) E Vesnina	6	6

Quarterfinals
1	(United States) L Huber (United States) L Raymond	6	6
(Spain) A Medina Garrigues (Poland) A Rosolska	3	3
4	(Spain) N Llagostera Vives (Australia) A Rodionova	6	2	[12]
(United States) R Kops-Jones (United States) A Spears	3	6	[10]
(Czech Republic) I Benešová (Czech Republic) B Záhlavová-Strýcová	3	6	[5]
(Chinese Taipei) S-w Hsieh (China) S Peng	6	2	[10]
(Spain) MJ Martínez Sánchez (Israel) S Pe'er	1	6	[8]
2	(India) S Mirza (Russia) E Vesnina	6	4	[10]

Semifinals
1	(United States) L Huber (United States) L Raymond	6	6
4	(Spain) N Llagostera Vives (Australia) A Rodionova	3	2
(Chinese Taipei) S-w Hsieh (China) S Peng	2	7^{7}	[11]
2	(India) S Mirza (Russia) E Vesnina	6	6^{5}	[13]

Final
1	(United States) L Huber (United States) L Raymond	6	6
2	(India) S Mirza (Russia) E Vesnina	2	1
