= 2012 Dubai Tennis Championships – Men's doubles =

Men's doubles
- 2012 Dubai Tennis Championships

Final
- Champions: (India) Mahesh Bhupathi (India) Rohan Bopanna
- Runners-up: (Poland) Mariusz Fyrstenberg (Poland) Marcin Matkowski
- Score: 6–4, 3–6, [10–5]

Details
- Draw: 16
- Seeds: 4

Events
Singles	men	women
Doubles	men	women
← 2011 ·	Dubai Tennis Championships	· 2013 →

Sergiy Stakhovsky and Mikhail Youzhny were the defending champions but decided not to participate together. Stakhovsky plays alongside Michael Kohlmann, while Youzhny partners up with Marcos Baghdatis. Both pairs, however, lost in the quarterfinals and first round, respectively, to Mariusz Fyrstenberg and Marcin Matkowski.
Mahesh Bhupathi and Rohan Bopanna defeated Fyrstenberg and Matkowski 6–4, 3–6, [10–5] in the final to win the title.

== Seeds ==
1. (France) Michaël Llodra / (Serbia) Nenad Zimonjić (quarterfinals)
2. (Sweden) Robert Lindstedt / (Romania) Horia Tecău (quarterfinals)
3. (Poland) Mariusz Fyrstenberg / (Poland) Marcin Matkowski (final)
4. (India) Mahesh Bhupathi / (India) Rohan Bopanna (champions)

== Draw ==
=== Key ===
- Q = Qualifier
- WC = Wild card
- LL = Lucky loser
- Alt = Alternate
- SE = Special exempt
- PR = Protected ranking
- ITF = ITF entry
- JE = Junior exempt
- w/o = Walkover
- r = Retired
- d = Defaulted
- SR = Special ranking

=== Draw ===
First round
1	(France) M Llodra (Serbia) N Zimonjić	6	6
WC	(Turkey) M İlhan (Tunisia) M Jaziri	1	3
WC	(Kuwait) M Ghareeb (Kuwait) A Maqdas	4	1
(Austria) J Knowle (Austria) A Peya	6	6
4	(India) M Bhupathi (India) R Bopanna	6	7
(Czech Republic) L Dlouhý (Ukraine) A Dolgopolov	4	5
(Pakistan) A-u-H Qureshi (Netherlands) J-J Rojer	6	6^{12}	[6]
(Australia) P Hanley (United Kingdom) J Murray	4	7^{14}	[10]
(Germany) M Kohlmann (Ukraine) S Stakhovsky	7	6
(United States) J Cerretani (Croatia) I Ljubičić	5	4
(Cyprus) M Baghdatis (Russia) M Youzhny	2	5
3	(Poland) M Fyrstenberg (Poland) M Matkowski	6	7
(Israel) J Erlich (Israel) A Ram	6	7
(United States) S Lipsky (United States) R Ram	3	5
(India) L Paes (Serbia) J Tipsarević	4	5
2	(Sweden) R Lindstedt (Romania) H Tecău	6	7

Quarterfinals
1	(France) M Llodra (Serbia) N Zimonjić	6^{3}	6^{2}
(Austria) J Knowle (Austria) A Peya	7^{7}	7^{7}
4	(India) M Bhupathi (India) R Bopanna	6	6
(Australia) P Hanley (United Kingdom) J Murray	3	3
(Germany) M Kohlmann (Ukraine) S Stakhovsky	6^{4}	3
3	(Poland) M Fyrstenberg (Poland) M Matkowski	7^{7}	6
(Israel) J Erlich (Israel) A Ram	6	6
2	(Sweden) R Lindstedt (Romania) H Tecău	1	2

Semifinals
(Austria) J Knowle (Austria) A Peya	6^{2}	6^{7}
4	(India) M Bhupathi (India) R Bopanna	7^{7}	7^{9}
3	(Poland) M Fyrstenberg (Poland) M Matkowski	6	3	[10]
(Israel) J Erlich (Israel) A Ram	4	6	[4]

Final
4	(India) M Bhupathi (India) R Bopanna	6	3	[10]
3	(Poland) M Fyrstenberg (Poland) M Matkowski	4	6	[5]
