= 2011 Dubai Tennis Championships =

- Date: 21–27 February (men); 14–20 February (women)
- Edition: 19th (men) / 11th (women)
- Category: ATP World Tour 500; WTA Premier 5 event
- Location: Dubai, United Arab Emirates
- Venue: Aviation Club Tennis Centre

Champions

Men's singles
- (Serbia) Novak Djokovic

Women's singles
- (Denmark) Caroline Wozniacki

Men's doubles
- (Ukraine) Sergiy Stakhovsky / (Russia) Mikhail Youzhny

Women's doubles
- (United States) Liezel Huber / (Spain) María José Martínez Sánchez
- Dubai Tennis Championships

Official Logo of the 2011 Dubai Tennis Championships

The 2011 Dubai Tennis Championships (also known as the 2011 Dubai Duty Free Tennis Championships for sponsorship reasons) was a 500 Series event on the 2011 ATP World Tour and a Premier 5 event on the 2011 WTA Tour. Both of the events took place at the Aviation Club Tennis Centre in Dubai, United Arab Emirates. The women's tournament took place from February 14 to February 20, 2011, while the men's tournament took place from 21 February until 27 February 2011. Novak Djokovic and Caroline Wozniacki won the singles titles.

== Finals ==
=== Men's singles ===
(Serbia) Novak Djokovic defeated (Switzerland) Roger Federer, 6–3, 6–3

- It was Djokovic's 2nd title of the year and 20th of his career. It was his 3rd consecutive Dubai title.

=== Women's singles ===
(Denmark) Caroline Wozniacki defeated (Russia) Svetlana Kuznetsova, 6–1, 6–3.

- It was Wozniacki's 1st title of the year and 13th of her career. It was her 1st Premier 5 title of the year and 3rd of her career.

=== Men's doubles ===
(Ukraine) Sergiy Stakhovsky / (Russia) Mikhail Youzhny defeated (France) Jérémy Chardy / (Spain) Feliciano López, 4–6, 6–3, [10–3]

=== Women's doubles ===
(United States) Liezel Huber / (Spain) María José Martínez Sánchez defeated (Czech Republic) Květa Peschke / (Slovenia) Katarina Srebotnik, 7–6(5), 6–3.

== ATP entrants ==
=== Seeds ===
| Country | Player | Rank^{1} | Seed |
|---|---|---|---|
| SUI | Roger Federer | 2 | 1 |
| SRB | Novak Djokovic | 3 | 2 |
| CZE | Tomáš Berdych | 7 | 3 |
| RUS | Mikhail Youzhny | 11 | 4 |
| CRO | Ivan Ljubičić | 14 | 5 |
| SRB | Viktor Troicki | 19 | 6 |
| CYP | Marcos Baghdatis | 21 | 7 |
| LAT | Ernests Gulbis | 22 | 8 |

- ^{1} Rankings are as of February 14, 2011.

=== Other entrants ===
The following players received wildcards into the main draw:

- (United Arab Emirates) Omar Awadhy
- (Germany) Michael Berrer
- (India) Somdev Devvarman

The following players received entry from the qualifying draw:

- (Slovakia) Karol Beck
- (Ukraine) Sergei Bubka
- (Bulgaria) Grigor Dimitrov
- (Czech Republic) Lukáš Rosol

== WTA entrants ==
=== Seeds ===
| Country | Player | Rank^{1} | Seed |
|---|---|---|---|
| DEN | Caroline Wozniacki | 1 | 1 |
| RUS | Vera Zvonareva | 3 | 2 |
| ITA | Francesca Schiavone | 4 | 3 |
| AUS | Samantha Stosur | 5 | 4 |
| CHN | Li Na | 7 | 5 |
| SRB | Jelena Janković | 8 | 6 |
| BLR | Victoria Azarenka | 9 | 7 |
| POL | Agnieszka Radwańska | 10 | 8 |
| ISR | Shahar Pe'er | 11 | 9 |
| FRA | Marion Bartoli | 15 | 10 |
| ITA | Flavia Pennetta | 16 | 11 |
| EST | Kaia Kanepi | 17 | 12 |
| CZE | Petra Kvitová | 18 | 13 |
| SRB | Ana Ivanovic | 19 | 14 |
| RUS | Alisa Kleybanova | 22 | 15 |
| RUS | Svetlana Kuznetsova | 23 | 16 |

- ^{1} Rankings are as of February 7, 2011.

=== Other entrants ===
The following players received wildcards into the main draw:

- (Australia) Jelena Dokić
- (Serbia) Bojana Jovanovski
- (India) Sania Mirza

The following players received entry from the qualifying draw:

- (Germany) Kristina Barrois
- (Slovakia) Zuzana Kučová
- (Spain) Nuria Llagostera Vives
- (Japan) Ayumi Morita
- (Russia) Anastasia Pavlyuchenkova
- (China) Peng Shuai
- (South Africa) Chanelle Scheepers
- (China) Zhang Shuai
