= Elena Vesnina =

Russian tennis player (born 1986)

Elena Vesnina Елена Веснина
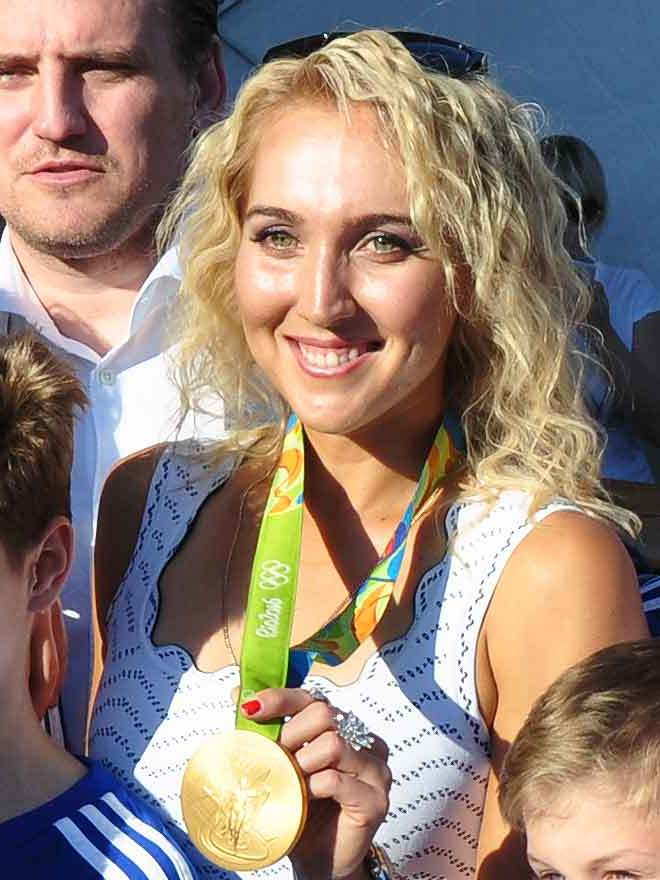
- Vesnina with her Olympic gold medal in 2016
- Full name: Elena Sergeyevna Vesnina
- Country (sports): Russia
- Residence: Sochi, Russia
- Born: 1 August 1986 (age 39) Lviv, Ukrainian SSR, Soviet Union
- Height: 1.74 m (5 ft 9 in)
- Turned pro: 2002
- Retired: 2024
- Plays: Right-handed (two-handed backhand)
- Coach: Eugenia Maniokova
- Prize money: US$ 13,052,758

Singles
- Career record: 419–341
- Career titles: 3
- Highest ranking: No. 13 (20 March 2017)

Grand Slam singles results
- Australian Open: 4R (2006, 2013)
- French Open: 3R (2015, 2017, 2021)
- Wimbledon: SF (2016)
- US Open: 3R (2009, 2014, 2016, 2017)

Other tournaments

Doubles
- Career record: 437–234
- Career titles: 19
- Highest ranking: No. 1 (11 June 2018)

Grand Slam doubles results
- Australian Open: F (2014, 2018)
- French Open: W (2013)
- Wimbledon: W (2017)
- US Open: W (2014)

Other doubles tournaments
- Tour Finals: W (2016)
- Olympic Games: W (2016)

Grand Slam mixed doubles results
- Australian Open: W (2016)
- French Open: F (2021)
- Wimbledon: F (2011, 2012)
- US Open: SF (2011)

Team competitions
- Fed Cup: W (2007, 2008), record 14–8
Medal record
Olympic Games
Gold medal – first place	2016 Rio de Janeiro	Doubles
Silver medal – second place	2020 Tokyo	Mixed doubles
Universiade
Gold medal – first place	2013 Kazan	Doubles
Gold medal – first place	2013 Kazan	Mixed doubles
Silver medal – second place	2013 Kazan	Team
- Last updated on: 12 November 2024.

Elena Sergeyevna Vesnina (Note: Еле́на Серге́евна Веснина́; IPA: [jɪˈlʲɛnə vʲɪsnʲɪˈna]) (born 1 August 1986) is a Russian former professional tennis player who was world No. 1 in doubles. Vesnina is a four-time Grand Slam champion, having won the 2013 French Open, 2014 US Open, and 2017 Wimbledon Championships in women's doubles with compatriot Ekaterina Makarova, and the 2016 Australian Open in mixed doubles, partnering Bruno Soares. She reached also eight further finals in women's doubles, and four in mixed doubles.

She became world No. 1 for the first time in June 2018, alongside Makarova, with the pair jointly holding the top ranking for the next five weeks. Vesnina won 19 doubles titles on WTA Tour, including the 2016 WTA Finals and eight at WTA 1000-level.

She also achieved significant success in singles, reaching her career-high ranking of world No. 13 in March 2017. Vesnina won three WTA singles titles, including the 2017 Indian Wells Open, and achieved her best Grand Slam result at the 2016 Wimbledon Championships, reaching the semifinals.

She has represented Russia in the Billie Jean King Cup since 2006, winning the competition in 2007 and 2008, and competed at the Olympic Games on four occasions. Makarova and Vesnina won the gold medal at the 2016 Rio Olympics, and Vesnina also won mixed-doubles silver with Aslan Karatsev at the 2020 Tokyo Olympics.

== Personal life ==
Vesnina was born to Sergey and teacher Irina. Her grandfather is of Greek descent. She has a younger brother, Dmitry, a former junior tennis player. She started playing tennis aged seven in the sports school in Sochi.

In November 2015, Vesnina married businessman Pavel Tabuntsov. They have two daughters. Their first daughter, Elizaveta, was born on 19 November 2018. Their second daughter Anna was born in 2023.

== Career ==
=== 2002–2003 ===
In October 2002, aged 16 years and two months, Vesnina gained direct entry into the qualifying draw for her first $10k tournament at Giza, Egypt and qualified for the main draw before losing a three-set match. The next week, again qualifying at Al-Mansoura to enter the main draw, where she won two further matches, beating Hana Šromová of the Czech Republic in the second round, to reach her first $10k quarterfinal in her second event played. However, she defaulted her quarterfinal tie to her opponent.

In 2003, Vesnina began the year entering two successive ITF Circuit events in India, at Chennai and Bangalore, and qualified both times, but also reached her first semifinal and another quarterfinal in the main draws, losing to Akgul Amanmuradova at the quarterfinal stage at Bangalore. These results gave Vesnina her first ranking at world No. 750, enough to gain direct entry to her next $10k draw at Istanbul, where she beat her personal best result in reaching the final. The following week, at Antalya, she was knocked out in the first round by her then-compatriot Evgenia Linetskaya; and in May she met with mixed results in Lviv, Ukraine and Warsaw, Poland; but in June, she won the $10k event at Balashikha.

After taking her career-first ITF title, Vesnina competed in Bucharest losing to Raluca Sandu in the second round. She stayed there to compete at Bucharest, where she made it through the finals losing to German Antonela Voina in two sets. She then competed in Zhukovsky, Russia as a qualifier and succeeded, then won through all the way to the semifinal of the main draw with a tight three-set quarterfinal victory over compatriot Ekaterina Bychkova en route, but was stopped in the semifinals by Alona Bondarenko of Ukraine.

In the middle of September, Vesnina qualified for her second straight $25k tournament at Tbilisi, Georgia, and this time won the title, recording victories over Evgenia Linetskaya, Olga Barabanschikova, and Mariya Koryttseva, in the quarterfinal, semifinal and final respectively. She then failed to qualify, trying to get to for first main-draw appearance at the WTA Tour in her next two events in Moscow and Tashkent. She finished the year ranked No. 279.

=== 2004–2005 ===
Vesnina began the year with a second-round exit at the ITF event in Bergamo. She then failed to qualify for the ITF Ortisei, exiting at the first round of the qualifying draw. She also lost in first qualifying round of the 2004 Hyderabad Open to an unranked Barbara Schwartz. At St. Petersburg, she got past the qualifying round and then defeated compatriot Anastasia Rodionova in the first round proper on her way to a quarterfinal finish, where she was defeated by Ivana Lisjak of Croatia.

Vesnina next played in June at Marseille, falling at the last round of the qualifying draw she was granted a lucky loser before bowing out to No. 1 seed and then world No. 70, Ľubomíra Kurhajcová. She then made early exits in Gorizia and Vittel. Following this, she reached two ITF quarterfinals in a row, in Moscow losing to Maria Kondratieva, and in Balashikha losing to Anastasiya Yakimova. In late September, as a direct main-draw entrant into the $50k tournament at Batumi, Georgia, she also reached the quarterfinals, where she lost to No. 1 seed Anna Chakvetadze.

In her next events, Vesnina tried to qualify for a WTA Tour-level Kremlin Cup but was knocked out at the second hurdle by world No. 61, Claudine Schaul, and in the Bell Challenge where she succeeded for the first time in winning through qualifying into a WTA tournament main draw but lost in the first round of the main draw to Mariana Díaz Oliva. Vesnina then qualified in Opole, Poland, but lost to Hana Šromová in the second-round. She ended the year by reaching the quarterfinal at Bergamo, losing to Estonian star Maret Ani. Vesnina ended the year ranked No. 286.

She started 2005 attempting to make headway in WTA Tour main draws and next entered the qualifying round of the Cellular South Cup but lost in straight sets to Varvara Lepchenko. The following week, she lost to Tatsiana Uvarova in the second qualifying round of an ITF tournament at St. Paul, Minnesota. Extending her bad start, she made a first-round exit at the ITF St. Petersburg; she then qualified at Civitavecchia, reaching the semifinals before losing to Maret Ani in three sets. In May, she entered qualifying for the Tier II event at Warsaw, and avenged her previous defeat by Adriana Barna, knocking her out but then fell again to Anna Chakvetadze in the second round.

A couple of weeks later, Vesnina suffered a disappointing first-round loss to Olivia Sanchez of France in the first round of a $25k event at Antalya. The following week, she qualified for her second career WTA Tour main draw at the İstanbul Cup losing to Mashona Washington, in the second round after her first WTA Tour match win. Returning in June, she reached the final of an event at Galatina, Italy, defeating higher-ranked Tatiana Poutchek on the way, before losing the title to Mariya Koryttseva. At her next two ITF tournaments in early July, she failed to qualify in Fano while losing to similarly ranked compatriot Lioudmila Skavronskaia in the first round in Cuneo, Italy. But later that month, she qualified for her third career WTA Tour main draw at Modena, in the first round she cruised past a low-ranked special entrant from Maja Matevžič before being ousted by world No. 28, Flavia Pennetta, in second round.

The very next week, Vesnina won through qualifying into a WTA main draw for the fourth time at Palermo but lost Maret Ani in the first round. In her next three events, she failed to qualify for the main draw of the WTA events at the Nordic Light Open losing to Emma Laine in the third round of the qualifying draw, in the Rogers Cup where she first beat Swiss perennial and world No. 110, Emmanuelle Gagliardi, but then was ousted by world No. 93, Rika Fujiwara, and in the US Open to Marina Erakovic in the second round of the qualifying draw. She then reached the semifinals in Denain, France, losing to Arantxa Parra Santonja, and in Bordeaux losing to Stéphanie Foretz. Vesnina attained direct entry to a main draw for the first time in her career in October at the Tashkent Open, where she reached her first quarterfinal losing to Akgul Amanmuradova. She then failed to qualify at the Kremlin Cup losing to Alona Bondarenko. In the Generali Ladies Linz, she came through the qualifying round before losing to Tamira Paszek.

In November at the Bell Challenge, Vesnina reached her second quarterfinal losing to 75th-ranked Sofia Arvidsson. In the next two weeks, she came unstuck in early rounds of ITF events, losing to Emma Laine in the first round at Pittsburgh, Philadelphia, and to Kaia Kanepi in the second round at Deauville, France. She ended the year with a semifinal appearance at Poitiers in the final week of November and her last tournament, losing to Viktoriya Kutuzova (en route she beat Marion Bartoli and world No. 96, Stéphanie Foretz). She ended the year ranked No. 111.

=== 2006 ===
Beginning the new season at the Brisbane International, Vesnina was defeated by Puerto Rican world No. 157, Vilmarie Castellvi, in the first round of the qualifying draw for the Tier III event at Gold Coast, and then she was beaten by Nuria Llagostera Vives in the first round of the Hobart International the following week.

Being ranked No. 100, she was awarded direct entry into her first ever Grand Slam tournament at the Australian Open, and reached the fourth round with defeats of qualifiers Li Ting, Julia Schruff and Olga Savchuk before losing to world No. 7, Nadia Petrova. She next competed at the Bangalore Open and Indian Wells Open but lost in the first rounds of both contests, losing to Australian world No. 127, Nicole Pratt, at Bangalore and to world No. 86, Viktoriya Kutuzova, at Indian Wells. However, she reached the third round at Miami and Amelia Island losing to Tatiana Golovin and Virginia Ruano Pascual, respectively.

The week after, playing at Family Circle Cup, Vesnina again came out the loser this time against fellow-Russian Vera Zvonareva. In May, retreating to a lower-level Tier-IV event at Estoril, Portugal, she encountered Flavia Pennetta, the first seed in the draw, in the first round; and this time the Italian wrought her revenge. At the Berlin Open, she lost to Czech Květa Peschke in the first round.

At the Internationaux de Strasbourg, Vesnina encountered fierce resistance in the first round from upcoming Italian world No. 249, Karin Knapp, but finally defeated her to book her place in the second round, where she beat world No. 27, Marion Bartoli, for the second time in her career. In the quarterfinals, clay-court expert and world No. 28, Anabel Medina Garrigues, had the better of their joust, taking it. At the French Open, she lost to Peng Shuai in the first round.

Vesnina entered the grass-court circuit in Birmingham and 's-Hertogenbosch, and both reaching the second round losing to world No. 39, Mara Santangelo, and world No. 8, Elena Dementieva, respectively. In July, entering Wimbledon Championships ranked No. 63, she recovered from a set down to fend off world No. 75, María Sánchez Lorenzo, in the first round, and then second round she lost compatriot Anna Chakvetadze.

At the Carlsbad Open and LA Tennis Championships, Vesnina reached the second round of both events, losing to Emma Laine and Meghann Shaughnessy, respectively. At the qualifying round of the Rogers Cup, she was upset by Neha Uberoi of the United States in the first round. The following week at Forest Hills Classic, she lost to Shaughnessy at the quarterfinal stage. In September, in her first appearance at the US Open, she lost to world No. 14, Mary Pierce, in the first round.

At the China Open, in the first round, Vesnina at last wreaked revenge upon Emma Laine after a lengthy struggle, but then in the second she fell to world No. 23, Li Na. A string of three further moderate second-round finishes in successive weeks followed in the earlier part of October at the Guangzhou International Open losing to veteran Israeli Tzipora Obziler, at the Tashkent Open losing to Kateryna Bondarenko, in Kremlin Cup losing to Amélie Mauresmo.

After qualifying for the Ladies Linz, Vesnina got past the first round of the main draw against world No. 16, Daniela Hantuchová, after the Slovak retired. World No. 12, Jelena Janković, awaited her in round two, and it was Janković who emerged victorious. In her last tournament at Gaz de France Stars, she retired against Kirsten Flipkens. Vesnina finished the year still ranked 44th in the world, up 67 places year-on-year.

=== 2007 ===
In her first tournament of the year at the MAW Hardcourts, Vesnina reached the quarterfinals losing to Italian Tathiana Garbin. The following week, at the Hobart International, she lost to Medina Garrigues in the first round. At the Australian Open, she avenged that loss in the first round, but lost in the second to Maria Elena Camerin, in a very close three-set match. Following the Australian Open, then proceeded to suffer a string of disappointing first-round exits over the remainder of the winter season, including at the Pan Pacific Open and at Dubai, losing seven straight matches in a row. Her losing streak ended in the hands of Urszula Radwańska in the first round of the J&S Cup, but she lost in the next to Jelena Janković. At the German Open a week later, she suffered a heavy loss by 65th-ranked Spaniard Lourdes Domínguez Lino in the first round.

In her next main-draw appearance, Vesnina reached the quarterfinals at the Internationaux de Strasbourg, she lost to Marion Bartoli. At the French Open, she was drawn against No. 1 seed and eventual champion Justine Henin in the first round, and lost. The following week, at the Rosmalen Open, she got through as a qualifier but lost in the second round to Angelique Kerber. Entering Wimbledon Championships world-ranked 67th in July, she had successive wins over fellow-Russian world No. 32, Olga Puchkova, in the first round and world No. 43, Émilie Loit, in the second, before losing once again to top-seed and eventual semifinalist Justine Henin, in the third round. Following Wimbledon she competed at the Cincinnati Open where she reached the quarterfinals losing to eventual champion and compatriot Anna Chakvetadze, until retiring.

At the Nordic Light Open, Vesnina defeated world No. 109, Sofia Arvidsson, in straight sets in the first round, but then lost to fast-rising teenager Caroline Wozniacki, in the second. She then competed in the last tournament before the US Open at the Forest Hills Classic, after receiving a first-round bye, she began well with victories over world No. 68, Séverine Brémond, and Japanese world No. 52, Aiko Nakamura, to reach her career-first WTA-level semifinal, but then lost to Virginie Razzano. Entering the US Open, Vesnina was drawn to play world No. 89 Jelena Kostanić in the first round, but lost to her in straight sets.

The following week, representing Russia in the 2007 Fed Cup final against Italy, Vesnina avenged her straight sets defeat by Mara Santangelo in their only previous meeting, by outplaying world No. 34 to win in straight sets herself. Towards the end of the month, the Russian could reach only the second round of the Slovenia Open before she succumbed to Gisela Dulko.

Returning to the Tashkent Open in October ranked 61st in the world, Vesnina reached the semifinals with victories over Alberta Brianti, Tatiana Poutchek, and Romanian youngster Ioana Raluca Olaru, but at this stage, she lost Belarusian teenager Victoria Azarenka. At the Kremlin Cup, she lost once again to Czech world No. 13, Nicole Vaidišová, in the second round. At her last two tournaments of the year were the Zurich Open and Linz Open she failed to qualify, losing to American Meilen Tu and German Sandra Klösel. She ended the year at No. 54, ten spots lower than the previous year.

=== 2008 ===
Back in Australia for the beginning of the new season early in January, Vesnina suffered a poor start with a three-set loss in the first round at Gold Coast to an Australian wild card then ranked just 158th in the world, Monique Adamczak. Having failed to defend the points accrued from her quarterfinal finish at Gold Coast a year previously, she found her ranking slipping to 60th. But she mostly made up for it by reaching the quarterfinals at Hobart the following week with wins over world No. 48, Akiko Morigami, and Nuria Llagostera Vives. But her quarterfinal opponent, world No. 23 Vera Zvonareva, had the better of her.

Entering the Australian Open for the third year running, now ranked 55th, Vesnina enjoyed a marginally more successful run than she had done in 2007, in reaching the third round with successive wins over world No. 31, Julia Vakulenko, and world No. 98, Jill Craybas. However, there was no stopping eventual champion Maria Sharapova in the third round. Vesnina emerged from the tournament ranked No. 52.

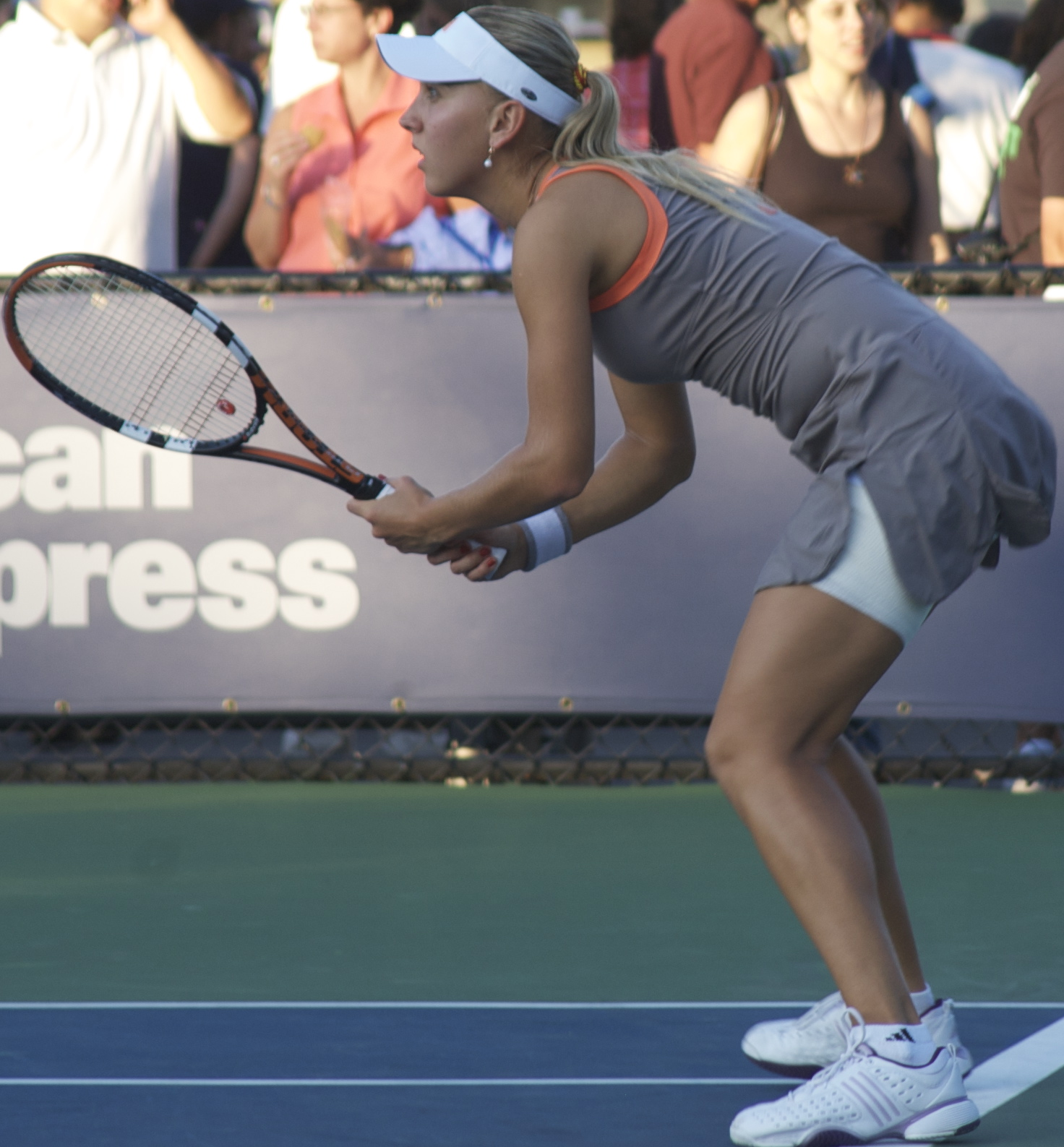
Vesnina at the 2008 US Open

Vesnina's challenge began disappointingly for her at Doha in mid-February with a first-round main-draw loss in straight sets to world No. 134, Ayumi Morita. Then at the Tier II tournament at Dubai, she was forced to go through the qualifying tournament, where she was defeated in the second round by Zheng Jie, whose then-current ranking of world No. 226 reflected her recent absence from the tour resulting from injury. The sum total of the ranking points earned by the Russian in February was just six.

Returning to action in mid-March at the Tier I fixture taking place at Indian Wells, Vesnina could manage only the second round of the main draw after defeating world No. 98, Hsieh Su-wei, in a close three-set match in the first, as world No. 10, Marion Bartoli, vanquished her, leveling up their career head-to-head at two matches all.

Arriving at Miami at the end of March ranked 53rd, Vesnina reached the fourth round with wins over Elena Likhovtseva, world No. 18 Ágnes Szávay, and improved world No. 60, Ashley Harkleroad, before succumbing to world No. 1, Justine Henin. The 70 ranking points she earned from this performance lifted her within the top 50 again at No. 45, with 638 ranking points, but still left her some 50 points adrift of the current standard required to match her previous best ranking of 41st.

At the Tier-II Amelia Island in early April, Vesnina reached the third round after defeating Venezuelan Milagros Sequera and world No. 12, Patty Schnyder. But then she lost to much-improved world No. 49, Alizé Cornet. As a result, she achieved a net gain of just 25 ranking points to 663, and only one ranking place.

=== 2009: First Grand Slam doubles final ===
Vesnina participated in the Auckland Open in January. It was here that she advanced to her first final on the 2009 WTA Tour, upsetting the tournament's sixth-seed Nicole Vaidišová in the second round and the second seed Caroline Wozniacki in the quarterfinals along the way. She then prevailed in a semifinal against British No. 1, Anne Keothavong, with a score of to set up a meeting with fellow-Russian and tournament top seed Elena Dementieva. She lost to Dementieva.

Vesnina participated in the Australian Open but lost in the first round to Julie Coin. At Dubai, where she was a qualifier, Vesnina made it to the quarterfinals defeating Chinese player Li Na in the first round and achieving her first win over a top-10 player by defeating seventh-seeded Svetlana Kuznetsova. In the third round, she defeated 12th-seeded Dominika Cibulková, who retired after Vesnina was leading. In the quarterfinals, she lost to 16th-seeded Kaia Kanepi.

At her next tournament, the Indian Wells Open, Vesnina defeated Sabine Lisicki in the first round and 32nd-seeded Sorana Cîrstea in the second round. In the third round, she lost to eighth seed Victoria Azarenka. Vesnina started her 2009 clay-court season in Ponte Vedra Beach, Florida. She upset sixth-seeded Peng Shuai in the first round, and the third-seed Dominika Cibulková in the quarterfinals. She lost to second-seeded Caroline Wozniacki in the semifinals. She then reached the quarterfinals of the Tier I Family Circle Cup before losing to Sabine Lisicki.

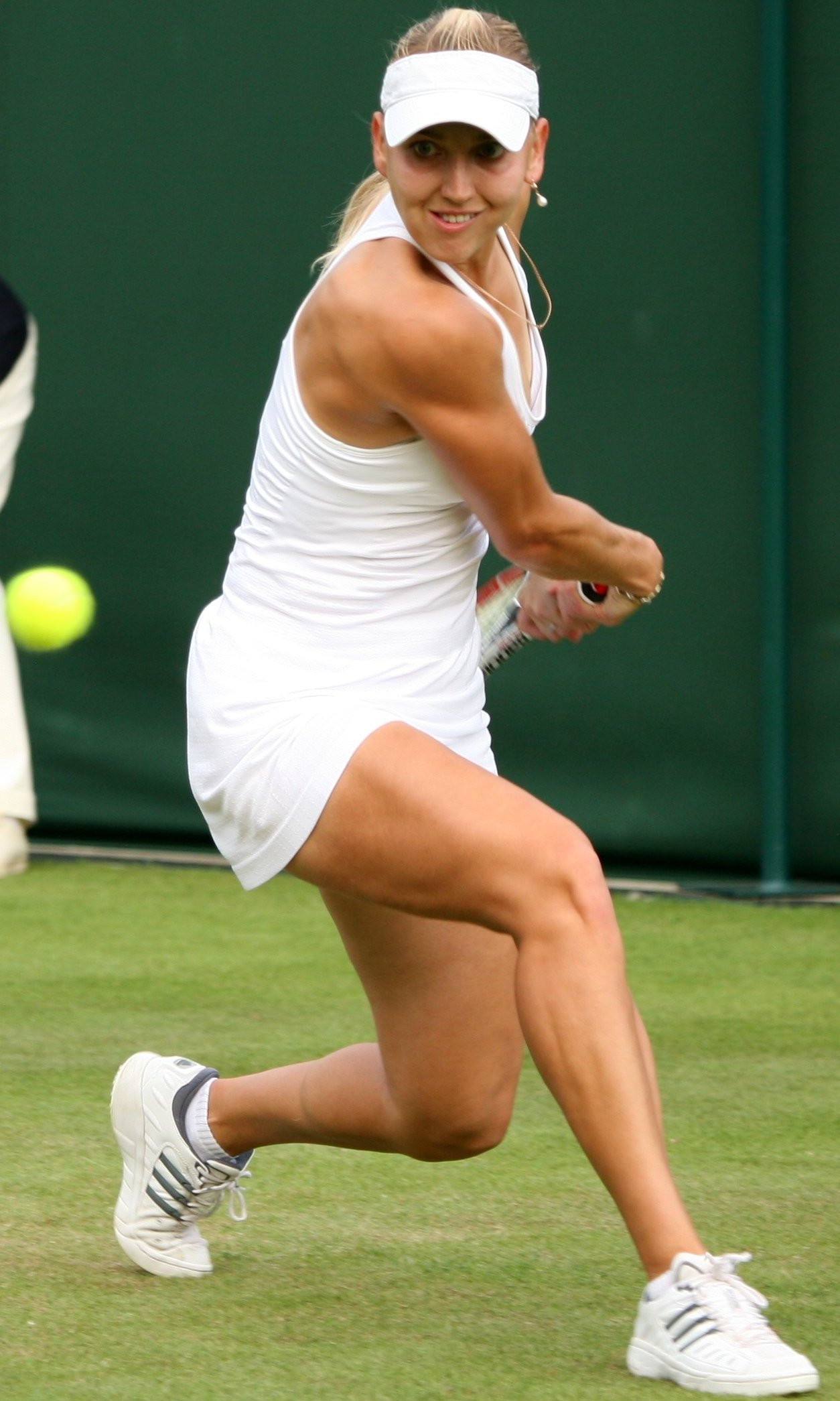
Vesnina at the 2009 Wimbledon Championships

At her next tournament at Rome, she reached the second round by defeating Jill Craybas but lost to Zheng Jie. She then reached the third round of the Madrid Open and lost to Jelena Janković. She lost to Ágnes Szávay in the second round of the French Open, the first time she'd reached the second round there. She did, however, reach her first Grand Slam final in doubles at the French Open, partnering Victoria Azarenka. The pair were seeded 12th but lost in the final to the third seeds and defending champions, Ruano Pascual and Medina Garrigues.

At the Wimbledon Championships, Vesnina defeated Yanina Wickmayer in the first round and Vera Dushevina in the second. She then upset No. 14, Dominika Cibulková, in the third round. Vesnina then fell to No. 4, Elena Dementieva, in the fourth round.

At her first event of the US Open Series, in the LA Championships, Vesnina fell to Zheng Jie in the second round, it was followed by first-round loses in the Rogers Cup to Anna Chakvetadze and in the Western & Southern Open to Zheng Jie. At the Pilot Pen Tennis, she upset two top-20 players – a fast-rising Samantha Stosur in the second round, and Amélie Mauresmo in the semifinals. She, however, lost to Caroline Wozniacki in her second WTA final and her first in a Premier-event.

Vesnina was seeded 31st at the US Open and it was the first time that she had been seeded at a Grand Slam event. She faced Lucie Hradecká in the first round where she came through. In the second round she defeated Jill Craybas to advance to third round at the US Open for the first time. There she faced fellow Russian and her former doubles partner Vera Zvonareva where she fell.

Vesnina next played at the Pan Pacific Open where she was unseeded in singles. She beat María José Martínez Sánchez in the first round and Roberta Vinci in the second but she had to retire in her third-round match against the seventh seed Jelena Janković due to a left thigh strain while trailing. She then played at the China Open but she lost in the first round to Melinda Czink. Vesnina then played at the Kremlin Cup where she was seeded sixth. She suffered a first-round defeat by compatriot Evgeniya Rodina.

Vesnina finished the year with a 34–21 singles record and ranked world No. 24.

=== 2010 ===
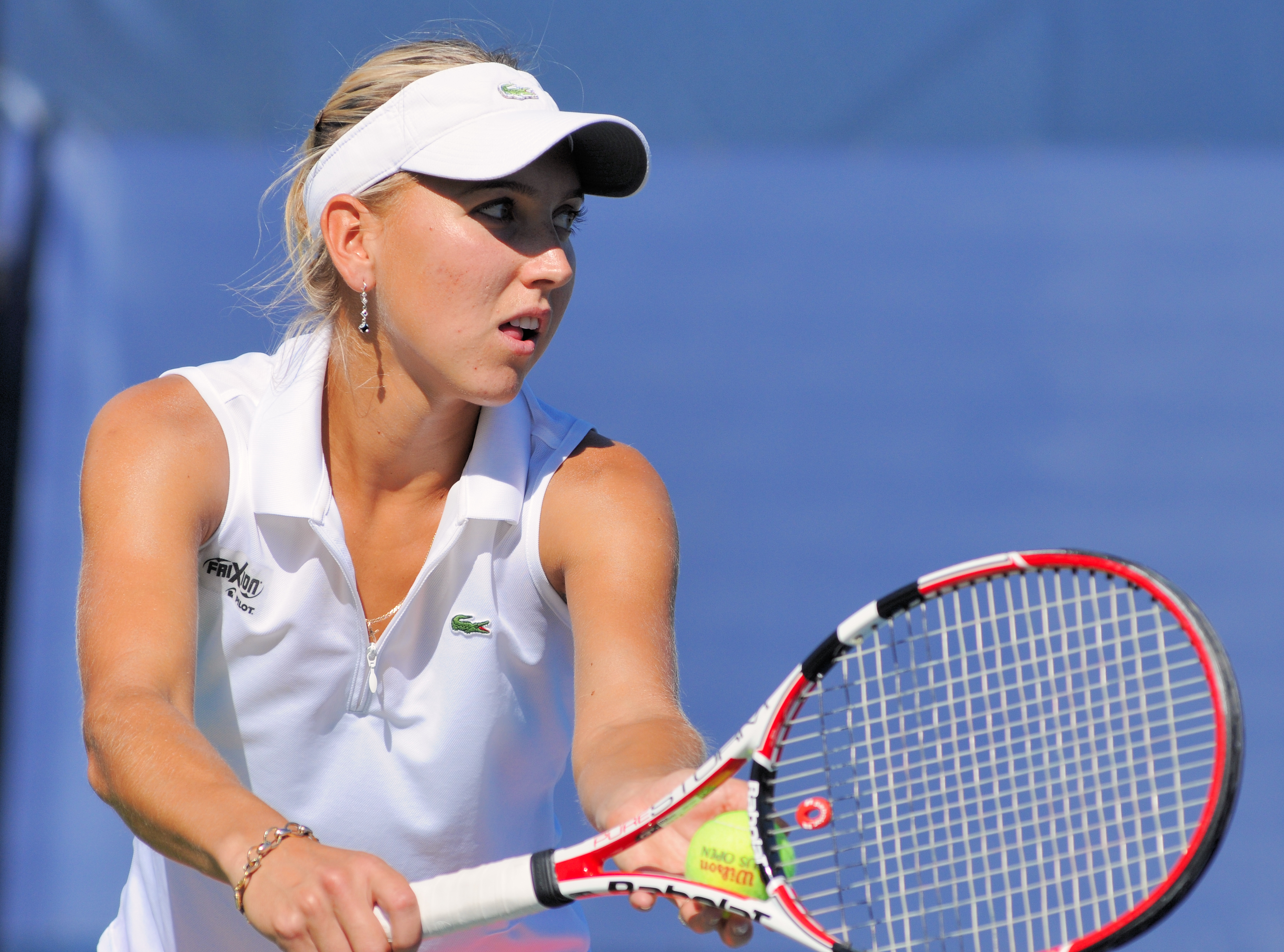
Elena Vesnina at the 2010 US Open

Her first tournament of the year was the Auckland Open where she was seeded No. 6. After beating Alberta Brianti in the first, she was defeated in the second round by Alizé Cornet. She made the quarterfinals in doubles, partnering Riza Zalameda, but lost to Vladimíra Uhlířová and Renata Voráčová. At the Sydney International, she faced No. 7 Vera Zvonareva in the first round, but at 3–3 Zvonareva retired due to a right ankle injury. In the second round, she was defeated by Vera Dushevina.

Seeded No. 28 at the Australian Open, Vesnina was defeated in the first round by Tathiana Garbin. In the doubles, she partnered with Zheng Jie, seeded No. 9, they beat Alizé Cornet and Sharon Fichman in the first round in two sets and in the second, they won in a walkover. In the third round, they lost to the eighth-seeds Bethanie Mattek-Sands and Yan Zi. Vesnina also entered mixed doubles with Andy Ram as the No. 8 seeds. In the first round, they defeated Alicia Molik and Matthew Ebden, and in the second Anna-Lena Grönefeld and Christopher Kas but then fell to the top-seeded Cara Black and Leander Paes in the quarterfinals. Her next tournament was the Paris indoor event where she was knocked out in the second round again by Tathiana Garbin.

At the Dubai Championships, Vesnina fell in three sets to world No. 14, Vera Zvonareva, in the first round. At the Amelia Island Championships, she made it to the semifinals losing to world No. 2, Caroline Wozniacki. She then lost seven consecutive matches, falling in the third round of Charleston Open and the first rounds of Italian Open, Madrid Open, Internationaux de Strasbourg, French Open, Rosmalen Open, and Wimbledon.

At Wimbledon, Vesnina made it to her second Grand Slam final in doubles while partnering Vera Zvonareva. The pair scored wins over the top-seeded Williams sisters in the quarterfinals (which ended the Americans 27 match-winning streak in Grand Slam doubles matches) and over fourth-seeds Gisela Dulko and Flavia Pennetta in the semifinals. In the final, they fell to fellow unseeded pairing Yaroslava Shvedova and Vania King.

Vesnina was able to break her seven-match losing-streak at the İstanbul Cup defeating Bojana Jovanovski, Stefanie Vögele and Anastasia Rodionova. She then upset sixth seed Andrea Petkovic to reach the finals. In the final where she faced fellow Russian Anastasia Pavlyuchenkova, Vesnina went down.

Vesnina then played in the Cincinnati Open, where in the second round she defeated French Open champion Francesca Schiavone. She lost to Ana Ivanovic in the third round. She then needed to qualify in the Connecticut Open, which she did but lost to Maria Kirilenko in the first round. She also fell to fifth seed Sam Stosur in the first round of the US Open.

Vesnina next participated in the Tashkent Open where she beat Lesia Tsurenko and Olga Savchuk to reach the quarterfinals and beat Darya Kustova. In the semifinals, she defeated Monica Niculescu. She lost to Alla Kudryavtseva in the final. Vesnina scored the biggest win of her career two weeks later at the China Open by defeating 12th seed Maria Sharapova. However, she lost to Timea Bacsinszky in the next round.

=== 2011 ===
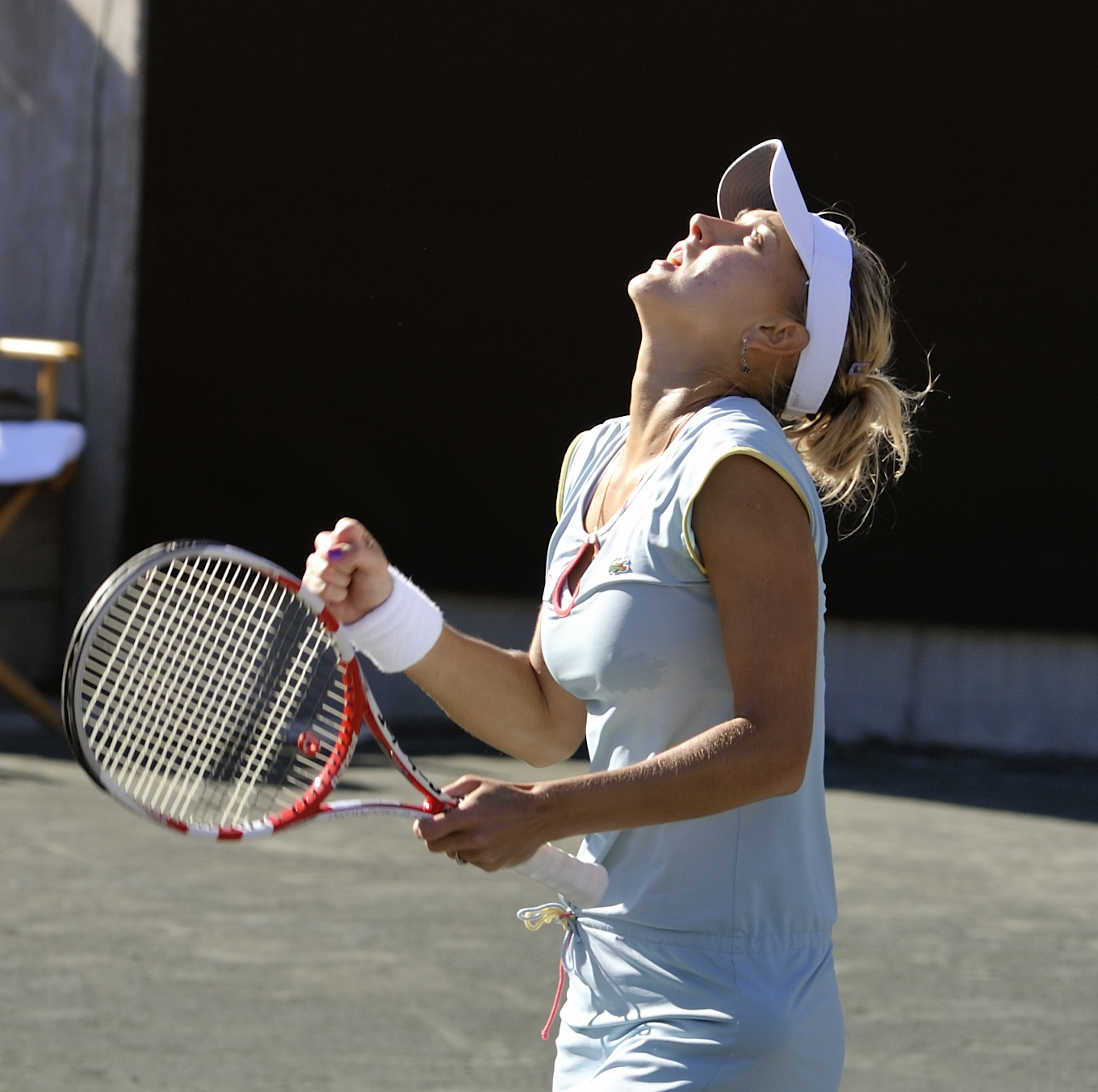
Vesnina at the 2011 Family Circle Cup

Vesnina was seeded seventh at the Auckland Open where she beat Marina Erakovic in her first match of the year. In the next round against Simona Halep, she retired due to dizziness. At the Hobart International, she defeated Arantxa Parra Santonja in the first round but lost to top seed Marion Bartoli.

In the first round of the Australian Open, Vesnina lost to Virginie Razzano. She then also fell in the first rounds of Open GdF Suez, Dubai Championships, and Indian Wells Open and the qualifying round in Qatar Open. At the Miami Open, she defeated higher-ranked players Gisela Dulko and 23rd seed Yanina Wickmayer, but lost to Anabel Medina Garrigues in the third round. At the Family Circle Cup, Vesnina defeated Rebecca Marino in the first round and then knocked out four consecutive seeds No. 14 seed Bethanie Mattek-Sands, second seed and defending champion Sam Stosur, 12th seed Julia Görges and 11th seed Peng Shuai. Vesnina became runner-up at the Family Circle Cup by losing to Caroline Wozniacki in straight sets.

In doubles, Vesnina along with Sania Mirza won the final at Indian Wells by defeating Mattek-Sands and Shaughnessy. The pair won their second title of the year at the Family Circle Cup by defeating Mattek-Sands and Shaughnessy again. They reached the final of Roland Garros, before falling to Andrea Hlaváčková and Lucie Hradecká.

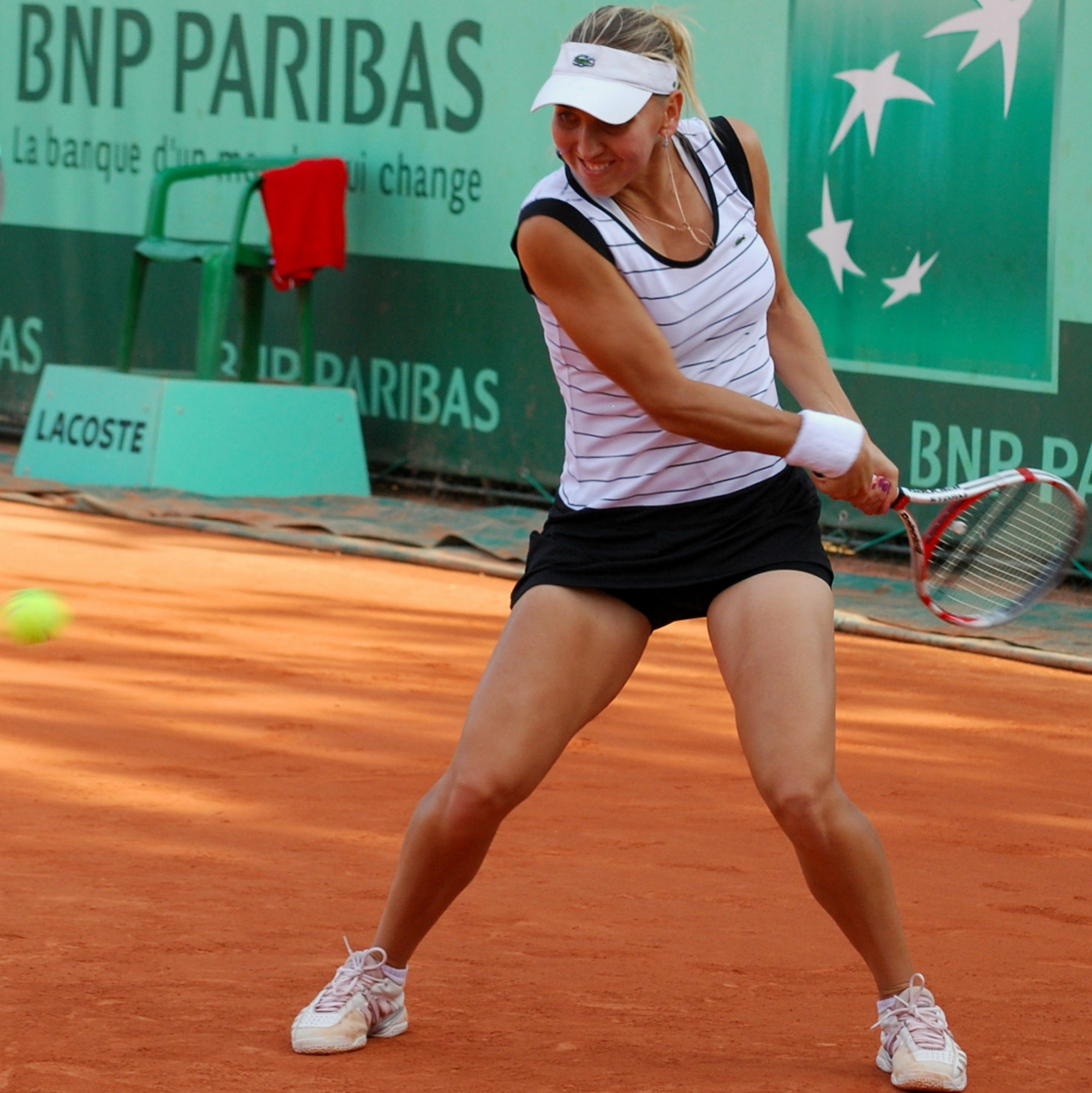
Vesnina swinging a backhand

The pair also reached the semifinals of Wimbledon, before falling to eventual champions and second seeds, Květa Peschke and Katarina Srebotnik.

=== 2012: Partnership with Makarova ===
Together with Leander Paes, Vesnina reached the Australian Open and the Wimbledon mixed-doubles final.

At the Family Circle Cup, Vesnina won her first-round match. In the second round, she lost to Serena Williams and was unable to defend her runner-up points from the previous year. She reached the doubles finals of the Dubai Open and Indian Wells with Sania Mirza. At the Australian Open, the pair reached the semifinals.

Vesnina paired with Ekaterina Makarova in Madrid and Rome, and reached the finals in both tournaments. The pair were defeated in the quarterfinals of the French Open. At Wimbledon and the London Olympics, she continued pairing with Makarova in doubles, and the pair were defeated in the quarterfinals in both tournaments. At the US Open, they were defeated in the third round. In Beijing, the pair were victorious in the final against Mirza and Llagostera Vives.

=== 2013: Two singles titles, Grand Slam doubles champion ===
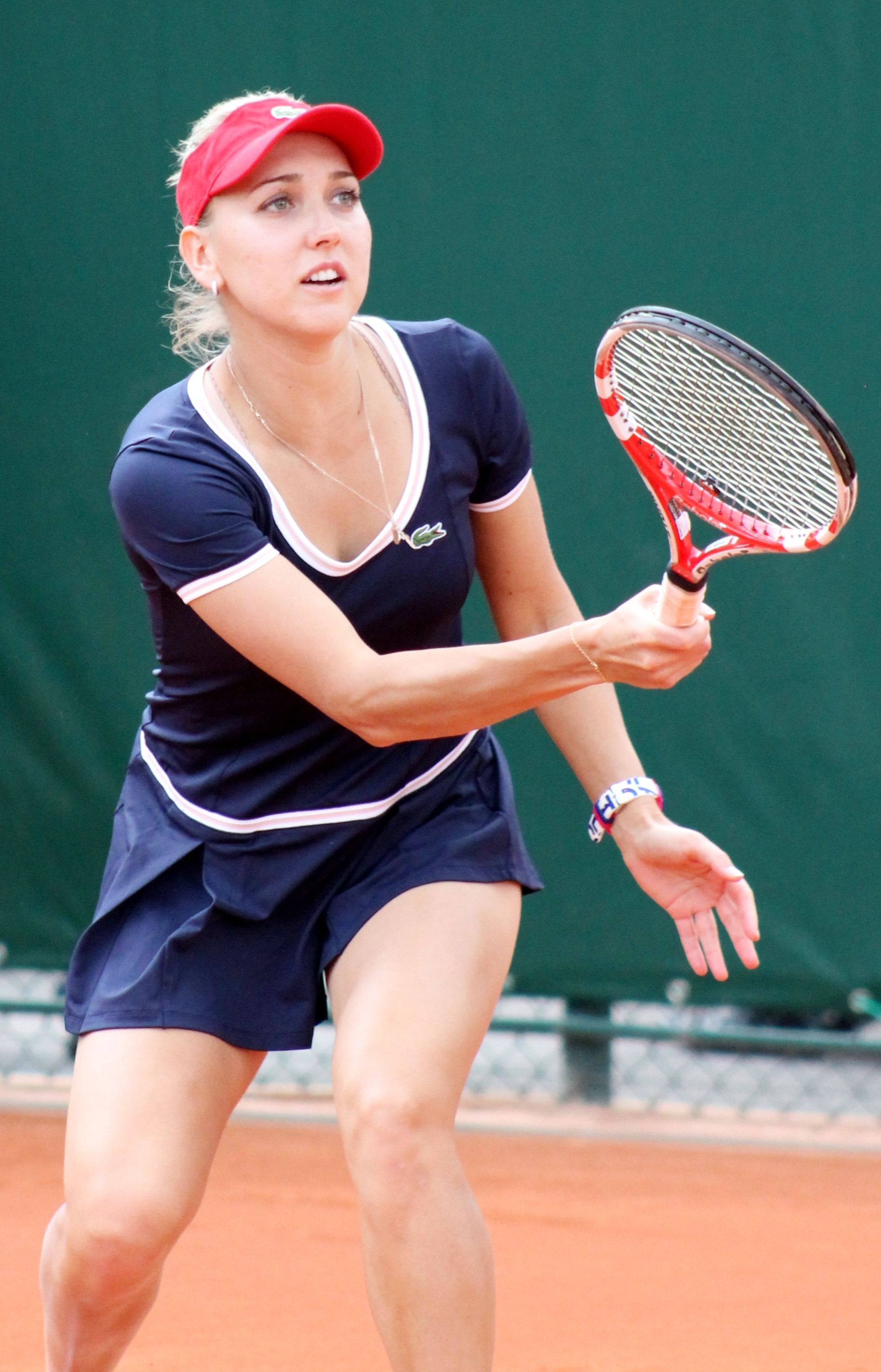
Vesnina at the 2013 French Open

At the start of 2013, Vesnina claimed her first WTA Tour title by beating defending champion Mona Barthel in the final of the Hobart International. At the Australian Open, she reached the fourth round, saving a match point against 16th seed Roberta Vinci in the third round en route. She was eventually defeated by the defending champion Victoria Azarenka. She and Makarova then reached the doubles semifinal, losing to world No. 1 pairing Errani/Vinci.

Vesnina won her second Premier Mandatory doubles title with Makarova at the Indian Wells Open, beating third seeds Petrova/Srebotnik in the final. Vesnina won her first Grand Slam title at the French Open, capturing the doubles title alongside Makarova, beating Errani/Vinci in the final, after beating No. 2 seeds Hlaváčková/Hradecká.

Vesnina won her second WTA title at the Eastbourne International. En route to the final, she defeated Ana Ivanovic in the first round and Heather Watson in the second. She then went on to beat second seed Li Na in the quarterfinals and Yanina Wickmayer in the semifinals. In the final, she beat Jamie Hampton to win her first grass-tour event.

Vesnina and Makarova qualified for the WTA Championships, after finishing in the top 8 of the rankings for teams. They beat Errani/Vinci for the second time in a row in the semifinals, but lost to Wimbledon champions Hsieh Su-wei/Peng Shuai.

Finishing 25th at the end of the season, Vesnina qualified for the Tournament of Champions held in Sofia, Bulgaria. Vesnina finished third in the group, behind Samantha Stosur and Ana Ivanovic, failing to progress to the semifinals.

Vesnina finished 2013 with a 31–21 record, winning two titles and finishing at No. 25. For doubles, she had a 33–12 record and also won two titles. She finished fifth in the rankings.

=== 2014: Second major doubles title ===
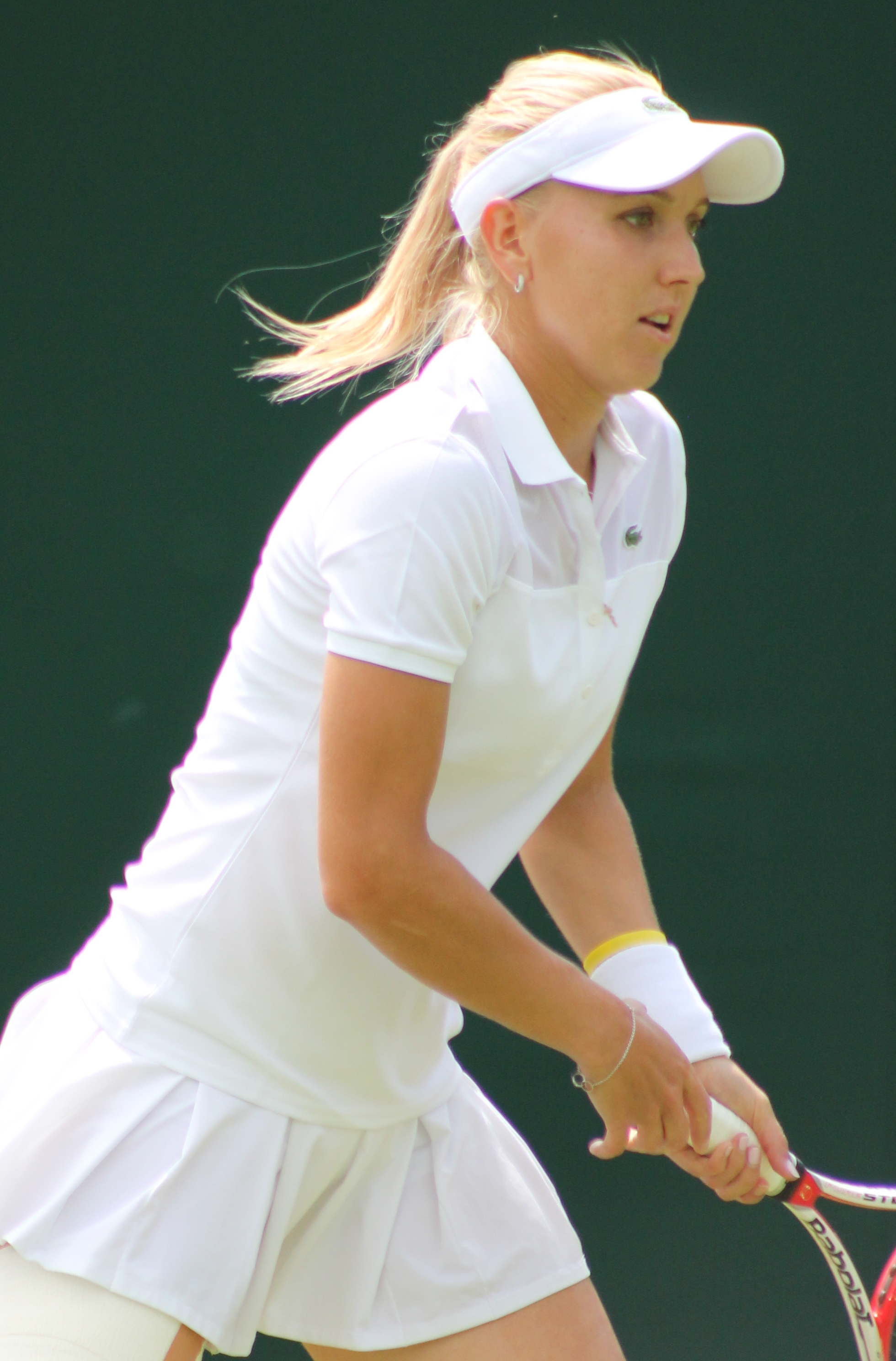
Vesnina at the 2014 Wimbledon Championships

Vesnina failed to defend her title at the Hobart International, losing to qualifier Estrella Cabeza Candela in the second round. Also, at the Australian Open, Vesnina failed to defend fourth-round points, losing to Alison Riske in the first round. However, she reached the final of the doubles competition with Makarova, losing to Errani/Vinci 5–7 in the final set.

Vesnina/Makarova then suffered a shock loss at the hands of Noppawan Lertcheewakarn/Vera Zvonareva in the Pattaya Open. They then suffered two quarterfinal losses in Dubai and Indian Wells, losing to Kudryavtseva/Rodionova and Black/Mirza. They reached the final of the Miami Open, losing to Martina Hingis/Sabine Lisicki. Vesnina/Makarova failed to defend their title at the French Open, losing to French wildcards Julie Coin/Pauline Parmentier in the second round. Vesnina reached her first semifinal of the year at the Portugal Open, beating Roberta Vinci in the process. As the defending champion at the Eastbourne International, she fell in the second round to eventual champion Madison Keys.

As a lucky loser in the Rogers Cup, Vesnina lost in the second round to doubles partner Makarova in straight sets. Vesnina and Makarova won their second major title at the US Open, not playing any seeded teams throughout the whole competition. At the WTA Finals, Vesnina/Makarova lost in the quarterfinal to Kudryavtseva/Rodionova.

Vesnina finished the season with an 18–20 record in singles, with a ranking of 65. For doubles, Vesnina had a record of 24–14 and won one title, the US Open. She was No. 7 in doubles in the year-end rankings.

=== 2015 ===
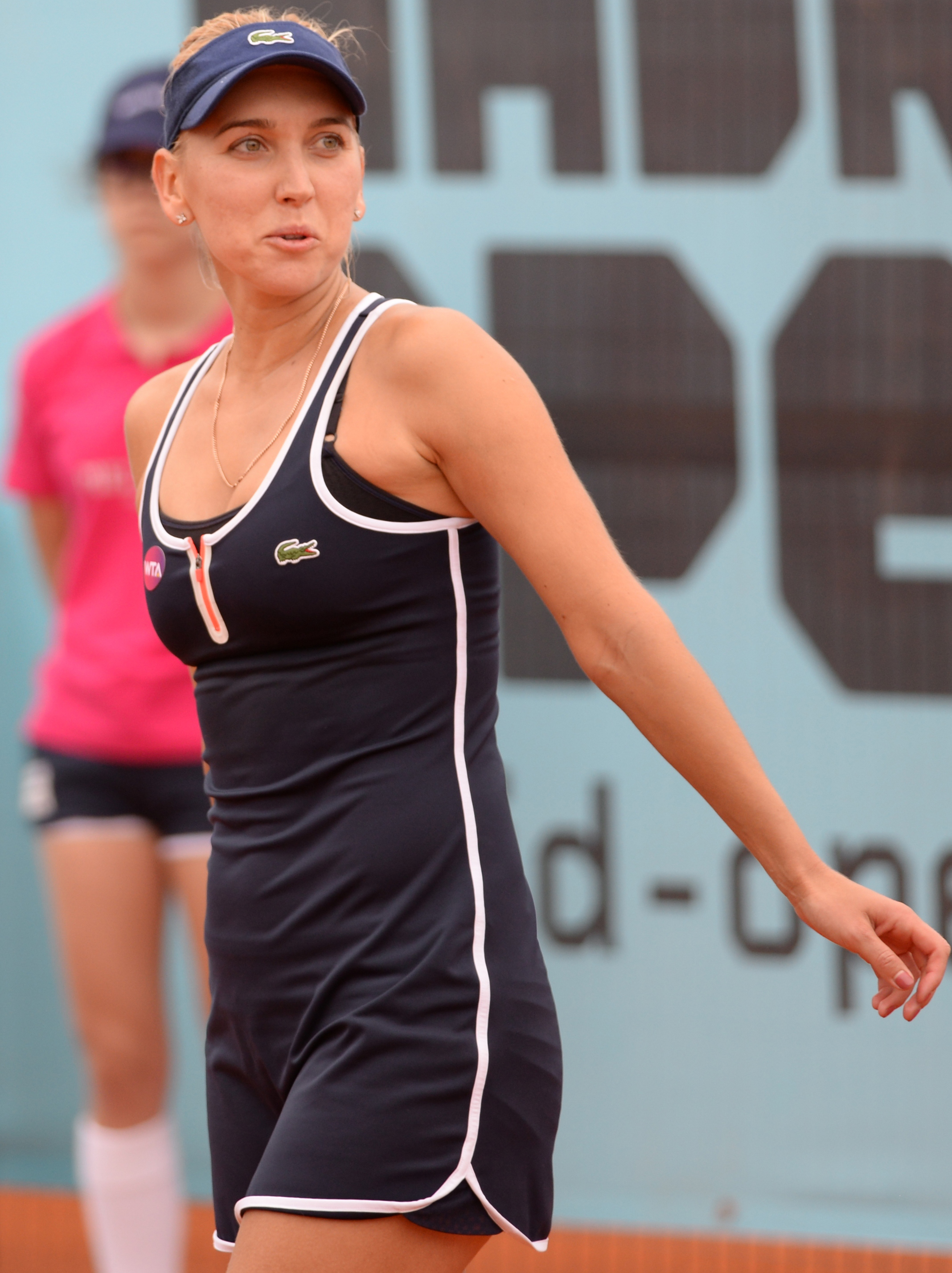
Vesnina at the 2015 Madrid Open

Vesnina and Makarova reached the Wimbledon final where they lost to Hingis/Mirza.

=== 2016: Wimbledon SF; Olympic and WTA Finals doubles champion ===
Vesnina started the year by playing at the Brisbane International as the seventh seed for qualifying, and she qualified for the main draw by beating Australian wildcard Tammi Patterson, Mathilde Johansson and Ysaline Bonaventure. In the first round, Vesnina lost to former world No. 1 and eventual champion, Victoria Azarenka, in two sets. In doubles, she and Anastasia Pavlyuchenkova were the third seeds, and they reached the quarterfinals where they lost to Medina Garrigues and Parra Santonja.

Vesnina failed to reach the main draw of the Australian Open, losing in the first round of qualifying. It marked the time in decade she had failed to qualify for the main draw in a Grand Slam event, her singles ranking dropping to No. 122 in the world. In doubles she and Anastasia Pavlyuchenkova were seeded fifth and reached the quarterfinals where they lost to Alla Kudryavtseva and Vania King. In mixed doubles, Vesnina and partner Bruno Soares were also seeded fifth. They reached the final where they defeated CoCo Vandeweghe and Horia Tecău, which marked her first mixed-doubles Grand Slam title.

At the inaugural St. Petersburg Ladies' Trophy, Vesnina received a wildcard for the singles draw and lost in the second round to qualifier Kateryna Kozlova. She reached the doubles quarterfinals with Daria Kasatkina, but they lost to world No. 1 pairing Hingis/Mirza.

Vesnina then participated in the Qatar Open, where she qualified for the main draw after beating Ons Jabeur and Naomi Broady. She faced Caroline Garcia in the first round, and caused an upset by winning. Vesnina then achieved her first top-2 win of her career against Simona Halep in three sets. She then caused her third straight upset against former world No. 1, Caroline Wozniacki, once again in three sets. However, her run ended in the quarterfinals after being defeated by eventual champion Carla Suárez Navarro in two sets. Nevertheless, this was her best showing at a Premier-5 tournament. In the doubles competition, Vesnina and partner Kasatkina ended world No. 1 pairing Hingis/Mirza's 41 match winning streak in the quarterfinals. However, despite winning the first set 6–3 against world No. 2 pairing Chan Hao-ching/Chan Yung-jan, they lost in three sets.

At the Indian Wells Open, Vesnina fell in the first round of the qualifying to American wildcard Julia Boserup. In doubles, Vesnina once again partnered Daria Kasatkina but lost in the second round, to eventual finalists Julia Görges/Karolína Plíšková. In the Miami Open, Vesnina managed to get past qualifying after beating Kateryna Kozlova, avenging her loss in St. Petersburg, and Tsvetana Pironkova. She was drawn to face fellow qualifier Jana Čepelová in the first round and won in straight sets. In the second round, Vesnina caused a huge upset when she beat former world No. 1 and seven-time Grand Slam champion, Venus Williams, in three sets. Vesnina then faced Britain Johanna Konta but lost. In doubles, Vesnina and Kasatkina fell to two-time Grand Slam champion Bethanie Mattek-Sands/Lucie Šafářová in the second round.

At the Charleston Open, the 85th-ranked Vesnina became the first qualifier to ever reach the championship match in the tournament's 44-year history, where she faced a determined Sloane Stephens. Stephens ended up prevailing 7–6, 6–2 as the fatigue of 718 minutes – nearly 12 hours – of tournament tennis appeared to take a toll on Vesnina in the second set.

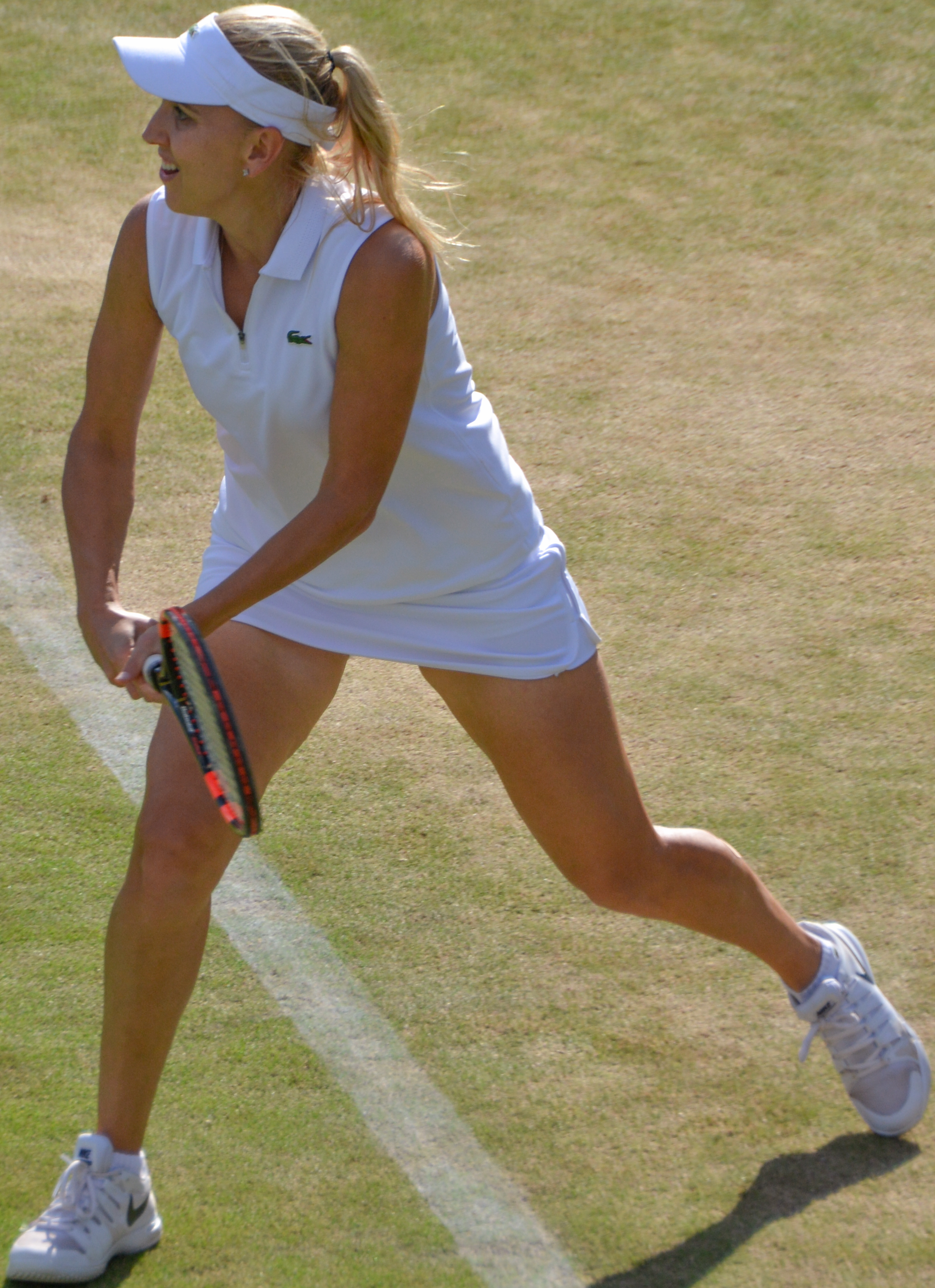
Vesnina at the 2016 Wimbledon Championships

Vesnina again subdued the qualification, now in Madrid. In the second round she fell to Kvitová. In doubles, she and Makarova played their first tournament together since late 2015 and reached the semifinals. In Rome, Vesnina could not qualify for the main draw. However, with Makarova she reached the final, losing to Hingis/Mirza.

At Wimbledon, Vesnina competed in her first Grand Slam semifinal with victories over Tamira Paszek, Andrea Petkovic, and Julia Boserup in the first three rounds before outlasting doubles partner Makarova in three sets to advance to her first Grand Slam quarterfinal. She then defeated Dominika Cibulková to continue her resurgence into the semifinals, where she was handily defeated by world No. 1 and eventual champion, Serena Williams, in 48 minutes, the quickest Wimbledon semifinal in the history of the championships.

Vesnina and Makarova finally won their first tournament title of 2016 at the Rogers Cup and then won the gold medals at the Summer Olympics for Russia. In singles, Vesnina lost to tenth seed Madison Keys in the Rogers Cup and to Elina Svitolina in Connecticut. Seeded 19th in the US Open, Vesnina defeated Anett Kontaveit and Annika Beck before losing to 11th seed Suárez Navarro in the third round. In doubles, Vesnina and Makarova were seeded fifth. They saved match points against Samantha Stosur/Zhang Shuai in the second round, and defeated 10th seed Vania King/Monica Niculescu and 13th seed Andreja Klepač/Katarina Srebotnik to reach the semifinals where they lost to 12th seeds Mattek-Sands/Šafářová.

Vesnina and Makarova qualified for their third joint WTA Finals, defeating Hlaváčková/Hradecká, Hingis/Mirza and Mattek-Sands/Šafářová en route to win their first Championships title.

=== 2017: Indian Wells singles and Wimbledon doubles titles, career-high singles ranking ===
Vesnina began season at the Brisbane International. In singles, she was seeded seventh but lost her first match to Alizé Cornet. Alongside Makarova, seeded second, the pair reached the doubles final, but lost to top seeds Mattek-Sands and Mirza. Another opening match loss in singles came in Sydney, losing to CoCo Vandeweghe.

Vesnina then headed to the Australian Open, where she was seeded 14th in singles and third in the doubles, again, alongside Makarova. Vesnina would reach the third round in the singles and the quarterfinals in the doubles. Her singles form began to pick up, with a quarterfinal run in St. Petersburg and last-16 appearances at the Qatar Open and the Dubai Championships. Vesnina and Makarova won their first title of the year in Dubai.

The next appearance for Vesnina would be at Indian Wells. Seeded 14th, Vesnina defeated Shelby Rogers and Tímea Babos to set-up a fourth round meeting with Angelique Kerber. Vesnina beat the US Open champion, before defeating Australian Open runner-up Venus Williams and Kristina Mladenovic to reach her first Premier Mandatory final. In an all-Russian final against Svetlana Kuznetsova, Vesnina came from a set down to win her third WTA singles title. With this victory, Vesnina climbed to a career-high ranking of 13. She then traveled to Florida for the Miami Open and lost in the second round to Ajla Tomljanović.

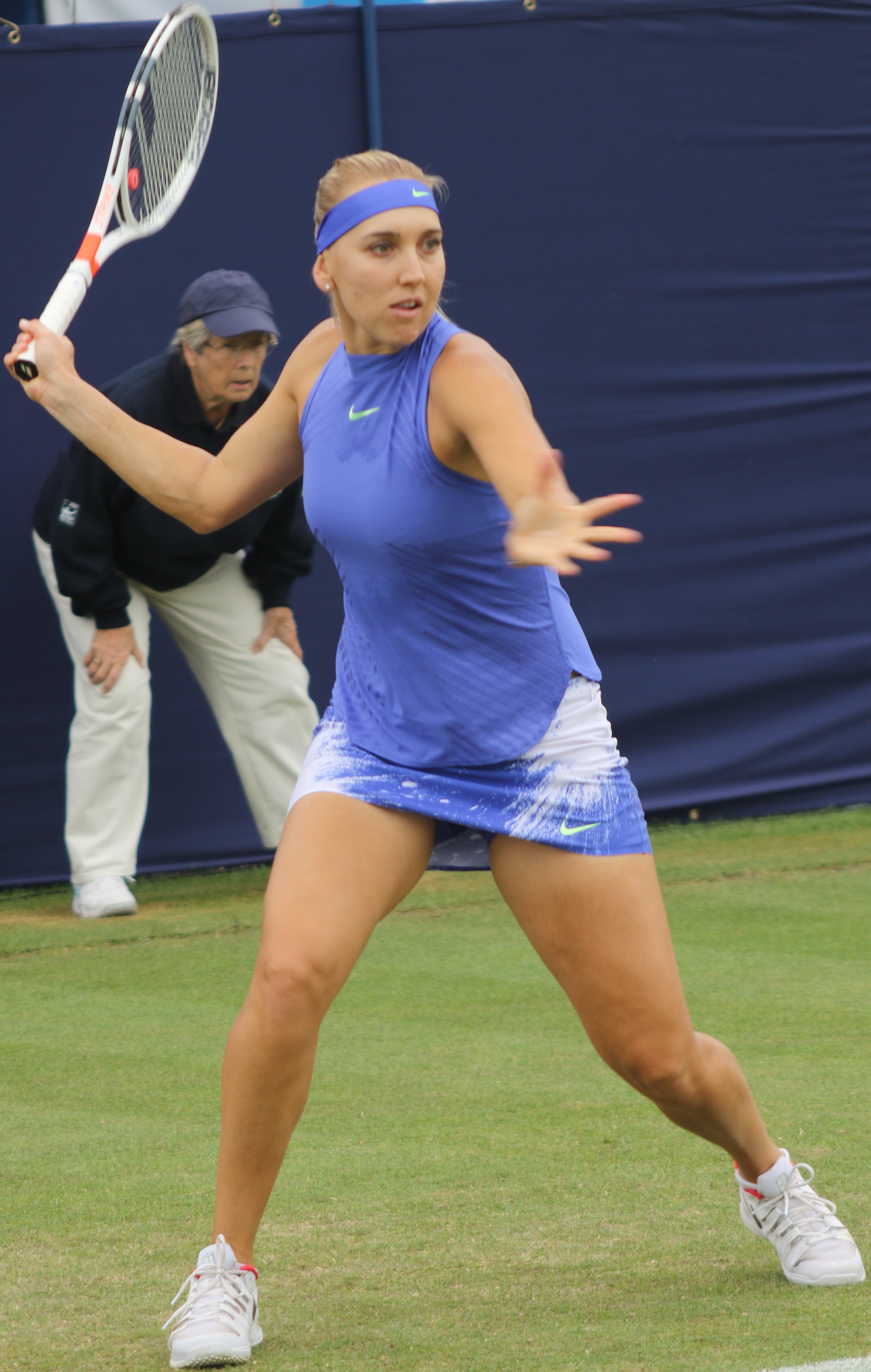
Vesnina at the 2017 Eastbourne International

Vesnina started clay-court season with a stunning loss at the Charleston Open to the 282nd ranked player in the world, Fanny Stollár. She received a bye in the first round and lost in straight sets. She lost in the second round to Daria Kasatkina at the Grand Prix. Her clay-court season continued to spiral as she lost in the first round of the Madrid Open, Italian Open, and at Strasbourg. However, her and Makarova did make it to the finals in the doubles of the Italian Open. They lost to Latisha Chan and Martina Hingis. After a string of losses in the first round, Vesnina reached the third round of the French Open. She lost to Carla Suárez Navarro in the third round. Vesnina and Makarova lost in the quarterfinals during the doubles competition.

Beginning the grass-court season at Eastbourne, she received a bye in the first round and beat Verónica Cepede Royg in the second. However, she lost to the eventual finalist Caroline Wozniacki in the third round. Entering Wimbledon, Vesnina was seeded 15th. She won a first-round match against the Russian Anna Blinkova. She was then defeated by Victoria Azarenka in the second round. Vesnina's good fortune in her doubles partnership with Makarova carried on to the summer, where the team beat Chan Hao-ching and Monica Niculescu in the Wimbledon doubles final. This was the first "double bagel" in the women's doubles tournament final since 1953.

Vesnina traveled to Toronto for the Rogers Cup where she was defeated by Ashleigh Barty in the second round. However, Vesnina and Makarova won second Premier Mandatory doubles title of the year. They beat Anna-Lena Grönefeld and Květa Peschke in the final. Vesnina beat Caroline Garcia in the first round of the Cincinnati Open before falling to Caroline Wozniacki in the second round. Before the US Open, Vesnina competed at the Connecticut Open, but lost in the first round to Ana Bogdan. Vesnina Opened her US Open with a win in the first round over Anna Blinkova. She followed this with a second round win over Kirsten Flipkens. Vesnina took it to Madison Keys in the third round, winning the first set, but lost the next two sets. Seeded first in the doubles competition, Vesnina and Makarova were the favorites to win. However, they lost in the third round to the 14th seeds Andreja Klepač and María José Martínez Sánchez.

Vesnina returned at the Wuhan Open where she lost in the third round to qualifier Maria Sakkari. She made another third-round appearance at the China Open where she lost to Elina Svitolina. Vesnina and Makarova lost in the semifinals to Tímea Babos and Andrea Sestini Hlaváčková. Vesnina had early-round exits at both the Hong Kong Open and Kremlin Cup. Due to her success in doubles with Makarova, Elena qualified for the doubles tournament at the WTA Finals. They easily defeated Gabriela Dabrowski and Xu Yifan. However, they were stunned by Kiki Bertens and Johanna Larsson in the next round. Vesnina ended her season at the WTA Elite Trophy. She lost both of her matches in the round-robins stage, ending her season. She ended the year 18th in singles and third in doubles. Her doubles ranking at the end of the year was a career high.

=== 2018: World No. 1 in doubles ===
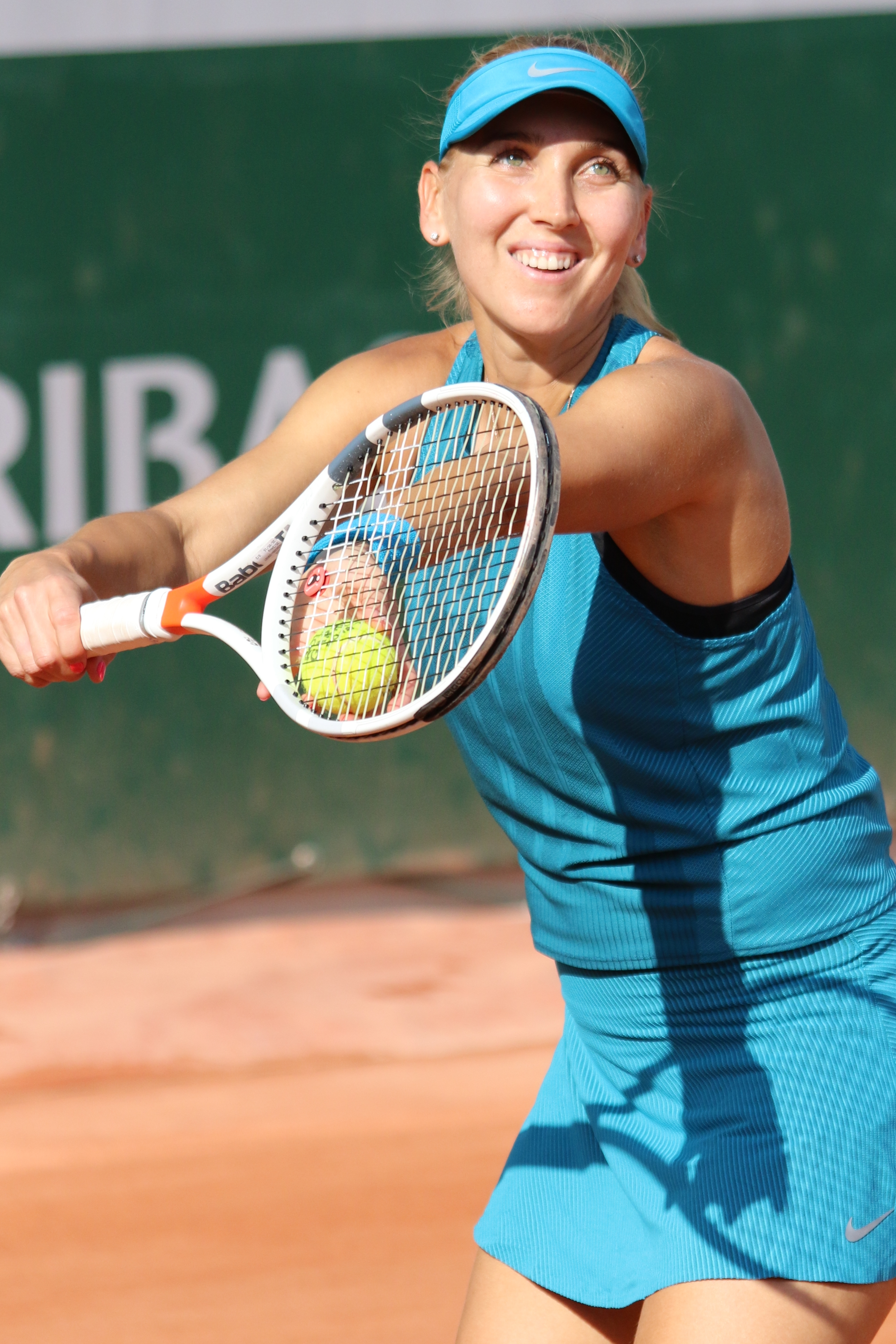
Vesnina at the 2018 French Open

Vesnina began the season with a win in the first round at the Sydney International over Lara Arruabarrena. She fell in the second round to Dominika Cibulková. She went into the Australian Open as the 16th seed and beat Ons Jabeur in the first round but lost to Naomi Osaka in the second. In October, Vesnina announced that she was pregnant.

=== 2021: Comeback, Olympic silver medal and Wimbledon doubles final ===
Having taken maternity leave since November 2018, Vesnina announced a return to professional tennis on 31 December 2020, in advance of the 2021 season. She won the first match of her return at the Qatar Open, partnering Laura Siegemund. In singles, on her comeback trail, she reached the third round of the French Open in which she lost to the 21st seed and eventual quarterfinalist, Elena Rybakina. At the same event, she reached the final of mixed doubles, partnering Aslan Karatsev, in which they were defeated by Joe Salisbury and Desirae Krawczyk.

At Wimbledon, Vesnina won her first round singles match against Martina Trevisan, before losing to the 20th seed Coco Gauff. At the same tournament in doubles, partnering Veronika Kudermetova, the unseeded pair ousted top seeds and reigning Roland Garros champions Barbora Krejčíková/Katerina Siniaková and Caroline Dolehide/Storm Sanders in the semifinals, en route to the final. They lost to third seeds, Hsieh Su-wei and Elise Mertens, in three sets match, despite having two match points. She returned to the top 100 in doubles at No. 55 – up 84 places from 139. In singles, her second-round showing saw her climb another 66 spots, from 370 to 304.

At the delayed Tokyo Olympics, Vesnina again partnered Kudermetova. The pair lost in their semifinal to eventual gold medalists Krejčíková and Siniaková of the Czech Republic. In the bronze medal match, Vesnina and Kudermetova were defeated by Brazilians Laura Pigossi and Luisa Stefani, after having four consecutive match points at 9–5 in the third set super-tiebreak. In mixed doubles, partnering Karatsev, Vesnina earned a silver medal, losing in the final to compatriots Andrey Rublev and Anastasia Pavlyuchenkova, failing to convert a match point at 10–9 in the third set super-tiebreak.

=== 2022–2024: Another hiatus, second comeback and retirement ===
Having not played in either 2022 or 2023, during which time she gave birth to her second child, Vesnina announced she intended to return to competitive action in 2024 on 28 December 2023. She made her comeback in April at the 2024 Madrid Open, going on to play several tournaments with limited success and making her final appearance at the Paris Olympics, where she and Ekaterina Alexandrova lost in the first round to Karolína Muchová and Linda Nosková.

Vesnina announced her retirement from professional tennis on 21 November 2024.

== Career statistics ==
=== Performance timelines ===
Key
W	F	SF	QF	#R	RR	Q#	P#	DNQ	A	Z#	PO	G	S	B	NMS	NTI	P	NH

(W) winner; (F) finalist; (SF) semifinalist; (QF) quarterfinalist; (#R) rounds 4, 3, 2, 1; (RR) round-robin stage; (Q#) qualification round; (P#) preliminary round; (DNQ) did not qualify; (A) absent; (Z#) Davis/Fed Cup Zonal Group (with number indication) or (PO) play-off; (G) gold, (S) silver or (B) bronze Olympic/Paralympic medal; (NMS) not a Masters tournament; (NTI) not a Tier I tournament; (P) postponed; (NH) not held; (SR) strike rate (events won / competed); (W–L) win–loss record.
To avoid confusion and double counting, these charts are updated at the conclusion of a tournament or when the player's participation has ended.

==== Singles ====
Current through the 2021 Wimbledon Championships.

Tournament	2005	2006	2007	2008	2009	2010	2011	2012	2013	2014	2015	2016	2017	2018	...	2021	SR	W–L	Win%
Australian Open	A	4R	2R	3R	1R	1R	1R	1R	4R	1R	1R	Q1	3R	2R		A	0 / 12	12–12	50%
French Open	A	1R	1R	1R	2R	1R	1R	1R	1R	2R	3R	2R	3R	1R		3R	0 / 14	8–14	36%
Wimbledon	A	2R	3R	2R	4R	1R	2R	2R	2R	2R	1R	SF	2R	A		2R	0 / 13	18–13	58%
US Open	Q2	1R	1R	2R	3R	1R	1R	2R	2R	3R	2R	3R	3R	A		A	0 / 12	12–12	50%
Win–loss	0–0	4–4	3–4	4–4	6–4	0–4	1–4	2–4	5–4	4–4	3–4	8–3	7–4	1–2		2–2	0 / 51	50–51	50%

==== Doubles ====
Tournament	2005	2006	2007	2008	2009	2010	2011	2012	2013	2014	2015	2016	2017	2018	2019	2020	2021	SR	W–L	Win%
Grand Slam tournaments
Australian Open	A	1R	1R	2R	3R	3R	2R	SF	SF	F	QF	3R	QF	F	A	A	A	0 / 13	31–13	70%
French Open	A	QF	1R	2R	F	3R	F	QF	W	2R	SF	F	QF	1R	A	A	1R	1 / 14	38–13	75%
Wimbledon	A	1R	3R	2R	3R	F	SF	QF	3R	3R	F	QF	W	A	A	NH	F	1 / 13	38–11	78%
US Open	A	3R	1R	2R	QF	QF	3R	3R	QF	W	2R	SF	3R	A	A	A	A	1 / 12	29–10	74%
Win–loss	0–0	5–4	2–4	4–4	11–3	11–4	12–4	12–4	15–3	13–3	13–3	14–4	14–3	5–2	0–0	0–0	5–2	3 / 52	136–47	74%
Olympic Games
Summer Olympics	Not Held			QF	Not Held			QF	Not Held			G	Not Held				4th	1 / 4	12–4	75%
Year-end championships
WTA Finals	Did not qualify								F	QF	A	W	SF	A	DNQ	NH	DNQ	1 / 4	5–3	63%
Career statistics
Titles	1	0	1	1	0	0	3	2	2	1	1	3	3	1	0	0	0	Career total: 19		
Finals	1	2	3	3	1	1	4	6	3	3	4	5	5	3	0	0	1	Career total: 44		
Year-end ranking	126	46	45	18	22	23	10	9	5	7	8	6	3	16	–	–	45			

== Grand Slam tournament finals ==
=== Doubles: 11 (3 titles, 8 runner-ups) ===
Result	Year	Championship	Surface	Partner	Opponents	Score
Loss	2009	French Open	Clay	(Belarus) Victoria Azarenka	(Spain) Anabel Medina Garrigues (Spain) Virginia Ruano Pascual	1–6, 1–6
Loss	2010	Wimbledon	Grass	(Russia) Vera Zvonareva	(United States) Vania King (Kazakhstan) Yaroslava Shvedova	6–7^{(6–8)}, 2–6
Loss	2011	French Open	Clay	(India) Sania Mirza	(Czech Republic) Andrea Hlaváčková (Czech Republic) Lucie Hradecká	4–6, 3–6
Win	2013	French Open	Clay	(Russia) Ekaterina Makarova	(Italy) Sara Errani (Italy) Roberta Vinci	7–5, 6–2
Loss	2014	Australian Open	Hard	(Russia) Ekaterina Makarova	(Italy) Sara Errani (Italy) Roberta Vinci	4–6, 6–3, 5–7
Win	2014	US Open	Hard	(Russia) Ekaterina Makarova	(Switzerland) Martina Hingis (Italy) Flavia Pennetta	2–6, 6–3, 6–2
Loss	2015	Wimbledon	Grass	(Russia) Ekaterina Makarova	(Switzerland) Martina Hingis (India) Sania Mirza	7–5, 6–7^{(4–7)}, 5–7
Loss	2016	French Open	Clay	(Russia) Ekaterina Makarova	(France) Caroline Garcia (France) Kristina Mladenovic	3–6, 6–2, 4–6
Win	2017	Wimbledon	Grass	(Russia) Ekaterina Makarova	(Chinese Taipei) Chan Hao-ching (Romania) Monica Niculescu	6–0, 6–0
Loss	2018	Australian Open	Hard	(Russia) Ekaterina Makarova	(Hungary) Tímea Babos (France) Kristina Mladenovic	4–6, 3–6
Loss	2021	Wimbledon	Grass	(Russia) Veronika Kudermetova	(Chinese Taipei) Hsieh Su-wei (Belgium) Elise Mertens	6–3, 5–7, 7–9

=== Mixed doubles: 5 (1 title, 4 runner-ups) ===
Result	Year	Championship	Surface	Partner	Opponents	Score
Loss	2011	Wimbledon	Grass	(India) Mahesh Bhupathi	(Austria) Jürgen Melzer (Czech Republic) Iveta Benešová	3–6, 2–6
Loss	2012	Australian Open	Hard	(India) Leander Paes	(Romania) Horia Tecău (United States) Bethanie Mattek-Sands	3–6, 7–5, [3–10]
Loss	2012	Wimbledon	Grass	(India) Leander Paes	(United States) Mike Bryan (United States) Lisa Raymond	3–6, 7–5, 4–6
Win	2016	Australian Open	Hard	(Brazil) Bruno Soares	(United States) CoCo Vandeweghe (Romania) Horia Tecău	6–4, 4–6, [10–5]
Loss	2021	French Open	Clay	(Russia) Aslan Karatsev	(United States) Desirae Krawczyk (United Kingdom) Joe Salisbury	6–2, 4–6, [5–10]

== Other significant finals ==
=== Year-end championships ===
==== Doubles: 2 (1 title, 1 runner-up) ====
Result	Year	Championship	Surface	Partner	Opponents	Score
Loss	2013	WTA Championships, Istanbul	Hard (i)	(Russia) Ekaterina Makarova	(Chinese Taipei) Hsieh Su-wei (China) Peng Shuai	4–6, 5–7
Win	2016	WTA Finals, Singapore	Hard (i)	(Russia) Ekaterina Makarova	(United States) Bethanie Mattek-Sands (Czech Republic) Lucie Šafářová	7–6^{(7–5)}, 6–3

=== Olympic Games ===
==== Doubles: 2 (1 gold medal) ====
Result	Year	Tournament	Surface	Partner	Opponents	Score
Gold	2016	Rio Olympics	Hard	(Russia) Ekaterina Makarova	(Switzerland) Timea Bacsinszky (Switzerland) Martina Hingis	6–4, 6–4
4th place	2020	Tokyo Olympics	Hard	(Russia) Veronika Kudermetova	(Brazil) Laura Pigossi (Brazil) Luisa Stefani	6–4, 4–6, [9–11]

==== Mixed doubles: 1 (silver medal) ====
Result	Year	Tournament	Surface	Partner	Opponents	Score
Silver	2020	Tokyo Olympics	Hard	(Russia) Aslan Karatsev	(Russia) Anastasia Pavlyuchenkova (Russia) Andrey Rublev	3–6, 7–6^{(7–5)}, [11–13]

== Awards ==
2008

- Merited Master of Sports of Russia

2013

- The Russian Cup in the nomination Pair of the Year (with Ekaterina Makarova)
- WTA Fan Favorite Doubles Team of the Year

2014

- The Russian Cup in the nomination Pair of the Year (with Makarova)

2016

- The Russian Cup in the nomination Pair of the Year (with Makarova)
- Honorary Citizen of Sochi

== Notes ==
Awards
Preceded by (United States) Serena Williams & (United States) Venus Williams	WTA Fan Favorite Doubles Team of the Year (with (Russia) Ekaterina Makarova); 2013	Succeeded by (Italy) Sara Errani & (Italy) Roberta Vinci
