= 2022 WTA Finals =

- Date: October 31 – November 7
- Edition: 51st (singles) / 46th (doubles)
- Draw: 8S / 8D
- Prize money: $5,000,000
- Surface: Hard (indoor)
- Location: Fort Worth, United States
- Venue: Dickies Arena

Champions

Singles
- (France) Caroline Garcia

Doubles
- Veronika Kudermetova / (Belgium) Elise Mertens
← 2021 ·	WTA Finals	· 2023 →

The 2022 WTA Finals was the professional women's year-end championship tennis tournament run by the Women's Tennis Association (WTA) from October 31 to November 7, 2022. It was the 51st edition of the singles event and the 46th edition of the doubles competition. The tournament was held on an indoor hardcourt at the Dickies Arena in Fort Worth, Texas, marking the return of the tournament to the United States after 17 years, and was contested by the eight highest-ranked singles players and doubles teams of the 2022 WTA Tour.

== Champions ==
=== Singles ===
- (France) Caroline Garcia def. Aryna Sabalenka 7–6^{(7–4)}, 6–4

This is Garcia's fourth title of the year and eleventh of her career.

=== Doubles ===
- Veronika Kudermetova / (Belgium) Elise Mertens def. (Czech Republic) Barbora Krejčíková / (Czech Republic) Kateřina Siniaková 6–2, 4–6, [11–9]

== Tournament ==
The 2022 WTA Finals is the 51st edition of the singles event and the 46th of the doubles competition. It is currently being contested by the season's top eight singles players and top eight doubles teams.

The tournament was originally scheduled to take place at the Shenzhen Bay Sports Center in Shenzhen, China as a part of the WTA Tour's ten-year deal with Shenzhen, beginning in 2019. However, on December 2, 2021, WTA chairman Steve Simon announced that all tournaments scheduled to be held in both China and Hong Kong would be suspended beginning in 2022, due to concerns regarding the security and well-being of tennis player Peng Shuai after her allegations of sexual assault against Zhang Gaoli, a high-ranking member of the Chinese Communist Party, and the travel restrictions owing to the COVID-19 pandemic in mainland China.

On September 6, 2022, the WTA announced that the event would take place at the Dickies Arena in Fort Worth, Texas, United States from October 31 to November 7, 2022, and return to China the following year.

=== Qualifying ===
In the singles, point totals are calculated by combining point totals from sixteen tournaments (excluding ITF and WTA 125 tournaments). Of these sixteen tournaments, a player's results from the four Grand Slam events, the four WTA 1000 tournaments with 1,000 points for the winner, and (for the players who played the main draw of least 2 such tournaments) the best results from two WTA 1000 tournaments with 900 points for the winner must be included.

In the doubles, point totals are calculated by any combination of eleven tournaments throughout the year. Unlike in the singles, this combination does not need to include results from the Grand Slams or WTA 1000 tournaments.

=== Format ===
Both the singles and doubles event features eight players/teams in a round-robin event, split into two groups of four.

Over the first four days of competition, each player/team meets the other three players/teams in her group, with the top two in each group advancing to the semifinals. The first-placed player/team in one group meets the second-placed player/team in the other group, and vice versa. The winners of each semifinal meet in the championship match.

==== Round robin tie-breaking methods ====
The final standings are made using these methods:

1. Greatest number of match wins.
2. Greatest number of matches played.
3. Head-to-head results if only two players are tied, or if three players are tied then:

a. If three players each have the same number of wins, a player having played less than all three matches is automatically eliminated and the player advancing to the single elimination competition is the winner of the match-up of the two remaining tied players.
b. Highest percentage of sets won.
c. Highest percentage of games won.

== Prize money and points ==
The total prize money for the 2022 WTA Finals is US$5,000,000. The tables below are based on the updated draw sheet information.

Stage	Prize money		Points
Stage	Singles	Doubles (Note: Prize money for doubles is per team.)	Points
Champion	RR (Note: RR means prize money or points won in the round robin round.) + $1,240,000	RR + $230,000	RR + 750
Runner-up	RR + $420,000	RR + $80,000	RR + 330
Semifinalist	RR + $30,000	RR + $5,000	RR
Round robin win per match	+$110,000	+$20,000	250
Round robin loss per match	—	—	125
Participation Fee	$110,000	$50,000	—
Alternates	2 matches = $ 1 match = $ 0 matches = $	2 matches = $ 1 match = $ 0 matches = $	—

- An undefeated champion would earn the maximum 1,500 points, and $1,680,000 in singles or $340,000 in doubles.

== Qualified players ==
=== Singles ===
#	Players	Points	Date qualified
1	(Poland) Iga Świątek	10,335	September 12
2	(Tunisia) Ons Jabeur	4,555	September 12
3	(United States) Jessica Pegula	4,316	October 13
4	(United States) Coco Gauff	3,271	October 19
5	(Greece) Maria Sakkari	3,121	October 21
6	(France) Caroline Garcia	3,000	October 19
7	Aryna Sabalenka	2,970	October 20
8	Daria Kasatkina	2,935	October 20

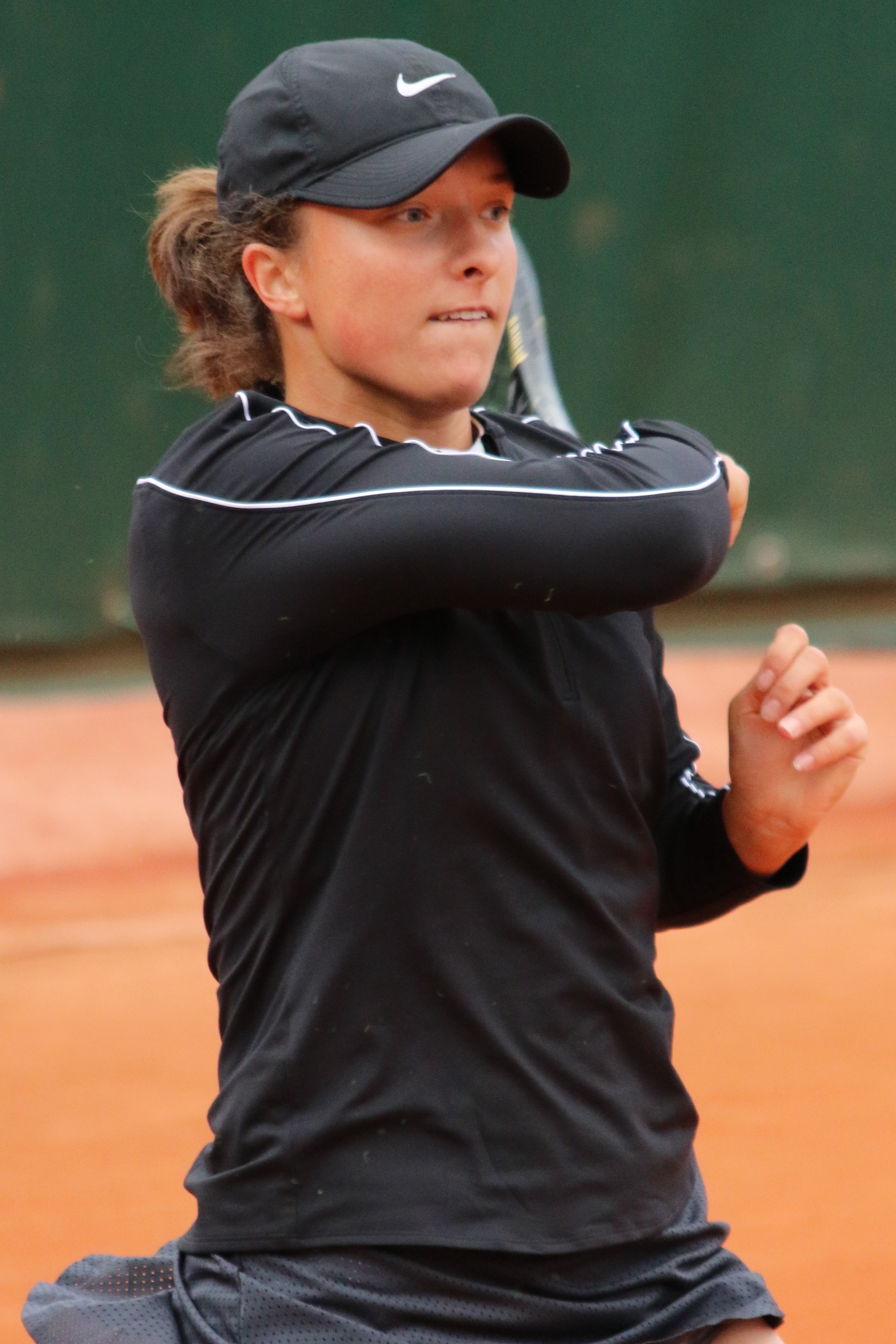
Iga Świątek obtained the world No. 1 ranking, and won eight titles throughout the year, including two Grand Slam titles.

Iga Świątek and Ons Jabeur were announced as the first qualifiers on 12 September.

Iga Świątek began 2022 by reaching the semifinals in Adelaide and the Australian Open, before embarking upon a remarkable run. Ṡwiątek won her first title of the year at Doha, defeating top-ten players Aryna Sabalenka, Maria Sakkari, and Anett Kontaveit in successive matches. She next won Indian Wells and Miami back-to-back, becoming the first woman since Victoria Azarenka in 2016, and just the fourth woman overall, to win the Sunshine Double in singles. Upon the retirement of world No. 1 Ashleigh Barty in March 2022, Świątek gained the world No. 1 ranking for the first time upon winning her second round match at Miami.

This victory was followed by consecutive victories at Stuttgart and Rome, before winning her second Grand Slam title at the French Open. Her run came to an end at Wimbledon, comprising 37 consecutive match wins and six titles. After some lacklustre tournaments throughout the summer, Świątek won her third Grand Slam title at the US Open, defeating Jessica Pegula, Aryna Sabalenka, and Ons Jabeur back-to-back to win the title. Świątek would go on to reach the final in Ostrava, losing to Barbora Krejčíková in three close sets, before winning the title in San Diego. Although Świątek received the requisite points to qualify for the WTA Finals in May 2022, her participation was not confirmed until 12 September 2022.

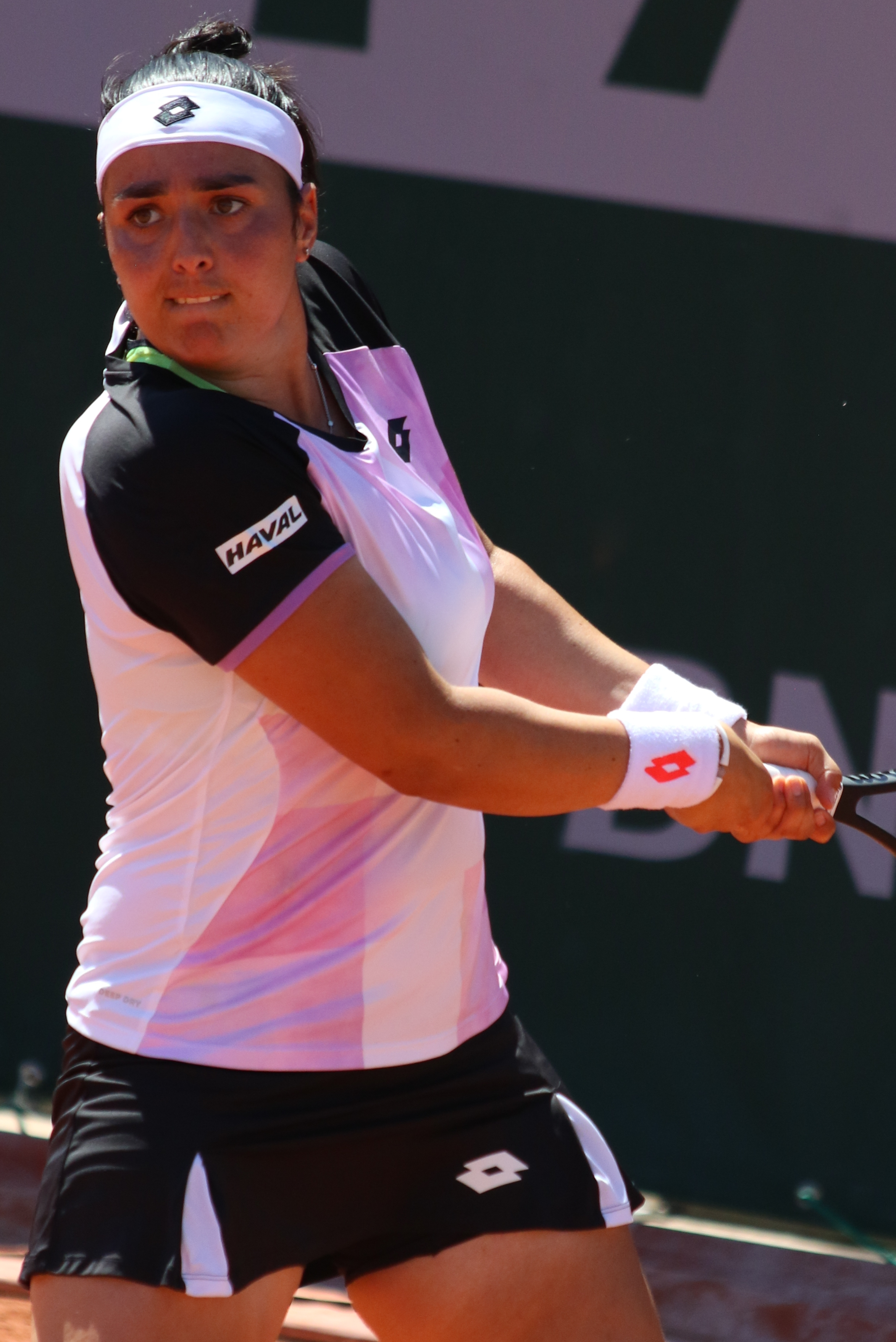
Ons Jabeur became the first Tunisian player to win a WTA 1000 title, and reached two Grand Slam finals in 2022.

Ons Jabeur is the first player from Tunisia, and the first Arab and North African woman, to qualify for the WTA Finals. She began 2022 in Sydney, but retired from her match against Anett Kontaveit after sustaining a back injury, forcing her to withdraw from all events up to Dubai. She would next reach the final in Charleston, losing to Belinda Bencic in the final. After a close-fought loss to Paula Badosa in Stuttgart, Jabeur would become the first Arab and African woman to win a WTA 1000 title, doing so in Madrid. She defeated the likes of Belinda Bencic, Simona Halep, and Jessica Pegula to win her first clay-court title. This was followed by a runner-up finish in Rome, another WTA 1000 event, where she defeated Maria Sakkari and Daria Kasatkina, before losing in the final to Iga Świątek. A successful clay season was finished with a surprise first-round loss at the French Open.

After winning her third title in Berlin, Jabeur became the first African and Arab woman to reach a Grand Slam final, losing to Elena Rybakina at Wimbledon. Jabeur would later reach a second Grand Slam final at the US Open, defeating Veronika Kudermetova and Caroline Garcia before losing once again to Iga Świątek.

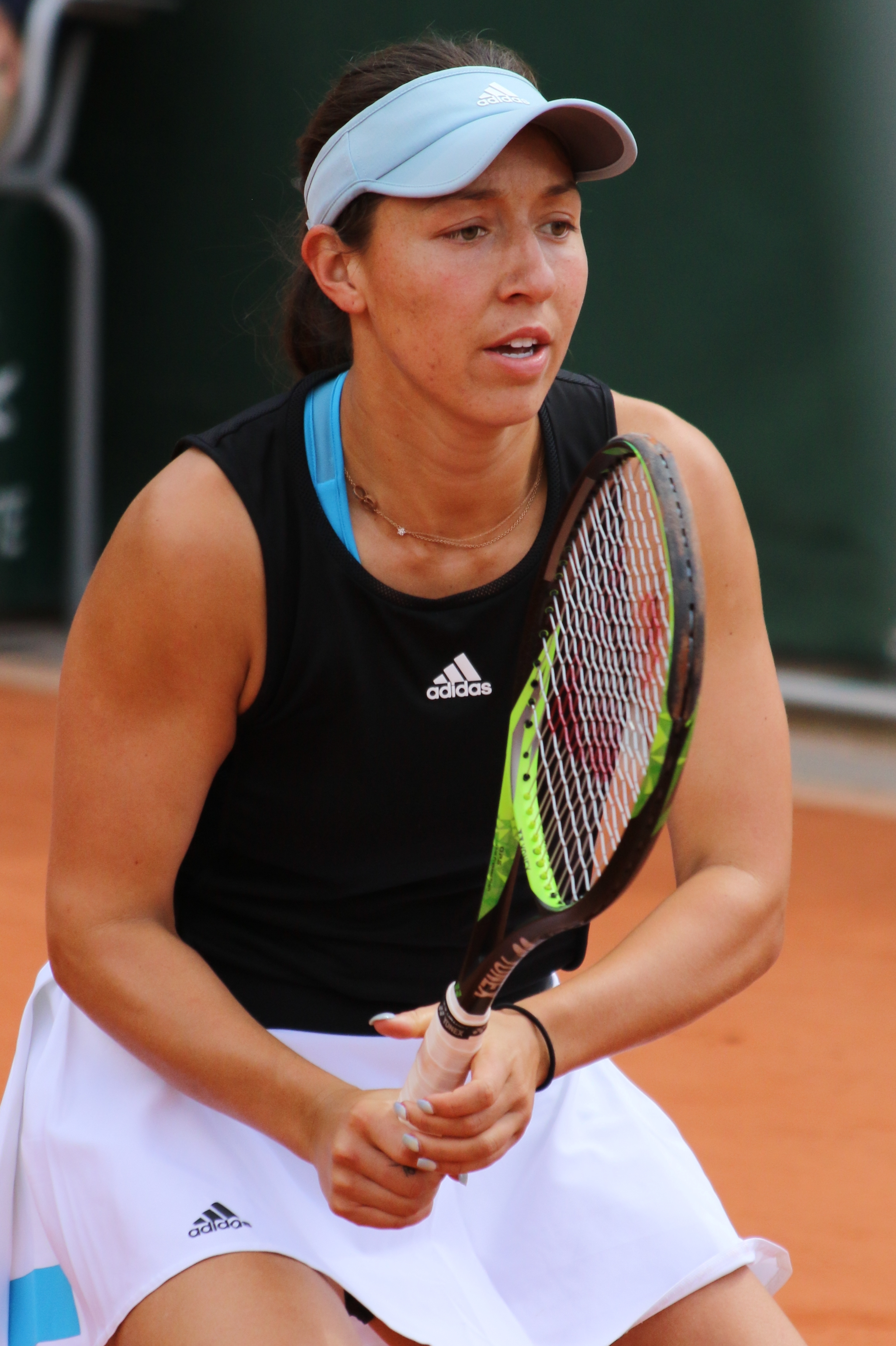
Jessica Pegula would reach three Grand Slam quarterfinals, and win a WTA 1000 title in Guadalajara.

On October 13, Jessica Pegula was announced as the third qualifier.

Jessica Pegula would emerge as one of the most consistent players in the 2022 season. She would reach the quarterfinals of the Australian Open, losing to the eventual champion Ashleigh Barty. She would perform consistently in Dubai and Doha, before reaching the semifinals of Miami, losing to Iga Świątek. She would later lose in the final of Madrid to Ons Jabeur, and to Aryna Sabalenka in Rome. She would reach the quarterfinals of the French Open, losing once again to Iga Świątek; she next participated at Wimbledon, losing in the third round.

She performed consistently in the North American season, losing to three eventual champions: to Simona Halep in the semifinals of Toronto, to Caroline Garcia in Cincinnati, and to Iga Świątek in the quarterfinals of the US Open. She would lose once again to Iga Świątek in the semifinals of San Diego, before winning her second WTA Tour singles title and first WTA 1000 title in Guadalajara, defeating Elena Rybakina, Bianca Andreescu, Sloane Stephens, Victoria Azarenka, and Maria Sakkari consecutively.

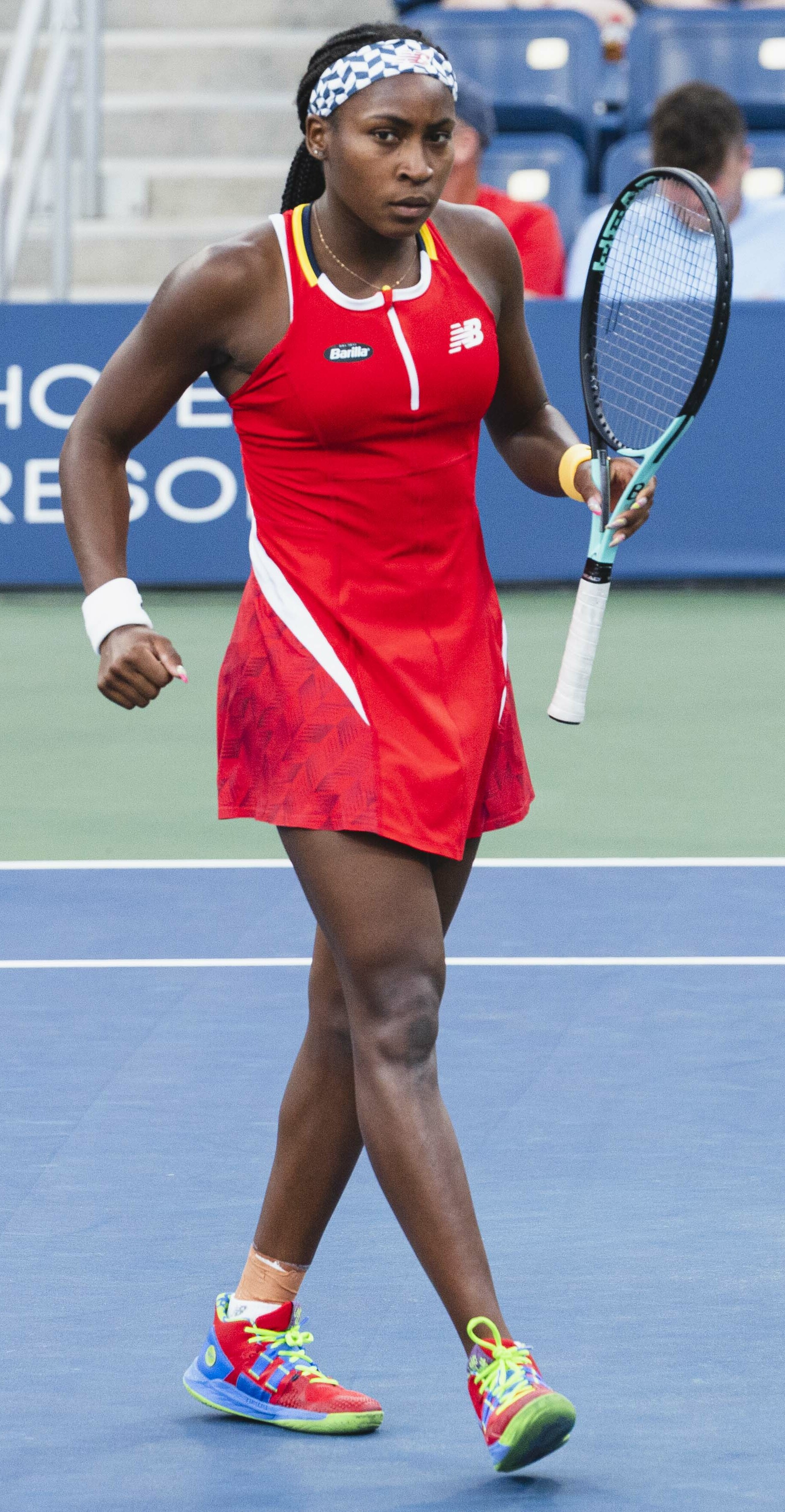
Coco Gauff performed consistently throughout the season, and would reach a Grand Slam final at the French Open.

On October 19, Coco Gauff was announced as the fourth qualifier.

Coco Gauff emerged as the most successful teenager since Maria Sharapova throughout the 2022 season. Gauff reached the semifinals in Adelaide, and would later reach the quarterfinals in Doha, defeating Caroline Garcia and Paula Badosa, but losing to Maria Sakkari. Gauff would also perform well in Indian Wells and Miami, losing to the eventual champion Iga Świątek in the latter tournament. After consistent results throughout the clay season, she would reach her first Grand Slam final French Open, losing once again to Iga Świątek.

She reached the semifinals of Berlin, the quarterfinals of San Jose, and the quarterfinals of Toronto. She would also reach the quarterfinals of the US Open, losing to Caroline Garcia, and would later lose in the quarterfinals of San Diego to Iga Świątek, and in the quarterfinals of Guadalajara to Victoria Azarenka. Despite being one of the year's most consistent players, Gauff failed to win a title in the year.

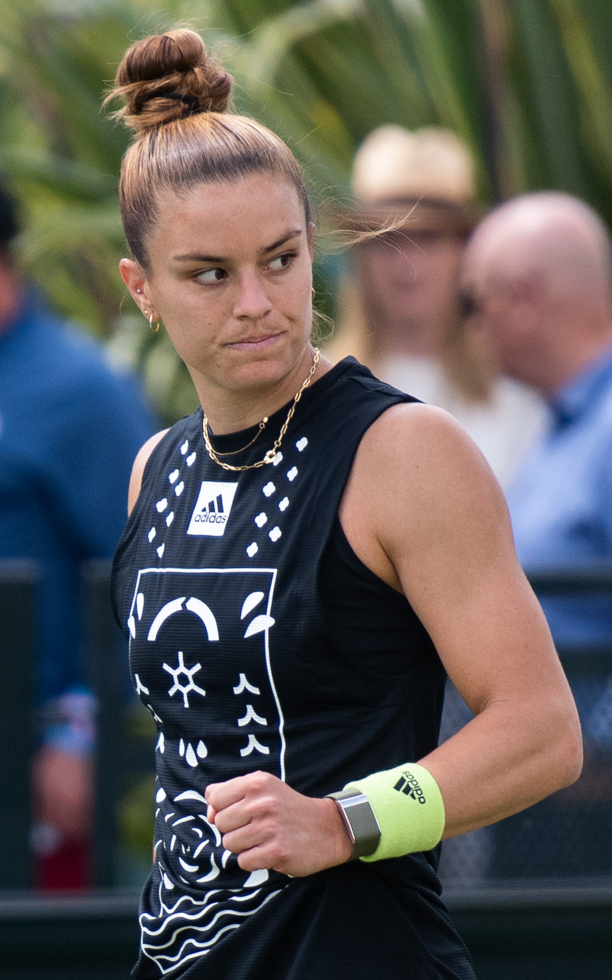
Maria Sakkari played consistently throughout the season, reaching three WTA finals.

On October 21, Maria Sakkari was announced as the final qualifier.

Maria Sakkari had a successful start to the year, reaching the fourth round of the Australian Open. She would reach the finals of St. Petersburg, losing to Anett Kontaveit, and would later reach the semifinals of Doha, and the final of Indian Wells, losing in both instances to Iga Świątek. After a poor clay court season, reaching just one quarterfinal in Rome, Sakkari reached a quarterfinal in Nottingham and a semifinal in Berlin.

After mediocre results throughout the summer, Sakkari would reach the final in Parma, losing to Mayar Sherif, and would reach another WTA 1000 final at Guadalajara, losing to Jessica Pegula. Sakkari would become the last player to qualify for the WTA Finals after defeating Veronika Kudermetova in the Guadalajara quarterfinals, although she did not win a title in 2022.

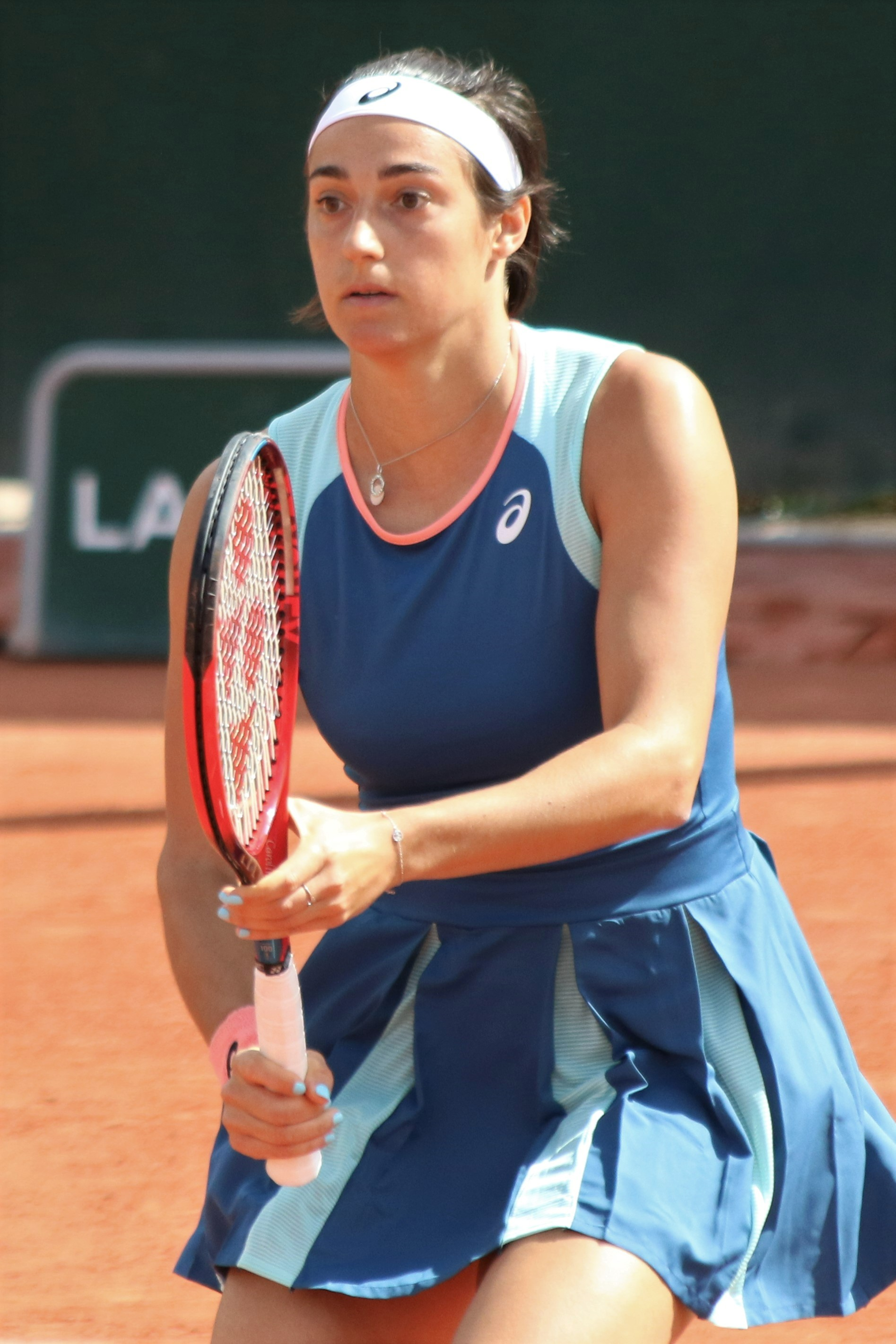
Caroline Garcia won three titles, and reached a Grand Slam semifinal.

On October 19, Caroline Garcia was announced as the fifth qualifier.

Caroline Garcia suffered a mixed start to the year, reaching the quarterfinals of Sydney, but losing in the opening rounds of Melbourne and the Australian Open. She would reach the semifinals of Lyon, losing to Zhang Shuai, but would suffer inconsistent results throughout the North American hard court swing, and did not perform to the best of her ability on the European spring clay court season. She would later win the title at Bad Homburg, defeating Alizé Cornet and Bianca Andreescu en route to the title, and would reach the fourth round of the Wimbledon Championships. A successful summer season was capped off by reaching the semifinals in Lausanne and the quarterfinals in Palermo, before winning the title in Warsaw, defeating the world No. 1 Iga Świątek in the process.

Garcia would later win the title in Cincinnati, defeating Maria Sakkari, Jessica Pegula, Aryna Sabalenka, and Petra Kvitová; she would also reach the semifinals of the US Open. Despite this, she would suffer a mediocre end to the season, winning one match in three tournaments.

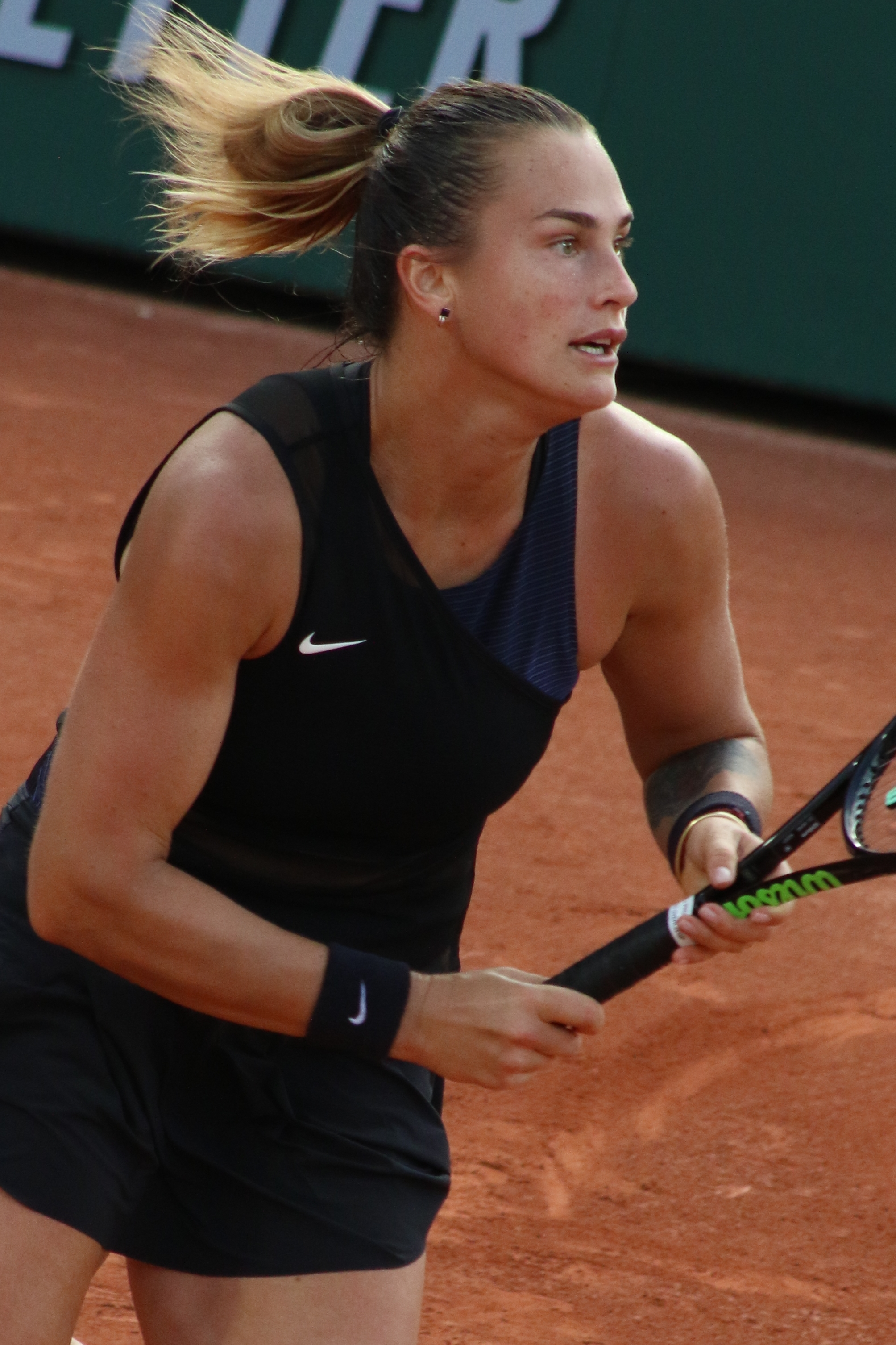
Aryna Sabalenka performed consistently throughout the year, despite struggles on serve.

On October 20, Aryna Sabalenka and Daria Kasatkina were announced as the sixth and seventh qualifiers, respectively.

Aryna Sabalenka suffered with service yips early in the year, losing in the first round of two events in Adelaide. Improvements began to manifest at the Australian Open, where she reached the fourth round. She would reach the quarterfinals of Doha, losing to Iga Świątek, but she lost early in Indian Wells and Miami. She would defeat Bianca Andreescu, Anett Kontaveit, and Paula Badosa in Stuttgart, losing to Iga Świątek in the final, and would also lose to Świątek in the semifinals of Rome. She would reach the third round of the French Open.

She would next reach the final of 's-Hertogenbosch, but could not participate at Wimbledon. She reached the semifinals of Cincinnati, and would also reach the semifinals of the US Open, losing for the fourth time in 2022 to the eventual champion, Iga Świątek. She would next lose in the quarterfinals of San Diego, and early in Guadalajara. Despite her consistent performance throughout the year, Sabalenka did not win a title in 2022.

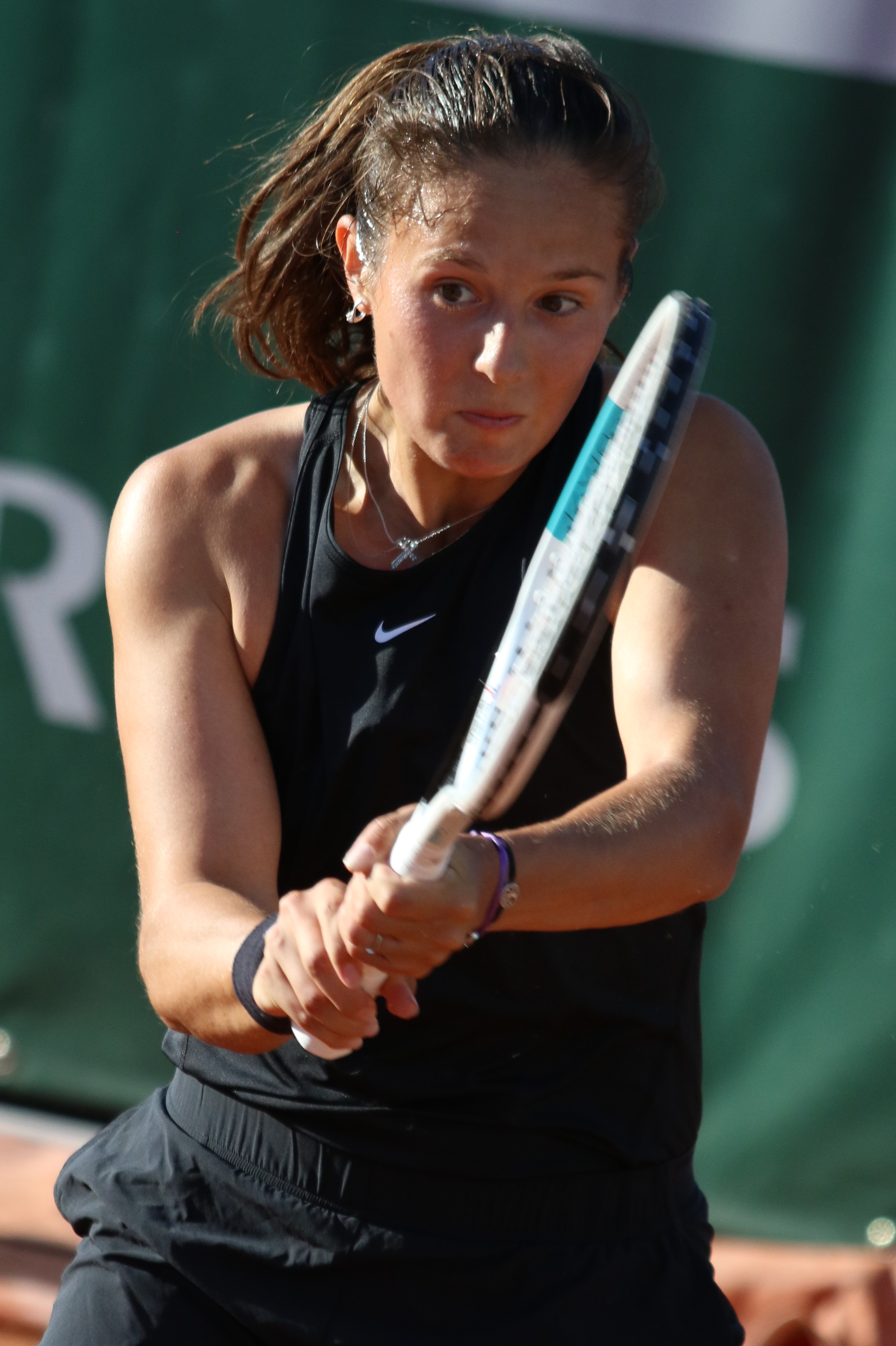
Daria Kasatkina reached her first Grand Slam semifinal, and won two singles titles.

Daria Kasatkina had a successful start to the year, reaching the semifinals in Melbourne and Sydney. She would suffer three early defeats at the Australian Open, Dubai, and Doha, all to Iga Świątek, and would also lose early at Indian Wells and Miami. She would perform well in Charleston and Madrid, and would reach the semifinals of Rome, losing to Ons Jabeur. She would reach her first Grand Slam semifinal at the French Open, defeating Camila Giorgi and Veronika Kudermetova, before losing once again to Iga Świątek. Kasatkina would reach the quarterfinals in Berlin, losing to Maria Sakkari, and would also reach the quarterfinals in Bad Homburg.

She would win her first title of the year in San Jose, defeating Elena Rybakina, Aryna Sabalenka, and Paula Badosa en route. After early losses in Toronto and Cincinnati, she would win a second title in Granby. Despite her success earlier in the year, Kasatkina would struggle with consistency following her second title, failing to clear the third round of any tournament for the remainder of the season.

=== Doubles ===
#	Players	Points	Date qualified
1	(Czech Republic) Barbora Krejčíková (Czech Republic) Kateřina Siniaková	4,651	September 12
2	(Canada) Gabriela Dabrowski (Mexico) Giuliana Olmos	4,335	September 26
3	(United States) Coco Gauff (United States) Jessica Pegula	4,086	October 14
4	Veronika Kudermetova (Belgium) Elise Mertens	3,770	October 13
5	(Ukraine) Lyudmyla Kichenok (Latvia) Jeļena Ostapenko	3,745	October 13
6	(China) Xu Yifan (China) Yang Zhaoxuan	3,580	October 19
7	(Kazakhstan) Anna Danilina (Brazil) Beatriz Haddad Maia	3,235	October 22
8	(United States) Desirae Krawczyk (Netherlands) Demi Schuurs	3,180	October 20

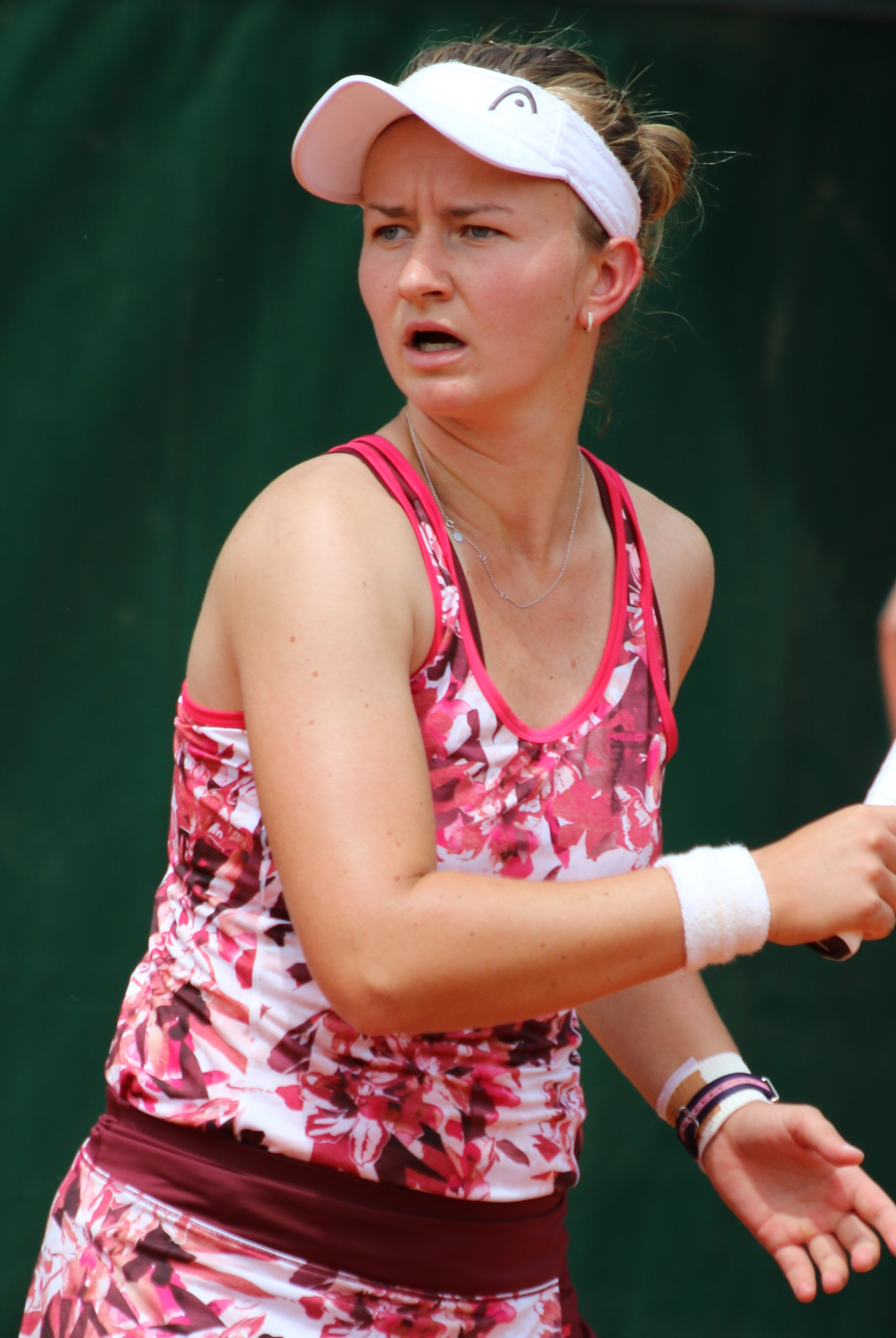
Krejčíková

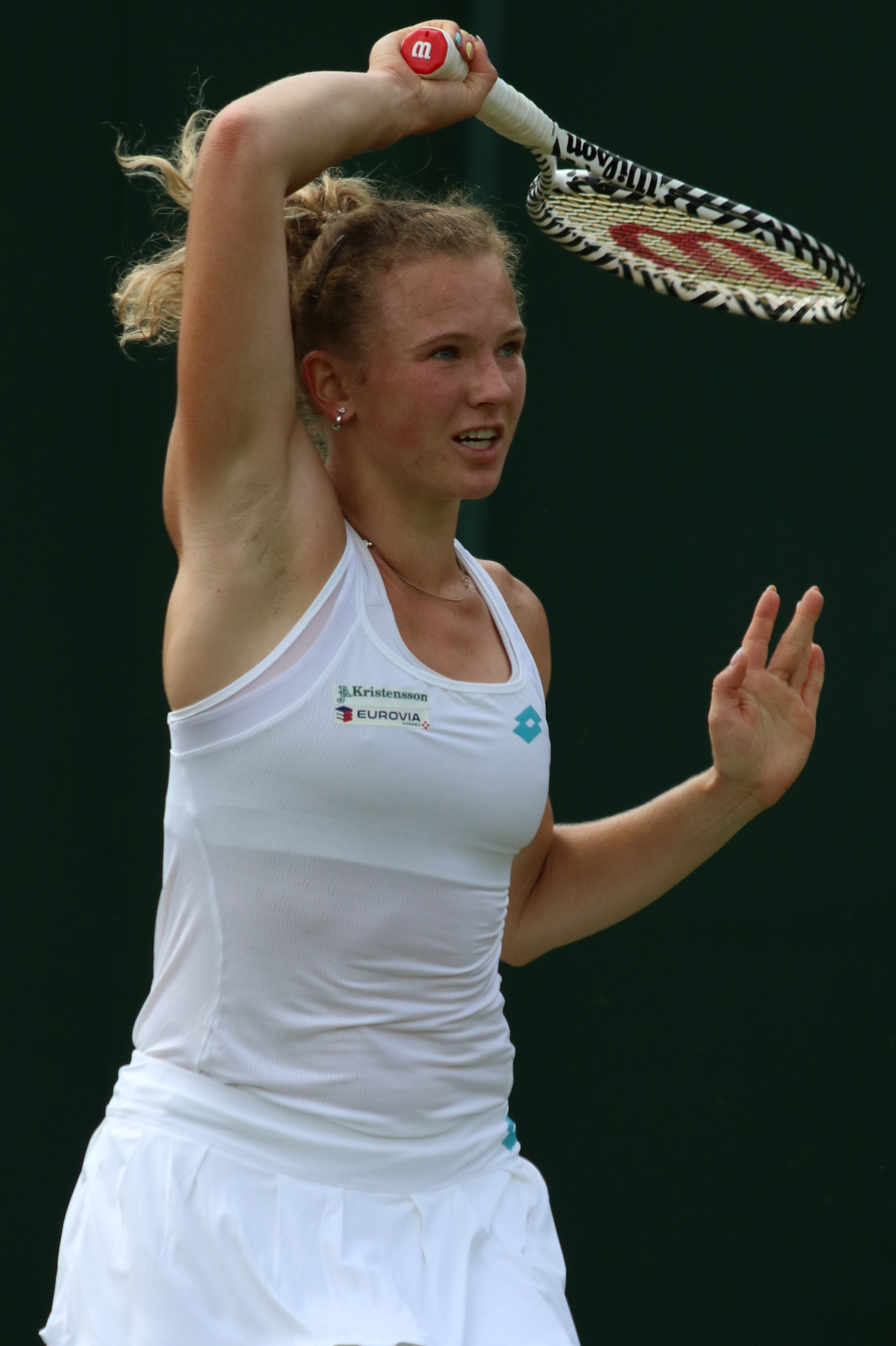
Siniaková

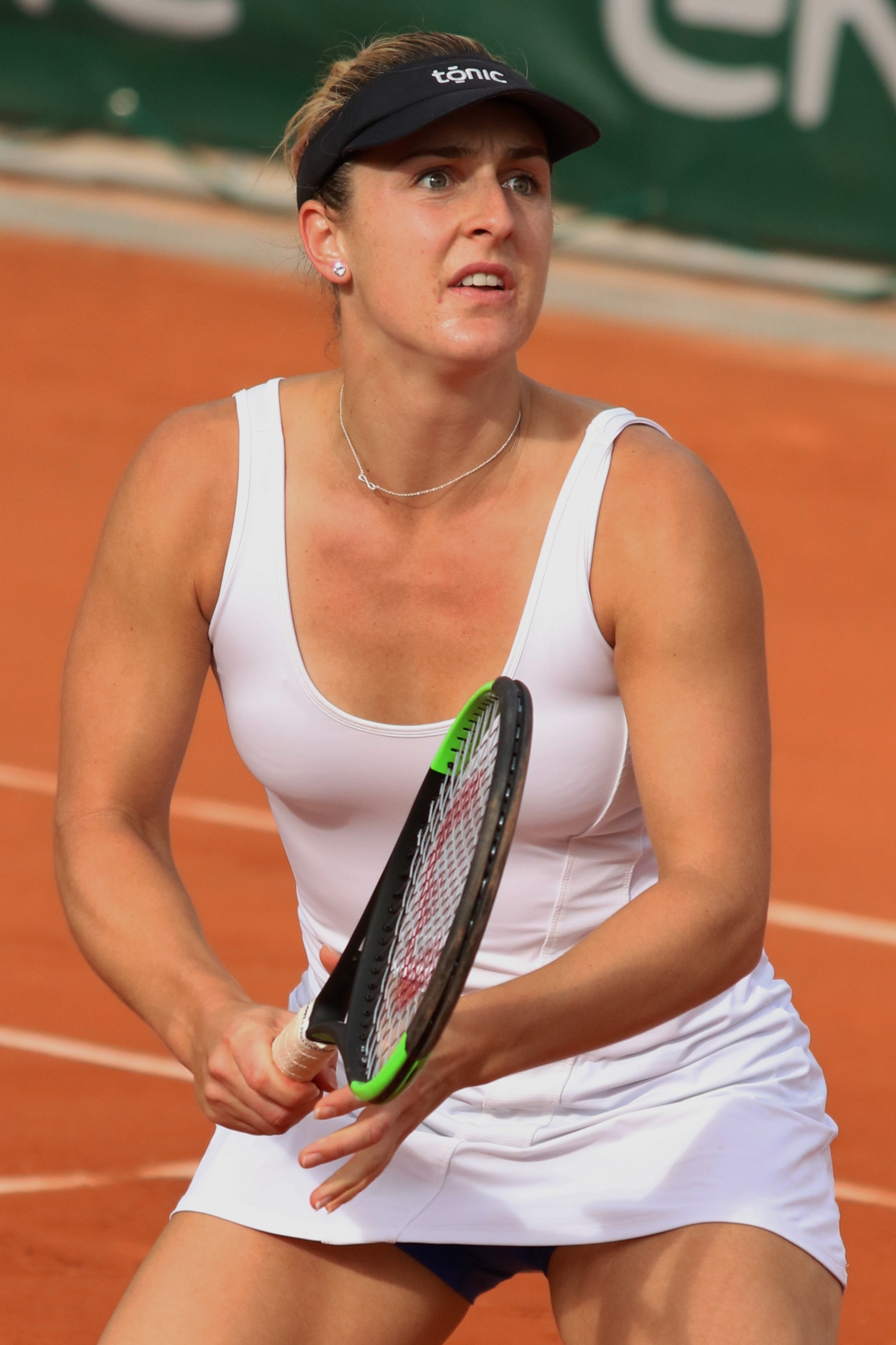
Dabrowski

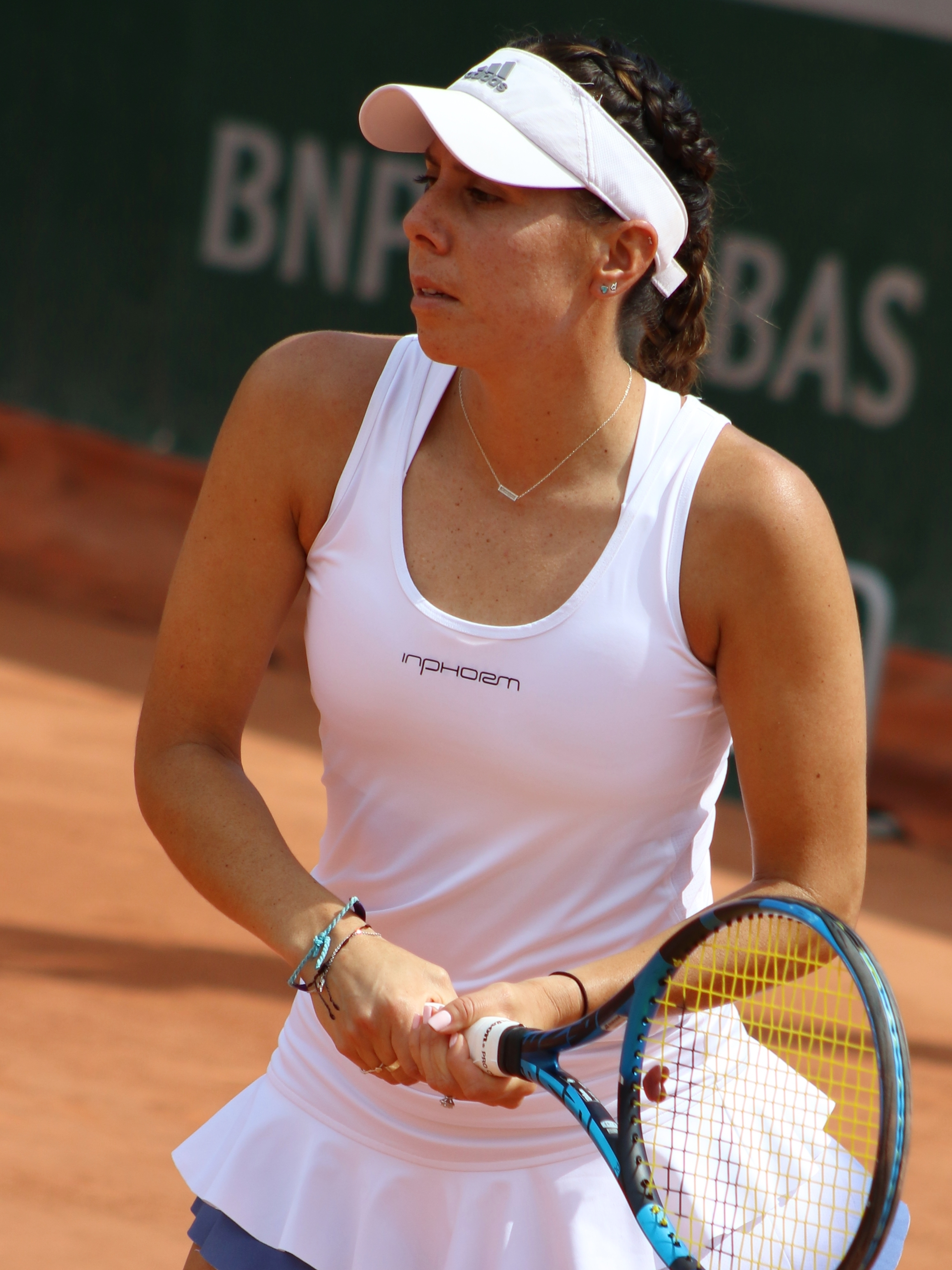
Olmos

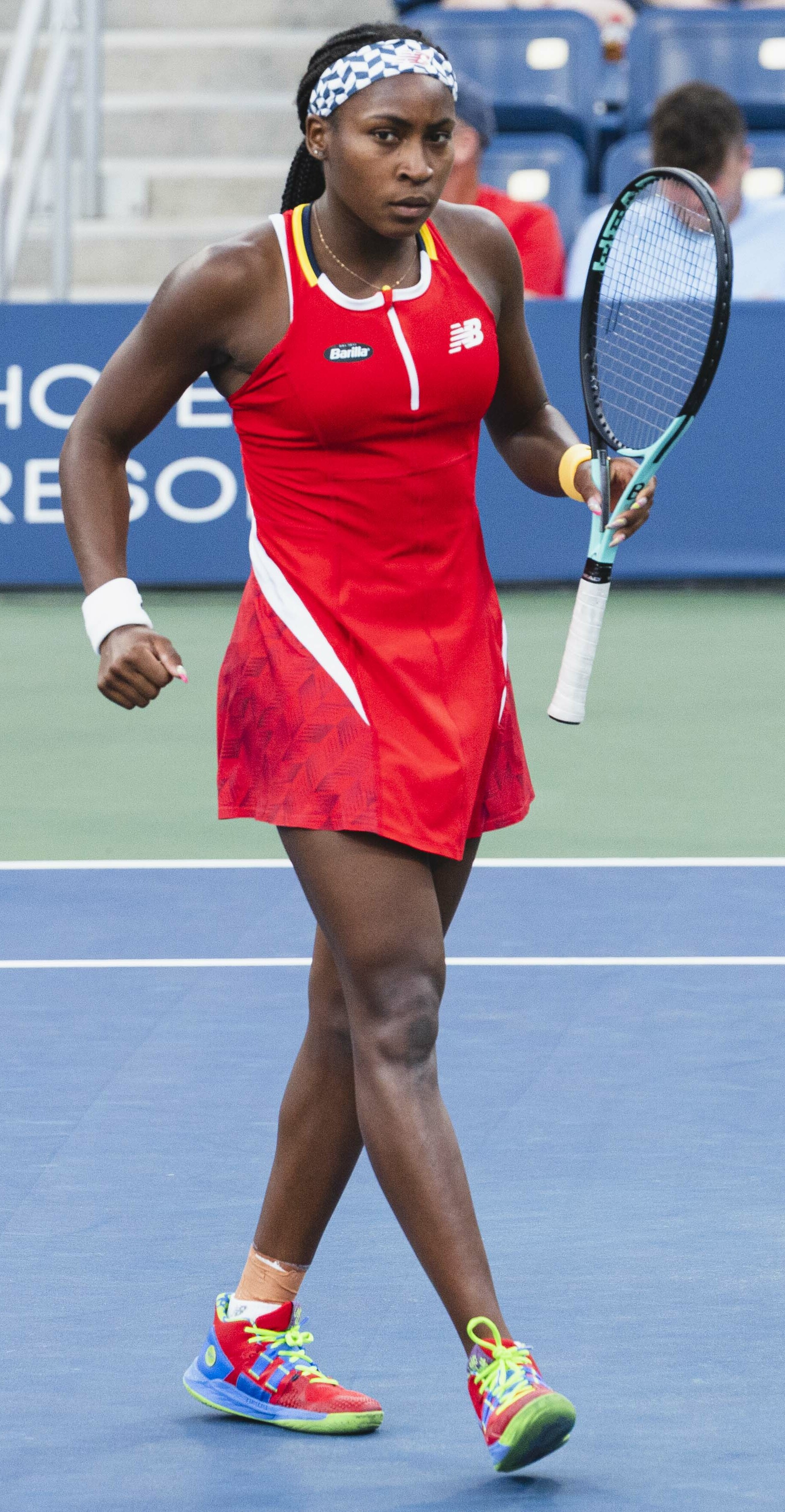
Gauff

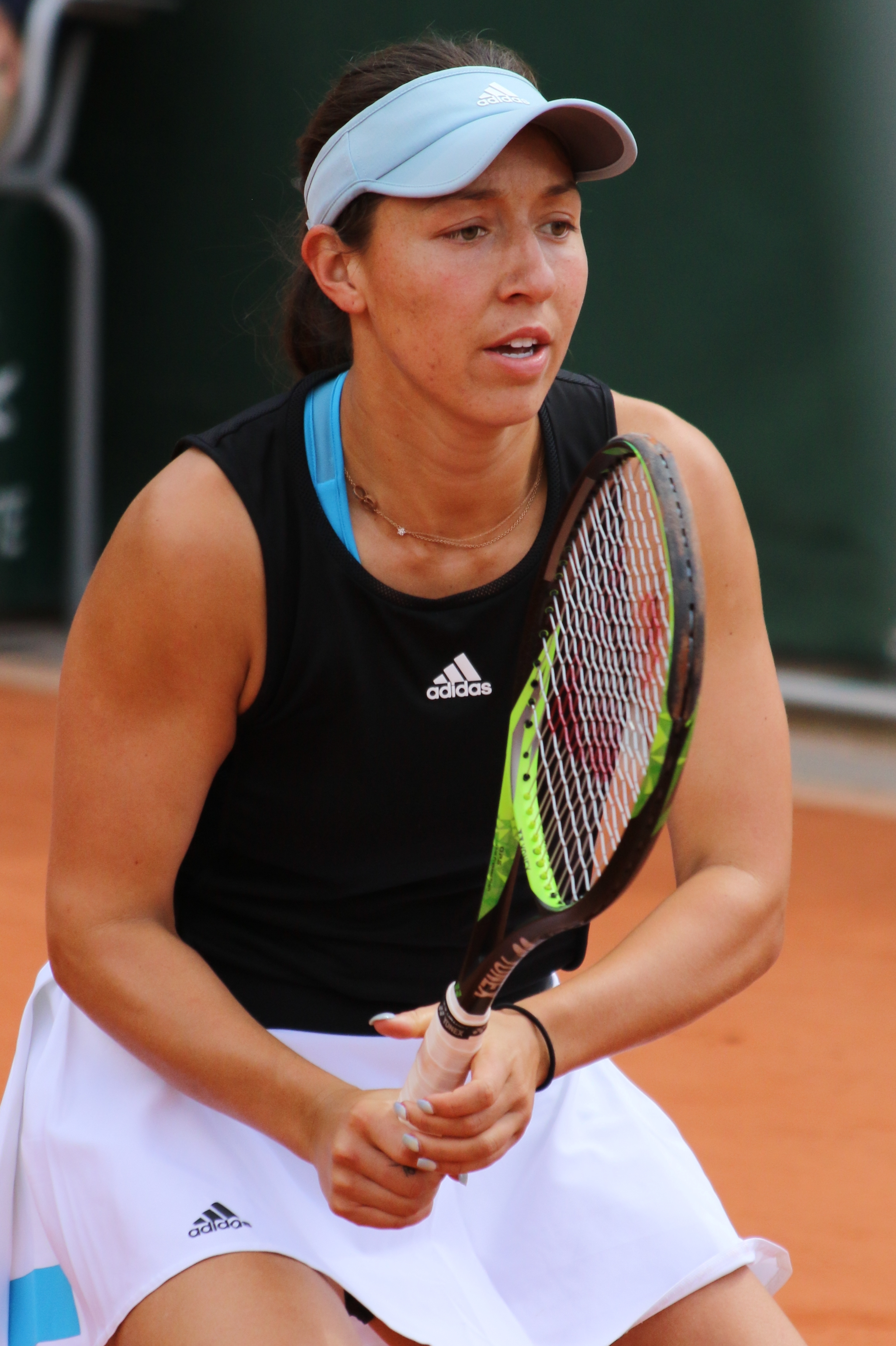
Pegula

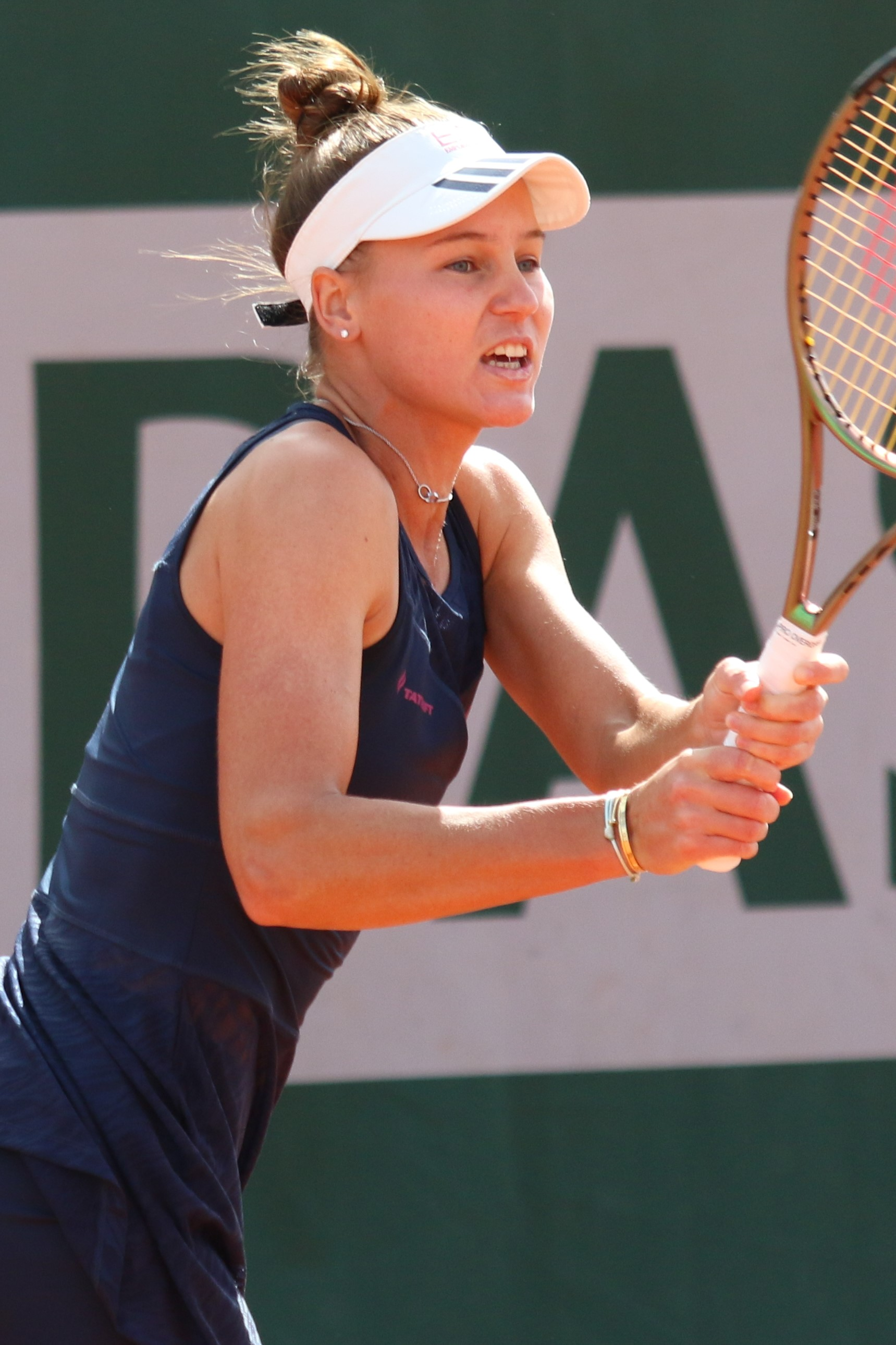
Kudermetova

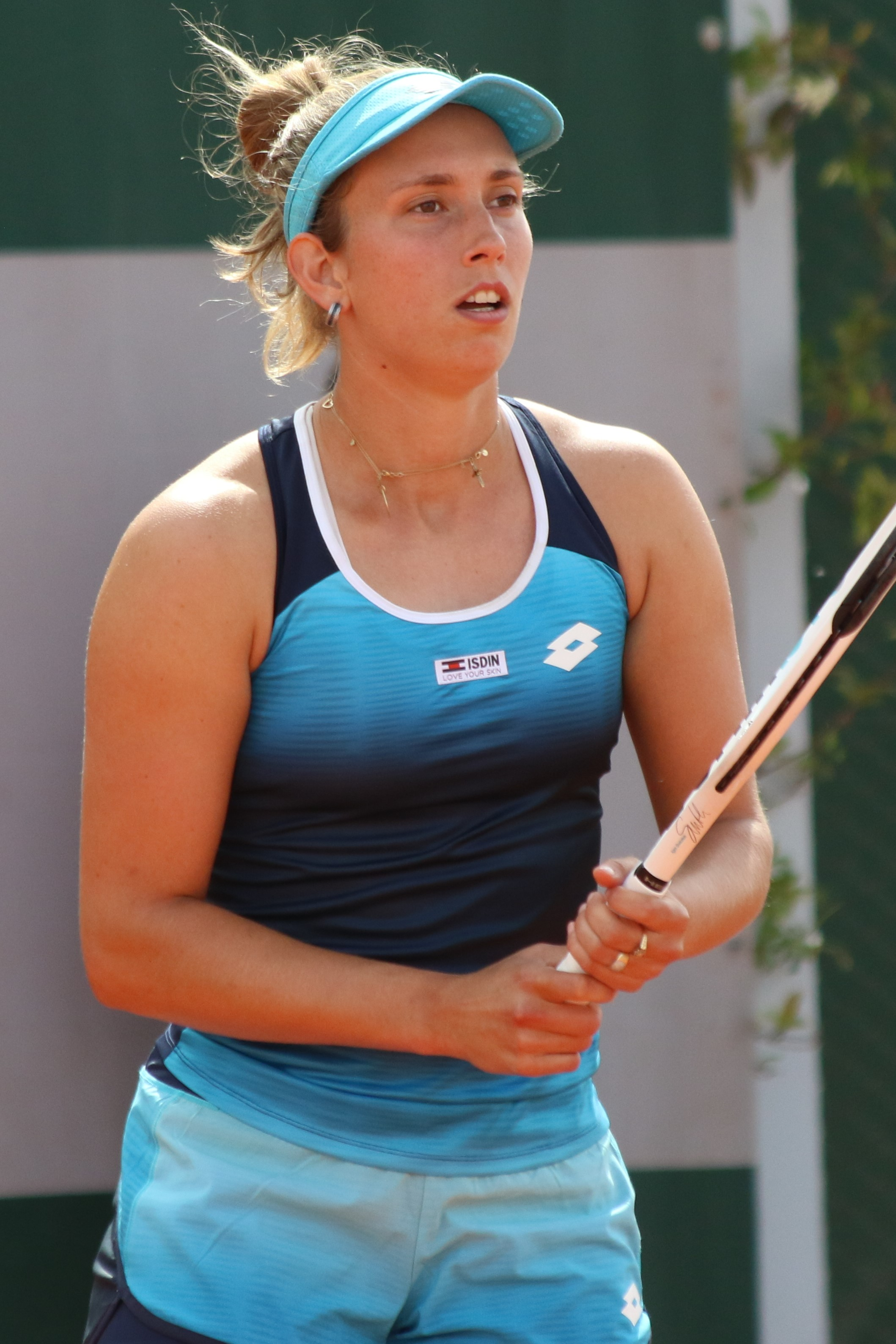
Mertens

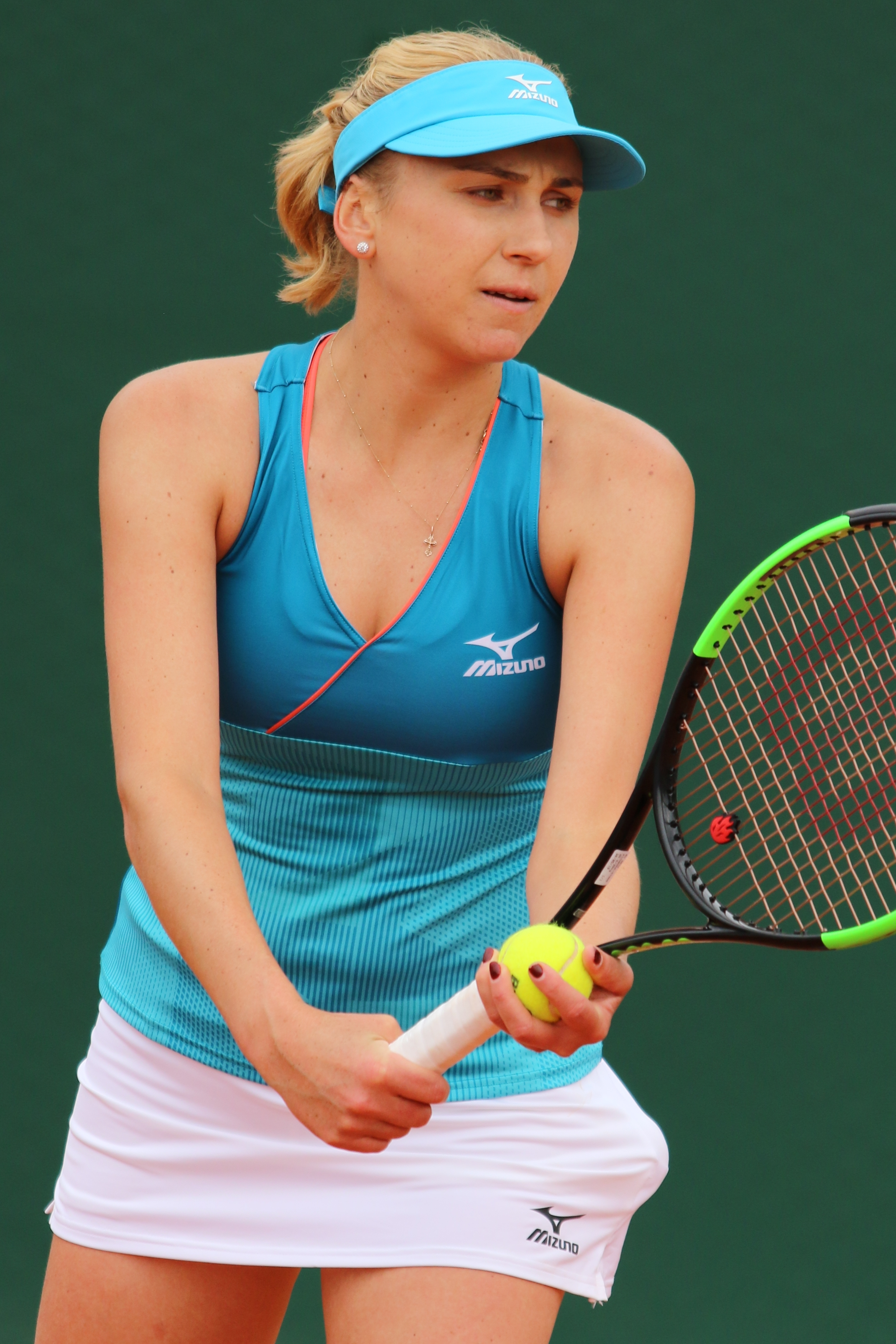
Kichenok

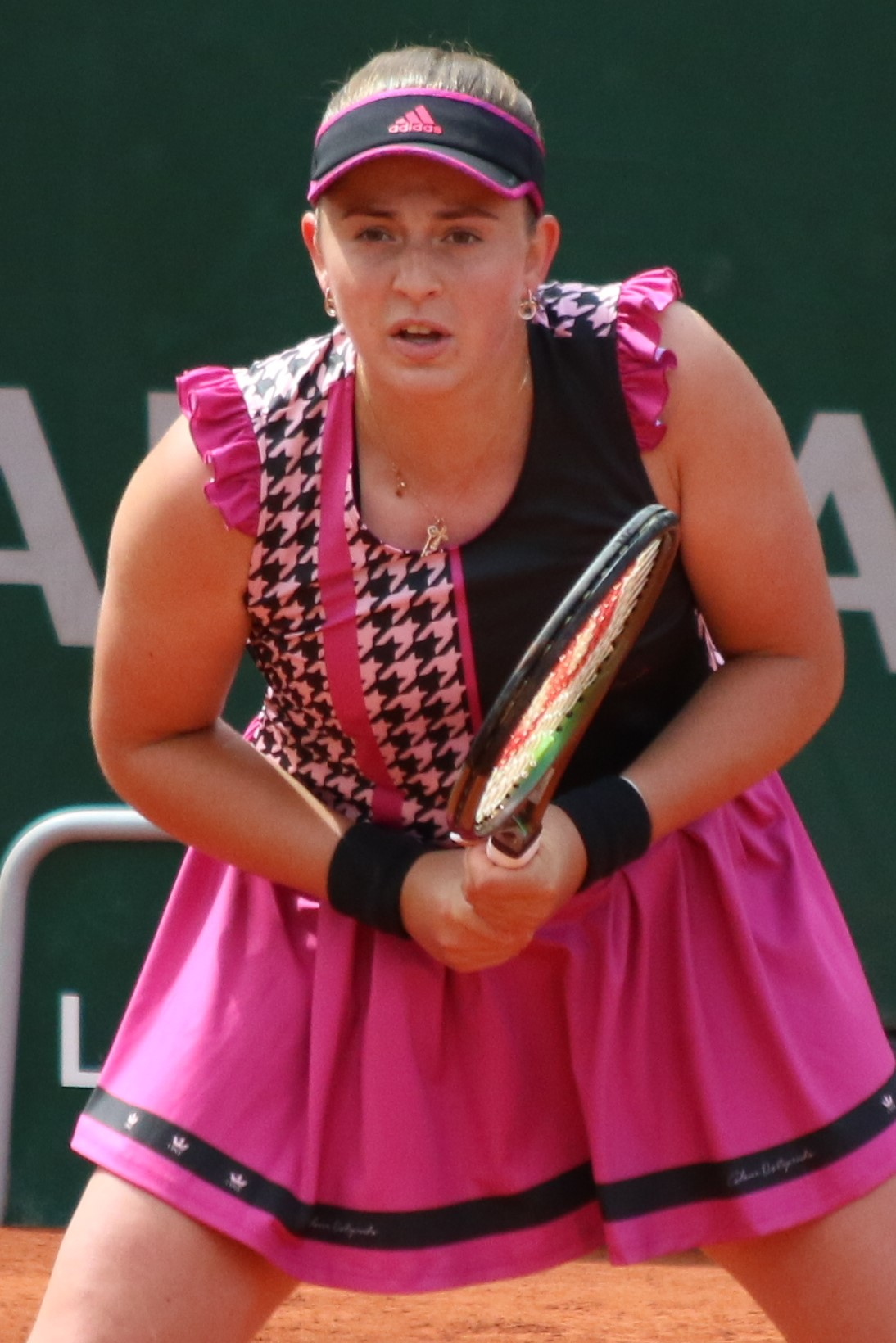
Ostapenko

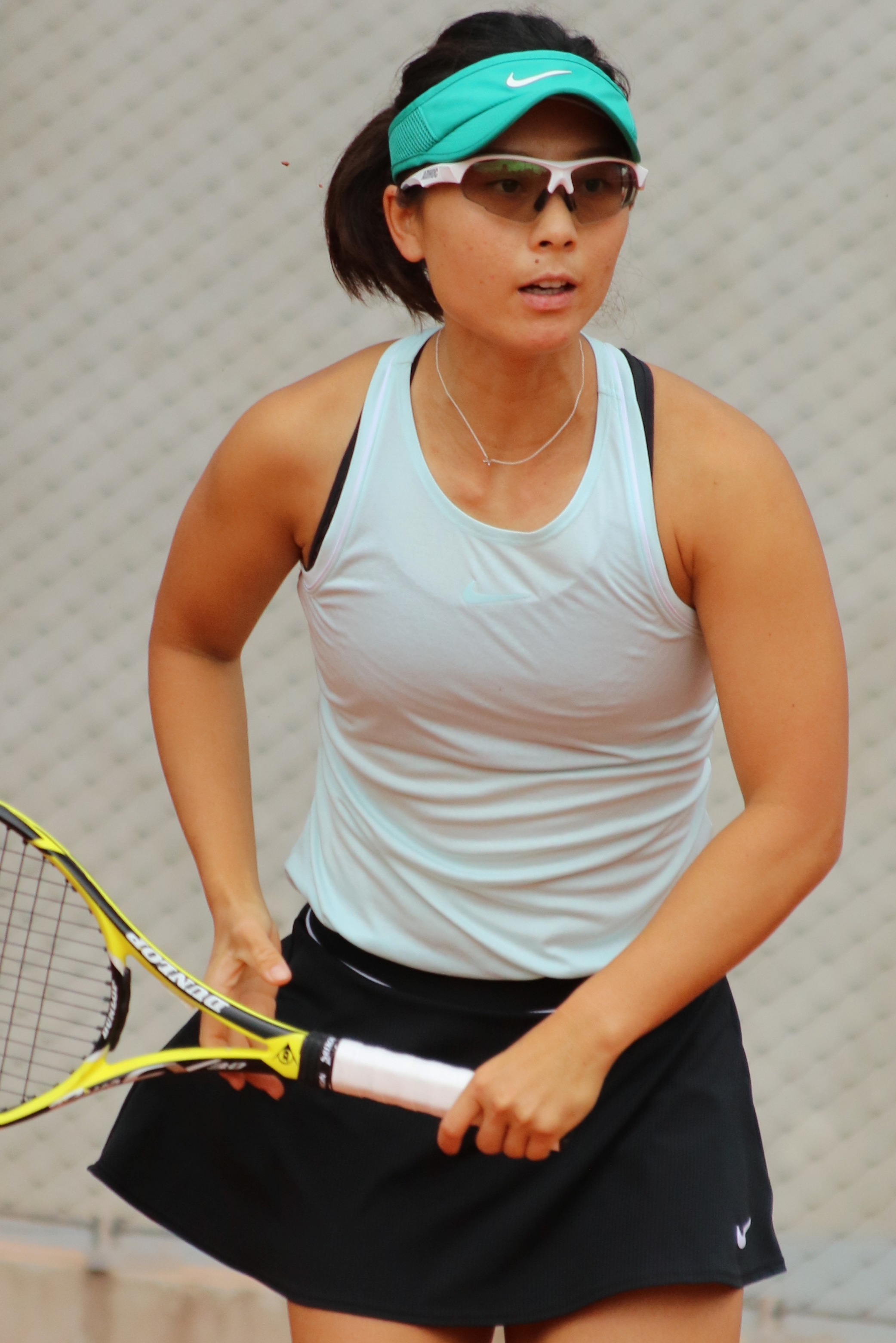
Xu

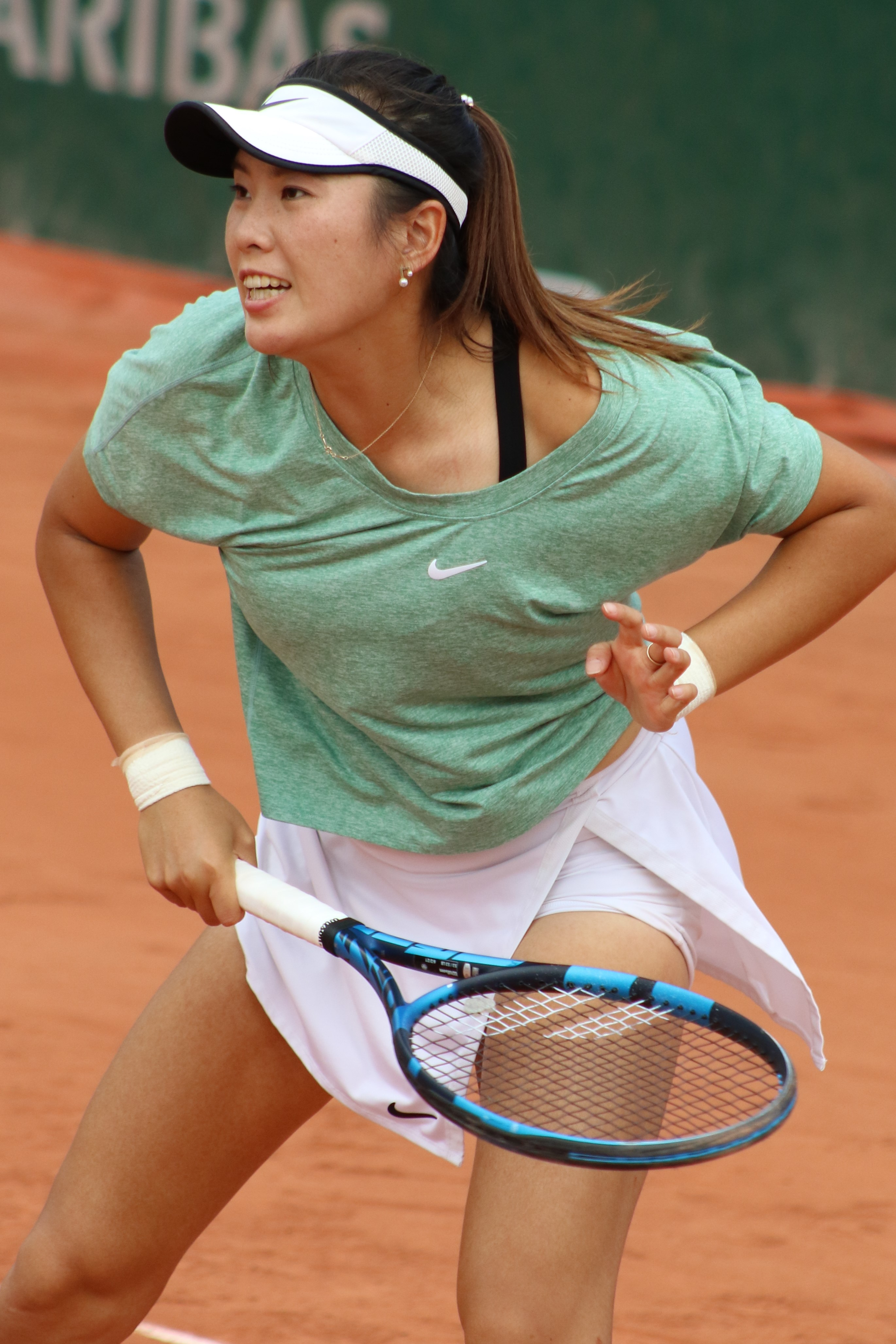
Yang

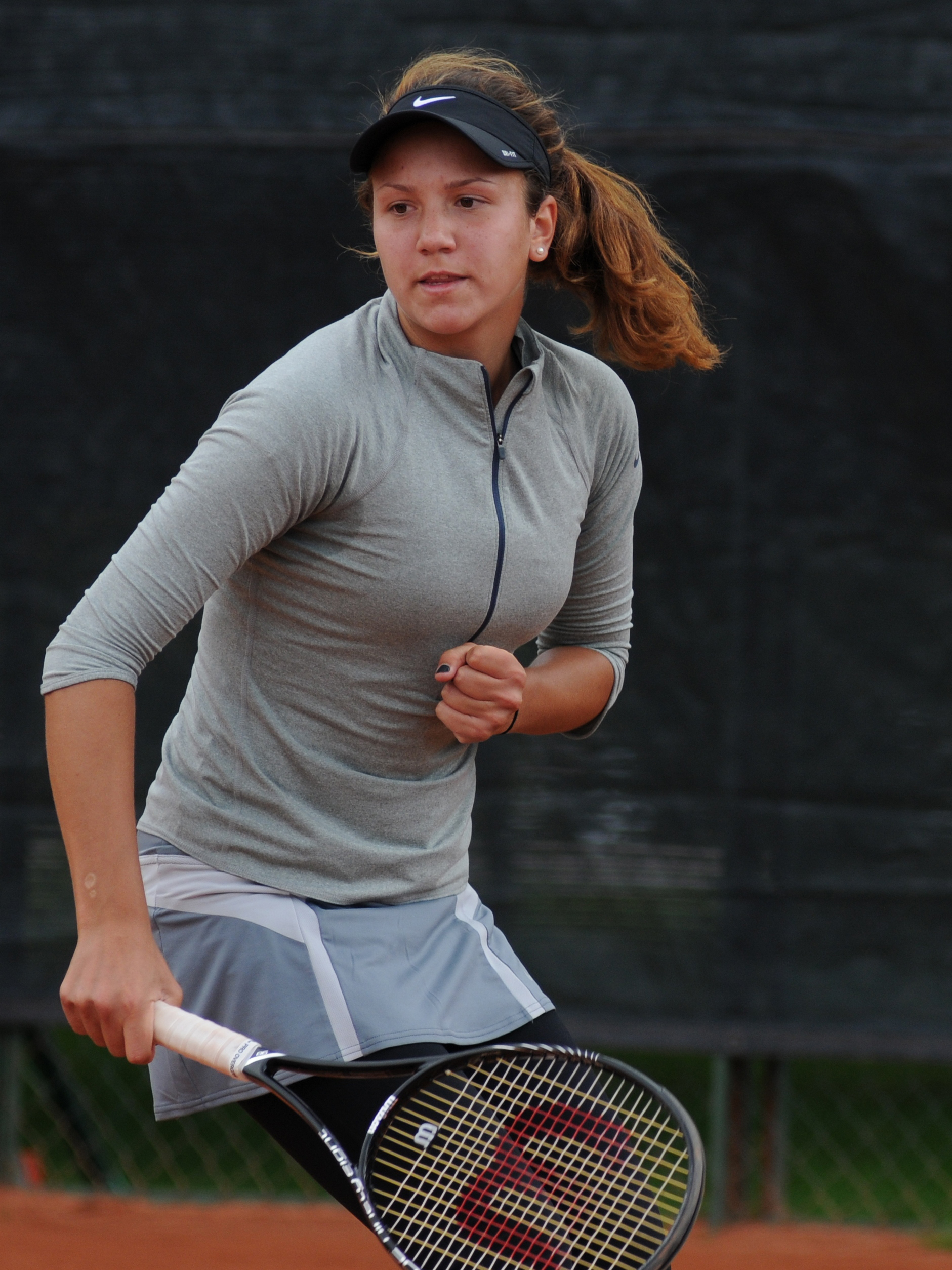
Danilina

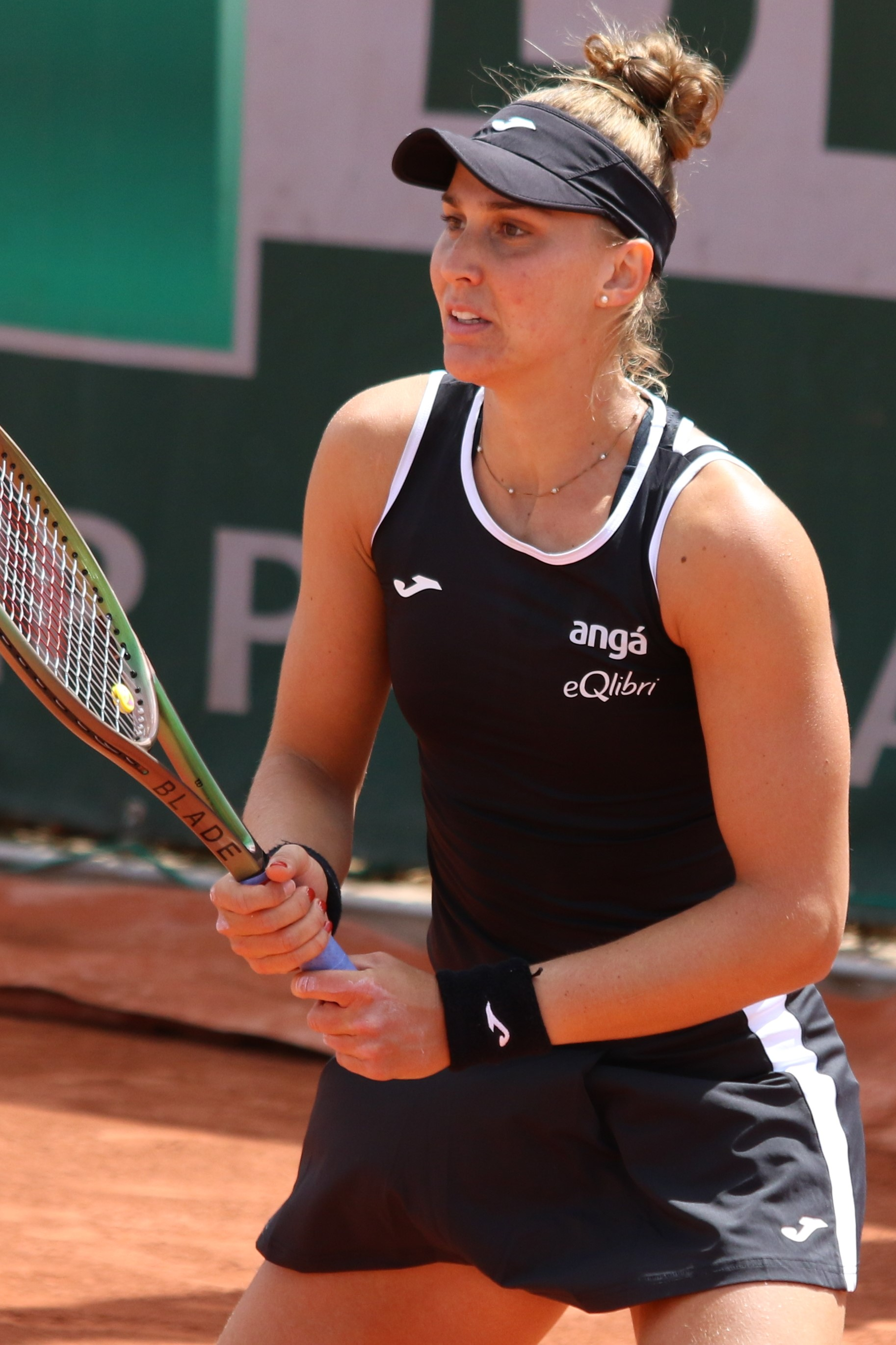
Haddad Maia

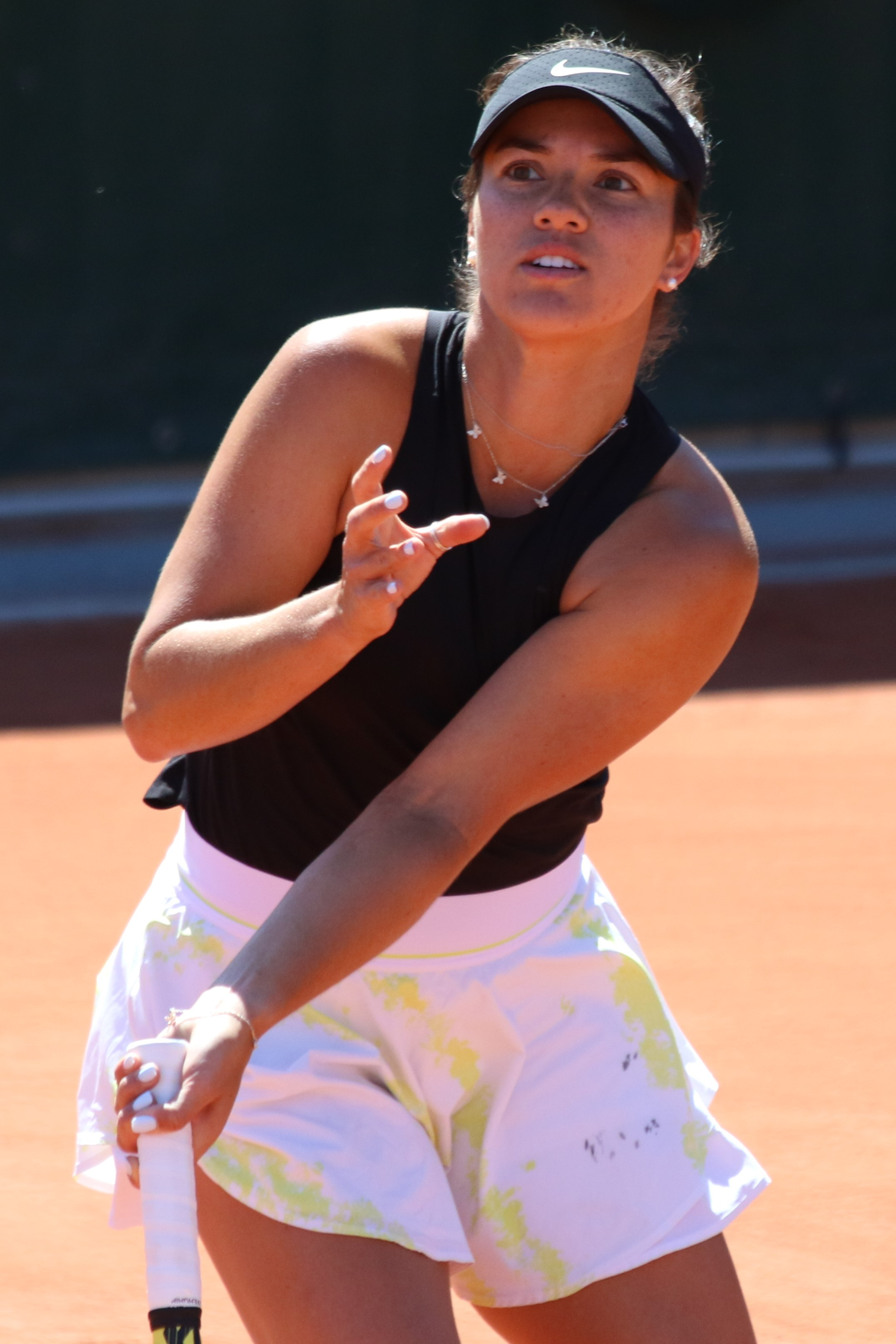
Krawczyk

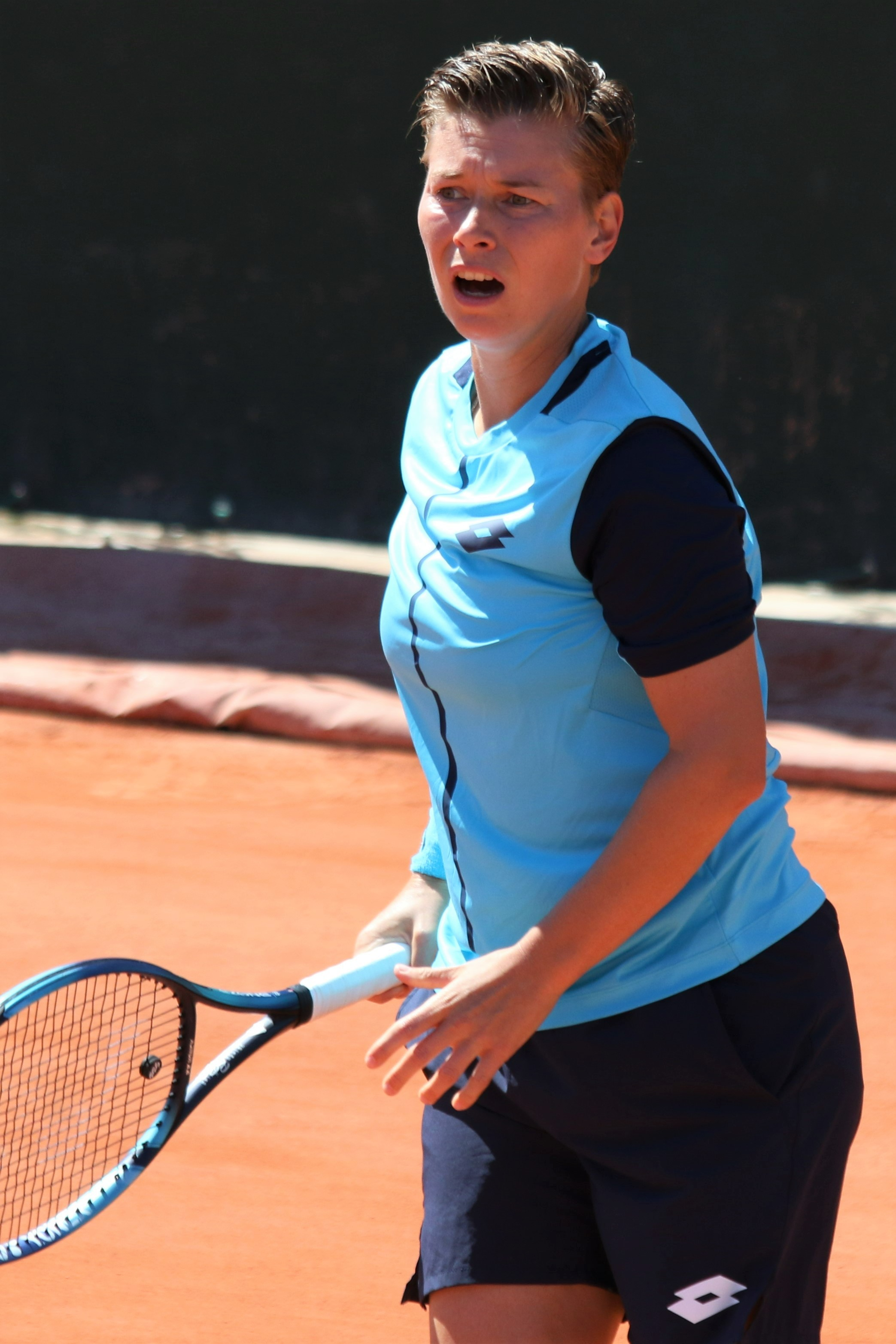
Schuurs

== Groupings ==
=== Singles ===
The singles draw of the 2022 edition of the Year–end Championships will feature one number-one and major champion, and two major finalists. The competitors were divided into two groups.

Group Tracy Austin (Poland) Iga Świątek [1] (United States) Coco Gauff [4] (France) Caroline Garcia [6] Daria Kasatkina [8]	Group Nancy Richey (Tunisia) Ons Jabeur [2] (United States) Jessica Pegula [3] (Greece) Maria Sakkari [5] Aryna Sabalenka [7]

=== Doubles ===
The doubles draw of the 2022 edition of the Year–end Championships will feature four number-ones, three major champions and two major finalist teams. The pairs were divided into two groups.

Group Rosie Casals (Czech Republic) Barbora Krejčíková [1] (Czech Republic) Kateřina Siniaková [1] (United States) Coco Gauff [3] (United States) Jessica Pegula [3] (China) Xu Yifan [6] (China) Yang Zhaoxuan [6] (United States) Desirae Krawczyk [8] (Netherlands) Demi Schuurs [8]	Group Pam Shriver (Canada) Gabriela Dabrowski [2] (Mexico) Giuliana Olmos [2] Veronika Kudermetova [4] (Belgium) Elise Mertens [4] (Ukraine) Lyudmyla Kichenok [5] (Latvia) Jeļena Ostapenko [5] (Kazakhstan) Anna Danilina [7] (Brazil) Beatriz Haddad Maia [7]

== Points breakdown ==
Updated as of 31 October 2022.

=== Singles ===
Player in gold (*) has qualified for the WTA Finals..
Player in brown (^{x}) is either serving a drug ban or retired from tennis.

Rank	Player	Grand Slam				WTA 1000					Best other								Total points	Tourn	Titles
Rank	Player	Grand Slam				Mandatory (Note: On 2 December 2021, the WTA announced that the 2022 China Open would be cancelled due to concerns regarding the security and well-being of tennis player Peng Shuai.)			Best two		Best other								Total points	Tourn	Titles
Rank	Player	AUS	FRA	WI (Note: As of 20 May 2022, the WTA announced that no ranking points will be awarded at the 2022 Wimbledon Championships due to the ban on Russian and Belarusian players.)	USO	IW	MI	MA	1	2	1	2	3	4	5	6	7	8	Total points	Tourn	Titles
1*	(Poland) Iga Świątek	SF; 780	W 2000	R32 –	W 2000	W 1000	W 1000	A 0	W 900	W 900	W 470	W 470	F 305	SF; 185	R16; 105	R16; 105	QF; 60	R16; 55	10,335	16	8
2*	(Tunisia) Ons Jabeur	A 0	R128; 10	F –	F 1300	R64; 10	R16; 120	W 1000	F 585	QF; 190	W 470	F 305	R16; 105	QF; 100	QF; 100	QF; 100	QF; 100	QF; 60	4,555	17	2
3*	(United States) Jessica Pegula	QF; 430	QF; 430	R32 –	QF; 430	R64; 10	SF; 390	F 650	W 900	SF; 350	QF; 190	SF; 185	R16; 105	R16; 105	R16; 55	R16; 55	R16; 30	R32; 1	4,316	18	1
4*	(United States) Coco Gauff	R128; 10	F 1300	R32 –	QF; 430	R32; 65	R16; 120	R16; 120	QF; 190	QF; 190	QF; 190	SF; 185	SF; 110	R16; 105	QF; 100	QF; 100	R16; 55	R64; 1	3,271	19	0
5*	(Greece) Maria Sakkari	R16; 240	R64; 70	R32 –	R64; 70	F 650	R64; 10	R32; 65	F 585	SF; 350	F 305	QF; 190	SF; 185	F 180	R16; 105	QF; 60	R16; 55	R32; 1	3,121	22	0
6*	(France) Caroline Garcia	R128; 10	R64; 70	R16 –	SF; 780	R64; 35	R128; 10	R16; 30	W 930	R16; 105	W 280	W 280	SF; 110	SF; 110	QF; 100	QF; 60	R32; 60	R16; 30	3,000	21	3
7*	Aryna Sabalenka (Note: As of 1 March 2022, the WTA announced that players from Russia and Belarus will not compete under the name or flag of Russia or Belarus due to the Russian invasion of Ukraine.)	R16; 240	R32; 130	A –	SF; 780	R64; 10	R64; 10	R64; 10	SF; 350	SF; 350	F 305	QF; 190	F 180	R16; 105	QF; 100	QF; 100	R16; 55	R16; 55	2,970	20	0
8*	Daria Kasatkina	R32; 130	SF; 780	A –	R128; 10	R32; 65	R64; 10	R16; 120	SF; 350	R16; 105	W 470	W 280	SF; 185	SF; 110	R16; 105	QF; 100	QF; 60	R16; 55	2,935	22	2
Alternates
9	Veronika Kudermetova	R32; 130	QF; 430	A –	R16; 240	QF; 215	R16; 120	R64; 10	QF; 190	R16; 105	F 305	SF; 185	SF; 185	F 180	F 180	SF; 110	SF; 110	QF; 100	2,795	20	0
–^{x}	(Romania) Simona Halep (Note: On 15 September 2022, Simona Halep announced she will miss the rest of the season after undergoing surgery.)	R16; 240	R64; 70	SF –	R128; 10	SF; 390	A 0	QF; 215	W 900	R32; 60	W 280	SF; 185	SF; 110	SF; 110	R32; 60	R16; 30	R64; 1		2,661	15	2
–^{x}	(Australia) Ashleigh Barty	W 2000	A 0	A –	A 0	A 0	A 0	A 0			W 470								2,470	2	2
10	(United States) Madison Keys	SF; 780	R16; 240	A –	R32; 130	QF; 215	R64; 10	R64; 10	SF; 350	R16; 105	W 280	QF; 100	R16; 55	R16; 55	R16; 55	R16; 30	R32; 1	R32; 1	2,417	20	1

=== Doubles ===
Team has qualified for WTA Finals.

Rank	Team	Points											Total points	Tourn	Titles
Rank	Team	1	2	3	4	5	6	7	8	9	10	11	Total points	Tourn	Titles
1	(Czech Republic) Barbora Krejčíková (Czech Republic) Kateřina Siniaková	W 2000	W 2000	SF; 350	QF; 190	SF; 110	R16; 1	W –					4,651	7	3
2	(Canada) Gabriela Dabrowski (Mexico) Giuliana Olmos	W 1000	F 585	W 470	QF; 430	SF; 390	SF; 350	F 305	R16; 240	QF; 190	QF; 190	SF; 185	4,335	20	2
3	(United States) Coco Gauff (United States) Jessica Pegula	F 1300	W 900	W 900	W 470	QF; 215	QF; 190	QF; 100	R64; 10	R32; 1			4,086	9	3
4	Veronika Kudermetova (Belgium) Elise Mertens	SF; 780	F 650	F 585	W 470	SF; 350	R16; 240	QF; 190	SF; 185	F 180	R32; 130	R32; 10	3,770	12	1
5	(Ukraine) Lyudmyla Kichenok (Latvia) Jeļena Ostapenko	W 900	SF; 780	SF; 390	F 305	F 305	W 280	R16; 240	QF; 190	R32; 130	R16; 120	R16; 105	3,745	16	2
6	(China) Xu Yifan (China) Yang Zhaoxuan	W 1000	W 470	QF; 430	SF; 350	R16; 240	R16; 240	QF; 190	SF; 185	SF; 185	SF; 185	R16; 105	3,580	19	2
7	(Kazakhstan) Anna Danilina (Brazil) Beatriz Haddad Maia	F 1300	F 585	W 470	R16; 240	QF; 190	SF; 185	R32; 130	R16; 105	R32; 10	R32; 10	R32; 10	3,235	12	1
8	(United States) Desirae Krawczyk (Netherlands) Demi Schuurs	F 650	W 470	QF; 430	SF; 350	SF; 350	QF; 190	SF; 185	SF; 185	R32; 130	R16; 120	R16; 120	3,180	15	1
Alternates
9	(United States) Nicole Melichar-Martinez (Australia) Ellen Perez	SF; 780	F 585	F 585	F 305	W 280	SF; 185	R16; 120	R16; 105	R16; 105	QF; 100	R64; 10	3,160	13	1
10	(France) Caroline Garcia (France) Kristina Mladenovic	W 2000	QF; 430	R32; 130									2,560	3	1

== Head-to-head records ==
Below are the singles head-to-head records as of 31 October 2022.

=== Singles ===
		Świątek	Jabeur	Pegula	Gauff	Sakkari	Garcia	Sabalenka	Kasatkina	Overall	YTD W–L
1	(Poland) Iga Świątek		3–2	4–1	4–0	2–3	1–1	4–1	4–1	22–9	64–8
2	(Tunisia) Ons Jabeur	2–3		3–2	2–3	2–1	3–0	1–2	4–2	17–13	46–15
3	(United States) Jessica Pegula	1–4	2–3		1–0	2–3	2–2	1–3	1–0	10–15	42–18
4	(United States) Coco Gauff	0–4	3–2	0–1		1–4	2–1	3–1	0–2	9–15	38–19
5	(Greece) Maria Sakkari	3–2	1–2	3–2	4–1		0–2	2–4	1–4	14–17	37–22
6	(France) Caroline Garcia	1–1	0–3	2–2	1–2	2–0		2–2	1–1	9–11	41–19
7	Aryna Sabalenka	1–4	2–1	3–1	1–3	4–2	2–2		3–2	16–15	30–20
8	Daria Kasatkina	1–4	2–4	0–1	2–0	4–1	1–1	2–3		12–14	40–20

=== Doubles ===
		Krejčíková; Siniaková	Dabrowski; Olmos	Gauff; Pegula	Kudermetova; Mertens	Kichenok; Ostapenko	Xu; Yang	Danilina; Haddad Maia	Krawczyk; Schuurs	Overall	YTD W–L
1	(Czech Republic) Barbora Krejčíková (Czech Republic) Kateřina Siniaková		1–0	0–0	1–0	2–1	0–0	1–1	0–0	5–2	23–3
2	(Canada) Gabriela Dabrowski (Mexico) Giuliana Olmos	0–1		0–1	0–1	1–1	0–1	0–1	2–0	3–5	35–18
3	(United States) Coco Gauff (United States) Jessica Pegula	0–0	1–0		1–0	1–0	1–1	0–1	2–1	6–3	19–6
4	Veronika Kudermetova (Belgium) Elise Mertens	0–1	1–0	0–1		1–1	2–1	0–0	0–0	4–4	26–9
5	(Ukraine) Lyudmyla Kichenok (Latvia) Jeļena Ostapenko	1–2	1–1	0–1	1–1		1–2	1–0	0–0	5–7	33–13
6	(China) Xu Yifan (China) Yang Zhaoxuan	0–0	1–0	1–1	1–2	2–1		0–0	0–2	4–6	28–19
7	(Kazakhstan) Anna Danilina (Brazil) Beatriz Haddad Maia	1–1	1–0	1–0	0–0	0–1	0–0		1–0	4–2	21–11
8	(United States) Desirae Krawczyk (Netherlands) Demi Schuurs	0–0	0–2	1–2	0–0	0–0	2–0	0–1		3–5	29–15

== See also ==
- 2022 WTA Tour
- 2022 ATP Finals
