= 2022 Toray Pan Pacific Open =

- Date: 19–25 September
- Edition: 48th
- Category: WTA 500
- Draw: 28S / 16D
- Surface: Hard / outdoor
- Location: Tokyo, Japan
- Venue: Ariake Coliseum

Champions

Singles
- Liudmila Samsonova

Doubles
- (Canada) Gabriela Dabrowski / (Mexico) Giuliana Olmos
← 2019 ·	Pan Pacific Open	· 2023 →

The 2022 Toray Pan Pacific Open was a professional women's tennis tournament played on outdoor hard courts. It was the 48th edition of the Pan Pacific Open, and part of the WTA 500 tournaments of the 2022 WTA Tour. It took place at the Ariake Coliseum in Tokyo, Japan. It was the first event since 2019, with the 2020 and 2021 events cancelled due to the COVID-19 pandemic. Unseeded Liudmila Samsonova won the singles title.

== Finals ==
=== Singles ===
- Liudmila Samsonova defeated (China) Zheng Qinwen 7–5, 7–5

This is Samsonova's third singles title of the season and fourth of her career.

=== Doubles ===
- (Canada) Gabriela Dabrowski / (Mexico) Giuliana Olmos defeated (United States) Nicole Melichar-Martinez / (Australia) Ellen Perez 6–4, 6–4

== Points and prize money ==
=== Point distribution ===
Event	W	F	SF	QF	Round of 16	Round of 32	Q	Q2	Q1
Singles	470	305	185	100	55	1	25	13	1
Doubles	470	305	185	100	1	—	—	—	—

== Singles main draw entrants ==
=== Seeds ===
Country	Player	Rank	Seeds
ESP	Paula Badosa	4	1
FRA	Caroline Garcia	10	2
ESP	Garbiñe Muguruza	12	3
	Veronika Kudermetova	13	4
BRA	Beatriz Haddad Maia	18	5
CZE	Karolína Plíšková	20	6
USA	Alison Riske-Amritraj	23	7
KAZ	Elena Rybakina	25	8

- Rankings are as of September 12, 2022

=== Other entrants ===
The following players received wild cards into the main singles draw:

- (Japan) Mai Hontama
- (Japan) Yuki Naito
- (Kazakhstan) Elena Rybakina

The following player used a protected ranking to enter the main draw:

- (United States) Sofia Kenin

The following players received entry from the singles qualifying draw:

- (Mexico) Fernanda Contreras Gómez
- (Greece) Despina Papamichail
- (Australia) Ellen Perez
- (Japan) Rina Saigo
- (Bulgaria) Isabella Shinikova
- (China) You Xiaodi

=== Withdrawals ===
Before the tournament

- (Romania) Sorana Cîrstea → replaced by (Australia) Daria Saville
- Daria Kasatkina → replaced by (China) Wang Xinyu
- (Kazakhstan) Yulia Putintseva → replaced by (China) Wang Qiang
- Aryna Sabalenka → replaced by (United States) Claire Liu

During the tournament

- (Japan) Naomi Osaka (abdominal pain)

=== Retirements ===
- (Australia) Daria Saville (torn ACL)

== Doubles main draw entrants ==
=== Seeds ===
Country	Player	Country	Player	Rank^{1}	Seed
	Veronika Kudermetova	BEL	Elise Mertens	7	1
CAN	Gabriela Dabrowski	MEX	Giuliana Olmos	19	2
USA	Desirae Krawczyk	NED	Demi Schuurs	28	3
USA	Nicole Melichar-Martinez	AUS	Ellen Perez	29	4

- Rankings are as of September 12, 2022

=== Other entrants ===
The following pair received a wildcard into the doubles main draw:

- (Japan) Misaki Doi / (Japan) Kurumi Nara

The following pair received entry as alternates:

- (Japan) Mai Hontama / (Japan) Yuki Naito

=== Withdrawals ===
Before the tournament

- (Brazil) Beatriz Haddad Maia / (China) Zhang Shuai → replaced by (Japan) Mai Hontama / (Japan) Yuki Naito
- (China) Xu Yifan / (China) Yang Zhaoxuan → replaced by (Japan) Miyu Kato / (China) Wang Xinyu
