= 2022 Dubai Tennis Championships – Men's doubles =

Men's doubles
- 2022 Dubai Tennis Championships

Final
- Champions: (Germany) Tim Pütz (New Zealand) Michael Venus
- Runners-up: (Croatia) Nikola Mektić (Croatia) Mate Pavić
- Score: 6–3, 6–7^{(5–7)}, [16–14]

Details
- Draw: 16
- Seeds: 4

Events
Singles	men	women
Doubles	men	women
← 2021 ·	Dubai Tennis Championships	· 2023 →

Tim Pütz and Michael Venus defeated Nikola Mektić and Mate Pavić in the final, 6–3, 6–7^{(5–7)}, [16–14] to win the doubles tennis title at the 2022 Dubai Tennis Championships. The pair saved three championship points en route to the win.

Juan Sebastián Cabal and Robert Farah were the defending champions, but chose to play in Acapulco instead.

== Seeds ==
1. (Croatia) Nikola Mektić / (Croatia) Mate Pavić (final)
2. (United States) Rajeev Ram / (United Kingdom) Joe Salisbury (first round, retired)
3. (Australia) John Peers / (Slovakia) Filip Polášek (semifinals)
4. (Germany) Tim Pütz / (New Zealand) Michael Venus (champions)

== Draw ==
=== Key ===
- Q = Qualifier
- WC = Wild card
- LL = Lucky loser
- Alt = Alternate
- SE = Special exempt
- PR = Protected ranking
- ITF = ITF entry
- JE = Junior exempt
- w/o = Walkover
- r = Retired
- d = Defaulted
- SR = Special ranking

=== Draw ===
First round
1	(Croatia) N Mektić (Croatia) M Pavić	6	3	[10]
(India) R Bopanna (Russia) A Karatsev	2	6	[5]
(Belgium) S Gillé (Belgium) J Vliegen	6	7
LL	(United Kingdom) D Evans (United Kingdom) K Skupski	4	5
3	(Australia) J Peers (Slovakia) F Polášek	7	7
WC	(India) S Myneni (India) R Ramanathan	5	5
(Poland) H Hurkacz (Italy) J Sinner	7^{8}	6
Q	(Kazakhstan) A Bublik (Turkey) A Çelikbilek	6^{6}	4
(Germany) K Krawietz (Germany) A Mies	2	4
(Kazakhstan) A Golubev (France) F Martin	6	6
LL	(Israel) J Erlich (Germany) J-L Struff	6	1	[5]
4	(Germany) T Pütz (New Zealand) M Venus	4	6	[10]
PR	(United States) A Krajicek (France) É Roger-Vasselin	6	6
WC	(United Arab Emirates) A Al Janahi (United Arab Emirates) O Al-Awadhi	0	0
(Netherlands) W Koolhof (United Kingdom) N Skupski	7^{7}	0
2	(United States) R Ram (United Kingdom) J Salisbury	6^{4}	0^{r}

Quarterfinals
1	(Croatia) N Mektić (Croatia) M Pavić	6	7^{7}
(Belgium) S Gillé (Belgium) J Vliegen	4	6^{3}
3	(Australia) J Peers (Slovakia) F Polášek	w/o
(Poland) H Hurkacz (Italy) J Sinner
(Kazakhstan) A Golubev (France) F Martin	6	3	[4]
4	(Germany) T Pütz (New Zealand) M Venus	4	6	[10]
PR	(United States) A Krajicek (France) É Roger-Vasselin	6	7^{7}
(Netherlands) W Koolhof (United Kingdom) N Skupski	4	6^{0}

Semifinals
1	(Croatia) N Mektić (Croatia) M Pavić	6	7
3	(Australia) J Peers (Slovakia) F Polášek	4	5
4	(Germany) T Pütz (New Zealand) M Venus	5	6	[10]
PR	(United States) A Krajicek (France) É Roger-Vasselin	7	3	[7]

Final
1	(Croatia) N Mektić (Croatia) M Pavić	3	7^{7}	[14]
4	(Germany) T Pütz (New Zealand) M Venus	6	6^{5}	[16]

== Qualifying ==
=== Seeds ===
1. (United Kingdom) Dan Evans / (United Kingdom) Ken Skupski (qualifying competition, lucky losers)
2. (Israel) Jonathan Erlich / (Germany) Jan-Lennard Struff (first round, lucky losers)

=== Qualifiers ===
1. (Kazakhstan) Alexander Bublik / (Turkey) Altuğ Çelikbilek

=== Lucky losers ===
1. (United Kingdom) Dan Evans / (United Kingdom) Ken Skupski
2. (Israel) Jonathan Erlich / (Germany) Jan-Lennard Struff

=== Qualifying draw ===
First round
1	(United Kingdom) Dan Evans (United Kingdom) Ken Skupski	7	6
WC	(Egypt) Karim-Mohamed Maamoun (Egypt) Mohamed Safwat	5	3
(Kazakhstan) Alexander Bublik (Turkey) Altuğ Çelikbilek	6	6
2	(Israel) Jonathan Erlich (Germany) Jan-Lennard Struff	4	4

Qualifying competition
1	(United Kingdom) Dan Evans (United Kingdom) Ken Skupski	5	6	[6]
(Kazakhstan) Alexander Bublik (Turkey) Altuğ Çelikbilek	7	4	[10]
