= 2022 Dubai Tennis Championships – Women's doubles =

Women's doubles
- 2022 Dubai Tennis Championships

Final
- Champions: (Russia) Veronika Kudermetova (Belgium) Elise Mertens
- Runners-up: (Ukraine) Lyudmyla Kichenok (Latvia) Jeļena Ostapenko
- Score: 6–1, 6–3

Details
- Draw: 16 (2 WC, 1 PR)
- Seeds: 4

Events
Singles	men	women
Doubles	men	women
- Dubai Tennis Championships

Veronika Kudermetova and Elise Mertens defeated Lyudmyla Kichenok and Jeļena Ostapenko in the final, 6–1, 6–3 to win the women's doubles tennis title at the 2022 Dubai Tennis Championships. Ostapenko was aiming to become the first woman to win both the singles and doubles titles in the same edition of the Dubai Tennis Championships.

Alexa Guarachi and Darija Jurak Schreiber were the defending champions, but lost in the first round to Coco Gauff and Jessica Pegula.

== Seeds ==
1. (Japan) Ena Shibahara / (China) Zhang Shuai (quarterfinals)
2. (Russia) Veronika Kudermetova / (Belgium) Elise Mertens (champions)
3. (Chile) Alexa Guarachi / (Croatia) Darija Jurak Schreiber (first round)
4. (Canada) Gabriela Dabrowski / (Mexico) Giuliana Olmos (first round)

== Draw ==
Key

- Q = Qualifier
- WC = Wild card
- LL = Lucky loser
- Alt = Alternate
- ITF = ITF entry
- PR = Protected ranking
- SR = Special ranking
- SE = Special exempt
- JE = Junior exempt
- JR = Junior Accelerator Programme entrant
- CO = College Accelerator Programme entrant
- NG = Next Gen Accelerator Program entrant
- w/o = Walkover
- r = Retired
- d = Defaulted

=== Draw ===
First round
1	(Japan) E Shibahara (China) S Zhang	7	6
(Japan) E Hozumi (Japan) M Ninomiya	5	4
WC	(United Kingdom) E Silva (Belgium) K Zimmermann	3	4
(Ukraine) L Kichenok (Latvia) J Ostapenko	6	6
4	(Canada) G Dabrowski (Mexico) G Olmos	6^{5}	6	[5]
(Japan) S Aoyama (Serbia) A Krunić	7^{7}	2	[10]
(Chinese Taipei) H-c Chan (Netherlands) D Schuurs	6^{3}	7	[9]
WC	(Czech Republic) L Hradecká (India) S Mirza	7^{7}	5	[11]
(China) Y Xu (China) Z Yang	7^{7}	6
(United States) S Kenin (Kazakhstan) Y Putintseva	6^{5}	2
(United States) C Gauff (United States) J Pegula	6	6
3	(Chile) A Guarachi (Croatia) D Jurak Schreiber	3	2
(United States) D Krawczyk (Australia) E Perez	7	3	[10]
PR	(Kazakhstan) A Danilina (Belgium) K Flipkens	5	6	[5]
(Ukraine) N Kichenok (Romania) R Olaru	6^{4}	6	[6]
2	(Russia) V Kudermetova (Belgium) E Mertens	7^{7}	4	[10]

Quarterfinals
1	(Japan) E Shibahara (China) S Zhang	0	1
(Ukraine) L Kichenok (Latvia) J Ostapenko	6	6
(Japan) S Aoyama (Serbia) A Krunić	5	3
WC	(Czech Republic) L Hradecká (India) S Mirza	7	6
(China) Y Xu (China) Z Yang	6	6
(United States) C Gauff (United States) J Pegula	2	3
(United States) D Krawczyk (Australia) E Perez	6	6^{5}	[7]
2	(Russia) V Kudermetova (Belgium) E Mertens	2	7^{7}	[10]

Semifinals
(Ukraine) L Kichenok (Latvia) J Ostapenko	2	6	[10]
WC	(Czech Republic) L Hradecká (India) S Mirza	6	2	[7]
(China) Y Xu (China) Z Yang	3	5
2	(Russia) V Kudermetova (Belgium) E Mertens	6	7

Final
(Ukraine) L Kichenok (Latvia) J Ostapenko	1	3
2	(Russia) V Kudermetova (Belgium) E Mertens	6	6
