= 2022 Dubai Tennis Championships – Women's singles =

Women's singles
- 2022 Dubai Tennis Championships

Final
- Champion: (Latvia) Jeļena Ostapenko
- Runner-up: (Russia) Veronika Kudermetova
- Score: 6–0, 6–4

Details
- Draw: 32 (6Q / 4WC / 1SE)
- Seeds: 8

Events
Singles	men	women
Doubles	men	women
- Dubai Tennis Championships

Jeļena Ostapenko defeated Veronika Kudermetova in the final, 6–0, 6–4 to win the women's singles tennis title at the 2022 Dubai Tennis Championships. She saved a match point en route to the title, in the quarterfinals against Petra Kvitová.

Garbiñe Muguruza was the defending champion, but lost in the second round to Kudermetova.

== Seeds ==
1. (Belarus) Aryna Sabalenka (second round)
2. (Czech Republic) Barbora Krejčíková (second round)
3. (Spain) Paula Badosa (first round)
4. (Spain) Garbiñe Muguruza (second round)
5. (Greece) Maria Sakkari (withdrew)
6. (Poland) Iga Świątek (second round)
7. (Estonia) Anett Kontaveit (withdrew)
8. (Tunisia) Ons Jabeur (quarterfinals)
9. (United States) Danielle Collins (first round, retired)
10. (Ukraine) Elina Svitolina (second round)

== Draw ==
Key

- Q = Qualifier
- WC = Wild card
- LL = Lucky loser
- Alt = Alternate
- ITF = ITF entry
- PR = Protected ranking
- SR = Special ranking
- SE = Special exempt
- JE = Junior exempt
- JR = Junior Accelerator Programme entrant
- CO = College Accelerator Programme entrant
- NG = Next Gen Accelerator Program entrant
- w/o = Walkover
- r = Retired
- d = Defaulted

=== Finals ===
Semifinals
(Latvia) Jeļena Ostapenko	2	7^{7}	6
(Romania) Simona Halep	6	6^{0}	0
(Russia) Veronika Kudermetova	w/o
Q	(Czech Republic) Markéta Vondroušová

Final
(Latvia) Jeļena Ostapenko	6	6
(Russia) Veronika Kudermetova	0	4

=== Top half ===
First round
1	(Belarus) A Sabalenka	6	6
Q	(Ukraine) M Kostyuk	4	1
(Czech Republic) P Kvitová	6	6
(Italy) C Giorgi	2	0
(United States) S Kenin	1	2
(Latvia) J Ostapenko	6	6
(Russia) D Kasatkina	1	2
6	(Poland) I Świątek	6	6
3	(Spain) P Badosa	3	7	4
Q	(Romania) E-G Ruse	6	5	6
WC	(United States) A Riske	2	4
(Romania) S Halep	6	6
(United States) C Gauff	4	4
(United States) J Pegula	6	6
WC	(Russia) V Zvonareva	2	6	5
8	(Tunisia) O Jabeur	6	2	7

Second round
1	(Belarus) A Sabalenka	4	4
(Czech Republic) P Kvitová	6	6
(Latvia) J Ostapenko	4	6	7^{7}
6	(Poland) I Świątek	6	1	6^{4}
Q	(Romania) E-G Ruse	3	2
(Romania) S Halep	6	6
(United States) J Pegula	3	1
8	(Tunisia) O Jabeur	6	6

Quarterfinals
(Czech Republic) P Kvitová	7	5	6^{9}
(Latvia) J Ostapenko	5	7	7^{11}
(Romania) S Halep	6	6
8	(Tunisia) O Jabeur	4	3

Semifinals
(Latvia) J Ostapenko	2	7^{7}	6
(Romania) S Halep	6	6^{0}	0

=== Bottom half ===
First round
10	(Ukraine) E Svitolina	6	6
WC	(Egypt) M Sherif	2	3
(Belgium) E Mertens	2	4
LL	(Switzerland) J Teichmann	6	6
(Russia) V Kudermetova	6	6
(Belarus) V Azarenka	3	4
Q	(Czech Republic) K Siniaková	6^{5}	6	2
4	(Spain) G Muguruza	7^{7}	2	6
9	(United States) D Collins	6	0^{r}
Q	(Czech Republic) M Vondroušová	2	3
LL	(Australia) A Tomljanović	1	5
Q	(Russia) V Gracheva	6	7
SE	(Romania) I-C Begu	6	2	3
Q	(Ukraine) D Yastremska	4	6	6
WC	(France) C Garcia	4	6^{0}
2	(Czech Republic) B Krejčíková	6	7^{7}

Second round
10	(Ukraine) E Svitolina	6^{0}	2
LL	(Switzerland) J Teichmann	7^{7}	6
(Russia) V Kudermetova	3	6	6
4	(Spain) G Muguruza	6	4	4
Q	(Czech Republic) M Vondroušová	6	6
Q	(Russia) V Gracheva	2	0
Q	(Ukraine) D Yastremska	6	7^{7}
2	(Czech Republic) B Krejčíková	3	6^{3}

Quarterfinals
LL	(Switzerland) J Teichmann	2	7	4
(Russia) V Kudermetova	6	5	6
Q	(Czech Republic) M Vondroušová	7	6
Q	(Ukraine) D Yastremska	5	4

Semifinals
(Russia) V Kudermetova	w/o
Q	(Czech Republic) M Vondroušová

== Qualifying ==
=== Seeds ===
1. (Switzerland) Jil Teichmann (qualifying competition, lucky loser)
2. (Denmark) Clara Tauson (second round)
3. (Russia) Liudmila Samsonova (second round)
4. (Switzerland) Viktorija Golubic (second round)
5. (Czech Republic) Markéta Vondroušová (qualified)
6. (Australia) Ajla Tomljanović (qualifying competition, lucky loser)
7. (United States) Amanda Anisimova (first round)
8. (Kazakhstan) Yulia Putintseva (qualifying competition)
9. (Czech Republic) Kateřina Siniaková (qualified)
10. (Poland) Magda Linette (second round, retired)
11. (Italy) Jasmine Paolini (second round)
12. (Ukraine) Marta Kostyuk (qualified)

=== Qualifiers ===
1. (Czech Republic) Kateřina Siniaková
2. (Ukraine) Dayana Yastremska
3. (Ukraine) Marta Kostyuk
4. (Russia) Varvara Gracheva
5. (Czech Republic) Markéta Vondroušová
6. (Romania) Elena-Gabriela Ruse

=== Lucky losers ===
1. (Switzerland) Jil Teichmann
2. (Australia) Ajla Tomljanović

=== Qualifying draw ===
==== First qualifier ====
First round
1	(Switzerland) Jil Teichmann	6	1	6
(Serbia) Aleksandra Krunić	3	6	3
(Latvia) Diāna Marcinkēviča	0	3
PR	(Belgium) Kirsten Flipkens	6	6
(Australia) Maddison Inglis	7^{7}	7^{7}
(Italy) Sara Errani	6^{4}	6^{1}
(Romania) Jaqueline Cristian	1	5
9	(Czech Republic) Kateřina Siniaková	6	7

Second round
1	(Switzerland) Jil Teichmann	6	6
PR	(Belgium) Kirsten Flipkens	0	2
(Australia) Maddison Inglis	0	0^{r}
9	(Czech Republic) Kateřina Siniaková	6	3

Qualifying competition
1	(Switzerland) Jil Teichmann	3	4
9	(Czech Republic) Kateřina Siniaková	6	6

==== Second qualifier ====
First round
2	(Denmark) Clara Tauson	6	6
(Hungary) Anna Bondár	2	2
(Kazakhstan) Anna Danilina	5	0
(Ukraine) Dayana Yastremska	7	6
(Australia) Astra Sharma	3	7^{7}	7
(France) Océane Dodin	6	6^{5}	5
(United States) Madison Brengle	7	7^{7}
7	(United States) Amanda Anisimova	5	6^{5}

Second round
2	(Denmark) Clara Tauson	5	7	2
(Ukraine) Dayana Yastremska	7	5	6
(Australia) Astra Sharma	2	0
(United States) Madison Brengle	6	6

Qualifying competition
(Ukraine) Dayana Yastremska	6	7
(United States) Madison Brengle	1	5

==== Third qualifier ====
First round
3	(Russia) Liudmila Samsonova	7	6
(Slovakia) Kristína Kučová	5	1
WC	(Kuwait) Sarah Behbehani	0	0
(United Kingdom) Harriet Dart	6	6
(Norway) Ulrikke Eikeri	5	5
(France) Diane Parry	7	7
(Australia) Ellen Perez	4	6	2
12	(Ukraine) Marta Kostyuk	6	3	6

Second round
3	(Russia) Liudmila Samsonova	6	3	6^{5}
(United Kingdom) Harriet Dart	2	6	7^{7}
(France) Diane Parry	2	2
12	(Ukraine) Marta Kostyuk	6	6

Qualifying competition
(United Kingdom) Harriet Dart	1	1
12	(Ukraine) Marta Kostyuk	6	6

==== Fourth qualifier ====
First round
4	(Switzerland) Viktorija Golubic	6	3	7^{7}
(United States) Bernarda Pera	3	6	6^{2}
(Russia) Varvara Gracheva	6	6
WC	(Japan) Eri Hozumi	1	1
(China) Zhu Lin	2	3
(Belgium) Maryna Zanevska	6	6
WC	(Russia) Angelina Gabueva	0	3
10	(Poland) Magda Linette	6	6

Second round
4	(Switzerland) Viktorija Golubic	3	6	4
(Russia) Varvara Gracheva	6	1	6
(Belgium) Maryna Zanevska	6	0
10	(Poland) Magda Linette	2	0^{r}

Qualifying competition
(Russia) Varvara Gracheva	6	6^{4}	6
(Belgium) Maryna Zanevska	1	7^{7}	3

==== Fifth qualifier ====
First round
5	(Czech Republic) Markéta Vondroušová	7^{7}	6
WC	(Japan) Ena Shibahara	6^{2}	3
(United States) Claire Liu	7^{7}	6
(Switzerland) Stefanie Vögele	6^{3}	3
(France) Kristina Mladenovic	4	6^{4}
(Poland) Magdalena Fręch	6	7^{7}
(China) Zhang Shuai	1	3
8	(Kazakhstan) Yulia Putintseva	6	6

Second round
5	(Czech Republic) Markéta Vondroušová	3	6	6
(United States) Claire Liu	6	4	1
(Poland) Magdalena Fręch	2	1
8	(Kazakhstan) Yulia Putintseva	6	6

Qualifying competition
5	(Czech Republic) Markéta Vondroušová	6	4	6
8	(Kazakhstan) Yulia Putintseva	2	6	4

==== Sixth qualifier ====
First round
6	(Australia) Ajla Tomljanović	6	6
(United States) Ann Li	0	4
WC	(Russia) Ekaterina Yashina	3	6	1
(United Kingdom) Heather Watson	6	3	6
(Russia) Anastasia Gasanova	2	5
(Romania) Elena-Gabriela Ruse	6	7
WC	(Mexico) Giuliana Olmos	4	4
11	(Italy) Jasmine Paolini	6	6

Second round
6	(Australia) Ajla Tomljanović	7	6^{3}	7^{8}
(United Kingdom) Heather Watson	5	7^{7}	6^{6}
(Romania) Elena-Gabriela Ruse	6	6
11	(Italy) Jasmine Paolini	3	1

Qualifying competition
6	(Australia) Ajla Tomljanović	1	5
(Romania) Elena-Gabriela Ruse	6	7
