= 2022 Toray Pan Pacific Open – Doubles =

Doubles
- 2022 Toray Pan Pacific Open

Final
- Champions: (Canada) Gabriela Dabrowski (Mexico) Giuliana Olmos
- Runners-up: (United States) Nicole Melichar-Martinez (Australia) Ellen Perez
- Score: 6–4, 6–4

Details
- Draw: 16
- Seeds: 4

Events
Singles	Doubles
← 2019 ·	Pan Pacific Open	· 2023 →

Gabriela Dabrowski and Giuliana Olmos defeated Nicole Melichar-Martinez and Ellen Perez in the final, 6–4, 6–4 to win the doubles tennis title at the 2022 Pan Pacific Open.

Chan Hao-ching and Latisha Chan were the defending champions from when the tournament was last held in 2019, but they competed with different partners. However, both lost to the team of Melichar-Martinez and Perez; Hao-ching lost in the first round alongside Shuko Aoyama and Latisha lost in the quarterfinals alongside Alexa Guarachi.

== Seeds ==
1. Veronika Kudermetova / (Belgium) Elise Mertens (semifinals)
2. (Canada) Gabriela Dabrowski / (Mexico) Giuliana Olmos (champions)
3. (United States) Desirae Krawczyk / (Netherlands) Demi Schuurs (semifinals)
4. (United States) Nicole Melichar-Martinez / (Australia) Ellen Perez (final)

== Draw ==
=== Key ===
- Q = Qualifier
- WC = Wild card
- LL = Lucky loser
- Alt = Alternate
- ITF = ITF entry
- PR = Protected ranking
- SR = Special ranking
- SE = Special exempt
- JE = Junior exempt
- JR = Junior Accelerator Programme entrant
- CO = College Accelerator Programme entrant
- NG = Next Gen Accelerator Program entrant
- w/o = Walkover
- r = Retired
- d = Defaulted

=== Draw ===
First Round
1	V Kudermetova (Belgium) E Mertens	6	6
(Japan) E Hozumi (Japan) M Ninomiya	1	4
Alt	(Japan) M Hontama (Japan) Y Naito	1	3
(Mexico) F Contreras Gómez (Greece) D Papamichail	6	6
4	(United States) N Melichar-Martinez (Australia) E Perez	2	6	[10]
(Japan) S Aoyama (Chinese Taipei) H-c Chan	6	3	[8]
(Japan) M Kato (China) Xin Wang	4	6	[5]
(Chinese Taipei) L Chan (Chile) A Guarachi	6	4	[10]
WC	(Japan) M Doi (Japan) K Nara	2	4
(United States) S Kenin; L Samsonova	6	6
(Poland) A Rosolska (New Zealand) E Routliffe	5	3
3	(United States) D Krawczyk (Netherlands) D Schuurs	7	6
(Japan) N Hibino (Canada) C Zhao	5	3
(United States) S Chang (Poland) K Kawa	7	6
(Japan) E Shibahara (Brazil) L Stefani	3	1
2	(Canada) G Dabrowski (Mexico) G Olmos	6	6

Quarterfinals
1	V Kudermetova (Belgium) E Mertens	6	6
(Mexico) F Contreras Gómez (Greece) D Papamichail	0	3
4	(United States) N Melichar-Martinez (Australia) E Perez	7^{7}	6
(Chinese Taipei) L Chan (Chile) A Guarachi	6^{3}	4
(United States) S Kenin; L Samsonova	3	5
3	(United States) D Krawczyk (Netherlands) D Schuurs	6	7
(United States) S Chang (Poland) K Kawa	2	4
2	(Canada) G Dabrowski (Mexico) G Olmos	6	6

Semifinals
1	V Kudermetova (Belgium) E Mertens	3	6	[6]
4	(United States) N Melichar-Martinez (Australia) E Perez	6	3	[10]
3	(United States) D Krawczyk (Netherlands) D Schuurs	6^{6}	3
2	(Canada) G Dabrowski (Mexico) G Olmos	7^{8}	6

Final
4	(United States) N Melichar-Martinez (Australia) E Perez	4	4
2	(Canada) G Dabrowski (Mexico) G Olmos	6	6
