= 2022 Toray Pan Pacific Open – Singles =

Singles
- 2022 Toray Pan Pacific Open

Final
- Champion: Liudmila Samsonova
- Runner-up: (China) Zheng Qinwen
- Score: 7–5, 7–5

Details
- Draw: 28
- Seeds: 8

Events
Singles	Doubles
← 2019 ·	Pan Pacific Open	· 2023 →

Liudmila Samsonova defeated Zheng Qinwen in the final, 7–5, 7–5 to win the singles tennis title at the 2022 Pan Pacific Open. She did not drop a set en route to her third title of the season. By reaching her first WTA Tour final as a 19-year-old, Zheng became the first Chinese teenager to contest a WTA singles final.

Naomi Osaka was the defending champion from when the event was last held in 2019, but withdrew from her second round match against Beatriz Haddad Maia.

== Seeds ==
The top four seeds received a bye into the second round.

1. (Spain) Paula Badosa (second round)
2. (France) Caroline Garcia (second round)
3. (Spain) Garbiñe Muguruza (quarterfinals)
4. Veronika Kudermetova (semifinals)
5. (Brazil) Beatriz Haddad Maia (quarterfinals)
6. (Czech Republic) Karolína Plíšková (second round)
7. (United States) Alison Riske-Amritraj (first round)
8. (Kazakhstan) Elena Rybakina (first round)

== Draw ==
=== Key ===
- Q = Qualifier
- WC = Wild card
- LL = Lucky loser
- Alt = Alternate
- ITF = ITF entry
- PR = Protected ranking
- SR = Special ranking
- SE = Special exempt
- JE = Junior exempt
- JR = Junior Accelerator Programme entrant
- CO = College Accelerator Programme entrant
- NG = Next Gen Accelerator Program entrant
- w/o = Walkover
- r = Retired
- d = Defaulted

=== Finals ===
Semifinals
(China) Zheng Qinwen	5	6	7^{7}
4	Veronika Kudermetova	7	3	6^{3}
Liudmila Samsonova	7^{7}	6
(China) Zhang Shuai	6^{4}	2

Final
(China) Zheng Qinwen	5	5
Liudmila Samsonova	7	7

=== Top half ===
First round
(China) Q Zheng	6	6
(Japan) M Doi	2	4
(China) Q Wang	0	3
(Belgium) E Mertens	6	6
(United States) C Liu	6	6
7	(United States) A Riske-Amritraj	2	3
PR	(United States) S Kenin	6^{7}	4
Q	(Mexico) F Contreras Gómez	7^{9}	6
(Japan) N Osaka	1
(Australia) D Saville	0^{r}
WC	(Japan) Y Naito	4	2
5	(Brazil) B Haddad Maia	6	6

Second round
1	(Spain) P Badosa	3	2
(China) Q Zheng	6	6
(Belgium) E Mertens	4	1
(United States) C Liu	6	6
4	V Kudermetova	6	6
Q	(Mexico) F Contreras Gómez	0	1
(Japan) N Osaka
5	(Brazil) B Haddad Maia	w/o

Quarterfinals
(China) Q Zheng	6	7
(United States) C Liu	4	5
4	V Kudermetova	6^{4}	7^{8}	6
5	(Brazil) B Haddad Maia	7^{7}	6^{6}	1

Semifinals
(China) Q Zheng	5	6	7^{7}
4	V Kudermetova	7	3	6^{3}

=== Bottom half ===
First round
8/WC	(Kazakhstan) E Rybakina	2	4
L Samsonova	6	6
(China) Xin Wang	7	1	6
Q	(Australia) E Perez	5	6	4
Q	(China) X You	4	2
Q	(Greece) D Papamichail	6	6
6	(Czech Republic) Ka Plíšková	6	6
Q	(Bulgaria) I Shinikova	2	1
(Croatia) P Martić	6	6
Q	(Japan) R Saigo	1	1
WC	(Japan) M Hontama	0	3
(China) S Zhang	6	6

Second round
L Samsonova	7^{7}	6
(China) Xin Wang	6^{5}	3
Q	(Greece) D Papamichail	4	2
3	(Spain) G Muguruza	6	6
6	(Czech Republic) Ka Plíšková	3	4
(Croatia) P Martić	6	6
(China) S Zhang	4	7^{7}	7^{7}
2	(France) C Garcia	6	6^{5}	6^{5}

Quarterfinals
L Samsonova	6	6
3	(Spain) G Muguruza	4	2
(Croatia) P Martić	5	2
(China) S Zhang	7	6

Semifinals
L Samsonova	7^{7}	6
(China) S Zhang	6^{4}	2

== Qualifying ==
=== Seeds ===
1. (Poland) Katarzyna Kawa (first round)
2. (Mexico) Fernanda Contreras Gómez (qualified)
3. (Canada) Carol Zhao (qualifying competition)
4. (Greece) Despina Papamichail (qualified)
5. (Bulgaria) Isabella Shinikova (qualified)
6. (United States) Danielle Lao (qualifying competition)
7. (Japan) Kurumi Nara (qualifying competition)
8. (United States) Sophie Chang (first round)
9. (Japan) Kyōka Okamura (qualifying competition)
10. (China) You Xiaodi (qualified)
11. (Australia) Ellen Perez (qualified)
12. (Japan) Himeno Sakatsume (qualifying competition)

=== Qualifiers ===
1. (Japan) Rina Saigo
2. (Mexico) Fernanda Contreras Gómez
3. (China) You Xiaodi
4. (Greece) Despina Papamichail
5. (Bulgaria) Isabella Shinikova
6. (Australia) Ellen Perez

=== Qualifying draw ===
==== First qualifier ====
First round
1	(Poland) Katarzyna Kawa	6	5	4
(Japan) Chihiro Muramatsu	2	7	6
WC	(Japan) Rina Saigo	6	6
8	(United States) Sophie Chang	4	0

Qualifying competition
(Japan) Chihiro Muramatsu	6	3	0
WC	(Japan) Rina Saigo	2	6	6

==== Second qualifier ====
First round
2	(Mexico) Fernanda Contreras Gómez	6	6^{3}	6
(Japan) Nagi Hanatani	3	7^{7}	1
(Japan) Ena Shibahara	1	5
9	(Japan) Kyōka Okamura	6	7

Qualifying competition
2	(Mexico) Fernanda Contreras Gómez	6	2	6
9	(Japan) Kyōka Okamura	2	6	2

==== Third qualifier ====
First round
3	(Canada) Carol Zhao	6	6
(Mexico) Giuliana Olmos	4	2
(Japan) Haruna Arakawa	6	1	0
10	(China) You Xiaodi	3	6	6

Qualifying competition
3	(Canada) Carol Zhao	1	5
10	(China) You Xiaodi	6	7

==== Fourth qualifier ====
First round
4	(Greece) Despina Papamichail	6	4	6
(Japan) Erika Sema	4	6	4
WC	(Japan) Rinko Matsuda	4	2
12	(Japan) Himeno Sakatsume	6	6

Qualifying competition
4	(Greece) Despina Papamichail	6	6
12	(Japan) Himeno Sakatsume	2	4

==== Fifth qualifier ====
First round
5	(Bulgaria) Isabella Shinikova	7^{7}	7
(United States) Desirae Krawczyk	6^{4}	5
(United States) Nicole Melichar-Martinez	0	3
7	(Japan) Kurumi Nara	6	6

Qualifying competition
5	(Bulgaria) Isabella Shinikova	0	7	6
7	(Japan) Kurumi Nara	6	5	0

==== Sixth qualifier ====
First round
6	(United States) Danielle Lao	6	6
WC	(Japan) Eri Hozumi	4	3
WC	(Japan) Sayaka Ishii	3	3
11	(Australia) Ellen Perez	6	6

Qualifying competition
6	(United States) Danielle Lao	5	2
11	(Australia) Ellen Perez	7	6
