= 1995 Dubai Tennis Championships – Singles =

Singles
- 1995 Dubai Tennis Championships

Final
- Champion: (South Africa) Wayne Ferreira
- Runner-up: (Italy) Andrea Gaudenzi
- Score: 6–3, 6–3

Details
- Draw: 32
- Seeds: 8

Events
| Singles | Doubles |
| ← 1994 · | Dubai Tennis Championships | · 1996 → |

Magnus Gustafsson was the defending champion, but did not participate this year.

Wayne Ferreira won the tournament, beating Andrea Gaudenzi in the final, 6–3, 6–3.

== Seeds ==
1. (Spain) Sergi Bruguera (second round, withdrew)
2. (Croatia) Goran Ivanišević (first round)
3. (Spain) Alberto Berasategui (second round)
4. (South Africa) Wayne Ferreira (champion)
5. (Austria) Thomas Muster (first round)
6. (Czech Republic) Petr Korda (semifinals)
7. (Australia) Jason Stoltenberg (second round, retired)
8. (Spain) Àlex Corretja (first round)

== Draw ==
=== Key ===
- Q = Qualifier
- WC = Wild card
- LL = Lucky loser
- Alt = Alternate
- ITF = ITF entry
- PR = Protected ranking
- SR = Special ranking
- SE = Special exempt
- JE = Junior exempt
- JR = Junior Accelerator Programme entrant
- CO = College Accelerator Programme entrant
- NG = Next Gen Accelerator Program entrant
- w/o = Walkover
- r = Retired
- d = Defaulted

=== Finals ===
Semifinals
(Spain) Javier Sánchez | 7 | 1 | 4
4 | (South Africa) Wayne Ferreira | 5 | 6 | 6
6 | (Czech Republic) Petr Korda | 6 | 6^{3} | 4
(Italy) A Gaudenzi | 3 | 7^{7} | 6

Final
4 | (South Africa) Wayne Ferreira | 6 | 6
(Italy) A Gaudenzi | 3 | 3

=== Top half ===
First round
1 | (Spain) S Bruguera | 6 | 6
(Spain) O Martinez | 4 | 1
(Australia) R Fromberg | 2 | 4
(Spain) J Sánchez | 6 | 6
(Australia) T Woodbridge | 6 | 6
(Spain) T Carbonell | 3 | 2
(Germany) M Zoecke | 3 | 1
7 | (Australia) J Stoltenberg | 6 | 6
4 | (South Africa) W Ferreira | 6 | 6
Q | (Australia) J Fitzgerald | 4 | 1
LL | (United States) K Kinnear | 7^{7} | 7^{7}
(Russia) A Volkov | 6^{3} | 6^{1}
(United States) V Spadea | 2 | 3
(Spain) A Costa | 6 | 6
WC | (Australia) P Cash | 2 | 6 | 6
5 | (Austria) T Muster | 6 | 4 | 4

Second round
1 | (Spain) S Bruguera
(Spain) J Sánchez | w/o
(Australia) T Woodbridge | 6 | 2
7 | (Australia) J Stoltenberg | 3 | 1^{r}
4 | (South Africa) W Ferreira | 6 | 7^{7}
LL | (United States) K Kinnear | 1 | 6^{4}
(Spain) A Costa | 3 | 6 | 3
WC | (Australia) P Cash | 6 | 4 | 6

Quarterfinals
(Spain) J Sánchez | 6 | 6
(Australia) T Woodbridge | 2 | 4
4 | (South Africa) W Ferreira | 6 | 6
WC | (Australia) P Cash | 1 | 2

Semifinals
(Spain) J Sánchez | 7 | 1 | 4
4 | (South Africa) W Ferreira | 5 | 6 | 6

=== Bottom half ===
First round
6 | (Czech Republic) P Korda | 6 | 6
Q | (Germany) O Gross | 1 | 2
LL | (Spain) F Roig | 6 | 2 | 4
(Spain) C Costa | 3 | 6 | 6
LL | (Germany) C Arriens | 6 | 6
(United Kingdom) J Bates | 3 | 4
Q | (United Kingdom) D Sapsford | 1 | 2
3 | (Spain) A Berasategui | 6 | 6
8 | (Spain) À Corretja | 6 | 2 | 5
(Sweden) H Holm | 4 | 6 | 7
(Czech Republic) K Nováček | 6^{4} | 7^{7} | 2
Q | (Morocco) H Arazi | 7^{7} | 6^{1} | 6
(Germany) K Braasch | 7^{8} | 5 | r
(Spain) F Clavet | 6^{6} | 7
(Italy) A Gaudenzi | 3 | 6 | 6
2 | (Croatia) G Ivanišević | 6 | 3 | 3

Second round
6 | (Czech Republic) P Korda | 6 | 6^{5} | 6
(Spain) C Costa | 4 | 7^{7} | 1
LL | (Germany) C Arriens | 6 | 6
3 | (Spain) A Berasategui | 4 | 4
(Sweden) H Holm | 6 | 6
Q | (Morocco) H Arazi | 3 | 2
(Spain) F Clavet | 6^{5} | 6 | 2
(Italy) A Gaudenzi | 7^{7} | 1 | 6

Quarterfinals
6 | (Czech Republic) P Korda | 4 | 6 | 6
LL | (Germany) C Arriens | 6 | 2 | 4
(Sweden) H Holm | 4 | 2
(Italy) A Gaudenzi | 6 | 6

Semifinals
6 | (Czech Republic) P Korda | 6 | 6^{3} | 4
(Italy) A Gaudenzi | 3 | 7^{7} | 6
