= 1993 Dubai Tennis Championships =

- Date: 1–7 February
- Edition: 1st
- Category: World Series
- Draw: 32S / 16D
- Prize money: $1,000,250
- Surface: Hard / outdoor
- Location: Dubai, United Arab Emirates

Champions

Singles
- (Czech Republic) Karel Nováček

Doubles
- (Canada) John Fitzgerald / (Sweden) Anders Järryd
- Dubai Tennis Championships

The 1993 Dubai Tennis Championships, also known by its sponsored name Duty Free Dubai / BMW Tennis Open, was the inaugural edition of this men's tennis tournament and was played on outdoor hard courts. The tournament was part of the World Series of the 1993 ATP Tour. It took place in Dubai, United Arab Emirates from 1 February through 7 February 1993. Third-seeded Karel Nováček won the singles title.

== Finals ==
=== Singles ===
(Czech Republic) Karel Nováček defeated (France) Fabrice Santoro 6–4, 7–5

- It was Nováček's first singles title of the year and the 11th of his career.

=== Doubles ===
(Australia) John Fitzgerald / (Sweden) Anders Järryd defeated (Canada) Grant Connell / (United States) Patrick Galbraith 6–2, 6–1
