= 1995 Dubai Tennis Championships – Doubles =

Doubles
- 1995 Dubai Tennis Championships

Final
- Champions: (Canada) Grant Connell (United States) Patrick Galbraith
- Runners-up: (Spain) Tomás Carbonell (Spain) Francisco Roig
- Score: 6–2, 4–6, 6–3

Details
- Draw: 16 (2WC)/1Q)
- Seeds: 4

Events
Singles	Doubles
← 1994 ·	Dubai Tennis Championships	· 1996 →

Todd Woodbridge and Mark Woodforde were the defending champions, but did not compete this year.

Grant Connell and Patrick Galbraith won the title by defeating Tomás Carbonell and Francisco Roig 6–2, 4–6, 6–3 in the final.

== Seeds ==
1. (n/a)
2. (Canada) Grant Connell / (United States) Patrick Galbraith (champions)
3. (Sweden) Henrik Holm / (Spain) Javier Sánchez (first round)
4. (Netherlands) Hendrik Jan Davids / (Czech Republic) Cyril Suk (quarterfinals)

== Draw ==
=== Key ===
- Q = Qualifier
- WC = Wild card
- LL = Lucky loser
- Alt = Alternate
- ITF = ITF entry
- PR = Protected ranking
- SR = Special ranking
- SE = Special exempt
- JE = Junior exempt
- JR = Junior Accelerator Programme entrant
- CO = College Accelerator Programme entrant
- NG = Next Gen Accelerator Program entrant
- w/o = Walkover
- r = Retired
- d = Defaulted

=== Draw ===
First round
Q	(South Africa) M Barnard (Italy) L Tieleman	2	6
WC	(Italy) A Gaudenzi (Croatia) G Ivanišević	6	7
(South Africa) W Ferreira (Zimbabwe) K Ullyett	6	7
(Spain) F Clavet (Spain) À Corretja	3	6
4	(Netherlands) HJ Davids (Czech Republic) C Suk	2	6	7
(Czech Republic) P Korda (Czech Republic) K Nováček	6	2	6
(South Africa) L Bale (South Africa) JL de Jager	3	3
(Spain) T Carbonell (Spain) F Roig	6	6
(Australia) J Eagle (Australia) A Florent	6	3	6
(United States) M Keil (Sweden) P Nyborg	4	6	3
WC	(Australia) P Cash (Australia) J Fitzgerald	7	6
3	(Sweden) H Holm (Spain) J Sánchez	5	3
(United States) K Kinnear (United States) F Montana	7	3	6
(United States) S Cannon (United States) B Pearce	5	6	3
(Sweden) T Nydahl (United Kingdom) D Sapsford	3	1
2	(Canada) G Connell (United States) P Galbraith	6	6

Quarterfinals
WC	(Italy) A Gaudenzi (Croatia) G Ivanišević	1	r
(South Africa) W Ferreira (Zimbabwe) K Ullyett	1
4	(Netherlands) HJ Davids (Czech Republic) C Suk	3	6
(Spain) T Carbonell (Spain) F Roig	6	7
(Australia) J Eagle (Australia) A Florent	3	3
WC	(Australia) P Cash (Australia) J Fitzgerald	6	6
(United States) K Kinnear (United States) F Montana	3	7	1
2	(Canada) G Connell (United States) P Galbraith	6	6	6

Semifinals
(South Africa) W Ferreira (Zimbabwe) K Ullyett	6	3	3
(Spain) T Carbonell (Spain) F Roig	4	6	6
WC	(Australia) P Cash (Australia) J Fitzgerald	3	4
2	(Canada) G Connell (United States) P Galbraith	6	6

Final
(Spain) T Carbonell (Spain) F Roig	2	6	3
2	(Canada) G Connell (United States) P Galbraith	6	4	6
