= 1994 Dubai Open =

1994 Dubai Tennis Championships
- Date: 31 January – 7 February
- Edition: 2nd
- Category: World Series
- Draw: 32S / 16D
- Prize money: $1,013,750
- Surface: Hard / outdoor
- Location: Dubai, United Arab Emirates

Champions

Singles
- (Sweden) Magnus Gustafsson

Doubles
- (Australia) Todd Woodbridge / (Australia) Mark Woodforde
- Dubai Tennis Championships

The 1994 Dubai Open was the second edition of this men's tennis tournament and was played on outdoor hard courts. The tournament was part of the World Series of the 1994 ATP Tour. It took place in Dubai, United Arab Emirates from 31 January through 7 February 1994. Fourth-seeded Magnus Gustafsson won the singles title.

== Finals ==
=== Singles ===
(Sweden) Magnus Gustafsson defeated (Spain) Sergi Bruguera, 6–4, 6–2

- It was Gustafsson's 2nd singles title of the year and the 7th of his career.

=== Doubles ===
(Australia) Todd Woodbridge / (Australia) Mark Woodforde defeated (Australia) Darren Cahill / (Australia) John Fitzgerald, 6–7, 6–4, 6–2
