= 1995 Dubai Tennis Championships =

- Date: 6–13 February
- Edition: 3rd
- Category: World Series
- Draw: 32S / 16D
- Prize money: $1,014,250
- Surface: Hard / outdoor
- Location: Dubai, United Arab Emirates

Champions

Singles
- (South Africa) Wayne Ferreira

Doubles
- (Canada) Grant Connell / (United States) Patrick Galbraith
- Dubai Tennis Championships

The 1995 Dubai Tennis Championships was the third edition of this men's tennis tournament and was played on outdoor hard courts. The tournament was part of the World Series of the 1995 ATP Tour. It took place in Dubai, United Arab Emirates from 6 February through 13 February 1995. Fourth-seeded Wayne Ferreira won the singles title.

== Finals ==
=== Singles ===
(South Africa) Wayne Ferreira defeated (Italy) Andrea Gaudenzi, 6–3, 6–3

- It was Ferreira's first title of the year and the eighth of his career.

=== Doubles ===
(Canada) Grant Connell / (United States) Patrick Galbraith defeated (Spain) Tomás Carbonell / (Spain) Francisco Roig, 6–2, 4–6, 6–3
