= 2013 Dubai Tennis Championships =

- Date: 25 February – 3 March (men); 18 – 24 February (women)
- Edition: 21st (men) / 13th (women)
- Category: ATP World Tour 500; WTA Premier event
- Draw: 32S / 16D; 28S / 16D
- Prize money: $2,413,300 $2,000,000
- Surface: Hard
- Location: Dubai, United Arab Emirates
- Venue: Aviation Club Tennis Centre

Champions

Men's singles
- (Serbia) Novak Djokovic

Women's singles
- (Czech Republic) Petra Kvitová

Men's doubles
- (India) Mahesh Bhupathi / (France) Michaël Llodra

Women's doubles
- (United States) Bethanie Mattek-Sands / (India) Sania Mirza
- Dubai Tennis Championships

The 2013 Dubai Tennis Championships (also known as the 2013 Dubai Duty Free Tennis Championships for sponsorship reasons) was a 500 event on the 2013 ATP World Tour and a Premier event on the 2013 WTA Tour. Both of the events took place at the Aviation Club Tennis Centre in Dubai, United Arab Emirates. The women's tournament took place February 18 to 23, while the men's tournament took place from February 25 to March 2.

== Finals ==
=== Men's singles ===
- (Serbia) Novak Djokovic defeated (Czech Republic) Tomáš Berdych 7–5, 6–3

=== Women's singles ===
- (Czech Republic) Petra Kvitová defeated (Italy) Sara Errani, 6–2, 1–6, 6–1

=== Men's doubles ===
- (India) Mahesh Bhupathi / (France) Michaël Llodra defeated (Sweden) Robert Lindstedt / (Serbia) Nenad Zimonjić, 7–6^{(8–6)}, 7–6^{(8–6)}

=== Women's doubles ===
- (United States) Bethanie Mattek-Sands / (India) Sania Mirza defeated (Russia) Nadia Petrova / (Slovenia) Katarina Srebotnik, 6–4, 2–6, [10–7]

== Points and prize money ==
=== Point distribution ===
Event	W	F	SF	QF	Round of 16	Round of 32	Q	Q3	Q2	Q1
Men's singles	500	300	180	90	45	0	20	10	0	—N/a
Men's doubles	500	300	180	90	0	—N/a	—N/a	—N/a	—N/a	—N/a
Women's singles	470	320	200	120	60	1	20	12	8	1
Women's doubles	470	320	200	120	1	—N/a	—N/a	—N/a	—N/a	—N/a

=== Prize money ===
Event	W	F	SF	QF	Round of 16	Round of 32	Q3	Q2	Q1
Men's singles	$429,600	$193,700	$91,750	$44,275	$22,575	$12,415	$1,400	$770	—N/a
Men's doubles *	$126,900	$57,300	$27,000	$13,050	$6,700	—N/a	—N/a	—N/a	—N/a
Women's singles	$442,198	$240,644	$128,910	$33,225	$18,382	$10,183	$5,005	$2,727	$1,726
Women's doubles *	$69,039	$36,376	$18,640	$9,320	$4,850	—N/a	—N/a	—N/a	—N/a

_{* per team}

== ATP singles main-draw entrants ==
=== Seeds ===
Country	Player	Rank^{1}	Seed
SRB	Novak Djokovic	1	1
SUI	Roger Federer	2	2
CZE	Tomáš Berdych	6	3
ARG	Juan Martín del Potro	7	4
FRA	Jo-Wilfried Tsonga	8	5
SRB	Janko Tipsarević	9	6
ITA	Andreas Seppi	19	7
RUS	Mikhail Youzhny	32	8

- Rankings are as of February 18, 2013.

=== Other entrants ===
The following players received wildcards into the singles main draw:

- (Tunisia) Malek Jaziri
- (United States) Rajeev Ram
- (Russia) Dmitry Tursunov

The following players received entry from the qualifying draw:

- (Germany) Daniel Brands
- (Russia) Igor Kunitsyn
- (France) Florent Serra
- (Italy) Matteo Viola

=== Withdrawals ===
Before the tournament

- (Germany) Philipp Kohlschreiber
- (Czech Republic) Radek Štěpánek

=== Retirements ===
- (Australia) Bernard Tomic (illness)

== ATP doubles main-draw entrants ==
=== Seeds ===
Country	Player	Country	Player	Rank^{1}	Seed
ESP	Marc López	ESP	Marcel Granollers	8	1
PAK	Aisam-ul-Haq Qureshi	NED	Jean-Julien Rojer	27	2
SWE	Robert Lindstedt	SRB	Nenad Zimonjić	29	3
POL	Mariusz Fyrstenberg	POL	Marcin Matkowski	35	4

- Rankings are as of February 18, 2013.

=== Other entrants ===
The following pairs received wildcards into the doubles main draw:

- (United Arab Emirates) Omar Awadhy / (United Arab Emirates) Hamad Abbas Janahi
- (Serbia) Novak Djokovic / (Serbia) Marko Djokovic

== WTA singles main-draw entrants ==
=== Seeds ===
Country	Player	Rank^{1}	Seed
~~BLR~~	~~Victoria Azarenka~~	~~1~~	~~1~~
USA	Serena Williams	2	2
POL	Agnieszka Radwańska	4	3
GER	Angelique Kerber	6	4
ITA	Sara Errani	7	5
CZE	Petra Kvitová	8	6
AUS	Samantha Stosur	9	7
DEN	Caroline Wozniacki	10	8

- Rankings are as of February 11, 2013.

=== Other entrants ===
The following players received wildcards into the singles main draw:

- (France) Marion Bartoli
- (Kazakhstan) Yulia Putintseva
- (United Kingdom) Laura Robson

The following players received entry from the qualifying draw:

- (Slovakia) Daniela Hantuchová
- (Russia) Svetlana Kuznetsova
- (Poland) Urszula Radwańska
- (China) Zheng Jie

The following player received entry as lucky loser:

- (Spain) Carla Suárez Navarro

=== Withdrawals ===
Before the tournament

- (Belarus) Victoria Azarenka (right foot injury)
- (Russia) Maria Kirilenko (shoulder injury)
- (China) Li Na (left ankle injury)
- (United States) Serena Williams (lower back injury)

== WTA doubles main-draw entrants ==
=== Seeds ===
Country	Player	Country	Player	Rank^{1}	Seed
~~RUS~~	~~Ekaterina Makarova~~	~~RUS~~	~~Elena Vesnina~~	~~19~~	~~1~~
RUS	Nadia Petrova	SLO	Katarina Srebotnik	20	2
USA	Raquel Kops-Jones	USA	Abigail Spears	27	3
ESP	Nuria Llagostera Vives	CHN	Zheng Jie	29	4
TPE	Hsieh Su-wei	USA	Liezel Huber	32	5

- Rankings are as of February 11, 2013.

=== Other entrants ===
The following pairs received wildcards into the doubles main draw:

- (Oman) Fatma Al-Nabhani / (Poland) Alicja Rosolska
- (Germany) Julia Görges / (Germany) Angelique Kerber
- (United States) Lisa Raymond / (Australia) Samantha Stosur

The following pair received entry as alternates:

- (Russia) Vera Dushevina / (Czech Republic) Klára Zakopalová

=== Withdrawals ===
Before the tournament

- (Russia) Elena Vesnina (viral illness)

=== Retirements ===
- (Czech Republic) Květa Peschke (left thigh strain)
