= 1993 Dubai Tennis Championships – Singles =

Singles
- 1993 Dubai Tennis Championships

Final
- Champion: (Czech Republic) Karel Nováček
- Runner-up: (France) Fabrice Santoro
- Score: 6–4, 7–5

Details
- Draw: 32 (3WC/4Q)
- Seeds: 8

Events
Singles	Doubles
Dubai Tennis Championships	· 1994 →

In the first edition of the tournament, Karel Nováček won the title by defeating Fabrice Santoro 6–4, 7–5 in the final.

== Seeds ==
1. (Russia) Alexander Volkov (quarterfinals)
2. (Austria) Thomas Muster (semifinals)
3. (Czechoslovakia) Karel Nováček (champion)
4. (Germany) Carl-Uwe Steeb (quarterfinals)
5. (Spain) Emilio Sánchez (first round)
6. (Russia) Andrei Cherkasov (quarterfinals)
7. (Spain) Javier Sánchez (second round)
8. (France) Fabrice Santoro (final)

== Draw ==
=== Key ===
- Q = Qualifier
- WC = Wild card
- LL = Lucky loser
- Alt = Alternate
- ITF = ITF entry
- PR = Protected ranking
- SR = Special ranking
- SE = Special exempt
- JE = Junior exempt
- JR = Junior Accelerator Programme entrant
- CO = College Accelerator Programme entrant
- NG = Next Gen Accelerator Program entrant
- w/o = Walkover
- r = Retired
- d = Defaulted

=== Finals ===
Semifinals
8/WC	(France) Fabrice Santoro	6	6
(United Kingdom) Jeremy Bates	2	3
3	(Czech Republic) Karel Nováček	7	6
2	(Austria) Thomas Muster	5	4

Final
8/WC	(France) Fabrice Santoro	4	5
3	(Czech Republic) Karel Nováček	6	7

=== Top half ===
First round
1	(Russia) A Volkov	6	6
Q	(Morocco) Y El Aynaoui	2	3
(Italy) C Pistolesi	1	0^{r}
(Sweden) L Jönsson	6	1
(Belgium) B Wuyts	4	2
(Germany) K Braasch	6	6
(United States) F Montana	5	0
8/WC	(France) F Santoro	7	6
4	(Germany) CU Steeb	7	4	6
(Germany) B Karbacher	5	6	3
(United States) T Witsken	6	6^{5}	2
(Switzerland) C Mezzadri	3	7^{7}	6
(United Kingdom) J Bates	7^{7}	6
(Sweden) C Bergström	6^{4}	1
(Portugal) J Cunha e Silva	6	4	6
5	(Spain) E Sánchez	3	6	4

Second round
1	(Russia) A Volkov	7	6
(Sweden) L Jönsson	5	1
(Germany) K Braasch	2	1
8/WC	(France) F Santoro	6	6
4	(Germany) CU Steeb	7	6
(Switzerland) C Mezzadri	5	3
(United Kingdom) J Bates	3	6	6
(Portugal) J Cunha e Silva	6	3	3

Quarterfinals
1	(Russia) A Volkov	6	4	4
8/WC	(France) F Santoro	2	6	6
4	(Germany) CU Steeb	5	1
(United Kingdom) J Bates	7	6

Semifinals
8/WC	(France) F Santoro	6	6
(United Kingdom) J Bates	2	3

=== Bottom half ===
First round
6/WC	(Russia) A Cherkasov	4	7^{7}	6
(Netherlands) M Schapers	6	6^{5}	2
(Sweden) M Gustafsson	7	4	5
(Spain) T Carbonell	5	6	7
(Russia) A Olhovskiy	3	6	3
Q	(Sweden) LA Wahlgren	6	3	6
(Czech Republic) D Vacek	0	5
3	(Czech Republic) K Nováček	6	7
7	(Spain) J Sánchez	7^{7}	6
WC	(Sweden) A Järryd	6^{5}	3
Q	(Czech Republic) S Doseděl	6	7
(Austria) G Schaller	3	5
(Spain) M Górriz	7	3	7
Q	(Zimbabwe) B Black	5	6	5
(Venezuela) N Pereira	4	2
2	(Austria) T Muster	6	6

Second round
6/WC	(Russia) A Cherkasov	7^{7}	6
(Spain) T Carbonell	6^{5}	4
Q	(Sweden) LA Wahlgren	2	6	1
3	(Czech Republic) K Nováček	6	3	6
7	(Spain) J Sánchez	3	2
Q	(Czech Republic) S Doseděl	6	6
(Spain) M Górriz	6	1	3
2	(Austria) T Muster	4	6	6

Quarterfinals
6/WC	(Russia) A Cherkasov	2	7	5
3	(Czech Republic) K Nováček	6	5	7
Q	(Czech Republic) S Doseděl	0	3
2	(Austria) T Muster	6	6

Semifinals
3	(Czech Republic) K Nováček	7	6
2	(Austria) T Muster	5	4
