= 1996 Dubai Tennis Championships =

- Date: 12–18 February
- Edition: 4th
- Category: World Series
- Draw: 32S / 16D
- Prize money: $1,014,250
- Surface: Hard / outdoor
- Location: Dubai, United Arab Emirates
- Venue: Aviation Club Tennis Centre

Champions

Singles
- (Croatia) Goran Ivanišević

Doubles
- (Zimbabwe) Byron Black / (Canada) Grant Connell
- Dubai Tennis Championships

The 1996 Dubai Tennis Championships was a men's tennis tournament played on outdoor hard courts at the Aviation Club Tennis Centre in Dubai in the United Arab Emirates and was part of the World Series of the 1996 ATP Tour. The tournament ran from 12 February through 18 February 1996. Fourth-seeded Goran Ivanišević won the singles title.

== Finals ==
=== Singles ===
(Croatia) Goran Ivanišević defeated (Spain) Albert Costa 6–4, 6–3

- It was Ivanišević's 2nd title of the year and the 20th of his career.

=== Doubles ===
(Zimbabwe) Byron Black / (Canada) Grant Connell defeated (Czech Republic) Karel Nováček / (Czech Republic) Jiří Novák 6–0, 6–1

- It was Black's 1st title of the year and the 12th of his career. It was Connell's 1st title of the year and the 18th of his career.
