= 2014 Dubai Tennis Championships =

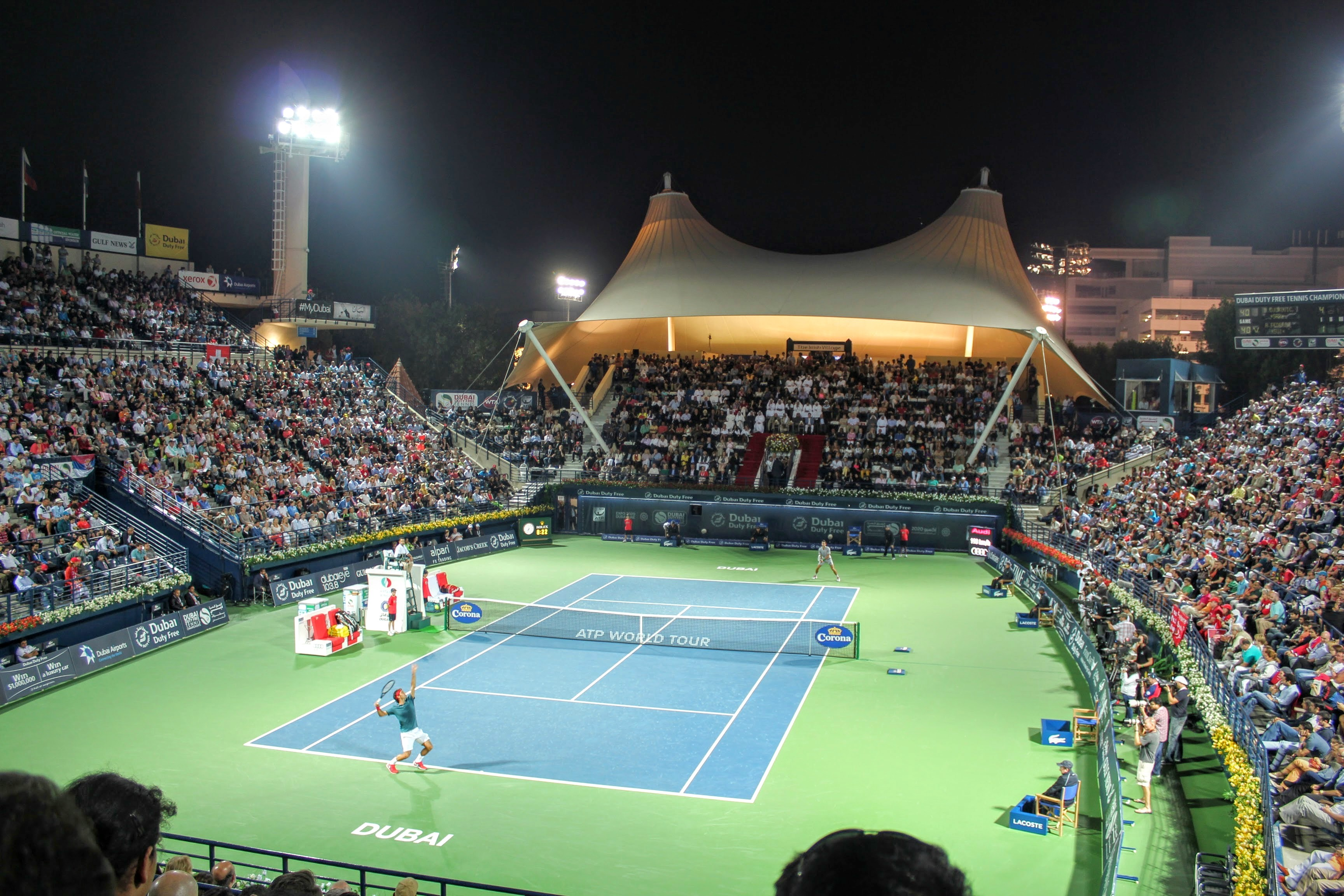
- Date: 24 February – 1 March (men); 17 – 22 February (women)
- Edition: 22nd (men) / 14th (women)
- Category: ATP World Tour 500; WTA Premier event
- Draw: 32S / 16D; 28S / 16D
- Prize money: $1,928,340 (ATP) $2,000,000 (WTA)
- Surface: Hard
- Location: Dubai, United Arab Emirates
- Venue: Aviation Club Tennis Centre

Champions

Men's singles
- (Switzerland) Roger Federer

Women's singles
- (United States) Venus Williams

Men's doubles
- (India) Rohan Bopanna / (Pakistan) Aisam-ul-Haq Qureshi

Women's doubles
- (Russia) Alla Kudryavtseva / (Australia) Anastasia Rodionova
- Dubai Tennis Championships

The 2014 Dubai Tennis Championships (also known as the 2014 Dubai Duty Free Tennis Championships for sponsorship reasons) was a 500 event on the 2014 ATP World Tour and a Premier event on the 2014 WTA Tour. Both of the events took place at the Aviation Club Tennis Centre in Dubai, United Arab Emirates. The women's tournament took place 17 February until 22 February 2014, while the men's tournament took place from 24 February until 1 March 2014. Roger Federer and Venus Williams won the singles titles.

== Finals ==
=== Men's singles ===
- (Switzerland) Roger Federer defeated (Czech Republic) Tomáš Berdych, 3–6, 6–4, 6–3

=== Women's singles ===
- (United States) Venus Williams defeated (France) Alizé Cornet, 6–3, 6–0

=== Men's doubles ===
- (India) Rohan Bopanna / (Pakistan) Aisam-ul-Haq Qureshi defeated (Canada) Daniel Nestor / (Serbia) Nenad Zimonjić, 6–4, 6–3

=== Women's doubles ===
- (Russia) Alla Kudryavtseva / (Australia) Anastasia Rodionova defeated (United States) Raquel Kops-Jones / (United States) Abigail Spears, 6–2, 5–7, [10–8]

== Points and prize money ==
=== Point distribution ===
Event	W	F	SF	QF	Round of 16	Round of 32	Q	Q3	Q2	Q1
Men's singles	500	300	180	90	45	0	20	10	0	—N/a
Men's doubles	500	300	180	90	—N/a	0	20	0	0	—N/a
Women's singles	470	305	185	100	55	1	25	18	13	1
Women's doubles	470	305	185	100	1	—N/a	—N/a	—N/a	—N/a	—N/a

=== Prize money ===
Event	W	F	SF	QF	Round of 16	Round of 32	Q3	Q2	Q1
Men's singles	$465,830	$210,020	$99,480	$48,005	$24,475	$13,460	$1,515	$835	—N/a
Men's doubles	$137,620	$62,090	$29,280	$14,150	$7,270	—N/a	—N/a	—N/a	—N/a
Women's singles	$471,841	$251,648	$135,064	$34,891	$18,712	$11,888	$5,387	$2,835	$1,607
Women's doubles	$71,820	$37,801	$20,791	$10,584	$5,736	—N/a	—N/a	—N/a	—N/a
Doubles prize money per team

== ATP singles main-draw entrants ==
=== Seeds ===
Country	Player	Rank^{1}	Seed
SRB	Novak Djokovic	2	1
ARG	Juan Martín del Potro	5	2
CZE	Tomáš Berdych	6	3
SUI	Roger Federer	8	4
FRA	Jo-Wilfried Tsonga	10	5
RUS	Mikhail Youzhny	16	6
GER	Philipp Kohlschreiber	25	7
RUS	Dmitry Tursunov	28	8

- Rankings are as of February 17, 2014.

=== Other entrants ===
The following players received wildcards into the singles main draw:

- (India) Somdev Devvarman
- (Tunisia) Malek Jaziri
- (United Kingdom) James Ward

The following players received entry from the qualifying draw:

- (Romania) Marius Copil
- (Netherlands) Thiemo de Bakker
- (Slovakia) Lukáš Lacko
- (Romania) Adrian Ungur

=== Retirements ===
- (Argentina) Juan Martín del Potro (wrist injury)

=== Withdrawals ===
During the tournament

- (Russia) Nikolay Davydenko (left rib injury)
- (Russia) Mikhail Youzhny (illness)

== ATP doubles main-draw entrants ==
=== Seeds ===
Country	Player	Country	Player	Rank^{1}	Seed
CAN	Daniel Nestor	SRB	Nenad Zimonjić	30	1
IND	Rohan Bopanna	PAK	Aisam-ul-Haq Qureshi	36	2
POL	Mariusz Fyrstenberg	POL	Marcin Matkowski	42	3
CRO	Ivan Dodig	RUS	Mikhail Youzhny	69	4

- Rankings are as of February 17, 2014.

=== Other entrants ===
The following pairs received wildcards into the doubles main draw:

- (United Arab Emirates) Omar Alawadhi / (United Arab Emirates) Hamad Abbas Janahi
- (Serbia) Novak Djokovic / (Spain) Carlos Gómez-Herrera

The following pair received entry from the qualifying draw:

- (Russia) Nikolay Davydenko / (Romania) Victor Hănescu

=== Withdrawals ===
During the tournament

- (Argentina) Juan Martín del Potro (wrist injury)

== WTA singles main-draw entrants ==
=== Seeds ===
Country	Player	Rank^{1}	Seed
USA	Serena Williams	1	1
POL	Agnieszka Radwańska	4	2
CZE	Petra Kvitová	6	3
ITA	Sara Errani	7	4
SRB	Jelena Janković	8	5
GER	Angelique Kerber	9	6
ROU	Simona Halep	10	7
DEN	Caroline Wozniacki	11	8

- Rankings are as of February 10, 2014.

=== Other entrants ===
The following players received wildcards into the singles main draw:

- (Russia) Nadia Petrova
- (United States) Serena Williams
- (United States) Venus Williams

The following players received entry from the qualifying draw:

- (Germany) Annika Beck
- (Italy) Flavia Pennetta
- (Czech Republic) Karolína Plíšková
- (Ukraine) Maryna Zanevska

=== Withdrawals ===
Before the tournament

- (Russia) Svetlana Kuznetsova → replaced by Alizé Cornet

=== Retirements ===
- (Romania) Simona Halep (right ankle injury)

== WTA doubles main-draw entrants ==
=== Seeds ===
Country	Player	Country	Player	Rank^{1}	Seed
ITA	Sara Errani	ITA	Roberta Vinci	2	1
RUS	Ekaterina Makarova	RUS	Elena Vesnina	12	2
CZE	Květa Peschke	SLO	Katarina Srebotnik	17	3
ZIM	Cara Black	IND	Sania Mirza	22	4

- Rankings are as of February 10, 2014.

=== Other entrants ===
The following pairs received wildcards into the doubles main draw:

- (Belgium) Kirsten Flipkens / (Czech Republic) Petra Kvitová
- (Italy) Flavia Pennetta / (Australia) Samantha Stosur
- (United States) Serena Williams / (United States) Venus Williams

=== Withdrawals ===
Before the tournament

- (Czech Republic) Kristýna Plíšková (visa issues)
