= 1996 Dubai Tennis Championships – Singles =

Singles
- 1996 Dubai Tennis Championships
- 1995 Champion: (South Africa) Wayne Ferreira

Final
- Champion: (Croatia) Goran Ivanišević
- Runner-up: (Spain) Albert Costa
- Score: 6–4, 6–3

Details
- Draw: 32
- Seeds: 8

Events
Singles	Doubles
← 1995 ·	Dubai Tennis Championships	· 1997 →

Wayne Ferreira was the defending champion and lost in the quarterfinals to Goran Ivanišević.

Ivanišević won in the final 6–4, 6–3 against Albert Costa.

== Seeds ==
A champion seed is indicated in bold text while text in italics indicates the round in which that seed was eliminated.

1. (Austria) Thomas Muster (first round)
2. (Sweden) Thomas Enqvist (quarterfinals)
3. (United States) Jim Courier (first round)
4. (Croatia) **Goran Ivanišević (champion)**
5. (South Africa) Wayne Ferreira (quarterfinals)
6. (Switzerland) Marc Rosset (first round)
7. (Ukraine) Andriy Medvedev (second round)
8. (Austria) Gilbert Schaller (first round)

== Draw ==
=== Key ===
- Q = Qualifier
- WC = Wild card
- LL = Lucky loser
- Alt = Alternate
- SE = Special exempt
- PR = Protected ranking
- ITF = ITF entry
- JE = Junior exempt
- w/o = Walkover
- r = Retired
- d = Defaulted
- SR = Special ranking

First round
1	(Austria) T Muster	1	**6**	6^{0}
LL	(Australia) **S Stolle**	**6**	3	**7^{7}**
Q	(Russia) **A Cherkasov**	5	**6**	**6**
Q	(Sweden) L Jonsson	**7**	3	4
(Czech Republic) J Novák	3	6^{1}
(Spain) **J Sánchez**	**6**	**7^{7}**
WC	(France) **F Santoro**	**6**	**6**
8	(Austria) G Schaller	3	1
3	(United States) J Courier	5	6^{5}
(Spain) **A Berasategui**	**7**	**7^{7}**
(Italy) S Pescosolido	1	6^{5}
Q	(Netherlands) **H J Davids**	**6**	**7^{7}**
(Germany) **B Karbacher**	**6**	**6**
Q	(Romania) D Pescariu	4	4
(Spain) **A Costa**	1	**6**	**6**
6	(Switzerland) M Rosset	**6**	3	4
5	(South Africa) **W Ferreira**	**6**
WC	(Morocco) Y El Aynaoui	1	r
(Italy) **A Gaudenzi**	**7^{7}**	**7^{7}**
(United States) P McEnroe	6^{3}	6^{2}
(Russia) A Volkov	2	4
WC	(Czech Republic) **K Nováček**	**6**	**6**
(Spain) J Burillo	3	4
4	(Croatia) **G Ivanišević**	**6**	**6**
7	(Ukraine) **A Medvedev**	**6**	**6**
(Zimbabwe) B Black	4	1
(Sweden) S Edberg	**7**	6^{5}	4
(Germany) **D Prinosil**	5	**7^{7}**	**6**
(Sweden) **M Larsson**	**6**	**6**
(Italy) R Furlan	2	4
(Sweden) M Gustafsson	1	4
2	(Sweden) **T Enqvist**	**6**	**6**

Second round
LL	(Australia) **S Stolle**	**6**	1	**6**
Q	(Russia) A Cherkasov	3	**6**	4
(Spain) **J Sánchez**	**6**	4	**7^{7}**
WC	(France) F Santoro	3	**6**	6^{5}
(Spain) A Berasategui	4	4
Q	(Netherlands) **H J Davids**	**6**	**6**
(Germany) B Karbacher	4	2
(Spain) **A Costa**	**6**	**6**
5	(South Africa) **W Ferreira**	**7^{8}**	6^{4}	**6**
(Italy) A Gaudenzi	6^{6}	**7^{7}**	4
WC	(Czech Republic) K Nováček	3	5
4	(Croatia) **G Ivanišević**	**6**	**7**
7	(Ukraine) A Medvedev	1	6^{5}
(Germany) **D Prinosil**	**6**	**7^{7}**
(Sweden) M Larsson	3	2
2	(Sweden) **T Enqvist**	**6**	**6**

Quarterfinals
LL	(Australia) S Stolle	**6**	5	4
(Spain) **J Sánchez**	2	**7**	**6**
Q	(Netherlands) H J Davids	3	**6**	2
(Spain) **A Costa**	**6**	2	**6**
5	(South Africa) W Ferreira	2	1
4	(Croatia) **G Ivanišević**	**6**	**6**
(Germany) **D Prinosil**	**6**	**6**
2	(Sweden) T Enqvist	2	3

Semifinals
(Spain) J Sánchez	**6**	3	1
(Spain) **A Costa**	3	**6**	**6**
4	(Croatia) **G Ivanišević**	**6**	**7^{8}**
(Germany) D Prinosil	2	6^{6}

Final
(Spain) Albert Costa	4	3
4	(Croatia) **Goran Ivanišević**	**6**	**6**
