= 2013 Dubai Tennis Championships – Women's doubles =

Women's doubles
- 2013 Dubai Tennis Championships

Final
- Champion: (United States) Bethanie Mattek-Sands (India) Sania Mirza
- Runner-up: (Russia) Nadia Petrova (Slovenia) Katarina Srebotnik
- Score: 6–4, 2–6, [10–7]

Events
Singles	men	women
Doubles	men	women
- Dubai Tennis Championships

Liezel Huber and Lisa Raymond were the defending champions but chose not to participate together. Huber played with Hsieh Su-wei, but lost in the first round to Bethanie Mattek-Sands and Sania Mirza. Raymond played alongside Samantha Stosur but lost in the quarterfinals to Cara Black and Anastasia Rodionova.
Mattek-Sands and Mirza won the title, defeating Nadia Petrova and Katarina Srebotnik in the final, 6–4, 2–6, [10–7].

== Seeds ==
1. (Russia) Ekaterina Makarova / (Russia) Elena Vesnina (withdrew because of a viral illness for Vesnina)
2. (Russia) Nadia Petrova / (Slovenia) Katarina Srebotnik (final)
3. (United States) Raquel Kops-Jones / (United States) Abigail Spears (first round)
4. (Spain) Nuria Llagostera Vives / (China) Zheng Jie (semifinals)
5. (Chinese Taipei) Hsieh Su-wei / (United States) Liezel Huber (first round)

== Draw ==
Key

- Q = Qualifier
- WC = Wild card
- LL = Lucky loser
- Alt = Alternate
- ITF = ITF entry
- PR = Protected ranking
- SR = Special ranking
- SE = Special exempt
- JE = Junior exempt
- JR = Junior Accelerator Programme entrant
- CO = College Accelerator Programme entrant
- NG = Next Gen Accelerator Program entrant
- w/o = Walkover
- r = Retired
- d = Defaulted

=== Draw ===
First round
5	(Chinese Taipei) S-w Hsieh (United States) L Huber	4	4
(United States) B Mattek-Sands (India) S Mirza	6	6
WC	(Oman) F Al-Nabhani (Poland) A Rosolska	0	4
(Russia) A Pavlyuchenkova (Czech Republic) L Šafářová	6	6
3	(United States) R Kops-Jones (United States) A Spears	2	4
(Zimbabwe) C Black (Australia) An Rodionova	6	6
(South Africa) N Grandin (Czech Republic) V Uhlířová	1	1
WC	(United States) L Raymond (Australia) S Stosur	6	6
(Croatia) D Jurak (Hungary) K Marosi	4	6	[10]
Alt	(Russia) V Dushevina (Czech Republic) K Zakopalová	6	4	[7]
(Slovakia) D Hantuchová (Spain) A Medina Garrigues	0	3
4	(Spain) N Llagostera Vives (China) J Zheng	6	6
WC	(Germany) J Görges (Germany) A Kerber	7^{11}	7
(Slovakia) J Husárová (China) S Zhang	6^{9}	5
(Germany) A-L Grönefeld (Czech Republic) K Peschke	0^{r}
2	(Russia) N Petrova (Slovenia) K Srebotnik	3

Quarterfinals
(United States) B Mattek-Sands (India) S Mirza	6	6
(Russia) A Pavlyuchenkova (Czech Republic) L Šafářová	4	4
(Zimbabwe) C Black (Australia) An Rodionova	6	6
WC	(United States) L Raymond (Australia) S Stosur	1	3
(Croatia) D Jurak (Hungary) K Marosi	3	4
4	(Spain) N Llagostera Vives (China) J Zheng	6	6
WC	(Germany) J Görges (Germany) A Kerber	7^{9}	6^{4}	[5]
2	(Russia) N Petrova (Slovenia) K Srebotnik	6^{7}	7^{7}	[10]

Semifinals
(United States) B Mattek-Sands (India) S Mirza	6	7
(Zimbabwe) C Black (Australia) A Rodionova	2	5
4	(Spain) N Llagostera Vives (China) J Zheng	1	0
2	(Russia) N Petrova (Slovenia) K Srebotnik	6	6

Final
(United States) B Mattek-Sands (India) S Mirza	6	2	[10]
2	(Russia) N Petrova (Slovenia) K Srebotnik	4	6	[7]
