= 2013 Dubai Tennis Championships – Men's doubles =

Tennis tournament

Men's doubles
- 2013 Dubai Tennis Championships

Final
- Champions: (India) Mahesh Bhupathi (France) Michaël Llodra
- Runners-up: (Sweden) Robert Lindstedt (Serbia) Nenad Zimonjić
- Score: 7–6^{(8–6)}, 7–6^{(8–6)}

Details
- Draw: 16
- Seeds: 4

Events
Singles	men	women
Doubles	men	women
← 2012 ·	Dubai Tennis Championships	· 2014 →

Mahesh Bhupathi and Rohan Bopanna were the defending champions but decided not to participate together.
Bopanna played alongside Rajeev Ram, while Bhupathi partnered up with Michaël Llodra. The two teams met in the semifinals, with Bhupathi and Llodra winning. Bhupathi and Llodra went on to win the title, defeating Robert Lindstedt and Nenad Zimonjić in the final, 7–6^{(8–6)}, 7–6^{(8–6)}.

== Seeds ==
1. (Spain) Marcel Granollers / (Spain) Marc López (quarterfinals)
2. (Pakistan) Aisam-ul-Haq Qureshi / (Netherlands) Jean-Julien Rojer (first round)
3. (Sweden) Robert Lindstedt / (Serbia) Nenad Zimonjić (final)
4. (Poland) Mariusz Fyrstenberg / (Poland) Marcin Matkowski (quarterfinals)

== Draw ==
=== Key ===
- Q = Qualifier
- WC = Wild card
- LL = Lucky loser
- Alt = Alternate
- SE = Special exempt
- PR = Protected ranking
- ITF = ITF entry
- JE = Junior exempt
- w/o = Walkover
- r = Retired
- d = Defaulted
- SR = Special ranking

=== Draw ===
First round
1	(Spain) M Granollers (Spain) M López	6	6
(Cyprus) M Baghdatis (Belgium) D Goffin	4	1
(Spain) R Bautista-Agut (Italy) A Seppi	4	5
(Israel) J Erlich (Russia) M Youzhny	6	7
3	(Sweden) R Lindstedt (Serbia) N Zimonjić	6	6
(United States) E Butorac (Australia) P Hanley	3	4
(Russia) N Davydenko (Belgium) D Norman	4	6	[10]
WC	(Serbia) N Djokovic (Serbia) M Djokovic	6	3	[4]
(India) M Bhupathi (France) M Llodra	6	6
(Serbia) J Tipsarević (Serbia) V Troicki	3	3
(Austria) J Knowle (Slovakia) F Polášek	3	2
4	(Poland) M Fyrstenberg (Poland) M Matkowski	6	6
(Romania) V Hănescu (Czech Republic) L Rosol	6	6
WC	(United Arab Emirates) O Alawadhi (United Arab Emirates) HA Janahi	0	2
(India) R Bopanna (United States) R Ram	6	6
2	(Pakistan) A-u-H Qureshi (Netherlands) J-J Rojer	4	4

Quarterfinals
1	(Spain) M Granollers (Spain) M López	3	4
(Israel) J Erlich (Russia) M Youzhny	6	6
3	(Sweden) R Lindstedt (Serbia) N Zimonjić	6	6
(Russia) N Davydenko (Belgium) D Norman	1	4
(India) M Bhupathi (France) M Llodra	4	6	[10]
4	(Poland) M Fyrstenberg (Poland) M Matkowski	6	4	[8]
(Romania) V Hănescu (Czech Republic) L Rosol	6	5	[4]
(India) R Bopanna (United States) R Ram	4	7	[10]

Semifinals
(Israel) J Erlich (Russia) M Youzhny	6^{2}	6^{2}
3	(Sweden) R Lindstedt (Serbia) N Zimonjić	7^{7}	7^{7}
(India) M Bhupathi (France) M Llodra	6	6^{2}	[10]
(India) R Bopanna (United States) R Ram	3	7^{7}	[5]

Final
3	(Sweden) R Lindstedt (Serbia) N Zimonjić	6^{6}	6^{6}
(India) M Bhupathi (France) M Llodra	7^{8}	7^{8}
