= 2014 Dubai Tennis Championships – Men's doubles =

Men's doubles
- 2014 Dubai Tennis Championships

Final
- Champions: (India) Rohan Bopanna (Pakistan) Aisam-ul-Haq Qureshi
- Runners-up: (Canada) Daniel Nestor (Serbia) Nenad Zimonjić
- Score: 6–4, 6–3

Details
- Draw: 16
- Seeds: 4

Events
Singles	men	women
Doubles	men	women
← 2013 ·	Dubai Tennis Championships	· 2015 →

Mahesh Bhupathi and Michaël Llodra were the defending champions, but Llodra chose not to participate. Bhupathi played alongside Denis Istomin, but they lost in the quarterfinals to Rohan Bopanna and Aisam-ul-Haq Qureshi.
Bopanna and Qureshi went on to win the title, defeating Daniel Nestor and Nenad Zimonjić in the final, 6–4, 6–3.

== Seeds ==
1. (Canada) Daniel Nestor / (Serbia) Nenad Zimonjić (final)
2. (India) Rohan Bopanna / (Pakistan) Aisam-ul-Haq Qureshi (champions)
3. (Poland) Mariusz Fyrstenberg / (Poland) Marcin Matkowski (first round)
4. (Croatia) Ivan Dodig / (Russia) Mikhail Youzhny (first round)

== Draw ==
=== Key ===
- Q = Qualifier
- WC = Wild card
- LL = Lucky loser
- Alt = Alternate
- SE = Special exempt
- PR = Protected ranking
- ITF = ITF entry
- JE = Junior exempt
- w/o = Walkover
- r = Retired
- d = Defaulted
- SR = Special ranking

=== Draw ===
First round
1	(Canada) D Nestor (Serbia) N Zimonjić	6	6
WC	(United Arab Emirates) O Alawadhi (United Arab Emirates) HA Janahi	4	0
(United Kingdom) J Marray (Russia) D Tursunov	3	6	[2]
(Spain) R Bautista Agut (Netherlands) I Sijsling	6	4	[10]
4	(Croatia) I Dodig (Russia) M Youzhny	3	5
(Argentina) JM del Potro (Czech Republic) R Štěpánek	6	7
(Austria) J Knowle (Australia) J Peers	3	6	[8]
(Germany) D Brands (Germany) F Mayer	6	4	[10]
WC	(Serbia) N Djokovic (Spain) C Gómez-Herrera	5	6	[5]
(Poland) T Bednarek (Czech Republic) L Dlouhý	7	1	[10]
(Czech Republic) L Rosol (Italy) A Seppi	7^{7}	7^{7}
3	(Poland) M Fyrstenberg (Poland) M Matkowski	6^{4}	6^{5}
(Austria) O Marach (Romania) F Mergea	6	3	[14]
(India) M Bhupathi (Uzbekistan) D Istomin	4	6	[16]
Q	(Russia) N Davydenko (Romania) V Hănescu	1	7	[8]
2	(India) R Bopanna (Pakistan) A-u-H Qureshi	6	5	[10]

Quarterfinals
1	(Canada) D Nestor (Serbia) N Zimonjić	6	6
(Spain) R Bautista Agut (Netherlands) I Sijsling	3	2
(Argentina) JM del Potro (Czech Republic) R Štěpánek
(Germany) D Brands (Germany) F Mayer	w/o
(Poland) T Bednarek (Czech Republic) L Dlouhý	6	6
(Czech Republic) L Rosol (Italy) A Seppi	2	4
(India) M Bhupathi (Uzbekistan) D Istomin	7	6^{3}	[7]
2	(India) R Bopanna (Pakistan) A-u-H Qureshi	5	7^{7}	[10]

Semifinals
1	(Canada) D Nestor (Serbia) N Zimonjić	7^{7}	7^{10}
(Germany) D Brands (Germany) F Mayer	6^{4}	6^{8}
(Poland) T Bednarek (Czech Republic) L Dlouhý	2	0
2	(India) R Bopanna (Pakistan) A-u-H Qureshi	6	6

Final
1	(Canada) D Nestor (Serbia) N Zimonjić	4	3
2	(India) R Bopanna (Pakistan) A-u-H Qureshi	6	6

== Qualifying ==
=== Seeds ===
1. (India) Purav Raja / (India) Divij Sharan (first round)
2. (Netherlands) Jesse Huta Galung / (Spain) Adrián Menéndez Maceiras (first round)

=== Qualifiers ===
1. (Russia) Nikolay Davydenko / (Romania) Victor Hănescu

=== Qualifying draw ===
First round
1	(India) Purav Raja (India) Divij Sharan	5	5
(Germany) Benjamin Becker (New Zealand) Artem Sitak	7	7
(Russia) Nikolay Davydenko (Romania) Victor Hănescu	6	6
2	(Netherlands) Jesse Huta Galung (Spain) Adrián Menéndez Maceiras	4	3

Qualifying competition
(Germany) Benjamin Becker (New Zealand) Artem Sitak	4	7	[5]
(Russia) Nikolay Davydenko (Romania) Victor Hănescu	6	5	[10]
