= 2013 Dubai Tennis Championships – Women's singles =

Women's singles
- 2013 Dubai Tennis Championships

Final
- Champion: (Czech Republic) Petra Kvitová
- Runner-up: (Italy) Sara Errani
- Score: 6–2, 1–6, 6–1

Details
- Draw: 28
- Seeds: 8

Events
Singles	men	women
Doubles	men	women
- Dubai Tennis Championships

Petra Kvitová defeated Sara Errani in the final, 6–2, 1–6, 6–1 to win the women's singles tennis title at the 2013 Dubai Tennis Championships.

Agnieszka Radwańska was the defending champion, but lost in the quarterfinals to Kvitová.

== Seeds ==
The top four seeds receive a bye into the second round.

1. (Belarus) Victoria Azarenka (withdrew because of a right foot injury)
2. (United States) Serena Williams (withdrew because of a back injury)
3. (Poland) Agnieszka Radwańska (quarterfinals)
4. (Germany) Angelique Kerber (second round)
5. (Italy) Sara Errani (final)
6. (Czech Republic) Petra Kvitová (champion)
7. (Australia) Samantha Stosur (quarterfinals)
8. (Denmark) Caroline Wozniacki (semifinals)

== Draw ==
Key

- Q = Qualifier
- WC = Wild card
- LL = Lucky loser
- Alt = Alternate
- ITF = ITF entry
- PR = Protected ranking
- SR = Special ranking
- SE = Special exempt
- JE = Junior exempt
- JR = Junior Accelerator Programme entrant
- CO = College Accelerator Programme entrant
- NG = Next Gen Accelerator Program entrant
- w/o = Walkover
- r = Retired
- d = Defaulted

=== Finals ===
Semifinals
5	(Italy) Sara Errani	6	6
(Italy) Roberta Vinci	3	3
6	(Czech Republic) Petra Kvitová	6	6
8	(Denmark) Caroline Wozniacki	3	4

Final
5	(Italy) Sara Errani	2	6	1
6	(Czech Republic) Petra Kvitová	6	1	6

=== Top half ===
First round
(Slovakia) D Cibulková	7	3	2
(Russia) N Petrova	5	6	6
(United States) S Stephens	7	3	2
(Romania) S Cîrstea	5	6	6
(Germany) J Görges	3	6	4
5	(Italy) S Errani	6	4	6
(Italy) R Vinci	6	6
Q	(Russia) S Kuznetsova	3	2
(Chinese Taipei) S-w Hsieh	6	6
(United States) V Lepchenko	1	3
(Russia) E Makarova	3	1
7	(Australia) S Stosur	6	6

Second round
LL	(Spain) C Suárez Navarro	1	0
(Russia) N Petrova	6	6
(Romania) S Cîrstea	4	4
5	(Italy) S Errani	6	6
4	(Germany) A Kerber	5	1
(Italy) R Vinci	7	6
(Chinese Taipei) S-w Hsieh	4	0
7	(Australia) S Stosur	6	6

Quarterfinals
(Russia) N Petrova	4	6	3
5	(Italy) S Errani	6	0	6
(Italy) R Vinci	6	6
7	(Australia) S Stosur	2	4

Semifinals
5	(Italy) S Errani	6	6
(Italy) R Vinci	3	3

=== Bottom half ===
First round
6	(Czech Republic) P Kvitová	6	6
Q	(Slovakia) D Hantuchová	2	1
(Russia) A Pavlyuchenkova	3	6^{5}
(Serbia) A Ivanovic	6	7^{7}
WC	(Kazakhstan) Y Putintseva	6	2	7^{8}
WC	(United Kingdom) L Robson	4	6	6^{6}
8	(Denmark) C Wozniacki	6	6
(Czech Republic) L Šafářová	2	2
Q	(Poland) U Radwańska	2	6	5
Q	(China) J Zheng	6	2	7
WC	(France) M Bartoli	3	6	6
(Czech Republic) K Zakopalová	6	4	1

Second round
6	(Czech Republic) P Kvitová	7	7^{7}
(Serbia) A Ivanovic	5	6^{1}
WC	(Kazakhstan) Y Putintseva	5	3
3	(Poland) A Radwańska	7	6
8	(Denmark) C Wozniacki	6	6
Q	(China) J Zheng	0	1
WC	(France) M Bartoli	w/o
2	(United States) S Williams

Quarterfinals
6	(Czech Republic) P Kvitová	6	6
3	(Poland) A Radwańska	2	4
8	(Denmark) C Wozniacki	4	6	6
WC	(France) M Bartoli	6	1	4

Semifinals
6	(Czech Republic) P Kvitová	6	6
8	(Denmark) C Wozniacki	3	4

== Qualifying ==
=== Seeds ===
1. (Austria) Tamira Paszek (withdrew because of a viral illness)
2. (Spain) Carla Suárez Navarro (qualifying competition, lucky loser)
3. (Russia) Elena Vesnina (second round, retired)
4. (Poland) Urszula Radwańska (qualified)
5. (Bulgaria) Tsvetana Pironkova (first round)
6. (United States) Christina McHale (second round)
7. (China) Zheng Jie (qualified)
8. (Romania) Simona Halep (second round, withdrew because of a back injury)

=== Qualifiers ===
1. (Russia) Svetlana Kuznetsova
2. (Slovakia) Daniela Hantuchová
3. (China) Zheng Jie
4. (Poland) Urszula Radwańska

=== Lucky loser ===
1. (Spain) Carla Suárez Navarro

=== Draw ===
==== First qualifier ====
First round
Alt	(Poland) Marta Domachowska	1	0
WC	(Russia) Svetlana Kuznetsova	6	6
(Japan) Misaki Doi	3	5
(Russia) Daria Gavrilova	6	7
(Turkey) Çağla Büyükakçay	2	5
(China) Zhang Shuai	6	7
(Spain) Anabel Medina Garrigues	6	6
5	(Bulgaria) Tsvetana Pironkova	4	2

Second round
WC	(Russia) Svetlana Kuznetsova	6	6
(Russia) Daria Gavrilova	2	2
(China) Zhang Shuai	5	6	2
(Spain) Anabel Medina Garrigues	7	3	6

Qualifying competition
WC	(Russia) Svetlana Kuznetsova	6	4	6
(Spain) Anabel Medina Garrigues	2	6	1

==== Second qualifier ====
First round
2	(Spain) Carla Suárez Navarro	6	6
(Belarus) Olga Govortsova	3	1
WC	(Oman) Fatma Al-Nabhani	2	3
(Australia) Olivia Rogowska	6	6
(Slovakia) Daniela Hantuchová	3	6	6
(Czech Republic) Karolína Plíšková	6	2	4
(Greece) Eleni Daniilidou	2	6	2
8	(Romania) Simona Halep	6	4	6

Second round
2	(Spain) Carla Suárez Navarro	6	6
(Australia) Olivia Rogowska	0	2
(Slovakia) Daniela Hantuchová
8	(Romania) Simona Halep	w/o

Qualifying competition
2	(Spain) Carla Suárez Navarro	2	2
(Slovakia) Daniela Hantuchová	6	6

==== Third qualifier ====
First round
3	(Russia) Elena Vesnina	7	6
(United States) Bethanie Mattek-Sands	5	3
WC	(Russia) Ekaterina Bychkova	6	3	6
(Australia) Anastasia Rodionova	4	6	3
(Japan) Ayumi Morita	6	6
(Russia) Vera Dushevina	3	2
(Germany) Kathrin Wörle	2	1
7	(China) Zheng Jie	6	6

Second round
3	(Russia) Elena Vesnina	5	1^{r}
WC	(Russia) Ekaterina Bychkova	7	3
(Japan) Ayumi Morita	6	1	0^{r}
7	(China) Zheng Jie	1	6	2

Qualifying competition
WC	(Russia) Ekaterina Bychkova	1	6	5
7	(China) Zheng Jie	6	2	7

==== Fourth qualifier ====
First round
4	(Poland) Urszula Radwańska	6	4	6
(Ukraine) Yuliya Beygelzimer	2	6	3
(Italy) Maria Elena Camerin	3	0
(Uzbekistan) Akgul Amanmuradova	6	6
(Japan) Kurumi Nara	4	6	6
(Czech Republic) Kristýna Plíšková	6	1	1
(Chinese Taipei) Chang Kai-chen	0	6	4
6	(United States) Christina McHale	6	2	6

Second round
4	(Poland) Urszula Radwańska	7	6
(Uzbekistan) Akgul Amanmuradova	5	3
(Japan) Kurumi Nara	6	2	6
6	(United States) Christina McHale	4	6	3

Qualifying competition
4	(Poland) Urszula Radwańska	6	6
(Japan) Kurumi Nara	3	3
