= 1996 Dubai Tennis Championships – Doubles =

Doubles
- 1996 Dubai Tennis Championships

Final
- Champions: (Zimbabwe) Byron Black (Canada) Grant Connell
- Runners-up: (Czech Republic) Karel Nováček (Czech Republic) Jiří Novák
- Score: 6–0, 6–1

Details
- Draw: 16
- Seeds: 4

Events
Singles	Doubles
← 1995 ·	Dubai Tennis Championships	· 1997 →

Grant Connell and Patrick Galbraith were the defending champions but only Connell competed that year with Byron Black.

Black and Connell won in the final 6–0, 6–1 against Karel Nováček and Jiří Novák.

== Seeds ==
1. (Zimbabwe) Byron Black / (Canada) Grant Connell (champions)
2. (United States) Patrick McEnroe / (Australia) Sandon Stolle (quarterfinals)
3. (Argentina) Luis Lobo / (Spain) Javier Sánchez (first round)
4. (Sweden) Stefan Edberg / (Czech Republic) Petr Korda (first round)

== Draw ==
=== Key ===
- Q = Qualifier
- WC = Wild card
- LL = Lucky loser
- Alt = Alternate
- SE = Special exempt
- PR = Protected ranking
- ITF = ITF entry
- JE = Junior exempt
- w/o = Walkover
- r = Retired
- d = Defaulted
- SR = Special ranking

First round
1	(Zimbabwe) B Black (Canada) G Connell	6	7
(United Kingdom) N Broad (South Africa) P Norval	2	5
(South Africa) L Bale (South Africa) W Ferreira	2	1
(South Africa) D Adams (South Africa) E Ferreira	6	6
3	(Argentina) L Lobo (Spain) J Sánchez	6	2	3
(South Africa) J-L de Jager (South Africa) G Muller	4	6	6
(Australia) W Arthurs (Australia) A Kratzmann	3	6	6
(Australia) J Eagle (Australia) A Florent	6	4	2
(Czech Republic) K Nováček (Czech Republic) J Novák	7	3	6
Q	(Czech Republic) T Krupa (Czech Republic) P Vízner	5	6	2
WC	(Italy) A Gaudenzi (Croatia) G Ivanišević	6	6
4	(Sweden) S Edberg (Czech Republic) P Korda	7	4	r
WC	(United States) J Courier (Sweden) T Enqvist	7	6
(Netherlands) H J Davids (Germany) D Prinosil	6	4
WC	(Sweden) M Gustafsson (Ukraine) A Medvedev	4	1
2	(United States) P McEnroe (Australia) S Stolle	6	6

Quarterfinals
1	(Zimbabwe) B Black (Canada) G Connell	6	6
(South Africa) D Adams (South Africa) E Ferreira	3	4
(South Africa) J-L de Jager (South Africa) G Muller	4	3
(Australia) W Arthurs (Australia) A Kratzmann	6	6
(Czech Republic) K Nováček (Czech Republic) J Novák	6	7
WC	(Italy) A Gaudenzi (Croatia) G Ivanišević	4	6
WC	(United States) J Courier (Sweden) T Enqvist	6	5	7
2	(United States) P McEnroe (Australia) S Stolle	4	7	5

Semifinals
1	(Zimbabwe) B Black (Canada) G Connell	6	6
(Australia) W Arthurs (Australia) A Kratzmann	2	1
(Czech Republic) K Nováček (Czech Republic) J Novák	w/o
WC	(United States) J Courier (Sweden) T Enqvist

Final
1	(Zimbabwe) B Black (Canada) G Connell	6	6
(Czech Republic) K Nováček (Czech Republic) J Novák	0	1
