= 2014 Dubai Tennis Championships – Women's doubles =

Women's doubles
- 2014 Dubai Tennis Championships

Final
- Champions: (Russia) Alla Kudryavtseva (Australia) Anastasia Rodionova
- Runners-up: (United States) Raquel Kops-Jones (United States) Abigail Spears
- Score: 6–2, 5–7, [10–8]

Events
Singles	men	women
Doubles	men	women
- Dubai Tennis Championships

Bethanie Mattek-Sands and Sania Mirza were the defending champions, but Mattek-Sands chose not to participate. Mirza played alongside Cara Black, but lost to Andrea Hlaváčková and Lucie Šafářová in the first round.
Alla Kudryavtseva and Anastasia Rodionova won the title, defeating Raquel Kops-Jones and Abigail Spears in the final, 6–2, 5–7, [10–8].

== Seeds ==
1. (Italy) Sara Errani / (Italy) Roberta Vinci (quarterfinals)
2. (Russia) Ekaterina Makarova / (Russia) Elena Vesnina (quarterfinals)
3. (Czech Republic) Květa Peschke / (Slovenia) Katarina Srebotnik (first round)
4. (Zimbabwe) Cara Black / (India) Sania Mirza (first round)

== Draw ==
Key

- Q = Qualifier
- WC = Wild card
- LL = Lucky loser
- Alt = Alternate
- ITF = ITF entry
- PR = Protected ranking
- SR = Special ranking
- SE = Special exempt
- JE = Junior exempt
- JR = Junior Accelerator Programme entrant
- CO = College Accelerator Programme entrant
- NG = Next Gen Accelerator Program entrant
- w/o = Walkover
- r = Retired
- d = Defaulted

=== Draw ===
First round
1	(Italy) S Errani (Italy) R Vinci	6	6
(Russia) A Pavlyuchenkova (Russia) N Petrova	4	4
(Chinese Taipei) H-c Chan (United States) L Huber	3	6^{4}
(United States) R Kops-Jones (United States) A Spears	6	7^{7}
3	(Czech Republic) K Peschke (Slovenia) K Srebotnik	1	6	[6]
WC	(Italy) F Pennetta (Australia) S Stosur	6	1	[10]
(Russia) V Dushevina (Spain) A Parra Santonja	4	3
(Germany) A-L Grönefeld (Poland) A Rosolska	6	6
(United States) L Raymond (China) S Zhang	0	6	[10]
Alt	(Belgium) K Flipkens (Czech Republic) P Kvitová	6	4	[7]
(Czech Republic) A Hlaváčková (Czech Republic) L Šafářová	7^{7}	5	[11]
4	(Zimbabwe) C Black (India) S Mirza	6^{5}	7	[9]
(Serbia) J Janković (Russia) A Kleybanova	6^{4}	2
(Russia) A Kudryavtseva (Australia) A Rodionova	7^{7}	6
WC	(United States) S Williams (United States) V Williams	4	6	[4]
2	(Russia) E Makarova (Russia) E Vesnina	6	4	[10]

Quarterfinals
1	(Italy) S Errani (Italy) R Vinci	4	1
(United States) R Kops-Jones (United States) A Spears	6	6
WC	(Italy) F Pennetta (Australia) S Stosur	6	7
(Germany) A-L Grönefeld (Poland) A Rosolska	3	5
(United States) L Raymond (China) S Zhang	3	5
(Czech Republic) A Hlaváčková (Czech Republic) L Šafářová	6	7
(Russia) A Kudryavtseva (Australia) A Rodionova	6	6
2	(Russia) E Makarova (Russia) E Vesnina	4	4

Semifinals
(United States) R Kops-Jones (United States) A Spears	6	6
WC	(Italy) F Pennetta (Australia) S Stosur	3	2
(Czech Republic) A Hlaváčková (Czech Republic) L Šafářová	4	4
(Russia) A Kudryavtseva (Australia) A Rodionova	6	6

Final
(United States) R Kops-Jones (United States) A Spears	2	7	[8]
(Russia) A Kudryavtseva (Australia) A Rodionova	6	5	[10]
