= 2014 Dubai Tennis Championships – Men's singles =

Men's singles
- 2014 Dubai Tennis Championships

Final
- Champion: (Switzerland) Roger Federer
- Runner-up: (Czech Republic) Tomáš Berdych
- Score: 3–6, 6–4, 6–3

Details
- Draw: 32
- Seeds: 8

Events
Singles	men	women
Doubles	men	women
- Dubai Tennis Championships

Roger Federer defeated Tomáš Berdych in the final, 3–6, 6–4, 6–3 to win the men's singles tennis title at the 2014 Dubai Tennis Championships. It was his record sixth Dubai title.

Novak Djokovic was the defending champion, but lost to Federer in the semifinals.

== Seeds ==
1. (Serbia) Novak Djokovic (semifinals)
2. (Argentina) Juan Martín del Potro (first round, retired because of a wrist injury)
3. (Czech Republic) Tomáš Berdych (final)
4. (Switzerland) Roger Federer (champion)

5. (France) Jo-Wilfried Tsonga (quarterfinals)
6. (Russia) Mikhail Youzhny (quarterfinals, withdrew because of illness)
7. (Germany) Philipp Kohlschreiber (semifinals)
8. (Russia) Dmitry Tursunov (second round)

== Draw ==
Key

- Q = Qualifier
- WC = Wild card
- LL = Lucky loser
- Alt = Alternate
- ITF = ITF entry
- PR = Protected ranking
- SR = Special ranking
- SE = Special exempt
- JE = Junior exempt
- JR = Junior Accelerator Programme entrant
- CO = College Accelerator Programme entrant
- NG = Next Gen Accelerator Program entrant
- w/o = Walkover
- r = Retired
- d = Defaulted

=== Finals ===
Semifinals
1	(Serbia) Novak Djokovic	6	3	2
4	(Switzerland) Roger Federer	3	6	6
3	(Czech Republic) Tomáš Berdych	7	7
7	(Germany) Philipp Kohlschreiber	5	5

Final
4	(Switzerland) Roger Federer	3	6	6
3	(Czech Republic) Tomáš Berdych	6	4	3

=== Top half ===
First round
1	(Serbia) N Djokovic	6	6
(Uzbekistan) D Istomin	3	3
(Spain) R Bautista-Agut	6	6
Q	(Romania) A Ungur	1	3
(Russia) T Gabashvili	6	4	6^{6}
WC	(United Kingdom) J Ward	2	6	7^{8}
(Poland) M Przysiężny	3	4
6	(Russia) M Youzhny	6	6
4	(Switzerland) R Federer	6	6
(Germany) B Becker	1	4
(Czech Republic) R Štěpánek	5	6	6
(United States) M Russell	7	3	1
(Czech Republic) L Rosol	7^{7}	6
(Germany) D Brands	6^{4}	4
Q	(Slovakia) L Lacko	5	1
8	(Russia) D Tursunov	7	6

Second round
1	(Serbia) N Djokovic	6	6
(Spain) R Bautista-Agut	1	3
WC	(United Kingdom) J Ward	1	6^{3}
6	(Russia) M Youzhny	6	7^{7}
4	(Switzerland) R Federer	6	6^{4}	6
(Czech Republic) R Štěpánek	2	7^{7}	3
(Czech Republic) L Rosol	6	7^{7}
8	(Russia) D Tursunov	4	6^{4}

Quarterfinals
1	(Serbia) N Djokovic	w/o
6	(Russia) M Youzhny
4	(Switzerland) R Federer	6	6
(Czech Republic) L Rosol	2	2

Semifinals
1	(Serbia) N Djokovic	6	3	2
4	(Switzerland) R Federer	3	6	6

=== Bottom half ===
First round
5	(France) J-W Tsonga	6	6
(Romania) V Hănescu	2	4
(Russia) N Davydenko	7^{8}	6
(Kazakhstan) A Golubev	6^{6}	4
(Croatia) I Dodig	6^{6}	7^{7}	2
(Ukraine) S Stakhovsky	7^{8}	6^{4}	6
Q	(Romania) M Copil	3	4
3	(Czech Republic) T Berdych	6	6
7	(Germany) P Kohlschreiber	6	6
Q	(Netherlands) T de Bakker	3	3
(Italy) A Seppi	4	6	7
(Germany) F Mayer	6	1	5
WC	(Tunisia) M Jaziri	0	6	7^{7}
(Netherlands) I Sijsling	6	4	6^{4}
WC	(India) S Devvarman	7^{7}	0
2	(Argentina) JM del Potro	6^{3}	0^{r}

Second round
5	(France) J-W Tsonga	w/o
(Russia) N Davydenko
(Ukraine) S Stakhovsky	2	1
3	(Czech Republic) T Berdych	6	6
7	(Germany) P Kohlschreiber	6	6
(Italy) A Seppi	3	3
WC	(Tunisia) M Jaziri	6	7
WC	(India) S Devvarman	3	5

Quarterfinals
5	(France) J-W Tsonga	4	3
3	(Czech Republic) T Berdych	6	6
7	(Germany) P Kohlschreiber	6	6
WC	(Tunisia) M Jaziri	2	3

Semifinals
3	(Czech Republic) T Berdych	7	7
7	(Germany) P Kohlschreiber	5	5

== Qualifying ==
=== Seeds ===
1. (Netherlands) Jesse Huta Galung (qualifying competition)
2. (Slovakia) Lukáš Lacko (qualified)
3. (Germany) Peter Gojowczyk (first round)
4. (Slovenia) Blaž Kavčič (withdrew)
5. (Romania) Adrian Ungur (qualified)
6. (Germany) Michael Berrer (first round)
7. (Russia) Andrey Kuznetsov (qualifying competition)
8. (Netherlands) Thiemo de Bakker (qualified)

=== Qualifiers ===
1. (Romania) Marius Copil
2. (Slovakia) Lukáš Lacko
3. (Netherlands) Thiemo de Bakker
4. (Romania) Adrian Ungur

=== Qualifying draw ===
==== First qualifier ====
First round
1	(Netherlands) Jesse Huta Galung	6	6
WC	(Ukraine) Sergei Bubka	4	0
(Romania) Marius Copil	6^{3}	6	6
6	(Germany) Michael Berrer	7^{7}	4	4

Qualifying competition
1	(Netherlands) Jesse Huta Galung	6^{0}	5
(Romania) Marius Copil	7^{7}	7

==== Second qualifier ====
First round
2	(Slovakia) Lukáš Lacko	6	3	6
(Spain) Adrián Menéndez-Maceiras	4	6	3
WC	(United Arab Emirates) Omar Alawadhi	0	1
7	(Russia) Andrey Kuznetsov	6	6

Qualifying competition
2	(Slovakia) Lukáš Lacko	6	6
7	(Russia) Andrey Kuznetsov	2	2

==== Third qualifier ====
First round
3	(Germany) Peter Gojowczyk	3	3
(Switzerland) Marco Chiudinelli	6	6
WC	(United Arab Emirates) Hamad Abbas Janahi	2	1
8	(Netherlands) Thiemo de Bakker	6	6

Qualifying competition
(Switzerland) Marco Chiudinelli	4	4
8	(Netherlands) Thiemo de Bakker	6	6

==== Fourth qualifier ====
First round
Alt	(Spain) Carlos Gómez-Herrera	6^{9}	6	6^{2}
(Greece) Theodoros Angelinos	7^{11}	1	7^{7}
(Canada) Steven Diez	0	6	6^{3}
5	(Romania) Adrian Ungur	6	4	7^{7}

Qualifying competition
(Greece) Theodoros Angelinos	4	2
5	(Romania) Adrian Ungur	6	6
