= 2014 Dubai Tennis Championships – Women's singles =

Women's singles
- 2014 Dubai Tennis Championships

Final
- Champion: (United States) Venus Williams
- Runner-up: (France) Alizé Cornet
- Score: 6–3, 6–0

Details
- Draw: 28
- Seeds: 8

Events
Singles	men	women
Doubles	men	women
- Dubai Tennis Championships

Venus Williams defeated Alizé Cornet in the final, 6–3, 6–0 to win the women's singles tennis title at the 2014 Dubai Tennis Championships. It was her 45th career WTA Tour title. She also extended her winning streak at the Dubai Tennis Championships to 15 matches, having previously won when she last played in 2009 and 2010.

Petra Kvitová was the defending champion, but lost in the second round to Carla Suárez Navarro.

== Seeds ==
The top four seeds receive a bye into the second round.

1. (United States) Serena Williams (semifinals)
2. (Poland) Agnieszka Radwańska (second round)
3. (Czech Republic) Petra Kvitová (second round)
4. (Italy) Sara Errani (second round)

5. (Serbia) Jelena Janković (quarterfinals)
6. (Germany) Angelique Kerber (first round)
7. (Romania) Simona Halep (first round, retired because of a right Achilles tendon strain)
8. (Denmark) Caroline Wozniacki (semifinals)

== Draw ==
Key

- Q = Qualifier
- WC = Wild card
- LL = Lucky loser
- Alt = Alternate
- ITF = ITF entry
- PR = Protected ranking
- SR = Special ranking
- SE = Special exempt
- JE = Junior exempt
- JR = Junior Accelerator Programme entrant
- CO = College Accelerator Programme entrant
- NG = Next Gen Accelerator Program entrant
- w/o = Walkover
- r = Retired
- d = Defaulted

=== Finals ===
Semifinals
1/WC	(United States) Serena Williams	4	4
(France) Alizé Cornet	6	6
8	(Denmark) Caroline Wozniacki	3	2
WC	(United States) Venus Williams	6	6

Final
(France) Alizé Cornet	3	0
WC	(United States) Venus Williams	6	6

=== Top half ===
First round
PR	(Russia) A Kleybanova	4	7^{7}	4
(Russia) E Makarova	6	6^{3}	6
(United States) S Stephens	3	5
(Czech Republic) L Šafářová	6	7
Q	(Ukraine) M Zanevska	4	3
5	(Serbia) J Janković	6	6
(Spain) C Suárez Navarro	6	6
WC	(Russia) N Petrova	3	2
(Belgium) K Flipkens	6	7
Q	(Czech Republic) Ka Plíšková	1	5
(France) A Cornet	6	1
7	(Romania) S Halep	1	1^{r}

Second round
1/WC	(United States) S Williams	7^{10}	6
(Russia) E Makarova	6^{8}	0
(Czech Republic) L Šafářová	5	4
5	(Serbia) J Janković	7	6
3	(Czech Republic) P Kvitová	6	4	6^{4}
(Spain) C Suárez Navarro	1	6	7^{7}
(Belgium) K Flipkens	3	4
(France) A Cornet	6	6

Quarterfinals
1/WC	(United States) S Williams	6	6
5	(Serbia) J Janković	2	2
(Spain) C Suárez Navarro	5	3
(France) A Cornet	7	6

Semifinals
1/WC	(United States) S Williams	4	4
(France) A Cornet	6	6

=== Bottom half ===
First round
8	(Denmark) C Wozniacki	2	6	6
(Germany) S Lisicki	6	3	3
(Australia) S Stosur	6	1	4
Q	(Germany) A Beck	1	6	6
(Romania) S Cîrstea	6	6
(Italy) R Vinci	4	3
6	(Germany) A Kerber	6	3	6^{6}
(Serbia) A Ivanovic	3	6	7^{8}
WC	(United States) V Williams	6	6
(Russia) E Vesnina	3	2
PR	(Estonia) K Kanepi	5	4
Q	(Italy) F Pennetta	7	6

Second round
8	(Denmark) C Wozniacki	6	6
Q	(Germany) A Beck	4	4
(Romania) S Cîrstea	6	5	6
4	(Italy) S Errani	2	7	1
(Serbia) A Ivanovic	2	1
WC	(United States) V Williams	6	6
Q	(Italy) F Pennetta	6	6
2	(Poland) A Radwańska	4	1

Quarterfinals
8	(Denmark) C Wozniacki	6	6
(Romania) S Cîrstea	1	2
WC	(United States) V Williams	6	7
Q	(Italy) F Pennetta	3	5

Semifinals
8	(Denmark) C Wozniacki	3	2
WC	(United States) V Williams	6	6

== Qualifying ==
=== Seeds ===
1. (Canada) Eugenie Bouchard (qualifying competition)
2. (Russia) Anastasia Pavlyuchenkova (withdrew, still competing in Doha)
3. (Italy) Flavia Pennetta (qualified)
4. (Germany) Andrea Petkovic (second round)
5. (Austria) Yvonne Meusburger (qualifying competition)
6. (Italy) Karin Knapp (second round)
7. (United States) Bethanie Mattek-Sands (second round)
8. (China) Zhang Shuai (second round)
9. (United States) Varvara Lepchenko (first round)

=== Qualifiers ===
1. (Germany) Annika Beck
2. (Ukraine) Maryna Zanevska
3. (Italy) Flavia Pennetta
4. (Czech Republic) Karolína Plíšková

=== Draw ===
==== First qualifier ====
First round
1	(Canada) Eugenie Bouchard	5	6	6
(Russia) Vera Dushevina	7	3	3
(Bulgaria) Tsvetana Pironkova	6^{4}	7^{7}	5
(Russia) Vitalia Diatchenko	7^{7}	6^{5}	0^{r}
(Germany) Annika Beck	2	6	6
Alt	(United States) Abigail Spears	6	0	2
(Czech Republic) Andrea Hlaváčková	1	2
6	(Italy) Karin Knapp	6	6

Second round
1	(Canada) Eugenie Bouchard	6	6
(Bulgaria) Tsvetana Pironkova	2	4
(Germany) Annika Beck	6	7
6	(Italy) Karin Knapp	0	5

Qualifying competition
1	(Canada) Eugenie Bouchard	1	4
(Germany) Annika Beck	6	6

==== Second qualifier ====
First round
9	(United States) Varvara Lepchenko	4	3
(Ukraine) Maryna Zanevska	6	6
(Croatia) Petra Martić	3	6	6
(Slovenia) Tadeja Majerič	6	4	2
(Germany) Mona Barthel	6	6^{4}	6
(Australia) Anastasia Rodionova	3	7^{7}	3
(Czech Republic) Kristýna Plíšková	3	4
7	(United States) Bethanie Mattek-Sands	6	6

Second round
(Ukraine) Maryna Zanevska	6	7^{9}
(Croatia) Petra Martić	4	6^{7}
(Germany) Mona Barthel	3	6	7^{7}
7	(United States) Bethanie Mattek-Sands	6	4	6^{2}

Qualifying competition
(Ukraine) Maryna Zanevska	7^{10}	6
(Germany) Mona Barthel	6^{8}	4

==== Third qualifier ====
First round
3	(Italy) Flavia Pennetta	3	6	6
(Slovakia) Kristina Kučová	6	1	4
(Japan) Misaki Doi	2	6^{4}
(Kazakhstan) Yulia Putintseva	6	7^{7}
(France) Kristina Mladenovic	6	4	6
WC	(Spain) Arantxa Parra Santonja	4	6	3
WC	(Slovakia) Michaela Hončová	3	1
5	(Austria) Yvonne Meusburger	6	6

Second round
3	(Italy) Flavia Pennetta	7^{7}	6
(Kazakhstan) Yulia Putintseva	6^{3}	0
(France) Kristina Mladenovic	7^{7}	3	1
5	(Austria) Yvonne Meusburger	6^{3}	6	6

Qualifying competition
3	(Italy) Flavia Pennetta	6	6
5	(Austria) Yvonne Meusburger	1	3

==== Fourth qualifier ====
First round
4	(Germany) Andrea Petkovic	6	6
(France) Claire Feuerstein	3	2
(Italy) Camila Giorgi	7^{9}	6
WC	(Poland) Marta Domachowska	6^{7}	1
(Russia) Alla Kudryavtseva	2	7	5
(Czech Republic) Karolína Plíšková	6	5	7
WC	(Turkey) Çağla Büyükakçay	3	2
8	(China) Zhang Shuai	6	6

Second round
4	(Germany) Andrea Petkovic	1	2
(Italy) Camila Giorgi	6	6
(Czech Republic) Karolína Plíšková	7^{7}	6
8	(China) Zhang Shuai	6^{5}	1

Qualifying competition
(Italy) Camila Giorgi	5	2
(Czech Republic) Karolína Plíšková	7	6
