= 2013 Dubai Tennis Championships – Men's singles =

Men's singles
- 2013 Dubai Tennis Championships

Final
- Champion: (Serbia) Novak Djokovic
- Runner-up: (Czech Republic) Tomáš Berdych
- Score: 7–5, 6–3

Details
- Draw: 32
- Seeds: 8

Events
Singles	men	women
Doubles	men	women
- Dubai Tennis Championships

Roger Federer was the defending champion, but was eliminated by Tomáš Berdych in the semifinals.
Novak Djokovic won the title, defeating Berdych in the final, 7–5, 6–3.

== Seeds ==
1. (Serbia) Novak Djokovic (champion)
2. (Switzerland) Roger Federer (semifinals)
3. (Czech Republic) Tomáš Berdych (final)
4. (Argentina) Juan Martín del Potro (semifinals)
5. (France) Jo-Wilfried Tsonga (first round)
6. (Serbia) Janko Tipsarević (first round)
7. (Italy) Andreas Seppi (quarterfinals)
8. (Russia) Mikhail Youzhny (second round)

== Draw ==
Key

- Q = Qualifier
- WC = Wild card
- LL = Lucky loser
- Alt = Alternate
- ITF = ITF entry
- PR = Protected ranking
- SR = Special ranking
- SE = Special exempt
- JE = Junior exempt
- JR = Junior Accelerator Programme entrant
- CO = College Accelerator Programme entrant
- NG = Next Gen Accelerator Program entrant
- w/o = Walkover
- r = Retired
- d = Defaulted

=== Finals ===
Semifinals
1	(Serbia) Novak Djokovic	6	7^{7}
4	(Argentina) Juan Martín del Potro	3	6^{4}
3	(Czech Republic) Tomáš Berdych	3	7^{10}	6
2	(Switzerland) Roger Federer	6	6^{8}	4

Final
1	(Serbia) Novak Djokovic	7	6
3	(Czech Republic) Tomáš Berdych	5	3

=== Top half ===
First round
1	(Serbia) N Djokovic	6	6
(Serbia) V Troicki	1	4
(Belgium) D Goffin	2	5
(Spain) R Bautista-Agut	6	7
(Czech Republic) L Rosol	6	7
Q	(Italy) M Viola	3	5
(France) P-H Mathieu	3	5
7	(Italy) A Seppi	6	7
4	(Argentina) JM del Potro	4	6	7^{7}
(Cyprus) M Baghdatis	6	4	6^{4}
PR	(India) S Devvarman	6	6
Q	(Russia) I Kunitsyn	1	4
Q	(France) F Serra	6^{7}	4
Q	(Germany) D Brands	7^{9}	6
(Slovenia) B Kavčič	6	1	3
8	(Russia) M Youzhny	1	6	6

Second round
1	(Serbia) N Djokovic	6	7^{7}
(Spain) R Bautista-Agut	1	6^{4}
(Czech Republic) L Rosol	4	6^{4}
7	(Italy) A Seppi	6	7^{7}
4	(Argentina) JM del Potro	6	6
PR	(India) S Devvarman	4	4
Q	(Germany) D Brands	6	6
8	(Russia) M Youzhny	4	4

Quarterfinals
1	(Serbia) N Djokovic	6	6
7	(Italy) A Seppi	0	3
4	(Argentina) JM del Potro	6	6
Q	(Germany) D Brands	4	2

Semifinals
1	(Serbia) N Djokovic	6	7^{7}
4	(Argentina) JM del Potro	3	6^{4}

=== Bottom half ===
First round
5	(France) J-W Tsonga	6^{3}	2
(France) M Llodra	7^{7}	6
WC	(Russia) D Tursunov	4	6	6
(Czech Republic) J Hájek	6	1	2
(Germany) T Kamke	4	6	6
(Kazakhstan) M Kukushkin	6	4	4
WC	(United States) R Ram	1	3
3	(Czech Republic) T Berdych	6	6
6	(Serbia) J Tipsarević	0	5
(Russia) N Davydenko	6	7
(Romania) V Hănescu	3
(Australia) B Tomic	2^{r}
(Spain) M Granollers	6	6
(Spain) A Montañés	3	1
WC	(Tunisia) M Jaziri	7	0	2
2	(Switzerland) R Federer	5	6	6

Second round
(France) M Llodra	6^{5}	6	3
WC	(Russia) D Tursunov	7^{7}	2	6
(Germany) T Kamke	5	1
3	(Czech Republic) T Berdych	7	6
(Russia) N Davydenko	6	7^{7}
(Romania) V Hănescu	4	6^{2}
(Spain) M Granollers	3	4
2	(Switzerland) R Federer	6	6

Quarterfinals
WC	(Russia) D Tursunov	3	2
3	(Czech Republic) T Berdych	6	6
(Russia) N Davydenko	2	2
2	(Switzerland) R Federer	6	6

Semifinals
3	(Czech Republic) T Berdych	3	7^{10}	6
2	(Switzerland) R Federer	6	6^{8}	4

== Qualifying ==
=== Seeds ===
1. (Germany) Daniel Brands (qualified)
2. (Germany) Matthias Bachinger (qualifying competition)
3. (Austria) Andreas Haider-Maurer (first round)
4. (Germany) Michael Berrer (first round)
5. (Italy) Matteo Viola (qualified)
6. (Switzerland) Marco Chiudinelli (qualifying competition)
7. (France) Florent Serra (qualified)
8. (Ukraine) Ivan Sergeyev (qualifying competition)

=== Qualifiers ===
1. (Germany) Daniel Brands
2. (Italy) Matteo Viola
3. (France) Florent Serra
4. (Russia) Igor Kunitsyn

=== Draw ===
==== First qualifier ====
First round
1	(Germany) Daniel Brands	6	7^{7}
(Slovakia) Karol Beck	4	6^{4}
WC	(United Arab Emirates) Omar Awadhy	3	5
6	(Switzerland) Marco Chiudinelli	6	7

Qualifying competition
1	(Germany) Daniel Brands	7^{7}	7^{7}
6	(Switzerland) Marco Chiudinelli	6^{3}	6^{5}

==== Second qualifier ====
First round
2	(Germany) Matthias Bachinger	6	6
WC	(Kuwait) Mohammed Ghareeb	1	3
WC	(Serbia) Marko Djokovic	4	1
5	(Italy) Matteo Viola	6	6

Qualifying competition
2	(Germany) Matthias Bachinger	4	5
5	(Italy) Matteo Viola	6	7

==== Third qualifier ====
First round
3	(Austria) Andreas Haider-Maurer	3	3
Alt	(Spain) Carlos Gómez-Herrera	6	6
(United States) Michael Yani	6	6^{2}	4
7	(France) Florent Serra	4	7^{7}	6

Qualifying competition
Alt	(Spain) Carlos Gómez-Herrera	3	2
7	(France) Florent Serra	6	6

==== Fourth qualifier ====
First round
4	(Germany) Michael Berrer	4	5
(Russia) Igor Kunitsyn	6	7
(Turkey) Marsel İlhan	6^{4}	2
8	(Ukraine) Ivan Sergeyev	7^{7}	6

Qualifying competition
(Russia) Igor Kunitsyn	2	6	4
8	(Ukraine) Ivan Sergeyev	6	4	0^{r}
