= 1993 Dubai Tennis Championships – Doubles =

Doubles
- 1993 Dubai Tennis Championships

Final
- Champions: (Australia) John Fitzgerald (Sweden) Anders Järryd
- Runners-up: (Canada) Grant Connell (United States) Patrick Galbraith
- Score: 6–2, 6–1

Details
- Draw: 16
- Seeds: 4

Events
| Singles | Doubles |
- Dubai Tennis Championships

In the first edition of the tournament, John Fitzgerald and Anders Järryd won the title by defeating Grant Connell and Patrick Galbraith 6–2, 6–1 in the final.

== Seeds ==
1. (Australia) John Fitzgerald / (Sweden) Anders Järryd (champions)
2. (Canada) Grant Connell / (United States) Patrick Galbraith (final)
3. (South Africa) David Adams / (Russia) Andrei Olhovskiy (quarterfinals)
4. (Spain) Emilio Sánchez / (Spain) Javier Sánchez (quarterfinals)

== Draw ==
Key

- Q = Qualifier
- WC = Wild card
- LL = Lucky loser
- Alt = Alternate
- ITF = ITF entry
- PR = Protected ranking
- SR = Special ranking
- SE = Special exempt
- JE = Junior exempt
- JR = Junior Accelerator Programme entrant
- CO = College Accelerator Programme entrant
- NG = Next Gen Accelerator Program entrant
- w/o = Walkover
- r = Retired
- d = Defaulted

=== Draw ===
First round
1 | (Australia) J Fitzgerald (Sweden) A Järryd | 6 | 6
Q | (Germany) K Braasch (Germany) B Karbacher | 3 | 4
WC | (Italy) A Gaudenzi (Austria) T Muster | 6 | 4 | 5
WC | (Russia) A Cherkasov (Russia) A Volkov | 1 | 6 | 7
3 | (South Africa) D Adams (Russia) A Olhovskiy | 7 | 6 | 7
(Sweden) R Båthman (Sweden) R Bergh | 6 | 7 | 6
(United States) F Montana (United States) G Van Emburgh | 4 | 6
(Czech Republic) K Nováček (Germany) CU Steeb | 6 | 7
(Netherlands) HJ Davids (Czech Republic) L Pimek | 3 | 6 | 6
(United States) S Cannon (United States) S Melville | 6 | 2 | 7
(Spain) T Carbonell (Venezuela) N Pereira | 7 | 4 | 5
4 | (Spain) E Sánchez (Spain) J Sánchez | 5 | 6 | 7
(United Kingdom) J Bates (Zimbabwe) B Black | 6 | 6
(United States) B Pearce (South Africa) B Talbot | 3 | 2
(United States) B Garnett (United States) T Witsken | 2 | 3
2 | (Canada) G Connell (United States) P Galbraith | 6 | 6

Quarterfinals
1 | (Australia) J Fitzgerald (Sweden) A Järryd | 6 | 6
WC | (Russia) A Cherkasov (Russia) A Volkov | 3 | 0
3 | (South Africa) D Adams (Russia) A Olhovskiy | 4 | 6 | 5
(Czech Republic) K Nováček (Germany) CU Steeb | 6 | 2 | 7
(United States) S Cannon (United States) S Melville | 6 | 6
4 | (Spain) E Sánchez (Spain) J Sánchez | 3 | 2
(United Kingdom) J Bates (Zimbabwe) B Black | 3 | 2
2 | (Canada) G Connell (United States) P Galbraith | 6 | 6

Semifinals
1 | (Australia) J Fitzgerald (Sweden) A Järryd | 6 | 6
(Czech Republic) K Nováček (Germany) CU Steeb | 1 | 4
(United States) S Cannon (United States) S Melville | 2 | 7 | 4
2 | (Canada) G Connell (United States) P Galbraith | 6 | 6 | 6

Final
1 | (Australia) J Fitzgerald (Sweden) A Järryd | 6 | 6
2 | (Canada) G Connell (United States) P Galbraith | 2 | 1
