= 1994 Dubai Open – Doubles =

Doubles
- 1994 Dubai Tennis Championships

Final
- Champions: (Australia) Todd Woodbridge (Australia) Mark Woodforde
- Runners-up: (Australia) Darren Cahill (Australia) John Fitzgerald
- Score: 6–7, 6–4, 6–2

Details
- Draw: 16
- Seeds: 4

Events
Singles	Doubles
- Dubai Tennis Championships

John Fitzgerald and Anders Järryd were the defending champions, but Järryd did not compete this year.

Fitzgerald teamed up with Darren Cahill and lost in the final to Todd Woodbridge and Mark Woodforde. The score was 6–7, 6–4, 6–2.

== Seeds ==
1. (Canada) Grant Connell / (United States) Patrick Galbraith (first round)
2. (Australia) Todd Woodbridge / (Australia) Mark Woodforde (champions)
3. (Netherlands) Tom Nijssen / (Czech Republic) Cyril Suk (first round)
4. (Czech Republic) Petr Korda / (South Africa) Gary Muller (first round)

== Draw ==
Key

- Q = Qualifier
- WC = Wild card
- LL = Lucky loser
- Alt = Alternate
- ITF = ITF entry
- PR = Protected ranking
- SR = Special ranking
- SE = Special exempt
- JE = Junior exempt
- JR = Junior Accelerator Programme entrant
- CO = College Accelerator Programme entrant
- NG = Next Gen Accelerator Program entrant
- w/o = Walkover
- r = Retired
- d = Defaulted

=== Draw ===
First round
1	(Canada) G Connell (United States) P Galbraith	2	4
WC	(Italy) A Gaudenzi (Austria) T Muster	6	6
(Australia) D Cahill (Australia) J Fitzgerald	7	2	7
(South Africa) W Ferreira (Spain) J Sánchez	5	6	5
4	(Czech Republic) P Korda (South Africa) G Muller	6	1
(Germany) MK Goellner (Czech Republic) K Nováček	7	6
(Spain) S Casal (Spain) E Sánchez	4	6	4
Q	(South Africa) M Ondruska (Belgium) L Pimek	6	4	6
(Australia) M Kratzmann (Australia) P Rafter	3	6
(United States) B Pearce (United States) D Randall	6	7
(Netherlands) HJ Davids (South Africa) P Norval	6	6
3	(Netherlands) T Nijssen (Czech Republic) C Suk	3	4
(South Africa) JL de Jager (Sweden) H Holm	4	4
(United States) M Briggs (United States) S Melville	6	6
WC	(United States) I Lendl (Canada) G Rusedski	3	5
2	(Australia) T Woodbridge (Australia) M Woodforde	6	7

Quarterfinals
WC	(Italy) A Gaudenzi (Austria) T Muster	2	3
(Australia) D Cahill (Australia) J Fitzgerald	6	6
(Germany) MK Goellner (Czech Republic) K Nováček	7	6
Q	(South Africa) M Ondruska (Belgium) L Pimek	6	3
(United States) B Pearce (United States) D Randall	2	6	7
(Netherlands) HJ Davids (South Africa) P Norval	6	4	6
(United States) M Briggs (United States) S Melville	0	4
2	(Australia) T Woodbridge (Australia) M Woodforde	6	6

Semifinals
(Australia) D Cahill (Australia) J Fitzgerald	6	6
(Germany) MK Goellner (Czech Republic) K Nováček	3	3
(United States) B Pearce (United States) D Randall	3	6	2
2	(Australia) T Woodbridge (Australia) M Woodforde	6	3	6

Final
(Australia) D Cahill (Australia) J Fitzgerald	7	4	2
2	(Australia) T Woodbridge (Australia) M Woodforde	6	6	6
