= 1994 Dubai Open – Singles =

Singles
- 1994 Dubai Tennis Championships

Final
- Champion: (Sweden) Magnus Gustafsson
- Runner-up: (Spain) Sergi Bruguera
- Score: 6–4, 6–2

Details
- Draw: 32
- Seeds: 8

Events
Singles	Doubles
- Dubai Tennis Championships

Magnus Gustafsson defeated Sergi Bruguera 6–4 6–2 to win the 1994 Dubai Tennis Championships singles event. Karel Nováček was the defending champion.

== Seeds ==
1. (Spain) Sergi Bruguera (finalist)
2. (Austria) Thomas Muster (second round)
3. (Czech Republic) Petr Korda (quarterfinals)
4. (Sweden) Magnus Gustafsson (champion)
5. (United States) Ivan Lendl (quarterfinals, retired)
6. (South Africa) Wayne Ferreira (semifinals)
7. (Czech Republic) Karel Nováček (second round)
8. (Russia) Alexander Volkov (semifinals)

== Draws ==
Key

- Q = Qualifier
- WC = Wild card
- LL = Lucky loser
- Alt = Alternate
- ITF = ITF entry
- PR = Protected ranking
- SR = Special ranking
- SE = Special exempt
- JE = Junior exempt
- JR = Junior Accelerator Programme entrant
- CO = College Accelerator Programme entrant
- NG = Next Gen Accelerator Program entrant
- w/o = Walkover
- r = Retired
- d = Defaulted

=== Finals ===
Semifinals
1	(Spain) Sergi Bruguera	6	6
6	(South Africa) Wayne Ferreira	2	1
4	(Sweden) Magnus Gustafsson	6	6
8	(Russia) Alexander Volkov	2	2

Final
1	(Spain) Sergi Bruguera	4	2
4	(Sweden) Magnus Gustafsson	6	6

=== Section 1 ===
First round
1	(Spain) S Bruguera	6	0	6
(Italy) S Pescosolido	1	6	3
WC	(Australia) T Woodbridge	6	7^{7}
(Spain) E Sánchez	2	6^{4}
(Germany) MK Goellner	7^{7}	5	6
Q	(United States) M Blackman	6^{3}	7	3
(South Africa) M Ondruska	2	2
7	(Czech Republic) K Nováček	6	6
3	(Czech Republic) P Korda	4	7	6
(Italy) A Gaudenzi	6	5	2
WC	(Austria) G Schaller	1	4
Q	(Sweden) L Jonsson	6	6
(Sweden) C Bergström	4	2
(Australia) M Woodforde	6	6
(Canada) G Rusedski	4	4
6	(South Africa) W Ferreira	6	6

Second round
1	(Spain) S Bruguera	7^{7}	3	6
WC	(Australia) T Woodbridge	6^{2}	6	1
(Germany) MK Goellner	7	6
7	(Czech Republic) K Nováček	5	3
3	(Czech Republic) P Korda	6	6
Q	(Sweden) L Jonsson	2	4
(Australia) M Woodforde	2	5
6	(South Africa) W Ferreira	6	7

Quarterfinals
1	(Spain) S Bruguera	6	6
(Germany) MK Goellner	4	3
3	(Czech Republic) P Korda	4	6	2
6	(South Africa) W Ferreira	6	3	6

Semifinals
1	(Spain) S Bruguera	6	6
6	(South Africa) W Ferreira	2	1

=== Section 2 ===
First round
5	(United States) I Lendl	6	6
Q	(Germany) C Arriens	1	2
(France) F Santoro	6	1	2
(Russia) A Cherkasov	3	6	6
(Australia) P Rafter	6	2	6
(Morocco) Y El Aynaoui	3	6	3
WC	(Sweden) M Larsson	4	6^{4}
4	(Sweden) M Gustafsson	6	7^{7}
8	(Russia) A Volkov	6	7^{7}
(Australia) J Stoltenberg	4	6^{2}
(Spain) J Burillo	3	2
Q	(Netherlands) HJ Davids	6	6
(Spain) J Sánchez	5	6	1
(Sweden) H Holm	7	4	6
(Australia) D Cahill	5	2
2	(Austria) T Muster	7	6

Second round
5	(United States) I Lendl	6	6
(Russia) A Cherkasov	4	2
(Australia) P Rafter	5	6	3
4	(Sweden) M Gustafsson	7	3	6
8	(Russia) A Volkov	6	3	6
Q	(Netherlands) HJ Davids	2	6	2
(Sweden) H Holm	6	6
2	(Austria) T Muster	3	4

Quarterfinals
5	(United States) I Lendl	6	2	1^{r}
4	(Sweden) M Gustafsson	4	6	3
8	(Russia) A Volkov	6	0	7
(Sweden) H Holm	4	6	5

Semifinals
4	(Sweden) M Gustafsson	6	6
8	(Russia) A Volkov	2	2
