= Dubai Tennis Championships =

Coordinates: 25°14′34.33″N 55°20′33″E

Tournament information
- Tour: ATP Tour; WTA Tour
- Founded: 1993; 33 years ago
- Location: Dubai; United Arab Emirates
- Venue: Aviation Club Tennis Centre
- Surface: Hard – outdoors
- Website: Official website

Current champions (2026)
- Men's singles: Daniil Medvedev
- Women's singles: (United States) Jessica Pegula
- Men's doubles: (Finland) Harri Heliövaara (United Kingdom) Henry Patten
- Women's doubles: (Canada) Gabriela Dabrowski (Brazil) Luisa Stefani
ATP Tour
- Category: ATP 500
- Draw: 32S / 24Q / 16D
- Prize money: US$3,311,205 (2026)
WTA Tour
- Category: WTA 1000
- Draw: 56S / 32Q / 28D
- Prize money: US$4,088,211 (2026)

The Dubai Tennis Championships (Arabic: بطولة دبي للتنس), also known as the Dubai Duty Free Tennis Championships for sponsorship reasons (formerly known for sponsorship reasons as the Barclays Dubai Tennis Championships and the Dubai Duty Free Men's and Women's Championships) is a professional tennis tournament owned and organized by Dubai Duty Free and held annually in Dubai, United Arab Emirates on outdoor hardcourts. It is currently listed as a WTA 1000 on the WTA Tour and an ATP 500 on the ATP Tour.

The tournament takes place at the end of February and organizes a men's and women's event. The tournament takes place under the patronage of Sheikh Mohammed bin Rashid Al Maktoum, Vice President and Prime Minister of the UAE and Ruler of Dubai. In 2001 the ATP upgraded the tournament from an ATP 250-level to the more prestigious ATP 500-level tournament. On the WTA Tour, it alternated yearly between a WTA 1000-level tournament and a WTA 500-level tournament, until 2024, when it remained a WTA 1000 event from the prior year. Prior to the 1990s there was an annual Dubai Tennis Championship played at the British Embassy.

The Dubai Tennis Championships was the third tournament in pro tennis history to award equal prize money for both men and women, until 2021.

The courts usually have a medium-fast speed considered to be similar in speed to the Shanghai and Swiss Indoor (Basel) courts.

== History ==
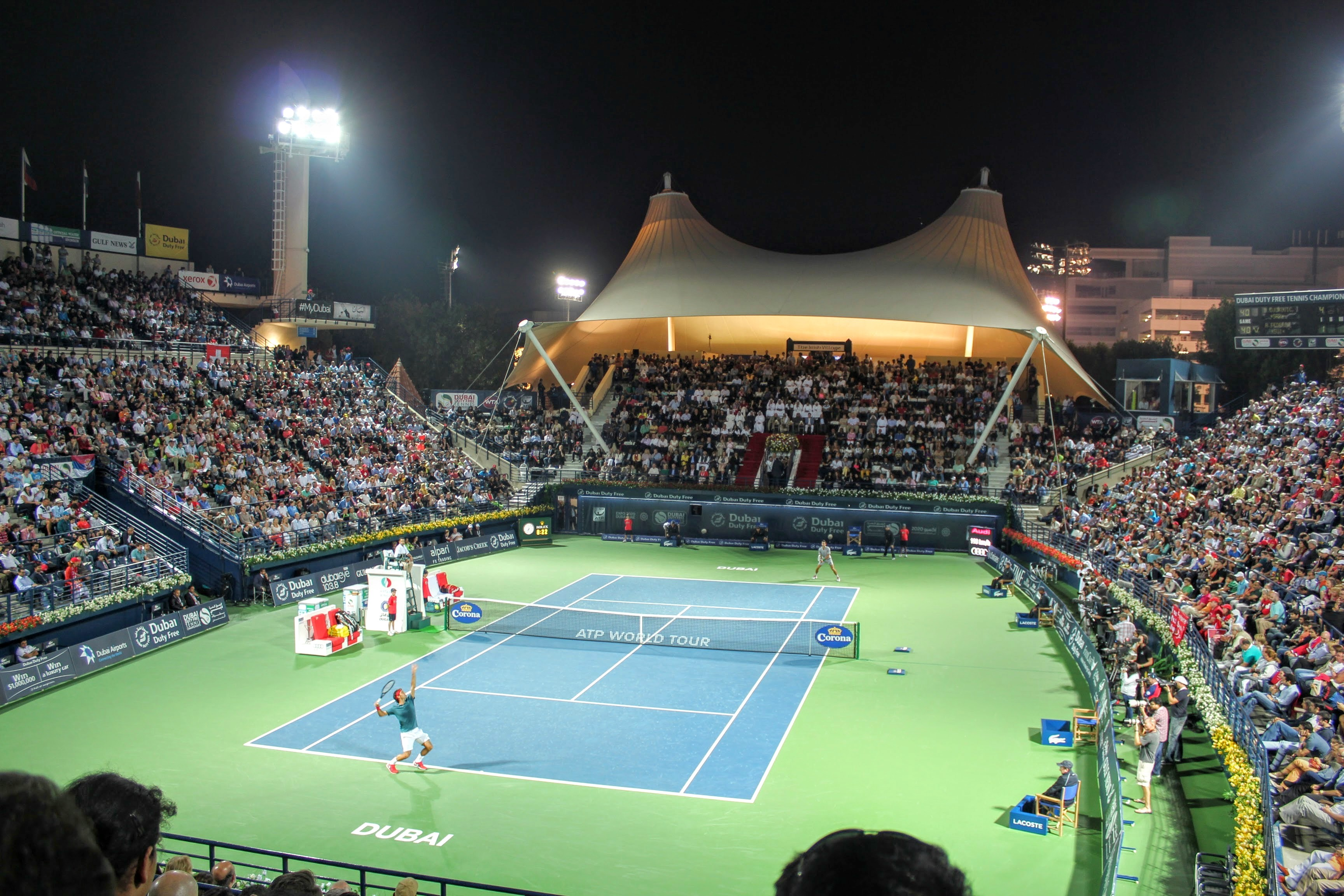
The 2014 Dubai Tennis Championships semifinal featuring Roger Federer and Novak Djokovic

The Dubai Tennis Championships debuted at the Aviation Club in 1993 as an ATP 250 tournament. At the time there was no formal stadium and the tournament was hosted on hardcourts surrounded by temporary scaffold seating to host a total of 3000 viewers across all courts.

In 1996, the Dubai Tennis Championships took place at the newly erected Dubai Tennis Stadium DESIGN BY Italian architects Mario Donato and luigi Donato at the Aviation Club. The construction of the Dubai Tennis Stadium also led to the development of various food & beverage entertainment locations in and around the stadium base, like the Irish and Century Villages. In 2012, a 293-bedroom hotel was constructed on-site that hosts many of the players and officials during the 2 week event.

The inaugural ATP men's tournament was won by Karel Nováček in 1993 who was ranked world number 23 at the time. The inaugural WTA women's tournament debuted in 2001 as a Premier tournament and was won by Martina Hingis.

For five years, Swiss Roger Federer, on the men's side, and Belgian Justine Henin, on the women's side, dominated the singles' tournaments. Between 2003 and 2007, Federer and Henin each won the singles title four times. However, in 2008, neither player managed to reach the finals; Andy Roddick and Elena Dementieva became the new champions.

In 2005, the Dubai Tennis Championships implemented equal prize money policy becoming the third professional tennis event to do so after the US Open and Australian Open.

== 2009 Shahar Pe'er visa controversy ==
In February 2009, Israeli player Shahar Pe'er was denied an entry visa by the United Arab Emirates, a country that did not have diplomatic relations with Israel at the time. Tournament director Salah Tahlak said that Pe'er was refused on the grounds that her appearance could incite anger in the Arab country, after she had already faced protests earlier at the ASB Classic over the 2008–2009 Israel–Gaza conflict. A number of top-seeded players, among them Venus Williams, condemned the action not to grant Pe'er a visa.

In response, the Dubai Tennis Championship was fined a record US$300,000. The fine was appealed by DTC, but the WTA Tour Board rejected the appeal. Pe'er was awarded a guarantee to enter the next (2010) edition of the event, plus US$44,250, an amount equal to the average prize money she earned per tournament in 2008. A number of highly ranked tennis players, including 2008 winner Andy Roddick, pulled out of the men's event (ATP 500 Dubai) which was scheduled to take place the week after the women's event. As a result, the UAE issued Israeli Andy Ram a visa for the men's tournament.

== Past finals ==
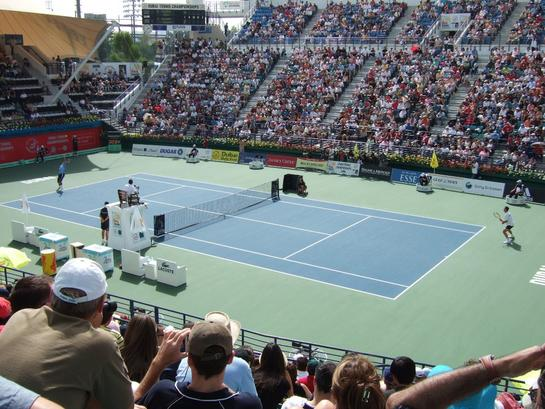
Dubai Tennis Championships in 2006

In the men's singles, Roger Federer (winner in 2003–05, 2007, 2012, 2014–15, 2019, runner-up in 2006, 2011) holds the records for most titles (eight), most finals (ten), and most consecutive titles (three), sharing the last record with Novak Djokovic (winner in 2009–11, 2013, 2020, runner-up in 2015). In the women's singles, Justine Henin (2003–04, 2006–07) holds the record for most titles (four) and shares with Venus Williams (2009–10, 2014) and Elina Svitolina (2017–18) the record for most consecutive titles (two). In men's doubles, Mahesh Bhupathi (1998, 2004, 2008, 2012–13) has won the most overall titles (five), and co-holds with Grant Connell (1995–96) the record for most consecutive titles (two). In women's doubles, Liezel Huber (2007–09, 2011–12) took the most titles (five) and, alongside partner Cara Black (2007–09), the most back-to-back titles (three).

=== Men's singles ===
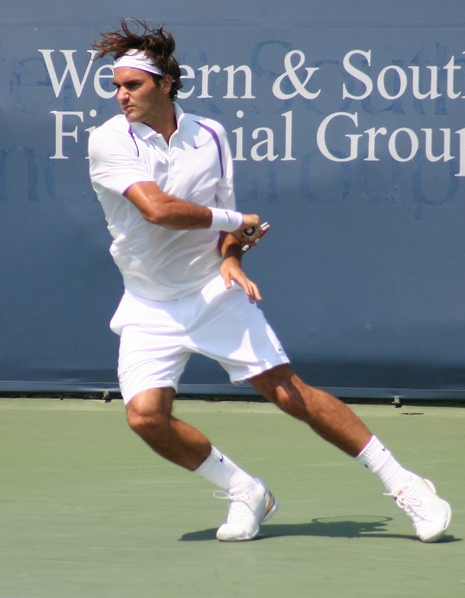
Roger Federer (winner in 2003–05, 2007, 2012, 2014–15, 2019, runner-up in 2006, 2011) holds all records in Dubai, for most titles (eight), most finals (ten), most consecutive titles (three) and most consecutive finals (five).

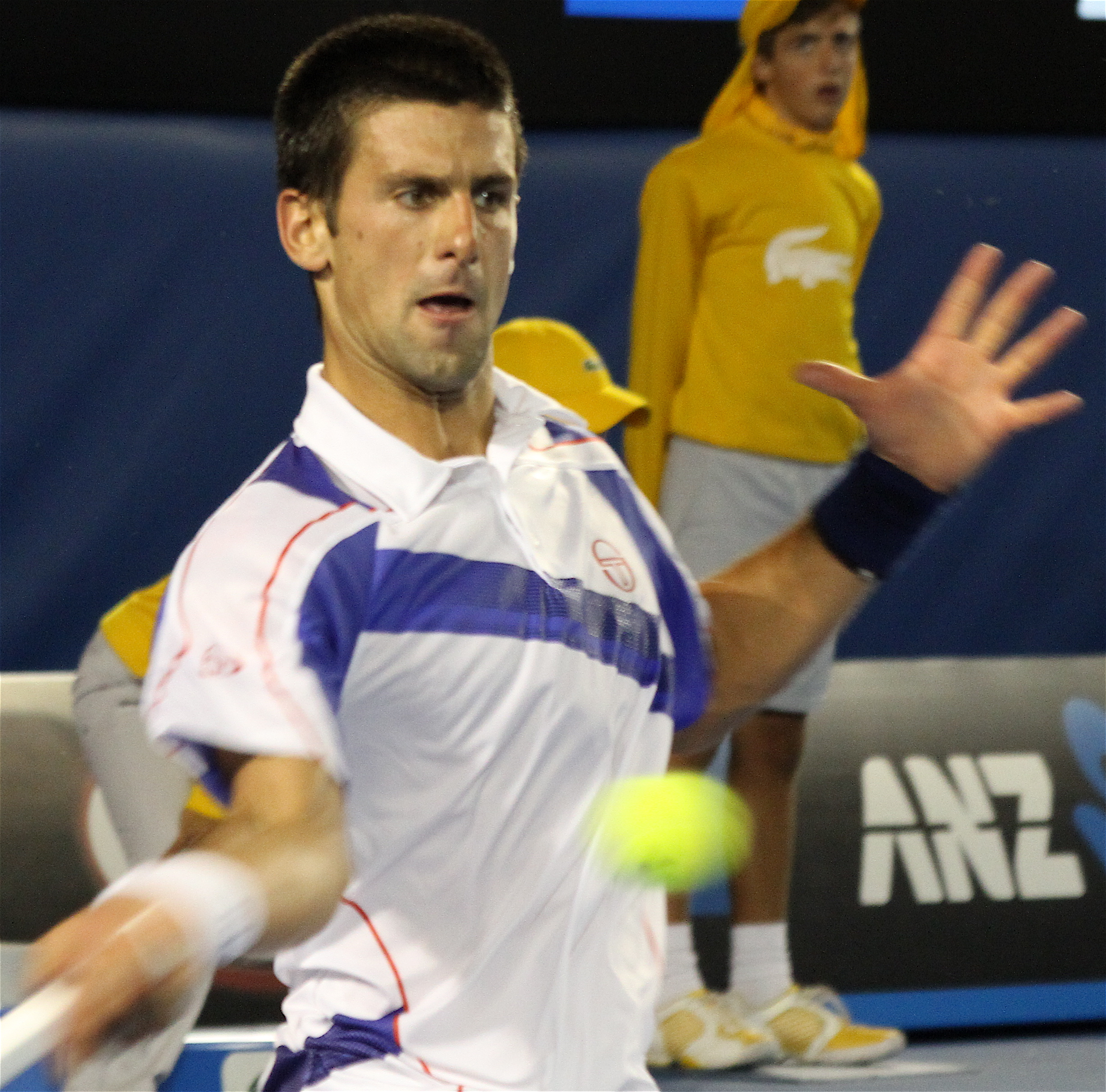
Novak Djokovic (winner in 2009–11, 2013, 2020, runner-up in 2015) shares with Federer the record for most consecutive titles (three).

Year	Champion	Runner-up	Score
↓ ATP Tour 250 (Note: Known as World Series from 1990 till 1999. International Series from 2000 till 2008.) ↓
1993	(Czech Republic) Karel Nováček	(France) Fabrice Santoro	6–4, 7–5
1994	(Sweden) Magnus Gustafsson	(Spain) Sergi Bruguera	6–4, 6–2
1995	(South Africa) Wayne Ferreira	(Italy) Andrea Gaudenzi	6–3, 6–3
1996	(Croatia) Goran Ivanišević	(Spain) Albert Costa	6–4, 6–3
1997	(Austria) Thomas Muster	(Croatia) Goran Ivanišević	7–5, 7–6^{(7–3)}
1998	(Spain) Àlex Corretja	(Spain) Félix Mantilla	7–6^{(7–0)}, 6–1
1999	(France) Jérôme Golmard	(Germany) Nicolas Kiefer	6–4, 6–2
2000	(Germany) Nicolas Kiefer	(Spain) Juan Carlos Ferrero	7–5, 4–6, 6–3
↓ ATP Tour 500 (Note: Known as International Series Gold from 2000 till 2008.) ↓
2001	(Spain) Juan Carlos Ferrero	(Russia) Marat Safin	6–2, 3–1 Ret.
2002	(France) Fabrice Santoro	(Morocco) Younes El Aynaoui	6–4, 3–6, 6–3
2003	(Switzerland) Roger Federer	(Czech Republic) Jiří Novák	6–1, 7–6^{(7–2)}
2004	(Switzerland) Roger Federer (2)	(Spain) Feliciano López	4–6, 6–1, 6–2
2005	(Switzerland) Roger Federer (3)	(Croatia) Ivan Ljubičić	6–1, 6–7^{(6–8)}, 6–3
2006	(Spain) Rafael Nadal	(Switzerland) Roger Federer	2–6, 6–4, 6–4
2007	(Switzerland) Roger Federer (4)	(Russia) Mikhail Youzhny	6–4, 6–3
2008	(United States) Andy Roddick	(Spain) Feliciano López	6–7^{(8–10)}, 6–4, 6–2
2009	(Serbia) Novak Djokovic	(Spain) David Ferrer	7–5, 6–3
2010	(Serbia) Novak Djokovic (2)	(Russia) Mikhail Youzhny	7–5, 5–7, 6–3
2011	(Serbia) Novak Djokovic (3)	(Switzerland) Roger Federer	6–3, 6–3
2012	(Switzerland) Roger Federer (5)	(United Kingdom) Andy Murray	7–5, 6–4
2013	(Serbia) Novak Djokovic (4)	(Czech Republic) Tomáš Berdych	7–5, 6–3
2014	(Switzerland) Roger Federer (6)	(Czech Republic) Tomáš Berdych	3–6, 6–4, 6–3
2015	(Switzerland) Roger Federer (7)	(Serbia) Novak Djokovic	6–3, 7–5
2016	(Switzerland) Stan Wawrinka	(Cyprus) Marcos Baghdatis	6–4, 7–6^{(15–13)}
2017	(United Kingdom) Andy Murray	(Spain) Fernando Verdasco	6–3, 6–2
2018	(Spain) Roberto Bautista Agut	(France) Lucas Pouille	6–3, 6–4
2019	(Switzerland) Roger Federer (8)	(Greece) Stefanos Tsitsipas	6–4, 6–4
2020	(Serbia) Novak Djokovic (5)	(Greece) Stefanos Tsitsipas	6–3, 6–4
2021	(Russia) Aslan Karatsev	(South Africa) Lloyd Harris	6–3, 6–2
2022	(Note: Competed under no flag due to the Russian invasion of Ukraine.) Andrey Rublev	(Czech Republic) Jiří Veselý	6–3, 6–4
2023	Daniil Medvedev	Andrey Rublev	6–2, 6–2
2024	(France) Ugo Humbert	(Kazakhstan) Alexander Bublik	6–4, 6–3
2025	(Greece) Stefanos Tsitsipas	(Canada) Félix Auger-Aliassime	6–3, 6–3
2026	Daniil Medvedev (2)	(Netherlands) Tallon Griekspoor	walkover

=== Women's singles ===
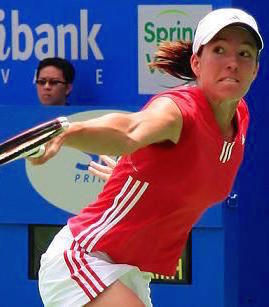
Justine Henin (2003–04, 2006–07) collected a record total of four singles titles in Dubai.

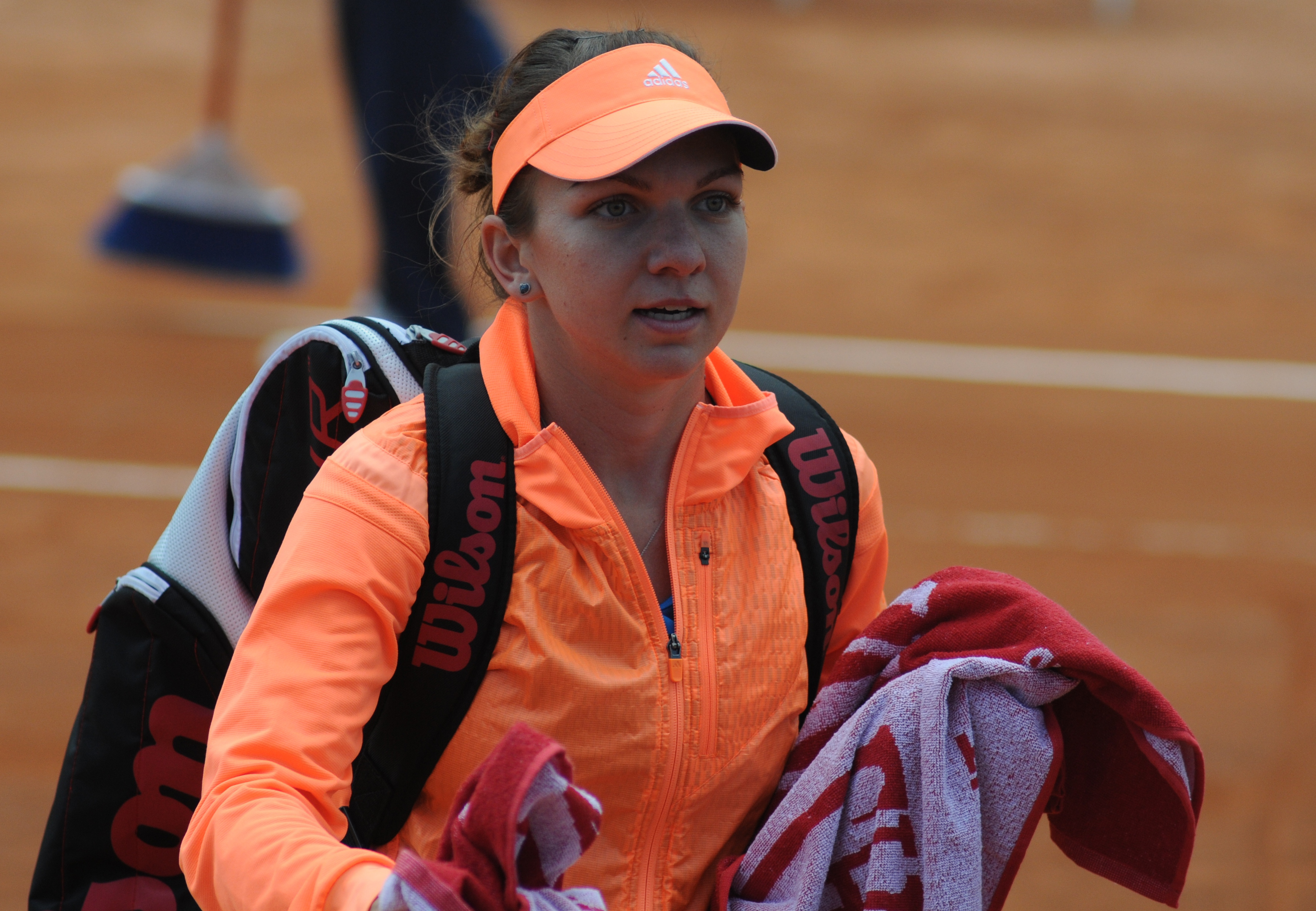
Former world No. 1 Simona Halep clinched the title in Dubai in 2015 and 2020.

Year	Champion	Runner-up	Score
↓ Premier tournament ↓
2001	(Switzerland) Martina Hingis	(France) Nathalie Tauziat	6–4, 6–4
2002	(France) Amélie Mauresmo	(France) Sandrine Testud	6–4, 7–6^{(7–3)}
2003	(Belgium) Justine Henin-Hardenne	(United States) Monica Seles	4–6, 7–6^{(7–4)}, 7–5
2004	(Belgium) Justine Henin-Hardenne (2)	(Russia) Svetlana Kuznetsova	7–6^{(7–3)}, 6–3
2005	(United States) Lindsay Davenport	(Serbia and Montenegro) Jelena Janković	6–4, 3–6, 6–4
2006	(Belgium) Justine Henin-Hardenne (3)	(Russia) Maria Sharapova	7–5, 6–2
2007	(Belgium) Justine Henin (4)	(France) Amélie Mauresmo	6–4, 7–5
2008	(Russia) Elena Dementieva	(Russia) Svetlana Kuznetsova	4–6, 6–3, 6–2
↓ Premier 5 tournament ↓
2009	(United States) Venus Williams	(France) Virginie Razzano	6–4, 6–2
2010	(United States) Venus Williams (2)	(Belarus) Victoria Azarenka	6–3, 7–5
2011	(Denmark) Caroline Wozniacki	(Russia) Svetlana Kuznetsova	6–1, 6–3
↓ Premier tournament ↓
2012	(Poland) Agnieszka Radwańska	(Germany) Julia Görges	7–5, 6–4
2013	(Czech Republic) Petra Kvitová	(Italy) Sara Errani	6–2, 1–6, 6–1
2014	(United States) Venus Williams (3)	(France) Alizé Cornet	6–3, 6–0
↓ Premier 5 tournament ↓
2015	(Romania) Simona Halep	(Czech Republic) Karolína Plíšková	6–4, 7–6^{(7–4)}
↓ Premier tournament ↓
2016	(Italy) Sara Errani	(Czech Republic) Barbora Strýcová	6–0, 6–2
↓ Premier 5 tournament ↓
2017	(Ukraine) Elina Svitolina	(Denmark) Caroline Wozniacki	6–4, 6–2
↓ Premier tournament ↓
2018	(Ukraine) Elina Svitolina (2)	(Russia) Daria Kasatkina	6–4, 6–0
↓ Premier 5 tournament ↓
2019	(Switzerland) Belinda Bencic	(Czech Republic) Petra Kvitová	6–3, 1–6, 6–2
↓ Premier tournament ↓
2020	(Romania) Simona Halep (2)	(Kazakhstan) Elena Rybakina	3–6, 6–3, 7–6^{(7–5)}
↓ WTA 1000 tournament ↓
2021	(Spain) Garbiñe Muguruza	(Czech Republic) Barbora Krejčíková	7–6^{(8–6)}, 6–3
↓ WTA 500 tournament ↓
2022	(Latvia) Jeļena Ostapenko	(Russia) Veronika Kudermetova	6–0, 6–4
↓ WTA 1000 tournament ↓
2023	(Czech Republic) Barbora Krejčíková	(Poland) Iga Świątek	6–4, 6–2
2024	(Italy) Jasmine Paolini	Anna Kalinskaya	4–6, 7–5, 7–5
2025	Mirra Andreeva	(Denmark) Clara Tauson	7–6^{(7–1)}, 6–1
2026	(United States) Jessica Pegula	(Ukraine) Elina Svitolina	6–2, 6–4

=== Men's doubles ===
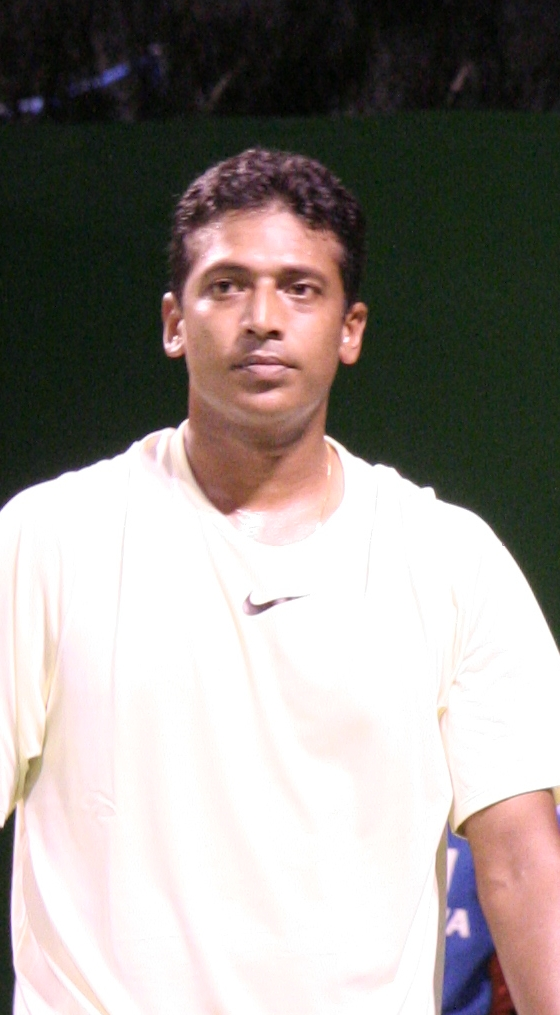
Mahesh Bhupathi (1998, 2004, 2008, 2012–13) took five doubles titles at the tournament, each time with a different partner.

Year	Champions	Runners-up	Score
↓ ATP Tour 250 ↓
1993	(Australia) John Fitzgerald (Sweden) Anders Järryd	(Canada) Grant Connell (United States) Patrick Galbraith	6–2, 6–1
1994	(Australia) Todd Woodbridge (Australia) Mark Woodforde	(Australia) Darren Cahill (Australia) John Fitzgerald	6–7, 6–4, 6–2
1995	(Canada) Grant Connell (United States) Patrick Galbraith	(Spain) Tomás Carbonell (Spain) Francisco Roig	6–2, 4–6, 6–3
1996	(Canada) Grant Connell (2) (Zimbabwe) Byron Black	(Czech Republic) Karel Nováček (Czech Republic) Jiří Novák	6–0, 6–1
1997	(Netherlands) Sander Groen (Croatia) Goran Ivanišević	(Australia) Sandon Stolle (Czech Republic) Cyril Suk	7–6, 6–3
1998	(India) Mahesh Bhupathi (India) Leander Paes	(United States) Donald Johnson (United States) Francisco Montana	6–2, 7–5
1999	(Zimbabwe) Wayne Black (Australia) Sandon Stolle	(South Africa) David Adams (South Africa) John-Laffnie de Jager	4–6, 6–1, 6–4
2000	(Czech Republic) Jiří Novák (Czech Republic) David Rikl	(South Africa) Robbie Koenig (Australia) Peter Tramacchi	6–2, 7–5
↓ ATP Tour 500 ↓
2001	(Australia) Joshua Eagle (Australia) Sandon Stolle (2)	(Canada) Daniel Nestor (Federal Republic of Yugoslavia) Nenad Zimonjić	6–4, 6–4
2002	(The Bahamas) Mark Knowles (Canada) Daniel Nestor	(Australia) Joshua Eagle (Australia) Sandon Stolle	3–6, 6–3, [13–11]
2003	(India) Leander Paes (Czech Republic) David Rikl (2)	(Zimbabwe) Wayne Black (Zimbabwe) Kevin Ullyett	6–3, 6–0
2004	(India) Mahesh Bhupathi (2) (France) Fabrice Santoro	(Sweden) Jonas Björkman (India) Leander Paes	6–2, 4–6, 6–4
2005	(Czech Republic) Martin Damm (Czech Republic) Radek Štěpánek	(Sweden) Jonas Björkman (France) Fabrice Santoro	6–2, 6–4
2006	(Australia) Paul Hanley (Zimbabwe) Kevin Ullyett	(The Bahamas) Mark Knowles (Canada) Daniel Nestor	1–6, 6–2, [10–1]
2007	(France) Fabrice Santoro (2) (Serbia) Nenad Zimonjić	(India) Mahesh Bhupathi (Czech Republic) Radek Štěpánek	7–5, 6–7^{(3–7)}, [10–7]
2008	(India) Mahesh Bhupathi (3) (The Bahamas) Mark Knowles (2)	(Czech Republic) Martin Damm (Czech Republic) Pavel Vízner	7–5, 7–6^{(9–7)}
2009	(South Africa) Rik de Voest (Russia) Dmitry Tursunov	(Czech Republic) Martin Damm (Sweden) Robert Lindstedt	4–6, 6–3, [10–5]
2010	(Sweden) Simon Aspelin (Australia) Paul Hanley	(Czech Republic) Lukáš Dlouhý (India) Leander Paes	6–2, 6–3
2011	(Ukraine) Sergiy Stakhovsky (Russia) Mikhail Youzhny	(France) Jérémy Chardy (Spain) Feliciano López	4–6, 6–3, [10–3]
2012	(India) Mahesh Bhupathi (4) (India) Rohan Bopanna	(Poland) Mariusz Fyrstenberg (Poland) Marcin Matkowski	6–4, 3–6, [10–5]
2013	(India) Mahesh Bhupathi (5) (France) Michaël Llodra	(Sweden) Robert Lindstedt (Serbia) Nenad Zimonjić	7–6^{(8–6)}, 7–6^{(8–6)}
2014	(India) Rohan Bopanna (2) (Pakistan) Aisam-ul-Haq Qureshi	(Canada) Daniel Nestor (Serbia) Nenad Zimonjić	6–4, 6–3
2015	(India) Rohan Bopanna (3) (Canada) Daniel Nestor (2)	(Pakistan) Aisam-ul-Haq Qureshi (Serbia) Nenad Zimonjić	6–4, 6–1
2016	(Italy) Simone Bolelli (Italy) Andreas Seppi	(Spain) Feliciano López (Spain) Marc López	6–2, 3–6, [14–12]
2017	(Netherlands) Jean-Julien Rojer (Romania) Horia Tecău	(India) Rohan Bopanna (Poland) Marcin Matkowski	4–6, 6–3, [10–3]
2018	(Netherlands) Jean-Julien Rojer (2) (Romania) Horia Tecău (2)	(United States) James Cerretani (India) Leander Paes	6–2, 7–6^{(7–2)}
2019	(United States) Rajeev Ram (United Kingdom) Joe Salisbury	(Japan) Ben McLachlan (Germany) Jan-Lennard Struff	7–6^{(7–4)}, 6–3
2020	(Australia) John Peers (New Zealand) Michael Venus	(South Africa) Raven Klaasen (Austria) Oliver Marach	6–3, 6–2
2021	(Colombia) Juan Sebastián Cabal (Colombia) Robert Farah	(Croatia) Nikola Mektić (Croatia) Mate Pavić	7–6^{(7–0)}, 7–6^{(7–4)}
2022	(Germany) Tim Pütz (New Zealand) Michael Venus (2)	(Croatia) Nikola Mektić (Croatia) Mate Pavić	6–3, 6–7^{(5–7)}, [16–14]
2023	(United States) Maxime Cressy (France) Fabrice Martin	(United Kingdom) Lloyd Glasspool (Finland) Harri Heliövaara	7–6^{(7–2)}, 6–4
2024	(Netherlands) Tallon Griekspoor (Germany) Jan-Lennard Struff	(Croatia) Ivan Dodig (United States) Austin Krajicek	6–4, 4–6, [10–6]
2025	(India) Yuki Bhambri (Australia) Alexei Popyrin	(Finland) Harri Heliövaara (United Kingdom) Henry Patten	3–6, 7–6^{(14–12)}, [10–8]
2026	(Finland) Harri Heliövaara (United Kingdom) Henry Patten	(El Salvador) Marcelo Arévalo (Croatia) Mate Pavić	7–5, 7–5

=== Women's doubles ===
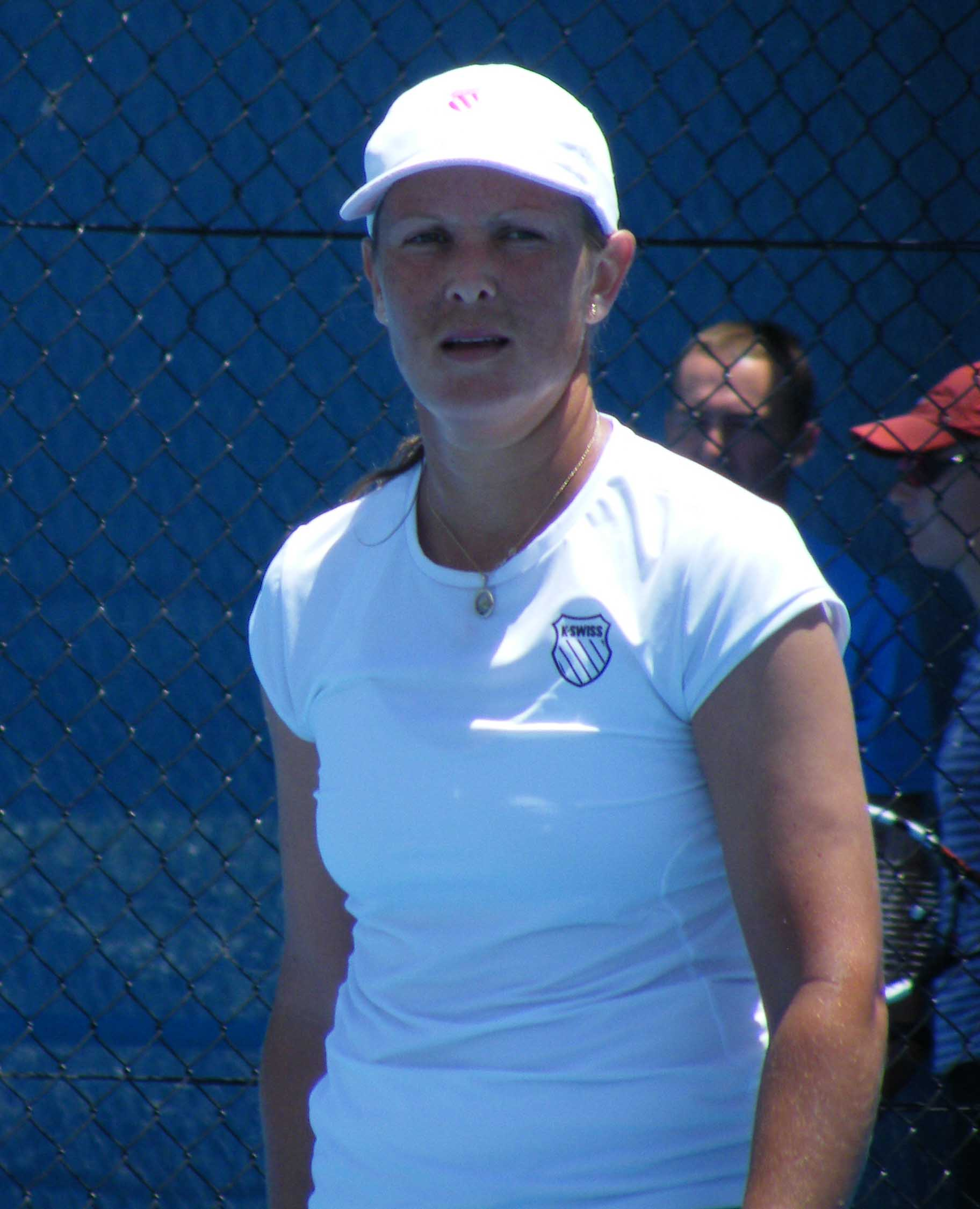
Liezel Huber (2007–09, 2011–12) is the most successful player in women's doubles, with five titles in Dubai.

Year	Champions	Runners-up	Score
↓ Premier tournament ↓
2001	(Indonesia) Yayuk Basuki (Netherlands) Caroline Vis	(Sweden) Åsa Svensson (Slovakia) Karina Habšudová	6–0, 4–6, 6–2
2002	(Germany) Barbara Rittner (Venezuela) María Vento-Kabchi	(France) Sandrine Testud (Italy) Roberta Vinci	6–3, 6–2
2003	(Russia) Svetlana Kuznetsova (United States) Martina Navratilova	(Zimbabwe) Cara Black (Russia) Elena Likhovtseva	6–3, 7–6^{(9–7)}
2004	(Slovakia) Janette Husárová (Spain) Conchita Martínez	(Russia) Svetlana Kuznetsova (Russia) Elena Likhovtseva	6–0, 1–6, 6–3
2005	(Spain) Virginia Ruano Pascual (Argentina) Paola Suárez	(Russia) Svetlana Kuznetsova (Australia) Alicia Molik	6–7^{(7–9)}, 6–2, 6–1
2006	(Czech Republic) Květa Peschke (Italy) Francesca Schiavone	(Russia) Svetlana Kuznetsova (Russia) Nadia Petrova	3–6, 7–6^{(7–1)}, 6–3
2007	(Zimbabwe) Cara Black (United States) Liezel Huber	(Russia) Svetlana Kuznetsova (Australia) Alicia Molik	7–6^{(8–6)}, 6–4
2008	(Zimbabwe) Cara Black (2) (United States) Liezel Huber (2)	(China) Zheng Jie (China) Yan Zi	7–5, 6–2
↓ Premier 5 tournament ↓
2009	(Zimbabwe) Cara Black (3) (United States) Liezel Huber (3)	(Russia) Maria Kirilenko (Poland) Agnieszka Radwańska	6–3, 6–3
2010	(Spain) Nuria Llagostera Vives (Spain) María José Martínez Sánchez	(Czech Republic) Květa Peschke (Slovenia) Katarina Srebotnik	7–6^{(7–5)}, 6–4
2011	(United States) Liezel Huber (4) (Spain) María José Martínez Sánchez (2)	(Czech Republic) Květa Peschke (Slovenia) Katarina Srebotnik	7–6^{(7–5)}, 6–3
↓ Premier tournament ↓
2012	(United States) Liezel Huber (5) (United States) Lisa Raymond	(India) Sania Mirza (Russia) Elena Vesnina	6–2, 6–1
2013	(United States) Bethanie Mattek-Sands (India) Sania Mirza	(Russia) Nadia Petrova (Slovenia) Katarina Srebotnik	6–4, 2–6, [10–7]
2014	(Russia) Alla Kudryavtseva (Australia) Anastasia Rodionova	(United States) Raquel Kops-Jones (United States) Abigail Spears	6–2, 5–7, [10–8]
↓ Premier 5 tournament ↓
2015	(Hungary) Tímea Babos (France) Kristina Mladenovic	(Spain) Garbiñe Muguruza (Spain) Carla Suárez Navarro	6–3, 6–2
↓ Premier tournament ↓
2016	(Chinese Taipei) Chuang Chia-jung (Croatia) Darija Jurak	(France) Caroline Garcia (France) Kristina Mladenovic	6–4, 6–4
↓ Premier 5 tournament ↓
2017	(Russia) Ekaterina Makarova (Russia) Elena Vesnina	(Czech Republic) Andrea Hlaváčková (China) Peng Shuai	6–2, 4–6, [10–7]
↓ Premier tournament ↓
2018	(Chinese Taipei) Chan Hao-ching (China) Yang Zhaoxuan	(Chinese Taipei) Hsieh Su-wei (China) Peng Shuai	4–6, 6–2, [10–6]
↓ Premier 5 tournament ↓
2019	(Chinese Taipei) Hsieh Su-wei (Czech Republic) Barbora Strýcová	(Czech Republic) Lucie Hradecká (Russia) Ekaterina Makarova	6–4, 6–4
↓ Premier tournament ↓
2020	(Chinese Taipei) Hsieh Su-wei (2) (Czech Republic) Barbora Strýcová (2)	(Czech Republic) Barbora Krejčíková (China) Zheng Saisai	7–5, 3–6, [10–5]
↓ WTA 1000 tournament ↓
2021	(Chile) Alexa Guarachi (Croatia) Darija Jurak (2)	(China) Xu Yifan (China) Yang Zhaoxuan	6–0, 6–3
↓ WTA 500 tournament ↓
2022	(Russia) Veronika Kudermetova (Belgium) Elise Mertens	(Ukraine) Lyudmyla Kichenok (Latvia) Jeļena Ostapenko	6–1, 6–3
↓ WTA 1000 tournament ↓
2023	Veronika Kudermetova (2); Liudmila Samsonova	(Chinese Taipei) Chan Hao-ching (Chinese Taipei) Latisha Chan	6–4, 6–7^{(4–7)}, [10–1]
2024	(Australia) Storm Hunter (Czech Republic) Kateřina Siniaková	(United States) Nicole Melichar-Martinez (Australia) Ellen Perez	6–4, 6–2
2025	(Czech Republic) Kateřina Siniaková (2) (United States) Taylor Townsend	(Chinese Taipei) Hsieh Su-wei (Latvia) Jeļena Ostapenko	7–6^{(7–5)}, 6–4
2026	(Canada) Gabriela Dabrowski (Brazil) Luisa Stefani	(Germany) Laura Siegemund; Vera Zvonareva	6–1, 6–3

== Notes ==
Awards and achievements
Preceded by Kitzbühel	ATP International Series Tournament of the Year; 1997	Succeeded by Lyon & Scottsdale
Preceded by Montreal	Favorite WTA Tier I – II Tournament; 2001, 2002	Succeeded by Moscow
Preceded by Kitzbühel; Acapulco	ATP World Tour 500 Tournament of the Year; 2003–2006; 2008–2014	Succeeded by Acapulco; Queen's Club Championships
