= 2007 Qatar Open – Doubles =

Doubles
- 2007 Qatar Open

Final
- Champions: (Russia) Mikhail Youzhny (Serbia) Nenad Zimonjić
- Runners-up: (Czech Republic) Martin Damm (India) Leander Paes
- Score: 6–1, 7–6^{(7–3)}

Details
- Draw: 16
- Seeds: 4

Events
Singles	Doubles
← 2006 ·	ATP Qatar Open	· 2008 →

Mikhail Youzhny and Nenad Zimonjić defeated Martin Damm and Leander Paes 6–1, 7–6 (3) to win the 2007 Qatar ExxonMobil Open doubles event.

== Seeds ==
1. (Sweden) Jonas Björkman / (Belarus) Max Mirnyi (first round)
2. (The Bahamas) Mark Knowles / (Canada) Daniel Nestor (semifinals)
3. (Czech Republic) Martin Damm / (India) Leander Paes (finals)
4. (Poland) Mariusz Fyrstenberg / (Poland) Marcin Matkowski (quarterfinals)

== Draw ==
=== Key ===
- Q = Qualifier
- WC = Wild card
- LL = Lucky loser
- Alt = Alternate
- ITF = ITF entry
- PR = Protected ranking
- SR = Special ranking
- SE = Special exempt
- JE = Junior exempt
- JR = Junior Accelerator Programme entrant
- CO = College Accelerator Programme entrant
- NG = Next Gen Accelerator Program entrant
- w/o = Walkover
- r = Retired
- d = Defaulted

=== Draw ===
First round
1	(Sweden) J Björkman (Belarus) M Mirnyi	6	3	[7]
(Germany) P Kohlschreiber (Sweden) R Söderling	1	6	[10]
(Russia) M Youzhny (Serbia) N Zimonjić	6	7
(Spain) R Ramírez Hidalgo (Italy) F Volandri	3	5
4	(Poland) M Fyrstenberg (Poland) M Matkowski	4	6	[10]
(Czech Republic) F Čermák (Czech Republic) J Levinský	6	4	[6]
(Cyprus) M Baghdatis (Switzerland) S Wawrinka	6	1	[5]
(United Kingdom) A Murray (United Kingdom) J Murray	4	6	[10]
WC	(Belgium) O Rochus (Belgium) K Vliegen	6	6^{3}	[10]
(Spain) N Almagro (Spain) A Martín	3	7^{7}	[8]
WC	(Morocco) Y El Aynaoui (Qatar) S Khalfan	2	1
3	(Czech Republic) M Damm (India) L Paes	6	6
(Sweden) T Johansson (Croatia) I Ljubičić	4	6	[8]
(France) G Monfils (France) S Grosjean	6	1	[10]
(Austria) J Melzer (Austria) J Knowle	4	4
2	(The Bahamas) M Knowles (Canada) D Nestor	6	6

Quarterfinals
(Germany) P Kohlschreiber (Sweden) R Söderling	6	3	[7]
(Russia) M Youzhny (Serbia) N Zimonjić	4	6	[10]
4	(Poland) M Fyrstenberg (Poland) M Matkowski	6	2	[9]
(United Kingdom) A Murray (United Kingdom) J Murray	4	6	[11]
WC	(Belgium) O Rochus (Belgium) K Vliegen	3	1
3	(Czech Republic) M Damm (India) L Paes	6	6
(France) G Monfils (France) S Grosjean	3	0
2	(The Bahamas) M Knowles (Canada) D Nestor	6	6

Semifinals
(Russia) M Youzhny (Serbia) N Zimonjić	6	6
(United Kingdom) A Murray (United Kingdom) J Murray	3	4
3	(Czech Republic) M Damm (India) L Paes	7	6^{6}	[10]
2	(The Bahamas) M Knowles (Canada) D Nestor	5	7^{8}	[2]

Final
(Russia) M Youzhny (Serbia) N Zimonjić	6	7^{7}
3	(Czech Republic) M Damm (India) L Paes	1	6^{3}
