= 2010 Dubai Tennis Championships – Women's singles =

Women's singles
- 2010 Dubai Tennis Championships

Final
- Champion: (United States) Venus Williams
- Runner-up: (Belarus) Victoria Azarenka
- Score: 6–3, 7–5

Details
- Draw: 56
- Seeds: 18

Events
Singles	men	women
Doubles	men	women
- Dubai Tennis Championships

Defending champion Venus Williams defeated Victoria Azarenka in the final, 6–3, 7–5 to win the women's singles tennis title at the 2010 Dubai Tennis Championships.

== Seeds ==
The top eight seeds receive a bye into the second round.

1. (Denmark) Caroline Wozniacki (third round)
2. (Russia) Svetlana Kuznetsova (third round)
3. (United States) Venus Williams (champion)
4. (Belarus) Victoria Azarenka (final)
5. (Russia) Elena Dementieva (second round, retired due to a right shoulder injury)
6. (Serbia) Jelena Janković (third round)
7. (Poland) Agnieszka Radwańska (semifinals)
8. (China) Li Na (quarterfinals, retired due to a right back injury)
9. (Australia) Samantha Stosur (first round)
10. (Italy) Flavia Pennetta (third round)
11. (France) Marion Bartoli (third round)
12. (Russia) Vera Zvonareva (quarterfinals)
13. (Belgium) Yanina Wickmayer (first round)
14. (Italy) Francesca Schiavone (second round)
15. (Russia) Nadia Petrova (first round)
16. (China) Zheng Jie (first round)

== Draw ==
Key

- Q = Qualifier
- WC = Wild card
- LL = Lucky loser
- Alt = Alternate
- ITF = ITF entry
- PR = Protected ranking
- SR = Special ranking
- SE = Special exempt
- JE = Junior exempt
- JR = Junior Accelerator Programme entrant
- CO = College Accelerator Programme entrant
- NG = Next Gen Accelerator Program entrant
- w/o = Walkover
- r = Retired
- d = Defaulted

=== Finals ===
Quarterfinals
(Israel) Shahar Pe'er	7	3
8	(China) Li Na	5	0^{r}
3	(United States) Venus Williams	6	6
(Russia) Anastasia Pavlyuchenkova	3	4
12	(Russia) Vera Zvonareva	1	3
4	(Belarus) Victoria Azarenka	6	6
7	(Poland) Agnieszka Radwańska	3	6	6
Q	(Russia) Regina Kulikova	6	4	3

Semifinals
(Israel) Shahar Pe'er	1	4
3	(United States) Venus Williams	6	6
4	(Belarus) Victoria Azarenka	6	6
7	(Poland) Agnieszka Radwańska	3	4

Final
3	(United States) Venus Williams	6	7
4	(Belarus) Victoria Azarenka	3	5

=== Top half ===
==== Section 1 ====
First round
(Kazakhstan) Y Shvedova	4	4
(Slovakia) D Cibulková	6	6
(France) V Razzano	6	6
WC	(Tunisia) S Sfar	2	2
(Israel) S Pe'er	3	6	7
13	(Belgium) Y Wickmayer	6	2	5
11	(France) M Bartoli	6	6
Q	(Russia) E Makarova	2	0
(Switzerland) P Schnyder	2	2
(Romania) A Dulgheru	6	6
(Spain) MJ Martínez Sánchez	6	3	6
LL	(Italy) A Brianti	4	6	3

Second round
1	(Denmark) C Wozniacki	6	7
(Slovakia) D Cibulková	2	6^{2}
(France) V Razzano	2	2
(Israel) S Pe'er	6	6
11	(France) M Bartoli	6	6
(Romania) A Dulgheru	2	1
(Spain) MJ Martínez Sánchez	6^{7}	6	4
8	(China) N Li	7	2	6

Third round
1	(Denmark) C Wozniacki	2	5
(Israel) S Pe'er	6	7
11	(France) M Bartoli	6	5	0
8	(China) N Li	3	7	6

Quarterfinals
(Israel) S Pe'er	7	3
8	(China) N Li	5	0^{r}

==== Section 2 ====
First round
(Germany) S Lisicki	6	6
Q	(Chinese Taipei) Y-j Chan	1	4
(Czech Republic) I Benešová	4	1
(Belarus) O Govortsova	6	6
(Romania) S Cîrstea	2	5
14	(Italy) F Schiavone	6	7
9	(Australia) S Stosur	6	2	6^{4}
(Italy) T Garbin	3	6	7
PR	(Slovenia) K Srebotnik	2	1
(Russia) A Pavlyuchenkova	6	6
(Slovakia) D Hantuchová	6	6
Q	(Russia) V Manasieva	4	4

Second round
3	(United States) V Williams	6	6
(Germany) S Lisicki	2	3
(Belarus) O Govortsova	6	6
14	(Italy) F Schiavone	4	4
(Italy) T Garbin	6	1	2
(Russia) A Pavlyuchenkova	4	6	6
(Slovakia) D Hantuchová	6	1
5	(Russia) E Dementieva	4	1^{r}

Third round
3	(United States) V Williams	7	6
(Belarus) O Govortsova	5	0
(Russia) A Pavlyuchenkova	6	6
(Slovakia) D Hantuchová	3	4

Quarterfinals
3	(United States) V Williams	6	6
(Russia) A Pavlyuchenkova	3	4

=== Bottom half ===
==== Section 3 ====
First round
(Austria) S Bammer	3	7	5
(France) A Rezaï	6	5	7
(Switzerland) T Bacsinszky	3	4
Q	(Belgium) K Flipkens	6	6
(Russia) E Vesnina	4	6	5
12	(Russia) V Zvonareva	6	4	7
16	(China) J Zheng	3	6	2
Q	(Australia) A Molik	6	4	6
(Russia) A Kleybanova	6	5	2
Q	(Germany) A-L Grönefeld	1	7	6
(Ukraine) K Bondarenko	6	6
(Slovakia) M Rybáriková	3	1

Second round
6	(Serbia) J Janković	4	6	7
(France) A Rezaï	6	4	5
Q	(Belgium) K Flipkens	0	0
12	(Russia) V Zvonareva	6	6
Q	(Australia) A Molik	4	4
Q	(Germany) A-L Grönefeld	6	6
(Ukraine) K Bondarenko	1^{r}
4	(Belarus) V Azarenka	4

Third round
6	(Serbia) J Janković	3	2
12	(Russia) V Zvonareva	6	6
Q	(Germany) A-L Grönefeld	1	6	3
4	(Belarus) V Azarenka	6	4	6

Quarterfinals
12	(Russia) V Zvonareva	1	3
4	(Belarus) V Azarenka	6	6

==== Section 4 ====
First round
Q	(Latvia) A Sevastova	6	5	7
(Russia) V Dushevina	2	7	5
(Germany) A Petkovic	2	6	6
(Ukraine) A Bondarenko	6	4	3
(Hungary) M Czink	4	1
10/WC	(Italy) F Pennetta	6	6
15	(Russia) N Petrova	6^{5}	6^{5}
WC	(Switzerland) S Vögele	7	7
WC	(Russia) M Kirilenko	3	0
Q	(Russia) R Kulikova	6	6
(India) S Mirza	3	4
(Spain) A Medina Garrigues	6	6

Second round
7	(Poland) A Radwańska	6	6
Q	(Latvia) A Sevastova	3	3
(Germany) A Petkovic	3	3
10/WC	(Italy) F Pennetta	6	6
WC	(Switzerland) S Vögele	3	0
Q	(Russia) R Kulikova	6	6
(Spain) A Medina Garrigues
2	(Russia) S Kuznetsova	w/o

Third round
7	(Poland) A Radwańska	6	6
10/WC	(Italy) F Pennetta	3	0
Q	(Russia) R Kulikova	5	7	6
2	(Russia) S Kuznetsova	7	6^{2}	4

Quarterfinals
7	(Poland) A Radwańska	3	6	6
Q	(Russia) R Kulikova	6	4	3
