= 2008 Qatar Open – Doubles =

Doubles
- 2008 Qatar Open

Final
- Champions: (Germany) Philipp Kohlschreiber; (Czech Republic) David Škoch
- Runners-up: (South Africa) Jeff Coetzee; (South Africa) Wesley Moodie
- Score: 6–4, 4–6, [11–9]

Details
- Draw: 16
- Seeds: 4

Events
Singles	Doubles
← 2007 ·	ATP Qatar Open	· 2009 →

Following are the results of the 2008 Qatar Open – Doubles tennis competition.

Mikhail Youzhny and Nenad Zimonjić were the defending champions, but Youzhny chose not to participate and only Zimonjic competed that year.
Zimonjic partnered with Daniel Nestor, but lost in the quarterfinals to Simon Aspelin and Thomas Johansson.

Philipp Kohlschreiber and David Škoch won in the final 6–4, 4–6, [11–9], against Jeff Coetzee and Wesley Moodie.

== Seeds ==
1. (Canada) Daniel Nestor / (Serbia) Nenad Zimonjić (quarterfinals)
2. (Czech Republic) Martin Damm / (Czech Republic) Pavel Vízner (quarterfinals)
3. (Czech Republic) František Čermák / (Czech Republic) Lukáš Dlouhý (first round)
4. (Poland) Mariusz Fyrstenberg / (Poland) Marcin Matkowski (first round)

== Draw ==
=== Key ===
- Q = Qualifier
- WC = Wild card
- LL = Lucky loser
- Alt = Alternate
- SE = Special exempt
- PR = Protected ranking
- ITF = ITF entry
- JE = Junior exempt
- w/o = Walkover
- r = Retired
- d = Defaulted
- SR = Special ranking

=== Draw ===
First round

Quarterfinals

Semifinals

Final

1
- (Canada) D Nestor
- (Serbia) N Zimonjić
6
6

WC
- (United Kingdom) R Hutchins
- (United Kingdom) A Murray
3
0

1
- (Canada) D Nestor
- (Serbia) N Zimonjić
5
5

- (Sweden) S Aspelin
- (Sweden) T Johansson
6
7

- (Sweden) S Aspelin
- (Sweden) T Johansson
7
7

- (Croatia) I Ljubičić
- (Italy) A Seppi
3
5

- (Sweden) S Aspelin
- (Sweden) T Johansson
6^{2}
6^{2}

3
- (Czech Republic) F Čermák
- (Czech Republic) L Dlouhý
6^{6}
2

- (South Africa) J Coetzee
- (South Africa) W Moodie
7^{7}
7^{7}

- (Belarus) M Mirnyi
- (United Kingdom) J Murray
7^{8}
6

- (Belarus) M Mirnyi
- (United Kingdom) J Murray
4
5

- (South Africa) J Coetzee
- (South Africa) W Moodie
6
6

- (South Africa) J Coetzee
- (South Africa) W Moodie
6
7

- (Germany) N Kiefer
- (Russia) D Tursunov
4
2

- (South Africa) J Coetzee
- (South Africa) W Moodie
4
6
[9]

- (Russia) I Andreev
- (Argentina) A Calleri
1
4

- (Germany) P Kohlschreiber
- (Czech Republic) D Škoch
6
4
[11]

- (Germany) C Kas
- (Netherlands) R Wassen
6
6

- (Germany) C Kas
- (Netherlands) R Wassen
6
6

- (France) F Santoro
- (Switzerland) S Wawrinka
7
6

- (France) F Santoro
- (Switzerland) S Wawrinka
3
2

4
- (Poland) M Fyrstenberg
- (Poland) M Matkowski
5
0

- (Germany) C Kas
- (Netherlands) R Wassen
4
5

- (Germany) P Kohlschreiber
- (Czech Republic) D Škoch
6
6

- (Germany) P Kohlschreiber
- (Czech Republic) D Škoch
6
7

- (Romania) A Pavel
- (Serbia) J Tipsarević
1
2

- (Germany) P Kohlschreiber
- (Czech Republic) D Škoch
6
6

WC
- (Spain) T Robredo
- (Spain) S Ventura
4
1

2
- (Czech Republic) M Damm
- (Czech Republic) P Vízner
4
0

2
- (Czech Republic) M Damm
- (Czech Republic) P Vízner
6
6
