= 2010 Dubai Tennis Championships – Men's doubles =

Men's doubles
- 2010 Dubai Tennis Championships

Final
- Champions: (Sweden) Simon Aspelin (Australia) Paul Hanley
- Runners-up: (Czech Republic) Lukáš Dlouhý (India) Leander Paes
- Score: 6–2, 6–3

Details
- Draw: 16
- Seeds: 4

Events
Singles	men	women
Doubles	men	women
← 2009 ·	Dubai Tennis Championships	· 2011 →

Rik de Voest and Dmitry Tursunov were the defending champions, but chose not to participate that year.
Simon Aspelin and Paul Hanley won in the final 6–2, 6–3, against Lukáš Dlouhý and Leander Paes.

== Seeds ==
1. (Canada) Daniel Nestor / (Serbia) Nenad Zimonjić (first round)
2. (Czech Republic) Lukáš Dlouhý / (India) Leander Paes (final)
3. (India) Mahesh Bhupathi / (Belarus) Max Mirnyi (quarterfinals)
4. (Czech Republic) František Čermák / (Slovakia) Michal Mertiňák (quarterfinals)

== Draw ==
=== Key ===
- Q = Qualifier
- WC = Wild card
- LL = Lucky loser
- Alt = Alternate
- SE = Special exempt
- PR = Protected ranking
- ITF = ITF entry
- JE = Junior exempt
- w/o = Walkover
- r = Retired
- d = Defaulted
- SR = Special ranking

=== Draws ===
First round
1	(Canada) D Nestor (Serbia) N Zimonjić	3	6	[7]
(Spain) F López (Spain) T Robredo	6	3	[10]
(France) F Serra (France) G Simon	6^{4}	0
(Serbia) J Tipsarević (Serbia) V Troicki	7^{7}	6
3	(India) M Bhupathi (Belarus) M Mirnyi	7	6
WC	(United Arab Emirates) M-N Al Baloushi (Kuwait) A Magdas	5	0
(Sweden) S Aspelin (Australia) P Hanley	6	6
(Serbia) N Djokovic (Serbia) D Vemić	4	3
(Germany) C Kas (Belgium) D Norman	6	7^{7}
(Croatia) I Ljubičić (Austria) J Melzer	4	6^{4}
(Russia) N Davydenko (Russia) I Kunitsyn
4	(Czech Republic) F Čermák (Slovakia) M Mertiňák	w/o
WC	(India) R Bopanna (Pakistan) A-u-H Qureshi	7	6^{5}	[8]
(France) A Clément (Sweden) R Lindstedt	5	7^{7}	[10]
(Poland) M Fyrstenberg (Poland) M Matkowski	6^{7}	3
2	(Czech Republic) L Dlouhý (India) L Paes	7^{9}	6

Quarterfinals
(Spain) F López (Spain) T Robredo	6	6
(Serbia) J Tipsarević (Serbia) V Troicki	3	4
3	(India) M Bhupathi (Belarus) M Mirnyi	4	4
(Sweden) S Aspelin (Australia) P Hanley	6	6
(Germany) C Kas (Belgium) D Norman	6	6
4	(Czech Republic) F Čermák (Slovakia) M Mertiňák	4	2
(France) A Clément (Sweden) R Lindstedt	6^{3}	1
2	(Czech Republic) L Dlouhý (India) L Paes	7^{7}	6

Semifinals
(Spain) F López (Spain) T Robredo	2	6	[12]
(Sweden) S Aspelin (Australia) P Hanley	6	3	[14]
(Germany) C Kas (Belgium) D Norman	6	6^{6}	[7]
2	(Czech Republic) L Dlouhý (India) L Paes	2	7^{8}	[10]

Final
(Sweden) S Aspelin (Australia) P Hanley	6	6
2	(Czech Republic) L Dlouhý (India) L Paes	2	3
