= 2009 Dubai Tennis Championships – Men's singles =

Men's singles
- 2009 Dubai Tennis Championships

Final
- Champion: (Serbia) Novak Djokovic
- Runner-up: (Spain) David Ferrer
- Score: 7–5, 6–3

Details
- Draw: 32
- Seeds: 8

Events
Singles	men	women
Doubles	men	women
- Dubai Tennis Championships

Andy Roddick was the defending champion, but chose not to participate to protest the United Arab Emirates decision to deny Israeli player Shahar Pe'er a visa to enter the country for the women's tournament.

In the final, Novak Djokovic defeated David Ferrer, 7–5, 6–3.

== Seeds ==
1. (Serbia) Novak Djokovic (champion)
2. (United Kingdom) Andy Murray (quarterfinals, withdrew due to a viral infection)
3. (France) Gilles Simon (semifinals)
4. (Spain) David Ferrer (final)
5. (Croatia) Marin Čilić (quarterfinals)
6. (Russia) Igor Andreev (quarterfinals)
7. (Croatia) Ivo Karlović (first round)
8. (Russia) Marat Safin (first round)

== Draw ==
Key

- Q = Qualifier
- WC = Wild card
- LL = Lucky loser
- Alt = Alternate
- ITF = ITF entry
- PR = Protected ranking
- SR = Special ranking
- SE = Special exempt
- JE = Junior exempt
- JR = Junior Accelerator Programme entrant
- CO = College Accelerator Programme entrant
- NG = Next Gen Accelerator Program entrant
- w/o = Walkover
- r = Retired
- d = Defaulted

=== Finals ===
Semifinals
1	(Serbia) Novak Djokovic	3	7	7
3	(France) Gilles Simon	6	5	5
4	(Spain) David Ferrer	6	6
(France) Richard Gasquet	2	2

Final
1	(Serbia) Novak Djokovic	7	6
4	(Spain) David Ferrer	5	3

=== Top half ===
First round
1	(Serbia) N Djokovic	6	6
Q	(Italy) F Cipolla	3	2
(Czech Republic) J Hernych	4	6	6
(Russia) M Youzhny	6	1	4
(Austria) J Melzer	6	3	3
(France) J Benneteau	1	6	6
(Serbia) J Tipsarević	6	6^{3}	4
5	(Croatia) M Čilić	2	7^{7}	6
3	(France) G Simon	5	6	6
WC	(Kuwait) M Ghareeb	7	4	4
(Russia) T Gabashvili	5	7^{7}	6
Q	(France) L Recouderc	7	6^{4}	3
(Romania) V Hănescu	4	2
(France) F Santoro	6	6
Q	(Switzerland) M Chiudinelli	7^{7}	4	7^{9}
7	(Croatia) I Karlović	6^{4}	6	6^{7}

Second round
1	(Serbia) N Djokovic	6	3	6
(Czech Republic) J Hernych	3	6	4
(France) J Benneteau	3	6	5
5	(Croatia) M Čilić	6	4	7
3	(France) G Simon	6	6
(Russia) T Gabashvili	1	2
(France) F Santoro	3	6	7^{7}
Q	(Switzerland) M Chiudinelli	6	1	6^{1}

Quarterfinals
1	(Serbia) N Djokovic	6	6
5	(Croatia) M Čilić	3	4
3	(France) G Simon	7^{7}	6
(France) F Santoro	6^{3}	1

Semifinals
1	(Serbia) N Djokovic	3	7	7
3	(France) G Simon	6	5	5

=== Bottom half ===
First round
6	(Russia) I Andreev	6	6
LL	(South Africa) R de Voest	4	0
(Russia) D Tursunov	6	6
WC	(Italy) A Seppi	1	4
(Germany) P Kohlschreiber	6	6
Q	(Switzerland) M Lammer	1	1
(Croatia) I Ljubičić	6	2	1
4	(Spain) D Ferrer	3	6	6
8/WC	(Russia) M Safin	3	7	3
(France) R Gasquet	6	5	6
(Serbia) V Troicki	3	4
(Italy) S Bolelli	6	6
(Germany) R Schüttler	6	3	3
(France) A Clément	1	6	6
(Ukraine) S Stakhovsky	7^{7}	3	3^{r}
2	(United Kingdom) A Murray	6^{3}	6	5

Second round
6	(Russia) I Andreev	5	6	6
(Russia) D Tursunov	7	4	3
(Germany) P Kohlschreiber	4	2
4	(Spain) D Ferrer	6	6
(France) R Gasquet	6^{4}	6	7^{7}
(Italy) S Bolelli	7^{7}	3	6^{5}
(France) A Clément	2	3
2	(United Kingdom) A Murray	6	6

Quarterfinals
6	(Russia) I Andreev	5	1
4	(Spain) D Ferrer	7	6
(France) R Gasquet	w/o
2	(United Kingdom) A Murray

Semifinals
4	(Spain) D Ferrer	6	6
(France) R Gasquet	2	2

== Qualifying ==
=== Seeds ===
1. (Czech Republic) Ivo Minář (first round)
2. (Italy) Flavio Cipolla (qualified)
3. (South Africa) Rik de Voest (qualifying competition, lucky loser)
4. (Czech Republic) Lukáš Dlouhý (first round)
5. (Andorra) Laurent Recouderc (qualified)
6. (India) Prakash Amritraj (first round, retired due to illness)
7. (Italy) Paolo Lorenzi (qualifying competition)
8. (Turkey) Marsel İlhan (qualifying competition)

=== Qualifiers ===
1. (Switzerland) Michael Lammer
2. (Italy) Flavio Cipolla
3. (Andorra) Laurent Recouderc
4. (Switzerland) Marco Chiudinelli

=== Lucky loser ===
1. (South Africa) Rik de Voest

=== Draw ===
==== First qualifier ====
First round
1	(Czech Republic) Ivo Minář	3	6	6^{1}
(Switzerland) Michael Lammer	6	4	7^{7}
(France) Jonathan Dasnières de Veigy	5
6	(India) Prakash Amritraj	0^{r}

Qualifying competition
1	(Switzerland) Michael Lammer	6	6
(France) Jonathan Dasnières de Veigy	1	3

==== Second qualifier ====
First round
2	(Italy) Flavio Cipolla	6	6
WC	(Lebanon) Karim Alayli	0	2
(Switzerland) George Bastl	5	7^{8}	3
8	(Turkey) Marsel İlhan	7	6^{6}	5

Qualifying competition
2	(Italy) Flavio Cipolla	6	6
8	(Turkey) Marsel İlhan	2	4

==== Third qualifier ====
First round
3	(South Africa) Rik de Voest	6	6
WC	(United Arab Emirates) Mahmoud-Nader Al Baloushi	0	0
(Sweden) Björn Rehnquist	4	0
5	(Andorra) Laurent Recouderc	6	6

Qualifying competition
3	(South Africa) Rik de Voest	4	4
5	(Andorra) Laurent Recouderc	6	6

==== Fourth qualifier ====
First round
4	(Czech Republic) Lukáš Dlouhý	3	6	4
WC	(Switzerland) Marco Chiudinelli	6	3	6
(Italy) Marco Crugnola	2	6	4
7	(Italy) Paolo Lorenzi	6	4	6

Qualifying competition
WC	(Switzerland) Marco Chiudinelli	7^{7}	6
7	(Italy) Paolo Lorenzi	6^{1}	4
