= 2008 Qatar Open =

2008 Qatar ExxonMobil Open
- Date: 31 December 2007 – 5 January 2008
- Edition: 16th
- Category: International Series
- Draw: 32S / 16D
- Prize money: $1,110,250
- Surface: Hard / outdoor
- Location: Doha, Qatar
- Venue: Khalifa International Tennis Complex

Champions

Singles
- (United Kingdom) Andy Murray

Doubles
- (Germany) Philipp Kohlschreiber / (Czech Republic) David Škoch
- ATP Qatar Open

The 2008 Qatar Open, known as the 2008 Qatar ExxonMobil Open, for sponsorship reasons, was a tennis tournament played on outdoor hard courts. It was the 16th edition of the Qatar ExxonMobil Open, and was part of the International Series of the 2008 ATP Tour. It took place at the Khalifa International Tennis Complex in Doha, Qatar, from 31 December 2007 through 5 January 2008.

The men's singles field was led by ATP No. 4, US Open semifinalist and Moscow champion Nikolay Davydenko, Metz titlist Tommy Robredo, and St. Petersburg winner and 2007 Doha runner-up Andy Murray. Among other top seeds competing were Doha defending champion Ivan Ljubičić, Stockholm winner Ivo Karlović, Philipp Kohlschreiber, Igor Andreev and Dmitry Tursunov. Third-seeded Andy Murray won the singles title.

== Finals ==
=== Singles ===
(United Kingdom) Andy Murray defeated (Switzerland) Stanislas Wawrinka, 6–4, 4–6, 6–2

=== Doubles ===
(Germany) Philipp Kohlschreiber / (Czech Republic) David Škoch defeated (South Africa) Jeff Coetzee / (South Africa) Wesley Moodie, 6–4, 4–6, [11–9]
