= 2009 Dubai Tennis Championships =

- Date: 23–28 February (men); 15 – 21 February (women)
- Edition: 17th (men) / 9th (women)
- Category: ATP World Tour 500 (men); WTA Premier 5 event (woman)
- Location: Dubai, United Arab Emirates
- Venue: Aviation Club Tennis Centre

Champions

Men's singles
- (Serbia) Novak Djokovic

Women's singles
- (United States) Venus Williams

Men's doubles
- (South Africa) Rik de Voest / (Russia) Dmitry Tursunov

Women's doubles
- (Zimbabwe) Cara Black / (United States) Liezel Huber
- Dubai Tennis Championships

The 2009 Barclays Dubai Tennis Championships was a 500 Series event on the 2009 ATP World Tour and a Premier 5 event on the 2009 WTA Tour. Both of the events took place at The Aviation Club Tennis Centre in Dubai, United Arab Emirates. The women's tournament took place from 15 to 21 February 2009, while the men's tournament took place from 23 to 28 February 2009.

The men's draw was led by only 3 of the world's Top 10 men: ATP No. 3 Novak Djokovic, Doha, Rotterdam champion Andy Murray and ATP No. 8 Gilles Simon. Australian Open runner-up and four-time champion Roger Federer was scheduled to take part, however he was forced to withdraw from the tournament due to a back injury. ATP No. 1, Rotterdam finalist, 2006 titlist & recent Australian Open champion Rafael Nadal was also due to compete but was also forced to withdraw from the event due to a knee injury sustained at the previous event in Rotterdam. Defending champion Andy Roddick withdrew from the event due to the Shahar Pe'er incident and chose not to defend his title as a protest. Nikolay Davydenko and Fernando Verdasco were also scheduled to play but withdrew due to injuries.

In the women's event, nine of the ten highest ranked players participated. The top four seeds were Serena Williams, the 2009 Australian Open champion, Dinara Safina, the 2009 Australian Open runner-up, Jelena Janković, a former world No. 1, and Elena Dementieva, the runner-up at the recent Open GDF SUEZ tournament in Paris. Also in the field were Vera Zvonareva, a 2009 Australian Open semifinalist and winner of the recent Pattaya Women's Open, Venus Williams, the reigning Wimbledon champion, Svetlana Kuznetsova, and Ana Ivanovic.

== Shahar Pe'er controversy ==
The tournament became embroiled in controversy when the Dubai government refused to grant a visa to Israeli player Shahar Pe'er, denying her the ability to take part in the 2009 Dubai Tennis Championships. The refusal to allow Pe'er to participate drew immense criticism from top seed players. WTA chief executive Larry Scott said the women's tour was "deeply disappointed" by the decision. "Ms. Pe'er has earned the right to play in the tournament and it's regrettable that the UAE is denying her this right", he said. "Ms. Peer and her family are obviously extremely upset and disappointed by the decision of the UAE and its impact on her personally and professionally." Scott said the WTA would "review appropriate future actions with regard to the future of the Dubai tournament". In reaction to the move, the Tennis Channel decided not to televise the event, and The Wall Street Journal dropped its sponsorship. In response to the move by the UAE, the Dubai Tennis Championship was fined a record US$300,000. Pe'er was awarded US$44,250, an amount equal to the average prize money she earned per tournament in 2008. A number of highly ranked tennis players, including 2008 winner Andy Roddick, pulled out of the men's ATP tournament in Dubai in protest. Roger Federer and Rafael Nadal also pulled out of the tournament, although they both cited injury as their reason for withdrawal, not the incident involving Pe'er. The WTA Tour Board also demanded that Dubai organizers confirm that qualifying Israeli players will get visas at least eight weeks in advance for the 2010 event.

== Finals ==
=== Men's singles ===
(Serbia) Novak Djokovic defeated (Spain) David Ferrer 7–5, 6–3

- It was Djokovic's first title of the year and 12th of his career.

=== Women's singles ===
(United States) Venus Williams defeated (France) Virginie Razzano 6–4, 6–2

- It was Venus' first title of the year and 40th of her career.

=== Men's doubles ===
(South Africa) Rik de Voest / (Russia) Dmitry Tursunov defeated (Czech Republic) Martin Damm / (Sweden) Robert Lindstedt 4–6, 6–3, [10–5]

=== Women's doubles ===
(Zimbabwe) Cara Black / (United States) Liezel Huber defeated (Russia) Maria Kirilenko / (Poland) Agnieszka Radwańska 6–3, 6–3

== WTA entrants ==
=== Seeds ===
Athlete	Nationality	Ranking*	Seeding
Serena Williams	United States	1	1
Dinara Safina	Russia	2	2
Jelena Janković	Serbia	3	3
Elena Dementieva	Russia	4	4
Vera Zvonareva	Russia	5	5
Venus Williams	United States	6	6
Svetlana Kuznetsova	Russia	7	7
Ana Ivanovic	Serbia	8	8
Agnieszka Radwańska	Poland	10	9
Alizé Cornet	France	11	10
Marion Bartoli	France	13	11
Dominika Cibulková	Slovakia	18	12
Zheng Jie	China	20	13
Anabel Medina Garrigues	Spain	21	14
Anna Chakvetadze	Russia	23	15
Kaia Kanepi	Estonia	24	16

- Rankings as of 16 February 2009.

=== Other entrants ===
The following players received wildcards into the main draw:

- (India) Sania Mirza
- (Russia) Vera Dushevina
- (Switzerland) Stefanie Vögele

The following players received entry from the qualifying draw:

- (Russia) Anastasia Rodionova
- (Poland) Urszula Radwańska
- (Russia) Anna Lapushchenkova
- (Germany) Julia Schruff
- (Russia) Elena Vesnina
- (Ukraine) Viktoriya Kutuzova
- (Austria) Tamira Paszek
- (China) Yan Zi

The following players received the lucky loser spots:

- (Japan) Ayumi Morita
- (Slovenia) Andreja Klepač
- (France) Camille Pin

== ATP entrants ==
=== Seeds ===
Athlete	Nationality	Ranking*	Seeding
Novak Djokovic	Serbia	3	1
Andy Murray	(United Kingdom) Great Britain	4	2
Gilles Simon	France	8	3
David Ferrer	Spain	14	4
Marin Čilić	Croatia	19	5
Igor Andreev	Russia	24	6
Ivo Karlović	Croatia	29	7
Marat Safin	Russia	25	8

- Rankings as of 23 February 2009.

=== Other entrants ===
The following players received wildcards into the main draw:

- (Russia) Marat Safin
- (Italy) Andreas Seppi
- (Kuwait) Mohammed Ghareeb

The following players received entry from the qualifying draw:

- (Italy) Flavio Cipolla
- (France) Laurent Recouderc
- (Switzerland) Marco Chiudinelli
- (Switzerland) Michael Lammer

The following player received the lucky loser spot:

- (South Africa) Rik de Voest
