= 2009 Dubai Tennis Championships – Women's doubles =

Women's doubles
- 2009 Dubai Tennis Championships

Final
- Champions: (Zimbabwe) Cara Black (United States) Liezel Huber
- Runners-up: (Russia) Maria Kirilenko (Poland) Agnieszka Radwańska
- Score: 6–3, 6–3

Events
Singles	men	women
Doubles	men	women
- Dubai Tennis Championships

Cara Black and Liezel Huber were the defending champions, and won in the final, 6–3, 6–3, over Maria Kirilenko and Agnieszka Radwańska.

== Seeds ==
The top four seeds receive a bye into the second round.

1. (Zimbabwe) Cara Black / (United States) Liezel Huber (champions)
2. (Czech Republic) Květa Peschke / (United States) Lisa Raymond (second round)
3. (Australia) Samantha Stosur / (Australia) Rennae Stubbs (semifinals)
4. (Spain) Anabel Medina Garrigues / (Italy) Francesca Schiavone (semifinals)
5. (Slovakia) Daniela Hantuchová / (Japan) Ai Sugiyama (first round, withdrew)
6. (China) Yan Zi / (China) Zheng Jie (first round)
7. (Romania) Monica Niculescu / (Russia) Elena Vesnina (quarterfinals)
8. (Chinese Taipei) Chan Yung-jan / (China) Sun Tiantian (quarterfinals)

== Draw ==
Key

- Q = Qualifier
- WC = Wild card
- LL = Lucky loser
- Alt = Alternate
- ITF = ITF entry
- PR = Protected ranking
- SR = Special ranking
- SE = Special exempt
- JE = Junior exempt
- JR = Junior Accelerator Programme entrant
- CO = College Accelerator Programme entrant
- NG = Next Gen Accelerator Program entrant
- w/o = Walkover
- r = Retired
- d = Defaulted

=== Finals ===
Semifinals
1	(Zimbabwe) Cara Black (United States) Liezel Huber	6	6
3	(Australia) Samantha Stosur (Australia) Rennae Stubbs	4	4
4	(Spain) Anabel Medina Garrigues (Italy) Francesca Schiavone	6	3	[8]
(Russia) Maria Kirilenko (Poland) Agnieszka Radwańska	2	6	[10]

Final
1	(Zimbabwe) Cara Black (United States) Liezel Huber	6	6
(Russia) Maria Kirilenko (Poland) Agnieszka Radwańska	3	3

=== Top half ===
First round
(India) S Mirza (Italy) M Santangelo	w/o
(Poland) U Radwańska (Switzerland) S Vögele
(Slovakia) D Cibulková (France) V Razzano	6	7
(Czech Republic) E Hrdinová (Poland) A Rosolska	3	6^{5}
WC	(Oman) F Al Nabhani (Portugal) M de Lattre	7	5	[4]
8	(Chinese Taipei) Y-j Chan (China) T Sun	5	7	[10]
(Estonia) K Kanepi (Austria) T Paszek	3	7	[9]
(Ukraine) V Kutuzova (Russia) A Lapushchenkova	6	5	[11]
(Italy) S Errani (Germany) J Schruff	6^{5}	4
(Slovenia) A Klepač (Japan) A Morita	7	6
(Ukraine) A Bondarenko (Ukraine) K Bondarenko	6	4	[11]
6	(China) Z Yan (China) J Zheng	3	6	[9]

Second round
1	(Zimbabwe) C Black (United States) L Huber	6	6
(India) S Mirza (Italy) M Santangelo	3	3
(Slovakia) D Cibulková (France) V Razzano
8	(Chinese Taipei) Y-j Chan (China) T Sun	w/o
3	(Australia) S Stosur (Australia) R Stubbs	6	6
(Ukraine) V Kutuzova (Russia) A Lapushchenkova	3	4
(Slovenia) A Klepač (Japan) A Morita	2	0
(Ukraine) A Bondarenko (Ukraine) K Bondarenko	6	6

Quarterfinals
1	(Zimbabwe) C Black (United States) L Huber	6	6
8	(Chinese Taipei) Y-j Chan (China) T Sun	2	2
3	(Australia) S Stosur (Australia) R Stubbs	3	6	[12]
(Ukraine) A Bondarenko (Ukraine) K Bondarenko	6	3	[10]

Semifinals
1	(Zimbabwe) C Black (United States) L Huber	6	6
3	(Australia) S Stosur (Australia) R Stubbs	4	4

=== Bottom half ===
First round
7	(Romania) M Niculescu (Russia) E Vesnina	6	6
(Slovakia) Z Kučová (Slovakia) L Tvarošková	1	2
(France) C Pin (Tunisia) S Sfar	7	1	[10]
(Russia) A Kleybanova (Russia) E Makarova	6^{3}	6	[7]
(Russia) V Dushevina (Ukraine) M Koryttseva	5	6	[7]
(Belarus) T Poutchek (Russia) A Rodionova	7	4	[10]
5	(Slovakia) D Hantuchová (Japan) A Sugiyama
(United States) R Kops-Jones (Czech Republic) V Uhlířová	w/o
(Uzbekistan) A Amanmuradova (Chinese Taipei) C-J Chuang	w/o
(Germany) A-L Grönefeld (Israel) S Pe'er
(Russia) M Kirilenko (Poland) A Radwańska	7	6
(Romania) S Cîrstea (Russia) A Rodionova	5	4

Second round
7	(Romania) M Niculescu (Russia) E Vesnina	3	r
(France) C Pin (Tunisia) S Sfar	0
(Belarus) T Poutchek (Russia) A Rodionova	3	6	[9]
4	(Spain) A Medina Garrigues (Italy) F Schiavone	6	2	[11]
(United States) R Kops-Jones (Czech Republic) V Uhlířová	4	4
(Uzbekistan) A Amanmuradova (Chinese Taipei) C-J Chuang	6	6
(Russia) M Kirilenko (Poland) A Radwańska	6	6
2	(Czech Republic) K Peschke (United States) L Raymond	4	3

Quarterfinals
7	(Romania) M Niculescu (Russia) E Vesnina	3	2
4	(Spain) A Medina Garrigues (Italy) F Schiavone	6	6
(Uzbekistan) A Amanmuradova (Chinese Taipei) C-J Chuang	6	4	[7]
(Russia) M Kirilenko (Poland) A Radwańska	4	6	[10]

Semifinals
4	(Spain) A Medina Garrigues (Italy) F Schiavone	6	3	[8]
(Russia) M Kirilenko (Poland) A Radwańska	2	6	[10]
