= 2009 Qatar Open – Doubles =

Doubles
- 2009 Qatar Open

Final
- Champions: (Spain) Marc López (Spain) Rafael Nadal
- Runners-up: (Canada) Daniel Nestor (Serbia) Nenad Zimonjić
- Score: 4–6, 6–4, [10–8]

Details
- Draw: 16
- Seeds: 4

Events
Singles	Doubles
← 2008 ·	ATP Qatar Open	· 2010 →

Philipp Kohlschreiber and David Škoch were the defending champions, but Škoch chose not to participate, and only Kohlschreiber competed that year. Kohlschreiber partnered with Christopher Kas, but lost in the quarterfinals to Marc López and Rafael Nadal.

Marc López and Rafael Nadal won in the final 4–6, 6–4, [10–8], against Daniel Nestor and Nenad Zimonjić.

== Seeds ==
1. (Canada) Daniel Nestor / (Serbia) Nenad Zimonjić (final)
2. (South Africa) Jeff Coetzee / (South Africa) Wesley Moodie (quarterfinals)
3. (Poland) Mariusz Fyrstenberg / (Poland) Marcin Matkowski (first round)
4. (Germany) Christopher Kas / (Germany) Philipp Kohlschreiber (quarterfinals)

== Draw ==
=== Key ===
- Q = Qualifier
- WC = Wild card
- LL = Lucky loser
- Alt = Alternate
- SE = Special exempt
- PR = Protected ranking
- ITF = ITF entry
- JE = Junior exempt
- w/o = Walkover
- r = Retired
- d = Defaulted
- SR = Special ranking

=== Draw ===
First round

Quarterfinals

Semifinals

Final

1
(Canada) D Nestor
(Serbia) N Zimonjić
6
6

- (France) A Clément
- (France) N Devilder
3
1

1
- (Canada) D Nestor
- (Serbia) N Zimonjić
7
6

- (Slovakia) M Mertiňák
- (Italy) P Starace
2
3

- (Poland) Ł Kubot
- (Russia) D Tursunov
5
4

(Poland) Ł Kubot
(Russia) D Tursunov
6
6

1
(Canada) D Nestor
(Serbia) N Zimonjić
6
6^{8}
[10]

3
- (Poland) M Fyrstenberg
- (Poland) M Matkowski
1
6^{5}

- (United States) J Cerretani
- (Romania) V Hănescu
1
7^{10}
[3]

(Germany) P Petzschner
(Austria) A Peya
6
7^{7}

- (Germany) P Petzschner
- (Austria) A Peya
4
6^{8}

(United States) J Cerretani
(Romania) V Hănescu
6
6

(United States) J Cerretani
(Romania) V Hănescu
6
7^{10}

- (Italy) A Seppi
- (Serbia) V Troicki
4
4

1
- (Canada) D Nestor
- (Serbia) N Zimonjić
6
4
[8]

WC
(Spain) M López
(Spain) R Nadal
6
6

WC
(Spain) M López
(Spain) R Nadal
4
6
[10]

- (Spain) Ó Hernández
- (Spain) A Montañés
3
3

WC
(Spain) M López
(Spain) R Nadal
6^{7}
6
[10]

- (United Kingdom) R Hutchins
- (United Kingdom) A Murray
5
4

4
- (Germany) C Kas
- (Germany) P Kohlschreiber
7^{9}
4
[3]

4
(Germany) C Kas
(Germany) P Kohlschreiber
7
6

WC
(Spain) M López
(Spain) R Nadal
1
7^{7}
[11]

(France) F Santoro
(Russia) M Youzhny
6
6

- (France) F Santoro
- (Russia) M Youzhny
6
6^{2}
[9]

WC
- (Qatar) A Haji
- (Algeria) L Ouahab
0
2

- (France) F Santoro
- (Russia) M Youzhny
7
7^{7}

- (Russia) I Andreev
- (Czech Republic) J Levinský
4
6
[1]

2
- (South Africa) J Coetzee
- (South Africa) W Moodie
5
6^{2}

2
(South Africa) J Coetzee
(South Africa) W Moodie
6
2
[10]
