= 2010 Dubai Tennis Championships – Men's singles =

Men's singles
- 2010 Dubai Tennis Championships

Final
- Champion: (Serbia) Novak Djokovic
- Runner-up: (Russia) Mikhail Youzhny
- Score: 7–5, 5–7, 6–3

Details
- Draw: 32
- Seeds: 8

Events
Singles	men	women
Doubles	men	women
- Dubai Tennis Championships

Novak Djokovic was the defending champion, and won in the final 7–5, 5–7, 6–3, against Mikhail Youzhny.

== Seeds ==
1. (Switzerland) Roger Federer (withdrew due to a lung infection)
2. (Serbia) Novak Djokovic (champion)
3. (United Kingdom) Andy Murray (second round)
4. (Russia) Nikolay Davydenko (second round, retired due to a left wrist injury)
5. (France) Jo-Wilfried Tsonga (second round)
6. (Croatia) Marin Čilić (quarterfinals)
7. (Russia) Mikhail Youzhny (final)
8. (France) Gilles Simon (first round)

== Draw ==
Key

- Q = Qualifier
- WC = Wild card
- LL = Lucky loser
- Alt = Alternate
- ITF = ITF entry
- PR = Protected ranking
- SR = Special ranking
- SE = Special exempt
- JE = Junior exempt
- JR = Junior Accelerator Programme entrant
- CO = College Accelerator Programme entrant
- NG = Next Gen Accelerator Program entrant
- w/o = Walkover
- r = Retired
- d = Defaulted

=== Finals ===
Semifinals
(Austria) Jürgen Melzer	5	6^{4}
7	(Russia) Mikhail Youzhny	7	7^{7}
(Cyprus) Marcos Baghdatis	7^{7}	3	4
2	(Serbia) Novak Djokovic	6^{2}	6	6

Final
7	(Russia) Mikhail Youzhny	5	7	3
2	(Serbia) Novak Djokovic	7	5	6

=== Top half ===
First round
(Spain) T Robredo	6	6
(France) J Benneteau	2	1
(Austria) J Melzer	6	7
(Italy) S Bolelli	1	5
Q	(Austria) S Koubek	7^{7}	6
(Spain) F López	6^{4}	4
(France) A Clément	2	4
6	(Croatia) M Čilić	6	6
3	(United Kingdom) A Murray	6	6
Q	(Russia) I Kunitsyn	2	3
(Italy) A Seppi	6^{4}	5
(Serbia) J Tipsarević	7^{7}	7
WC	(Kuwait) M Ghareeb	0^{r}
Q	(Germany) B Phau	3
(Slovakia) L Lacko	7^{7}	6^{5}	1
7	(Russia) M Youzhny	6^{3}	7^{7}	6

Second round
(Spain) T Robredo	3	5
(Austria) J Melzer	6	7
Q	(Austria) S Koubek	2	6^{6}
6	(Croatia) M Čilić	6	7^{8}
3	(United Kingdom) A Murray	6^{3}	6	4
(Serbia) J Tipsarević	7^{7}	4	6
Q	(Germany) B Phau	6^{2}	4
7	(Russia) M Youzhny	7^{7}	6

Quarterfinals
(Austria) J Melzer	7^{10}	7
6	(Croatia) M Čilić	6^{8}	5
(Serbia) J Tipsarević	3	4
7	(Russia) M Youzhny	6	6

Semifinals
(Austria) J Melzer	5	6^{4}
7	(Russia) M Youzhny	7	7^{7}

=== Bottom half ===
First round
8	(France) G Simon	6^{3}	4
(Cyprus) M Baghdatis	7^{7}	6
(Switzerland) M Chiudinelli	4	5
Q	(India) S Devvarman	6	7
(Germany) M Berrer	6	7^{7}
(Ukraine) S Stakhovsky	4	6^{3}
(France) F Serra	7^{7}	4	1
4	(Russia) N Davydenko	6^{5}	6	6
5/WC	(France) J-W Tsonga	7^{11}
(France) M Llodra	6^{9}	r
(Croatia) I Ljubičić	6	6^{3}	6
LL	(Czech Republic) J Hernych	2	7^{7}	4
(Serbia) V Troicki	6	6
WC	(Germany) R Schüttler	3	4
(Spain) G García-López	4	4
2	(Serbia) N Djokovic	6	6

Second round
(Cyprus) M Baghdatis	6	3	6
Q	(India) S Devvarman	3	6	1
(Germany) M Berrer	6
4	(Russia) N Davydenko	3	r
5/WC	(France) J-W Tsonga	5	3
(Croatia) I Ljubičić	7	6
(Serbia) V Troicki	6	4	2
2	(Serbia) N Djokovic	3	6	6

Quarterfinals
(Cyprus) M Baghdatis	7^{7}	6
(Germany) M Berrer	6^{5}	1
(Croatia) I Ljubičić	6	4	0
2	(Serbia) N Djokovic	2	6	6

Semifinals
(Cyprus) M Baghdatis	7^{7}	3	4
2	(Serbia) N Djokovic	6^{2}	6	6

== Qualifying ==
=== Seeds ===
1. (Russia) Igor Kunitsyn (qualified)
2. (Serbia) Dušan Vemić (first round)
3. (Germany) Björn Phau (qualified)
4. (Austria) Stefan Koubek (qualified)
5. (Turkey) Marsel İlhan (first round)
6. (Czech Republic) Jan Hernych (qualifying competition, lucky loser)
7. (India) Somdev Devvarman (qualified)
8. (Ukraine) Ivan Sergeyev (qualifying competition)

=== Qualifiers ===
1. (Russia) Igor Kunitsyn
2. (India) Somdev Devvarman
3. (Germany) Björn Phau
4. (Austria) Stefan Koubek

=== Lucky loser ===
1. (Czech Republic) Jan Hernych

=== Draw ===
==== First qualifier ====
First round
1	(Russia) Igor Kunitsyn	6	6
WC	(United Arab Emirates) Mahmoud-Nader Al Baloushi	2	4
(Ukraine) Sergei Bubka	4	4
6	(Czech Republic) Jan Hernych	6	6

Qualifying competition
1	(Russia) Igor Kunitsyn	6	6
6	(Czech Republic) Jan Hernych	4	2

==== Second qualifier ====
First round
2	(Serbia) Dušan Vemić	3	6^{6}
(Belgium) Dick Norman	6	7^{8}
WC	(Kuwait) Abdullah Maqdes	2	2
7	(India) Somdev Devvarman	6	6

Qualifying competition
(Belgium) Dick Norman	6	6^{1}	1
7	(India) Somdev Devvarman	3	7^{7}	6

==== Third qualifier ====
First round
3	(Germany) Björn Phau	6	6
(United States) Brendan Evans	1	4
(France) Sébastien De Chaunac
8	(Ukraine) Ivan Sergeyev	w/o

Qualifying competition
3	(Germany) Björn Phau	7^{10}	6
8	(Ukraine) Ivan Sergeyev	6^{8}	4

==== Fourth qualifier ====
First round
4	(Austria) Stefan Koubek	5	7
(Switzerland) Michael Lammer	7	5^{d}
WC	(Czech Republic) Lukáš Dlouhý	3	7^{7}	6
5	(Turkey) Marsel İlhan	6	6^{5}	3

Qualifying competition
4	(Austria) Stefan Koubek	5	6	7^{7}
WC	(Czech Republic) Lukáš Dlouhý	7	2	6^{3}
