= 2010 Dubai Tennis Championships – Women's doubles =

Women's doubles
- 2010 Dubai Tennis Championships

Final
- Champions: (Spain) Nuria Llagostera Vives (Spain) María José Martínez Sánchez
- Runners-up: (Czech Republic) Květa Peschke (Slovenia) Katarina Srebotnik
- Score: 7-6(5), 6-4

Events
Singles	men	women
Doubles	men	women
- Dubai Tennis Championships

Cara Black and Liezel Huber were the defending champions; however, they lost in the semifinals 4–6, 6–2, [9–11], against Květa Peschke and Katarina Srebotnik.
Nuria Llagostera Vives and María José Martínez Sánchez won in the finals 7–6(5), 6–4 against Květa Peschke and Katarina Srebotnik.

== Seeds ==
The top four seeds receive a bye into the second round.

1. (Zimbabwe) Cara Black / (United States) Liezel Huber (semifinals)
2. (Spain) Nuria Llagostera Vives / (Spain) María José Martínez Sánchez (champions)
3. (United States) Lisa Raymond / (Australia) Rennae Stubbs (second round)
4. (Russia) Nadia Petrova / (Australia) Samantha Stosur(semifinals)
5. (Russia) Alisa Kleybanova / (Italy) Francesca Schiavone (quarterfinals)
6. (Russia) Ekaterina Makarova / (China) Yan Zi (first round)
7. (India) Sania Mirza / (Spain) Virginia Ruano Pascual (first round)
8. (Russia) Maria Kirilenko / (Poland) Agnieszka Radwańska (second round)

== Draw ==
Key

- Q = Qualifier
- WC = Wild card
- LL = Lucky loser
- Alt = Alternate
- ITF = ITF entry
- PR = Protected ranking
- SR = Special ranking
- SE = Special exempt
- JE = Junior exempt
- JR = Junior Accelerator Programme entrant
- CO = College Accelerator Programme entrant
- NG = Next Gen Accelerator Program entrant
- w/o = Walkover
- r = Retired
- d = Defaulted

=== Finals ===
Semifinals
1	(Zimbabwe) Cara Black (United States) Liezel Huber	4	6	[9]
(Czech Republic) Květa Peschke (Slovenia) Katarina Srebotnik	6	2	[11]
4	(Russia) Nadia Petrova (Australia) Samantha Stosur	2	4
2	(Spain) Nuria Llagostera Vives (Spain) María José Martínez Sánchez	6	6

Final
(Czech Republic) Květa Peschke (Slovenia) Katarina Srebotnik	6^{5}	4
2	(Spain) Nuria Llagostera Vives (Spain) María José Martínez Sánchez	7	6

=== Top half ===
First round
(Turkey) İ Şenoğlu (Kazakhstan) Y Shvedova	5	3
(Belarus) V Azarenka (Russia) S Kuznetsova	7	6
(Germany) A-L Grönefeld (Switzerland) P Schnyder	4	4
(Latvia) L Dekmeijere (Italy) T Garbin	6	6
(Belarus) E Dzehalevich (Russia) A Kudryavtseva	6	6
6	(Russia) E Makarova (China) Z Yan	2	4
(United Kingdom) S Borwell (United States) R Kops-Jones	1	6^{3}
(Czech Republic) K Peschke (Slovenia) K Srebotnik	6	7
WC	(Romania) S Cîrstea (Russia) A Pavlyuchenkova	2	4
WC	(Australia) A Molik (Tunisia) S Sfar	6	6
(Chinese Taipei) Y-j Chan (China) J Zheng	6	6
7	(India) S Mirza (Spain) V Ruano Pascual	3	3

Second round
1	(Zimbabwe) C Black (United States) L Huber	7	6
(Belarus) V Azarenka (Russia) S Kuznetsova	6^{5}	1
(Latvia) L Dekmeijere (Italy) T Garbin	0	4
(Belarus) E Dzehalevich (Russia) A Kudryavtseva	6	6
3	(United States) L Raymond (Australia) R Stubbs	1	6	[7]
(Czech Republic) K Peschke (Slovenia) K Srebotnik	6	4	[10]
WC	(Australia) A Molik (Tunisia) S Sfar	1	3
(Chinese Taipei) Y-j Chan (China) J Zheng	6	6

Quarterfinals
1	(Zimbabwe) C Black (United States) L Huber	6	7
(Belarus) E Dzehalevich (Russia) A Kudryavtseva	0	6^{6}
(Czech Republic) K Peschke (Slovenia) K Srebotnik	5	6	[10]
(Chinese Taipei) Y-j Chan (China) J Zheng	7	2	[1]

Semifinals
1	(Zimbabwe) C Black (United States) L Huber	4	6	[9]
(Czech Republic) K Peschke (Slovenia) K Srebotnik	6	2	[11]

=== Bottom half ===
First round
5	(Russia) A Kleybanova (Italy) F Schiavone	6	6
(South Africa) N Grandin (United States) M Tu	3	2
(Spain) A Medina Garrigues (Denmark) C Wozniacki	5	6	[5]
(Israel) S Pe'er (Kazakhstan) G Voskoboeva	7	4	[10]
(Slovakia) D Hantuchová (Russia) E Vesnina	3	2
(Ukraine) A Bondarenko (Ukraine) K Bondarenko	6	6
8	(Russia) M Kirilenko (Poland) A Radwańska	6	6
(Uzbekistan) A Amanmuradova (Belarus) D Kustova	3	2
(Chinese Taipei) C-j Chuang (Belarus) O Govortsova	6	6
(Poland) K Jans (Poland) A Rosolska	3	2
(Czech Republic) I Benešová (Italy) F Pennetta	3	6	[1]
(Russia) V Dushevina (Australia) A Rodionova	6	3	[10]

Second round
5	(Russia) A Kleybanova (Italy) F Schiavone	6	3	[10]
(Israel) S Pe'er (Kazakhstan) G Voskoboeva	4	6	[5]
(Ukraine) A Bondarenko (Ukraine) K Bondarenko
4	(Russia) N Petrova (Australia) S Stosur	w/o
8	(Russia) M Kirilenko (Poland) A Radwańska	6	3	[7]
(Chinese Taipei) C-j Chuang (Belarus) O Govortsova	4	6	[10]
(Russia) V Dushevina (Australia) A Rodionova	1	6^{3}
2	(Spain) N Llagostera Vives (Spain) MJ Martínez Sánchez	6	7

Quarterfinals
5	(Russia) A Kleybanova (Italy) F Schiavone	7	5	[9]
4	(Russia) N Petrova (Australia) S Stosur	6^{4}	7	[11]
(Chinese Taipei) C-j Chuang (Belarus) O Govortsova	7	3	[8]
2	(Spain) N Llagostera Vives (Spain) MJ Martínez Sánchez	6^{7}	6	[10]

Semifinals
4	(Russia) N Petrova (Australia) S Stosur	2	4
2	(Spain) N Llagostera Vives (Spain) MJ Martínez Sánchez	6	6
