= 2008 Qatar Open – Singles =

Singles
- 2008 Qatar Open

Final
- Champion: (United Kingdom) Andy Murray
- Runner-up: (Switzerland) Stanislas Wawrinka
- Score: 6–4, 4–6, 6–2

Details
- Draw: 32 (4Q / 3WC)
- Seeds: 8

Events
Singles	Doubles
← 2007 ·	ATP Qatar Open	· 2009 →

Ivan Ljubičić was the defending champion, but lost in the semifinals to Stanislas Wawrinka.

Third-seeded Andy Murray won in the final 6–4, 4–6, 6–2, against unseeded Stanislas Wawrinka.

== Seeds ==
1. (Russia) Nikolay Davydenko (semifinals)
2. (Spain) Tommy Robredo (first round)
3. (United Kingdom) Andy Murray (champion)
4. (Croatia) Ivan Ljubičić (semifinals)
5. (Croatia) Ivo Karlović (first round)
6. (Germany) Philipp Kohlschreiber (quarterfinals)
7. (Russia) Igor Andreev (first round)
8. (Russia) Dmitry Tursunov (quarterfinals)

== Draw ==
=== Key ===
- Q = Qualifier
- WC = Wild card
- LL = Lucky loser
- Alt = Alternate
- SE = Special exempt
- PR = Protected ranking
- ITF = ITF entry
- JE = Junior exempt
- w/o = Walkover
- r = Retired
- d = Defaulted
- SR = Special ranking

=== Finals ===
Semifinals
1	(Russia) Nikolay Davydenko	4	3
3	(United Kingdom) Andy Murray	6	6
4	(Croatia) Ivan Ljubičić	6^{1}	4
(Switzerland) Stanislas Wawrinka	7^{7}	6

Final
3	(United Kingdom) Andy Murray	6	4	6
(Switzerland) Stanislas Wawrinka	4	6	2

=== Top half ===
First round
1	(Russia) N Davydenko	6	6
Q	(Germany) B Dorsch	3	0
(Italy) A Seppi	4	6	2
(France) F Santoro	6	1	6
(Germany) N Kiefer	6	6
Q	(France) S de Chaunac	4	3
(Spain) A Montañés	2	5
8	(Russia) D Tursunov	6	7
3	(United Kingdom) A Murray	6	6
(Belgium) O Rochus	0	2
WC	(Germany) R Schüttler	1	6	6
(Romania) A Pavel	6	2	0
WC	(Qatar) A Haji	1	1
(Germany) M Berrer	6	6
(Sweden) T Johansson	6	6
7	(Russia) I Andreev	1	0

Second round
1	(Russia) N Davydenko	6	6
(France) F Santoro	3	3
(Germany) N Kiefer
8	(Russia) D Tursunov	w/o
3	(United Kingdom) A Murray	1	6	6
WC	(Germany) R Schüttler	6	0	1
(Germany) M Berrer	3	5
(Sweden) T Johansson	6	7

Quarterfinals
1	(Russia) N Davydenko	7	6
8	(Russia) D Tursunov	5	3
3	(United Kingdom) A Murray	7^{7}	6
(Sweden) T Johansson	6^{4}	0

Semifinals
1	(Russia) N Davydenko	4	3
3	(United Kingdom) A Murray	6	6

=== Bottom half ===
First round
6	(Germany) P Kohlschreiber	6	6
(Spain) Ó Hernández	3	1
(Argentina) D Hartfield	6	3	6^{3}
(Italy) F Volandri	4	6	7^{7}
(Spain) S Ventura	6	3	4
(Serbia) J Tipsarević	3	6	6
(Austria) S Koubek	4	4
4	(Croatia) I Ljubičić	6	6
5	(Croatia) I Karlović	6^{2}	2
Q	(Belgium) C Rochus	7^{7}	6
(Switzerland) S Wawrinka	6	6
Q	(Spain) A Martín	2	2
WC	(Belarus) M Mirnyi	3	2
(South Korea) H-t Lee	6	6
(Argentina) A Calleri	6	6
2	(Spain) T Robredo	4	4

Second round
6	(Germany) P Kohlschreiber	6	6
(Italy) F Volandri	4	1
(Serbia) J Tipsarević
4	(Croatia) I Ljubičić	w/o
Q	(Belgium) C Rochus	2	5
(Switzerland) S Wawrinka	6	7
(South Korea) H-t Lee	3	1
(Argentina) A Calleri	6	6

Quarterfinals
6	(Germany) P Kohlschreiber	3	7^{7}	3
4	(Croatia) I Ljubičić	6	6^{4}	6
(Switzerland) S Wawrinka	6	6
(Argentina) A Calleri	3	0

Semifinals
4	(Croatia) I Ljubičić	6^{1}	4
(Switzerland) S Wawrinka	7^{7}	6
