= 2007 Qatar Open – Singles =

Singles
- 2007 Qatar Open

Final
- Champion: (Croatia) Ivan Ljubičić
- Runner-up: (United Kingdom) Andy Murray
- Score: 6–4, 6–4

Details
- Draw: 32 (4 Q / 3 WC )
- Seeds: 8

Events
Singles	Doubles
← 2006 ·	ATP Qatar Open	· 2008 →

Ivan Ljubičić defeated Andy Murray 6–4, 6–4 to win the 2007 Qatar Open singles event.

== Seeds ==
1. (Russia) Nikolay Davydenko (semifinals)
2. (Croatia) Ivan Ljubičić (champion)
3. (Cyprus) Marcos Baghdatis (second round)
4. (United Kingdom) Andy Murray (final)
5. (Russia) Mikhail Youzhny (quarterfinals)
6. (Sweden) Robin Söderling (semifinals)
7. (France) Sébastien Grosjean (first round)
8. (Switzerland) Stanislas Wawrinka (first round)

== Draw ==
=== Key ===
- Q = Qualifier
- WC = Wild card
- LL = Lucky loser
- Alt = Alternate
- SE = Special exempt
- PR = Protected ranking
- ITF = ITF entry
- JE = Junior exempt
- w/o = Walkover
- r = Retired
- d = Defaulted
- SR = Special ranking

=== Finals ===
Semifinals
1	(Russia) Nikolay Davydenko	5	2
4	(United Kingdom) Andy Murray	7	6
6	(Sweden) Robin Söderling	6	4	6^{7}
2	(Croatia) Ivan Ljubičić	2	6	7^{9}

Final
4	(United Kingdom) Andy Murray	4	4
2	(Croatia) Ivan Ljubičić	6	6

=== Section 1 ===
First round
1	(Russia) N Davydenko	7	6
(South Korea) Lee HT	5	4
(Spain) N Almagro	5	5
(Sweden) J Björkman	7	7
Q	(Italy) F Luzzi	5	6	7
(Austria) J Melzer	7	4	5
(Belgium) O Rochus	6	6
7	(France) S Grosjean	4	4
4	(United Kingdom) A Murray	4	6	6
(Italy) F Volandri	6	2	4
(Spain) A Martín	4	5
(Belgium) C Rochus	6	7
Q	(Switzerland) M Chiudinelli	6	6
Q	(Czech Republic) T Cakl	2	2
(Belarus) M Mirnyi	5	6	6
8	(Switzerland) S Wawrinka	7	4	4

Second round
1	(Russia) N Davydenko	6	6
(Sweden) J Björkman	4	3
Q	(Italy) F Luzzi	1	0
(Belgium) O Rochus	6	6
4	(United Kingdom) A Murray	6	6
(Belgium) C Rochus	1	3
Q	(Switzerland) M Chiudinelli	3	3
(Belarus) M Mirnyi	6	6

Quarterfinals
1	(Russia) N Davydenko	6	6
(Belgium) O Rochus	4	3
4	(United Kingdom) A Murray	2	6	6
(Belarus) M Mirnyi	6	2	2

Semifinals
1	(Russia) N Davydenko	5	2
4	(United Kingdom) A Murray	7	6

=== Section 2 ===
First round
6	(Sweden) R Söderling	6	6
(Belgium) K Vliegen	3	3
WC	(Italy) P Starace	6	5	5
(Spain) G García López	2	7	7
(Spain) R Ramírez Hidalgo	7^{7}	6
WC	(Qatar) S Khalfan	6^{5}	2
(Germany) P Kohlschreiber	4	5
3	(Cyprus) M Baghdatis	6	7
5	(Russia) M Youzhny	7	6
(Italy) D Bracciali	5	3
(Italy) A Seppi	3	4
(France) G Monfils	6	6
(Sweden) T Johansson	6^{5}	6^{1}
WC	(Morocco) Y El Aynaoui	7^{7}	7^{7}
Q	(Germany) D Gremelmayr	1	2
2	(Croatia) I Ljubičić	6	6

Second round
6	(Sweden) R Söderling	4	6	6
(Spain) G García López	6	0	3
(Spain) R Ramírez Hidalgo	0	2
3	(Cyprus) M Baghdatis	6	6
5	(Russia) M Youzhny	6	6
(France) G Monfils	4	2
WC	(Morocco) Y El Aynaoui	3	4
2	(Croatia) I Ljubičić	6	6

Quarterfinals
6	(Sweden) R Söderling	6	6
3	(Cyprus) M Baghdatis	3	2
5	(Russia) M Youzhny	6	6^{2}	6^{3}
2	(Croatia) I Ljubičić	2	7^{7}	7^{7}

Semifinals
6	(Sweden) R Söderling	6	4	6^{7}
2	(Croatia) I Ljubičić	3	6	7^{9}
