= 2009 Dubai Tennis Championships – Women's singles =

Women's singles
- 2009 Dubai Tennis Championships

Final
- Champion: (United States) Venus Williams
- Runner-up: (France) Virginie Razzano
- Score: 6–4, 6–2

Details
- Draw: 56
- Seeds: 16

Events
Singles	men	women
Doubles	men	women
- Dubai Tennis Championships

Venus Williams defeated Virginie Razzano in the final, 6–4, 6–2 to win the women's singles tennis title at the 2009 Dubai Tennis Championships.

Elena Dementieva was the defending champion, but lost in the quarterfinals to Venus Williams.

== Seeds ==
The top eight seeds receive a bye into the second round.

1. (United States) Serena Williams (semifinals)
2. (Russia) Dinara Safina (second round)
3. (Serbia) Jelena Janković (third round)
4. (Russia) Elena Dementieva (quarterfinals)
5. (Russia) Vera Zvonareva (quarterfinals)
6. (United States) Venus Williams (champion)
7. (Russia) Svetlana Kuznetsova (second round)
8. (Serbia) Ana Ivanovic (quarterfinals)
9. (Poland) Agnieszka Radwańska (first round)
10. (France) Alizé Cornet (third round)
11. (France) Marion Bartoli (third round)
12. (Slovakia) Dominika Cibulková (third round)
13. (China) Zheng Jie (third round)
14. (Spain) Anabel Medina Garrigues (third round)
15. (Russia) Anna Chakvetadze (first round)
16. (Estonia) Kaia Kanepi (semifinals)

== Draw ==
Key

- Q = Qualifier
- WC = Wild card
- LL = Lucky loser
- Alt = Alternate
- ITF = ITF entry
- PR = Protected ranking
- SR = Special ranking
- SE = Special exempt
- JE = Junior exempt
- JR = Junior Accelerator Programme entrant
- CO = College Accelerator Programme entrant
- NG = Next Gen Accelerator Program entrant
- w/o = Walkover
- r = Retired
- d = Defaulted

=== Finals ===
Quarterfinals
1	(United States) Serena Williams	6	6
8	(Serbia) Ana Ivanovic	4	4
4	(Russia) Elena Dementieva	3	3
6	(United States) Venus Williams	6	6
Q	(Russia) Elena Vesnina	3	5
16	(Estonia) Kaia Kanepi	6	7
5	(Russia) Vera Zvonareva	6^{7}	5
(France) Virginie Razzano	7	7

Semifinals
1	(United States) Serena Williams	1	6	6^{3}
6	(United States) Venus Williams	6	2	7
16	(Estonia) Kaia Kanepi	1	2
(France) Virginie Razzano	6	6

Final
6	(United States) Venus Williams	6	6
(France) Virginie Razzano	4	2

=== Top half ===
==== Section 1 ====
First round
(Chinese Taipei) Y-J Chan	4	4
(Italy) S Errani	6	6
(Australia) S Stosur	6	6
(Slovakia) M Rybáriková	4	3
Q	(Russia) A Rodionova	1	1
13	(China) J Zheng	6	6
9	(Poland) A Radwańska	4	3
Q	(Poland) U Radwańska	6	6
(Hungary) Á Szávay	6	2	3
LL	(France) C Pin	2	6	6
Q	(Russia) A Lapushchenkova	6	3	2
(Russia) A Kleybanova	3	6	6

Second round
1	(United States) S Williams	4	6	6
(Italy) S Errani	6	2	0
(Australia) S Stosur	6	5	5
13	(China) J Zheng	3	7	7
Q	(Poland) U Radwańska	7	5	0^{r}
LL	(France) C Pin	6^{6}	7	2
(Russia) A Kleybanova	5	4
8	(Serbia) A Ivanovic	7	6

Third round
1	(United States) S Williams	6	6
13	(China) J Zheng	4	2
LL	(France) C Pin	2	6^{5}
8	(Serbia) A Ivanovic	6	7

Quarterfinals
1	(United States) S Williams	6	6
8	(Serbia) A Ivanovic	4	4

==== Section 2 ====
First round
(Ukraine) M Koryttseva	1	4
(Austria) S Bammer	6	6
(Belarus) O Govortsova	4	3
(Ukraine) A Bondarenko	6	6
LL	(Slovenia) A Klepač	3	1
14	(Spain) A Medina Garrigues	6	6
10	(France) A Cornet	6	6
(Germany) A-L Grönefeld	4	1
Q	(Germany) J Schruff	6	2	6
(Czech Republic) P Kvitová	3	6	4
(Russia) M Kirilenko	2	4
(Russia) A Pavlyuchenkova	6	6

Second round
4	(Russia) E Dementieva	7	6
(Austria) S Bammer	5	2
(Ukraine) A Bondarenko	2	5
14	(Spain) A Medina Garrigues	6	7
10	(France) A Cornet	6	6
Q	(Germany) J Schruff	1	2
(Russia) A Pavlyuchenkova	0	1
6	(United States) V Williams	6	6

Third round
4	(Russia) E Dementieva	6	6
14	(Spain) A Medina Garrigues	1	3
10	(France) A Cornet	3	2
6	(United States) V Williams	6	6

Quarterfinals
4	(Russia) E Dementieva	3	3
6	(United States) V Williams	6	6

=== Bottom half ===
==== Section 3 ====
First round
Q	(Russia) E Vesnina	1	6	6
(China) N Li	6	4	4
(Bulgaria) T Pironkova	6	6
Q	(Ukraine) V Kutuzova	2	3
(Romania) S Cîrstea	4	2
12	(Slovakia) D Cibulková	6	6
16	(Estonia) K Kanepi	2	6	6
Q	(Austria) T Paszek	6	2	0
WC	(India) S Mirza	7	6
(Russia) E Makarova	5	2
(China) S Peng	6	5	2
(Romania) M Niculescu	3	7	6

Second round
7	(Russia) S Kuznetsova	4	6	0
Q	(Russia) E Vesnina	6	3	6
(Bulgaria) T Pironkova	6^{5}	4
12	(Slovakia) D Cibulková	7	6
16	(Estonia) K Kanepi	7	6
WC	(India) S Mirza	5	2
(Romania) M Niculescu	3	2
3	(Serbia) J Janković	6	6

Third round
Q	(Russia) E Vesnina	4	6	4
12	(Slovakia) D Cibulková	6	1	0^{r}
16	(Estonia) K Kanepi	6	7
3	(Serbia) J Janković	2	5

Quarterfinals
Q	(Russia) E Vesnina	3	5
16	(Estonia) K Kanepi	6	7

==== Section 4 ====
First round
WC	(Russia) V Dushevina	2	6	6
Q	(China) Z Yan	6	4	3
(Italy) F Schiavone	6	6
(Australia) C Dellacqua	1	1
(Japan) A Sugiyama	0	6	6^{6}
11	(France) M Bartoli	6	4	7
15	(Russia) A Chakvetadze	5	2
LL	(Japan) A Morita	7	6
WC	(Switzerland) S Vögele	5	2
(Slovakia) D Hantuchová	7	6
(Ukraine) K Bondarenko	5	2
(France) V Razzano	7	6

Second round
5	(Russia) V Zvonareva	6	6
WC	(Russia) V Dushevina	0	3
(Italy) F Schiavone	6^{5}	6	3
11	(France) M Bartoli	7	3	6
LL	(Japan) A Morita	6^{1}	2
(Slovakia) D Hantuchová	7	6
(France) V Razzano	6	6
2	(Russia) D Safina	4	2

Third round
5	(Russia) V Zvonareva	5
11	(France) M Bartoli	2	r
(Slovakia) D Hantuchová	2	6	2
(France) V Razzano	6	1	6

Quarterfinals
5	(Russia) V Zvonareva	6^{7}	5
(France) V Razzano	7	7
