= 2009 Dubai Tennis Championships – Men's doubles =

Men's doubles
- 2009 Dubai Tennis Championships

Final
- Champions: (South Africa) Rik de Voest (Russia) Dmitry Tursunov
- Runners-up: (Czech Republic) Martin Damm (Sweden) Robert Lindstedt
- Score: 4–6, 6–3, [10–5]

Details
- Draw: 16
- Seeds: 4

Events
Singles	men	women
Doubles	men	women
← 2008 ·	Dubai Tennis Championships	· 2010 →

Mahesh Bhupathi and Mark Knowles were the defending champions, but lost in the quarterfinals to Rik de Voest and Dmitry Tursunov.

Rik de Voest and Dmitry Tursunov won the final against Martin Damm and Robert Lindstedt, 4–6, 6–3, [10–5].

== Seeds ==
1. (Canada) Daniel Nestor / (Serbia) Nenad Zimonjić (first round)
2. (India) Mahesh Bhupathi / (The Bahamas) Mark Knowles (quarterfinals)
3. (Czech Republic) Lukáš Dlouhý / (India) Leander Paes (first round)
4. (Israel) Andy Ram / (Zimbabwe) Kevin Ullyett (first round)

== Draw ==
Key

- Q = Qualifier
- WC = Wild card
- LL = Lucky loser
- Alt = Alternate
- ITF = ITF entry
- PR = Protected ranking
- SR = Special ranking
- SE = Special exempt
- JE = Junior exempt
- JR = Junior Accelerator Programme entrant
- CO = College Accelerator Programme entrant
- NG = Next Gen Accelerator Program entrant
- w/o = Walkover
- r = Retired
- d = Defaulted

=== Draw ===
First round
1	(Canada) D Nestor (Serbia) N Zimonjić	4	4
(Austria) J Knowle (Austria) J Melzer	6	6
(Poland) M Matkowski (Germany) R Schüttler	6	6
(Germany) C Kas (Germany) P Kohlschreiber	3	2
3	(Czech Republic) L Dlouhý (India) L Paes	4	6	8
(Italy) S Bolelli (Croatia) I Karlović	6	2	[10]
WC	(India) P Amritraj (Pakistan) A-u-H Qureshi	6^{4}	5
(Czech Republic) M Damm (Sweden) R Lindstedt	7^{7}	7
(Serbia) J Tipsarević (Serbia) V Troicki	3	4
(South Africa) J Coetzee (South Africa) W Moodie	6	6
(Spain) D Ferrer (Russia) M Safin	6	3	[10]
4	(Israel) A Ram (Zimbabwe) K Ullyett	3	6	[8]
(South Africa) R de Voest (Russia) D Tursunov	6	6
(Russia) I Andreev (Russia) M Youzhny	3	2
WC	(United Arab Emirates) HA Janahi (United Arab Emirates) M-N Al Baloushi	3	1
2	(India) M Bhupathi (The Bahamas) M Knowles	6	6

Quarterfinals
(Austria) J Knowle (Austria) J Melzer	6	4	[10]
(Poland) M Matkowski (Germany) R Schüttler	4	6	[12]
(Italy) S Bolelli (Croatia) I Karlović	2	6^{2}
(Czech Republic) M Damm (Sweden) R Lindstedt	6	7^{7}
(South Africa) J Coetzee (South Africa) W Moodie	7	4	[10]
(Spain) D Ferrer (Russia) M Safin	5	6	[12]
(South Africa) R de Voest (Russia) D Tursunov	7^{7}	6
2	(India) M Bhupathi (The Bahamas) M Knowles	6^{4}	2

Semifinals
(Poland) M Matkowski (Germany) R Schüttler	4	4
(Czech Republic) M Damm (Sweden) R Lindstedt	6	6
(Spain) D Ferrer (Russia) M Safin	7	3	[5]
(South Africa) R de Voest (Russia) D Tursunov	5	6	[10]

Final
(Czech Republic) M Damm (Sweden) R Lindstedt	6	3	[5]
(South Africa) R de Voest (Russia) D Tursunov	4	6	[10]
