= 2009 Qatar Open – Singles =

Singles
- 2009 Qatar Open

Final
- Champion: (United Kingdom) Andy Murray
- Runner-up: (United States) Andy Roddick
- Score: 6–4, 6–2

Details
- Draw: 32 (4 Q / 3 WC )
- Seeds: 8

Events
Singles	Doubles
← 2008 ·	ATP Qatar Open	· 2010 →

Andy Murray was the defending champion, and won in the final 6–4, 6–2 against Andy Roddick.

== Seeds ==
1. (Spain) Rafael Nadal (quarterfinals)
2. (Switzerland) Roger Federer (semifinals)
3. (United Kingdom) Andy Murray (champion)
4. (United States) Andy Roddick (final)
5. (France) Gaël Monfils (semifinals)
6. (Russia) Igor Andreev (first round)
7. (Russia) Dmitry Tursunov (first round)
8. (Germany) Philipp Kohlschreiber (quarterfinals)

== Draw ==
=== Key ===
- Q = Qualifier
- WC = Wild card
- LL = Lucky loser
- Alt = Alternate
- SE = Special exempt
- PR = Protected ranking
- ITF = ITF entry
- JE = Junior exempt
- w/o = Walkover
- r = Retired
- d = Defaulted
- SR = Special ranking

=== Finals ===
Semifinals
5/WC	(France) Gaël Monfils	6^{1}	6	3
4	(United States) Andy Roddick	7^{7}	3	6
3	(United Kingdom) Andy Murray	6^{6}	6	6
2	(Switzerland) Roger Federer	7^{8}	2	2

Final
4	(United States) Andy Roddick	4	2
3	(United Kingdom) Andy Murray	6	6

=== Top half ===
First round
1	(Spain) R Nadal	6	6
(France) F Santoro	0	1
Q	(Slovakia) K Beck	4	6	7
Q	(Poland) M Przysiężny	6	4	5
WC	(Qatar) A Haji	0	3
(France) N Devilder	6	6
(Czech Republic) J Hernych	2	2
5/WC	(France) G Monfils	6	6
4	(United States) A Roddick	6	6
(Spain) I Navarro	1	3
(Argentina) D Junqueira	1	2
WC	(France) A Clément	6	6
(Serbia) V Troicki	4	2
(Romania) V Hănescu	6	6
(Russia) M Youzhny	4	6	6
6	(Russia) I Andreev	6	3	4

Second round
1	(Spain) R Nadal	6	6
Q	(Slovakia) K Beck	1	2
(France) N Devilder	5	6^{4}
5/WC	(France) G Monfils	7	7^{7}
4	(United States) A Roddick	6	7
WC	(France) A Clément	3	5
(Romania) V Hănescu	6	6
(Russia) M Youzhny	2	4

Quarterfinals
1	(Spain) R Nadal	4	4
5/WC	(France) G Monfils	6	6
4	(United States) A Roddick	6	6
(Romania) V Hănescu	3	2

Semifinals
5/WC	(France) G Monfils	6^{1}	6	3
4	(United States) A Roddick	7^{7}	3	6

=== Bottom half ===
First round
7	(Russia) D Tursunov	6	3	4
Q	(Austria) A Peya	2	6	6
(Ukraine) S Stakhovsky	2	6	7^{7}
(Belgium) C Rochus	6	3	6^{3}
(Germany) P Petzschner	7^{7}	6
(France) J Chardy	6^{2}	3
(Spain) A Montañés	2	4
3	(United Kingdom) A Murray	6	6
8	(Germany) P Kohlschreiber	6	6
Q	(Switzerland) M Chiudinelli	4	3
(Spain) O Hernández	1	7^{7}	6^{5}
(Belgium) K Vliegen	6	6^{4}	7^{7}
(Italy) A Seppi	6	6
(Germany) D Gremelmayr	4	2
(Italy) P Starace	2	2
2	(Switzerland) R Federer	6	6

Second round
Q	(Austria) A Peya	5	3
(Ukraine) S Stakhovsky	7	6
(Germany) P Petzschner	2	4
3	(United Kingdom) A Murray	6	6
8	(Germany) P Kohlschreiber	6	6^{4}	6
(Belgium) K Vliegen	4	7^{7}	4
(Italy) A Seppi	3	3
2	(Switzerland) R Federer	6	6

Quarterfinals
(Ukraine) S Stakhovsky	4	2
3	(United Kingdom) A Murray	6	6
8	(Germany) P Kohlschreiber	2	6^{6}
2	(Switzerland) R Federer	6	7^{8}

Semifinals
3	(United Kingdom) A Murray	6^{6}	6	6
2	(Switzerland) R Federer	7^{8}	2	2

== Qualifying ==
=== Seeds ===
1. (Slovakia) Karol Beck (qualified)
2. (Austria) Alexander Peya (qualified)
3. (Spain) Pere Riba (first round)
4. (Spain) Miguel Angel Lopez Jaen (qualifying competition)
5. (Morocco) Lamine Ouahab (qualifying competition)
6. (Poland) Łukasz Kubot (qualifying competition)
7. (Germany) Matthias Bachinger (second round)
8. (Italy) Giancarlo Petrazzuolo (second round)

=== Qualifiers ===
1. (Slovakia) Karol Beck
2. (Austria) Alexander Peya
3. (Switzerland) Marco Chiudinelli
4. (Poland) Michał Przysiężny

=== Draw ===
==== First qualifier ====
First round
1	(Slovakia) Karol Beck	7	4	6
(Kuwait) Mohammad Ghareeb	5	6	1
(Slovakia) Ivo Klec	6	7^{7}
(Romania) Marius Copil	4	6^{4}
WC	(Qatar) Jaber Nouh	1	0
(Serbia) Nenad Zimonjić	6	6
(Czech Republic) Jaroslav Levinský	0^{r}
5	(Morocco) Lamine Ouahab	5

Second round
1	(Slovakia) Karol Beck	2	6	7
(Slovakia) Ivo Klec	6	3	5
(Serbia) Nenad Zimonjić	7	3	3
5	(Morocco) Lamine Ouahab	5	6	6

Qualifying competition
1	(Slovakia) Karol Beck	7	6
5	(Morocco) Lamine Ouahab	5	3

==== Second qualifier ====
First round
2	(Austria) Alexander Peya	6	6
(Russia) Artur Chernov	1	3
(Ukraine) Sergei Bubka	6	6
(United Kingdom) Gregory Howe	2	0
(Italy) Simone Vagnozzi	6	6
WC	(Qatar) Amer Mezri	0	1
(Germany) Tobias Kamke	7^{7}	2	1
6	(Poland) Łukasz Kubot	6^{4}	6	6

Second round
2	(Austria) Alexander Peya	7^{7}	6
(Ukraine) Sergei Bubka	6^{4}	4
(Italy) Simone Vagnozzi	6	2	6^{5}
6	(Poland) Łukasz Kubot	2	6	7^{7}

Qualifying competition
2	(Austria) Alexander Peya	6	7^{7}
6	(Poland) Łukasz Kubot	3	6^{3}

==== Third qualifier ====
First round
3	(Spain) Pere Riba	4	4
(Slovakia) Michal Mertiňák	6	6
(Czech Republic) Jaroslav Pospíšil	6	6
WC	(Kuwait) Abdullah Maqdes	0	4
(Austria) Rainer Eitzinger	7	5	2
(Switzerland) Marco Chiudinelli	5	7	6
WC	(Qatar) Moussa Shanan	0	0
8	(Italy) Giancarlo Petrazzuolo	6	6

Second round
(Slovakia) Michal Mertiňák	3	3
(Czech Republic) Jaroslav Pospíšil	6	6
(Switzerland) Marco Chiudinelli	6	6
8	(Italy) Giancarlo Petrazzuolo	3	1

Qualifying competition
(Czech Republic) Jaroslav Pospíšil	2	2
(Switzerland) Marco Chiudinelli	6	6

==== Fourth qualifier ====
First round
4	(Spain) Miguel Ángel López Jaén	6	6
(Kuwait) Ali Ghareeb	1	1
(Spain) Marc López	2	2
(Germany) Christopher Kas	6	6
(Russia) Dmitri Sitak	4	2
(Poland) Michał Przysiężny	6	6
(Lithuania) Ričardas Berankis	4	2
7	(Germany) Matthias Bachinger	6	6

Second round
4	(Spain) Miguel Ángel López Jaén	7^{7}	6
(Germany) Christopher Kas	6^{5}	1
(Poland) Michał Przysiężny	6	6
7	(Germany) Matthias Bachinger	1	4

Qualifying competition
4	(Spain) Miguel Ángel López Jaén	6	3	1
(Poland) Michał Przysiężny	0	6	6
