= 2010 Dubai Tennis Championships =

- Date: February 22–28 (men); February 14–20 (women)
- Edition: 18th (men) / 10th (women)
- Category: ATP World Tour 500 (men); WTA Premier 5 event (woman)
- Location: Dubai, United Arab Emirates
- Venue: Aviation Club Tennis Centre

Champions

Men's singles
- (Serbia) Novak Djokovic

Women's singles
- (United States) Venus Williams

Men's doubles
- (Sweden) Simon Aspelin / (Australia) Paul Hanley

Women's doubles
- (Spain) Nuria Llagostera Vives / (Spain) María José Martínez Sánchez
- Dubai Tennis Championships

The 2010 Barclays Dubai Tennis Championships was a 500 Series event on the 2010 ATP World Tour and a Premier 5 event on the 2010 WTA Tour. Both of the events took place at The Aviation Club Tennis Centre in Dubai, United Arab Emirates. The women's tournament took place from February 14 to February 20, 2010, while the men's tournament took place from February 22 to February 28, 2010 (it was planned, that the tournament would end on February 27, 2010, but due to rain the final was suspended). Novak Djokovic and Venus Williams won the singles titles.

== Finals ==
=== Men's singles ===
(Serbia) Novak Djokovic defeated (Russia) Mikhail Youzhny, 7–5, 5–7, 6–3

- It was Djokovic's first title of the year and 17th of his career. It was his second consecutive title at the event.

=== Women's singles ===
(United States) Venus Williams defeated (Belarus) Victoria Azarenka, 6–3, 7–5

- It was Williams' first title of the year, 42nd title of her career, and her second consecutive title of the event.

=== Men's doubles ===
(Sweden) Simon Aspelin / (Australia) Paul Hanley defeated (Czech Republic) Lukáš Dlouhý / (India) Leander Paes, 6–2, 6–3

=== Women's doubles ===
(Spain) Nuria Llagostera Vives / (Spain) María José Martínez Sánchez defeated (Czech Republic) Květa Peschke / (Slovenia) Katarina Srebotnik, 7–6^{(7–5)}, 6–4

== WTA entrants ==
=== Seeds ===
Country	Player	Rank^{1}	Seed
DEN	Caroline Wozniacki	3	1
RUS	Svetlana Kuznetsova	4	2
USA	Venus Williams	5	3
BLR	Victoria Azarenka	6	4
RUS	Elena Dementieva	7	5
SRB	Jelena Janković	8	6
POL	Agnieszka Radwańska	9	7
CHN	Li Na	10	8
AUS	Samantha Stosur	11	9
ITA	Flavia Pennetta	12	10
FRA	Marion Bartoli	13	11
RUS	Vera Zvonareva	14	12
BEL	Yanina Wickmayer	15	13
ITA	Francesca Schiavone	18	14
RUS	Nadia Petrova	19	15
CHN	Zheng Jie	20	16

- ^{1} Rankings as of February 8, 2010.

=== Other entrants ===
The following players received wildcards into the main draw:

- (Russia) Maria Kirilenko
- (Italy) Flavia Pennetta
- (Tunisia) Selima Sfar
- (Switzerland) Stefanie Vögele

The following players received entry from the qualifying draw:

- (Chinese Taipei) Chan Yung-jan
- (Belgium) Kirsten Flipkens
- (Germany) Anna-Lena Grönefeld
- (Russia) Regina Kulikova
- (Russia) Ekaterina Makarova
- (Russia) Vesna Manasieva
- (Australia) Alicia Molik
- (Latvia) Anastasija Sevastova

The following player received the lucky loser spot:

- (Italy) Alberta Brianti

== ATP entrants ==
=== Seeds ===
Athlete	Nationality	Ranking*	Seeding
Roger Federer	Switzerland	1	1
Novak Djokovic	Serbia	2	2
Andy Murray	(United Kingdom) Great Britain	4	3
Nikolay Davydenko	Russia	6	4
Jo-Wilfried Tsonga	France	9	5
Marin Čilić	Croatia	10	6
Mikhail Youzhny	Russia	15	7
Gilles Simon	France	16	8

- Rankings as of February 15, 2010

=== Other entrants ===
The following players received wildcards into the main draw:

- (Kuwait) Mohammed Ghareeb
- (Germany) Rainer Schüttler
- (France) Jo-Wilfried Tsonga

The following players received entry from the qualifying draw:

- (India) Somdev Devvarman
- (Austria) Stefan Koubek
- (Russia) Igor Kunitsyn
- (Germany) Björn Phau

The following player received the lucky loser spot:

- (Czech Republic) Jan Hernych
