= 2007 Qatar Open =

2007 Qatar ExxonMobil Open
- Date: 1–6 January 2007
- Edition: 15th
- Category: International Series
- Draw: 32S / 16D
- Surface: Hard / outdoor
- Location: Doha, Qatar

Champions

Singles
- (Croatia) Ivan Ljubičić

Doubles
- (Russia) Mikhail Youzhny / (Serbia) Nenad Zimonjić
- ATP Qatar Open

The 2007 Qatar Open, known as the 2007 Qatar ExxonMobil Open, for sponsorship reasons, was a men's ATP Tour tennis tournament held in Doha, Qatar from 1 January until 6 January 2007. It was the 15th edition of the Qatar Open.

The tournament saw second-seeded Ivan Ljubičić claim his first of two tournaments this year, and also saw him temporarily lead the ATP race.

== Finals ==
=== Singles ===
(Croatia) Ivan Ljubičić defeated (United Kingdom) Andy Murray, 6–4, 6–4

=== Doubles ===
(Russia) Mikhail Youzhny / (Serbia) Nenad Zimonjić defeated (Czech Republic) Martin Damm / (India) Leander Paes, 6–1, 7–6^{(7–3)}
