= 2009 Qatar Open =

- Date: 5–10 January 2009
- Edition: 17th
- Category: ATP World Tour 250 series
- Draw: 32S / 16D
- Prize money: $1,110,250
- Surface: Hard / outdoor
- Location: Doha, Qatar

Champions

Singles
- (United Kingdom) Andy Murray

Doubles
- (Spain) Marc López / (Spain) Rafael Nadal
- ATP Qatar Open

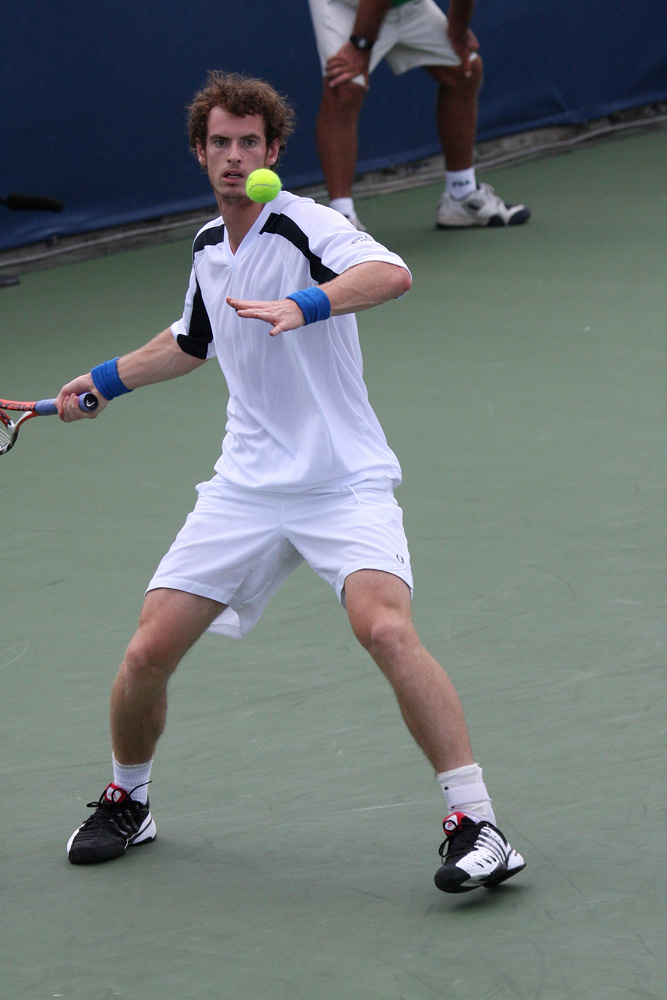
Singles defending champion Andy Murray retained his title at this tournament, defeating Andy Roddick in the final.

The 2009 Qatar Open, known as the 2009 Qatar ExxonMobil Open for sponsorship reasons, was a tennis tournament played on outdoor hard courts. It was the 17th edition of the Qatar ExxonMobil Open, and part of the ATP World Tour 250 series of the 2009 ATP World Tour. It took place at the Khalifa International Tennis Complex in Doha, Qatar, from January 5 through January 10, 2009. The event offered prize money of US$183,000 for the winner, as well as 250 ranking points.

The singles field was headlined by world No. 1 Rafael Nadal, world No. 2 Roger Federer, world No. 3 Andy Murray, and world No. 8 Andy Roddick.

== Finals ==
=== Singles ===
(United Kingdom) Andy Murray defeated (United States) Andy Roddick, 6–4, 6–2

=== Doubles ===
(Spain) Marc López / (Spain) Rafael Nadal defeated (Canada) Daniel Nestor / (Serbia) Nenad Zimonjić, 4–6, 6–4, [10–8]

== Review ==
Day by day summaries of the men's singles and doubles events. The singles draw is composed of 32 players, with 8 of these players seeded, while the doubles draw features 16 players, 4 of which are seeded.

=== Day one ===
Fifth seed Frenchman Gaël Monfils was the first player to reach the second round in the singles event with a straightforward 6–2, 6–2 victory over 99th ranked Czech player Jan Hernych. His next opponent will be fellow countryman Nicolas Devilder who overcame home wildcard Abdulla Haji 6–0, 6–3 The no. 4 seed, Andy Roddick had a comfortable 6–1, 6–3 win against Iván Navarro. In other first round matches completed on day one, Victor Hănescu won his match against Viktor Troicki, the Romanian overcoming the Serbian currently ranked eight places below him in the world rankings at #56 and Italian Andreas Seppi overcame the German Denis Gremelmayr by the same scoreline. The match between Sergiy Stakhovsky (who had just entered the top 100 at #93) and Christophe Rochus became the first in the tournament to last three sets, Stakhovsky coming out on top 2–6, 6–3, 7–6. Philipp Petzschner won his opening match against Frenchman Jérémy Chardy 7–6, 6–3.

Several of the first round doubles matches were also completed. Spanish wildcards and new partnership Marc López and world no. 1 singles player Rafael Nadal overcame compatriots Óscar Hernández and Albert Montañés 6–3, 6–3 in just over 1 hour. They set up a quarter-final match with fourth-seeded Germans Christopher Kas and Philipp Kohlschreiber who had beaten British pair Ross Hutchins and Andy Murray (who was also due to play Montañés in the singles tournament) 7–5, 6–4. Home-favourite Abdulla Haji, partnering Lamine Ouahab of Algeria, lost for the second time in the day, 6–0, 6–2 against Fabrice Santoro and Mikhail Youzhny. Second seeded South African duo Jeff Coetzee and Wesley Moodie took three sets to beat Igor Andreev and Jaroslav Levinský 4–6, 6–2, 10–1 on the Champions tiebreak. In the final match of the day, Dmitry Tursunov and Łukasz Kubot overcame the challenge of Serbian Michal Mertiňák and Italian Potito Starace 6–2, 6–2.

- Seeded players out (singles): None
- Seeded players out (doubles): None

=== Day two ===
Defending champion and no. 3 seed Andy Murray, fresh from his win in the Abu Dhabi exhibition event, made a successful start to his title defence, defeating Spaniard and ATP no. 42 Albert Montañés 6–2, 6–4. Murray broke twice for a 5–1 lead and went 4–0 up in the second set with two further breaks and, despite an inconsistent performance, he managed to win the match. He next faces a match against Philipp Petzschner. Wildcard Arnaud Clément of Spain advanced to a second round match against Andy Roddick after overcoming Argentine player Diego Junqueira 6–1, 6–2. In the clash of the Russians, Mikhail Youzhny edged out 6th seed Igor Andreev 4–6, 6–3, 6–4, with a match against Victor Hănescu to come in round two. Qualifier Alexander Peya, ranked at #148, scored a surprise victory over no. 7 seed, Russian Dmitry Tursunov 2–6, 6–3, 6–4. He set up a clash with Sergiy Stakhovsky in the second round. Second seed and former world no. 1 Roger Federer made a strong start to his ATP Tour campaign, beating Potito Starace in straight sets 6–2, 6–2 and lining up a meeting with Andreas Seppi for a place in the quarter-finals. Top seeded Spaniard Rafael Nadal also had a comfortable passage into round two, dropping only 1 game in a 6–0, 6–1 thrashing of veteran Fabrice Santoro, who was still ranked at #51 but couldn't match Nadal's power. Nadal received his 2008 ATP World Tour Champion Trophy before the match, awarded to him for finishing on top of the world rankings at the end of 2008. In other matches, Belgian Kristof Vliegen reached the second round and a meeting with German Philipp Kohlschreiber with a 6–1, 6–7, 7–6 against Óscar Hernández. No. 8 seed Kohlschreiber had earlier won his match against Swiss qualifier Marco Chiudinelli 6–4, 6–3.

The doubles event continued on day two, with an early result seeing Victor Hănescu, partnered by American James Cerretani, beat Victor Troicki for the second time in two days. Troicki who had also been beaten by Hănescu in the singles event, lost 6–4, 6–4, accompanied by Andreas Seppi. Top seeds Daniel Nestor from Canada and Serbia's Nenad Zimonjić easily progressed, losing just 4 games in a 6–3, 6–1defeat of French duo Arnaud Clément and Nicolas Devilder who had both reached round two of the singles draw. The quarterfinal line-up was completed by Philipp Petzschner and Alexander Peya who knocked out third seeds Mariusz Fyrstenberg and Marcin Matkowski 6–1, 7–6

- Seeded players out (singles): Igor Andreev, Dmitry Tursunov
- Seeded players out (doubles): Mariusz Fyrstenberg/Marcin Matkowski

=== Day three ===
The second round in the singles draw began on day three with the top five seeds in action. In the first match of the days session, Victor Hănescu reached the quarter-finals with a 6–2, 6–4 victory against Mikhail Youzhny. Andy Murray took the court second and defeated Philipp Petzschner 6–2, 6–4 to take another step towards retaining his title, followed quickly after by world #1 Rafael Nadal, who defeated Karol Beck 6–1, 6–2 in 61 minutes. Murray next plays Ukrainian Sergiy Stakhovsky, who defeated qualifier Alexander Peya 7–5, 6–3. 5th-seeded wildcard Gaël Monfils was also victorious 7–5, 7–6 against fellow Frenchman Nicolas Devilder and will next play Nadal. 8th seeded Philipp Kohlschreiber beat Kristof Vliegen 6–4, 6–7(4), 6–4 and he was due to face Roger Federer who beat Andreas Seppi 6–3, 6–3. In the final match of the day, fourth seeded Andy Roddick beat wildcard Arnaud Clément 6–3, 7–5.

In doubles, the quarter-finals began with Mikhail Youzhny playing his second match of the day partnering Fabrice Santoro against Jeff Coetzee and Wesley Moodie for a place in the semi-finals. Youzhny and Santoro shocked the second seeds 7–5, 7–6 to book their semi-final place. About 15 minutes later, top seed and ten-times Grand Slam doubles finalists Daniel Nestor and Nenad Zimonjić (twice together) started their quarter-final match with Łukasz Kubot and Dmitry Tursunov, emerging victorious 7–5, 6–4. Third seeds Christopher Kas and Philipp Kohlschreiber were also knocked out of the tournament at the quarter-final stage, losing to Spanish wildcards Marc López and Rafael Nadal. Philipp Kohlschreiber had won the tournament last year with Czech David Škoch.

- Seeded players out (singles): None
- Seeded players out (doubles): Jeff Coetzee/Wesley Moodie, Christopher Kas/Philipp Kohlschreiber

=== Day four ===
All quarter-final matches in the men's draw were completed on day four. Andy Roddick started off the action with his best performance of the week in a 6–3, 6–2 victory over Victor Hănescu. The second match of the day produced the biggest surprise of the event, as #5 seed Gaël Monfils routed world #1 Rafael Nadal 6-4 6–4, facing only one break point. He was followed by world #2 Roger Federer, who was heavily tested by Philipp Kohlschreiber, coming back from 5-1 and 6–3 in the tiebreak to win 6–2, 7–6, after having led the German 6-2 4–1. The day ended with world #4 and defending champion Andy Murray cruising to a 6–4, 6–2 victory over Sergiy Stakhovsky in a repeat of his victory over the Ukrainian in the US Open junior's final. Murray and Federer knew they would meet for the third tournament in a row.

In the doubles, #1 team Daniel Nestor & Nenad Zimonjić advanced to the final with a 6–1, 6-7(8), 10–3 victory over James Cerretani & Victor Hănescu. Their opponents are Marc López & Rafael Nadal, who narrowly defeated Fabrice Santoro & Mikhail Youzhny 1–6, 7–6, 11–9.

- Seeded players out (singles): Rafael Nadal, Philipp Kohlschreiber
- Seeded players out (doubles): None

=== Day five ===
The two singles semi-finals were played on day five. Gaël Monfils was unable to continue his hot streak from the previous day's play, losing to Andy Roddick 7–6, 3–6, 6–3, after serving for the first set. The second semifinal saw the very anticipated matchup between defending champ Andy Murray and #2 Roger Federer. The match didn't disappoint fans, seeing plenty of memorable points, with the Brit prevailing 6–7, 6–2, 6–2, even though Federer had 3 consecutive break points early in the second set and Murray received medical attention on his back in the third. The match ended with Federer smashing a low overhead into the net. It was the third consecutive official time that Murray prevailed, with Murray also winning an exhibition match last week; Murray extended his head to head lead to 5–2, and goes into his final with a 5–2 lead over Roddick.

In the doubles final, the world #1 team of Daniel Nestor and Nenad Zimonjić faced singles world no. 1 Rafael Nadal and partner Marc López. Nestor and Zimonjić, the ATP World Tour Champions for 2008, were bidding for the seventh doubles title as a partnership. Nestor had previously won the title at Doha with Mark Knowles in 1996 and 2001. On the opposite side, Nadal and López were teaming up for the first time. Nadal had won four of his last seven doubles finals while López was appearing in his second ATP doubles final. In the final, López dropped his serve twice in the opening set but in the second, a single break sufficed for Nadal and López to level the match, from Nestor in the third game. In the deciding champions tiebreak (first to ten points), Zimonjić and Nestor led 6–5 but López and Nadal won 5 of the last seven points to seal a 4–6, 6–4, 10–8 victory.

- Seeded players out (singles): Gaël Monfils, Roger Federer
- Seeded players out (doubles): Daniel Nestor & Nenad Zimonjić

=== Day six ===
The only match to take place on the final day of the tournament was the singles final. World no. 4 and third seeded Briton Andy Murray took on American Andy Roddick. Despite initial fears from Murray that he would be unfit to play after suffering from a back injury, he recovered enough to participate. The final started with four service holds before Murray broke Roddick in the fifth game for a 3–2 lead. This was followed by another in the seventh game and Murray sealed the set. In the second, Roddick just about held his opening service game but was broken in the third game of the set and then again two games later. Holding a 5–2 lead, Murray fell behind 0–30 on serve and had break point against him. However, he regained his composure and served out to win the match. In winning the tournament, Murray won his ninth career ATP title and defended the title he won in 2008.

- Seeded players out (singles): Andy Roddick
