= Regina Kulikova =

Russian tennis player

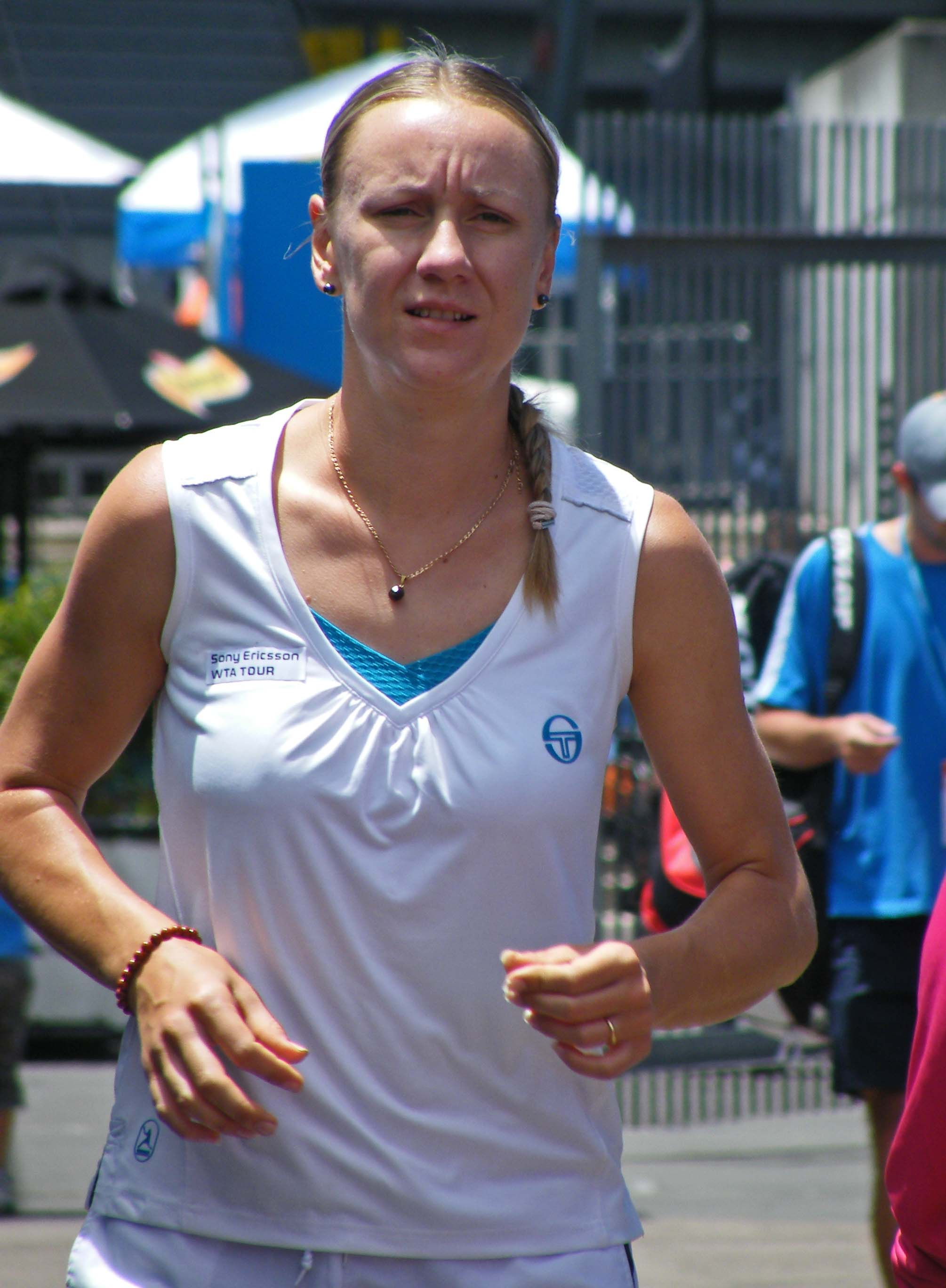
- Full name: Regina Aleksandrovna Kulikova
- Country (sports): Russia
- Residence: Biel, Switzerland
- Born: 30 January 1989 (age 36); Almaty, Kazakhstan
- Height: 1.83 m (6 ft 0 in)
- Turned pro: 2004
- Retired: 2014
- Plays: Right (two-handed backhand)
- Prize money: $438,568

Singles
- Career record: 192–84
- Career titles: 13 ITF
- Highest ranking: No. 65 (3 May 2010)

Grand Slam singles results
- Australian Open: 2R (2011)
- French Open: 1R (2010)
- Wimbledon: 3R (2009, 2010)
- US Open: 1R (2010)

Doubles
- Career record: 20–11
- Career titles: 2 ITF
- Highest ranking: No. 226 (16 May 2011)

Grand Slam doubles results
- French Open: 2R (2010)
- Wimbledon: 1R (2010)

Regina Aleksandrovna Kulikova (Russian: Регина Александровна Куликова; born 30 January 1989) is a former professional Russian tennis player. Her highest WTA singles ranking is No. 65, which she reached in May 2010. Her career-high in doubles is 226, which she attained in May 2011. Her best result on the WTA Tour is her quarterfinal appearance at the 2010 Dubai Tennis Championships where she defeated Svetlana Kuznetsova. Her biggest victory at a Grand Slam tournament came at the 2011 Australian Open, where she defeated former semifinalist Daniela Hantuchová, in the first round.

== Tennis career ==
As a junior Kulikova reached a career high of 22 in October 2004.

=== 2009 ===
After a six-month lay off, Kulikova started her 2009 on the ITF Circuit in May, falling in her opening qualifying match. She then played in the qualifying event for the French Open, but lost in the first round to Vania King. Kulikova returned to the ITF Circuit with more success, reaching the quarterfinals of the singles and winning the doubles title at a tournament in Galatina. In her subsequent tournament, Kulikova qualified for her first Grand Slam tournament at Wimbledon. She beat Karolina Šprem in the first round and then upset world No. 27, Alisa Kleybanova, in three sets. Kulikova's run came to an end against world No. 4, Elena Dementieva, in the third round, going down 6–1, 6–2 to her compatriot. Despite the scoreline, Dementieva was full of praise for her opponent, commenting: "She is a very good player. She was very impressive through the whole week". The rest of Regina's summer was marred by injury, as she was forced to retire in the final round of qualifying for the Slovenia Open. She returned to action at the US Open but lost in her first qualifying match. At the Bell Challenge, Kulikova defeated Jorgelina Cravero before falling to Lucie Šafářová, 2–6, 5–7. Kulikova finished 2009 by returning to the ITF Circuit where she won three titles— Las Vegas, Kansas City and Dubai. Her win at the Las Vegas Open was all the more impressive as Kulikova was suffering from a back strain during the final. Her last match of 2009 was a win, as she defeated Sandra Záhlavová in a narrow two-setter to take the 11th Al Habtoor Tennis Challenge in Dubai. Kulikova ended the year ranked at 138.

=== 2010 ===
In 2010, Kulikova came through to qualify for the first time at the Australian Open. In the first round she lost to Barbora Záhlavová-Strýcová, in a 4 hours and 19 minutes three-setter which was the second-longest women's singles match in the Open Era.

Ranked 99 in the world, Kulikova entered one of the biggest events of the year at the 2010 Dubai Tennis Championships and had a tremendous run by reaching the quarterfinals. She qualified for the main draw by defeating Chanelle Scheepers and Alla Kudryavtseva. She then reached the third round by defeating Maria Kirilenko and Stefanie Vögele in two sets, respectively. In the third round, she came from a set down and a 1–4 third set deficit to defeat world No. 4, Svetlana Kuznetsova. She then lost in three sets to world No. 9, Agnieszka Radwańska, in the quarterfinals with a score of 3–6, 6–4, 6–3. Due to her success, she jumped 31 places in the WTA rankings to a career high of No. 68.

Hoping to continue her recent good form, Kulikova entered the 2010 Sony Ericsson Open in Miami. In the qualifying rounds, she lost just three games, defeating Sharon Fichman 6–0, 6–1 and Kathrin Wörle 6–1, 6–1 to enter the main draw. She was then defeated by world No. 55, Roberta Vinci, 3–6, 6–3, 6–4 in the first round. In the first set, Kulikova came back from 0–3 to win it 6–3 and attempted to launch a comeback from 1–5 in the third set, and managed to get to 4–5 30–0 but could not push for the win.

She then entered the main draw of the 2010 Barcelona Ladies Open and defeated eighth seed Lucie Šafářová in the first round before she was defeated by unseeded Timea Bacsinszky in the second. Despite an early loss, she rose to a new career-high of No. 66.

After a short break, Kulikova resumed her clay-court season with a direct entry into the 2010 Internationaux de Strasbourg. She was defeated by top seed Maria Sharapova in the first round, in three sets.

Due to her ranking, Kulikova then competed in the main draw of the French Open without having to qualify. She drew 17th seed Francesca Schiavone in the first round and despite much determination, she was unable to beat the Italian, losing, the only player to take a set off the eventual champion in the tournament.

== Personal life ==
Born in Almaty in Kazakhstan, Kulikova was six years old when she first played tennis; her mother took her to the tennis courts near their house to try the sport out. At 19, Regina married Simone Serges, she first met him at the tennis club in Italy where she used to train. On her marriage Kulikova has been quoted as saying: "He's not a tennis player but he was trying to play! He's a nice person, I'm very happy with my marriage".

== ITF Circuit finals ==
Legend
$100,000 tournaments
$75,000 tournaments
$50,000 tournaments
$25,000 tournaments
$10,000 tournaments

=== Singles: 18 (13 titles, 5 runner-ups) ===
Result	No.	Date	Tournament	Surface	Opponent	Score
Win	1.	Aug 2005	ITF Trecastagni, Italy	Hard	(Italy) Giulia Meruzzi	6–1, 4–6, 6–4
Loss	2.	Oct 2005	ITF Settimo San Pietro, Italy	Clay	(Italy) Anna Floris	4–6, 1–4 ret.
Win	3.	Jul 2006	ITF Imola, Italy	Carpet	(France) Anaïs Laurendon	6–4, 6–2
Win	4.	Aug 2006	ITF Jesi, Italy	Hard	(Italy) Giulia Gatto-Monticone	6–3, 6–4
Loss	5.	Aug 2006	ITF Trecastagni, Italy	Hard	(Italy) Anna Floris	7–6, 0–6, 2–6
Win	6.	May 2007	ITF Incheon, Korea	Hard	(South Korea) Lee Ye-ra	6–3, 2–6, 6–3
Win	7.	May 2007	ITF Changwon, Korea	Hard	(Chinese Taipei) Chan Chin-wei	6–3, 4–6, 6–2
Loss	8.	Jun 2007	ITF Changsha, China	Hard	(China) Zhang Shuai	3–6, 4–6
Loss	9.	Jun 2007	ITF Guangzhou, China	Hard	(China) Zhang Shuai	3–6, 1–6
Win	10.	Jun 2007	ITF Noto, Japan	Carpet	(China) Zhang Shuai	7–5, 6–1
Loss	11.	Jul 2007	ITF Nagoya, Japan	Hard	(China) Zhang Shuai	3–6, 1–6
Win	12.	Feb 2008	ITF Clearwater, United States	Hard	(Ukraine) Yevgenia Savranska	6–4, 6–4
Win	13.	Sep 2008	ITF Granada, Spain	Hard	(Spain) Estrella Cabeza-Candela	6–3, 6–4
Win	14.	Sep 2009	Las Vegas Open, United States	Hard	(Hungary) Anikó Kapros	6–2, 6–2
Win	15.	Oct 2009	ITF Kansas City, United States	Hard	(Canada) Valérie Tétreault	6–4, 6–1
Win	16.	Dec 2009	Dubai Tennis Challenge, United Arab Emirates	Hard	(Czech Republic) Sandra Záhlavová	7–6^{(7–3)}, 6–3
Win	17.	Sep 2011	ITF Albuquerque, United States	Hard	(Georgia (country)) Anna Tatishvili	7–5, 6–3
Win	18.	Dec 2012	ITF St. Petersburg, Russia	Carpet (i)	(Ukraine) Anastasiya Vasylyeva	6–0, 5–7, 6–4

=== Doubles: 5 (2 titles, 3 runner-ups) ===
Result	No.	Date	Tournament	Surface	Partner	Opponents	Score
Loss	1.	Aug 2005	ITF Trecastagni, Italy	Hard	(Russia) Marina Shamayko	(New Zealand) Leanne Baker (Italy) Francesca Lubiani	2–6, 6–4, 3–6
Win	2.	Sep 2008	ITF Ciampino, Italy	Clay	(Italy) Claudia Giovine	(Italy) Stefania Chieppa (Italy) Lisa Sabino	6–4, 4–6, [10–7]
Loss	3.	Sep 2008	ITF Granada, Spain	Hard	(France) Irena Pavlović	(Spain) Leticia Costas (Spain) Maite Gabarrús-Alonso	w/o
Win	4.	Jun 2009	ITF Galatina, Italy	Clay	(Russia) Elena Bovina	(Spain) Beatriz Garcia-Vidagany (Argentina) María Emilia Salerni	6–2, 6–1
Loss	5.	Jun 2011	Nottingham Challenge, UK	Grass	(Russia) Evgeniya Rodina	(Czech Republic) Eva Birnerová (Czech Republic) Petra Cetkovská	3–6, 2–6
