= Ivan Ljubičić =

Croatian tennis coach & player (born 1979)

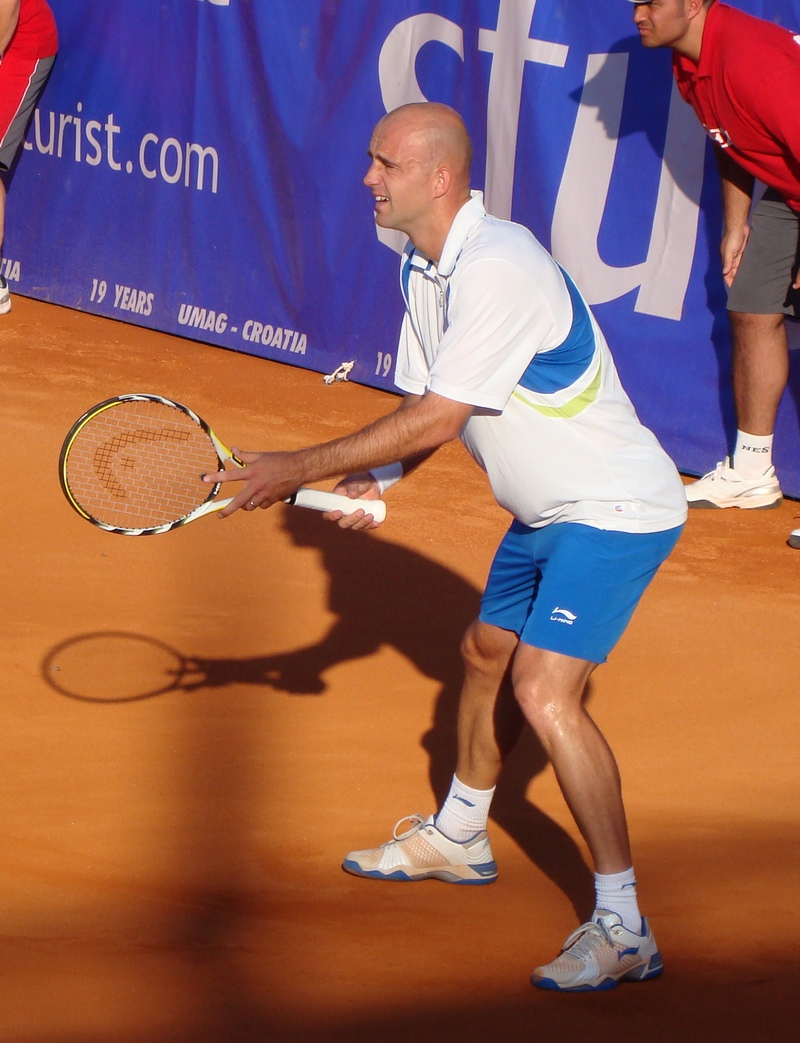
- Ljubičić at the 2008 Croatia Open
- Country (sports): Croatia
- Residence: Monte Carlo, Monaco
- Born: 19 March 1979 (age 47) Banja Luka, SR Bosnia and Herzegovina, SFR Yugoslavia
- Height: 1.93 m (6 ft 4 in)
- Turned pro: 1998
- Retired: 15 April 2012
- Plays: Right-handed (one-handed backhand)
- Prize money: US$10,181,121

Singles
- Career record: 429–296 (59.2% in ATP Tour and Grand Slam main draw matches, and in Davis Cup)
- Career titles: 10
- Highest ranking: No. 3 (1 May 2006)

Grand Slam singles results
- Australian Open: QF (2006)
- French Open: SF (2006)
- Wimbledon: 3R (2006, 2007, 2011)
- US Open: 3R (2005, 2007)

Other tournaments
- Tour Finals: RR (2005, 2006)
- Olympic Games: 3R (2000, 2004)

Doubles
- Career record: 111–128 (ATP Tour and Grand Slam-level, and in Davis Cup)
- Career titles: 0
- Highest ranking: No. 70 (16 May 2005)

Grand Slam doubles results
- Australian Open: QF (2010)
- French Open: 3R (2004, 2006)
- Wimbledon: 1R (2005, 2006, 2007)
- US Open: QF (2003, 2009)

Other doubles tournaments
- Olympic Games: Bronze Medal (2004)

Team competitions
- Davis Cup: W (2005)

Coaching career
- Milos Raonic (2013–2015); Roger Federer (2016–2022); Félix Auger-Aliassime (2026–present)

Coaching achievements
- Coachee singles titles total: 17
- List of notable tournaments (with champion) 2x Australian Open (Federer); Wimbledon (Federer); 4x ATP World Tour Masters 1000 (Federer)
Medal record
Representing Croatia
Olympic Games – Tennis
| Bronze medal – third place | 2004 Athens | Doubles |

Ivan Ljubičić (Croatian pronunciation: [ǐʋan ʎûbitʃitɕ]; born 19 March 1979) is a Croatian former professional tennis player, coach and Tennis TV commentator. He reached a career-high Association of Tennis Professionals (ATP) world No. 3 singles ranking on 1 May 2006. His career highlights include reaching a major semifinal at the 2006 French Open, and a Masters title at the Indian Wells Masters in 2010. He also contested three other Masters finals, two in 2005 at Madrid and Paris, and the other at the 2006 Miami Open.

Since retiring, Ljubičić has coached ATP top-3-ranked players Milos Raonic and Roger Federer. He was credited with Federer's improved backhand later in his career, especially evident on high shots, as well as introducing tactical changes of taking shots much earlier: taking more time, pace, and rhythm off opponents and simultaneously making Federer's game more offensive.

== Tennis career ==
Ljubičić turned pro in 1998. During his career, he achieved his best results in indoor tournaments played on carpet or hardcourt. He reached consecutive indoor Masters finals in 2005 at Madrid and Paris, losing both of them in 5 sets. Ljubičić and Mario Ančić were the first doubles team to defeat Bob and Mike Bryan in Davis Cup history, and only one of four to have done that, the other teams being France's Arnaud Clément and Michaël Llodra, Brazil's Marcelo Melo and Bruno Soares and Serbia's Nenad Zimonjić and Ilija Bozoljac. Ljubičić helped Croatia win the 2005 Davis Cup, their first ever title, where they triumphed over the Slovak Davis Cup team in the final. He qualified for the year-end Tennis Masters Cup in 2005 and 2006.

Ljubičić served as the ATP Players' Council president and in 2008 became one of the few active players to serve on the ATP Board of Directors. He won his first Masters title in 2010, and retired in 2012 at the Monte-Carlo Masters.

After retirement, Ljubičić has worked as a coach and manager for several top 5 players.

=== Early years and juniors ===
Ljubičić was born in Banja Luka, at the time SR Bosnia and Herzegovina, SFR Yugoslavia to a Bosnian Croat father, Marko, and a Bosniak mother, Hazira (née Beganović). He started playing tennis as a child in 1988, and he soon won his first local awards as a junior. In May 1992, because of the war in Bosnia and Herzegovina, the family left Banja Luka, and Ivan, his mother and his brother moved to Opatija, Croatia, while his father was unable to leave. In November 1992, they were reunited and moved to Rijeka. Soon after, in April 1993, Ljubičić went to a tennis club in Moncalieri near Turin, Italy. During the next three years, Ljubičić grew into a promising prospect.

==== 1995 ====
He decided to play for Croatia and in 1995 won his first junior championship, becoming the Croatian under-16 champion. The same year, he won his first ATP points and played for the Croatian team in the Winter Cup (European under-16 indoors championship). Pairing up with Željko Krajan, he won the Orange Bowl (the unofficial world under-16 championship).

==== 1996 ====
In 1996, the family moved to Zagreb, while Ivan continued his successes. He joined the tennis club Mladost and played in more and more junior ITF tournaments. His biggest success as a junior was reaching the final at Wimbledon, where he was defeated by Vladimir Voltchkov of Belarus after winning the first set.

==== 1997 ====
He reached the Australian Open junior semifinal in 1997 and won the Eddie Herr tournament, which made him the No. 2 junior in the world. In early 1997, he started training with the Italian professional coach Riccardo Piatti. His successes continued: quarterfinals of the junior French Open, and first steps of entering professional tennis.

=== 1998 ===
He turned professional in 1998 and played in the final of the ATP Challenger in Zagreb, where he lost to former French Open finalist Alberto Berasategui. He played a number of smaller tournaments the same year, but had little success and finished the year ranked No. 293.

=== 1999 ===
In 1999, he won two Futures tournaments, as well as a Challenger in Besançon, France. He won two more victories in the qualifications for the Casablanca Tour event, where he was defeated by Juan Carlos Ferrero. He then entered the Super 9 tournament in Monte Carlo (today's Monte Carlo Masters), where he reached the third round after an amazing run in which he defeated Andrei Medvedev and Yevgeny Kafelnikov. He also played in the Croatia Open in Umag, where he was eliminated in the semifinal by Magnus Norman. He finished the year ranked world No. 77.

=== 2000 ===
In 2000, Ljubičić played in two semifinals (Sydney and Båstad) and three quarterfinals (Marseille, Copenhagen, and Brighton). He also played in the third round of the Olympic tournament.

=== 2001 ===
He won his first ATP singles title at Lyon in 2001, after defeating Gustavo Kuerten, Gastón Gaudio, Marat Safin, and Younes El Aynaoui. At that point he reached No. 29 in the professional rankings and continued to play well, participating in seven ATP Tour semifinals: Adelaide, Rotterdam, Miami, St. Polten, Gstaad, Umag, and Cincinnati. He finished the year ranked No. 37.

=== 2002 ===
In 2002, he was in two semifinals (Rotterdam and Gstaad) and four quarterfinals (Adelaide, Dubai, Umag, and Tashkent) on the ATP Tour, and it was the first time he passed the first round at a Grand Slam, when he reached the third round of the Australian Open, where he was stopped by Wayne Ferreira in five sets. He ended the year ranked No. 49, and also No. 2 in the number of aces, behind Wayne Arthurs.

=== 2003 ===
In 2003, he reached the semifinals of Milan, Dubai, Bangkok, and Basel. He also reached the third round of the Monte Carlo Masters and the quarterfinals of the Rome Masters. He lost in the second round in the U.S. Open to Andy Roddick, who would then go on to become the champion that year. The score was 3–6, 7–6, 3–6, 6–7.

=== 2004 ===
In 2004, he started the year as the runner-up to Nicolas Escudé in Doha, and also played in the semifinals in the Hamburg Masters, Indianapolis, and the Madrid Masters. He also reached the quarterfinals at Basel and the Miami Masters. At the Olympics, he teamed up with Mario Ančić to win the bronze medal in doubles. They were defeated by the Chilean duo of Fernando González and Nicolás Massú, the eventual gold medalists, in the semifinals. In the bronze medal match, they defeated the Indian team of Mahesh Bhupathi and Leander Paes. During the year, Ivan married his wife Aida, who is always with him at ATP tournaments. They have two children.

=== 2005 ===
In 2005, Ljubičić won two ATP titles and was the runner-up at another six, losing to world No. 1 Roger Federer in three of them, and world No. 2 Rafael Nadal in another one.

After the retirement of Goran Ivanišević, Ljubičić was the top player on the Croatian Davis Cup team. In the first round of Davis Cup, the Croatian team defeated the United States in the first round played in March. Ljubičić defeated Andre Agassi in straight sets in his first singles match. He then teamed with Mario Ančić to defeat the Bryan Brothers, then the world's second-ranked doubles team. He finally clinched victory for his country, defeating America's No. 1 player and former world No. 1 Andy Roddick in five sets.

In July at the Davis Cup Quarterfinals, Ljubičić again won his singles matches against Romania's Victor Hănescu and Andrei Pavel, and then together with Ančić in the doubles match defeated the Pavel-Gabriel Trifu duo in five sets. In the semifinal held in September against the Russian team, Ljubičić defeated Mikhail Youzhny in five sets in his first singles match. He teamed with Ančić to defeat Igor Andreev and Dmitry Tursunov in another five-set match. Finally, he defeated Nikolay Davydenko to secure victory for Croatia.

He reached consecutive finals of the last two Masters Series Events, losing to Nadal in Madrid after being up two sets to love and to Tomáš Berdych at Paris. He finished the year ranked No. 9 in the world and earned his first appearance at the year-end Masters Cup, where he was eliminated in the group stage (Ljubičić was one of a number of entrants who were invited due to the withdrawal of higher-ranked players, such as No. 2 Rafael Nadal).

In the Davis Cup final, Ljubičić defeated Karol Kučera in the opening singles match. He then paired with Mario Ančić to win the doubles match. Although Ljubičić lost his second singles match to Dominik Hrbatý, Ancic's victory over Michal Mertiňák in the final match gave Croatia its first Davis Cup victory.

=== 2006 ===
Prior to the Australian Open, Ljubičić played a tournament in Chennai. Seeded first, he was expected to do well on the hard courts there. He reached the final and defeated Spaniard Carlos Moyà. At the Australian Open, he reached the quarterfinals of a Grand Slam tournament for the first time in his career. He defeated Thomas Johansson of Sweden in straight sets in the fourth round. He lost to eventual finalist Marcos Baghdatis of Cyprus in the quarterfinals in five sets. After the Australian Open, he played at the Zagreb Indoor Open, which is played on carpet, a surface typically favoured by Ljubičić. He reached the final once more and defeated Stefan Koubek.

He bettered this feat when he made the semifinals of the French Open, beating Carlos Berlocq, Óscar Hernández, Juan Mónaco, Rubén Ramírez Hidalgo and Julien Benneteau before the run ended with a loss to Rafael Nadal, who holds the record for the longest win streak on clay. It was speculated that Ljubičić was able to make it this far because his highest-ranked opponent was not even ranked in the top 70. After the match, Ljubičić made controversial comments about how Nadal took too much time between points. He stated he hoped Roger Federer would defeat him in the final. However, Nadal went on to beat Federer in the final. Ljubičić then traveled to Queen's Club, defeating Răzvan Sabău before losing to Gaël Monfils in the round of 16.

At the Wimbledon Championships, Ljubičić faced 2005 quarterfinalist Feliciano López. He won 11–9 in the fifth. He then defeated Justin Gimelstob, before losing in the third round to Dmitry Tursunov, after being up two sets to none. He then traveled to Gstaad, Switzerland to play in the Allianz Suisse Open on red clay. Being the top seed, he defeated Spaniard Albert Portas in the first round and Marco Chiudinelli in the second round, before losing to seed Feliciano López in straight sets. In the Canada Masters, he reached the third round, before losing out to Fernando González. He then went to the Bangkok Open, where he was the top seed and reached the final round. He met America's James Blake, but was defeated and moved to no. 3 on the ATP ace list. He did not remain no. 3, due to David Nalbandian, who pushed him down by advancing to the semifinals in Madrid. At the US Open, Ljubičić was drawn against Feliciano López of Spain in the first round, as he had been at Wimbledon. Lopez defeated Ljubičić in straight sets.

=== 2007 ===
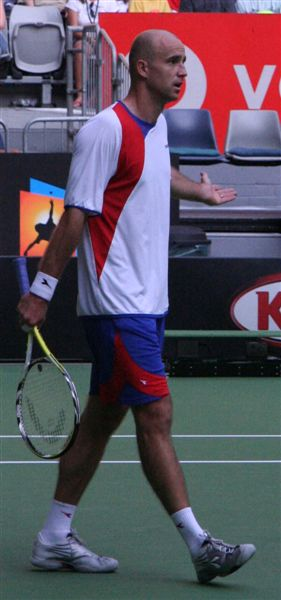
Ljubičić in his only 2007 Australian Open match, questioning a line call.

Ljubičić began his 2007 season with a victory at the $1 million Qatar ExxonMobil Open. En route to his victory, he defeated Andy Murray in the finals. In doing so, he became the race leader in the 2007 Indesit ATP Race. In this tournament, Ljubičić played his first competitive match with a Head racquet, after abandoning his previous racket sponsor, Babolat.

He played in the Australian Open and was seeded fourth, but was surprisingly defeated in the first round by Mardy Fish. Ljubičić bounced back well to make the final of the Zagreb Indoor Open, against Cypriot Marcos Baghdatis. Despite not losing serve the entire match until facing matchpoint, Ljubičić lost in the final. At the Open 13 tournament in Marseille, Ljubičić, the second seed, was one of four seeds to lose in the first round, losing to qualifier but local favorite Nicolas Mahut. In Rotterdam, he made it to the final, where he was beaten by Mikhail Youzhny. At the Pacific Life Open in Indian Wells, California, Ljubičić lost to Andy Roddick in the quarterfinals.

Prior to Wimbledon, Ljubičić had some success on the grass courts, a surface in which he had previously failed to reach the last eight. Playing at s'Hertogenbosch in the Netherlands, he defeated Dutch home crowd favourite, Peter Wessels in three tight sets. Ljubičić won the final set 7–6, securing his victory, despite not breaking the Dutchman's serve in the match. As the 15th seed (ranked no. 12), he opened his Wimbledon campaign against American Vince Spadea, followed by a win over Jan Hernych, but fell in four sets to Paul-Henri Mathieu. He and Ernests Gulbis lost in the men's doubles competition in the first round. In September, just one day before start of Davis Cup tie against Great Britain, he discovered blood in his urine. After tests, it was announced that he had two small stones in the kidney. He was then advised to take a break for the next couple of weeks.

Ljubičić then reached the semifinals of the China Open, losing to Fernando González, the quarterfinals in Vienna, and the quarterfinals in Lyon. However, he failed to win a match in the two Masters Series tournaments, losing to Stefan Koubek in Madrid and Marcos Baghdatis in Paris.

=== 2008 ===
Ljubičić's first tournament of 2008 was in Doha, where he reached the semifinals, losing to Stanislas Wawrinka. However, he suffered a first-round defeat at the Australian Open, losing to Dutchman Robin Haase in four sets. He was then granted a wildcard to a Challenger in East London, South Africa, where he defeated Stefan Koubek in straight sets. It was Ljubičić's first Challenger in over two years.

His next significant result was in Zagreb, where, as the home crowd favorite, he reached the final, losing to Ukrainian lucky loser Sergiy Stakhovsky. At the French Open, Ljubičić came back from a two-set deficit to defeat world No. 4, and 2007 French Open semifinalist Nikolay Davydenko. He had previously lost to Davydenko on clay at Hamburg in 2008. At Wimbledon, Ljubičić lost to Austrian Jürgen Melzer in five sets.

=== 2009 ===
Ljubičić started the season as world No. 58. His first tournament was the Australian Open, where he beat Igor Kunitsyn in the first round in five sets, before losing in the second round to Jo-Wilfried Tsonga in four sets. He then participated at Zagreb, where he defeated Christophe Rochus in the first round, before losing to Viktor Troicki in the second. He then lost in the opening match in three tournaments: in Rotterdam to Andy Murray in Marseille to Feliciano López and in the Dubai to David Ferrer. His ranking fell to No. 74.

His next tournament was the BNP Paribas Open. He defeated Kei Nishikori in the first round, and fellow Croatian Mario Ančić in the second when Ančić retired with illness at 3–3. He then upset eighth seeded Gilles Simon in the third and outlasted Igor Andreev in the fourth to reach the quarterfinals, where he was at last beaten by fourth seeded Andy Murray. Ljubičić received a wild card into the Monte Carlo Masters and in the second round defeated Juan Martín del Potro. He proceeded to the quarterfinals, where he was defeated by four-time defending champion Rafael Nadal. Due to his strong play at Monte Carlo, he received a wild card into the Madrid Masters. He again defeated a top-10 player in the second round, beating ninth seed Jo-Wilfried Tsonga. He then defeated eighth seed Gilles Simon to reach his third quarterfinal at a Masters 1000 event. He was defeated by Novak Djokovic in the quarterfinals. His performances during the clay-court season have helped his ranking improve to No. 43, his highest since August 2008. His clay-court form did not carry into the French Open, as he suffered a disappointing defeat by Juan Carlos Ferrero in five sets in the first round. Ljubičić didn't compete at Wimbledon due to an injury.

Ljubičić returned to form in China. At the China Open, he reached the quarterfinals, losing to Robin Söderling. At the inaugural Shanghai Masters event, Ljubičić reached the quarterfinals for the fourth time at a Masters 1000 event. He defeated Julien Benneteau in the first round, world No. 9 Fernando Verdasco in straight sets in the second round and was cruising over Gaël Monfils 6–2, 3–0, before the Frenchman retired. Ljubičić then retired from his quarterfinal match against Rafael Nadal, after splitting the first two sets. He was the eighth player to retire during the event. He won his first title since June 2007, at the Grand Prix de Tennis de Lyon event. Seeded third, he did not defeat a single seeded player, benefiting from several seeded players losing early. After defeating Martín Vassallo Argüello and Nicolas Kiefer, Ljubičić defeated three Frenchmen in a row to take the title. He defeated Florent Serra, and wild cards Arnaud Clément in the semifinal and Michaël Llodra in the final.

=== 2010 ===
Ljubičić began the season with a third-round finish at the Australian Open, losing to Ivo Karlović. He also made the quarterfinals in the Dubai Tennis Championships, where he lost to eventual champion and world No. 2 Novak Djokovic, in three sets.

At the BNP Paribas Open in Indian Wells, he beat Djokovic in the fourth round. He proceeded to upset defending champion Rafael Nadal in the semifinals, avenging his loss against him in the 2005 Madrid Masters final and sending Ivan to his fourth career Masters 1000 final. He successfully broke his trend of three previous final losses in these master series tournaments by defeating American favorite Andy Roddick in the final to lift his first ever Masters Series trophy. He became the first Croat to ever win the tournament, the second-oldest winner at the tournament (behind Jimmy Connors who was five months older when he won in 1984), and the oldest first-time winner of a Master Series 1000 event. As a result of his performance in the tournament, in which he defeated three top-10 players—Djokovic (No. 2) in the quarterfinals, Nadal (No. 3) in the semifinals, and Roddick (No. 8) in the final, en route to the title—he broke into the top 20 in the rankings for the first time in nearly two years, No. 13 as of 22 March.

=== 2011 ===
Ljubičić reached the latter rounds of the Monte Carlo clay-court tournament and the third round at Wimbledon, where he lost to Andy Murray. He lost to David Nalbandian in the second round at the US Open. He reached the finals in Metz in September, where he lost to Jo-Wilfried Tsonga. He reached the semifinals of the China Open, but lost to Marin Čilić.

=== 2012 ===
Ljubičić played the last tournament of his professional career at Monte-Carlo Rolex Masters in April. He ended his career by losing in the first round to Ivan Dodig 6–0, 6–3.

=== After retirement ===
==== 2013 ====
In March, Ljubičić became Tomáš Berdych's manager.

In June, Ljubičić became Canadian player Milos Raonic's coach. Two months later, Raonic reached his first Masters final in Toronto, losing to Rafael Nadal.

==== 2014 ====
In his first full season under Ljubičić, Raonic broke into the top 10 in 2014 and also reached his first French Open quarterfinals, losing to Novak Djokovic, as well as his first Wimbledon semifinals, losing to Roger Federer. In November, Raonic reached his second Masters final in Paris, losing to Djokovic again. He also qualified for his first ATP World Tour Finals appearance, but was eliminated in round robin.

==== 2015 ====
In his second full season under Ljubičić, Raonic reached his first Australian Open quarterfinals, losing to Djokovic. In December, Ljubičić ended his partnership with Raonic and started to work with his old rival and former world No. 1 Roger Federer.

==== 2016 ====
Ljubičić coached Federer together with Swiss Davis Cup Captain Severin Luthi. In February, a week after reaching the semifinals of the Australian Open losing to Djokovic, Federer underwent knee surgery. It is only his second tournament with Ljubičić. An attempted comeback in May was halted by further back problems. Federer managed to reach the semifinals of Wimbledon losing to Ljubičić's former student Raonic before re-injuring his knee and subsequently taking six months off to recover.

==== 2017 ====
In January, under Ljubičić's guidance, Federer defeated Rafael Nadal in the final of the Australian Open, giving Ljubičić his first Grand Slam as a coach. It was Federer's first win against Nadal at the Australian Open, and the first time Federer beat Nadal in a Grand Slam since 2007. It was Federer's 18th Grand Slam, extending his all-time record. Two additional Masters titles followed in March at Indian Wells, where Federer defeated countryman Stan Wawrinka in the final, and at Miami, where Federer defeated Nadal in the final.

After skipping the clay season, Federer claimed his 19th Grand Slam at Wimbledon without dropping a set, defeating Marin Čilić in the final. In October, Federer beat Nadal in the Shanghai Masters final. It was his fourth win of the year against Nadal and his fifth in succession over the Spaniard.

==== 2018 ====
In January, under Ljubičić's guidance, Federer was able to defend Australian Open by defeating Marin Čilić in the final. In mid-February, Federer won his third Rotterdam Open title to return to No. 1 in the ATP rankings, officially clinching the spot with a quarterfinal victory over Robin Haase.

== Playing style ==
Ljubičić is known for his offensive and intelligent game, characterized by his deadly serve and powerful groundstrokes off both wings, as well as his excellent selection of shots. His serve is known for its precision, incredible consistency, and tremendous speed, as it was often clocked above 130 mph and can reach up to high 140s (mph). His serve is often compared with contemporary Andy Roddick, being two of the best servers of the generation, although Roddick's serve relies on more power than precision. He usually stays at the baseline, relying on his fast, consistent and wide-driving groundstrokes, and uses slice and dropshots to great effect to surprise his opponents. He is very adept at the net, approaching when he sees fit, which also made him a good doubles player. His main weaknesses are his occasional inability to close out 5-set matches, and to a lesser extent, his movement around the court.

== Career statistics ==
=== Performance timelines ===
Key
| W | F | SF | QF | #R | RR | Q# | DNQ | A | NH |

(W) winner; (F) finalist; (SF) semifinalist; (QF) quarterfinalist; (#R) rounds 4, 3, 2, 1; (RR) round-robin stage; (Q#) qualification round; (DNQ) did not qualify; (A) absent; (NH) not held; (SR) strike rate (events won / competed); (W–L) win–loss record.

==== Grand Slam tournaments ====
| | | | Professional Career | | | | | | | | | | | | | | | | |
| Tournament | 1996 | 1997 | 1998 | 1999 | 2000 | 2001 | 2002 | 2003 | 2004 | 2005 | 2006 | 2007 | 2008 | 2009 | 2010 | 2011 | 2012 | SR | W–L |
|---|---|---|---|---|---|---|---|---|---|---|---|---|---|---|---|---|---|---|---|
| Australian Open | A | Q2 | Q1 | A | 1R | 1R | 3R | 1R | 2R | 2R | QF | 1R | 1R | 2R | 3R | 3R | 1R | 0 / 13 | 13–13 |
| French Open | A | A | A | Q2 | 1R | 1R | 1R | 3R | 2R | 1R | SF | 3R | 4R | 1R | 3R | 4R | A | 0 / 12 | 18–12 |
| Wimbledon | A | A | A | A | 1R | 1R | 2R | 2R | 1R | 1R | 3R | 3R | 1R | A | 1R | 3R | A | 0 / 11 | 8–11 |
| US Open | A | Q2 | A | 2R | 1R | 2R | 2R | 2R | 1R | 3R | 1R | 3R | A | 1R | 1R | 2R | A | 0 / 12 | 9–12 |
| Win–loss | 0–0 | 0–0 | 0–0 | 1–1 | 0–4 | 1–4 | 4–4 | 4–4 | 2–4 | 3–4 | 11–4 | 6–4 | 3–3 | 1–3 | 4–4 | 8–4 | 0–1 | 0 / 48 | 48–48 |

==== Year-end championship ====
| | | | Professional Career | | | | | | | | | | | | | | | | |
| Tournament | 1996 | 1997 | 1998 | 1999 | 2000 | 2001 | 2002 | 2003 | 2004 | 2005 | 2006 | 2007 | 2008 | 2009 | 2010 | 2011 | 2012 | SR | W–L |
|---|---|---|---|---|---|---|---|---|---|---|---|---|---|---|---|---|---|---|---|
| Tennis Masters Cup | Did not qualify | | | | | | | | | RR | RR | Did not qualify | | | | | | 0 / 2 | 2–4 |
