= 2022 Elena Rybakina tennis season =

Tennis season statistics

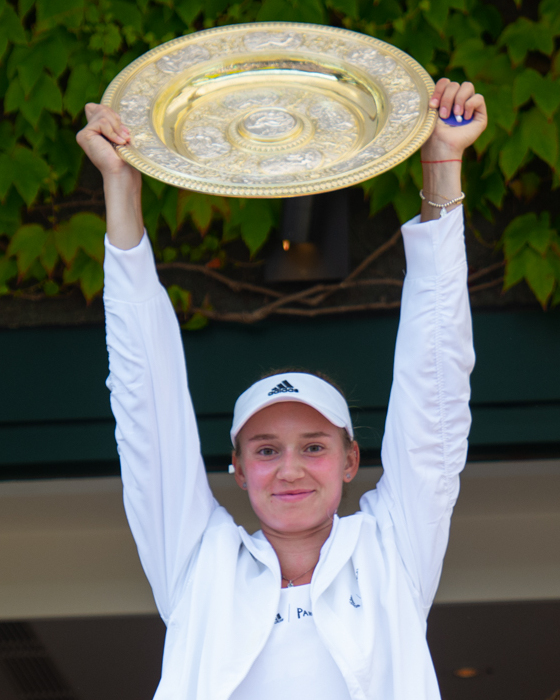
- Rybakina with the Venus Rosewater Dish at the 2022 Wimbledon Championships
- Full name: Elena Rybakina
- Country: Kazakhstan
- Calendar prize money: $3,613,440

Singles
- Season record: 40–21
- Calendar titles: 1
- Year-end ranking: No. 22
- Ranking change from previous year: ▼8

Grand Slam & significant results
- Australian Open: 2R
- French Open: 3R
- Wimbledon: W
- US Open: 1R

Doubles
- Season record: 1–7
- Current ranking: No. 119
- Ranking change from previous year: ▼393

Grand Slam doubles results
- Australian Open: A
- French Open: 1R
- Wimbledon: A
- US Open: A
- Last updated on: 7 March 2024.

The 2022 Elena Rybakina tennis season officially began on 3 January 2022, with the start of the Adelaide International 1 in Adelaide.

During this season, Rybakina:

- Won the Wimbledon, first major title of her career.
- She became the first Kazakhstani and the first Asian singles player to win the Wimbledon.
- At 23 years old, she became the youngest Wimbledon champion since Petra Kvitova in 2011.
- She achieved her highest ranking of World No.12. She became the highest ranked Kazakhstani singles player ever.

== Yearly Summary ==
Rybakina started the season at the Adelaide International 1, making it to the final where she was defeated by world No. 1, Ash Barty. Her success continued at the Sydney Tennis Classic with a lopsided defeat of reigning US Open champion Emma Raducanu, in the first round. She subsequently withdrew from the tournament citing a thigh injury. She reached a career-high ranking of No. 12, on 17 January 2022.

Her remaining early hardcourt season saw little progress with a second-round retirement and a walkover at the Australian Open and St. Petersburg Ladies' Trophy, respectively, and a first-round loss at the Qatar Ladies Open. Her "Sunshine Double" (Miami and Indian Wells) saw improvement with a quarterfinal appearance at the Indian Wells Open against Maria Sakkari and a third-round appearance to Jessica Pegula at the Miami Open.

Her clay-court season began with a second-round loss to Anhelina Kalinina after a first-round bye at Charleston. Following this, she represented Kazakhstan as the team's top seed and won both of her singles matches in a tie against Germany securing a berth in the finals later in the year. The remainder of her clay-court season saw little achievement as she failed to advance into the quarterfinals at the Stuttgart Open, Madrid Open, Italian Open, and French Open.

Rybakina's grass-court season in the lead up to Wimbledon saw a second-round loss to Shelby Rogers at the Rosmalen Open followed by a first-round bye and a second-round loss to Lesia Tsurenko at the Eastbourne International. At the Wimbledon Championships, she reached her second Grand Slam quarterfinal, defeating CoCo Vandeweghe, Bianca Andreescu, Zheng Qinwen and Petra Martić. Then she reached the semifinals at a Major for the first time, defeating Ajla Tomljanović in her quarterfinal match. She became the first Kazakhstani singles player (male or female) to reach the semifinal of a Grand Slam. Then she reached her first Major final, after defeating Simona Halep in straight sets, becoming the youngest Wimbledon finalist since Garbiñe Muguruza in 2015. After dropping the first set, she defeated Ons Jabeur in three sets to secure her first major title. She became the youngest woman champion since the 21-year-old Petra Kvitová in 2011. She was the fourth-youngest active Grand Slam champion, older only than Iga Świątek, Bianca Andreescu and Emma Raducanu. Rybakina's Russian nationality and previous international representation of Russia became a matter of public discourse in the aftermath of her success at Wimbledon 2022, where Wimbledon had banned athletes representing Russia and Belarus due to Russia's invasion of Ukraine. Russian state media celebrated Rybakina's win as a national victory despite her longstanding decision not to represent the country of her birth.

The North American hardcourt season began with early round losses at the Silicon Valley Classic (first round) and Canadian Open (second round). Her US Open preparations continued at the Cincinnati Open where she advanced to the quarterfinals and was defeated by Madison Keys. Her season continued next with an entry to the US Open as the 25th seed; however, she lost in the first round to qualifier Clara Burel.

== All matches ==
This table chronicles all the matches of Elena Rybakina in 2022.

Key
W	F	SF	QF	#R	RR	Q#	P#	DNQ	A	Z#	PO	G	S	B	NMS	NTI	P	NH

(W) winner; (F) finalist; (SF) semifinalist; (QF) quarterfinalist; (#R) rounds 4, 3, 2, 1; (RR) round-robin stage; (Q#) qualification round; (P#) preliminary round; (DNQ) did not qualify; (A) absent; (Z#) Davis/Fed Cup Zonal Group (with number indication) or (PO) play-off; (G) gold, (S) silver or (B) bronze Olympic/Paralympic medal; (NMS) not a Masters tournament; (NTI) not a Tier I tournament; (P) postponed; (NH) not held; (SR) strike rate (events won / competed); (W–L) win–loss record.
To avoid confusion and double counting, these charts are updated at the conclusion of a tournament or when the player's participation has ended.

=== Singles matches ===
Tournament	Match	Round	Opponent	Rank	Result	Score
Adelaide International; Adelaide, Australia; WTA 500; Hard, outdoor; 3 January 2022 – 9 January 2022	1	1R	(Australia) Storm Sanders (WC)	132	Win	6–4, 1–6, 6–1
Adelaide International; Adelaide, Australia; WTA 500; Hard, outdoor; 3 January 2022 – 9 January 2022	2	2R	(Czech Republic) Marie Bouzková (Q)	90	Win	6–3, 6–4
Adelaide International; Adelaide, Australia; WTA 500; Hard, outdoor; 3 January 2022 – 9 January 2022	3	QF	(United States) Shelby Rogers	40	Win	3–6, 6–3, 6–2
Adelaide International; Adelaide, Australia; WTA 500; Hard, outdoor; 3 January 2022 – 9 January 2022	4	SF	(Japan) Misaki Doi	105	Win	6–4, 6–3
Adelaide International; Adelaide, Australia; WTA 500; Hard, outdoor; 3 January 2022 – 9 January 2022	5	F	(Australia) Ashleigh Barty (1)	1	Loss	3–6, 2–6
Sydney International; Sydney, Australia; WTA 500; Hard; 10 January 2022 –15 January 2022	6	1R	(United Kingdom) Emma Raducanu	18	Win	6–0, 6–1
Sydney International; Sydney, Australia; WTA 500; Hard; 10 January 2022 –15 January 2022	–	2R	(France) Caroline Garcia	75	Withdrew	—N/a
Australian Open; Melbourne, Australia; Grand Slam; Hard, outdoor; 17 January 2022 – 30 January 2022	7	1R	(Kazakhstan) Zarina Diyas	104	Win	6–7^{(3–7)}, 7–6^{(7–3)}, 6–1
Australian Open; Melbourne, Australia; Grand Slam; Hard, outdoor; 17 January 2022 – 30 January 2022	8	2R	(China) Zhang Shuai	74	Loss	4–6, 0–1 ret.
St. Petersburg Ladies' Trophy; St. Petersburg, Russia; WTA 500; Hard; 7 February 2022 –14 February 2022	9	1R	(France) Varvara Gracheva (Q)	81	Win	6–2, 6–1
St. Petersburg Ladies' Trophy; St. Petersburg, Russia; WTA 500; Hard; 7 February 2022 –14 February 2022	–	2R	(Czech Republic) Tereza Martincová	42	Withdrew	—N/a
Qatar Open; Doha, Qatar; WTA 1000; Hard, outdoor; 21 February 2022 – 27 February 2022	10	1R	(Romania) Jaqueline Cristian (LL)	71	Loss	4–6, 3–6
Indian Wells Open; Indian Wells, United States; WTA 1000; Hard, outdoor; 7 March 2022 – 20 March 2022	–	1R	Bye			
Indian Wells Open; Indian Wells, United States; WTA 1000; Hard, outdoor; 7 March 2022 – 20 March 2022	11	2R	(Belgium) Alison Van Uytvanck	58	Win	6–1, 7–5
Indian Wells Open; Indian Wells, United States; WTA 1000; Hard, outdoor; 7 March 2022 – 20 March 2022	12	3R	Victoria Azarenka (Note: Russian and Belarus players are not allowed to compete under the name or flag of their country following the Russian invasion of Ukraine.) ^{(13)}	15	Win	6–3, 6–4
Indian Wells Open; Indian Wells, United States; WTA 1000; Hard, outdoor; 7 March 2022 – 20 March 2022	13	4R	(Switzerland) Viktorija Golubic (31)	51	Win	7–6^{(7–5)}, 6–2
Indian Wells Open; Indian Wells, United States; WTA 1000; Hard, outdoor; 7 March 2022 – 20 March 2022	14	QF	(Greece) Maria Sakkari (6)	6	Loss	5–7, 4–6
Miami Open; Miami Gardens, United States; WTA 1000; Hard, outdoor; 21 March 2022 – 3 April 2022	–	1R	Bye			
Miami Open; Miami Gardens, United States; WTA 1000; Hard, outdoor; 21 March 2022 – 3 April 2022	15	2R	(Romania) Elena-Gabriela Ruse	57	Win	6–4, 7–5
Miami Open; Miami Gardens, United States; WTA 1000; Hard, outdoor; 21 March 2022 – 3 April 2022	16	3R	(United States) Jessica Pegula (16)	21	Loss	3–6, 4–6
Charleston Open; Charleston, United States; WTA 500; Clay; 14 April 2022 –10 April 2022	–	1R	Bye			
Charleston Open; Charleston, United States; WTA 500; Clay; 14 April 2022 –10 April 2022	17	2R	(Ukraine) Anhelina Kalinina	42	Loss	4–6, 6–2, 4–6
Billie Jean King Cup qualifying round; Kazakhstan vs. Germany; Nur-Sultan, Kazakhstan; Billie Jean King Cup; Clay, indoor; 15 April 2022 – 16 April 2022	18	Q	(Germany) Laura Siegemund	232	Win	6–0, 6–1
Billie Jean King Cup qualifying round; Kazakhstan vs. Germany; Nur-Sultan, Kazakhstan; Billie Jean King Cup; Clay, indoor; 15 April 2022 – 16 April 2022	19	Q	(Germany) Angelique Kerber	17	Win	4–6, 6–3, 7–5
Stuttgart Open; Stuttgart, Germany; WTA 500; Clay, indoor; 18 April 2022 – 24 April 2022	20	1R	(Germany) Nastasja Schunk (Q)	224	Win	7–6^{(7–3)}, 7–5
Stuttgart Open; Stuttgart, Germany; WTA 500; Clay, indoor; 18 April 2022 – 24 April 2022	21	2R	(Spain) Paula Badosa (2)	3	Loss	2–6, 6–4, 6–7^{(4–7)}
Madrid Open; Madrid, Spain; WTA 1000; Clay, Outdoor; 28 April 2022 – 7 May 2022	22	1R	(France) Oceane Dodin (Q)	93	Win	6–2, 7–5
Madrid Open; Madrid, Spain; WTA 1000; Clay, Outdoor; 28 April 2022 – 7 May 2022	23	2R	(Czech Republic) Kateřina Siniaková	51	Win	6–0, 1–0 ret.
Madrid Open; Madrid, Spain; WTA 1000; Clay, Outdoor; 28 April 2022 – 7 May 2022	24	3R	(Switzerland) Jil Teichmann	35	Loss	3–6, 1–6
Italian Open; Rome, Italy; WTA 1000; Hard, outdoor; 9 May 2022 –15 May 2022	25	1R	Elina Avanesyan (Q)	146	Win	6–4, 7–6^{(7–0)}
Italian Open; Rome, Italy; WTA 1000; Hard, outdoor; 9 May 2022 –15 May 2022	26	2R	(United States) Lauren Davis (Q)	102	Win	6–4, 6–3
Italian Open; Rome, Italy; WTA 1000; Hard, outdoor; 9 May 2022 –15 May 2022	27	3R	(Switzerland) Jil Teichmann	29	Loss	7–6^{(7–3)}, 3–6, 5–7
French Open; Paris, France; Grand Slam; Clay, outdoor; 22 May 2022 – 5 June 2022	28	1R	(Netherlands) Arantxa Rus	119	Win	6–3, 5–7, 6–0
French Open; Paris, France; Grand Slam; Clay, outdoor; 22 May 2022 – 5 June 2022	29	2R	(United States) Katie Volynets (WC)	135	Win	6–4, 6–0
French Open; Paris, France; Grand Slam; Clay, outdoor; 22 May 2022 – 5 June 2022	30	3R	(United States) Madison Keys (22)	22	Loss	6–3, 1–6, 6–7^{(3–7)}
Rosmalen Open; 's-Hertogenbosch, Netherlands; WTA 250; Grass; 6–12 June 2022	31	1R	(United States) Jamie Loeb (Q)	227	Win	6–4, 7–5
Rosmalen Open; 's-Hertogenbosch, Netherlands; WTA 250; Grass; 6–12 June 2022	32	2R	(United States) Shelby Rogers	42	Loss	2–6, 4–6
Eastbourne International; Eastbourne, United Kingdom; WTA 500; Grass; 19–25 June 2022	33	1R	(Ukraine) Lesia Tsurenko (Q)	114	Loss	6–1 5–7 3–6
Wimbledon Championships; London, United Kingdom; Grand Slam; Grass, outdoor; 27 June 2022 – 10 July 2022
Wimbledon Championships; London, United Kingdom; Grand Slam; Grass, outdoor; 27 June 2022 – 10 July 2022	34	1R	(United States) CoCo Vandeweghe (LL)	157	Win	7–6^{(7–2)}, 7–5
Wimbledon Championships; London, United Kingdom; Grand Slam; Grass, outdoor; 27 June 2022 – 10 July 2022	35	2R	(Canada) Bianca Andreescu	56	Win	6–4, 7–6^{(7–5)}
Wimbledon Championships; London, United Kingdom; Grand Slam; Grass, outdoor; 27 June 2022 – 10 July 2022	36	3R	(China) Zheng Qinwen	52	Win	7–6^{(7–4)}, 7–5
Wimbledon Championships; London, United Kingdom; Grand Slam; Grass, outdoor; 27 June 2022 – 10 July 2022	37	4R	(Croatia) Petra Martić	80	Win	7–5, 6–3
Wimbledon Championships; London, United Kingdom; Grand Slam; Grass, outdoor; 27 June 2022 – 10 July 2022	38	QF	(Australia) Ajla Tomljanović	44	Win	4–6, 6–2, 6–3
Wimbledon Championships; London, United Kingdom; Grand Slam; Grass, outdoor; 27 June 2022 – 10 July 2022	39	SF	(Romania) Simona Halep (16)	18	Win	6–3, 6–3
Wimbledon Championships; London, United Kingdom; Grand Slam; Grass, outdoor; 27 June 2022 – 10 July 2022	40	W	(Tunisia) Ons Jabeur (3)	2	Win (1)	3–6, 6–2, 6–2
Silicon Valley Classic; San Jose, United States; WTA 500; Hard; 1 August 2022 –7 August 2022	41	1R	Daria Kasatkina (7)	12	Loss	6–1, 2–6, 6–0
Canadian Open; Toronto, Canada; WTA 1000; Hard, outdoor; 8 August 2022 – 14 August 2022	42	1R	(Czech Republic) Marie Bouzková (Q)	47	Win	7–5, 6–7^{(3–7)}, 6–1
Canadian Open; Toronto, Canada; WTA 1000; Hard, outdoor; 8 August 2022 – 14 August 2022	43	2R	(United States) Coco Gauff (10)	11	Loss	4–6, 7–6^{(10–8)}, 6–7^{(3–7)}
Cincinnati Open; Mason, United States; WTA 1000; Hard, outdoor; 15 August 2022 – 21 August 2022	44	1R	(Egypt) Mayar Sherif	58	Win	6–3, 6–2
Cincinnati Open; Mason, United States; WTA 1000; Hard, outdoor; 15 August 2022 – 21 August 2022	45	2R	(Spain) Garbiñe Muguruza (8)	9	Win	6–3, 6–1
Cincinnati Open; Mason, United States; WTA 1000; Hard, outdoor; 15 August 2022 – 21 August 2022	46	3R	(United States) Alison Riske-Amritraj	29	Win	6–2, 6–4
Cincinnati Open; Mason, United States; WTA 1000; Hard, outdoor; 15 August 2022 – 21 August 2022	47	QF	(United States) Madison Keys	24	Loss	2–6, 4–6
US Open; New York City, United States; Grand Slam; Hard, outdoor; 29 August 2022 – 11 September 2022	48	1R	(France) Clara Burel (Q)	131	Loss	4–6, 4–6
Slovenia Open; Portorož, Slovenia; WTA 250; Hard, outdoor; 12 September 2022–18 September 2022	49	1R	(Germany) Laura Siegemund	173	Win	6–7^{(4–7)}, 6–4, 7–6^{(10–8)}
Slovenia Open; Portorož, Slovenia; WTA 250; Hard, outdoor; 12 September 2022–18 September 2022	50	2R	(Czech Republic) Tereza Martincová	66	Win	6–4, 6–1
Slovenia Open; Portorož, Slovenia; WTA 250; Hard, outdoor; 12 September 2022–18 September 2022	–	QF	(Ukraine) Lesia Tsurenko	92	Walkover	—N/a
Slovenia Open; Portorož, Slovenia; WTA 250; Hard, outdoor; 12 September 2022–18 September 2022	51	SF	(Romania) Ana Bogdan	65	Win	6–1, 6–1
Slovenia Open; Portorož, Slovenia; WTA 250; Hard, outdoor; 12 September 2022–18 September 2022	52	F	(Czech Republic) Kateřina Siniaková	82	Loss	7–6^{(7–4)}, 6–7^{(5–7)}, 4–6
Pan Pacific Open; Tokyo, Japan; WTA 500; Hard, outdoor; 19 September 2022–25 September 2022	53	1R	Liudmila Samsonova	30	Loss	2–6, 4–6
Ostrava Open; Ostrava, Czech Republic; WTA 500; Hard, indoor; 3 October 2022 – 9 October 2022	54	1R	(United States) Madison Keys	17	Win	5–7, 6–3, 6–3
Ostrava Open; Ostrava, Czech Republic; WTA 500; Hard, indoor; 3 October 2022 – 9 October 2022	55	2R	Aliaksandra Sasnovich	31	Win	6–7^{(5–7)}, 6–4, 7–5
Ostrava Open; Ostrava, Czech Republic; WTA 500; Hard, indoor; 3 October 2022 – 9 October 2022	56	QF	(Czech Republic) Petra Kvitová (WC)	20	Win	7–6^{(7–5)},, 6–4
Ostrava Open; Ostrava, Czech Republic; WTA 500; Hard, indoor; 3 October 2022 – 9 October 2022	57	SF	(Czech Republic) Barbora Krejčíková	23	Loss	6–3, 6–7^{(4–7)}, 4–6
Guadalajara Open; Mexico; WTA 1000; Hard, outdoor; 17 October 2022 – 25 October 2022	58	1R	(Czech Republic) Karolína Plíšková	20	Win	7–6^{(7–5)}, 6–2
Guadalajara Open; Mexico; WTA 1000; Hard, outdoor; 17 October 2022 – 25 October 2022	59	2R	(United States) Jessica Pegula (3)	5	Loss	6–2, 3–6, 6–7^{(8–10)}
Billie Jean King Cup finals; Glasgow, United Kingdom; Billie Jean King Cup; Hard, indoor; 8 November 2022–13 November 2022	60	RR	(United Kingdom) Harriet Dart	98	Win	6–1, 6–4
Billie Jean King Cup finals; Glasgow, United Kingdom; Billie Jean King Cup; Hard, indoor; 8 November 2022–13 November 2022	61	RR	(Spain) Paula Badosa	13	Loss	2–6, 6–3, 4–6

== Tournament schedule ==
=== Singles schedule ===
Date	Tournament	Location	Category	Surface	Previous result	Previous points	New points	Outcome
3 January 2022 – 9 January 2022	Adelaide International	Australia	WTA 500	Hard	—N/a	—N/a	305	Final lost to (Australia) Ashleigh Barty 3–6, 2–6
10 January 2022 – 15 January 2022	Sydney International	Australia	WTA 500	Hard	—N/a	—N/a	55	Withdrew prior to the second round
17 January 2022 – 30 January 2022	Australian Open	Australia	Grand Slam	Hard	2R	70	70	Second round lost to (China) Shuai Zhang 4–6, 0–1 ret.
7 February 2022 – 14 February 2022	St. Petersburg Ladies' Trophy	Russia	WTA 500	Hard	—N/a	—N/a	55	Withdrew prior to the second round
21 February 2022 – 27 February 2022	Qatar Open	Qatar	WTA 1000	Hard	1R	1	1	First round lost to (Romania) Jaqueline Cristian 4–6, 3–6
7 March 2022 – 20 March 2022	Indian Wells Open	United States	WTA 1000	Hard	1R	10	215	Quarterfinals lost to (Greece) Maria Sakkari 5–7, 4–6
21 March 2022 – 3 April 2022	Miami Open	United States	WTA 1000	Hard	3R	65	65	Third round lost to (United States) Jessica Pegula 3–6, 4–6
4 April 2022 – 10 April 2022	Charleston Open	United States	WTA 500	Clay	1R	1	1	Second round lost to (Ukraine) Anhelina Kalinina 4–6, 6–2, 4–6
18 April 2022 – 24 April 2022	Stuttgart Open	Germany	WTA 500	Clay (i)	—N/a	—N/a	55	Second round lost to (Spain) Paula Badosa 2–6, 6–4, 6–7^{(4–7)}
28 April 2022 – 7 May 2022	Madrid Open	Spain	WTA 1000	Clay	2R	65	120	Third round lost to (Switzerland) Jil Teichmann 3–6, 1–6
9 May 2022 – 15 May 2022	Italian Open	Italy	WTA 1000	Clay	—N/a	—N/a	105	Third round lost to (Switzerland) Jil Teichmann 7–6^{(7–3)}, 3–6, 5–7
22 May 2022 – 5 June 2022	French Open	France	Grand Slam	Clay	QF	430	130	Third round lost to (United States) Madison Keys 6–3, 1–6, 6–7^{(3–7)}
6 June – 12 June 2022	Rosmalen Open	Netherlands	WTA 250	Grass	—N/a	—N/a	30	Second round lost to (United States) Shelby Rogers 2–6, 4–6
19 June – 25 June 2022	German Open	Germany	WTA 500	Grass	2R	55	55	Second round lost to (Ukraine) Lesia Tsurenko 6–1 5–7 3–6
27 June 2022 – 10 July 2022	Wimbledon Championships	United Kingdom	Grand Slam	Grass	4R	240	—N/a (Note: Following the All England Lawn Tennis and Croquet Club's decision to ban Russian and Belarusian players from the 2022 Wimbledon Championships due to the Russian invasion of Ukraine, the ITF, ATP, and WTA stripped the event of ranking points.)	Winner, defeated (Tunisia) Ons Jabeur 3–6, 6–2, 6–2
1 August 2022 – 7 August 2022	Silicon Valley Classic	United States	WTA 500	Hard	QF	100	1	First round lost to Daria Kasatkina 6–1, 2–6, 0–6
8 August 2022 – 14 August 2022	Canadian Open	Canada	WTA 1000	Hard	1R	1	60	Second round lost to (United States) Coco Gauff 4–6, 7–6^{(10–8)}, 6–7^{(3–7)}
15 August 2022 – 21 August 2022	Cincinnati Open	United States	WTA 1000	Hard	3R	105	190	Quarterfinals lost to (United States) Madison Keys 2–6, 4–6
29 August 2022 – 11 September 2022	US Open	United States	Grand Slam	Hard	3R	130	10	First round lost to (France) Clara Burel 4–6, 4–6
12 September 2022– 18 September 2022	Slovenia Open	Slovenia	WTA 250	Hard	—N/a	—N/a	180	Final lost to (Czech Republic) Kateřina Siniaková 7–6^{(7–4)}, 6–7^{(5–7)}, 4–6
19 September 2022– 25 September 2022	Pan Pacific Open	Japan	WTA 500	Hard	—N/a	—N/a	1	First round lost to Liudmila Samsonova 2–6, 4–6
3 October 2022 – 9 October 2022	Ostrava Open	Czech Republic	WTA 500	Hard (i)	QF	100	185	Semifinals lost to (Czech Republic) Barbora Krejčíková 6–3, 6–7^{(4–7)}, 4–6
17 October 2022 – 25 October 2022	Guadalajara Open	Mexico	WTA 1000	Hard	—N/a	—N/a	60	Second round lost to (United Kingdom) Harriet Dart 6–1, 6–4
Total year-end points						2855	1860	▼995

== Yearly records ==
=== Head-to-head match-ups ===
Rybakina has a 40–21 WTA match win–loss record in the 2022 season. Her record against players who were part of the WTA rankings top ten at the time of their meetings is 2–4. Bold indicates player was ranked top 10 at the time of at least one meeting. The following list is ordered by number of wins:

=== Top 10 Record ===
Result	W–L	Player	Rank	Event	Surface	Rd	Score	Rank
Loss	0–1	(Australia) Ashleigh Barty	No. 1	Adelaide International 1, Australia	Hard	F	3–6, 2–6	No. 14
Loss	0–2	(Greece) Maria Sakkari	No. 6	Indian Wells Open, U.S.	Hard	QF	5–7, 4–6	No. 20
Loss	0–3	(Spain) Paula Badosa	No. 3	Stuttgart Open, Germany	Clay	2R	2–6, 6–4, 6–7^{(4–7)}	No. 19
Win	1–3	(Tunisia) Ons Jabeur	No. 2	Wimbledon, UK	Grass	F	3–6, 6–2, 6–2	No. 23
Win	2–3	(Spain) Garbiñe Muguruza	No. 9	Cincinnati Open, U.S.	Hard	2R	6–3, 6–1	No. 25
Loss	2–4	(United States) Jessica Pegula	No. 5	Guadalajara Open, Mexico	Hard	2R	6–2, 3–6, 6–7^{(8–10)}	No. 24

=== Finals ===
==== Singles: 3 (1 title, 2 runner-ups) ====
Legend
Grand Slam tournaments (1–0)
WTA 1000 (0–0)
WTA 500 (Premier) (0–1)
WTA 250 (International) (0–1)

Result	W–L	Date	Tournament	Tier	Surface	Opponent	Score
Loss	0–1	Jan 2022	Adelaide International, Australia	WTA 500	Hard	(Australia) Ashleigh Barty	3–6, 2–6
Win	1–1	Jul 2022	Wimbledon, United Kingdom	Grand Slam	Grass	(Tunisia) Ons Jabeur	3–6, 6–2, 6–2
Loss	1–2	Sep 2022	Slovenia Open, Slovenia	WTA 250	Hard	(Czech Republic) Kateřina Siniaková	7–6^{(7–4)}, 6–7^{(5–7)}, 4–6

=== Earnings ===
- **Bold** font denotes tournament win

#	Tournament	Singles Prize money	Doubles Prize money	Year-to-date
1.	Adelaide International 1	$66,800	$0	$66,800
2.	Sydney Tennis Classic	$10,000	$0	$76,800
3.	Australian Open	$115,873	$0	$192,673
4.	St. Petersburg Ladies' Trophy	$9,500	$0	$202,173
5.	Qatar Open	$10,820	$0	$212,993
6.	Indian Wells Open	$179,940	$8,790	$401,723
7.	Miami Open	$54,400	$8,790	$464,913
8.	Charleston Open	$5,420	$0	$470,333
9.	Stuttgart Open	$9,081	$0	$479,414
10.	Madrid Open	$112,524	$8,387	$600,325
11.	Italian Open	$28,730	$5,310	$634,365
12.	French Open	$133,038	$8,195	$775,598
13.	Libéma Open	$3,800	$900	$780,298
14.	Eastbourne International	$5,420	$0	$785,718
15.	**Wimbledon**	**$2,580,275**	$0	$3,365,993
16.	Silicon Valley Classic	$8,110	$2,100	$3,376,203
17.	Canadian Open	$17,445	$0	$3,393,648
18.	Cincinnati Open	$57,440	$0	$3,451,088
19.	US Open	$80,000	$0	$3,531,088
20.	Slovenia Open	$15,922	$0	$3,547,010
21.	Pan Pacific Open	$8,080	$0	$3,555,090
22.	Ostrava Open	$42,010	$0	$3,597,100
23.	Guadalajara Open	$16,340	$0	$3,613,440
**Total prize money**		**$3,570,968**	**$42,472**	**$3,613,440**

Figures in United States dollars (USD) unless noted.
