= Anett Kontaveit career statistics =

Tennis statistics of Anett Kontaveit

Career finals
Discipline	Type	Won	Lost	Total	WR
Singles	Grand Slam	–	–	–	–
Singles	Summer Olympics	–	–	–	–
Singles	WTA Finals	0	1	1	0.000
Singles	WTA 1000	0	2	2	0.000
Singles	WTA Tour	6	8 (Note: The final at the 2021 Grampians Trophy was not played due to scheduling conflicts related to the 2021 Australian Open and the COVID-19 pandemic; both players received Finalist/Runners-up prize money and ranking points.)	14	0.429
Singles	Total	6	11	17	0.353
Doubles	Grand Slam	–	–	–	–
Doubles	Summer Olympics	–	–	–	–
Doubles	WTA Finals	–	–	–	–
Doubles	WTA 1000	–	–	–	–
Doubles	WTA Tour	–	–	–	–
Doubles	Total	–	–	–	–
Total		6	11	17	0.353

This is a list of career statistics of Estonian tennis player Anett Kontaveit since her professional debut in 2010. So far, Kontaveit has won six WTA Tour level singles titles, winning four of them in 2021. She also has eleven singles and five doubles titles on the ITF Women's Circuit. At the 2020 Australian Open, she reached her first and so far only Grand Slam quarterfinals, but also became first Estonian to reach that stage there. As a junior, she reached one Grand Slam final at the 2012 US Open. In June 2022, she became world No. 2.

During the season of 2021, she set some records. In late October, after winning her fourth title of the year, she entered top 10 for the first time. In addition, she qualified for the WTA Finals, becoming the first Estonian to achieve that. Making her debut there, she cleared the group stage and later reached the final where she lost to Garbiñe Muguruza. At the year-end ranking of 2021, she became the first Estonian to finish a year inside the top 10. During the season of 2021, she had a record of 48 wins, tying with Ons Jabeur for the most wins on tour.

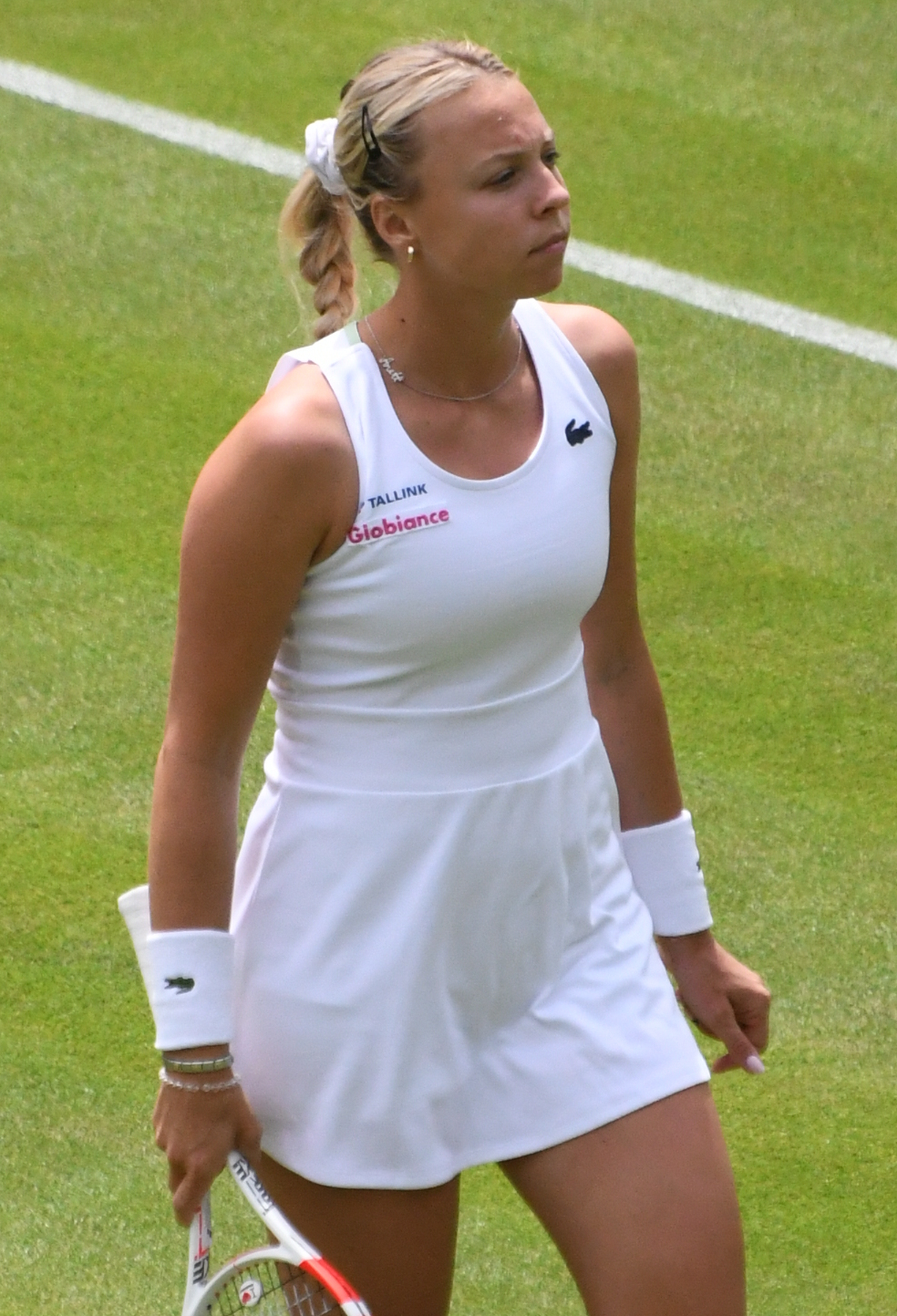
Kontaveit at the 2022 Wimbledon Championships

== Performance timelines ==
Key
W	F	SF	QF	#R	RR	Q#	P#	DNQ	A	Z#	PO	G	S	B	NMS	NTI	P	NH

(W) winner; (F) finalist; (SF) semifinalist; (QF) quarterfinalist; (#R) rounds 4, 3, 2, 1; (RR) round-robin stage; (Q#) qualification round; (P#) preliminary round; (DNQ) did not qualify; (A) absent; (Z#) Davis/Fed Cup Zonal Group (with number indication) or (PO) play-off; (G) gold, (S) silver or (B) bronze Olympic/Paralympic medal; (NMS) not a Masters tournament; (NTI) not a Tier I tournament; (P) postponed; (NH) not held; (SR) strike rate (events won / competed); (W–L) win–loss record.
To avoid confusion and double counting, these charts are updated at the conclusion of a tournament or when the player's participation has ended.

Only main-draw results in WTA Tour, Grand Slam tournaments, Fed Cup/Billie Jean King Cup and Olympic Games are included in win–loss records.

=== Singles ===
Tournament	2011	2012	2013	2014	2015	2016	2017	2018	2019	2020	2021	2022	2023	SR	W–L	Win %
Grand Slam tournaments
Australian Open	A	A	A	A	Q2	1R	1R	4R	2R	QF	3R	2R	2R	0 / 8	12–8	60%
French Open	A	A	A	Q3	Q2	1R	2R	4R	1R	1R	3R	1R	1R	0 / 8	6–8	43%
Wimbledon	A	A	A	1R	1R	1R	3R	3R	3R	NH	1R	2R	2R	0 / 9	8–9	47%
US Open	A	A	A	A	4R	1R	1R	1R	3R (Note: Kontaveit withdraw from the 2019 US Open before her third-round match against Belinda Bencic due to a viral illness.)	4R	3R	2R	A	0 / 8	11–7	61%
Win–loss	0–0	0–0	0–0	0–1	3–2	0–4	3–4	8–4	5–3	7–3	6–4	3–4	2–3	0 / 33	37–32	54%
Year-end championships
WTA Finals	DNQ									NH	F	DNQ		0 / 1	3–2	60%
WTA Elite Trophy	DNQ							RR	A	NH			DNQ	0 / 1	1–1	50%
National representation
Summer Olympics	NH	A	NH			A	NH				1R	NH		0 / 1	0–1	0%
Billie Jean King Cup (Note: Formerly known as Fed Cup until 2020.)	WG2	Z1	A	Z3	Z2	Z1	Z1	Z1	Z1	Z1 (Note: Edition is split into the two years due to COVID-19.)		A	Z2	0 / 0	25–8	76%
WTA 1000 tournaments
Dubai / Qatar Open (Note: The first Premier 5 event of the year has switched back and forth between the Dubai Tennis Championships and the Qatar Ladies Open since 2009. Dubai was classified as a Premier 5 event from 2009 to 2011 before being succeeded by Doha for the 2012–2014 period. In 2015, Dubai regained its Premier 5 status while Doha was demoted to Premier status. The two tournaments have since alternated status every year. The Premier 5 tournaments were reclassified as WTA 1000 tournaments in 2021.)	A	A	A	A	A	A	A	1R	1R	2R	3R	F	A	0 / 5	7–5	58%
Indian Wells Open	A	A	A	A	A	Q2	2R	2R	4R	NH	QF	3R	A	0 / 5	7–5	58%
Miami Open	A	A	1R	1R	A	Q1	3R	2R	SF	NH	3R	2R	A	0 / 7	7–7	50%
Madrid Open	A	A	A	A	A	A	1R	3R	1R	NH	2R	A	1R	0 / 5	3–5	43%
Italian Open	A	A	A	A	A	A	QF	SF	2R	2R	A	2R	2R	0 / 6	10–6	63%
Canadian Open	A	A	A	Q1	A	A	A	2R	3R	NH	1R	2R	A	0 / 4	3–4	43%
Cincinnati Open	A	A	A	A	A	Q1	1R	3R	3R	QF	1R	3R	A	0 / 6	8–6	57%
Pan Pac. / Wuhan Open (Note: In 2014, the Pan Pacific Open was downgraded to a Premier event and replaced by the Wuhan Open. The Premier 5 tournaments were reclassified as WTA 1000 tournaments in 2021.)	A	A	A	A	A	A	1R	F	A	NH				0 / 2	5–2	71%
China Open	A	A	A	A	A	A	1R	3R	A	NH			A	0 / 2	1–2	33%
Career statistics
	2011	2012	2013	2014	2015	2016	2017	2018	2019	2020	2021	2022	2023	Career		
Tournaments	0	0	1	5	6	16	20	23	17	11	21	17	8	Career total: 145		
Titles	0	0	0	0	0	0	1	0	0	0	4	1	0	Career total: 6		
Finals	0	0	0	0	0	0	3	1	1	1	7	4	0	Career total: 17		
Hard win–loss	0–2	0–0	0–1	0–2	5–4	10–10	9–13	19–15	18–9	16–8	39–12	22–11	2–4	5 / 95	140–91	61%
Clay win–loss	0–0	0–0	0–0	1–2	0–1	1–3	10–5	12–5	4–4	5–3	5–3	6–4	1–3	0 / 33	45–33	58%
Grass win–loss	0–0	0–0	0–0	0–1	0–1	2–3	7–1	2–3	3–3	0–0	4–2	1–1	1–1	1 / 17	20–16	56%
Overall win–loss	0–2	0–0	0–1	1–5	5–6	13–16	26–19	33–23	25–16	21–11	48–17	29–16	4–8	6 / 145	205–140	59%
Win (%)	0%	–	0%	17%	45%	45%	58%	59%	61%	65%	74%	64%	33%	Career total: 59%		
Year-end ranking	573	436	228	166	91	110	34	21	26	23	7	17	N/A	$8,038,120		

=== Doubles ===
Tournament	2015	2016	2017	2018	2019	2020	2021	2022	2023	SR	W–L	Win%
Grand Slam tournaments
Australian Open	A	A	A	A	2R	2R	1R	A	A	0 / 3	2–3	40%
French Open	A	A	A	A	3R	A	A	A	A	0 / 1	2–1	67%
Wimbledon	A	A	2R	1R	1R	NH	A	2R	A	0 / 4	2–4	33%
US Open	A	A	A	A	2R (Note: Kontaveit and Daria Kasatkina withdrew from the 2019 US Open before second-round match against Viktorija Golubic and Sara Sorribes Tormo.)	A	2R	A	A	0 / 2	2–1	67%
Win–loss	0–0	0–0	1–1	0–1	4–3	1–1	1–2	1–1	0–0	0 / 10	8–9	47%
WTA 1000 tournaments
Indian Wells Open	A	A	A	A	A	NH	1R	1R	A	0 / 2	0–2	0%
Madrid Open	A	A	A	A	1R	NH	A	A	A	0 / 1	0–1	0%
Canadian Open	A	A	A	A	QF	NH	2R	A	A	0 / 2	2–2	50%
Cincinnati Open	A	A	A	1R	2R	A	2R	2R	A	0 / 4	3–4	43%
Career statistics
Tournament	2015	2016	2017	2018	2019	2020	2021	2022	2023	SR	W–L	Win%
Tournaments	1	0	1	3	9	2	6	4	0	Career total: 26		
Titles	0	0	0	0	0	0	0	0	0	Career total: 0		
Finals	0	0	0	0	0	0	0	0	0	Career total: 0		
Hard win–loss	0–0	0–0	0–0	0–1	5–4	1–3	3–6	1–3	0–0	0 / 17	10–17	37%
Clay win–loss	2–1	0–0	0–0	0–0	2–2	0–0	0–0	1–1	0–0	0 / 4	5–4	56%
Grass win–loss	0–0	0–0	1–1	0–2	0–2	0–0	0–0	0–0	0–0	0 / 5	1–5	17%
Overall win–loss	2–1	0–0	1–1	0–3	7–8	1–3	3–6	2–4	0–0	0 / 26	16–26	38%
Win (%)	67%	–	50%	0%	47%	25%	33%	33%	–	Career total: 38%		
Year-end ranking	403	N/A	404	1080	103	110	211	506	N/A			

== Significant finals ==
=== WTA Finals ===
==== Singles: 1 (runner-up) ====
Result	Year	Location	Surface	Opponent	Score
Loss	2021	WTA Finals, Guadalajara	Hard	(Spain) Garbiñe Muguruza	3–6, 5–7

=== WTA 1000 tournaments ===
==== Singles: 2 (2 runner-ups) ====
Result	Year	Tournament	Surface	Opponent	Score
Loss	2018	Wuhan Open	Hard	(Belarus) Aryna Sabalenka	3–6, 3–6
Loss	2022	Qatar Open	Hard	(Poland) Iga Świątek	2–6, 0–6

== WTA Tour finals ==
=== Singles: 17 (6 titles, 11 runner-ups) ===
Legend WTA Finals (0–1) WTA 1000 (0–2) WTA 500 (3–3) WTA 250 (3–5)	Finals by surface Hard (5–6) Clay (0–4) Grass (1–1) Carpet (0–0)

Result	W–L	Date	Tournament	Tier	Surface	Opponent	Score
Loss	0–1	Apr 2017	Ladies Open Biel Bienne, Switzerland	International (Note: The WTA International tournaments were reclassified as WTA 250 tournaments in 2021.)	Hard (i)	(Czech Republic) Markéta Vondroušová	4–6, 6–7^{(6–8)}
Win	1–1	Jun 2017	Rosmalen Open, Netherlands	International	Grass	(Russia) Natalia Vikhlyantseva	6–2, 6–3
Loss	1–2	Jul 2017	Ladies Open Gstaad, Switzerland	International	Clay	(Netherlands) Kiki Bertens	4–6, 6–3, 1–6
Loss	1–3	Sep 2018	Wuhan Open, China	Premier 5 (Note: The WTA Premier 5 & Mandatory tournaments were reclassified as WTA 1000 tournaments in 2021.)	Hard	(Belarus) Aryna Sabalenka	3–6, 3–6
Loss	1–4	Apr 2019	Stuttgart Grand Prix, Germany	Premier (Note: The WTA Premier tournaments were reclassified as WTA 500 tournaments in 2021.)	Clay (i)	(Czech Republic) Petra Kvitová	3–6, 6–7^{(2–7)}
Loss	1–5	Aug 2020	Palermo Ladies Open, Italy	International	Clay	(France) Fiona Ferro	2–6, 5–7
Finalist	1–6	Feb 2021	Grampians Trophy, Australia	WTA 500	Hard	(United States) Ann Li	final cancelled
Loss	1–7	Jun 2021	Eastbourne International, United Kingdom	WTA 500	Grass	(Latvia) Jeļena Ostapenko	3–6, 3–6
Win	2–7	Aug 2021	Tennis in Cleveland, United States	WTA 250	Hard	(Romania) Irina-Camelia Begu	7–6^{(7–5)}, 6–4
Win	3–7	Sep 2021	Ostrava Open, Czech Republic	WTA 500	Hard (i)	(Greece) Maria Sakkari	6–2, 7–5
Win	4–7	Oct 2021	Kremlin Cup, Russia	WTA 500	Hard (i)	(Russia) Ekaterina Alexandrova	4–6, 6–4, 7–5
Win	5–7	Oct 2021	Transylvania Open, Romania	WTA 250	Hard (i)	(Romania) Simona Halep	6–2, 6–3
Loss	5–8	Nov 2021	WTA Finals, Mexico	WTA Finals	Hard	(Spain) Garbiñe Muguruza	3–6, 5–7
Win	6–8	Feb 2022	St. Petersburg Trophy, Russia	WTA 500	Hard (i)	(Greece) Maria Sakkari	5–7, 7–6^{(7–4)}, 7–5
Loss	6–9	Feb 2022	Qatar Ladies Open, Qatar	WTA 1000	Hard	(Poland) Iga Świątek	2–6, 0–6
Loss	6–10	Jul 2022	Hamburg European Open, Germany	WTA 250	Clay	(United States) Bernarda Pera	2–6, 4–6
Loss	6–11	Oct 2022	Tallinn Open, Estonia	WTA 250	Hard (i)	(Czech Republic) Barbora Krejčíková	2–6, 3–6

== ITF Circuit finals ==
=== Singles: 14 (11 titles, 3 runner–ups) ===
Legend $50/60,000 tournaments (2–0) $25,000 tournaments (2–2) $10/15,000 tournaments (7–1)	Finals by surface Hard (8–2) Clay (2–1) Grass (1–0)

Result	W–L	Date	Tournament	Tier	Surface	Opponent	Score
Win	1–0	Jan 2011	ITF Tallinn, Estonia	10,000	Hard (i)	(Slovakia) Zuzana Luknárová	6–4, 4–6, 6–2
Win	2–0	Aug 2011	ITF Savitaipale, Finland	10,000	Clay	(Netherlands) Lisanne van Riet	6–3, 6–1
Win	3–0	Oct 2011	ITF Stockholm, Sweden	10,000	Hard (i)	(Germany) Syna Kayser	6–4, 6–2
Win	4–0	Feb 2012	ITF Tallinn, Estonia (2)	10,000	Hard (i)	(Poland) Katarzyna Piter	7–5, 6–4
Win	5–0	Aug 2012	ITF San Luis Potosí, Mexico	10,000	Hard	(Mexico) Victoria Rodríguez	6–1, 6–1
Win	6–0	May 2013	ITF Marathon, Greece	10,000	Hard	(United Kingdom) Lucy Brown	6–4, 6–7^{(6–8)}, 6–3
Win	7–0	May 2013	ITF Moscow, Russia	25,000	Clay	(Turkey) Çağla Büyükakçay	6–1, 6–1
Win	8–0	Jul 2013	ITF Izmir, Turkey	10,000	Hard	(Turkey) Başak Eraydın	3–6, 7–6^{(7–4)}, 6–0
Loss	8–1	Sep 2013	Royal Cup, Montenegro	25,000	Clay	(Liechtenstein) Stephanie Vogt	4–6, 3–6
Win	9–1	Oct 2013	ITF Margaret River, Australia	25,000	Hard	(United States) Irina Falconi	6–2, 6–4
Loss	9–2	Feb 2014	ITF Tallinn, Estonia	15,000	Hard (i)	(Switzerland) Timea Bacsinszky	3–6, 3–6
Loss	9–3	Feb 2014	ITF Moscow, Russia	25,000	Hard (i)	(Belarus) Aliaksandra Sasnovich	3–6, 2–6
Win	10–3	Jun 2015	Eastbourne Trophy, United Kingdom	50,000	Grass	(Russia) Alla Kudryavtseva	7–6^{(7–4)}, 7–6^{(7–2)}
Win	11–3	Jan 2017	Open Andrézieux-Bouthéon, France	60,000	Hard (i)	(Serbia) Ivana Jorović	6–4, 7–6^{(7–5)}

=== Doubles: 8 (5 titles, 3 runner–ups) ===
Legend $50,000 tournaments (1–0) $25,000 tournaments (1–1) $10,000 tournaments (3–2)	Finals by surface Hard (3–2) Clay (2–1) Grass (0–0)

Result	W–L	Date	Tournament	Tier	Surface	Partner	Opponents	Score
Loss	0–1	Jan 2011	ITF Tallinn, Estonia	10,000	Hard (i)	(Estonia) Maret Ani	(Serbia) Tamara Čurović (Ukraine) Yevgeniya Kryvoruchko	6–7^{(6–8)}, 1–6
Win	1–1	Aug 2012	ITF San Luis Potosí, Mexico	10,000	Hard	(New Zealand) Emily Fanning	(United States) Erin Clark (United States) Elizabeth Ferris	6–0, 6–3
Win	2–1	Mar 2013	ITF Tallinn, Estonia	25,000	Hard (i)	(Latvia) Jeļena Ostapenko	(Ukraine) Lyudmyla Kichenok (Ukraine) Nadiia Kichenok	2–6, 7–5, [10–0]
Win	3–1	Apr 2013	ITF Edinburgh, United Kingdom	10,000	Clay	(United Kingdom) Jessica Ren	(United Kingdom) Anna Smith (United Kingdom) Francesca Stephenson	6–2, 6–3
Loss	3–2	May 2013	ITF Marathon, Greece	10,000	Hard	(United Kingdom) Laura Deigman	(North Macedonia) Lina Gjorcheska (Greece) Despoina Vogasari	4–6, 6–2, [6–10]
Win	4–2	Jul 2013	ITF Izmir, Turkey	10,000	Hard	(Russia) Polina Leykina	(Turkey) Hülya Esen (Turkey) Lütfiye Esen	6–4, 7–5
Loss	4–3	Sep 2013	ITF Moscow, Russia	25,000	Clay	(Ukraine) Olga Ianchuk	(Ukraine) Anna Shkudun (Ukraine) Alyona Sotnikova	3–6, 4–6
Win	5–3	Apr 2014	Dothan Pro Classic, United States	50,000	Clay	(Belarus) Ilona Kremen	(United States) Shelby Rogers (Australia) Olivia Rogowska	6–1, 5–7, [10–5]

== Junior Grand Slam tournament finals ==
=== Girls' singles: 1 (runner–up) ===
Result	Year	Tournament	Surface	Opponent	Score
Loss	2012	US Open	Hard	(United States) Samantha Crawford	5–7, 3–6

== WTA ranking ==
Current after the 2022 Cincinnati Open.

Year	2011	2012	2013	2014	2015	2016	2017	2018	2019	2020	2021	2022	Career
Singles
Highest ranking	567	400	228	139	88	73	27	20	14	20	7	2	2
Lowest ranking	863	658	435	233	195	126	125	34	26	31	31	9	863
Year-end ranking	573	436	228	166	91	110	34	21	26	23	7		7
Doubles
Highest ranking	955	969	285	260	389	409	394	407	102	95	104	219	95
Lowest ranking													
Year-end ranking	955	1083	290	451	403	n/a	404	1080	103	110	211		103

== WTA Tour career earnings ==
Current after the 2022 Tallinn Open

Year	Grand Slam singles titles	WTA singles titles	Total singles titles	Earnings ($)	Money list rank
2010	0	0	0	392	n/a
2011	0	0	0	6,712	n/a
2012	0	0	0	8,626	529
2013	0	0	0	29,110	286
2014	0	0	0	90,708	188
2015	0	0	0	305,304	106
2016	0	0	0	225,905	125
2017	0	1	1	598,203	55
2018	0	0	0	1,513,329	28
2019	0	0	0	1,220,473	33
2020	0	0	0	877,952	16
2021	0	4	4	1,908,757	12
2022	0	1	1	991,473	37
Career	0	6	6	7,776,943	85

== Grand Slam statistics ==
=== Seedings ===
Year	Australian Open	French Open	Wimbledon	US Open
2014	did not play	did not qualify	unseeded	did not play
2015	did not qualify	did not qualify	unseeded	unseeded
2016	unseeded	unseeded	unseeded	unseeded
2017	unseeded	unseeded	unseeded	26th
2018	32nd	25th	28th	28th
2019	20th	17th	20th	21st
2020	28th	17th	cancelled	14th
2021	21st	30th	24th	28th
2022	6th	5th	2nd	2nd

=== Best Grand Slam results details ===
Australian Open
2020 Australian Open (28th seed)
Round	Opponent	Rank	Score
1R	(Australia) Astra Sharma (WC)	111	6–0, 6–2
2R	(Spain) Sara Sorribes Tormo	91	6–2, 4–6, 6–1
3R	(Switzerland) Belinda Bencic (6)	7	6–0, 6–1
4R	(Poland) Iga Świątek	56	6–7^{(4–7)}, 7–5, 7–5
QF	(Romania) Simona Halep	3	1–6, 1–6

Wimbledon Championships
2017 Wimbledon (not seeded)
Round	Opponent	Rank	Score
1R	(Spain) Lara Arruabarrena	52	6–2, 6–4
2R	(Russia) Daria Kasatkina (29)	30	6–3, 6–2
3R	(Denmark) Caroline Wozniacki (5)	6	6–3, 6–7^{(3–7)}, 2–6
2018 Wimbledon (28th seed)
Round	Opponent	Rank	Score
1R	(Czech Republic) Denisa Allertová	98	6–2, 6–2
2R	(United States) Jennifer Brady	74	6–2, 7–6^{(7–4)}
3R	(Belgium) Alison Van Uytvanck	47	2–6, 3–6

French Open
2018 French Open (25th seed)
Round	Opponent	Rank	Score
1R	(United States) Madison Brengle	101	6–1, 4–6, 6–2
2R	(Romania) Alexandra Dulgheru (Q)	159	7–5, 6–2
3R	(Czech Republic) Petra Kvitová (8)	8	7–6^{(8–6)}, 7–6^{(7–4)}
4R	(United States) Sloane Stephens (10)	10	2–6, 0–6

US Open
2015 US Open (not seeded)
Round	Opponent	Rank	Score
1R	(Australia) Casey Dellacqua	60	7–5, 6–2
2R	(Russia) Anastasia Pavlyuchenkova (31)	31	7–5, 6–4
3R	(United States) Madison Brengle	47	6–2, 3–6, 6–0
4R	(United States) Venus Williams (23)	23	2–6, 1–6

== Head-to-head records ==
=== Top 10 wins ===
Season	2017	2018	2019	2020	2021	2022	Total
Wins	2	6	1	2	7	3	21

#	Opponent	Rk	Event	Surface	Rd	Score	Rk
2017
1.	(Spain) Garbiñe Muguruza	6	Stuttgart Open, Germany	Clay	2R	2–6, 7–6^{(7–1)}, 6–1	73
2.	(Germany) Angelique Kerber	1	Italian Open	Clay	2R	6–4, 6–0	68
2018
3.	(Latvia) Jeļena Ostapenko	7	Australian Open	Hard	3R	6–3, 1–6, 6–3	33
4.	(United States) Venus Williams	8	Madrid Open, Spain	Clay	1R	3–6, 6–3, 6–2	29
5.	(United States) Venus Williams	9	Italian Open	Clay	3R	6–2, 7–6^{(7–3)}	26
6.	(Denmark) Caroline Wozniacki	2	Italian Open, Italy	Clay	QF	6–3, 6–1	26
7.	(Czech Republic) Petra Kvitová	8	French Open, France	Clay	3R	7–6^{(8–6)}, 7–6^{(7–4)}	24
8.	(United States) Sloane Stephens	9	Wuhan Open, China	Hard	1R	4–6, 7–5, 6–4	27
2019
9.	(Czech Republic) Petra Kvitová	7	Brisbane International, Australia	Hard	2R	7–5, 7–6^{(7–1)}	20
2020
10.	(Switzerland) Belinda Bencic	7	Australian Open	Hard	3R	6–0, 6–1	31
11.	(Ukraine) Elina Svitolina	4	Fed Cup, Estonia	Hard (i)	ZPO	6–3, 6–7^{(5–7)}, 6–2	22
2021
12.	(United States) Sofia Kenin	4	Stuttgart Open, Germany	Clay (i)	2R	7–5, 6–4	27
13.	(Canada) Bianca Andreescu	7	Eastbourne International, UK	Grass	2R	6–3, 6–3	27
14.	(Czech Republic) Petra Kvitová	10	Ostrava Open, Czech Republic	Hard (i)	SF	6–0, 6–4	30
15.	(Spain) Garbiñe Muguruza	5	Kremlin Cup, Russia	Hard (i)	QF	6–1, 6–1	20
16.	(Czech Republic) Barbora Krejčíková	3	WTA Finals, Guadalajara	Hard	RR	6–3, 6–4	8
17.	(Czech Republic) Karolína Plíšková	4	WTA Finals, Guadalajara	Hard	RR	6–4, 6–0	8
18.	(Greece) Maria Sakkari	6	WTA Finals, Guadalajara	Hard	SF	6–1, 3–6, 6–3	8
2022
19.	(Tunisia) Ons Jabeur	10	Sydney International, Australia	Hard	QF	6–4, ret.	7
20.	(Greece) Maria Sakkari	7	St. Petersburg Trophy, Russia	Hard (i)	F	5–7, 7–6^{(7–4)}, 7–5	9
21.	(Tunisia) Ons Jabeur	10	Qatar Ladies Open	Hard	QF	6–4, 6–1	7

=== Double bagel matches (6–0, 6–0) ===
Result	Year	W–L	Tournament	Tier	Surface	Opponent	Rank	Rd	AKR
Win	2013	1–0	Bendigo International, Australia	50,000	Hard	(New Zealand) Emma Hayman	No. 735	1R	No. 238
Win	2014	2–0	ITF Tallinn, Estonia	15,000	Hard	(Belgium) Ysaline Bonaventure	No. 291	1R	No. 233
Win	2014	3–0	ITF Moscow, Russia	25,000	Hard	(Russia) Valentina Ivakhnenko	No. 255	1R	No. 231
Win	2016	4–0	Eastbourne International, UK	Premier	Grass	(United States) Irina Falconi	No. 72	Q1	No. 96

=== Matches without dropping/winning a single game ===
Result	Year	Tournament	Tier	Surface	Opponent	Rank	Rd	AKR	Score
Win	2018	Stuttgart Open, Germany	Premier	Clay (i)	(Germany) Angelique Kerber	No. 12	2R	No. 31	6–0, 2–0 ret.
Win	2019	Indian Wells Open, United States	Premier M	Hard	(Latvia) Anastasija Sevastova	No. 11	3R	No. 21	5–0 ret.
Win	2022	Hamburg Open, Germany	WTA 250	Clay	(Germany) Andrea Petkovic	No. 67	QF	No. 2	6–0, 2–0 ret.

== Longest winning streaks ==
=== 12-match win streak (2021) ===
#	Tournament	Category	Start date	Surface	Rd	Opponent	Rank	Score
–	Indian Wells Open	WTA 1000	6 October 2021	Hard	QF	(Tunisia) Ons Jabeur (12)	No. 14	5–7, 3–6
1	Kremlin Cup	WTA 500	18 October 2021	Hard (i)	1R	(Czech Republic) Kateřina Siniaková	No. 50	6–3, 6–3
2	Kremlin Cup	WTA 500	18 October 2021	Hard (i)	2R	(Germany) Andrea Petkovic	No. 79	6–1, 6–4
3	Kremlin Cup	WTA 500	18 October 2021	Hard (i)	QF	(Spain) Garbiñe Muguruza (2)	No. 5	6–1, 6–1
4	Kremlin Cup	WTA 500	18 October 2021	Hard (i)	SF	(Czech Republic) Markéta Vondroušová	No. 35	6–3, 6–4
5	Kremlin Cup	WTA 500	18 October 2021	Hard (i)	F	(Russia) Ekaterina Alexandrova	No. 37	4–6, 6–4, 7–5
6	Transylvania Open	WTA 250	25 October 2021	Hard (i)	1R	(Serbia) Aleksandra Krunić (Q)	No. 140	6–3, 7–5
7	Transylvania Open	WTA 250	25 October 2021	Hard (i)	2R	(Belgium) Alison Van Uytvanck	No. 61	6–3, 6–4
8	Transylvania Open	WTA 250	25 October 2021	Hard (i)	QF	(Ukraine) Anhelina Kalinina (8)	No. 59	6–3, 6–1
9	Transylvania Open	WTA 250	25 October 2021	Hard (i)	SF	(Sweden) Rebecca Peterson	No. 99	6–3, 6–2
10	Transylvania Open	WTA 250	25 October 2021	Hard (i)	F	(Romania) Simona Halep (1)	No. 18	6–2, 6–3
11	WTA Finals	WTA Finals	10 November 2021	Hard	RR	(Czech Republic) Barbora Krejčíková (2)	No. 3	6–3, 6–4
12	WTA Finals	WTA Finals	10 November 2021	Hard	RR	(Czech Republic) Karolína Plíšková (3)	No. 4	6–4, 6–0
–	WTA Finals	WTA Finals	10 November 2021	Hard	RR	(Spain) Garbiñe Muguruza (6)	No. 5	4–6, 4–6

=== 22-match indoor court winning streak (2021–22) ===
#	Tournament	Category	Start date	Surface	Rd	Opponent	Rank	Score
–	Stuttgart Open	WTA 500	19 April 2021	Clay (i)	QF	(Belarus) Aryna Sabalenka (5)	No. 7	5–7, 6–4, 1–6
1	Ostrava Open	WTA 500	20 September 2021	Hard (i)	1R	(Romania) Sorana Cîrstea	No. 37	6–4, 6–4
2	Ostrava Open	WTA 500	20 September 2021	Hard (i)	2R	(Spain) Paula Badosa (9)	No. 27	6–3, 6–4
3	Ostrava Open	WTA 500	20 September 2021	Hard (i)	QF	(Switzerland) Belinda Bencic (3)	No. 11	6–4, 6–3
4	Ostrava Open	WTA 500	20 September 2021	Hard (i)	SF	(Czech Republic) Petra Kvitová (2)	No. 10	6–0, 6–4
5	Ostrava Open	WTA 500	20 September 2021	Hard (i)	F	(Greece) Maria Sakkari (4)	No. 12	6–2, 7–5
6	Kremlin Cup	WTA 500	18 October 2021	Hard (i)	1R	(Czech Republic) Kateřina Siniaková	No. 50	6–3, 6–3
7	Kremlin Cup	WTA 500	18 October 2021	Hard (i)	2R	(Germany) Andrea Petkovic	No. 79	6–1, 6–4
8	Kremlin Cup	WTA 500	18 October 2021	Hard (i)	QF	(Spain) Garbiñe Muguruza (2)	No. 5	6–1, 6–1
9	Kremlin Cup	WTA 500	18 October 2021	Hard (i)	SF	(Czech Republic) Markéta Vondroušová	No. 35	6–3, 6–4
10	Kremlin Cup	WTA 500	18 October 2021	Hard (i)	F	(Russia) Ekaterina Alexandrova	No. 37	4–6, 6–4, 7–5
11	Transylvania Open	WTA 250	25 October 2021	Hard (i)	1R	(Serbia) Aleksandra Krunić (Q)	No. 140	6–3, 7–5
12	Transylvania Open	WTA 250	25 October 2021	Hard (i)	2R	(Belgium) Alison Van Uytvanck	No. 61	6–3, 6–4
13	Transylvania Open	WTA 250	25 October 2021	Hard (i)	QF	(Ukraine) Anhelina Kalinina (8)	No. 59	6–3, 6–1
14	Transylvania Open	WTA 250	25 October 2021	Hard (i)	SF	(Sweden) Rebecca Peterson	No. 99	6–3, 6–2
15	Transylvania Open	WTA 250	25 October 2021	Hard (i)	F	(Romania) Simona Halep (1)	No. 18	6–2, 6–3
16	St. Petersburg Trophy	WTA 500	7 February 2022	Hard (i)	1R	(Switzerland) Jil Teichmann	No. 35	6–3, 1–6, 6–3
17	St. Petersburg Trophy	WTA 500	7 February 2022	Hard (i)	2R	(Romania) Sorana Cîrstea	No. 31	6–4, 7–5
18	St. Petersburg Trophy	WTA 500	7 February 2022	Hard (i)	QF	(Switzerland) Belinda Bencic (5)	No. 24	7–6^{(9–7)}, 6–2
19	St. Petersburg Trophy	WTA 500	7 February 2022	Hard (i)	SF	(Latvia) Jeļena Ostapenko (7)	No. 25	6–3, 6–4
20	St. Petersburg Trophy	WTA 500	7 February 2022	Hard (i)	F	(Greece) Maria Sakkari (1)	No. 7	5–7, 7–6^{(7–4)}, 7–5
21	Stuttgart Open	WTA 500	18 April 2022	Clay (i)	1R	(Germany) Angelique Kerber	No. 17	3–6, 6–4, 6–4
22	Stuttgart Open	WTA 500	18 April 2022	Clay (i)	2R	Ekaterina Alexandrova	No. 39	2–6, 6–3, 7–6^{(7–5)}
–	Stuttgart Open	WTA 500	18 April 2022	Clay (i)	QF	Aryna Sabalenka (3)	No. 4	4–6, 6–3, 1–6
