= 2022 Zavarovalnica Sava Portorož – Doubles =

Doubles
- 2022 Zavarovalnica Sava Portorož

Final
- Champions: (Ukraine) Marta Kostyuk (Czech Republic) Tereza Martincová
- Runners-up: (Spain) Cristina Bucșa (Slovakia) Tereza Mihalíková
- Score: 6–4, 6–0

Events
Singles	Doubles
← 2021 ·	WTA Slovenia Open	· 2023 →

Marta Kostyuk and Tereza Martincová defeated the defending champion Tereza Mihalíková and her partner Cristina Bucșa in the final, 6–4, 6–0 to win the doubles tennis title at the 2022 WTA Slovenia Open. It was Kostyuk's as well as Martincová's first WTA Tour doubles title.

Anna Kalinskaya and Mihalíková were the reigning champions, but Kalinskaya withdrew before the tournament.

== Seeds ==
1. (Slovenia) Andreja Klepač / (Germany) Laura Siegemund (quarterfinals)
2. Anastasia Potapova / Yana Sizikova (quarterfinals)
3. (United Kingdom) Alicia Barnett / (United Kingdom) Olivia Nicholls (first round)
4. Ekaterina Alexandrova / (Germany) Vivian Heisen (quarterfinals)

== Draw ==
=== Key ===
- Q = Qualifier
- WC = Wild card
- LL = Lucky loser
- Alt = Alternate
- SE = Special exempt
- PR = Protected ranking
- ITF = ITF entry
- JE = Junior exempt
- w/o = Walkover
- r = Retired
- d = Defaulted
- SR = Special ranking

=== Draw ===
First round
1	(Slovenia) A Klepač (Germany) L Siegemund	6	2	[10]
Alt	(Uzbekistan) N Abduraimova (United Kingdom) J Burrage	4	6	[6]
A Gabueva; A Zakharova	1	4
(United Kingdom) H Dart; A Panova	6	6
4	E Alexandrova (Germany) V Heisen	6	5	[10]
(Germany) A-L Friedsam (Slovenia) K Juvan	2	7	[3]
(Ukraine) M Kostyuk (Czech Republic) T Martincová	w/o
(Romania) A Bogdan (Romania) E-G Ruse
WC	(Hungary) T Babos (Slovenia) T Zidanšek	6	6
(Germany) T Morderger (Germany) Y Morderger	2	1
A Fomina-Klotz (Brazil) I Gamarra Martins	2	6	[10]
3	(United Kingdom) A Barnett (United Kingdom) O Nicholls	6	2	[6]
(Spain) C Bucșa (Slovakia) T Mihalíková	6	6
WC	(Slovenia) P Lovrič (Slovenia) L Smejkal	2	1
(Hungary) A Nagy (Slovenia) N Radišić	4	3
2	A Potapova; Y Sizikova	6	6

Quarterfinals
1	(Slovenia) A Klepač (Germany) L Siegemund	5	2
(United Kingdom) H Dart; A Panova	7	6
4	E Alexandrova (Germany) V Heisen	4	6^{2}
(Ukraine) M Kostyuk (Czech Republic) T Martincová	6	7^{7}
WC	(Hungary) T Babos (Slovenia) T Zidanšek	4	6	[8]
A Fomina-Klotz (Brazil) I Gamarra Martins	6	2	[10]
(Spain) C Bucșa (Slovakia) T Mihalíková	7^{7}	0	[10]
2	A Potapova; Y Sizikova	6^{4}	6	[6]

Semifinals
(United Kingdom) H Dart; A Panova	6	2	[6]
(Ukraine) M Kostyuk (Czech Republic) T Martincová	4	6	[10]
A Fomina-Klotz (Brazil) I Gamarra Martins	7	3	[6]
(Spain) C Bucșa (Slovakia) T Mihalíková	5	6	[10]

Final
(Ukraine) M Kostyuk (Czech Republic) T Martincová	6	6
(Spain) C Bucșa (Slovakia) T Mihalíková	4	0
