= 2022 St. Petersburg Ladies' Trophy – Doubles =

Doubles
- 2022 St. Petersburg Ladies' Trophy

Final
- Champions: (Russia) Anna Kalinskaya (United States) Caty McNally
- Runners-up: (Poland) Alicja Rosolska (New Zealand) Erin Routliffe
- Score: 6–3, 6–7^{(5–7)}, [10–4]

Details
- Draw: 16
- Seeds: 4

Events
Singles	Doubles
- St. Petersburg Ladies' Trophy

Anna Kalinskaya and Caty McNally defeated Alicja Rosolska and Erin Routliffe in the final, 6–3, 6–7^{(5–7)}, [10–4] to win the doubles tennis title at the 2022 St. Petersburg Ladies' Trophy.

Nadiia Kichenok and Raluca Olaru were the reigning champions, but Kichenok chose not to participate. Olaru partnered Sorana Cîrstea, but lost to Anastasia Potapova and Vera Zvonareva in the second round.

== Seeds ==
1. (Russia) Veronika Kudermetova / (Belgium) Elise Mertens (withdrew)
2. (Ukraine) Lyudmyla Kichenok / (Latvia) Jeļena Ostapenko (first round)
3. (China) Xu Yifan / (China) Yang Zhaoxuan (first round)
4. (Japan) Eri Hozumi / (Japan) Makoto Ninomiya (first round)

== Draw ==
Key

- Q = Qualifier
- WC = Wild card
- LL = Lucky loser
- Alt = Alternate
- ITF = ITF entry
- PR = Protected ranking
- SR = Special ranking
- SE = Special exempt
- JE = Junior exempt
- JR = Junior Accelerator Programme entrant
- CO = College Accelerator Programme entrant
- NG = Next Gen Accelerator Program entrant
- w/o = Walkover
- r = Retired
- d = Defaulted

=== Draw ===
First round
Alt	(Russia) E Alexandrova (Russia) Y Sizikova	6	6
(Germany) V Heisen (Germany) J Lohoff	1	3
(France) E Lechemia (United States) S Santamaria	5	6^{3}
(Russia) N Dzalamidze (Russia) A Panova	7	7^{7}
3	(China) Y Xu (China) Z Yang	4	6	[5]
(Poland) A Rosolska (New Zealand) E Routliffe	6	3	[10]
(United States) K Christian (Belarus) L Marozava	6^{4}	4
(Norway) U Eikeri (Slovakia) V Kužmová	7^{7}	6
(Belgium) A Van Uytvanck (China) S Zhang	6	3	[4]
WC	(Russia) K Rakhimova (Russia) E Shalimova	3	6	[10]
(Russia) A Kalinskaya (United States) C McNally	6	6
4	(Japan) E Hozumi (Japan) M Ninomiya	4	1
(Russia) A Potapova (Russia) V Zvonareva	6	7
(Romania) I Bara (Georgia (country)) E Gorgodze	2	5
(Romania) S Cîrstea (Romania) R Olaru	2	6	[10]
2	(Ukraine) L Kichenok (Latvia) J Ostapenko	6	4	[2]

Quarterfinals
Alt	(Russia) E Alexandrova (Russia) Y Sizikova	6	5	[6]
(Russia) N Dzalamidze (Russia) A Panova	2	7	[10]
(Poland) A Rosolska (New Zealand) E Routliffe	6	6
(Norway) U Eikeri (Slovakia) V Kužmová	4	1
WC	(Russia) K Rakhimova (Russia) E Shalimova	4	3
(Russia) A Kalinskaya (United States) C McNally	6	6
(Russia) A Potapova (Russia) V Zvonareva	6	6
(Romania) S Cîrstea (Romania) R Olaru	4	4

Semifinals
(Russia) N Dzalamidze (Russia) A Panova	5	4
(Poland) A Rosolska (New Zealand) E Routliffe	7	6
(Russia) A Kalinskaya (United States) C McNally	6	5	[14]
(Russia) A Potapova (Russia) V Zvonareva	2	7	[12]

Final
(Poland) A Rosolska (New Zealand) E Routliffe	3	7^{7}	[4]
(Russia) A Kalinskaya (United States) C McNally	6	6^{5}	[10]
