= 2022 Silicon Valley Classic – Doubles =

Doubles
- 2022 Silicon Valley Classic

Final
- Champions: (China) Xu Yifan (China) Yang Zhaoxuan
- Runners-up: (Japan) Shuko Aoyama (Chinese Taipei) Chan Hao-ching
- Score: 7–5, 6–0

Events
Singles	Doubles
← 2021 ·	Silicon Valley Classic

Xu Yifan and Yang Zhaoxuan defeated Shuko Aoyama and Chan Hao-ching in the final, 7–5, 6–0 to win the doubles tennis title at the 2022 Silicon Valley Classic.

Darija Jurak Schreiber and Andreja Klepač were the reigning champions, but chose not to defend their title.

== Seeds ==
1. Veronika Kudermetova / (China) Zhang Shuai (semifinals)
2. (Canada) Gabriela Dabrowski / (Mexico) Giuliana Olmos (semifinals)
3. (United States) Desirae Krawczyk / (Netherlands) Demi Schuurs (quarterfinals)
4. (China) Xu Yifan / (China) Yang Zhaoxuan (champions)

== Draw ==
=== Key ===
- Q = Qualifier
- WC = Wild card
- LL = Lucky loser
- Alt = Alternate
- SE = Special exempt
- PR = Protected ranking
- ITF = ITF entry
- JE = Junior exempt
- w/o = Walkover
- r = Retired
- d = Defaulted
- SR = Special ranking

=== Draw ===
First round
1	V Kudermetova (China) S Zhang	6	6
(United States) N Melichar-Martinez (Australia) E Perez	2	4
(United States) C Dolehide (Australia) S Sanders	6	7^{7}
(Georgia (country)) N Dzalamidze; K Rakhimova	3	6^{3}
4	(China) Y Xu (China) Z Yang	6	6
(Ukraine) N Kichenok (Slovakia) T Mihalíková	3	3
(United States) A Muhammad (United States) T Townsend	2	6^{4}
WC	(Chinese Taipei) L Chan (Brazil) B Haddad Maia	6	7^{7}
(Japan) S Aoyama (Chinese Taipei) H-c Chan	7^{12}	6
(Japan) E Hozumi (Japan) M Ninomiya	6^{10}	4
A Anshba (Kazakhstan) E Rybakina	2	2
3	(United States) D Krawczyk (Netherlands) D Schuurs	6	6
(Czech Republic) Ka Plíšková (Switzerland) J Teichmann	6^{5}	1
WC	(United States) A Krueger (United States) E Mandlik	7^{7}	6
(United States) E Bektas (United States) K Christian	3	2
2	(Canada) G Dabrowski (Mexico) G Olmos	6	6

Quarterfinals
1	V Kudermetova (China) S Zhang	6	5	[10]
(United States) C Dolehide (Australia) S Sanders	2	7	[8]
4	(China) Y Xu (China) Z Yang	w/o
WC	(Chinese Taipei) L Chan (Brazil) B Haddad Maia
(Japan) S Aoyama (Chinese Taipei) H-c Chan	6	6
3	(United States) D Krawczyk (Netherlands) D Schuurs	3	3
WC	(United States) A Krueger (United States) E Mandlik	6	1	[5]
2	(Canada) G Dabrowski (Mexico) G Olmos	2	6	[10]

Semifinals
1	V Kudermetova (China) S Zhang	7	2	[7]
4	(China) Y Xu (China) Z Yang	5	6	[10]
(Japan) S Aoyama (Chinese Taipei) H-c Chan	2	7^{7}	[10]
2	(Canada) G Dabrowski (Mexico) G Olmos	6	6^{4}	[3]

Final
4	(China) Y Xu (China) Z Yang	7	6
(Japan) S Aoyama (Chinese Taipei) H-c Chan	5	0
