= 2022 Zavarovalnica Sava Portorož =

- Date: 12–18 September
- Edition: 8th
- Category: WTA 250
- Draw: 32S / 24Q / 16D
- Surface: Hard
- Location: Portorož, Slovenia

Champions

Singles
- (Czech Republic) Kateřina Siniaková

Doubles
- (Ukraine) Marta Kostyuk / (Czech Republic) Tereza Martincová
← 2021 ·	Slovenia Open	· 2023 →

The 2022 WTA Slovenia Open (also known as the Zavarovalnica Sava Portorož for sponsorship purposes) is a WTA 250 tournament play on outdoor hard courts. It is the 8th edition of the Slovenia Open. The 2022 event took place at the Tennis Club Portorož in Portorož, Slovenia from 12 to 18 September 2022.

The event was held on the second consecutive year in the alternative sporting calendar, however, it was one of the six tournaments that were given single-year WTA 250 licenses in September and October 2022 due to the cancellation of tournaments in China during the 2022 season because of the ongoing COVID-19 pandemic, as well as the suspension of tournaments in China following former WTA player Peng Shuai's allegation of sexual assault against a Chinese government official.

== Champions ==
=== Singles ===
- (Czech Republic) Kateřina Siniaková def. (Kazakhstan) Elena Rybakina, 6–7^{(4–7)}, 7–6^{(7–5)}, 6–4

This was Siniaková's third WTA Tour singles title, and her first since 2017.

=== Doubles ===
- (Ukraine) Marta Kostyuk / (Czech Republic) Tereza Martincová def. (Spain) Cristina Bucșa / (Slovakia) Tereza Mihalíková 6–4, 6–0

== Singles main draw entrants ==
=== Seeds ===
Country	Player	Rank^{†}	Seed
GBR	Emma Raducanu	11	1
BRA	Beatriz Haddad Maia	15	2
KAZ	Elena Rybakina	25	3
ITA	Martina Trevisan	27	4
	Ekaterina Alexandrova	28	5
FRA	Alizé Cornet	40	6
~~USA~~	~~Bernarda Pera~~	~~45~~	~~7~~
AUS	Ajla Tomljanović	46	8
	Anastasia Potapova	52	9

^{†} Rankings are as of 29 August 2022.

=== Other entrants ===
The following players received wildcard entry into the singles main draw:

- (United States) Elizabeth Mandlik
- (Croatia) Petra Marčinko
- (United Kingdom) Emma Raducanu

The following player received entry into the singles main draw with a special ranking:

- (Germany) Laura Siegemund

The following players received entry from the qualifying draw:

- (Spain) Cristina Bucșa
- (United Kingdom) Jodie Burrage
- (Germany) Anna-Lena Friedsam
- (Romania) Elena-Gabriela Ruse
- (Croatia) Tara Würth
- Anastasia Zakharova

The following player received entry as a lucky loser:

- (United Kingdom) Harriet Dart

=== Withdrawals ===
Before the tournament

- (Czech Republic) Marie Bouzková → replaced by (France) Diane Parry
- (Ukraine) Anhelina Kalinina → replaced by (Croatia) Donna Vekić
- Anna Kalinskaya → replaced by (Slovenia) Tamara Zidanšek
- (Czech Republic) Barbora Krejčíková → replaced by (Ukraine) Lesia Tsurenko
- (United States) Bernarda Pera → replaced by (United Kingdom) Harriet Dart
- Liudmila Samsonova → replaced by (Ukraine) Dayana Yastremska
- (Belgium) Alison Van Uytvanck → replaced by (United States) Claire Liu

== Doubles main draw entrants ==
=== Seeds ===
Country	Player	Country	Player	Rank^{1}	Seed
SLO	Andreja Klepač	GER	Laura Siegemund	74	1
	Anastasia Potapova		Yana Sizikova	114	1
GBR	Alicia Barnett	GBR	Olivia Nicholls	141	3
	Ekaterina Alexandrova	GER	Vivian Heisen	151	4

- Rankings are as of August 29, 2022.

=== Other entrants ===
The following pairs received wildcards into the doubles main draw:

- (Hungary) Tímea Babos / (Slovenia) Tamara Zidanšek
- (Slovenia) Pia Lovrič / (Slovenia) Lara Smejkal

The following pair received entry as alternates:

- (Uzbekistan) Nigina Abduraimova / (United Kingdom) Jodie Burrage

=== Withdrawals ===
Before the tournament

- Alena Fomina-Klotz / (Slovenia) Dalila Jakupović → replaced by Alena Fomina-Klotz / (Brazil) Ingrid Gamarra Martins
- Anna Kalinskaya / (Slovakia) Tereza Mihalíková → replaced by (Spain) Cristina Bucșa / (Slovakia) Tereza Mihalíková
- (Slovenia) Andreja Klepač / (Kazakhstan) Elena Rybakina → replaced by (Slovenia) Andreja Klepač / (Germany) Laura Siegemund
- (United States) Nicole Melichar-Martinez / (Germany) Laura Siegemund → replaced by (Hungary) Adrienn Nagy / (Slovenia) Nika Radišić
- (France) Diane Parry / (Denmark) Clara Tauson → replaced by (Uzbekistan) Nigina Abduraimova / (United Kingdom) Jodie Burrage
