= 2022 Zavarovalnica Sava Portorož – Singles =

Singles
- 2022 Zavarovalnica Sava Portorož

Final
- Champion: (Czech Republic) Kateřina Siniaková
- Runner-up: (Kazakhstan) Elena Rybakina
- Score: 6–7^{(4–7)}, 7–6^{(7–5)}, 6–4

Details
- Draw: 32
- Seeds: 8

Events
Singles	Doubles
← 2021 ·	WTA Slovenia Open	· 2023 →

Kateřina Siniaková defeated Elena Rybakina in the final, 6–7^{(4–7)}, 7–6^{(7–5)}, 6–4 to win the singles tennis title at the 2022 WTA Slovenia Open. It was her first singles title since 2017.

Jasmine Paolini was the defending champion, but lost to Siniaková in the quarterfinals.

== Seeds ==
1. (United Kingdom) Emma Raducanu (second round)
2. (Brazil) Beatriz Haddad Maia (quarterfinals)
3. (Kazakhstan) Elena Rybakina (final)
4. (Italy) Martina Trevisan (first round)
5. Ekaterina Alexandrova (second round)
6. (France) Alizé Cornet (first round)
7. (United States) Bernarda Pera (withdrew)
8. (Australia) Ajla Tomljanović (first round)
9. Anastasia Potapova (second round)

== Draw ==
=== Key ===
- Q = Qualifier
- WC = Wild card
- LL = Lucky loser
- Alt = Alternate
- ITF = ITF entry
- PR = Protected ranking
- SR = Special ranking
- SE = Special exempt
- JE = Junior exempt
- JR = Junior Accelerator Programme entrant
- CO = College Accelerator Programme entrant
- NG = Next Gen Accelerator Program entrant
- w/o = Walkover
- r = Retired
- d = Defaulted

=== Finals ===
Semifinals
Q	(Germany) Anna-Lena Friedsam	1	5
(Czech Republic) Kateřina Siniaková	6	7
3	(Kazakhstan) Elena Rybakina	6	6
(Romania) Ana Bogdan	1	1

Final
(Czech Republic) Kateřina Siniaková	6^{4}	7^{7}	6
3	(Kazakhstan) Elena Rybakina	7^{7}	6^{5}	4

=== Top half ===
First round
1/WC	(United Kingdom) E Raducanu	6	5
(Ukraine) D Yastremska	2	3^{r}
WC	(United States) E Mandlik	6	4	1
Q	(Germany) A-L Friedsam	0	6	6
(Croatia) D Vekić	6	4	1
(France) D Parry	2	6	6
(United States) C Liu	4	6^{5}
9	A Potapova	6	7^{7}
4	(Italy) M Trevisan	1	4
(Czech Republic) K Siniaková	6	6
Q	(United Kingdom) J Burrage	6	6
(Serbia) A Krunić	4	4
(Italy) J Paolini	7	6
Q	(Croatia) T Würth	5	1
(Slovenia) K Juvan	7^{7}	6
6	(France) A Cornet	6^{5}	3

Second round
1/WC	(United Kingdom) E Raducanu	5	6	3
Q	(Germany) A-L Friedsam	7	0	6
(France) D Parry	7^{7}	6
9	A Potapova	6^{2}	4
(Czech Republic) K Siniaková	7	6
Q	(United Kingdom) J Burrage	5	1
(Italy) J Paolini	5	6	7^{7}
(Slovenia) K Juvan	7	2	6^{5}

Quarterfinals
Q	(Germany) A-L Friedsam	1	7^{7}	6
(France) D Parry	6	6^{4}	3
(Czech Republic) K Siniaková	6	3	7^{7}
(Italy) J Paolini	2	6	6^{5}

Semifinals
Q	(Germany) A-L Friedsam	1	5
(Czech Republic) K Siniaková	6	7

=== Bottom half ===
First round
5	E Alexandrova	7^{7}	5	7
(Ukraine) M Kostyuk	6^{5}	7	5
(Ukraine) L Tsurenko	6	4	6
Q	(Romania) E-G Ruse	1	6	4
LL	(United Kingdom) H Dart	6	4	1
(Czech Republic) T Martincová	0	6	6
SR	(Germany) L Siegemund	7^{7}	4	6^{8}
3	(Kazakhstan) E Rybakina	6^{4}	6	7^{10}
8	(Australia) A Tomljanović	5	6	1
(Romania) A Bogdan	7	4	6
(Slovenia) T Zidanšek	6	6
Q	A Zakharova	4	4
Q	(Spain) C Bucșa	2	6	6
WC	(Croatia) P Marčinko	6	4	1
(Denmark) C Tauson	6^{3}	3
2	(Brazil) B Haddad Maia	7^{7}	6

Second round
5	E Alexandrova	5	6^{5}
(Ukraine) L Tsurenko	7	7^{7}
(Czech Republic) T Martincová	4	1
3	(Kazakhstan) E Rybakina	6	6
(Romania) A Bogdan	6	6^{5}	6
(Slovenia) T Zidanšek	1	7^{7}	1
Q	(Spain) C Bucșa	1	4
2	(Brazil) B Haddad Maia	6	6

Quarterfinals
(Ukraine) L Tsurenko
3	(Kazakhstan) E Rybakina	w/o
(Romania) A Bogdan	6	1	7
2	(Brazil) B Haddad Maia	1	6	5

Semifinals
3	(Kazakhstan) E Rybakina	6	6
(Romania) A Bogdan	1	1

== Qualifying ==
=== Seeds ===
1. (United Kingdom) Harriet Dart (qualifying competition, lucky loser)
2. (Romania) Elena-Gabriela Ruse (qualified)
3. (Croatia) Ana Konjuh (qualifying competition, retired)
4. (Spain) Cristina Bucșa (qualified)
5. (Germany) Tamara Korpatsch (withdrew)
6. (United Kingdom) Jodie Burrage (qualified)
7. Anastasia Zakharova (qualified)
8. (Uzbekistan) Nigina Abduraimova (first round)
9. (Croatia) Tara Würth (qualified)
10. (Serbia) Natalija Stevanović (first round)
11. (Germany) Anna-Lena Friedsam (qualified)
12. (Switzerland) Stefanie Vögele (qualifying competition)

=== Qualifiers ===
1. (Germany) Anna-Lena Friedsam
2. (Romania) Elena-Gabriela Ruse
3. Anastasia Zakharova
4. (Spain) Cristina Bucșa
5. (Croatia) Tara Würth
6. (United Kingdom) Jodie Burrage

=== Lucky loser ===
1. (United Kingdom) Harriet Dart

=== Qualifying draw ===
==== First qualifier ====
First round
1	(United Kingdom) Harriet Dart	6	6
(Turkey) Pemra Özgen	4	2
WC	(Slovenia) Lara Smejkal	3	1
11	(Germany) Anna-Lena Friedsam	6	6

Qualifying competition
1	(United Kingdom) Harriet Dart	1	6^{7}
11	(Germany) Anna-Lena Friedsam	6	7^{9}

==== Second qualifier ====
First round
2	(Romania) Elena-Gabriela Ruse	6	6
(Germany) Yana Morderger	1	4
WC	(Slovenia) Živa Falkner	3	7^{7}	6
10	(Serbia) Natalija Stevanović	6	6^{1}	4

Qualifying competition
2	(Romania) Elena-Gabriela Ruse	6	6
WC	(Slovenia) Živa Falkner	3	0

==== Third qualifier ====
First round
3	(Croatia) Ana Konjuh	7	6
(Germany) Tayisiya Morderger	5	2
WC	(Slovenia) Noka Jurič	0	0
7	Anastasia Zakharova	6	6

Qualifying competition
3	(Croatia) Ana Konjuh	3^{r}
7	Anastasia Zakharova	5

==== Fourth qualifier ====
First round
4	(Spain) Cristina Bucșa	5	6	6
(Italy) Giulia Gatto-Monticone	7	1	2
(Croatia) Antonia Ružić	7^{7}	6
8	(Uzbekistan) Nigina Abduraimova	6^{4}	1

Qualifying competition
4	(Spain) Cristina Bucșa	6	7
(Croatia) Antonia Ružić	4	5

==== Fifth qualifier ====
First round
Alt	Angelina Gabueva	6	6^{2}	2
(North Macedonia) Lina Gjorcheska	4	7^{7}	6
WC	(Hungary) Tímea Babos	1	7^{7}	3
9	(Croatia) Tara Würth	6	6^{3}	6

Qualifying competition
(North Macedonia) Lina Gjorcheska	6	2	1
9	(Croatia) Tara Würth	2	6	6

==== Sixth qualifier ====
First round
6	(United Kingdom) Jodie Burrage	6	6
(Slovenia) Nika Radišić	4	2
(Georgia (country)) Mariam Bolkvadze	6	4	2
12	(Switzerland) Stefanie Vögele	3	6	6

Qualifying competition
6	(United Kingdom) Jodie Burrage	6	4	7^{7}
12	(Switzerland) Stefanie Vögele	4	6	6^{1}
