= 2022 Silicon Valley Classic =

- Date: 1–7 August
- Edition: 50th
- Category: WTA 500
- Draw: 28S / 16D
- Prize money: $757,900
- Surface: Hard / outdoor
- Location: San Jose, California, United States
- Venue: San José State University Tennis Center

Champions

Singles
- Daria Kasatkina

Doubles
- (China) Xu Yifan / (China) Yang Zhaoxuan
- Silicon Valley Classic

The 2022 Silicon Valley Classic (also known as the Mubadala Silicon Valley Classic for sponsorship reasons) was a professional tennis tournament played on hard courts. It was the 50th and final edition of the tournament, and part of the WTA 500 of the 2022 WTA Tour. It took place between 1 and 7 August 2022 in San Jose, California. It was the first women's event on the 2022 US Open Series.

== Champions ==
=== Singles ===
- Daria Kasatkina def. (United States) Shelby Rogers, 6–7^{(2–7)}, 6–1, 6–2

=== Doubles ===
- (China) Xu Yifan / (China) Yang Zhaoxuan def. (Japan) Shuko Aoyama / (Chinese Taipei) Chan Hao-ching, 7–5, 6–0.

== Points and prize money ==
=== Point distribution ===
Event	W	F	SF	QF	Round of 16	Round of 32	Q	Q2	Q1
Women's singles	470	305	185	100	55	1	25	13	1
Women's doubles	470	305	185	100	1	—N/a	—N/a	—N/a	—N/a

== Singles main draw entrants ==
=== Seeds ===
Country	Player	Rank^{†}	Seed
GRE	Maria Sakkari	3	1
ESP	Paula Badosa	4	2
TUN	Ons Jabeur	5	3
	Aryna Sabalenka	6	4
~~ESP~~	~~Garbiñe Muguruza~~	~~8~~	~~5~~
USA	Coco Gauff	11	6
	Daria Kasatkina	12	7
CZE	Karolína Plíšková	15	8
	Veronika Kudermetova	19	9

^{†} Rankings are as of 25 July 2022.

=== Other entrants ===
The following players received wildcard entry into the singles main draw:

- (United Kingdom) Katie Boulter
- (United States) Ashlyn Krueger

The following players received entry from the qualifying draw:

- (United States) Kayla Day
- (United States) Elizabeth Mandlik
- (Australia) Storm Sanders
- (United States) Taylor Townsend

The following player received entry as a lucky loser:

- (United States) Caroline Dolehide

=== Withdrawals ===
Before the tournament

- Ekaterina Alexandrova → replaced by (China) Zhang Shuai
- (United States) Danielle Collins → replaced by (Japan) Naomi Osaka
- (France) Alizé Cornet → replaced by (China) Zheng Qinwen
- (Spain) Garbiñe Muguruza → replaced by (United States) Caroline Dolehide

== Doubles main draw entrants ==
=== Seeds ===
Country	Player	Country	Player	Rank^{†}	Seed
	Veronika Kudermetova	CHN	Zhang Shuai	7	1
CAN	Gabriela Dabrowski	MEX	Giuliana Olmos	17	2
USA	Desirae Krawczyk	NED	Demi Schuurs	28	3
CHN	Xu Yifan	CHN	Yang Zhaoxuan	46	4

^{†} Rankings are as of 25 July 2022.

=== Other entrants ===
The following pairs received wildcard entry into the doubles main draw :

- (Chinese Taipei) Latisha Chan / (Brazil) Beatriz Haddad Maia
- (United States) Ashlyn Krueger / (United States) Elizabeth Mandlik
