= 2022 Silicon Valley Classic – Singles =

Singles
- 2022 Silicon Valley Classic

Final
- Champion: Daria Kasatkina
- Runner-up: (United States) Shelby Rogers
- Score: 6–7^{(2–7)}, 6–1, 6–2

Details
- Draw: 28
- Seeds: 8

Events
Singles	Doubles
← 2021 ·	Silicon Valley Classic

Daria Kasatkina defeated Shelby Rogers in the final, 6–7^{(2–7)}, 6–1, 6–2 to win the singles tennis title at the 2022 Silicon Valley Classic. With the win, Kasatkina re-entered the world's Top 10 in rankings for the first time since 2019, reaching a new career high of No. 9.

Danielle Collins was the reigning champion, but withdrew before the tournament.

== Seeds ==
The top four seeds received a bye into the second round.

1. (Greece) Maria Sakkari (second round)
2. (Spain) Paula Badosa (semifinals)
3. (Tunisia) Ons Jabeur (quarterfinals)
4. Aryna Sabalenka (quarterfinals)
5. (Spain) Garbiñe Muguruza (withdrew)
6. (United States) Coco Gauff (quarterfinals)
7. Daria Kasatkina (champion)
8. (Czech Republic) Karolína Plíšková (second round)
9. Veronika Kudermetova (semifinals)

== Draw ==
=== Key ===
- Q = Qualifier
- WC = Wild card
- LL = Lucky loser
- Alt = Alternate
- SE = Special exempt
- PR = Protected ranking
- ITF = ITF entry
- JE = Junior exempt
- w/o = Walkover
- r = Retired
- d = Defaulted
- SR = Special ranking

=== Finals ===
Semifinals
(United States) Shelby Rogers	6	6
9	Veronika Kudermetova	3	4
7	Daria Kasatkina	6	6
2	(Spain) Paula Badosa	2	4

Final
(United States) Shelby Rogers	7^{7}	1	2
7	Daria Kasatkina	6^{2}	6	6

=== Top half ===
First round
(United States) S Rogers	6	6
(Canada) B Andreescu	4	2
WC	(United States) A Krueger	2	6^{5}
(United States) A Anisimova	6	7^{7}
WC	(United Kingdom) K Boulter	6	6^{5}	3
8	(Czech Republic) Ka Plíšková	1	7^{7}	6
(China) S Zhang	4	2
(United States) M Keys	6	6
(Brazil) B Haddad Maia	2	5
(United States) C Liu	6	7
(Italy) C Giorgi	6^{2}	6	5
9	V Kudermetova	7^{7}	4	7

Second round
1	(Greece) M Sakkari	1	3
(United States) S Rogers	6	6
(United States) A Anisimova	3	7	6
8	(Czech Republic) Ka Plíšková	6	5	1
3	(Tunisia) O Jabeur	7	6
(United States) M Keys	5	1
(United States) C Liu	2	5
9	V Kudermetova	6	7

Quarterfinals
(United States) S Rogers	6	6
(United States) A Anisimova	4	4
3	(Tunisia) O Jabeur	6^{5}	2
9	V Kudermetova	7^{7}	6

Semifinals
(United States) S Rogers	6	6
9	V Kudermetova	3	4

=== Bottom half ===
First round
7	D Kasatkina	1	6	6
(Kazakhstan) E Rybakina	6	2	0
Q	(United States) T Townsend	6	6
Q	(Australia) S Sanders	1	4
Q	(United States) K Day	6^{5}	4
LL	(United States) C Dolehide	7^{7}	6
6	(United States) C Gauff	6	6
(Ukraine) A Kalinina	1	0
(Japan) N Osaka	6	3	6
(China) Q Zheng	4	6	1
Q	(United States) E Mandlik	6	6
(United States) A Riske-Amritraj	3	3

Second round
7	D Kasatkina	6	6
Q	(United States) T Townsend	4	0
LL	(United States) C Dolehide	7	1	5
4	A Sabalenka	5	6	7
6	(United States) C Gauff	6	6
(Japan) N Osaka	4	4
Q	(United States) E Mandlik	2	7	6^{5}
2	(Spain) P Badosa	6	5	7^{7}

Quarterfinals
7	D Kasatkina	4	7	6
4	A Sabalenka	6	5	0
6	(United States) C Gauff	6^{4}	2
2	(Spain) P Badosa	7^{7}	6

Semifinals
7	D Kasatkina	6	6
2	(Spain) P Badosa	2	4

== Qualifying ==
=== Seeds ===
1. (Switzerland) Jil Teichmann (qualifying competition)
2. Kamilla Rakhimova (first round)
3. (United States) Katie Volynets (first round)
4. (United States) Alycia Parks (first round)
5. (United States) Caroline Dolehide (qualifying competition, lucky loser)
6. (United States) Asia Muhammad (first round)
7. (Canada) Carol Zhao (first round)
8. (Mexico) Fernanda Contreras Gómez (first round)

=== Qualifiers ===
1. (United States) Elizabeth Mandlik
2. (United States) Taylor Townsend
3. (United States) Kayla Day
4. (Australia) Storm Sanders

=== Lucky losers ===
1. (United States) Caroline Dolehide

=== Qualifying draw ===
==== First qualifier ====
First round
1	(Switzerland) Jil Teichmann	6	7
(Colombia) Emiliana Arango	1	5
(United States) Elizabeth Mandlik	6	2	6
8	(Mexico) Fernanda Contreras Gómez	3	6	3

Qualifying competition
1	(Switzerland) Jil Teichmann	6	3	0
(United States) Elizabeth Mandlik	3	6	6

==== Second qualifier ====
First round
2	Kamilla Rakhimova	2	2
(United States) Emina Bektas	6	6
PR	(United States) Taylor Townsend	6^{5}	6	6
6	(United States) Asia Muhammad	7^{7}	3	4

Qualifying competition
(United States) Emina Bektas	3	2
PR	(United States) Taylor Townsend	6	6

==== Third qualifier ====
First round
3	(United States) Katie Volynets	6	2	2
(United States) Grace Min	1	6	6
(United States) Kayla Day	6	3	7^{8}
7	(Canada) Carol Zhao	4	6	6^{6}

Qualifying competition
(United States) Grace Min	2	6	4
(United States) Kayla Day	6	1	6

==== Fourth qualifier ====
First round
4	(United States) Alycia Parks	2	0
(Australia) Storm Sanders	6	6
(United States) Francesca Di Lorenzo	3	4
5	(United States) Caroline Dolehide	6	6

Qualifying competition
(Australia) Storm Sanders	6	6
5	(United States) Caroline Dolehide	4	1
