= 2022 Qatar Total Open – Singles =

Singles
- 2022 Qatar Total Open

Final
- Champion: (Poland) Iga Świątek
- Runner-up: (Estonia) Anett Kontaveit
- Score: 6–2, 6–0

Details
- Draw: 56
- Seeds: 16

Events
Singles	Doubles
← 2021 ·	Qatar Total Open	· 2023 →

Iga Świątek defeated Anett Kontaveit in the final, 6–2, 6–0 to win the singles title at the 2022 WTA Qatar Open. This tournament marked the beginning of an eventual 37-match and six-title winning streak by Świątek.

Petra Kvitová was the defending champion, but she retired from her second round match against Elise Mertens.

== Seeds ==
The top eight seeds received a bye into the second round.

1. (Belarus) Aryna Sabalenka (quarterfinals)
2. (Czech Republic) Barbora Krejčíková (third round)
3. (Spain) Paula Badosa (third round)
4. (Estonia) Anett Kontaveit (final)
5. (Spain) Garbiñe Muguruza (quarterfinals)
6. (Greece) Maria Sakkari (semifinals)
7. (Poland) Iga Świątek (champion)
8. (Tunisia) Ons Jabeur (quarterfinals)

9. (United States) Jessica Pegula (third round)
10. (Ukraine) Elina Svitolina (first round)
11. (Kazakhstan) Elena Rybakina (first round)
12. (Belarus) Victoria Azarenka (second round, withdrew)
13. (Germany) Angelique Kerber (first round)
14. (United States) Coco Gauff (quarterfinals)
15. (Latvia) Jeļena Ostapenko (semifinals)
16. (Belgium) Elise Mertens (third round)

== Draw ==
=== Key ===
- Q = Qualifier
- WC = Wild card
- LL = Lucky loser
- Alt = Alternate
- SE = Special exempt
- PR = Protected ranking
- ITF = ITF entry
- JE = Junior exempt
- w/o = Walkover
- r = Retired
- d = Defaulted
- SR = Special ranking

=== Finals ===
Quarterfinals
1	(Belarus) Aryna Sabalenka	2	3
7	(Poland) Iga Świątek	6	6
14	(United States) Coco Gauff	3	3
6	(Greece) Maria Sakkari	6	6
8	(Tunisia) Ons Jabeur	4	1
4	(Estonia) Anett Kontaveit	6	6
5	(Spain) Garbiñe Muguruza	2	2
15	(Latvia) Jeļena Ostapenko	6	6

Semifinals
7	(Poland) Iga Świątek	6	6
6	(Greece) Maria Sakkari	4	3
4	(Estonia) Anett Kontaveit	6	6
15	(Latvia) Jeļena Ostapenko	1	4

Final
7	(Poland) Iga Świątek	6	6
4	(Estonia) Anett Kontaveit	2	0

=== Top half ===
==== Section 1 ====
First round
(Russia) L Samsonova	6	4	5
WC	(France) A Cornet	3	6	7
WC	(Russia) V Zvonareva	4	4
(Belgium) A Van Uytvanck	6	6
(Switzerland) J Teichmann	4	6	6
13	(Germany) A Kerber	6	3	2
11	(Kazakhstan) E Rybakina	4	3
LL	(Romania) J Cristian	6	6
(Russia) D Kasatkina	6	6^{4}	6
(Australia) A Tomljanović	4	7^{7}	2
(Switzerland) V Golubic	6	6
Q	(Germany) A Petkovic	4	4

Second round
1	(Belarus) A Sabalenka	6	6
WC	(France) A Cornet	2	2
(Belgium) A Van Uytvanck	6^{9}	5
(Switzerland) J Teichmann	7^{11}	7
LL	(Romania) J Cristian	6	2^{r}
(Russia) D Kasatkina	2	2
(Switzerland) V Golubic	2	6	2
7	(Poland) I Świątek	6	3	6

Third round
1	(Belarus) A Sabalenka	6	6
(Switzerland) J Teichmann	2	1
(Russia) D Kasatkina	3	0
7	(Poland) I Świątek	6	6

Quarterfinals
1	(Belarus) A Sabalenka	2	3
7	(Poland) I Świątek	6	6

==== Section 2 ====
First round
(Switzerland) B Bencic	4	6	3
(Denmark) C Tauson	6	3	6
(Romania) S Halep	4	3
WC	(France) C Garcia	6	6
(United States) S Rogers	2	3
14	(United States) C Gauff	6	6
9	(United States) J Pegula	6	6
(Czech Republic) K Siniaková	3	2
Q	(Switzerland) S Vögele	4	2
Q	(Slovenia) K Juvan	6	6
(United States) S Kenin	3	7^{7}	3
(United States) A Li	6	6^{5}	6

Second round
3	(Spain) P Badosa	6	6
(Denmark) C Tauson	1	2
WC	(France) C Garcia	2	6^{3}
14	(United States) C Gauff	6	7^{7}
9	(United States) J Pegula	6	6
Q	(Slovenia) K Juvan	3	3
(United States) A Li	3	3
6	(Greece) M Sakkari	6	6

Third round
3	(Spain) P Badosa	2	3
14	(United States) C Gauff	6	6
9	(United States) J Pegula	4	5
6	(Greece) M Sakkari	6	7

Quarterfinals
14	(United States) C Gauff	3	3
6	(Greece) M Sakkari	6	6

=== Bottom half ===
==== Section 3 ====
First round
Q	(China) S Zhang	1	1
Q	(Belarus) A Sasnovich	6	6
LL	(Netherlands) A Rus	7^{7}	6
(Russia) V Kudermetova	6^{5}	4
(Czech Republic) T Martincová	6^{2}	7	7^{7}
10	(Ukraine) E Svitolina	7^{7}	5	6^{5}
16	(Belgium) E Mertens	6	2	7
(Italy) J Paolini	3	6	5
(Czech Republic) P Kvitová	6	6
(Romania) I-C Begu	3	1
Q	(Ukraine) M Kostyuk	6	5	3
(Croatia) A Konjuh	4	7	6

Second round
8	(Tunisia) O Jabeur	1	7	6
Q	(Belarus) A Sasnovich	6	5	3
LL	(Netherlands) A Rus	2	4
(Czech Republic) T Martincová	6	6
16	(Belgium) E Mertens	7	1
(Czech Republic) P Kvitová	5	2^{r}
(Croatia) A Konjuh	2	3
4	(Estonia) A Kontaveit	6	6

Third round
8	(Tunisia) O Jabeur	6	3	6
(Czech Republic) T Martincová	1	6	3
16	(Belgium) E Mertens	3	6	2
4	(Estonia) A Kontaveit	6	0	6

Quarterfinals
8	(Tunisia) O Jabeur	4	1
4	(Estonia) A Kontaveit	6	6

==== Section 4 ====
First round
(Romania) S Cîrstea	6	6
WC	(Egypt) M Sherif	2	1
(United States) M Brengle	7	6
WC	(Turkey) İ Öz	5	3
(Kazakhstan) Y Putintseva	7	2	5
12	(Belarus) V Azarenka	5	6	7
15	(Latvia) J Ostapenko	6	6
Q	(France) O Dodin	4	2
(United States) A Anisimova	7	6
Q	(Brazil) B Haddad Maia	5	4
(United States) A Riske	6	6^{5}	1
(Poland) M Linette	2	7^{7}	6

Second round
5	(Spain) G Muguruza	7^{7}	6
(Romania) S Cîrstea	6^{4}	1
(United States) M Brengle	w/o
12	(Belarus) V Azarenka
15	(Latvia) J Ostapenko	6	4	6
(United States) A Anisimova	3	6	4
(Poland) M Linette	1	3
2	(Czech Republic) B Krejčíková	6	6

Third round
5	(Spain) G Muguruza	6	6
(United States) M Brengle	0	2
15	(Latvia) J Ostapenko	6	6
2	(Czech Republic) B Krejčíková	3	2

Quarterfinals
5	(Spain) G Muguruza	2	2
15	(Latvia) J Ostapenko	6	6

== Qualifying ==
=== Seeds ===
1. (Ukraine) Marta Kostyuk (qualified)
2. (Germany) Andrea Petkovic (qualified)
3. (Belarus) Aliaksandra Sasnovich (qualified)
4. (China) Zhang Shuai (qualified)
5. (Romania) Jaqueline Cristian (qualifying competition, lucky loser)
6. (Netherlands) Arantxa Rus (qualifying competition, lucky loser)
7. (Belgium) Maryna Zanevska (qualifying competition)
8. (Brazil) Beatriz Haddad Maia (qualified)
9. (Slovakia) Kristína Kučová (qualifying competition)
10. (Hungary) Anna Bondár (qualifying competition)
11. (United Kingdom) Heather Watson (first round)
12. (Australia) Astra Sharma (first round)
13. (Italy) Martina Trevisan (first round)
14. (Slovenia) Kaja Juvan (qualified)
15. (United States) Claire Liu (qualifying competition)
16. (France) Océane Dodin (qualified)

=== Qualifiers ===
1. (Ukraine) Marta Kostyuk
2. (Germany) Andrea Petkovic
3. (Belarus) Aliaksandra Sasnovich
4. (China) Zhang Shuai
5. (France) Océane Dodin
6. (Switzerland) Stefanie Vögele
7. (Slovenia) Kaja Juvan
8. (Brazil) Beatriz Haddad Maia

=== Lucky losers ===
1. (Romania) Jaqueline Cristian
2. (Netherlands) Arantxa Rus

=== Qualifying draw ===
==== First qualifier ====
First round
1	(Ukraine) Marta Kostyuk	6	6
WC	(Qatar) Mubaraka Al-Naimi	1	2
(Russia) Anastasia Gasanova	4	1
15	(United States) Claire Liu	6	6

Qualifying competition
1	(Ukraine) Marta Kostyuk	7	6
15	(United States) Claire Liu	5	4

==== Second qualifier ====
First round
2	(Germany) Andrea Petkovic	2	6	6
(Australia) Ellen Perez	6	2	0
(Sweden) Mirjam Björklund	2	4
10	(Hungary) Anna Bondár	6	6

Qualifying competition
2	(Germany) Andrea Petkovic	6	6
10	(Hungary) Anna Bondár	0	2

==== Third qualifier ====
First round
3	(Belarus) Aliaksandra Sasnovich	6	6
(Romania) Ana Bogdan	1	1
PR	(Belgium) Kirsten Flipkens	5	6	6
12	(Australia) Astra Sharma	7	1	3

Qualifying competition
3	(Belarus) Aliaksandra Sasnovich	6	6
PR	(Belgium) Kirsten Flipkens	3	2

==== Fourth qualifier ====
First round
4	(China) Zhang Shuai	6	6
(France) Diane Parry	1	0
(Russia) Marina Melnikova	7	6
11	(United Kingdom) Heather Watson	5	1

Qualifying competition
4	(China) Zhang Shuai	6	6
(Russia) Marina Melnikova	0	3

==== Fifth qualifier ====
First round
5	(Romania) Jaqueline Cristian	6	6
Alt	(Norway) Ulrikke Eikeri	1	2
(United Kingdom) Harriet Dart	5	4
16	(France) Océane Dodin	7	6

Qualifying competition
5	(Romania) Jaqueline Cristian	2	6^{4}
16	(France) Océane Dodin	6	7^{7}

==== Sixth qualifier ====
First round
6	(Netherlands) Arantxa Rus	6	6
(Romania) Irina Bara	3	0
(Switzerland) Stefanie Vögele	6	6
13	(Italy) Martina Trevisan	4	4

Qualifying competition
6	(Netherlands) Arantxa Rus	2	6	1
(Switzerland) Stefanie Vögele	6	2	6

==== Seventh qualifier ====
First round
7	(Belgium) Maryna Zanevska	6	3
(United States) Bernarda Pera	3	0^{r}
WC	(Kazakhstan) Anna Danilina	2	2
14	(Slovenia) Kaja Juvan	6	6

Qualifying competition
7	(Belgium) Maryna Zanevska	6	1	5
14	(Slovenia) Kaja Juvan	2	6	7

==== Eighth qualifier ====
First round
8	(Brazil) Beatriz Haddad Maia	6	6
(Russia) Kamilla Rakhimova	1	3
(Australia) Maddison Inglis	0	2
9	(Slovakia) Kristína Kučová	6	6

Qualifying competition
8	(Brazil) Beatriz Haddad Maia	4	6	6
9	(Slovakia) Kristína Kučová	6	1	2
