= 2022 BNP Paribas Open – Women's singles =

Tennis tournament event

Women's singles
- 2022 BNP Paribas Open

Final
- Champion: (Poland) Iga Świątek
- Runner-up: (Greece) Maria Sakkari
- Score: 6–4, 6–1

Details
- Draw: 96 (12 Q / 8 WC )
- Seeds: 32

Events
Singles	men	women
Doubles	men	women
← 2021 ·	Indian Wells Open	· 2023 →

Iga Świątek defeated Maria Sakkari in the final, 6–4, 6–1 to win the women's singles tennis title at the 2022 Indian Wells Masters. She was the first Pole to win the title.

Paula Badosa was the defending champion, but lost to Sakkari in the semifinals.

The international governing bodies of tennis (WTA, ATP, ITF, Australian Open, French Open, Wimbledon, US Open) allowed players from Russia and Belarus to continue to participate in tennis events on tour and at the majors, but not under the name or flag of Russia or Belarus until further notice, due to the 2022 Russian invasion of Ukraine.

== Seeds ==
All seeds received a bye into the second round.

1. (Czech Republic) Barbora Krejčíková (withdrew due to elbow injury)
2. Aryna Sabalenka (second round)
3. (Poland) Iga Świątek (champion)
4. (Estonia) Anett Kontaveit (third round)
5. (Spain) Paula Badosa (semifinals)
6. (Greece) Maria Sakkari (final)
7. (Czech Republic) Karolína Plíšková (second round)
8. (Spain) Garbiñe Muguruza (second round)
9. (Tunisia) Ons Jabeur (second round)
10. (Latvia) Jeļena Ostapenko (second round)
11. (United Kingdom) Emma Raducanu (third round)
12. (Ukraine) Elina Svitolina (second round)
13. Victoria Azarenka (third round)
14. (United States) Jessica Pegula (second round)
15. (Germany) Angelique Kerber (fourth round)
16. (United States) Coco Gauff (third round)
17. (Kazakhstan) Elena Rybakina (quarterfinals)

18. (Canada) Leylah Fernandez (fourth round)
19. (Slovenia) Tamara Zidanšek (second round)
20. (Belgium) Elise Mertens (third round)
21. Veronika Kudermetova (quarterfinals)
22. (Switzerland) Belinda Bencic (second round)
23. Daria Kasatkina (third round)
24. (Romania) Simona Halep (semifinals)
25. (United States) Madison Keys (quarterfinals)
26. (Romania) Sorana Cîrstea (fourth round)
27. (Czech Republic) Petra Kvitová (third round)
28. Liudmila Samsonova (fourth round)
29. (Denmark) Clara Tauson (third round)
30. (Czech Republic) Markéta Vondroušová (fourth round)
31. (Switzerland) Viktorija Golubic (fourth round)
32. (Spain) Sara Sorribes Tormo (third round)
33. (France) Alizé Cornet (second round)

Click on the seed number of a player to go to their draw section.

== Draw ==
=== Key ===
- Q = Qualifier
- WC = Wild card
- LL = Lucky loser
- Alt = Alternate
- SE = Special exempt
- PR = Protected ranking
- ITF = ITF entry
- JE = Junior exempt
- w/o = Walkover
- r = Retired
- d = Defaulted
- SR = Special ranking

=== Finals ===
Quarterfinals
24	(Romania) Simona Halep	6	6
(Croatia) Petra Martić	1	1
3	(Poland) Iga Świątek	6	6
25	(United States) Madison Keys	1	0
5	(Spain) Paula Badosa	6	6
21	Veronika Kudermetova	3	2
6	(Greece) Maria Sakkari	7	6
17	(Kazakhstan) Elena Rybakina	5	4

Semifinals
24	(Romania) Simona Halep	6^{6}	4
3	(Poland) Iga Świątek	7^{8}	6
5	(Spain) Paula Badosa	2	6	1
6	(Greece) Maria Sakkari	6	4	6

Final
3	(Poland) Iga Świątek	6	6
6	(Greece) Maria Sakkari	4	1

=== Top half ===
==== Section 1 ====
First round
Q	(France) H Tan	2	0^{r}
LL	A Kalinskaya	6	1
(Australia) A Tomljanović	6	2	6
WC	(United States) H Baptiste	2	6	2
E Alexandrova	4	6	7^{9}
WC	(United States) E Kalieva	6	2	6^{7}
WC	(United States) C Liu	7^{7}	6
Q	(Bulgaria) V Tomova	6^{2}	4

Second round
33	(France) A Cornet	4	6	2
LL	A Kalinskaya	6	0	6
(Australia) A Tomljanović	4	5
26	(Romania) S Cîrstea	6	7
24	(Romania) S Halep	6	4	6
E Alexandrova	2	6	2
WC	(United States) C Liu	1	6^{4}
16	(United States) C Gauff	6	7^{7}

Third round
LL	A Kalinskaya	7	1	0
26	(Romania) S Cîrstea	5	6	6
24	(Romania) S Halep	6	6
16	(United States) C Gauff	3	4

Fourth round
26	(Romania) S Cîrstea	1	4
24	(Romania) S Halep	6	6

==== Section 2 ====
First round
WC	(Ukraine) D Yastremska	4	7^{10}	5
(France) C Garcia	6	6^{8}	7
(Hungary) A Bondár	5	3
(Croatia) P Martić	7	6
(United States) A Li	1	7^{7}	6
(United States) M Brengle	6	6^{5}	0
(Montenegro) D Kovinić	7	7
(Switzerland) J Teichmann	5	5

Second round
11	(United Kingdom) E Raducanu	6	3	6
(France) C Garcia	1	6	1
(Croatia) P Martić	7	7^{8}
19	(Slovenia) T Zidanšek	5	6^{6}
28	L Samsonova	4	6	6
(United States) A Li	6	4	3
(Montenegro) D Kovinić	2	7	6
7	(Czech Republic) Ka Plíšková	6	5	4

Third round
11	(United Kingdom) E Raducanu	7^{7}	4	5
(Croatia) P Martić	6^{3}	6	7
28	L Samsonova	6	7^{7}
(Montenegro) D Kovinić	4	6^{4}

Fourth round
(Croatia) P Martić	7^{8}	6
28	L Samsonova	6^{6}	4

==== Section 3 ====
First round
(France) C Burel	3	2
(Ukraine) A Kalinina	6	6
(Brazil) B Haddad Maia	6	7
WC	(United States) S Kenin	3	5
WC	(United States) K Volynets	4	6	6
(Netherlands) A Rus	6	4	1
(China) Q Zheng	6	6
V Zvonareva	3	2

Second round
3	(Poland) I Świątek	5	6	6
(Ukraine) A Kalinina	7	0	1
(Brazil) B Haddad Maia	4	3
29	(Denmark) C Tauson	6	6
23	D Kasatkina	6	4	7
WC	(United States) K Volynets	4	6	5
(China) Q Zheng	2	7	4
15	(Germany) A Kerber	6	5	6

Third round
3	(Poland) I Świątek	6^{3}	6	6
29	(Denmark) C Tauson	7^{7}	2	1
23	D Kasatkina	2	1
15	(Germany) A Kerber	6	6

Fourth round
3	(Poland) I Świątek	4	6	6
15	(Germany) A Kerber	6	2	3

==== Section 4 ====
First round
(Croatia) A Konjuh	1	1^{r}
Q	(United Kingdom) H Dart	6	3
WC	(United States) R Montgomery	3	3
(Estonia) K Kanepi	6	6
A Potapova	6	4	3
(Japan) M Doi	0	6	6
(United States) A Riske	6	6
Q	(United States) C McNally	0	3

Second round
12	(Ukraine) E Svitolina	6	3	3
Q	(United Kingdom) H Dart	2	6	6
(Estonia) K Kanepi	6	6
22	(Switzerland) B Bencic	4	3
25	(United States) M Keys	6	3	6
(Japan) M Doi	4	6	1
(United States) A Riske	0	6	6
8	(Spain) G Muguruza	6	3	1

Third round
Q	(United Kingdom) H Dart	7^{7}	6
(Estonia) K Kanepi	6^{4}	3
25	(United States) M Keys	7^{7}	6
(United States) A Riske	6^{4}	1

Fourth round
Q	(United Kingdom) H Dart	1	4
25	(United States) M Keys	6	6

=== Bottom half ===
==== Section 5 ====
First round
Q	(United Kingdom) H Watson	2	1
(Czech Republic) T Martincová	6	6
(France) O Dodin	3	3
Q	(Slovenia) K Juvan	6	6
(United States) A Anisimova	6	6
WC	(United States) E Navarro	2	2
(Spain) N Párrizas Díaz	1	7	6^{3}
(United States) S Rogers	6	5	7^{7}

Second round
5	(Spain) P Badosa	6	7^{7}
(Czech Republic) T Martincová	2	6^{4}
Q	(Slovenia) K Juvan	6	5	3
32	(Spain) S Sorribes Tormo	3	7	6
18	(Canada) L Fernandez	2	7^{7}	0
(United States) A Anisimova	6	6^{0}	0^{r}
(United States) S Rogers	7	7^{9}
10	(Latvia) J Ostapenko	5	6^{7}

Third round
5	(Spain) P Badosa	7^{7}	6
32	(Spain) S Sorribes Tormo	6^{4}	1
18	(Canada) L Fernandez	6	3	6
(United States) S Rogers	1	6	3

Fourth round
5	(Spain) P Badosa	6	6
18	(Canada) L Fernandez	4	4

==== Section 6 ====
First round
Q	(China) Q Wang	3	6^{5}
Q	(Czech Republic) M Bouzková	6	7^{7}
(United States) S Stephens	6	1	2
(Japan) N Osaka	3	6	6
LL	(Poland) M Fręch	6	7
(Egypt) M Sherif	2	5
(Slovakia) K Kučová	4	6	6
(Romania) E-G Ruse	6	4	1

Second round
14	(United States) J Pegula	7	2	0
Q	(Czech Republic) M Bouzková	5	6	6
(Japan) N Osaka	0	4
21	V Kudermetova	6	6
30	(Czech Republic) M Vondroušová	6	6
LL	(Poland) M Fręch	1	3
(Slovakia) K Kučová	4	1
4	(Estonia) A Kontaveit	6	6

Third round
Q	(Czech Republic) M Bouzková	4	2^{r}
21	V Kudermetova	6	0
30	(Czech Republic) M Vondroušová	3	7	7^{7}
4	(Estonia) A Kontaveit	6	5	6^{5}

Fourth round
21	V Kudermetova	7^{7}	6^{5}	7
30	(Czech Republic) M Vondroušová	6^{5}	7^{7}	5

==== Section 7 ====
First round
(Czech Republic) K Siniaková	6	4	6
(Romania) I-C Begu	2	6	4
(Colombia) C Osorio	4	0^{r}
A Sasnovich	6	5
(Ukraine) M Kostyuk	6^{5}	7^{8}	7
(Belgium) M Zanevska	7^{7}	6^{6}	5
Q	(Australia) D Saville	6	6
(China) S Zhang	3	2

Second round
6	(Greece) M Sakkari	6	7
(Czech Republic) K Siniaková	3	5
A Sasnovich	7^{7}	4	4
27	(Czech Republic) P Kvitová	6^{4}	6	6
20	(Belgium) E Mertens	6	6
(Ukraine) M Kostyuk	2	1
Q	(Australia) D Saville	7	6^{0}	6
9	(Tunisia) O Jabeur	5	7^{7}	4

Third round
6	(Greece) M Sakkari	6	6
27	(Czech Republic) P Kvitová	3	0
20	(Belgium) E Mertens	3	6	3
Q	(Australia) D Saville	6	4	6

Fourth round
6	(Greece) M Sakkari	4
Q	(Australia) D Saville	1^{r}

==== Section 8 ====
First round
(Poland) M Linette	4	6^{1}
LL	(Australia) A Sharma	6	7^{7}
(Belgium) A Van Uytvanck	7^{7}	6
Q	(Hungary) D Gálfi	6^{3}	4
Q	(United States) A Krueger	3	2
(Kazakhstan) Y Putintseva	6	6
Q	(United Kingdom) K Boulter	3	2
(Italy) J Paolini	6	6

Second round
13	V Azarenka	6	7
LL	(Australia) A Sharma	3	5
(Belgium) A Van Uytvanck	1	5
17	(Kazakhstan) E Rybakina	6	7
31	(Switzerland) V Golubic	6	2	6
(Kazakhstan) Y Putintseva	3	6	4
(Italy) J Paolini	2	6	6
2	A Sabalenka	6	3	3

Third round
13	V Azarenka	3	4
17	(Kazakhstan) E Rybakina	6	6
31	(Switzerland) V Golubic	7	1	7^{7}
(Italy) J Paolini	5	6	6^{4}

Fourth round
17	(Kazakhstan) E Rybakina	7^{7}	6
31	(Switzerland) V Golubic	6^{5}	2

== Seeded players ==
The following are the seeded players. Seedings are based on WTA rankings as of February 28, 2022. Rankings and points before are as of March 7, 2022.

Like the men's event, points from the 2021 tournament will not drop until October 17, 2022 because it was held in October 2021. Instead of defending points from the 2021 tournament, each player's 16th best result will be replaced by their points from the 2022 tournament.

Seed	Rank	Player	Points before	16th best result	2022 points	Points after	Status
~~1~~	~~2~~	~~(Czech Republic) Barbora Krejčíková~~	5,073	40	0	5,033	Withdrew due to elbow injury
2	3	Aryna Sabalenka	4,853	1	10	4,862	Second round lost to (Italy) Jasmine Paolini
3	4	(Poland) Iga Świątek	4,776	0	1,000	5,776	Champion, defeated (Greece) Maria Sakkari [6]
4	5	(Estonia) Anett Kontaveit	4,721	100	65	4,686	Third round lost to (Czech Republic) Markéta Vondroušová [30]
5	7	(Spain) Paula Badosa	4,424	24	390	4,790	Semifinal lost to (Greece) Maria Sakkari [6]
6	6	(Greece) Maria Sakkari	4,436	1	650	5,085	Runner-up, lost to (Poland) Iga Świątek [4]
7	8	(Czech Republic) Karolína Plíšková	4,242	0	10	4,252	Second round lost to (Montenegro) Danka Kovinić
8	9	(Spain) Garbiñe Muguruza	3,235	55	10	3,190	Second round lost to (United States) Alison Riske
9	10	(Tunisia) Ons Jabeur	3,065	100	10	2,975	Second round lost to (Australia) Daria Saville [Q]
10	12	(Latvia) Jeļena Ostapenko	2,880	30	10	2,860	Second round lost to (United States) Shelby Rogers
11	13	(United Kingdom) Emma Raducanu	2,635	1	65	2,699	Third round lost to (Croatia) Petra Martić
12	18	(Ukraine) Elina Svitolina	2,207	1	10	2,216	Second round lost to (United Kingdom) Harriet Dart [Q]
13	15	Victoria Azarenka	2,271	0	65	2,336	Third round lost to (Kazakhstan) Elena Rybakina [17]
14	19	(United States) Jessica Pegula	2,206	1	10	2,215	Second round lost to (Czech Republic) Marie Bouzková [Q]
15	16	(Germany) Angelique Kerber	2,232	0	120	2,352	Fourth round lost to (Poland) Iga Świątek [3]
16	17	(United States) Cori Gauff	2,231	16	65	2,280	Third round lost to (Romania) Simona Halep [24]
17	20	(Kazakhstan) Elena Rybakina	2,101	55	215	2,261	Quarterfinal lost to (Greece) Maria Sakkari [6]
18	21	(Canada) Leylah Fernandez	2,066	15	120	2,171	Fourth round lost to (Spain) Paula Badosa [5]
19	22	(Slovenia) Tamara Zidanšek	1,936	15	10	1,931	Second round lost to (Croatia) Petra Martić
20	23	(Belgium) Elise Mertens	1,886	1	65	1,950	Third round lost to (Australia) Daria Saville [Q]
21	24	Veronika Kudermetova	1,875	55	215	2,035	Quarterfinal lost to (Spain) Paula Badosa [5]
22	25	(Switzerland) Belinda Bencic	1,871	55	10	1,826	Second round lost to (Estonia) Kaia Kanepi
23	28	Daria Kasatkina	1,755	30	65	1,790	Third round lost to (Germany) Angelique Kerber [15]
24	26	(Romania) Simona Halep	1,832	1	390	2,221	Semifinal lost to (Poland) Iga Świątek [3]
25	29	(United States) Madison Keys	1,690	1	215	1,904	Quarterfinal lost to (Poland) Iga Świątek [3]
26	27	(Romania) Sorana Cîrstea	1,775	30	120	1,865	Fourth round lost to (Romania) Simona Halep [24]
27	31	(Czech Republic) Petra Kvitová	1,585	55	65	1,595	Third round lost to (Greece) Maria Sakkari [6]
28	32	Liudmila Samsonova	1,527	15	120	1,632	Fourth round lost to (Croatia) Petra Martić
29	40	(Denmark) Clara Tauson	1,229	15	65	1,279	Third round lost to (Poland) Iga Świątek [3]
30	33	(Czech Republic) Markéta Vondroušová	1,487	30	120	1,577	Fourth round lost to Veronika Kudermetova [21]
31	51	(Switzerland) Viktorija Golubic	1,107	21	120	1,206	Fourth round lost to (Kazakhstan) Elena Rybakina [17]
32	36	(Spain) Sara Sorribes Tormo	1,318	43	65	1,340	Third round lost to (Spain) Paula Badosa [5]
33	34	(France) Alizé Cornet	1,360	30	10	1,340	Second round lost to Anna Kalinskaya [LL]

=== Withdrawn players ===
The following players would have been seeded, but withdrew before the tournament began.

Rank	Player	Points before	16th best result	2022 points	Points after	Withdrawal reason
1	(Australia) Ashleigh Barty	7,980	0	0	7,980	Fatigue
11	(United States) Danielle Collins	2,972	1	0	2,971	
14	Anastasia Pavlyuchenkova	2,473	0	0	2,473	Knee injury
30	(Italy) Camila Giorgi	1,614	1	0	1,613	

== Other entry information ==
=== Wildcards ===
- (United States) Hailey Baptiste
- (United States) Elvina Kalieva
- (United States) Sofia Kenin
- (United States) Claire Liu
- (United States) Robin Montgomery
- (United States) Emma Navarro
- (United States) Katie Volynets
- (Ukraine) Dayana Yastremska

=== Qualifiers ===
- (United Kingdom) Katie Boulter
- (Czech Republic) Marie Bouzková
- (United Kingdom) Harriet Dart
- (Hungary) Dalma Gálfi
- (Slovenia) Kaja Juvan
- (United States) Ashlyn Krueger
- (United States) Caty McNally
- (Australia) Daria Saville
- (France) Harmony Tan
- (Bulgaria) Viktoriya Tomova
- (China) Wang Qiang
- (United Kingdom) Heather Watson

=== Lucky losers ===
- (Poland) Magdalena Fręch
- Anna Kalinskaya
- (Australia) Astra Sharma

=== Withdrawals ===
- (Australia) Ashleigh Barty → replaced by (France) Océane Dodin
- (United States) Danielle Collins → replaced by (Hungary) Anna Bondár
- (Romania) Jaqueline Cristian → replaced by (Slovakia) Kristína Kučová
- (Italy) Camila Giorgi → replaced by (Japan) Naomi Osaka
- (Czech Republic) Barbora Krejčíková → replaced by (Poland) Magdalena Fręch
- (Czech Republic) Karolína Muchová → replaced by Vera Zvonareva
- Anastasia Pavlyuchenkova → replaced by (China) Zheng Qinwen
- (Sweden) Rebecca Peterson → replaced by Anna Kalinskaya
- (Germany) Andrea Petkovic → replaced by (Australia) Astra Sharma

== Qualifying ==
=== Seeds ===
1. (Belgium) Greet Minnen (first round)
2. (Czech Republic) Marie Bouzková (qualified)
3. (Slovenia) Kaja Juvan (qualified)
4. (Hungary) Panna Udvardy (first round)
5. Anna Kalinskaya (qualifying competition, lucky loser)
6. (China) Wang Xinyu (first round)
7. (Poland) Magdalena Fręch (qualifying competition, lucky loser)
8. (United States) Lauren Davis (first round)
9. (Australia) Astra Sharma (qualifying competition, lucky loser)
10. (France) Harmony Tan (qualified)
11. (France) Diane Parry (first round)
12. (Italy) Lucia Bronzetti (qualifying competition)
13. (Bulgaria) Viktoriya Tomova (qualified)
14. (Hungary) Dalma Gálfi (qualified)
15. Kamilla Rakhimova (first round)
16. (Germany) Jule Niemeier (first round)
17. (France) Chloé Paquet (qualifying competition)
18. (Romania) Irina Bara (first round)
19. (China) Wang Qiang (qualified)
20. (United Kingdom) Heather Watson (qualified)
21. (United Kingdom) Harriet Dart (qualified)
22. (Serbia) Aleksandra Krunić (qualifying competition)
23. (Germany) Anna-Lena Friedsam (first round)
24. (Georgia (country)) Ekaterine Gorgodze (first round)

=== Qualifiers ===
1. (United Kingdom) Heather Watson
2. (Czech Republic) Marie Bouzková
3. (Slovenia) Kaja Juvan
4. (United States) Ashlyn Krueger
5. (China) Wang Qiang
6. (United Kingdom) Katie Boulter
7. (Australia) Daria Saville
8. (United States) Caty McNally
9. (Bulgaria) Viktoriya Tomova
10. (France) Harmony Tan
11. (United Kingdom) Harriet Dart
12. (Hungary) Dalma Gálfi

=== Lucky losers ===
1. (Poland) Magdalena Fręch
2. Anna Kalinskaya
3. (Australia) Astra Sharma

=== Qualifying draw ===
==== First qualifier ====
First round
1	(Belgium) Greet Minnen	3	6	2
(Japan) Mai Hontama	6	2	6
(Spain) Rebeka Masarova	5	2
20	(United Kingdom) Heather Watson	7	6

Qualifying competition
(Japan) Mai Hontama	6	2	1
20	(United Kingdom) Heather Watson	4	6	6

==== Second qualifier ====
First round
2	(Czech Republic) Marie Bouzková	6	7
WC	(Czech Republic) Linda Fruhvirtová	0	5
(Hungary) Réka Luca Jani	4	6	4
17	(France) Chloé Paquet	6	3	6

Qualifying competition
2	(Czech Republic) Marie Bouzková	3	6	6
17	(France) Chloé Paquet	6	1	4

==== Third qualifier ====
First round
3	(Slovenia) Kaja Juvan	7	6
PR	(Germany) Tatjana Maria	5	2
(Ukraine) Lesia Tsurenko	6	3	6
18	(Romania) Irina Bara	0	6	2

Qualifying competition
3	(Slovenia) Kaja Juvan	3
(Ukraine) Lesia Tsurenko	3^{r}

==== Fourth qualifier ====
First round
4	(Hungary) Panna Udvardy	6^{5}	6^{2}
WC	(United States) Ashlyn Krueger	7^{7}	7^{7}
(United States) Christina McHale	3	7	6
16	(Germany) Jule Niemeier	6	5	4

Qualifying competition
WC	(United States) Ashlyn Krueger	1	6	6
(United States) Christina McHale	6	4	0

==== Fifth qualifier ====
First round
5	Anna Kalinskaya	6	6
WC	(United States) Reese Brantmeier	4	1
WC	(United States) Theadora Rabman	0	0
19	(China) Wang Qiang	6	6

Qualifying competition
5	Anna Kalinskaya	3	4
19	(China) Wang Qiang	6	6

==== Sixth qualifier ====
First round
6	(China) Wang Xinyu	7^{10}	4	4
(United Kingdom) Katie Boulter	6^{8}	6	6
(Italy) Sara Errani	6^{5}	6	6
24	(Georgia (country)) Ekaterine Gorgodze	7^{7}	4	0

Qualifying competition
(United Kingdom) Katie Boulter	6	6
(Italy) Sara Errani	3	3

==== Seventh qualifier ====
First round
7	(Poland) Magdalena Fręch	6	6
WC	(United States) Alycia Parks	2	3
PR	(Australia) Daria Saville	7	6
15	Kamilla Rakhimova	5	3

Qualifying competition
7	(Poland) Magdalena Fręch	0	6	3
PR	(Australia) Daria Saville	6	3	6

==== Eighth qualifier ====
First round
8	(United States) Lauren Davis	5	3
PR	(Belgium) Kirsten Flipkens	7	6
(United States) Caty McNally	4	7	7
23	(Germany) Anna-Lena Friedsam	6	5	5

Qualifying competition
PR	(Belgium) Kirsten Flipkens	5	6	4
(United States) Caty McNally	7	3	6

==== Ninth qualifier ====
First round
9	(Australia) Astra Sharma	6	7
(China) Yuan Yue	2	5
WC	(United States) Elizabeth Mandlik	2	1
13	(Bulgaria) Viktoriya Tomova	6	6

Qualifying competition
9	(Australia) Astra Sharma	4	1
13	(Bulgaria) Viktoriya Tomova	6	6

==== Tenth qualifier ====
First round
10	(France) Harmony Tan	6	6
PR	(Australia) Priscilla Hon	3	4
Olga Govortsova	5	5
22	(Serbia) Aleksandra Krunić	7	7

Qualifying competition
10	(France) Harmony Tan	0	6	6
22	(Serbia) Aleksandra Krunić	6	2	2

==== Eleventh qualifier ====
First round
11	(France) Diane Parry	6	3	2
Anastasia Gasanova	4	6	6
(Netherlands) Lesley Pattinama Kerkhove	1	5
21	(United Kingdom) Harriet Dart	6	7

Qualifying competition
Anastasia Gasanova	2	6	3
21	(United Kingdom) Harriet Dart	6	3	6

==== Twelfth qualifier ====
First round
12	(Italy) Lucia Bronzetti	6	6
(Mexico) Renata Zarazúa	3	1
(Australia) Maddison Inglis	6	3	3
14	(Hungary) Dalma Gálfi	4	6	6

Qualifying competition
12	(Italy) Lucia Bronzetti	2	6^{5}
14	(Hungary) Dalma Gálfi	6	7^{7}
