= 2022 St. Petersburg Ladies' Trophy =

- Date: 6 – 13 February
- Edition: 13th
- Category: WTA 500
- Prize money: $703,580
- Surface: Hard (Indoor)
- Location: Saint Petersburg, Russia
- Venue: Sibur Arena

Champions

Singles
- (Estonia) Anett Kontaveit

Doubles
- (Russia) Anna Kalinskaya / (United States) Caty McNally
← 2021 ·	St. Petersburg Ladies' Trophy	· 2023 →

The 2022 St. Petersburg Ladies' Trophy was a professional tennis tournament played on indoor hard courts. It was the 13th edition of the event and a WTA 500 tournament on the 2022 WTA Tour. It was held between 6 and 13 February 2022.

== Champions ==
=== Singles ===
- (Estonia) Anett Kontaveit def. (Greece) Maria Sakkari, 5–7, 7–6^{(7–4)}, 7–5

=== Doubles ===
- (Russia) Anna Kalinskaya / (United States) Caty McNally def. (Poland) Alicja Rosolska / (New Zealand) Erin Routliffe, 6–3, 6–7^{(5–7)}, [10–4]

== Point distribution ==
Event	W	F	SF	QF	Round of 16	Round of 32	Q	Q2	Q1
Singles	470	305	185	100	55	1	25	13	1
Doubles	470	305	185	100	1	—	—	—	—

== Prize money ==
Event	W	F	SF	QF	Round of 16	Round of 32^{1}	Q2	Q1
Singles	$68,570	$51,000	$32,400	$15,500	$8,200	$6,650	$5,000	$2,565
Doubles*	$25,230	$17,750	$10,000	$5,500	$3,500	—	—	—

_{^{1}Qualifiers prize money is also the Round of 32 prize money.}
_{*per team}

== Singles main draw entrants ==
=== Seeds ===
Country	Player	Rank^{1}	Seed
GRE	Maria Sakkari	8	1
EST	Anett Kontaveit	9	2
KAZ	Elena Rybakina	12	3
~~RUS~~	~~Anastasia Pavlyuchenkova~~	~~14~~	~~4~~
SUI	Belinda Bencic	19	5
CZE	Petra Kvitová	24	6
LAT	Jeļena Ostapenko	25	7
BEL	Elise Mertens	26	8

- ^{1} Rankings as of January 31, 2022.

=== Other entrants ===
The following players received wildcards into the singles main draw:

- (Czech Republic) Petra Kvitová
- (Russia) Kamilla Rakhimova
- (China) Wang Xinyu
- (Russia) Vera Zvonareva

The following players received entry from the qualifying draw:

- (Russia) Varvara Gracheva
- (Slovenia) Kaja Juvan
- (Germany) Jule Niemeier
- (Sweden) Rebecca Peterson

The following player received entry as a lucky loser :

- (United States) Bernarda Pera

=== Withdrawals ===
Before the tournament

- (Spain) Paula Badosa → replaced by (Romania) Irina-Camelia Begu
- (Tunisia) Ons Jabeur → replaced by (Belarus) Aliaksandra Sasnovich
- (Ukraine) Anhelina Kalinina → replaced by (China) Zhang Shuai
- (Russia) Daria Kasatkina → replaced by (Romania) Jaqueline Cristian
- (Russia) Anastasia Pavlyuchenkova → replaced by (United States) Bernarda Pera
- (Czech Republic) Karolína Plíšková → replaced by (France) Alizé Cornet
- (Kazakhstan) Yulia Putintseva → replaced by (Russia) Anastasia Potapova
- (Spain) Sara Sorribes Tormo → replaced by (Germany) Andrea Petkovic

During the tournament

- (Kazakhstan) Elena Rybakina

== Doubles main draw entrants ==
=== Seeds ===
Country	Player	Country	Player	Rank^{1}	Seed
~~RUS~~	~~Veronika Kudermetova~~	~~BEL~~	~~Elise Mertens~~	~~13~~	~~1~~
UKR	Lyudmyla Kichenok	LAT	Jeļena Ostapenko	57	2
CHN	Xu Yifan	CHN	Yang Zhaoxuan	74	3
JPN	Eri Hozumi	JPN	Makoto Ninomiya	86	4

- ^{1} Rankings as of January 31, 2022.

=== Other entrants ===
The following pair received a wildcard into the doubles main draw:

- (Russia) Kamilla Rakhimova / (Russia) Ekaterina Shalimova

=== Withdrawals ===
Before the tournament

- (Ukraine) Nadiia Kichenok / (Romania) Raluca Olaru → replaced by (Romania) Sorana Cîrstea / (Romania) Raluca Olaru
- (Russia) Veronika Kudermetova / (Belgium) Elise Mertens → replaced by (Russia) Ekaterina Alexandrova / (Russia) Yana Sizikova
- (Poland) Magda Linette / (United States) Bernarda Pera → replaced by (Romania) Irina Bara / (Georgia (country)) Ekaterine Gorgodze
