= 2022 St. Petersburg Ladies' Trophy – Singles =

Singles
- 2022 St. Petersburg Ladies' Trophy

Final
- Champion: (Estonia) Anett Kontaveit
- Runner-up: (Greece) Maria Sakkari
- Score: 5–7, 7–6^{(7–4)}, 7–5

Details
- Draw: 32 (4Q, 4WC)
- Seeds: 8

Events
Singles	Doubles
← 2021 ·	St. Petersburg Ladies' Trophy	· 2023 →

Anett Kontaveit defeated Maria Sakkari in the final, 5–7, 7–6^{(7–4)}, 7–5 to win the singles title at the 2022 St. Petersburg Ladies' Trophy. Kontaveit's victory in the final was her 20th consecutive match win on indoor hard courts, dating back to the 2021 Ostrava Open; this is the longest such streak since Justine Henin won 22 matches on indoor courts between October 2007 and May 2010.

Daria Kasatkina was the defending champion, but withdrew before the tournament began.

== Seeds ==
1. (Greece) Maria Sakkari (final)
2. (Estonia) Anett Kontaveit (champion)
3. (Kazakhstan) Elena Rybakina (second round, withdrew)
4. (Russia) Anastasia Pavlyuchenkova (withdrew due to a left knee injury)
5. (Switzerland) Belinda Bencic (quarterfinals)
6. (Czech Republic) Petra Kvitová (second round)
7. (Latvia) Jeļena Ostapenko (semifinals)
8. (Belgium) Elise Mertens (quarterfinals)

== Draw ==
=== Key ===
- Q = Qualifier
- WC = Wild card
- LL = Lucky loser
- Alt = Alternate
- SE = Special exempt
- PR = Protected ranking
- ITF = ITF entry
- JE = Junior exempt
- w/o = Walkover
- r = Retired
- d = Defaulted
- SR = Special ranking

=== Finals ===
Semifinals
1	(Greece) Maria Sakkari	6	6^{4}	6
(Romania) Irina-Camelia Begu	4	7^{7}	4
7	(Latvia) Jeļena Ostapenko	3	4
2	(Estonia) Anett Kontaveit	6	6

Final
1	(Greece) Maria Sakkari	7	6^{4}	5
2	(Estonia) Anett Kontaveit	5	7^{7}	7

=== Top half ===
First round
1	(Greece) M Sakkari	6	6
(Russia) A Potapova	4	4
(Italy) C Giorgi	2	6	2
(Russia) E Alexandrova	6	1	6
WC	(Russia) K Rakhimova	4	6	4
(Croatia) P Martić	6	2	6
(France) A Cornet	6	2	4
8	(Belgium) E Mertens	3	6	6
3	(Kazakhstan) E Rybakina	6	6
Q	(Russia) V Gracheva	2	1
(Czech Republic) T Martincová	2	6	6
WC	(Russia) V Zvonareva	6	1	4
(China) S Zhang	3	1
(Romania) I-C Begu	6	6
Q	(Germany) J Niemeier	2	1
6/WC	(Czech Republic) P Kvitová	6	6

Second round
1	(Greece) M Sakkari	6	6
(Russia) E Alexandrova	2	4
(Croatia) P Martić	4	6	2
8	(Belgium) E Mertens	6	3	6
3	(Kazakhstan) E Rybakina
(Czech Republic) T Martincová	w/o
(Romania) I-C Begu	6	6
6/WC	(Czech Republic) P Kvitová	4	0

Quarterfinals
1	(Greece) M Sakkari	7^{9}	6
8	(Belgium) E Mertens	6^{7}	2
(Czech Republic) T Martincová	4	2
(Romania) I-C Begu	6	6

Semifinals
1	(Greece) M Sakkari	6	6^{4}	6
(Romania) I-C Begu	4	7^{7}	4

=== Bottom half ===
First round
7	(Latvia) J Ostapenko	6	6
WC	(China) Xin Wang	1	4
(Germany) A Petkovic	7^{7}	6
Q	(Sweden) R Peterson	6^{5}	2
(Belarus) A Sasnovich	7	4	6
(Poland) M Linette	5	6	4
(Romania) J Cristian	7^{7}	6
LL	(United States) B Pera	6^{3}	4
5	(Switzerland) B Bencic	6	4	7^{7}
(Russia) V Kudermetova	2	6	6^{5}
Q	(Slovenia) K Juvan	4	6	6
(Belgium) A Van Uytvanck	6	4	3
(Czech Republic) M Vondroušová	5	6	4
(Romania) S Cîrstea	7	3	6
(Switzerland) J Teichmann	3	6	3
2	(Estonia) A Kontaveit	6	1	6

Second round
7	(Latvia) J Ostapenko	6	6
(Germany) A Petkovic	1	2
(Belarus) A Sasnovich	6	6
(Romania) J Cristian	2	3
5	(Switzerland) B Bencic	6	7^{7}
Q	(Slovenia) K Juvan	1	6^{2}
(Romania) S Cîrstea	4	5
2	(Estonia) A Kontaveit	6	7

Quarterfinals
7	(Latvia) J Ostapenko	7^{7}	4	6
(Belarus) A Sasnovich	6^{5}	6	3
5	(Switzerland) B Bencic	6^{7}	2
2	(Estonia) A Kontaveit	7^{9}	6

Semifinals
7	(Latvia) J Ostapenko	3	4
2	(Estonia) A Kontaveit	6	6

== Qualifying ==
=== Seeds ===
1. (Sweden) Rebecca Peterson (qualified)
2. (Slovakia) Kristína Kučová (first round)
3. (Russia) Varvara Gracheva (qualified)
4. (Hungary) Anna Bondár (first round)
5. (France) Kristina Mladenovic (first round)
6. (United States) Bernarda Pera (qualifying competition, lucky loser)
7. (Romania) Ana Bogdan (qualifying competition)
8. (Slovenia) Kaja Juvan (qualified)

=== Qualifiers ===
1. (Sweden) Rebecca Peterson
2. (Slovenia) Kaja Juvan
3. (Russia) Varvara Gracheva
4. (Germany) Jule Niemeier

=== Lucky loser ===
1. (United States) Bernarda Pera

=== Qualifying draw ===
==== First qualifier ====
First round
1	(Sweden) Rebecca Peterson	6	6
(Russia) Valeria Savinykh	3	1
WC	(Russia) Yaroslava Bartashevich	2	6	3
(Georgia (country)) Ekaterine Gorgodze	6	0	6
(Russia) Anastasia Gasanova	4	6^{7}
(Russia) Ekaterina Kazionova	6	7^{9}
(Bulgaria) Viktoriya Tomova	6	2	1
6	(United States) Bernarda Pera	3	6	6

Second round
1	(Sweden) Rebecca Peterson	6	7
(Georgia (country)) Ekaterine Gorgodze	3	5
(Russia) Ekaterina Kazionova	2	1
6	(United States) Bernarda Pera	6	6

Qualifying competition
1	(Sweden) Rebecca Peterson	5	6	6
6	(United States) Bernarda Pera	7	0	1

==== Second qualifier ====
First round
2	(Slovakia) Kristína Kučová	6	5	6^{5}
(United States) Caty McNally	4	7	7^{7}
(Uzbekistan) Nigina Abduraimova	5	2
(Russia) Anna Kalinskaya	7	6
(Russia) Anastasia Tikhonova	3	3
WC	(Russia) Ekaterina Shalimova	6	6
(Russia) Vitalia Diatchenko	1	4
8	(Slovenia) Kaja Juvan	6	6

Second round
(United States) Caty McNally	6	2	6
(Russia) Anna Kalinskaya	4	6	4
WC	(Russia) Ekaterina Shalimova	3	2
8	(Slovenia) Kaja Juvan	6	6

Qualifying competition
(United States) Caty McNally	4	6	3
8	(Slovenia) Kaja Juvan	6	3	6

==== Third qualifier ====
First round
3	(Russia) Varvara Gracheva	6	6
(Russia) Amina Anshba	1	2
(Romania) Irina Bara	6	6
WC	(Russia) Diana Shnaider	4	2
(Norway) Ulrikke Eikeri	6	7
(United Kingdom) Harriet Dart	1	5
(China) Lin Zhu	1	2
7	(Romania) Ana Bogdan	6	6

Second round
3	(Russia) Varvara Gracheva	6	6
(Romania) Irina Bara	3	3
(Norway) Ulrikke Eikeri	5	3
7	(Romania) Ana Bogdan	7	6

Qualifying competition
3	(Russia) Varvara Gracheva	6	6
7	(Romania) Ana Bogdan	4	4

==== Fourth qualifier ====
First round
4	(Hungary) Anna Bondár	4	3
(Germany) Jule Niemeier	6	6
(Australia) Seone Mendez	5	6^{3}
(Russia) Natalia Vikhlyantseva	7	7^{7}
(Slovakia) Viktória Kužmová	6	6
(Spain) Cristina Bucșa	4	2
WC	(Russia) Erika Andreeva	6	6^{8}	7
5	(France) Kristina Mladenovic	3	7^{10}	5

Second round
(Germany) Jule Niemeier	6	6
(Russia) Natalia Vikhlyantseva	2	1
(Slovakia) Viktória Kužmová	5	6	1
WC	(Russia) Erika Andreeva	7	4	6

Qualifying competition
(Germany) Jule Niemeier	4	6	6
WC	(Russia) Erika Andreeva	6	1	1
