= 2021 Iga Świątek tennis season =

2021 tennis player season

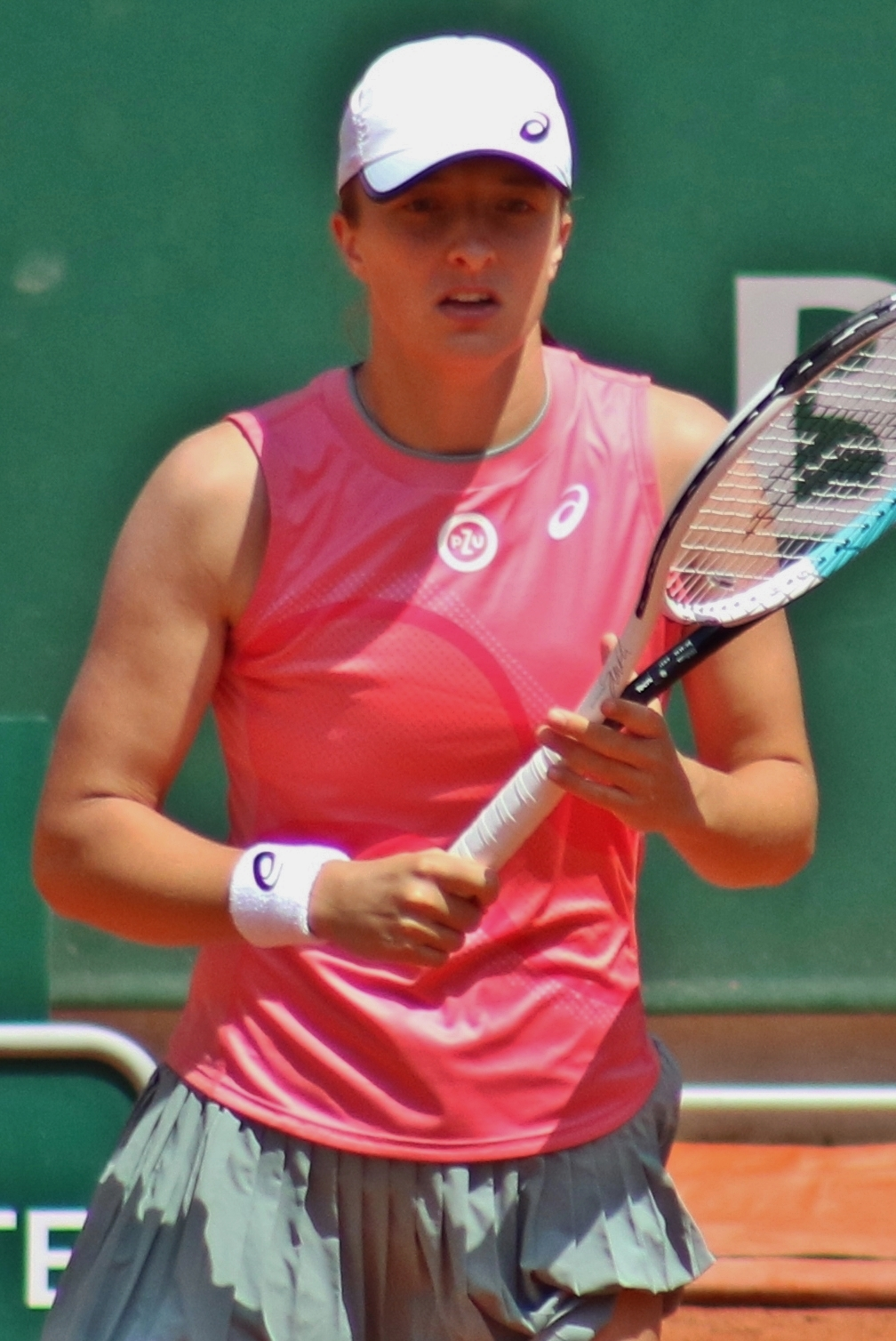
- Swiatek playing at the French Open
- Full name: Iga Świątek
- Country: Poland
- Calendar prize money: $1,923,151

Singles
- Season record: 36–15
- Calendar titles: 2
- Year-end ranking: No. 9
- Ranking change from previous year: ▲8

Grand Slam & significant results
- Australian Open: 4R
- French Open: QF
- Wimbledon: 4R
- US Open: 4R
- Championships: RR
- Olympic Games: 2R

Doubles
- Season record: 12–5
- Calendar titles: 0
- Year-end ranking: No. 41
- Ranking change from previous year: ▲34

Grand Slam doubles results
- Australian Open: A
- French Open: F
- Wimbledon: A
- US Open: A
- WTA Championships: DNQ
- Olympic Games: A

Mixed doubles
- Season record: 2–2

Grand Slam mixed doubles results
- Australian Open: 2R
- French Open: A
- Wimbledon: A
- US Open: A
- Olympic Games: QF
- Last updated on: 1 April 2022.

The 2021 Iga Świątek tennis season officially began on 1 February 2021 as the start of the 2021 WTA Tour. Iga Świątek entered the season as world number 17 in singles. The season saw the Polish player won two WTA singles titles and reached a career-high world number 4.

== Season summary ==
=== Early hard court season ===
Świątek advanced to the quarterfinals at the Gippsland Trophy to start her season, where she was defeated by Ekaterina Alexandrova in straight sets. At the Australian Open, her performance was marred by a significant number of unforced errors, leading to her fourth-round loss to Simona Halep in three sets. In the Adelaide International, Świątek clinched her first title of the year without losing a set. This achievement allowed her to ascend into the top 15 in the singles rankings. However, during the Miami Open, Świątek was ousted in the third round by Ana Konjuh in a three-set encounter.

=== Clay season ===
Świątek's next tournament was the Madrid Open, where she made her tournament debut. She reached the third round and lost to the world no. 1 Ashleigh Barty in straight sets. She then won her second title of the year at the Italian Open, defeating former champion Karolína Plíšková in just 46 minutes by sending a double-bagel. The title also saw her move into the top 10 on 17 May 2021, as world no. 9.

Świątek failed to defend her French Open singles title, but she did reach the quarterfinals, where she lost to Maria Sakkari in straight sets. However, she reached the final in doubles with her partner Bethanie Mattek-Sands, but they lost to Czech Republican pair of Barbora Krejčíková and Kateřina Siniaková in straight sets.

=== Grass season ===
Świątek participated in Eastbourne as the start of her grass season, but she was upset by Daria Kasatkina in the second round despite winning the first set. At Wimbledon, she reached fourth round, where she lost to Ons Jabeur in three sets.

=== US Open series ===
Following a second-round loss against Paula Badosa at the Summer Olympics, Świątek then had an early exit in Cincinnati, where she once again lost to Ons Jabeur. Świątek then entered the US Open and reached the fourth round, marking her the only player to have reached the second week of all four Grand Slam championships in the 2021 season.

=== Closing tournaments ===
Świątek entered the Ostrava Open as the top seed. She reached semifinals before losing to Maria Sakkari in straight sets. She subsequently lost in the fourth round match against Jeļena Ostapenko in Indian Wells. Nevertheless, Świątek still qualified WTA Finals for the first time in her career.

Świątek failed to advance into the semifinals at the WTA Finals, respectively losing to Maria Sakkari in two sets and Aryna Sabalenka in three sets. However, she did manage to wrap up her 2021 campaign with a victory over Paula Badosa. She eventually finished the season as world no. 9.

== All matches ==
Key
W	F	SF	QF	#R	RR	Q#	P#	DNQ	A	Z#	PO	G	S	B	NMS	NTI	P	NH

(W) winner; (F) finalist; (SF) semifinalist; (QF) quarterfinalist; (#R) rounds 4, 3, 2, 1; (RR) round-robin stage; (Q#) qualification round; (P#) preliminary round; (DNQ) did not qualify; (A) absent; (Z#) Davis/Fed Cup Zonal Group (with number indication) or (PO) play-off; (G) gold, (S) silver or (B) bronze Olympic/Paralympic medal; (NMS) not a Masters tournament; (NTI) not a Tier I tournament; (P) postponed; (NH) not held; (SR) strike rate (events won / competed); (W–L) win–loss record.
To avoid confusion and double counting, these charts are updated at the conclusion of a tournament or when the player's participation has ended.

=== Singles matches ===
Tournament	Match	Round	Opponent	Rank	Result	Score
Gippsland Trophy; Melbourne, Australia; WTA 500; Hard, outdoor; 1 February 2021 – 7 February 2021	–	1R	Bye			
Gippsland Trophy; Melbourne, Australia; WTA 500; Hard, outdoor; 1 February 2021 – 7 February 2021	1	2R	(Slovenia) Kaja Juvan	104	Win	6–3, 6–3
Gippsland Trophy; Melbourne, Australia; WTA 500; Hard, outdoor; 1 February 2021 – 7 February 2021	2	3R	(Russia) Ekaterina Alexandrova (9)	33	Loss	4–6, 2–6
Australian Open; Melbourne, Australia; Grand Slam; Hard, outdoor; 8 February 2021 – 21 February 2021	3	1R	(Netherlands) Arantxa Rus	77	Win	6–1, 6–3
Australian Open; Melbourne, Australia; Grand Slam; Hard, outdoor; 8 February 2021 – 21 February 2021	4	2R	(Italy) Camila Giorgi	79	Win	6–2, 6–4
Australian Open; Melbourne, Australia; Grand Slam; Hard, outdoor; 8 February 2021 – 21 February 2021	5	3R	(France) Fiona Ferro	46	Win	6–4, 6–3
Australian Open; Melbourne, Australia; Grand Slam; Hard, outdoor; 8 February 2021 – 21 February 2021	6	4R	(Romania) Simona Halep (2)	2	Loss	6–3, 1–6, 4–6
Adelaide International; Adelaide, Australia; WTA 500; Hard, outdoor; 22 February 2021 – 28 February 2021	7	1R	(United States) Madison Brengle (Q)	81	Win	6–3, 6–4
Adelaide International; Adelaide, Australia; WTA 500; Hard, outdoor; 22 February 2021 – 28 February 2021	8	2R	(Australia) Maddison Inglis (Q)	136	Win	6–1, 6–3
Adelaide International; Adelaide, Australia; WTA 500; Hard, outdoor; 22 February 2021 – 28 February 2021	9	QF	(United States) Danielle Collins	37	Win	6–2, 3–0, ret.
Adelaide International; Adelaide, Australia; WTA 500; Hard, outdoor; 22 February 2021 – 28 February 2021	10	SF	(Switzerland) Jil Teichmann	61	Win	6–3, 6–2
Adelaide International; Adelaide, Australia; WTA 500; Hard, outdoor; 22 February 2021 – 28 February 2021	11	W	(Switzerland) Belinda Bencic (5)	12	Win (1)	6–2, 6–2
Dubai Tennis Championships; Dubai, United Arab Emirates; WTA 1000; Hard, outdoor; 8 March 2021 – 14 March 2021	–	1R	Bye			
Dubai Tennis Championships; Dubai, United Arab Emirates; WTA 1000; Hard, outdoor; 8 March 2021 – 14 March 2021	12	2R	(Japan) Misaki Doi (LL)	77	Win	6–2, 6–4
Dubai Tennis Championships; Dubai, United Arab Emirates; WTA 1000; Hard, outdoor; 8 March 2021 – 14 March 2021	13	3R	(Spain) Garbiñe Muguruza (9)	16	Loss	0–6, 4–6
Miami Open; Miami Gardens, United States; WTA 1000; Hard, outdoor; 22 March 2021 – 4 April 2021	–	1R	Bye			
Miami Open; Miami Gardens, United States; WTA 1000; Hard, outdoor; 22 March 2021 – 4 April 2021	14	2R	(Czech Republic) Barbora Krejčíková	39	Win	6–4, 6–2
Miami Open; Miami Gardens, United States; WTA 1000; Hard, outdoor; 22 March 2021 – 4 April 2021	15	3R	(Croatia) Ana Konjuh (WC)	338	Loss	4–6, 6–2, 2–6
Madrid Open; Madrid, Spain; WTA 1000; Clay, outdoor; 26 April 2021 – 9 May 2021	16	1R	(United States) Alison Riske	27	Win	6–1, 6–1
Madrid Open; Madrid, Spain; WTA 1000; Clay, outdoor; 26 April 2021 – 9 May 2021	17	2R	(Germany) Laura Siegemund (Q)	59	Win	6–3, 6–3
Madrid Open; Madrid, Spain; WTA 1000; Clay, outdoor; 26 April 2021 – 9 May 2021	18	3R	(Australia) Ashleigh Barty (1)	1	Loss	5–7, 4–6
Italian Open; Rome, Italy; WTA 1000; Clay, outdoor; 10 May 2021 – 16 May 2021	19	1R	(United States) Alison Riske	27	Win	5–4, ret.
Italian Open; Rome, Italy; WTA 1000; Clay, outdoor; 10 May 2021 – 16 May 2021	20	2R	(United States) Madison Keys	23	Win	7–5, 6–1
Italian Open; Rome, Italy; WTA 1000; Clay, outdoor; 10 May 2021 – 16 May 2021	21	3R	(Czech Republic) Barbora Krejčíková	40	Win	3–6, 7–6^{(7–5)}, 7–5
Italian Open; Rome, Italy; WTA 1000; Clay, outdoor; 10 May 2021 – 16 May 2021	22	QF	(Ukraine) Elina Svitolina (5)	6	Win	6–2, 7–5
Italian Open; Rome, Italy; WTA 1000; Clay, outdoor; 10 May 2021 – 16 May 2021	23	SF	(United States) Coco Gauff	35	Win	7–6^{(7–3)}, 6–3
Italian Open; Rome, Italy; WTA 1000; Clay, outdoor; 10 May 2021 – 16 May 2021	24	W	(Czech Republic) Karolína Plíšková (9)	9	Win (2)	6–0, 6–0
French Open; Paris, France; Grand Slam; Clay, outdoor; 31 May 2021 – 13 June 2021	25	1R	(Slovenia) Kaja Juvan	101	Win	6–0, 7–5
French Open; Paris, France; Grand Slam; Clay, outdoor; 31 May 2021 – 13 June 2021	26	2R	(Sweden) Rebecca Peterson	60	Win	6–1, 6–1
French Open; Paris, France; Grand Slam; Clay, outdoor; 31 May 2021 – 13 June 2021	27	3R	(Estonia) Anett Kontaveit (30)	31	Win	7–6^{(7–4)}, 6–0
French Open; Paris, France; Grand Slam; Clay, outdoor; 31 May 2021 – 13 June 2021	28	4R	(Ukraine) Marta Kostyuk	81	Win	6–3, 6–4
French Open; Paris, France; Grand Slam; Clay, outdoor; 31 May 2021 – 13 June 2021	29	QF	(Greece) Maria Sakkari (17)	18	Loss	4–6, 4–6
Eastbourne International; Eastbourne, Great Britain; WTA 500; Grass, outdoor; 21 June 2021 – 27 June 2021	30	1R	(United Kingdom) Heather Watson (WC)	65	Win	6–3, 6–7^{(4–7)}, 7–5
Eastbourne International; Eastbourne, Great Britain; WTA 500; Grass, outdoor; 21 June 2021 – 27 June 2021	31	2R	(Russia) Daria Kasatkina	34	Loss	6–4, 0–6, 1–6
The Championships, Wimbledon; London, Great Britain; Grand Slam; Grass, outdoor; 28 June 2021 – 12 July 2021	32	1R	(Chinese Taipei) Hsieh Su-wei	69	Win	6–4, 6–4
The Championships, Wimbledon; London, Great Britain; Grand Slam; Grass, outdoor; 28 June 2021 – 12 July 2021	33	2R	(Russia) Vera Zvonareva	96	Win	6–1, 6–3
The Championships, Wimbledon; London, Great Britain; Grand Slam; Grass, outdoor; 28 June 2021 – 12 July 2021	34	3R	(Romania) Irina-Camelia Begu	79	Win	6–1, 6–0
The Championships, Wimbledon; London, Great Britain; Grand Slam; Grass, outdoor; 28 June 2021 – 12 July 2021	35	4R	(Tunisia) Ons Jabeur (21)	24	Loss	7–5, 1–6, 1–6
Summer Olympics; Tokyo, Japan; Olympic Games; Hard, outdoor; 24 July 2021 – 31 July 2021	36	1R	(Germany) Mona Barthel (PR)	212	Win	6–2, 6–2
Summer Olympics; Tokyo, Japan; Olympic Games; Hard, outdoor; 24 July 2021 – 31 July 2021	37	2R	(Spain) Paula Badosa	29	Loss	3–6, 6–7^{(4–7)}
Cincinnati Open; Mason, United States; WTA 1000; Hard, outdoor; 16 August 2021 – 22 August 2021	–	1R	Bye			
Cincinnati Open; Mason, United States; WTA 1000; Hard, outdoor; 16 August 2021 – 22 August 2021	38	2R	(Tunisia) Ons Jabeur	20	Loss	3–6, 3–6
US Open; New York, United States; Grand Slam; Hard, outdoor; 30 August 2021 – 12 September 2021	39	1R	(United States) Jamie Loeb (Q)	194	Win	6–3, 6–4
US Open; New York, United States; Grand Slam; Hard, outdoor; 30 August 2021 – 12 September 2021	40	2R	(France) Fiona Ferro	74	Win	3–6, 7–6^{(7–3)}, 6–0
US Open; New York, United States; Grand Slam; Hard, outdoor; 30 August 2021 – 12 September 2021	41	3R	(Estonia) Anett Kontaveit (28)	28	Win	6–3, 4–6, 6–3
US Open; New York, United States; Grand Slam; Hard, outdoor; 30 August 2021 – 12 September 2021	42	4R	(Switzerland) Belinda Bencic (11)	12	Loss	6–7^{(12–14)}, 3–6
Ostrava Open; Ostrava, Czech Republic; WTA 500; Hard, indoor; 20 September 2021 – 26 September 2021	–	1R	Bye			
Ostrava Open; Ostrava, Czech Republic; WTA 500; Hard, indoor; 20 September 2021 – 26 September 2021	43	2R	(Kazakhstan) Yulia Putintseva	49	Win	6–4, 6–4
Ostrava Open; Ostrava, Czech Republic; WTA 500; Hard, indoor; 20 September 2021 – 26 September 2021	44	QF	(Kazakhstan) Elena Rybakina (7)	16	Win	7–6^{(7–5)}, 6–2
Ostrava Open; Ostrava, Czech Republic; WTA 500; Hard, indoor; 20 September 2021 – 26 September 2021	45	SF	(Greece) Maria Sakkari (4)	12	Loss	4–6, 5–7
Indian Wells Open; Indian Wells, United States; WTA 1000; Hard, outdoor; 4 October 2021 – 17 October 2021	–	1R	Bye			
Indian Wells Open; Indian Wells, United States; WTA 1000; Hard, outdoor; 4 October 2021 – 17 October 2021	46	2R	(Croatia) Petra Martić	45	Win	6–1, 6–3
Indian Wells Open; Indian Wells, United States; WTA 1000; Hard, outdoor; 4 October 2021 – 17 October 2021	47	3R	(Russia) Veronika Kudermetova (25)	31	Win	6–1, 6–0
Indian Wells Open; Indian Wells, United States; WTA 1000; Hard, outdoor; 4 October 2021 – 17 October 2021	48	4R	(Latvia) Jeļena Ostapenko (24)	29	Loss	4–6, 3–6
WTA Finals; Guadalajara, Mexico; Year-end championships; Hard, outdoor; 10 November 2021 – 17 November 2021	49	RR	(Greece) Maria Sakkari (4)	6	Loss	2–6, 4–6
WTA Finals; Guadalajara, Mexico; Year-end championships; Hard, outdoor; 10 November 2021 – 17 November 2021	50	RR	(Belarus) Aryna Sabalenka (1)	2	Loss	6–2, 2–6, 5–7
WTA Finals; Guadalajara, Mexico; Year-end championships; Hard, outdoor; 10 November 2021 – 17 November 2021	51	RR	(Spain) Paula Badosa (7)	10	Win	7–5, 6–4

=== Doubles matches ===
Tournament	Match	Round	Opponent	Rank	Result	Score
Miami Open; Miami Gardens, United States; WTA 1000; Hard, outdoor; 22 March 2021 – 4 April 2021; Partner: (United States) Bethanie Mattek-Sands	1	1R	(Romania) Monica Niculescu / (Russia) Anna Blinkova	52 / 53	Win	6–0, 6–1
Miami Open; Miami Gardens, United States; WTA 1000; Hard, outdoor; 22 March 2021 – 4 April 2021; Partner: (United States) Bethanie Mattek-Sands	2	2R	(China) Xu Yifan / (China) Zhang Shuai	9 / 30	Win	6–3, 6–1
Miami Open; Miami Gardens, United States; WTA 1000; Hard, outdoor; 22 March 2021 – 4 April 2021; Partner: (United States) Bethanie Mattek-Sands	3	QF	(Latvia) Jeļena Ostapenko / (Ukraine) Lyudmyla Kichenok	23 / 47	Win	6–1, 6–4
Miami Open; Miami Gardens, United States; WTA 1000; Hard, outdoor; 22 March 2021 – 4 April 2021; Partner: (United States) Bethanie Mattek-Sands	4	SF	(Japan) Shuko Aoyama / (Japan) Ena Shibahara (5)	14 / 16	Loss	6–3, 6–7^{(4–7)}, [2–10]
Madrid Open; Madrid, Spain; WTA 1000; Clay, outdoor; 26 April 2021 – 9 May 2021; Partner: (United States) Bethanie Mattek-Sands	5	1R	(Brazil) Luisa Stefani / (United States) Hayley Carter (8)	26 / 27	Win	2–6, 6–3, [10–6]
Madrid Open; Madrid, Spain; WTA 1000; Clay, outdoor; 26 April 2021 – 9 May 2021; Partner: (United States) Bethanie Mattek-Sands	6	2R	(Russia) Vera Zvonareva / (Russia) Elena Vesnina (PR)	37 / 303	Loss	6–4, 3–6, [5–10]
French Open; Paris, France; Grand Slam; Clay, outdoor; 31 May 2021 – 13 June 2021; Partner: (United States) Bethanie Mattek-Sands	7	1R	(France) Séléna Janicijevic / (France) Aubane Droguet (WC)	570 / 591	Win	6–0, 6–1
French Open; Paris, France; Grand Slam; Clay, outdoor; 31 May 2021 – 13 June 2021; Partner: (United States) Bethanie Mattek-Sands	8	2R	(Germany) Anna-Lena Friedsam / (China) Wang Yafan	52 / 70	Win	7–5, 6–3
French Open; Paris, France; Grand Slam; Clay, outdoor; 31 May 2021 – 13 June 2021; Partner: (United States) Bethanie Mattek-Sands	9	3R	(Belgium) Elise Mertens / (Chinese Taipei) Hsieh Su-wei (1)	2 / 3	Win	5–7, 6–4, 7–5
French Open; Paris, France; Grand Slam; Clay, outdoor; 31 May 2021 – 13 June 2021; Partner: (United States) Bethanie Mattek-Sands	10	QF	(Croatia) Darija Jurak Schreiber / (Slovenia) Andreja Klepač (11)	28 / 40	Win	6–3, 6–2
French Open; Paris, France; Grand Slam; Clay, outdoor; 31 May 2021 – 13 June 2021; Partner: (United States) Bethanie Mattek-Sands	11	SF	(Romania) Irina-Camelia Begu / (Argentina) Nadia Podoroska	104 / 132	Win	6–3, 6–4
French Open; Paris, France; Grand Slam; Clay, outdoor; 31 May 2021 – 13 June 2021; Partner: (United States) Bethanie Mattek-Sands	12	F	(Czech Republic) Barbora Krejčíková / (Czech Republic) Kateřina Siniaková (2)	7 / 8	Loss	4–6, 2–6
Cincinnati Open; Mason, United States; WTA 1000; Hard, outdoor; 16 August 2021 – 22 August 2021; Partner: (United States) Bethanie Mattek-Sands	13	1R	(United States) Shelby Rogers / (Croatia) Petra Martić	72 / 100	Win	2–6, 7–5, [10–5]
Cincinnati Open; Mason, United States; WTA 1000; Hard, outdoor; 16 August 2021 – 22 August 2021; Partner: (United States) Bethanie Mattek-Sands	14	2R	(Croatia) Darija Jurak Schreiber / (Slovenia) Andreja Klepač (8)	16 / 27	Win	2–6, 6–1, [10–3]
Cincinnati Open; Mason, United States; WTA 1000; Hard, outdoor; 16 August 2021 – 22 August 2021; Partner: (United States) Bethanie Mattek-Sands	15	QF	(Czech Republic) Barbora Krejčíková / (Czech Republic) Kateřina Siniaková (2)	4 / 6	Loss	4–6, 3–6
Indian Wells Open; Indian Wells, United States; WTA 1000; Hard, outdoor; 4 October 2021 – 17 October 2021; Partner: (United States) Bethanie Mattek-Sands	16	1R	(Germany) Julia Lohoff / (Russia) Alexandra Panova (PR)	71 / 146	Win	6–1, 6–3
Indian Wells Open; Indian Wells, United States; WTA 1000; Hard, outdoor; 4 October 2021 – 17 October 2021; Partner: (United States) Bethanie Mattek-Sands	17	2R	(Belgium) Elise Mertens / (Chinese Taipei) Hsieh Su-wei (2)	3 / 4	Loss	6–1, 4–6, [8–10]

=== Mixed doubles matches ===
Tournament	Match	Round	Opponent	Combined Rank	Result	Score
Australian Open; Melbourne, Australia; Grand Slam; Hard, outdoor; 8 February 2021 – 21 February 2021; Partner: (Poland) Łukasz Kubot	1	1R	(Australia) Astra Sharma / (Australia) John-Patrick Smith (WC)	234	Win	5–7, 7–6^{(8–6)}, [10–6]
Australian Open; Melbourne, Australia; Grand Slam; Hard, outdoor; 8 February 2021 – 21 February 2021; Partner: (Poland) Łukasz Kubot	2	2R	(United States) Hayley Carter / (Belgium) Sander Gillé (Alt)	118	Loss	4–6, 1–6
Summer Olympics; Tokyo, Japan; Olympic Games; Hard, outdoor; 28 July 2021 – 1 August 2021; Partner: (Poland) Łukasz Kubot	3	1R	(France) Fiona Ferro / (France) Pierre-Hugues Herbert (Alt)	56	Win	6–3, 7–6^{(7–3)}
Summer Olympics; Tokyo, Japan; Olympic Games; Hard, outdoor; 28 July 2021 – 1 August 2021; Partner: (Poland) Łukasz Kubot	4	QF	(Russia) Elena Vesnina / (Russia) Aslan Karatsev (2)	25	Loss	4–6, 4–6

== Tournament schedule ==
=== Singles schedule ===
Date	Tournament	Location	Category	Surface	Previous result	Previous points	New points	Outcome
1 February 2021 – 7 February 2021	Gippsland Trophy	Australia	WTA 500	Hard	Not held	0	55	Third round lost to (Russia) Ekaterina Alexandrova; 4–6, 2–6
8 February 2021 – 21 February 2021	Australian Open	Australia	Grand Slam	Hard	Fourth round	240	240	Fourth round lost to (Romania) Simona Halep; 6–3, 1–6, 4–6
22 February 2021 – 28 February 2021	Adelaide International	Australia	WTA 500	Hard	Did not play	0	470	Winner defeated (Switzerland) Belinda Bencic; 6–2, 6–2
8 March 2021 – 14 March 2021	Dubai Tennis Championships	United Arab Emirates	WTA 1000	Hard	Did not play	0	105	Third round lost to (Spain) Garbiñe Muguruza; 0–6, 4–6
22 March 2021 – 4 April 2021	Miami Open	United States	WTA 1000	Hard	Qualifying round two	20	65	Third round lost to (Croatia) Ana Konjuh; 4–6, 6–2, 2–6
26 April 2021 – 9 May 2021	Madrid Open	Spain	WTA 1000	Clay	Did not play	0	120	Third round lost to (Australia) Ashleigh Barty; 5–7, 4–6
10 May 2021 – 16 May 2021	Italian Open	Italy	WTA 1000	Clay	First round	1	900	Winner defeated (Czech Republic) Karolína Plíšková; 6–0, 6–0
31 May 2021 – 13 June 2021	French Open	France	Grand Slam	Clay	Winner	2000	430	Quarterfinals lost to (Greece) Maria Sakkari; 4–6, 4–6
21 June 2021 – 27 June 2021	Eastbourne International	Great Britain	WTA 500	Grass	Qualifying round one	1	55	Second round lost to (Russia) Daria Kasatkina; 6–4, 0–6, 1–6
28 June 2021 – 12 July 2021	Wimbledon Championships	Great Britain	Grand Slam	Grass	Fourth round	10	240	Fourth round lost to (Tunisia) Ons Jabeur; 7–5, 1–6, 1–6
24 July 2021 – 31 July 2021	Summer Olympics	Japan	Olympic Games	Hard	Did not play	0	0	Second round lost to (Spain) Paula Badosa; 3–6, 6–7^{(4–7)}
16 August 2021 – 22 August 2021	Cincinnati Open	United States	WTA 1000	Hard	First round	1	1	Second round lost to (Tunisia) Ons Jabeur; 3–6, 3–6
30 August 2021 – 12 September 2021	US Open	United States	Grand Slam	Hard	Third round	130	240	Fourth round lost to (Switzerland) Belinda Bencic; 6–7^{(12–14)}, 3–6
20 September 2021 – 26 September 2021	Ostrava Open	Czech Republic	WTA 500	Hard (i)	Did not play	0	185	Semifinals lost to (Greece) Maria Sakkari; 4–6, 5–7
4 October 2021 – 17 October 2021	Indian Wells Open	United States	WTA 1000	Hard	Qualifying round two	20	120	Fourth round lost to (Latvia) Jeļena Ostapenko; 4–6, 3–6
10 November 2021 – 17 November 2021	WTA Finals	Mexico	WTA Finals	Hard	Did not qualify	0	500	Failed to advance into the semifinals 1 won & 2 losses
Total year-end points							3786	

=== Doubles schedule ===
Date	Tournament	Location	Category	Surface	Previous result	Previous points	New points	Outcome
22 March 2021 – 4 April 2021	Miami Open	United States	WTA 1000	Hard	Did not play	0	390	Semifinals lost to (Japan) Shuko Aoyama / (Japan) Ena Shibahara; 6–3, 6–7^{(4–7)}, [2–10]
26 April 2021 – 9 May 2021	Madrid Open	Spain	WTA 1000	Clay	Did not play	0	120	Second round lost to (Russia) Vera Zvonareva / (Russia) Elena Vesnina; 6–4, 3–6, [5–10]
31 May 2021 – 13 June 2021	French Open	France	Grand Slam	Clay	Semifinals	780	1300	Final lost to (Czech Republic) Barbora Krejčíková / (Czech Republic) Kateřina Siniaková; 4–6, 2–6
16 August 2021 – 22 August 2021	Cincinnati Open	United States	WTA 1000	Hard	Semifinals	350	190	Quarterfinals lost to (Czech Republic) Barbora Krejčíková / (Czech Republic) Kateřina Siniaková; 4–6, 3–6
4 October 2021 – 17 October 2021	Indian Wells Open	United States	WTA 1000	Hard	Did not play	0	120	Second round lost to (Belgium) Elise Mertens / (Chinese Taipei) Hsieh Su-wei; 6–1, 4–6, [8–10]
Total year-end points							2120	

=== Mixed doubles schedule ===
Date	Tournament	Location	Category	Surface	Previous result	Outcome
8 February 2021 – 21 February 2021	Australian Open	Australia	Grand Slam	Hard	Quarterfinals	Second round lost to (United States) Hayley Carter / (Belgium) Sander Gillé; 4–6, 1–6
28 July 2021 – 1 August 2021	Summer Olympics	Japan	Olympic Games	Hard	Did not play	Quarterfinals lost to (Russia) Elena Vesnina / (Russia) Aslan Karatsev; 4–6, 4–6

== Yearly records ==
=== Top 10 wins ===
==== Singles ====
#	Opponent	Rank	Tournament	Surface	Round	Score	IŚR
1.	(Ukraine) Elina Svitolina	No. 6	Italian Open	Clay	Quarterfinals	6–2, 7–5	No. 15
2.	(Czech Republic) Karolína Plíšková	No. 9	Italian Open	Clay	Final	6–0, 6–0	No. 15
3.	(Spain) Paula Badosa	No. 10	WTA Finals, Mexico	Hard	Round robin	7–5, 6–4	No. 9

==== Doubles ====
#	Partner	Opponents	Rank	Tournament	Surface	Round	Score	IŚR
1.	(United States) Bethanie Mattek-Sands	(China) Xu Yifan; (China) Zhang Shuai	No. 9; No. 30	Miami Open, United States	Hard	Second round	6–3, 6–1	No. 81
2.	(United States) Bethanie Mattek-Sands	(Belgium) Elise Mertens; (Chinese Taipei) Hsieh Su-wei	No. 2; No. 3	French Open	Clay	Third round	5–7, 6–4, 7–5	No. 59

=== Finals ===
==== Singles: 2 (2 titles) ====
Legend Grand Slam tournaments (0–0) WTA Tour Championships (0–0) WTA Elite Trophy (0–0) WTA 1000 (1–0) WTA 500 (1–0) WTA 250 (0–0)	Finals by surface Hard (1–0) Clay (1–0) Grass (0–0)	Finals by setting Outdoor (2–0) Indoor (0–0)

Result	W–L	Date	Tournament	Tier	Surface	Opponent	Score
Win	1–0	Feb 2021	Adelaide International, Australia	WTA 500	Hard	(Switzerland) Belinda Bencic	6–2, 6–2
Win	2–0	May 2021	Italian Open	WTA 1000	Clay	(Czech Republic) Karolína Plíšková	6–0, 6–0

==== Doubles: 1 (1 runner-up) ====
Legend Grand Slam tournaments (0–1) WTA Tour Championships (0–0) WTA Elite Trophy (0–0) WTA 1000 (0–0) WTA 500 (0–0) WTA 250 (0–0)	Finals by surface Hard (0–0) Clay (0–1) Grass (0–0)	Finals by setting Outdoor (0–1) Indoor (0–0)

Result	W–L	Date	Tournament	Tier	Surface	Partner	Opponent	Score
Loss	0–1	Jun 2021	French Open, France	Grand Slam	Clay	(United States) Bethanie Mattek-Sands	(Czech Republic) Barbora Krejčíková; (Czech Republic) Kateřina Siniaková	4–6, 2–6

=== Earnings ===
#	Tournament	Singles Prize money	Doubles Prize money	Mixed doubles Prize money	Year-to-date
1.	Gippsland Trophy	$5,500	$0	$0	$5,500
2.	Australian Open	$219,367	$0	$4,113	$228,980
3.	Adelaide International	$68,570	$0	$0	$297,550
4.	Dubai Tennis Championships	$21,000	$0	$0	$318,550
5.	Miami Open	$26,000	$19,000	$0	$363,550
6.	Madrid Open	$42,220	$8,562	$0	$414,332
7.	Italian Open	$221,500	$0	$0	$635,832
8.	French Open	$300,912	$85,007	$0	$1,021,751
9.	Eastbourne International	$7,425	$0	$0	$1,029,176
10.	Wimbledon Championships	$245,545	$0	$0	$1,274,721
11.	Cincinnati Open	$15,330	$7,950	$0	$1,298,001
12.	US Open	$265,000	$0	$0	$1,563,001
13.	Ostrava Open	$32,400	$0	$0	$1,595,401
14.	Indian Wells Open	$92,000	$15,750	$0	$1,703,151
15.	WTA Finals	$220,000	$0	$0	$1,923,151
Total prize money		1,782,769	$136,269	$4,113	$1,923,151
