= 2021 Dubai Tennis Championships – Women's doubles =

Women's doubles
- 2021 Dubai Tennis Championships

Final
- Champions: (Chile) Alexa Guarachi (Croatia) Darija Jurak
- Runners-up: (China) Xu Yifan (China) Yang Zhaoxuan
- Score: 6–0, 6–3

Events
Singles	men	women
Doubles	men	women
- Dubai Tennis Championships

Hsieh Su-wei and Barbora Strýcová were the two-time defending champions, but they chose not to participate.

Alexa Guarachi and Darija Jurak won the title, defeating Xu Yifan and Yang Zhaoxuan in the final, 6–0, 6–3.

== Seeds ==
1. (Belgium) Elise Mertens / (Belarus) Aryna Sabalenka (second round)
2. (Czech Republic) Barbora Krejčíková / (Czech Republic) Kateřina Siniaková (quarterfinals)
3. (United States) Nicole Melichar / (Netherlands) Demi Schuurs (quarterfinals)
4. (Japan) Shuko Aoyama / (Japan) Ena Shibahara (second round)
5. (Hungary) Tímea Babos / (Russia) Veronika Kudermetova (semifinals)
6. (Canada) Gabriela Dabrowski / (United States) Coco Gauff (first round)
7. (United States) Hayley Carter / (Brazil) Luisa Stefani (quarterfinals)
8. (Chile) Alexa Guarachi / (Croatia) Darija Jurak (champions)

== Draw ==
Key

- Q = Qualifier
- WC = Wild card
- LL = Lucky loser
- Alt = Alternate
- ITF = ITF entry
- PR = Protected ranking
- SR = Special ranking
- SE = Special exempt
- JE = Junior exempt
- JR = Junior Accelerator Programme entrant
- CO = College Accelerator Programme entrant
- NG = Next Gen Accelerator Program entrant
- w/o = Walkover
- r = Retired
- d = Defaulted

=== Finals ===
Semifinals
(United States) Bethanie Mattek-Sands (United States) Jessica Pegula	4	3
8	(Chile) Alexa Guarachi (Croatia) Darija Jurak	6	6
(China) Xu Yifan (China) Yang Zhaoxuan	6	7
5	(Hungary) Tímea Babos (Russia) Veronika Kudermetova	3	5

Final
8	(Chile) Alexa Guarachi (Croatia) Darija Jurak	6	6
(China) Xu Yifan (China) Yang Zhaoxuan	0	3

=== Top half ===
First round
(United States) B Mattek-Sands (United States) J Pegula	6	7^{7}
(Japan) M Ninomiya (Czech Republic) R Voráčová	4	6^{3}
PR	(Slovenia) A Klepač (India) S Mirza	6	6
(United States) S Rogers (China) S Zheng	1	3
WC	(United Kingdom) E Silva (Netherlands) R van der Hoek	1	2
7	(United States) H Carter (Brazil) L Stefani	6	6
(Netherlands) K Bertens (Netherlands) L Pattinama Kerkhove	6	5	[10]
(United States) K Christian (United States) S Santamaria	4	7	[5]
(Romania) M Niculescu (Russia) A Potapova	6^{1}	6	[10]
(Georgia (country)) O Kalashnikova (Belarus) L Marozava	7^{7}	0	[6]
WC	(Kuwait) S Behbehani (Turkey) Ç Büyükakçay	0	1
8	(Chile) A Guarachi (Croatia) D Jurak	6	6

Second round
1	(Belgium) E Mertens (Belarus) A Sabalenka	6	6^{2}	[6]
(United States) B Mattek-Sands (United States) J Pegula	3	7^{7}	[10]
PR	(Slovenia) A Klepač (India) S Mirza	3	3
7	(United States) H Carter (Brazil) L Stefani	6	6
3	(United States) N Melichar (Netherlands) D Schuurs	6	6
(Netherlands) K Bertens (Netherlands) L Pattinama Kerkhove	3	2
(Romania) M Niculescu (Russia) A Potapova	1	0^{r}
8	(Chile) A Guarachi (Croatia) D Jurak	6	0

Quarterfinals
(United States) B Mattek-Sands (United States) J Pegula	6	6
7	(United States) H Carter (Brazil) L Stefani	4	2
3	(United States) N Melichar (Netherlands) D Schuurs	3	6	[3]
8	(Chile) A Guarachi (Croatia) D Jurak	6	4	[10]

Semifinals
(United States) B Mattek-Sands (United States) J Pegula	4	3
8	(Chile) A Guarachi (Croatia) D Jurak	6	6

=== Bottom half ===
First round
6	(Canada) G Dabrowski (United States) C Gauff	6	2	[8]
(Germany) L Siegemund (Russia) V Zvonareva	2	6	[10]
(Switzerland) B Bencic (Czech Republic) L Hradecká	6	4	[8]
(Ukraine) L Kichenok (Latvia) J Ostapenko	4	6	[10]
(China) Y Xu (China) Z Yang	6	6
PR	(Russia) N Dzalamidze (Sweden) C Lister	3	0
5	(Hungary) T Babos (Russia) V Kudermetova	6	6
PR	(Serbia) A Krunić (Russia) A Panova	3	3
PR	(Kazakhstan) E Rybakina (Kazakhstan) Y Shvedova	4	2
(Czech Republic) Ka Plíšková (Czech Republic) Kr Plíšková	6	6
(Russia) A Pavlyuchenkova (Australia) Ar Rodionova	6	2	[5]
(Ukraine) N Kichenok (Romania) R Olaru	4	6	[10]

Second round
(Germany) L Siegemund (Russia) V Zvonareva	3	6	[6]
(Ukraine) L Kichenok (Latvia) J Ostapenko	6	2	[10]
(China) Y Xu (China) Z Yang	7^{9}	7
4	(Japan) S Aoyama (Japan) E Shibahara	6^{7}	5
5	(Hungary) T Babos (Russia) V Kudermetova	6	6
(Czech Republic) Ka Plíšková (Czech Republic) Kr Plíšková	2	4
(Ukraine) N Kichenok (Romania) R Olaru	7	4	[6]
2	(Czech Republic) B Krejčíková (Czech Republic) K Siniaková	5	6	[10]

Quarterfinals
(Ukraine) L Kichenok (Latvia) J Ostapenko	2	6	[7]
(China) Y Xu (China) Z Yang	6	3	[10]
5	(Hungary) T Babos (Russia) V Kudermetova	6	7
2	(Czech Republic) B Krejčíková (Czech Republic) K Siniaková	3	5

Semifinals
(China) Y Xu (China) Z Yang	6	7
5	(Hungary) T Babos (Russia) V Kudermetova	3	5
