= 2020 J&T Banka Ostrava Open =

- Date: 19–25 October
- Edition: 1st
- Category: Premier
- Draw: 28S / 28Q / 16D
- Prize money: $528,500
- Surface: Hard / indoor
- Location: Ostrava, Czech Republic

Champions

Singles
- (Belarus) Aryna Sabalenka

Doubles
- (Belgium) Elise Mertens / (Belarus) Aryna Sabalenka
- Ostrava Open

The 2020 J&T Banka Ostrava Open is a WTA tournament organised for female professional tennis players, held in Ostrava, Czech Republic, in mid-October 2020 on indoor hard courts. It was primarily organised due to the cancellation of many tournaments during the 2020 season, because of the ongoing COVID-19 pandemic. The tournament attracted four top-20 players, including two-time grand slam champion and former world no. 1 Victoria Azarenka.

== Singles main draw entrants ==
=== Seeds ===
Country	Player	Rank^{1}	Seed
UKR	Elina Svitolina	5	1
CZE	Karolína Plíšková	6	2
BLR	Aryna Sabalenka	12	3
BLR	Victoria Azarenka	14	4
CRO	Petra Martić	18	5
KAZ	Elena Rybakina	19	6
BEL	Elise Mertens	21	7
EST	Anett Kontaveit	22	8

- Rankings are as of October 12, 2020.

=== Other entrants ===
The following players received wildcards into the singles main draw:

- (Latvia) Jeļena Ostapenko
- (Czech Republic) Kristýna Plíšková
- (Czech Republic) Kateřina Siniaková

The following players received entry from the qualifying draw:

- (United States) Coco Gauff
- (Russia) Daria Kasatkina
- (Czech Republic) Barbora Krejčíková
- (Russia) Veronika Kudermetova
- (Czech Republic) Tereza Martincová
- (Spain) Sara Sorribes Tormo

=== Withdrawals ===
Before the tournament

- (Netherlands) Kiki Bertens → replaced by (United States) Amanda Anisimova
- (United States) Sofia Kenin → replaced by (Russia) Ekaterina Alexandrova
- (Germany) Angelique Kerber → replaced by (Czech Republic) Karolína Muchová
- (United States) Madison Keys → replaced by (Croatia) Donna Vekić
- (United Kingdom) Johanna Konta → replaced by (Tunisia) Ons Jabeur
- (Czech Republic) Petra Kvitová → replaced by (Poland) Magda Linette
- (Spain) Garbiñe Muguruza → replaced by (Ukraine) Dayana Yastremska
- (United States) Alison Riske → replaced by (United States) Jennifer Brady
- (Czech Republic) Markéta Vondroušová → replaced by (Czech Republic) Barbora Strýcová

== Doubles main draw entrants ==
=== Seeds ===
Country	Player	Country	Player	Rank^{1}	Seed
BEL	Elise Mertens	BLR	Aryna Sabalenka	11	1
CZE	Barbora Krejčíková	CZE	Kateřina Siniaková	15	2
USA	Bethanie Mattek-Sands	CZE	Barbora Strýcová	22	3
BEL	Kirsten Flipkens	NED	Demi Schuurs	44	4

- ^{1} Rankings as of October 12, 2020.

=== Other entrants ===
The following pair received a wildcard into the doubles main draw:

- (Czech Republic) Jesika Malečková / (Slovakia) Chantal Škamlová

=== Withdrawals ===
During the tournament

- (Russia) Anna Blinkova
- (Czech Republic) Barbora Krejčíková

== Finals ==
All dates and times are CEST (UTC+2) to 24 October and CET (UTC+1) from 25 October

=== Singles ===
- (Belarus) Aryna Sabalenka def. (Belarus) Victoria Azarenka, 6–2, 6–2.

It was Sabalenka's 7th WTA singles title, and second of the year. This was the first WTA singles final in history to be completed between two Belarusian players.

=== Doubles ===
- (Belgium) Elise Mertens / (Belarus) Aryna Sabalenka def. (Canada) Gabriela Dabrowski / (Brazil) Luisa Stefani, 6–1, 6–3.

This was Mertens' 10th WTA doubles title, and first of the year, and was Sabalenka's 4th WTA doubles title, and first of the year. This was their 4th WTA doubles title as a pair.
