= 2020 J&T Banka Ostrava Open – Doubles =

Doubles
- 2020 J&T Banka Ostrava Open

Final
- Champions: (Belgium) Elise Mertens (Belarus) Aryna Sabalenka
- Runners-up: (Canada) Gabriela Dabrowski (Brazil) Luisa Stefani
- Score: 6–1, 6–3

Events
Singles	Doubles
← 1999 ·	Ostrava Open	· 2021 →

This was the first edition of the tournament.

Elise Mertens and Aryna Sabalenka won the title, defeating Gabriela Dabrowski and Luisa Stefani in the final, 6–1, 6–3.

== Seeds ==
1. (Belgium) Elise Mertens / (Belarus) Aryna Sabalenka (champions)
2. (Czech Republic) Barbora Krejčíková / (Czech Republic) Kateřina Siniaková (semifinals, withdrew)
3. (United States) Bethanie Mattek-Sands / (Czech Republic) Barbora Strýcová (quarterfinals)
4. (Belgium) Kirsten Flipkens / (Netherlands) Demi Schuurs (semifinals)

== Draw ==
=== Key ===
- Q = Qualifier
- WC = Wild card
- LL = Lucky loser
- Alt = Alternate
- SE = Special exempt
- PR = Protected ranking
- ITF = ITF entry
- JE = Junior exempt
- w/o = Walkover
- r = Retired
- d = Defaulted
- SR = Special ranking

=== Draw ===
First round
1	(Belgium) E Mertens (Belarus) A Sabalenka	5	6	[10]
WC	(Czech Republic) J Malečková (Slovakia) C Škamlová	7	1	[5]
(Latvia) J Ostapenko (Russia) V Zvonareva	1	6	[10]
(Belarus) V Azarenka (Czech Republic) K Muchová	6	4	[4]
4	(Belgium) K Flipkens (Netherlands) D Schuurs	6	7
(Czech Republic) L Hradecká (Slovenia) A Klepač	1	5
(Ukraine) N Kichenok (Romania) M Niculescu	7	6^{3}	[10]
(Germany) A-L Friedsam (Romania) R Olaru	5	7^{7}	[5]
(Canada) G Dabrowski (Brazil) L Stefani	6	6
(Kazakhstan) E Rybakina (Ukraine) D Yastremska	4	2
(Ukraine) L Kichenok (China) S Zhang	5	3
3	(United States) B Mattek-Sands (Czech Republic) B Strýcová	7	6
(Russia) A Blinkova (Russia) V Kudermetova
(Poland) M Linette (Switzerland) J Teichmann	w/o
(Sweden) C Lister (Czech Republic) R Voráčová	4	0
2	(Czech Republic) B Krejčíková (Czech Republic) K Siniaková	6	6

Quarterfinals
1	(Belgium) E Mertens (Belarus) A Sabalenka	7^{7}	5	[10]
(Latvia) J Ostapenko (Russia) V Zvonareva	6^{5}	7	[8]
4	(Belgium) K Flipkens (Netherlands) D Schuurs	6	7^{7}
(Ukraine) N Kichenok (Romania) M Niculescu	4	6^{3}
(Canada) G Dabrowski (Brazil) L Stefani	6	7^{7}
3	(United States) B Mattek-Sands (Czech Republic) B Strýcová	4	6^{4}
(Poland) M Linette (Switzerland) J Teichmann	4	6	[5]
2	(Czech Republic) B Krejčíková (Czech Republic) K Siniaková	6	2	[10]

Semifinals
1	(Belgium) E Mertens (Belarus) A Sabalenka	6	7
4	(Belgium) K Flipkens (Netherlands) D Schuurs	3	5
(Canada) G Dabrowski (Brazil) L Stefani	w/o
2	(Czech Republic) B Krejčíková (Czech Republic) K Siniaková

Final
1	(Belgium) E Mertens (Belarus) A Sabalenka	6	6
(Canada) G Dabrowski (Brazil) L Stefani	1	3
