= 2021 Dubai Tennis Championships – Men's singles =

Men's singles
- 2021 Dubai Tennis Championships

Final
- Champion: (Russia) Aslan Karatsev
- Runner-up: (South Africa) Lloyd Harris
- Score: 6–3, 6–2

Details
- Draw: 48 (6 Q / 4 WC )
- Seeds: 16

Events
Singles	men	women
Doubles	men	women
- Dubai Tennis Championships

Aslan Karatsev defeated Lloyd Harris in the final, 6–3, 6–2 to win the men's singles tennis title at the 2021 Dubai Tennis Championships. It was his first ATP Tour singles title. Karatsev was the second wildcard in the tournament's history to win the men's singles title.

Novak Djokovic was the reigning champion, but chose not to participate this year.

== Seeds ==
All seeds receive a bye into the second round.

1. (Austria) Dominic Thiem (second round)
2. (Russia) Andrey Rublev (semifinals)
3. (Canada) Denis Shapovalov (semifinals)
4. (Spain) Roberto Bautista Agut (third round)
5. (Belgium) David Goffin (second round)
6. (Spain) Pablo Carreño Busta (second round)
7. (Switzerland) Stan Wawrinka (withdrew)
8. (Russia) Karen Khachanov (third round)
9. (Australia) Alex de Minaur (second round)
10. (Croatia) Borna Ćorić (withdrew)
11. (Serbia) Dušan Lajović (third round)
12. (United Kingdom) Dan Evans (second round)
13. (Poland) Hubert Hurkacz (third round)
14. (Serbia) Filip Krajinović (third round)
15. (United States) Taylor Fritz (third round)
16. (Italy) Jannik Sinner (quarterfinals)
17. (Italy) Lorenzo Sonego (third round)

The players who also received a bye into the second round were as follows, each semifinalist from Doha or Marseille:

- (Georgia (country)) Nikoloz Basilashvili
- (Australia) Matthew Ebden

The other six byes were removed, and six players were added to the main draw.

== Draw ==
Key

- Q = Qualifier
- WC = Wild card
- LL = Lucky loser
- Alt = Alternate
- ITF = ITF entry
- PR = Protected ranking
- SR = Special ranking
- SE = Special exempt
- JE = Junior exempt
- JR = Junior Accelerator Programme entrant
- CO = College Accelerator Programme entrant
- NG = Next Gen Accelerator Program entrant
- w/o = Walkover
- r = Retired
- d = Defaulted

=== Finals ===
Quarterfinals
Q	(South Africa) Lloyd Harris	6	3	6
(Japan) Kei Nishikori	1	6	3
3	(Canada) Denis Shapovalov	7	6
(France) Jérémy Chardy	5	4
WC	(Russia) Aslan Karatsev	6^{5}	6	6
16	(Italy) Jannik Sinner	7^{7}	3	2
(Hungary) Márton Fucsovics	5	2
2	(Russia) Andrey Rublev	7	6

Semifinals
Q	(South Africa) Lloyd Harris	6^{5}	6	7^{8}
3	(Canada) Denis Shapovalov	7^{7}	4	6^{6}
WC	(Russia) Aslan Karatsev	6	4	6
2	(Russia) Andrey Rublev	2	6	4

Final
Q	(South Africa) Lloyd Harris	3	2
WC	(Russia) Aslan Karatsev	6	6

=== Top half ===
==== Section 1 ====
First round
Q	(Australia) C O'Connell	7^{7}	4	1
Q	(South Africa) L Harris	6^{5}	6	6
(Spain) A Davidovich Fokina	6	6
LL	(Moldova) R Albot	4	4
Q	(India) Y Bhambri	6	1	4
(Slovenia) A Bedene	3	6	6
(Japan) K Nishikori	3	6	6
(United States) R Opelka	6	3	4

Second round
1	(Austria) D Thiem	3	4
Q	(South Africa) L Harris	6	6
(Spain) A Davidovich Fokina	5	4
14	(Serbia) F Krajinović	7	6
LL	(Italy) L Giustino	4	3
(Slovenia) A Bedene	6	6
(Japan) K Nishikori	6	7^{7}
5	(Belgium) D Goffin	3	6^{3}

Third round
Q	(South Africa) L Harris	7^{7}	6
14	(Serbia) F Krajinović	6^{5}	4
(Slovenia) A Bedene	4	4
(Japan) K Nishikori	6	6

Quarterfinals
Q	(South Africa) L Harris	6	3	6
(Japan) K Nishikori	1	6	3

==== Section 2 ====
First round
(Germany) J-L Struff	6	6
Q	(Kazakhstan) M Kukushkin	3	2
(France) R Gasquet	6	6
(Italy) M Cecchinato	4	2
(France) J Chardy	6	3	6
(Spain) A Ramos Viñolas	3	6	4
WC	(Australia) A Popyrin	7^{7}	7
WC	(Austria) D Novak	6^{3}	5

Second round
3	(Canada) D Shapovalov	6	6
(Germany) J-L Struff	1	3
(France) R Gasquet	3	4
13	(Poland) H Hurkacz	6	6
9	(Australia) A de Minaur	6	3	4
(France) J Chardy	2	6	6
WC	(Australia) A Popyrin	4	6	6^{4}
8	(Russia) K Khachanov	6	3	7^{7}

Third round
3	(Canada) D Shapovalov	6	6
13	(Poland) H Hurkacz	4	3
(France) J Chardy	6^{3}	6	6
8	(Russia) K Khachanov	7^{7}	4	4

Quarterfinals
3	(Canada) D Shapovalov	7	6
(France) J Chardy	5	4

=== Bottom half ===
==== Section 3 ====
First round
Q	(Spain) B Zapata Miralles	6	6
(Australia) J Millman	4	4
WC	(Russia) A Karatsev	6	6
(Belarus) E Gerasimov	4	4
(Japan) Y Nishioka	4	6^{4}
(Kazakhstan) A Bublik	6	7^{7}

Second round
17	(Italy) L Sonego	6	6
Q	(Spain) B Zapata Miralles	2	2
WC	(Russia) A Karatsev	6	4	6
12	(United Kingdom) D Evans	4	6	4
16	(Italy) J Sinner	2	7^{7}	6
(Kazakhstan) A Bublik	6	6^{2}	4
SE	(Australia) M Ebden	1^{r}
4	(Spain) R Bautista Agut	4

Third round
17	(Italy) L Sonego	6	3	4
WC	(Russia) A Karatsev	3	6	6
16	(Italy) J Sinner	6	3	7
4	(Spain) R Bautista Agut	4	6	5

Quarterfinals
WC	(Russia) A Karatsev	6^{5}	6	6
16	(Italy) J Sinner	7^{7}	3	2

==== Section 4 ====
First round
(Canada) V Pospisil	6	5	4
(Hungary) M Fucsovics	2	7	6
WC	(Tunisia) M Jaziri	3
(France) J-W Tsonga	3^{r}
Q	(Finland) E Ruusuvuori	6	7^{7}
(Australia) J Thompson	3	6^{5}

Second round
6	(Spain) P Carreño Busta	7^{7}	3	2
(Hungary) M Fucsovics	6^{5}	6	6
WC	(Tunisia) M Jaziri	5	2
11	(Serbia) D Lajović	7	6
15	(United States) T Fritz	4	6	7^{7}
(Georgia (country)) N Basilashvili	6	3	6^{4}
Q	(Finland) E Ruusuvuori	4	4
2	(Russia) A Rublev	6	6

Third round
(Hungary) M Fucsovics	6	4	6
11	(Serbia) D Lajović	1	6	4
15	(United States) T Fritz	3	1
2	(Russia) A Rublev	6	6

Quarterfinals
(Hungary) M Fucsovics	5	2
2	(Russia) A Rublev	7	6

== Qualifying ==
=== Seeds ===
1. (Moldova) Radu Albot (qualifying competition, lucky loser)
2. (South Africa) Lloyd Harris (qualified)
3. (Finland) Emil Ruusuvuori (qualified)
4. (Kazakhstan) Mikhail Kukushkin (qualified)
5. (Australia) Christopher O'Connell (qualified)
6. (Russia) Evgeny Donskoy (first round)
7. (India) Prajnesh Gunneswaran (first round)
8. (Australia) Marc Polmans (first round)
9. (Spain) Bernabé Zapata Miralles (qualified)
10. (Italy) Lorenzo Giustino (qualifying competition, lucky loser)
11. (Slovenia) Blaž Rola (qualifying competition)
12. (Italy) Thomas Fabbiano (qualifying competition)

=== Qualifiers ===
1. (Spain) Bernabé Zapata Miralles
2. (South Africa) Lloyd Harris
3. (Finland) Emil Ruusuvuori
4. (Kazakhstan) Mikhail Kukushkin
5. (Australia) Christopher O'Connell
6. (India) Yuki Bhambri

=== Lucky losers ===
1. (Moldova) Radu Albot
2. (Italy) Lorenzo Giustino

=== Qualifying draw ===
==== First qualifier ====
First round
1	(Moldova) Radu Albot	3	6	6
(Slovakia) Lukáš Lacko	6	4	4
WC	(United Arab Emirates) Omar Alawadhi	0	0
9	(Spain) Bernabé Zapata Miralles	6	6

Qualifying competition
1	(Moldova) Radu Albot	6	5	4
9	(Spain) Bernabé Zapata Miralles	2	7	6

==== Second qualifier ====
First round
2	(South Africa) Lloyd Harris	6	6
(Russia) Teymuraz Gabashvili	1	2
(Kazakhstan) Dmitry Popko	3	6	6^{12}
11	(Slovenia) Blaž Rola	6	4	7^{14}

Qualifying competition
2	(South Africa) Lloyd Harris	6	6
11	(Slovenia) Blaž Rola	2	4

==== Third qualifier ====
First round
3	(Finland) Emil Ruusuvuori	7^{7}	4	6
WC	(Bulgaria) Dimitar Kuzmanov	6^{4}	6	1
(Serbia) Viktor Troicki	7	6
8	(Australia) Marc Polmans	5	0

Qualifying competition
3	(Finland) Emil Ruusuvuori	6	6
(Serbia) Viktor Troicki	2	2

==== Fourth qualifier ====
First round
4	(Kazakhstan) Mikhail Kukushkin	7	3	6
(France) Maxime Janvier	5	6	1
Alt	(Italy) Andrea Vavassori	3	3
10	(Italy) Lorenzo Giustino	6	6

Qualifying competition
4	(Kazakhstan) Mikhail Kukushkin	6	6
10	(Italy) Lorenzo Giustino	2	2

==== Fifth qualifier ====
First round
5	(Australia) Christopher O'Connell	6	6
(Turkey) Cem İlkel	3	4
WC	(United Arab Emirates) Abdulrahman Al Janahi	1	2
12	(Italy) Thomas Fabbiano	6	6

Qualifying competition
5	(Australia) Christopher O'Connell	6	6
12	(Italy) Thomas Fabbiano	2	4

==== Sixth qualifier ====
First round
6	(Russia) Evgeny Donskoy	4	4
(India) Ramkumar Ramanathan	6	6
PR	(India) Yuki Bhambri	6	6
7	(India) Prajnesh Gunneswaran	1	4

Qualifying competition
(India) Ramkumar Ramanathan	5	7	2
PR	(India) Yuki Bhambri	7	5	6
