= 2021 J&T Banka Ostrava Open =

- Date: 20–26 September
- Edition: 2nd
- Category: WTA 500
- Draw: 28S / 24Q / 16D
- Prize money: $565,530
- Surface: Hard (Indoor)
- Location: Ostrava, Czech Republic

Champions

Singles
- (Estonia) Anett Kontaveit

Doubles
- (India) Sania Mirza / (China) Zhang Shuai
- Ostrava Open

The 2021 J&T Banka Ostrava Open was a WTA tournament organised for female professional tennis players on indoor hard courts. It was the 2nd edition of the event on the 2021 WTA Tour, primarily organised due to the cancellation of the Asian tournaments during the 2021 season, because of the ongoing COVID-19 pandemic. The event took place at the Ostravar Arena in Ostrava, Czech Republic, from 20 through 26 September 2021.

== Champions ==
=== Singles ===
- (Estonia) Anett Kontaveit def. (Greece) Maria Sakkari, 6–2, 7–5

=== Doubles ===
- (India) Sania Mirza / (China) Zhang Shuai def. (United States) Kaitlyn Christian / (New Zealand) Erin Routliffe 6–3, 6–2

== Singles main draw entrants ==
=== Seeds ===
Country	Player	Rank^{1}	Seed
POL	Iga Świątek	8	1
CZE	Petra Kvitová	10	2
SUI	Belinda Bencic	12	3
GRE	Maria Sakkari	13	4
RUS	Anastasia Pavlyuchenkova	14	5
GER	Angelique Kerber	15	6
KAZ	Elena Rybakina	17	7
~~CZE~~	~~Karolína Muchová~~	~~22~~	~~8~~
ESP	Paula Badosa	27	9

- Rankings are as of September 13, 2021.

=== Other entrants ===
The following players received wildcards into the singles main draw:

- (France) Caroline Garcia
- (Czech Republic) Tereza Martincová
- (Latvia) Jeļena Ostapenko
- (Czech Republic) Kateřina Siniaková

The following players received entry from the qualifying draw:

- (France) Océane Dodin
- (France) Fiona Ferro
- (Croatia) Ana Konjuh
- (Poland) Magda Linette
- (Russia) Anastasia Potapova
- (Russia) Anastasia Zakharova

The following players received entry as lucky losers:

- (Russia) Anna Blinkova
- (Russia) Varvara Gracheva

=== Withdrawals ===
Before the tournament

- (Czech Republic) Barbora Krejčíková → replaced by (China) Zhang Shuai
- (Belgium) Elise Mertens → replaced by (Russia) Varvara Gracheva
- (Croatia) Petra Martić → replaced by (Spain) Sara Sorribes Tormo
- (Czech Republic) Karolína Muchová → replaced by (Russia) Anna Blinkova
- (Czech Republic) Karolína Plíšková → replaced by (Switzerland) Jil Teichmann
- (Ukraine) Elina Svitolina → replaced by (Romania) Sorana Cîrstea

== Doubles main draw entrants ==
=== Seeds ===
Country	Player	Country	Player	Rank^{1}	Seed
POL	Magda Linette	USA	Bernarda Pera	115	1
IND	Sania Mirza	CHN	Zhang Shuai	129	2
USA	Kaitlyn Christian	NZL	Erin Routliffe	134	3
JPN	Eri Hozumi	JPN	Makoto Ninomiya	142	4

- ^{1} Rankings as of September 13, 2021.

=== Withdrawals ===
Before the tournament

- (Russia) Ekaterina Alexandrova / (Switzerland) Stefanie Vögele → replaced by (India) Rutuja Bhosale / (United Kingdom) Emily Webley-Smith
- (Russia) Natela Dzalamidze / (Russia) Kamilla Rakhimova → replaced by (Russia) Natela Dzalamidze / (Russia) Yana Sizikova
