= 2026 Ostrava Open – Singles =

Singles
- 2026 Ostrava Open

Final
- Champion: (United Kingdom) Katie Boulter
- Runner-up: (Germany) Tamara Korpatsch
- Score: 5–7, 6–2, 6–1

Details
- Draw: 30 (4 WC, 4 Q)
- Seeds: 8

Events
Singles	Doubles
- Ostrava Open

Katie Boulter defeated Tamara Korpatsch in the final, 5–7, 6–2, 6–1 to win the singles tennis title at the 2026 Ostrava Open. It was her fourth WTA Tour title.

Barbora Krejčíková was the reigning champion from when the event was last held in 2022, but she did not participate this year.

== Seeds ==
The top two seeds received a bye into the second round.

1. (Germany) Tatjana Maria (second round)
2. (Colombia) Emiliana Arango (second round)
3. Anna Blinkova (first round)
4. (Slovakia) Rebecca Šramková (second round)
5. (Switzerland) Viktorija Golubic (second round)
6. (United States) Caty McNally (quarterfinals)
7. (Japan) Moyuka Uchijima (first round)
8. (Hungary) Panna Udvardy (second round)

== Draw ==
Key

- Q = Qualifier
- WC = Wild card
- LL = Lucky loser
- Alt = Alternate
- ITF = ITF entry
- PR = Protected ranking
- SR = Special ranking
- SE = Special exempt
- JE = Junior exempt
- JR = Junior Accelerator Programme entrant
- CO = College Accelerator Programme entrant
- NG = Next Gen Accelerator Program entrant
- w/o = Walkover
- r = Retired
- d = Defaulted

=== Finals ===
Semifinals
(United States) Katie Volynets	1	3
(United Kingdom) Katie Boulter	6	6
(France) Diane Parry	4	4
(Germany) Tamara Korpatsch	6	6

Final
(United Kingdom) Katie Boulter	5	6	6
(Germany) Tamara Korpatsch	7	2	1

=== Top half ===
First round
(Poland) L Klimovičová	2	1
(United States) K Volynets	6	6
(United States) A Parks	7^{7}	6
(Austria) J Grabher	6^{3}	2
(Armenia) E Avanesyan	6	2	6
7	(Japan) M Uchijima	3	6	3
4	(Slovakia) R Šramková	6	6
Q	(Czech Republic) V Valdmannová	2	3
(Czech Republic) L Fruhvirtová	7^{7}	6
Q	(Germany) M Barthel	6^{4}	4
WC	(Czech Republic) L Havlíčková	4	6	1
(United Kingdom) K Boulter	6	3	6
(Austria) S Kraus	4	0
5	(Switzerland) V Golubic	6	6

Second round
1	(Germany) T Maria	5	1
(United States) K Volynets	7	6
(United States) A Parks	6	6
(Armenia) E Avanesyan	4	2
4	(Slovakia) R Šramková	3	1
(Czech Republic) L Fruhvirtová	6	6
(United Kingdom) K Boulter	6	6
5	(Switzerland) V Golubic	2	2

Quarterfinals
(United States) K Volynets	5	6	6
(United States) A Parks	7	4	2
(Czech Republic) L Fruhvirtová	3	2
(United Kingdom) K Boulter	6	6

Semifinals
(United States) K Volynets	1	3
(United Kingdom) K Boulter	6	6

=== Bottom half ===
First round
8	(Hungary) P Udvardy	7	6
WC	(Czech Republic) D Vidmanova	5	3
(France) D Parry	6	6
PR	(France) O Dodin	1	4
WC	(Czech Republic) B Fruhvirtová	1	1
Q	(France) F Ferro	6	6
(Czech Republic) N Bartůňková	6	6
3	A Blinkova	4	4
6	(United States) C McNally	6	7
(Netherlands) S Lamens	3	5
(Hungary) D Gálfi	6	3	5
WC	(Czech Republic) T Martincová	2	6	7
(Germany) T Korpatsch	6	6
Q	(Czech Republic) A Sisková	4	4

Second round
8	(Hungary) P Udvardy	1	2
(France) D Parry	6	6
Q	(France) F Ferro	4	6	1
(Czech Republic) N Bartůňková	6	3	6
6	(United States) C McNally	6	6
WC	(Czech Republic) T Martincová	4	4
(Germany) T Korpatsch	6	6
2	(Colombia) E Arango	3	4

Quarterfinals
(France) D Parry	6	6
(Czech Republic) N Bartůňková	1	3
6	(United States) C McNally	4	2
(Germany) T Korpatsch	6	6

Semifinals
(France) D Parry	4	4
(Germany) T Korpatsch	6	6

== Qualifying ==
=== Seeds ===
1. (Poland) Katarzyna Kawa (first round)
2. (Czech Republic) Dominika Šalková (first round)
3. (Germany) Anna-Lena Friedsam (first round)
4. (Czech Republic) Gabriela Knutson (qualifying competition)
5. (Brazil) Laura Pigossi (qualifying competition)
6. (Czech Republic) Laura Samson (first round, retired)
7. (Germany) Mona Barthel (qualified)
8. (Czech Republic) Barbora Palicová (first round)

=== Qualifiers ===
1. (Czech Republic) Anna Sisková
2. (France) Fiona Ferro
3. (Germany) Mona Barthel
4. (Czech Republic) Vendula Valdmannová

=== Qualifying draw ===
==== First qualifier ====
First round
1	(Poland) Katarzyna Kawa	6^{3}	3
(Switzerland) Susan Bandecchi	7^{7}	6
(Czech Republic) Anna Sisková	1	6	6
8	(Czech Republic) Barbora Palicová	6	0	3

Qualifying competition
(Switzerland) Susan Bandecchi	6	3	5
(Czech Republic) Anna Sisková	3	6	7

==== Second qualifier ====
First round
2	(Czech Republic) Dominika Šalková	4	4
PR	(France) Fiona Ferro	6	6
(Germany) Caroline Werner	5	7	6^{5}
5	(Brazil) Laura Pigossi	7	5	7^{7}

Qualifying competition
PR	(France) Fiona Ferro	6	6
5	(Brazil) Laura Pigossi	1	1

==== Third qualifier ====
First round
3	(Germany) Anna-Lena Friedsam	5	2
(Canada) Katherine Sebov	7	6
WC	(Czech Republic) Julie Paštiková	2	2
7	(Germany) Mona Barthel	6	6

Qualifying competition
(Canada) Katherine Sebov	2	7	4
7	(Germany) Mona Barthel	6	5	6

==== Fourth qualifier ====
First round
4	(Czech Republic) Gabriela Knutson	6	6
(Ukraine) Anastasiia Sobolieva	1	3
(Czech Republic) Vendula Valdmannová	7	3
6/WC	(Czech Republic) Laura Samson	5	1^{r}

Qualifying competition
4	(Czech Republic) Gabriela Knutson	2	7	4
(Czech Republic) Vendula Valdmannová	6	5	6
