= 2021 J&T Banka Ostrava Open – Doubles =

Doubles
- 2021 J&T Banka Ostrava Open

Final
- Champions: (India) Sania Mirza (China) Zhang Shuai
- Runners-up: (United States) Kaitlyn Christian (New Zealand) Erin Routliffe
- Score: 6–3, 6–2

Events
Singles	Doubles
← 2020 ·	Ostrava Open	· 2022 →

Elise Mertens and Aryna Sabalenka were the defending champions, but chose not to participate.

Sania Mirza and Zhang Shuai won the title, defeating Kaitlyn Christian and Erin Routliffe in the final, 6–3, 6–2.

== Seeds ==
1. (Poland) Magda Linette / (United States) Bernarda Pera (semifinals, withdrew)
2. (India) Sania Mirza / (China) Zhang Shuai (champions)
3. (United States) Kaitlyn Christian / (New Zealand) Erin Routliffe (final)
4. (Japan) Eri Hozumi / (Japan) Makoto Ninomiya (semifinals)

== Draw ==
=== Key ===
- Q = Qualifier
- WC = Wild card
- LL = Lucky loser
- Alt = Alternate
- SE = Special exempt
- PR = Protected ranking
- ITF = ITF entry
- JE = Junior exempt
- w/o = Walkover
- r = Retired
- d = Defaulted
- SR = Special ranking

=== Draw ===
First round
1	(Poland) M Linette (United States) B Pera	6	6
(Romania) A Mitu (Poland) A Rosolska	0	4
(Australia) A Sharma (Netherlands) R van der Hoek	7	7
(Russia) A Fomina-Klotz (Poland) K Kawa	5	5
3	(United States) K Christian (New Zealand) E Routliffe	6	6
Alt	(India) R Bhosale (United Kingdom) E Webley-Smith	3	4
(Russia) A Blinkova (Japan) M Doi	6	2	[13]
(Germany) V Heisen (Czech Republic) R Voráčová	1	6	[15]
(Georgia (country)) O Kalashnikova (Japan) M Kato	6	6
(Germany) J Lohoff (Russia) A Panova	1	2
(Poland) K Piter (Belgium) K Zimmermann	3	6	[6]
4	(Japan) E Hozumi (Japan) M Ninomiya	6	3	[10]
(Russia) N Dzalamidze (Russia) Y Sizikova	3	7^{7}	[6]
(Kazakhstan) A Danilina (Belarus) L Marozava	6	6^{3}	[10]
(United States) E Bektas (United Kingdom) T Moore	7^{7}	5	[7]
2	(India) S Mirza (China) S Zhang	6^{3}	7	[10]

Quarterfinals
1	(Poland) M Linette (United States) B Pera	6	6
(Australia) A Sharma (Netherlands) R van der Hoek	4	2
3	(United States) K Christian (New Zealand) E Routliffe	6	6
(Germany) V Heisen (Czech Republic) R Voráčová	3	2
(Georgia (country)) O Kalashnikova (Japan) M Kato	4	2
4	(Japan) E Hozumi (Japan) M Ninomiya	6	6
(Kazakhstan) A Danilina (Belarus) L Marozava	3	6	[6]
2	(India) S Mirza (China) S Zhang	6	3	[10]

Semifinals
1	(Poland) M Linette (United States) B Pera
3	(United States) K Christian (New Zealand) E Routliffe	w/o
4	(Japan) E Hozumi (Japan) M Ninomiya	2	5
2	(India) S Mirza (China) S Zhang	6	7

Final
3	(United States) K Christian (New Zealand) E Routliffe	3	2
2	(India) S Mirza (China) S Zhang	6	6
