= 2026 Ostrava Open – Doubles =

Doubles
- 2026 Ostrava Open

Final
- Champions: (Czech Republic) Anastasia Dețiuc (United States) Sabrina Santamaria
- Runners-up: (Czech Republic) Lucie Havlíčková (Czech Republic) Dominika Šalková
- Score: 6–4, 7–6^{(7–4)}

Events
Singles	Doubles
- Ostrava Open

Anastasia Dețiuc and Sabrina Santamaria defeated Lucie Havlíčková and Dominika Šalková in the final, 6–4, 7–6^{(7–4)} to win the doubles tennis title at the 2026 Ostrava Open.

Caty McNally and Alycia Parks were the reigning champions from 2022, when the tournament was last held, but did not participate this year.

== Seeds ==
1. (Mexico) Giuliana Olmos / (Indonesia) Aldila Sutjiadi (first round)
2. (United States) Quinn Gleason / (Czech Republic) Anna Sisková (semifinals)
3. (United Kingdom) Emily Appleton / (Japan) Makoto Ninomiya (first round)
4. (Czech Republic) Anastasia Dețiuc / (United States) Sabrina Santamaria (champions)

== Draw ==
Key

- Q = Qualifier
- WC = Wild card
- LL = Lucky loser
- Alt = Alternate
- ITF = ITF entry
- PR = Protected ranking
- SR = Special ranking
- SE = Special exempt
- JE = Junior exempt
- JR = Junior Accelerator Programme entrant
- CO = College Accelerator Programme entrant
- NG = Next Gen Accelerator Program entrant
- w/o = Walkover
- r = Retired
- d = Defaulted

=== Draw ===
First round
1	(Mexico) G Olmos (Indonesia) A Sutjiadi	4	6	[1]
WC	(Czech Republic) J Paštiková (Czech Republic) V Valdmannová	6	2	[10]
(Hungary) D Gálfi (Poland) M Kubka	7^{7}	6^{4}	[5]
(United Kingdom) M Brooks (China) S Feng	6^{5}	7^{7}	[10]
4	(Czech Republic) A Dețiuc (United States) S Santamaria	4	6	[10]
(Brazil) L Pigossi (Czech Republic) D Vidmanova	6	2	[4]
(Colombia) E Arango (Hungary) P Udvardy	6	3	[4]
(United Kingdom) A Barnett (France) E Lechemia	2	6	[10]
(United States) C Corley (United States) I Corley	4	7	[10]
(Spain) Y Cavallé Reimers (Italy) A Moratelli	6	5	[6]
WC	(Czech Republic) L Havlíčková (Czech Republic) D Šalková	7^{8}	6
3	(United Kingdom) E Appleton (Japan) M Ninomiya	6^{6}	4
(Germany) A-L Friedsam (Switzerland) V Golubic	6^{4}	0
(Netherlands) I Haverlag (United Kingdom) M Lumsden	7^{7}	6
A Blinkova (Czech Republic) J Malečková	2	4
2	(United States) Q Gleason (Czech Republic) A Sisková	6	6

Quarterfinals
WC	(Czech Republic) J Paštiková (Czech Republic) V Valdmannová	6	1	[6]
(United Kingdom) M Brooks (China) S Feng	1	6	[10]
4	(Czech Republic) A Dețiuc (United States) S Santamaria	6	7^{7}
(United Kingdom) A Barnett (France) E Lechemia	4	6^{5}
(United States) C Corley (United States) I Corley	2	6	[6]
WC	(Czech Republic) L Havlíčková (Czech Republic) D Šalková	6	4	[10]
(Netherlands) I Haverlag (United Kingdom) M Lumsden	4	6	[8]
2	(United States) Q Gleason (Czech Republic) A Sisková	6	1	[10]

Semifinals
(United Kingdom) M Brooks (China) S Feng	3	6	[8]
4	(Czech Republic) A Dețiuc (United States) S Santamaria	6	1	[10]
WC	(Czech Republic) L Havlíčková (Czech Republic) D Šalková	4	7^{7}	[10]
2	(United States) Q Gleason (Czech Republic) A Sisková	6	6^{2}	[8]

Final
4	(Czech Republic) A Dețiuc (United States) S Santamaria	6	7^{7}
WC	(Czech Republic) L Havlíčková (Czech Republic) D Šalková	4	6^{4}
