= 2021 Adelaide International – Doubles =

Doubles
- 2021 Adelaide International

Final
- Champions: (Chile) Alexa Guarachi (United States) Desirae Krawczyk
- Runners-up: (United States) Hayley Carter (Brazil) Luisa Stefani
- Score: 6–7^{(4–7)}, 6–4, [10–3]

Events
Singles	Doubles
← 2020 ·	Adelaide International	· 2022 →

Nicole Melichar and Xu Yifan were the defending champions but Melichar chose not to participate. Xu partnered Yang Zhaoxuan, but they lost in the semifinals to Hayley Carter and Luisa Stefani.

Alexa Guarachi and Desirae Krawczyk won the title, defeating Carter and Stefani in the final, 6–7^{(4–7)}, 6–4, [10–3].

== Seeds ==
1. (Japan) Shuko Aoyama / (Japan) Ena Shibahara (first round)
2. (China) Duan Yingying / (China) Zheng Saisai (quarterfinals)
3. (Chile) Alexa Guarachi / (United States) Desirae Krawczyk (champions)
4. (United States) Bethanie Mattek-Sands / (United States) Asia Muhammad (first round)

== Draw ==
=== Key ===
- Q = Qualifier
- WC = Wild card
- LL = Lucky loser
- Alt = Alternate
- SE = Special exempt
- PR = Protected ranking
- ITF = ITF entry
- JE = Junior exempt
- w/o = Walkover
- r = Retired
- d = Defaulted
- SR = Special ranking

=== Draw ===
First round
1	(Japan) S Aoyama (Japan) E Shibahara	4	6	[6]
(China) Y Xu (China) Z Yang	6	3	[10]
(Australia) J Fourlis (Australia) B Woolcock	1	1
(Australia) L Cabrera (Australia) M Inglis	6	6
4	(United States) B Mattek-Sands (United States) A Muhammad	1	4
(Czech Republic) L Hradecká (Slovenia) A Klepač	6	6
(Australia) E Perez (Australia) S Stosur	7^{9}	3	[4]
(United States) H Carter (Brazil) L Stefani	6^{7}	6	[10]
(Australia) Ar Rodionova (Australia) S Sanders	4	6	[3]
(Australia) A Myers (Australia) I Popovic	6	2	[10]
(Australia) D Aiava (Australia) A Sharma	6^{6}	5
3	(Chile) A Guarachi (United States) D Krawczyk	7^{8}	7
(Australia) O Gadecki (Australia) A Tomljanović	4	3
(United States) K Christian (United States) S Santamaria	6	6
(Canada) S Fichman (United States) C Gauff	5	6^{5}
2	(China) Y Duan (China) S Zheng	7	7^{7}

Quarterfinals
(China) Y Xu (China) Z Yang	6	6
(Australia) L Cabrera (Australia) M Inglis	3	3
(Czech Republic) L Hradecká (Slovenia) A Klepač	4	5
(United States) H Carter (Brazil) L Stefani	6	7
(Australia) A Myers (Australia) I Popovic	6	6^{3}	[7]
3	(Chile) A Guarachi (United States) D Krawczyk	4	7^{7}	[10]
(United States) K Christian (United States) S Santamaria	7	6
2	(China) Y Duan (China) S Zheng	5	3

Semifinals
(China) Y Xu (China) Z Yang	2	3
(United States) H Carter (Brazil) L Stefani	6	6
3	(Chile) A Guarachi (United States) D Krawczyk	6	6
(United States) K Christian (United States) S Santamaria	1	2

Final
(United States) H Carter (Brazil) L Stefani	7^{7}	4	[3]
3	(Chile) A Guarachi (United States) D Krawczyk	6^{4}	6	[10]
