= 2021 Dubai Tennis Championships – Women's singles =

Women's singles
- 2021 Dubai Tennis Championships

Final
- Champion: (Spain) Garbiñe Muguruza
- Runner-up: (Czech Republic) Barbora Krejčíková
- Score: 7–6^{(8–6)}, 6–3

Details
- Draw: 56 (8 Q / 3 WC )
- Seeds: 16

Events
Singles	men	women
Doubles	men	women
- Dubai Tennis Championships

Garbiñe Muguruza defeated Barbora Krejčíková in the final, 7–6^{(8–6)}, 6–3 to win the women's singles tennis event at the 2021 Dubai Tennis Championships. Muguruza dropped just one set during the tournament, to Aryna Sabalenka in the quarterfinals.

Simona Halep was the reigning champion, but withdrew before the tournament due to an injury.

== Seeds ==
The top eight seeds received a bye into the second round.

1. (Ukraine) Elina Svitolina (second round)
2. (Czech Republic) Karolína Plíšková (third round)
3. (Belarus) Aryna Sabalenka (quarterfinals)
4. (Czech Republic) Petra Kvitová (second round, retired)
5. (Netherlands) Kiki Bertens (second round)
6. (Switzerland) Belinda Bencic (third round)
7. (Belarus) Victoria Azarenka (withdrew)
8. (Poland) Iga Świątek (third round)

9. (Spain) Garbiñe Muguruza (champion)
10. (Belgium) Elise Mertens (semifinals)
11. (United States) Madison Keys (second round)
12. (Czech Republic) Markéta Vondroušová (second round)
13. (Croatia) Petra Martić (first round)
14. (Kazakhstan) Elena Rybakina (second round)
15. (Estonia) Anett Kontaveit (third round)
16. (Greece) Maria Sakkari (first round)

Click on the seed number of a player to go to their draw section.

== Draw ==
Key

- Q = Qualifier
- WC = Wild card
- LL = Lucky loser
- Alt = Alternate
- ITF = ITF entry
- PR = Protected ranking
- SR = Special ranking
- SE = Special exempt
- JE = Junior exempt
- JR = Junior Accelerator Programme entrant
- CO = College Accelerator Programme entrant
- NG = Next Gen Accelerator Program entrant
- w/o = Walkover
- r = Retired
- d = Defaulted

=== Finals ===
Quarterfinals
(Czech Republic) Barbora Krejčíková	6	6
WC	(Russia) Anastasia Potapova	0	2
(Switzerland) Jil Teichmann	6	6
WC	(United States) Coco Gauff	3	3
9	(Spain) Garbiñe Muguruza	3	6	6
3	(Belarus) Aryna Sabalenka	6	3	2
10	(Belgium) Elise Mertens	5	7	6
(United States) Jessica Pegula	7	5	0

Semifinals
(Czech Republic) Barbora Krejčíková	7	6
(Switzerland) Jil Teichmann	5	2
9	(Spain) Garbiñe Muguruza	6	7^{7}
10	(Belgium) Elise Mertens	4	6^{5}

Final
(Czech Republic) Barbora Krejčíková	6^{6}	3
9	(Spain) Garbiñe Muguruza	7^{8}	6

=== Top half ===
==== Section 1 ====
First round
(China) Q Wang	4	6	5
(Russia) S Kuznetsova	6	1	7
(Romania) PM Țig	3	3
(Latvia) J Ostapenko	6	6
(Czech Republic) B Krejčíková	6	7^{7}
16	(Greece) M Sakkari	2	6^{4}
11	(United States) M Keys	6	6
Q	(Chinese Taipei) E-s Liang	1	1
(Germany) L Siegemund	3	2
WC	(Russia) A Potapova	6	6
(Russia) A Pavlyuchenkova	6^{3}	2
(Russia) V Kudermetova	7^{7}	6

Second round
1	(Ukraine) E Svitolina	6	4	1
(Russia) S Kuznetsova	2	6	6
(Latvia) J Ostapenko	3	1
(Czech Republic) B Krejčíková	6	6
11	(United States) M Keys	4	3
WC	(Russia) A Potapova	6	6
(Russia) V Kudermetova	4	7	4
6	(Switzerland) B Bencic	6	5	6

Third round
(Russia) S Kuznetsova	3	2
(Czech Republic) B Krejčíková	6	6
WC	(Russia) A Potapova	6	2	7
6	(Switzerland) B Bencic	1	6	5

Quarterfinals
(Czech Republic) B Krejčíková	6	6
WC	(Russia) A Potapova	0	2

==== Section 2 ====
First round
Q	(Ukraine) K Zavatska	1	2
(Switzerland) J Teichmann	6	6
(Tunisia) O Jabeur	6	6
(Czech Republic) K Siniaková	2	3
(China) S Zheng	0	4
14	(Kazakhstan) E Rybakina	6	6
12	(Czech Republic) M Vondroušová	6	6
Q	(Romania) A Bogdan	4	4
WC	(United States) C Gauff	7^{7}	2	7^{10}
(Russia) E Alexandrova	6^{3}	6	6^{8}
Q	(Czech Republic) T Martincová	7^{7}	6^{6}	6
(Czech Republic) Kr Plíšková	6^{5}	7^{8}	3

Second round
4	(Czech Republic) P Kvitová	2	4^{r}
(Switzerland) J Teichmann	6	3
(Tunisia) O Jabeur	7^{8}	4	6
14	(Kazakhstan) E Rybakina	6^{6}	6	2
12	(Czech Republic) M Vondroušová	6	0	4
WC	(United States) C Gauff	3	6	6
Q	(Czech Republic) T Martincová	6	6
5	(Netherlands) K Bertens	1	4

Third round
(Switzerland) J Teichmann	6	6
(Tunisia) O Jabeur	3	3
WC	(United States) C Gauff	6	6
Q	(Czech Republic) T Martincová	4	2

Quarterfinals
(Switzerland) J Teichmann	6	6
WC	(United States) C Gauff	3	3

=== Bottom half ===
==== Section 3 ====
First round
LL	(Japan) M Doi	6	4	6
(Slovenia) P Hercog	2	6	3
(United States) A Anisimova	6	6
Q	(Croatia) A Konjuh	2	2
Q	(Romania) I-C Begu	3	5
9	(Spain) G Muguruza	6	7
15	(Estonia) A Kontaveit	6	6
WC	(Hungary) T Babos	2	1
(Romania) S Cîrstea	6	6
Q	(Ukraine) L Tsurenko	4	4
(France) A Cornet	6	3	6
(Russia) D Kasatkina	4	6	1

Second round
8	(Poland) I Świątek	6	6
LL	(Japan) M Doi	2	4
(United States) A Anisimova	4	2
9	(Spain) G Muguruza	6	6
15	(Estonia) A Kontaveit	6	7
(Romania) S Cîrstea	4	5
(France) A Cornet	2	4
3	(Belarus) A Sabalenka	6	6

Third round
8	(Poland) I Świątek	0	4
9	(Spain) G Muguruza	6	6
15	(Estonia) A Kontaveit	3	2
3	(Belarus) A Sabalenka	6	6

Quarterfinals
9	(Spain) G Muguruza	3	6	6
3	(Belarus) A Sabalenka	6	3	2

==== Section 4 ====
First round
(Germany) A Kerber	6	2	4
(France) C Garcia	3	6	6
(United States) S Rogers	7^{7}	6
Q	(Estonia) K Kanepi	6^{4}	2
LL	(Bulgaria) V Tomova	6	2	4
10	(Belgium) E Mertens	4	6	6
13	(Croatia) P Martić	6^{2}	4
(France) K Mladenovic	7^{7}	6
PR	(Kazakhstan) Y Shvedova	2	1
(United States) J Pegula	6	6
(Latvia) A Sevastova	6	6
(United States) B Pera	0	3

Second round
LL	(Italy) M Trevisan	2	4
(France) C Garcia	6	6
(United States) S Rogers	3	3
10	(Belgium) E Mertens	6	6
(France) K Mladenovic	1	2
(United States) J Pegula	6	6
(Latvia) A Sevastova	3	7^{7}	2
2	(Czech Republic) Ka Plíšková	6	6^{5}	6

Third round
(France) C Garcia	4	2
10	(Belgium) E Mertens	6	6
(United States) J Pegula	6	6
2	(Czech Republic) Ka Plíšková	0	2

Quarterfinals
10	(Belgium) E Mertens	5	7	6
(United States) J Pegula	7	5	0

== Qualifying ==
=== Seeds ===
1. (Estonia) Kaia Kanepi (qualified)
2. (Romania) Irina-Camelia Begu (qualified)
3. (Japan) Misaki Doi (qualifying competition, lucky loser)
4. (Italy) Martina Trevisan (qualifying competition, lucky loser)
5. (China) Zhu Lin (first round)
6. (Romania) Ana Bogdan (qualified)
7. (Ukraine) Katarina Zavatska (qualified)
8. (Belgium) Ysaline Bonaventure (first round, retired)
9. (Czech Republic) Tereza Martincová (qualified)
10. (Bulgaria) Viktoriya Tomova (qualifying competition, lucky loser)
11. (Russia) Vera Zvonareva (qualifying competition)
12. (Ukraine) Lesia Tsurenko (qualified)
13. (Romania) Monica Niculescu (first round)
14. (Russia) Natalia Vikhlyantseva (first round)
15. (Austria) Barbara Haas (qualifying competition, retired)
16. (Russia) Kamilla Rakhimova (qualifying competition)

=== Qualifiers ===
1. (Estonia) Kaia Kanepi
2. (Romania) Irina-Camelia Begu
3. (Chinese Taipei) Liang En-shuo
4. (Ukraine) Lesia Tsurenko
5. (Czech Republic) Tereza Martincová
6. (Romania) Ana Bogdan
7. (Ukraine) Katarina Zavatska
8. (Croatia) Ana Konjuh

=== Lucky losers ===
1. (Japan) Misaki Doi
2. (Bulgaria) Viktoriya Tomova
3. (Italy) Martina Trevisan

=== Draw ===
==== First qualifier ====
First round
1	(Estonia) Kaia Kanepi	6	6^{3}	6
WC	(Japan) Ena Shibahara	1	7^{7}	4
PR	(Uzbekistan) Akgul Amanmuradova	1	1
11	(Russia) Vera Zvonareva	6	6

Qualifying competition
1	(Estonia) Kaia Kanepi	6	6^{5}	6
11	(Russia) Vera Zvonareva	3	7^{7}	3

==== Second qualifier ====
First round
2	(Romania) Irina-Camelia Begu	7^{9}	4	6
(United States) Bethanie Mattek-Sands	6^{7}	6	0
WC	(Canada) Gabriela Dabrowski	6	2	3
15	(Austria) Barbara Haas	2	6	6

Qualifying competition
2	(Romania) Irina-Camelia Begu	6	4
15	(Austria) Barbara Haas	0	0^{r}

==== Third qualifier ====
First round
3	(Japan) Misaki Doi	7	6
(Poland) Magdalena Fręch	5	3
PR	(Chinese Taipei) Liang En-shuo	6	7
13	(Romania) Monica Niculescu	4	5

Qualifying competition
3	(Japan) Misaki Doi	3	1
PR	(Chinese Taipei) Liang En-shuo	6	6

==== Fourth qualifier ====
First round
4	(Italy) Martina Trevisan	5	6	6
(Australia) Arina Rodionova	7	1	3
(Spain) Cristina Bucșa	2	2
12	(Ukraine) Lesia Tsurenko	6	6

Qualifying competition
4	(Italy) Martina Trevisan	2	1
12	(Ukraine) Lesia Tsurenko	6	6

==== Fifth qualifier ====
First round
5	(China) Zhu Lin	6^{4}	2
(Netherlands) Lesley Pattinama Kerkhove	7^{7}	6
(Czech Republic) Lucie Hradecká	3	6	2
9	(Czech Republic) Tereza Martincová	6	4	6

Qualifying competition
(Netherlands) Lesley Pattinama Kerkhove	1	7^{7}	2
9	(Czech Republic) Tereza Martincová	6	6^{5}	6

==== Sixth qualifier ====
First round
6	(Romania) Ana Bogdan	6	6
(Turkey) Çağla Büyükakçay	2	4
(Romania) Jaqueline Cristian	5	5
16	(Russia) Kamilla Rakhimova	7	7

Qualifying competition
6	(Romania) Ana Bogdan	6	5	6
16	(Russia) Kamilla Rakhimova	2	7	0

==== Seventh qualifier ====
First round
7	(Ukraine) Katarina Zavatska	7	6
(Romania) Laura Ioana Paar	5	3
WC	(Russia) Angelina Gabueva	3	2
10	(Bulgaria) Viktoriya Tomova	6	6

Qualifying competition
7	(Ukraine) Katarina Zavatska	6	6
10	(Bulgaria) Viktoriya Tomova	4	4

==== Eighth qualifier ====
First round
8	(Belgium) Ysaline Bonaventure	7	3^{r}
WC	(Croatia) Ana Konjuh	5	5
PR	(Serbia) Aleksandra Krunić	6	6
14	(Russia) Natalia Vikhlyantseva	2	3

Qualifying competition
WC	(Croatia) Ana Konjuh	6	4	6
PR	(Serbia) Aleksandra Krunić	2	6	2
