= 2026 Ostrava Open =

- Date: 1–7 February
- Edition: 4th
- Category: WTA 250
- Draw: 30S / 16Q / 16D
- Prize money: $283,347
- Surface: Hard (Indoor)
- Location: Ostrava, Czech Republic

Champions

Singles
- (United Kingdom) Katie Boulter

Doubles
- (Czech Republic) Anastasia Dețiuc / (United States) Sabrina Santamaria
- Ostrava Open

The 2026 Ostrava Open was a women's tennis tournament played on indoor hard courts. It was a WTA 250 tournament on the 2026 WTA Tour. This was the fourth edition of the tournament and the first since 2022, when it was held as a WTA 500 tournament. The event took place at the Ostravar Aréna in Ostrava, Czech Republic, from 1 through 7 February 2026.

== Champions ==
=== Singles ===
- (United Kingdom) Katie Boulter def. (Germany) Tamara Korpatsch, 5–7, 6–2, 6–1

=== Doubles ===
- (Czech Republic) Anastasia Dețiuc / (United States) Sabrina Santamaria def. (Czech Republic) Lucie Havlíčková / (Czech Republic) Dominika Šalková, 6–4, 7–6^{(7–4)}

== Singles main draw entrants ==
=== Seeds ===
Country	Player	Rank^{1}	Seed
GER	Tatjana Maria	42	1
COL	Emiliana Arango	51	2
	Anna Blinkova	64	3
SVK	Rebecca Šramková	73	4
SUI	Viktorija Golubic	83	5
USA	Caty McNally	85	6
JPN	Moyuka Uchijima	88	7
HUN	Panna Udvardy	90	8

^{1} Rankings are as of January 19, 2026.

=== Other entrants ===
The following players received wildcards into the singles main draw:

- (Czech Republic) Brenda Fruhvirtová
- (Czech Republic) Lucie Havlíčková
- (Czech Republic) Tereza Martincová
- (Czech Republic) Darja Vidmanova

The following player received entry using a protected ranking:

- (France) Océane Dodin

The following players received entry from the qualifying draw:

- (Germany) Mona Barthel
- (France) Fiona Ferro
- (Czech Republic) Anna Sisková
- (Czech Republic) Vendula Valdmannová

=== Withdrawals ===
- (Poland) Magdalena Fręch → replaced by (Germany) Tamara Korpatsch
- (Andorra) Victoria Jiménez Kasintseva → replaced by (Poland) Linda Klimovičová
- (United Kingdom) Francesca Jones → replaced by (Czech Republic) Linda Fruhvirtová
- (United States) Ann Li → replaced by (France) Diane Parry
- (Argentina) Solana Sierra → replaced by (Czech Republic) Nikola Bartůňková

== Doubles main draw entrants ==
=== Seeds ===
Country	Player	Country	Player	Rank^{†}	Seed
MEX	Giuliana Olmos	INA	Aldila Sutjiadi	101	1
USA	Quinn Gleason	CZE	Anna Sisková	118	2
GBR	Emily Appleton	JPN	Makoto Ninomiya	150	3
CZE	Anastasia Dețiuc	USA	Sabrina Santamaria	157	4

^{1} Rankings as of January 19, 2026.

=== Other entrants ===
The following pairs received wildcards into the doubles main draw:

- (Czech Republic) Lucie Havlíčková / (Czech Republic) Dominika Šalková
- (Czech Republic) Julie Paštiková / (Czech Republic) Vendula Valdmannová
