= 2021 J&T Banka Ostrava Open – Singles =

Czech tennis tournament

Singles
- 2021 J&T Banka Ostrava Open

Final
- Champion: (Estonia) Anett Kontaveit
- Runner-up: (Greece) Maria Sakkari
- Score: 6–2, 7–5

Details
- Draw: 28
- Seeds: 8

Events
Singles	Doubles
← 2020 ·	J&T Banka Ostrava Open	· 2022 →

Aryna Sabalenka was the defending champion, but she chose not to compete this year.

Anett Kontaveit won her maiden WTA 500 title without dropping a set, defeating Maria Sakkari in the final, 6–2, 7–5.

== Seeds ==
The top four seeds received a bye into the second round.

1. (Poland) Iga Świątek (semifinals)
2. (Czech Republic) Petra Kvitová (semifinals)
3. (Switzerland) Belinda Bencic (quarterfinals)
4. (Greece) Maria Sakkari (final)
5. (Russia) Anastasia Pavlyuchenkova (second round)
6. (Germany) Angelique Kerber (first round)
7. (Kazakhstan) Elena Rybakina (quarterfinals)
8. (Czech Republic) Karolína Muchová (withdrew)
9. (Spain) Paula Badosa (second round)

== Draw ==
Key

- Q = Qualifier
- WC = Wild card
- LL = Lucky loser
- Alt = Alternate
- ITF = ITF entry
- PR = Protected ranking
- SR = Special ranking
- SE = Special exempt
- JE = Junior exempt
- JR = Junior Accelerator Programme entrant
- CO = College Accelerator Programme entrant
- NG = Next Gen Accelerator Program entrant
- w/o = Walkover
- r = Retired
- d = Defaulted

=== Finals ===
Semifinals
1	(Poland) Iga Świątek	4	5
4	(Greece) Maria Sakkari	6	7
(Estonia) Anett Kontaveit	6	6
2	(Czech Republic) Petra Kvitová	0	4

Final
4	(Greece) Maria Sakkari	2	5
(Estonia) Anett Kontaveit	6	7

=== Top half ===
First round
(China) S Zhang	7	6^{7}	4
(Kazakhstan) Y Putintseva	5	7^{9}	6
Q	(France) O Dodin	2	6^{3}
Q	(Poland) M Linette	6	7^{7}
(Russia) V Kudermetova	1	3
7	(Kazakhstan) E Rybakina	6	6
LL	(Russia) A Blinkova	4	0
WC	(Latvia) J Ostapenko	6	6
WC	(Czech Republic) T Martincová	5	6	7^{9}
WC	(Czech Republic) K Siniaková	7	4	6^{7}
Q	(Croatia) A Konjuh	6^{3}	1
5	(Russia) A Pavlyuchenkova	7^{7}	6

Second round
1	(Poland) I Świątek	6	6
(Kazakhstan) Y Putintseva	4	4
Q	(Poland) M Linette	3	6	1
7	(Kazakhstan) E Rybakina	6	2	6
4	(Greece) M Sakkari	6	6
WC	(Latvia) J Ostapenko	4	2
WC	(Czech Republic) T Martincová	7^{7}	7^{8}
5	(Russia) A Pavlyuchenkova	6^{5}	6^{6}

Quarterfinals
1	(Poland) I Świątek	7^{7}	6
7	(Kazakhstan) E Rybakina	6^{5}	2
4	(Greece) M Sakkari	7	6
WC	(Czech Republic) T Martincová	5	3

Semifinals
1	(Poland) I Świątek	4	5
4	(Greece) M Sakkari	6	7

=== Bottom half ===
First round
9	(Spain) P Badosa	6	6
LL	(Russia) V Gracheva	2	2
(Romania) S Cîrstea	4	4
(Estonia) A Kontaveit	6	6
Q	(Russia) A Zakharova	3	3
(Spain) S Sorribes Tormo	6	6
6	(Germany) A Kerber	2	3
(Switzerland) J Teichmann	6	6
(United States) A Riske	6	1	6
Q	(France) F Ferro	4	6	4
WC	(France) C Garcia	2	6^{6}
Q	(Russia) A Potapova	6	7^{8}

Second round
9	(Spain) P Badosa	3	4
(Estonia) A Kontaveit	6	6
(Spain) S Sorribes Tormo	2	3
3	(Switzerland) B Bencic	6	6
(Switzerland) J Teichmann	6	1	6
(United States) A Riske	3	6	4
Q	(Russia) A Potapova	1	7^{7}	3
2	(Czech Republic) P Kvitová	6	6^{4}	6

Quarterfinals
(Estonia) A Kontaveit	6	6
3	(Switzerland) B Bencic	4	3
(Switzerland) J Teichmann	4	4
2	(Czech Republic) P Kvitová	6	6

Semifinals
(Estonia) A Kontaveit	6	6
2	(Czech Republic) P Kvitová	0	4

== Qualifying ==
=== Seeds ===
1. (Russia) Ekaterina Alexandrova (qualifying competition, retired)
2. (Poland) Magda Linette (qualified)
3. (Russia) Varvara Gracheva (qualifying competition, lucky loser)
4. (Sweden) Rebecca Peterson (first round)
5. (Croatia) Ana Konjuh (qualified)
6. (France) Fiona Ferro (qualified)
7. (Russia) Anastasia Potapova (qualified)
8. (United States) Bernarda Pera (qualifying competition)
9. (France) Océane Dodin (qualified)
10. (Russia) Anna Blinkova (qualifying competition, lucky loser)
11. (Japan) Misaki Doi (first round)
12. (Australia) Astra Sharma (qualifying competition)

=== Qualifiers ===
1. (Russia) Anastasia Potapova
2. (Poland) Magda Linette
3. (France) Océane Dodin
4. (Russia) Anastasia Zakharova
5. (Croatia) Ana Konjuh
6. (France) Fiona Ferro

=== Lucky losers ===
1. (Russia) Anna Blinkova
2. (Russia) Varvara Gracheva

=== Qualifying draw ===
==== First qualifier ====
First round
1	(Russia) Ekaterina Alexandrova	6	6
WC	(Germany) Julia Lohoff	0	4
(Switzerland) Stefanie Vögele	6	2	2
7	(Russia) Anastasia Potapova	3	6	6

Qualifying competition
1	(Russia) Ekaterina Alexandrova	5	1^{r}
7	(Russia) Anastasia Potapova	7	3

==== Second qualifier ====
First round
2	(Poland) Magda Linette	6	6
(India) Rutuja Bhosale	0	1
(Poland) Katarzyna Kawa	6	6
11	(Japan) Misaki Doi	2	4

Qualifying competition
2	(Poland) Magda Linette	6	6
(Poland) Katarzyna Kawa	1	2

==== Third qualifier ====
First round
3	(Russia) Varvara Gracheva	7^{7}	6
(Kazakhstan) Anna Danilina	6^{3}	4
(Germany) Anna-Lena Friedsam	6^{3}	6^{5}
9	(France) Océane Dodin	7^{7}	7^{7}

Qualifying competition
3	(Russia) Varvara Gracheva	7^{7}	1	4
9	(France) Océane Dodin	6^{4}	6	6

==== Fourth qualifier ====
First round
4	(Sweden) Rebecca Peterson	6^{7}	6	2
(Russia) Anastasia Zakharova	7^{9}	2	6
WC	(Croatia) Antonia Ružić	4	1
12	(Australia) Astra Sharma	6	6

Qualifying competition
(Russia) Anastasia Zakharova	6	6
12	(Australia) Astra Sharma	4	3

==== Fifth qualifier ====
First round
5	(Croatia) Ana Konjuh	6	6
WC	(Slovakia) Radka Zelníčková	4	1
(Poland) Katarzyna Piter	0	1
8	(United States) Bernarda Pera	6	6

Qualifying competition
5	(Croatia) Ana Konjuh	7^{7}	6
8	(United States) Bernarda Pera	6^{4}	3

==== Sixth qualifier ====
First round
6	(France) Fiona Ferro	3	7^{7}	6
WC	(Georgia (country)) Oksana Kalashnikova	6	6^{3}	1
WC	(Netherlands) Rosalie van der Hoek	0	2
10	(Russia) Anna Blinkova	6	6

Qualifying competition
6	(France) Fiona Ferro	6	6
10	(Russia) Anna Blinkova	1	1
