= 2021 Dubai Tennis Championships – Men's doubles =

Men's doubles
- 2021 Dubai Tennis Championships

Final
- Champions: (Colombia) Juan Sebastián Cabal (Colombia) Robert Farah
- Runners-up: (Croatia) Nikola Mektić (Croatia) Mate Pavić
- Score: 7–6^{(7–0)}, 7–6^{(7–4)}

Details
- Draw: 16
- Seeds: 4

Events
Singles	men	women
Doubles	men	women
← 2020 ·	Dubai Tennis Championships	· 2022 →

John Peers and Michael Venus were the defending champions, but they chose not to participate.

Juan Sebastián Cabal and Robert Farah won the title, defeating Nikola Mektić and Mate Pavić in the final, 7–6^{(7–0)}, 7–6^{(7–4)}.

== Seeds ==
1. (Colombia) Juan Sebastián Cabal / (Colombia) Robert Farah (champions)
2. (Croatia) Nikola Mektić / (Croatia) Mate Pavić (final)
3. (Netherlands) Wesley Koolhof / (Poland) Łukasz Kubot (quarterfinals)
4. (Croatia) Ivan Dodig / (Slovakia) Filip Polášek (semifinals)

== Draw ==
=== Key ===
- Q = Qualifier
- WC = Wild card
- LL = Lucky loser
- Alt = Alternate
- SE = Special exempt
- PR = Protected ranking
- ITF = ITF entry
- JE = Junior exempt
- w/o = Walkover
- r = Retired
- d = Defaulted
- SR = Special ranking

=== Draw ===
First round
1	(Colombia) JS Cabal (Colombia) R Farah	6	6
WC	(United Arab Emirates) O Alawadhi (United Arab Emirates) HA Janahi	1	0
(United Kingdom) D Evans (Netherlands) R Haase	1	4
Q	(Italy) L Sonego (Italy) A Vavassori	6	6
3	(Netherlands) W Koolhof (Poland) Ł Kubot	6	0	[12]
(Brazil) M Melo (Netherlands) J-J Rojer	4	6	[10]
(Finland) H Kontinen (Australia) J Thompson	7^{9}	6^{4}	[6]
(Germany) K Krawietz (Germany) J-L Struff	6^{7}	7^{7}	[10]
WC	(Canada) V Pospisil (Serbia) N Zimonjić	0^{r}
(Poland) H Hurkacz (Italy) J Sinner	3
LL	(El Salvador) M Arévalo (Netherlands) M Middelkoop	6	5	[13]
4	(Croatia) I Dodig (Slovakia) F Polášek	3	7	[15]
(France) J Chardy (France) F Martin	6	7^{9}
(New Zealand) M Daniell (Austria) P Oswald	4	6^{7}
(Belgium) D Goffin (Belgium) J Vliegen	6^{2}	2
2	(Croatia) N Mektić (Croatia) M Pavić	7^{7}	6

Quarterfinals
1	(Colombia) JS Cabal (Colombia) R Farah	6	6^{7}	[11]
Q	(Italy) L Sonego (Italy) A Vavassori	4	7^{9}	[9]
3	(Netherlands) W Koolhof (Poland) Ł Kubot	7	3	[3]
(Germany) K Krawietz (Germany) J-L Struff	5	6	[10]
(Poland) H Hurkacz (Italy) J Sinner	6	6^{4}	[2]
4	(Croatia) I Dodig (Slovakia) F Polášek	3	7^{7}	[10]
(France) J Chardy (France) F Martin	7^{7}	6^{7}	[6]
2	(Croatia) N Mektić (Croatia) M Pavić	6^{3}	7^{9}	[10]

Semifinals
1	(Colombia) JS Cabal (Colombia) R Farah	6	2	[10]
(Germany) K Krawietz (Germany) J-L Struff	3	6	[7]
4	(Croatia) I Dodig (Slovakia) F Polášek	6^{4}	3
2	(Croatia) N Mektić (Croatia) M Pavić	7^{7}	6

Final
1	(Colombia) JS Cabal (Colombia) R Farah	7^{7}	7^{7}
2	(Croatia) N Mektić (Croatia) M Pavić	6^{0}	6^{4}

== Qualifying ==
=== Seeds ===
1. (El Salvador) Marcelo Arévalo / (Netherlands) Matwé Middelkoop (qualifying competition, Lucky losers)
2. (Italy) Lorenzo Sonego / (Italy) Andrea Vavassori (qualified)

=== Qualifiers ===
1. (Italy) Lorenzo Sonego / (Italy) Andrea Vavassori

=== Lucky losers ===
1. (El Salvador) Marcelo Arévalo / (Netherlands) Matwé Middelkoop

=== Qualifying draw ===
First round
1	(El Salvador) Marcelo Arévalo (Netherlands) Matwé Middelkoop	6^{6}	6	[10]
Alt	(Russia) Teymuraz Gabashvili (Kazakhstan) Dmitry Popko	7^{8}	1	[8]
PR	(India) Yuki Bhambri (India) Divij Sharan	6^{7}	5
2	(Italy) Lorenzo Sonego (Italy) Andrea Vavassori	7^{9}	7

Qualifying competition
1	(El Salvador) Marcelo Arévalo (Netherlands) Matwé Middelkoop	6^{6}	5
2	(Italy) Lorenzo Sonego (Italy) Andrea Vavassori	7^{8}	7
