= 2021 Adelaide International =

Tennis tournament on the 2021 WTA Tour

- Date: 22–27 February
- Edition: 2nd
- Category: WTA 500
- Draw: 28S / 16D
- Prize money: $535,530
- Surface: Hard / outdoor
- Location: Adelaide, Australia
- Venue: Memorial Drive Tennis Centre

Champions

Singles
- (Poland) Iga Świątek

Doubles
- (Chile) Alexa Guarachi / (United States) Desirae Krawczyk
- Adelaide International

The 2021 Adelaide International was a tennis tournament on the 2021 WTA Tour. It was played on outdoor hard courts in Adelaide, South Australia, Australia. The Adelaide International is a WTA 500 Tournament.

It was the second time this tournament was held and it took place at the Memorial Drive Tennis Centre from the 22nd to the 27th of February, 2021. For 2021, with the COVID-19 pandemic causing travel chaos, the ATP event was moved to Melbourne. It was held alongside another 250 tournament called Melbourne 2 and the ATP Cup. Adelaide was temporarily renamed the Great Ocean Road Open. The WTA event will be held the week after the Australian Open, in Adelaide. Ashleigh Barty of Australia won the 2020 edition and sought to defend her domestic title. The tournament was eventually won by Iga Swiatek, who claimed her second career title, defeating Belinda Bencic in two sets.

== Champions ==
=== Women's singles ===
- (Poland) Iga Świątek def. (Switzerland) Belinda Bencic, 6–2, 6–2

=== Women's doubles ===
- (Chile) Alexa Guarachi / (United States) Desirae Krawczyk def. (United States) Hayley Carter / (Brazil) Luisa Stefani, 6–7^{(4–7)}, 6–4, [10–3]

== Points and prize money ==
=== Point distribution ===
Event	W	F	SF	QF	Round of 16	Round of 32	Q	Q2	Q1
Women's singles	470	305	185	100	55	1	25	13	1
Women's doubles	470	305	185	100	1	—N/a	—N/a	—N/a	—N/a

=== Prize money ===
Event	W	F	SF	QF	Round of 16	Round of 32	Q2	Q1
Women's singles	$68,570	$51,000	$32,400	$15,500	$8,200	$6,650	$5,000	$2,565
Women's doubles *	$25,230	$17,750	$10,000	$5,500	$3,500	—N/a	—N/a	—N/a

_{*per team}

== Singles main-draw entrants ==
=== Seeds ===
Country	Player	Rank^{1}	Seed
AUS	Ashleigh Barty	1	1
SUI	Belinda Bencic	12	2
GBR	Johanna Konta	15	3
~~BEL~~	~~Elise Mertens~~	~~16~~	~~4~~
POL	Iga Świątek	17	5
CRO	Petra Martić	19	6
KAZ	Yulia Putintseva	28	7
CHN	Wang Qiang	34	8

- ^{1} Rankings are as of 5 March 2005.

=== Other entrants ===
The following players received wildcards into the singles main draw:

- (Australia) Ashleigh Barty
- (Australia) Olivia Gadecki
- (Australia) Samantha Stosur
- (Australia) Ajla Tomljanović

The following players received entry from the qualifying draw:

- (United States) Madison Brengle
- (United States) Coco Gauff
- (Australia) Maddison Inglis
- (Italy) Jasmine Paolini
- (Russia) Liudmila Samsonova
- (Australia) Storm Sanders

The following players received entry as lucky losers:

- (Japan) Misaki Doi
- (United States) Christina McHale

=== Withdrawals ===
Before the tournament

List of replacements
Former	Replacement
(Russia) Ekaterina Alexandrova	(United States) Danielle Collins
(Canada) Bianca Andreescu	(Switzerland) Jil Teichmann
(Belarus) Victoria Azarenka	(China) Zhang Shuai
(Czech Republic) Marie Bouzková	(Russia) Anna Blinkova
(United States) Jennifer Brady	(United States) Shelby Rogers
(Estonia) Anett Kontaveit	(France) Caroline Garcia
(Belgium) Elise Mertens	(United States) Christina McHale
(Sweden) Rebecca Peterson	(Japan) Misaki Doi
(United States) Alison Riske	(Russia) Veronika Kudermetova
(Kazakhstan) Elena Rybakina	(Germany) Laura Siegemund
(Greece) Maria Sakkari	(Russia) Anastasia Pavlyuchenkova
(Croatia) Donna Vekić	(France) Kristina Mladenovic
(Czech Republic) Markéta Vondroušová	(China) Zheng Saisai
(Ukraine) Dayana Yastremska	(China) Wang Qiang

== Doubles main-draw entrants ==
=== Seeds ===
Country	Player	Country	Player	Rank^{1}	Seed
JPN	Shuko Aoyama	JPN	Ena Shibahara	32	1
CHN	Duan Yingying	CHN	Zheng Saisai	47	2
CHI	Alexa Guarachi	USA	Desirae Krawczyk	51	3
USA	Bethanie Mattek-Sands	USA	Asia Muhammad	60	4

- ^{1} Rankings are as of 8 February 2021.

=== Withdrawals ===
Before the tournament

- (Russia) Anna Blinkova / (Russia) Veronika Kudermetova → replaced by (Canada) Sharon Fichman / (United States) Coco Gauff
- (Chinese Taipei) Chan Hao-ching / (Chinese Taipei) Latisha Chan → replaced by (Australia) Arina Rodionova / (Australia) Storm Sanders
- (Canada) Gabriela Dabrowski / (United States) Bethanie Mattek-Sands → replaced by (United States) Bethanie Mattek-Sands / (United States) Asia Muhammad
- (United States) Nicole Melichar / (Netherlands) Demi Schuurs → replaced by (United States) Kaitlyn Christian / (United States) Sabrina Santamaria
- (Australia) Samantha Stosur / (China) Zhang Shuai → replaced by (Australia) Ellen Perez / (Australia) Samantha Stosur
