= Sarah Behbehani =

Kuwaiti tennis player

- Country (sports): Kuwait
- Born: 3 November 1989 (age 35); San Francisco, United States
- Prize money: $3,373

Singles
- Career record: 0–2
- Career titles: 0

Doubles
- Career record: 0–2
- Career titles: 0
- Last updated on: 12 July 2021.

Sarah Behbehani (born 3 November 1989) is a Kuwaiti tennis player.

Behbehani made her WTA main draw debut at the 2021 Dubai Tennis Championships, where she received a wildcard to the doubles main draw.
