= 2021 Adelaide International – Singles =

Singles
- 2021 Adelaide International

Final
- Champion: (Poland) Iga Świątek
- Runner-up: (Switzerland) Belinda Bencic
- Score: 6–2, 6–2

Details
- Draw: 28 (6 Q / 4 WC )
- Seeds: 8

Events
| Singles | Doubles |
- Adelaide International

Ashleigh Barty was the defending champion, but she lost in the second round to Danielle Collins, in a rematch of the previous year's semifinal.

Iga Świątek won the title, defeating Belinda Bencic in the final, 6–2, 6–2. Świątek did not drop a set throughout the entire tournament.

== Seeds ==
The top four seeds received a bye into the second round.

1. (Australia) Ashleigh Barty (second round)
2. (Switzerland) Belinda Bencic (final)
3. (United Kingdom) Johanna Konta (second round)
4. (Belgium) Elise Mertens (withdrew)
5. (Poland) Iga Świątek (champion)
6. (Croatia) Petra Martić (second round)
7. (Kazakhstan) Yulia Putintseva (second round)
8. (China) Wang Qiang (second round)

== Draw ==
=== Finals ===
Semifinals
5 | (Poland) Iga Świątek | 6 | 6
(Switzerland) Jil Teichmann | 3 | 2
Q | (United States) Coco Gauff | 6^{2} | 7^{7} | 2
2 | (Switzerland) Belinda Bencic | 7^{7} | 6^{4} | 6

Final
5 | (Poland) Iga Świątek | 6 | 6
2 | (Switzerland) Belinda Bencic | 2 | 2

=== Top half ===
First round
(China) S Zheng | 6^{5} | 1
(United States) D Collins | 7^{7} | 6
WC | (Australia) S Stosur | 7 | 5 | 4
Q | (Australia) M Inglis | 5 | 7 | 6
Q | (United States) M Brengle | 3 | 4
5 | (Poland) I Świątek | 6 | 6
(Latvia) A Sevastova | 6 | 6
(France) C Garcia | 2 | 4
(Switzerland) J Teichmann | 6 | 7^{7}
(France) K Mladenovic | 2 | 6^{5}
WC | (Australia) O Gadecki | 4 | 3
8 | (China) Q Wang | 6 | 6

Second round
1/WC | (Australia) A Barty | 3 | 4
(United States) D Collins | 6 | 6
Q | (Australia) M Inglis | 1 | 3
5 | (Poland) I Świątek | 6 | 6
LL | (United States) C McHale | 4 | 1
(Latvia) A Sevastova | 6 | 6
(Switzerland) J Teichmann | 3 | 6 | 6
8 | (China) Q Wang | 6 | 3 | 3

Quarterfinals
(United States) D Collins | 2 | 0^{r}
5 | (Poland) I Świątek | 6 | 3
(Latvia) A Sevastova | 4 | 7^{10} | 5
(Switzerland) J Teichmann | 6 | 6^{8} | 7

Semifinals
5 | (Poland) I Świątek | 6 | 6
(Switzerland) J Teichmann | 3 | 2

=== Bottom half ===
First round
6 | (Croatia) P Martić | 4 | 6 | 7
Q | (Russia) L Samsonova | 6 | 0 | 5
Q | (Italy) J Paolini | 4 | 7^{7} | 2
Q | (United States) C Gauff | 6 | 6^{4} | 6
(United States) S Rogers | 6 | 7^{7}
(Russia) V Kudermetova | 3 | 6^{4}
7 | (Kazakhstan) Y Putintseva | 6 | 6
(Germany) L Siegemund | 4 | 4
Q | (Australia) S Sanders | 6 | 6
WC | (Australia) A Tomljanović | 1 | 2
(Russia) A Blinkova | 6^{5} | 6 | 2
LL | (Japan) M Doi | 7^{7} | 3 | 6

Second round
6 | (Croatia) P Martić | 7 | 3 | 4
Q | (United States) C Gauff | 5 | 6 | 6
(United States) S Rogers | 6 | 6
3 | (United Kingdom) J Konta | 2 | 2
7 | (Kazakhstan) Y Putintseva | 4 | 7 | 1
Q | (Australia) S Sanders | 6 | 5 | 6
LL | (Japan) M Doi | 1 | 3
2 | (Switzerland) B Bencic | 6 | 6

Quarterfinals
Q | (United States) C Gauff | 2 | 6 | 6
(United States) S Rogers | 6 | 4 | 4
Q | (Australia) S Sanders | 2 | 4
2 | (Switzerland) B Bencic | 6 | 6

Semifinals
Q | (United States) C Gauff | 6^{2} | 7^{7} | 2
2 | (Switzerland) B Bencic | 7^{7} | 6^{4} | 6

== Qualifying ==
=== Seeds ===
1. (United States) Coco Gauff (qualified)
2. (United States) Bernarda Pera (first round)
3. (United States) Christina McHale (qualifying competition, lucky loser)
4. (United States) Madison Brengle (qualified)
5. (Japan) Misaki Doi (qualifying competition, lucky loser)
6. (Italy) Jasmine Paolini (qualified)
7. (China) Wang Yafan (first round)
8. (Slovenia) Kaja Juvan (qualifying competition)
9. (United States) Caty McNally (qualifying competition)
10. (Russia) Liudmila Samsonova (qualified)
11. (Australia) Astra Sharma (qualifying competition)
12. (Australia) Maddison Inglis (qualified)

=== Qualifiers ===
1. (United States) Coco Gauff
2. (Australia) Storm Sanders
3. (Australia) Maddison Inglis
4. (United States) Madison Brengle
5. (Russia) Liudmila Samsonova
6. (Italy) Jasmine Paolini

=== Lucky losers ===
1. (Japan) Misaki Doi
2. (United States) Christina McHale

=== Qualifying draw ===
==== First qualifier ====
First round
1 | (United States) Coco Gauff | 6 | 6
(United Kingdom) Francesca Jones | 1 | 4
(Australia) Lizette Cabrera | 4 | 3
8 | (Slovenia) Kaja Juvan | 6 | 6

Qualifying competition
1 | (United States) Coco Gauff | 3 | 7 | 6
8 | (Slovenia) Kaja Juvan | 6 | 5 | 3

==== Second qualifier ====
First round
2 | (United States) Bernarda Pera | 2 | 6 | 3
WC | (Australia) Storm Sanders | 6 | 4 | 6
(India) Ankita Raina | 1 | 3
9 | (United States) Caty McNally | 6 | 6

Qualifying competition
WC | (Australia) Storm Sanders | 6 | 6
9 | (United States) Caty McNally | 2 | 3

==== Third qualifier ====
First round
3 | (United States) Christina McHale | 6 | 6
WC | (Australia) Ivana Popovic | 4 | 4
WC | (Australia) Belinda Woolcock | 4 | 4
12 | (Australia) Maddison Inglis | 6 | 6

Qualifying competition
3 | (United States) Christina McHale | 6 | 2 | 1
12 | (Australia) Maddison Inglis | 4 | 6 | 6

==== Fourth qualifier ====
First round
4 | (United States) Madison Brengle | 6 | 6
(Australia) Destanee Aiava | 2 | 2
(Australia) Ellen Perez | 6 | 6
7 | (China) Wang Yafan | 1 | 4

Qualifying competition
4 | (United States) Madison Brengle | 6 | 6
(Australia) Ellen Perez | 3 | 2

==== Fifth qualifier ====
First round
5 | (Japan) Misaki Doi | 7 | 6
(Australia) Arina Rodionova | 5 | 1
WC | (Australia) Kimberly Birrell | 3 | 2
10 | (Russia) Liudmila Samsonova | 6 | 6

Qualifying competition
5 | (Japan) Misaki Doi | 6^{6} | 3
10 | (Russia) Liudmila Samsonova | 7^{8} | 6

==== Sixth qualifier ====
First round
6 | (Italy) Jasmine Paolini | 4 | 6 | 7^{7}
(United States) Asia Muhammad | 6 | 3 | 6^{3}
(Ukraine) Lesia Tsurenko | 4 | 6 | 1
11 | (Australia) Astra Sharma | 6 | 4 | 6

Qualifying competition
6 | (Italy) Jasmine Paolini | 3 | 6 | 6
11 | (Australia) Astra Sharma | 6 | 2 | 1
