= 2021 Dubai Tennis Championships =

- Date: 7–13 March (women); 14–20 March (men)
- Edition: 29th (men) / 21st (women)
- Category: ATP World Tour 500 (men); WTA 1000 (women)
- Draw: 48S / 16D (men); 56S / 28D (women)
- Prize money: $1,897,805 (men) $1,835,490 (women)
- Surface: Hard, Outdoor
- Location: Dubai, United Arab Emirates
- Venue: Aviation Club Tennis Centre

Champions

Men's singles
- (Russia) Aslan Karatsev

Women's singles
- (Spain) Garbiñe Muguruza

Men's doubles
- (Colombia) Juan Sebastián Cabal / (Colombia) Robert Farah

Women's doubles
- (Chile) Alexa Guarachi / (Croatia) Darija Jurak
- Dubai Tennis Championships

The 2021 Dubai Tennis Championships (also known as the Dubai Duty Free Tennis Championships for sponsorship reasons) was an ATP 500 event on the 2021 ATP Tour and a WTA 1000 tournament on the 2021 WTA Tour. Both events were originally scheduled for February 15 to 21 and February 22 to 28 for women's and men's tournaments, respectively. They were rescheduled to March 7 to 13 and March 14 to 20 due to the Australian Open reschedule and were held at the Aviation Club Tennis Centre in Dubai, United Arab Emirates.

== Champions ==
=== Men's singles ===
- (Russia) Aslan Karatsev def. (South Africa) Lloyd Harris, 6–3, 6–2

This was Karatsev's first ATP Tour singles title.

=== Women's singles ===
- (Spain) Garbiñe Muguruza def. (Czech Republic) Barbora Krejčíková, 7–6^{(8–6)}, 6–3

=== Men's doubles ===
- (Colombia) Juan Sebastián Cabal / (Colombia) Robert Farah def. (Croatia) Nikola Mektić / (Croatia) Mate Pavić, 7–6^{(7–0)}, 7–6^{(7–4)}

=== Women's doubles ===
- (Chile) Alexa Guarachi / (Croatia) Darija Jurak def. (China) Xu Yifan / (China) Yang Zhaoxuan, 6–0, 6–3

== ATP singles main-draw entrants ==
=== Seeds ===
Country	Player	Ranking^{1}	Seed
AUT	Dominic Thiem	4	1
RUS	Andrey Rublev	8	2
CAN	Denis Shapovalov	11	3
ESP	Roberto Bautista Agut	13	4
BEL	David Goffin	14	5
ESP	Pablo Carreño Busta	16	6
~~SUI~~	~~Stan Wawrinka~~	~~20~~	~~7~~
RUS	Karen Khachanov	21	8
AUS	Alex de Minaur	23	9
~~CRO~~	~~Borna Ćorić~~	~~24~~	~~10~~
SRB	Dušan Lajović	27	11
GBR	Dan Evans	28	12
POL	Hubert Hurkacz	30	13
SRB	Filip Krajinović	32	14
USA	Taylor Fritz	33	15
ITA	Jannik Sinner	34	16
ITA	Lorenzo Sonego	35	17

- Rankings are as of March 8, 2021.

=== Other entrants ===
The following players received wildcards into the singles main draw:

- (Tunisia) Malek Jaziri
- (Russia) Aslan Karatsev
- (Austria) Dennis Novak
- (Australia) Alexei Popyrin

The following player received entry using as a special exempt:

- (Australia) Matthew Ebden

The following players received entry from the qualifying draw:

- (India) Yuki Bhambri
- (South Africa) Lloyd Harris
- (Kazakhstan) Mikhail Kukushkin
- (Australia) Christopher O'Connell
- (Finland) Emil Ruusuvuori
- (Spain) Bernabé Zapata Miralles

The following players received entry as lucky losers:

- (Moldova) Radu Albot
- (Italy) Lorenzo Giustino

=== Withdrawals ===
Before the tournament

- (Italy) Matteo Berrettini → replaced by (Spain) Alejandro Davidovich Fokina
- (Croatia) Borna Ćorić → replaced by (Italy) Lorenzo Giustino
- (Switzerland) Roger Federer → replaced by (Japan) Yoshihito Nishioka
- (Australia) Nick Kyrgios → replaced by (Slovenia) Aljaž Bedene
- (France) Gaël Monfils → replaced by (Hungary) Márton Fucsovics
- (Switzerland) Stan Wawrinka → replaced by (Moldova) Radu Albot

=== Retirements ===
- (Australia) Matthew Ebden
- (France) Jo-Wilfried Tsonga

== ATP doubles main-draw entrants ==
=== Seeds ===
Country	Player	Country	Player	Rank^{1}	Seed
COL	Juan Sebastián Cabal	COL	Robert Farah	3	1
CRO	Nikola Mektić	CRO	Mate Pavić	7	2
NED	Wesley Koolhof	POL	Łukasz Kubot	19	3
CRO	Ivan Dodig	SVK	Filip Polášek	19	4

- Rankings are as of March 8, 2021.

=== Other entrants ===
The following pairs received wildcards into the doubles main draw:

- (United Arab Emirates) Omar Alawadhi / (United Arab Emirates) Hamad Abbas Janahi
- (Canada) Vasek Pospisil / (Serbia) Nenad Zimonjić

The following pair received entry from the qualifying draw:

- (Italy) Lorenzo Sonego / (Italy) Andrea Vavassori

=== Withdrawals ===
Before the tournament

- (Finland) Henri Kontinen / (France) Édouard Roger-Vasselin → replaced by (Finland) Henri Kontinen / (Australia) Jordan Thompson
- (Belgium) Sander Gillé / (Belgium) Joran Vliegen → replaced by (Belgium) David Goffin / (Belgium) Joran Vliegen
- (Russia) Karen Khachanov / (Russia) Andrey Rublev → replaced by (El Salvador) Marcelo Arévalo / (Netherlands) Matwé Middelkoop

== WTA singles main-draw entrants ==
=== Seeds ===
Country	Player	Ranking^{1}	Seed
UKR	Elina Svitolina	5	1
CZE	Karolína Plíšková	6	2
BLR	Aryna Sabalenka	8	3
CZE	Petra Kvitová	10	4
NED	Kiki Bertens	11	5
SUI	Belinda Bencic	12	6
~~BLR~~	~~Victoria Azarenka~~	~~14~~	~~7~~
POL	Iga Świątek	15	8
ESP	Garbiñe Muguruza	16	9
BEL	Elise Mertens	18	10
USA	Madison Keys	19	11
CZE	Markéta Vondroušová	20	12
CRO	Petra Martić	21	13
KAZ	Elena Rybakina	23	14
EST	Anett Kontaveit	24	15
GRE	Maria Sakkari	25	16

- Rankings are as of March 1, 2021.

=== Other entrants ===
The following players received wildcards into the singles main draw:

- (Hungary) Tímea Babos
- (United States) Coco Gauff
- (Russia) Anastasia Potapova

The following player received entry into the singles main draw using a protected ranking:

- (Kazakhstan) Yaroslava Shvedova

The following players received entry from the qualifying draw:

- (Romania) Irina-Camelia Begu
- (Romania) Ana Bogdan
- (Estonia) Kaia Kanepi
- (Croatia) Ana Konjuh
- (Chinese Taipei) Liang En-shuo
- (Czech Republic) Tereza Martincová
- (Ukraine) Lesia Tsurenko
- (Ukraine) Katarina Zavatska

The following players received entry as lucky losers:

- (Japan) Misaki Doi
- (Bulgaria) Viktoriya Tomova
- (Italy) Martina Trevisan

=== Withdrawals ===
Before the tournament

- (Canada) Bianca Andreescu → replaced by (France) Alizé Cornet
- (Belarus) Victoria Azarenka → replaced by (Italy) Martina Trevisan
- (Spain) Paula Badosa → replaced by (Japan) Misaki Doi
- (Australia) Ashleigh Barty → replaced by (Czech Republic) Kateřina Siniaková
- (United States) Jennifer Brady → replaced by (United States) Bernarda Pera
- (United States) Danielle Collins → replaced by (Czech Republic) Kristýna Plíšková
- (France) Fiona Ferro → replaced by (Bulgaria) Viktoriya Tomova
- (Romania) Simona Halep → replaced by (United States) Jessica Pegula
- (United States) Sofia Kenin → replaced by (France) Kristina Mladenovic
- (Poland) Magda Linette → replaced by (Switzerland) Jil Teichmann
- (Czech Republic) Karolína Muchová → replaced by (Czech Republic) Barbora Krejčíková
- (Kazakhstan) Yulia Putintseva → replaced by (Spain) Paula Badosa
- (United States) Alison Riske → replaced by (Latvia) Anastasija Sevastova
- (Czech Republic) Barbora Strýcová → replaced by (Germany) Laura Siegemund
- (Croatia) Donna Vekić → replaced by (Romania) Patricia Maria Țig
- (China) Zhang Shuai → replaced by (United States) Shelby Rogers

=== Retirements ===
- (Czech Republic) Petra Kvitová (right adductor)

== WTA doubles main-draw entrants ==
=== Seeds ===
Country	Player	Country	Player	Rank^{1}	Seed
BEL	Elise Mertens	BLR	Aryna Sabalenka	3	1
CZE	Barbora Krejčíková	CZE	Kateřina Siniaková	15	2
USA	Nicole Melichar	NED	Demi Schuurs	23	3
JPN	Shuko Aoyama	JPN	Ena Shibahara	29	4
HUN	Tímea Babos	RUS	Veronika Kudermetova	32	5
CAN	Gabriela Dabrowski	USA	Coco Gauff	57	6
USA	Hayley Carter	BRA	Luisa Stefani	61	7
CHI	Alexa Guarachi	CRO	Darija Jurak	63	8

- Rankings are as of March 1, 2021.

=== Other entrants ===
The following pairs received a wildcard into the doubles main draw:

- (Kuwait) Sarah Behbehani / (Turkey) Çağla Büyükakçay
- (United Kingdom) Eden Silva / (Netherlands) Rosalie van der Hoek

The following pairs received entry into the doubles main draw using protected rankings:

- (Russia) Natela Dzalamidze / (Sweden) Cornelia Lister
- (Slovenia) Andreja Klepač / (India) Sania Mirza
- (Serbia) Aleksandra Krunić / (Russia) Alexandra Panova
- (Kazakhstan) Elena Rybakina / (Kazakhstan) Yaroslava Shvedova

=== Withdrawals ===
Before the tournament

- (China) Zhang Shuai / (China) Zheng Saisai → replaced by (United States) Shelby Rogers / (China) Zheng Saisai
- (Canada) Sharon Fichman / (Romania) Monica Niculescu → replaced by (Romania) Monica Niculescu / (Russia) Anastasia Potapova

=== Retirements ===
- (Romania) Monica Niculescu / (Russia) Anastasia Potapova (eye injury)
