= 2020 J&T Banka Ostrava Open – Singles =

Singles
- 2020 J&T Banka Ostrava Open

Final
- Champion: (Belarus) Aryna Sabalenka
- Runner-up: (Belarus) Victoria Azarenka
- Score: 6–2, 6–2

Events
Singles	Doubles
- Ostrava Open

This was the first edition of the tournament, primarily organised due to the cancellation of many tournaments during the 2020 season, because of the ongoing COVID-19 pandemic.

Aryna Sabalenka won the title, defeating Victoria Azarenka in the final, 6–2, 6–2. The final of this event was the first WTA singles final to be contested between two Belarusian players. Sabalenka won the title after being 6–0, 4–0 down, and facing break points to go 5–0 down, in her quarterfinal match against Sara Sorribes Tormo. After losing 10 games in a row, Sabalenka then won 12 games in a row.

== Seeds ==
The top four seeds received a bye into the second round.

1. (Ukraine) Elina Svitolina (second round)
2. (Czech Republic) Karolína Plíšková (second round)
3. (Belarus) Aryna Sabalenka (champion)
4. (Belarus) Victoria Azarenka (final)
5. (Croatia) Petra Martić (first round)
6. (Kazakhstan) Elena Rybakina (first round)
7. (Belgium) Elise Mertens (quarterfinals)
8. (Estonia) Anett Kontaveit (second round)

== Draw ==
Key

- Q = Qualifier
- WC = Wild card
- LL = Lucky loser
- Alt = Alternate
- ITF = ITF entry
- PR = Protected ranking
- SR = Special ranking
- SE = Special exempt
- JE = Junior exempt
- JR = Junior Accelerator Programme entrant
- CO = College Accelerator Programme entrant
- NG = Next Gen Accelerator Program entrant
- w/o = Walkover
- r = Retired
- d = Defaulted

=== Finals ===
Semifinals
(Greece) Maria Sakkari	1	3
4	(Belarus) Victoria Azarenka	6	6
3	(Belarus) Aryna Sabalenka	6	6
(United States) Jennifer Brady	4	4

Final
4	(Belarus) Victoria Azarenka	2	2
3	(Belarus) Aryna Sabalenka	6	6

=== Top half ===
First round
WC	(Czech Republic) K Plíšková	3	3
(Greece) M Sakkari	6	6
(Czech Republic) B Strýcová	2	2
(Tunisia) O Jabeur	6	6
WC	(Latvia) J Ostapenko	6	6
5	(Croatia) P Martić	3	1
Q	(Czech Republic) B Krejčíková	7	6
Q	(Czech Republic) T Martincová	5	1
(China) S Zhang	1	1
(Czech Republic) K Muchová	6	6
(United States) A Anisimova	2	3
7	(Belgium) E Mertens	6	6

Second round
1	(Ukraine) E Svitolina	3	3
(Greece) M Sakkari	6	6
(Tunisia) O Jabeur	6	6
WC	(Latvia) J Ostapenko	4	4
4	(Belarus) V Azarenka	2	6	6
Q	(Czech Republic) B Krejčíková	6	2	1
(Czech Republic) K Muchová	4	2
7	(Belgium) E Mertens	6	6

Quarterfinals
(Greece) M Sakkari	3	6	6
(Tunisia) O Jabeur	6	3	1
4	(Belarus) V Azarenka	6	6
7	(Belgium) E Mertens	4	1

Semifinals
(Greece) M Sakkari	1	3
4	(Belarus) V Azarenka	6	6

=== Bottom half ===
First round
8	(Estonia) A Kontaveit	4	6	7^{8}
(Russia) E Alexandrova	6	2	6^{6}
Q	(Spain) S Sorribes Tormo	6	6
(Poland) M Linette	1	3
WC	(Czech Republic) K Siniaková	5	4
Q	(United States) C Gauff	7	6
6	(Kazakhstan) E Rybakina	2	6	3
Q	(Russia) D Kasatkina	6	3	6
(Ukraine) D Yastremska	6	6^{6}	1
(United States) J Brady	3	7^{8}	6
Q	(Russia) V Kudermetova	6	6
(Croatia) D Vekić	2	4

Second round
8	(Estonia) A Kontaveit	1	4
Q	(Spain) S Sorribes Tormo	6	6
Q	(United States) C Gauff	6	5	6^{2}
3	(Belarus) A Sabalenka	1	7	7^{7}
Q	(Russia) D Kasatkina	5	2
(United States) J Brady	7	6
Q	(Russia) V Kudermetova	4	6	6
2	(Czech Republic) Ka Plíšková	6	4	3

Quarterfinals
Q	(Spain) S Sorribes Tormo	6	4	0
3	(Belarus) A Sabalenka	0	6	6
(United States) J Brady	6^{5}	6	6
Q	(Russia) V Kudermetova	7^{7}	3	1

Semifinals
3	(Belarus) A Sabalenka	6	6
(United States) J Brady	4	4

== Qualifying ==
=== Seeds ===
1. (Russia) Veronika Kudermetova (qualified)
2. (Czech Republic) Marie Bouzková (qualifying competition)
3. (United States) Coco Gauff (qualified)
4. (Switzerland) Jil Teichmann (qualifying competition)
5. (Russia) Anna Blinkova (qualifying competition, retired)
6. (United States) Bernarda Pera (first round)
7. (Spain) Paula Badosa (qualifying competition)
8. (Netherlands) Arantxa Rus (qualifying competition)
9. (Spain) Sara Sorribes Tormo (qualified)
10. (Russia) Daria Kasatkina (qualified)
11. (Romania) Irina-Camelia Begu (qualifying competition)
12. (Czech Republic) Barbora Krejčíková (qualified)

=== Qualifiers ===
1. (Russia) Veronika Kudermetova
2. (Russia) Daria Kasatkina
3. (United States) Coco Gauff
4. (Czech Republic) Barbora Krejčíková
5. (Spain) Sara Sorribes Tormo
6. (Czech Republic) Tereza Martincová

=== Qualifying draw ===
==== First qualifier ====
First round
1	(Russia) Veronika Kudermetova	7^{7}	6
(Switzerland) Stefanie Vögele	6^{5}	3
(Italy) Jasmine Paolini	4	3
8	(Netherlands) Arantxa Rus	6	6

Qualifying competition
1	(Russia) Veronika Kudermetova	7	6
8	(Netherlands) Arantxa Rus	5	2

==== Second qualifier ====
First round
2	(Czech Republic) Marie Bouzková	6	6
(Ukraine) Katarina Zavatska	3	2
WC	(United States) Bethanie Mattek-Sands	4	2
10	(Russia) Daria Kasatkina	6	6

Qualifying competition
2	(Czech Republic) Marie Bouzková	4	7	5
10	(Russia) Daria Kasatkina	6	5	7

==== Third qualifier ====
First round
3/WC	(United States) Coco Gauff	6	6
WC	(Slovakia) Jana Čepelová	1	0
(Russia) Varvara Gracheva	7^{7}	2	1
11	(Romania) Irina-Camelia Begu	6^{5}	6	6

Qualifying competition
3/WC	(United States) Coco Gauff	6	6
11	(Romania) Irina-Camelia Begu	4	4

==== Fourth qualifier ====
First round
4	(Switzerland) Jil Teichmann	7	6
(Germany) Anna-Lena Friedsam	5	3
(Slovenia) Kaja Juvan	3	0
12	(Czech Republic) Barbora Krejčíková	6	6

Qualifying competition
4	(Switzerland) Jil Teichmann	3	2
12	(Czech Republic) Barbora Krejčíková	6	6

==== Fifth qualifier ====
First round
5	(Russia) Anna Blinkova	7^{7}	6
(Slovenia) Tamara Zidanšek	6^{5}	4
(Romania) Ana Bogdan	4	4
9	(Spain) Sara Sorribes Tormo	6	6

Qualifying competition
5	(Russia) Anna Blinkova	6	2^{r}
9	(Spain) Sara Sorribes Tormo	4	5

==== Sixth qualifier ====
First round
6	(United States) Bernarda Pera	4	7^{8}	3
WC	(Czech Republic) Tereza Martincová	6	6^{6}	6
(Romania) Sorana Cîrstea	3	3
7	(Spain) Paula Badosa	6	6

Qualifying competition
WC	(Czech Republic) Tereza Martincová	6	6
7	(Spain) Paula Badosa	3	2
