= Ostrava Open =

Tournament information
- Event name: J&T Banka Ostrava Open (2020–21); AGEL Open (2022)
- Tour: WTA Tour
- Founded: 2020
- Editions: 4
- Location: Ostrava, Czech Republic
- Venue: Ostravar Aréna
- Category: WTA 250 (2026–); WTA 500 (2021–2022); WTA Premier (2020)
- Surface: Hard (Indoor)
- Draw: 30S / 16D
- Prize money: US$283,347 (2026)
- Website: Website

Current champions (2026)
- Women's singles: (United Kingdom) Katie Boulter
- Women's doubles: (Czech Republic) Anastasia Dețiuc (United States) Sabrina Santamaria

The Ostrava Open is a tennis tournament for female professional players. It is a WTA 250-level event held in February and played in the Ostravar Aréna and at the Ridera Sports Complex in Ostrava on indoor hardcourts. It was first organized in 2020 as a WTA 500 event after a 20-year absence to make up for the many tournaments cancelled during the 2020 season, due to the ongoing COVID-19 pandemic.

== History ==
The WTA 500 event was held until 2022, with the WTA announcing in June 2023 that the event would not return. In 2026, the tournament returned to the WTA calendar, staging a WTA 250-level in February.

== Results ==
=== Singles ===
Location	Year	Champions	Runners-up	Score
Ostrava
Ostrava	↓ WTA 500 tournament ↓			
Ostrava	2020	(Belarus) Aryna Sabalenka	(Belarus) Victoria Azarenka	6–2, 6–2
Ostrava	2021	(Estonia) Anett Kontaveit	(Greece) Maria Sakkari	6–2, 7–5
Ostrava	2022	(Czech Republic) Barbora Krejčíková	(Poland) Iga Świątek	5–7, 7–6^{(7–4)}, 6–3
Ostrava	2023–2025	Not held		
Ostrava	↓ WTA 250 tournament ↓			
Ostrava	2026	(United Kingdom) Katie Boulter	(Germany) Tamara Korpatsch	5–7, 6–2, 6–1

=== Doubles ===
Location	Year	Champions	Runners-up	Score
Ostrava
Ostrava	↓ WTA 500 tournament ↓			
Ostrava	2020	(Belgium) Elise Mertens (Belarus) Aryna Sabalenka	(Canada) Gabriela Dabrowski (Brazil) Luisa Stefani	6–1, 6–3
Ostrava	2021	(India) Sania Mirza (China) Zhang Shuai	(United States) Kaitlyn Christian (New Zealand) Erin Routliffe	6–3, 6–2
Ostrava	2022	(United States) Caty McNally (United States) Alycia Parks	(Poland) Alicja Rosolska (New Zealand) Erin Routliffe	6–3, 6–2
Ostrava	2023–2025	Not held		
Ostrava	↓ WTA 250 tournament ↓			
Ostrava	2026	(Czech Republic) Anastasia Dețiuc (United States) Sabrina Santamaria	(Czech Republic) Lucie Havlíčková (Czech Republic) Dominika Šalková	6–4, 7–6^{(7–4)}
