= 2022 WTA Tour =

Women's tennis circuit

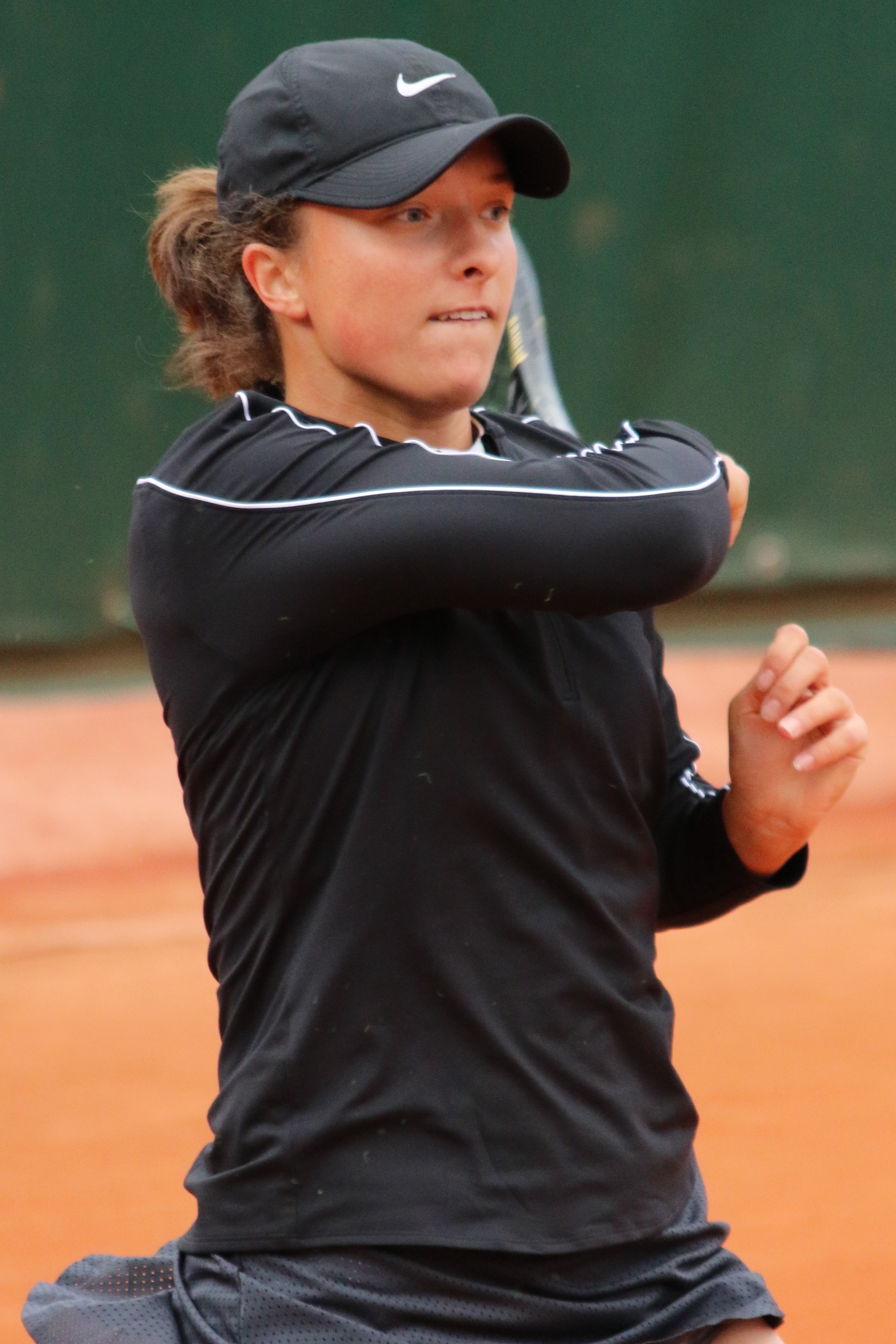
- Iga Świątek finished the year as world No. 1 for the first time in her career. She won eight tournaments during the season, including two majors at the French Open and US Open. She also won four WTA 1000 events.

Details
- Duration: 3 January – 13 November 2022
- Edition: 52nd
- Tournaments: 55
- Categories: Grand Slam (4); WTA Finals; WTA 1000 (8); WTA 500 (12); WTA 250 (30)

Achievements (singles)
- Most titles: (Poland) Iga Świątek (8)
- Most finals: (Poland) Iga Świątek (9)
- Prize money leader: (Poland) Iga Świątek ($9,875,525)
- Points leader: (Poland) Iga Świątek (11,085)

Awards
- Player of the year: (Poland) Iga Świątek
- Doubles team of the year: (Czech Republic) Barbora Krejčíková (Czech Republic) Kateřina Siniaková
- Most improved player of the year: (Brazil) Beatriz Haddad Maia
- Newcomer of the year: (China) Zheng Qinwen
- Comeback player of the year: (Germany) Tatjana Maria

The 2022 WTA Tour (branded as the 2022 Hologic WTA Tour for sponsorship reasons) was the global elite women's professional tennis circuit organized by the Women's Tennis Association (WTA) for the 2022 tennis season. The 2022 WTA Tour calendar comprised the Grand Slam tournaments (supervised by the International Tennis Federation (ITF)), the WTA 1000 tournaments, the WTA 500 tournaments, the WTA 250 tournaments, the Billie Jean King Cup (organized by the ITF), and the year-end championships (the WTA Finals).

On December 1, 2021, WTA chairman Steve Simon announced that all tournaments scheduled to be held in both China and Hong Kong were suspended beginning in 2022, due to concerns regarding the security and well-being of tennis player Peng Shuai after her allegations of sexual assault against Zhang Gaoli, a high-ranking member of the Chinese Communist Party.

As part of international sports' reaction to the Russian invasion of Ukraine, the WTA, the ATP (Association of Tennis Professionals), the ITF, and the four Grand Slam tournaments jointly decided that players from Belarus and Russia would not be allowed to play under the names or flags of their countries, but would remain eligible to play events until further notice. On 20 May 2022, the ATP and WTA also announced that ranking points would not be awarded for Wimbledon, due to a decision by the All England Club to prohibit players representing Belarus or Russia from participating in the tournament.

In March 2022, Hologic, an American medical diagnostics and technology company, signed a multi-year deal to become the first WTA Tour title sponsor since 2010 after the WTA's partnership with Sony Ericsson had ended. Hologic cited the WTA's stance on withholding events in China in the wake of Peng's allegations as one of its factors in deciding to sponsor the circuit.

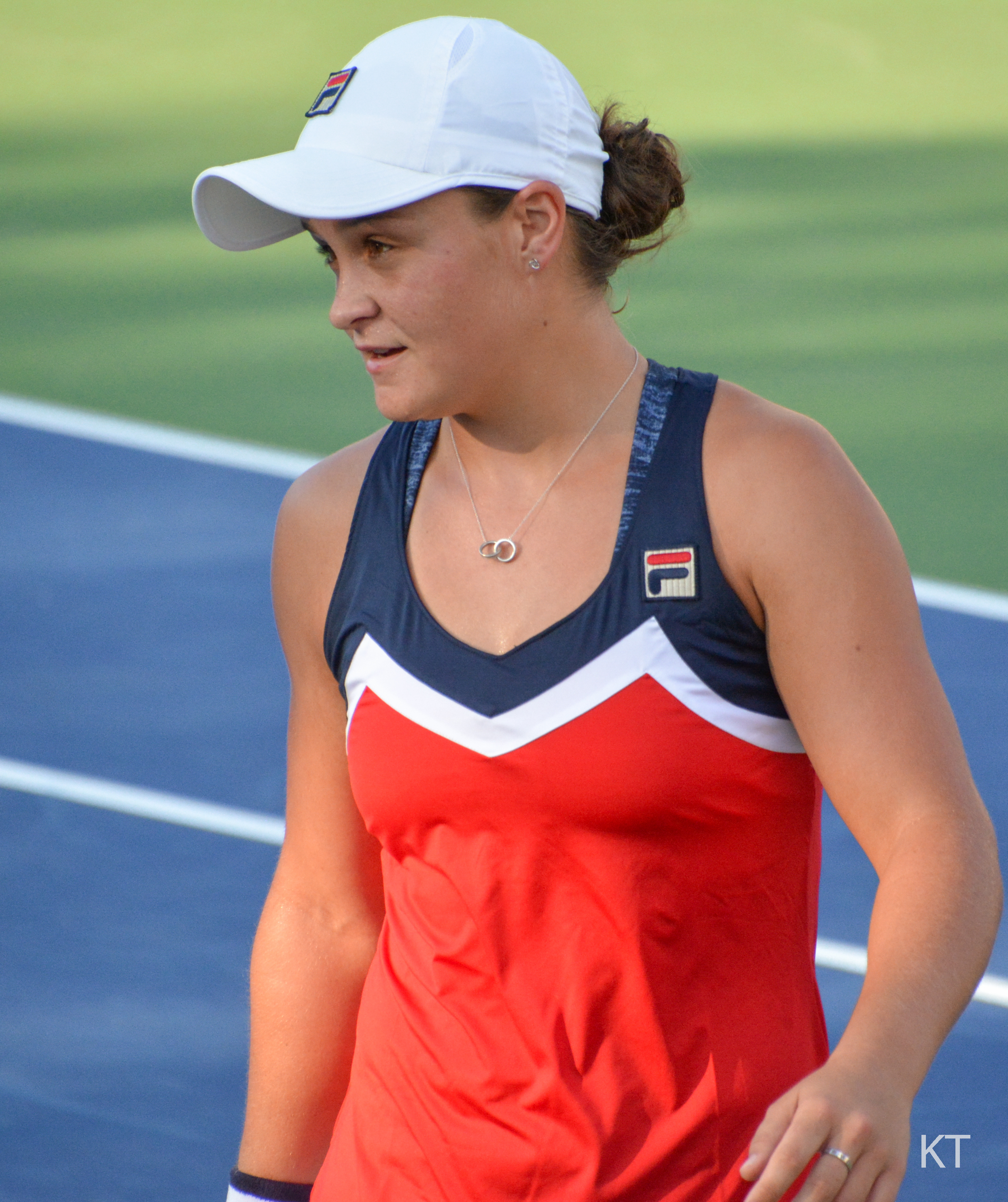
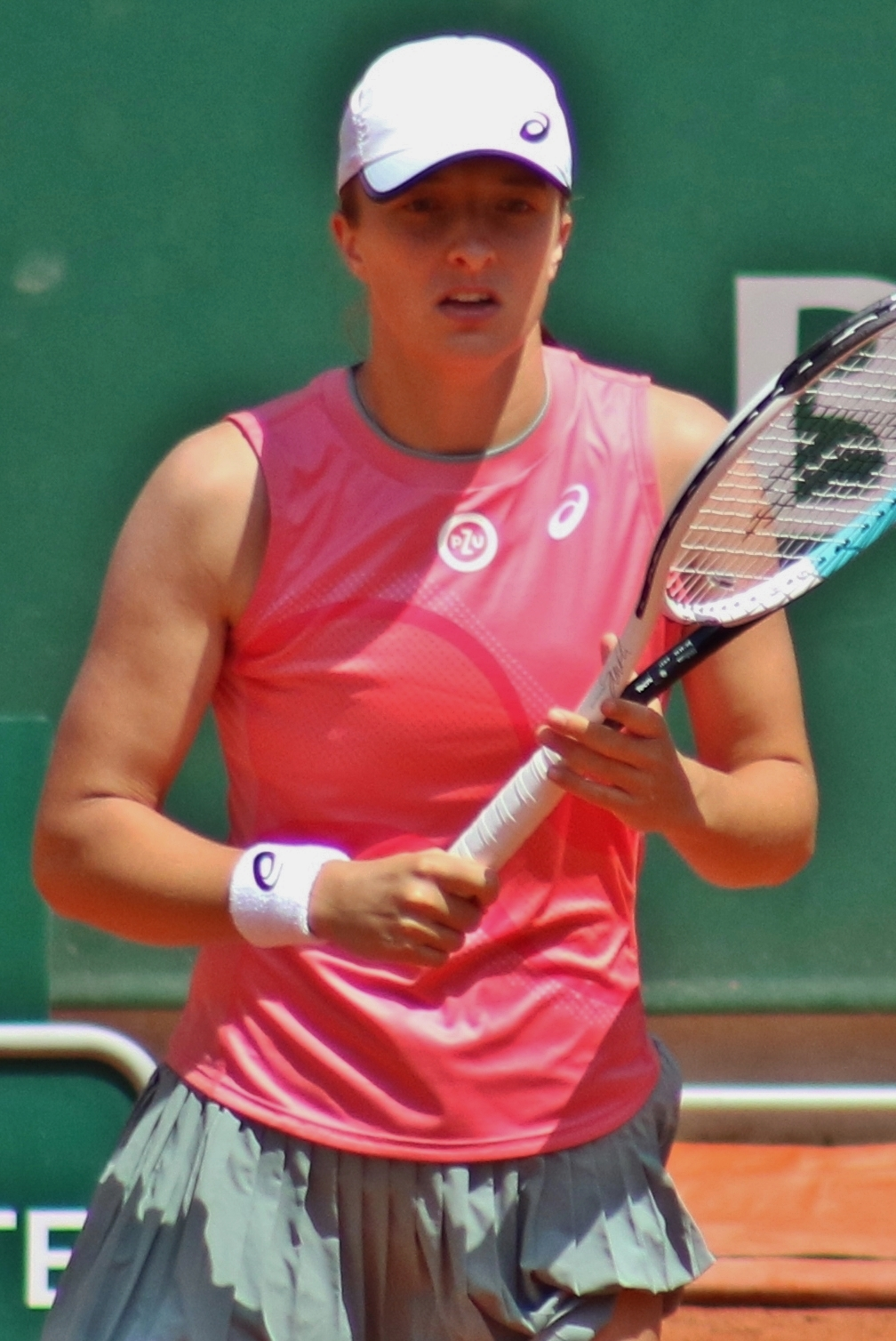
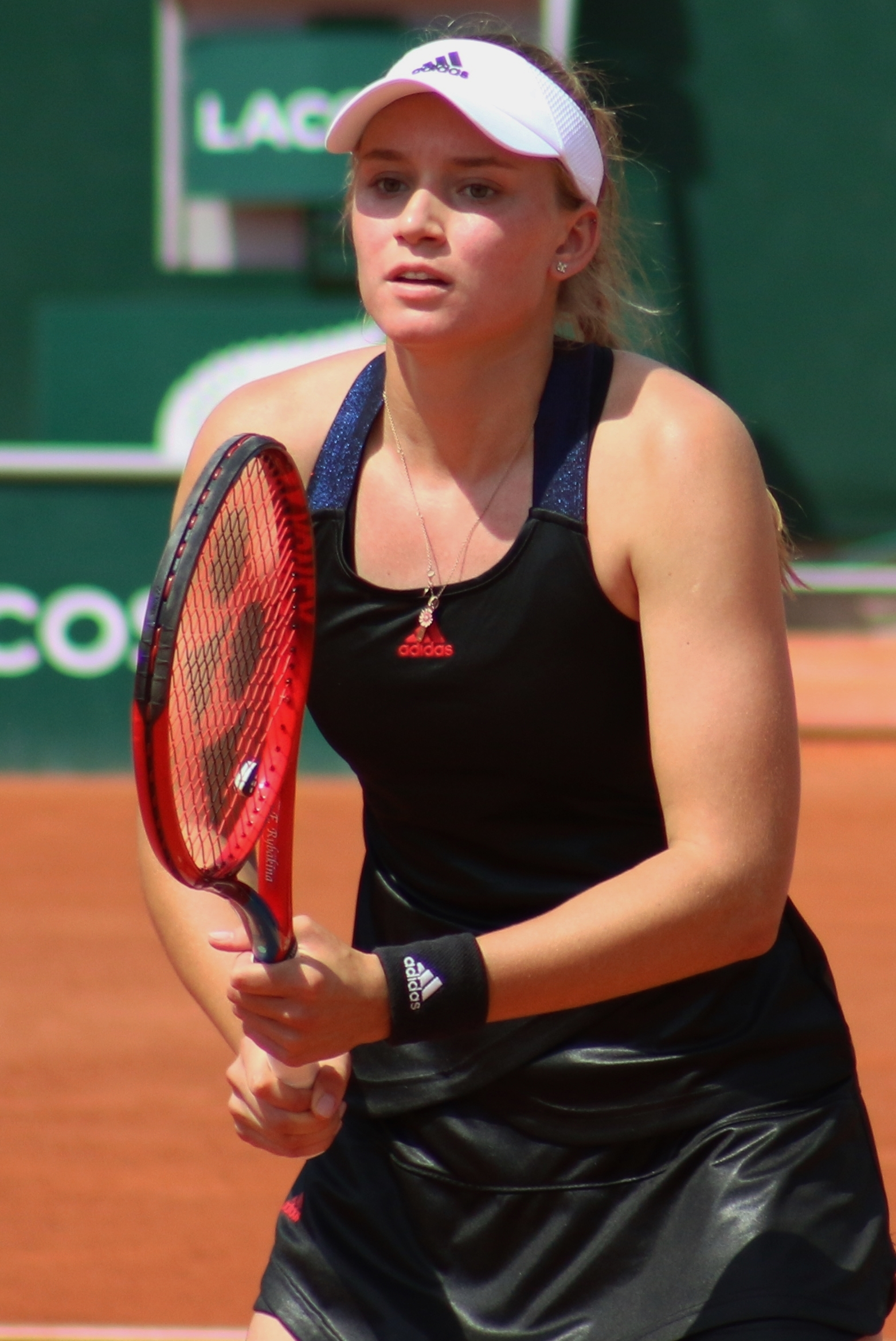
Ashleigh Barty won the Australian Open and announced her retirement from professional tennis in March. Iga Świątek won the French Open and US Open titles, and Elena Rybakina was the Wimbledon champion.

== Schedule ==
This is the complete schedule of events on the 2022 calendar.

Key

Grand Slam tournaments
Year-end championships
WTA 1000 (Mandatory) (Note: These tournaments are still distributed by points: 1000 points (WTA 1000; mandatory); 900 points (WTA 1000; non-mandatory); 470 points (WTA 500); 280 points (WTA 250))
WTA 1000 (non-Mandatory)
WTA 500
WTA 250
Team events

=== January ===
Week	Tournament	Champions	Runners-up	Semifinalists	Quarterfinalists
3 Jan	Adelaide International 1 Adelaide, Australia; WTA 500; Hard – $703,580 – 30S/24Q/16D; Singles – Doubles	(Australia) Ashleigh Barty; 6–3, 6–2	(Kazakhstan) Elena Rybakina	(Poland) Iga Świątek (Japan) Misaki Doi	(United States) Sofia Kenin (Belarus) Victoria Azarenka (United States) Shelby Rogers (Slovenia) Kaja Juvan
3 Jan	Adelaide International 1 Adelaide, Australia; WTA 500; Hard – $703,580 – 30S/24Q/16D; Singles – Doubles	(Australia) Ashleigh Barty (Australia) Storm Sanders; 6–1, 6–4	(Croatia) Darija Jurak Schreiber (Slovenia) Andreja Klepač	(Poland) Iga Świątek (Japan) Misaki Doi	(United States) Sofia Kenin (Belarus) Victoria Azarenka (United States) Shelby Rogers (Slovenia) Kaja Juvan
3 Jan	Melbourne Summer Set 1 Melbourne, Australia; WTA 250; Hard – $239,477 – 32S/24Q/16D; Singles – Doubles	(Romania) Simona Halep; 6–2, 6–3	(Russia) Veronika Kudermetova	(Japan) Naomi Osaka (China) Zheng Qinwen	(Germany) Andrea Petkovic (Russia) Anastasia Potapova (Croatia) Ana Konjuh (Switzerland) Viktorija Golubic
3 Jan	Melbourne Summer Set 1 Melbourne, Australia; WTA 250; Hard – $239,477 – 32S/24Q/16D; Singles – Doubles	(United States) Asia Muhammad (United States) Jessica Pegula; 6–3, 6–1	(Italy) Sara Errani (Italy) Jasmine Paolini	(Japan) Naomi Osaka (China) Zheng Qinwen	(Germany) Andrea Petkovic (Russia) Anastasia Potapova (Croatia) Ana Konjuh (Switzerland) Viktorija Golubic
3 Jan	Melbourne Summer Set 2 Melbourne, Australia; WTA 250; Hard – $239,477 – 32S/24Q/16D; Singles – Doubles	(United States) Amanda Anisimova; 7–5, 1–6, 6–4	(Belarus) Aliaksandra Sasnovich	(Russia) Daria Kasatkina (United States) Ann Li	(Romania) Irina-Camelia Begu (Spain) Nuria Párrizas Díaz (Russia) Kamilla Rakhimova (Denmark) Clara Tauson
3 Jan	Melbourne Summer Set 2 Melbourne, Australia; WTA 250; Hard – $239,477 – 32S/24Q/16D; Singles – Doubles	(United States) Bernarda Pera (Czech Republic) Kateřina Siniaková; 6–2, 6–7^{(7–9)}, [10–5]	(Czech Republic) Tereza Martincová (Egypt) Mayar Sherif	(Russia) Daria Kasatkina (United States) Ann Li	(Romania) Irina-Camelia Begu (Spain) Nuria Párrizas Díaz (Russia) Kamilla Rakhimova (Denmark) Clara Tauson
10 Jan	Sydney International; Sydney, Australia; WTA 500; Hard – $703,580 – 30S/24Q/16D; Singles – Doubles	(Spain) Paula Badosa; 6–3, 4–6, 7–6^{(7–4)}	(Czech Republic) Barbora Krejčíková	(Estonia) Anett Kontaveit (Russia) Daria Kasatkina	(France) Caroline Garcia (Tunisia) Ons Jabeur (Switzerland) Belinda Bencic (Spain) Garbiñe Muguruza
10 Jan	Sydney International; Sydney, Australia; WTA 500; Hard – $703,580 – 30S/24Q/16D; Singles – Doubles	(Kazakhstan) Anna Danilina (Brazil) Beatriz Haddad Maia; 4–6, 7–5, [10–8]	(Germany) Vivian Heisen (Hungary) Panna Udvardy	(Estonia) Anett Kontaveit (Russia) Daria Kasatkina	(France) Caroline Garcia (Tunisia) Ons Jabeur (Switzerland) Belinda Bencic (Spain) Garbiñe Muguruza
10 Jan	Adelaide International 2 Adelaide, Australia; WTA 250; Hard – $239,477 – 32S/24Q/16D; Singles – Doubles	(United States) Madison Keys; 6–1, 6–2	(United States) Alison Riske	(Slovenia) Tamara Zidanšek (United States) Coco Gauff	(United States) Madison Brengle (United States) Lauren Davis (Croatia) Ana Konjuh (Russia) Liudmila Samsonova
10 Jan	Adelaide International 2 Adelaide, Australia; WTA 250; Hard – $239,477 – 32S/24Q/16D; Singles – Doubles	(Japan) Eri Hozumi (Japan) Makoto Ninomiya; 1–6, 7–6^{(7–4)}, [10–7]	(Czech Republic) Tereza Martincová (Czech Republic) Markéta Vondroušová	(Slovenia) Tamara Zidanšek (United States) Coco Gauff	(United States) Madison Brengle (United States) Lauren Davis (Croatia) Ana Konjuh (Russia) Liudmila Samsonova
17 Jan; 24 Jan	Australian Open; Melbourne, Australia; Grand Slam; Hard – A$33,784,200; 128S/128Q/64D/32X; Singles – Doubles – Mixed	(Australia) Ashleigh Barty; 6–3, 7–6^{(7–2)}	(United States) Danielle Collins	(United States) Madison Keys (Poland) Iga Świątek	(United States) Jessica Pegula (Czech Republic) Barbora Krejčíková (France) Alizé Cornet (Estonia) Kaia Kanepi
17 Jan; 24 Jan	Australian Open; Melbourne, Australia; Grand Slam; Hard – A$33,784,200; 128S/128Q/64D/32X; Singles – Doubles – Mixed	(Czech Republic) Barbora Krejčíková (Czech Republic) Kateřina Siniaková; 6–7^{(3–7)}, 6–4, 6–4	(Kazakhstan) Anna Danilina (Brazil) Beatriz Haddad Maia	(United States) Madison Keys (Poland) Iga Świątek	(United States) Jessica Pegula (Czech Republic) Barbora Krejčíková (France) Alizé Cornet (Estonia) Kaia Kanepi
17 Jan; 24 Jan	Australian Open; Melbourne, Australia; Grand Slam; Hard – A$33,784,200; 128S/128Q/64D/32X; Singles – Doubles – Mixed	(France) Kristina Mladenovic (Croatia) Ivan Dodig; 6–3, 6–4	(Australia) Jaimee Fourlis (Australia) Jason Kubler	(United States) Madison Keys (Poland) Iga Świątek	(United States) Jessica Pegula (Czech Republic) Barbora Krejčíková (France) Alizé Cornet (Estonia) Kaia Kanepi
31 Jan	No tournaments scheduled				

=== February ===
Week	Tournament	Champions	Runners-up	Semifinalists	Quarterfinalists
7 Feb	St. Petersburg Ladies' Trophy; St. Petersburg, Russia; WTA 500; Hard (i) – $703,580 – 32S/32Q/16D; Singles – Doubles	(Estonia) Anett Kontaveit; 5–7, 7–6^{(7–4)}, 7–5	(Greece) Maria Sakkari	(Romania) Irina-Camelia Begu (Latvia) Jeļena Ostapenko	(Belgium) Elise Mertens (Czech Republic) Tereza Martincová (Belarus) Aliaksandra Sasnovich (Switzerland) Belinda Bencic
7 Feb	St. Petersburg Ladies' Trophy; St. Petersburg, Russia; WTA 500; Hard (i) – $703,580 – 32S/32Q/16D; Singles – Doubles	(Russia) Anna Kalinskaya (United States) Caty McNally; 6–3, 6–7^{(5–7)}, [10–4]	(Poland) Alicja Rosolska (New Zealand) Erin Routliffe	(Romania) Irina-Camelia Begu (Latvia) Jeļena Ostapenko	(Belgium) Elise Mertens (Czech Republic) Tereza Martincová (Belarus) Aliaksandra Sasnovich (Switzerland) Belinda Bencic
14 Feb	Dubai Tennis Championships; Dubai, United Arab Emirates; WTA 500; Hard – $703,580 – 32S/48Q/16D; Singles – Doubles	(Latvia) Jeļena Ostapenko; 6–0, 6–4	(Russia) Veronika Kudermetova	(Romania) Simona Halep (Czech Republic) Markéta Vondroušová	(Czech Republic) Petra Kvitová (Tunisia) Ons Jabeur (Switzerland) Jil Teichmann (Ukraine) Dayana Yastremska
14 Feb	Dubai Tennis Championships; Dubai, United Arab Emirates; WTA 500; Hard – $703,580 – 32S/48Q/16D; Singles – Doubles	(Russia) Veronika Kudermetova (Belgium) Elise Mertens; 6–1, 6–3	(Ukraine) Lyudmyla Kichenok (Latvia) Jeļena Ostapenko	(Romania) Simona Halep (Czech Republic) Markéta Vondroušová	(Czech Republic) Petra Kvitová (Tunisia) Ons Jabeur (Switzerland) Jil Teichmann (Ukraine) Dayana Yastremska
21 Feb	Qatar Open; Doha, Qatar; WTA 1000 (Non-mandatory); Hard – $2,331,698 – 56S/32Q/28D; Singles – Doubles	(Poland) Iga Świątek; 6–2, 6–0	(Estonia) Anett Kontaveit	(Greece) Maria Sakkari (Latvia) Jeļena Ostapenko	(Belarus) Aryna Sabalenka (United States) Coco Gauff (Tunisia) Ons Jabeur (Spain) Garbiñe Muguruza
21 Feb	Qatar Open; Doha, Qatar; WTA 1000 (Non-mandatory); Hard – $2,331,698 – 56S/32Q/28D; Singles – Doubles	(United States) Coco Gauff (United States) Jessica Pegula; 3–6, 7–5, [10–5]	(Russia) Veronika Kudermetova (Belgium) Elise Mertens	(Greece) Maria Sakkari (Latvia) Jeļena Ostapenko	(Belarus) Aryna Sabalenka (United States) Coco Gauff (Tunisia) Ons Jabeur (Spain) Garbiñe Muguruza
21 Feb	Abierto Zapopan; Guadalajara, Mexico; WTA 250; Hard – $239,477 – 32S/24Q/16D; Singles – Doubles	(United States) Sloane Stephens; 7–5, 1–6, 6–2	(Czech Republic) Marie Bouzková	(Russia) Anna Kalinskaya (China) Wang Qiang	(Australia) Daria Saville (Colombia) Camila Osorio (Spain) Sara Sorribes Tormo (Slovakia) Anna Karolína Schmiedlová
21 Feb	Abierto Zapopan; Guadalajara, Mexico; WTA 250; Hard – $239,477 – 32S/24Q/16D; Singles – Doubles	(United States) Kaitlyn Christian (Belarus) Lidziya Marozava; 7–5, 6–3	(China) Wang Xinyu (China) Zhu Lin	(Russia) Anna Kalinskaya (China) Wang Qiang	(Australia) Daria Saville (Colombia) Camila Osorio (Spain) Sara Sorribes Tormo (Slovakia) Anna Karolína Schmiedlová
28 Feb	Lyon Open; Lyon, France; WTA 250; Hard (i) – $239,477 – 32S/24Q/16D; Singles – Doubles	(China) Zhang Shuai; 3–6, 6–3, 6–4	(Ukraine) Dayana Yastremska	(France) Caroline Garcia (Romania) Sorana Cîrstea	(Belgium) Alison Van Uytvanck; Vitalia Diatchenko (Italy) Jasmine Paolini (Hungary) Anna Bondár
28 Feb	Lyon Open; Lyon, France; WTA 250; Hard (i) – $239,477 – 32S/24Q/16D; Singles – Doubles	(Germany) Laura Siegemund; Vera Zvonareva; 7–5, 6–1	(United Kingdom) Alicia Barnett (United Kingdom) Olivia Nicholls	(France) Caroline Garcia (Romania) Sorana Cîrstea	(Belgium) Alison Van Uytvanck; Vitalia Diatchenko (Italy) Jasmine Paolini (Hungary) Anna Bondár
28 Feb	Monterrey Open; Monterrey, Mexico; WTA 250; Hard – $239,477 – 32S/24Q/16D; Singles – Doubles	(Canada) Leylah Fernandez; 6–7^{(5–7)}, 6–4, 7–6^{(7–3)}	(Colombia) Camila Osorio	(Spain) Nuria Párrizas Díaz (Brazil) Beatriz Haddad Maia	(Ukraine) Elina Svitolina (Spain) Sara Sorribes Tormo (Czech Republic) Marie Bouzková (China) Wang Qiang
28 Feb	Monterrey Open; Monterrey, Mexico; WTA 250; Hard – $239,477 – 32S/24Q/16D; Singles – Doubles	(United States) Catherine Harrison (United States) Sabrina Santamaria; 1–6, 7–5, [10–6]	(China) Han Xinyun; Yana Sizikova	(Spain) Nuria Párrizas Díaz (Brazil) Beatriz Haddad Maia	(Ukraine) Elina Svitolina (Spain) Sara Sorribes Tormo (Czech Republic) Marie Bouzková (China) Wang Qiang

=== March ===
Week	Tournament	Champions	Runners-up	Semifinalists	Quarterfinalists
7 Mar; 14 Mar	Indian Wells Open; Indian Wells, United States; WTA 1000 (Mandatory); Hard – $8,369,455 – 96S/48Q/32D; Singles – Doubles	(Poland) Iga Świątek; 6–4, 6–1	(Greece) Maria Sakkari	(Romania) Simona Halep (Spain) Paula Badosa	(Croatia) Petra Martić (United States) Madison Keys; Veronika Kudermetova (Kazakhstan) Elena Rybakina
7 Mar; 14 Mar	Indian Wells Open; Indian Wells, United States; WTA 1000 (Mandatory); Hard – $8,369,455 – 96S/48Q/32D; Singles – Doubles	(China) Xu Yifan (China) Yang Zhaoxuan; 7–5, 7–6^{(7–4)}	(United States) Asia Muhammad (Japan) Ena Shibahara	(Romania) Simona Halep (Spain) Paula Badosa	(Croatia) Petra Martić (United States) Madison Keys; Veronika Kudermetova (Kazakhstan) Elena Rybakina
21 Mar; 28 Mar	Miami Open; Miami Gardens, United States; WTA 1000 (Mandatory); Hard – $8,369,455 – 96S/48Q/32D; Singles – Doubles	(Poland) Iga Świątek; 6–4, 6–0	(Japan) Naomi Osaka	(Switzerland) Belinda Bencic (United States) Jessica Pegula	(Australia) Daria Saville (United States) Danielle Collins (Spain) Paula Badosa (Czech Republic) Petra Kvitová
21 Mar; 28 Mar	Miami Open; Miami Gardens, United States; WTA 1000 (Mandatory); Hard – $8,369,455 – 96S/48Q/32D; Singles – Doubles	(Germany) Laura Siegemund; Vera Zvonareva; 7–6^{(7–3)}, 7–5	Veronika Kudermetova (Belgium) Elise Mertens	(Switzerland) Belinda Bencic (United States) Jessica Pegula	(Australia) Daria Saville (United States) Danielle Collins (Spain) Paula Badosa (Czech Republic) Petra Kvitová

=== April ===
Week	Tournament	Champions	Runners-up	Semifinalists	Quarterfinalists
4 Apr	Charleston Open; Charleston, United States; WTA 500; Clay – $899,500 (Green) – 56S/32Q/16D; Singles – Doubles	(Switzerland) Belinda Bencic; 6–1, 5–7, 6–4	(Tunisia) Ons Jabeur	(United States) Amanda Anisimova; Ekaterina Alexandrova	(United States) CoCo Vandeweghe (Ukraine) Anhelina Kalinina (Poland) Magda Linette (Spain) Paula Badosa
4 Apr	Charleston Open; Charleston, United States; WTA 500; Clay – $899,500 (Green) – 56S/32Q/16D; Singles – Doubles	(Slovenia) Andreja Klepač (Poland) Magda Linette; 6–2, 4–6, [10–7]	(Czech Republic) Lucie Hradecká (India) Sania Mirza	(United States) Amanda Anisimova; Ekaterina Alexandrova	(United States) CoCo Vandeweghe (Ukraine) Anhelina Kalinina (Poland) Magda Linette (Spain) Paula Badosa
4 Apr	Copa Colsanitas; Bogotá, Colombia; WTA 250; Clay (red) – $239,477 – 32S/24Q/16D; Singles – Doubles	(Germany) Tatjana Maria; 6–3, 4–6, 6–2	(Brazil) Laura Pigossi	(Colombia) Camila Osorio; Kamilla Rakhimova	Elina Avanesyan (Ukraine) Dayana Yastremska (Sweden) Mirjam Björklund (Romania) Irina Bara
4 Apr	Copa Colsanitas; Bogotá, Colombia; WTA 250; Clay (red) – $239,477 – 32S/24Q/16D; Singles – Doubles	(Australia) Astra Sharma (Indonesia) Aldila Sutjiadi; 4–6, 6–4, [11–9]	(United States) Emina Bektas (United Kingdom) Tara Moore	(Colombia) Camila Osorio; Kamilla Rakhimova	Elina Avanesyan (Ukraine) Dayana Yastremska (Sweden) Mirjam Björklund (Romania) Irina Bara
11 Apr	Billie Jean King Cup qualifying round Alghero, Italy – hard Asheville, United States – hard (i); Prague, Czech Republic – Clay; Antalya, Turkey; Nur-Sultan, Kazakhstan – Clay (i); Vancouver, Canada – hard (i) 's-Hertogenbosch, Netherlands – Clay (i); Radom, Poland – hard (i)	Qualifying round winners Italy, 3–1; United States, 3–2; Czech Republic, 3–2; Belgium, Walkover; Kazakhstan, 3–1; Canada, 4–0; Spain, 4–0; Poland, 4–0	Qualifying round losers France; Ukraine; Great Britain; Belarus; Germany; Latvia; Netherlands; Romania		
18 Apr	Stuttgart Open; Stuttgart, Germany; WTA 500; Clay (red) – $757,900 (i) – 28S/16Q/16D; Singles – Doubles	(Poland) Iga Świątek; 6–2, 6–2	Aryna Sabalenka	Liudmila Samsonova (Spain) Paula Badosa	(United Kingdom) Emma Raducanu (Germany) Laura Siegemund (Estonia) Anett Kontaveit (Tunisia) Ons Jabeur
18 Apr	Stuttgart Open; Stuttgart, Germany; WTA 500; Clay (red) – $757,900 (i) – 28S/16Q/16D; Singles – Doubles	(United States) Desirae Krawczyk (Netherlands) Demi Schuurs; 6–3, 6–4	(United States) Coco Gauff (China) Zhang Shuai	Liudmila Samsonova (Spain) Paula Badosa	(United Kingdom) Emma Raducanu (Germany) Laura Siegemund (Estonia) Anett Kontaveit (Tunisia) Ons Jabeur
18 Apr	İstanbul Cup; Istanbul, Turkey; WTA 250; Clay (red) – $251,750 – 32S/24Q/16D; Singles – Doubles	Anastasia Potapova; 6–3, 6–1	Veronika Kudermetova	(Kazakhstan) Yulia Putintseva (Romania) Sorana Cîrstea	(Australia) Ajla Tomljanović (Spain) Sara Sorribes Tormo (Hungary) Anna Bondár (Austria) Julia Grabher
18 Apr	İstanbul Cup; Istanbul, Turkey; WTA 250; Clay (red) – $251,750 – 32S/24Q/16D; Singles – Doubles	(Czech Republic) Marie Bouzková (Spain) Sara Sorribes Tormo; 6–3, 6–4	Natela Dzalamidze; Kamilla Rakhimova	(Kazakhstan) Yulia Putintseva (Romania) Sorana Cîrstea	(Australia) Ajla Tomljanović (Spain) Sara Sorribes Tormo (Hungary) Anna Bondár (Austria) Julia Grabher
25 Apr; 2 May	Madrid Open; Madrid, Spain; WTA 1000 (Mandatory); Clay (red) – $6,575,560 – 64S/48Q/30D; Singles – Doubles	(Tunisia) Ons Jabeur; 7–5, 0–6, 6–2	(United States) Jessica Pegula	(Switzerland) Jil Teichmann; Ekaterina Alexandrova	(Ukraine) Anhelina Kalinina (Spain) Sara Sorribes Tormo (United States) Amanda Anisimova (Romania) Simona Halep
25 Apr; 2 May	Madrid Open; Madrid, Spain; WTA 1000 (Mandatory); Clay (red) – $6,575,560 – 64S/48Q/30D; Singles – Doubles	(Canada) Gabriela Dabrowski (Mexico) Giuliana Olmos; 7–6^{(7–1)}, 5–7, [10–7]	(United States) Desirae Krawczyk (Netherlands) Demi Schuurs	(Switzerland) Jil Teichmann; Ekaterina Alexandrova	(Ukraine) Anhelina Kalinina (Spain) Sara Sorribes Tormo (United States) Amanda Anisimova (Romania) Simona Halep

=== May ===
Week	Tournament	Champions	Runners-up	Semifinalists	Quarterfinalists
9 May	Italian Open; Rome, Italy; WTA 1000 (Non-mandatory); Clay (red) – $2,527,250 – 56S/32Q/28D; Singles – Doubles	(Poland) Iga Świątek; 6–2, 6–2	(Tunisia) Ons Jabeur	Aryna Sabalenka; Daria Kasatkina	(Canada) Bianca Andreescu (United States) Amanda Anisimova (Greece) Maria Sakkari (Switzerland) Jil Teichmann
9 May	Italian Open; Rome, Italy; WTA 1000 (Non-mandatory); Clay (red) – $2,527,250 – 56S/32Q/28D; Singles – Doubles	Veronika Kudermetova; Anastasia Pavlyuchenkova; 1–6, 6–4, [10–7]	(Canada) Gabriela Dabrowski (Mexico) Giuliana Olmos	Aryna Sabalenka; Daria Kasatkina	(Canada) Bianca Andreescu (United States) Amanda Anisimova (Greece) Maria Sakkari (Switzerland) Jil Teichmann
16 May	Morocco Open; Rabat, Morocco; WTA 250; Clay (red) – $251,750 – 32S/16Q/16D; Singles – Doubles	(Italy) Martina Trevisan; 6–2, 6–1	(United States) Claire Liu	(Italy) Lucia Bronzetti (Hungary) Anna Bondár	(Netherlands) Arantxa Rus (Spain) Nuria Párrizas Díaz (Australia) Astra Sharma (Australia) Ajla Tomljanović
16 May	Morocco Open; Rabat, Morocco; WTA 250; Clay (red) – $251,750 – 32S/16Q/16D; Singles – Doubles	(Japan) Eri Hozumi (Japan) Makoto Ninomiya; 6–7^{(7–9)}, 6–3, [10–8]	(Romania) Monica Niculescu; Alexandra Panova	(Italy) Lucia Bronzetti (Hungary) Anna Bondár	(Netherlands) Arantxa Rus (Spain) Nuria Párrizas Díaz (Australia) Astra Sharma (Australia) Ajla Tomljanović
16 May	Internationaux de Strasbourg; Strasbourg, France; WTA 250; Clay (red) – $251,750 – 32S/16Q/16D; Singles – Doubles	(Germany) Angelique Kerber; 7–6^{(7–5)}, 6–7^{(0–7)}, 7–6^{(7–5)}	(Slovenia) Kaja Juvan	(Czech Republic) Karolína Plíšková (France) Océane Dodin	(Belgium) Maryna Zanevska (Belgium) Elise Mertens (Switzerland) Viktorija Golubic (Poland) Magda Linette
16 May	Internationaux de Strasbourg; Strasbourg, France; WTA 250; Clay (red) – $251,750 – 32S/16Q/16D; Singles – Doubles	(United States) Nicole Melichar-Martinez (Australia) Daria Saville; 5–7, 7–5, [10–6]	(Czech Republic) Lucie Hradecká (India) Sania Mirza	(Czech Republic) Karolína Plíšková (France) Océane Dodin	(Belgium) Maryna Zanevska (Belgium) Elise Mertens (Switzerland) Viktorija Golubic (Poland) Magda Linette
23 May; 30 May	French Open; Paris, France; Grand Slam; Clay (red) – €21,256,800; 128S/128Q/64D/32X; Singles – Doubles – Mixed	(Poland) Iga Świątek; 6–1, 6–3	(United States) Coco Gauff	Daria Kasatkina (Italy) Martina Trevisan	(United States) Jessica Pegula; Veronika Kudermetova (Canada) Leylah Fernandez (United States) Sloane Stephens
23 May; 30 May	French Open; Paris, France; Grand Slam; Clay (red) – €21,256,800; 128S/128Q/64D/32X; Singles – Doubles – Mixed	(France) Caroline Garcia (France) Kristina Mladenovic; 2–6, 6–3, 6–2	(United States) Coco Gauff (United States) Jessica Pegula	Daria Kasatkina (Italy) Martina Trevisan	(United States) Jessica Pegula; Veronika Kudermetova (Canada) Leylah Fernandez (United States) Sloane Stephens
23 May; 30 May	French Open; Paris, France; Grand Slam; Clay (red) – €21,256,800; 128S/128Q/64D/32X; Singles – Doubles – Mixed	(Japan) Ena Shibahara (Netherlands) Wesley Koolhof; 7–6^{(7–5)}, 6–2	(Norway) Ulrikke Eikeri (Belgium) Joran Vliegen	Daria Kasatkina (Italy) Martina Trevisan	(United States) Jessica Pegula; Veronika Kudermetova (Canada) Leylah Fernandez (United States) Sloane Stephens

=== June ===
Week	Tournament	Champions	Runners-up	Semifinalists	Quarterfinalists
6 Jun	Rosmalen Open; Rosmalen, Netherlands; WTA 250; Grass – $251,750 – 32S/24Q/16D; Singles – Doubles	Ekaterina Alexandrova; 7–5, 6–0	Aryna Sabalenka	(United States) Shelby Rogers; Veronika Kudermetova	(Belgium) Alison Van Uytvanck (Belgium) Kirsten Flipkens (United States) Caty McNally (Switzerland) Belinda Bencic
6 Jun	Rosmalen Open; Rosmalen, Netherlands; WTA 250; Grass – $251,750 – 32S/24Q/16D; Singles – Doubles	(Australia) Ellen Perez (Slovenia) Tamara Zidanšek; 6–3, 5–7, [12–10]	Veronika Kudermetova (Belgium) Elise Mertens	(United States) Shelby Rogers; Veronika Kudermetova	(Belgium) Alison Van Uytvanck (Belgium) Kirsten Flipkens (United States) Caty McNally (Switzerland) Belinda Bencic
6 Jun	Nottingham Open; Nottingham, United Kingdom; WTA 250; Grass – $251,750 – 32S/24Q/16D; Singles – Doubles	(Brazil) Beatriz Haddad Maia; 6–4, 1–6, 6–3	(United States) Alison Riske	(Czech Republic) Tereza Martincová (Switzerland) Viktorija Golubic	(Greece) Maria Sakkari (China) Zhang Shuai (United Kingdom) Harriet Dart (Australia) Ajla Tomljanović
6 Jun	Nottingham Open; Nottingham, United Kingdom; WTA 250; Grass – $251,750 – 32S/24Q/16D; Singles – Doubles	(Brazil) Beatriz Haddad Maia (China) Zhang Shuai; 7–6^{(7–2)}, 6–3	(United States) Caroline Dolehide (Romania) Monica Niculescu	(Czech Republic) Tereza Martincová (Switzerland) Viktorija Golubic	(Greece) Maria Sakkari (China) Zhang Shuai (United Kingdom) Harriet Dart (Australia) Ajla Tomljanović
13 Jun	German Open; Berlin, Germany; WTA 500; Grass – $757,900 – 32S/24Q/16D; Singles – Doubles	(Tunisia) Ons Jabeur; 6–3, 2–1, ret.	(Switzerland) Belinda Bencic	(United States) Coco Gauff (Greece) Maria Sakkari	Aliaksandra Sasnovich (Czech Republic) Karolína Plíšková; Veronika Kudermetova; Daria Kasatkina
13 Jun	German Open; Berlin, Germany; WTA 500; Grass – $757,900 – 32S/24Q/16D; Singles – Doubles	(Australia) Storm Sanders (Czech Republic) Kateřina Siniaková; 6–4, 6–3	(France) Alizé Cornet (Switzerland) Jil Teichmann	(United States) Coco Gauff (Greece) Maria Sakkari	Aliaksandra Sasnovich (Czech Republic) Karolína Plíšková; Veronika Kudermetova; Daria Kasatkina
13 Jun	Birmingham Classic; Birmingham, United Kingdom; WTA 250; Grass – $251,750 – 32S/24Q/16D; Singles – Doubles	(Brazil) Beatriz Haddad Maia; 5–4, ret.	(China) Zhang Shuai	(Romania) Sorana Cîrstea (Romania) Simona Halep	(Ukraine) Dayana Yastremska (Croatia) Donna Vekić (Italy) Camila Giorgi (United Kingdom) Katie Boulter
13 Jun	Birmingham Classic; Birmingham, United Kingdom; WTA 250; Grass – $251,750 – 32S/24Q/16D; Singles – Doubles	(Ukraine) Lyudmyla Kichenok (Latvia) Jeļena Ostapenko; Walkover	(Belgium) Elise Mertens (China) Zhang Shuai	(Romania) Sorana Cîrstea (Romania) Simona Halep	(Ukraine) Dayana Yastremska (Croatia) Donna Vekić (Italy) Camila Giorgi (United Kingdom) Katie Boulter
20 Jun	Eastbourne International; Eastbourne, United Kingdom; WTA 500; Grass – $757,900 – 48S/16Q/16D; Singles – Doubles	(Czech Republic) Petra Kvitová; 6–3, 6–2	(Latvia) Jeļena Ostapenko	(Brazil) Beatriz Haddad Maia (Italy) Camila Giorgi	(Ukraine) Lesia Tsurenko (United Kingdom) Harriet Dart (Ukraine) Anhelina Kalinina (Bulgaria) Viktoriya Tomova
20 Jun	Eastbourne International; Eastbourne, United Kingdom; WTA 500; Grass – $757,900 – 48S/16Q/16D; Singles – Doubles	(Serbia) Aleksandra Krunić (Poland) Magda Linette; Walkover	(Ukraine) Lyudmyla Kichenok (Latvia) Jeļena Ostapenko	(Brazil) Beatriz Haddad Maia (Italy) Camila Giorgi	(Ukraine) Lesia Tsurenko (United Kingdom) Harriet Dart (Ukraine) Anhelina Kalinina (Bulgaria) Viktoriya Tomova
20 Jun	Bad Homburg Open; Bad Homburg, Germany; WTA 250; Grass – $251,750 – 32S/8Q/16D; Singles – Doubles	(France) Caroline Garcia; 6–7^{(5–7)}, 6–4, 6–4	(Canada) Bianca Andreescu	(Romania) Simona Halep (France) Alizé Cornet	Daria Kasatkina (United States) Amanda Anisimova (Germany) Angelique Kerber (Germany) Sabine Lisicki
20 Jun	Bad Homburg Open; Bad Homburg, Germany; WTA 250; Grass – $251,750 – 32S/8Q/16D; Singles – Doubles	(Japan) Eri Hozumi (Japan) Makoto Ninomiya; 6–4, 6–7^{(5–7)}, [10–5]	(Poland) Alicja Rosolska (New Zealand) Erin Routliffe	(Romania) Simona Halep (France) Alizé Cornet	Daria Kasatkina (United States) Amanda Anisimova (Germany) Angelique Kerber (Germany) Sabine Lisicki
27 Jun; 4 Jul	Wimbledon; London, United Kingdom; Grand Slam; Grass – £35,016,000; 128S/128Q/64D/32X; Singles – Doubles – Mixed	(Kazakhstan) Elena Rybakina; 3–6, 6–2, 6–2	(Tunisia) Ons Jabeur	(Romania) Simona Halep (Germany) Tatjana Maria	(Australia) Ajla Tomljanović (United States) Amanda Anisimova (Czech Republic) Marie Bouzková (Germany) Jule Niemeier
27 Jun; 4 Jul	Wimbledon; London, United Kingdom; Grand Slam; Grass – £35,016,000; 128S/128Q/64D/32X; Singles – Doubles – Mixed	(Czech Republic) Barbora Krejčíková (Czech Republic) Kateřina Siniaková; 6–2, 6–4	(Belgium) Elise Mertens (China) Zhang Shuai	(Romania) Simona Halep (Germany) Tatjana Maria	(Australia) Ajla Tomljanović (United States) Amanda Anisimova (Czech Republic) Marie Bouzková (Germany) Jule Niemeier
27 Jun; 4 Jul	Wimbledon; London, United Kingdom; Grand Slam; Grass – £35,016,000; 128S/128Q/64D/32X; Singles – Doubles – Mixed	(United Kingdom) Neal Skupski (United States) Desirae Krawczyk; 6–4, 6–3	(Australia) Matthew Ebden (Australia) Samantha Stosur	(Romania) Simona Halep (Germany) Tatjana Maria	(Australia) Ajla Tomljanović (United States) Amanda Anisimova (Czech Republic) Marie Bouzková (Germany) Jule Niemeier

=== July ===
Week	Tournament	Champions	Runners-up	Semifinalists	Quarterfinalists
11 Jul	Swiss Open; Lausanne, Switzerland; WTA 250; Clay (red) – $251,750 – 32S/24Q/16D; Singles – Doubles	(Croatia) Petra Martić; 6–4, 6–2	(Serbia) Olga Danilović	Anastasia Potapova (France) Caroline Garcia	(Switzerland) Simona Waltert (Germany) Jule Niemeier (Spain) Sara Sorribes Tormo (Switzerland) Belinda Bencic
11 Jul	Swiss Open; Lausanne, Switzerland; WTA 250; Clay (red) – $251,750 – 32S/24Q/16D; Singles – Doubles	(Serbia) Olga Danilović (France) Kristina Mladenovic; Walkover	(Norway) Ulrikke Eikeri (Slovenia) Tamara Zidanšek	Anastasia Potapova (France) Caroline Garcia	(Switzerland) Simona Waltert (Germany) Jule Niemeier (Spain) Sara Sorribes Tormo (Switzerland) Belinda Bencic
11 Jul	Budapest Grand Prix; Budapest, Hungary; WTA 250; Clay (red) – $251,750 – 32S/24Q/16D; Singles – Doubles	(United States) Bernarda Pera; 6–3, 6–3	(Serbia) Aleksandra Krunić	(Kazakhstan) Yulia Putintseva (Hungary) Anna Bondár	(China) Wang Xiyu (Ukraine) Lesia Tsurenko (Italy) Elisabetta Cocciaretto (Italy) Martina Trevisan
11 Jul	Budapest Grand Prix; Budapest, Hungary; WTA 250; Clay (red) – $251,750 – 32S/24Q/16D; Singles – Doubles	(Georgia (country)) Ekaterine Gorgodze (Georgia (country)) Oksana Kalashnikova; 1–6, 6–4, [10–6]	(Poland) Katarzyna Piter (Belgium) Kimberley Zimmermann	(Kazakhstan) Yulia Putintseva (Hungary) Anna Bondár	(China) Wang Xiyu (Ukraine) Lesia Tsurenko (Italy) Elisabetta Cocciaretto (Italy) Martina Trevisan
18 Jul	Hamburg European Open; Hamburg, Germany; WTA 250; Clay (red) – $251,750 – 32S/24Q/16D; Singles – Doubles	(United States) Bernarda Pera; 6–2, 6–4	(Estonia) Anett Kontaveit	Anastasia Potapova (Belgium) Maryna Zanevska	(Germany) Andrea Petkovic (Czech Republic) Barbora Krejčíková; Aliaksandra Sasnovich (Czech Republic) Kateřina Siniaková
18 Jul	Hamburg European Open; Hamburg, Germany; WTA 250; Clay (red) – $251,750 – 32S/24Q/16D; Singles – Doubles	(United States) Sophie Chang (United States) Angela Kulikov; 6–3, 4–6, [10–6]	(Japan) Miyu Kato (Indonesia) Aldila Sutjiadi	Anastasia Potapova (Belgium) Maryna Zanevska	(Germany) Andrea Petkovic (Czech Republic) Barbora Krejčíková; Aliaksandra Sasnovich (Czech Republic) Kateřina Siniaková
18 Jul	Palermo International; Palermo, Italy; WTA 250; Clay (red) – $251,750 – 32S/24Q/16D; Singles – Doubles	(Romania) Irina-Camelia Begu; 6–2, 6–2	(Italy) Lucia Bronzetti	(Italy) Jasmine Paolini (Spain) Sara Sorribes Tormo	(France) Caroline Garcia (Spain) Nuria Párrizas Díaz (Hungary) Anna Bondár (France) Diane Parry
18 Jul	Palermo International; Palermo, Italy; WTA 250; Clay (red) – $251,750 – 32S/24Q/16D; Singles – Doubles	(Hungary) Anna Bondár (Belgium) Kimberley Zimmermann; 6–3, 6–2	Amina Anshba (Hungary) Panna Udvardy	(Italy) Jasmine Paolini (Spain) Sara Sorribes Tormo	(France) Caroline Garcia (Spain) Nuria Párrizas Díaz (Hungary) Anna Bondár (France) Diane Parry
25 Jul	Poland Open; Warsaw, Poland; WTA 250; Clay (red) – $251,750 – 32S/24Q/16D; Singles – Doubles	(France) Caroline Garcia; 6–4, 6–1	(Romania) Ana Bogdan	(Italy) Jasmine Paolini (Ukraine) Kateryna Baindl	(Poland) Iga Świątek (Switzerland) Viktorija Golubic (Croatia) Petra Martić (Brazil) Laura Pigossi
25 Jul	Poland Open; Warsaw, Poland; WTA 250; Clay (red) – $251,750 – 32S/24Q/16D; Singles – Doubles	(Kazakhstan) Anna Danilina (Germany) Anna-Lena Friedsam; 6–4, 5–7, [10–5]	(Poland) Katarzyna Kawa (Poland) Alicja Rosolska	(Italy) Jasmine Paolini (Ukraine) Kateryna Baindl	(Poland) Iga Świątek (Switzerland) Viktorija Golubic (Croatia) Petra Martić (Brazil) Laura Pigossi
25 Jul	Prague Open; Prague, Czech Republic; WTA 250; Hard – $251,750 – 32S/24Q/16D; Singles – Doubles	(Czech Republic) Marie Bouzková; 6–0, 6–3	Anastasia Potapova	(China) Wang Qiang (Czech Republic) Linda Nosková	(Estonia) Anett Kontaveit (Poland) Magda Linette; Oksana Selekhmeteva (Japan) Nao Hibino
25 Jul	Prague Open; Prague, Czech Republic; WTA 250; Hard – $251,750 – 32S/24Q/16D; Singles – Doubles	Anastasia Potapova; Yana Sizikova; 6–3, 6–4	Angelina Gabueva; Anastasia Zakharova	(China) Wang Qiang (Czech Republic) Linda Nosková	(Estonia) Anett Kontaveit (Poland) Magda Linette; Oksana Selekhmeteva (Japan) Nao Hibino

=== August ===
Week	Tournament	Champions	Runners-up	Semifinalists	Quarterfinalists
1 Aug	Silicon Valley Classic; San Jose, United States; WTA 500; Hard – $757,900 – 28S/24Q/16D; Singles – Doubles	Daria Kasatkina; 6–7^{(2–7)}, 6–1, 6–2	(United States) Shelby Rogers	Veronika Kudermetova (Spain) Paula Badosa	(United States) Amanda Anisimova (Tunisia) Ons Jabeur; Aryna Sabalenka (United States) Coco Gauff
1 Aug	Silicon Valley Classic; San Jose, United States; WTA 500; Hard – $757,900 – 28S/24Q/16D; Singles – Doubles	(China) Xu Yifan (China) Yang Zhaoxuan; 7–5, 6–0	(Japan) Shuko Aoyama (Chinese Taipei) Chan Hao-ching	Veronika Kudermetova (Spain) Paula Badosa	(United States) Amanda Anisimova (Tunisia) Ons Jabeur; Aryna Sabalenka (United States) Coco Gauff
1 Aug	Washington Open; Washington, D.C., United States; WTA 250; Hard – $251,750 – 32S/16Q/16D; Singles – Doubles	Liudmila Samsonova; 4–6, 6–3, 6–3	(Estonia) Kaia Kanepi	(Australia) Daria Saville (China) Wang Xiyu	(Canada) Rebecca Marino; Anna Kalinskaya; Victoria Azarenka (United Kingdom) Emma Raducanu
1 Aug	Washington Open; Washington, D.C., United States; WTA 250; Hard – $251,750 – 32S/16Q/16D; Singles – Doubles	(United States) Jessica Pegula (New Zealand) Erin Routliffe; 6–3, 5–7, [12–10]	Anna Kalinskaya (United States) Caty McNally	(Australia) Daria Saville (China) Wang Xiyu	(Canada) Rebecca Marino; Anna Kalinskaya; Victoria Azarenka (United Kingdom) Emma Raducanu
8 Aug	Canadian Open; Toronto, Canada; WTA 1000 (Non-mandatory); Hard – $2,697,250 – 56S/32Q/28D; Singles – Doubles	(Romania) Simona Halep; 6–3, 2–6, 6–3	(Brazil) Beatriz Haddad Maia	(Czech Republic) Karolína Plíšková (United States) Jessica Pegula	(Switzerland) Belinda Bencic (China) Zheng Qinwen (Kazakhstan) Yulia Putintseva (United States) Coco Gauff
8 Aug	Canadian Open; Toronto, Canada; WTA 1000 (Non-mandatory); Hard – $2,697,250 – 56S/32Q/28D; Singles – Doubles	(United States) Coco Gauff (United States) Jessica Pegula; 6–4, 6–7^{(5–7)}, [10–5]	(United States) Nicole Melichar-Martinez (Australia) Ellen Perez	(Czech Republic) Karolína Plíšková (United States) Jessica Pegula	(Switzerland) Belinda Bencic (China) Zheng Qinwen (Kazakhstan) Yulia Putintseva (United States) Coco Gauff
15 Aug	Cincinnati Open; Mason, United States; WTA 1000 (Non-mandatory); Hard – $2,527,250 – 56S/32Q/28D; Singles – Doubles	(France) Caroline Garcia; 6–2, 6–4	(Czech Republic) Petra Kvitová	(United States) Madison Keys; Aryna Sabalenka	(Kazakhstan) Elena Rybakina (Australia) Ajla Tomljanović (United States) Jessica Pegula (China) Zhang Shuai
15 Aug	Cincinnati Open; Mason, United States; WTA 1000 (Non-mandatory); Hard – $2,527,250 – 56S/32Q/28D; Singles – Doubles	(Ukraine) Lyudmyla Kichenok (Latvia) Jeļena Ostapenko; 7–6^{(7–5)}, 6–3	(United States) Nicole Melichar-Martinez (Australia) Ellen Perez	(United States) Madison Keys; Aryna Sabalenka	(Kazakhstan) Elena Rybakina (Australia) Ajla Tomljanović (United States) Jessica Pegula (China) Zhang Shuai
22 Aug	Tennis in the Land; Cleveland, United States; WTA 250; Hard – $251,750 – 32S/16Q/16D; Singles – Doubles	Liudmila Samsonova; 6–1, 6–3	Aliaksandra Sasnovich	(United States) Bernarda Pera (France) Alizé Cornet	(United States) Sofia Kenin (Poland) Magda Linette (United States) Madison Brengle (China) Zhang Shuai
22 Aug	Tennis in the Land; Cleveland, United States; WTA 250; Hard – $251,750 – 32S/16Q/16D; Singles – Doubles	(United States) Nicole Melichar-Martinez (Australia) Ellen Perez; 7–5, 6–3	(Kazakhstan) Anna Danilina (Serbia) Aleksandra Krunić	(United States) Bernarda Pera (France) Alizé Cornet	(United States) Sofia Kenin (Poland) Magda Linette (United States) Madison Brengle (China) Zhang Shuai
22 Aug	Granby Championships; Granby, Canada; WTA 250; Hard – $251,750 – 32S/16Q/16D; Singles – Doubles	Daria Kasatkina; 6–4, 6–4	(Australia) Daria Saville	(France) Diane Parry (Ukraine) Marta Kostyuk	(Spain) Nuria Párrizas Díaz (Germany) Tatjana Maria (Canada) Rebecca Marino (China) Wang Xiyu
22 Aug	Granby Championships; Granby, Canada; WTA 250; Hard – $251,750 – 32S/16Q/16D; Singles – Doubles	(United Kingdom) Alicia Barnett (United Kingdom) Olivia Nicholls; 5–7, 6–3, [10–1]	(United Kingdom) Harriet Dart (Netherlands) Rosalie van der Hoek	(France) Diane Parry (Ukraine) Marta Kostyuk	(Spain) Nuria Párrizas Díaz (Germany) Tatjana Maria (Canada) Rebecca Marino (China) Wang Xiyu
29 Aug; 5 Sep	US Open; New York City, United States; Grand Slam $60,102,000 – hard 128S/128Q/64D/32X; Singles – Doubles – Mixed	(Poland) Iga Świątek; 6–2, 7–6^{(7–5)}	(Tunisia) Ons Jabeur	Aryna Sabalenka (France) Caroline Garcia	(United States) Jessica Pegula (Czech Republic) Karolína Plíšková (United States) Coco Gauff (Australia) Ajla Tomljanović
29 Aug; 5 Sep	US Open; New York City, United States; Grand Slam $60,102,000 – hard 128S/128Q/64D/32X; Singles – Doubles – Mixed	(Czech Republic) Barbora Krejčíková (Czech Republic) Kateřina Siniaková; 3–6, 7–5, 6–1	(United States) Caty McNally (United States) Taylor Townsend	Aryna Sabalenka (France) Caroline Garcia	(United States) Jessica Pegula (Czech Republic) Karolína Plíšková (United States) Coco Gauff (Australia) Ajla Tomljanović
29 Aug; 5 Sep	US Open; New York City, United States; Grand Slam $60,102,000 – hard 128S/128Q/64D/32X; Singles – Doubles – Mixed	(Australia) Storm Sanders (Australia) John Peers; 4–6, 6–4, [10–7]	(Belgium) Kirsten Flipkens (France) Édouard Roger-Vasselin	Aryna Sabalenka (France) Caroline Garcia	(United States) Jessica Pegula (Czech Republic) Karolína Plíšková (United States) Coco Gauff (Australia) Ajla Tomljanović

=== September ===
Week	Tournament	Champions	Runners-up	Semifinalists	Quarterfinalists
12 Sep	Slovenia Open; Portorož, Slovenia; WTA 250; Hard – $251,750 – 32S/24Q/16D; Singles – Doubles	(Czech Republic) Kateřina Siniaková; 6–7^{(4–7)}, 7–6^{(7–5)}, 6–4	(Kazakhstan) Elena Rybakina	(Germany) Anna-Lena Friedsam (Romania) Ana Bogdan	(France) Diane Parry (Italy) Jasmine Paolini (Ukraine) Lesia Tsurenko (Brazil) Beatriz Haddad Maia
12 Sep	Slovenia Open; Portorož, Slovenia; WTA 250; Hard – $251,750 – 32S/24Q/16D; Singles – Doubles	(Ukraine) Marta Kostyuk (Czech Republic) Tereza Martincová; 6–4, 6–0	(Spain) Cristina Bucșa (Slovakia) Tereza Mihalíková	(Germany) Anna-Lena Friedsam (Romania) Ana Bogdan	(France) Diane Parry (Italy) Jasmine Paolini (Ukraine) Lesia Tsurenko (Brazil) Beatriz Haddad Maia
12 Sep	Chennai Open; Chennai, India; WTA 250; Hard – $251,750 – 32S/24Q/16D; Singles – Doubles	(Czech Republic) Linda Fruhvirtová; 4–6, 6–3, 6–4	(Poland) Magda Linette	(United Kingdom) Katie Swan (Argentina) Nadia Podoroska	(Japan) Nao Hibino (Canada) Rebecca Marino (Canada) Eugenie Bouchard; Varvara Gracheva
12 Sep	Chennai Open; Chennai, India; WTA 250; Hard – $251,750 – 32S/24Q/16D; Singles – Doubles	(Canada) Gabriela Dabrowski (Brazil) Luisa Stefani; 6–1, 6–2	Anna Blinkova (Georgia (country)) Natela Dzalamidze	(United Kingdom) Katie Swan (Argentina) Nadia Podoroska	(Japan) Nao Hibino (Canada) Rebecca Marino (Canada) Eugenie Bouchard; Varvara Gracheva
19 Sep	Pan Pacific Open; Tokyo, Japan; WTA 500; Hard – $757,900 – 28S/24Q/16D; Singles – Doubles	Liudmila Samsonova; 7–5, 7–5	(China) Zheng Qinwen	Veronika Kudermetova (China) Zhang Shuai	(United States) Claire Liu (Brazil) Beatriz Haddad Maia (Spain) Garbiñe Muguruza (Croatia) Petra Martić
19 Sep	Pan Pacific Open; Tokyo, Japan; WTA 500; Hard – $757,900 – 28S/24Q/16D; Singles – Doubles	(Canada) Gabriela Dabrowski (Mexico) Giuliana Olmos; 6–4, 6–4	(United States) Nicole Melichar-Martinez (Australia) Ellen Perez	Veronika Kudermetova (China) Zhang Shuai	(United States) Claire Liu (Brazil) Beatriz Haddad Maia (Spain) Garbiñe Muguruza (Croatia) Petra Martić
19 Sep	Korea Open; Seoul, South Korea; WTA 250; Hard – $251,750 – 32S/24Q/16D; Singles – Doubles	Ekaterina Alexandrova; 7–6^{(7–4)}, 6–0	(Latvia) Jeļena Ostapenko	(United Kingdom) Emma Raducanu (Germany) Tatjana Maria	(Andorra) Victoria Jiménez Kasintseva (Poland) Magda Linette (China) Zhu Lin (Switzerland) Lulu Sun
19 Sep	Korea Open; Seoul, South Korea; WTA 250; Hard – $251,750 – 32S/24Q/16D; Singles – Doubles	(France) Kristina Mladenovic (Belgium) Yanina Wickmayer; 6–3, 6–2	(United States) Asia Muhammad (United States) Sabrina Santamaria	(United Kingdom) Emma Raducanu (Germany) Tatjana Maria	(Andorra) Victoria Jiménez Kasintseva (Poland) Magda Linette (China) Zhu Lin (Switzerland) Lulu Sun
26 Sep	Emilia-Romagna Open; Parma, Italy; WTA 250; Clay – $251,750 – 32S/24Q/16D; Singles – Doubles	(Egypt) Mayar Sherif; 7–5, 6–3	(Greece) Maria Sakkari	(Montenegro) Danka Kovinić (Romania) Ana Bogdan	(Belgium) Maryna Zanevska (Italy) Jasmine Paolini (Romania) Irina-Camelia Begu (United States) Lauren Davis
26 Sep	Emilia-Romagna Open; Parma, Italy; WTA 250; Clay – $251,750 – 32S/24Q/16D; Singles – Doubles	(Czech Republic) Anastasia Dețiuc (Czech Republic) Miriam Kolodziejová; 1–6, 6–3, [10–8]	(Netherlands) Arantxa Rus (Slovenia) Tamara Zidanšek	(Montenegro) Danka Kovinić (Romania) Ana Bogdan	(Belgium) Maryna Zanevska (Italy) Jasmine Paolini (Romania) Irina-Camelia Begu (United States) Lauren Davis
26 Sep	Tallinn Open; Tallinn, Estonia; WTA 250; Hard (i) – $251,750 – 32S/24Q/16D; Singles – Doubles	(Czech Republic) Barbora Krejčíková; 6–2, 6–3	(Estonia) Anett Kontaveit	(Estonia) Kaia Kanepi (Switzerland) Belinda Bencic	(Belgium) Ysaline Bonaventure (Czech Republic) Karolína Muchová (Brazil) Beatriz Haddad Maia (Croatia) Donna Vekić
26 Sep	Tallinn Open; Tallinn, Estonia; WTA 250; Hard (i) – $251,750 – 32S/24Q/16D; Singles – Doubles	(Ukraine) Lyudmyla Kichenok (Ukraine) Nadiia Kichenok; 7–5, 4–6, [10–7]	(United States) Nicole Melichar-Martinez (Germany) Laura Siegemund	(Estonia) Kaia Kanepi (Switzerland) Belinda Bencic	(Belgium) Ysaline Bonaventure (Czech Republic) Karolína Muchová (Brazil) Beatriz Haddad Maia (Croatia) Donna Vekić

=== October ===
Week	Tournament	Champions	Runners-up	Semifinalists	Quarterfinalists
3 Oct	Ostrava Open; Ostrava, Czech Republic; WTA 500; Hard (i) – $757,900 – 28S/24Q/16D; Singles – Doubles	(Czech Republic) Barbora Krejčíková; 5–7, 7–6^{(7–4)}, 6–3	(Poland) Iga Świątek	Ekaterina Alexandrova (Kazakhstan) Elena Rybakina	(United States) Caty McNally (Czech Republic) Tereza Martincová (United States) Alycia Parks (Czech Republic) Petra Kvitová
3 Oct	Ostrava Open; Ostrava, Czech Republic; WTA 500; Hard (i) – $757,900 – 28S/24Q/16D; Singles – Doubles	(United States) Caty McNally (United States) Alycia Parks; 6–3, 6–2	(Poland) Alicja Rosolska (New Zealand) Erin Routliffe	Ekaterina Alexandrova (Kazakhstan) Elena Rybakina	(United States) Caty McNally (Czech Republic) Tereza Martincová (United States) Alycia Parks (Czech Republic) Petra Kvitová
3 Oct	Jasmin Open; Monastir, Tunisia; WTA 250; Hard – $251,750 – 32S/21Q/16D; Singles – Doubles	(Belgium) Elise Mertens; 6–2, 6–0	(France) Alizé Cornet	(United States) Claire Liu; Veronika Kudermetova	(Tunisia) Ons Jabeur (Japan) Moyuka Uchijima (Slovenia) Tamara Zidanšek (France) Diane Parry
3 Oct	Jasmin Open; Monastir, Tunisia; WTA 250; Hard – $251,750 – 32S/21Q/16D; Singles – Doubles	(France) Kristina Mladenovic (Czech Republic) Kateřina Siniaková; 6–2, 6–0	(Japan) Miyu Kato (United States) Angela Kulikov	(United States) Claire Liu; Veronika Kudermetova	(Tunisia) Ons Jabeur (Japan) Moyuka Uchijima (Slovenia) Tamara Zidanšek (France) Diane Parry
10 Oct	San Diego Open; San Diego, United States; WTA 500; Hard – $757,900 – 28S/24Q/16D; Singles – Doubles	(Poland) Iga Świątek; 6–3, 3–6, 6–0	(Croatia) Donna Vekić	(United States) Jessica Pegula (United States) Danielle Collins	(United States) Coco Gauff (United States) Madison Keys; Aryna Sabalenka (Spain) Paula Badosa
10 Oct	San Diego Open; San Diego, United States; WTA 500; Hard – $757,900 – 28S/24Q/16D; Singles – Doubles	(United States) Coco Gauff (United States) Jessica Pegula; 1–6, 7–5, [10–4]	(Canada) Gabriela Dabrowski (Mexico) Giuliana Olmos	(United States) Jessica Pegula (United States) Danielle Collins	(United States) Coco Gauff (United States) Madison Keys; Aryna Sabalenka (Spain) Paula Badosa
10 Oct	Transylvania Open; Cluj-Napoca, Romania; WTA 250; Hard (i) – $251,750 – 32S/24Q/16D; Singles – Doubles	Anna Blinkova; 6–2, 3–6, 6–2	(Italy) Jasmine Paolini	(China) Wang Xiyu; Anastasia Potapova	(Spain) Nuria Párrizas Díaz (Germany) Jule Niemeier (Hungary) Anna Bondár (Ukraine) Anhelina Kalinina
10 Oct	Transylvania Open; Cluj-Napoca, Romania; WTA 250; Hard (i) – $251,750 – 32S/24Q/16D; Singles – Doubles	(Belgium) Kirsten Flipkens (Germany) Laura Siegemund; 6–3, 7–5	Kamilla Rakhimova; Yana Sizikova	(China) Wang Xiyu; Anastasia Potapova	(Spain) Nuria Párrizas Díaz (Germany) Jule Niemeier (Hungary) Anna Bondár (Ukraine) Anhelina Kalinina
17 Oct	Guadalajara Open; Guadalajara, Mexico; WTA 1000 (Non-mandatory); Hard – $2,527,250 – 56S/32Q/28D; Singles – Doubles	(United States) Jessica Pegula; 6–2, 6–3	(Greece) Maria Sakkari	Victoria Azarenka (Czech Republic) Marie Bouzková	(United States) Coco Gauff (United States) Sloane Stephens; Veronika Kudermetova; Anna Kalinskaya
17 Oct	Guadalajara Open; Guadalajara, Mexico; WTA 1000 (Non-mandatory); Hard – $2,527,250 – 56S/32Q/28D; Singles – Doubles	(Australia) Storm Sanders (Brazil) Luisa Stefani; 7–6^{(7–4)}, 6–7^{(2–7)}, [10–8]	(Kazakhstan) Anna Danilina (Brazil) Beatriz Haddad Maia	Victoria Azarenka (Czech Republic) Marie Bouzková	(United States) Coco Gauff (United States) Sloane Stephens; Veronika Kudermetova; Anna Kalinskaya
31 Oct	WTA Finals; Fort Worth, United States; Year-end championships Hard (i) – $5,000,000 – 8S/8D; Singles – Doubles	(France) Caroline Garcia; 7–6^{(7–4)}, 6–4	Aryna Sabalenka	(Poland) Iga Świątek (Greece) Maria Sakkari	Round robin (United States) Coco Gauff (Tunisia) Ons Jabeur; Daria Kasatkina (United States) Jessica Pegula
31 Oct	WTA Finals; Fort Worth, United States; Year-end championships Hard (i) – $5,000,000 – 8S/8D; Singles – Doubles	Veronika Kudermetova (Belgium) Elise Mertens; 6–2, 4–6, [11–9]	(Czech Republic) Barbora Krejčíková (Czech Republic) Kateřina Siniaková	(Poland) Iga Świątek (Greece) Maria Sakkari	Round robin (United States) Coco Gauff (Tunisia) Ons Jabeur; Daria Kasatkina (United States) Jessica Pegula

=== November ===
Week	Tournament	Champions	Runners-up	Semifinalists	Round robin
7 Nov	Billie Jean King Cup Finals; Glasgow, United Kingdom; Hard (i) – 12 teams	Switzerland; 2–0	Australia	Czech Republic; Great Britain	Canada; Italy; Slovakia; Belgium; Spain; Kazakhstan; United States; Poland

=== Affected tournaments ===
The COVID-19 pandemic affected tournaments on both the ATP and WTA tours. The following tournaments were cancelled due to the pandemic or other reasons.

Week of	Tournament	Status
January 3	Brisbane International; Brisbane, Australia; WTA 500; Hard	Cancelled
January 3	Auckland Open; Auckland, New Zealand; WTA 250; Hard	Cancelled
January 3	Shenzhen Open; Shenzhen, China; WTA 250; Hard	Cancelled
January 10	Hobart International; Hobart, Australia; WTA 250; Hard	Cancelled
January 31	Thailand Open; Hua Hin, Thailand; WTA 250; Hard	Cancelled
May 16	Cologne Open; Cologne, Germany; WTA 250; Clay	Cancelled due to organizational issues
September 12	Japan Women's Open; Osaka, Japan; WTA 250; Hard	Cancelled due to financial crisis
October 17	Kremlin Cup; Moscow, Russia; WTA 500; Hard (i)	Suspended indefinitely due to the Russian invasion of Ukraine
October 24	Linz Open; Linz, Austria; WTA 250; Hard (i)	Postponed to February 2023

== Statistical information ==
These tables present the number of singles (S), doubles (D), and mixed doubles (X) titles won by each player and each nation during the season, within all the tournament categories of the 2022 WTA Tour: the Grand Slam tournaments, the year-end championships (the WTA Finals), the WTA Premier tournaments (WTA 1000 and WTA 500), and the WTA 250. The players/nations are sorted by:

1. total number of titles (a doubles title won by two players representing the same nation counts as only one win for the nation);
2. cumulated importance of those titles (one Grand Slam win equalling two WTA 1000 wins, one year-end championships win equalling one-and-a-half WTA 1000 win, one WTA 1000 win equalling two WTA 500 wins, one WTA 500 win equalling two WTA 250 wins);
3. a singles > doubles > mixed doubles hierarchy;
4. alphabetical order (by family names for players).

=== Key ===
Grand Slam tournaments
Year-end championships
WTA 1000 (Mandatory)
WTA 1000 (Non-mandatory)
WTA 500
WTA 250

=== Titles won by player ===
Total	Player	Grand Slam			Year-end		WTA 1000 (M)		WTA 1000 (NM)		WTA 500		WTA 250		Total		
Total	Player	S	D	X	S	D	S	D	S	D	S	D	S	D	S	D	X
8	Iga Świątek (POL)	● ●					● ●		● ●		●●				8	0	0
7	Kateřina Siniaková (CZE)		● ● ●									●	●	● ●	1	6	0
6	Jessica Pegula (USA)								●	● ●		●		● ●	1	5	0
5	Barbora Krejčíková (CZE)		● ● ●								●		●		2	3	0
5	Caroline Garcia (FRA)		●		●				●				● ●		4	1	0
5	Kristina Mladenovic (FRA)		●	●										● ● ●	0	4	1
4	Storm Sanders (AUS)			●						●		● ●			0	3	1
4	Beatriz Haddad Maia (BRA)											●	● ●	●	2	2	0
3	Ashleigh Barty (AUS)	●									●	●			2	1	0
3	Veronika Kudermetova (Note: As of 1 March 2022, the WTA announced that players from Russia and Belarus will not compete in tournaments under the name or flag of Russia or Belarus due to the Russian invasion of Ukraine.)					●				●		●			0	3	0
3	Elise Mertens (BEL)					●						●	●		1	2	0
3	Gabriela Dabrowski (CAN)							●				●		●	0	3	0
3	Laura Siegemund (GER)							●						● ●	0	3	0
3	Coco Gauff (USA)									● ●		●			0	3	0
3	Jeļena Ostapenko (LAT)									●	●			●	1	2	0
3	Lyudmyla Kichenok (UKR)									●				● ●	0	3	0
3	Liudmila Samsonova										●		● ●		3	0	0
3	Bernarda Pera (USA)												● ●	●	2	1	0
3	Eri Hozumi (JPN)													● ● ●	0	3	0
3	Makoto Ninomiya (JPN)													● ● ●	0	3	0
2	Desirae Krawczyk (USA)			●								●			0	1	1
2	Ons Jabeur (TUN)						●				●				2	0	0
2	Giuliana Olmos (MEX)							●				●			0	2	0
2	Xu Yifan (CHN)							●				●			0	2	0
2	Yang Zhaoxuan (CHN)							●				●			0	2	0
2	Vera Zvonareva							●						●	0	2	0
2	Simona Halep (ROU)								●				●		2	0	0
2	Luisa Stefani (BRA)									●				●	0	2	0
2	Magda Linette (POL)											● ●			0	2	0
2	Caty McNally (USA)											● ●			0	2	0
2	Daria Kasatkina										●		●		2	0	0
2	Anna Danilina (KAZ)											●		●	0	2	0
2	Ekaterina Alexandrova												● ●		2	0	0
2	Marie Bouzková (CZE)												●	●	1	1	0
2	Anastasia Potapova												●	●	1	1	0
2	Zhang Shuai (CHN)												●	●	1	1	0
2	Nicole Melichar-Martinez (USA)													● ●	0	2	0
2	Ellen Perez (AUS)													● ●	0	2	0
1	Elena Rybakina (KAZ)	●													1	0	0
1	Ena Shibahara (JPN)			●											0	0	1
1	Anastasia Pavlyuchenkova									●					0	1	0
1	Paula Badosa (ESP)										●				1	0	0
1	Belinda Bencic (SUI)										●				1	0	0
1	Anett Kontaveit (EST)										●				1	0	0
1	Petra Kvitová (CZE)										●				1	0	0
1	Anna Kalinskaya											●			0	1	0
1	Andreja Klepač (SLO)											●			0	1	0
1	Aleksandra Krunić (SRB)											●			0	1	0
1	Alycia Parks (USA)											●			0	1	0
1	Demi Schuurs (NED)											●			0	1	0
1	Amanda Anisimova (USA)												●		1	0	0
1	Irina-Camelia Begu (ROU)												●		1	0	0
1	Anna Blinkova												●		1	0	0
1	Leylah Fernandez (CAN)												●		1	0	0
1	Linda Fruhvirtová (CZE)												●		1	0	0
1	Angelique Kerber (GER)												●		1	0	0
1	Madison Keys (USA)												●		1	0	0
1	Tatjana Maria (GER)												●		1	0	0
1	Petra Martić (CRO)												●		1	0	0
1	Mayar Sherif (EGY)												●		1	0	0
1	Sloane Stephens (USA)												●		1	0	0
1	Martina Trevisan (ITA)												●		1	0	0
1	Alicia Barnett (GBR)													●	0	1	0
1	Anna Bondár (HUN)													●	0	1	0
1	Sophie Chang (USA)													●	0	1	0
1	Kaitlyn Christian (USA)													●	0	1	0
1	Olga Danilović (SRB)													●	0	1	0
1	Anastasia Dețiuc (CZE)													●	0	1	0
1	Kirsten Flipkens (BEL)													●	0	1	0
1	Anna-Lena Friedsam (GER)													●	0	1	0
1	Ekaterine Gorgodze (GEO)													●	0	1	0
1	Catherine Harrison (USA)													●	0	1	0
1	Oksana Kalashnikova (GEO)													●	0	1	0
1	Nadiia Kichenok (UKR)													●	0	1	0
1	Miriam Kolodziejová (CZE)													●	0	1	0
1	Marta Kostyuk (UKR)													●	0	1	0
1	Angela Kulikov (USA)													●	0	1	0
1	Lidziya Marozava (BLR)													●	0	1	0
1	Tereza Martincová (CZE)													●	0	1	0
1	Asia Muhammad (USA)													●	0	1	0
1	Olivia Nicholls (GBR)													●	0	1	0
1	Erin Routliffe (NZL)													●	0	1	0
1	Sabrina Santamaria (USA)													●	0	1	0
1	Daria Saville (AUS)													●	0	1	0
1	Astra Sharma (AUS)													●	0	1	0
1	Yana Sizikova													●	0	1	0
1	Sara Sorribes Tormo (ESP)													●	0	1	0
1	Aldila Sutjiadi (INA)													●	0	1	0
1	Yanina Wickmayer (BEL)													●	0	1	0
1	Tamara Zidanšek (SLO)													●	0	1	0
1	Kimberley Zimmermann (BEL)													●	0	1	0

=== Titles won by nation ===
Total	Nation	Grand Slam			Year-end		WTA 1000 (M)		WTA 1000 (NM)		WTA 500		WTA 250		Total		
Total	Nation	S	D	X	S	D	S	D	S	D	S	D	S	D	S	D	X
21	United States (USA)			1					1	2		4	5	8	6	14	1
15	Czech Republic (CZE)		3								2	1	4	5	6	9	0
10	Poland (POL)	2					2		2		2	2			8	2	0
10	Australia (AUS)	1		1						1	1	2		4	2	7	1
9	France (FRA)		1	1	1				1				2	3	4	4	1
6	Belgium (BEL)					1						1	1	3	1	5	0
6	Germany (GER)							1					2	3	2	4	0
6	Brazil (BRA)									1		1	2	2	2	4	0
4	Japan (JPN)			1										3	0	3	1
4	Canada (CAN)							1				1	1	1	1	3	0
4	China (CHN)							1				1	1	1	1	3	0
4	Ukraine (UKR)									1				3	0	4	0
3	Kazakhstan (KAZ)	1										1		1	1	2	0
3	Romania (ROU)								1				2		3	0	0
3	Latvia (LAT)									1	1			1	1	2	0
2	Tunisia (TUN)						1				1				2	0	0
2	Mexico (MEX)							1				1			0	2	0
2	Spain (ESP)										1			1	1	1	0
2	Russia (RUS) (Note: From 1 March, titles won by Russian players will not be counted towards Russia's tally.)											2			0	2	0
2	Serbia (SRB)											1		1	0	2	0
2	Slovenia (SLO)											1		1	0	2	0
1	Estonia (EST)										1				1	0	0
1	Switzerland (SUI)										1				1	0	0
1	Netherlands (NED)											1			0	1	0
1	Croatia (CRO)												1		1	0	0
1	Egypt (EGY)												1		1	0	0
1	Italy (ITA)												1		1	0	0
1	Belarus (BLR) (Note: From 1 March, titles won by Belarusian players will not be counted towards Belarus' tally.)													1	0	1	0
1	Georgia (GEO)													1	0	1	0
1	Great Britain (GBR)													1	0	1	0
1	Hungary (HUN)													1	0	1	0
1	Indonesia (INA)													1	0	1	0
1	New Zealand (NZL)													1	0	1	0

- Notes

=== Titles information ===
The following players won their first main circuit title in singles, doubles, or mixed doubles:

Singles

- Anastasia Potapova (21 years, 25 days) – Istanbul (draw)
- (Italy) Martina Trevisan (28 years, 199 days) – Rabat (draw)
- (Brazil) Beatriz Haddad Maia (26 years, 13 days) – Nottingham (draw)
- (United States) Bernarda Pera (27 years, 226 days) – Budapest (draw)
- (Czech Republic) Marie Bouzková (24 years, 10 days) – Prague (draw)
- (Czech Republic) Linda Fruhvirtová (17 years, 140 days) – Chennai (draw)
- (Egypt) Mayar Sherif (26 years, 149 days) – Parma (draw)
- Anna Blinkova (24 years, 36 days) – Cluj-Napoca (draw)

Doubles

- (United States) Bernarda Pera – Melbourne 2 (draw)
- (United States) Jessica Pegula – Melbourne 1 (draw)
- (United States) Kaitlyn Christian – Guadalajara (draw)
- (United States) Catherine Harrison – Monterrey (draw)
- (United States) Sabrina Santamaria – Monterrey (draw)
- (Indonesia) Aldila Sutjiadi – Bogotá (draw)
- (Poland) Magda Linette – Charleston (draw)
- (United States) Sophie Chang – Hamburg (draw)
- (United States) Angela Kulikov – Hamburg (draw)
- (Hungary) Anna Bondár – Palermo (draw)
- (United Kingdom) Alicia Barnett – Granby (draw)
- (United Kingdom) Olivia Nicholls – Granby (draw)
- (Ukraine) Marta Kostyuk – Portorož (draw)
- (Czech Republic) Tereza Martincová – Portorož (draw)
- (Czech Republic) Anastasia Dețiuc – Parma (draw)
- (Czech Republic) Miriam Kolodziejová – Parma (draw)
- (United States) Alycia Parks – Ostrava (draw)

Mixed

- (Japan) Ena Shibahara – **Roland Garros** (draw)
- (Australia) Storm Sanders – **US Open** (draw)

The following players defended a main circuit title in singles, doubles, or mixed doubles:

Singles

- (Canada) Leylah Fernandez – Monterrey (draw)
- (Poland) Iga Świątek – Rome (draw)

Doubles

- (Belgium) Kimberley Zimmermann – Palermo (draw)
- (Kazakhstan) Anna Danilina – Warsaw (draw)

Mixed

- (United States) Desirae Krawczyk – **Wimbledon (draw)**

=== Best ranking ===
The following players achieved their career high ranking in this season inside top 50 (players who made their top 10 debut indicated in bold): (Note: Name and ranking in bold means the player entered the top 10 or became world No. 1 for the first time, and only the ranking in bold means the player had entered the top 10 previously but reached a new career high ranking.)

Singles

- (United States) Ann Li (reached place No. 44 on January 10)
- (Kazakhstan) Elena Rybakina (reached place No. 12 on January 17)
- (Spain) Sara Sorribes Tormo (reached place No. 32 on February 7)
- (Denmark) Clara Tauson (reached place No. 33 on February 7)
- (Czech Republic) Tereza Martincová (reached place No. 40 on February 14)
- (Ukraine) Marta Kostyuk (reached place No. 49 on February 14)
- (Italy) Jasmine Paolini (reached place No. 44 on February 21)
- (Czech Republic) Barbora Krejčíková (reached place **No. 2** on February 28)
- (Slovenia) Tamara Zidanšek (reached place No. 22 on February 28)
- (Switzerland) Viktorija Golubic (reached place No. 35 on February 28)
- (Spain) Nuria Párrizas Díaz (reached place No. 45 on March 7)
- (Greece) Maria Sakkari (reached place **No. 3** on March 21)
- (Poland) Iga Świątek (reached place **No. 1** on April 4)
- (Colombia) Camila Osorio (reached place No. 33 on April 4)
- (Spain) Paula Badosa (reached place **No. 2** on April 25)
- (Estonia) Anett Kontaveit (reached place **No. 2** on June 6)
- (Tunisia) Ons Jabeur (reached place **No. 2** on June 27)
- (Ukraine) Anhelina Kalinina (reached place No. 34 on June 27)
- (United States) **Danielle Collins** (reached place **No. 7** on July 11)
- (United Kingdom) **Emma Raducanu** (reached place **No. 10** on July 11)
- (Switzerland) Jil Teichmann (reached place No. 21 on July 11)
- (Italy) Martina Trevisan (reached place No. 24 on July 18)
- (Egypt) Mayar Sherif (reached place No. 44 on July 18)
- (Hungary) Anna Bondár (reached place No. 50 on July 18)
- (Canada) Leylah Fernandez (reached place No. 13 on August 8)
- (United States) Shelby Rogers (reached place No. 30 on August 8)
- (Brazil) Beatriz Haddad Maia (reached place No. 15 on August 22)
- (Belarus) Aliaksandra Sasnovich (reached place No. 29 on September 19)
- (Romania) Ana Bogdan (reached place No. 46 on October 3)
- (Russia) Ekaterina Alexandrova (reached place No. 19 on October 17)
- (United States) Bernarda Pera (reached place No. 42 on October 17)
- (United States) **Jessica Pegula** (reached place **No. 3** on October 24)
- (United States) **Coco Gauff** (reached place **No. 4** on October 24)
- (Russia) Daria Kasatkina (reached place **No. 8** on October 24)
- (Russia) **Veronika Kudermetova** (reached place **No. 9** on October 24)
- (Russia) Liudmila Samsonova (reached place No. 19 on October 24)
- (China) Zheng Qinwen (reached place No. 25 on October 24)
- (Czech Republic) Marie Bouzková (reached place No. 26 on October 31)
- (Australia) Ajla Tomljanović (reached place No. 33 on October 31)
- (Russia) Anastasia Potapova (reached place No. 43 on October 31)

Doubles

- (Serbia) Nina Stojanović (reached place No. 37 on January 17)
- (Ukraine) Nadiia Kichenok (reached place No. 29 on January 31)
- (Romania) Raluca Olaru (reached place No. 30 on January 31)
- (Poland) Iga Świątek (reached place No. 29 on February 14)
- (United States) Bernarda Pera (reached place No. 35 on February 21)
- (Croatia) Petra Martić (reached place No. 49 on February 21)
- (United States) Shelby Rogers (reached place No. 40 on February 28)
- (Japan) Ena Shibahara (reached place **No. 4** on March 21)
- (United States) Caty McNally (reached place No. 11 on April 4)
- (Slovenia) Andreja Klepač (reached place No. 11 on April 11)
- (Poland) Magda Linette (reached place No. 26 on April 11)
- (Czech Republic) Marie Bouzková (reached place No. 24 on May 9)
- (United States) Caroline Dolehide (reached place No. 21 on May 16)
- (Georgia (country)) Natela Dzalamidze (reached place No. 43 on May 16)
- (Russia) **Veronika Kudermetova** (reached place **No. 2** on June 6)
- (China) Zhang Shuai (reached place **No. 2** on July 11)
- (Canada) Gabriela Dabrowski (reached place **No. 4** on July 11)
- (United States) **Desirae Krawczyk** (reached place **No. 10** on July 11)
- (New Zealand) Erin Routliffe (reached place No. 29 on August 8)
- (United States) **Coco Gauff** (reached place **No. 1** on August 15)
- (Georgia (country)) Ekaterine Gorgodze (reached place No. 43 on August 15)
- (Belgium) Greet Minnen (reached place No. 47 on August 15)
- (Latvia) **Jeļena Ostapenko** (reached place **No. 7** on September 12)
- (Ukraine) **Lyudmyla Kichenok** (reached place **No. 9** on September 12)
- (Norway) Ulrikke Eikeri (reached place No. 40 on September 12)
- (Ukraine) Marta Kostyuk (reached place No. 39 on September 19)
- (Mexico) **Giuliana Olmos** (reached place **No. 7** on September 26)
- (United States) Taylor Townsend (reached place No. 32 on September 26)
- (United States) Asia Muhammad (reached place No. 28 on October 3)
- (Australia) Ellen Perez (reached place No. 15 on October 17)
- (Germany) Laura Siegemund (reached place No. 27 on October 17)
- (United States) **Jessica Pegula** (reached place **No. 3** on October 24)
- (Australia) **Storm Sanders** (reached place **No. 8** on October 24)
- (China) Zhaoxuan Yang (reached place No. 11 on October 24)
- (Kazakhstan) Anna Danilina (reached place No. 12 on October 24)
- (Brazil) Beatriz Haddad Maia (reached place No. 13 on October 24)
- (Spain) Sara Sorribes Tormo (reached place No. 39 on October 24)
- (Russia) Anastasia Potapova (reached place No. 41 on October 24)
- (Hungary) Anna Bondár (reached place No. 47 on October 24)
- (Belgium) Kimberley Zimmermann (reached place No. 44 on October 31)
- (Slovakia) Tereza Mihalíková (reached place No. 49 on October 31)

== Points distribution ==
Points are awarded as follows: (Note: Wimbledon was stripped of its ranking points as a result of the All England Club's decision to ban Russian and Belarusian players from competing.)

Category	W	F	SF	QF	R16	R32	R64	R128	Q	Q3	Q2	Q1
Grand Slam (S, except Wimbledon)	2000	1300	780	430	240	130	70	10	40	30	20	2
Grand Slam (D, except Wimbledon)	2000	1300	780	430	240	130	10	–	40	–	–	–
WTA Finals (S)	1500*	1080*	750*	(+125 per round robin match; +125 per round robin win)								
WTA Finals (D)	1500*	1080*	750*	(+125 per round robin match; +125 per round robin win)								
WTA 1000 (96S)	1000	650	390	215	120	65	35	10	30	–	20	2
WTA 1000 (64/60S)	1000	650	390	215	120	65	10	–	30	–	20	2
WTA 1000 (32/30D)	1000	650	390	215	120	10	–	–	–	–	–	–
WTA 1000 (56S, 48Q/32Q)	900	585	350	190	105	60	1	–	30	–	20	1
WTA 1000 (28D)	900	585	350	190	105	1	–	–	–	–	–	–
WTA 500 (56S)	470	305	185	100	55	30	1	–	25	–	13	1
WTA 500 (32/30/28S)	470	305	185	100	55	1	–	–	25	18	13	1
WTA 500 (16D)	470	305	185	100	1	–	–	–	–	–	–	–
WTA 250 (32S, 24/16Q)	280	180	110	60	30	1	–	–	18	–	12	1
WTA 250 (16D)	280	180	110	60	1	–	–	–	–	–	–	–

S = singles players, D = doubles teams, Q = qualification players.
* Assumes undefeated round robin match record.

== WTA rankings ==
Below are the tables for the WTA rankings (Note: The WTA rankings are the weekly computer ratings defined by the WTA and are based on a rolling, 52-week cumulative system.) and the yearly WTA Race rankings (Note: The WTA Race rankings measure the points a player (for singles) or team (for doubles) has accumulated over the season leading up to the year-end WTA Finals.) of the top 20 singles players, doubles players, and doubles teams.

=== Singles ===
Final Singles Race rankings
No.	Player	Points	Tourn	Move^{†}
1	Iga Świątek (POL) ✓	10,335	16	Steady
2	Ons Jabeur (TUN) ✓	4,555	17	Steady
3	Jessica Pegula (USA) ✓	4,316	17	Steady
4	Coco Gauff (USA) ✓	3,271	18	Steady
5	Maria Sakkari (GRE) ✓	3,121	21	▲5
6	**Caroline Garcia** (FRA) ✓	3,000	21	Steady
7	Aryna Sabalenka (BLR) ✓	2,970	20	▼2
8	Daria Kasatkina (RUS) ✓	2,935	22	▼1
9	Veronika Kudermetova (RUS)	2,795	20	Steady
10	Simona Halep (ROU)	2,661	15	▼2
11	Madison Keys (USA)	2,417	20	▲2
12	Belinda Bencic (SUI)	2,365	19	Steady
13	Paula Badosa (ESP)	2,363	21	▼2
14	Danielle Collins (USA)	2,287	13	Steady
15	Petra Kvitová (CZE)	2,097	19	▲2
16	Anett Kontaveit (EST)	2,093	16	▼1
17	Beatriz Haddad Maia (BRA)	2,050	22	▼1
18	Jeļena Ostapenko (LAT)	1,986	19	▲1
19	Ekaterina Alexandrova (RUS)	1,910	20	▼1
20	Liudmila Samsonova (RUS)	1,910	20	▲1

**Champion** in bold
Runner-up in italics

✓ Qualified for the WTA Finals.

WTA Singles Year-End Rankings
#	Player	Points	#Trn	'21 Rk	High	Low	'21→'22
1	Iga Świątek (POL)	11,085	17	9	1	9	▲8
2	Ons Jabeur (TUN)	5,055	18	10	2	11	▲8
3	Jessica Pegula (USA)	4,691	18	18	3	22	▲15
4	Caroline Garcia (FRA)	4,375	23	74	4	79	▲70
5	Aryna Sabalenka (BLR)	3,925	21	2	2	8	▼3
6	Maria Sakkari (GRE)	3,871	22	6	3	8	Steady
7	Coco Gauff (USA)	3,646	19	22	4	23	▲15
8	Daria Kasatkina (RUS)	3,435	23	26	8	29	▲18
9	Veronika Kudermetova (RUS)	2,795	20	31	9	32	▲22
10	Simona Halep (ROU)	2,661	15	20	6	27	▲10
11	Madison Keys (USA)	2,417	20	56	11	87	▲45
12	Belinda Bencic (SUI)	2,365	19	23	11	28	▲11
13	Paula Badosa (ESP)	2,363	21	8	2	13	▼5
14	Danielle Collins (USA)	2,292	14	29	7	30	▲15
15	Beatriz Haddad Maia (BRA)	2,215	27	82	15	88	▲67
16	Petra Kvitová (CZE)	2,097	19	17	16	34	▲1
17	Anett Kontaveit (EST)	2,093	16	7	2	17	▼10
18	Jeļena Ostapenko (LAT)	1,986	19	28	11	28	▲10
19	Ekaterina Alexandrova (RUS)	1,910	20	33	19	54	▲14
20	Liudmila Samsonova (RUS)	1,910	20	39	19	60	▲19

==== Number 1 ranking ====
Holder	Date gained	Date forfeited
Ashleigh Barty (AUS)	**Year end 2021**	3 April 2022
**Iga Świątek (POL)**	4 April 2022	**Year end 2022**

=== Doubles ===
Final Doubles Race rankings
No.	Player	Points	Tourn	Move^{†}
1	Barbora Krejčíková (CZE) ✓ Kateřina Siniaková (CZE)	4,651	7	▲1
2	Gabriela Dabrowski (CAN) ✓ Giuliana Olmos (MEX)	4,335	20	▼1
3	Coco Gauff (USA) ✓ Jessica Pegula (USA)	4,086	9	Steady
4	**Veronika Kudermetova** (RUS) ✓ **Elise Mertens** (BEL)	3,770	12	▲1
5	Lyudmyla Kichenok (UKR) ✓ Jeļena Ostapenko (LAT)	3,745	16	▼1
6	Xu Yifan (CHN) ✓ Yang Zhaoxuan (CHN)	3,580	19	Steady
7	Anna Danilina (KAZ) ✓ Beatriz Haddad Maia (BRA)	3,235	12	▲2
8	Desirae Krawczyk (USA) ✓ Demi Schuurs (NED)	3,180	15	▼1
9	Nicole Melichar-Martinez (USA); Ellen Perez (AUS)	3,160	13	▼1
10	Caroline Garcia (FRA); Kristina Mladenovic (FRA)	2,560	3	Steady

**Champions** in bold
Runners-up in italics

✓ Qualified for the WTA Finals.

WTA Doubles Year-End Rankings
#	Player	Points	#Trn	'21 Rk	High	Low	'21→'22
1	Kateřina Siniaková (CZE)	6,890	12	1	1	4	Steady
2	Veronika Kudermetova (RUS)	6,035	15	14	2	14	▲12
3	Barbora Krejčíková (CZE)	5,937	10	2	2	8	▼1
4	Coco Gauff (USA)	5,360	15	21	1	26	▲17
5	Elise Mertens (BEL)	5,310	16	4	1	9	▼1
6	Jessica Pegula (USA)	5,160	16	50	3	51	▲44
7	Gabriela Dabrowski (CAN)	4,740	21	7	4	11	Steady
8	Giuliana Olmos (MEX)	4,650	23	18	7	22	▲10
9	Lyudmyla Kichenok (UKR)	4,300	22	38	9	40	▲29
10	Storm Sanders (AUS)	4,265	15	30	8	30	▲20
11	Anna Danilina (KAZ)	4,220	33	83	11	75	▲72
12	Yang Zhaoxuan (CHN)	4,180	21	48	11	75	▲36
13	Beatriz Haddad Maia (BRA)	4,150	20	481	13	485	▲468
14	Jeļena Ostapenko (LAT)	4,020	17	23	7	30	▲9
15	Xu Yifan (CHN)	3,975	21	37	15	58	▲22
16	Desirae Krawczyk (USA)	3,805	24	17	10	21	▲1
17	Demi Schuurs (NED)	3,685	19	11	10	21	▼6
18	Kristina Mladenovic (FRA)	3,650	11	24	12	232	▲6
19	Nicole Melichar-Martinez (USA)	3,645	19	12	9	37	▼7
20	Ellen Perez (AUS)	3,460	20	42	15	50	▲22

==== Number 1 ranking ====
Holder	Date gained	Date forfeited
Kateřina Siniaková (CZE)	**Year end 2021**	5 June 2022
Elise Mertens (BEL)	6 June 2022	14 August 2022
Coco Gauff (USA)	15 August 2022	11 September 2022
**Kateřina Siniaková (CZE)**	12 September 2022	**Year end 2022**

== Prize money leaders ==
Prize money in US$ as of 14 November 2022
#	Player	Singles	Doubles	Mixed doubles	Year-to-date
1.	Iga Świątek (POL)	$9,875,525	$0	$0	$9,875,525
2.	Ons Jabeur (TUN)	$4,976,594	$20,475	$0	$4,977,069
3.	Caroline Garcia (FRA)	$3,353,354	$375,963	$0	$3,729,317
4.	Elena Rybakina (KAZ)	$3,570,968	$42,472	$0	$3,613,440
5.	Jessica Pegula (USA)	$3,165,252	$434,293	$12,171	$3,611,716
6.	Coco Gauff (USA)	$2,541,338	$490,618	$19,997	$3,051,953
7.	Maria Sakkari (GRE)	$2,464,204	$17,215	$0	$2,481,419
8.	Aryna Sabalenka (BLR)	$2,431,495	$29,825	$0	$2,461,320
9.	Ashleigh Barty (AUS)	$2,271,220	$18,100	$0	$2,289,320
10.	Simona Halep (ROU)	$2,240,117	$13,080	$0	$2,253,197

== Retirements ==
The following is a list of notable players (winners of a main tour title, and/or part of the WTA rankings top 100 in singles, or top 100 in doubles, for at least one week) who announced their retirement from professional tennis, became inactive (after not playing for more than 52 weeks), or were permanently banned from playing, during the 2022 season:

- Kristie Ahn (born 15 June 1992 in Flushing, New York City, United States) turned professional in May 2008, and reached a career-high singles ranking of No. 87 in the world on 30 September 2019; she also reached No. 199 in doubles on 24 April 2017. She won seven singles titles on the ITF Tour, including an 80K title at the 2017 Tyler Challenge; she also won two doubles titles on the ITF Circuit. Her best result at a Grand Slam tournament was a fourth round finish at the 2019 US Open, defeating former top ten players Svetlana Kuznetsova and Jeļena Ostapenko before losing to Elise Mertens. Ahn announced her retirement on 5 March 2022 on Instagram.
- Lara Arruabarrena (born 20 March 1992 in Tolosa, Spain) turned professional in 2007, and reached a career-high singles ranking of No. 52 in the world on 3 July 2017; she also reached No. 28 in doubles on 28 February 2016. She won two singles and eight titles on the WTA Tour. Arruabarrena announced her retirement from tennis in August 2022.

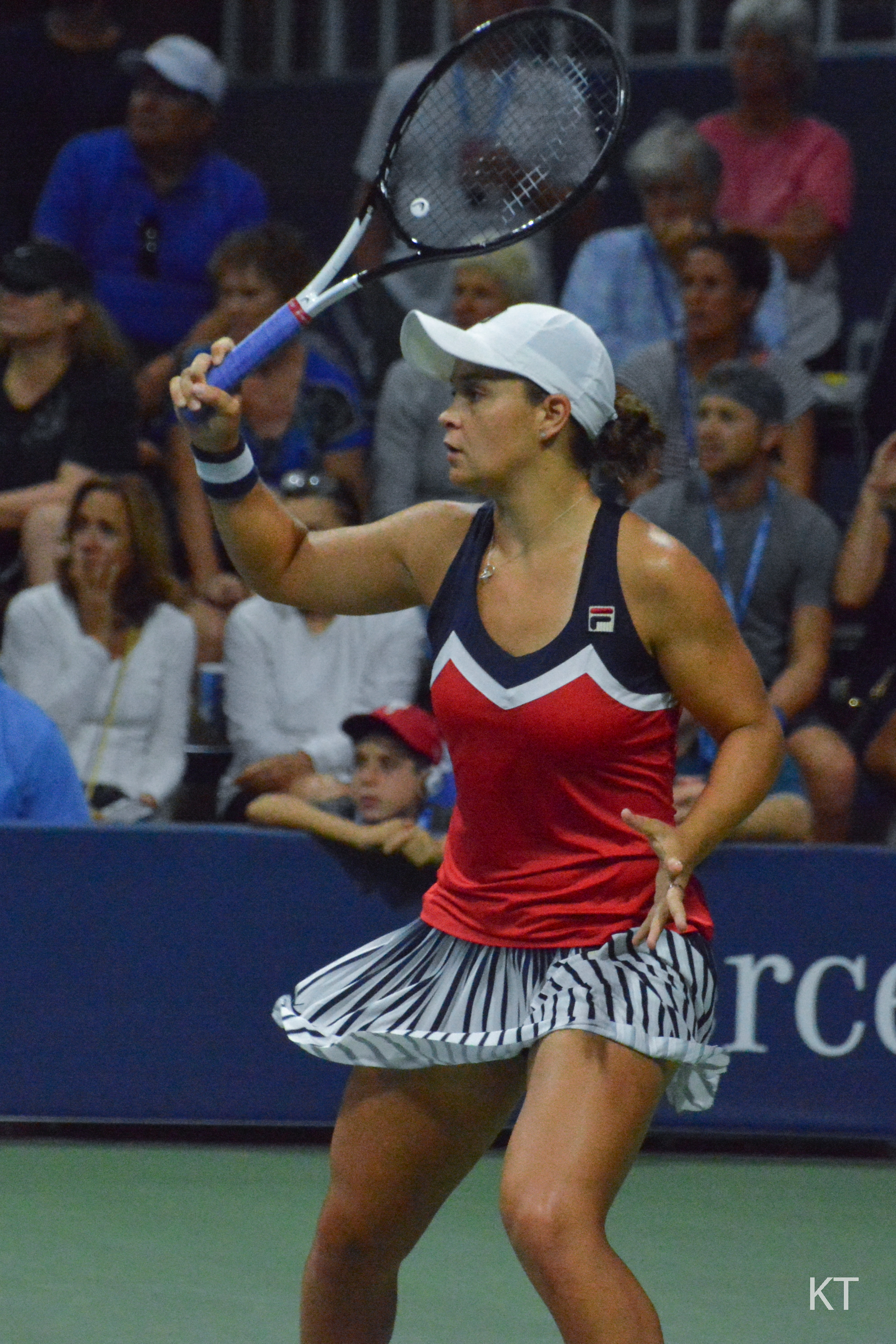
Ashleigh Barty (pictured in 2018) retired as the world No. 1 and reigning champion at the Australian Open.

- Ashleigh Barty (born 24 April 1996 in Ipswich, Australia) turned professional in 2010. A junior world No. 2, Barty won the girls' singles title at the 2011 Wimbledon Championships, and competed on the WTA Tour from 2012 to 2014, focusing mainly on doubles. Partnering Casey Dellacqua, Barty finished as a runner-up at three Grand Slam tournaments – the 2013 Australian Open, 2013 Wimbledon Championships, and 2013 US Open – won two WTA doubles titles, and reached a peak doubles ranking of No. 12 in the world on 21 October 2013; her highest singles ranking was No. 129 in the world, achieved on 30 September 2013 after winning four singles titles on the ITF circuit. At the end of the 2014 season, Barty announced that she would "take a break" from tennis, citing exhaustion, and focused on cricket for two years, playing for the Brisbane Heat in the WBBL. She announced her return to tennis in February 2016, and began to make her breakthrough in 2017. She won her maiden WTA singles title at the 2017 Malaysian Open, and won multiple doubles titles at WTA 1000 level and above in 2018, including her maiden Grand Slam title at the 2018 US Open, partnering CoCo Vandeweghe. Barty began to make great strides in her singles game from the start of 2019, winning the singles title at the 2019 Miami Open, a WTA 1000 event, before winning her maiden Grand Slam title at the 2019 French Open. Barty would rise to the world No. 1 ranking for the first time on 24 June 2019, and would hold it continuously from 9 September 2019 until the date of her retirement. In total, Barty would win 15 WTA Tour singles titles – including two further Grand Slam titles at the 2021 Wimbledon Championships and the 2022 Australian Open, becoming the first Australian woman to win the home Slam since Chris O'Neil in 1978, and the 2019 WTA Finals – and would win a total 12 WTA Tour doubles titles, reaching a career-high doubles ranking of No. 5 in the world on 21 May 2018; Barty would also win an Olympic bronze medal at the 2020 Summer Olympics in the mixed doubles competition, partnering John Peers, and led Australia to a runner-up finish at the 2019 Fed Cup. Barty would hold the WTA world No. 1 ranking for a total of 120 weeks, the seventh longest stint in history; 113 of these weeks were consecutive, which is the fifth longest consecutive run at No. 1 in history, tied with Chris Evert. Barty announced her retirement on 23 March 2022, citing a lack of desire to compete, in an interview with friend and former doubles partner Dellacqua, becoming the second player to retire as the world No. 1, after Justine Henin in 2008.
- Catherine "CiCi" Bellis (born 8 April 1999 in San Francisco, United States) turned professional in September 2016 and reached a career-high ranking of No. 35 in the world on 14 August 2017. She won one WTA 125K singles title at the 2016 Hawaii Open, and also won seven ITF singles titles; she won two doubles titles on the ITF circuit, reaching a career-high doubles ranking of No. 149 on 17 July 2017. At Grand Slams, she reached the third round of the 2016 US Open, 2017 French Open, and the 2020 Australian Open, and reached the quarterfinals of the 2017 Wimbledon Championships in doubles. After an injury-marred career, Bellis announced her retirement on 20 January 2022.

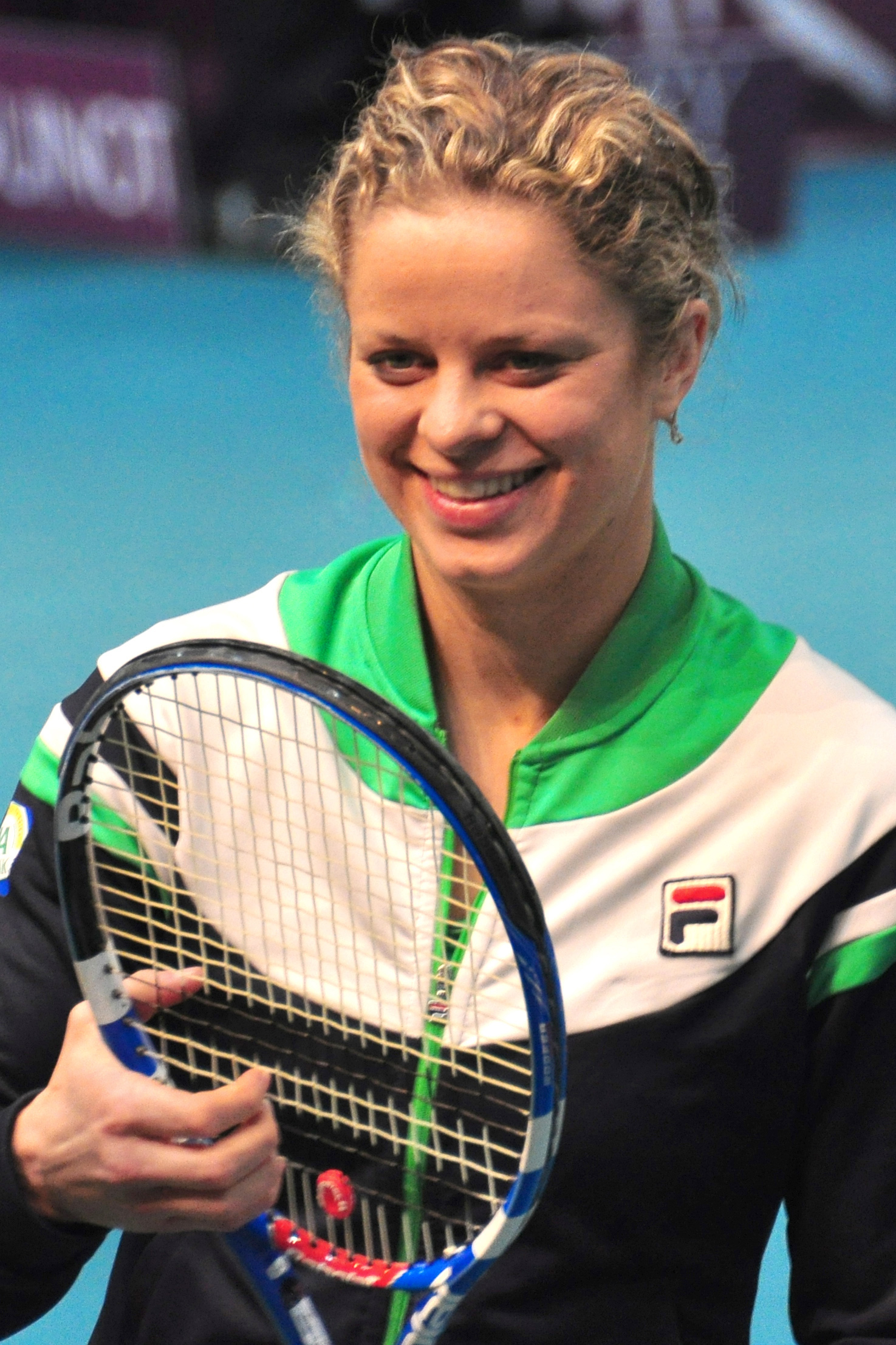
Former world No. 1 and Grand Slam champion Kim Clijsters (pictured in 2011) retired for the third time in 2022.

- Kim Clijsters (born 8 June 1983 in Bilzen, Belgium) turned professional in August 1997. A former world No. 1 in both singles and doubles, she first attained the ranking in singles on 11 August 2003, and in doubles on 4 August 2003. In total, Clijsters held the ranking in singles for 20 weeks, and was No. 1 in doubles for four weeks, and held both rankings concurrently in 2003, becoming one of only six women to achieve this feat. (Note: The six women who held the world No. 1 rankings in both singles and doubles concurrently are Martina Navratilova, Arantxa Sánchez Vicario, Martina Hingis, Lindsay Davenport, Clijsters, and Serena Williams.) Clijsters experienced rapid success on the WTA Tour upon turning professional, reaching Grand Slam finals at the 2001 and 2003 French Opens, the 2003 US Open, and the 2004 Australian Open, winning 34 singles titles, including a maiden Grand Slam title at the 2005 US Open. She retired in 2007 following a series of injuries, before returning in 2009 following the birth of her daughter. She won her second Grand Slam tournament as an unranked player at the 2009 US Open, her third tournament played upon her comeback, before winning further Grand Slam tournaments at the 2010 US Open and the 2011 Australian Open, returning to the world No. 1 ranking on 14 February 2011. She retired for a second time in September 2012 due to injuries, before announcing her return in 2020. In a period of time affected by injuries and the COVID-19 pandemic, Clijsters played and lost five matches, before announcing her permanent retirement on 12 April 2022. In total, Clijsters won 41 WTA Tour singles titles, including three titles at the 2002, 2003, and the 2010 WTA Tour Championships and seven WTA 1000 titles, and also won 11 WTA doubles titles, including two Grand Slam titles at the 2003 French Open and the 2003 Wimbledon Championships, partnering Ai Sugiyama. She also led Belgium to the 2001 Fed Cup title alongside Justine Henin; this is, to date, Belgium's only title at the Fed Cup. Clijsters was inducted into the International Tennis Hall of Fame in 2017.
- (Canada) Sharon Fichman became inactive having played her last match in November 2021.
- (Czech Republic) Lucie Hradecká (born 21 May 1985 in Prague, Czechoslovakia) A three-time Grand Slam doubles champion and 26-time WTA Tour doubles titlist, she reached her career-high doubles ranking of world No. 4 in October 2012. She retired in October 2022, her last match was at the 2022 Guadalajara Open Akron.

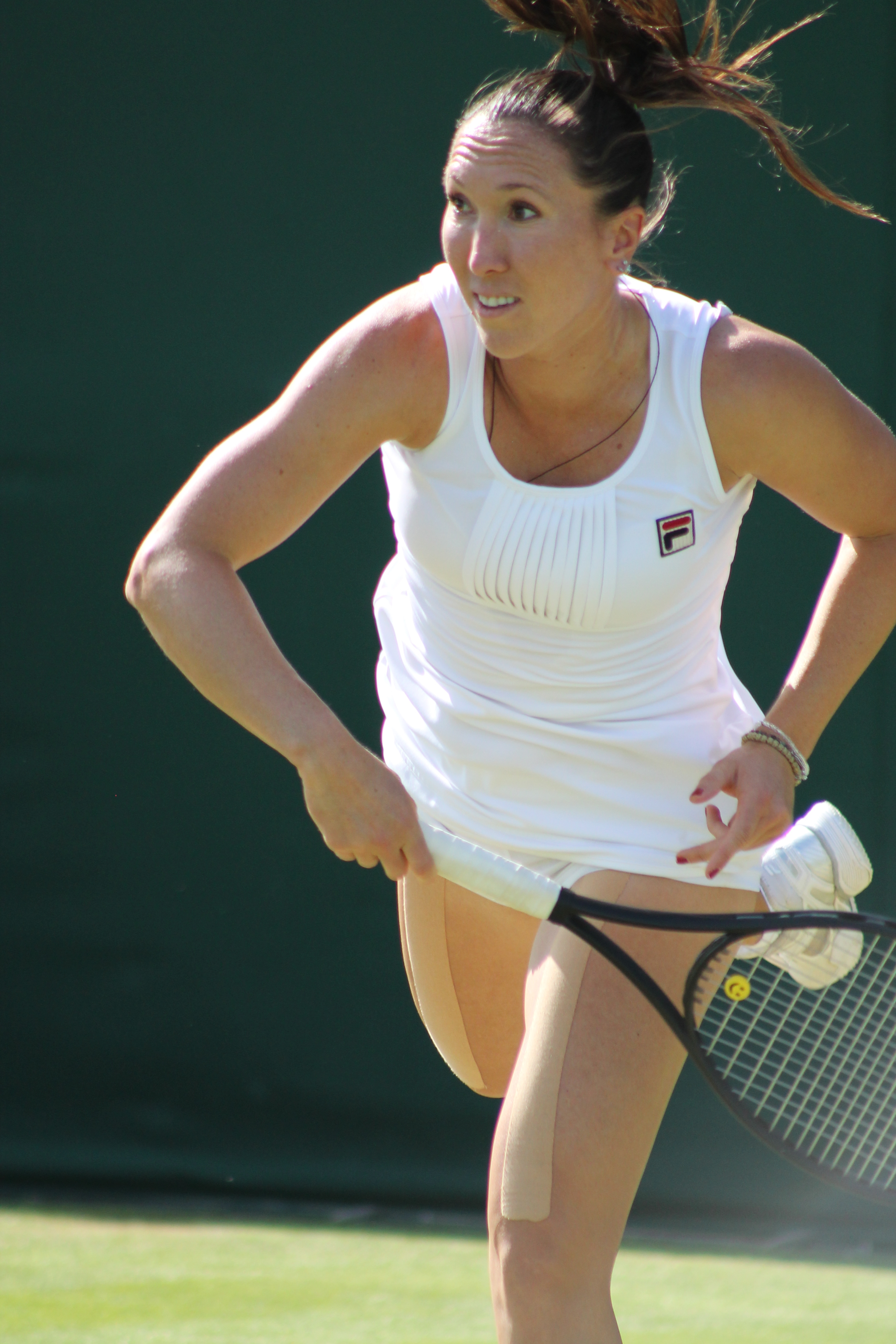
Former world No. 1 Jelena Janković (pictured in 2013)

- Jelena Janković (born 28 February 1985 in Belgrade, SFR Yugoslavia; now Serbia) turned professional in 2000. A former world No. 1 in singles, Janković first attained the ranking on 11 August 2008, and held the ranking for 18 weeks in total; her career-high doubles ranking of No. 19 in the world was attained on 9 June 2014. One of the most successful players of her era, Janković won 15 singles titles on the WTA Tour, including six at WTA 1000 level; she also won two doubles titles on the WTA Tour. At the Grand Slam level, Janković reached one singles final, at the 2008 US Open, and entered the second week on 21 further occasions. Furthermore, she won the mixed doubles title at the 2007 Wimbledon Championships, partnering Jamie Murray. Janković played her last competitive match in 2017, taking an extended break due to a severe back injury. Despite tentatively making a comeback in 2020, partnering compatriot Novak Djokovic in an exhibition mixed doubles match, Janković did not return to the WTA Tour, and eventually announced her retirement in 2022. In an interview with Serbian news outlet B92, Janković stated that she was retiring due to continuing injuries, and also as she felt she could not balance a professional tennis career with motherhood.
- Paula Kania-Choduń (born 6 November 1992 in Sosnowiec, Poland) announced her retirement from tennis in December 2022.
- (Sweden) Cornelia Lister (born 26 May 1994 in Oslo, Norway) turned professional in November 2010. Lister won one singles title on the ITF circuit, reaching a career-high singles ranking of No. 383 in the world on 7 May 2018. Known for her doubles prowess, Lister won one WTA Tour doubles title, at the 2019 Palermo International, and 25 ITF doubles titles, peaking at No. 72 in the doubles rankings on 3 February 2020. Lister announced her retirement on 10 January 2022, citing a lack of motivation and desire to compete.
- (United States) Christina McHale (born 11 May 1992 in Teaneck, New Jersey) turned professional in 2010. Played her last match at the 2022 US Open qualifying competition.
- Mandy Minella (born 22 November 1985 in Esch-sur-Alzette, Luxembourg) turned professional in 2001. she peaked at No. 66 in the WTA singles rankings in September 2012, and No. 47 in doubles in April 2013.
- Kurumi Nara (born 30 December 1991 in Osaka, Japan) turned professional in 2009. Her final tournament of her career was the Toray Pan Pacific Open in September, where she competed as a qualifying wildcard.
- Risa Ozaki (born 10 April 1994 in Kobe, Japan) She announced her retirement from tennis in 2022.
- Peng Shuai (born 8 January 1986 in Xiangtan, China) turned professional in June 2001. Peng had a career-high singles ranking of No. 14 in the world, achieved on 22 August 2011, and was a former doubles World No. 1, first attaining the ranking on 17 February 2014. She won two WTA singles titles, and reached the semifinals of the 2014 US Open. In addition, Peng also won 23 doubles titles, including two Grand Slams, at the 2013 Wimbledon Championships and the 2014 French Open, both partnering Hsieh Su-wei. In November 2021, Peng made an allegation of sexual assault against retired Chinese politician Zhang Gaoli on Weibo, and subsequently disappeared from the public eye, with her post being subject to blanket censorship in China. In February 2022, in an interview with French publication L'Équipe, conducted in the presence of officials from the Chinese Olympic Committee, Peng retracted her allegation of sexual assault, describing the events as a "misunderstanding". She also announced her retirement from the sport at the conclusion of the 2022 Winter Olympics, citing injuries and the ongoing COVID-19 pandemic as reasons for her decision.
- Květa Peschke (born 9 July 1975 in Bílovec, Czechoslovakia; now Czech Republic) turned professional in April 1993. Peschke, née Hrdličková, had a career-high singles ranking of No. 26 in the world, achieved on 7 November 2005, and was a former doubles World No. 1, first attaining the ranking on 4 July 2011. Peschke won one WTA singles title, at the 1998 Makarska Open, and also won 10 singles titles on the ITF circuit. She also reached the fourth round of the 1999 Wimbledon Championships, her best result at a Grand Slam tournament in singles. Peschke was best known for her doubles prowess, winning 36 titles, including one Grand Slam title at the 2011 Wimbledon Championships, and seven titles at WTA 1000 level. Peschke announced her retirement on 8 April 2022, playing her final match at the Charleston Open. She plans to retire officially at 2022 Wimbledon.
- (Germany) Andrea Petkovic (born 9 September 1987 in Tuzla, SFR Yugoslavia) turned professional in 2006. Petkovic, had a career-high singles ranking of No. 9 in the world, achieved on 10 October 2011. Petkovic won seven WTA singles and one WTA doubles title and also won 9 singles titles and 3 doubles on the ITF circuit. She also reached the semifinal of the 2014 French Open, her best result at a Grand Slam tournament in singles. Petkovic announced her retirement in August 2022.
- Monica Puig (born 27 September 1993 in San Juan, Puerto Rico) turned professional in 2010. She had a career-high singles ranking of No. 27 in the world, achieved on 26 September 2016; her career-high doubles ranking of No. 210 was achieved on 25 May 2015. Puig won her maiden WTA Tour singles title at the 2014 Internationaux de Strasbourg, and achieved her best result at a Grand Slam at the 2013 Wimbledon Championships, where she reached the fourth round. Puig reached worldwide prominence by winning a gold medal at the 2016 Rio Olympics, defeating top-ten players Garbiñe Muguruza and Angelique Kerber en route, becoming the first athlete ever to win a gold medal for Puerto Rico at the Summer Olympics. Despite her historic success, Puig experienced a loss of form, falling out of the top 50 in June 2017, and returning only for 11 weeks throughout the remainder of her career. Later, Puig struggled with injuries, notably to her elbow and her shoulder, and had four surgeries over a three-year period. On 13 June 2022, Puig announced her retirement from tennis, stating "my body has had enough".
- (United Kingdom) Laura Robson (born 21 January 1994 in Melbourne, Australia) turned professional in 2007. Robson was the first British woman since Samantha Smith at the 1998 Wimbledon Championships to reach the fourth round of a Grand Slam, doing so at the 2012 US Open and the 2013 Wimbledon Championships. At the 2012 Guangzhou Women's Open, Robson became the first British woman since Jo Durie in 1990 to reach a WTA Tour final, where she lost to Hsieh Su-wei. She was named WTA Newcomer of the Year for 2012 and reached a career-high singles ranking of world No. 27 on 8 July 2013. In doubles, she won a silver medal in the mixed-doubles competition at the 2012 London Olympics playing with Andy Murray, with whom she also reached the 2010 Hopman Cup final, and she attained a career-high doubles ranking of No. 82 on 17 March 2014. Robson suffered from various injuries throughout the 2014 and 2015 seasons, notably to her left (and dominant) wrist for which she underwent surgery in April 2014, resulting in multiple prolonged absences from the WTA Tour. After returning to full-time tennis in January 2016 post-injury, Robson struggled with form and did not return to the top 150 in singles tennis, and continued to struggle with injuries throughout the remainder of her career. On 16 May 2022, Robson announced her retirement from the sport, aged 28.
- Andrea Sestini Hlaváčková (born 10 August 1986 in Plzeň, Czechoslovakia; now Czech Republic) turned professional in 2004. She reached a career-high singles ranking of No. 58 in the world on 10 September 2012, after reaching the fourth round of the US Open; this would be her best result in singles at a Grand Slam. She reached one WTA Tour singles final, at the 2013 Gastein Open, and won eight singles titles on the ITF circuit. Known primarily as a doubles specialist, Sestini Hlaváčková reached a career-high ranking of No. 3 in the world on 22 October 2012. She would win 27 WTA Tour titles in doubles, including two Grand Slam titles at the 2011 French Open and the 2013 US Open, both partnering Lucie Hradecká. She would also reach the finals of the 2012 Wimbledon Championships, 2012 US Open, and 2016 Australian Open partnering Hradecká, and reached the finals of the 2017 Australian Open partnering Peng Shuai. She would also win a further Grand Slam title in mixed doubles at the 2013 US Open, partnering Max Mirnyi, and won the title at the 2017 WTA Finals, partnering Tímea Babos. Sestini Hlaváčková won three doubles titles at WTA 1000 level, and was an Olympic medallist, winning silver at the 2012 London Olympics, and finishing in fourth place at the 2016 Rio Olympics; she also won 19 doubles titles on the ITF circuit. She announced her retirement on 17 June 2022, retiring after participating in the 2022 Prague Open; this was her first tournament since 2018, having taken a break from the tour after giving birth to her daughter.
- İpek Soylu (born 15 April 1996 in Adana, Turkey) turned professional in 2012. Soylu reached a career-high singles ranking of No. 151 in the world on 31 October 2016; she also reached No. 63 in doubles on 17 April 2017. She won three doubles titles on the WTA Tour, her biggest coming at the 2016 year-end Elite Trophy.She has also won twelve singles and eighteen doubles titles on the ITF Circuit. Soylu announced her retirement from tennis in September 2022.
- (Slovenia) Katarina Srebotnik (born 12 March 1981 in Slovenj Gradec, Yugoslavia) turned professional in 1999. Srebotnik is a former world number 1 in doubles. Although she played her last match at Roland Garros in 2020, she was officially honored for her career in Portorož in September 2022.
- Stefanie Vögele (born 10 March 1990 in Leuggern, Switzerland) announced her retirement from tennis in November 2022.

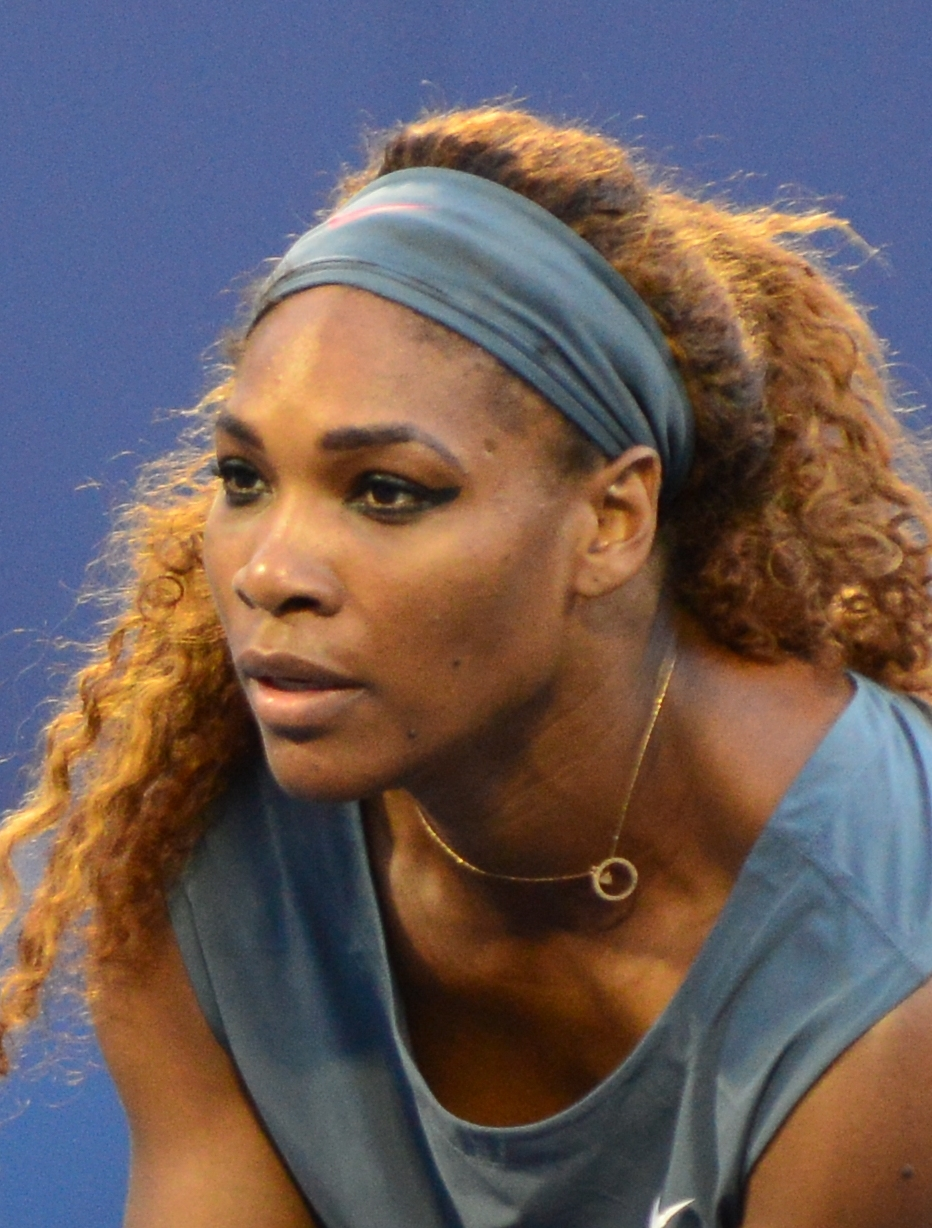
Former world no. 1 Serena Williams (pictured in 2013) announced that she would retire after the 2022 US Open.

- (United States) Serena Williams (born 26 September 1981 in Saginaw, Michigan) turned professional in 1995. Williams is a former world number 1 in both singles and doubles, first attaining the ranking in singles on July 8, 2002, holding the ranking in total for 319 total weeks, including 186 consecutive weeks between February 2013 and September 2016; she is tied with Steffi Graf for the longest consecutive period ranked at No. 1 in the world. Williams won 73 singles titles on the WTA tour, including 23 major titles; Williams holds the Open Era record for most major titles won, and is second in the all-time records behind Margaret Court. Williams won each major a minimum of three times, and won seven titles at the Australian Open, an Open Era record. Further to her 23 major singles titles, she also won a gold medal at the 2012 London Olympics, becoming the second woman to win the Career Golden Slam in singles, after Graf. Of her 73 WTA Tour singles titles, 23 were at WTA 1000 level. Notably, in 2013, Williams won 33 consecutive matches; this is the third longest winning streak of the 21st Century, behind those of Venus Williams and Iga Świątek. An accomplished doubles player, Williams also won 23 doubles titles, and became the world No. 1 doubles player in the world on 21 June 2010, holding the ranking for eight weeks in total. Williams won 14 major doubles titles, all partnering her sister Venus Williams, completing the Career Grand Slam in doubles; the only other female players to have completed the Career Grand Slam in both singles and doubles are Court and Martina Navratilova. Williams also won three Olympic gold medals in doubles, at 2000, 2008, and 2012 Olympics, becoming the most decorated tennis player in history alongside her sister, Venus Williams. Williams is the only tennis player, male or female, to have completed the Career Golden Slam in both singles and doubles. Williams also won two major titles in mixed doubles, at the 1998 Wimbledon Championships and the 1998 US Open, and reached a further two mixed doubles finals, at the 1998 French Open and 1999 Australian Open. Williams is one of the greatest competitors in the history of women's tennis, and one of the greatest tennis players of all time. Williams announced in an interview with Vogue that she would retire after the 2022 US Open, citing ongoing injuries and a desire to move away from tennis in her future career. Her career ended following a third round loss to Ajla Tomljanović; Williams defeated world No. 2 Anett Kontaveit in the second round.
- (China) Duan Yingying became inactive having played her last match in 2021.

=== Inactivity ===
- (China) Zheng Saisai became inactive after not playing for more than a year.
- Elena Vesnina became inactive after not playing for more than a year.
- (Latvia) Anastasija Sevastova In February 2022, Sevastova announced that she was taking an indefinite break from her tennis career.

== Comebacks ==
- Yanina Wickmayer (born 20 October 1989 in Lier, Belgium): After retreating from the tour due to pregnancy in October 2020 following the 2020 French Open, Wickmayer rejoined the professional circuit in her first tournament of the year at an International Tennis Federation (ITF) tournament in Porto in February 2022. In an interview with Sporza, she noted she still retained her passion for the game during her maternity leave and plans to remain on tour until at least the 2024 Summer Olympics in Paris, where she hopes to compete.
- Evgeniya Rodina

== See also ==
- 2022 WTA 125 tournaments
- 2022 ITF Women's World Tennis Tour
- 2022 ATP Tour
- International Tennis Federation
- Current tennis rankings
