= 2022 Ostrava Open =

- Date: 3–9 October
- Edition: 3rd
- Category: WTA 500
- Draw: 28S / 24Q / 16D
- Prize money: $757,900
- Surface: Hard (Indoor)
- Location: Ostrava, Czech Republic

Champions

Singles
- (Czech Republic) Barbora Krejčíková

Doubles
- (United States) Caty McNally / (United States) Alycia Parks
- Ostrava Open

The 2022 Ostrava Open (also known as the AGEL Open for sponsorship purposes) was a WTA tournament organised for female professional tennis players on indoor hard courts. The event took place at the Ostravar Aréna in Ostrava, Czech Republic, from 3 through 9 October 2022.

The event was held on a third consecutive year in the alternative sporting calendar due to the cancellation of tournaments in China during the 2022 season because of the ongoing COVID-19 pandemic, as well as the suspension of tournaments in China following former WTA player Peng Shuai's allegation of sexual assault against a Chinese government official, and the tournaments in Russia due to the ongoing war with Ukraine.

== Champions ==
=== Singles ===
- (Czech Republic) Barbora Krejčíková def. (Poland) Iga Świątek 5–7, 7–6^{(7–4)}, 6–3

This is Krejčíková's second title of the year and fifth of her career.

=== Doubles ===
- (United States) Caty McNally / (United States) Alycia Parks def. (Poland) Alicja Rosolska / (New Zealand) Erin Routliffe, 6–3, 6–2

== Singles main draw entrants ==
=== Seeds ===
Country	Player	Rank^{1}	Seed
POL	Iga Świątek	1	1
ESP	Paula Badosa	3	2
EST	Anett Kontaveit	4	3
GRE	Maria Sakkari	7	4
	Daria Kasatkina	11	5
SUI	Belinda Bencic	14	6
BRA	Beatriz Haddad Maia	15	7
LAT	Jeļena Ostapenko	17	8

- Rankings are as of September 26, 2022.

=== Other entrants ===
The following players received wildcards into the singles main draw:

- (Czech Republic) Petra Kvitová
- (Czech Republic) Tereza Martincová
- (Czech Republic) Karolína Muchová

The following players received entry from the qualifying draw:

- Anna Blinkova
- (Canada) Eugenie Bouchard
- (United States) Caty McNally
- (United States) Alycia Parks
- (United States) Bernarda Pera
- (Australia) Ajla Tomljanović

=== Withdrawals ===
During the tournament

- (Switzerland) Belinda Bencic (left foot injury)

=== Retirements ===
- (Estonia) Anett Kontaveit (lower back injury)
- (Australia) Ajla Tomljanović (left knee injury)

== Doubles main draw entrants ==
=== Seeds ===
Country	Player	Country	Player	Rank^{†}	Seed
USA	Desirae Krawczyk	NED	Demi Schuurs	27	1
KAZ	Anna Danilina	BRA	Beatriz Haddad Maia	43	2
POL	Alicja Rosolska	NZL	Erin Routliffe	71	3
BEL	Kirsten Flipkens	GER	Laura Siegemund	82	4

- ^{1} Rankings as of September 26, 2022.

=== Other entrants ===
The following pair received a wildcard into the doubles main draw:

- (Czech Republic) Nikola Bartůňková / (Czech Republic) Barbora Palicová

=== Withdrawals ===
Before the tournament

- (Chinese Taipei) Chan Hao-ching / (China) Zhang Shuai → replaced by (Spain) Georgina García Pérez / (United States) Ingrid Neel
- (Belgium) Kirsten Flipkens / (Spain) Sara Sorribes Tormo → replaced by Angelina Gabueva / Anastasia Zakharova
- (Germany) Vivian Heisen / (Romania) Monica Niculescu → replaced by (Germany) Anna-Lena Friedsam / (Germany) Vivian Heisen
- (United States) Nicole Melichar-Martinez / (Germany) Laura Siegemund → replaced by (Czech Republic) Lucie Hradecká / (Czech Republic) Linda Nosková
