= 2022 Ostrava Open – Doubles =

Doubles
- 2022 Ostrava Open

Final
- Champions: (United States) Caty McNally (United States) Alycia Parks
- Runners-up: (Poland) Alicja Rosolska (New Zealand) Erin Routliffe
- Score: 6–3, 6–2

Events
Singles	Doubles
- Ostrava Open

Caty McNally and Alycia Parks defeated Alicja Rosolska and Erin Routliffe in the final, 6–3, 6–2 to win the doubles tennis title at the 2022 Ostrava Open.

Sania Mirza and Zhang Shuai were the reigning champions, but did not participate.

== Seeds ==
1. (United States) Desirae Krawczyk / (Netherlands) Demi Schuurs (quarterfinals)
2. (Kazakhstan) Anna Danilina / (Brazil) Beatriz Haddad Maia (semifinals)
3. (Poland) Alicja Rosolska / (New Zealand) Erin Routliffe (final)
4. (Belgium) Kirsten Flipkens / (Germany) Laura Siegemund (semifinals)

== Draw ==
Key

- Q = Qualifier
- WC = Wild card
- LL = Lucky loser
- Alt = Alternate
- ITF = ITF entry
- PR = Protected ranking
- SR = Special ranking
- SE = Special exempt
- JE = Junior exempt
- JR = Junior Accelerator Programme entrant
- CO = College Accelerator Programme entrant
- NG = Next Gen Accelerator Program entrant
- w/o = Walkover
- r = Retired
- d = Defaulted

=== Draw ===
First round
1	(United States) D Krawczyk (Netherlands) D Schuurs	6	6
(Germany) A-L Friedsam (Germany) V Heisen	3	4
(United States) C McNally (United States) A Parks	6	6
(Czech Republic) L Hradecká (Czech Republic) L Nosková	4	3
4	(Belgium) K Flipkens (Germany) L Siegemund	6	6
(Hungary) A Bondár (Belgium) K Zimmermann	4	2
(Norway) U Eikeri (Slovakia) T Mihalíková	6	2	[10]
A Gabueva; A Zakharova	4	6	[8]
(United Kingdom) A Barnett (United Kingdom) O Nicholls	6	4	[10]
PR	(Spain) G García Pérez (United States) I Neel	3	6	[4]
(Georgia (country)) O Kalashnikova (Poland) P Kania-Choduń	4	3
3	(Poland) A Rosolska (New Zealand) E Routliffe	6	6
(Georgia (country)) N Dzalamidze; A Panova	6^{4}	4
WC	(Czech Republic) N Bartůňková (Czech Republic) B Palicová	7^{7}	6
(Czech Republic) R Voráčová (China) Xiy Wang	2	4
2	(Kazakhstan) A Danilina (Brazil) B Haddad Maia	6	6

Quarterfinals
1	(United States) D Krawczyk (Netherlands) D Schuurs	1	2
(United States) C McNally (United States) A Parks	6	6
4	(Belgium) K Flipkens (Germany) L Siegemund	6	6
(Norway) U Eikeri (Slovakia) T Mihalíková	4	3
(United Kingdom) A Barnett (United Kingdom) O Nicholls	1	2
3	(Poland) A Rosolska (New Zealand) E Routliffe	6	6
WC	(Czech Republic) N Bartůňková (Czech Republic) B Palicová	6^{4}	3
2	(Kazakhstan) A Danilina (Brazil) B Haddad Maia	7^{7}	6

Semifinals
(United States) C McNally (United States) A Parks	4	6	[10]
4	(Belgium) K Flipkens (Germany) L Siegemund	6	1	[7]
3	(Poland) A Rosolska (New Zealand) E Routliffe	6	6
2	(Kazakhstan) A Danilina (Brazil) B Haddad Maia	4	2

Final
(United States) C McNally (United States) A Parks	6	6
3	(Poland) A Rosolska (New Zealand) E Routliffe	3	2
