= 2018 Moscow River Cup =

- Date: 23–29 July
- Edition: 1st
- Category: International
- Draw: 32S / 16D
- Prize money: $750,000
- Surface: Clay
- Location: Moscow, Russia
- Venue: National Tennis Center

Champions

Singles
- (Serbia) Olga Danilović

Doubles
- (Russia) Anastasia Potapova / (Russia) Vera Zvonareva
- Moscow River Cup

The 2018 Moscow River Cup was a women's tennis tournament played on outdoor clay courts. It was the first edition of the event and part of the WTA International tournaments of the 2018 WTA Tour. It took place at the National Tennis Center in Moscow, Russia from 23 through 29 July 2018.

== Singles main-draw entrants ==
=== Seeds ===
Country	Player	Rank^{1}	Seed
GER	Julia Görges	10	1
RUS	Daria Kasatkina	13	2
LAT	Anastasija Sevastova	22	3
CZE	Kateřina Siniaková	36	4
BLR	Aliaksandra Sasnovich	41	5
~~ROU~~	~~Irina-Camelia Begu~~	~~42~~	~~6~~
FRA	Alizé Cornet	48	7
EST	Kaia Kanepi	51	8

- ^{1} Rankings as of July 16, 2018.

=== Other entrants ===
The following players received wildcards into the singles main draw:

- (Germany) Antonia Lottner
- (Russia) Anastasia Potapova

The following players received entry using a protected ranking into the singles main draw:

- (Germany) Laura Siegemund

The following players received entry from the qualifying draw:

- (Spain) Paula Badosa Gibert
- (Italy) Deborah Chiesa
- (Russia) Varvara Flink
- (Greece) Valentini Grammatikopoulou
- (Russia) Valentyna Ivakhnenko
- (Italy) Martina Trevisan

The following players received entry as lucky losers:

- (Romania) Irina Bara
- (Serbia) Olga Danilović

=== Withdrawals ===
Before the tournament

- (Romania) Irina-Camelia Begu → replaced by (Romania) Irina Bara
- (Romania) Mihaela Buzărnescu → replaced by (Bulgaria) Viktoriya Tomova
- (Italy) Sara Errani → replaced by (Slovakia) Anna Karolína Schmiedlová
- (Slovenia) Polona Hercog → replaced by (Russia) Vera Zvonareva
- (Croatia) Petra Martić → replaced by (Serbia) Olga Danilović
- (Kazakhstan) Yulia Putintseva → replaced by (Slovenia) Tamara Zidanšek
- (Russia) Elena Vesnina → replaced by (Russia) Ekaterina Alexandrova

During the tournament

- (Latvia) Anastasija Sevastova

=== Retirements ===
- (Slovenia) Tamara Zidanšek

== Doubles main-draw entrants ==
=== Seeds ===
Country	Player	Country	Player	Rank^{1}	Seed
SUI	Xenia Knoll	SWE	Johanna Larsson	87	1
RUS	Veronika Kudermetova	BLR	Lidziya Marozava	117	2
AUS	Monique Adamczak	AUS	Jessica Moore	129	3
RUS	Natela Dzalamidze	AUS	Anastasia Rodionova	132	4

- ^{1} Rankings as of July 16, 2018.

=== Other entrants ===
The following pairs received wildcards into the doubles main draw:

- (Russia) Sofya Lansere / (Kazakhstan) Elena Rybakina
- (Russia) Polina Monova / (Belgium) Maryna Zanevska

== Champions ==
=== Singles ===
- (Serbia) Olga Danilović def. (Russia) Anastasia Potapova, 7–5, 6–7^{(1–7)}, 6–4

=== Doubles ===
- (Russia) Anastasia Potapova / (Russia) Vera Zvonareva def. (Russia) Alexandra Panova / (Kazakhstan) Galina Voskoboeva, 6–0, 6–3
