= 2018 Tashkent Open – Doubles =

Doubles
- 2018 Tashkent Open

Final
- Champions: (Serbia) Olga Danilović (Slovenia) Tamara Zidanšek
- Runners-up: (Romania) Irina-Camelia Begu (Romania) Raluca Olaru
- Score: 7–5, 6–3

Details
- Draw: 16
- Seeds: 4

Events
Singles	Doubles
← 2017 ·	Tashkent Open	· 2019 →

Tímea Babos and Andrea Sestini Hlaváčková were the defending champions, but they chose to compete alongside different partners in Wuhan instead.

Olga Danilović and Tamara Zidanšek won the title, defeating Irina-Camelia Begu and Raluca Olaru in the final, 7–5, 6–3.

== Seeds ==
1. (Romania) Irina-Camelia Begu / (Romania) Raluca Olaru (final)
2. (Japan) Nao Hibino / (Georgia (country)) Oksana Kalashnikova (semifinals)
3. (Chile) Alexa Guarachi / (United States) Desirae Krawczyk (quarterfinals)
4. (Slovenia) Dalila Jakupović / (Belarus) Vera Lapko (quarterfinals)

== Draw ==
=== Key ===
- Q = Qualifier
- WC = Wild card
- LL = Lucky loser
- Alt = Alternate
- SE = Special exempt
- PR = Protected ranking
- ITF = ITF entry
- JE = Junior exempt
- w/o = Walkover
- r = Retired
- d = Defaulted
- SR = Special ranking

=== Draw ===
First round
1	(Romania) I-C Begu (Romania) R Olaru	7^{7}	6
(Russia) A Blinkova (Hungary) F Stollár	6^{1}	4
(Poland) P Kania (Russia) Y Sizikova	6	6
(Czech Republic) B Štefková (Czech Republic) R Voráčová	3	1
3	(Chile) A Guarachi (United States) D Krawczyk	7	4	[10]
(Australia) M Adamczak (Australia) J Moore	5	6	[8]
(Russia) M Gasparyan (Russia) A Potapova	7	6
WC	(Uzbekistan) N Abduraimova (Russia) A Kalinskaya	5	3
(Serbia) O Danilović (Slovenia) T Zidanšek	2	6	[10]
(Germany) N Geuer (Netherlands) B Schoofs	6	3	[4]
(Russia) A Panova (Kazakhstan) G Voskoboeva	6	2	[6]
4	(Slovenia) D Jakupović (Belarus) V Lapko	3	6	[10]
(Ukraine) K Kozlova (Russia) V Zvonareva	6	7
WC	(Uzbekistan) A Amanmuradova (Canada) E Bouchard	2	5
(Slovakia) C Škamlová (Netherlands) E Wacanno	0	2
2	(Japan) N Hibino (Georgia (country)) O Kalashnikova	6	6

Quarterfinals
1	(Romania) I-C Begu (Romania) R Olaru	3	6	[12]
(Poland) P Kania (Russia) Y Sizikova	6	2	[10]
3	(Chile) A Guarachi (United States) D Krawczyk	2	4
(Russia) M Gasparyan (Russia) A Potapova	6	6
(Serbia) O Danilović (Slovenia) T Zidanšek	7	6
4	(Slovenia) D Jakupović (Belarus) V Lapko	5	4
(Ukraine) K Kozlova (Russia) V Zvonareva	4	3
2	(Japan) N Hibino (Georgia (country)) O Kalashnikova	6	6

Semifinals
1	(Romania) I-C Begu (Romania) R Olaru	4	6	[10]
(Russia) M Gasparyan (Russia) A Potapova	6	2	[6]
(Serbia) O Danilović (Slovenia) T Zidanšek	4	7^{11}	[10]
2	(Japan) N Hibino (Georgia (country)) O Kalashnikova	6	6^{9}	[4]

Final
1	(Romania) I-C Begu (Romania) R Olaru	5	3
(Serbia) O Danilović (Slovenia) T Zidanšek	7	6
