= 2022 İstanbul Cup – Doubles =

Doubles
- 2022 İstanbul Cup

Final
- Champions: (Czech Republic) Marie Bouzková (Spain) Sara Sorribes Tormo
- Runners-up: Natela Dzalamidze; Kamilla Rakhimova
- Score: 6–3, 6–4

Events
| Singles | Doubles |
- İstanbul Cup

Marie Bouzková and Sara Sorribes Tormo defeated Natela Dzalamidze and Kamilla Rakhimova in the final, 6–3, 6–4 to win the doubles title at the 2022 İstanbul Cup.

Veronika Kudermetova and Elise Mertens were the defending champions, but the pair withdrew from the tournament before their first-round match.

== Seeds ==
1. Veronika Kudermetova / (Belgium) Elise Mertens (withdrew)
2. (United States) Caty McNally / (Belgium) Alison Van Uytvanck (withdrew)
3. (Czech Republic) Marie Bouzková / (Spain) Sara Sorribes Tormo (champions)
4. (United States) Kaitlyn Christian / Lidziya Marozava (quarterfinals)

== Draw ==
Key

- Q = Qualifier
- WC = Wild card
- LL = Lucky loser
- Alt = Alternate
- ITF = ITF entry
- PR = Protected ranking
- SR = Special ranking
- SE = Special exempt
- JE = Junior exempt
- JR = Junior Accelerator Programme entrant
- CO = College Accelerator Programme entrant
- NG = Next Gen Accelerator Program entrant
- w/o = Walkover
- r = Retired
- d = Defaulted

=== Draw ===
First Round
Alt | A Gabueva; A Zakharova | 3 | 5
(United Kingdom) A Barnett (United Kingdom) O Nicholls | 6 | 7
(Germany) J Lohoff (United Kingdom) S Murray Sharan | 7 | 2 | [10]
(Poland) K Piter (Belgium) K Zimmermann | 5 | 6 | [3]
4 | (United States) K Christian; L Marozava | 6 | 6
(France) E Lechemia (United States) I Neel | 4 | 3
N Dzalamidze; K Rakhimova | 6 | 6
(Hungary) A Bondár (Czech Republic) R Voráčová | 3 | 3
WC | (Turkey) B Cengiz (Turkey) İ Öz | 5 | 6 | [10]
PR | (China) X Han; Y Sizikova | 7 | 3 | [8]
WC | (Turkey) A Aksu (Turkey) Z Sönmez | 0 | 3
3 | (Czech Republic) M Bouzková (Spain) S Sorribes Tormo | 6 | 6
(Slovakia) T Mihalíková (Belgium) G Minnen | 1 | 5
(Sweden) R Peterson; A Potapova | 6 | 7
(Georgia (country)) O Kalashnikova (Japan) M Kato | 6 | 6
Alt | M Melnikova; A Tikhonova | 4 | 4

Quarterfinals
(United Kingdom) A Barnett (United Kingdom) O Nicholls | 7^{7} | 2 | [10]
(Germany) J Lohoff (United Kingdom) S Murray Sharan | 6^{1} | 6 | [3]
4 | (United States) K Christian; L Marozava | 5 | 3
N Dzalamidze; K Rakhimova | 7 | 6
WC | (Turkey) B Cengiz (Turkey) İ Öz | 5 | 5
3 | (Czech Republic) M Bouzková (Spain) S Sorribes Tormo | 7 | 7
(Sweden) R Peterson; A Potapova
(Georgia (country)) O Kalashnikova (Japan) M Kato | w/o

Semifinals
(United Kingdom) A Barnett (United Kingdom) O Nicholls | 6 | 4 | [8]
N Dzalamidze; K Rakhimova | 0 | 6 | [10]
3 | (Czech Republic) M Bouzková (Spain) S Sorribes Tormo | 6 | 6
(Georgia (country)) O Kalashnikova (Japan) M Kato | 4 | 3

Final
N Dzalamidze; K Rakhimova | 3 | 4
3 | (Czech Republic) M Bouzková (Spain) S Sorribes Tormo | 6 | 6
