= 2019 Tashkent Open – Singles =

Singles
- 2019 Tashkent Open

Final
- Champion: (Belgium) Alison Van Uytvanck
- Runner-up: (Romania) Sorana Cîrstea
- Score: 6–2, 4–6, 6–4

Details
- Draw: 32
- Seeds: 8

Events
Singles	Doubles
← 2018 ·	Tashkent Open

Margarita Gasparyan was the defending champion. but lost in the second round to Danka Kovinić.

Alison Van Uytvanck won the title, defeating 2008 champion Sorana Cîrstea in the final 6–2, 4–6, 6–4.

== Seeds ==
1. (Slovakia) Viktória Kužmová (quarterfinals)
2. (Russia) Margarita Gasparyan (second round)
3. (Belgium) Alison Van Uytvanck (champion)
4. (Latvia) Jeļena Ostapenko (first round, retired)
5. (Czech Republic) Kristýna Plíšková (semifinals)
6. (Germany) Tatjana Maria (second round)
7. (Hungary) Tímea Babos (second round)
8. (Romania) Sorana Cîrstea (final)

== Draw ==
=== Key ===
- Q = Qualifier
- WC = Wild card
- LL = Lucky loser
- Alt = Alternate
- ITF = ITF entry
- PR = Protected ranking
- SR = Special ranking
- SE = Special exempt
- JE = Junior exempt
- JR = Junior Accelerator Programme entrant
- CO = College Accelerator Programme entrant
- NG = Next Gen Accelerator Program entrant
- w/o = Walkover
- r = Retired
- d = Defaulted

=== Finals ===
Semifinals
5	(Czech Republic) Kristýna Plíšková	3	5
3	(Belgium) Alison Van Uytvanck	6	7
(Ukraine) Katarina Zavatska	0	3
8	(Romania) Sorana Cîrstea	6	6

Final
3	(Belgium) Alison Van Uytvanck	6	4	6
8	(Romania) Sorana Cîrstea	2	6	4

=== Top half ===
First round
1	(Slovakia) V Kužmová	7^{7}	6
(United States) F Di Lorenzo	6^{3}	3
PR	(Ukraine) K Bondarenko	2	2
(Belgium) G Minnen	6	6
(Poland) K Kawa	7	6
(Russia) V Diatchenko	5	3
(Italy) J Paolini	4	4
5	(Czech Republic) Kr Plíšková	6	6
3	(Belgium) A Van Uytvanck	6	6
Q	(Russia) L Samsonova	0	1
WC	(Uzbekistan) N Abduraimova	1	5
(Romania) M Niculescu	6	7
(France) P Parmentier	6	6
(Serbia) A Krunić	1	2
(Belgium) K Flipkens	2	5
7	(Hungary) T Babos	6	7

Second round
1	(Slovakia) V Kužmová	5	6	7^{9}
(Belgium) G Minnen	7	3	6^{7}
(Poland) K Kawa	5	6	4
5	(Czech Republic) Kr Plíšková	7	3	6
3	(Belgium) A Van Uytvanck	6	6
(Romania) M Niculescu	2	1
(France) P Parmentier	2	6	6
7	(Hungary) T Babos	6	4	3

Quarterfinals
1	(Slovakia) V Kužmová	3	4
5	(Czech Republic) Kr Plíšková	6	6
3	(Belgium) A Van Uytvanck	6	6
(France) P Parmentier	2	4

Semifinals
5	(Czech Republic) Kr Plíšková	3	5
3	(Belgium) A Van Uytvanck	6	7

=== Bottom half ===
First round
6	(Germany) T Maria	7^{7}	6
Q	(Belarus) O Govortsova	6^{5}	1
Q	(United Kingdom) H Dart	4	4
(Russia) A Kalinskaya	6	6
Q	(Czech Republic) T Martincová	6^{4}	6	6
(Romania) I-C Begu	7^{7}	4	4
(Ukraine) K Zavatska	6	5
4	(Latvia) J Ostapenko	3	4^{r}
8	(Romania) S Cîrstea	6	6
PR	(Czech Republic) D Allertová	1	4
WC	(Uzbekistan) A Amanmuradova	3	1
(Belgium) Y Bonaventure	6	6
WC	(Uzbekistan) S Sharipova	0	7	2
(Montenegro) D Kovinić	6	5	6
(Switzerland) S Vögele	4	6	4
2	(Russia) M Gasparyan	6	4	6

Second round
6	(Germany) T Maria	6	5	2
(Russia) A Kalinskaya	3	7	6
Q	(Czech Republic) T Martincová	4	4
(Ukraine) K Zavatska	6	6
8	(Romania) S Cîrstea	3	6	7
(Belgium) Y Bonaventure	6	3	5
(Montenegro) D Kovinić	7	6
2	(Russia) M Gasparyan	5	4

Quarterfinals
(Russia) A Kalinskaya	0	2
(Ukraine) K Zavatska	6	6
8	(Romania) S Cîrstea	7	5	6
(Montenegro) D Kovinić	5	7	1

Semifinals
(Ukraine) K Zavatska	0	3
8	(Romania) S Cîrstea	6	6

== Qualifying ==
=== Seeds ===
1. (Romania) Mihaela Buzărnescu (first round, retired)
2. (United Kingdom) Harriet Dart (qualified)
3. (Russia) Liudmila Samsonova (qualified)
4. (Czech Republic) Tereza Martincová (qualified)
5. (Romania) Ana Bogdan (qualifying competition)
6. (Russia) Varvara Flink (qualifying competition)
7. (Slovenia) Dalila Jakupović (first round)
8. (France) Chloé Paquet (qualifying competition)

=== Qualifiers ===
1. (Belarus) Olga Govortsova
2. (United Kingdom) Harriet Dart
3. (Russia) Liudmila Samsonova
4. (Czech Republic) Tereza Martincová

=== Qualifying draw ===
==== First qualifier ====
First round
1	(Romania) Mihaela Buzărnescu	4	0^{r}
(Romania) Jaqueline Cristian	6	0
(Belarus) Olga Govortsova	6	6
7	(Slovenia) Dalila Jakupović	1	0

Qualifying competition
(Romania) Jaqueline Cristian	4	6	1
(Belarus) Olga Govortsova	6	4	6

==== Second qualifier ====
First round
2	(United Kingdom) Harriet Dart	7^{7}	6
(Russia) Valeria Savinykh	6^{5}	2
WC	(Uzbekistan) Milana Maslenkova	1	0
5	(Romania) Ana Bogdan	6	6

Qualifying competition
2	(United Kingdom) Harriet Dart	3	6	6
5	(Romania) Ana Bogdan	6	3	3

==== Third qualifier ====
First round
3	(Russia) Liudmila Samsonova	6	6
WC	(Kazakhstan) Gozal Ainitdinova	2	2
(United Kingdom) Naomi Broady	3	6	1
6	(Russia) Varvara Flink	6	3	6

Qualifying competition
3	(Russia) Liudmila Samsonova	6	7
6	(Russia) Varvara Flink	3	5

==== Fourth qualifier ====
First round
4	(Czech Republic) Tereza Martincová	6	6
(Russia) Yana Sizikova	3	0
(India) Ankita Raina	6^{8}	6	5
8	(France) Chloé Paquet	7^{10}	3	7

Qualifying competition
4	(Czech Republic) Tereza Martincová	7^{7}	6
8	(France) Chloé Paquet	6^{4}	1
