= 2018 Tashkent Open =

- Date: September 24–29
- Edition: 20th
- Category: WTA International
- Draw: 32S / 16D
- Prize money: $250,000
- Surface: Hard
- Location: Tashkent, Uzbekistan
- Venue: Olympic Tennis School

Champions

Singles
- (Russia) Margarita Gasparyan

Doubles
- (Serbia) Olga Danilović / (Slovenia) Tamara Zidanšek
← 2017 ·	Tashkent Open	· 2019 →

The 2018 Tashkent Open was a WTA International tennis tournament played on outdoor hard courts. It was the 20th edition of the Tashkent Open, on the 2018 WTA Tour. It took place at the Olympic Tennis School in Tashkent, Uzbekistan, between September 24 and 29, 2018.

== Finals ==
=== Singles ===
(Russia) Margarita Gasparyan defeated (Russia) Anastasia Potapova 6–2, 6–1

- It was Gasparyan's only singles title of the year and the 2nd of her career.

=== Doubles ===
(Serbia) Olga Danilović / (Slovenia) Tamara Zidanšek defeated (Romania) Irina-Camelia Begu / (Romania) Raluca Olaru, 7–5, 6–3

== Points and prize money ==
=== Point distribution ===
Event	W	F	SF	QF	Round of 16	Round of 32	Q	Q2	Q1
Singles	280	180	110	60	30	1	18	12	1
Doubles	280	180	110	60	1	—	—	—	—

=== Prize money ===
Event	W	F	SF	QF	Round of 16	Round of 32^{1}	Q2	Q1
Singles	$43,000	$21,400	$11,500	$6,200	$3,420	$2,220	$1,285	$750
Doubles	$12,300	$6,400	$3,435	$1,820	$960	—	—	—
Doubles prize money per team

_{^{1} Qualifiers prize money is also the round of 32 prize money}

== Singles main-draw entrants ==
=== Seeds ===
Country	Player	Rank^{1}	Seed
ROU	Irina-Camelia Begu	55	1
BLR	Vera Lapko	66	2
SLO	Tamara Zidanšek	72	3
SUI	Stefanie Vögele	73	4
GER	Tatjana Maria	74	5
SVK	Anna Karolína Schmiedlová	79	6
RUS	Evgeniya Rodina	84	7
SLO	Dalila Jakupović	89	8

- ^{1} Rankings as of September 17, 2017

=== Other entrants ===
The following players received wildcards into the singles main draw:

- (Uzbekistan) Nigina Abduraimova
- (Russia) Anna Kalinskaya
- (Russia) Vera Zvonareva

The following players received entry using protected rankings:

- (Russia) Margarita Gasparyan
- (Serbia) Bojana Jovanovski Petrović

The following players received entry from the qualifying draw:

- (Serbia) Ivana Jorović
- (Russia) Anastasia Potapova
- (Serbia) Dejana Radanović
- (Hungary) Fanny Stollár

=== Withdrawals ===
- (Russia) Vitalia Diatchenko → replaced by (Ukraine) Marta Kostyuk
- (France) Pauline Parmentier → replaced by (Japan) Nao Hibino

== Doubles main-draw entrants ==
=== Seeds ===
Country	Player	Country	Player	Rank^{1}	Seed
ROU	Irina-Camelia Begu	ROU	Raluca Olaru	77	1
JPN	Nao Hibino	GEO	Oksana Kalashnikova	119	2
CHI	Alexa Guarachi	USA	Desirae Krawczyk	151	3
SLO	Dalila Jakupović	BLR	Vera Lapko	152	4

- ^{1} Rankings as of September 17, 2017

=== Other entrants ===
The following pairs received wildcards into the doubles main draw:

- (Uzbekistan) Nigina Abduraimova / (Russia) Anna Kalinskaya
- (Uzbekistan) Akgul Amanmuradova / (Canada) Eugenie Bouchard
