= 2022 Prague Open =

Women's tennis tournament

- Date: 25–31 July
- Edition: 13th
- Category: WTA 250
- Draw: 32S / 16D
- Surface: Hard / outdoor
- Location: Prague, Czech Republic
- Venue: TK Sparta Prague

Champions

Singles
- (Czech Republic) Marie Bouzková

Doubles
- Anastasia Potapova / Yana Sizikova
- WTA Prague Open

The 2022 Prague Open (branded as the 2022 Livesport Prague Open for sponsorship reasons) was a professional women's tennis tournament played on outdoor hard courts at the TK Sparta Prague. It was the 13th (WTA and non-WTA) edition of the tournament and part of the 2022 WTA Tour, classified as a WTA 250 tournament. It took place in Prague, Czech Republic from 25 to 31 July 2022. This was the second edition of the tournament held on outdoor hard courts, as opposed to clay courts in previous editions.

== Finals ==
=== Singles ===
(Czech Republic) Marie Bouzková defeated Anastasia Potapova, 6–0, 6–3.

- It was Bouzková’s first WTA Tour singles title of her career.

=== Doubles ===
Anastasia Potapova / Yana Sizikova defeated Angelina Gabueva / Anastasia Zakharova, 6–3, 6–4

== Singles main draw entrants ==
=== Seeds ===
Country	Player	Rank^{†}	Seed
EST	Anett Kontaveit	2	1
CZE	Barbora Krejčíková	19	2
BEL	Elise Mertens	30	3
ROU	Sorana Cîrstea	33	4
FRA	Alizé Cornet	37	5
BEL	Alison Van Uytvanck	40	6
	Anastasia Potapova	63	7
CZE	Marie Bouzková	64	8

^{†} Rankings are as of 18 July 2022.

=== Other entrants ===
The following players received wildcard entry into the singles main draw:

- (Czech Republic) Lucie Havlíčková
- (Estonia) Anett Kontaveit
- (Czech Republic) Linda Nosková

The following players received entry from the qualifying draw:

- (Slovenia) Dalila Jakupović
- (Czech Republic) Barbora Palicová
- (Czech Republic) Dominika Šalková
- Oksana Selekhmeteva
- (China) Wang Qiang
- Anastasia Zakharova

The following players received entry as lucky losers:

- (Japan) Nao Hibino
- (Austria) Sinja Kraus
- Natalia Vikhlyantseva

=== Withdrawals ===
Before the tournament

- Ekaterina Alexandrova → replaced by (Georgia (country)) Ekaterine Gorgodze
- (Switzerland) Belinda Bencic → replaced by Anna Blinkova
- (Italy) Lucia Bronzetti → replaced by (Japan) Nao Hibino
- (United Kingdom) Harriet Dart → replaced by (Switzerland) Ylena In-Albon
- (France) Océane Dodin → replaced by Vitalia Diatchenko
- (Brazil) Beatriz Haddad Maia → replaced by (France) Chloé Paquet
- (Czech Republic) Petra Kvitová → replaced by (Austria) Sinja Kraus
- (Czech Republic) Karolína Muchová → replaced by Natalia Vikhlyantseva
- (Croatia) Donna Vekić → replaced by (Bulgaria) Viktoriya Tomova

== Doubles main draw entrants ==
=== Seeds ===
Country	Player	Country	Player	Rank^{†}	Seed
~~BEL~~	~~Kirsten Flipkens~~	~~BEL~~	~~Alison Van Uytvanck~~	~~137~~	~~1~~
CHN	Han Xinyun		Alexandra Panova	141	2
JPN	Miyu Kato	GBR	Samantha Murray Sharan	150	3
	Anastasia Potapova		Yana Sizikova	159	4

^{†} Rankings are as of 18 July 2022.

=== Other entrants ===
The following pairs received wildcard entry into the doubles main draw:

- (Czech Republic) Lucie Havlíčková / (Czech Republic) Linda Nosková
- (Czech Republic) Barbora Palicová / (Czech Republic) Dominika Šalková

The following pairs received entry using protected rankings:

- (Czech Republic) Lucie Hradecká / (Czech Republic) Andrea Sestini Hlaváčková
- (Poland) Magda Linette / (Belgium) Yanina Wickmayer

The following pair received entry as alternates:

- Angelina Gabueva / Anastasia Zakharova

=== Withdrawals ===
- (Romania) Irina Bara / (Georgia (country)) Ekaterine Gorgodze → replaced by Alena Fomina-Klotz / Ekaterina Yashina
- (Belgium) Kirsten Flipkens / (Belgium) Alison Van Uytvanck → replaced by Angelina Gabueva / Anastasia Zakharova
- (Germany) Julia Lohoff / (Romania) Laura Ioana Paar → replaced by (Czech Republic) Anastasia Dețiuc / (Czech Republic) Miriam Kolodziejová
- (United States) Ingrid Neel / (Netherlands) Rosalie van der Hoek → replaced by (United States) Ingrid Neel / (Australia) Astra Sharma
