= 2018 Moscow River Cup – Singles =

Singles
- 2018 Moscow River Cup

Final
- Champion: (Serbia) Olga Danilović
- Runner-up: (Russia) Anastasia Potapova
- Score: 7–5, 6–7^{(1–7)}, 6–4

Events
Singles	Doubles
- Moscow River Cup

This was the first edition of the tournament.

Olga Danilović won her first WTA Tour title, defeating Anastasia Potapova in the final, 7–5, 6–7^{(1–7)}, 6–4. Danilović became the first player born after 2000 to win a WTA singles title, and the first lucky loser to win a singles title since Andrea Jaeger in 1980. This was the first WTA Tour final between two players under 18 since Tatiana Golovin and Nicole Vaidišová played in the final of the 2005 AIG Japan Open Tennis Championships.

== Seeds ==
1. (Germany) Julia Görges (quarterfinals)
2. (Russia) Daria Kasatkina (second round)
3. (Latvia) Anastasija Sevastova (quarterfinals, withdrew)
4. (Czech Republic) Kateřina Siniaková (first round)
5. (Belarus) Aliaksandra Sasnovich (semifinals)
6. (Romania) Irina-Camelia Begu (withdrew)
7. (France) Alizé Cornet (first round)
8. (Estonia) Kaia Kanepi (second round)

== Draw ==
Key

- Q = Qualifier
- WC = Wild card
- LL = Lucky loser
- Alt = Alternate
- ITF = ITF entry
- PR = Protected ranking
- SR = Special ranking
- SE = Special exempt
- JE = Junior exempt
- JR = Junior Accelerator Programme entrant
- CO = College Accelerator Programme entrant
- NG = Next Gen Accelerator Program entrant
- w/o = Walkover
- r = Retired
- d = Defaulted

=== Finals ===
Semifinals
LL	(Serbia) Olga Danilović	6	5	7
5	(Belarus) Aliaksandra Sasnovich	2	7	5
WC	(Russia) Anastasia Potapova	3	6	5
(Slovenia) Tamara Zidanšek	6	4	2^{r}

Final
LL	(Serbia) Olga Danilović	7	6^{1}	6
WC	(Russia) Anastasia Potapova	5	7^{7}	4

=== Top half ===
First round
1	(Germany) J Görges	6	6
(Slovakia) V Kužmová	1	0
(Russia) N Vikhlyantseva	6	6
Q	(Italy) D Chiesa	4	0
(Slovakia) AK Schmiedlová	2	4
LL	(Serbia) O Danilović	6	6
(Russia) V Zvonareva	2	2
8	(Estonia) K Kanepi	6	6
3	(Latvia) A Sevastova	6	3	6
(France) P Parmentier	2	6	4
(Russia) E Alexandrova	0	3
LL	(Romania) I Bara	6	6
Q	(Spain) P Badosa Gibert	1	2
(Russia) E Rodina	6	6
(Sweden) J Larsson	1	3
5	(Belarus) A Sasnovich	6	6

Second round
1	(Germany) J Görges	6	7^{7}
(Russia) N Vikhlyantseva	2	6^{2}
LL	(Serbia) O Danilović	7^{7}	7
8	(Estonia) K Kanepi	6^{3}	5
3	(Latvia) A Sevastova	6	6^{5}	6
LL	(Romania) I Bara	2	7^{7}	4
(Russia) E Rodina	5	2
5	(Belarus) A Sasnovich	7	6

Quarterfinals
1	(Germany) J Görges	3	3
LL	(Serbia) O Danilović	6	6
3	(Latvia) A Sevastova
5	(Belarus) A Sasnovich	w/o

Semifinals
LL	(Serbia) O Danilović	6	5	7
5	(Belarus) A Sasnovich	2	7	5

=== Bottom half ===
First round
Q	(Greece) V Grammatikopoulou	2	6	3
Q	(Russia) V Flink	6	3	6
Q	(Russia) V Ivakhnenko	6	7
(Montenegro) D Kovinić	2	5
(Bulgaria) V Tomova	1	1
WC	(Russia) A Potapova	6	6
(Czech Republic) Kr Plíšková	6	3	6
4	(Czech Republic) K Siniaková	4	6	4
7	(France) A Cornet	6	2	3
PR	(Germany) L Siegemund	4	6	6
Q	(Italy) M Trevisan	3	4
(Ukraine) K Kozlova	6	6
WC	(Germany) A Lottner	3	1
(Slovenia) T Zidanšek	6	6
(Russia) A Kalinskaya	1	1
2	(Russia) D Kasatkina	6	6

Second round
Q	(Russia) V Flink	6^{2}	3
Q	(Russia) V Ivakhnenko	7^{7}	6
WC	(Russia) A Potapova	6	6
(Czech Republic) Kr Plíšková	4	4
PR	(Germany) L Siegemund	6	6
(Ukraine) K Kozlova	0	3
(Slovenia) T Zidanšek	6	2	6
2	(Russia) D Kasatkina	4	6	4

Quarterfinals
Q	(Russia) V Ivakhnenko	6	3	2
WC	(Russia) A Potapova	1	6	6
PR	(Germany) L Siegemund	3	4
(Slovenia) T Zidanšek	6	6

Semifinals
WC	(Russia) A Potapova	3	6	5
(Slovenia) T Zidanšek	6	4	2^{r}

== Qualifying ==
=== Seeds ===
1. (Russia) Anna Kalinskaya (moved to main draw)
2. (Russia) Veronika Kudermetova (qualifying competition)
3. (Italy) Deborah Chiesa (qualified)
4. (Romania) Irina Bara (qualifying competition, lucky loser)
5. (Belgium) Maryna Zanevska (withdrew)
6. (Spain) Paula Badosa Gibert (qualified)
7. (Greece) Valentini Grammatikopoulou (qualified)
8. (Russia) Valentyna Ivakhnenko (qualified)
9. (Romania) Elena-Gabriela Ruse (first round)
10. (Italy) Martina Trevisan (qualified)
11. (Serbia) Dejana Radanović (first round)
12. (Serbia) Olga Danilović (qualifying competition, lucky loser)

=== Qualifiers ===
1. (Greece) Valentini Grammatikopoulou
2. (Russia) Valentyna Ivakhnenko
3. (Italy) Deborah Chiesa
4. (Russia) Varvara Flink
5. (Italy) Martina Trevisan
6. (Spain) Paula Badosa Gibert

=== Lucky losers ===
1. (Romania) Irina Bara
2. (Serbia) Olga Danilović

=== Draw ===
==== First qualifier ====
First round
Alt	(Russia) Anna Morgina	6	4	3
WC	(Russia) Anastasia Gasanova	3	6	6
(Italy) Jessica Pieri	2	4
7	(Greece) Valentini Grammatikopoulou	6	6

Qualifying competition
WC	(Russia) Anastasia Gasanova	4	3
7	(Greece) Valentini Grammatikopoulou	6	6

==== Second qualifier ====
First round
2	(Russia) Veronika Kudermetova	6	7^{7}
(Russia) Marina Melnikova	4	6^{2}
(Ukraine) Olga Ianchuk	6	0	2
8	(Russia) Valentyna Ivakhnenko	1	6	6

Qualifying competition
2	(Russia) Veronika Kudermetova	7^{7}	0	5
8	(Russia) Valentyna Ivakhnenko	6^{3}	6	7

==== Third qualifier ====
First round
3	(Italy) Deborah Chiesa	7	6
WC	(Russia) Ekaterina Yashina	5	2
WC	(Russia) Sofya Lansere	3	6	6
9	(Romania) Elena-Gabriela Ruse	6	3	3

Qualifying competition
3	(Italy) Deborah Chiesa	7^{7}	6
WC	(Russia) Sofya Lansere	6^{5}	0

==== Fourth qualifier ====
First round
4	(Romania) Irina Bara	6	6
WC	(Russia) Ekaterina Vishnevskaya	0	1
(Russia) Varvara Flink	6	4	6
11	(Serbia) Dejana Radanović	3	6	4

Qualifying competition
4	(Romania) Irina Bara	2	6	3
(Russia) Varvara Flink	6	2	6

==== Fifth qualifier ====
First round
Alt	(Japan) Rika Fujiwara	1	4
(Russia) Yana Sizikova	6	6
(Russia) Polina Monova	1	6	2
10	(Italy) Martina Trevisan	6	3	6

Qualifying competition
(Russia) Yana Sizikova	6	2	2
10	(Italy) Martina Trevisan	3	6	6

==== Sixth qualifier ====
First round
6	(Spain) Paula Badosa Gibert	7^{8}	2	7
(Kazakhstan) Elena Rybakina	6^{6}	6	5
(Germany) Vivian Heisen	4	4
12	(Serbia) Olga Danilović	6	6

Qualifying competition
6	(Spain) Paula Badosa Gibert	7^{7}	4	6
12	(Serbia) Olga Danilović	6^{4}	6	3
