= 2022 İstanbul Cup =

- Date: 19–24 April
- Edition: 15th
- Category: WTA 250
- Draw: 32S / 16D
- Prize money: $251,750
- Surface: Clay
- Location: Istanbul, Turkey
- Venue: Istanbul Tennis Center

Champions

Singles
- Anastasia Potapova

Doubles
- (Czech Republic) Marie Bouzková / (Spain) Sara Sorribes Tormo
- İstanbul Cup

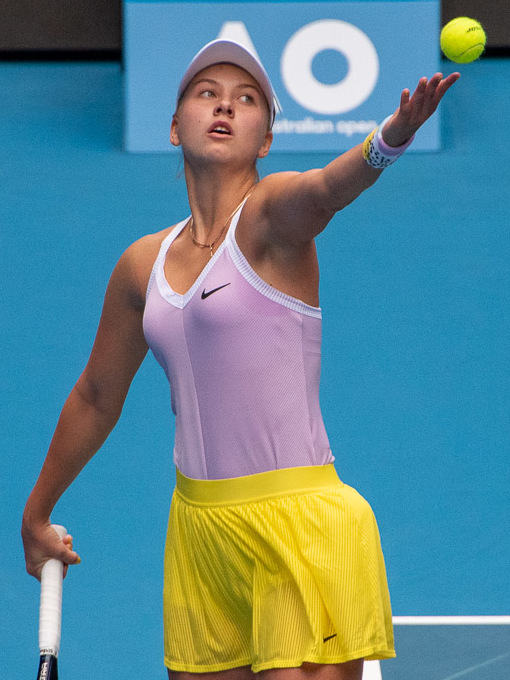
Potapova

The 2022 İstanbul Cup, also known as the TEB BNP Paribas Tennis Championship İstanbul for sponsorship reasons, was a women's tennis tournament played on outdoor clay courts. It was the 15th edition of the İstanbul Cup, and part of the WTA International tournaments of the 2022 WTA Tour. It took place in Istanbul, Turkey, from 19 through 24 April 2022. Unseeded Anastasia Potapova, who entered the main draw as a qualifier, won the singles title.

== Finals ==
=== Singles ===
- Anastasia Potapova defeated Veronika Kudermetova 6–3, 6–1

This is Potapova's first career WTA singles title.

=== Doubles ===
- (Czech Republic) Marie Bouzková / (Spain) Sara Sorribes Tormo defeated Natela Dzalamidze / Kamilla Rakhimova 6–3, 6–4

== Points and prize money ==
=== Points ===
Event	W	F	SF	QF	Round of 16	Round of 32	Q	Q2	Q1
Singles	280	180	110	60	30	1	18	12	1
Doubles	280	180	110	60	1	—N/a	—N/a	—N/a	—N/a

=== Prize money ===
Event	W	F	SF	QF	Round of 16	Round of 32	Q2	Q1
Singles	$29,200	$16,398	$10,100	$5,800	$3,675	$2,675	$1,950	$1,270
Doubles	$10,300	$6,000	$3,800	$2,300	$1,750	—N/a	—N/a	—N/a

== Singles main draw entrants ==
=== Seeds ===
Country	Player	Rank^{†}	Seed
BEL	Elise Mertens	23	1
ROU	Sorana Cîrstea	24	2
	Veronika Kudermetova	29	3
UKR	Anhelina Kalinina	36	4
SUI	Jil Teichmann	37	5
AUS	Ajla Tomljanović	42	6
ESP	Sara Sorribes Tormo	49	7
CZE	Tereza Martincová	50	8

^{†} Ranking are as of 11 April 2022.

=== Other entrants ===
The following players received wildcard entry into the singles main draw :

- (Czech Republic) Nikola Bartůňková
- (Turkey) İpek Öz
- (Turkey) Pemra Özgen

The following players received entry from the qualifying draw :

- (Romania) Ana Bogdan
- (Austria) Julia Grabher
- Marina Melnikova
- Anastasia Potapova
- (Ukraine) Lesia Tsurenko
- (China) Wang Qiang

The following player received entry as a lucky loser :

- (Australia) Jaimee Fourlis
- Kamilla Rakhimova

=== Withdrawals ===
Before the tournament

- (France) Caroline Garcia → replaced by (Slovakia) Anna Karolína Schmiedlová
- (Ukraine) Marta Kostyuk → replaced by (Netherlands) Arantxa Rus
- (Colombia) Camila Osorio → replaced by (Czech Republic) Marie Bouzková
- (China) Zheng Qinwen → replaced by (Hungary) Anna Bondár
- Aliaksandra Sasnovich → replaced by Kamilla Rakhimova
- (Czech Republic) Kateřina Siniaková → replaced by (Belgium) Greet Minnen
- (Denmark) Clara Tauson → replaced by (Sweden) Rebecca Peterson
- (Belgium) Alison Van Uytvanck → replaced by (Australia) Jaimee Fourlis

== Doubles main draw entrants ==
=== Seeds ===
Country	Player	Country	Player	Rank^{1}	Seed
	~~Veronika Kudermetova~~	~~BEL~~	~~Elise Mertens~~	~~7~~	~~1~~
~~USA~~	~~Caty McNally~~	~~BEL~~	~~Alison Van Uytvanck~~	~~85~~	~~2~~
CZE	Marie Bouzková	ESP	Sara Sorribes Tormo	100	3
USA	Kaitlyn Christian		Lidziya Marozava	132	4

- ^{1} Rankings as of 11 April 2022.

=== Other entrants ===
The following pairs received wildcard entry into the doubles main draw:

- (Turkey) Ayla Aksu / (Turkey) Zeynep Sönmez
- (Turkey) Berfu Cengiz / (Turkey) İpek Öz

The following pairs received entry as an alternates:

- Angelina Gabueva / Anastasia Zakharova
- Marina Melnikova / Anastasia Tikhonova

=== Withdrawals ===
Before the tournament

- (Belgium) Kirsten Flipkens / (Spain) Sara Sorribes Tormo → replaced by Anastasia Potapova / (Sweden) Rebecca Peterson
- Veronika Kudermetova / (Belgium) Elise Mertens → replaced by Angelina Gabueva / Anastasia Zakharova
- (United States) Caty McNally / Anna Kalinskaya → replaced by Marina Melnikova / Anastasia Tikhonova
