= 2022 Prague Open – Doubles =

Doubles
- 2022 Prague Open

Final
- Champions: Anastasia Potapova; Yana Sizikova
- Runners-up: Angelina Gabueva; Anastasia Zakharova
- Score: 6–3, 6–4

Details
- Draw: 16
- Seeds: 4

Events
Singles	Doubles
← 2021 ·	WTA Prague Open	· 2023 →

Anastasia Potapova and Yana Sizikova defeated Angelina Gabueva and Anastasia Zakharova in the final, 6–3, 6–4 to win the doubles tennis title at the 2022 Prague Open.

Marie Bouzková and Lucie Hradecká were the defending champions, but Bouzková did not participate. Hradecká partnered Andrea Sestini Hlaváčková in the latter's final professional tournament, but lost in the quarterfinals to Miyu Kato and Samantha Murray Sharan.

== Seeds ==
1. (Belgium) Kirsten Flipkens / (Belgium) Alison Van Uytvanck (withdrew)
2. (China) Han Xinyun / Alexandra Panova (first round)
3. (Japan) Miyu Kato / (United Kingdom) Samantha Murray Sharan (semifinals, withdrew)
4. Anastasia Potapova / Yana Sizikova (champions)

== Draw ==
=== Key ===
- Q = Qualifier
- WC = Wild card
- LL = Lucky loser
- Alt = Alternate
- SE = Special exempt
- PR = Protected ranking
- ITF = ITF entry
- JE = Junior exempt
- w/o = Walkover
- r = Retired
- d = Defaulted
- SR = Special ranking

=== Draw ===
First round
Alt	A Gabueva; A Zakharova	6	6
(France) E Lechemia (United States) S Santamaria	3	1
WC	(Czech Republic) L Havlíčková (Czech Republic) L Nosková	7	6
WC	(Czech Republic) B Palicová (Czech Republic) D Šalková	5	4
3	(Japan) M Kato (United Kingdom) S Murray Sharan	7	6
(United States) I Neel (Australia) A Sharma	5	4
PR	(Czech Republic) L Hradecká (Czech Republic) A Sestini Hlaváčková	5	6	[10]
(Czech Republic) A Dețiuc (Czech Republic) M Kolodziejová	7	2	[3]
PR	(Poland) M Linette (Belgium) Y Wickmayer	4	4
(Slovakia) V Kužmová (Romania) M Niculescu	6	6
(Georgia (country)) E Gorgodze (Bulgaria) V Tomova	3	6^{5}
4	A Potapova; Y Sizikova	6	7^{7}
(Thailand) P Plipuech (Indonesia) J Rompies	5	5
A Fomina-Klotz; E Yashina	7	7
V Diatchenko (Georgia (country)) O Kalashnikova	6	6
2	(China) X Han; A Panova	3	4

Quarterfinals
Alt	A Gabueva; A Zakharova	6	3	[10]
WC	(Czech Republic) L Havlíčková (Czech Republic) L Nosková	4	6	[8]
3	(Japan) M Kato (United Kingdom) S Murray Sharan	6	6
PR	(Czech Republic) L Hradecká (Czech Republic) A Sestini Hlaváčková	3	1
(Slovakia) V Kužmová (Romania) M Niculescu	6^{4}	6	[3]
4	A Potapova; Y Sizikova	7^{7}	3	[10]
A Fomina-Klotz; E Yashina	6	6
V Diatchenko (Georgia (country)) O Kalashnikova	4	4

Semifinals
Alt	A Gabueva; A Zakharova	w/o
3	(Japan) M Kato (United Kingdom) S Murray Sharan
4	A Potapova; Y Sizikova	7	6
A Fomina-Klotz; E Yashina	5	1

Final
Alt	A Gabueva; A Zakharova	3	4
4	A Potapova; Y Sizikova	6	6
