= 2019 Tashkent Open – Doubles =

Doubles
- 2019 Tashkent Open

Final
- Champions: (United States) Hayley Carter (Brazil) Luisa Stefani
- Runners-up: (Slovenia) Dalila Jakupović (United States) Sabrina Santamaria
- Score: 6–3, 7–6^{(7–4)}

Details
- Draw: 16
- Seeds: 4

Events
Singles	Doubles
← 2018 ·	Tashkent Open

Olga Danilović and Tamara Zidanšek were the defending champions, but chose not to participate this year.

Hayley Carter and Luisa Stefani won the title, defeating Dalila Jakupović and Sabrina Santamaria in the final, 6–3, 7–6^{(7–4)}.

== Seeds ==
1. (Russia) Anna Kalinskaya / (Slovakia) Viktória Kužmová (quarterfinals, withdrew)
2. (Romania) Irina-Camelia Begu / (Belarus) Lidziya Marozava (quarterfinals)
3. (Slovenia) Dalila Jakupović / (United States) Sabrina Santamaria (final)
4. (Sweden) Cornelia Lister / (Russia) Yana Sizikova (first round)

== Draw ==
=== Key ===
- Q = Qualifier
- WC = Wild card
- LL = Lucky loser
- Alt = Alternate
- SE = Special exempt
- PR = Protected ranking
- ITF = ITF entry
- JE = Junior exempt
- w/o = Walkover
- r = Retired
- d = Defaulted
- SR = Special ranking

=== Draw ===
First round
1	(Russia) A Kalinskaya (Slovakia) V Kužmová	7	6
(Russia) L Samsonova (Ukraine) K Zavatska	5	4
(United Kingdom) H Dart (Montenegro) D Kovinić	6	6
(United Kingdom) N Broady (Netherlands) R van der Hoek	2	3
4	(Sweden) C Lister (Russia) Y Sizikova	4	3
(Belarus) O Govortsova (Russia) V Savinykh	6	6
(United States) H Carter (Brazil) L Stefani	6	6
(Belgium) Y Bonaventure (Japan) M Kato	1	1
WC	(Russia) V Diatchenko (Uzbekistan) S Sharipova	7^{7}	6^{2}	[8]
(Belgium) G Minnen (Belgium) A Van Uytvanck	6^{5}	7^{7}	[10]
WC	(Uzbekistan) N Abduraimova (Uzbekistan) A Amanmuradova	3	0
3	(Slovenia) D Jakupović (United States) S Santamaria	6	6
PR	(Ukraine) K Bondarenko (Serbia) A Krunić	3	3
(Canada) S Fichman (Germany) T Maria	6	6
(United States) F Di Lorenzo (Poland) K Kawa	4	3
2	(Romania) I-C Begu (Belarus) L Marozava	6	6

Quarterfinals
1	(Russia) A Kalinskaya (Slovakia) V Kužmová
(United Kingdom) H Dart (Montenegro) D Kovinić	^{w/o}
(Belarus) O Govortsova (Russia) V Savinykh	3	2
(United States) H Carter (Brazil) L Stefani	6	6
(Belgium) G Minnen (Belgium) A Van Uytvanck	2^{r}
3	(Slovenia) D Jakupović (United States) S Santamaria	4
(Canada) S Fichman (Germany) T Maria	7	6
2	(Romania) I-C Begu (Belarus) L Marozava	5	4

Semifinals
(United Kingdom) H Dart (Montenegro) D Kovinić	1	3
(United States) H Carter (Brazil) L Stefani	6	6
3	(Slovenia) D Jakupović (United States) S Santamaria	6	6
(Canada) S Fichman (Germany) T Maria	2	3

Final
(United States) H Carter (Brazil) L Stefani	6	7^{7}
3	(Slovenia) D Jakupović (United States) S Santamaria	3	6^{4}
