= 2022 Prague Open – Singles =

Singles
- 2022 Prague Open

Final
- Champion: (Czech Republic) Marie Bouzková
- Runner-up: Anastasia Potapova
- Score: 6–0, 6–3

Details
- Draw: 32
- Seeds: 8

Events
Singles	Doubles
- WTA Prague Open

Marie Bouzková defeated Anastasia Potapova in the final, 6–0, 6–3 to win the singles tennis title at the 2022 Prague Open. It was her maiden WTA Tour title.

Barbora Krejčíková was the defending champion, but lost in the second round to Nao Hibino.

== Seeds ==
1. (Estonia) Anett Kontaveit (quarterfinals)
2. (Czech Republic) Barbora Krejčíková (second round)
3. (Belgium) Elise Mertens (first round)
4. (Romania) Sorana Cîrstea (first round)
5. (France) Alizé Cornet (second round)
6. (Belgium) Alison Van Uytvanck (first round, retired)
7. Anastasia Potapova (final)
8. (Czech Republic) Marie Bouzková (champion)

== Draw ==
Key

- Q = Qualifier
- WC = Wild card
- LL = Lucky loser
- Alt = Alternate
- ITF = ITF entry
- PR = Protected ranking
- SR = Special ranking
- SE = Special exempt
- JE = Junior exempt
- JR = Junior Accelerator Programme entrant
- CO = College Accelerator Programme entrant
- NG = Next Gen Accelerator Program entrant
- w/o = Walkover
- r = Retired
- d = Defaulted

=== Finals ===
Semifinals
7	Anastasia Potapova	6	6
Q	(China) Wang Qiang	3	0
8	(Czech Republic) Marie Bouzková	7^{7}	6
WC	(Czech Republic) Linda Nosková	6^{4}	3

Final
7	Anastasia Potapova	0	3
8	(Czech Republic) Marie Bouzková	6	6

=== Top half ===
First round
1/WC	(Estonia) A Kontaveit	6	6
(Georgia (country)) E Gorgodze	0	1
Q	(Czech Republic) B Palicová	2	6^{5}
WC	(Czech Republic) L Havlíčková	6	7^{7}
V Diatchenko	1	1
(China) L Zhu	6	6
(China) Xin Wang	1	2
7	A Potapova	6	6
3	(Belgium) E Mertens	3	6	2
(Poland) M Linette	6	2	6
(Ukraine) D Snigur	4	2
(Bulgaria) V Tomova	6	6
Q	(China) Q Wang	1	6	7^{7}
(Sweden) R Peterson	6	3	6^{4}
Q	(Slovenia) D Jakupović	5
6	(Belgium) A Van Uytvanck	2^{r}

Second round
1/WC	(Estonia) A Kontaveit	6	6
WC	(Czech Republic) L Havlíčková	4	3
(China) L Zhu	4	6^{8}
7	A Potapova	6	7^{10}
(Poland) M Linette	6	6
(Bulgaria) V Tomova	3	3
Q	(China) Q Wang	6	6
Q	(Slovenia) D Jakupović	3	1

Quarterfinals
1/WC	(Estonia) A Kontaveit	1	1
7	A Potapova	6	6
(Poland) M Linette	5	7^{7}	4
Q	(China) Q Wang	7	6^{5}	6

Semifinals
7	A Potapova	6	6
Q	(China) Q Wang	3	0

=== Bottom half ===
First round
8	(Czech Republic) M Bouzková	6	7^{7}
LL	(Austria) S Kraus	2	6^{2}
(Switzerland) Y In-Albon	1	4
Q	(Czech Republic) D Šalková	6	6
(Czech Republic) T Martincová	6	4	3
(France) C Paquet	2	6	6
Q	O Selekhmeteva	7	6
4	(Romania) S Cîrstea	5	4
5	(France) A Cornet	6	6
Q	A Zakharova	2	3
LL	N Vikhlyantseva	2	1^{r}
WC	(Czech Republic) L Nosková	6	3
(Romania) M Buzărnescu	2	2
LL	(Japan) N Hibino	6	6
A Blinkova	3	1
2	(Czech Republic) B Krejčíková	6	6

Second round
8	(Czech Republic) M Bouzková	6	6
Q	(Czech Republic) D Šalková	1	2
(France) C Paquet	4	6	3
Q	O Selekhmeteva	6	1	6
5	(France) A Cornet	5	6	6^{7}
WC	(Czech Republic) L Nosková	7	1	7^{9}
LL	(Japan) N Hibino	3	7^{7}	6
2	(Czech Republic) B Krejčíková	6	6^{5}	3

Quarterfinals
8	(Czech Republic) M Bouzková	6	6
Q	O Selekhmeteva	3	0
WC	(Czech Republic) L Nosková	6	4
LL	(Japan) N Hibino	3	2^{r}

Semifinals
8	(Czech Republic) M Bouzková	7^{7}	6
WC	(Czech Republic) L Nosková	6^{4}	3

== Qualifying ==
=== Seeds ===
1. (China) Yuan Yue (first round)
2. (China) Wang Qiang (qualified)
3. Anastasia Zakharova (qualified)
4. (Australia) Astra Sharma (first round)
5. Oksana Selekhmeteva (qualified)
6. (Slovakia) Viktória Kužmová (first round)
7. (Australia) Lizette Cabrera (first round)
8. (United Kingdom) Yuriko Miyazaki (first round)
9. (Austria) Sinja Kraus (qualifying competition, lucky loser)
10. (Israel) Lina Glushko (qualifying competition)
11. Natalia Vikhlyantseva (qualifying competition, lucky loser)
12. (Slovakia) Rebecca Šramková (first round)

=== Qualifiers ===
1. (Slovenia) Dalila Jakupović
2. (China) Wang Qiang
3. Anastasia Zakharova
4. (Czech Republic) Dominika Šalková
5. Oksana Selekhmeteva
6. (Czech Republic) Barbora Palicová

=== Lucky losers ===
1. (Austria) Sinja Kraus
2. Natalia Vikhlyantseva
3. (Japan) Nao Hibino

=== Qualifying draw ===
==== First qualifier ====
First round
1	(China) Yuan Yue	4	2
(Slovenia) Dalila Jakupović	6	6
WC	(Czech Republic) Miriam Kolodziejová	1	1
10	(Israel) Lina Glushko	6	6

Qualifying competition
(Slovenia) Dalila Jakupović	7	6
10	(Israel) Lina Glushko	5	3

==== Second qualifier ====
First round
2	(China) Wang Qiang	6	6
PR	(Australia) Kaylah McPhee	3	4
Valeria Savinykh	7	6
8	(United Kingdom) Yuriko Miyazaki	5	2

Qualifying competition
2	(China) Wang Qiang	6	6
Valeria Savinykh	3	2

==== Third qualifier ====
First round
3	Anastasia Zakharova	6	6
PR	(Germany) Antonia Lottner	3	2
(Czech Republic) Tereza Smitková	2	4
9	(Austria) Sinja Kraus	6	6

Qualifying competition
3	Anastasia Zakharova	6	6
9	(Austria) Sinja Kraus	2	2

==== Fourth qualifier ====
First round
4	(Australia) Astra Sharma	6	4	2
WC	(Czech Republic) Dominika Šalková	2	6	6
(Georgia (country)) Mariam Bolkvadze	4	6^{2}
11	Natalia Vikhlyantseva	6	7^{7}

Qualifying competition
WC	(Czech Republic) Dominika Šalková	6^{3}	7	6
11	Natalia Vikhlyantseva	7^{7}	5	2

==== Fifth qualifier ====
First round
5	Oksana Selekhmeteva	6	5	6
WC	(Czech Republic) Nikola Bartůňková	2	7	4
(Japan) Nao Hibino	7^{11}	6
12	(Slovakia) Rebecca Šramková	6^{9}	1

Qualifying competition
5	Oksana Selekhmeteva	6	2	6
(Japan) Nao Hibino	2	6	3

==== Sixth qualifier ====
First round
6	(Slovakia) Viktória Kužmová	5	2
WC	(Czech Republic) Barbora Palicová	7	6
PR	(Belgium) Yanina Wickmayer	6	6
7	(Australia) Lizette Cabrera	3	1

Qualifying competition
WC	(Czech Republic) Barbora Palicová	6	4	6
PR	(Belgium) Yanina Wickmayer	4	6	2
