= 2018 Moscow River Cup – Doubles =

Doubles
- 2018 Moscow River Cup

Final
- Champions: (Russia) Anastasia Potapova (Russia) Vera Zvonareva
- Runners-up: (Russia) Alexandra Panova (Kazakhstan) Galina Voskoboeva
- Score: 6–0, 6–3

Events
Singles	Doubles
Moscow River Cup

This was the first edition of the tournament. Anastasia Potapova and Vera Zvonareva won the title, defeating Alexandra Panova and Galina Voskoboeva in the final, 6–0, 6–3.

== Seeds ==
1. (Switzerland) Xenia Knoll / (Sweden) Johanna Larsson (semifinals)
2. (Russia) Veronika Kudermetova / (Belarus) Lidziya Marozava (first round)
3. (Australia) Monique Adamczak / (Australia) Jessica Moore (first round)
4. (Russia) Natela Dzalamidze / (Australia) Anastasia Rodionova (first round)

== Draw ==
=== Key ===
- Q = Qualifier
- WC = Wild card
- LL = Lucky loser
- Alt = Alternate
- SE = Special exempt
- PR = Protected ranking
- ITF = ITF entry
- JE = Junior exempt
- w/o = Walkover
- r = Retired
- d = Defaulted
- SR = Special ranking

=== Draw ===
First round
1	(Switzerland) X Knoll (Sweden) J Larsson	6	6
WC	(Russia) S Lansere (Kazakhstan) E Rybakina	2	3
(Montenegro) D Kovinić (Russia) Y Sizikova	6	7^{7}
(Russia) E Alexandrova (Russia) E Rodina	3	6^{5}
3	(Australia) M Adamczak (Australia) J Moore	6^{4}	2
(Russia) A Panova (Kazakhstan) G Voskoboeva	7^{7}	6
(Romania) I Bara (Georgia (country)) O Kalashnikova	6	1	[13]
WC	(Russia) P Monova (Belgium) M Zanevska	3	6	[11]
(Russia) A Komardina (United States) D Krawczyk	1	6	[7]
PR	(Germany) N Geuer (Germany) L Siegemund	6	2	[10]
(Russia) A Potapova (Russia) V Zvonareva	4	6	[10]
4	(Russia) N Dzalamidze (Australia) An Rodionova	6	3	[6]
(Russia) A Kalinskaya (Slovakia) V Kužmová	3	5
(Ukraine) K Kozlova (Russia) N Vikhlyantseva	6	7
(Japan) R Fujiwara (Croatia) D Jurak	6	7
2	(Russia) V Kudermetova (Belarus) L Marozava	4	5

Quarterfinals
1	(Switzerland) X Knoll (Sweden) J Larsson	6	6
(Montenegro) D Kovinić (Russia) Y Sizikova	3	1
(Russia) A Panova (Kazakhstan) G Voskoboeva	7	6
(Romania) I Bara (Georgia (country)) O Kalashnikova	5	2
PR	(Germany) N Geuer (Germany) L Siegemund	7^{8}	1	[8]
(Russia) A Potapova (Russia) V Zvonareva	6^{6}	6	[10]
(Ukraine) K Kozlova (Russia) N Vikhlyantseva	6	7
(Japan) R Fujiwara (Croatia) D Jurak	4	5

Semifinals
1	(Switzerland) X Knoll (Sweden) J Larsson	4	6	[9]
(Russia) A Panova (Kazakhstan) G Voskoboeva	6	2	[11]
(Russia) A Potapova (Russia) V Zvonareva	6	7^{7}
(Ukraine) K Kozlova (Russia) N Vikhlyantseva	3	6^{2}

Final
(Russia) A Panova (Kazakhstan) G Voskoboeva	0	3
(Russia) A Potapova (Russia) V Zvonareva	6	6
