= 2022 İstanbul Cup – Singles =

Singles
- 2022 İstanbul Cup

Final
- Champion: Anastasia Potapova
- Runner-up: Veronika Kudermetova
- Score: 6–3, 6–1

Details
- Draw: 32
- Seeds: 8

Events
Singles	Doubles
← 2021 ·	İstanbul Cup	· 2023 →

Anastasia Potapova defeated Veronika Kudermetova in the final, 6–3, 6–1 to win the singles title at the 2022 İstanbul Cup. It was her maiden WTA Tour title.

Sorana Cîrstea was the defending champion, but lost in the semifinals to Kudermetova.

== Seeds ==
1. (Belgium) Elise Mertens (first round, retired)
2. (Romania) Sorana Cîrstea (semifinals)
3. Veronika Kudermetova (final)
4. (Ukraine) Anhelina Kalinina (first round)
5. (Switzerland) Jil Teichmann (second round)
6. (Australia) Ajla Tomljanović (quarterfinals)
7. (Spain) Sara Sorribes Tormo (quarterfinals)
8. (Czech Republic) Tereza Martincová (first round)

== Draw ==
=== Key ===
- Q = Qualifier
- WC = Wild card
- LL = Lucky loser
- Alt = Alternate
- SE = Special exempt
- PR = Protected ranking
- ITF = ITF entry
- JE = Junior exempt
- w/o = Walkover
- r = Retired
- d = Defaulted
- SR = Special ranking

=== Finals ===
Semifinals
(Kazakhstan) Yulia Putintseva	6	2	2
Q	Anastasia Potapova	2	6	6
3	Veronika Kudermetova	6	6
2	(Romania) Sorana Cîrstea	3	3

Final
Q	Anastasia Potapova	6	6
3	Veronika Kudermetova	3	1

=== Top half ===
First round
1	(Belgium) E Mertens	5	1^{r}
(Sweden) R Peterson	7	4
(Poland) M Linette	6^{6}	4
(Kazakhstan) Y Putintseva	7^{8}	6
Q	(Ukraine) L Tsurenko	6	6
(Slovakia) AK Schmiedlová	0	2
LL	(Australia) J Fourlis	1	3
6	(Australia) A Tomljanović	6	6
4	(Ukraine) A Kalinina	6	5	6^{5}
(Croatia) P Martić	3	7	7^{7}
WC	(Czech Republic) N Bartůňková	1	4
Q	A Potapova	6	6
V Gracheva	6	7
(Czech Republic) M Bouzková	3	5
Q	(China) Q Wang	3	2
7	(Spain) S Sorribes Tormo	6	6

Second round
(Sweden) R Peterson	2	0
(Kazakhstan) Y Putintseva	6	6
Q	(Ukraine) L Tsurenko	4	0^{r}
6	(Australia) A Tomljanović	6	1
(Croatia) P Martić	2	3
Q	A Potapova	6	6
V Gracheva	2	1
7	(Spain) S Sorribes Tormo	6	6

Quarterfinals
(Kazakhstan) Y Putintseva	5	6	6
6	(Australia) A Tomljanović	7	2	4
Q	A Potapova	6	6
7	(Spain) S Sorribes Tormo	2	2

Semifinals
(Kazakhstan) Y Putintseva	6	2	2
Q	A Potapova	2	6	6

=== Bottom half ===
First round
8	(Czech Republic) T Martincová	4	5
(Hungary) A Bondár	6	7
(Spain) N Párrizas Díaz	7^{8}	7
(Italy) M Trevisan	6^{6}	5
(Croatia) A Konjuh	4	3
Q	(Romania) A Bogdan	6	6
Q	M Melnikova	2	0
3	V Kudermetova	6	6
5	(Switzerland) J Teichmann	6	6^{2}	6
(Belgium) G Minnen	3	7^{7}	3
Q	(Austria) J Grabher	7	6
WC	(Turkey) P Özgen	5	2
WC	(Turkey) İ Öz	3	1
(Netherlands) A Rus	6	6
LL	K Rakhimova	4	1
2	(Romania) S Cîrstea	6	6

Second round
(Hungary) A Bondár	6	6
(Spain) N Párrizas Díaz	4	2
Q	(Romania) A Bogdan
3	V Kudermetova	w/o
5	(Switzerland) J Teichmann	4	4
Q	(Austria) J Grabher	6	6
(Netherlands) A Rus	6	1	5
2	(Romania) S Cîrstea	3	6	7

Quarterfinals
(Hungary) A Bondár	6^{9}	6^{3}
3	V Kudermetova	7^{11}	7^{7}
Q	(Austria) J Grabher	5	1
2	(Romania) S Cîrstea	7	6

Semifinals
3	V Kudermetova	6	6
2	(Romania) S Cîrstea	3	3

== Qualifying ==
=== Seeds ===
1. (Slovakia) Anna Karolína Schmiedlová (moved to main draw)
2. (Romania) Ana Bogdan (qualified)
3. Kamilla Rakhimova (qualifying competition, lucky loser)
4. (China) Wang Qiang (qualified)
5. (Croatia) Donna Vekić (qualifying competition)
6. Anastasia Potapova (qualified)
7. (Ukraine) Lesia Tsurenko (qualified)
8. (China) Yuan Yue (first round)
9. (Georgia (country)) Mariam Bolkvadze (withdrew)
10. (Greece) Despina Papamichail (qualifying competition)
11. Anastasia Tikhonova (first round)
12. Marina Melnikova (qualified)

=== Qualifiers ===
1. (Ukraine) Lesia Tsurenko
2. (Romania) Ana Bogdan
3. (Austria) Julia Grabher
4. (China) Wang Qiang
5. Marina Melnikova
6. Anastasia Potapova

=== Lucky losers ===
1. Kamilla Rakhimova
2. (Australia) Jaimee Fourlis

=== Draw ===
==== First qualifier ====
First round
Alt	(Australia) Jaimee Fourlis	7	6
(Czech Republic) Jesika Malečková	5	3
(United States) Caty McNally	3	2
7	(Ukraine) Lesia Tsurenko	6	6

Qualifying competition
Alt	(Australia) Jaimee Fourlis	2	6	5
7	(Ukraine) Lesia Tsurenko	6	3	7

==== Second qualifier ====
First round
2	(Romania) Ana Bogdan	6	6
WC	(Turkey) Zeynep Sönmez	2	1
WC	(Turkey) Berfu Cengiz	6	6
8	(China) Yuan Yue	1	0

Qualifying competition
2	(Romania) Ana Bogdan	7	6
WC	(Turkey) Berfu Cengiz	5	3

==== Third qualifier ====
First round
3	Kamilla Rakhimova	6	6
WC	(France) Loïs Boisson	1	2
(Austria) Julia Grabher	6	6
11	Anastasia Tikhonova	3	3

Qualifying competition
3	Kamilla Rakhimova	3	1
(Austria) Julia Grabher	6	6

==== Fourth qualifier ====
First round
4	(China) Wang Qiang	6	6
WC	(Turkey) Ayla Aksu	0	2
(Belgium) Ysaline Bonaventure	4	6^{3}
10	(Greece) Despina Papamichail	6	7^{7}

Qualifying competition
4	(China) Wang Qiang	6	6
10	(Greece) Despina Papamichail	1	1

==== Fifth qualifier ====
First round
5	(Croatia) Donna Vekić	6	6
PR	(China) Han Xinyun	3	1
Anastasia Zakharova	5	4
12	Marina Melnikova	7	6

Qualifying competition
5	(Croatia) Donna Vekić	0	6^{5}
12	Marina Melnikova	6	7^{7}

==== Sixth qualifier ====
First round
6	Anastasia Potapova	6	6^{3}	6
(Bosnia and Herzegovina) Dea Herdželaš	1	7^{7}	2
(Spain) Andrea Lázaro García	6	6
Alt	(Serbia) Natalija Stevanović	3	2

Qualifying competition
6	Anastasia Potapova	6	6
(Spain) Andrea Lázaro García	2	4
