= 2019 Tashkent Open =

- Date: September 23–28
- Edition: 21st
- Category: WTA International
- Draw: 32S / 16D
- Prize money: $250,000
- Surface: Hard
- Location: Tashkent, Uzbekistan
- Venue: Olympic Tennis School

Champions

Singles
- (Belgium) Alison Van Uytvanck

Doubles
- (United States) Hayley Carter / (Brazil) Luisa Stefani
← 2018 ·	Tashkent Open

The 2019 Tashkent Open was a WTA International women's tennis tournament played on outdoor hard courts. It was the 21st and final edition of the Tashkent Open, on the 2019 WTA Tour. It took place at the Olympic Tennis School in Tashkent, Uzbekistan, between September 23 and September 28, 2019. Third-seeded Alison Van Uytvanck won the singles title.

== Finals ==
=== Singles ===
(Belgium) Alison Van Uytvanck defeated (Romania) Sorana Cîrstea, 6–2, 4–6, 6–4

- It was Van Uytvanck's 2nd and last singles title of the year and the 4th of her career.

=== Doubles ===
(United States) Hayley Carter / (Brazil) Luisa Stefani defeated (Slovenia) Dalila Jakupović / (United States) Sabrina Santamaria, 6–3, 7–6^{(7–4)}

== Points and prize money ==
=== Point distribution ===
Event	W	F	SF	QF	Round of 16	Round of 32	Q	Q2	Q1
Singles	280	180	110	60	30	1	18	12	1
Doubles	280	180	110	60	1	—	—	—	—

=== Prize money ===
Event	W	F	SF	QF	Round of 16	Round of 32^{1}	Q2	Q1
Singles	$43,000	$21,400	$11,500	$6,200	$3,420	$2,220	$1,285	$750
Doubles	$12,300	$6,400	$3,435	$1,820	$960	—	—	—
Doubles prize money per team

_{^{1} Qualifiers prize money is also the round of 32 prize money}

== Singles main-draw entrants ==
=== Seeds ===
Country	Player	Rank^{1}	Seed
SVK	Viktória Kužmová	53	1
RUS	Margarita Gasparyan	56	2
BEL	Alison Van Uytvanck	62	3
LAT	Jeļena Ostapenko	74	4
CZE	Kristýna Plíšková	81	5
GER	Tatjana Maria	86	6
HUN	Tímea Babos	92	7
ROU	Sorana Cîrstea	95	8

- ^{1} Rankings as of September 16, 2019

=== Other entrants ===
The following players received wildcards into the singles main draw:

- (Uzbekistan) Nigina Abduraimova
- (Uzbekistan) Akgul Amanmuradova
- (Uzbekistan) Sabina Sharipova

The following players received entry using protected rankings:

- (Czech Republic) Denisa Allertová
- (Ukraine) Kateryna Bondarenko

The following players received entry from the qualifying draw:

- (United Kingdom) Harriet Dart
- (Belarus) Olga Govortsova
- (Czech Republic) Tereza Martincová
- (Russia) Liudmila Samsonova

=== Withdrawals ===
Before the tournament

- (Switzerland) Timea Bacsinszky → replaced by (Hungary) Tímea Babos
- (Germany) Mona Barthel → replaced by (Russia) Anna Kalinskaya
- (Serbia) Ivana Jorović → replaced by (Poland) Katarzyna Kawa
- (Slovakia) Anna Karolína Schmiedlová → replaced by (Belgium) Greet Minnen

=== Retirements ===
- (Latvia) Jeļena Ostapenko (gastrointestinal illness)

== Doubles main-draw entrants ==
=== Seeds ===
Country	Player	Country	Player	Rank^{1}	Seed
RUS	Anna Kalinskaya	SVK	Viktória Kužmová	106	1
ROU	Irina-Camelia Begu	BLR	Lidziya Marozava	127	2
SLO	Dalila Jakupović	USA	Sabrina Santamaria	158	3
SWE	Cornelia Lister	RUS	Yana Sizikova	177	4

- ^{1} Rankings as of September 16, 2019

=== Other entrants ===
The following pairs received wildcards into the doubles main draw:

- (Uzbekistan) Nigina Abduraimova / (Uzbekistan) Akgul Amanmuradova
- (Russia) Vitalia Diatchenko / (Uzbekistan) Sabina Sharipova

=== Withdrawals ===
During the tournament

- (Russia) Anna Kalinskaya (gastrointestinal illness)

=== Retirements ===
- (Belgium) Greet Minnen (back injury)
