= Moscow River Cup =

Defunct tennis tournament
- Event name: Moscow River Cup
- Tour: WTA International
- Founded: 2018
- Abolished: 2018
- Location: Moscow, Russia
- Surface: Clay (red) - outdoors

The Moscow River Cup was a WTA Tour International-level professional women's tennis tournament. It took place on outdoor clay courts, in July 2018, at the National Tennis Center of Juan Antonio Samaranch, in Moscow. The tournament was replaced by Baltic Open.

The prize money was $750,000, a significantly higher amount than the usual norm at WTA International-level events.

== Results ==
=== Singles ===
Year	Champion	Runner-up	Score
2018	(Serbia) Olga Danilović	(Russia) Anastasia Potapova	7–5, 6–7^{(1–6)}, 6–4

=== Doubles ===
Year	Champions	Runners-up	Score
2018	(Russia) Anastasia Potapova (Russia) Vera Zvonareva	(Russia) Alexandra Panova (Kazakhstan) Galina Voskoboeva	6–0, 6–3
