= 2018 Tashkent Open – Singles =

Singles
- 2018 Tashkent Open

Final
- Champion: (Russia) Margarita Gasparyan
- Runner-up: (Russia) Anastasia Potapova
- Score: 6–2, 6–1

Details
- Draw: 32
- Seeds: 8

Events
Singles	Doubles
- Tashkent Open

Kateryna Bondarenko was the defending champion, but chose not to participate.

Margarita Gasparyan won the title, defeating qualifier and compatriot Anastasia Potapova in the final 6–2, 6–1. Ranked at World No. 299, Gasparyan became the third-lowest ranked player ever to win a WTA singles title.

== Seeds ==
1. (Romania) Irina-Camelia Begu (first round)
2. (Belarus) Vera Lapko (quarterfinals)
3. (Slovenia) Tamara Zidanšek (first round)
4. (Switzerland) Stefanie Vögele (first round)
5. (Germany) Tatjana Maria (second round)
6. (Slovakia) Anna Karolína Schmiedlová (quarterfinals)
7. (Russia) Evgeniya Rodina (second round)
8. (Slovenia) Dalila Jakupović (quarterfinals)

== Draw ==
Key

- Q = Qualifier
- WC = Wild card
- LL = Lucky loser
- Alt = Alternate
- ITF = ITF entry
- PR = Protected ranking
- SR = Special ranking
- SE = Special exempt
- JE = Junior exempt
- JR = Junior Accelerator Programme entrant
- CO = College Accelerator Programme entrant
- NG = Next Gen Accelerator Program entrant
- w/o = Walkover
- r = Retired
- d = Defaulted

=== Finals ===
Semifinals
(Ukraine) Kateryna Kozlova	2	3
Q	(Russia) Anastasia Potapova	6	6
PR	(Russia) Margarita Gasparyan	4	6	7
(Germany) Mona Barthel	6	1	5

Final
Q	(Russia) Anastasia Potapova	2	1
PR	(Russia) Margarita Gasparyan	6	6

=== Top half ===
First round
1	(Romania) I-C Begu	3	2
(Ukraine) K Kozlova	6	6
(France) F Ferro	1	7^{7}	6
(Croatia) J Fett	6	6^{4}	1
(Japan) N Hibino	6	6
(Canada) E Bouchard	3	3
Q	(Serbia) D Radanović	3	0
6	(Slovakia) AK Schmiedlová	6	6
4	(Switzerland) S Vögele	6	6^{3}	3
Q	(Russia) A Potapova	4	7^{7}	6
(Serbia) O Danilović	6	6
WC	(Russia) A Kalinskaya	4	1
(Ukraine) M Kostyuk	4	3
(Netherlands) A Rus	6	6
(Russia) A Blinkova	4	7	4
8	(Slovenia) D Jakupović	6	5	6

Second round
(Ukraine) K Kozlova	7	6
(France) F Ferro	5	4
(Japan) N Hibino	6^{5}	4
6	(Slovakia) AK Schmiedlová	7^{7}	6
Q	(Russia) A Potapova	6	6
(Serbia) O Danilović	3	3
(Netherlands) A Rus	1	6^{6}
8	(Slovenia) D Jakupović	6	7^{8}

Quarterfinals
(Ukraine) K Kozlova	6	6
6	(Slovakia) AK Schmiedlová	3	2
Q	(Russia) A Potapova	7	2	6
8	(Slovenia) D Jakupović	5	6	1

Semifinals
(Ukraine) K Kozlova	2	3
Q	(Russia) A Potapova	6	6

=== Bottom half ===
First round
5	(Germany) T Maria	6	6
(Russia) N Vikhlyantseva	1	2
(Uzbekistan) S Sharipova	2	2
PR	(Russia) M Gasparyan	6	6
Q	(Hungary) F Stollár	3	6	6
(Japan) K Nara	6	3	4
WC	(Russia) V Zvonareva	6	6
3	(Slovenia) T Zidanšek	1	4
7	(Russia) E Rodina	7	6
(Poland) M Fręch	5	2
(Germany) M Barthel	4	6	6
WC	(Uzbekistan) N Abduraimova	6	3	3
(Russia) E Alexandrova	3	2
Q	(Serbia) I Jorović	6	6
PR	(Serbia) B Jovanovski Petrović	1	3
2	(Belarus) V Lapko	6	6

Second round
5	(Germany) T Maria	2	6	6^{2}
PR	(Russia) M Gasparyan	6	3	7^{7}
Q	(Hungary) F Stollár	7^{7}	6
WC	(Russia) V Zvonareva	6^{2}	4
7	(Russia) E Rodina	5	6	4
(Germany) M Barthel	7	4	6
Q	(Serbia) I Jorović	2	4
2	(Belarus) V Lapko	6	6

Quarterfinals
PR	(Russia) M Gasparyan	3	6	6
Q	(Hungary) F Stollár	6	2	1
(Germany) M Barthel	6	7
2	(Belarus) V Lapko	3	5

Semifinals
PR	(Russia) M Gasparyan	4	6	7
(Germany) M Barthel	6	1	5

== Qualifying ==
=== Seeds ===
1. (Russia) Anastasia Potapova (qualified)
2. (Switzerland) Conny Perrin (first round)
3. (Hungary) Fanny Stollár (qualified)
4. (Bulgaria) Viktoriya Tomova (first round)
5. (Japan) Misaki Doi (qualifying competition)
6. (United Kingdom) Harriet Dart (first round)
7. (Kazakhstan) Elena Rybakina (first round)
8. (Netherlands) Bibiane Schoofs (qualifying competition)

=== Qualifiers ===
1. (Russia) Anastasia Potapova
2. (Serbia) Ivana Jorović
3. (Hungary) Fanny Stollár
4. (Serbia) Dejana Radanović

=== Qualifying draw ===
==== First qualifier ====
First round
1	(Russia) Anastasia Potapova	6	6
WC	(Uzbekistan) Yasmina Karimjanova	3	1
(France) Amandine Hesse	3	2
5	(Japan) Misaki Doi	6	6

Qualifying competition
1	(Russia) Anastasia Potapova	6^{5}	6	6
5	(Japan) Misaki Doi	7^{7}	3	2

==== Second qualifier ====
First round
2	(Switzerland) Conny Perrin	6	6^{4}	4
(Serbia) Ivana Jorović	1	7^{7}	6
WC	(Uzbekistan) Akgul Amanmuradova	5	3
8	(Netherlands) Bibiane Schoofs	7	6

Qualifying competition
(Serbia) Ivana Jorović	7^{7}	6
8	(Netherlands) Bibiane Schoofs	6^{1}	3

==== Third qualifier ====
First round
3	(Hungary) Fanny Stollár	6	3	6
(Czech Republic) Barbora Štefková	4	6	1
(Russia) Varvara Flink	6	3	6
7	(Kazakhstan) Elena Rybakina	4	6	3

Qualifying competition
3	(Hungary) Fanny Stollár	7^{7}	6
(Russia) Varvara Flink	6^{4}	3

==== Fourth qualifier ====
First round
4	(Bulgaria) Viktoriya Tomova	2	4
(Serbia) Dejana Radanović	6	6
(Russia) Alexandra Panova	4	6	6
6	(United Kingdom) Harriet Dart	6	1	1

Qualifying competition
(Serbia) Dejana Radanović	7	7
(Russia) Alexandra Panova	5	5
