= Anastasia Potapova =

Russian-born Austrian tennis player (born 2001)

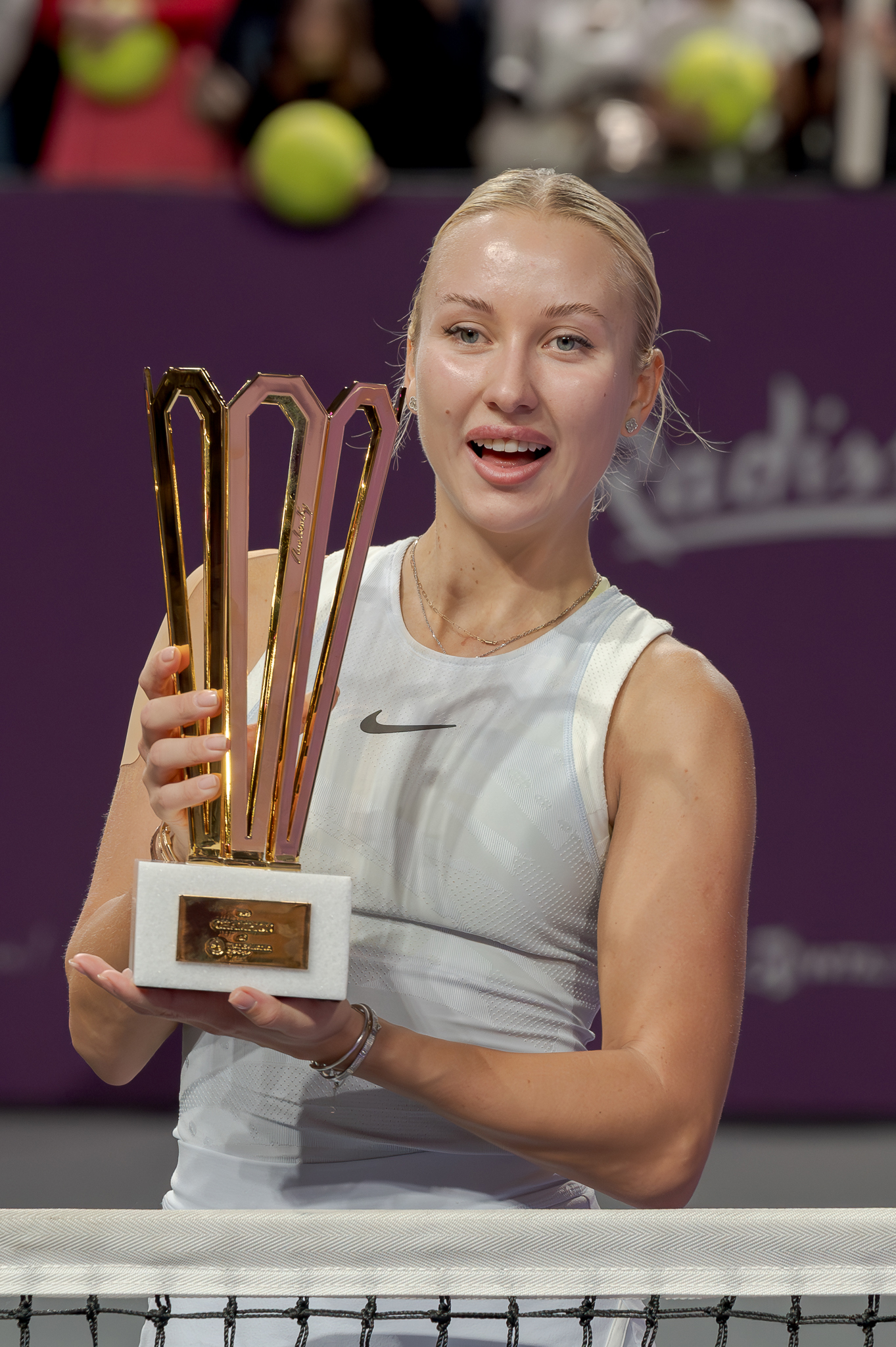
- Potapova at the 2025 Transylvania Open
- Full name: Anastasia Sergeyevna Potapova
- Native name: Анастасия Потапова
- Country (sports): Austria (since 2025); Russia (2014–2025)
- Residence: Vienna, Austria
- Born: 30 March 2001 (age 25) Saratov, Russia
- Height: 1.75 m (5 ft 9 in)
- Plays: Right-handed (two-handed backhand)
- Coach: Henner Nehles (since 2025)
- Prize money: US$ 7,208,202

Singles
- Career record: 269–191
- Career titles: 3
- Highest ranking: No. 21 (19 June 2023)
- Current ranking: No. 25 (28 September 2026)

Grand Slam singles results
- Australian Open: 3R (2021, 2026)
- French Open: 4R (2024, 2026)
- Wimbledon: 3R (2023)
- US Open: 4R (2026)

Doubles
- Career record: 95–89
- Career titles: 3
- Highest ranking: No. 40 (5 December 2022)
- Current ranking: No. 445 (28 September 2026)

Grand Slam doubles results
- Australian Open: QF (2022)
- French Open: QF (2025)
- Wimbledon: 1R (2019, 2021, 2024, 2026)
- US Open: 2R (2022, 2023)

Team competitions
- Fed Cup: 3–1
- Last updated on: 29 September 2026.

Anastasia Sergeyevna Potapova (Note: Russian: Анастасия Сергеевна Потапова, IPA: [ɐnəstɐˈsʲijə pɐˈtapəvə].) (born 30 March 2001) is a Russian-born Austrian professional tennis player. She has a career-high singles ranking of No. 21 by the WTA, achieved on 19 June 2023, and a doubles ranking of No. 40, reached on 5 December 2022. Potapova has won three WTA Tour singles titles along with three doubles titles. She is a former junior world No. 1, and she was the 2016 Wimbledon girls' singles champion.

== Career overview ==
=== Juniors ===
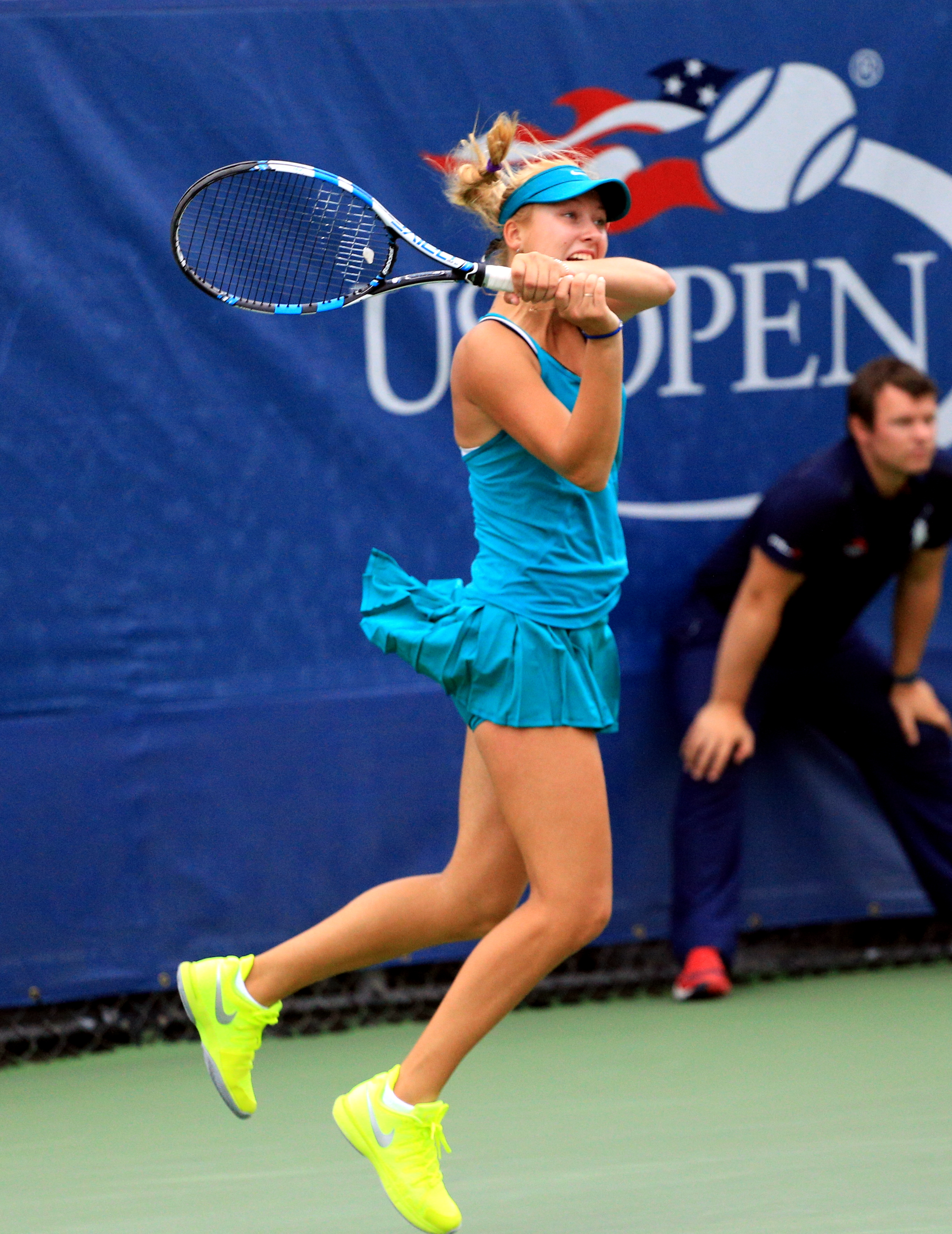
Potapova at the 2015 US Open junior event

On the junior tour, Potapova had a career-high junior ranking of 1, achieved in July 2016. Potapova had great success on the junior tour, including a semifinal at the 2016 French Open, quarterfinals at the 2016 Australian Open and the 2015 Wimbledon Championships and doubles finals at the 2015 US Open and the 2016 French Open. Potapova won the 2016 Wimbledon Championships girls' title, defeating Dayana Yastremska in the final. Two of the seven match points in the final set were overturned by challenges. That title made her the number-one junior in the world.

Potapova's other junior highlights included semifinal appearances at the Trofeo Bonfiglio and the Orange Bowl championships, both Grade-A events. Her biggest junior title, excluding Wimbledon, was the Nike Junior International in Roehampton, a Grade-1 event, in which she defeated other highly rated junior players such as Claire Liu, Jaimee Fourlis, Sofia Kenin, Olga Danilović and Olesya Pervushina en route to winning the title.

=== 2017: Early rise ===
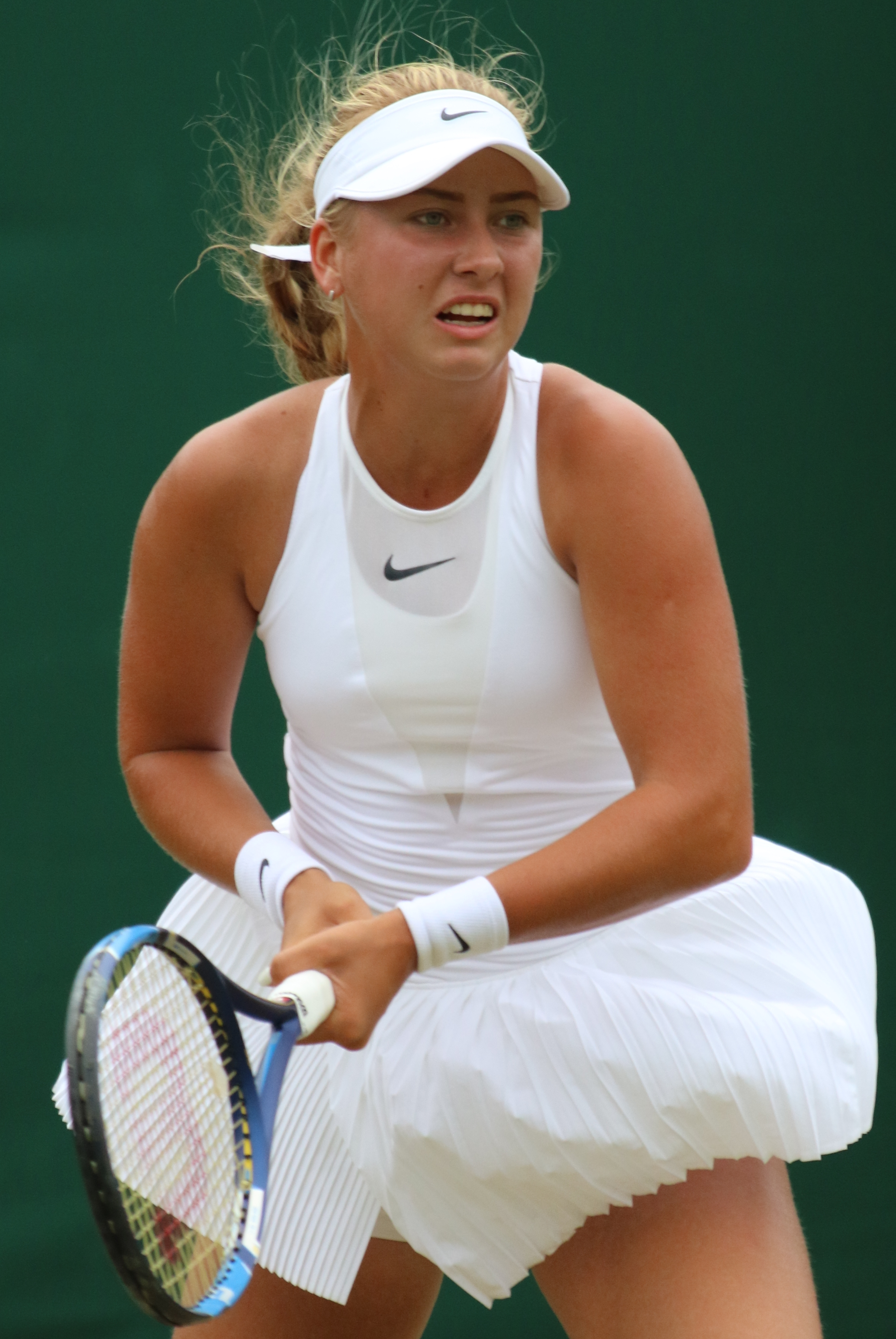
Potapova at the 2017 Wimbledon Championships

Starting her first full year on the tour, Potapova started 2017 unranked as she had only played two professional events entering the year. She defeated rival Amanda Anisimova in the final at an $25k event held in Curitiba. This triumph saw her defeat Teliana Pereira for her first top-200 win, and pushed her into the top 500 of the rankings for the first time in her career.

She then made her WTA Tour debut, after having received a wildcard to compete in the qualifying rounds of the Premier Mandatory event in Miami, defeating Maria Sakkari for her first top-100 win, before falling to Jana Čepelová in straight sets. A series of good runs on clay saw her reaching two ITF semifinals in succession, most particularly at the Empire Slovak Open where she was just an inch away from reaching the final, losing 5–7 in the final set against Verónica Cepede Royg, who went on to reach the second week at the French Open.

Potapova was handed another wildcard, this time into the qualifying draw of Wimbledon. She pounced on her chances, steering through all her matches in straight sets to make her major main-draw debut defeating Elizaveta Kulichkova in the last round. However, an untimely fall during her first-round match saw her being forced to retire against Tatjana Maria, ending her impressive run.

It was a bleak stretch of results which followed for Potapova, who reached just one ITF Circuit quarterfinal through the remainder of the year. She ended the year ranked 242, with a 20–14 win–loss record and eight top-200 wins.

=== 2018: First singles final & doubles title on WTA Tour ===
Potapova started 2018 with a final appearance at the Sharm El Sheikh $15k event, but was upset by world No. 769, Yuliya Hatouka. She then played in her second WTA Tour main-draw match at the St. Petersburg Trophy where she finally earned her first main-draw win against Tatjana Maria, in straight sets. This set up a blockbuster second-round match between newly crowned Australian Open champion and world No. 1, Wozniacki, and Potapova, a clash between experience and youth. However, Potapova was only able to claim one game against Wozniacki, falling 0–6, 1–6 to end her run.

Potapova made her Fed Cup debut for Russia, but lost to the higher-ranked Viktória Kužmová and was unable to lead her country to the victory on that weekend. Another ITF final awaited Potapova, this time coming at the O1 Properties Ladies Cup held in Russia. She ousted the 64th-ranked Monica Niculescu but was unable to close out her run as she was defeated by second seed Vera Lapko.

Reaching her first professional clay-court final in Rome, she lost to Dayana Yastremska there having just won one game in the chamionship match.

Potapova was given the chance to participate in yet another tour event, and entered the Moscow River Cup with the help of a wildcard. She defeated two top-100 players and came out of nowhere to make her maiden WTA final, but faltered at the last hurdle as she fell to fellow 17-year-old lucky loser Olga Danilović in a historic clash between two new generation players. She led by a break in the deciding set, but failed to close out the win but still managed to make her top-150 debut with this amazing run. This was the first WTA tournament final between two players under 18 since Tatiana Golovin and Nicole Vaidišová played in the final of the 2005 Japan Open. At the same tournament, she won her maiden WTA Tour title in doubles with Vera Zvonareva.

Potapova lost in the final round of qualifying at the US Open to Julia Glushko but rebounded to qualify for her third tour main-draw appearance at the Tashkent Open. She defeated Stefanie Vögele and exacted revenge for her Moscow loss against Olga Danilović in the second round. She then trounced Kateryna Kozlova in the semifinals to set up an all-Russian final with Margarita Gasparyan, where she was defeated with a one-sided scoreline.

Her season ended with a tough, but encouraging loss to eventual semifinalist and eighth seed Anett Kontaveit in the opening round of the Kremlin Cup despite leading by a break in the final set. Nonetheless, she ended the year inside the top 100 for the first time in her career with a dominating 6–2 win–loss record against top-100 players.

=== 2019: First major event match win ===
Potapova received entry to the main draw of the Australian Open and played her first match against Pauline Parmentier, defeating her in straight sets. This was Potapova's first match win in the main draw of a Grand Slam tournament. In the second round, she was defeated by 17th seed Madison Keys.

She then backed it up with a strong semifinal finish at the Hungarian Ladies Open, beating Sorana Cîrstea in a final-set tiebreak. At the same tournament, she also reached the doubles semifinal alongside Anna Blinkova, but lost to compatriots Ekaterina Alexandrova/Vera Zvonareva in three sets.

After losses in the first qualifying round at the Indian Wells Open and the Miami Open, Potapova returned to help book Russian team's spot in the World Group 2 with a vital comeback win over Martina Trevisan. She also partnered Vlada Koval to win the dead doubles rubber.

The Russian earned her first top-20 win over Anastasija Sevastova at the Prague Open and went on to stun world No. 5, Angelique Kerber, in the first round of the French Open.

Potapova won her second career WTA Tour doubles title at the Ladies Open Lausanne with Yana Sizikova and proceeded to reach the semifinals of the Baltic Open where she lost to Sevastova in straight sets.

She lost in the first round of the US Open to Coco Gauff in three sets, before making the second round at the Korea Open where she injured her ankle against Magda Linette.

Potapova ended her season with a first-round loss at the Kremlin Cup to good friend Anna Kalinskaya.

=== 2020: Achieving consistency, surgery ===
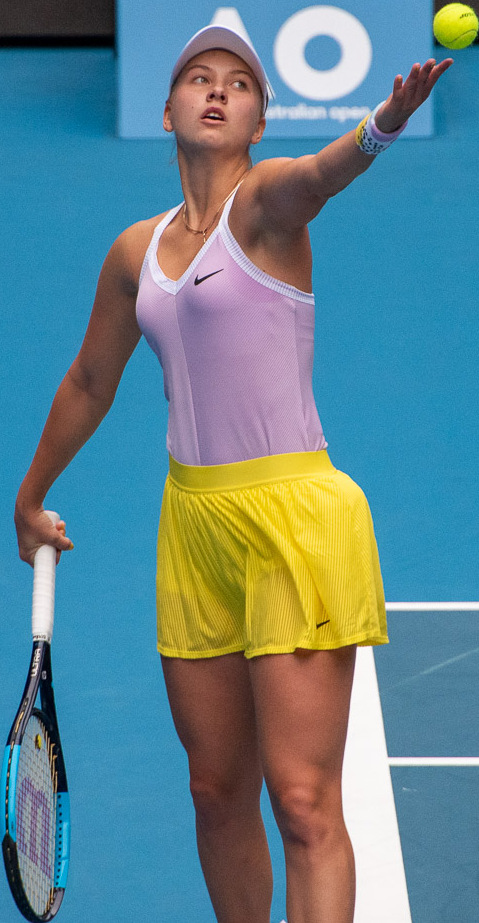
Potapova serving at the 2020 Australian Open

Potapova started the new season at the Brisbane International where she lost in the final round of qualifying to Yulia Putintseva. Competing at the first edition of the Adelaide International, she was defeated in the final round of qualifying by Arina Rodionova. At the Australian Open, she was defeated in the first round by eighth seed and seven-time champion, Serena Williams.

Coming through qualifying at the St. Petersburg Ladies' Trophy, Potapova reached the quarterfinals where she lost to second seed, defending champion, and eventual champion, Kiki Bertens. At the Abierto Mexicano, she was defeated in the quarterfinals by qualifier and eventual finalist, Leylah Fernandez. In Monterrey, she made it to the quarterfinals by wins over qualifier Giulia Gatto-Monticone and Tamara Zidanšek. Despite having two match points in the third set, she ended up losing to second seed Johanna Konta.

Potapova didn't play any more tournaments for the rest of the year due to undergoing ankle surgery for her injury sustained at the Korea Open a year earlier. She ended her season ranked 100.

=== 2021: Major third round, WTA 1000 quarterfinal ===
Beginning her 2021 season at the first edition of the Abu Dhabi Open, Potapova lost in the first round to ninth seed Maria Sakkari. At the first edition of the Gippsland Trophy, she was defeated in the second round by top seed Simona Halep.

At the Australian Open, she beat 24th seed Alison Riske in the first round. She lost in the third round to tenth seed Serena Williams, despite holding multiple set points. After the Australian Open, she competed at the first edition of the Phillip Island Trophy where she was defeated in the first round by 16th seed Rebecca Peterson. However, in doubles, she and Anna Blinkova reached the final where they lost to Ankita Raina and Kamilla Rakhimova. In Doha, Potapova lost in the second round of qualifying to Jessica Pegula.

At the Dubai Championships, she beat 11th seed Madison Keys and sixth seed and 2019 champion, Belinda Bencic to reach the quarterfinals of a WTA1000 tournament for the first time in her career. She ended up losing to eventual finalist Barbora Krejčíková. At the Miami Open, she was defeated in the first round by Ajla Tomljanović.

Potapova's first clay-court tournament of the season was at the Charleston Open where she lost in the first round to Anastasija Sevastova. At the İstanbul Cup, she upset sixth seed and compatriot, Anastasia Pavlyuchenkova in a three-set first-round battle. She was defeated in the second round by eventual champion Sorana Cîrstea. In Madrid, she lost in the final round of qualifying to Kristina Mladenovic. At the Italian Open, she was defeated in the final round of qualifying by Bernarda Pera. At the French Open, she lost her first-round match to Leylah Fernandez.

The Russian saved match points against Nina Stojanović in the first round of the Birmingham Classic and reached her second WTA quarterfinal of the year with a comfortable win over Mladenovic. However, she lost to eventual champion Ons Jabeur in straight sets. Potapova was then defeated in the first round of Wimbledon by Donna Vekić.

Potapova qualified for the main draw at the Canadian Open with another win over Mladenovic and stunned Shelby Rogers in the first round. However, she was forced to retire in the second round due to injury. She crashed out of the US Open in the first round against 23rd seed Jessica Pegula in straight sets.

At the Ostrava Open, Potapova qualified for the main draw and beat former top-5 player Caroline Garcia, in the first round. She then lost to second seed Petra Kvitová, in three sets. She made her third quarterfinal of the year at the Astana Open, and defeated Mladenovic for the third time this year.

Her season ended with first-round losses at the Kremlin Cup against Simona Halep and the Transylvania Open against Tomljanović once again.

=== 2022: First career singles title ===
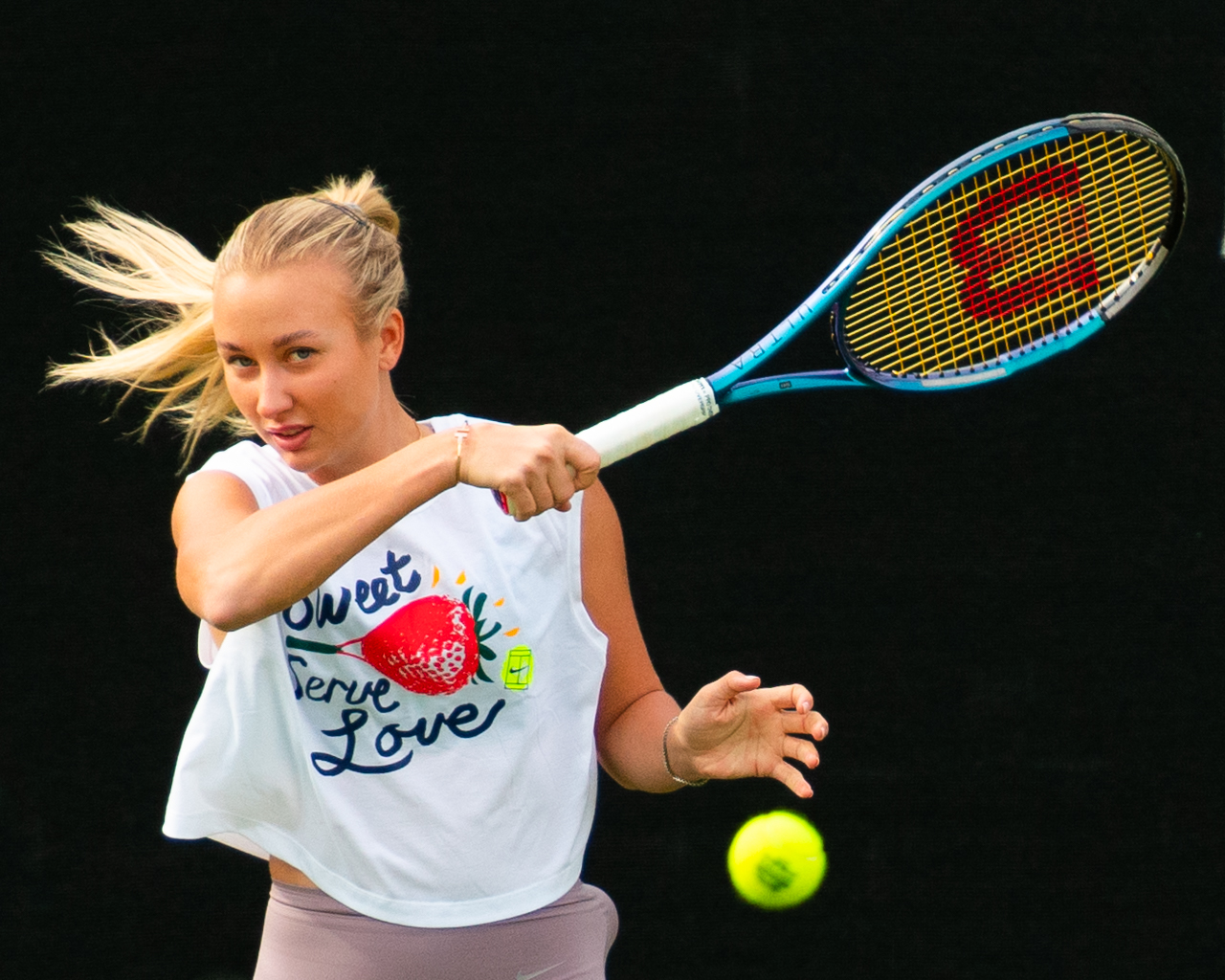
Potapova in June 2023

Potapova started her season brightly at the Melbourne Summer Set 1 when she reached the quarterfinals but lost to compatriot Veronika Kudermetova, in three sets. She was also defeated in the first round of the Australian Open, by 30th seed Camila Giorgi. However, she made her first major quarterfinal in doubles, alongside Rebecca Peterson, although they lost to eventual finalists Beatriz Haddad Maia and Anna Danilina, after leading by a set and a break.

She suffered first-round exits at the St. Petersburg Trophy, Monterrey Open and the Indian Wells Open, and failure to defend her points from Dubai in 2021 meant that she fell out of the top 100. Nonetheless, she made the doubles semifinals in St. Petersburg with Vera Zvonareva.

Ranked No. 122 at the İstanbul Cup, she won her first WTA Tour title as a qualifier defeating third seed and world No. 29, Veronika Kudermetova. As a result, she returned to the top 80 in the rankings, at world No. 78 on 25 April 2022.

In June, she was kept from playing at Wimbledon due to the Russian and Belarusian players ban resulting from the Russian invasion of Ukraine.

In July, Potapova made it to the semifinals of the Lausanne Open where she lost in straight sets to Olga Danilović. She also reached the semifinals of the Hamburg European Open, losing in straight sets to world No. 2 Anett Kontaveit.

Following her showing in the Prague Open final where she lost to Marie Bouzková, she reached the top 50 at world No. 48, on 1 August 2022. At the same tournament, she won her third doubles title with Yana Sizikova defeating compatriots Angelina Gabueva and Anastasia Zakharova. She reached a career-high ranking of No. 52 in doubles also on 1 August 2022.

=== 2023: Second career title, football shirt warning ===
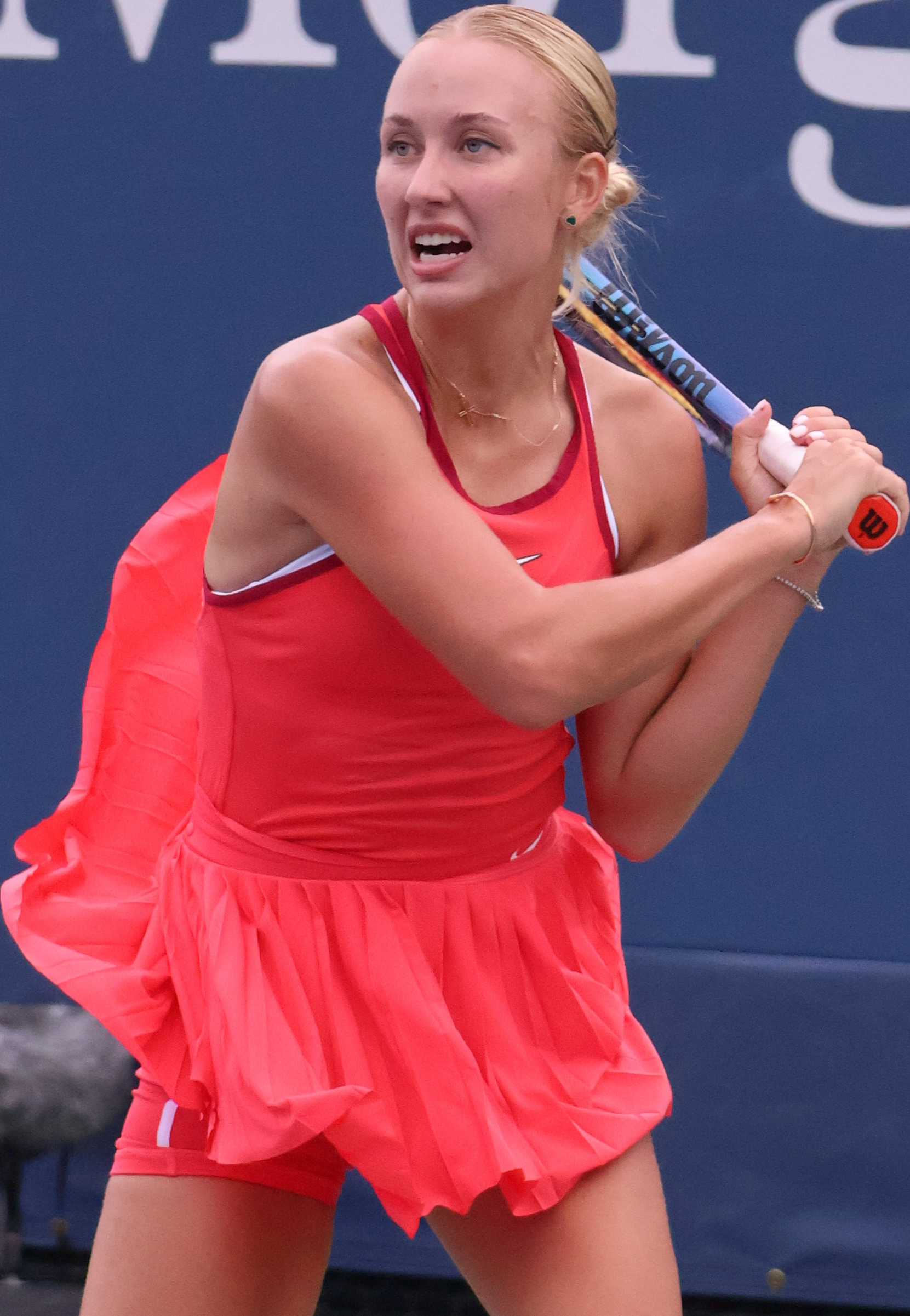
Potapova at the 2023 US Open

Potapova won her second WTA title at the Linz Open in February, defeating sixth seed Petra Martić in the final, having got past Lucia Bronzetti, Jule Niemeier, Anna-Lena Friedsam and Markéta Vondroušová on her way to the championship match.

In March, the WTA issued a formal warning to Potapova for wearing a T-shirt of Russian soccer team Spartak Moscow before a match in Indian Wells. Her actions were viewed as a public show of support for her country during its invasion of Ukraine. Potapova said she had supported Spartak since she was 13 and saw no provocation in wearing the shirt. The WTA said what she did was "not acceptable nor an appropriate action". At the tournament, she lost in the third round to third seed Jessica Pegula.

Seeded 27th at the Miami Open, she reached the quarterfinals with wins over Marta Kostyuk, sixth seed Coco Gauff and 23rd seed Zheng Qinwen, before losing to Jessica Pegula once again. As a result, her ranking rose into the top 25 at world No. 21, on 3 April 2023.

At her next tournament, the Stuttgart Open, Potapova defeated qualifier Petra Martić, fifth seed Coco Gauff and fourth seed Caroline Garcia to make it through to the semifinals, where she lost to second seed Aryna Sabalenka.

Moving onto the grass-court season, she reached the semifinals at the Birmingham Classic, overcoming Marta Kostyuk, Caty McNally and Harriet Dart en route to a last four match-up with second seed and eventual champion Jelena Ostapenko which she lost in three sets. At Wimbledon, where she was seeded 22nd, Potapova defeated qualifiers Celine Naef and Kaja Juvan to reach the third round at this major for the first time. She lost to another qualifier, Mirra Andreeva, in straight sets.

In September at the San Diego Open, Potapova recorded wins over Alycia Parks and top seed Ons Jabeur to make it into the quarterfinals, where she lost to wildcard entrant Sofia Kenin.

=== 2024: Two semifinals, French Open fourth round ===
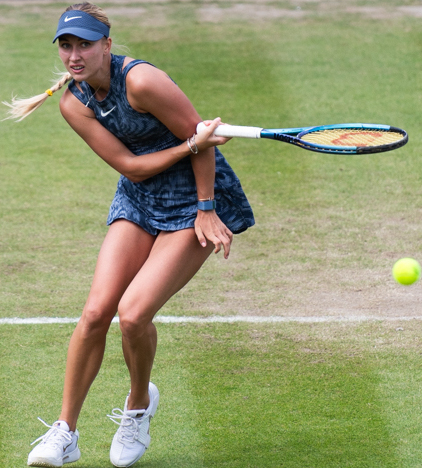
Potapova at the 2024 Birmingham Classic

Potapova started 2024 at the Brisbane International with wins over wildcard Daria Saville and sixth seed Veronika Kudermetova taking her to the quarterfinals where she retired due to an abdominal injury after losing the first set to second seed and eventual champion Elena Rybakina.

Seeking to defend her title at the Linz Open, she defeated Italians Sara Errani and Elisabetta Cocciaretto, before losing in the quarterfinals to second seed Ekaterina Alexandrova.

At the Dubai Championships, Potapova overcame Zhu Lin and Lucia Bronzetti to reach the third round, where she lost to sixth seed Zheng Qinwen.

Seeded 28th, she made it through to the quarterfinals at Indian Wells by defeating Marie Bouzková, Nadia Podoroska and Jasmine Paolini, before losing to 31st seed Marta Kostyuk.

At the French Open, Potapova recorded wins over Kamilla Rakhimova, Viktorija Golubic and Wang Xinyu, but was then double bagled by top seed Iga Świątek in a fourth round match which lasted a mere 40 minutes.

On the grass-courts of Birmingham in June, she defeated Elina Avanesyan, Lucia Bronzetti and second seed Barbora Krejčíková to reach the semifinals, where her run was ended by Ajla Tomljanović.

Potapova made her second semifinal of the year at the Cleveland Open, overcoming Diane Parry, Clara Tauson and Ana Bogdan, before losing to wildcard entry and eventual champion McCartney Kessler.

She defeated 23rd seed Leylah Fernandez and qualifier Varvara Lepchenko to reach the third round at the US Open, where she lost to Karolína Muchová.

=== 2025: Third WTA Tour singles title ===
Potapova began her 2025 season at the Brisbane International, making it through the first round when her opponent Ana Bogdan retired due to heat-related illness and then defeating 16th seed Dayana Yastremska. She lost in the third round to wildcard Kimberly Birrell. At the Australian Open, Potapova overcame qualifier Tamara Zidanšek, before losing in three sets to 27th seed Anastasia Pavlyuchenkova in the second round.

Seeded sixth at the Linz Open, Potapova defeated wildcard entrant Julia Grabher and Rebecca Šramková to reach the quarterfinals, where she lost to top seed Karolína Muchová. The following week, as top seed at the Transylvania Open in Cluj-Napoca, she won her third WTA Tour singles title overcoming Julia Grabher, Viktorija Golubic, Ella Seidel Aliaksandra Sasnovich. and Lucia Bronzetti.

At the Dubai Open, Potapova defeated 13th seed Haddad Maia to set up a second round meeting with Dayana Yastremska, which she lost in straight sets.

In April at the Madrid Open, Potapova overcame Ashlyn Krueger, eighth seed Zheng Qinwen and 32nd seed Sofia Kenin to reach the fourth round, where she lost to 24th seed Marta Kostyuk.

At the French Open she defeated 29th seed Linda Nosková to reach the second round, where she was eliminated by lucky loser Yuliia Starodubtseva.

Potapova withdrew from Wimbledon due to a hip injury and lost in the second round at the US Open to fifth seed Mirra Andreeva.

In September at the China Open, she defeated Kateřina Siniaková, 21st seed Victoria Mboko and Zeynep Sönmez to reach the fourth round, at which point she lost to 26th seed Linda Nosková.

=== 2026: Linz final, Madrid semifinal ===
At the Australian Open, Potapova defeated Suzan Lamens and 28th seed Emma Raducanu, before losing to world No. 1 Aryna Sabalenka in the third round.

Seeded fifth and defending her title from the previous year at the Transylvania Open, she recorded three sets wins over Lucia Bronzetti and Anastasia Zakharova to make it through to the quarterfinals, at which point she lost to third seed and eventual champion Sorana Cîrstea.

In April at the Linz Open, Potapova recorded wins over Zhang Shuai, qualifier Tamara Korpatsch, wildcard entrant Lilli Tagger and qualifier Donna Vekić to make it through to the final. She lost the championship match to top seed Mirra Andreeva in three sets. At the Madrid Open, Potapova lost in qualifying but entered into the second round of the main-draw as a lucky loser when 16th seed Madison Keys withdrew due to illness. She went on to defeat Zhang Shuai, 21st seed Jeļena Ostapenko, second seed Elena Rybakina and Karolína Plíšková to become the first lucky loser to reach a WTA 1000 semifinal. In the last four, Potapova lost to 26th seed Marta Kostyuk in three sets. Potapova continued her hot streak at the next WTA 1000 event, the Italian Open, where she qualified and registered wins over fellow qualifier Dalma Gálfi, 11th seed Karolína Muchová and 20th seed Liudmila Samsonova to make it into the fourth round, at which stage she lost to fifth seed Jessica Pegula. At the French Open, Potapova reached the fourth round, defeating world No. 4 and defending champion Coco Gauff en route, before losing to 22nd seed Anna Kalinskaya.

Seeded 24th at the US Open, she overcame 10th seed Amanda Anisimova en route to the fourth round, where she lost to fifth seed Mirra Andreeva.

== National representation ==
It was announced on 4 December 2025 that Potapova had changed her sporting nationality to Austria, and that she would be representing Austria in competition beginning in the 2026 season. With the switch, she became the top-ranked Austrian tennis player in the WTA, displacing previous holder Julia Grabher.

== Personal life ==
In 2022, she began a relationship with Kazakhstani player Alexander Shevchenko. On 24 September 2023, they announced their engagement, and they married on 1 December 2023. The couple divorced less than a year later in September 2024.

== Performance timelines ==
Key
W	F	SF	QF	#R	RR	Q#	P#	DNQ	A	Z#	PO	G	S	B	NMS	NTI	P	NH

(W) winner; (F) finalist; (SF) semifinalist; (QF) quarterfinalist; (#R) rounds 4, 3, 2, 1; (RR) round-robin stage; (Q#) qualification round; (P#) preliminary round; (DNQ) did not qualify; (A) absent; (Z#) Davis/Fed Cup Zonal Group (with number indication) or (PO) play-off; (G) gold, (S) silver or (B) bronze Olympic/Paralympic medal; (NMS) not a Masters tournament; (NTI) not a Tier I tournament; (P) postponed; (NH) not held; (SR) strike rate (events won / competed); (W–L) win–loss record.
To avoid confusion and double counting, these charts are updated at the conclusion of a tournament or when the player's participation has ended.

Only main-draw results in WTA Tour, Grand Slam tournaments, Billie Jean King Cup, United Cup, Hopman Cup and Olympic Games are included in win–loss records.

=== Singles ===
Current through the 2026 US Open.

Tournament	2017	2018	2019	2020	2021	2022	2023	2024	2025	2026	SR	W–L	Win %
Grand Slam tournaments
Australian Open	A	A	2R	1R	3R	1R	2R	1R	2R	3R	0 / 8	7–8	47%
French Open	A	A	2R	A	1R	Q2	3R	4R	2R	4R	0 / 6	10–6	63%
Wimbledon	1R	A	2R	NH	1R	A (Note: Suspended due to the ban of Russian and Belarusian athletes in light of the Russian invasion of Ukraine.)	3R	1R	A	1R	0 / 6	3–6	33%
US Open	A	Q3	1R	A	1R	2R	1R	3R	2R	4R	0 / 7	7–7	50%
Win–loss	0–1	0–0	3–4	0–1	2–4	1–2	5–4	5–4	3–3	8–4	0 / 27	27–27	50%
National representation
Billie Jean King Cup (Note: Formerly known as Fed Cup until 2020.)	A	WG2	PO2	A (Note: Edition is split into the two years due to COVID-19.)		DQ					0 / 0	1–1	50%
WTA 1000 tournaments
Qatar Open	NTI	A	NTI	A	NTI	A	NTI	2R	A	A	0 / 1	1–1	50%
Dubai Championships	A	NTI	A	NTI	QF	NTI	A	3R	2R	Q1	0 / 3	6–3	67%
Indian Wells Open	A	A	Q1	NH	A	1R	3R	QF	2R	2R	0 / 5	6–5	55%
Miami Open	Q2	A	Q1	NH	1R	Q2	QF	2R	1R	A	0 / 4	3–4	43%
Madrid Open	A	A	Q2	NH	Q2	1R	3R	2R	4R	SF	0 / 5	9–5	64%
Italian Open	A	A	Q1	A	Q2	A	3R	2R	2R	4R	0 / 4	6–4	60%
Canadian Open	A	A	1R	NH	2R	A	1R	1R	1R	3R	0 / 6	2–6	25%
Cincinnati Open	A	A	Q1	A	A	1R	2R	2R	2R	2R	0 / 5	3–5	38%
China Open	A	A	Q2	NH			1R	2R	4R		0 / 3	3–3	50%
Wuhan Open	A	A	A	NH				2R	A		0 / 1	1–1	50%
Guadalajara Open	NH					1R	1R	NTI			0 / 2	0–2	0%
Win–loss	0–0	0–0	0–1	0–0	4–3	0–4	7–8	10–10	10–8	9–5	0 / 39	40–39	51%
Career statistics
	2017	2018	2019	2020	2021	2022	2023	2024	2025	2026	SR	W–L	Win %
Tournaments	1	4	16	4	18	19	20	22	18	16	Career total: 137		
Titles	0	0	0	0	0	1	1	0	1	0	Career total: 3		
Finals	0	2	0	0	0	2	1	0	1	1	Career total: 7		
Hard win–loss	0–0	5–4	6–10	6–4	10–13	13–14	16–13	17–14	17–12	11–10	2 / 95	101–94	52%
Clay win–loss	0–0	4–1	7–5	0–0	1–3	11–3	7–4	6–5	6–3	14–4	1 / 30	56–28	67%
Grass win–loss	0–1	0–0	1–1	0–0	2–2	0–1	5–2	3–3	0–1	1–3	0 / 14	12–14	46%
Overall win–loss	0–1	9–5	14–16	6–4	13–18	24–18	28–19	26–22	23–16	26–17	3 / 139	169–136	55%
Win %	0%	64%	47%	60%	42%	57%	60%	54%	59%	60%	Career total: 55%		
Year-end ranking	237	94	93	100	69	43	28	35	51		$6,463,561		

=== Doubles ===
Current through the 2026 US Open.

Tournament	2017	2018	2019	2020	2021	2022	2023	2024	2025	2026	SR	W–L	Win %
Grand Slam tournaments
Australian Open	A	A	A	A	A	QF	2R	1R	1R	2R	0 / 5	5–5	50%
French Open	A	A	A	A	2R	2R	1R	2R	QF	1R	0 / 6	6–6	50%
Wimbledon	A	A	1R	NH	1R	A	A	1R	A	1R	0 / 4	0–4	0%
US Open	A	A	1R	A	A	2R	2R	1R	1R	1R	0 / 6	2–6	25%
Win–loss	0–0	0–0	0–2	0–0	1–2	5–3	2–3	1–4	3–3	1–4	0 / 21	13–21	38%
WTA 1000 tournaments
Qatar Open	NTI	A	NTI	A	NTI	A	NTI	2R	A	A	0 / 1	1–1	50%
Dubai Championships	A	NTI	A	NTI	2R	NTI	A	1R	1R	A	0 / 3	1–3	25%
Miami Open	A	A	A	NH	A	A	A	1R	A	A	0 / 1	0–1	0%
Madrid Open	A	A	A	NH	2R	A	1R	SF	A	A	0 / 3	3–3	50%
Italian Open	A	A	A	A	A	A	2R	A	A	A	0 / 1	1–1	50%
Canadian Open	A	A	1R	NH	A	A	A	A	A	A	0 / 1	0–1	0%
Cincinnati Open	A	A	A	A	A	A	A	A	1R	A	0 / 1	0–1	0%
China Open	A	A	A	NH			A	1R	A		0 / 1	0–1	0%
Guadalajara Open	NH					2R	2R	NTI			0 / 2	2–1	67%
Win–loss	0–0	0–0	0–1	0–0	2–2	0–1	2–2	4–5	0–2	0–0	0 / 14	8–13	38%
Career statistics
Titles	0	1	1	0	0	1	0	0	0	0	Career total: 3		
Finals	0	1	1	0	1	1	0	0	0	0	Career total: 4		
Year-end ranking	253	120	107	131	86	41	133	82	139				

== WTA Tour finals ==
=== Singles: 7 (3 titles, 4 runner-ups) ===
Legend Premier / WTA 500 (0–1) International / WTA 250 (3–3)	Finals by surface Hard (2–2) Clay (1–2)	Finals by setting Outdoor (1–3) Indoor (2–1)

Result	W–L	Date	Tournament	Tier	Surface	Opponent	Score
Loss	0–1	Jul 2018	Moscow River Cup, Russia	International	Clay	(Serbia) Olga Danilović	5–7, 7–6^{(7–1)}, 4–6
Loss	0–2	Sep 2018	Tashkent Open, Uzbekistan	International	Hard	(Russia) Margarita Gasparyan	2–6, 1–6
Win	1–2	Apr 2022	İstanbul Cup, Turkey	WTA 250	Clay	Veronika Kudermetova	6–3, 6–1
Loss	1–3	Jul 2022	Prague Open, Czech Republic	WTA 250	Hard	(Czech Republic) Marie Bouzková	0–6, 3–6
Win	2–3	Feb 2023	Linz Open, Austria	WTA 250	Hard (i)	(Croatia) Petra Martić	6–3, 6–1
Win	3–3	Feb 2025	Transylvania Open, Romania	WTA 250	Hard (i)	(Italy) Lucia Bronzetti	4–6, 6–1, 6–2
Loss	3–4	Apr 2026	Linz Open, Austria	WTA 500	Clay (i)	Mirra Andreeva	6–1, 4–6, 3–6

=== Doubles: 4 (3 titles, 1 runner-up) ===
Legend International / WTA 250 (3–1)	Finals by surface Hard (1–1) Clay (2–0)	Finals by setting Outdoor (3–1)

Result	W–L	Date	Tournament	Tier	Surface	Partner	Opponents	Score
Win	1–0	Jul 2018	Moscow River Cup, Russia	International	Clay	(Russia) Vera Zvonareva	(Russia) Alexandra Panova (Kazakhstan) Galina Voskoboeva	6–0, 6–3
Win	2–0	Jul 2019	Ladies Open Lausanne, Switzerland	International	Clay	(Russia) Yana Sizikova	(Australia) Monique Adamczak (China) Han Xinyun	6–2, 6–4
Loss	2–1	Feb 2021	Phillip Island Trophy, Australia	WTA 250	Hard	(Russia) Anna Blinkova	(India) Ankita Raina (Russia) Kamilla Rakhimova	6–2, 4–6, [7–10]
Win	3–1	Jul 2022	Prague Open, Czech Republic	WTA 250	Hard	Yana Sizikova	Angelina Gabueva; Anastasia Zakharova	6–3, 6–4

== ITF Circuit finals ==
=== Singles: 4 (1 title, 3 runner-ups) ===
Legend W100 tournaments (0–1) W60 tournaments (0–1) W25 tournaments (1–0) W15 tournaments (0–1)	Finals by surface Hard (1–2) Clay (0–1)

Result	W–L	Date	Tournament	Tier	Surface	Opponent	Score
Win	1–0	Mar 2017	ITF Curitiba, Brazil	W25	Hard	(United States) Amanda Anisimova	6–7^{(7)}, 7–5, 6–2
Loss	1–1	Jan 2018	ITF Sharm El Sheikh, Egypt	W15	Hard	(Belarus) Yuliya Hatouka	4–6, 6–4, 5–7
Loss	1–2	May 2018	Khimki Ladies Cup, Russia	W100	Hard (i)	(Belarus) Vera Lapko	1–6, 3–6
Loss	1–3	Jul 2018	Internazionale di Roma, Italy	W60+H	Clay	(Ukraine) Dayana Yastremska	1–6, 0–6

=== Doubles: 4 (2 titles, 2 runner-ups) ===
Legend W80 tournaments (1–0) W60 tournaments (0–1) W25 tournaments (1–0) W15 tournaments (0–1)	Finals by surface Hard (1–2) Clay (1–0)

Result	W–L	Date	Tournament	Tier	Surface	Partner	Opponents	Score
Win	1–0	May 2017	Khimki Ladies Cup, Russia	W25	Hard (i)	(Russia) Olesya Pervushina	(Russia) Ekaterina Kazionova (Russia) Daria Kruzhkova	6–0, 6–1
Win	2–0	Jul 2017	Prague Open, Czech Republic	W80	Clay	(Ukraine) Dayana Yastremska	(Romania) Mihaela Buzărnescu (Russia) Alena Fomina-Klotz	6–2, 6–2
Loss	2–1	Jan 2018	ITF Sharm El Sheikh, Egypt	W15	Hard	(Russia) Ekaterina Yashina	(New Zealand) Jade Lewis (New Zealand) Erin Routliffe	6–0, 5–7, [6–10]
Loss	2–2	Apr 2018	Lale Cup Istanbul, Turkey	W60	Hard	(Russia) Olga Doroshina	(Turkey) Ayla Aksu (United Kingdom) Harriet Dart	4–6, 6–7^{(3)}

== Junior Grand Slam tournament finals ==
=== Singles: 1 (title) ===
Result	Year	Tournament	Surface	Opponent	Score
Win	2016	Wimbledon	Grass	(Ukraine) Dayana Yastremska	6–4, 6–3

=== Doubles: 3 (runner-ups) ===
Result	Year	Tournament	Surface	Partner	Opponents	Score
Loss	2015	US Open	Hard	(Russia) Anna Kalinskaya	(Slovakia) Viktória Kužmová (Russia) Aleksandra Pospelova	5–7, 2–6
Loss	2016	French Open	Clay	(Russia) Olesya Pervushina	(Spain) Paula Arias Manjón (Serbia) Olga Danilović	6–3, 3–6, [8–10]
Loss	2017	French Open	Clay	(Russia) Olesya Pervushina	(Canada) Bianca Andreescu (Canada) Carson Branstine	1–6, 3–6

== Fed Cup/Billie Jean King Cup participation ==
Legend
World Group 2 (0–1)
World Group 2 Play-off (2–0)
Zone Group RR / PO (1–0)

=== Singles (1–1) ===
Edition	Round	Date	Location	Against	Surface	Opponent	W/L	Result
2018	WG2	Feb 2018	Bratislava (SVK)	Slovakia	Hard (i)	Viktória Kužmová	L	6–3, 3–6, 4–6
2019	WG2 PO	Apr 2019	Moscow (RUS)	Italy	Clay (i)	Martina Trevisan	W	2–6, 6–3, 6–1

=== Doubles (2–0) ===
Edition	Round	Date		Against	Surface	Partner	Opponents	W/L	Result
2019	Z1 RR	Feb 2019	Zielona Góra (POL)	Denmark	Hard (i)	Margarita Gasparyan	Karen Barritza; Maria Jespersen	W	6–2, 6–2
2019	WG2 PO	Apr 2019	Moscow (RUS)	Italy	Clay (i)	Vlada Koval	Sara Errani; Jasmine Paolini	W	4–6, 6–3, [10–7]

== Wins against top 10 players ==
- Potapova's match record against players who were, at the time the match was played, ranked in the top 10.

Season	2019	...	2022	2023	...	2025	2026	Total
Wins	1		1	4		1	2	9

No.	Player	Rk	Event	Surface	Rd	Score	Rk	Years	Ref
1.	(Germany) Angelique Kerber	5	French Open, France	Clay	1R	6–4, 6–2	81	2019	
2.	(Estonia) Anett Kontaveit	2	Prague Open, Czech Republic	Hard	QF	6–1, 6–1	59	2022	
3.	(United States) Coco Gauff	6	Miami Open, United States	Hard	3R	6–7^{(8–10)}, 7–5, 6–2	26	2023	
4.	(United States) Coco Gauff	6	Stuttgart Open, Germany	Clay (i)	2R	6–2, 6–3	24	2023	
5.	(France) Caroline Garcia	5	Stuttgart Open, Germany	Clay (i)	QF	4–6, 6–3, 6–3	24	2023	
6.	(Tunisia) Ons Jabeur	7	San Diego Open, United States	Hard	2R	6–4, 7–6^{(7–4)}	27	2023	
7.	(China) Zheng Qinwen	8	Madrid Open, Spain	Clay	2R	6–4, 6–4	39	2025	
8.	(Kazakhstan) Elena Rybakina	2	Madrid Open, Spain	Clay	4R	7–6^{(10–8)}, 6–4	56	2026	
9.	(United States) Coco Gauff	4	French Open, France	Clay	3R	4–6, 7–6^{(7–1)}, 6–4	30	2026	

- Key: (Rk) first use, opponent rank; (Rd) round; (Rk) 2nd use, player rank; (Ref) reference; (F) final; (SF) semifinal; (QF) quarterfinal; (#R) rounds 4, 3, 2, 1; (RR) round-robin stage; (Q#) qualifying rounds or stages (3), 2, 1.

== Awards ==
2016

- The Russian Cup in the nomination Girls Under-18 Team of the Year

== Notes ==
Awards
Preceded by (Hungary) Dalma Gálfi	ITF Junior World Champion; 2016	Succeeded by (United States) Whitney Osuigwe
Sporting positions
Preceded by (United States) Claire Liu	Junior Orange Bowl Girls' Singles Champion; Category: 14 and under 2014	Succeeded by (Ukraine) Marta Kostyuk
Preceded by (India) Pranjala Yadlapalli / (Slovenia) Tamara Zidanšek	Orange Bowl Girls' Doubles Champion; 2016; With: (Serbia) Olga Danilović	Succeeded by (Chinese Taipei) Joanna Garland / (Japan) Naho Sato
