= Veronika Kudermetova career statistics =

Career statistics of female tennis player

Career finals
Discipline	Type	Won	Lost	Total	WR
Singles	Grand Slam	–	–	–	–
Singles	Summer Olympics	–	–	–	–
Singles	WTA Finals	–	–	–	–
Singles	WTA 1000	–	–	–	–
Singles	WTA Tour	2	5	7	0.29
Singles	Total	2	5	7	0.29
Doubles	Grand Slam	0	1	1	0.00
Doubles	Summer Olympics	–	–	–	–
Doubles	WTA Finals	2	0	2	1.00
Doubles	WTA 1000	3	6	9	0.33
Doubles	WTA Tour	5	5	10	0.50
Doubles	Total	10	12	22	0.45
Total		12	17	29	0.41

This is the list of the main career statistics of professional Russian tennis player Veronika Kudermetova. She left her mark in both singles and doubles events, her achievements happened on many levels. On the WTA rankings, she get to her both career-highs in 2022; in singles, to the place of No. 9 while in doubles, she became world No. 2. She has won two singles titles and ten doubles titles on the WTA Tour. In addition, she has won five WTA Challenger titles (one in singles and four in doubles), as well as 20 ITF Circuit titles (4 in singles, 16 in doubles). She has been also active in playing in international tournaments for Russia, winning one Billie Jean King Cup title and reaching fourth place at the Summer Olympics in doubles event alongside Elena Vesnina.

At the WTA Tour-level tournaments, she first get most recognized when she won title at the 2019 Wuhan Open alongside Duan Yingying. The following year, she reached her first major semifinal in doubles event. Her improvements at the major tournaments continued, reaching first final at the 2021 Wimbledon Championships, alongside Elena Vesnina. At the 2022 French Open, she advanced to her first quarterfinal in singles at a major. Her 2021 season was remarkable when she reached semifinals in doubles on her Olympics debut. In November 2021, she won her first title in the Billie Jean King Cup, after ensuring three wins in doubles for the Russian team during the Finals stage.

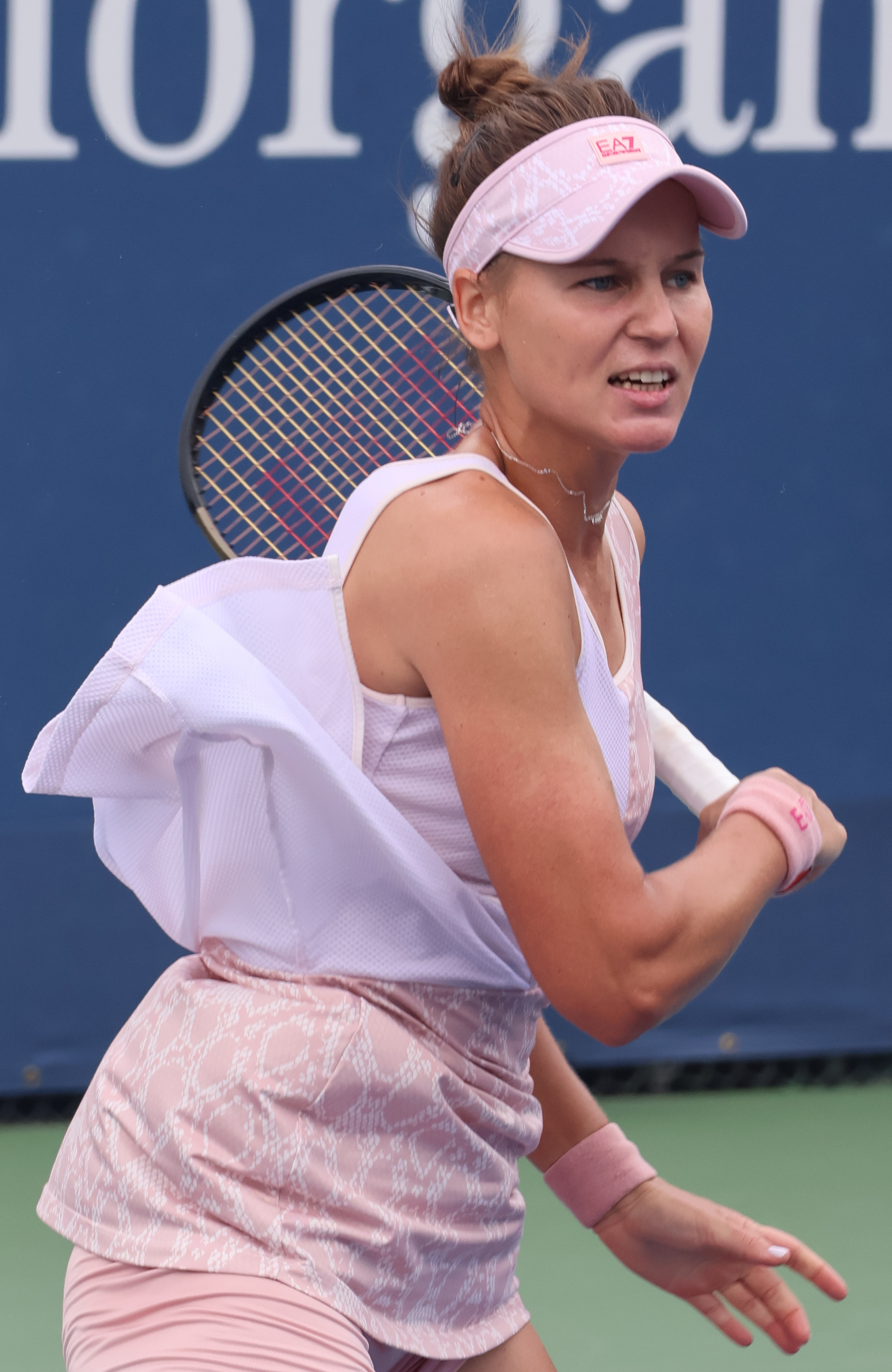
Kudermetova at the 2023 US Open.

== Performance timelines ==
Key
W	F	SF	QF	#R	RR	Q#	P#	DNQ	A	Z#	PO	G	S	B	NMS	NTI	P	NH

(W) winner; (F) finalist; (SF) semifinalist; (QF) quarterfinalist; (#R) rounds 4, 3, 2, 1; (RR) round-robin stage; (Q#) qualification round; (P#) preliminary round; (DNQ) did not qualify; (A) absent; (Z#) Davis/Fed Cup Zonal Group (with number indication) or (PO) play-off; (G) gold, (S) silver or (B) bronze Olympic/Paralympic medal; (NMS) not a Masters tournament; (NTI) not a Tier I tournament; (P) postponed; (NH) not held; (SR) strike rate (events won / competed); (W–L) win–loss record.
To avoid confusion and double counting, these charts are updated at the conclusion of a tournament or when the player's participation has ended.

Only main-draw results in WTA Tour, Grand Slam tournaments, Billie Jean King Cup, United Cup, Hopman Cup and Olympic Games are included in win–loss records.

=== Singles ===
Current through the 2025 WTA Tour.

Tournament	2014	2015	2016	2017	2018	2019	2020	2021	2022	2023	2024	2025	SR	W–L	Win %
Grand Slam tournaments
Australian Open	A	A	A	Q1	A	1R	1R	3R	3R	2R	1R	4R	0 / 7	8–7	53%
French Open	A	A	A	Q2	Q3	3R	2R	2R	QF	1R	1R	3R	0 / 7	10–7	59%
Wimbledon	A	A	A	Q1	Q2	2R	NH	1R	A (Note: Suspended due to the ban of Russian and Belarusian athletes in light of the Russian invasion of Ukraine.)	2R	1R	2R	0 / 5	4–5	44%
US Open	A	A	A	Q1	Q2	1R	1R	1R	4R	1R	1R	1R	0 / 6	3–6	33%
Win–Loss	0–0	0–0	0–0	0–0	0–0	3–4	1–3	3–4	9–3	2–4	0–4	6–3	0 / 25	24–26	48%
Year-end championships
WTA Finals	DNQ						NH	DNQ	Alt	DNQ			0 / 0	0–0	–
WTA Elite Trophy	DNQ						NH			RR	NH	NH	0 / 1	1–1	50%
National representation
Summer Olympics	NH		A	NH				1R	NH		A	NH	0 / 1	0–1	0%
Billie Jean King Cup (Note: Formerly known as Fed Cup until 2020.)	1R	A	A	A	PO	A	W (Note: Edition is split into the two years due to COVID-19.)		DQ (Note: Suspended due to the ban of Russian and Belarusian athletes in light of the Russian invasion of Ukraine.)				1 / 2	0–3	0%
WTA 1000
Qatar Open (Note: The first Premier 5 event of the year has switched back and forth between the Dubai Tennis Championships and the Qatar Open since 2009. Dubai was classified as a Premier 5 event from 2009 to 2011 before being succeeded by Doha for the 2012–2014 period. In 2015, Dubai regained its Premier 5 status while Doha was demoted to Premier status. The Premier 5 tournaments were reclassified as WTA 1000 tournaments in 2021.)	A	NTI	A	NTI	A	NTI	2R	NTI	1R	NTI	1R	1R	0 / 4	1–4	20%
Dubai	NTI	A	NTI	A	NTI	A	NTI	2R	NTI	1R	2R	2R	0 / 4	3–4	43%
Indian Wells Open	A	A	A	A	A	Q2	NH	3R	QF	3R	3R	1R	0 / 5	6–5	55%
Miami Open	A	A	A	A	A	Q1	NH	3R	4R	2R	2R	2R	0 / 5	4–5	44%
Madrid Open	A	A	A	A	A	Q1	NH	3R	1R	SF	2R	3R	0 / 5	8–5	62%
Italian Open	A	A	A	A	A	Q1	1R	3R	1R	SF	2R	3R	0 / 6	8–6	57%
Canadian Open	A	A	A	A	A	A	NH	2R	1R	A	A	3R	0 / 3	3–3	50%
Cincinnati Open	A	A	A	A	A	2R	3R	2R	3R	1R	A	SF	0 / 6	10–6	63%
Guadalajara Open	NH								QF	3R	NMS	A	0 / 2	3–2	60%
Wuhan Open	A	A	A	A	A	3R	NH				2R	1R	0 / 3	3–3	50%
China Open	A	A	A	A	A	1R	NH			3R	3R	3R	0 / 4	4–4	50%
Win–loss	0–0	0–0	0–0	0–0	0–0	3–3	3–3	9–7	8–8	11–8	4–8	15–10	0 / 47	53–47	53%
Career statistics
	2014	2015	2016	2017	2018	2019	2020	2021	2022	2023	2024	2025	SR	W–L	Win %
Tournaments	0	0	0	0	5	20	12	25	20	25	16	19	Career total: 138		
Titles	0	0	0	0	0	0	0	1	0	1	0	0	Career total: 2		
Finals	0	0	0	0	0	0	0	2	3	1	0	0	Career total: 7		
Hard win–loss	0–1	0–0	0–0	0–0	1–2	14–11	11–11	18–17	27–14	19–15	6–10	17–13	1 / 93	111–93	54%
Clay win–loss	0–0	0–0	0–0	0–0	3–2	9–6	1–3	14–4	7–4	8–5	2–4	7–5	1 / 33	51–33	61%
Grass win–loss	0–0	0–0	0–0	0–0	2–1	4–3	0–0	1–3	5–2	7–2	3–2	3–3	0 / 17	25–16	61%
Overall win–loss	0–1	0–0	0–0	0–0	6–5	27–20	12–14	33–24	39–20	34–22	11–16	27–21	2 / 142	188–143	57%
Win (%)	0%	–	–	–	55%	57%	46%	58%	66%	61%	41%	56%	Career total: 57%		
Year-end ranking (Note: 2012: WTA ranking–715, 2013: WTA ranking–671.)	343	400	210	257	115	41	46	31	9	19	77	30	$6,534,927		

=== Doubles ===
Current through the 2025 WTA Tour.

Tournament	2014	2015	2016	2017	2018	2019	2020	2021	2022	2023	2024	2025	SR	W–L	Win%
Grand Slam tournaments
Australian Open	A	A	A	A	1R	2R	3R	1R	SF	1R	2R (Note: Withdrew during the tournament. Not counted as a loss.)	2R	0 / 8	9–7	56%
French Open	A	A	A	1R	1R	1R	3R	1R	3R	QF	3R	QF	0 / 9	12–9	57%
Wimbledon	A	A	A	2R	2R	1R	NH	F	A	A	3R	W	1 / 6	15–5	64%
US Open	A	A	A	1R	1R	1R	SF	3R	2R	2R	SF	SF	0 / 9	16–9	64%
Win–Loss	0–0	0–0	0–0	1–3	1–4	1–4	8–3	7–4	7–2	4–3	9–3	14–3	1 / 32	52–30	63%
Year-end championships
WTA Finals	DNQ						NH	DNQ	W	DNQ	SF	W	2 / 3	11–3	79%
WTA Elite Trophy	DNQ						NH			W	NH		1 / 1	3–0	100%
National representation
Summer Olympics	NH		A	NH				SF-4th	NH		A	NH	0 / 1	3–2	60%
WTA 1000
Qatar Open	A	NTI	A	NTI	2R	NTI	2R	NTI	F	NTI	1R	A	0 / 4	5–4	56%
Dubai	NTI	A	NTI	1R	NTI	1R	NTI	SF	NTI	W	1R	A	1 / 5	8–4	67%
Indian Wells Open	A	A	A	A	A	1R	NH	F	1R	1R	1R	A	0 / 5	4–5	44%
Miami Open	A	A	A	A	A	2R	NH	2R	F	2R	1R	A	0 / 5	7–5	58%
Madrid Open	A	A	A	A	A	SF	NH	2R	A	1R	2R	A	0 / 4	4–4	50%
Italian Open	A	A	A	A	A	2R	QF	QF	W	1R	2R	A	1 / 6	11–4	73%
Canadian Open	A	A	A	A	A	A	NH	SF	2R	A	A	2R	0 / 3	4–3	57%
Cincinnati Open	A	A	A	A	A	1R	QF	2R	SF	A	A	2R	0 / 5	6–5	55%
Guadalajara Open	NH								QF	2R	NMS	A	0 / 2	2–0	100%
China Open	A	A	A	A	A	1R	NH			3R	F	2R	0 / 4	6–4	60%
Wuhan Open	A	A	A	A	A	W	NH				QF	A	1 / 2	6–1	86%
Career statistics
	2014	2015	2016	2017	2018	2019	2020	2021	2022	2023	2024	2025	SR	W–L	Win %
Tournaments	1	0	3	9	16	19	9	19	15	12	16		Career total: 118		
Titles	0	0	0	0	0	1	0	1	3	2	1		Career total: 8		
Finals	0	0	0	0	0	3	0	3	6	2	4		Career total: 16		
Overall win–loss	1–1	0–0	4–3	7–9	11–17	20–18	14–9	40–18	38–10	13–10	31–15		6 / 119	181–108	63%
Win (%)	50%	–	57%	44%	39%	53%	61%	69%	79%	57%	67%		Career total: 63%		
Year-end ranking	198	230	107	58	64	25	24	14	2	29	17	6			

== Grand Slam tournament finals ==
=== Doubles: 2 (1 title, 1 runner-up) ===
Result	Year	Championship	Surface	Partner	Opponents	Score
Loss	2021	Wimbledon	Grass	(Russia) Elena Vesnina	(Chinese Taipei) Hsieh Su-wei (Belgium) Elise Mertens	6–3, 5–7, 7–9
Win	2025	Wimbledon	Grass	(Belgium) Elise Mertens	(Chinese Taipei) Hsieh Su-wei (Latvia) Jeļena Ostapenko	3–6, 6–2, 6–4

== Other significant finals ==
=== Year-end championships ===
==== Doubles: 2 (2 titles) ====
Result	Year	Tournament	Surface	Partner	Opponents	Score
Win	2022	WTA Finals, United States	Hard (i)	(Belgium) Elise Mertens	(Czech Republic) Barbora Krejčíková (Czech Republic) Kateřina Siniaková	6–2, 4–6, [11–9]
Win	2025	WTA Finals, Saudi Arabia (2)	Hard (i)	(Belgium) Elise Mertens	(Hungary) Tímea Babos (Brazil) Luisa Stefani	7–6^{(7–4)}, 6–1

=== Summer Olympics ===
==== Doubles: 1 (4th place) ====
Result	Year	Tournament	Surface	Partner	Opponents	Score
4th place	2021	2020 Tokyo Olympics	Hard	(Russia) Elena Vesnina	(Brazil) Laura Pigossi (Brazil) Luisa Stefani	6–4, 4–6, [9–11]

=== WTA 1000 tournaments ===
==== Doubles: 9 (3 titles, 6 runner-ups) ====
Result	Year	Tournament	Surface	Partner	Opponents	Score
Win	2019	Wuhan Open	Hard	(China) Duan Yingying	(Belgium) Elise Mertens (Belarus) Aryna Sabalenka	7–6^{(7–3)}, 6–2
Loss	2021	Indian Wells Open	Hard	(Kazakhstan) Elena Rybakina	(Chinese Taipei) Hsieh Su-wei (Belgium) Elise Mertens	6–7^{(1–7)}, 3–6
Loss	2022	Qatar Ladies Open	Hard	(Belgium) Elise Mertens	(United States) Coco Gauff (United States) Jessica Pegula	6–3, 5–7, [5–10]
Loss	2022	Miami Open	Hard	(Belgium) Elise Mertens	(Germany) Laura Siegemund; Vera Zvonareva	6–7^{(3–7)}, 5–7
Win	2022	Italian Open	Clay	Anastasia Pavlyuchenkova	(Canada) Gabriela Dabrowski (Mexico) Giuliana Olmos	1–6, 6–4, [10–7]
Win	2023	Dubai Championships	Hard	Liudmila Samsonova	(Chinese Taipei) Chan Hao-ching (Chinese Taipei) Latisha Chan	6–4, 6–7^{(4–7)}, [10–1]
Loss	2024	China Open	Hard	(Chinese Taipei) Chan Hao-ching	(Italy) Sara Errani (Italy) Jasmine Paolini	4–6, 4–6
Loss	2025	Madrid Open	Clay	(Belgium) Elise Mertens	(Romania) Sorana Cîrstea; Anna Kalinskaya	7–6^{(12–10)}, 2–6, [10–12]
Loss	2025	Italian Open	Clay	(Belgium) Elise Mertens	(Italy) Sara Errani (Italy) Jasmine Paolini	4–6, 5–7

=== WTA Elite Trophy ===
==== Doubles: 1 (title) ====
Result	Year	Tournament	Surface	Partner	Opponents	Score
Win	2023	Elite Trophy, China	Hard	(Brazil) Beatriz Haddad Maia	(Japan) Miyu Kato (Indonesia) Aldila Sutjiadi	6–3, 6–3

== WTA Tour finals ==
=== Singles: 7 (2 titles, 5 runner-ups) ===
Legend WTA 1000 WTA 500 (2–2) WTA 250 (0–3)	Finals by surface Hard (1–3) Clay (1–1) Grass (0–1)	Finals by setting Outdoor (2–5) Indoor (0–0)

Result	W–L	Date	Tournament	Tier	Surface	Opponent	Score
Loss	0–1	Jan 2021	Abu Dhabi Open, UAE	WTA 500	Hard	(Belarus) Aryna Sabalenka	2–6, 2–6
Win	1–1	Apr 2021	Charleston Open, United States	WTA 500	Clay (green)	(Montenegro) Danka Kovinić	6–4, 6–2
Loss	1–2	Jan 2022	Melbourne Summer Set, Australia	WTA 250	Hard	(Romania) Simona Halep	2–6, 3–6
Loss	1–3	Feb 2022	Dubai Championships, UAE	WTA 500	Hard	(Latvia) Jeļena Ostapenko	0–6, 4–6
Loss	1–4	Apr 2022	İstanbul Cup, Turkey	WTA 250	Clay	Anastasia Potapova	3–6, 1–6
Loss	1–5	Jun 2023	Rosmalen Open, Netherlands	WTA 250	Grass	Ekaterina Alexandrova	6–4, 4–6, 6–7^{(3–7)}
Win	2–5	Oct 2023	Pan Pacific Open, Japan	WTA 500	Hard	(United States) Jessica Pegula	7–5, 6–1

=== Doubles: 22 (10 titles, 12 runner-ups) ===
Legend Grand Slam (1–1) WTA Finals (2–0) WTA Elite Trophy (1–0) WTA 1000 (3–6) WTA 500 (2–3) WTA 250 (1–2)	Finals by surface Hard (7–4) Clay (2–4) Grass (1–4)	Finals by setting Outdoor (7–12) Indoor (3–0)

Result	W–L	Date	Tournament	Tier	Surface	Partner	Opponents	Score
Loss	0–1	Apr 2019	Charleston Open, United States	Premier (Note: The WTA Premier tournaments were reclassified as WTA 500 tournaments in 2021.)	Clay (green)	(Russia) Irina Khromacheva	(Germany) Anna-Lena Grönefeld (Poland) Alicja Rosolska	6–7^{(7–9)}, 2–6
Loss	0–2	Apr 2019	Ladies Open Lugano, Switzerland	International (Note: The WTA International tournaments were reclassified as WTA 250 tournaments in 2021.)	Clay	(Kazakhstan) Galina Voskoboeva	(Romania) Sorana Cîrstea (Romania) Andreea Mitu	6–1, 2–6, [8–10]
Win	1–2	Sep 2019	Wuhan Open, China	Premier 5 (Note: The Premier 5 & Mandatory tournaments were reclassified as WTA 1000 tournaments in 2021.)	Hard	(China) Duan Yingying	(Belgium) Elise Mertens (Belarus) Aryna Sabalenka	7–6^{(7–3)}, 6–2
Win	2–2	Apr 2021	İstanbul Cup, Turkey	WTA 250	Hard	(Belgium) Elise Mertens	(Japan) Nao Hibino (Japan) Makoto Ninomiya	6–1, 6–1
Loss	2–3	Jul 2021	Wimbledon, United Kingdom	Grand Slam	Grass	(Russia) Elena Vesnina	(Chinese Taipei) Hsieh Su-wei (Belgium) Elise Mertens	6–3, 5–7, 7–9
Loss	2–4	Oct 2021	Indian Wells Open, United States	WTA 1000	Hard	(Kazakhstan) Elena Rybakina	(Chinese Taipei) Hsieh Su-wei (Belgium) Elise Mertens	6–7^{(1–7)}, 3–6
Win	3–4	Feb 2022	Dubai Championships, UAE	WTA 500	Hard	(Belgium) Elise Mertens	(Ukraine) Lyudmyla Kichenok (Latvia) Jeļena Ostapenko	6–1, 6–3
Loss	3–5	Feb 2022	Qatar Ladies Open, Qatar	WTA 1000	Hard	(Belgium) Elise Mertens	(United States) Coco Gauff (United States) Jessica Pegula	6–3, 5–7, [5–10]
Loss	3–6	Apr 2022	Miami Open, United States	WTA 1000	Hard	(Belgium) Elise Mertens	(Germany) Laura Siegemund; Vera Zvonareva	6–7^{(3–7)}, 5–7
Win	4–6	May 2022	Italian Open, Italy	WTA 1000	Clay	Anastasia Pavlyuchenkova	(Canada) Gabriela Dabrowski (Mexico) Giuliana Olmos	1–6, 6–4, [10–7]
Loss	4–7	Jun 2022	Rosmalen Open, Netherlands	WTA 250	Grass	(Belgium) Elise Mertens	(Australia) Ellen Perez (Slovenia) Tamara Zidanšek	3–6, 7–5, [10–12]
Win	5–7	Nov 2022	WTA Finals, United States	Finals	Hard (i)	(Belgium) Elise Mertens	(Czech Republic) Barbora Krejčíková (Czech Republic) Kateřina Siniaková	6–2, 4–6, [11–9]
Win	6–7	Feb 2023	Dubai Championships, UAE	WTA 1000	Hard	Liudmila Samsonova	(Chinese Taipei) Chan Hao-ching (Chinese Taipei) Latisha Chan	6–4, 6–7^{(4–7)}, [10–1]
Win	7–7	Oct 2023	WTA Elite Trophy, China	Elite Trophy	Hard	(Brazil) Beatriz Haddad Maia	(Japan) Miyu Kato (Indonesia) Aldila Sutjiadi	6–3, 6–3
Win	8–7	Apr 2024	Stuttgart Grand Prix, Germany	WTA 500	Clay (i)	(Chinese Taipei) Chan Hao-ching	(Norway) Ulrikke Eikeri (Estonia) Ingrid Neel	4–6, 6–3, [10–2]
Loss	8–8	Jun 2024	Berlin Open, Germany	WTA 500	Grass	(Chinese Taipei) Chan Hao-ching	(China) Wang Xinyu (China) Zheng Saisai	2–6, 5–7
Loss	8–9	Jun 2024	Bad Homburg Open, Germany	WTA 500	Grass	(Chinese Taipei) Chan Hao-ching	(United States) Nicole Melichar-Martinez (Australia) Ellen Perez	6–4, 3–6, [8–10]
Loss	8–10	Oct 2024	China Open, China	WTA 1000	Hard	(Chinese Taipei) Chan Hao-ching	(Italy) Sara Errani (Italy) Jasmine Paolini	4–6, 4–6
Loss	8–11	Apr 2025	Madrid Open, Spain	WTA 1000	Clay	(Belgium) Elise Mertens	(Romania) Sorana Cîrstea; Anna Kalinskaya	7–6^{(12–10)}, 2–6, [10–12]
Loss	8–12	May 2025	Italian Open, Italy	WTA 1000	Clay	(Belgium) Elise Mertens	(Italy) Sara Errani (Italy) Jasmine Paolini	4–6, 5–7
Win	9–12	Jul 2025	Wimbledon, United Kingdom	Grand Slam	Grass	(Belgium) Elise Mertens	(Chinese Taipei) Hsieh Su-wei (Latvia) Jeļena Ostapenko	3–6, 6–2, 6–4
Win	10–12	Nov 2025	WTA Finals, Saudi Arabia (2)	Finals	Hard (i)	(Belgium) Elise Mertens	(Hungary) Tímea Babos (Brazil) Luisa Stefani	7–6^{(7–4)}, 6–1

== WTA 125 finals ==
=== Singles: 1 (title) ===
Result	W–L	Date	Tournament	Surface	Opponent	Score
Win	1–0	Mar 2019	Abierto Zapopan, Mexico	Hard	(Czech Republic) Marie Bouzková	6–2, 6–0

=== Doubles: 4 (4 titles) ===
Result	W–L	Date	Tournament	Surface	Partner	Opponents	Score
Win	1–0	Nov 2016	Taipei Open, Taiwan	Carpet (i)	(Russia) Natela Dzalamidze	(Chinese Taipei) Chang Kai-chen (Chinese Taipei) Chuang Chia-jung	4–6, 6–3, [10–5]
Win	2–0	Nov 2017	Taipei Open, Taiwan (2)	Carpet (i)	(Belarus) Aryna Sabalenka	(Australia) Monique Adamczak (United Kingdom) Naomi Broady	2–6, 7–6^{(7–5)}, [10–6]
Win	3–0	Nov 2018	Mumbai Open, India	Hard	(Russia) Natela Dzalamidze	(Netherlands) Bibiane Schoofs (Czech Republic) Barbora Štefková	6–4, 7–6^{(7–4)}
Win	4–0	Nov 2018	Open de Limoges, France	Hard (i)	(Kazakhstan) Galina Voskoboeva	(Switzerland) Timea Bacsinszky (Russia) Vera Zvonareva	7–5, 6–4

== ITF Circuit finals ==
Kudermetova debuted on the ITF Women's Circuit in 2011, at the $50k event in Kazan, Russia in doubles. In singles, she has been in eight finals and won four of them, while in doubles, she won 16 of 27 finals.

=== Singles: 8 (4 titles, 4 runner-ups) ===
Legend $60,000 tournaments $25,000 tournaments (3–3) $10,000 tournaments (1–1)	Finals by surface Hard (2–4) Clay (1–0) Carpet (1–0)

Result	W–L	Date	Tournament	Tier	Surface	Opponent	Score
Loss	0–1	Mar 2014	ITF Astana, Kazakhstan	10,000	Hard (i)	(Russia) Olga Doroshina	7–6^{(7–5)}, 4–6, 6–7^{(6–8)}
Win	1–1	Mar 2014	ITF Astana, Kazakhstan	10,000	Hard (i)	(Russia) Olga Doroshina	7–6^{(7–2)}, 7–6^{(7–3)}
Loss	1–2	Jun 2015	ITF Andijan, Uzbekistan	25,000	Hard	(Czech Republic) Barbora Štefková	5–7, 3–6
Loss	1–3	May 2016	ITF Andijan, Uzbekistan	25,000	Hard	(Uzbekistan) Sabina Sharipova	5–7, 0–6
Win	2–3	Jul 2016	ITF Imola, Italy	25,000	Carpet	(Netherlands) Michaëlla Krajicek	6–4, 6–2
Loss	2–4	Jul 2016	President's Cup, Kazakhstan	25,000	Hard	(Ukraine) Alyona Sotnikova	2–6, 3–6
Win	3–4	Sep 2016	Telavi Open, Georgia	25,000	Clay	(Israel) Deniz Khazaniuk	7–5, 6–4
Win	4–4	Mar 2018	Yokohama Challenger, Japan	25,000	Hard	(United Kingdom) Harriet Dart	6–2, 6–4

=== Doubles: 27 (16 titles, 11 runner-ups) ===
Legend $100,000 tournaments (3–0) $50/60,000 tournaments (3–0) $25,000 tournaments (8–11) $10,000 tournaments (2–0)	Finals by surface Hard (9–7) Clay (7–4)

Result	W–L	Date	Tournament	Tier	Surface	Partner	Opponents	Score
Loss	0–1	Jun 2013	ITF Lenzerheide, Switzerland	25,000	Clay	(Latvia) Diāna Marcinkēviča	(Switzerland) Belinda Bencic (Czech Republic) Kateřina Siniaková	0–6, 2–6
Win	1–1	Jun 2013	ITF Shymkent, Kazakhstan	10,000	Clay	(Russia) Margarita Lazareva	(Kazakhstan) Yekaterina Gubanova (Russia) Daria Lodikova	6–4, 6–2
Win	2–1	Aug 2013	Kazan Open, Russia	50,000	Hard	(Russia) Evgeniya Rodina	(Russia) Alexandra Artamonova (Czech Republic) Martina Borecká	5–7, 6–0, [10–8]
Loss	2–2	Feb 2014	ITF Moscow, Russia	25,000	Hard (i)	(Belarus) Sviatlana Pirazhenka	(Ukraine) Valentyna Ivakhnenko (Ukraine) Kateryna Kozlova	6–7^{(6)}, 4–6
Loss	2–3	Apr 2014	ITF Qarshi, Uzbekistan	25,000	Hard	(Russia) Ekaterina Bychkova	(Uzbekistan) Albina Khabibulina (Ukraine) Anastasiya Vasylyeva	6–2, 5–7, [4–10]
Win	3–3	May 2014	ITF Andijan, Uzbekistan	10,000	Clay	(Uzbekistan) Albina Khabibulina	(Russia) Polina Monova (Russia) Yana Sizikova	6–4, 7–6^{(5)}
Loss	3–4	Jul 2014	ITF Middelburg, Netherlands	25,000	Clay	(Russia) Evgeniya Rodina	(Netherlands) Angelique van der Meet (Netherlands) Bernice van de Velde	6–7^{(4)}, 6–3, [5–10]
Win	4–4	Sep 2014	ITF Moscow, Russia	25,000	Clay	(Switzerland) Xenia Knoll	(Russia) Alexandra Artamonova (Russia) Polina Monova	7–6^{(10)}, 7–5
Loss	4–5	Feb 2015	ITF Moscow, Russia	25,000	Hard (i)	(Russia) Natela Dzalamidze	(Belarus) Lidziya Marozava (Ukraine) Anastasiya Vasylyeva	4–6, 4–6
Loss	4–6	Jun 2015	ITF Andijan, Uzbekistan	25,000	Hard	(Russia) Ksenia Lykina	(Uzbekistan) Nigina Abduraimova (Japan) Hiroko Kuwata	6–4, 6–7^{(5)}, [9–11]
Loss	4–7	Jun 2015	ITF Namangan, Uzbekistan	25,000	Hard	(Russia) Ksenia Lykina	(Russia) Anastasiya Komardina (Bulgaria) Julia Terziyska	6–7^{(2)}, 5–7
Win	5–7	Aug 2015	ITF Moscow, Russia	25,000	Clay	(Russia) Natela Dzalamidze	(Ukraine) Oleksandra Korashvili (Ukraine) Valeriya Strakhova	6–3, 6–3
Loss	5–8	Aug 2015	Neva Cup St. Petersburg, Russia	25,000	Clay	(Russia) Natela Dzalamidze	(Germany) Carolin Daniels (Belarus) Lidziya Marozava	4–6, 6–4, [6–10]
Win	6–8	Nov 2015	ITF Minsk, Belarus	25,000	Hard (i)	(Turkey) Başak Eraydın	(Russia) Anastasia Frolova (Russia) Ekaterina Yashina	6–3, 6–1
Win	7–8	Jan 2016	ITF Daytona Beach, United States	25,000	Clay	(Russia) Natela Dzalamidze	(Canada) Sharon Fichman (Canada) Carol Zhao	6–4, 6–3
Loss	7–9	Jan 2016	ITF Wesley Chapel, United States	25,000	Clay	(Russia) Natela Dzalamidze	(United States) Ingrid Neel (Russia) Natalia Vikhlyantseva	6–4, 6–7^{(4)}, [6–10]
Loss	7–10	Feb 2016	ITF New Delhi, India	25,000	Hard	(Russia) Natela Dzalamidze	(Chinese Taipei) Hsu Ching-wen (Chinese Taipei) Lee Ya-hsuan	0–6, 6–0, [6–10]
Win	8–10	Apr 2016	ITF Qarshi, Uzbekistan	25,000	Hard	(Russia) Natela Dzalamidze	(Russia) Ksenia Lykina (Russia) Polina Monova	4–6, 6–4, [10–7]
Loss	8–11	Jun 2016	ITF Namangan, Uzbekistan	25,000	Hard	(Slovakia) Tereza Mihalíková	(Russia) Ksenia Lykina (Russia) Polina Monova	6–3, 3–6, [5–10]
Win	9–11	Jun 2016	ITF Moscow, Russia	25,000	Clay	(Russia) Natela Dzalamidze	(Russia) Anna Morgina (Ukraine) Ganna Poznikhirenko	6–1, 6–2
Win	10–11	Jul 2016	ITF Astana, Kazakhstan	25,000	Hard	(Russia) Natela Dzalamidze	(Russia) Polina Monova (Russia) Yana Sizikova	6–2, 6–3
Win	11–11	Sep 2016	Telavi Open, Georgia	25,000	Clay	(Russia) Natela Dzalamidze	(Georgia (country)) Tatia Mikadze (Georgia (country)) Sofia Shapatava	6–4, 6–2
Win	12–11	Oct 2016	Liuzhou Challenger, China	50,000	Hard	(Russia) Aleksandra Pospelova	(United States) Jacqueline Cako (Uzbekistan) Sabina Sharipova	6–2, 6–4
Win	13–11	Apr 2017	Lale Cup Istanbul, Turkey	60,000	Hard	(Turkey) İpek Soylu	(Russia) Ksenia Lykina (Russia) Polina Monova	4–6, 7–5, [11–9]
Win	14–11	Jun 2017	Open de Marseille, France	100,000	Clay	(Russia) Natela Dzalamidze	(Hungary) Dalma Gálfi (Slovenia) Dalila Jakupović	7–6^{(5)}, 6–4
Win	15–11	Jul 2017	President's Cup, Kazakhstan	100,000	Hard	(Russia) Natela Dzalamidze	(Belgium) Ysaline Bonaventure (United Kingdom) Naomi Broady	6–2, 6–0
Win	16–11	Sep 2017	Neva Cup St. Petersburg, Russia	100,000	Hard (i)	(Russia) Anna Blinkova	(Switzerland) Belinda Bencic (Slovakia) Michaela Hončová	6–3, 6–1

== Team competitions ==
=== Fed Cup/Billie Jean King Cup ===
Legend
World Group / Finals (3–1)
Finals Qualifying Round (0–2)
World Group 2 (0–1)

==== Singles (0–3) ====
Edition	Round	Date	Location	Against	Surface	Opponent	W/L	Score
2014	WG QF	Feb 2014	Hobart (AUS)	Australia	Hard	Samantha Stosur	L	4–6, 0–6
2020–21	F QR	Feb 2020	Cluj-Napoca (ROU)	Romania	Hard (i)	Ana Bogdan	L	3–6, 7–6^{(7–5)}, 1–6
2020–21	F QR	Feb 2020	Cluj-Napoca (ROU)	Romania	Hard (i)	Jaqueline Cristian	L	5–7, 3–6

==== Doubles (3–1) ====
Edition	Round	Date	Location	Against	Surface	Partner	Opponent	W/L	Score
2018	WG2	Feb 2018	Bratislava (SVK)	Slovakia	Hard (i)	Anna Kalinskaya	Jana Čepelová; Anna Karolína Schmiedlová	L	3–6, 2–6
2020–21	F RR	Nov 2021	Prague (CZE)	Canada	Hard (i)	Liudmila Samsonova	Gabriela Dabrowski; Rebecca Marino	W	6–3, 6–1
2020–21	F RR	Nov 2021	Prague (CZE)	France	Hard (i)	Liudmila Samsonova	Clara Burel; Alizé Cornet	W	6–2, 6–1
2020–21	F SF	Nov 2021	Prague (CZE)	United States	Hard (i)	Liudmila Samsonova	Shelby Rogers; CoCo Vandeweghe	W	6–3, 6–3

== WTA Tour career earnings ==
Current after the 2023 Abu Dhabi Open.

Year	Grand Slam titles (Note: Includes singles, doubles and mixed doubles titles.)	WTA titles	Total titles	Earnings ($)	Money list rank
2014	0	0	0	16,786	352
2015	0	0	0	10,751	489
2016	0	0	0	33,114	301
2017	0	0	0	91,304	209
2018	0	0	0	167,256	174
2019	0	1	1	843,932	46
2020	0	0	0	481,231	44
2021	0	2	2	1,170,869	26
2022	0	3	3	2,070,680	13
2023	0	0	0	188,610	35
Career	0	6	6	5,106,696	132

== Career Grand Slam statistics ==
The tournaments won by Kudermetova are in boldface, and advanced into finals by Kudermetova are in italics.

=== Seedings ===
==== Singles ====
Year	Australian Open	French Open	Wimbledon	US Open
2017	did not qualify	did not qualify	did not qualify	did not qualify
2018	absent	did not qualify	did not qualify	did not qualify
2019	qualifier	not seeded	not seeded	not seeded
2020	not seeded	not seeded	cancelled	29th
2021	32nd	29th	29th	29th
2022	28th	29th	absent/expelled	18th
2023	9th	11th	12th	16th

==== Doubles ====
Year	Australian Open	French Open	Wimbledon	US Open
2017	absent	alternative	qualifier	not seeded
2018	not seeded	not seeded	not seeded	not seeded
2019	not seeded	not seeded	14th	15th
2020	13th	8th	cancelled	not seeded
2021	15th	not seeded	protected ranking (1)	6th
2022	3rd	2nd	absent/expelled	1st
2023	not seeded	15th		

=== Best Grand Slam results details ===
Grand Slam winners are in boldface, and runner–ups are in italics.

==== Singles ====
**Australian Open**
**2021 (32nd)**
Round	Opponent	Rank	Score
1R	(Ukraine) Marta Kostyuk	78	6–2, 7–6^{(7–5)}
2R	(Russia) Varvara Gracheva	97	5–7, 6–2, 6–2
3R	(Romania) Simona Halep (2)	2	1–6, 3–6
**2022 (28th)**
Round	Opponent	Rank	Score
1R	(United States) Claire Liu	93	6–4, 6–4
2R	(Romania) Elena-Gabriela Ruse	72	6–2, 7–5
3R	(Greece) Maria Sakkari (5)	8	4–6, 1–6

**Wimbledon Championships**
**2019 (not seeded)**
Round	Opponent	Rank	Score
1R	(Belgium) Ysaline Bonaventure (Q)	114	6–2, 6–4
2R	(Denmark) Caroline Wozniacki (14)	19	6–7^{(5–7)}, 3–6

**French Open**
**2022 (29th)**
Round	Opponent	Rank	Score
1R	(China) Zhu Lin (Q)	99	6–4, 3–6, 6–3
2R	(Serbia) Aleksandra Krunić (Q)	114	6–3, 6–3
3R	(Spain) Paula Badosa (3)	4	6–3, 2–1 ret.
4R	(United States) Madison Keys (22)	22	1–6, 6–3, 6–1
QF	Daria Kasatkina (20)	20	4–6, 6–7^{(5–7)}

**US Open**
**2022 (18th)**
Round	Opponent	Rank	Score
1R	(Croatia) Donna Vekić	84	7–5, 6–3
2R	(Belgium) Maryna Zanevska	97	6–2, 6–3
3R	(Hungary) Dalma Gálfi	91	6–2, 6–0
4R	(Tunisia) Ons Jabeur (5)	5	6–7^{(1–7)}, 4–6

== Head-to-head records ==
=== Record against top 10 players ===
- Kudermetova has a 16–17 record against players who were, at the time the match was played, ranked in the top 10.

#	Player	Rank	Event	Surface	Rd	Score	KRk	Ref
2019
1.	(Switzerland) Belinda Bencic	10	Wuhan Open, China	Hard	2R	2–6, 6–3, 6–4	45	
2.	(Ukraine) Elina Svitolina	4	Kremlin Cup, Russia	Hard (i)	2R	6–2, 1–6, 7–5	42	
2020
3.	(Czech Republic) Karolína Plíšková	3	Cincinnati Open, US	Hard	2R	7–5, 6–4	41	
4.	(Czech Republic) Karolína Plíšková	6	Ostrava Open, Czech Republic	Hard (i)	2R	4–6, 6–4, 6–3	45	
2021
5.	(Ukraine) Elina Svitolina	5	Abu Dhabi Open, UAE	Hard	QF	5–7, 6–3, 7–6^{(7–3)}	46	
6.	(Netherlands) Kiki Bertens	10	Madrid Open, Spain	Clay	2R	6–4, 6–3	28	
2022
7.	(Spain) Garbiñe Muguruza	7	Dubai Championships, UAE	Hard	2R	3–6, 6–4, 6–4	31	
8.	(Spain) Paula Badosa	4	French Open, France	Clay	3R	6–3, 2–1 ret.	29	
9.	Aryna Sabalenka	5	German Open, Germany	Grass	1R	2–6, 7–5, 6–4	24	
10.	(Tunisia) Ons Jabeur	5	Silicon Valley Classic, US	Hard	QF	7–6^{(7–5)}, 6–2	19	
2023
11.	(United States) Coco Gauff	6	Qatar Open, Qatar	Hard	QF	6–2, 3–6, 6–1	11	
12.	Daria Kasatkina	8	Madrid Open, Spain	Clay	4R	7–5, 1–6, 7–6^{(7–2)}	13	
13.	(United States) Jessica Pegula	3	Madrid Open, Spain	Clay	QF	6–4, 0–6, 6–4	13	
14.	Aryna Sabalenka	2	German Open, Germany	Grass	2R	6–2, 7–6^{(7–2)}	13	
15.	(Poland) Iga Świątek	2	Pan Pacific Open, Japan	Hard	QF	6–2, 2–6, 6–4	19	
16.	(United States) Jessica Pegula	4	Pan Pacific Open, Japan	Hard	F	7–5, 6–1	19	

=== Double bagel matches ===
Result	Year	W–L	Tournament	Tier	Surface	Opponent	Rank	Rd	Rank
Win	2014	1–0	ITF Namangan, Uzbekistan	25,000	Hard	(Ukraine) Alisa Tymofeyeva	n/a	Q1	No. 513
Win	2015	2–0	ITF Namangan, Uzbekistan	25,000	Hard	(Uzbekistan) Gulchekhra Mukhammadsidikova	n/a	1R	No. 342
Win	2020	3–0	Linz Open, Austria	International	Hard (i)	(Austria) Barbara Haas	No. 148	1R	No. 46
Loss	2025	3–1	Abu Dhabi Open, UAE	WTA 500	Hard	(Switzerland) Belinda Bencic	No. 157	2R	No. 52

=== Win without dropping a single game ===
Result	Year	Tournament	Tier	Surface	Opponent	Rank	Rd	Rank	Score
Win	2019	Tianjin Open, China	International	Hard	(China) Zheng Saisai	No. 38	2R	No. 45	5–0 ret.

== Awards ==
- The Russian Cup in the nominations:
  - Team of the Year – Girls Under-14: 2011;
  - Team of the Year – Girls Under-16: 2013;
  - Olympians-2020;
  - Team of the Year: 2021.
