= 2021 İstanbul Cup – Singles =

Singles
- 2021 İstanbul Cup

Final
- Champion: (Romania) Sorana Cîrstea
- Runner-up: (Belgium) Elise Mertens
- Score: 6–1, 7–6^{(7–3)}

Details
- Draw: 32 (6 Q / 4 WC)
- Seeds: 8

Events
Singles	Doubles
- İstanbul Cup

Sorana Cîrstea defeated Elise Mertens in the final, 6–1, 7–6^{(7–3)} to win the women's singles tennis title at the 2021 İstanbul Cup. This was Cîrstea's first title since 2008. Cîrstea did not drop a set throughout the tournament.

Patricia Maria Țig was the defending champion, but she chose not to participate this year.

== Seeds ==
1. (Belgium) Elise Mertens (final)
2. (Croatia) Petra Martić (first round)
3. (Russia) Veronika Kudermetova (semifinals)
4. (Russia) Daria Kasatkina (second round)
5. (Czech Republic) Barbora Krejčíková (second round)
6. (Russia) Anastasia Pavlyuchenkova (first round)
7. (China) Zheng Saisai (withdrew)
8. (China) Wang Qiang (second round)

== Draw ==
Key

- Q = Qualifier
- WC = Wild card
- LL = Lucky loser
- Alt = Alternate
- ITF = ITF entry
- PR = Protected ranking
- SR = Special ranking
- SE = Special exempt
- JE = Junior exempt
- JR = Junior Accelerator Programme entrant
- CO = College Accelerator Programme entrant
- NG = Next Gen Accelerator Program entrant
- w/o = Walkover
- r = Retired
- d = Defaulted

=== Finals ===
Semifinals
1/WC	(Belgium) Elise Mertens	6	6
3	(Russia) Veronika Kudermetova	1	4
(Ukraine) Marta Kostyuk	4	4
(Romania) Sorana Cîrstea	6	6

Final
1/WC	(Belgium) Elise Mertens	1	6^{3}
(Romania) Sorana Cîrstea	6	7^{7}

=== Top half ===
First round
1/WC	(Belgium) E Mertens	6	6
Q	(Spain) L Arruabarrena	2	0
Q	(Spain) N Párrizas Díaz	4	6	3
(Switzerland) V Golubic	6	2	6
(Czech Republic) K Siniaková	7^{7}	3	6
Q	(Spain) C Bucșa	6^{5}	6	3
(France) K Mladenovic	6	6
LL	(Austria) B Haas	4	3
3	(Russia) V Kudermetova	6	3	7^{7}
(United States) B Pera	4	6	6^{4}
(Kazakhstan) Z Diyas	4	4
(Estonia) K Kanepi	6	6
(Japan) N Hibino	3	3
(Romania) A Bogdan	6	6
WC	(Turkey) Ç Büyükakçay	7^{10}	2	0
5	(Czech Republic) B Krejčíková	6^{8}	6	6

Second round
1/WC	(Belgium) E Mertens	6	4	6
(Switzerland) V Golubic	4	6	1
(Czech Republic) K Siniaková	6	3	6
(France) K Mladenovic	4	6	4
3	(Russia) V Kudermetova	6	6
(Estonia) K Kanepi	4	3
(Romania) A Bogdan	6	6
5	(Czech Republic) B Krejčíková	3	3

Quarterfinals
1/WC	(Belgium) E Mertens	6	6
(Czech Republic) K Siniaková	4	4
3	(Russia) V Kudermetova	2	6	6
(Romania) A Bogdan	6	3	3

Semifinals
1/WC	(Belgium) E Mertens	6	6
3	(Russia) V Kudermetova	1	4

=== Bottom half ===
First round
8	(China) Q Wang	4	6	6
Q	(Russia) A Gasanova	6	1	2
WC	(Croatia) A Konjuh	7	6
(Italy) S Errani	5	2
Q	(Russia) K Rakhimova	4	3
(Ukraine) M Kostyuk	6	6
Q	(Croatia) T Mrdeža	1	0
4	(Russia) D Kasatkina	6	6
6	(Russia) A Pavlyuchenkova	6^{2}	7^{10}	4
(Russia) A Potapova	7^{7}	6^{8}	6
(Ukraine) K Kozlova	4	6^{6}
(Romania) S Cîrstea	6	7^{8}
WC	(Russia) V Zvonareva	6	6
(Slovenia) P Hercog	3	3
(France) F Ferro	7	6
2	(Croatia) P Martić	5	2

Second round
8	(China) Q Wang	1	4
WC	(Croatia) A Konjuh	6	6
(Ukraine) M Kostyuk	6	7
4	(Russia) D Kasatkina	3	5
(Russia) A Potapova	6^{6}	4
(Romania) S Cîrstea	7^{8}	6
WC	(Russia) V Zvonareva	3	3
(France) F Ferro	6	6

Quarterfinals
WC	(Croatia) A Konjuh	5	6	3
(Ukraine) M Kostyuk	7	4	6
(Romania) S Cîrstea	6	0
(France) F Ferro	4	0^{r}

Semifinals
(Ukraine) M Kostyuk	4	4
(Romania) S Cîrstea	6	6

== Qualifying ==
=== Seeds ===
1. (France) Océane Dodin (first round)
2. (Russia) Kamilla Rakhimova (qualified)
3. (Romania) Jaqueline Cristian (qualifying competition)
4. (Switzerland) Leonie Küng (first round)
5. (Austria) Barbara Haas (qualifying competition, lucky loser)
6. (France) Harmony Tan (qualifying competition)
7. (Spain) Nuria Párrizas Díaz (qualified)
8. (Spain) Cristina Bucșa (qualified)
9. (Spain) Lara Arruabarrena (qualified)
10. (Russia) Anastasia Gasanova (qualified)
11. (Georgia (country)) Mariam Bolkvadze (qualifying competition)
12. (Chinese Taipei) Liang En-shuo (first round)

=== Qualifiers ===
1. (Croatia) Tereza Mrdeža
2. (Russia) Kamilla Rakhimova
3. (Spain) Cristina Bucșa
4. (Russia) Anastasia Gasanova
5. (Spain) Nuria Párrizas Díaz
6. (Spain) Lara Arruabarrena

=== Lucky loser ===
1. (Austria) Barbara Haas

=== Draw ===
==== First qualifier ====
First round
1	(France) Océane Dodin	6^{3}	6	0
(Croatia) Tereza Mrdeža	7^{7}	3	6
(Spain) Irene Burillo Escorihuela	6	6
12	(Chinese Taipei) Liang En-shuo	1	4

Qualifying competition
(Croatia) Tereza Mrdeža	6	6
(Spain) Irene Burillo Escorihuela	4	2

==== Second qualifier ====
First round
2	(Russia) Kamilla Rakhimova	6	1	6
(France) Tessah Andrianjafitrimo	2	6	1
(Belarus) Yuliya Hatouka	4	4
11	(Georgia (country)) Mariam Bolkvadze	6	6

Qualifying competition
2	(Russia) Kamilla Rakhimova	6	6
11	(Georgia (country)) Mariam Bolkvadze	4	3

==== Third qualifier ====
First round
3	(Romania) Jaqueline Cristian	6	6
(Turkey) Pemra Özgen	4	3
(Slovenia) Dalila Jakupović	1	2
8	(Spain) Cristina Bucșa	6	6

Qualifying competition
3	(Romania) Jaqueline Cristian	1	3
8	(Spain) Cristina Bucșa	6	6

==== Fourth qualifier ====
First round
4	(Switzerland) Leonie Küng	3	6	3
WC	(Czech Republic) Nikola Bartůňková	6	4	6
(Romania) Irina Fetecău	2	3
10	(Russia) Anastasia Gasanova	6	6

Qualifying competition
WC	(Czech Republic) Nikola Bartůňková	4	7	3
10	(Russia) Anastasia Gasanova	6	5	6

==== Fifth qualifier ====
First round
5	(Austria) Barbara Haas	6	7
WC	(Turkey) Zeynep Sönmez	3	5
WC	(Turkey) İpek Öz	3	4
7	(Spain) Nuria Párrizas Díaz	6	6

Qualifying competition
5	(Austria) Barbara Haas	6	1	0
7	(Spain) Nuria Párrizas Díaz	2	6	6

==== Sixth qualifier ====
First round
6	(France) Harmony Tan	6^{1}	6	6
(Hungary) Dalma Gálfi	7^{7}	3	1
WC	(Turkey) Berfu Cengiz	5	3
9	(Spain) Lara Arruabarrena	7	6

Qualifying competition
6	(France) Harmony Tan	3	3
9	(Spain) Lara Arruabarrena	6	6
