= 2025 WTA Finals – Doubles =

Doubles
- 2025 WTA Finals

Final
- Champions: Veronika Kudermetova (Belgium) Elise Mertens
- Runners-up: (Hungary) Tímea Babos (Brazil) Luisa Stefani
- Score: 7–6^{(7–4)}, 6–1

Details
- Draw: 8 (round robin + elimination)
- Seeds: 8

Events
Singles	Doubles
← 2024 ·	WTA Finals	· 2026 →

Veronika Kudermetova and Elise Mertens defeated Tímea Babos and Luisa Stefani in the final, 7–6^{(7–4)}, 6–1 to win the doubles tennis title at the 2025 WTA Finals. It was their second WTA Finals title as a pair, after 2022. They saved a match point en route to the title, in the semifinals against Kateřina Siniaková and Taylor Townsend.

Gabriela Dabrowski and Erin Routliffe were the defending champions, but were eliminated in the round-robin stage.

Mirra Andreeva, Diana Shnaider, Luisa Stefani and Asia Muhammad made their debuts in the doubles competition. As in the previous year, Jasmine Paolini was the only player to qualify for both the singles and doubles tournaments.

Siniaková attained the individual year-end WTA No. 1 doubles ranking for a record-equaling fifth time after Sara Errani and Paolini lost their second round-robin match. Errani was vying for the Career Super Slam in women's doubles, but was eliminated in the round-robin stage.

== Seeds ==
1. (Italy) Sara Errani / (Italy) Jasmine Paolini (round robin)
2. (Czech Republic) Kateřina Siniaková / (United States) Taylor Townsend (semifinals)
3. (Canada) Gabriela Dabrowski / (New Zealand) Erin Routliffe (round robin)
4. Veronika Kudermetova / (Belgium) Elise Mertens (champions)
5. Mirra Andreeva / Diana Shnaider (round robin)
6. (Chinese Taipei) Hsieh Su-wei / (Latvia) Jeļena Ostapenko (semifinals)
7. (Hungary) Tímea Babos / (Brazil) Luisa Stefani (final)
8. (United States) Asia Muhammad / (Netherlands) Demi Schuurs (round robin)

== Alternates ==
1. (Kazakhstan) Anna Danilina / (Serbia) Aleksandra Krunić (did not play)
2. (China) Guo Hanyu / Alexandra Panova (did not play)

== Draw ==
Key

- Q = Qualifier
- WC = Wild card
- LL = Lucky loser
- Alt = Alternate
- ITF = ITF entry
- PR = Protected ranking
- SR = Special ranking
- SE = Special exempt
- JE = Junior exempt
- JR = Junior Accelerator Programme entrant
- CO = College Accelerator Programme entrant
- NG = Next Gen Accelerator Program entrant
- w/o = Walkover
- r = Retired
- d = Defaulted

=== Finals ===
Semifinals
6	(Chinese Taipei) Hsieh Su-wei (Latvia) Jeļena Ostapenko	4	6^{5}
7	(Hungary) Tímea Babos (Brazil) Luisa Stefani	6	7^{7}
4	Veronika Kudermetova (Belgium) Elise Mertens	4	7^{8}	[10]
2	(Czech Republic) Kateřina Siniaková (United States) Taylor Townsend	6	6^{6}	[6]

Final
7	(Hungary) Tímea Babos (Brazil) Luisa Stefani	6^{4}	1
4	Veronika Kudermetova (Belgium) Elise Mertens	7^{7}	6

=== Martina Navratilova Group ===
		(Italy) Errani (Italy) Paolini	Kudermetova (Belgium) Mertens	(Chinese Taipei) Hsieh (Latvia) Ostapenko	(United States) Muhammad (Netherlands) Schuurs	RR; W–L	Set; W–L	Game; W–L	Standings
1	(Italy) Sara Errani (Italy) Jasmine Paolini		3–6, 3–6	3–6, 4–6	6–3, 6–3	1–2	2–4 (33%)	25–30 (45%)	3
4	Veronika Kudermetova (Belgium) Elise Mertens	6–3, 6–3		6–1, 5–7, [5–10]	6–4, 6–7^{(6–8)}, [10–6]	2–1	5–3 (63%)	36–26 (58%)	2
6	(Chinese Taipei) Hsieh Su-wei (Latvia) Jeļena Ostapenko	6–3, 6–4	1–6, 7–5, [10–5]		6–3, 6–1	3–0	6–1 (86%)	33–22 (60%)	1
8	(United States) Asia Muhammad (Netherlands) Demi Schuurs	3–6, 3–6	4–6, 7–6^{(8–6)}, [6–10]	3–6, 1–6		0–3	1–6 (14%)	21–37 (36%)	4

=== Liezel Huber Group ===
		(Czech Republic) Siniaková (United States) Townsend	(Canada) Dabrowski (New Zealand) Routliffe	Andreeva; Shnaider	(Hungary) Babos (Brazil) Stefani	RR; W–L	Set; W–L	Game; W–L	Standings
2	(Czech Republic) Kateřina Siniaková (United States) Taylor Townsend		6–4, 7–6^{(7–3)}	6–2, 6–4	6–2, 3–6, [10–6]	3–0	6–1 (86%)	35–24 (59%)	1
3	(Canada) Gabriela Dabrowski (New Zealand) Erin Routliffe	4–6, 6–7^{(3–7)}		6–3, 7–6^{(7–2)}	6–2, 5–7, [5–10]	1–2	3–4 (43%)	34–32 (52%)	3
5	Mirra Andreeva; Diana Shnaider	2–6, 4–6	3–6, 6–7^{(2–7)}		5–7, 6–2, [7–10]	0–3	1–6 (14%)	26–35 (43%)	4
7	(Hungary) Tímea Babos (Brazil) Luisa Stefani	2–6, 6–3, [6–10]	2–6, 7–5, [10–5]	7–5, 2–6, [10–7]		2–1	5–4 (56%)	28–32 (47%)	2

Standings are determined by: 1. number of wins; 2. number of matches; 3. in two-team ties, head-to-head records; 4. in three-team ties, (a) percentage of sets won (head-to-head records if two teams remain tied), then (b) percentage of games won (head-to-head records if two teams remain tied), then (c) WTA rankings.
