= 2021 İstanbul Cup =

- Date: 19–25 April
- Edition: 14th
- Category: WTA International
- Draw: 32S / 16D
- Prize money: $235,238
- Surface: Clay
- Location: Istanbul, Turkey
- Venue: Istanbul Tennis Center

Champions

Singles
- (Romania) Sorana Cîrstea

Doubles
- (Russia) Veronika Kudermetova / (Belgium) Elise Mertens
- İstanbul Cup

The 2021 İstanbul Cup (also known as the TEB BNP Paribas Tennis Championship İstanbul for sponsorship reasons) was a women's tennis tournament played on outdoor clay courts. It is the 14th edition of the İstanbul Cup, and part of the WTA International tournaments of the 2021 WTA Tour. It took place in Istanbul, Turkey, from 19 through 25 April 2021. Unseeded Sorana Cîrstea won the singles title.

== Finals ==
=== Singles ===
- (Romania) Sorana Cîrstea defeated (Belgium) Elise Mertens, 6–1, 7–6^{(7–3)}

=== Doubles ===
- (Russia) Veronika Kudermetova / (Belgium) Elise Mertens defeated (Japan) Nao Hibino / (Japan) Makoto Ninomiya, 6–1, 6–1

== Points and prize money ==
Event	W	F	SF	QF	Round of 16	Round of 32	Q	Q2	Q1
Singles	280	180	110	60	30	1	18	12	1
Doubles	280	180	110	60	1	—N/a	—N/a	—N/a	—N/a

=== Prize money ===
Event	W	F	SF	QF	Round of 16	Round of 32	Q2	Q1
Singles	$29,200	$16,398	$10,100	$5,800	$3,675	$2,675	$1,950	$1,270
Doubles	$10,300	$6,000	$3,800	$2,300	$1,750	—N/a	—N/a	—N/a

== Singles main-draw entrants ==
=== Seeds ===
Country	Player	Rank^{1}	Seed
BEL	Elise Mertens	17	1
CRO	Petra Martić	21	2
RUS	Veronika Kudermetova	29	3
RUS	Daria Kasatkina	37	4
CZE	Barbora Krejčíková	38	5
RUS	Anastasia Pavlyuchenkova	40	6
~~CHN~~	~~Zheng Saisai~~	~~49~~	~~7~~
CHN	Wang Qiang	50	8

- Rankings are as of April 12, 2021.

=== Other entrants ===
The following players received wildcards into the singles main draw:

- (Turkey) Çağla Büyükakçay
- (Croatia) Ana Konjuh
- (Belgium) Elise Mertens
- (Russia) Vera Zvonareva

The following players received entry from the qualifying draw:

- (Spain) Lara Arruabarrena
- (Spain) Cristina Bucșa
- (Russia) Anastasia Gasanova
- (Croatia) Tereza Mrdeža
- (Spain) Nuria Párrizas Díaz
- (Russia) Kamilla Rakhimova

The following player received entry as a lucky loser:

- (Austria) Barbara Haas

=== Withdrawals ===
Before the tournament

- (France) Alizé Cornet → replaced by (Kazakhstan) Zarina Diyas
- (Russia) Svetlana Kuznetsova → replaced by (Czech Republic) Kateřina Siniaková
- (Poland) Magda Linette → replaced by (Japan) Nao Hibino
- (Kazakhstan) Yulia Putintseva → replaced by (Italy) Sara Errani
- (Latvia) Anastasija Sevastova → replaced by (Ukraine) Marta Kostyuk
- (Spain) Sara Sorribes Tormo → replaced by (Russia) Anastasia Potapova
- (Switzerland) Jil Teichmann → replaced by (Switzerland) Viktorija Golubic
- (Romania) Patricia Maria Țig → replaced by (Romania) Ana Bogdan
- (China) Zheng Saisai → replaced by (Austria) Barbara Haas

=== Retirements ===
- (France) Fiona Ferro

== Doubles main-draw entrants ==
=== Seeds ===
Country	Player	Country	Player	Rank^{1}	Seed
RUS	Veronika Kudermetova	BEL	Elise Mertens	31	1
JPN	Nao Hibino	JPN	Makoto Ninomiya	144	2
ESP	Lara Arruabarrena	CZE	Renata Voráčová	158	3
RUS	Anastasia Pavlyuchenkova	RUS	Anastasia Potapova	194	4

- ^{1} Rankings as of April 12, 2021.

=== Other entrants ===
The following pairs received wildcards into the doubles main draw:

- (Turkey) Çağla Büyükakçay / (Turkey) Pemra Özgen
- (Russia) Elena Vesnina / (Russia) Vera Zvonareva

The following pairs received entry using protected rankings:

- (Switzerland) Viktorija Golubic / (Russia) Alexandra Panova
- (Indonesia) Beatrice Gumulya / (Indonesia) Jessy Rompies

=== Withdrawals ===
Before the tournament

- (Netherlands) Arantxa Rus / (Slovenia) Tamara Zidanšek → replaced by (Indonesia) Beatrice Gumulya / (Indonesia) Jessy Rompies
