= 2021 İstanbul Cup – Doubles =

Doubles
- 2021 İstanbul Cup

Final
- Champions: (Russia) Veronika Kudermetova (Belgium) Elise Mertens
- Runners-up: (Japan) Nao Hibino (Japan) Makoto Ninomiya
- Score: 6–1, 6–1

Details
- Draw: 16
- Seeds: 4

Events
Singles	Doubles
- İstanbul Cup

Alexa Guarachi and Desirae Krawczyk were the defending champions, but Guarachi chose not to participate this year and Krawczyk chose to compete in Stuttgart instead.

The first-seeded team of Veronika Kudermetova and Elise Mertens won the title, defeating Nao Hibino and Makoto Ninomiya in the final, 6–1, 6–1.

== Seeds ==
1. (Russia) Veronika Kudermetova / (Belgium) Elise Mertens (champions)
2. (Japan) Nao Hibino / (Japan) Makoto Ninomiya (final)
3. (Spain) Lara Arruabarrena / (Czech Republic) Renata Voráčová (first round)
4. (Russia) Anastasia Pavlyuchenkova / (Russia) Anastasia Potapova (semifinals)

== Draw ==
Key

- Q = Qualifier
- WC = Wild card
- LL = Lucky loser
- Alt = Alternate
- ITF = ITF entry
- PR = Protected ranking
- SR = Special ranking
- SE = Special exempt
- JE = Junior exempt
- JR = Junior Accelerator Programme entrant
- CO = College Accelerator Programme entrant
- NG = Next Gen Accelerator Program entrant
- w/o = Walkover
- r = Retired
- d = Defaulted

=== Draw ===
First round
1	(Russia) V Kudermetova (Belgium) E Mertens	6	6
WC	(Turkey) Ç Büyükakçay (Turkey) P Özgen	2	2
(Kazakhstan) A Danilina (Russia) K Rakhimova	3	6	[6]
(Slovenia) D Jakupović (Russia) Y Sizikova	6	3	[10]
4	(Russia) A Pavlyuchenkova (Russia) A Potapova	5	6	[10]
(Austria) B Haas (China) Q Wang	7	3	[3]
(Japan) M Kato (Poland) K Piter	4	6	[5]
PR	(Switzerland) V Golubic (Russia) A Panova	6	4	[10]
(United Kingdom) N Broady (France) E Lechemia	0	3
(Belarus) L Marozava (Romania) A Mitu	6	6
(Poland) P Kania-Choduń (Germany) J Wachaczyk	6	6
3	(Spain) L Arruabarrena (Czech Republic) R Voráčová	2	2
(Chinese Taipei) E-s Liang (China) S Zheng	2	7	[8]
WC	(Russia) E Vesnina (Russia) V Zvonareva	6	5	[10]
PR	(Indonesia) B Gumulya (Indonesia) J Rompies	2	2
2	(Japan) N Hibino (Japan) M Ninomiya	6	6

Quarterfinals
1	(Russia) V Kudermetova (Belgium) E Mertens	6	4	[10]
(Slovenia) D Jakupović (Russia) Y Sizikova	4	6	[8]
4	(Russia) A Pavlyuchenkova (Russia) A Potapova	7	6
PR	(Switzerland) V Golubic (Russia) A Panova	5	3
(Belarus) L Marozava (Romania) A Mitu	6	1	[3]
(Poland) P Kania-Choduń (Germany) J Wachaczyk	2	6	[10]
WC	(Russia) E Vesnina (Russia) V Zvonareva	3	1
2	(Japan) N Hibino (Japan) M Ninomiya	6	6

Semifinals
1	(Russia) V Kudermetova (Belgium) E Mertens	6	6
4	(Russia) A Pavlyuchenkova (Russia) A Potapova	3	1
(Poland) P Kania-Choduń (Germany) J Wachaczyk	3	2
2	(Japan) N Hibino (Japan) M Ninomiya	6	6

Final
1	(Russia) V Kudermetova (Belgium) E Mertens	6	6
2	(Japan) N Hibino (Japan) M Ninomiya	1	1
