= 2020 Upper Austria Ladies Linz – Singles =

Singles
- 2020 Upper Austria Ladies Linz

Final
- Champion: (Belarus) Aryna Sabalenka
- Runner-up: (Belgium) Elise Mertens
- Score: 7–5, 6–2

Details
- Draw: 32
- Seeds: 8

Events
Singles	Doubles
← 2019 ·	Linz Open	· 2021 →

Coco Gauff was the defending champion, but chose not to participate this year.

Aryna Sabalenka won the title, defeating her doubles partner Elise Mertens in the final, 7–5, 6–2.

== Seeds ==
1. (Belarus) Aryna Sabalenka (champion)
2. (Belgium) Elise Mertens (final)
3. (Ukraine) Dayana Yastremska (first round)
4. (Russia) Ekaterina Alexandrova (semifinals)
5. (Russia) Veronika Kudermetova (quarterfinals)
6. (Argentina) Nadia Podoroska (quarterfinals)
7. (Switzerland) Jil Teichmann (first round)
8. (United States) Bernarda Pera (first round)

== Draw ==
=== Key ===
- Q = Qualifier
- WC = Wild card
- LL = Lucky loser
- Alt = Alternate
- SE = Special exempt
- PR = Protected ranking
- ITF = ITF entry
- JE = Junior exempt
- w/o = Walkover
- r = Retired
- d = Defaulted
- SR = Special ranking

=== Finals ===
Semifinals
1	(Belarus) Aryna Sabalenka	7	4	6
(Czech Republic) Barbora Krejčíková	5	6	3
4	(Russia) Ekaterina Alexandrova	6	1	5
2	(Belgium) Elise Mertens	2	6	7

Final
1	(Belarus) Aryna Sabalenka	7	6
2	(Belgium) Elise Mertens	5	2

=== Top half ===
First round
1	(Belarus) A Sabalenka	6	6
(Italy) J Paolini	4	4
(Slovakia) V Kužmová	6^{3}	3
Q	(Switzerland) S Vögele	7^{7}	6
(Romania) S Cîrstea	2
WC	(Austria) J Grabher	3^{r}
Q	(France) O Dodin	1	6	6
7	(Switzerland) J Teichmann	6	4	2
3	(Ukraine) D Yastremska	4	3
(Belgium) G Minnen	6	6
Q	(France) H Tan	3	7	2
(Czech Republic) B Krejčíková	6	5	6
Q	(Croatia) J Fett	6	3
Q	(Czech Republic) T Martincová	2	1^{r}
(Belarus) A Sasnovich	6	6
8	(United States) B Pera	3	1

Second round
1	(Belarus) A Sabalenka	6	6
Q	(Switzerland) S Vögele	0	3
(Romania) S Cîrstea	4	4
Q	(France) O Dodin	6	6
(Belgium) G Minnen	7	6^{7}	4
(Czech Republic) B Krejčíková	5	7^{9}	6
Q	(Croatia) J Fett	6	1	3
(Belarus) A Sasnovich	3	6	6

Quarterfinals
1	(Belarus) A Sabalenka	6	3
Q	(France) O Dodin	3	3^{r}
(Czech Republic) B Krejčíková	6	6
(Belarus) A Sasnovich	3	1

Semifinals
1	(Belarus) A Sabalenka	7	4	6
(Czech Republic) B Krejčíková	5	6	3

=== Bottom half ===
First round
6	(Argentina) N Podoroska	6	6
(Romania) I-C Begu	4	4
(Italy) C Giorgi	6	5	6
(Spain) S Sorribes Tormo	3	7	4
(Russia) V Gracheva	6	7
LL	(Ukraine) K Zavatska	4	5
(Czech Republic) K Siniaková	3	4
4	(Russia) E Alexandrova	6	6
5	(Russia) V Kudermetova	6	6
WC	(Austria) B Haas	0	0
(Netherlands) A Rus	6	6
(Slovenia) T Zidanšek	4	4
WC	(Russia) V Zvonareva	6	6
(Ukraine) M Kostyuk	4	2
Q	(Ukraine) A Kalinina	6	1	2
2	(Belgium) E Mertens	2	6	6

Second round
6	(Argentina) N Podoroska	6^{4}	6	6
(Italy) C Giorgi	7^{7}	1	4
(Russia) V Gracheva	5	1
4	(Russia) E Alexandrova	7	6
5	(Russia) V Kudermetova	6	1	6
(Netherlands) A Rus	4	6	3
WC	(Russia) V Zvonareva	4	7	2
2	(Belgium) E Mertens	6	5	6

Quarterfinals
6	(Argentina) N Podoroska	2	1
4	(Russia) E Alexandrova	6	6
5	(Russia) V Kudermetova	4	1
2	(Belgium) E Mertens	6	6

Semifinals
4	(Russia) E Alexandrova	6	1	5
2	(Belgium) E Mertens	2	6	7

== Qualifying ==
=== Seeds ===
1. (France) Océane Dodin (qualified)
2. (Romania) Irina Bara (qualifying competition)
3. (Ukraine) Katarina Zavatska (qualifying competition, retired, lucky loser)
4. (Czech Republic) Tereza Martincová (qualified)
5. (Switzerland) Stefanie Vögele (qualified)
6. (Russia) Kamilla Rakhimova (first round)
7. (Ukraine) Anhelina Kalinina (qualified)
8. (Romania) Jaqueline Cristian (qualifying competition, retired)
9. (Netherlands) Lesley Pattinama Kerkhove (qualifying competition)
10. (Japan) Mayo Hibi (first round)
11. (Romania) Laura Ioana Paar (qualifying competition)
12. (Netherlands) Bibiane Schoofs (first round)

=== Qualifiers ===
1. (France) Océane Dodin
2. (Croatia) Jana Fett
3. (Ukraine) Anhelina Kalinina
4. (Czech Republic) Tereza Martincová
5. (Switzerland) Stefanie Vögele
6. (France) Harmony Tan

=== Lucky loser ===
1. (Ukraine) Katarina Zavatska

=== Draw ===
==== First qualifier ====
First round
1	(France) Océane Dodin	6	6
(Hungary) Réka Luca Jani	0	0
(Slovakia) Rebecca Šramková	7	5	0^{r}
11	(Romania) Laura Ioana Paar	5	7	2

Qualifying competition
1	(France) Océane Dodin	6	7
11	(Romania) Laura Ioana Paar	2	5

==== Second qualifier ====
First round
2	(Romania) Irina Bara	2	6	6
(Germany) Katharina Gerlach	6	3	4
(Croatia) Jana Fett	6	6
10	(Japan) Mayo Hibi	2	3

Qualifying competition
2	(Romania) Irina Bara	1	6	2
(Croatia) Jana Fett	6	4	6

==== Third qualifier ====
First round
3	(Ukraine) Katarina Zavatska	6^{3}	6	6
WC	(Croatia) Ana Konjuh	7^{7}	4	2
(Bulgaria) Isabella Shinikova	6	3	3
7	(Ukraine) Anhelina Kalinina	2	6	6

Qualifying competition
3	(Ukraine) Katarina Zavatska	0	0^{r}
7	(Ukraine) Anhelina Kalinina	6	4

==== Fourth qualifier ====
First round
4	(Czech Republic) Tereza Martincová	6	4	6
(United Kingdom) Jodie Burrage	3	6	3
WC	(Germany) Sabine Lisicki	7	6
12	(Netherlands) Bibiane Schoofs	5	3

Qualifying competition
4	(Czech Republic) Tereza Martincová	6	1	6
WC	(Germany) Sabine Lisicki	2	6	3

==== Fifth qualifier ====
First round
5	(Switzerland) Stefanie Vögele	6	6
WC	(Austria) Veronika Bokor	3	1
(Norway) Ulrikke Eikeri	6	1	5
9	(Netherlands) Lesley Pattinama Kerkhove	3	6	7

Qualifying competition
5	(Switzerland) Stefanie Vögele	6	3	6
9	(Netherlands) Lesley Pattinama Kerkhove	2	6	2

==== Sixth qualifier ====
First round
6	(Russia) Kamilla Rakhimova	2	2
(France) Harmony Tan	6	6
WC	(Austria) Mira Antonitsch	2	4
8	(Romania) Jaqueline Cristian	6	6

Qualifying competition
(France) Harmony Tan	4
8	(Romania) Jaqueline Cristian	1^{r}
