= 2024 WTA Finals – Doubles =

Doubles
- 2024 WTA Finals

Final
- Champions: (Canada) Gabriela Dabrowski (New Zealand) Erin Routliffe
- Runners-up: (Czech Republic) Kateřina Siniaková (United States) Taylor Townsend
- Score: 7–5, 6–3

Details
- Draw: 8 (round robin + elimination)
- Seeds: 8

Events
Singles	Doubles
← 2023 ·	WTA Finals	· 2025 →

Gabriela Dabrowski and Erin Routliffe defeated Kateřina Siniaková and Taylor Townsend in the final, 7–5, 6–3 to win the doubles tennis title at the 2024 WTA Finals. Dabrowski and Routliffe saved a match point in their round-robin match against Sara Errani and Jasmine Paolini, and became the first Canadian and New Zealand players, respectively, to win a WTA Finals title.

Laura Siegemund and Vera Zvonareva were the defending champions, but did not qualify this year.

Siniaková claimed the year-end individual WTA No. 1 doubles ranking after winning her first two round-robin matches.

Paolini, Townsend, and Caroline Dolehide made their debuts in the doubles competition at the WTA Finals. Paolini was the only player in this edition to qualify for both the singles and doubles tournaments.

Errani was trying to become the fifth woman to achieve the Career Super Slam in women's doubles, but she and Paolini were eliminated in the round-robin stage upon their loss to champions Dabrowski and Routliffe.

== Seeds ==
1. (Ukraine) Lyudmyla Kichenok / (Latvia) Jeļena Ostapenko (round robin)
2. (Canada) Gabriela Dabrowski / (New Zealand) Erin Routliffe (champions)
3. (Chinese Taipei) Hsieh Su-wei / (Belgium) Elise Mertens (round robin)
4. (Italy) Sara Errani / (Italy) Jasmine Paolini (round robin)
5. (United States) Caroline Dolehide / (United States) Desirae Krawczyk (round robin)
6. (United States) Nicole Melichar-Martinez / (Australia) Ellen Perez (semifinals)
7. (Chinese Taipei) Chan Hao-ching / Veronika Kudermetova (semifinals)
8. (Czech Republic) Kateřina Siniaková / (United States) Taylor Townsend (final)

== Alternates ==
1. (United States) Sofia Kenin / (United States) Bethanie Mattek-Sands (did not play)
2. (Netherlands) Demi Schuurs / (Brazil) Luisa Stefani (did not play)

== Draw ==
Key

- Q = Qualifier
- WC = Wild card
- LL = Lucky loser
- Alt = Alternate
- ITF = ITF entry
- PR = Protected ranking
- SR = Special ranking
- SE = Special exempt
- JE = Junior exempt
- JR = Junior Accelerator Programme entrant
- CO = College Accelerator Programme entrant
- NG = Next Gen Accelerator Program entrant
- w/o = Walkover
- r = Retired
- d = Defaulted

=== Finals ===
Semifinals
8	(Czech Republic) Kateřina Siniaková (United States) Taylor Townsend	6	7^{7}
7	(Chinese Taipei) Chan Hao-ching; Veronika Kudermetova	0	6^{5}
6	(United States) Nicole Melichar-Martinez (Australia) Ellen Perez	6^{7}	1
2	(Canada) Gabriela Dabrowski (New Zealand) Erin Routliffe	7^{9}	6

Final
8	(Czech Republic) Kateřina Siniaková (United States) Taylor Townsend	5	3
2	(Canada) Gabriela Dabrowski (New Zealand) Erin Routliffe	7	6

=== Green Group ===
		(Ukraine) Kichenok (Latvia) Ostapenko	(Chinese Taipei) Hsieh (Belgium) Mertens	(United States) Melichar-Martinez (Australia) Perez	(Czech Republic) Siniaková (United States) Townsend	RR; W–L	Set; W–L	Game; W–L	Standings
1	(Ukraine) Lyudmyla Kichenok (Latvia) Jeļena Ostapenko		1–6, 3–6	1–6, 3–6	6–3, 3–6, [9–11]	0–3	1–6 (14%)	17–34 (33.3%)	4
3	(Chinese Taipei) Hsieh Su-wei (Belgium) Elise Mertens	6–1, 6–3		6–1, 1–6, [6–10]	6–3, 3–6, [8–10]	1–2	4–4 (50%)	28–22 (56.0%)	3
6	(United States) Nicole Melichar-Martinez (Australia) Ellen Perez	6–1, 6–3	1–6, 6–1, [10–6]		2–6, 2–6	2–1	4–3 (57%)	24–23 (51.1%)	2
8	(Czech Republic) Kateřina Siniaková (United States) Taylor Townsend	3–6, 6–3, [11–9]	3–6, 6–3, [10–8]	6–2, 6–2		3–0	6–2 (75%)	32–22 (59.3%)	1

=== White Group ===
		(Canada) Dabrowski (New Zealand) Routliffe	(Italy) Errani (Italy) Paolini	(United States) Dolehide (United States) Krawczyk	(Chinese Taipei) Chan; Kudermetova	RR; W–L	Set; W–L	Game; W–L	Standings
2	(Canada) Gabriela Dabrowski (New Zealand) Erin Routliffe		1–6, 7–6^{(7–1)}, [11–9]	4–6, 6–3, [10–6]	7–6^{(8–6)}, 6–4	3–0	6–2 (75%)	33–31 (52%)	1
4	(Italy) Sara Errani (Italy) Jasmine Paolini	6–1, 6–7^{(1–7)}, [9–11]		1–6, 6–1, [10–4]	6–3, 6–7^{(3–7)}, [9–11]	1–2	4–5 (44%)	32–27 (54%)	3
5	(United States) Caroline Dolehide (United States) Desirae Krawczyk	6–4, 3–6, [6–10]	6–1, 1–6, [4–10]		6–3, 3–6, [7–10]	0–3	3–6 (33%)	25–29 (46%)	4
7	(Chinese Taipei) Chan Hao-ching; Veronika Kudermetova	6–7^{(6–8)}, 4–6	3–6, 7–6^{(7–3)}, [11–9]	3–6, 6–3, [10–7]		2–1	4–4 (50%)	31–34 (48%)	2

Standings are determined by: 1. number of wins; 2. number of matches; 3. in two-team ties, head-to-head records; 4. in three-team ties, (a) percentage of sets won (head-to-head records if two teams remain tied), then (b) percentage of games won (head-to-head records if two teams remain tied), then (c) WTA rankings.
