= 2022 WTA Finals – Doubles =

Doubles
- 2022 WTA Finals

Final
- Champions: Veronika Kudermetova (Belgium) Elise Mertens
- Runners-up: (Czech Republic) Barbora Krejčíková (Czech Republic) Kateřina Siniaková
- Score: 6–2, 4–6, [11–9]

Details
- Draw: 8 (round robin)

Events
Singles	Doubles
- WTA Finals

Veronika Kudermetova and Elise Mertens defeated the defending champions Barbora Krejčíková and Kateřina Siniaková in the final, 6–2, 4–6, [11–9] to win the doubles tennis title at the 2022 WTA Finals. Mertens became the first Belgian WTA Finals doubles champion.

Siniaková, Coco Gauff, and Kudermetova were in contention for the year-end individual No. 1 doubles ranking at the beginning of the tournament. Siniaková clinched the year-end top spot by virtue of winning two round robin matches.

== Seeds ==
1. (Czech Republic) Barbora Krejčíková / (Czech Republic) Kateřina Siniaková (final)
2. (Canada) Gabriela Dabrowski / (Mexico) Giuliana Olmos (round robin)
3. (United States) Coco Gauff / (United States) Jessica Pegula (round robin)
4. Veronika Kudermetova / (Belgium) Elise Mertens (champions)
5. (Ukraine) Lyudmyla Kichenok / (Latvia) Jeļena Ostapenko (semifinals)
6. (China) Xu Yifan / (China) Yang Zhaoxuan (round robin)
7. (Kazakhstan) Anna Danilina / (Brazil) Beatriz Haddad Maia (round robin)
8. (United States) Desirae Krawczyk / (Netherlands) Demi Schuurs (semifinals)

== Alternates ==
1. (United States) Nicole Melichar-Martinez / (Australia) Ellen Perez (did not play)
2. (France) Caroline Garcia / (France) Kristina Mladenovic (did not play)

== Draw ==
Key

- Q = Qualifier
- WC = Wild card
- LL = Lucky loser
- Alt = Alternate
- ITF = ITF entry
- PR = Protected ranking
- SR = Special ranking
- SE = Special exempt
- JE = Junior exempt
- JR = Junior Accelerator Programme entrant
- CO = College Accelerator Programme entrant
- NG = Next Gen Accelerator Program entrant
- w/o = Walkover
- r = Retired
- d = Defaulted

=== Finals ===
Semifinals
1	(Czech Republic) Barbora Krejčíková (Czech Republic) Kateřina Siniaková	7^{7}	6
5	(Ukraine) Lyudmyla Kichenok (Latvia) Jeļena Ostapenko	6^{5}	2
4	Veronika Kudermetova (Belgium) Elise Mertens	6	6
8	(United States) Desirae Krawczyk (Netherlands) Demi Schuurs	1	1

Final
1	(Czech Republic) Barbora Krejčíková (Czech Republic) Kateřina Siniaková	2	6	[9]
4	Veronika Kudermetova (Belgium) Elise Mertens	6	4	[11]

=== Group Rosie Casals ===
		(Czech Republic) Krejčíková (Czech Republic) Siniaková	(United States) Gauff (United States) Pegula	(China) Xu (China) Yang	(United States) Krawczyk (Netherlands) Schuurs	RR W–L	Set W–L	Game W–L	Standings
1	(Czech Republic) Barbora Krejčíková (Czech Republic) Kateřina Siniaková		6–2, 6–1	6–3, 6–3	6–4, 6–3	3–0	6–0 (100%)	36–16 (69%)	1
3	(United States) Coco Gauff (United States) Jessica Pegula	2–6, 1–6		4–6, 6–4, [7–10]	6–3, 0–6, [5–10]	0–3	2–6 (25%)	19–33 (37%)	4
6	(China) Xu Yifan (China) Yang Zhaoxuan	3–6, 3–6	6–4, 4–6, [10–7]		6–7^{(2–7)}, 3–6	1–2	2–5 (29%)	26–35 (43%)	3
8	(United States) Desirae Krawczyk (Netherlands) Demi Schuurs	4–6, 3–6	3–6, 6–0, [10–5]	7–6^{(7–2)}, 6–3		2–1	4–3 (57%)	30–27 (53%)	2

=== Group Pam Shriver ===
		(Canada) Dabrowski (Mexico) Olmos	Kudermetova (Belgium) Mertens	(Ukraine) Kichenok (Latvia) Ostapenko	(Kazakhstan) Danilina (Brazil) Haddad Maia	RR W–L	Set W–L	Game W–L	Standings
2	(Canada) Gabriela Dabrowski (Mexico) Giuliana Olmos		6–7^{(5–7)}, 2–6	7–6^{(7–5)}, 2–6, [12–10]	5–7, 0–6	1–2	2–5 (29%)	23–38 (38%)	4
4	Veronika Kudermetova (Belgium) Elise Mertens	7–6^{(7–5)}, 6–2		3–6, 6–1, [10–6]	6–4, 6–3	3–0	6–1 (86%)	35–22 (61%)	1
5	(Ukraine) Lyudmyla Kichenok (Latvia) Jeļena Ostapenko	6–7^{(5–7)}, 6–2, [10–12]	6–3, 1–6, [6–10]		6–7^{(7–9)}, 6–4, [10–8]	1–2	4–5 (44%)	32–31 (51%)	2
7	(Kazakhstan) Anna Danilina (Brazil) Beatriz Haddad Maia	7–5, 6–0	4–6, 3–6	7–6^{(9–7)}, 4–6, [8–10]		1–2	3–4 (43%)	31–30 (51%)	3

Standings are determined by: 1. number of wins; 2. number of matches; 3. in two-team ties, head-to-head records; 4. in three-team ties, (a) percentage of sets won (head-to-head records if two teams remain tied), then (b) percentage of games won (head-to-head records if two teams remain tied), then (c) WTA rankings.
