= Veronika Kudermetova =

Russian tennis player (born 1997)

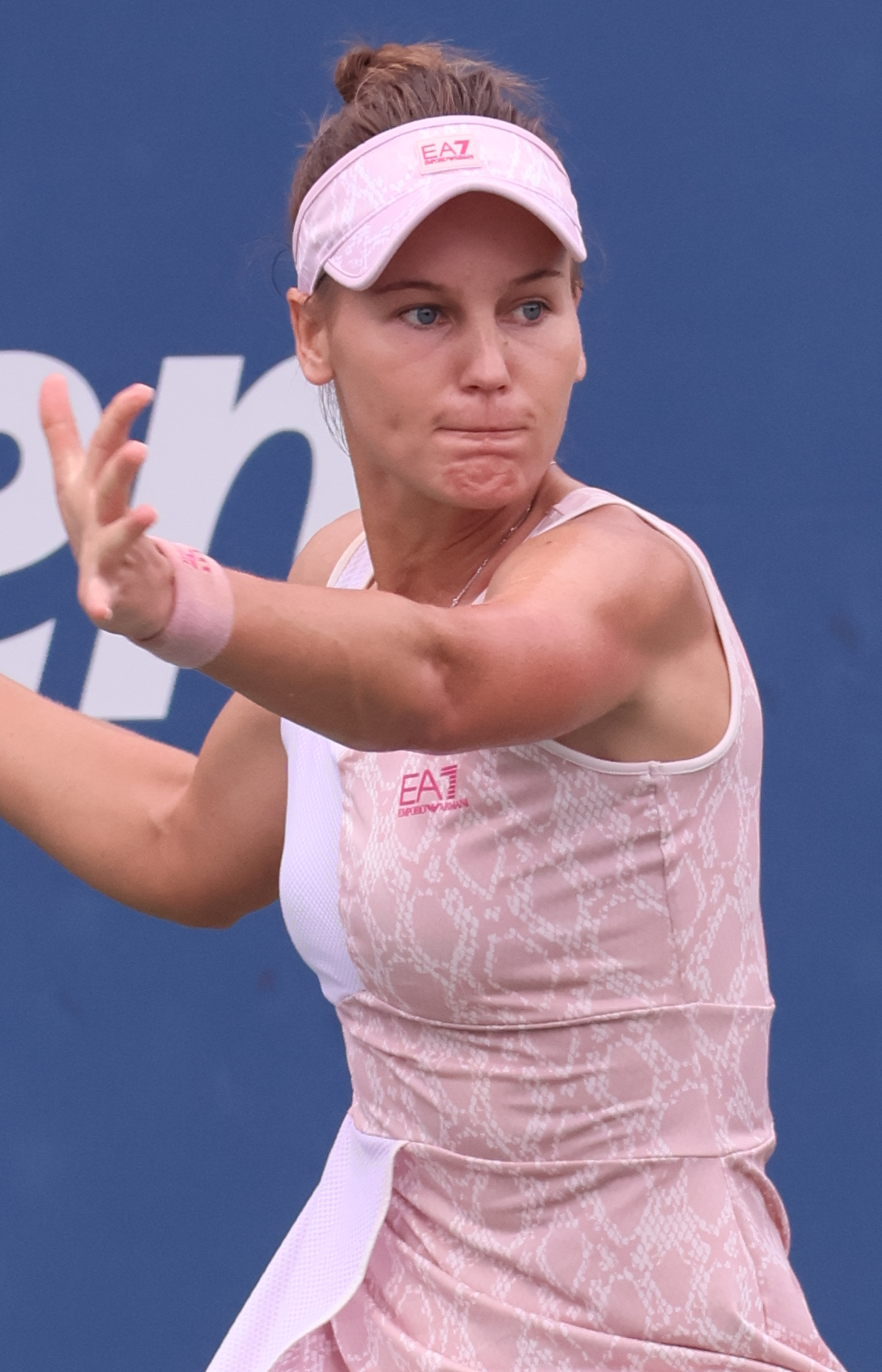
- Kudermetova in the 2023 US Open
- Full name: Veronika Eduardovna Kudermetova
- Native name: Вероника Кудерметова
- Country (sports): Russia
- Residence: Moscow, Russia
- Born: 24 April 1997 (age 29) Kazan, Russia
- Height: 1.75 m (5 ft 9 in)
- Turned pro: 2011
- Plays: Right-handed (two-handed backhand)
- Coach: Sergei Demekhine (2012–), Vladimír Pláteník (2021–2023), Dmitry Tursunov (2023)
- Prize money: $10,680,692

Singles
- Career record: 397–276
- Career titles: 2
- Highest ranking: No. 9 (24 October 2022)
- Current ranking: No. 670 (12 October 2026)

Grand Slam singles results
- Australian Open: 4R (2025)
- French Open: QF (2022)
- Wimbledon: 2R (2019, 2023, 2025)
- US Open: 4R (2022)

Other tournaments
- Tour Finals: Alt (2022)
- Olympic Games: 1R (2021)

Doubles
- Career record: 379–182
- Career titles: 10
- Highest ranking: No. 2 (6 June 2022)
- Current ranking: No. 70 (12 October 2026)

Grand Slam doubles results
- Australian Open: SF (2022)
- French Open: QF (2023, 2025)
- Wimbledon: W (2025)
- US Open: SF (2020, 2024, 2025)

Other doubles tournaments
- Tour Finals: W (2022, 2025)
- Olympic Games: SF – 4th (2021)

Grand Slam mixed doubles results
- Australian Open: 2R (2024)
- French Open: 1R (2024)

Team competitions
- Fed Cup: W (2020–21), record: 3–4
- Hopman Cup: RR (2019)
Medal record
Representing Russia
Summer Universiade
Bronze medal – third place	2015 Gwangju	Mixed doubles
- Last updated on: 17 October 2026.

Veronika Eduardovna Kudermetova (Note: Russian: Вероника Эдуардовна Кудерметова; pronounced [vʲɪrɐˈnʲikə kʊdʲɪrˈmʲetəvə]; Tatar: Вероника Эдуард кызы Кадыйрмәтова, romanized: Veronika Edward qızı Qadıyrmätova.) (born 24 April 1997) is a Russian inactive tennis player. She has a career-high singles ranking of world No. 9, achieved on 24 October 2022, and a best WTA doubles ranking of No. 2, reached on 6 June 2022. She is a doubles major champion at the 2025 Wimbledon Championships with Elise Mertens. She has won an additional nine WTA Tour doubles titles including three WTA 1000 and being crowned champion at the 2022 and 2025 WTA Finals editions. In addition, she reached the doubles final of Wimbledon in 2021, with Elena Vesnina. She has also won two WTA Tour singles titles.

Kudermetova made her WTA Tour main-draw debut in singles at the 2018 Porsche Tennis Grand Prix, and in doubles at the 2014 Kremlin Cup, partnering with Evgeniya Rodina. Later, she won her first WTA Tour singles title at the 2021 Charleston Open, and her first WTA doubles title at the 2019 Wuhan Open, partnering Duan Yingying.

Playing for the Russia Fed Cup team, Kudermetova has a win–loss record of 3–4.

== Personal life ==
Kudermetova was born to Eduard Kudermetov, a Russian national ice hockey champion of Volga Tatar origin and a Russian mother. She started playing tennis at the age of eight. Her younger sister Polina Kudermetova (born 2003) is also a professional tennis player.

Kudermetova is married to tennis coach and former professional player Sergei Demekhine, whose career-high singles ranking is No. 673. They started dating in 2015 despite Demekhine returning to being her coach again since 2012, on which Kudermetova commented in 2020: "At the age of 16 I just liked him but I didn't even think about anything more. Probably, it's my upbringing that affected. Such thoughts had been unacceptable to me".

== Career ==
=== 2013–14: First ITF Circuit title ===
Partnering Evgeniya Rodina, Kudermetova won her first $50k tournament at the Kazan Summer Cup, defeating Alexandra Artamonova and Martina Borecká in the final. There, she also reached the semifinals in singles as a wildcard entrant.

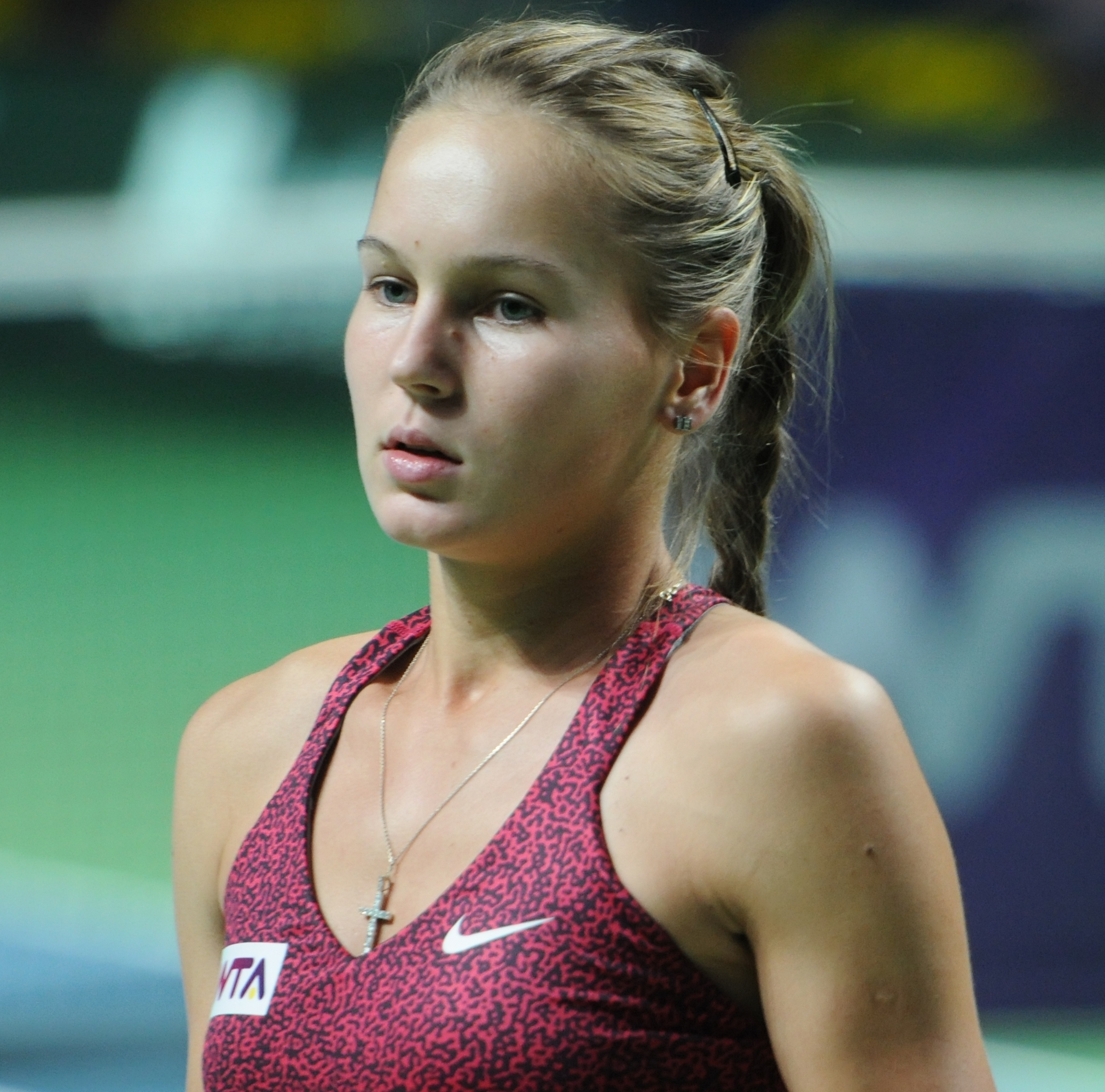
... at the 2014 Kremlin Cup

Kudermetova reached consecutive $10k finals at Antalya at the start of the year, and after several strong performances, she cracked the world's top 500 for the first time in her career. Playing in her first $100k tournament at the President's Cup, she reached the quarterfinals before falling to eventual champion, Vitalia Diatchenko.

She ended the year as the No. 343 in the rankings with a 24–14 win-loss record, lifting her maiden ITF title in the process.

=== 2015–17: Major & WTA Tour debut ===
The 2015 season saw Kudermetova failing to win a single title on the ITF Circuit as she had a 15–15 win–loss record with just one final reached. Her year-end ranking was 400.

After a lacklustre start to 2016, Kudermetova made her first final of the year at Andijan in May. It was followed by consecutive $25k titles in Imola and Astana, ensuring that she moved into the world's top 300 for the first time. A fourth final of the season in Telavi marked her continuous rise. Her ranking soon made it possible for a direct admission into the main draw of the Taipei Challenger, her debut on a WTA 125 tournament. She won her first match against Varatchaya Wongteanchai, before losing in the second round.

Overall, she enjoyed a 34–18 win–loss record in 2016, with a total of two ITF Circuit titles. Her year-end ranking improved by a total of 190 spots, ending at the 210th spot.

Her major debut came at the 2017 Australian Open, where she lost in the first round of qualifying. Attempting a transition onto the WTA Tour, she played qualifying in multiple events but failed to reach the main draw in all of them. Kudermetova won her first qualifying round at the French Open but fell in her next match. She reached her first WTA 125 quarterfinal, at the 2017 Taipei Challenger to end off the year.

Kudermetova had a 28–24 win-loss record for 2017, failing to reach any finals but recorded more appearances on the WTA Tour.

=== 2018: Top 30 win, first career main-draw win ===
After starting the year with a triumph at the $25k event at the Yokohama Challenger, she qualified for her first WTA Tour event at the Porsche Tennis Grand Prix, a Premier tournament. Riding on her momentum, Kudermetova stunned top-30 player Carla Suárez Navarro in the first round before putting up a strong performance against eventual champion and top-10 player Karolína Plíšková.

She reached the final round of qualifying at the French Open for the first time in her career, where she fell to Barbora Krejčíková. Another big win soon followed as she beat defending champion Anett Kontaveit on grass, in the first round of the Rosmalen Open. Furthermore, she stunned Belinda Bencic in her next match, reaching her first WTA Tour quarterfinal. She reached another WTA quarterfinal at the Ladies Championship Gstaad where she defeated Viktória Kužmová, before falling to Eugenie Bouchard, in straight sets.

She had a 34–23 win-loss record for the year, gaining first success on WTA Tour.

=== 2019: Top 40 singles debut, first Premier-5 title ===
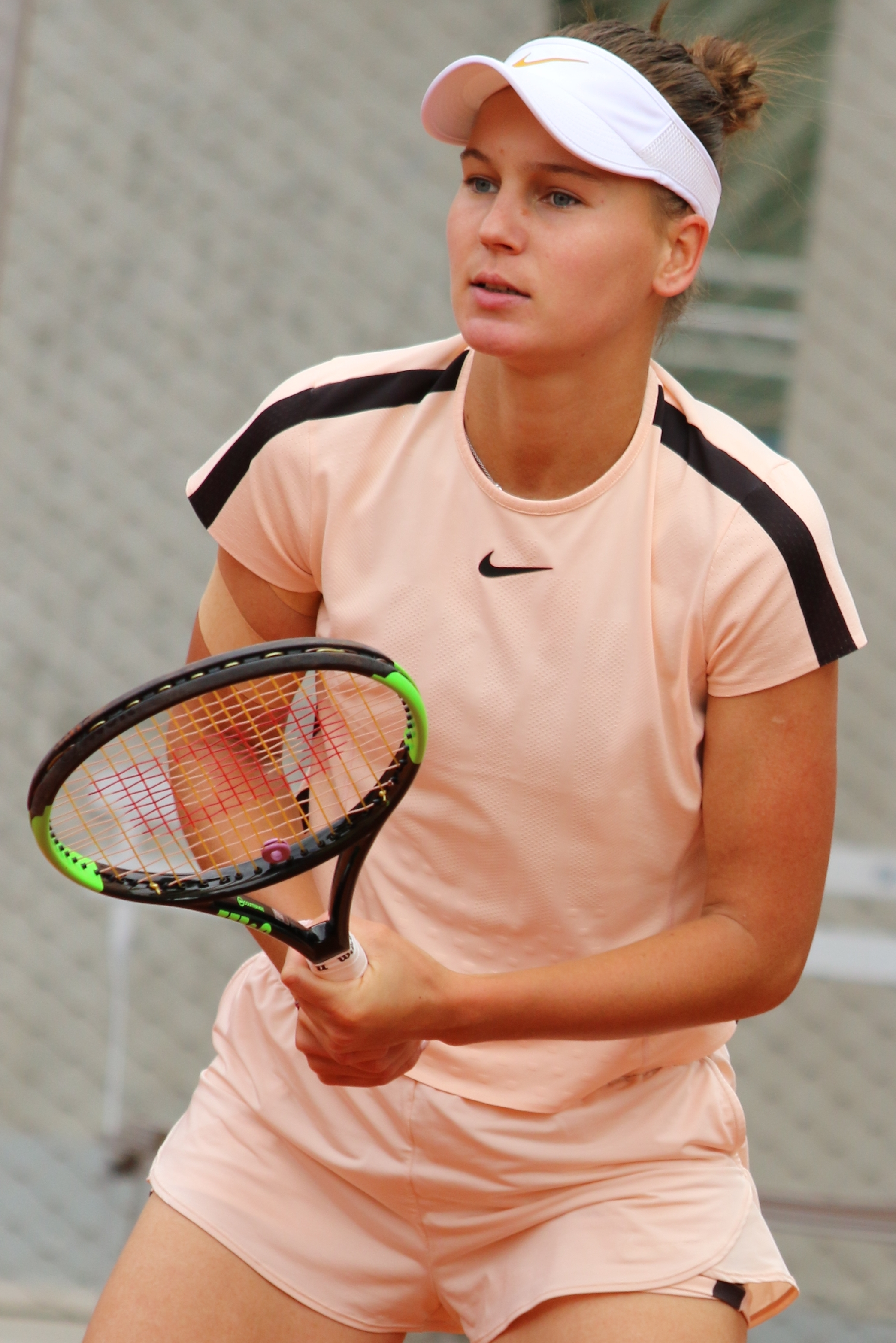
Kudermetova at the 2019 French Open

Kudermetova started the year with a quarterfinal run at the Shenzhen Open after qualifying for the main draw, defeating higher-ranked compatriot Anastasia Pavlyuchenkova in the process. She qualified for the main draw at the Australian Open for the first time in her career, losing to Sofia Kenin in round one.

At the WTA 125 event in Guadalajara, Kudermetova was unseeded but still managed to lift the biggest title of her career by defeating Marie Bouzková, 6–2, 6–0 in the final. Consecutive WTA quarterfinals came at the Ladies Open Lugano and the İstanbul Cup.

Her first major main-draw win came at the French Open when she beat Caroline Wozniacki, the 13th seed, in the first round. After beating Zarina Diyas in the second, Kudermetova was defeated by veteran Kaia Kanepi in the third round, despite winning the first set.

In July 2019, she reached the second round at Wimbledon, where she was beaten by Wozniacki. Prior to that, Kudermetova excelled at Rosmalen, making the semifinals where she was defeated by eventual champion Alison Riske.

In September, seeded eighth, she and Duan Yingying won the doubles title at the Wuhan Open, beating newly crowned US Open champions Elise Mertens and Aryna Sabalenka in the final. It was their first time playing together, and Kudemetova's first doubles title. It took her at No. 24 in the doubles rankings, on 30 September 2019. She reached third round in the singles competition, which also took her to a career-high singles ranking of 42. In the tournament, Kudermetova beat Belinda Bencic for her first career top-ten win.

On a fantastic Asian swing, Kudermetova reached two semifinals at the Japan Women's Open and the Tianjin Open, respectively. To end off her first full season on the WTA Tour, she stunned world No. 4, Elina Svitolina, in the second round of the Kremlin Cup and reached the quarterfinals as a result, falling to Anastasia Pavlyuchenkova.

A win-loss record of 44–25 saw Kudermetova ending the year (world No. 41) as the second highest-ranked Russian, lagging just behind Pavlyuchenkova, having reached a career-high of world No. 39 in singles on 11 November 2019, with three tour semifinals and one WTA 125 title. She finished the year at No. 25 in doubles.

=== 2020: Progress in singles and doubles ===
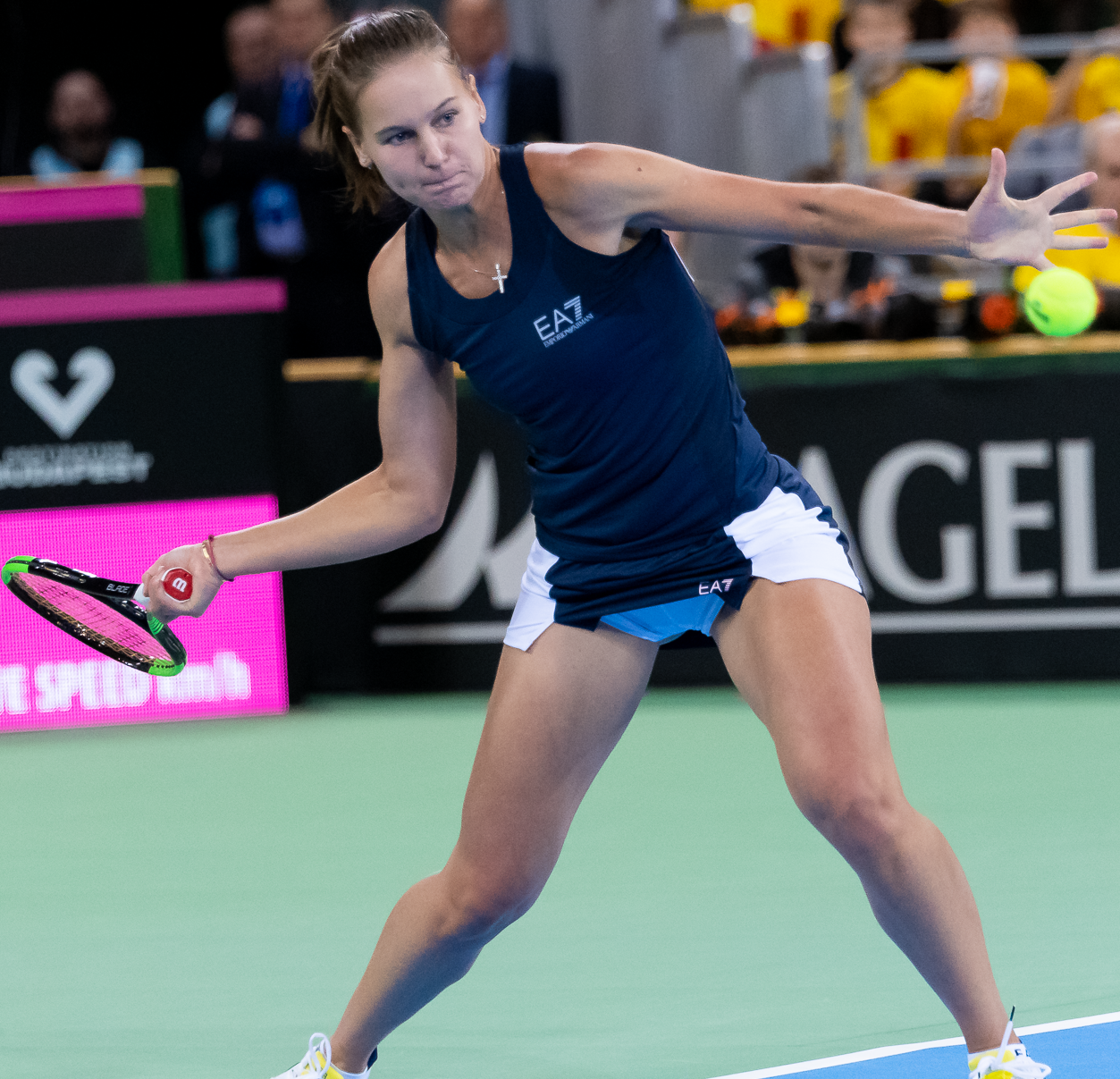
Kudermetova at the 2020 Fed Cup

Kudermetova began the year at the Brisbane International. She lost in the final round of qualifying to Marie Bouzková. Seeded fifth at the Hobart International, she reached the semifinals where she was defeated by fourth seed Zhang Shuai. As a result, she reached again the top 40 in singles, on 20 January 2020. At the Australian Open, she lost in the first round to Sara Sorribes Tormo. Despite the loss, she reached a new career-high of world No. 38, on 3 February 2020.

Playing for Russia in the Fed Cup qualifying tie against Romania, Kudermetova lost both of her rubbers to Ana Bogdan and Jaqueline Cristian. Despite those losses, Russia won the tie 3–2. In St. Petersburg, she was defeated in the second round by second seed, defending and eventual champion, Kiki Bertens. Getting past qualifying at the Dubai Championships, she lost in the second round to ninth seed Garbiñe Muguruza. At the Qatar Ladies Open, she was defeated in the second round by fourth seed Belinda Bencic. The WTA cancelled tournaments from March to July due to the COVID-19 pandemic.

When the WTA resumed tournament play in August, Kudermetova competed at the Prague Open. Seeded eighth, she lost in the first round to Eugenie Bouchard. At the Western & Southern Open, she stunned top seed and 2016 champion, Karolína Plíšková, in the second round. She was defeated in the third round by 14th seed Elise Mertens. Seeded 29th at the US Open, she lost in the first round to Iga Świątek. In doubles, she partnered with compatriot Anna Blinkova; they both reached the semifinals of a major for the first time in their career where they lost to Laura Siegemund and Vera Zvonareva. Following this run, she achieved her career-high doubles ranking of world No. 22, on 14 September 2020.

Playing in Rome, Kudermetova was defeated in the first round by Barbora Strýcová. At the French Open, she lost in the second round to 13th seed Petra Martić.

Coming through qualifying at the first edition of the Ostrava Open, Kudermetova upset second seed Karolína Plíšková in the second round. In the quarterfinals, she was defeated by Jennifer Brady. Her final tournament of the season was at the Upper Austria Ladies Linz. Seeded fifth, she reached the quarterfinals where she lost to second seed and eventual finalist, Elise Mertens.

Kudermetova ended the year ranked No. 46 in singles and No. 24 in doubles.

=== 2021: First title & major final, top 15 in doubles ===
Kudermetova started 2021 at the first edition of the Abu Dhabi Open. She stunned second seed Elina Svitolina in the quarterfinals and defeated Marta Kostyuk in the semifinals. She lost in the final to fourth seed Aryna Sabalenka convincingly, but entered the top 40 for the first time in her career. At the first edition of the Grampians Trophy, she was defeated in the second round by Ann Li. Seeded 32nd at the Australian Open, she lost in the third round to second seed Simona Halep, after earning her first main-draw victories in Melbourne. In Adelaide, she was defeated in the first round by Shelby Rogers.

At Doha, Kudermetova lost in the first round to eventual finalist Garbiñe Muguruza. At Dubai, she was defeated in the second round by sixth seed and 2019 champion, Belinda Bencic. Seeded second in St. Petersburg, she reached the quarterfinals losing to eighth seed and eventual champion, Daria Kasatkina. Seeded 32nd at the Miami Open, she was defeated in the third round by seventh seed Sabalenka once again, although this time she owned a set point.

Seeded 15th at the Charleston Open, Kudermetova won her first WTA Tour singles title, beating Danka Kovinić in the final. Defeating the likes of Sloane Stephens and Paula Badosa, she did not lose more than eight games in a match and won the title without losing a set. She entered the top 30 at a career-high of No. 29 on 12 April 2021. The following week, she won her second doubles title at the İstanbul Cup, partnering Elise Mertens while also reaching the singles semifinals in which she lost to Mertens.

Kudermetova reached the third round of the Madrid Open with a top-ten win over defending champion Kiki Bertens, in straight sets. However, despite a tight match, she lost to Petra Kvitová eventually. At the Italian Open, Kudermetova upset Mertens in the first round but fell to world No. 1, Ashleigh Barty, in the third round.

She entered the French Open as one of the dark horses, and navigated a tough first-round win against former semifinalist Amanda Anisimova, in straight sets. However, she was stunned by Kateřina Siniaková in the second round, despite leading 5–1 in the final set.

Kudermetova began her grass-court season at the inaugural WTA German Open, where she defeated Karolína Muchová in a high-quality first-round match. She was upset by compatriot Liudmila Samsonova in the second round.

At Wimbledon, she was upset by eventual quarterfinalist Viktorija Golubic 11–9 in the final set, in the first round. In doubles, she partnered Elena Vesnina, and despite being unseeded, they ousted top seeds and reigning French Opens champions and top seed Barbora Krejčíková/Kateřina Siniaková and Caroline Dolehide/Storm Sanders en route to the final, saving match points in both matches. They had also previously beaten the seeded pairing of Coco Gauff and Caty McNally, played under the lights on Centre Court. They lost to the former number-one doubles players and third seeded pair, Hsieh Su-wei and Elise Mertens, in a tight three-set match, despite having two match points. With this successful run, she entered the top 20 in doubles at a career-high of world No. 16 on 12 July 2021.

At the Tokyo Olympics, Kudermetova represented the Russian Olympic Committee in both women's singles and doubles for the first time in her career. In singles, she lost in the first round to seventh seeded Garbiñe Muguruza in a very tight match. In doubles, she again partnered with Vesnina. The pair lost in the semifinal to eventual gold medalists, Krejčíková and Siniaková of the Czech Republic. In the bronze medal match, Vesnina and Kudermetova were defeated by Brazilians Laura Pigossi and Luisa Stefani, despite having four consecutive match points at 9–5 in the super-tiebreak.

Kudermetova snapped a four-match losing streak in singles against Yulia Putintseva at the Canadian Open, coming from 0–3 down in the final set to prevail. Partnering Elena Rybakina for the first time, they reached the doubles semifinal after losing just 14 games in the process.

At the US Open, Kudermetova suffered another first-round exit in the hands of Sorana Cîrstea, one of the highest-ranked unseeded players in the draw. She lost in the third round of doubles alongside Bethanie Mattek-Sands. The Russian claimed back-to-back singles wins for the first time since May at the Chicago Fall Tennis Classic, defeating Anna Kalinskaya in the first round and ousting Harriet Dart in the second round. She lost to Rybakina in the third round.

Kudermetova reached the third round of the Indian Wells Open for the first time in her career by defeating Samsonova but managed to win just one game against Iga Świątek. However, she achieved success in doubles alongside Rybakina as they defeated fourth seeds Alexa Guarachi and Desirae Krawczyk 10–0 in the super-tiebreak, and Lyudmyla Kichenok and Jeļena Ostapenko to reach the final. They lost to second seeds Hsieh and Mertens in the final.

=== 2022: WTA Finals & WTA 1000 champion, singles No. 9 & doubles No. 2 ===
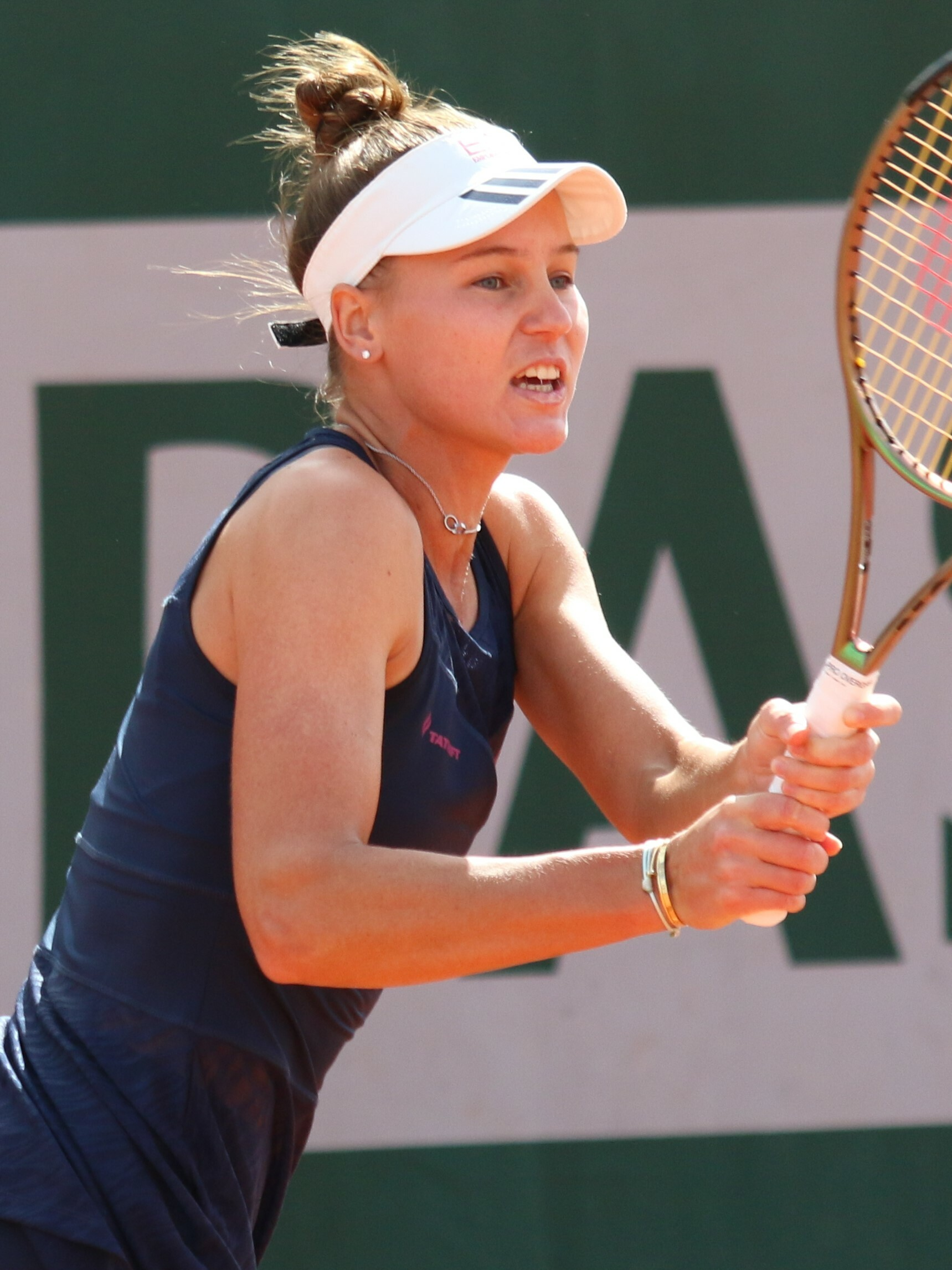
Kudermetova at the 2022 French Open

Kudermetova began her season at the Melbourne Summer Set 1, reaching the singles final but lost to Simona Halep, in straight sets. Seeded third in doubles at the Australian Open, she reached the semifinals with new partner Elise Mertens, where they lost to eventual champions Krejčíková and Siniaková. As a result, she made her top-ten debut in doubles at world No. 9, on 31 January 2022. She reached the third round in singles, falling to Maria Sakkari despite having an early lead.

At Dubai, Kudermetova earned her first top-20 win since May 2021, over Victoria Azarenka in the first round. She then earned her first win over fourth seed Garbiñe Muguruza in four attempts, coming from a set down to beat the Spaniard. Kudermetova beat Jil Teichmann to reach her first WTA 500 semifinal since her Charleston triumph, and received a walkover into the final after her scheduled opponent Markéta Vondroušová withdrew. She lost the final to Jeļena Ostapenko, in straight sets but reached a new career-high in the top 25 of the WTA rankings. At the same tournament, she won the doubles title, partnering Mertens, against Ostapenko and Lyudmyla Kichenok. They also reached the final of the WTA 1000 Qatar Ladies Open, with Kudermetova rising to a career-high ranking of No. 6 in doubles after the tournament.

She reached her first career WTA 1000 singles quarterfinal at Indian Wells, beating former world No. 1, Naomi Osaka, in straight sets, and Markéta Vondroušová after nearly three hours of action. However, she lost to defending champion Paula Badosa in the quarterfinals, her first loss to the Spaniard in four meetings. In doubles, Kudermetova and Mertens were stunned in the opening round by Eri Hozumi and Makoto Ninomiya.

Kudermetova reached two more WTA 1000 finals in doubles at the Miami Open, partnering Elise Mertens and at the Italian Open, partnering Anastasia Pavlyuchenkova, where she won her first WTA 1000 title defeating Madrid champions, Gabriela Dabrowski and Giuliana Olmos.

At the French Open, she reached a major quarterfinal in singles for the first time in her career, after Paula Badosa retired in the third round and a victory against Madison Keys in three sets, in the fourth. She made also the third round in doubles with Mertens. As a result, she reached a new career-high of world No. 2 in doubles after the conclusion of the tournament on 6 June 2022.

At the Silicon Valley Classic, Kudermetova reached the semifinals by defeating Ons Jabeur, in straight sets. At the US Open, she met Ons Jabeur again in the fourth round but this time lost in straight sets.

At the Pan Pacific Open, Kudermetova reached the semifinals eventually losing to Zheng Qinwen in three sets. Seeded second at the Jasmin Open, she lost to Alizé Cornet in the semifinals. In receipt of a first-round bye in Guadalajara, she defeated Donna Vekić and Jelena Ostapenko in straight sets. In the quarterfinals, she fell to Maria Sakkari in a close three-set match, which was also a qualifying match for the 2022 WTA Finals. Despite the result, she made her top-10 debut in the rankings at world No. 9 in singles, on 24 October 2022. However, she qualified for the WTA Finals in doubles with Mertens on 13 October 2022 for the first time in her career.

In Fort Worth, Kudermetova along with Mertens raced into the doubles final, as they finish 3–0 in the round-robin stage and eased past Desirae Krawczyk/Demi Schuurs in the semifinals. In the final, they came back from 2–7 down in the match-tiebreak to outlast defending champions and six time Grand Slam champions, Krejčíková and Siniaková, and win their third doubles title together.

Kudermetova capped off the best season of her career as she finished the year ranked No. 9 in singles, and No. 2 in doubles.

=== 2023: WTA 1000 doubles title, second singles title ===
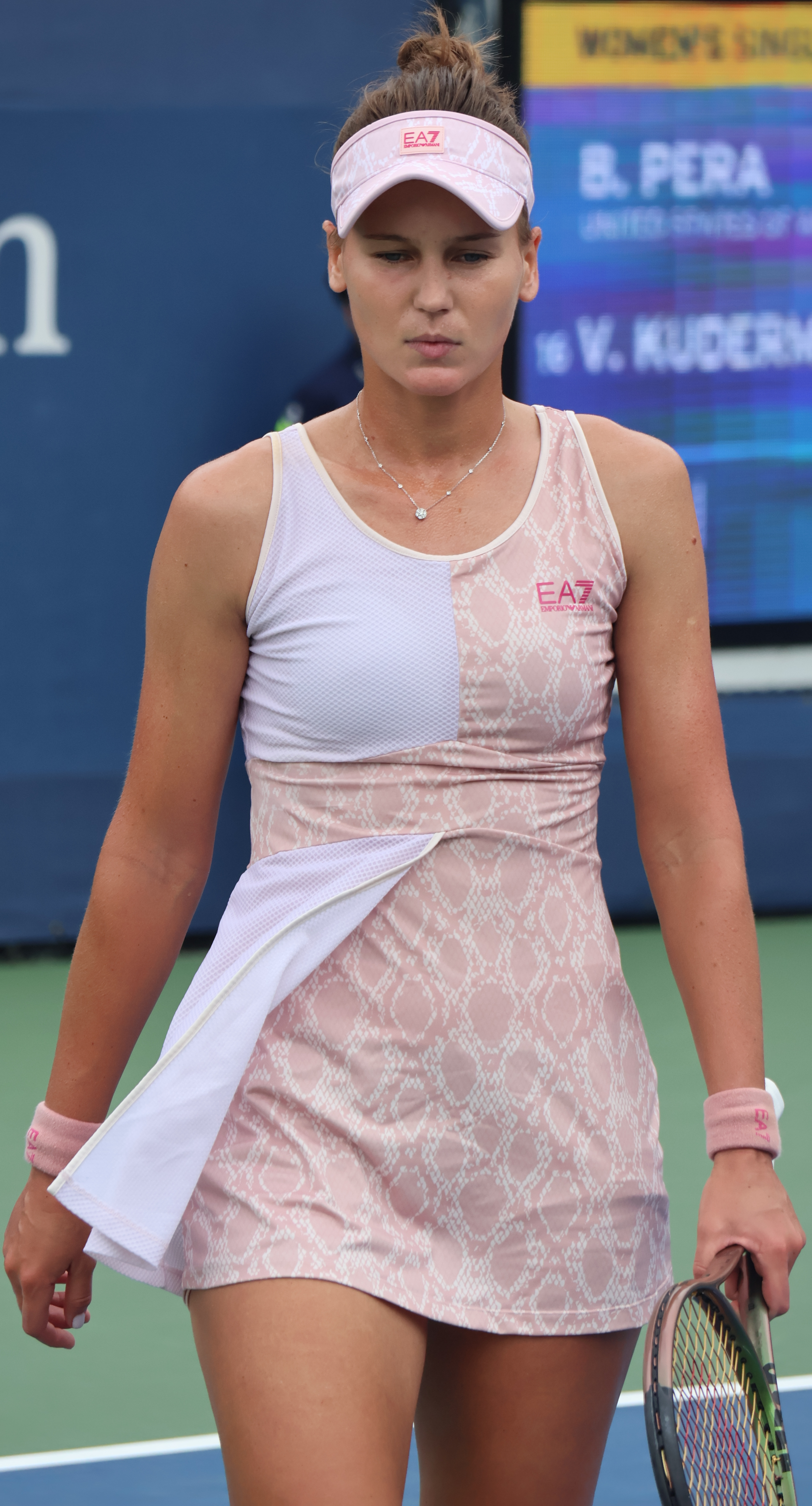
Kudermetova at the 2023 US Open

Veronika Kudermetova started the season at the Adelaide International, seeded fourth. In her first tournament as a top-10 player, she defeated Amanda Anisimova and Bianca Andreescu in the first two rounds, respectively. However, she was defeated in the quarterfinals by Irina Camelia Begu in straight sets. She continued her good form in the Adelaide 2 event, when she defeated Victoria Azarenka and Danielle Collins in three sets, saving five match points against the latter, to reach the semifinals. After withdrawing from the Adelaide 2 semifinals due to a hip injury, Kudermetova was upset in second round of the Australian Open by qualifier Katie Volynets, in three sets.

Kudermetova reached the quarterfinals of the Abu Dhabi Open, after beating former doubles partner Elise Mertens. She lost to Liudmila Samsonova She made the last four at the Qatar Ladies Open, beating Barbora Krejčíková in three hours and earning her first top-10 win of the year against Coco Gauff. However, she lost to world No. 1, Iga Świątek, winning just one game in the semifinal.

She then experienced a dip in form, winning just one match in five tournaments from Dubai to Stuttgart. She won consecutive matches for the first time since Doha in Madrid, where she made the semifinals, defeating top-10 players Daria Kasatkina and Jessica Pegula en route. She lost again to Iga Świątek in the final, this time winning two games. She then reached a second consecutive WTA 1000 semifinal in singles at the Rome Open, where she lost to Anhelina Kalinina. Despite strong performances at both clay 1000 events, she was upset in the first round of the French Open by Anna Karolína Schmiedlová.

Following a run to the final in 's-Hertogenbosch, where she lost to Ekaterina Alexandrova, and a win over world No. 2, Aryna Sabalenka, in Berlin, Kudermetova would post a 3–6 record from Wimbledon to Guadalajara, losing to Markéta Vondroušová, Venus Williams, Sara Sorribes Tormo, Bernarda Pera, Sofia Kenin, and Victoria Azarenka. Her ranking fell from No. 14 after Roland Garros to No. 19 after Guadalajara.

She entered the Pan Pacific Open in Tokyo as the eighth seed, and defeated Harriet Dart and Kayla Day in the first two rounds. She then notched her first win over world No. 2 and top seed Iga Świątek. After beating Anastasia Pavlyuchenkova in the semifinals, Kudermetova defeated world No. 4 and second seed, Jessica Pegula, in straight sets in the final, to clinch her second WTA Tour singles title, after a two-and-a-half-year drought.

In doubles, Kudermetova partnered Samsonova for the 2023 season. They fell to fourth seeds Storm Hunter and Elise Mertens in the second round of the Australian Open. However, they won their first title together at the Dubai Championships, defending her title from 2022.

She finished the season ranked No. 19 in singles and No. 29 in doubles.

=== 2024: WTA Finals doubles semifinal ===
Kudermetova had a low-key start to the season. She participated in the Brisbane International as No. 6 seed, beating Anna Karolína Schmiedlová in her debut in straight sets and losing in the second round to Anastasia Potapova in a three-set match. (Note: To obtain data from this reference, select the corresponding year on the WTA or ITF website.) Soon after, she participated in Adelaide International as No. 8 seed, beating Ashlyn Krueger in her debut in straight sets and losing in the second round to Ekaterina Alexandrova also in straight sets. After that, she went to the Australian Open, in which as No. 15 seed, she lost in the first round to Viktorija Golubic in a three-set match.

Continuing her campaign on hardcourts in the Middle East, Kudermetova participated in the Abu Dhabi Open, where as the ninth seed she lost to qualifier Heather Watson in the first round, in straight sets.

Teaming with Chan Hao-ching, she was runner-up in the doubles at the China Open in October, losing to Sara Errani and Jasmine Paolini in the final.

Kudermetova and Chan qualified for the WTA Finals and reached the semifinals after compiling a record of two wins and one loss in the group stages. They lost to Kateřina Siniaková and Taylor Townsend in the last four.

=== 2025: Wimbledon & WTA Finals doubles champion ===
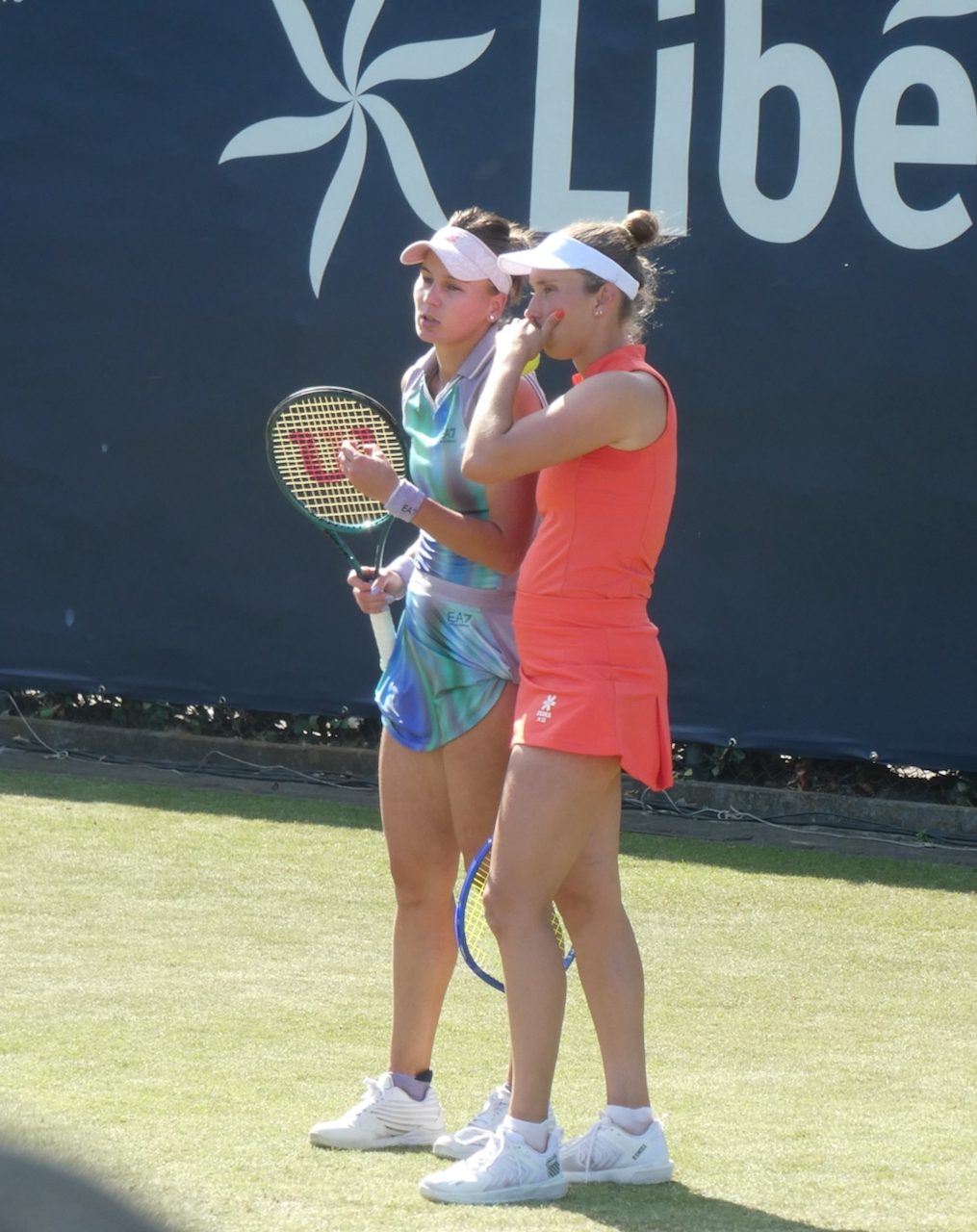
Kudermetova and Mertens at the 2025 Libéma Open

Kudermetova defeated Elisabetta Cocciaretto and Camila Osorio to reach the quarterfinals at the Hobart International, where she lost to second seed Elise Mertens in three sets.

At the Australian Open, she overcame Olivia Gadecki, 22nd seed Katie Boulter and 15th seed Beatriz Haddad Maia, before losing in the fourth round to 28th seed Elina Svitolina.

Entering the main draw as a lucky loser at the Abu Dhabi Open, replacing her sister Polina who had withdrawn, Kudermetova defeated fifth seed Liudmila Samsonova in three sets in the first round. She was double bageled by Belinda Bencic in the second.

Partnering with Mertens, she was runner-up at the Madrid Open losing to Sorana Cîrstea and Anna Kalinskaya in the final. They were also runners-up at the Italian Open in Rome, falling to Sara Errani and Jasmine Paolini in the championship match.

Seeded eighth at the Rosmalen Open, Kudermetova defeated her sister, Polina, and Greet Minnen to make it into the quarterfinals, at which point she lost to second seed Ekaterina Alexandrova, while in doubles with Mertens she reached the semifinals only for the pair to withdraw.

Kudermetova won her first major title at Wimbledon, combining with Mertens to defeat Hsieh Su-wei and Jeļena Ostapenko in the women's doubles final.

At the Cincinnati Open, she reached her first WTA 1000 semifinal in two years by defeating Suzan Lamens, 17th seed Belinda Bencic, 16th seed Clara Tauson, 31st seed Magda Linette and qualifier Varvara Gracheva. Her run was ended in the last four by seventh seed Jasmine Paolini. As a result of her performance, Kudermetova moved back into the world's top-30 in the WTA singles rankings for the first time since May 2024 at No. 26.

In November, Kudermetova teamed with Mertens to win the doubles title at the season-ending WTA Finals, defeating Tímea Babos and Luisa Stefani in the final.

=== 2026: Surgery and hiatus ===
Kudermetova withdrew from the Australian Open, announcing she had undergone surgery for an undisclosed issue and as a result would miss several months of the season.

== Fed Cup / Billie Jean King Cup ==
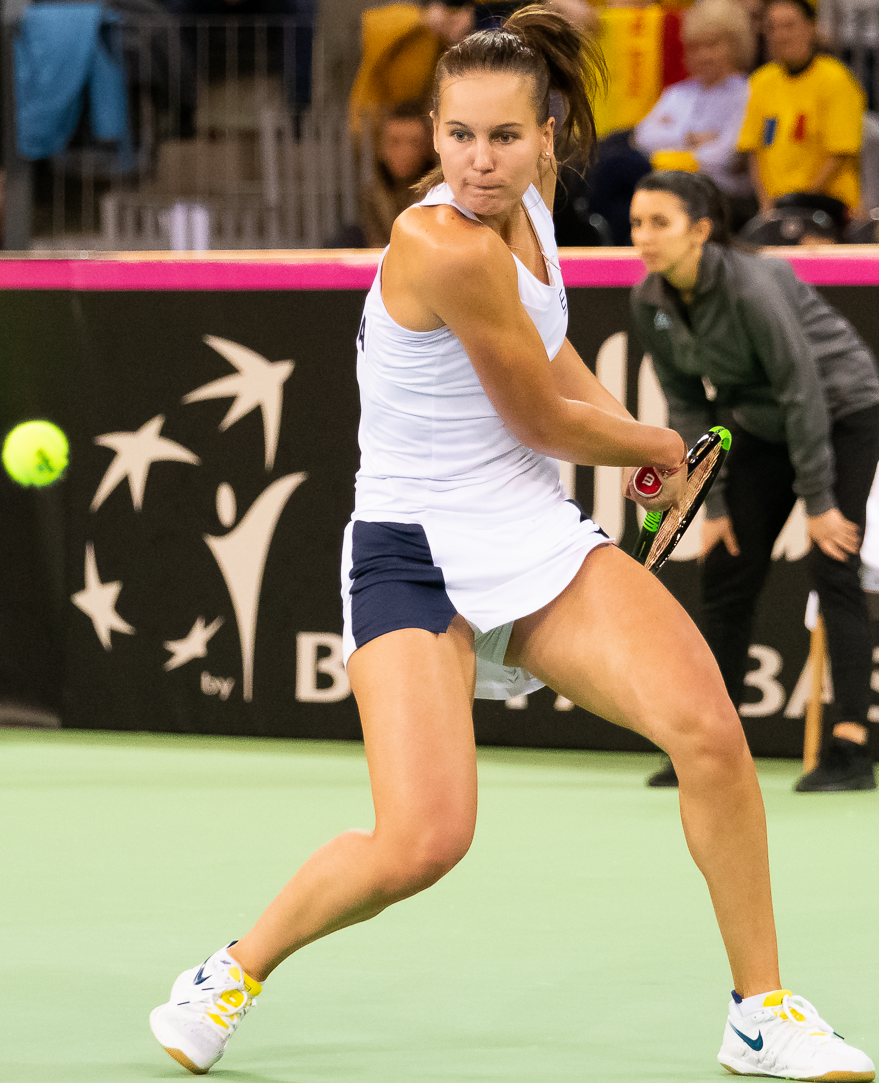
Kudermetova in a Fed Cup match against Romania in 2020

Playing for the Russia Fed Cup team, Kudermetova has a win–loss record of 3–4. She made her debut in February 2014, losing to Australia's Samantha Stosur in straight sets in their World Group first-round tie. She was also nominated to represent her country during the 2018 Fed Cup World Group II, but was only selected to play a dead doubles rubber alongside Anna Kalinskaya.

Now known as the Billie Jean King Cup, Veronika was selected as the second singles player for Russia in their qualifying round against Romania for a place in the Finals. However, she was beaten by the lower-ranked Ana Bogdan and Jaqueline Cristian. Nonetheless, Russia still managed to triumph 3–2 in the tie and book their spot in the Finals. As the top-ranked doubles player and third-ranked singles player for Russia, she was selected as part of Russia's roster for the Finals in Prague. In the Finals, Kudermetova won all three of her doubles rubbers partnering Liudmila Samsonova, helping Russia win their first title since 2008.

== Endorsements ==
Kudermetova was endorsed by Nike as a junior. After wearing Nike and Asics clothes without any personal contract with the brands, Kudermetova became endorsed by Armani for clothing in 2020, becoming the EA7 Brand Ambassador.

== Career statistics ==
=== Grand Slam performance timelines ===
Key
W	F	SF	QF	#R	RR	Q#	P#	DNQ	A	Z#	PO	G	S	B	NMS	NTI	P	NH

(W) winner; (F) finalist; (SF) semifinalist; (QF) quarterfinalist; (#R) rounds 4, 3, 2, 1; (RR) round-robin stage; (Q#) qualification round; (P#) preliminary round; (DNQ) did not qualify; (A) absent; (Z#) Davis/Fed Cup Zonal Group (with number indication) or (PO) play-off; (G) gold, (S) silver or (B) bronze Olympic/Paralympic medal; (NMS) not a Masters tournament; (NTI) not a Tier I tournament; (P) postponed; (NH) not held; (SR) strike rate (events won / competed); (W–L) win–loss record.
To avoid confusion and double counting, these charts are updated at the conclusion of a tournament or when the player's participation has ended.

==== Singles ====
Current through the 2025 WTA Tour.

Tournament	2017	2018	2019	2020	2021	2022	2023	2024	2025	2026	SR	W–L	Win %
Australian Open	Q1	A	1R	1R	3R	3R	2R	1R	4R	A	0 / 7	8–7	53%
French Open	Q2	Q3	3R	2R	2R	QF	1R	1R	3R	A	0 / 7	10–7	59%
Wimbledon	Q1	Q2	2R	NH	1R	A	2R	1R	2R	A	0 / 5	3–5	38%
US Open	Q1	Q2	1R	1R	1R	4R	1R	1R	1R	A	0 / 7	3–7	30%
Win–Loss	0–0	0–0	3–4	1–3	3–4	9–3	2–4	0–4	6–4	0–0	0 / 26	24–26	48%

==== Doubles ====
Tournament	2017	2018	2019	2020	2021	2022	2023	2024	2025	SR	W–L	Win%
Australian Open	A	1R	2R	3R	1R	SF	1R	2R (Note: Withdrawal during the tournament, not counted as a loss.)	2R	0 / 8	9–7	56%
French Open	1R	1R	1R	3R	1R	3R	QF	3R	QF	0 / 9	12–9	57%
Wimbledon	2R	2R	1R	NH	F	A	A	3R	W	1 / 6	15–5	75%
US Open	1R	1R	1R	SF	3R	2R	2R	SF	A	0 / 8	12–8	60%
Win–loss	1–3	1–4	1–4	8–3	7–4	7–2	4–3	9–3	10–2	1 / 31	48–29	62%

=== Grand Slam tournament finals ===
==== Doubles: 2 (1 title, 1 runner-up) ====
Result	Year	Tournament	Surface	Partner	Opponents	Score
Loss	2021	Wimbledon	Grass	(Russia) Elena Vesnina	(Chinese Taipei) Hsieh Su-wei (Belgium) Elise Mertens	6–3, 5–7, 7–9
Win	2025	Wimbledon	Grass	(Belgium) Elise Mertens	(Chinese Taipei) Hsieh Su-wei (Latvia) Jeļena Ostapenko	3–6, 6–2, 6–4

=== Year-end championships finals ===
==== Doubles: 2 (2 titles) ====
Result	Year	Location	Surface	Partner	Opponents	Score
Win	2022	WTA Finals, United States	Hard (i)	(Belgium) Elise Mertens	(Czech Republic) Barbora Krejčíková (Czech Republic) Kateřina Siniaková	6–2, 4–6, [11–9]
Win	2025	WTA Finals, Saudi Arabia (2)	Hard (i)	(Belgium) Elise Mertens	(Hungary) Tímea Babos (Brazil) Luisa Stefani	7–6^{(7–4)}, 6–1

=== Olympic medal matches ===
==== Doubles: 1 (4th place) ====
Result	Year	Tournament	Surface	Partner	Opponents	Score
4th place	2021	2020 Tokyo Olympics	Hard	(Russia) Elena Vesnina	(Brazil) Laura Pigossi (Brazil) Luisa Stefani	6–4, 4–6, [9–11]

== Awards ==
- The Russian Cup in the nominations:
  - Team of the Year – Girls Under-14: 2011;
  - Team of the Year – Girls Under-16: 2013;
  - Olympians-2020;
  - Team of the Year: 2021.
