= 2020 WTA Premier Mandatory and Premier 5 tournaments =

Women's professional tennis tour

2020 Premier Mandatory / Premier 5
Details
- Duration: February 24 – August 30
- Edition: 31st
- Tournaments: 9

Achievements (singles)
- Most titles: (Belarus) Victoria Azarenka (Romania) Simona Halep (Belarus) Aryna Sabalenka (1)
- Most finals: (Belarus) Victoria Azarenka (Romania) Simona Halep (Czech Republic) Petra Kvitová (Japan) Naomi Osaka (Czech Republic) Karolína Plíšková (Belarus) Aryna Sabalenka (1)

The WTA Premier Mandatory and Premier 5 tournaments, which are part of the WTA Premier tournaments, make up the elite tour for professional women's tennis organised by the WTA called the WTA Tour. There are four Premier Mandatory tournaments: Indian Wells, Miami, Madrid and Beijing and five Premier 5 tournaments: Doha, Rome, Canada, Cincinnati and Wuhan.

== Tournaments ==
Tournament	Country	Location	Surface	Date	Prize money
Qatar Open	Qatar	Doha	Hard	Feb 24 – Mar 1	$3,240,445
Indian Wells Open	United States	Indian Wells	Hard	Mar 9 – 22 (cancelled)	—
Miami Open	United States	Miami Gardens	Hard	Mar 23 – Apr 5 (cancelled)	—
Madrid Open	Spain	Madrid	Clay (red)	May 4 – 10 (cancelled)	—
Italian Open	Italy	Rome	Clay (red)	Sep 14 – 20 (rescheduled)	€1,692,169
Canadian Open	Canada	Montreal	Hard	Aug 10 – 16 (cancelled)	—
Cincinnati Open	United States	New York City	Hard	Aug 24 – 30	$2,250,829
Wuhan Open	China	Wuhan	Hard	Sep 28 – Oct 4 (cancelled)	—
China Open	China	Beijing	Hard	Oct 5 – 11 (cancelled)	—

== Results ==
* First-time champion

Tournament	Singles champions	Runners-up	Score	Doubles champions	Runners-up	Score
Indian Wells	Cancelled due to the COVID-19 pandemic.					
Miami	Cancelled due to the COVID-19 pandemic.					
Madrid	Cancelled due to the COVID-19 pandemic.					
Canada	Cancelled due to the COVID-19 pandemic.					
Wuhan	Cancelled due to the COVID-19 pandemic.					
Beijing	Cancelled due to the COVID-19 pandemic.					
Doha Singles – Doubles	(Belarus) Aryna Sabalenka	(Czech Republic) Petra Kvitová	6–3, 6–3	(Chinese Taipei) Hsieh Su-wei (Czech Republic) Barbora Strýcová	(Canada) Gabriela Dabrowski (Latvia) Jeļena Ostapenko	6–2, 5–7, [10–2]
Cincinnati Singles – Doubles	(Belarus) Victoria Azarenka	(Japan) Naomi Osaka	Walkover	(Czech Republic) Květa Peschke (Netherlands) Demi Schuurs	(United States) Nicole Melichar (China) Xu Yifan	6–1, 4–6, [10–4]
Rome Singles – Doubles	(Romania) Simona Halep	(Czech Republic) Karolína Plíšková	6–0, 2–1, ret.	(Chinese Taipei) Hsieh Su-wei (2) (Czech Republic) Barbora Strýcová (2)	(Germany) Anna-Lena Friedsam (Romania) Raluca Olaru	6–2, 6–2

== Tournaments details ==
Key

- Q = Qualifier
- WC = Wild card
- LL = Lucky loser
- Alt = Alternate
- ITF = ITF entry
- PR = Protected ranking
- SR = Special ranking
- SE = Special exempt
- JE = Junior exempt
- JR = Junior Accelerator Programme entrant
- CO = College Accelerator Programme entrant
- NG = Next Gen Accelerator Program entrant
- w/o = Walkover
- r = Retired
- d = Defaulted

=== Doha ===
==== Singles ====
Quarterfinals
1	(Australia) Ashleigh Barty	6	6^{4}	6
11	(Spain) Garbiñe Muguruza	1	7^{7}	2
WC	(Tunisia) Ons Jabeur	6^{2}	6^{4}
8	(Czech Republic) Petra Kvitová	7^{7}	7^{7}
(Russia) Svetlana Kuznetsova	6	6
4	(Switzerland) Belinda Bencic	4	4
(China) Zheng Saisai	6	6^{2}	3
9	(Belarus) Aryna Sabalenka	3	7^{7}	6

Semifinals
1	(Australia) Ashleigh Barty	4	6	4
8	(Czech Republic) Petra Kvitová	6	2	6
(Russia) Svetlana Kuznetsova	4	3
9	(Belarus) Aryna Sabalenka	6	6

Final
8	(Czech Republic) Petra Kvitová	3	3
9	(Belarus) Aryna Sabalenka	6	6

==== Doubles ====
Semifinals
1	(Chinese Taipei) Hsieh Su-wei (Czech Republic) Barbora Strýcová	6	4	[12]
4	(Czech Republic) Barbora Krejčíková (Czech Republic) Kateřina Siniaková	4	6	[10]
6	(Canada) Gabriela Dabrowski (Latvia) Jeļena Ostapenko	6	1	[10]
2	(Hungary) Tímea Babos (France) Kristina Mladenovic	4	6	[7]

Final
1	(Chinese Taipei) Hsieh Su-wei (Czech Republic) Barbora Strýcová	6	5	[10]
6	(Canada) Gabriela Dabrowski (Latvia) Jeļena Ostapenko	2	7	[2]

=== Cincinnati ===
==== Singles ====
Quarterfinals
14	(Belgium) Elise Mertens	6	6
Q	(United States) Jessica Pegula	1	3
4/WC	(Japan) Naomi Osaka	4	6	7
12	(Estonia) Anett Kontaveit	6	2	5
8	(United Kingdom) Johanna Konta	6	6
13	(Greece) Maria Sakkari	4	3
(Tunisia) Ons Jabeur	6^{9}	2
(Belarus) Victoria Azarenka	7^{11}	6

Semifinals
14	(Belgium) Elise Mertens	2	6^{5}
4/WC	(Japan) Naomi Osaka	6	7^{7}
8	(United Kingdom) Johanna Konta	6	4	1
(Belarus) Victoria Azarenka	4	6	6

Final
4/WC	(Japan) Naomi Osaka
(Belarus) Victoria Azarenka	w/o

==== Doubles ====
Semifinals
8	(Czech Republic) Lucie Hradecká (Slovenia) Andreja Klepač	2	1
3	(Czech Republic) Květa Peschke (Netherlands) Demi Schuurs	6	6
(Slovakia) Viktória Kužmová (Poland) Iga Świątek	4	5
2	(United States) Nicole Melichar (China) Xu Yifan	6	7

Final
3	(Czech Republic) Květa Peschke (Netherlands) Demi Schuurs	6	4	[10]
2	(United States) Nicole Melichar (China) Xu Yifan	1	6	[4]

=== Rome ===
==== Singles ====
Quarterfinals
1	(Romania) Simona Halep	6	2
(Kazakhstan) Yulia Putintseva	2	0^{r}
SE	(Belarus) Victoria Azarenka	6	3	4
9	(Spain) Garbiñe Muguruza	3	6	6
12	(Czech Republic) Markéta Vondroušová	6	6
4	(Ukraine) Elina Svitolina	3	0
11	(Belgium) Elise Mertens	3	6	0
2	(Czech Republic) Karolína Plíšková	6	3	6

Semifinals
1	(Romania) Simona Halep	6	4	6
9	(Spain) Garbiñe Muguruza	3	6	4
12	(Czech Republic) Markéta Vondroušová	2	4
2	(Czech Republic) Karolína Plíšková	6	6

Final
1	(Romania) Simona Halep	6	2
2	(Czech Republic) Karolína Plíšková	0	1^{r}

==== Doubles ====
Semifinals
1	(Chinese Taipei) Hsieh Su-wei (Czech Republic) Barbora Strýcová	7	6
(United States) Hayley Carter (Brazil) Luisa Stefani	5	4
(Germany) Anna-Lena Friedsam (Romania) Raluca Olaru	3	6	[10]
7	(Japan) Shuko Aoyama (Japan) Ena Shibahara	6	2	[4]

Final
1	(Chinese Taipei) Hsieh Su-wei (Czech Republic) Barbora Strýcová	6	6
(Germany) Anna-Lena Friedsam (Romania) Raluca Olaru	2	2

== See also ==
- WTA Premier tournaments
- 2020 WTA Tour
- 2020 ATP Tour Masters 1000
- 2020 ATP Tour
