= 2020 ATP Masters 1000 tournaments =

Men's professional tennis tour

2020 ATP Masters 1000
Details
- Duration: August 22 – November 8
- Edition: 31st
- Tournaments: 3

Achievements (singles)
- Most titles: (Serbia) Novak Djokovic (2)
- Most finals: (Serbia) Novak Djokovic (2)

The thirty-first edition of the ATP Masters Series. The champion of each Masters event is awarded 1,000 rankings points.

== Tournaments ==
Tournament	Country	Location	Surface	Prize money
Indian Wells Masters	USA	Indian Wells, California	Hard	—
Miami Open	USA	Miami Gardens, Florida	Hard	—
Monte Carlo Masters	France	Roquebrune-Cap-Martin	Clay	—
Madrid Open	Spain	Madrid	Clay	—
Italian Open	Italy	Rome	Clay	€3,854,000
Canadian Open	Canada	Toronto	Hard	—
Cincinnati Masters (Note: Cincinnati Masters was held on the USTA Billie Jean King National Tennis Center in New York City, United States due to the COVID-19 pandemic.)	USA	New York City	Hard	$4,674,780
Shanghai Masters	China	Shanghai	Hard	—
Paris Masters	France	Paris	Hard (indoor)	€3,732,680

== Results ==
* First-time champion
§ Career Golden Masters

Masters	Singles champions	Runners-up	Score	Doubles champions	Runners-up	Score
Indian Wells	Not held due to the COVID-19 pandemic.					
Miami	Not held due to the COVID-19 pandemic.					
Monte Carlo	Not held due to the COVID-19 pandemic.					
Madrid	Not held due to the COVID-19 pandemic.					
Canada	Not held due to the COVID-19 pandemic.					
Shanghai	Not held due to the COVID-19 pandemic.					
Cincinnati Singles – Doubles	(Serbia) Novak Djokovic^{§}	(Canada) Milos Raonic	1–6, 6–3, 6–4	(Spain) Pablo Carreño Busta* (Australia) Alex de Minaur*	(United Kingdom) Jamie Murray (United Kingdom) Neal Skupski	6–2, 7–5
Rome Singles – Doubles	(Serbia) Novak Djokovic	(Argentina) Diego Schwartzman	7–5, 6–3	(Spain) Marcel Granollers (Argentina) Horacio Zeballos	(France) Jérémy Chardy (France) Fabrice Martin	6–4, 5–7, [10–8]
Paris Singles – Doubles	(Russia) Daniil Medvedev	(Germany) Alexander Zverev	5–7, 6–4, 6–1	(Canada) Félix Auger-Aliassime* (Poland) Hubert Hurkacz*	(Croatia) Mate Pavić (Brazil) Bruno Soares	6–7^{(3–7)}, 7–6^{(9–7)}, [10–2]

== Tournament details ==
Key

- Q = Qualifier
- WC = Wild card
- LL = Lucky loser
- Alt = Alternate
- ITF = ITF entry
- PR = Protected ranking
- SR = Special ranking
- SE = Special exempt
- JE = Junior exempt
- JR = Junior Accelerator Programme entrant
- CO = College Accelerator Programme entrant
- NG = Next Gen Accelerator Program entrant
- w/o = Walkover
- r = Retired
- d = Defaulted

=== Cincinnati Masters ===
==== Singles ====
Quarterfinals
1	(Serbia) Novak Djokovic	6	6
(Germany) Jan-Lennard Struff	3	1
3	(Russia) Daniil Medvedev	6	4	3
8	(Spain) Roberto Bautista Agut	1	6	6
(United States) Reilly Opelka	6^{r}
4	(Greece) Stefanos Tsitsipas	5
(Canada) Milos Raonic	4	7^{7}	7
(Serbia) Filip Krajinović	6	6^{2}	5

Semifinals
1	(Serbia) Novak Djokovic	4	6	7^{7}
8	(Spain) Roberto Bautista Agut	6	4	6^{0}
4	(Greece) Stefanos Tsitsipas	6^{5}	3
(Canada) Milos Raonic	7^{7}	6

Final
1	(Serbia) Novak Djokovic	1	6	6
(Canada) Milos Raonic	6	3	4

==== Doubles ====
Semifinals
(United Kingdom) Jamie Murray (United Kingdom) Neal Skupski	7	6
3	(United States) Rajeev Ram (United Kingdom) Joe Salisbury	5	3
(Spain) Pablo Carreño Busta (Australia) Alex de Minaur	7	6
WC	(United States) Steve Johnson (United States) Austin Krajicek	5	4

Final
(United Kingdom) Jamie Murray (United Kingdom) Neal Skupski	2	5
(Spain) Pablo Carreño Busta (Australia) Alex de Minaur	6	7

=== Italian Open ===
==== Singles ====
Quarterfinals
1	(Serbia) Novak Djokovic	6	4	6
Q	(Germany) Dominik Koepfer	3	6	3
4	(Italy) Matteo Berrettini	6	3	6^{5}
(Norway) Casper Ruud	4	6	7^{7}
12	(Canada) Denis Shapovalov	6	3	6
15	(Bulgaria) Grigor Dimitrov	2	6	2
8	(Argentina) Diego Schwartzman	6	7
2	(Spain) Rafael Nadal	2	5

Semifinals
1	(Serbia) Novak Djokovic	7	6
(Norway) Casper Ruud	5	3
12	(Canada) Denis Shapovalov	4	7	6^{4}
8	(Argentina) Diego Schwartzman	6	5	7^{7}

Final
1	(Serbia) Novak Djokovic	7	6
8	(Argentina) Diego Schwartzman	5	3

==== Doubles ====
Semifinals
(France) Jérémy Chardy (France) Fabrice Martin	6^{5}	6	[10]
(Austria) Jürgen Melzer (France) Édouard Roger-Vasselin	7^{7}	4	[4]
4	(Spain) Marcel Granollers (Argentina) Horacio Zeballos	7^{7}	7^{7}
(Australia) John Peers (New Zealand) Michael Venus	6^{4}	6^{5}

Final
(France) Jérémy Chardy (France) Fabrice Martin	4	7	[8]
4	(Spain) Marcel Granollers (Argentina) Horacio Zeballos	6	5	[10]

=== Paris Masters ===
==== Singles ====
Quarterfinals
1	(Spain) Rafael Nadal	4	7	6
9	(Spain) Pablo Carreño Busta	6	5	1
4	(Germany) Alexander Zverev	6	7^{7}
12	(Switzerland) Stan Wawrinka	3	6^{1}
6	(Argentina) Diego Schwartzman	3	1
3	(Russia) Daniil Medvedev	6	6
10	(Canada) Milos Raonic	6	3	7^{9}
(France) Ugo Humbert	3	6	6^{7}

Semifinals
1	(Spain) Rafael Nadal	4	5
4	(Germany) Alexander Zverev	6	7
3	(Russia) Daniil Medvedev	6	7^{7}
10	(Canada) Milos Raonic	4	6^{4}

Final
4	(Germany) Alexander Zverev	7	4	1
3	(Russia) Daniil Medvedev	5	6	6

==== Doubles ====
Semi finals
(Canada) Félix Auger-Aliassime (Poland) Hubert Hurkacz	6	1	[10]
4	(Poland) Łukasz Kubot (Brazil) Marcelo Melo	2	6	[5]
8	(Austria) Jürgen Melzer (France) Édouard Roger-Vasselin	3	6^{4}
2	(Croatia) Mate Pavić (Brazil) Bruno Soares	6	7^{7}

Final
(Canada) Félix Auger-Aliassime (Poland) Hubert Hurkacz	6^{3}	7^{9}	[10]
2	(Croatia) Mate Pavić (Brazil) Bruno Soares	7^{7}	6^{7}	[2]

== See also ==
- ATP Tour Masters 1000
- 2020 ATP Tour
- 2020 WTA Premier Mandatory and Premier 5 tournaments
- 2020 WTA Tour
