= 2020 Masters =

2020 Masters may refer to:

- 2020 Masters Tournament, the 84th edition of The Masters golf tournament, held at Augusta National Golf Club in Georgia, United States
- 2020 Masters (darts), the 8th staging of the professional darts tournament held by the Professional Darts Corporation
- 2020 Masters (snooker), the 46th edition of the professional invitational snooker tournament held in London, England
- 2020 ATP Masters 1000 tournaments, series of nine top-tier men’s tennis tournaments held during the 2020 season

== See also ==
- Masters (disambiguation)
