= 2019 Western & Southern Open =

- Date: August 12–18
- Edition: 118th (men) / 91st (women)
- Category: ATP Tour Masters 1000 (men); WTA Premier 5 (women)
- Surface: Hard
- Location: Mason, Ohio, United States
- Venue: Lindner Family Tennis Center

Champions

Men's singles
- (Russia) Daniil Medvedev

Women's singles
- (United States) Madison Keys

Men's doubles
- (Croatia) Ivan Dodig / (Slovakia) Filip Polášek

Women's doubles
- (Czech Republic) Lucie Hradecká / (Slovenia) Andreja Klepač
← 2018 ·	Cincinnati Open	· 2020 →

The 2019 Western & Southern Open was a men's and women's tennis tournament played on outdoor hard courts from August 12–18, 2019. It was a Masters 1000 tournament on the 2019 ATP Tour and a WTA Premier 5 tournament on the 2019 WTA Tour. The tournament was one of two headline events in the 2019 US Open Series. The 2019 tournament was the 118th men's edition and the 91st women's edition of the Cincinnati Open and took place at the Lindner Family Tennis Center in Mason, Ohio, a northern suburb of Cincinnati, in the United States.

== Points and prize money ==
=== Point distribution ===
Event	W	F	SF	QF	Round of 16	Round of 32	Round of 64	Q	Q2	Q1
Men's singles	1000	600	360	180	90	45	10	25	16	0
Men's doubles	1000	600	360	180	90	0	—	—	—	—
Women's singles	900	585	350	190	105	60	1	30	20	1
Women's doubles	900	585	350	190	105	5	—	—	—	—

=== Prize money ===
Event	W	F	SF	QF	Round of 16	Round of 32	Round of 64	Q2	Q1
Men's singles	$1,114,225	$564,005	$289,290	$149,100	$74,695	$39,120	$22,045	$8,435	$4,220
Women's singles	$544,500	$269,576	$122,850	$62,660	$30,330	$15,600	$8,300	$5,100	$3,090
Men's doubles	$331,300	$161,680	$81,040	$41,280	$21,780	$11,660	—	—	—
Women's doubles	$143,600	$72,534	$35,910	$18,075	$9,170	$4,530	—	—	—

== ATP singles main-draw entrants ==
=== Seeds ===
The following are the seeded players. Seedings are based on ATP rankings as of August 5, 2019. Rankings and points before are as of August 12, 2019.

Seed	Rank	Player	Points before	Points defending	Points won	Points after	Status
1	1	(Serbia) Novak Djokovic	12,325	1,000	360	11,685	Semifinals lost to (Russia) Daniil Medvedev [9]
~~2~~	~~2~~	~~(Spain) Rafael Nadal~~	7,945	0	0	7,945	Withdrew due to fatigue
3	3	(Switzerland) Roger Federer	7,460	600	90	6,950	Third round lost to (Russia) Andrey Rublev [Q]
~~4~~	~~4~~	~~(Austria) Dominic Thiem~~	4,925	0	0	4,925	Withdrew due to illness
5	7	(Greece) Stefanos Tsitsipas	3,455	10	10	3,455	Second round lost to (Germany) Jan-Lennard Struff
6	5	(Japan) Kei Nishikori	4,040	45	10	4,005	Second round lost to (Japan) Yoshihito Nishioka [Q]
7	6	(Germany) Alexander Zverev	4,005	10	10	4,005	Second round lost to (Serbia) Miomir Kecmanović [Q]
8	9	(Russia) Karen Khachanov	2,890	90	90	2,890	Third round lost to (France) Lucas Pouille
9	8	(Russia) Daniil Medvedev	3,230	35	1,000	4,195	Champion, defeated (Belgium) David Goffin [16]
~~10~~	~~10~~	(Italy) ~~Fabio Fognini~~	2,555	(45)^{†}	0	2,510	Withdrew due to ankle Injury
11	11	(Spain) Roberto Bautista Agut	2,395	0	180	2,575	Quarterfinals lost to (France) Richard Gasquet [PR]
12	13	(Croatia) Borna Ćorić	2,195	45	10	2,160	First round lost to (United States) Reilly Opelka [WC]
13	16	(United States) John Isner	2,040	10	45	2,075	Second round lost to (Spain) Pablo Carreño Busta [Q]
14	18	(Croatia) Marin Čilić	1,940	360	10	1,590	First round lost to (Moldova) Radu Albot
15	17	(Georgia (country)) Nikoloz Basilashvili	2,020	(45)^{‡}	10	1,985	First round lost to (Russia) Andrey Rublev [Q]
16	19	(Belgium) David Goffin	1,815	360	600	2,055	Runner-up, lost to (Russia) Daniil Medvedev [9]

† The player used an exemption to skip the tournament in 2018. Accordingly, points for his 18th best result are deducted instead.

‡ The player did not qualify for the tournament in 2018. Accordingly, points for his 18th best result are deducted instead.

==== Withdrawals ====
The following players would have been seeded, but they withdrew from the event.

Rank	Player	Points before	Points defending	Points after	Reason
12	(Argentina) Juan Martín del Potro	2,230	180	2,050	Knee Injury
14	(South Africa) Kevin Anderson	2,140	90	2,050	Knee injury

=== Other entrants ===
The following players received wild cards into the main singles draw:

- (Argentina) Juan Ignacio Londero
- (United Kingdom) Andy Murray
- (United States) Reilly Opelka
- (United States) Sam Querrey

The following player received entry using a protected ranking:

- (France) Richard Gasquet

The following players received entry from the singles qualifying draw:

- (Spain) Pablo Carreño Busta
- (Croatia) Ivo Karlović
- (Serbia) Miomir Kecmanović
- (United States) Denis Kudla
- (Japan) Yoshihito Nishioka
- (Russia) Andrey Rublev
- (Norway) Casper Ruud

The following players received entry as lucky losers:

- (Argentina) Federico Delbonis
- (Kazakhstan) Mikhail Kukushkin
- (Portugal) João Sousa

=== Withdrawals ===
Before the tournament

- (South Africa) Kevin Anderson → replaced by (Italy) Lorenzo Sonego
- (Argentina) Juan Martín del Potro → replaced by (Australia) Jordan Thompson
- (Italy) Fabio Fognini → replaced by (Portugal) João Sousa
- (Spain) Rafael Nadal → replaced by (Kazakhstan) Mikhail Kukushkin
- (Canada) Milos Raonic → replaced by (Bulgaria) Grigor Dimitrov
- (Austria) Dominic Thiem → replaced by (Argentina) Federico Delbonis

During the tournament

- (Japan) Yoshihito Nishioka (illness)

=== Retirements ===
- (Spain) Fernando Verdasco

== ATP doubles main-draw entrants ==
=== Seeds ===
Country	Player	Country	Player	Rank^{1}	Seed
COL	Juan Sebastián Cabal	COL	Robert Farah	2	1
POL	Łukasz Kubot	BRA	Marcelo Melo	9	2
RSA	Raven Klaasen	NZL	Michael Venus	15	3
NED	Jean-Julien Rojer	ROU	Horia Tecău	23	4
FRA	Pierre-Hugues Herbert	FRA	Nicolas Mahut	27	5
CRO	Mate Pavić	BRA	Bruno Soares	28	6
FIN	Henri Kontinen	AUS	John Peers	29	7
USA	Mike Bryan	USA	Bob Bryan	34	8

- Rankings are as of August 5, 2019

=== Other entrants ===
The following pairs received wildcards into the doubles main draw:

- (Serbia) Novak Djokovic / (Serbia) Janko Tipsarević
- (United States) Ryan Harrison / (United States) Jack Sock
- (United States) Nicholas Monroe / (United States) Tennys Sandgren

The following pairs received entry as alternates:

- (India) Rohan Bopanna / (Canada) Denis Shapovalov
- (France) Adrian Mannarino / (France) Lucas Pouille

=== Withdrawals ===
Before the tournament

- (Italy) Fabio Fognini
- (Austria) Dominic Thiem

== WTA singles main-draw entrants ==
=== Seeds ===
Country	Player	Rank^{1}	Seed
AUS	Ashleigh Barty	1	1
JPN	Naomi Osaka	2	2
CZE	Karolína Plíšková	3	3
ROU	Simona Halep	4	4
NED	Kiki Bertens	5	5
CZE	Petra Kvitová	6	6
UKR	Elina Svitolina	7	7
USA	Sloane Stephens	8	8
BLR	Aryna Sabalenka	9	9
~~USA~~	~~Serena Williams~~	~~10~~	~~10~~
LAT	Anastasija Sevastova	11	11
SUI	Belinda Bencic	12	12
GER	Angelique Kerber	13	13
GBR	Johanna Konta	14	14
CHN	Wang Qiang	16	15
USA	Madison Keys	17	16

- ^{1} Rankings are as of August 5, 2019

=== Other entrants ===
The following players received wild cards into the main singles draw:

- (Russia) Svetlana Kuznetsova
- (United States) Caty McNally
- (United States) Bernarda Pera
- (United States) Alison Riske
- (Russia) Maria Sharapova

The following players received entry from the singles qualifying draw:

- (United States) Jennifer Brady
- (United States) Lauren Davis
- (Kazakhstan) Zarina Diyas
- (Tunisia) Ons Jabeur
- (Russia) Veronika Kudermetova
- (Sweden) Rebecca Peterson
- (Australia) Astra Sharma
- (Poland) Iga Świątek

The following players received entry as lucky losers:

- (United States) Jessica Pegula
- (Puerto Rico) Monica Puig
- (Czech Republic) Barbora Strýcová
- (China) Wang Yafan

=== Withdrawals ===
Before the tournament

- (Canada) Bianca Andreescu → replaced by (Puerto Rico) Monica Puig
- (United States) Amanda Anisimova → replaced by (Czech Republic) Barbora Strýcová
- (United States) Catherine Bellis → replaced by (United States) Venus Williams
- (United States) Danielle Collins → replaced by (Slovakia) Viktória Kužmová
- (Ukraine) Lesia Tsurenko → replaced by (China) Wang Yafan
- (Czech Republic) Markéta Vondroušová → replaced by (Russia) Ekaterina Alexandrova
- (United States) Serena Williams → replaced by (United States) Jessica Pegula

=== Retirements ===
- (Switzerland) Belinda Bencic (left foot injury)
- (Japan) Naomi Osaka (left knee injury)

== WTA doubles main-draw entrants ==
=== Seeds ===
Country	Player	Country	Player	Rank^{1}	Seed
TPE	Hsieh Su-wei	CZE	Barbora Strýcová	6	1
BEL	Elise Mertens	BLR	Aryna Sabalenka	19	2
CZE	Barbora Krejčíková	CZE	Kateřina Siniaková	20	3
CAN	Gabriela Dabrowski	CHN	Xu Yifan	20	4
GER	Anna-Lena Grönefeld	NED	Demi Schuurs	28	5
TPE	Chan Hao-ching	TPE	Latisha Chan	30	6
USA	Nicole Melichar	CZE	Květa Peschke	37	7
CZE	Lucie Hradecká	SLO	Andreja Klepač	49	8

- Rankings are as of August 5, 2019

=== Other entrants ===
The following pairs received wildcards into the doubles main draw:

- (United States) Jennifer Brady / (United States) Jessica Pegula
- (United States) Caty McNally / (United States) Alison Riske
- (Czech Republic) Karolína Plíšková / (Czech Republic) Kristýna Plíšková

=== Withdrawals ===
During the tournament

- (Chinese Taipei) Hsieh Su-wei (low back injury)
- (Croatia) Donna Vekić (low back injury)

== Champions ==
=== Men's singles ===
- (Russia) Daniil Medvedev def. (Belgium) David Goffin, 7–6^{(7–3)}, 6–4

=== Women's singles ===
- (United States) Madison Keys def. (Russia) Svetlana Kuznetsova, 7–5, 7–6^{(7–5)}

=== Men's doubles ===
- (Croatia) Ivan Dodig / (Slovakia) Filip Polášek def. (Colombia) Juan Sebastián Cabal / (Colombia) Robert Farah, 4–6, 6–4, [10–6]

=== Women's doubles ===
- (Czech Republic) Lucie Hradecká / (Slovenia) Andreja Klepač def. (Germany) Anna-Lena Grönefeld / (Netherlands) Demi Schuurs, 6–4, 6–1
