= 2019 Western & Southern Open – Men's singles =

Men's singles
- 2019 Western & Southern Open

Final
- Champion: (Russia) Daniil Medvedev
- Runner-up: (Belgium) David Goffin
- Score: 7–6^{(7–3)}, 6–4

Details
- Draw: 56 (7 Q / 4 WC )
- Seeds: 16

Events
Singles	men	women
Doubles	men	women
← 2018 ·	Western & Southern Open	· 2020 →

Daniil Medvedev defeated David Goffin in the final, 7–6^{(7–3)}, 6–4 to win the men's singles tennis title at the 2019 Cincinnati Masters. It was his first ATP Tour Masters 1000 title.

Novak Djokovic was the defending champion, but lost in the semifinals to Medvedev.

Nick Kyrgios set a record for the highest fine in ATP Tour history in his second round loss to Karen Khachanov. He was penalized $113,000 for five separate unsportsmanlike conduct violations including an expletive-laden rant, walking off-court to smash two racquets, and spitting at umpire Fergus Murphy.

== Seeds ==
The top eight seeds receive a bye into the second round.

1. (Serbia) Novak Djokovic (semifinals)
2. (Spain) ~~Rafael Nadal~~ (withdrew)
3. (Switzerland) Roger Federer (third round)
4. (Austria) ~~Dominic Thiem~~ (withdrew)
5. (Greece) Stefanos Tsitsipas (second round)
6. (Japan) Kei Nishikori (second round)
7. (Germany) Alexander Zverev (second round)
8. (Russia) Karen Khachanov (third round)

9. (Russia) Daniil Medvedev (champion)
10. (Italy) ~~Fabio Fognini~~ (withdrew)
11. (Spain) Roberto Bautista Agut (quarterfinals)
12. (Croatia) Borna Ćorić (first round)
13. (United States) John Isner (second round)
14. (Croatia) Marin Čilić (first round)
15. (Georgia (country)) Nikoloz Basilashvili (first round)
16. (Belgium) David Goffin (final)

Click on the seed number of a player to go to their draw section.

== Draw ==
=== Key ===
- Q = Qualifier
- WC = Wild card
- LL = Lucky loser
- Alt = Alternate
- ITF = ITF entry
- PR = Protected ranking
- SR = Special ranking
- SE = Special exempt
- JE = Junior exempt
- JR = Junior Accelerator Programme entrant
- CO = College Accelerator Programme entrant
- NG = Next Gen Accelerator Program entrant
- w/o = Walkover
- r = Retired
- d = Defaulted

=== Finals ===
Quarterfinals
1	(Serbia) Novak Djokovic	7^{7}	6
(France) Lucas Pouille	6^{2}	1
Q	(Russia) Andrey Rublev	2	3
9	(Russia) Daniil Medvedev	6	6
11	(Spain) Roberto Bautista Agut	6^{2}	6	2
PR	(France) Richard Gasquet	7^{7}	3	6
Q	(Japan) Yoshihito Nishioka
16	(Belgium) David Goffin	w/o

Semifinals
1	(Serbia) Novak Djokovic	6	3	3
9	(Russia) Daniil Medvedev	3	6	6
PR	(France) Richard Gasquet	3	4
16	(Belgium) David Goffin	6	6

Final
9	(Russia) Daniil Medvedev	7^{7}	6
16	(Belgium) David Goffin	6^{3}	4

=== Top half ===
==== Section 1 ====
First round
WC	(United States) S Querrey	7^{7}	7^{7}
(France) P-H Herbert	6^{2}	6^{1}
Q	(Spain) P Carreño Busta	7	7^{7}
(France) G Simon	5	6^{4}
(Serbia) D Lajović	6^{3}	6	5
13	(United States) J Isner	7^{7}	1	7
LL	(Portugal) J Sousa	6	3	2
(Canada) D Shapovalov	2	6	6
Q	(United States) D Kudla	3	6^{6}
(France) L Pouille	6	7^{8}
(Australia) N Kyrgios	7	6
(Italy) L Sonego	5	4

Second round
1	(Serbia) N Djokovic	7	6
WC	(United States) S Querrey	5	1
Q	(Spain) P Carreño Busta	6	6^{1}	7^{8}
13	(United States) J Isner	4	7^{7}	6^{6}
(Canada) D Shapovalov	4	4
(France) L Pouille	6	6
(Australia) N Kyrgios	7^{7}	6^{4}	2
8	(Russia) K Khachanov	6^{3}	7^{7}	6

Third round
1	(Serbia) N Djokovic	6	6
Q	(Spain) P Carreño Busta	3	4
(France) L Pouille	6^{3}	6	6
8	(Russia) K Khachanov	7^{7}	4	2

Quarterfinals
1	(Serbia) N Djokovic	7^{7}	6
(France) L Pouille	6^{2}	1

==== Section 2 ====
First round
(Italy) M Berrettini	6^{3}	3
WC	(Argentina) JI Londero	7^{7}	6
(Bulgaria) G Dimitrov	7	4	6^{4}
(Switzerland) S Wawrinka	5	6	7^{7}
Q	(Russia) A Rublev	6^{4}	6	6
15	(Georgia (country)) N Basilashvili	7^{7}	4	2
9	(Russia) D Medvedev	6	7
(United Kingdom) K Edmund	2	5
(Spain) F Verdasco	4	0^{r}
(France) B Paire	6	0
Q	(Croatia) I Karlović	5	6^{4}
(Germany) J-L Struff	7	7^{7}

Second round
3	(Switzerland) R Federer	6	6
WC	(Argentina) JI Londero	3	4
(Switzerland) S Wawrinka	4	4
Q	(Russia) A Rublev	6	6
9	(Russia) D Medvedev	7^{7}	6
(France) B Paire	6^{2}	1
(Germany) J-L Struff	6	6^{5}	7^{8}
5	(Greece) S Tsitsipas	4	7^{7}	6^{6}

Third round
3	(Switzerland) R Federer	3	4
Q	(Russia) A Rublev	6	6
9	(Russia) D Medvedev	6	6
(Germany) J-L Struff	2	1

Quarterfinals
Q	(Russia) A Rublev	2	3
9	(Russia) D Medvedev	6	6

=== Bottom half ===
==== Section 3 ====
First round
Q	(Serbia) M Kecmanović	6	6
(Canada) F Auger-Aliassime	3	3
(France) G Monfils	6^{7}	3
(United States) F Tiafoe	7^{9}	6
(Poland) H Hurkacz	6^{6}	3
11	(Spain) R Bautista Agut	7^{8}	6
14	(Croatia) M Čilić	4	6^{6}
(Moldova) R Albot	6	7^{8}
(Serbia) L Đere	6^{2}	3
(Argentina) D Schwartzman	7^{7}	6
WC	(United Kingdom) A Murray	4	4
PR	(France) R Gasquet	6	6

Second round
7	(Germany) A Zverev	7^{7}	2	4
Q	(Serbia) M Kecmanović	6^{4}	6	6
(United States) F Tiafoe	3	6	1
11	(Spain) R Bautista Agut	6	3	6
(Moldova) R Albot	4	2
(Argentina) D Schwartzman	6	6
PR	(France) R Gasquet	7	7^{7}
LL	(Argentina) F Delbonis	5	6^{1}

Third round
Q	(Serbia) M Kecmanović	1	2
11	(Spain) R Bautista Agut	6	6
(Argentina) D Schwartzman	6^{6}	3
PR	(France) R Gasquet	7^{8}	6

Quarterfinals
11	(Spain) R Bautista Agut	6^{2}	6	2
PR	(France) R Gasquet	7^{7}	3	6

==== Section 4 ====
First round
(Australia) J Thompson	5	7	4
Q	(Japan) Y Nishioka	7	5	6
(Australia) A de Minaur	6^{5}	6	6
(Italy) M Cecchinato	7^{7}	1	2
WC	(United States) R Opelka	4	6	7
12	(Croatia) B Ćorić	6	3	5
16	(Belgium) D Goffin	6	4	6
(United States) T Fritz	4	6	4
(Argentina) G Pella	7	7^{7}
Q	(Norway) C Ruud	5	6^{4}
(Chile) C Garín	4	1
(France) A Mannarino	6	6

Second round
6	(Japan) K Nishikori	6^{2}	4
Q	(Japan) Y Nishioka	7^{7}	6
(Australia) A de Minaur	7^{7}	6
WC	(United States) R Opelka	6^{3}	4
16	(Belgium) D Goffin	6	7
(Argentina) G Pella	1	5
(France) A Mannarino	6	6
LL	(Kazakhstan) M Kukushkin	1	3

Third round
Q	(Japan) Y Nishioka	7	6
(Australia) A de Minaur	5	4
16	(Belgium) D Goffin	7^{8}	6
(France) A Mannarino	6^{6}	2

Quarterfinals
Q	(Japan) Y Nishioka
16	(Belgium) D Goffin	w/o

== Qualifying ==
=== Seeds ===
1. (Kazakhstan) Mikhail Kukushkin (qualifying competition, lucky loser)
2. (Portugal) João Sousa (qualifying competition, lucky loser)
3. (Spain) Pablo Carreño Busta (qualified)
4. (United Kingdom) Dan Evans (first round)
5. (Hungary) Márton Fucsovics (first round)
6. (Norway) Casper Ruud (qualified)
7. (Serbia) Miomir Kecmanović (qualified)
8. (United Kingdom) Cameron Norrie (first round)
9. (Argentina) Federico Delbonis (qualifying competition, lucky loser)
10. (Australia) John Millman (first round)
11. (Spain) Feliciano López (qualifying competition)
12. (Russia) Andrey Rublev (qualified)
13. (Kazakhstan) Alexander Bublik (first round)
14. (United States) Tennys Sandgren (first round)

=== Qualifiers ===
1. (Russia) Andrey Rublev
2. (Japan) Yoshihito Nishioka
3. (Spain) Pablo Carreño Busta
4. (Croatia) Ivo Karlović
5. (United States) Denis Kudla
6. (Norway) Casper Ruud
7. (Serbia) Miomir Kecmanović

=== Lucky losers ===
1. (Kazakhstan) Mikhail Kukushkin
2. (Portugal) João Sousa
3. (Argentina) Federico Delbonis

=== Qualifying draw ===
==== First qualifier ====
First round
1	(Kazakhstan) Mikhail Kukushkin	6^{5}	6	6
WC	(United States) Jack Sock	7^{7}	2	3
Alt	(Australia) Bernard Tomic	1^{r}
12/Alt	(Russia) Andrey Rublev	2

Qualifying competition
1	(Kazakhstan) Mikhail Kukushkin	6	4	3
12/Alt	(Russia) Andrey Rublev	3	6	6

==== Second qualifier ====
First round
2	(Portugal) João Sousa	6	6
WC	(United States) Sebastian Korda	3	3
(Japan) Yoshihito Nishioka	6	7
10	(Australia) John Millman	4	5

Qualifying competition
2	(Portugal) João Sousa	4	6	4
(Japan) Yoshihito Nishioka	6	0	6

==== Third qualifier ====
First round
3	(Spain) Pablo Carreño Busta	6	6
(Romania) Marius Copil	2	2
WC	(United States) J. J. Wolf	6	6
13	(Kazakhstan) Alexander Bublik	3	3

Qualifying competition
3	(Spain) Pablo Carreño Busta	6	4	6
WC	(United States) J. J. Wolf	3	6	2

==== Fourth qualifier ====
First round
4	(United Kingdom) Dan Evans	6^{2}	6	1
(Germany) Philipp Kohlschreiber	7^{7}	1	6
(Croatia) Ivo Karlović	4	6	7^{8}
14	(United States) Tennys Sandgren	6	4	6^{6}

Qualifying competition
(Germany) Philipp Kohlschreiber	6^{4}	7^{7}	4
(Croatia) Ivo Karlović	7^{7}	6^{1}	6

==== Fifth qualifier ====
First round
5	(Hungary) Márton Fucsovics	1	4
(Australia) Alexei Popyrin	6	6
(United States) Denis Kudla	6	6
8	(United Kingdom) Cameron Norrie	3	4

Qualifying competition
(Australia) Alexei Popyrin	3	6	4
(United States) Denis Kudla	6	4	6

==== Sixth qualifier ====
First round
6	(Norway) Casper Ruud	7^{7}	7
(United States) Bradley Klahn	6^{5}	5
WC	(United States) John McNally	6	0	2
9	(Argentina) Federico Delbonis	3	6	6

Qualifying competition
6	(Norway) Casper Ruud	6^{5}	7	6
9	(Argentina) Federico Delbonis	7^{7}	5	3

==== Seventh qualifier ====
First round
7	(Serbia) Miomir Kecmanović	6	6
Alt	(France) Antoine Hoang	3	4
(South Africa) Lloyd Harris	6	2	2
11	(Spain) Feliciano López	3	6	6

Qualifying competition
7	(Serbia) Miomir Kecmanović	7^{7}	6
11	(Spain) Feliciano López	6^{5}	0
