= 2020 Iga Świątek tennis season =

2020 tennis player season

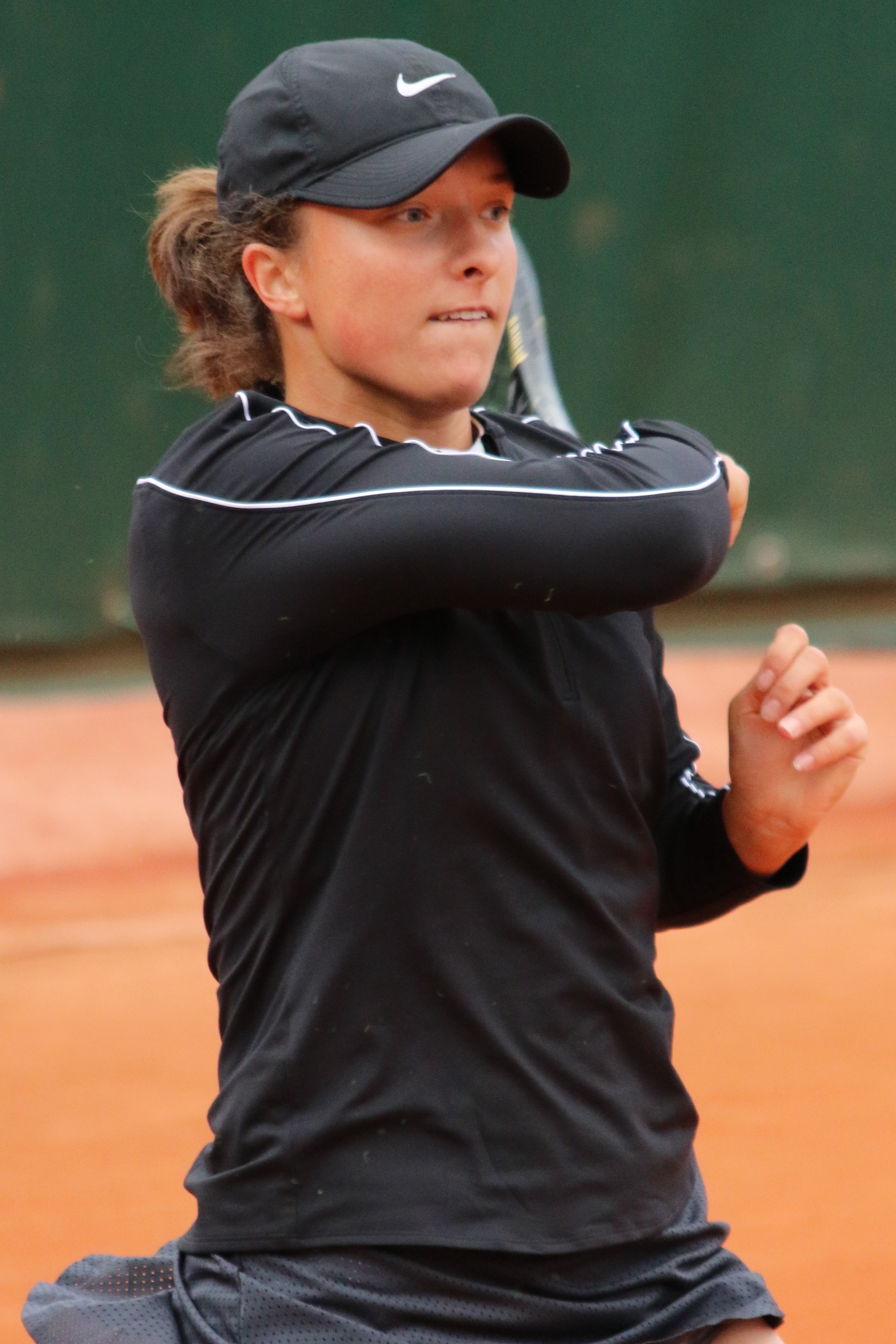
- Swiatek playing at the French Open
- Full name: Iga Świątek
- Country: Poland
- Calendar prize money: $1,923,151

Singles
- Season record: 16–5
- Calendar titles: 1
- Year-end ranking: No. 17
- Ranking change from previous year: ▲42

Grand Slam & significant results
- Australian Open: 4R
- French Open: W
- Wimbledon: NH
- US Open: 3R
- Championships: NH

Doubles
- Season record: 7–2
- Calendar titles: 0
- Year-end ranking: No. 75
- Ranking change from previous year: ▲376

Grand Slam doubles results
- Australian Open: A
- French Open: SF
- Wimbledon: A
- US Open: A
- WTA Championships: NH

Mixed doubles
- Season record: 2–1

Grand Slam mixed doubles results
- Australian Open: QF
- French Open: A
- Wimbledon: A
- US Open: A

Billie Jean King Cup
- BJK Cup: Z1
- Last updated on: 3 April 2022.

The 2020 Iga Świątek tennis season officially began on 20 January 2020 as the start of the 2020 WTA Tour. Iga Świątek entered the season as world number 59 in singles. The season saw the Polish player won the French Open.

== All matches ==
Key
W	F	SF	QF	#R	RR	Q#	P#	DNQ	A	Z#	PO	G	S	B	NMS	NTI	P	NH

(W) winner; (F) finalist; (SF) semifinalist; (QF) quarterfinalist; (#R) rounds 4, 3, 2, 1; (RR) round-robin stage; (Q#) qualification round; (P#) preliminary round; (DNQ) did not qualify; (A) absent; (Z#) Davis/Fed Cup Zonal Group (with number indication) or (PO) play-off; (G) gold, (S) silver or (B) bronze Olympic/Paralympic medal; (NMS) not a Masters tournament; (NTI) not a Tier I tournament; (P) postponed; (NH) not held; (SR) strike rate (events won / competed); (W–L) win–loss record.
To avoid confusion and double counting, these charts are updated at the conclusion of a tournament or when the player's participation has ended.

=== Singles matches ===
Tournament	Match	Round	Opponent	Rank	Result	Score
Australian Open; Melbourne, Australia; Grand Slam; Hard, outdoor; 20 January 2020 – 2 February 2020	1	1R	(Hungary) Tímea Babos	88	Win	6–3, 6–2
Australian Open; Melbourne, Australia; Grand Slam; Hard, outdoor; 20 January 2020 – 2 February 2020	2	2R	(Spain) Carla Suárez Navarro	54	Win	6–3, 7–5
Australian Open; Melbourne, Australia; Grand Slam; Hard, outdoor; 20 January 2020 – 2 February 2020	3	3R	(Croatia) Donna Vekić (19)	20	Win	7–5, 6–3
Australian Open; Melbourne, Australia; Grand Slam; Hard, outdoor; 20 January 2020 – 2 February 2020	4	4R	(Estonia) Anett Kontaveit (28)	31	Loss	7–6^{(7–4)}, 5–7, 5–7
Billie Jean King Cup Europe/Africa Zone; Esch-sur-Alzette, Luxembourg; Billie Jean King Cup; Hard, indoor; 5 February 2020 – 8 February 2020	5	Z1	(Slovenia) Nika Radišić	529	Win	6–2, 6–1
Billie Jean King Cup Europe/Africa Zone; Esch-sur-Alzette, Luxembourg; Billie Jean King Cup; Hard, indoor; 5 February 2020 – 8 February 2020	6	Z1	(Turkey) Berfu Cengiz	450	Win	6–3, 6–0
Billie Jean King Cup Europe/Africa Zone; Esch-sur-Alzette, Luxembourg; Billie Jean King Cup; Hard, indoor; 5 February 2020 – 8 February 2020	7	PO	(Sweden) Mirjam Björklund	325	Win	7–5, 4–6, 6–3
Qatar Open; Doha, Qatar; WTA Premier 5; Hard, outdoor; 24 February 2020 – 1 March 2020	8	1R	(Croatia) Donna Vekić (17)	24	Win	6–4, 7–5
Qatar Open; Doha, Qatar; WTA Premier 5; Hard, outdoor; 24 February 2020 – 1 March 2020	9	2R	(Russia) Svetlana Kuznetsova	46	Loss	2–6, 2–6
Cincinnati Open; New York, United States; WTA Premier 5; Hard, outdoor; 24 August 2020 – 30 August 2020	10	1R	(United States) Christina McHale (Q)	90	Loss	2–6, 4–6
US Open; New York, United States; Grand Slam; Hard, outdoor; 31 August 2020 – 13 September 2020	11	1R	(Russia) Veronika Kudermetova (29)	42	Win	6–3, 6–3
US Open; New York, United States; Grand Slam; Hard, outdoor; 31 August 2020 – 13 September 2020	12	2R	(United States) Sachia Vickery (WC)	160	Win	6–7^{(5–7)}, 6–3, 6–4
US Open; New York, United States; Grand Slam; Hard, outdoor; 31 August 2020 – 13 September 2020	13	3R	(Belarus) Victoria Azarenka	27	Loss	4–6, 2–6
Italian Open; Rome, Italy; WTA Premier 5; Clay, outdoor; 14 September 2020 – 20 September 2020	14	1R	(Netherlands) Arantxa Rus	71	Loss	6–7^{(5–7)}, 3–6
French Open; Paris, France; Grand Slam; Clay, outdoor; 27 September 2020 – 11 October 2020	15	1R	(Czech Republic) Markéta Vondroušová (15)	19	Win	6–1, 6–2
French Open; Paris, France; Grand Slam; Clay, outdoor; 27 September 2020 – 11 October 2020	16	2R	(Chinese Taipei) Hsieh Su-wei	63	Win	6–1, 6–4
French Open; Paris, France; Grand Slam; Clay, outdoor; 27 September 2020 – 11 October 2020	17	3R	(Canada) Eugenie Bouchard (WC)	168	Win	6–3, 6–2
French Open; Paris, France; Grand Slam; Clay, outdoor; 27 September 2020 – 11 October 2020	18	4R	(Romania) Simona Halep (1)	2	Win	6–1, 6–2
French Open; Paris, France; Grand Slam; Clay, outdoor; 27 September 2020 – 11 October 2020	19	QF	(Italy) Martina Trevisan (Q)	159	Win	6–3, 6–1
French Open; Paris, France; Grand Slam; Clay, outdoor; 27 September 2020 – 11 October 2020	20	SF	(Argentina) Nadia Podoroska (Q)	131	Win	6–2, 6–1
French Open; Paris, France; Grand Slam; Clay, outdoor; 27 September 2020 – 11 October 2020	21	W	(United States) Sofia Kenin (4)	6	Win (1)	6–4, 6–1

=== Doubles matches ===
Tournament	Match	Round	Opponent	Rank	Result	Score
Cincinnati Open; New York, United States; WTA Premier 5; Hard, outdoor; 24 August 2020 – 30 August 2020; Partner: (Slovakia) Viktória Kužmová	1	1R	(Ukraine) Lyudmyla Kichenok / (Ukraine) Nadiia Kichenok	34 / 37	Win	6–2, 6–3
Cincinnati Open; New York, United States; WTA Premier 5; Hard, outdoor; 24 August 2020 – 30 August 2020; Partner: (Slovakia) Viktória Kužmová	2	2R	(United States) Asia Muhammad / (United States) Taylor Townsend	49 / 84	Win	7–6^{(7–3)}, 6–3
Cincinnati Open; New York, United States; WTA Premier 5; Hard, outdoor; 24 August 2020 – 30 August 2020; Partner: (Slovakia) Viktória Kužmová	3	QF	(United States) Jessica Pegula / (United States) Shelby Rogers (WC)	117 / 337	Win	6–1, 1–6, [10–7]
Cincinnati Open; New York, United States; WTA Premier 5; Hard, outdoor; 24 August 2020 – 30 August 2020; Partner: (Slovakia) Viktória Kužmová	4	SF	(China) Xu Yifan / (United States) Nicole Melichar-Martinez (2)	10 / 19	Loss	4–6, 5–7
French Open; Paris, France; Grand Slam; Clay, outdoor; 27 September 2020 – 11 October 2020; Partner: (United States) Nicole Melichar-Martinez	5	1R	(Switzerland) Xenia Knoll / (Montenegro) Danka Kovinić	84 / 171	Win	6–3, 6–1
French Open; Paris, France; Grand Slam; Clay, outdoor; 27 September 2020 – 11 October 2020; Partner: (United States) Nicole Melichar-Martinez	6	2R	(Germany) Laura Siegemund / (Russia) Vera Zvonareva (12)	36 / 41	Win	6–3, ret.
French Open; Paris, France; Grand Slam; Clay, outdoor; 27 September 2020 – 11 October 2020; Partner: (United States) Nicole Melichar-Martinez	7	3R	(Netherlands) Demi Schuurs / (Czech Republic) Květa Peschke (6)	11 / 17	Win	6–3, 6–4
French Open; Paris, France; Grand Slam; Clay, outdoor; 27 September 2020 – 11 October 2020; Partner: (United States) Nicole Melichar-Martinez	8	QF	(United States) Asia Muhammad / (United States) Taylor Townsend	39 / 98	Win	6–3, 6–4
French Open; Paris, France; Grand Slam; Clay, outdoor; 27 September 2020 – 11 October 2020; Partner: (United States) Nicole Melichar-Martinez	9	SF	(United States) Desirae Krawczyk / (Chile) Alexa Guarachi (14)	38 / 45	Loss	6–7^{(5–7)}, 6–1, 4–6

=== Mixed doubles matches ===
Tournament	Match	Round	Opponent	Combined Rank	Result	Score
Australian Open; Melbourne, Australia; Grand Slam; Hard, outdoor; 20 January 2020 – 2 February 2020; Partner: (Poland) Łukasz Kubot	1	1R	(Australia) Ellen Perez / (Australia) Luke Saville (WC)	137	Win	6–4, 7–5
Australian Open; Melbourne, Australia; Grand Slam; Hard, outdoor; 20 January 2020 – 2 February 2020; Partner: (Poland) Łukasz Kubot	2	2R	(Chinese Taipei) Chan Hao-ching / (New Zealand) Michael Venus (4)	26	Win	6–2, 6–3
Australian Open; Melbourne, Australia; Grand Slam; Hard, outdoor; 20 January 2020 – 2 February 2020; Partner: (Poland) Łukasz Kubot	3	QF	(Australia) Astra Sharma / (Australia) John-Patrick Smith (WC)	213	Loss	6–3, 6–7^{(4–7)}, [3–10]

== Tournament schedule ==
=== Singles schedule ===
Date	Tournament	Location	Category	Surface	Previous result	Previous points	New points	Outcome
20 January 2020 – 2 February 2020	Australian Open	Australia	Grand Slam	Hard	Second round	110	240	Fourth round lost to (Estonia) Anett Kontaveit; 7–6^{(7–4)}, 5–7, 5–7
24 February 2020 – 1 March 2020	Qatar Open	Qatar	WTA Premier 5	Hard	Did not play	0	60	Second round lost to (Russia) Svetlana Kuznetsova; 2–6, 2–6
24 August 2020 – 30 August 2020	Cincinnati Open	United States	WTA Premier 5	Hard	Second round	90	1	First round lost to (United States) Christina McHale; 2–6, 4–6
31 August 2020 – 13 September 2020	US Open	United States	Grand Slam	Hard	Third round	70	130	Third round lost to (Belarus) Victoria Azarenka; 4–6, 2–6
14 September 2020 – 20 September 2020	Italian Open	Italy	WTA Premier 5	Clay	Did not play	0	1	First round lost to (Netherlands) Arantxa Rus; 6–7^{(5–7)}, 3–6
27 September 2020 – 11 October 2020	French Open	France	Grand Slam	Clay	Fourth round	240	2000	Winner defeated (United States) Sofia Kenin; 6–4, 6–1
Total year-end points							2432	

=== Doubles schedule ===
Date	Tournament	Location	Category	Surface	Previous result	Previous points	New points	Outcome
24 August 2020 – 30 August 2020	Cincinnati Open	United States	WTA Premier 5	Hard	Did not play	0	350	Semifinals lost to (China) Xu Yifan / (United States) Nicole Melichar-Martinez; 4–6, 5–7
27 September 2020 – 11 October 2020	French Open	France	Grand Slam	Clay	Did not play	0	780	Semifinals lost to (United States) Desirae Krawczyk / (Chile) Alexa Guarachi; 6–7^{(5–7)}, 6–1, 4–6
Total year-end points							1130	

=== Mixed doubles schedule ===
Date	Tournament	Location	Category	Surface	Previous result	Outcome
20 January 2020 – 2 February 2020	Australian Open	Australia	Grand Slam	Hard	Second round	Quarterfinals lost to (Australia) Astra Sharma / (Australia) John-Patrick Smith; 6–3, 6–7^{(4–7)}, [3–10]

== Yearly records ==
=== Top 10 wins ===
==== Singles ====
#	Opponent	Rank	Tournament	Surface	Round	Score	IŚR
1.	(Romania) Simona Halep	No. 2	French Open	Clay	Fourth round	6–1, 6–2	No. 54
2.	(United States) Sofia Kenin	No. 6	French Open	Clay	Final	6–4, 6–1	No. 54

=== Finals ===
==== Singles: 1 (1 title) ====
Legend Grand Slam tournaments (1–0) WTA Tour Championships (0–0) WTA Elite Trophy (0–0) WTA 1000 (0–0) WTA 500 (0–0) WTA 250 (0–0)	Finals by surface Hard (0–0) Clay (1–0) Grass (0–0)	Finals by setting Outdoor (1–0) Indoor (0–0)

Result	W–L	Date	Tournament	Tier	Surface	Opponent	Score
Win	1–0	Oct 2020	French Open	Grand Slam	Clay	(United States) Sofia Kenin	6–4, 6–1

=== Earnings ===
#	Tournament	Singles Prize money	Doubles Prize money	Mixed doubles Prize money	Year-to-date
1.	Australian Open	$207,843	$0	$8,316	$216,159
2.	Qatar Open	$17,800	$0	$0	$233,959
3.	Cincinnati Open	$11,000	$12,500	$0	$257,459
4.	US Open	$163,000	$0	$0	$420,459
5.	Italian Open	$11,160	$0	$0	$431,619
6.	French Open	$1,768,468	$61,126	$0	$2,261,213
Total prize money		$2,179,271	$73,626	$8,316	$2,261,213
