= 2020 US Open Series =

In tennis, the 2020 US Open Series was the seventeenth edition of the US Open Series, which comprised a group of hard court tournaments that started on August 22, 2020, in Western & Southern Open (to be held in New York City) hosting both a men's and women's event. The series was headlined by lone ATP Tour Masters 1000 and WTA Premier 5 events.

== Tournament schedule ==
Due to the impact of the COVID-19 pandemic in sporting industry, many US Open Series tennis events were scheduled from July 13 to August 21, 2020, have been cancelled due to the outbreak of the virus as in which resulted to postpone them in the 2021 tennis season. The second week would have planned a week break to avoid conflicting with the opening ceremony of 2020 Summer Olympics, since the Olympics itself also postponed to 2021.

Legend
Grand Slam Event
ATP Masters 1000 and WTA Premier 5
ATP Tour 500 and WTA Premier
ATP Tour 250 and WTA International

Week	Date	Men's Events	Women's Events
1	August 24 – August 30	Cincinnati; Western & Southern Open; 2020 Champion: (Serbia) Novak Djokovic	Cincinnati; Western & Southern Open; 2020 Champion: (Belarus) Victoria Azarenka
2–3	August 31 – September 13	New York; US Open; 2020 Champion: (Austria) Dominic Thiem	New York; US Open; 2020 Champion: (Japan) Naomi Osaka

== Week 1 ==
=== ATP – Western & Southern Open (Cincinnati) ===
Daniil Medvedev was the defending champion, but lost in the quarterfinals to Roberto Bautista Agut.

Novak Djokovic won the title, defeating Milos Raonic in the final, 1–6, 6–3, 6–4.

==== Main Draw Finals ====
Quarterfinals
1	(Serbia) Novak Djokovic	6	6
(Germany) Jan-Lennard Struff	3	1
3	(Russia) Daniil Medvedev	6	4	3
8	(Spain) Roberto Bautista Agut	1	6	6
(United States) Reilly Opelka	6^{r}
4	(Greece) Stefanos Tsitsipas	5
(Canada) Milos Raonic	4	7^{7}	7
(Serbia) Filip Krajinović	6	6^{2}	5

Semifinals
1	(Serbia) Novak Djokovic	4	6	7^{7}
8	(Spain) Roberto Bautista Agut	6	4	6^{0}
4	(Greece) Stefanos Tsitsipas	6^{5}	3
(Canada) Milos Raonic	7^{7}	6

Final
1	(Serbia) Novak Djokovic	1	6	6
(Canada) Milos Raonic	6	3	4

=== WTA – Western & Southern Open (Cincinnati) ===
Madison Keys was the defending champion but lost in the second round to Ons Jabeur.

Victoria Azarenka won the title via walkover, after Naomi Osaka withdrew from the final with a hamstring injury.

==== Main Draw Finals ====
Quarterfinals
14	(Belgium) Elise Mertens	6	6
Q	(United States) Jessica Pegula	1	3
4/WC	(Japan) Naomi Osaka	4	6	7
12	(Estonia) Anett Kontaveit	6	2	5
8	(United Kingdom) Johanna Konta	6	6
13	(Greece) Maria Sakkari	4	3
(Tunisia) Ons Jabeur	6^{9}	2
(Belarus) Victoria Azarenka	7^{11}	6

Semifinals
14	(Belgium) Elise Mertens	2	6^{5}
4/WC	(Japan) Naomi Osaka	6	7^{7}
8	(United Kingdom) Johanna Konta	6	4	1
(Belarus) Victoria Azarenka	4	6	6

Final
4/WC	(Japan) Naomi Osaka
(Belarus) Victoria Azarenka	w/o

== Weeks 2-3 ==
=== ATP – US Open (New York) ===
Rafael Nadal was the defending champion, but chose not to participate due to safety concerns related to the ongoing COVID-19 pandemic and the short amount of time between the US Open and the rescheduled European clay season.

Dominic Thiem won his first Grand Slam, defeating Alexander Zverev in the final, 2–6, 4–6, 6–4, 6–3, 7–6^{(8–6)}.

==== Main Draw Finals ====
Quarterfinals
20	(Spain) Pablo Carreño Busta	3	7^{7}	7^{7}	0	6
12	(Canada) Denis Shapovalov	6	6^{5}	6^{4}	6	3
27	(Croatia) Borna Ćorić	6	6^{5}	6^{1}	3
5	(Germany) Alexander Zverev	1	7^{7}	7^{7}	6
10	(Russia) Andrey Rublev	6^{6}	3	6^{5}
3	(Russia) Daniil Medvedev	7^{8}	6	7^{7}
21	(Australia) Alex de Minaur	1	2	4
2	(Austria) Dominic Thiem	6	6	6

Semifinals
20	(Spain) Pablo Carreño Busta	6	6	3	4	3
5	(Germany) Alexander Zverev	3	2	6	6	6
3	(Russia) Daniil Medvedev	2	6^{7}	6^{5}
2	(Austria) Dominic Thiem	6	7^{9}	7^{7}

Final
5	(Germany) Alexander Zverev	6	6	4	3	6^{6}
2	(Austria) Dominic Thiem	2	4	6	6	7^{8}

=== WTA – US Open (New York) ===
Bianca Andreescu was the defending champion, but she withdrew before the tournament began due to travel concerns related to the ongoing COVID-19 pandemic.

Naomi Osaka defeated Victoria Azarenka in the final, 1–6, 6–3, 6–3.

==== Main Draw Finals ====
Quarterfinals
28	(United States) Jennifer Brady	6	6
23	(Kazakhstan) Yulia Putintseva	3	2
4	(Japan) Naomi Osaka	6	6
(United States) Shelby Rogers	3	4
PR	(Bulgaria) Tsvetana Pironkova	6	3	2
3	(United States) Serena Williams	4	6	6
(Belarus) Victoria Azarenka	6	6
16	(Belgium) Elise Mertens	1	0

Semifinals
28	(United States) Jennifer Brady	6^{1}	6	3
4	(Japan) Naomi Osaka	7^{7}	3	6
3	(United States) Serena Williams	6	3	3
(Belarus) Victoria Azarenka	1	6	6

Final
4	(Japan) Naomi Osaka	1	6	6
(Belarus) Victoria Azarenka	6	3	3
