= 2019 Western & Southern Open – Women's doubles =

Women's doubles
- 2019 Western & Southern Open

Final
- Champions: (Czech Republic) Lucie Hradecká (Slovenia) Andreja Klepač
- Runners-up: (Germany) Anna-Lena Grönefeld (Netherlands) Demi Schuurs
- Score: 6–4, 6–1

Details
- Seeds: 8

Events
Singles	men	women
Doubles	men	women
← 2018 ·	Western & Southern Open	· 2020 →

Lucie Hradecká and Ekaterina Makarova were the defending champions, but Makarova could not participate this year due to injury. Hradecká played alongside Andreja Klepač and successfully defended her title, defeating Anna-Lena Grönefeld and Demi Schuurs in the final, 6–4, 6–1.

== Seeds ==
The top four seeds received a bye into the second round.

1. (Chinese Taipei) Hsieh Su-wei / (Czech Republic) Barbora Strýcová (quarterfinals, withdrew)
2. (Belgium) Elise Mertens / (Belarus) Aryna Sabalenka (second round)
3. (Czech Republic) Barbora Krejčíková / (Czech Republic) Kateřina Siniaková (quarterfinals)
4. (Canada) Gabriela Dabrowski / (China) Xu Yifan (second round)
5. (Germany) Anna-Lena Grönefeld / (Netherlands) Demi Schuurs (final)
6. (Chinese Taipei) Chan Hao-ching / (Chinese Taipei) Latisha Chan (first round)
7. (United States) Nicole Melichar / (Czech Republic) Květa Peschke (second round)
8. (Czech Republic) Lucie Hradecká / (Slovenia) Andreja Klepač (champions)

== Draw ==
=== Key ===
- Q = Qualifier
- WC = Wild card
- LL = Lucky loser
- Alt = Alternate
- ITF = ITF entry
- PR = Protected ranking
- SR = Special ranking
- SE = Special exempt
- JE = Junior exempt
- JR = Junior Accelerator Programme entrant
- CO = College Accelerator Programme entrant
- NG = Next Gen Accelerator Program entrant
- w/o = Walkover
- r = Retired
- d = Defaulted

=== Finals ===
Semifinals
8	(Czech Republic) Lucie Hradecká (Slovenia) Andreja Klepač	7^{9}	7
WC	(Czech Republic) Karolína Plíšková (Czech Republic) Kristýna Plíšková	6^{7}	5
5	(Germany) Anna-Lena Grönefeld (Netherlands) Demi Schuurs	7^{7}	7^{7}
(United States) Bethanie Mattek-Sands (United States) CoCo Vandeweghe	6^{5}	6^{4}

Final
8	(Czech Republic) Lucie Hradecká (Slovenia) Andreja Klepač	6	6
5	(Germany) Anna-Lena Grönefeld (Netherlands) Demi Schuurs	4	1

=== Top half ===
First round
(Romania) R Olaru (China) Z Yang	6	2	[8]
(Estonia) A Kontaveit (Greece) M Sakkari	4	6	[10]
(United States) R Atawo (China) X Han	1	3
(Ukraine) L Kichenok (Latvia) J Ostapenko	6	6
(Germany) J Görges (Germany) A Kerber	5	3
8	(Czech Republic) L Hradecká (Slovenia) A Klepač	7	6
WC	(United States) J Brady (United States) J Pegula	2	7^{9}	[10]
(Croatia) D Jurak (Spain) MJ Martínez Sánchez	6	6^{7}	[4]
(Ukraine) N Kichenok (United States) A Spears	5	3
WC	(Czech Republic) Ka Plíšková (Czech Republic) Kr Plíšková	7	6
(Croatia) P Martić (China) S Zhang	3	4
7	(United States) N Melichar (Czech Republic) K Peschke	6	6

Second round
1	(Chinese Taipei) S-w Hsieh (Czech Republic) B Strýcová	6	6
(Estonia) A Kontaveit (Greece) M Sakkari	4	3
(Ukraine) L Kichenok (Latvia) J Ostapenko	2	3
8	(Czech Republic) L Hradecká (Slovenia) A Klepač	6	6
3	(Czech Republic) B Krejčíková (Czech Republic) K Siniaková	6	5	[10]
WC	(United States) J Brady (United States) J Pegula	3	7	[8]
WC	(Czech Republic) Ka Plíšková (Czech Republic) Kr Plíšková	6	7^{9}
7	(United States) N Melichar (Czech Republic) K Peschke	3	6^{7}

Quarterfinals
1	(Chinese Taipei) S-w Hsieh (Czech Republic) B Strýcová
8	(Czech Republic) L Hradecká (Slovenia) A Klepač	w/o
3	(Czech Republic) B Krejčíková (Czech Republic) K Siniaková	5	6	[6]
WC	(Czech Republic) Ka Plíšková (Czech Republic) Kr Plíšková	7	2	[10]

Semifinals
8	(Czech Republic) L Hradecká (Slovenia) A Klepač	7^{9}	7
WC	(Czech Republic) Ka Plíšková (Czech Republic) Kr Plíšková	6^{7}	5

=== Bottom half ===
First round
5	(Germany) A-L Grönefeld (Netherlands) D Schuurs	6	4	[10]
(United States) D Krawczyk (Poland) A Rosolska	2	6	[8]
(Netherlands) K Bertens (Croatia) D Vekić	4	6	[10]
(China) Y Duan (China) S Zheng	6	3	[7]
WC	(United States) C McNally (United States) A Riske	7^{7}	6
(Japan) S Aoyama (Serbia) A Krunić	6^{0}	4
6	(Chinese Taipei) H-c Chan (Chinese Taipei) L Chan	3	6	[7]
(United States) B Mattek-Sands (United States) C Vandeweghe	6	3	[10]
(Australia) M Adamczak (United States) K Christian	6	7
(Belarus) L Marozava (Slovenia) K Srebotnik	2	5
(Russia) V Kudermetova (Kazakhstan) G Voskoboeva	4	5
(France) A Cornet (France) K Mladenovic	6	7

Second round
5	(Germany) A-L Grönefeld (Netherlands) D Schuurs	w/o
(Netherlands) K Bertens (Croatia) D Vekić
WC	(United States) C McNally (United States) A Riske	6^{5}	6	[17]
4	(Canada) G Dabrowski (China) Y Xu	7^{7}	4	[15]
(United States) B Mattek-Sands (United States) C Vandeweghe	6	6
(Australia) M Adamczak (United States) K Christian	2	3
(France) A Cornet (France) K Mladenovic	4	6	[10]
2	(Belgium) E Mertens (Belarus) A Sabalenka	6	2	[6]

Quarterfinals
5	(Germany) A-L Grönefeld (Netherlands) D Schuurs	7	4	[10]
WC	(United States) C McNally (United States) A Riske	5	6	[7]
(United States) B Mattek-Sands (United States) C Vandeweghe	6	6
(France) A Cornet (France) K Mladenovic	2	3

Semifinals
5	(Germany) A-L Grönefeld (Netherlands) D Schuurs	7^{7}	7^{7}
(United States) B Mattek-Sands (United States) C Vandeweghe	6^{5}	6^{4}
