= 2019 Western & Southern Open – Women's singles =

Women's singles
- 2019 Western & Southern Open

Final
- Champion: (United States) Madison Keys
- Runner-up: (Russia) Svetlana Kuznetsova
- Score: 7–5, 7–6^{(7–5)}

Details
- Draw: 56 (12 Q / 5 WC )
- Seeds: 16

Events
Singles	men	women
Doubles	men	women
- Western & Southern Open

Madison Keys defeated Svetlana Kuznetsova in the final, 7–5, 7–6^{(7–5)} to win the women's singles tennis title at the 2019 Cincinnati Masters.

Kiki Bertens was the defending champion, but lost in the second round to Venus Williams.

Naomi Osaka retained the world No. 1 singles ranking after the tournament. Ashleigh Barty and Karolína Plíšková were also in contention for the top ranking.

This tournament marked Maria Sharapova's final WTA Tour-level victory before her retirement; she defeated Alison Riske in the first round, before losing to Barty in the second round.

== Seeds ==
The top eight seeds received a bye into the second round.

1. (Australia) Ashleigh Barty (semifinals)
2. (Japan) Naomi Osaka (quarterfinals, retired)
3. (Czech Republic) Karolína Plíšková (quarterfinals)
4. (Romania) Simona Halep (third round)
5. (Netherlands) Kiki Bertens (second round)
6. (Czech Republic) Petra Kvitová (second round)
7. (Ukraine) Elina Svitolina (third round)
8. (United States) Sloane Stephens (third round)

9. (Belarus) Aryna Sabalenka (third round)
10. (United States) Serena Williams (withdrew)
11. (Latvia) Anastasija Sevastova (first round)
12. (Switzerland) Belinda Bencic (first round, retired)
13. (Germany) Angelique Kerber (first round)
14. (United Kingdom) Johanna Konta (first round)
15. (China) Wang Qiang (first round)
16. (United States) Madison Keys (champion)

Click on the seed number of a player to go to their draw section.

== Draw ==
Key

- Q = Qualifier
- WC = Wild card
- LL = Lucky loser
- Alt = Alternate
- ITF = ITF entry
- PR = Protected ranking
- SR = Special ranking
- SE = Special exempt
- JE = Junior exempt
- JR = Junior Accelerator Programme entrant
- CO = College Accelerator Programme entrant
- NG = Next Gen Accelerator Program entrant
- w/o = Walkover
- r = Retired
- d = Defaulted

=== Finals ===
Quarterfinals
1	(Australia) Ashleigh Barty	5	6	6
(Greece) Maria Sakkari	7	2	0
3	(Czech Republic) Karolína Plíšková	6	6^{2}	3
WC	(Russia) Svetlana Kuznetsova	3	7^{7}	6
(United States) Venus Williams	2	3
16	(United States) Madison Keys	6	6
(United States) Sofia Kenin	6	1	2
2	(Japan) Naomi Osaka	4	6	0^{r}

Semifinals
1	(Australia) Ashleigh Barty	2	4
WC	(Russia) Svetlana Kuznetsova	6	6
16	(United States) Madison Keys	7	6
(United States) Sofia Kenin	5	4

Final
WC	(Russia) Svetlana Kuznetsova	5	6^{5}
16	(United States) Madison Keys	7	7^{7}

=== Top half ===
==== Section 1 ====
First round
WC	(Russia) M Sharapova	6	7^{7}
WC	(United States) A Riske	3	6^{4}
(France) C Garcia	6^{1}	1
Q	(Poland) I Świątek	7^{7}	6
(Estonia) A Kontaveit	7^{9}	6
13	(Germany) A Kerber	6^{7}	2
9	(Belarus) A Sabalenka	6	6
(Croatia) P Martić	1	4
(Slovakia) V Kužmová	3	1
(China) S Zheng	6	6
(Greece) M Sakkari	6	6
(Italy) C Giorgi	3	0

Second round
1	(Australia) A Barty	6	6
WC	(Russia) M Sharapova	4	1
Q	(Poland) I Świątek	4	6^{2}
(Estonia) A Kontaveit	6	7^{7}
9	(Belarus) A Sabalenka	6	6
(China) S Zheng	4	3
(Greece) M Sakkari	6	2	6
6	(Czech Republic) P Kvitová	4	6	3

Third round
1	(Australia) A Barty	4	7	7
(Estonia) A Kontaveit	6	5	5
9	(Belarus) A Sabalenka	7^{7}	4	4
(Greece) M Sakkari	6^{4}	6	6

Quarterfinals
1	(Australia) A Barty	5	6	6
(Greece) M Sakkari	7	2	0

==== Section 2 ====
First round
LL	(China) Y Wang	3	7	6
LL	(Puerto Rico) M Puig	6	5	3
WC	(United States) B Pera	2	3
Q	(Russia) V Kudermetova	6	6
Q	(Sweden) R Peterson	6	3	7
14	(United Kingdom) J Konta	3	6	5
11	(Latvia) A Sevastova	6^{3}	7^{7}	4
WC	(Russia) S Kuznetsova	7^{7}	6^{4}	6
(Ukraine) D Yastremska	6	6
(Denmark) C Wozniacki	4	4
(Latvia) J Ostapenko	2	7^{7}	3
(Kazakhstan) Y Putintseva	6	6^{3}	6

Second round
3	(Czech Republic) Ka Plíšková	6	6
LL	(China) Y Wang	1	3
Q	(Russia) V Kudermetova	6	5	2
Q	(Sweden) R Peterson	2	7	6
WC	(Russia) S Kuznetsova	4	7^{9}	6
(Ukraine) D Yastremska	6	6^{7}	2
(Kazakhstan) Y Putintseva	6	4	3
8	(United States) S Stephens	2	6	6

Third round
3	(Czech Republic) Ka Plíšková	7	6
Q	(Sweden) R Peterson	5	4
WC	(Russia) S Kuznetsova	6	6
8	(United States) S Stephens	1	2

Quarterfinals
3	(Czech Republic) Ka Plíšková	6	6^{2}	3
WC	(Russia) S Kuznetsova	3	7^{7}	6

=== Bottom half ===
==== Section 3 ====
First round
(United States) V Williams	7	6
Q	(United States) L Davis	5	2
(Czech Republic) K Siniaková	4	3
(Croatia) D Vekić	6	6
(Belarus) V Azarenka	6	1
12	(Switzerland) B Bencic	4	0^{r}
16	(United States) M Keys	6^{4}	7^{7}	6
(Spain) G Muguruza	7^{7}	6^{5}	4
LL	(Czech Republic) B Strýcová	4	6^{9}
(Russia) D Kasatkina	6	7^{11}
(Russia) E Alexandrova	6	6
(Spain) C Suárez Navarro	4	1

Second round
5	(Netherlands) K Bertens	3	6	6^{4}
(United States) V Williams	6	3	7^{7}
(Croatia) D Vekić	6	7
(Belarus) V Azarenka	2	5
16	(United States) M Keys	6	6
(Russia) D Kasatkina	4	1
(Russia) E Alexandrova	6	5	4
4	(Romania) S Halep	3	7	6

Third round
(United States) V Williams	2	6	6
(Croatia) D Vekić	6	3	3
16	(United States) M Keys	6	3	7
4	(Romania) S Halep	1	6	5

Quarterfinals
(United States) V Williams	2	3
16	(United States) M Keys	6	6

==== Section 4 ====
First round
(Belgium) E Mertens	7	6
WC	(United States) C McNally	5	0
(United States) S Kenin	6	7^{8}
(Germany) J Görges	4	6^{6}
Q	(Kazakhstan) Z Diyas	7	6
LL	(United States) J Pegula	5	4
15	(China) Q Wang	3	4
(Chinese Taipei) S-w Hsieh	6	6
Q	(Tunisia) O Jabeur	2	2
Q	(United States) J Brady	6	6
(Belarus) A Sasnovich	6	4	6
Q	(Australia) A Sharma	1	6	1

Second round
7	(Ukraine) E Svitolina	6	6
(Belgium) E Mertens	4	1
(United States) S Kenin	6	6
Q	(Kazakhstan) Z Diyas	4	1
(Chinese Taipei) S-w Hsieh	7^{11}	6
Q	(United States) J Brady	6^{9}	3
(Belarus) A Sasnovich	6^{3}	6	2
2	(Japan) N Osaka	7^{7}	2	6

Third round
7	(Ukraine) E Svitolina	3	6^{3}
(United States) S Kenin	6	7^{7}
(Chinese Taipei) S-w Hsieh	6^{3}	7	2
2	(Japan) N Osaka	7^{7}	5	6

Quarterfinals
(United States) S Kenin	6	1	2
2	(Japan) N Osaka	4	6	0^{r}

== Qualifying ==
=== Seeds ===
1. (Czech Republic) Barbora Strýcová (qualifying competition, lucky loser)
2. (China) Zhang Shuai (first round)
3. (Puerto Rico) Monica Puig (qualifying competition, lucky loser)
4. (Russia) Anastasia Pavlyuchenkova (first round)
5. (France) Kristina Mladenovic (first round)
6. (China) Wang Yafan (qualifying competition, lucky loser)
7. (France) Alizé Cornet (first round)
8. (Slovenia) Polona Hercog (withdrew)
9. (United States) Jessica Pegula (qualifying competition, lucky loser)
10. (Russia) Veronika Kudermetova (qualified)
11. (Switzerland) Jil Teichmann (first round)
12. (Russia) Margarita Gasparyan (first round)
13. (Tunisia) Ons Jabeur (qualified)
14. (Kazakhstan) Elena Rybakina (first round)
15. (Poland) Iga Świątek (qualified)
16. (United States) Lauren Davis (qualified)

=== Qualifiers ===
1. (Sweden) Rebecca Peterson
2. (United States) Lauren Davis
3. (Russia) Veronika Kudermetova
4. (Kazakhstan) Zarina Diyas
5. (United States) Jennifer Brady
6. (Poland) Iga Świątek
7. (Tunisia) Ons Jabeur
8. (Australia) Astra Sharma

=== Lucky losers ===
1. (Puerto Rico) Monica Puig
2. (Czech Republic) Barbora Strýcová
3. (China) Wang Yafan
4. (United States) Jessica Pegula

=== Qualifying draw ===
==== First qualifier ====
First round
1	(Czech Republic) Barbora Strýcová	7^{7}	3	6
(Estonia) Kaia Kanepi	6^{3}	6	3
(Sweden) Rebecca Peterson	6	7
12	(Russia) Margarita Gasparyan	1	5

Qualifying competition
1	(Czech Republic) Barbora Strýcová	2	1
(Sweden) Rebecca Peterson	6	6

==== Second qualifier ====
First round
2	(China) Zhang Shuai	4	6^{5}
(Czech Republic) Kristýna Plíšková	6	7^{7}
WC	(United States) Kristie Ahn	6	6^{7}	2
16	(United States) Lauren Davis	2	7^{9}	6

Qualifying competition
(Czech Republic) Kristýna Plíšková	1	4
16	(United States) Lauren Davis	6	6

==== Third qualifier ====
First round
3	(Puerto Rico) Monica Puig	6^{2}	6	6
(Russia) Anastasia Potapova	7^{7}	1	4
WC	(Australia) Destanee Aiava	4	6	2
10	(Russia) Veronika Kudermetova	6	2	6

Qualifying competition
3	(Puerto Rico) Monica Puig	2	1
10	(Russia) Veronika Kudermetova	6	6

==== Fourth qualifier ====
First round
4	(Russia) Anastasia Pavlyuchenkova	1	6^{5}
(Kazakhstan) Zarina Diyas	6	7^{7}
(Romania) Mihaela Buzărnescu	3	6^{5}
9	(United States) Jessica Pegula	6	7^{7}

Qualifying competition
(Kazakhstan) Zarina Diyas	6^{4}	7^{7}	6
9	(United States) Jessica Pegula	7^{7}	6^{3}	4

==== Fifth qualifier ====
First round
5	(France) Kristina Mladenovic	2	5
(Poland) Magda Linette	6	7
(United States) Jennifer Brady	1	6	6
11	(Switzerland) Jil Teichmann	6	1	2

Qualifying competition
(Poland) Magda Linette	6	3	4
(United States) Jennifer Brady	2	6	6

==== Sixth qualifier ====
First round
6	(China) Wang Yafan	6	6
WC	(United States) CoCo Vandeweghe	2	2
(Ukraine) Kateryna Kozlova	2	7^{7}	4
15	(Poland) Iga Świątek	6	6^{0}	6

Qualifying competition
6	(China) Wang Yafan	4	6	4
15	(Poland) Iga Świątek	6	3	6

==== Seventh qualifier ====
First round
7	(France) Alizé Cornet	6^{5}	3
(Germany) Andrea Petkovic	7^{7}	6
WC	(United States) Shelby Rogers	5	6	6^{5}
13	(Tunisia) Ons Jabeur	7	2	7^{7}

Qualifying competition
(Germany) Andrea Petkovic	3	0
13	(Tunisia) Ons Jabeur	6	6

==== Eighth qualifier ====
First round
Alt	(Australia) Astra Sharma	6	6
(Switzerland) Viktorija Golubic	3	3
PR	(United States) Bethanie Mattek-Sands	6	6
14	(Kazakhstan) Elena Rybakina	3	2

Qualifying competition
Alt	(Australia) Astra Sharma	6	6
PR	(United States) Bethanie Mattek-Sands	4	4

== Sources ==
- Main Draw
- Qualifying Draw
