= 2019 Western & Southern Open – Men's doubles =

Men's doubles
- 2019 Western & Southern Open

Final
- Champions: (Croatia) Ivan Dodig (Slovakia) Filip Polášek
- Runners-up: (Colombia) Juan Sebastián Cabal (Colombia) Robert Farah
- Score: 4–6, 6–4, [10–6]

Details
- Draw: 32 (3 WC )
- Seeds: 8

Events
Singles	men	women
Doubles	men	women
← 2018 ·	Western & Southern Open	· 2020 →

Jamie Murray and Bruno Soares were the defending champions, but they chose not to participate together this year. Murray played alongside Neal Skupski, but lost in the semifinals to Ivan Dodig and Filip Polášek. Soares played alongside Mate Pavić, but lost in the semifinals to Juan Sebastián Cabal and Robert Farah.

Dodig and Polášek went on to win the title, defeating Cabal and Farah in the final, 4–6, 6–4, [10–6].

== Seeds ==
1. (Colombia) Juan Sebastián Cabal / (Colombia) Robert Farah (final)
2. (Poland) Łukasz Kubot / (Brazil) Marcelo Melo (quarterfinals)
3. (South Africa) Raven Klaasen / (New Zealand) Michael Venus (quarterfinals)
4. (Netherlands) Jean-Julien Rojer / (Romania) Horia Tecău (first round)
5. (France) Pierre-Hugues Herbert / (France) Nicolas Mahut (second round)
6. (Croatia) Mate Pavić / (Brazil) Bruno Soares (semifinals)
7. (Finland) Henri Kontinen / (Australia) John Peers (quarterfinals)
8. (United States) Bob Bryan / (United States) Mike Bryan (second round)

== Draw ==
=== Key ===
- Q = Qualifier
- WC = Wild card
- LL = Lucky loser
- Alt = Alternate
- SE = Special exempt
- PR = Protected ranking
- ITF = ITF entry
- JE = Junior exempt
- w/o = Walkover
- r = Retired
- d = Defaulted
- SR = Special ranking

=== Finals ===
Semifinals
1	(Colombia) Juan Sebastián Cabal (Colombia) Robert Farah	6	6
6	(Croatia) Mate Pavić (Brazil) Bruno Soares	3	2
(United Kingdom) Jamie Murray (United Kingdom) Neal Skupski	1	4
(Croatia) Ivan Dodig (Slovakia) Filip Polášek	6	6

Final
1	(Colombia) Juan Sebastián Cabal (Colombia) Robert Farah	6	4	[6]
(Croatia) Ivan Dodig (Slovakia) Filip Polášek	4	6	[10]

=== Top half ===
First round
1	(Colombia) JS Cabal (Colombia) R Farah	6	7^{10}
(Australia) N Kyrgios (Greece) S Tsitsipas	1	6^{8}
Alt	(India) R Bopanna (Canada) D Shapovalov	7^{8}	7
(United States) R Ram (United Kingdom) J Salisbury	6^{6}	5
Alt	(France) A Mannarino (France) L Pouille	7^{8}	6^{1}	[8]
(Argentina) D Schwartzman (Argentina) H Zeballos	6^{6}	7^{7}	[10]
(Canada) F Auger-Aliassime (Italy) M Berrettini	6^{5}	6	[4]
7	(Finland) H Kontinen (Australia) J Peers	7^{7}	2	[10]
3	(South Africa) R Klaasen (New Zealand) M Venus	6	6
(Serbia) L Đere (Serbia) D Lajović	3	1
(United States) A Krajicek (France) É Roger-Vasselin	6	6^{4}	[11]
(Argentina) G Pella (Portugal) J Sousa	0	7^{7}	[9]
(Brazil) M Demoliner (Russia) D Medvedev	7	1	[10]
(Netherlands) R Haase (Netherlands) W Koolhof	5	6	[6]
(Germany) K Krawietz (Germany) A Mies	6^{2}	6	[7]
6	(Croatia) M Pavić (Brazil) B Soares	7^{7}	4	[10]

Second round
1	(Colombia) JS Cabal (Colombia) R Farah	7^{7}	6^{5}	[10]
Alt	(India) R Bopanna (Canada) D Shapovalov	6^{3}	7^{7}	[8]
(Argentina) D Schwartzman (Argentina) H Zeballos	1	6	[10]
7	(Finland) H Kontinen (Australia) J Peers	6	3	[12]
3	(South Africa) R Klaasen (New Zealand) M Venus	6	6
(United States) A Krajicek (France) É Roger-Vasselin	4	4
(Brazil) M Demoliner (Russia) D Medvedev	5	6^{5}
6	(Croatia) M Pavić (Brazil) B Soares	7	7^{7}

Quarterfinals
1	(Colombia) JS Cabal (Colombia) R Farah	6	6
7	(Finland) H Kontinen (Australia) J Peers	4	2
3	(South Africa) R Klaasen (New Zealand) M Venus	1	3
6	(Croatia) M Pavić (Brazil) B Soares	6	6

Semifinals
1	(Colombia) JS Cabal (Colombia) R Farah	6	6
6	(Croatia) M Pavić (Brazil) B Soares	3	2

=== Bottom half ===
First round
5	(France) P-H Herbert (France) N Mahut	6	6^{6}	[12]
(Croatia) N Mektić (Croatia) F Škugor	3	7^{8}	[10]
WC	(United States) N Monroe (United States) T Sandgren	7^{7}	2	[8]
(United Kingdom) J Murray (United Kingdom) N Skupski	6^{3}	6	[10]
(Austria) O Marach (Austria) J Melzer	2	2
WC	(United States) R Harrison (United States) J Sock	6	6
PR	(Spain) F López (United Kingdom) A Murray	3	6	[10]
4	(Netherlands) J-J Rojer (Romania) H Tecău	6	3	[3]
8	(United States) B Bryan (United States) M Bryan	7^{7}	3	[10]
(France) J Chardy (France) F Martin	6^{4}	6	[7]
(Belgium) D Goffin (Poland) H Hurkacz	1	3
(Croatia) I Dodig (Slovakia) F Polášek	6	6
(Chile) C Garín (France) B Paire	7^{7}	6
(Moldova) R Albot (Russia) K Khachanov	6^{3}	4
WC	(Serbia) N Djokovic (Serbia) J Tipsarević	2	3
2	(Poland) Ł Kubot (Brazil) M Melo	6	6

Second round
5	(France) P-H Herbert (France) N Mahut	3	3
(United Kingdom) J Murray (United Kingdom) N Skupski	6	6
WC	(United States) R Harrison (United States) J Sock	6	3	[7]
PR	(Spain) F López (United Kingdom) A Murray	2	6	[10]
8	(United States) B Bryan (United States) M Bryan	4	2
(Croatia) I Dodig (Slovakia) F Polášek	6	6
(Chile) C Garín (France) B Paire	4	3
2	(Poland) Ł Kubot (Brazil) M Melo	6	6

Quarterfinals
(United Kingdom) J Murray (United Kingdom) N Skupski	6^{5}	7	[10]
PR	(Spain) F López (United Kingdom) A Murray	7^{7}	5	[4]
(Croatia) I Dodig (Slovakia) F Polášek	3	6	[10]
2	(Poland) Ł Kubot (Brazil) M Melo	6	4	[5]

Semifinals
(United Kingdom) J Murray (United Kingdom) N Skupski	1	4
(Croatia) I Dodig (Slovakia) F Polášek	6	6
