= 2020 Western & Southern Open – Women's singles =

Women's singles
- 2020 Western & Southern Open

Final
- Champion: (Belarus) Victoria Azarenka
- Runner-up: (Japan) Naomi Osaka
- Score: Walkover

Details
- Draw: 56 (12Q / 5WC)
- Seeds: 16

Events
Singles	men	women
Doubles	men	women
- Western & Southern Open

Victoria Azarenka won the women's singles tennis title at the 2020 Western & Southern Open, claiming victory via walkover after Naomi Osaka withdrew from the final with a hamstring injury. It was Azarenka's first singles title since the 2016 Miami Open, and her first since giving birth to her son, Leo, in December 2016.

Madison Keys was the defending champion, but she lost in the second round to Ons Jabeur.

== Seeds ==
The top eight seeds received a bye into the second round.

1. (Czech Republic) Karolína Plíšková (second round)
2. (United States) Sofia Kenin (second round)
3. (United States) Serena Williams (third round)
4. (Japan) Naomi Osaka (final; withdrew)
5. (Belarus) Aryna Sabalenka (third round)
6. (Czech Republic) Petra Kvitová (second round)
7. (United States) Madison Keys (second round)
8. (United Kingdom) Johanna Konta (semifinals)

9. (Kazakhstan) Elena Rybakina (first round)
10. (Czech Republic) Markéta Vondroušová (first round)
11. (United States) Alison Riske (first round)
12. (Estonia) Anett Kontaveit (quarterfinals)
13. (Greece) Maria Sakkari (quarterfinals)
14. (Belgium) Elise Mertens (semifinals)
15. (Croatia) Donna Vekić (first round)
16. (Ukraine) Dayana Yastremska (third round)

Click on the seed number of a player to go to their draw section.

== Draw ==
Key

- Q = Qualifier
- WC = Wild card
- LL = Lucky loser
- Alt = Alternate
- ITF = ITF entry
- PR = Protected ranking
- SR = Special ranking
- SE = Special exempt
- JE = Junior exempt
- JR = Junior Accelerator Programme entrant
- CO = College Accelerator Programme entrant
- NG = Next Gen Accelerator Program entrant
- w/o = Walkover
- r = Retired
- d = Defaulted

=== Finals ===
Quarterfinals
14	(Belgium) Elise Mertens	6	6
Q	(United States) Jessica Pegula	1	3
4/WC	(Japan) Naomi Osaka	4	6	7
12	(Estonia) Anett Kontaveit	6	2	5
8	(United Kingdom) Johanna Konta	6	6
13	(Greece) Maria Sakkari	4	3
(Tunisia) Ons Jabeur	6^{9}	2
(Belarus) Victoria Azarenka	7^{11}	6

Semifinals
14	(Belgium) Elise Mertens	2	6^{5}
4/WC	(Japan) Naomi Osaka	6	7^{7}
8	(United Kingdom) Johanna Konta	6	4	1
(Belarus) Victoria Azarenka	4	6	6

Final
4/WC	(Japan) Naomi Osaka
(Belarus) Victoria Azarenka	w/o

=== Top half ===
==== Section 1 ====
First round
(Russia) V Kudermetova	5	6	7
(Australia) A Tomljanović	7	3	5
(Latvia) A Sevastova	3	4
(France) K Mladenovic	6	6
(Sweden) R Peterson	0	2
14	(Belgium) E Mertens	6	6
11	(United States) A Riske	3	3
(United States) A Anisimova	6	6
(United States) J Brady	6^{5}	4
Q	(United States) J Pegula	7^{7}	6
Q	(United States) C Bellis	6	3	7^{7}
Q	(France) O Dodin	2	6	6^{1}

Second round
1	(Czech Republic) Ka Plíšková	5	4
(Russia) V Kudermetova	7	6
(France) K Mladenovic	1	7^{7}	3
14	(Belgium) E Mertens	6	6^{5}	6
(United States) A Anisimova	5	2
Q	(United States) J Pegula	7	6
Q	(United States) C Bellis	7^{7}	4	5
5	(Belarus) A Sabalenka	6^{1}	6	7

Third round
(Russia) V Kudermetova	2	3
14	(Belgium) E Mertens	6	6
Q	(United States) J Pegula	6	2	6
5	(Belarus) A Sabalenka	2	6	3

Quarterfinals
14	(Belgium) E Mertens	6	6
Q	(United States) J Pegula	1	3

==== Section 2 ====
First round
(Czech Republic) K Muchová	6	6
Q	(United States) A Li	4	4
(United Kingdom) H Watson	1	6	3
(United States) B Pera	6	3	6
WC	(United States) V Williams	7	2	5
16	(Ukraine) D Yastremska	5	6	7
12	(Estonia) A Kontaveit	6	6
LL	(Russia) D Kasatkina	3	1
(United States) D Collins	3	3
Q	(Switzerland) J Teichmann	6	6
(Czech Republic) M Bouzková	6	7
Q	(Russia) A Kalinskaya	1	5

Second round
4/WC	(Japan) N Osaka	6^{5}	6	6
(Czech Republic) K Muchová	7^{7}	4	2
(United States) B Pera	6^{5}	6	3
16	(Ukraine) D Yastremska	7^{7}	4	6
12	(Estonia) A Kontaveit	6	6
Q	(Switzerland) J Teichmann	3	4
(Czech Republic) M Bouzková	2	7	6
6	(Czech Republic) P Kvitová	6	5	2

Third round
4/WC	(Japan) N Osaka	6	6
16	(Ukraine) D Yastremska	3	1
12	(Estonia) A Kontaveit	6	6
(Czech Republic) M Bouzková	3	3

Quarterfinals
4/WC	(Japan) N Osaka	4	6	7
12	(Estonia) A Kontaveit	6	2	5

=== Bottom half ===
==== Section 3 ====
First round
(Czech Republic) K Siniaková	3	3
Q	(Belgium) K Flipkens	6	6
(Poland) M Linette	6	3	1
Q	(Russia) V Zvonareva	1	6	6
Q	(Germany) L Siegemund	6	6^{3}	6
10	(Czech Republic) M Vondroušová	3	7^{7}	4
13	(Greece) M Sakkari	6	6
(United States) C Gauff	1	3
(Kazakhstan) Y Putintseva	6	6
(China) S Zhang	4	3
Q	(Netherlands) A Rus	6	6
(Belgium) A Van Uytvanck	2	3

Second round
8	(United Kingdom) J Konta	6	6
Q	(Belgium) K Flipkens	2	0
Q	(Russia) V Zvonareva	6	6
Q	(Germany) L Siegemund	1	1
13	(Greece) M Sakkari	6	7^{11}
(Kazakhstan) Y Putintseva	4	6^{9}
Q	(Netherlands) A Rus	6^{6}	6	6^{0}
3	(United States) S Williams	7^{8}	3	7^{7}

Third round
8	(United Kingdom) J Konta	6	6
Q	(Russia) V Zvonareva	4	2
13	(Greece) M Sakkari	5	7^{7}	6
3	(United States) S Williams	7	6^{5}	1

Quarterfinals
8	(United Kingdom) J Konta	6	6
13	(Greece) M Sakkari	4	3

==== Section 4 ====
First round
Q	(Canada) L Fernandez	6	4	3
(Tunisia) O Jabeur	0	6	6
Q	(United States) C McHale	6	6
(Poland) I Świątek	2	4
(Russia) E Alexandrova	7	7^{8}
9	(Kazakhstan) E Rybakina	5	6^{6}
15	(Croatia) D Vekić	2	3
(Belarus) V Azarenka	6	6
WC	(United States) S Stephens	3	6^{4}
(France) C Garcia	6	7^{7}
(France) A Cornet	6	6
WC	(United States) C McNally	0	4

Second round
7	(United States) M Keys	4	1
(Tunisia) O Jabeur	6	6
Q	(United States) C McHale	6	7^{10}
(Russia) E Alexandrova	1	6^{8}
(Belarus) V Azarenka	6	7^{10}
(France) C Garcia	2	6^{8}
(France) A Cornet	6	7^{9}
2	(United States) S Kenin	1	6^{7}

Third round
(Tunisia) O Jabeur	6	6
Q	(United States) C McHale	3	0
(Belarus) V Azarenka	6	7
(France) A Cornet	4	5

Quarterfinals
(Tunisia) O Jabeur	6^{9}	2
(Belarus) V Azarenka	7^{11}	6

== Qualifying ==
=== Seeds ===
1. (Switzerland) Jil Teichmann (qualified)
2. (Russia) Anna Blinkova (first round)
3. (United States) Lauren Davis (first round)
4. (Kazakhstan) Zarina Diyas (first round)
5. (Germany) Laura Siegemund (qualified)
6. (Russia) Daria Kasatkina (qualifying competition, lucky loser)
7. (Netherlands) Arantxa Rus (qualified)
8. (Japan) Nao Hibino (first round)
9. (United States) Taylor Townsend (first round)
10. (Romania) Sorana Cîrstea (qualifying competition)
11. (Japan) Misaki Doi (first round)
12. (Belgium) Kirsten Flipkens (qualified)
13. (United States) Madison Brengle (first round)
14. (United States) Jessica Pegula (qualified)
15. (Slovakia) Viktória Kužmová (qualifying competition)
16. (Romania) Patricia Maria Țig (first round)
17. (Serbia) Nina Stojanović (qualifying competition)
18. (United States) Christina McHale (qualified)
19. (Puerto Rico) Monica Puig (first round)
20. (Montenegro) Danka Kovinić (first round)
21. (Spain) Paula Badosa (qualifying competition)
22. (United States) Shelby Rogers (qualifying competition)
23. (Italy) Jasmine Paolini (first round)
24. (United States) Kristie Ahn (qualifying competition)

=== Qualifiers ===
1. (Switzerland) Jil Teichmann
2. (Canada) Leylah Fernandez
3. (United States) Jessica Pegula
4. (United States) Ann Li
5. (Germany) Laura Siegemund
6. (United States) Christina McHale
7. (Netherlands) Arantxa Rus
8. (United States) Catherine Bellis
9. (Russia) Vera Zvonareva
10. (Russia) Anna Kalinskaya
11. (France) Océane Dodin
12. (Belgium) Kirsten Flipkens

=== Lucky loser ===
1. (Russia) Daria Kasatkina

=== Qualifying draw ===
==== First qualifier ====
First round
1	(Switzerland) Jil Teichmann	6	6
(Spain) Aliona Bolsova	2	2
(Russia) Margarita Gasparyan	3	6^{3}
22	(United States) Shelby Rogers	6	7^{7}

Qualifying competition
1	(Switzerland) Jil Teichmann	6	6
22	(United States) Shelby Rogers	3	4

==== Second qualifier ====
First round
2	(Russia) Anna Blinkova	1	4
(Canada) Leylah Fernandez	6	6
(Germany) Anna-Lena Friedsam	5	0
24	(United States) Kristie Ahn	7	6

Qualifying competition
(Canada) Leylah Fernandez	6	6
24	(United States) Kristie Ahn	4	1

==== Third qualifier ====
First round
3	(United States) Lauren Davis	4	1
(Russia) Liudmila Samsonova	6	6
(Russia) Varvara Gracheva	5	6^{8}
14	(United States) Jessica Pegula	7	7^{10}

Qualifying competition
(Russia) Liudmila Samsonova	3	6	2
14	(United States) Jessica Pegula	6	3	6

==== Fourth qualifier ====
First round
4	(Kazakhstan) Zarina Diyas	1	3
WC	(United States) Ann Li	6	6
(Belgium) Greet Minnen	5	2
15	(Slovakia) Viktória Kužmová	7	6

Qualifying competition
WC	(United States) Ann Li	6	7^{7}
15	(Slovakia) Viktória Kužmová	3	6^{5}

==== Fifth qualifier ====
First round
5	(Germany) Laura Siegemund	6	7
(Ukraine) Kateryna Kozlova	0	5
(United States) Caroline Dolehide	6	2	6
23	(Italy) Jasmine Paolini	3	6	4

Qualifying competition
5	(Germany) Laura Siegemund	6	6
(United States) Caroline Dolehide	3	3

==== Sixth qualifier ====
First round
6	(Russia) Daria Kasatkina	7^{7}	4	6
PR	(Ukraine) Kateryna Bondarenko	6^{1}	6	0
WC	(United States) Usue Maitane Arconada	2	6	4
18	(United States) Christina McHale	6	2	6

Qualifying competition
6	(Russia) Daria Kasatkina	3	5
18	(United States) Christina McHale	6	7

==== Seventh qualifier ====
First round
7	(Netherlands) Arantxa Rus	7	4	6
(Switzerland) Stefanie Vögele	5	6	1
(Russia) Vitalia Diatchenko	2	4
17	(Serbia) Nina Stojanović	6	6

Qualifying competition
7	(Netherlands) Arantxa Rus	6	6
17	(Serbia) Nina Stojanović	4	3

==== Eighth qualifier ====
First round
8	(Japan) Nao Hibino	7^{7}	3	3
(Belgium) Ysaline Bonaventure	6^{3}	6	6
WC	(United States) Catherine Bellis	6	7^{7}
13	(United States) Madison Brengle	3	6^{4}

Qualifying competition
(Belgium) Ysaline Bonaventure	6	4	1
WC	(United States) Catherine Bellis	4	6	6

==== Ninth qualifier ====
First round
9	(United States) Taylor Townsend	2	0
(Australia) Astra Sharma	6	6
(Russia) Vera Zvonareva	6	6
20	(Montenegro) Danka Kovinić	2	2

Qualifying competition
(Australia) Astra Sharma	4	2
(Russia) Vera Zvonareva	6	6

==== Tenth qualifier ====
First round
10	(Romania) Sorana Cîrstea	6	6
WC	(United States) Robin Montgomery	1	4
(Russia) Anna Kalinskaya	6	6
16	(Romania) Patricia Maria Țig	4	2

Qualifying competition
10	(Romania) Sorana Cîrstea	5	4
(Russia) Anna Kalinskaya	7	6

==== Eleventh qualifier ====
First round
11	(Japan) Misaki Doi	1	3
(France) Océane Dodin	6	6
(United States) Francesca Di Lorenzo	4	3
21	(Spain) Paula Badosa	6	6

Qualifying competition
(France) Océane Dodin	6	6
21	(Spain) Paula Badosa	4	1

==== Twelfth qualifier ====
First round
12	(Belgium) Kirsten Flipkens	5	7	7^{7}
(Ukraine) Katarina Zavatska	7	5	6^{2}
WC	(United States) Katie Volynets	4	7^{7}	6
19	(Puerto Rico) Monica Puig	6	6^{4}	3

Qualifying competition
12	(Belgium) Kirsten Flipkens	6	2
WC	(United States) Katie Volynets	1	0^{r}
