= 2020 Western & Southern Open – Women's doubles =

Women's doubles
- 2020 Western & Southern Open

Final
- Champions: (Czech Republic) Květa Peschke (Netherlands) Demi Schuurs
- Runners-up: (United States) Nicole Melichar (China) Xu Yifan
- Score: 6–1, 4–6, [10–4]

Details
- Draw: 32
- Seeds: 8

Events
Singles	men	women
Doubles	men	women
← 2019 ·	Western & Southern Open	· 2021 →

Lucie Hradecká and Andreja Klepač were the defending champions, but lost in the semifinals to Květa Peschke and Demi Schuurs.

Peschke and Schuurs went on to win the title, defeating Nicole Melichar and Xu Yifan in the final, 6–1, 4–6, [10–4].

== Seeds ==
1. (Belgium) Elise Mertens / (Belarus) Aryna Sabalenka (quarterfinals, withdrew)
2. (United States) Nicole Melichar / (China) Xu Yifan (final)
3. (Czech Republic) Květa Peschke / (Netherlands) Demi Schuurs (champions)
4. (United States) Bethanie Mattek-Sands / (China) Zhang Shuai (first round)
5. (Japan) Shuko Aoyama / (Japan) Ena Shibahara (second round)
6. (Belarus) Victoria Azarenka / (United States) Sofia Kenin (second round)
7. (Germany) Anna-Lena Friedsam / (Czech Republic) Kateřina Siniaková (first round)
8. (Czech Republic) Lucie Hradecká / (Slovenia) Andreja Klepač (semifinals)

== Draw ==
=== Key ===
- Q = Qualifier
- WC = Wild card
- LL = Lucky loser
- Alt = Alternate
- SE = Special exempt
- PR = Protected ranking
- ITF = ITF entry
- JE = Junior exempt
- w/o = Walkover
- r = Retired
- d = Defaulted
- SR = Special ranking

=== Finals ===
Semifinals
8	(Czech Republic) Lucie Hradecká (Slovenia) Andreja Klepač	2	1
3	(Czech Republic) Květa Peschke (Netherlands) Demi Schuurs	6	6
(Slovakia) Viktória Kužmová (Poland) Iga Świątek	4	5
2	(United States) Nicole Melichar (China) Xu Yifan	6	7

Final
3	(Czech Republic) Květa Peschke (Netherlands) Demi Schuurs	6	4	[10]
2	(United States) Nicole Melichar (China) Xu Yifan	1	6	[4]

=== Top half ===
First round
1	(Belgium) E Mertens (Belarus) A Sabalenka	6	6
WC	(United States) A Li (United States) B Pera	2	4
(Australia) Ar Rodionova (United States) S Santamaria	3	3
(Chile) A Guarachi (United States) D Krawczyk	6	6
(United States) J Brady (United States) C Dolehide	6	3	[10]
(United States) M Keys (United States) S Stephens	1	6	[6]
(Canada) S Fichman (Croatia) D Jurak	4	6^{2}
8	(Czech Republic) L Hradecká (Slovenia) A Klepač	6	7^{7}
3	(Czech Republic) K Peschke (Netherlands) D Schuurs	1	6	[10]
(Georgia (country)) O Kalashnikova (Russia) A Kudryavtseva	6	4	[5]
(Canada) G Dabrowski (United States) A Riske	3	4
(Russia) E Alexandrova (Russia) V Zvonareva	6	6
(Kazakhstan) E Rybakina (Germany) L Siegemund	2	6	[10]
(United States) H Carter (Brazil) L Stefani	6	3	[12]
(Australia) E Perez (Australia) S Sanders	6	1	[14]
7	(Germany) A-L Friedsam (Czech Republic) K Siniaková	2	6	[12]

Second round
1	(Belgium) E Mertens (Belarus) A Sabalenka	6	6
(Chile) A Guarachi (United States) D Krawczyk	1	2
(United States) J Brady (United States) C Dolehide	3	4
8	(Czech Republic) L Hradecká (Slovenia) A Klepač	6	6
3	(Czech Republic) K Peschke (Netherlands) D Schuurs	6	7^{7}
(Russia) E Alexandrova (Russia) V Zvonareva	2	6^{5}
(United States) H Carter (Brazil) L Stefani	3	6	[7]
(Australia) E Perez (Australia) S Sanders	6	4	[10]

Quarterfinals
1	(Belgium) E Mertens (Belarus) A Sabalenka
8	(Czech Republic) L Hradecká (Slovenia) A Klepač	w/o
3	(Czech Republic) K Peschke (Netherlands) D Schuurs	6	6
(Australia) E Perez (Australia) S Sanders	4	2

Semifinals
8	(Czech Republic) L Hradecká (Slovenia) A Klepač	2	1
3	(Czech Republic) K Peschke (Netherlands) D Schuurs	6	6

=== Bottom half ===
First round
5	(Japan) S Aoyama (Japan) E Shibahara	6	2	[10]
(Japan) N Hibino (Japan) M Ninomiya	4	6	[4]
Alt	(Czech Republic) M Bouzková (Switzerland) J Teichmann	1^{r}
WC	(United States) J Pegula (United States) S Rogers	4
(Slovakia) V Kužmová (Poland) I Świątek	6	6
(Ukraine) L Kichenok (Ukraine) N Kichenok	2	3
(United States) A Muhammad (United States) T Townsend	3	6	[10]
4	(United States) B Mattek-Sands (China) S Zhang	6	3	[8]
6	(Belarus) V Azarenka (United States) S Kenin	6	6
(Czech Republic) K Muchová (Latvia) A Sevastova	2	4
(Belgium) K Flipkens (Belgium) A Van Uytvanck	4	6	[4]
(Russia) A Blinkova (Russia) V Kudermetova	6	2	[10]
(Poland) M Linette (United Kingdom) H Watson	1	3
(United States) C Gauff (United States) C McNally	6	6
(United States) K Christian (Mexico) G Olmos	2	3
2	(United States) N Melichar (China) Y Xu	6	6

Second round
5	(Japan) S Aoyama (Japan) E Shibahara	3	4
WC	(United States) J Pegula (United States) S Rogers	6	6
(Slovakia) V Kužmová (Poland) I Świątek	7^{7}	6
(United States) A Muhammad (United States) T Townsend	6^{3}	3
6	(Belarus) V Azarenka (United States) S Kenin	1	6	[8]
(Russia) A Blinkova (Russia) V Kudermetova	6	4	[10]
(United States) C Gauff (United States) C McNally	6	3	[6]
2	(United States) N Melichar (China) Y Xu	3	6	[10]

Quarterfinals
WC	(United States) J Pegula (United States) S Rogers	1	6	[7]
(Slovakia) V Kužmová (Poland) I Świątek	6	1	[10]
(Russia) A Blinkova (Russia) V Kudermetova	7^{8}	3	[7]
2	(United States) N Melichar (China) Y Xu	6^{6}	6	[10]

Semifinals
(Slovakia) V Kužmová (Poland) I Świątek	4	5
2	(United States) N Melichar (China) Y Xu	6	7
