= 2020 Western & Southern Open – Men's doubles =

Men's doubles
- 2020 Western & Southern Open

Final
- Champions: (Spain) Pablo Carreño Busta (Australia) Alex de Minaur
- Runners-up: (United Kingdom) Jamie Murray (United Kingdom) Neal Skupski
- Score: 6–2, 7–5

Details
- Draw: 32 (3 WC )
- Seeds: 8

Events
Singles	men	women
Doubles	men	women
← 2019 ·	Western & Southern Open	· 2021 →

Ivan Dodig and Filip Polášek were the defending champions but lost in the first round to Pablo Carreño Busta and Alex de Minaur.

Carreño Busta and de Minaur went on to win the title, defeating Jamie Murray and Neal Skupski in the final, 6–2, 7–5.

== Seeds ==
1. (Colombia) Juan Sebastián Cabal / (Colombia) Robert Farah (first round)
2. (Poland) Łukasz Kubot / (Brazil) Marcelo Melo (second round)
3. (United States) Rajeev Ram / (United Kingdom) Joe Salisbury (semifinals)
4. (Croatia) Ivan Dodig / (Slovakia) Filip Polášek (first round)
5. (Spain) Marcel Granollers / (Argentina) Horacio Zeballos (quarterfinals)
6. (Germany) Kevin Krawietz / (Germany) Andreas Mies (quarterfinals)
7. (South Africa) Raven Klaasen / (Austria) Oliver Marach (second round)
8. (Netherlands) Wesley Koolhof / (Croatia) Nikola Mektić (quarterfinals)

== Draw ==
=== Key ===
- Q = Qualifier
- WC = Wild card
- LL = Lucky loser
- Alt = Alternate
- SE = Special exempt
- PR = Protected ranking
- ITF = ITF entry
- JE = Junior exempt
- w/o = Walkover
- r = Retired
- d = Defaulted
- SR = Special ranking

=== Finals ===
Semifinals
(United Kingdom) Jamie Murray (United Kingdom) Neal Skupski	7	6
3	(United States) Rajeev Ram (United Kingdom) Joe Salisbury	5	3
(Spain) Pablo Carreño Busta (Australia) Alex de Minaur	7	6
WC	(United States) Steve Johnson (United States) Austin Krajicek	5	4

Final
(United Kingdom) Jamie Murray (United Kingdom) Neal Skupski	2	5
(Spain) Pablo Carreño Busta (Australia) Alex de Minaur	6	7

=== Top half ===
First round
1	(Colombia) JS Cabal (Colombia) R Farah	6^{5}	6^{3}
(United Kingdom) J Murray (United Kingdom) N Skupski	7^{7}	7^{7}
WC	(United States) T Paul (United States) F Tiafoe	5	6	[7]
Alt	(Serbia) N Ćaćić (Serbia) D Lajović	7	3	[10]
WC	(United States) S Korda (United States) B Nakashima	2	4
(Austria) J Melzer (France) É Roger-Vasselin	6	6
(Croatia) B Ćorić (Croatia) F Škugor	2	3
6	(Germany) K Krawietz (Germany) A Mies	6	6
3	(United States) R Ram (United Kingdom) J Salisbury	6	6^{3}	[10]
(Chile) C Garín (Norway) C Ruud	3	7^{7}	[6]
(France) N Mahut (Germany) J-L Struff	3	6	[0]
(Canada) F Auger-Aliassime (Canada) M Raonic	6	1	[10]
(United States) T Fritz (United States) R Opelka	6	6^{3}	[10]
PR	(United States) S Querrey (United States) J Sock	3	7^{7}	[6]
(India) R Bopanna (Canada) D Shapovalov	4	6^{1}
5	(Spain) M Granollers (Argentina) H Zeballos	6	7^{7}

Second round
(United Kingdom) J Murray (United Kingdom) N Skupski	6	4	[10]
Alt	(Serbia) N Ćaćić (Serbia) D Lajović	3	6	[5]
(Austria) J Melzer (France) É Roger-Vasselin	6	4	[4]
6	(Germany) K Krawietz (Germany) A Mies	3	6	[10]
3	(United States) R Ram (United Kingdom) J Salisbury	w/o
(Canada) F Auger-Aliassime (Canada) M Raonic
(United States) T Fritz (United States) R Opelka	5	6^{1}
5	(Spain) M Granollers (Argentina) H Zeballos	7	7^{7}

Quarterfinals
(United Kingdom) J Murray (United Kingdom) N Skupski	4	6	[10]
6	(Germany) K Krawietz (Germany) A Mies	6	1	[8]
3	(United States) R Ram (United Kingdom) J Salisbury	7	7^{10}
5	(Spain) M Granollers (Argentina) H Zeballos	5	6^{8}

Semifinals
(United Kingdom) J Murray (United Kingdom) N Skupski	7	6
3	(United States) R Ram (United Kingdom) J Salisbury	5	3

=== Bottom half ===
First round
8	(Netherlands) W Koolhof (Croatia) N Mektić	6	6
(Russia) K Khachanov (Russia) A Rublev	4	2
(Australia) J Peers (New Zealand) M Venus	4	6^{3}
(United Kingdom) D Evans (Belgium) D Goffin	6	7^{7}
(Poland) H Hurkacz (United States) J Isner	6	6
(Australia) M Purcell (Australia) L Saville	3	0
(Spain) P Carreño Busta (Australia) A de Minaur	3	7^{7}	[10]
4	(Croatia) I Dodig (Slovakia) F Polášek	6	6^{3}	[5]
7	(South Africa) R Klaasen (Austria) O Marach	7^{8}	3	[10]
(Germany) T Pütz (Germany) A Zverev	6^{6}	6	[6]
(Netherlands) J-J Rojer (Romania) H Tecău	3	6	[10]
(France) J Chardy (France) F Martin	6	3	[8]
WC	(United States) S Johnson (United States) A Krajicek	6	6
Alt	(Belgium) S Gillé (Belgium) J Vliegen	0	2
(Croatia) M Pavić (Brazil) B Soares	6^{4}	6	[5]
2	(Poland) Ł Kubot (Brazil) M Melo	7^{7}	3	[10]

Second round
8	(Netherlands) W Koolhof (Croatia) N Mektić	7	6
(United Kingdom) D Evans (Belgium) D Goffin	5	1
(Poland) H Hurkacz (United States) J Isner	6^{6}	5
(Spain) P Carreño Busta (Australia) A de Minaur	7^{8}	7
7	(South Africa) R Klaasen (Austria) O Marach	3	4
(Netherlands) J-J Rojer (Romania) H Tecău	6	6
WC	(United States) S Johnson (United States) A Krajicek	6	7^{7}
2	(Poland) Ł Kubot (Brazil) M Melo	3	6^{4}

Quarterfinals
8	(Netherlands) W Koolhof (Croatia) N Mektić	5	7^{8}	[7]
(Spain) P Carreño Busta (Australia) A de Minaur	7	6^{6}	[10]
(Netherlands) J-J Rojer (Romania) H Tecău	4	5
WC	(United States) S Johnson (United States) A Krajicek	6	7

Semifinals
(Spain) P Carreño Busta (Australia) A de Minaur	7	6
WC	(United States) S Johnson (United States) A Krajicek	5	4
