= 2020 Western & Southern Open – Men's singles =

Men's singles
- 2020 Western & Southern Open

Final
- Champion: (Serbia) Novak Djokovic
- Runner-up: (Canada) Milos Raonic
- Score: 1–6, 6–3, 6–4

Details
- Draw: 56 (12 Q / 4 WC )
- Seeds: 16

Events
| Singles | men | women |
| Doubles | men | women |
- Western & Southern Open

Novak Djokovic defeated Milos Raonic in the final, 1–6, 6–3, 6–4 to win the men's singles tennis title at the 2020 Cincinnati Masters. With the win, he claimed his record-equaling 35th Masters 1000 title (tying Rafael Nadal's tally), and completed the double career Golden Masters. Djokovic became the first new singles titleist on the ATP Tour since its suspension due to the COVID-19 pandemic in March 2020.

Daniil Medvedev was the defending champion, but lost in the quarterfinals to Roberto Bautista Agut.

Due to the COVID-19 pandemic, this edition of the tournament was held at the USTA Billie Jean King National Tennis Center shortly before the 2020 US Open to minimize travel risks.

== Seeds ==
The top eight seeds receive a bye into the second round.

1. (Serbia) Novak Djokovic (champion)
2. (Austria) Dominic Thiem (second round)
3. (Russia) Daniil Medvedev (quarterfinals)
4. (Greece) Stefanos Tsitsipas (semifinals)
5. (Germany) Alexander Zverev (second round)
6. (Italy) Matteo Berrettini (third round)
7. (Belgium) David Goffin (third round)
8. (Spain) Roberto Bautista Agut (semifinals)

9. (Argentina) Diego Schwartzman (second round)
10. (Russia) Andrey Rublev (first round)
11. (Russia) Karen Khachanov (third round)
12. (Canada) Denis Shapovalov (second round)
13. (Chile) Cristian Garín (first round)
14. (Bulgaria) Grigor Dimitrov (second round)
15. (Canada) Félix Auger-Aliassime (second round)
16. (United States) John Isner (third round)

Click on the seed number of a player to go to their draw section.

== Draw ==
Key

- Q = Qualifier
- WC = Wild card
- LL = Lucky loser
- Alt = Alternate
- ITF = ITF entry
- PR = Protected ranking
- SR = Special ranking
- SE = Special exempt
- JE = Junior exempt
- JR = Junior Accelerator Programme entrant
- CO = College Accelerator Programme entrant
- NG = Next Gen Accelerator Program entrant
- w/o = Walkover
- r = Retired
- d = Defaulted

=== Finals ===
Quarterfinals
1 | (Serbia) Novak Djokovic | 6 | 6
(Germany) Jan-Lennard Struff | 3 | 1
3 | (Russia) Daniil Medvedev | 6 | 4 | 3
8 | (Spain) Roberto Bautista Agut | 1 | 6 | 6
(United States) Reilly Opelka | 6^{r}
4 | (Greece) Stefanos Tsitsipas | 5
(Canada) Milos Raonic | 4 | 7^{7} | 7
(Serbia) Filip Krajinović | 6 | 6^{2} | 5

Semifinals
1 | (Serbia) Novak Djokovic | 4 | 6 | 7^{7}
8 | (Spain) Roberto Bautista Agut | 6 | 4 | 6^{0}
4 | (Greece) Stefanos Tsitsipas | 6^{5} | 3
(Canada) Milos Raonic | 7^{7} | 6

Final
1 | (Serbia) Novak Djokovic | 1 | 6 | 6
(Canada) Milos Raonic | 6 | 3 | 4

=== Top half ===
==== Section 1 ====
First round
Q | (Lithuania) R Berankis | 6^{4} | 6 | 7
WC | (United States) T Paul | 7^{7} | 4 | 5
WC | (United States) T Sandgren | 6 | 7^{9}
(Italy) L Sonego | 3 | 6^{7}
(Georgia (country)) N Basilashvili | 4 | 1
15 | (Canada) F Auger-Aliassime | 6 | 6
12 | (Canada) D Shapovalov | 6 | 6
(Croatia) M Čilić | 3 | 3
(Germany) J-L Struff | 6 | 6
(Australia) A de Minaur | 2 | 4
(France) B Paire | 0 | 0^{r}
(Croatia) B Ćorić | 6 | 1

Second round
1 | (Serbia) N Djokovic | 7^{7} | 6
Q | (Lithuania) R Berankis | 6^{2} | 4
WC | (United States) T Sandgren | 6^{4} | 6 | 7^{7}
15 | (Canada) F Auger-Aliassime | 7^{7} | 2 | 6^{5}
12 | (Canada) D Shapovalov | 6^{4} | 6 | 4
(Germany) J-L Struff | 7^{7} | 3 | 6
(Croatia) B Ćorić | 6^{6} | 4
7 | (Belgium) D Goffin | 7^{8} | 6

Third round
1 | (Serbia) N Djokovic | 6 | 6
WC | (United States) T Sandgren | 2 | 4
(Germany) J-L Struff | 6 | 3 | 6
7 | (Belgium) D Goffin | 4 | 6 | 4

Quarterfinals
1 | (Serbia) N Djokovic | 6 | 6
(Germany) J-L Struff | 3 | 1

==== Section 2 ====
First round
Q | (United States) M McDonald | 6^{2} | 5
Q | (United States) M Giron | 7^{7} | 7
Q | (South Africa) L Harris | 1 | 3
(United States) T Fritz | 6 | 6
Q | (Slovenia) A Bedene | 6 | 6^{8} | 6
13 | (Chile) C Garín | 4 | 7^{10} | 0
11 | (Russia) K Khachanov | 6 | 6
(Kazakhstan) A Bublik | 4 | 4
(Spain) P Carreño Busta | 7 | 6
(Serbia) D Lajović | 5 | 1
Q | (United States) J. J. Wolf | 4 | 4
(France) R Gasquet | 6 | 6

Second round
3 | (Russia) D Medvedev | 6 | 6
Q | (United States) M Giron | 4 | 4
(United States) T Fritz | 6^{5} | 5
Q | (Slovenia) A Bedene | 7^{7} | 7
11 | (Russia) K Khachanov | 7^{10} | 6
(Spain) P Carreño Busta | 6^{8} | 1
(France) R Gasquet | 5 | 1
8 | (Spain) R Bautista Agut | 7 | 6

Third round
3 | (Russia) D Medvedev | 6 | 6
Q | (Slovenia) A Bedene | 3 | 3
11 | (Russia) K Khachanov | 6 | 3 | 2
8 | (Spain) R Bautista Agut | 4 | 6 | 6

Quarterfinals
3 | (Russia) D Medvedev | 6 | 4 | 3
8 | (Spain) R Bautista Agut | 1 | 6 | 6

=== Bottom half ===
==== Section 3 ====
First round
Q | (United States) S Korda | 6^{3} | 6 | 5
Q | (Finland) E Ruusuvuori | 7^{7} | 4 | 7
Q | (United Kingdom) C Norrie | 3 | 4
(United States) R Opelka | 6 | 6
(Norway) C Ruud | 6^{2} | 3
9 | (Argentina) D Schwartzman | 7^{7} | 6
16 | (United States) J Isner | 7 | 6
(Poland) H Hurkacz | 5 | 4
(France) A Mannarino | 6 | 4 | 6^{2}
(Australia) J Millman | 4 | 6 | 7^{7}
(United Kingdom) K Edmund | 6^{3} | 6 | 3
PR | (South Africa) K Anderson | 7^{7} | 4 | 6

Second round
6 | (Italy) M Berrettini | 6 | 6^{3} | 7
Q | (Finland) E Ruusuvuori | 4 | 7^{7} | 5
(United States) R Opelka | 6 | 7^{7}
9 | (Argentina) D Schwartzman | 3 | 6^{4}
16 | (United States) J Isner | 4 | 7^{7} | 7^{7}
(Australia) J Millman | 6 | 6^{3} | 6^{5}
PR | (South Africa) K Anderson | 1 | 3
4 | (Greece) S Tsitsipas | 6 | 6

Third round
6 | (Italy) M Berrettini | 3 | 6^{4}
(United States) R Opelka | 6 | 7^{7}
16 | (United States) J Isner | 6^{2} | 6^{4}
4 | (Greece) S Tsitsipas | 7^{7} | 7^{7}

Quarterfinals
(United States) R Opelka | 6^{r}
4 | (Greece) S Tsitsipas | 5

==== Section 4 ====
First round
WC | (United States) F Tiafoe | 6^{6} | 6 | 1
WC | (United Kingdom) A Murray | 7^{8} | 3 | 6
(United States) S Querrey | 4 | 4
(Canada) M Raonic | 6 | 6
(United Kingdom) D Evans | 7 | 3 | 6
10 | (Russia) A Rublev | 5 | 6 | 2
14 | (Bulgaria) G Dimitrov | 6 | 6
(France) U Humbert | 3 | 4
Q | (Hungary) M Fucsovics | 6 | 6
Q | (Slovakia) N Gombos | 3 | 4
(Serbia) F Krajinović | 7 | 6
Q | (Italy) S Caruso | 5 | 4

Second round
5 | (Germany) A Zverev | 3 | 6 | 5
WC | (United Kingdom) A Murray | 6 | 3 | 7
(Canada) M Raonic | 6 | 7
(United Kingdom) D Evans | 3 | 5
14 | (Bulgaria) G Dimitrov | 5 | 6 | 2
Q | (Hungary) M Fucsovics | 7 | 4 | 6
(Serbia) F Krajinović | 6 | 6
2 | (Austria) D Thiem | 2 | 1

Third round
WC | (United Kingdom) A Murray | 2 | 2
(Canada) M Raonic | 6 | 6
Q | (Hungary) M Fucsovics | 2 | 1
(Serbia) F Krajinović | 6 | 6

Quarterfinals
(Canada) M Raonic | 4 | 7^{7} | 7
(Serbia) F Krajinović | 6 | 6^{2} | 5

== Qualifying ==
=== Seeds ===
1. (France) Gilles Simon (qualifying competition)
2. (France) Jérémy Chardy (first round)
3. (Uruguay) Pablo Cuevas (first round)
4. (Slovenia) Aljaž Bedene (qualified)
5. (Argentina) Juan Ignacio Londero (first round)
6. (United States) Steve Johnson (first round)
7. (Australia) Jordan Thompson (qualifying competition)
8. (Portugal) João Sousa (first round)
9. (Moldova) Radu Albot (first round)
10. (Sweden) Mikael Ymer (first round)
11. (Belarus) Egor Gerasimov (first round)
12. (South Korea) Kwon Soon-woo (qualifying competition)
13. (Lithuania) Ričardas Berankis (qualified)
14. (Italy) Jannik Sinner (first round)
15. (Hungary) Attila Balázs (first round)
16. (United Kingdom) Cameron Norrie (qualified)
17. (Argentina) Federico Delbonis (first round)
18. (Italy) Gianluca Mager (first round)
19. (Serbia) Laslo Đere (first round)
20. (Brazil) Thiago Monteiro (qualifying competition, retired)
21. (Hungary) Márton Fucsovics (qualified)
22. (Austria) Dennis Novak (qualifying competition)
23. (Italy) Stefano Travaglia (first round)
24. (Japan) Yūichi Sugita (first round)

=== Qualifiers ===
1. (United States) Sebastian Korda
2. (Finland) Emil Ruusuvuori
3. (Lithuania) Ričardas Berankis
4. (Slovenia) Aljaž Bedene
5. (United States) Mackenzie McDonald
6. (Hungary) Márton Fucsovics
7. (Italy) Salvatore Caruso
8. (United Kingdom) Cameron Norrie
9. (United States) Marcos Giron
10. (South Africa) Lloyd Harris
11. (United States) J. J. Wolf
12. (Slovakia) Norbert Gombos

=== Qualifying draw ===
==== First qualifier ====
First round
1 | (France) Gilles Simon | 6 | 6
Alt | (Japan) Taro Daniel | 3 | 3
WC | (United States) Sebastian Korda | 6 | 4 | 6
15 | (Hungary) Attila Balázs | 4 | 6 | 3

Qualifying competition
1 | (France) Gilles Simon | 6 | 0 | 1
WC | (United States) Sebastian Korda | 3 | 6 | 6

==== Second qualifier ====
First round
2 | (France) Jérémy Chardy | 0 | 4
(Finland) Emil Ruusuvuori | 6 | 6
(Argentina) Federico Coria | 3 | 4
20 | (Brazil) Thiago Monteiro | 6 | 6

Qualifying competition
(Finland) Emil Ruusuvuori | 6 | 2
20 | (Brazil) Thiago Monteiro | 4 | 1^{r}

==== Third qualifier ====
First round
3 | (Uruguay) Pablo Cuevas | 4 | 6^{5}
(Japan) Yasutaka Uchiyama | 6 | 7^{7}
(Spain) Alejandro Davidovich Fokina | 3 | 4
13 | (Lithuania) Ričardas Berankis | 6 | 6

Qualifying competition
(Japan) Yasutaka Uchiyama | 2 | 7 | 6^{4}
13 | (Lithuania) Ričardas Berankis | 6 | 5 | 7^{7}

==== Fourth qualifier ====
First round
4 | (Slovenia) Aljaž Bedene | 6 | 7
WC | (United States) Denis Kudla | 4 | 5
Alt | (Bosnia and Herzegovina) Damir Džumhur | 7 | 1 | 4
22 | (Austria) Dennis Novak | 5 | 6 | 6

Qualifying competition
4 | (Slovenia) Aljaž Bedene | 4 | 6 | 6
22 | (Austria) Dennis Novak | 6 | 3 | 4

==== Fifth qualifier ====
First round
5 | (Argentina) Juan Ignacio Londero | 4 | 6^{0}
(Germany) Dominik Koepfer | 6 | 7^{7}
WC | (United States) Mackenzie McDonald | 7^{7} | 6
24 | (Japan) Yūichi Sugita | 6^{3} | 3

Qualifying competition
(Germany) Dominik Koepfer | 7^{7} | 5 | 6^{5}
WC | (United States) Mackenzie McDonald | 6^{0} | 7 | 7^{7}

==== Sixth qualifier ====
First round
6 | (United States) Steve Johnson | 3 | 7^{7} | 2
(Spain) Pedro Martínez | 6 | 6^{4} | 6
WC | (United States) Brandon Nakashima | 2 | 4
21 | (Hungary) Márton Fucsovics | 6 | 6

Qualifying competition
(Spain) Pedro Martínez | 1 | 2
21 | (Hungary) Márton Fucsovics | 6 | 6

==== Seventh qualifier ====
First round
7 | (Australia) Jordan Thompson | 6 | 7^{7}
WC | (United States) Michael Mmoh | 2 | 6^{2}
(Italy) Salvatore Caruso | 5 | 6 | 6
14 | (Italy) Jannik Sinner | 7 | 4 | 2

Qualifying competition
7 | (Australia) Jordan Thompson | 4 | 4
(Italy) Salvatore Caruso | 6 | 6

==== Eighth qualifier ====
First round
8 | (Portugal) João Sousa | 3 | 3
PR | (Poland) Kamil Majchrzak | 6 | 6
(Kazakhstan) Mikhail Kukushkin | 6^{3} | 2
16 | (United Kingdom) Cameron Norrie | 7^{7} | 6

Qualifying competition
PR | (Poland) Kamil Majchrzak | 7 | 2 | 4
16 | (United Kingdom) Cameron Norrie | 5 | 6 | 6

==== Ninth qualifier ====
First round
9 | (Moldova) Radu Albot | 3 | 2
(France) Grégoire Barrère | 6 | 6
(United States) Marcos Giron | 6 | 6
19 | (Serbia) Laslo Đere | 2 | 2

Qualifying competition
(France) Grégoire Barrère | 6 | 6^{2} | 4
(United States) Marcos Giron | 4 | 7^{7} | 6

==== Tenth qualifier ====
First round
10 | (Sweden) Mikael Ymer | 5 | 5
(South Africa) Lloyd Harris | 7 | 7
(Slovakia) Andrej Martin | 6 | 7
18 | (Italy) Gianluca Mager | 2 | 5

Qualifying competition
(South Africa) Lloyd Harris | 6 | 4 | 6
(Slovakia) Andrej Martin | 2 | 6 | 1

==== Eleventh qualifier ====
First round
11 | (Belarus) Egor Gerasimov | 3 | 1
WC | (United States) J. J. Wolf | 6 | 6
(Spain) Jaume Munar | 6 | 7^{7}
17 | (Argentina) Federico Delbonis | 1 | 6^{3}

Qualifying competition
WC | (United States) J. J. Wolf | 2 | 6 | 6
(Spain) Jaume Munar | 6 | 2 | 4

==== Twelfth qualifier ====
First round
12 | (South Korea) Kwon Soon-woo | 4 | 6 | 6
(Italy) Andreas Seppi | 6 | 3 | 4
Alt | (Slovakia) Norbert Gombos | 7^{8} | 4 | 6
23 | (Italy) Stefano Travaglia | 6^{6} | 6 | 4

Qualifying competition
12 | (South Korea) Kwon Soon-woo | 6^{4} | 7^{7} | 4
Alt | (Slovakia) Norbert Gombos | 7^{7} | 6^{1} | 6
