= 2020 Western & Southern Open =

- Date: August 22–29
- Edition: 119th (men) / 92nd (women)
- Category: ATP Tour Masters 1000 (men); WTA Premier 5 (women)
- Surface: Hard
- Location: New York City, United States
- Venue: USTA Billie Jean King National Tennis Center

Champions

Men's singles
- (Serbia) Novak Djokovic

Women's singles
- (Belarus) Victoria Azarenka

Men's doubles
- (Spain) Pablo Carreño Busta / (Australia) Alex de Minaur

Women's doubles
- (Czech Republic) Květa Peschke / (Netherlands) Demi Schuurs
- Cincinnati Open

The 2020 Western & Southern Open was a men's and women's tennis tournament being played on outdoor hard courts from August 22–29, 2020. It was the first Masters 1000 tournament on the 2020 ATP Tour and the second WTA Premier 5 tournament on the 2020 WTA Tour. This was the first ATP tournament since the Tour was suspended due to the COVID-19 pandemic.

The 2020 tournament was the 119th men's edition and the 92nd women's edition of the Cincinnati Open. This event normally took place in Cincinnati, Ohio, but was held at the USTA Billie Jean King National Tennis Center in New York City, United States, in order to reduce unnecessary player travel by centralizing the tournament and the subsequent US Open in the same venue.

== Prize money ==
Event	W	F	SF	QF	Round of 16	Round of 32	Round of 64	Q2	Q1
Men's singles	$285,000	$185,015	$124,000	$98,500	$73,250	$43,450	$24,560	$12,595	$6,655
Women's singles	$285,000	$152,999	$75,000	$43,000	$22,000	$14,200	$11,000	$3,575	$2,265
Men's doubles	$80,000	$68,000	$55,040	$41,000	$24,320	$12,910	—N/a	—N/a	—N/a
Women's doubles	$85,000	$45,000	$25,000	$15,000	$9,860	$4,500	—N/a	—N/a	—N/a

== ATP singles main-draw entrants ==
=== Seeds ===
Country	Player	Rank^{1}	Seed
SRB	Novak Djokovic	1	1
AUT	Dominic Thiem	3	2
RUS	Daniil Medvedev	5	3
GRE	Stefanos Tsitsipas	6	4
GER	Alexander Zverev	7	5
ITA	Matteo Berrettini	8	6
BEL	David Goffin	10	7
ESP	Roberto Bautista Agut	12	8
ARG	Diego Schwartzman	13	9
RUS	Andrey Rublev	14	10
RUS	Karen Khachanov	15	11
CAN	Denis Shapovalov	16	12
CHI	Cristian Garín	18	13
BUL	Grigor Dimitrov	19	14
CAN	Félix Auger-Aliassime	20	15
USA	John Isner	21	16

^{1} Rankings are as of March 16, 2020.

=== Other entrants ===
The following players received wild cards into the main singles draw:

- (United Kingdom) Andy Murray
- (United States) Tommy Paul
- (United States) Tennys Sandgren
- (United States) Frances Tiafoe

The following player used a protected ranking into the main singles draw:

- (South Africa) Kevin Anderson

The following players received entry from the singles qualifying draw:

- (Slovenia) Aljaž Bedene
- (Lithuania) Ričardas Berankis
- (Italy) Salvatore Caruso
- (Hungary) Márton Fucsovics
- (United States) Marcos Giron
- (Slovakia) Norbert Gombos
- (South Africa) Lloyd Harris
- (United States) Sebastian Korda
- (United States) Mackenzie McDonald
- (United Kingdom) Cameron Norrie
- (Finland) Emil Ruusuvuori
- (United States) J. J. Wolf

=== Withdrawals ===
Before the tournament

- (Australia) Nick Kyrgios → replaced by (United Kingdom) Kyle Edmund
- (Spain) Rafael Nadal → replaced by (United States) Sam Querrey
- (Japan) Kei Nishikori → replaced by (Italy) Lorenzo Sonego
- (Argentina) Guido Pella → replaced by (Kazakhstan) Alexander Bublik
- (Spain) Albert Ramos Viñolas → replaced by (France) Richard Gasquet

== ATP doubles main-draw entrants ==
=== Seeds ===
Country	Player	Country	Player	Rank^{1}	Seed
COL	Juan Sebastián Cabal	COL	Robert Farah	3	1
POL	Łukasz Kubot	BRA	Marcelo Melo	10	2
USA	Rajeev Ram	GBR	Joe Salisbury	16	3
CRO	Ivan Dodig	SVK	Filip Polášek	18	4
ESP	Marcel Granollers	ARG	Horacio Zeballos	20	5
GER	Kevin Krawietz	GER	Andreas Mies	27	6
RSA	Raven Klaasen	AUT	Oliver Marach	35	7
NED	Wesley Koolhof	CRO	Nikola Mektić	39	8

^{1} Rankings are as of August 10, 2020

=== Other entrants ===
The following pairs received wildcards into the doubles main draw:

- (United States) Steve Johnson / (United States) Austin Krajicek
- (United States) Sebastian Korda / (United States) Brandon Nakashima
- (United States) Tommy Paul / (United States) Frances Tiafoe

== WTA singles main-draw entrants ==
=== Seeds ===
Country	Player	Rank^{1}	Seed
CZE	Karolína Plíšková	3	1
USA	Sofia Kenin	4	2
USA	Serena Williams	9	3
JPN	Naomi Osaka	10	4
BLR	Aryna Sabalenka	11	5
CZE	Petra Kvitová	12	6
USA	Madison Keys	13	7
GBR	Johanna Konta	14	8
KAZ	Elena Rybakina	17	9
CZE	Markéta Vondroušová	18	10
USA	Alison Riske	19	11
EST	Anett Kontaveit	20	12
GRE	Maria Sakkari	21	13
BEL	Elise Mertens	22	14
CRO	Donna Vekić	24	15
UKR	Dayana Yastremska	25	16

^{1} Rankings are as of August 17, 2020.

=== Other entrants ===
The following players received wild cards into the main singles draw:

- ~~(Belgium) Kim Clijsters~~
- (United States) Caty McNally
- (Japan) Naomi Osaka
- (United States) Sloane Stephens
- (United States) Venus Williams

The following players received entry from the singles qualifying draw:

- (United States) Catherine Bellis
- (France) Océane Dodin
- (Canada) Leylah Annie Fernandez
- (Belgium) Kirsten Flipkens
- (Russia) Anna Kalinskaya
- (United States) Ann Li
- (United States) Christina McHale
- (United States) Jessica Pegula
- (Netherlands) Arantxa Rus
- (Germany) Laura Siegemund
- (Switzerland) Jil Teichmann
- (Russia) Vera Zvonareva

The following player received entry as a lucky loser:

- (Russia) Daria Kasatkina

=== Withdrawals ===
Before the tournament

- (Switzerland) Belinda Bencic → replaced by (France) Alizé Cornet
- (Netherlands) Kiki Bertens → replaced by (Belgium) Alison Van Uytvanck
- (Belgium) Kim Clijsters → replaced by (Russia) Daria Kasatkina
- (France) Fiona Ferro → replaced by (Belarus) Victoria Azarenka
- (Russia) Svetlana Kuznetsova → replaced by (Australia) Ajla Tomljanović
- (Spain) Garbiñe Muguruza → replaced by (United States) Bernarda Pera
- (Czech Republic) Barbora Strýcová → replaced by (Czech Republic) Kateřina Siniaková

== WTA doubles main-draw entrants ==
=== Seeds ===
Country	Player	Country	Player	Rank^{1}	Seed
BEL	Elise Mertens	BLR	Aryna Sabalenka	11	1
USA	Nicole Melichar	CHN	Xu Yifan	29	2
CZE	Květa Peschke	NED	Demi Schuurs	35	3
USA	Bethanie Mattek-Sands	CHN	Zhang Shuai	41	4
JPN	Shuko Aoyama	JPN	Ena Shibahara	47	5
BLR	Victoria Azarenka	USA	Sofia Kenin	51	6
GER	Anna-Lena Friedsam	CZE	Kateřina Siniaková	55	7
CZE	Lucie Hradecká	SLO	Andreja Klepač	60	8

^{1} Rankings are as of August 17, 2020

=== Other entrants ===
The following pairs received wildcards into the doubles main draw:

- (United States) Ann Li / (United States) Bernarda Pera
- (United States) Jessica Pegula / (United States) Shelby Rogers

== Champions ==
=== Men's singles ===
- (Serbia) Novak Djokovic def. (Canada) Milos Raonic, 1–6, 6–3, 6–4

=== Women's singles ===
- (Belarus) Victoria Azarenka def. (Japan) Naomi Osaka via walkover.

=== Men's doubles ===
- (Spain) Pablo Carreño Busta / (Australia) Alex de Minaur def. (United Kingdom) Jamie Murray / (United Kingdom) Neal Skupski, 6–2, 7–5

=== Women's doubles ===
- (Czech Republic) Květa Peschke / (Netherlands) Demi Schuurs def. (United States) Nicole Melichar / (China) Xu Yifan, 6–1, 4–6, [10–4]
