= 2022 Tallinn Open =

Women's tennis tournament held in Tallinn, Estonia

- Date: 26 September – 2 October
- Edition: 1st
- Category: WTA 250
- Draw: 32S / 16D
- Prize money: €251,750
- Surface: Hard / indoor
- Location: Tallinn, Estonia
- Venue: FORUS Tennis Center

Champions

Singles
- (Czech Republic) Barbora Krejčíková

Doubles
- (Ukraine) Lyudmyla Kichenok / (Ukraine) Nadiia Kichenok
- Tallinn Open

The 2022 Tallinn Open event was a professional women's tennis tournament played on indoor hard courts at the Forus Tennis Centre and held between 26 September and 2 October 2022. It was the first tournament in the Women's Tennis Association (WTA)'s history to be held in Tallinn, Estonia and was organized as a WTA 250 event on the 2022 WTA Tour.

The event was held for the first time, however, it was one of the six tournaments that were given single-year WTA 250 licenses in September and October 2022 due to the cancellation of tournaments in China during the 2022 season because of the ongoing COVID-19 pandemic, as well as the suspension of tournaments in China following former WTA player Peng Shuai's allegation of sexual assault against a Chinese government official.

== Champions ==
=== Singles ===
- (Czech Republic) Barbora Krejčíková def. (Estonia) Anett Kontaveit 6–2, 6–3

This is Krejčíková's first title of the year and fourth of her career.

=== Doubles ===
- (Ukraine) Lyudmyla Kichenok / (Ukraine) Nadiia Kichenok def. (United States) Nicole Melichar-Martinez / (Germany) Laura Siegemund 7–5, 4–6, [10–7]

== Points and prize money ==
=== Point distribution ===
Event	W	F	SF	QF	Round of 16	Round of 32	Q	Q2	Q1
Women's singles	280	180	110	60	30	1	18	12	1
Women's doubles	280	180	110	60	1	—N/a	—N/a	—N/a	—N/a

=== Prize money ===
Event	W	F	SF	QF	Round of 16	Round of 32^{1}	Q2	Q1
Women's singles	$31,000	$18,037	$10,100	$5,800	$3,675	$2,675	$1,950	$1,270
Women's doubles*	$10,800	$6,300	$3,800	$2,300	$1,750	—N/a	—N/a	—N/a

_{^{1}Qualifiers prize money is also the Round of 32 prize money.}
_{*per team}

== Singles main-draw entrants ==
=== Seeds ===
Country	Player	Rank^{†}	Seed
EST	Anett Kontaveit	3	1
SUI	Belinda Bencic	14	2
BRA	Beatriz Haddad Maia	16	3
USA	Madison Keys	17	4
LAT	Jeļena Ostapenko	19	5
~~KAZ~~	~~Elena Rybakina~~	~~22~~	~~6~~
CZE	Barbora Krejčíková	25	7
CHN	Zhang Shuai	28	8
SUI	Jil Teichmann	31	9

^{†} Rankings are as of 19 September 2022.

=== Other entrants ===
The following players received wildcards into the main draw:

- (Estonia) Elena Malõgina
- (Czech Republic) Karolína Muchová
- (Estonia) Maileen Nuudi

The following player received entry into the singles main draw with a special ranking:

- (Germany) Laura Siegemund

The following players received entry from the qualifying draw:

- (Belgium) Ysaline Bonaventure
- (United Kingdom) Katie Boulter
- (Switzerland) Viktorija Golubic
- (Slovakia) Viktória Kužmová
- (Czech Republic) Linda Nosková
- (France) Jessika Ponchet

The following player received entry as a lucky loser:

- (Sweden) Mirjam Björklund

=== Withdrawals ===
- (Ukraine) Anhelina Kalinina → replaced by (China) Wang Xiyu
- (Kazakhstan) Elena Rybakina → replaced by (Sweden) Mirjam Björklund
- (Denmark) Clara Tauson → replaced by (China) Wang Xinyu
- (Belgium) Alison Van Uytvanck → replaced by (Romania) Jaqueline Cristian

== Doubles main-draw entrants ==
=== Seeds ===
Country	Player	Country	Player	Rank^{1}	Seed
USA	Nicole Melichar-Martinez	GER	Laura Siegemund	51	1
NOR	Ulrikke Eikeri	SVK	Tereza Mihalíková	100	2
UKR	Lyudmyla Kichenok	UKR	Nadiia Kichenok	114	3
JPN	Miyu Kato	CHN	Wang Xinyu	143	4

- ^{1} Rankings as of 19 September 2022.

=== Other entrants ===
The following pairs received wildcards into the doubles main draw:

- (Greece) Valentini Grammatikopoulou / (Latvia) Daniela Vismane
- (Estonia) Elena Malõgina / (Estonia) Maileen Nuudi

=== Withdrawals ===
Before the tournament

- (Germany) Vivian Heisen / (Romania) Monica Niculescu → replaced by (Romania) Jaqueline Cristian / (Germany) Vivian Heisen
