= Nadiia Kichenok =

Ukrainian tennis player (born 1992)

Nadiia Kichenok Надія Кіченок
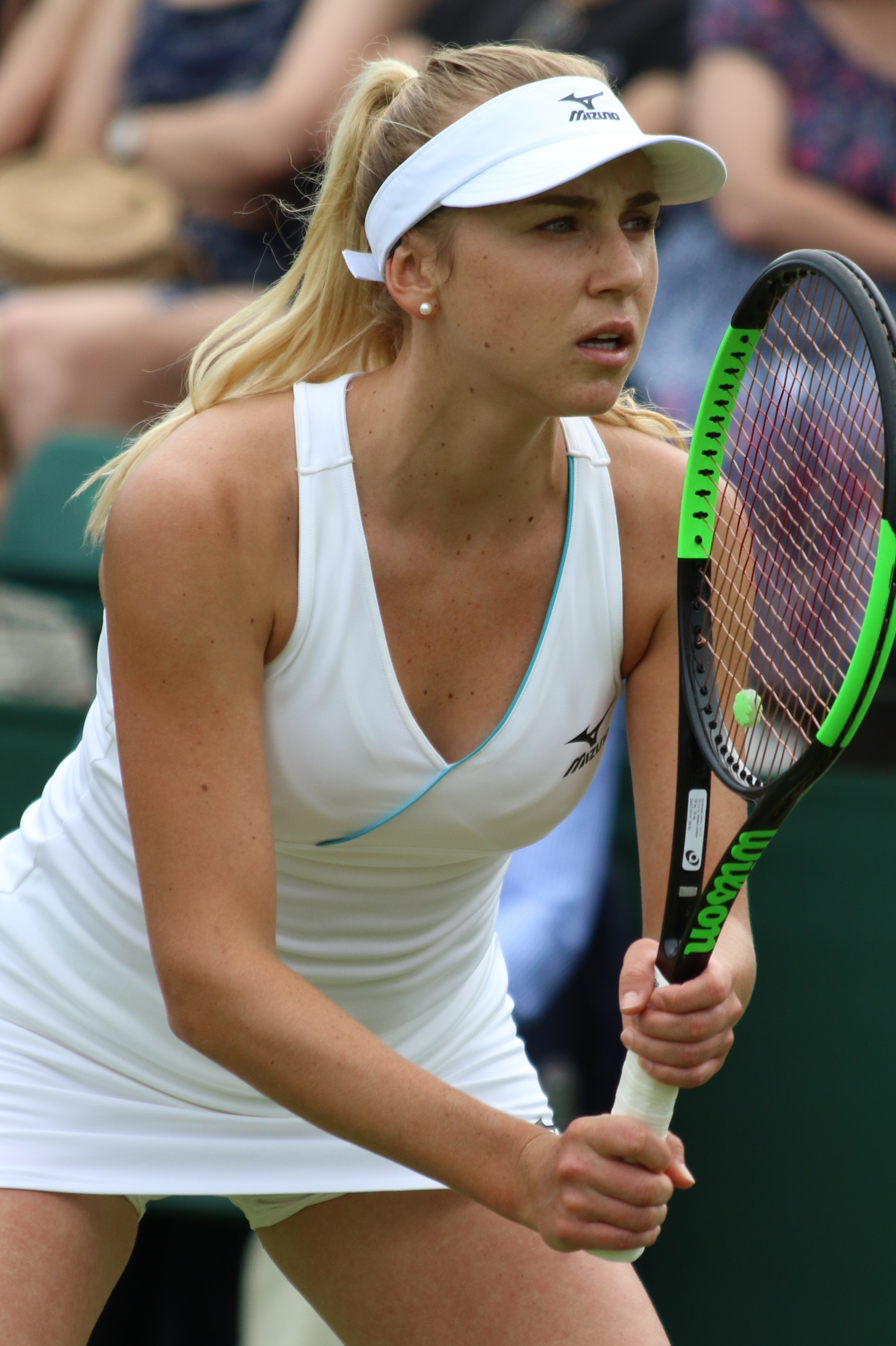
- Kichenok at the 2019 Wimbledon Championships
- Country (sports): Ukraine
- Residence: Dnipro, Ukraine
- Born: 20 July 1992 (age 34) Dnipropetrovsk, Ukraine
- Height: 1.72 m (5 ft 8 in)
- Turned pro: 2006
- Plays: Right (two-handed backhand)
- Prize money: $2,076,863

Singles
- Career record: 228–176
- Career titles: 0 WTA, 4 ITF
- Highest ranking: No. 100 (6 January 2014)
- Current ranking: No. 1,117 (19 October 2026)

Grand Slam singles results
- Australian Open: 1R (2014)
- French Open: 1R (2014)
- Wimbledon: Q1 (2013, 2014)
- US Open: Q1 (2013, 2014)

Doubles
- Career record: 450–357
- Career titles: 11
- Highest ranking: No. 29 (31 January 2022)
- Current ranking: No. 85 (19 October 2026)

Grand Slam doubles results
- Australian Open: 3R (2018, 2025)
- French Open: QF (2024)
- Wimbledon: QF (2024)
- US Open: 3R (2021)

Other doubles tournaments
- Olympic Games: QF (2021, 2024)

Grand Slam mixed doubles results
- Australian Open: QF (2020)
- French Open: SF (2019)
- Wimbledon: 3R (2019)
- US Open: QF (2018)

Team competitions
- Fed Cup: SF (2025)
- Last updated on: 23 October 2026.

Nadiia Viktorivna Kichenok (Ukrainian: Надія Вікторівна Кіченок, born 20 July 1992) is a Ukrainian professional tennis player. On 31 January 2022, she reached a career-high of No. 29 in the WTA doubles rankings. Kichenok has won eleven doubles titles on the WTA Tour, including four with her twin sister Lyudmyla. She has also won four singles titles and 24 doubles titles on the ITF Women's Circuit. On 6 January 2014, she also reached a career-high singles ranking of No. 100.

== Career ==
Playing for Ukraine Fed Cup team, Kichenok has a win–loss record of 10–7, as of October 2026.

In 2015, Nadiia and Lyudmyla came back from a 0–5 deficit in the second set tie-break of their 6–4, 7–6 defeat of Liang Chen and Wang Yafan in the Shenzhen Open final. That made the Kichenoks the second pair of twins, after Karolína and Kristýna Plíšková, to win a WTA Tour doubles title. They had previously been runners-up at Tashkent in 2011, and at Shenzhen in 2014.

Partnering with Raluca Olaru, she defeated Kaitlyn Christian and Sabrina Santamaria in the final to claim the doubles title at the 2021 St. Petersburg Ladies' Trophy. They also won the 2021 Chicago Women's Open, winning the final against her sister Lyudmyla and Makoto Ninomiya in a deciding champions tiebreak.

At the inaugural edition of the Tallinn Open in 2022, seeded third with her sister, she won her eighth title defeating top seeds Nicole Melichar and Laura Siegemund in the final.

At the 2023 Ladies Linz, she reached the final with Anna-Lena Friedsam, losing to Natela Dzalamidze and her partner Viktória Kužmová in a champions tiebreak.

With her sister, she reached the quarterfinals at the 2024 Paris Olympics.

In Ukraine's 2024 Billie Jean King Cup play-offs tie against Austria, Kichenok partnered with Katarina Zavatska to defeat Sinja Kraus and Tamira Paszek in the deciding doubles match.

Partnering with her sister Lyudmyla, she was runner-up in the doubles at the 2025 Linz Open, losing to Tímea Babos and Luisa Stefani in the final which went to a deciding champions tiebreak.

== Apparel and equipment ==
Nadiia Kichenok is sponsored by Mizuno and Wilson (racket).

== Performance timelines ==
Key
W	F	SF	QF	#R	RR	Q#	DNQ	A	NH

(W) winner; (F) finalist; (SF) semifinalist; (QF) quarterfinalist; (#R) rounds 4, 3, 2, 1; (RR) round-robin stage; (Q#) qualification round; (DNQ) did not qualify; (A) absent; (NH) not held; (SR) strike rate (events won / competed); (W–L) win–loss record.
To avoid confusion and double counting, these charts are updated at the conclusion of a tournament or when the player's participation has ended.

=== Doubles ===
Tournament	2014	2015	2016	2017	2018	2019	2020	2021	2022	2023	2024	2025	2026	SR	W–L
Australian Open	A	A	2R	1R	3R	2R	1R	2R	1R	2R	1R	3R	2R	0 / 11	9–11
French Open	A	1R	2R	1R	2R	3R	1R	2R	1R	1R	QF	1R	3R	0 / 12	10–12
Wimbledon	2R	1R	1R	2R	2R	3R	NH	3R	3R	1R	QF	1R	1R	0 / 12	12–12
US Open	A	2R	2R	2R	1R	2R	1R	3R	1R	2R	1R	1R	2R	0 / 12	8–12
Win–Loss	1–1	1–3	3–4	2–4	4–4	6–4	0–3	6–4	2–4	2–4	6–4	2–4	4–4	0 / 47	39–47

== Significant finals ==
=== WTA Elite Trophy ===
==== Singles: 1 (title) ====
Result	Year	Location	Surface	Partner	Opponents	Score
Win	2018	Zhuhai, China	Hard (i)	(Ukraine) Lyudmyla Kichenok	(Japan) Shuko Aoyama (Belarus) Lidziya Marozava	6–4, 3–6, [10–7]

== WTA Tour finals ==
=== Doubles: 22 (11 titles, 11 runner-ups) ===
Legend Elite Trophy (1–0) WTA 500 (1–4) WTA 250 (9–7)	Finals by surface Hard (9–7) Clay (2–3) Grass (0–1)

Result	W–L	Date	Tournament	Tier	Surface	Partner	Opponents	Score
Loss	0–1	Sep 2011	Tashkent Open, Uzbekistan	International (Note: The WTA International tournaments were reclassified as WTA 250 tournaments in 2021.)	Hard	(Ukraine) Lyudmyla Kichenok	(Greece) Eleni Daniilidou (Russia) Vitalia Diatchenko	4–6, 3–6
Loss	0–2	Jan 2014	Shenzhen Open, China	International	Hard	(Ukraine) Lyudmyla Kichenok	(Romania) Monica Niculescu (Czech Republic) Klára Zakopalová	3–6, 4–6
Win	1–2	Jan 2015	Shenzhen Open, China	International	Hard	(Ukraine) Lyudmyla Kichenok	(China) Liang Chen (China) Wang Yafan	6–4, 7–6^{(8–6)}
Loss	1–3	May 2015	Internationaux de Strasbourg, France	International	Clay	(China) Zheng Saisai	(Chinese Taipei) Chuang Chia-jung (China) Liang Chen	6–4, 4–6, [10–12]
Win	2–3	Aug 2016	Brasil Tennis Cup, Brazil	International	Hard	(Ukraine) Lyudmyla Kichenok	(Hungary) Tímea Babos (Hungary) Réka Luca Jani	6–3, 6–1
Loss	2–4	Apr 2017	Monterrey Open, Mexico	International	Hard	(Slovenia) Dalila Jakupovic	(Japan) Nao Hibino (Poland) Alicja Rosolska	2–6, 6–7 ^{(4–7)}
Win	3–4	Apr 2017	İstanbul Cup, Turkey	International	Clay	(Slovenia) Dalila Jakupovic	(United States) Nicole Melichar (Belgium) Elise Mertens	7–6^{(8–6)}, 6–2
Loss	3–5	May 2018	Internationaux de Strasbourg, France	International	Clay	(Australia) Anastasia Rodionova	(Romania) Mihaela Buzărnescu (Romania) Raluca Olaru	5–7, 5–7
Loss	3–6	Aug 2018	Silicon Valley Classic, US	Premier (Note: The WTA Premier tournaments were reclassified as WTA 500 tournaments in 2021.)	Hard	(Ukraine) Lyudmyla Kichenok	(Chinese Taipei) Latisha Chan (Czech Republic) Květa Peschke	4–6, 1–6
Win	4–6	Nov 2018	WTA Elite Trophy, China	Elite Trophy	Hard	(Ukraine) Lyudmyla Kichenok	(Japan) Shuko Aoyama (Belarus) Lidziya Marozava	6–4, 3–6, [10–7]
Win	5–6	Jan 2020	Hobart International, Australia	International	Hard	(India) Sania Mirza	(China) Peng Shuai (China) Zhang Shuai	6–4, 6–4
Win	6–6	Mar 2021	St. Petersburg Trophy, Russia	WTA 500	Hard (i)	(Romania) Raluca Olaru	(United States) Kaitlyn Christian (United States) Sabrina Santamaria	2–6, 6–3, [10–8]
Loss	6–7	Jun 2021	Bad Homburg Open, Germany	WTA 250	Grass	(Romania) Raluca Olaru	(Croatia) Darija Jurak (Slovenia) Andreja Klepač	3–6, 1–6
Win	7–7	Aug 2021	Chicago Women's Open, US	WTA 250	Hard	(Romania) Raluca Olaru	(Ukraine) Lyudmyla Kichenok (Japan) Makoto Ninomiya	7–6^{(8–6)}, 5–7, [10–8]
Loss	7–8	Oct 2021	Kremlin Cup, Russia	WTA 500	Hard (i)	(Romania) Raluca Olaru	(Latvia) Jeļena Ostapenko (Czech Republic) Kateřina Siniaková	2–6, 6–4, [8–10]
Win	8–8	Oct 2022	Tallinn Open, Estonia	WTA 250	Hard (i)	(Ukraine) Lyudmyla Kichenok	(United States) Nicole Melichar-Martinez (Germany) Laura Siegemund	7–5, 4–6, [10–7]
Loss	8–9	Feb 2023	Linz Open, Austria	WTA 250	Hard (i)	(Germany) Anna-Lena Friedsam	(Georgia (country)) Natela Dzalamidze (Slovakia) Viktória Kužmová	6–4, 5–7, [10–12]
Win	9–9	Sep 2023	Japan Women's Open	WTA 250	Hard	(Germany) Anna-Lena Friedsam	Anna Kalinskaya (Kazakhstan) Yulia Putintseva	7–6^{(7–3)}, 6–3
Loss	9–10	Apr 2024	Charleston Open, US	WTA 500	Clay	(Ukraine) Lyudmyla Kichenok	(United States) Ashlyn Krueger (United States) Sloane Stephens	6–1, 3–6, [7–10]
Loss	9–11	Jan 2025	Linz Open, Austria	WTA 500	Hard	(Ukraine) Lyudmyla Kichenok	(Hungary) Tímea Babos (Brazil) Luisa Stefani	6–3, 5–7, [4–10]
Win	10–11	Jul 2025	Hamburg Open, Germany	WTA 250	Clay	(Japan) Makoto Ninomiya	(Hungary) Anna Bondár (Netherlands) Arantxa Rus	6–4, 3–6, [11–9]
Win	11–11	Jul 2025	Prague Open, Czech Republic	WTA 250	Hard	(Japan) Makoto Ninomiya	(Czech Republic) Laura Samson (Czech Republic) Lucie Havlíčková	1–6, 6–4, [10–7]

== WTA 125 finals ==
=== Doubles: 2 (2 runner-ups) ===
Result	W–L	Date	Tournament	Surface	Partner	Opponents	Score
Loss	0–1	Nov 2022	Midland Tennis Classic, United States	Hard (i)	(Germany) Anna-Lena Friedsam	(United States) Asia Muhammad (United States) Alycia Parks	2–6, 3–6
Loss	0–2	May 2023	Trophée Clarins, France	Clay	(United States) Alycia Parks	(Kazakhstan) Anna Danilina; Vera Zvonareva	7–5, 6–7^{(2)}, [12–14]

== ITF Circuit finals ==
=== Singles: 11 (4 titles, 7 runner-ups) ===
Legend $100,000 tournaments (1–0) $50,000 tournaments (0–1) $25,000 tournaments (3–4) $10,000 tournaments (0–2)	Finals by surface Hard (4–6) Carpet (0–1)

Result	W–L	Date	Tournament	Tier	Surface	Opponent	Score
Loss	0–1	Oct 2009	ITF Kharkiv, Ukraine	10,000	Carpet (i)	(Ukraine) Lyudmyla Kichenok	7–6^{(2)}, 2–6, 3–6
Loss	0–2	Apr 2011	ITF Minsk, Belarus	25,000	Hard (i)	(Russia) Olga Puchkova	2–6, 5–7
Loss	0–3	May 2012	Fergana Challenger, Uzbekistan	25,000	Hard	(Croatia) Donna Vekić	2–6, 2–6
Loss	0–4	Jun 2012	ITF Qarshi, Uzbekistan	10,000	Hard	(Belarus) Ksenia Milevskaya	4–6, 5–7
Win	1–4	Jun 2012	ITF Qarshi, Uzbekistan	25,000	Hard	(Slovenia) Tadeja Majerič	6–3, 7–6^{(3)}
Loss	1–5	Sep 2012	ITF Yoshkar-Ola, Russia	25,000	Hard (i)	(Russia) Margarita Gasparyan	5–7, 6–7^{(3)}
Loss	1–6	Jan 2013	Blossom Cup, China	50,000	Hard	(Thailand) Varatchaya Wongteanchai	2–6, 7–6^{(5)}, 6–7^{(5)}
Loss	1–7	Mar 2013	ITF Tallinn, Estonia	25,000	Hard (i)	(Belarus) Aliaksandra Sasnovich	6–7^{(3)}, 2–6
Win	2–7	Apr 2013	ITF Namangan, Uzbekistan	25,000	Hard	(Georgia (country)) Oksana Kalashnikova	6–2, 6–3
Win	3–7	Jul 2013	President's Cup, Kazakhstan	100,000	Hard	(Portugal) Maria João Koehler	6–4, 7–5
Win	4–7	Nov 2013	ITF Astana, Kazakhstan	25,000	Hard (i)	(Belarus) Ilona Kremen	6–3, 6–1

=== Doubles: 46 (24 titles, 22 runner-ups) ===
Legend $100,000 tournaments (1–1) $75/80,000 tournaments (0–2) $50/60,000 tournaments (9–4) $25,000 tournaments (12–12) $10,000 tournaments (2–3)	Finals by surface Hard (18–11) Clay (2–9) Carpet (4–2)

Result	No.	Date	Tournament	Surface	Partnering	Opponents	Score
Loss	1.	1 October 2006	Royal Cup Podgorica, Montenegro	Clay	(Ukraine) Lyudmyla Kichenok	(Croatia) Josipa Bek (Serbia and Montenegro) Karolina Jovanović	4–6, 7–5, 2–6
Loss	2.	25 May 2007	ITF Cherkassy, Ukraine	Clay	(Ukraine) Lyudmyla Kichenok	(Ukraine) Katerina Avdiyenko (Ukraine) Anna Zaporozhanova	6–7^{(3)}, 2–6
Loss	3.	3 August 2008	ITF Dnipropetrovsk, Ukraine	Clay	(Ukraine) Lyudmyla Kichenok	(Russia) Vasilisa Davydova (Russia) Maria Kondratieva	3–6, 1–6
Loss	4.	29 August 2008	ITF Bucharest, Romania	Clay	(Ukraine) Lyudmyla Kichenok	(Romania) Laura Ioana Andrei (Romania) Irina-Camelia Begu	2–6, 6–3, [6–10]
Loss	5.	23 March 2009	ITF Moscow, Russia	Hard (i)	(Ukraine) Lyudmyla Kichenok	(Russia) Vitalia Diatchenko (Belarus) Ekaterina Dzehalevich	1–6, 1–6
Loss	6.	22 May 2009	ITF Kharkiv, Ukraine	Clay	(Ukraine) Lyudmyla Kichenok	(Belarus) Ksenia Milevskaya (Ukraine) Lesia Tsurenko	4–6, 4–6
Win	1.	13 September 2009	ITF Alphen aan den Rijn, Netherlands	Clay	(Ukraine) Lyudmyla Kichenok	(Netherlands) Chayenne Ewijk (Netherlands) Marlot Meddens	6–2, 4–6, [10–8]
Win	2.	16 October 2009	ITF Kharkiv, Ukraine	Carpet (i)	(Ukraine) Lyudmyla Kichenok	(Ukraine) Veronika Kapshay (Latvia) Irina Kuzmina	2–6, 6–2, [10–3]
Win	3.	1 November 2009	ITF Stockholm, Sweden	Hard (i)	(Ukraine) Lyudmyla Kichenok	(Russia) Alexandra Artamonova (Belarus) Lidziya Marozava	6–3, 6–1
Win	4.	14 November 2009	ITF Minsk, Belarus	Hard (i)	(Ukraine) Lyudmyla Kichenok	(Russia) Vesna Mansieva (Russia) Evgeniya Rodina	6–3, 7–6^{(7)}
Loss	7.	22 November 2009	ITF Opole, Poland	Carpet (i)	(Ukraine) Lyudmyla Kichenok	(Serbia) Ana Jovanović (Germany) Justine Ozga	4–6, 4–6
Loss	8.	7 February 2010	ITF Rancho Mirage, United States	Hard	(Ukraine) Lyudmyla Kichenok	(Australia) Monique Adamczak (United States) Abigail Spears	3–6, 4–6
Loss	9.	28 March 2010	ITF Moscow, Russia	Hard (i)	(Ukraine) Lyudmyla Kichenok	(Russia) Nina Bratchikova (France) Irena Pavlovic	7–6^{(4)}, 2–6, [3–10]
Loss	10.	3 April 2010	Yugra Cup, Russia	Carpet (i)	(Ukraine) Lyudmyla Kichenok	(Russia) Alexandra Panova (Russia) Ksenia Pervak	6–7^{(7)}, 6–2, [7–10]
Win	5.	8 May 2010	ITF Kharkiv, Ukraine	Hard	(Ukraine) Lyudmyla Kichenok	(Ukraine) Kateryna Kozlova (Ukraine) Elina Svitolina	6–4, 6–2
Loss	11.	21 May 2010	ITF Kharkiv, Ukraine	Clay	(Ukraine) Lyudmyla Kichenok	(Ukraine) Katerina Avdiyenko (Belarus) Ksenia Milevskaya	4–6, 2–6
Loss	12.	27 June 2010	ITF Périgueux, France	Clay	(Ukraine) Lyudmyla Kichenok	(Netherlands) Elise Tamaëla (Germany) Scarlett Werner	2–6, 1–6
Loss	13.	3 July 2010	ITF Mont-de-Marsan, France	Clay	(France) Constance Sibille	(Spain) Lara Arruabarrena (Spain) Inès Ferrer Suarez	3–6, 1–6
Win	6.	10 October 2010	Open de Limoges, France	Hard (i)	(Ukraine) Lyudmyla Kichenok	(France) Claire Feuerstein (France) Caroline Garcia	6–7^{(5)}, 6–4, [10–8]
Win	7.	26 March 2011	ITF Moscow, Russia	Hard (i)	(Ukraine) Lyudmyla Kichenok	(Russia) Alexandra Panova (Russia) Olga Panova	6–3, 6–3
Win	8.	30 April 2011	ITF Minsk, Belarus	Hard (i)	(Ukraine) Lyudmyla Kichenok	(Serbia) Teodora Mirčić (Austria) Nicole Rottmann	6–1, 6–2
Loss	14.	5 June 2011	Přerov Cup, Czech Republic	Clay	(Ukraine) Lyudmyla Kichenok	(Czech Republic) Kateřina Kramperová (Czech Republic) Karolína Plíšková	3–6, 4–6
Win	9.	16 October 2011	Open de Touraine, France	Hard (i)	(Ukraine) Lyudmyla Kichenok	(Greece) Eirini Gergatou (France) Irena Pavlovic	6–2, 6–0
Win	10.	6 November 2011	ITF Istanbul, Turkey	Hard (i)	(Ukraine) Lyudmyla Kichenok	(Bosnia and Herzegovina) Mervana Jugić-Salkić (Croatia) Ana Vrljić	4–6, 6–1, [10–7]
Loss	15.	22 January 2012	ITF Stuttgart, Germany	Hard (i)	(Ukraine) Lyudmyla Kichenok	(Poland) Paula Kania (Russia) Ksenia Lykina	3–6, 4–6
Win	11.	20 May 2012	Fergana Challenger, Uzbekistan	Hard	(Ukraine) Lyudmyla Kichenok	(Uzbekistan) Albina Khabibulina (Ukraine) Anastasiya Vasylyeva	6–4, 6–1
Win	12.	16 June 2012	ITF Bukhara, Uzbekistan	Hard	(Ukraine) Lyudmyla Kichenok	(Ukraine) Valentina Ivakhnenko (Ukraine) Kateryna Kozlova	7–5, 7–5
Win	13.	21 July 2012	ITF Donetsk, Ukraine	Hard	(Ukraine) Lyudmyla Kichenok	(Ukraine) Valentyna Ivakhnenko (Ukraine) Kateryna Kozlova	6–2, 7–5
Loss	16.	28 July 2012	President's Cup, Kazakhstan	Hard	(Ukraine) Lyudmyla Kichenok	(Georgia (country)) Oksana Kalashnikova (Russia) Marta Sirotkina	6–3, 4–6, [2–10]
Loss	17.	18 August 2012	Tatarstan Open, Russia	Hard	(Ukraine) Lyudmyla Kichenok	(Ukraine) Valentyna Ivakhnenko (Ukraine) Kateryna Kozlova	4–6, 7–6^{(6)}, [4–10]
Win	14.	3 November 2012	ITF Netanya, Israel	Hard	(Ukraine) Lyudmyla Kichenok	(Slovakia) Zuzana Luknarová (Slovakia) Anna Karolína Schmiedlová	6–1, 6–4
Loss	18.	10 November 2012	ITF Minsk, Belarus	Hard (i)	(Ukraine) Lyudmyla Kichenok	(Belarus) Ekaterina Dzehalevich (Belarus) Aliaksandra Sasnovich	6–1, 2–6, [3–10]
Win	15.	18 November 2012	ITF Helsinki, Finland	Carpet (i)	(Ukraine) Lyudmyla Kichenok	(Ukraine) Irina Buryachok (Russia) Valeriya Solovyeva	6–3, 6–3
Win	16.	11 January 2013	Blossom Cup, China	Hard	(Ukraine) Irina Buryachok	(China) Liang Chen (China) Sun Shengnan	3–6, 6–3, [12–10]
Loss	19.	30 March 2013	ITF Tallinn, Estonia	Hard (i)	(Ukraine) Lyudmyla Kichenok	(Estonia) Anett Kontaveit (Latvia) Jeļena Ostapenko	6–2, 5–7, [0–10]
Win	17.	28 April 2013	ITF Istanbul, Turkey	Hard	(Russia) Ekaterina Bychkova	(Turkey) Başak Eraydın (Bulgaria) Aleksandrina Naydenova	3–6, 6–2, [10–5]
Win	18.	27 July 2013	President's Cup, Kazakhstan	Hard	(Ukraine) Lyudmyla Kichenok	(Russia) Nina Bratchikova (Russia) Valeriya Solovyeva	6–2, 6–2
Win	19.	9 November 2013	ITF Astana, Kazakhstan	Hard (i)	(Ukraine) Lyudmyla Kichenok	(Russia) Alexandra Artamonova (Russia) Eugeniya Pashkova	6–1, 6–1
Loss	20.	15 November 2013	Dubai Tennis Challenge, UAE	Hard	(Ukraine) Lyudmyla Kichenok	(Ukraine) Olga Savchuk (Russia) Vitalia Diatchenko	5–7, 1–6
Win	20.	1 November 2014	Open Nantes Atlantique, France	Hard (i)	(Ukraine) Lyudmyla Kichenok	(France) Stéphanie Foretz (France) Amandine Hesse	6–2, 6–3
Win	21.	21 February 2015	ITF Kreuzlingen, Switzerland	Carpet (i)	(Ukraine) Lyudmyla Kichenok	(France) Stéphanie Foretz (France) Irina Ramialison	6–3, 6–3
Win	22.	26 April 2015	ITF Istanbul, Turkey	Hard	(Ukraine) Lyudmyla Kichenok	(Russia) Valentyna Ivakhnenko (Russia) Polina Monova	6–4, 6–3
Loss	21.	5 February 2016	Launceston International, Australia	Hard	(Luxembourg) Mandy Minella	(China) You Xiaodi (China) Zhu Lin	6–2, 5–7, [7–10]
Win	23.	20 March 2016	ITF Irapuato, Mexico	Hard	(Ukraine) Lyudmyla Kichenok	(Japan) Akiko Omae (India) Prarthana Thombare	6–1, 6–4
Loss	22.	11 March 2017	Zhuhai Open, China	Hard	(Ukraine) Lyudmyla Kichenok	(Netherlands) Lesley Kerkhove (Belarus) Lidziya Marozava	4–6, 2–6
Win	24.	19 March 2017	Pingshan Open, China	Hard	(Ukraine) Lyudmyla Kichenok	(Japan) Eri Hozumi (Russia) Valeria Savinykh	6–4, 6–4
