= 2022 Tallinn Open – Singles =

Women's tennis tournament held in Tallinn, Estonia

Singles
- 2022 Tallinn Open

Final
- Champion: (Czech Republic) Barbora Krejčíková
- Runner-up: (Estonia) Anett Kontaveit
- Score: 6–2, 6–3

Details
- Draw: 32
- Seeds: 8

Events
Singles	Doubles
Tallinn Open

Barbora Krejčíková defeated Anett Kontaveit in the final, 6–2, 6–3 to win the singles tennis title at the 2022 Tallinn Open.

This was the first edition of the event.

== Seeds ==
1. (Estonia) Anett Kontaveit (final)
2. (Switzerland) Belinda Bencic (semifinals)
3. (Brazil) Beatriz Haddad Maia (quarterfinals)
4. (United States) Madison Keys (first round)
5. (Latvia) Jeļena Ostapenko (first round)
6. (Kazakhstan) Elena Rybakina (withdrew)
7. (Czech Republic) Barbora Krejčíková (champion)
8. (China) Zhang Shuai (second round)
9. (Switzerland) Jil Teichmann (second round)

== Draw ==
=== Key ===
- Q = Qualifier
- WC = Wild card
- LL = Lucky loser
- Alt = Alternate
- ITF = ITF entry
- PR = Protected ranking
- SR = Special ranking
- SE = Special exempt
- JE = Junior exempt
- JR = Junior Accelerator Programme entrant
- CO = College Accelerator Programme entrant
- NG = Next Gen Accelerator Program entrant
- w/o = Walkover
- r = Retired
- d = Defaulted

=== Finals ===
Semifinals
1	(Estonia) Anett Kontaveit	6	6
(Estonia) Kaia Kanepi	4	4
7	(Czech Republic) Barbora Krejčíková	6^{5}	7^{7}	6
2	(Switzerland) Belinda Bencic	7^{7}	6^{2}	2

Final
1	(Estonia) Anett Kontaveit	2	3
7	(Czech Republic) Barbora Krejčíková	6	6

=== Top half ===
First round
1	(Estonia) A Kontaveit	3	6	7
(China) Xiy Wang	6	2	5
LL	(Sweden) M Björklund	6^{6}	3
(Czech Republic) T Martincová	7^{8}	6
Q	(Belgium) Y Bonaventure	6	6
(United States) S Rogers	4	4
PR	(Germany) L Siegemund	4	6^{7}
9	(Switzerland) J Teichmann	6	7^{9}
4	(United States) M Keys	3	2
Q	(Switzerland) V Golubic	6	6
WC	(Czech Republic) K Muchová	6	6
Q	(France) J Ponchet	0	2
(United States) C Liu	2	5
(United States) A Li	6	7
(Estonia) K Kanepi	4	6	6
5	(Latvia) J Ostapenko	6	4	0

Second round
1	(Estonia) A Kontaveit	6	6
(Czech Republic) T Martincová	2	1
Q	(Belgium) Y Bonaventure	7^{10}	6
9	(Switzerland) J Teichmann	6^{8}	3
Q	(Switzerland) V Golubic	6	0	2
WC	(Czech Republic) K Muchová	4	6	6
(United States) A Li	5	5
(Estonia) K Kanepi	7	7

Quarterfinals
1	(Estonia) A Kontaveit	6	3	6
Q	(Belgium) Y Bonaventure	3	6	3
WC	(Czech Republic) K Muchová	2	6	6^{6}
(Estonia) K Kanepi	6	3	7^{8}

Semifinals
1	(Estonia) A Kontaveit	6	6
(Estonia) K Kanepi	4	4

=== Bottom half ===
First round
7	(Czech Republic) B Krejčíková	6	7^{7}
(Australia) A Tomljanović	1	6^{3}
(Ukraine) M Kostyuk	6	4	6
(United States) B Pera	4	6	3
(France) D Parry	6	3	4
Q	(Czech Republic) L Nosková	2	6	6
(China) Xin Wang	3	6	4
3	(Brazil) B Haddad Maia	6	1	6
8	(China) S Zhang	7^{7}	7^{10}
Q	(Slovakia) V Kužmová	6^{4}	6^{8}
(Croatia) D Vekić	6	6
WC	(Estonia) M Nuudi	2	0
Q	(United Kingdom) K Boulter	6	6
(Romania) J Cristian	3	1
WC	(Estonia) E Malõgina	0	2
2	(Switzerland) B Bencic	6	6

Second round
7	(Czech Republic) B Krejčíková	7	6
(Ukraine) M Kostyuk	5	3
Q	(Czech Republic) L Nosková	1	5
3	(Brazil) B Haddad Maia	6	7
8	(China) S Zhang	2	4
(Croatia) D Vekić	6	6
Q	(United Kingdom) K Boulter	4	7^{7}	3
2	(Switzerland) B Bencic	6	6^{2}	6

Quarterfinals
7	(Czech Republic) B Krejčíková	6	6
3	(Brazil) B Haddad Maia	3	4
(Croatia) D Vekić	4	1
2	(Switzerland) B Bencic	6	6

Semifinals
7	(Czech Republic) B Krejčíková	6^{5}	7^{7}	6
2	(Switzerland) B Bencic	7^{7}	6^{2}	2

== Qualifying ==
=== Seeds ===
1. (Serbia) Aleksandra Krunić (first round, retired)
2. (Switzerland) Viktorija Golubic (qualified)
3. (Romania) Elena-Gabriela Ruse (first round)
4. (Czech Republic) Linda Nosková (qualified)
5. (Ukraine) Daria Snigur (qualifying competition)
6. (Sweden) Mirjam Björklund (qualifying competition, lucky loser)
7. (United Kingdom) Jodie Burrage (first round)
8. (Belgium) Ysaline Bonaventure (qualified)
9. (Germany) Anna-Lena Friedsam (qualifying competition)
10. (United Kingdom) Heather Watson (qualifying competition)
11. (United Kingdom) Katie Boulter (qualified)
12. (Slovakia) Viktória Kužmová (qualified)

=== Qualifiers ===
1. (Slovakia) Viktória Kužmová
2. (Switzerland) Viktorija Golubic
3. (France) Jessika Ponchet
4. (Czech Republic) Linda Nosková
5. (United Kingdom) Katie Boulter
6. (Belgium) Ysaline Bonaventure

=== Lucky loser ===
1. (Sweden) Mirjam Björklund

=== Qualifying draw ===
==== First qualifier ====
First round
1	(Serbia) Aleksandra Krunić	6	5^{r}
(Germany) Eva Lys	4	4
(United States) Caty McNally	7	5	2
12	(Slovakia) Viktória Kužmová	5	7	6

Qualifying competition
(Germany) Eva Lys	6	3	2
12	(Slovakia) Viktória Kužmová	1	6	6

==== Second qualifier ====
First round
2	(Switzerland) Viktorija Golubic	6	6
WC	(Latvia) Daniela Vismane	1	1
WC	(Estonia) Katriin Saar	1	3
9	(Germany) Anna-Lena Friedsam	6	6

Qualifying competition
2	(Switzerland) Viktorija Golubic	4	6	6
9	(Germany) Anna-Lena Friedsam	6	2	1

==== Third qualifier ====
First round
3	(Romania) Elena-Gabriela Ruse	3	6	6^{4}
(Spain) Marina Bassols Ribera	6	2	7^{7}
(France) Jessika Ponchet	2	6	6
7	(United Kingdom) Jodie Burrage	6	3	4

Qualifying competition
(Spain) Marina Bassols Ribera	2	3
(France) Jessika Ponchet	6	6

==== Fourth qualifier ====
First round
4	(Czech Republic) Linda Nosková	6	6
(Netherlands) Lesley Pattinama Kerkhove	3	4
WC	(Estonia) Liisa Varul	1	1
10	(United Kingdom) Heather Watson	6	6

Qualifying competition
4	(Czech Republic) Linda Nosková	6	7^{7}
10	(United Kingdom) Heather Watson	1	6^{0}

==== Fifth qualifier ====
First round
5	(Ukraine) Daria Snigur	4	6	6
(Netherlands) Suzan Lamens	6	2	3
WC	(United States) Ingrid Neel	0	2
11	(United Kingdom) Katie Boulter	6	6

Qualifying competition
5	(Ukraine) Daria Snigur	6	4	3
11	(United Kingdom) Katie Boulter	1	6	6

==== Sixth qualifier ====
First round
6	(Sweden) Mirjam Björklund	6	6
(Greece) Valentini Grammatikopoulou	2	2
(Spain) Georgina García Pérez	2	2
8	(Belgium) Ysaline Bonaventure	6	6

Qualifying competition
6	(Sweden) Mirjam Björklund	5	4
8	(Belgium) Ysaline Bonaventure	7	6
