= WTA International tournaments =

Tournament category in women's tennis

The WTA International tournaments was a category for tennis tournaments of the Women's Tennis Association from the 2009 WTA Tour until 2020, which replaced the previous Tier III and Tier IV categories. As of 2021, these events have been reclassified as WTA 250 tournaments. The winner of a WTA 250 tournament adds 250 points to her WTA ranking.

For the 2025 season, there were 21 WTA 250, all knock-out tournaments with a prize money for every event at $275,094.

== Events ==
=== Current WTA 250 ===
Tournament	Sponsored name	City	Country	Surface	Draw	First Edition
Auckland Open	ASB Classic	Auckland	New Zealand	Hard	32	2009
Hobart International	Hobart International	Hobart	Australia	Hard	32	2009
Singapore Open	Singapore Tennis Open	Singapore	Singapore	Hard	32	2025
Transylvania Open	Transylvania Open	Cluj-Napoca	Romania	Hard (i)	32	2021
ATX Open	ATX Open	Austin, Texas	(United States) USA	Hard	32	2023
Copa Colsanitas	Copa Colsanitas presentado por Zürich	Bogotá	Colombia	Clay (red)	32	2009
Open de Rouen	Open Rouen Capfinances Métropole	Rouen	France	Clay (i)	32	2024
Morocco Open	Grand Prix de SAR La Princesse Lalla Meryem	Rabat	Morocco	Clay (red)	32	2009
Rosmalen Championships	Libéma Open	's-Hertogenbosch	Netherlands	Grass	32	2009
Nottingham Open	Lexus Nottingham Open	Nottingham	(United Kingdom) Great Britain	Grass	32	2015
Eastbourne Open	Lexus Eastbourne Open	Eastbourne	(United Kingdom) Great Britain	Grass	32	2025
Hamburg Open	MSC Hamburg Ladies Open	Hamburg	Germany	Clay (red)	32	2021
Iași Open	UniCredit Iași Open	Iași	Romania	Clay (red)	32	2024
Prague Open	Livesport Prague Open	Prague	(Czech Republic) Czechia	Clay (red)	32	2015
Tennis in the Land	Tennis in the Land	Cleveland	(United States) USA	Hard	32	2021
SP Open	São Paulo Open de Tênis	São Paulo	(Brazil) Brasil	Hard	32	2025
Japan Open	Japan Women's Open	Osaka	Japan	Hard	32	2009
Jiangxi Open	Jiangxi International Women's Tennis Open	Nanchang	China	Hard	32	2016
Guangzhou Open	Guangzhou International Women's Open	Guangzhou	China	Hard	32	2009
Hong Kong Open	Hong Kong Open	Hong Kong	Hong Kong	Hard	32	2014
Chennai Open	Chennai Open	SDAT Tennis Stadium	India	Hard	32	2025

=== Defunct ===
Tournament	Sponsored name	City	Country	Surface	Draw	First Edition	Last Edition
Amelia Island Championships	MPS Group Championships	Ponte Vedra Beach	United States	Clay (green)	32	2009	2010
Brisbane International	Brisbane International	Brisbane	Australia	Hard	32	2009	2011
Marbella Open	Andalucia Tennis Experience	Marbella	Spain	Clay (red)	32	2009	2011
Barcelona Open	Barcelona Ladies Open	Barcelona	Spain	Clay (red)	32	2009	2012
Danish Open	e-Boks Danish Open	Copenhagen	Denmark	Hard (i)	32	2010	2012
Texas Tennis Open	Texas Tennis Open	Dallas	United States	Hard	32	2011	2012
U.S. Indoors	Cellular South Cup	Memphis	United States	Hard (i)	32	2009	2013
WTA Tournament of Champions	Garanti Koza WTA Tournament of Champions	Sofia	Bulgaria	Hard (i)	8	2012	2014
Portugal Open	Estoril Open	Estoril	Portugal	Clay (red)	32	2009	2014
Thailand Open	PTT Pattaya Open	Pattaya City	Thailand	Hard	32	2009	2015
Gastein Ladies	Nurnberger Gastein Ladies	Bad Gastein	Austria	Clay (red)	32	2009	2015
Baku Cup	Baku Cup	Baku	Azerbaijan	Hard	32	2011	2015
Rio Open	Rio Open	Rio de Janeiro	Brazil	Clay (red)	32	2014	2016
Katowice Open	BNP Paribas Katowice Open	Katowice	Poland	Hard (i)	32	2013	2016
Brasil Tennis Cup	Brasil Tennis Cup	Florianópolis	Brazil	Hard	32	2013	2016
Malaysian Open	Alya Malaysian Open	Kuala Lumpur	Malaysia	Hard	32	2010	2017
Swedish Open	Swedish Open	Båstad	Sweden	Clay (red)	32	2009	2017
Taiwan Open	Taiwan Open	Taipei	Taiwan	Hard	32	2016	2018
Moscow River Cup	Moscow River Cup	Moscow	Russia	Clay (red)	32	2018	2018
Tournoi de Québec	Coupe Banque Nationale	Quebec City	Canada	Carpet (i)	32	2009	2018
Bucharest Open	BRD Bucharest Open	Bucharest	Romania	Clay (red)	32	2014	2019
Ladies Open Lugano	Ladies Open Lugano	Lugano	Switzerland	Clay (red)	32	2017	2019
Nuremberg Cup	Nürnberger Versicherungscup	Nürnberg	Germany	Clay (red)	32	2013	2019
Mallorca Open	Mallorca Open	Mallorca	Spain	Grass	32	2016	2019
Baltic Open	Baltic Open	Jūrmala	Latvia	Clay (red)	32	2019	2019
Bronx Open	NYJTL Bronx Open	The Bronx, New York City	United States	Hard	32	2019	2019
Tashkent Open	Tashkent Open	Tashkent	Uzbekistan	Hard	32	2009	2019
Tianjin Open	Tianjin Open	Tianjin	China	Hard	32	2014	2019
Shenzhen Open	Shenzhen Longhua Open	Shenzhen	China	Hard	32	2013	2020
Mexican Open	Abierto Mexicano TELCEL	Acapulco	Mexico	Hard	32	2009	2020
Luxembourg Open	BGL BNP Paribas Luxembourg Open	Luxembourg City	Luxembourg	Hard (i)	32	2009	2021
İstanbul Cup	TEB BNP Paribas İstanbul Cup	Istanbul	Turkey	Clay (red)	32	2009	2022
Abierto Zapopan	Abierto Akron Zapopan	Zapopan	Mexico	Hard	32	2021	2022
Slovenia Open	Banka Koper Slovenia Open	Portorož	Slovenia	Hard	32	2009	2022
Tallinn Open	Tallinn Open	Tallinn	Estonia	Hard	32	2022	2022
Swiss Open	Ladies Open Lausanne	Lausanne	Switzerland	Clay (red)	32	2016	2023
WTA Lyon Open	Open 6ème Sens Métropole de Lyon	Lyon	France	Hard (i)	32	2020	2023
Hua Hin	Thailand Open	Hua Hin	Thailand	Hard	32	2024	2024
Budapest Grand Prix	Hungarian Grand Prix	Budapest	Hungary	Clay (red)	32	2009	2024
Jasmin Open	Jasmin Open	Monastir, Tunisia	Tunisia	Hard	32	2022	2024

=== Upgraded to WTA 500 ===
Tournament	Sponsored name	City	Country	Surface	Draw	First Edition	Last Edition
Washington Open	Citi Open	Washington D.C.	United States	Hard	32	2011	2022
Linz Open	Upper Austria Ladies Linz	Linz	Austria	Hard (i)	32	2009	2023
Internationaux de Strasbourg	Internationaux de Strasbourg	Strasbourg	France	Clay (red)	32	1987	2023
Bad Homburg Open	Bad Homburg Open presented by Engel & Volkers	Bad Homburg	Germany	Grass	32	2020	2023
Monterrey Open	Abierto GNP Seguros	Monterrey	Mexico	Hard	32	2009	2023
Korea Open	Hana Bank Korea Open	Seoul	South Korea	Hard	32	2009	2023
Ningbo Open	Ningbo International Tennis Open	Ningbo	China	Hard	32	2023	2023
Mérida Open	Mérida Open Akron	Mérida, Yucatán	Mexico	Hard	32	2023	2024

=== Downgraded to WTA 125 ===
Tournament	Sponsored name	City	Country	Surface	Draw	First Edition	Last Edition
Birmingham Classic	Rothesay Classic Birmingham	Birmingham	United Kingdom	Grass	56	2009	2024
Hamburg European Open	Hamburg Open	Hamburg	Germany	Clay (red)	32	2021	2023
WTA Poland Open	BNP Paribas Warsaw Open	Warsaw	Poland	Hard	32	2021	2023
Palermo Open	Palermo Ladies Open	Palermo	Italy	Clay (red)	32	2009	2024

== Winners by tournament ==
=== Singles ===
==== Current tournaments ====
	2009	2010	2011	2012	2013	2014	2015	2016	2017	2018	2019	2020
Auckland	(Russia) E. Dementieva (1/1)	(Belgium) Wickmayer (3/5)	(Hungary) G. Arn (1/1)	(China) J. Zheng (1/1)	(Poland) A. Radwańska (1/4)	(Serbia) Ivanovic (4/5)	(United States) V. Williams (4/6)	(United States) Stephens (2/3)	(United States) L. Davis (1/1)	(Germany) Görges (3/5)	(Germany) Görges (5/5)	(United States) S. Williams (2/2)
Shenzhen	Not an Event				(China) Li (2/3)	(China) Li (3/3)	(Romania) Halep (6/9)	(Poland) A. Radwańska (4/4)	(Czech Republic) K. Siniaková (1/2)	(Romania) Halep (8/9)	(Belarus) A. Sabalenka (1/3)	(Russia) E. Alexandrova (1/1)
Hobart	(Czech Republic) P. Kvitová (1/5)	(Ukraine) A. Bondarenko (1/1)	(Australia) Gajdošová (2/2)	(Germany) M. Barthel (1/3)	(Russia) E. Vesnina (1/1)	(Spain) G. Muguruza (1/3)	(United Kingdom) Watson (2/4)	(France) Cornet (4/5)	(Belgium) E. Mertens (1/4)	(Belgium) Mertens (2/4)	(United States) S. Kenin (1/4)	(Kazakhstan) Rybakina (2/2)
Hua Hin	Not an Event										(Ukraine) Yastremska (2/3)	(Poland) Linette (2/2)
Acapulco	(United States) V. Williams (1/6)	(United States) V. Williams (2/6)	(Argentina) G. Dulko (1/1)	(Italy) S. Errani (1/6)	(Italy) Errani (5/6)	(Slovakia) D. Cibulková (1/3)	(Switzerland) Bacsinszky (2/4)	(United States) Stephens (3/3)	(Ukraine) Tsurenko (3/4)	(Ukraine) Tsurenko (4/4)	(China) Y. Wang (1/1)	(United Kingdom) Watson (4/4)
Lyon	Not an Event											(United States) Kenin (4/4)
Monterrey	(France) M. Bartoli (1/2)	(Russia) A. Pavlyuchenkova (1/10)	(Russia) Pavlyuchenkova (3/10)	(Hungary) T. Babos (1/3)	(Russia) Pavlyuchenkova (4/10)	(Serbia) Ivanovic (5/5)	(Switzerland) Bacsinszky (3/4)	(United Kingdom) Watson (3/4)	(Russia) Pavlyuchenkova (7/10)	(Spain) Muguruza (2/3)	(Spain) Muguruza (3/3)	(Ukraine) Svitolina (7/8)
Bogotá	(Spain) MJ. Martínez Sánchez (1/4)	(Colombia) M. Duque-Mariño (1/1)	(Spain) L. Domínguez Lino (1/1)	(Spain) L. Arruabarrena (1/2)	(Serbia) Janković (2/4)	(France) C. Garcia (1/5)	(Brazil) T. Pereira (1/2)	(United States) I. Falconi (1/1)	(Italy) Schiavone (5/5)	(Slovakia) Schmiedlová (3/3)	(United States) A. Anisimova (1/1)	Cancelled due to the coronavirus pandemic
Marrakech/Rabat	(Spain) A. Medina Garrigues (1/3)	(Czech Republic) I. Benešová (1/1)	(Italy) A. Brianti (1/1)	(Netherlands) K. Bertens (1/5)	(Italy) Schiavone (3/5)	(Spain) MT. Torró Flor (1/1)	(Ukraine) Svitolina (3/8)	(Switzerland) Bacsinszky (4/4)	(Russia) Pavlyuchenkova (8/10)	(Belgium) Mertens (4/4)	(Greece) M. Sakkari (1/1)	Cancelled due to the coronavirus pandemic
Nottingham	Not an Event						(Croatia) A. Konjuh (1/1)	(Czech Republic) Ka. Plíšková (5/5)	(Croatia) Vekić (2/2)	(Australia) Barty (2/3)	(France) Garcia (5/5)	Cancelled due to the coronavirus pandemic
's-Hertogenbosch	(Thailand) T. Tanasugarn (1/2)	(Belgium) J. Henin (1/1)	(Italy) Vinci (4/8)	(Russia) Petrova (2/3)	(Romania) Halep (2/9)	(United States) C. Vandeweghe (1/2)	(Italy) C. Giorgi (1/2)	(United States) Vandeweghe (2/2)	(Estonia) A. Kontaveit (1/1)	(Serbia) A. Krunić (1/1)	(United States) Riske (2/2)	Cancelled due to the coronavirus pandemic
Birmingham	(Slovakia) M. Rybáriková (1/4)	(China) N. Li (1/3)	(Germany) S. Lisicki (1/3)	(United States) M. Oudin (1/1)	(Slovakia) Hantuchová (3/4)	WTA Premier Event						Cancelled due to the coronavirus pandemic
Bad Homburg	Not an Event											Cancelled due to the coronavirus pandemic
Bucharest	Not an Event					(Romania) Halep (5/9)	(Slovakia) Schmiedlová (2/3)	(Romania) Halep (7/9)	(Romania) Begu (4/4)	(Latvia) Sevastova (3/4)	(Kazakhstan) E. Rybakina (1/2)	Cancelled due to the coronavirus pandemic
Gstaad/Lausanne	Not an Event							(Switzerland) V. Golubic (1/1)	(Netherlands) Bertens (4/5)	(France) Cornet (5/5)	(France) F. Ferro (1/2)	Cancelled due to the coronavirus pandemic
Jūrmala	Not an Event										(Latvia) Sevastova (4/4)	Cancelled due to the coronavirus pandemic
Washington D.C.	Not an Event		(Russia) N. Petrova (1/3)	(Slovakia) Rybáriková (3/4)	(Slovakia) Rybáriková (4/4)	(Russia) S. Kuznetsova (1/2)	(United States) S. Stephens (1/3)	(Belgium) Wickmayer (5/5)	(Russia) Makarova (2/2)	(Russia) Kuznetsova (2/2)	(United States) J. Pegula (1/1)	Cancelled due to the coronavirus pandemic
Palermo	(Italy) F. Pennetta (1/2)	(Estonia) K. Kanepi (1/2)	(Spain) Medina Garrigues (3/3)	(Italy) Errani (4/6)	(Italy) Vinci (8/8)	Not an Event					(Switzerland) Teichmann (2/2)	(France) Ferro (2/2)
Prague	Not an Event						(Czech Republic) Ka. Plíšková (4/5)	(Czech Republic) Šafářová (2/2)	(Germany) Barthel (3/3)	(Czech Republic) Kvitová (5/5)	(Switzerland) J. Teichmann (1/2)	(Romania) Halep (9/9)
Lexington	Not an Event											(United States) J. Brady (1/1)
Istanbul	(Russia) V. Dushevina (1/1)	(Russia) Pavlyuchenkova (2/10)	Not held			(Denmark) Wozniacki (7/9)	(Ukraine) L. Tsurenko (1/4)	(Turkey) Ç Büyükakçay (1/1)	(Ukraine) Svitolina (6/8)	(France) P. Parmentier (1/2)	(Croatia) P. Martić (1/1)	(Romania) PM. Țig (1/1)
Strasbourg	(France) A. Rezaï (1/3)	(Russia) Sharapova (2/3)	(Germany) Petkovic (2/4)	(Italy) Schiavone (2/5)	(France) Cornet (2/5)	(Puerto Rico) M. Puig (1/1)	(Australia) Stosur (4/6)	(France) Garcia (2/5)	(Australia) Stosur (6/6)	(Russia) Pavlyuchenkova (10/10)	(Ukraine) Yastremska (3/3)	(Ukraine) Svitolina (8/8)
Osaka/Tokyo/Hiroshima	(Australia) S. Stosur (1/6)	(Thailand) Tanasugarn (2/2)	(France) Bartoli (2/2)	(United Kingdom) H. Watson (1/4)	(Australia) Stosur (2/6)	(Australia) Stosur (3/6)	(Belgium) Wickmayer (4/5)	(United States) C. McHale (1/1)	(Kazakhstan) Z. Diyas (1/1)	(Chinese Taipei) Hsieh (3/3)	(Japan) Hibino (2/2)	Cancelled due to the coronavirus pandemic
Nanchang	Not an Event							(China) Y. Duan (1/1)	(China) Peng (2/2)	(China) Q. Wang (1/2)	(Sweden) R. Peterson (1/2)	Cancelled due to the coronavirus pandemic
Linz	(Belgium) Wickmayer (2/5)	(Serbia) A. Ivanovic (1/5)	(Czech Republic) Kvitová (3/5)	(Belarus) Azarenka (5/5)	(Germany) Kerber (2/2)	(Czech Republic) Ka. Plíšková (3/5)	(Russia) Pavlyuchenkova (6/10)	(Slovakia) Cibulková (3/3)	(Czech Republic) Strýcová (2/2)	(Italy) Giorgi (2/2)	(United States) C. Gauff (1/1)	(Belarus) Sabalenka (3/3)
Seoul	(Japan) K. Date-Krumm (1/1)	(Russia) Kleybanova (2/2)	(Spain) Martínez Sánchez (4/4)	(Denmark) Wozniacki (5/9)	(Poland) A. Radwańska (2/4)	(Czech Republic) Ka. Plíšková (2/5)	(Romania) Begu (2/4)	(Spain) Arruabarrena (2/2)	(Latvia) J. Ostapenko (1/2)	(Netherlands) Bertens (5/5)	(Czech Republic) K. Muchová (1/1)	Cancelled due to the coronavirus pandemic
Guangzhou	(Israel) S. Pe'er (1/2)	(Australia) J. Gajdošová (1/2)	(South Africa) C. Scheepers (1/1)	(Chinese Taipei) Hsieh (2/3)	(China) S. Zhang (1/2)	(Romania) Niculescu (2/3)	(Serbia) Janković (3/4)	(Ukraine) Tsurenko (2/4)	(China) Zhang (2/2)	(China) Q. Wang (2/2)	(United States) Kenin (3/4)	Cancelled due to the coronavirus pandemic
Tianjin	Not an Event					(United States) A. Riske (1/2)	(Poland) A. Radwańska (3/4)	(China) S. Peng (1/2)	(Russia) Sharapova (3/3)	(France) Garcia (4/5)	(Sweden) Peterson (2/2)	Cancelled due to the coronavirus pandemic
Hong Kong	Not an Event					(Germany) Lisicki (3/3)	(Serbia) Janković (4/4)	(Denmark) Wozniacki (9/9)	(Russia) Pavlyuchenkova (9/10)	(Ukraine) D. Yastremska (1/3)	Canceled due to 2019–20 Hong Kong protests	Cancelled due to the coronavirus pandemic
Luxembourg City	(Switzerland) T. Bacsinszky (1/4)	(Italy) Vinci (2/8)	(Belarus) Azarenka (4/5)	(United States) V. Williams (3/6)	(Denmark) Wozniacki (6/9)	(Germany) A. Beck (1/2)	(Japan) M. Doi (1/1)	(Romania) Niculescu (3/3)	(Germany) C. Witthöft (1/1)	(Germany) Görges (4/5)	(Latvia) Ostapenko (2/2)	Cancelled due to the coronavirus pandemic
Zhuhai	Not an Event						(United States) V. Williams (5/6)	(Czech Republic) Kvitová (4/5)	(Germany) Görges (2/5)	(Australia) Barty (3/3)	(Belarus) Sabalenka (2/3)	Cancelled due to the coronavirus pandemic

==== Previous tournaments ====
	2009	2010	2011	2012	2013	2014	2015	2016	2017	2018	2019	2020
Ponte Vedra Beach	(Denmark) C. Wozniacki (1/9)	(Denmark) Wozniacki (2/9)	Not an Event
Portorož	(Russia) D. Safina (1/1)	(Russia) A. Chakvetadze (1/1)	Not an Event
Brisbane	(Belarus) V. Azarenka (1/5)	(Belgium) K. Clijsters (1/1)	(Czech Republic) Kvitová (2/5)	WTA Premier Event
Marbella	(Serbia) J. Janković (1/4)	(Italy) Pennetta (2/2)	(Belarus) Azarenka (3/5)	Not an Event
Barcelona	(Italy) R. Vinci (1/8)	(Italy) F. Schiavone (1/5)	(Italy) Vinci (3/8)	(Italy) Errani (2/6)	Not an Event
Copenhagen	Not an Event	(Denmark) Wozniacki (3/9)	(Denmark) Wozniacki (4/9)	(Germany) A. Kerber (1/2)	Not an Event
Dallas	Not an Event		(Germany) Lisicki (2/3)	(Italy) Vinci (6/8)	Not an Event
Memphis	(Belarus) Azarenka (2/5)	(Russia) M. Sharapova (1/3)	(Slovakia) Rybáriková (2/4)	(Sweden) S. Arvidsson (1/1)	(New Zealand) M. Erakovic (1/1)	Not an Event
Budapest	(Hungary) Á. Szávay (1/2)	(Hungary) Szávay (2/2)	(Italy) Vinci (5/8)	(Italy) Errani (3/6)	(Romania) Halep (3/9)	Not an Event
Estoril	(Belgium) Y. Wickmayer (1/5)	(Latvia) A. Sevastova (1/4)	(Spain) Medina Garrigues (2/3)	(Estonia) Kanepi (2/2)	(Russia) Pavlyuchenkova (5/10)	(Spain) C. Suárez Navarro (1/1)	Not an Event
Pattaya City	(Russia) V. Zvonareva (1/3)	(Russia) Zvonareva (2/3)	(Slovakia) D. Hantuchová (1/4)	(Slovakia) Hantuchová (2/4)	(Russia) M. Kirilenko (1/1)	(Russia) E. Makarova (1/2)	(Slovakia) Hantuchová (4/4)	Not an Event
Bad Gastein	(Germany) A. Petkovic (1/4)	(Germany) J. Görges (1/5)	(Spain) Martínez Sánchez (3/4)	(France) A. Cornet (1/5)	(Austria) Y. Meusburger (1/1)	(Germany) Petkovic (3/4)	(Australia) Stosur (5/6)	Not an Event
Baku	Not held		(Russia) Zvonareva (3/3)	(Serbia) B. Jovanovski (1/2)	(Ukraine) E. Svitolina (1/8)	(Ukraine) Svitolina (2/8)	(Russia) M. Gasparyan (1/2)	Not an Event
Rio de Janeiro	Not an Event					(Japan) K. Nara (1/1)	(Italy) Errani (6/6)	(Italy) Schiavone (4/5)	Not an Event
Katowice	Not an Event				(Italy) Vinci (7/8)	(France) Cornet (3/5)	(Slovakia) A.K. Schmiedlová (1/3)	(Slovakia) Cibulková (2/3)	Not an Event
Florianópolis	Not an Event				(Romania) M. Niculescu (1/3)	(Czech Republic) K. Zakopalová (1/1)	(Brazil) Pereira (2/2)	(Romania) Begu (3/4)	Not an Event
Kuala Lumpur	Not an Event	(Russia) A. Kleybanova (1/2)	(Australia) J. Dokic (1/1)	(Chinese Taipei) S-w. Hsieh (1/3)	(Czech Republic) Ka. Plíšková (1/5)	(Croatia) D. Vekić (1/2)	(Denmark) Wozniacki (8/9)	(Ukraine) Svitolina (4/8)	(Australia) A. Barty (1/3)	Not an Event
Båstad	(Spain) Martínez Sánchez (2/4)	(France) Rezaï (3/3)	(Slovenia) P. Hercog (1/3)	(Slovenia) Hercog (2/3)	(United States) S. Williams (1/2)	(Germany) Barthel (2/3)	(Sweden) J. Larsson (1/2)	(Germany) L. Siegemund (1/1)	(Czech Republic) Siniaková (2/2)	Not an Event
Kaohsiung/Taipei	Not an Event							(United States) V. Williams (6/6)	(Ukraine) Svitolina (5/8)	(Hungary) Babos (3/3)	Not an Event
Moscow	Not an Event									(Serbia) O. Danilović (1/1)	Not an Event
Québec City	(Hungary) M. Czink (1/1)	(Austria) T. Paszek (1/1)	(Czech Republic) B. Záhlavová-Strýcová (1/2)	(Belgium) K. Flipkens (1/1)	(Czech Republic) L. Šafářová (1/2)	(Croatia) M. Lučić-Baroni (1/1)	(Germany) Beck (2/2)	(France) O. Dodin (1/1)	(Belgium) A. Van Uytvanck (1/4)	(France) Parmentier (2/2)	Not an Event
Budapest	Not an Event								(Hungary) Babos (2/3)	(Belgium) Van Uytvanck (2/4)	(Belgium) Van Uytvanck (3/4)	Provisional move to Debrecen cancelled
Biel/Lugano	Not an Event								(Czech Republic) M. Vondroušová (1/1)	(Belgium) Mertens (3/4)	(Slovenia) Hercog (3/3)	Not an Event
Nürnberg	Not an Event				(Romania) S. Halep (1/9)	(Canada) E. Bouchard (1/1)	(Italy) Knapp (2/2)	(Netherlands) Bertens (2/5)	(Netherlands) Bertens (3/5)	(Sweden) Larsson (2/2)	(Kazakhstan) Y. Putintseva (1/1)	Not an Event
Mallorca	Not an Event							(France) Garcia (3/5)	(Latvia) Sevastova (2/4)	(Germany) T. Maria (1/1)	(United States) Kenin (2/4)	Not an Event
The Bronx	Not an Event										(Poland) M. Linette (1/2)	Not an Event
Tashkent	(Israel) Pe'er (2/2)	(Russia) A. Kudryavtseva (1/1)	(Russia) K. Pervak (1/1)	(Romania) IC. Begu (1/4)	(Serbia) Jovanovski (2/2)	(Italy) K. Knapp (1/2)	(Japan) N. Hibino (1/2)	(Czech Republic) Kr. Plíšková (1/1)	(Ukraine) K. Bondarenko (1/1)	(Russia) Gasparyan (2/2)	(Belgium) Van Uytvanck (4/4)	Not an Event
Bali; Sofia	(France) Rezaï (2/3)	(Serbia) Ivanovic (2/5)	(Serbia) Ivanovic (3/5)	(Russia) Petrova (3/3)	(Romania) Halep (4/9)	(Germany) Petkovic (4/4)	Not an Event

== See also ==
- WTA Premier tournaments
- WTA 250 tournaments
