= 2022 Tallinn Open – Doubles =

Women's tennis tournament held in Tallinn, Estonia

Doubles
- 2022 Tallinn Open

Final
- Champions: (Ukraine) Lyudmyla Kichenok (Ukraine) Nadiia Kichenok
- Runners-up: (United States) Nicole Melichar-Martinez (Germany) Laura Siegemund
- Score: 7–5, 4–6, [10–7]

Events
Singles	Doubles
Tallinn Open	· 2023 →

Lyudmyla and Nadiia Kichenok defeated Nicole Melichar-Martinez and Laura Siegemund in the final, 7–5, 4–6, [10–7] to win the doubles tennis title at the 2022 Tallinn Open.

This was the first edition of this event.

== Seeds ==
1. (United States) Nicole Melichar-Martinez / (Germany) Laura Siegemund (final)
2. (Norway) Ulrikke Eikeri / (Slovakia) Tereza Mihalíková (semifinals)
3. (Ukraine) Lyudmyla Kichenok / (Ukraine) Nadiia Kichenok (champions)
4. (Japan) Miyu Kato / (China) Wang Xinyu (semifinals)

== Draw ==
=== Key ===
- Q = Qualifier
- WC = Wild card
- LL = Lucky loser
- Alt = Alternate
- SE = Special exempt
- PR = Protected ranking
- ITF = ITF entry
- JE = Junior exempt
- w/o = Walkover
- r = Retired
- d = Defaulted
- SR = Special ranking

=== Draw ===
First round
1	(United States) N Melichar-Martinez (Germany) L Siegemund	3	7	[10]
(Estonia) A Kontaveit (New Zealand) E Routliffe	6	5	[6]
(Germany) A-L Friedsam (Slovakia) V Kužmová	6	6
(Spain) G García Pérez (China) Xiy Wang	1	3
4	(Japan) M Kato (China) Xin Wang	2	6	[10]
WC	(Estonia) E Malõgina (Estonia) M Nuudi	6	1	[4]
(France) J Ponchet (Australia) O Tjandramulia	6	6
WC	(Greece) V Grammatikopoulou (Latvia) D Vismane	2	1
(Romania) J Cristian (Germany) V Heisen	7^{10}	3	[2]
(Switzerland) B Bencic (Belgium) K Flipkens	6^{8}	6	[10]
(Netherlands) I Haverlag (India) P Thombare	3	4
3	(Ukraine) L Kichenok (Ukraine) N Kichenok	6	6
(United States) I Neel (Netherlands) R van der Hoek	1	1
(United Kingdom) A Barnett (United Kingdom) O Nicholls	6	6
(Georgia (country)) N Dzalamidze (Switzerland) V Golubic	2	1
2	(Norway) U Eikeri (Slovakia) T Mihalíková	6	6

Quarterfinals
1	(United States) N Melichar-Martinez (Germany) L Siegemund	6	6
(Germany) A-L Friedsam (Slovakia) V Kužmová	4	2
4	(Japan) M Kato (China) Xin Wang	6	7
(France) J Ponchet (Australia) O Tjandramulia	2	5
(Switzerland) B Bencic (Belgium) K Flipkens	3	2
3	(Ukraine) L Kichenok (Ukraine) N Kichenok	6	6
(United Kingdom) A Barnett (United Kingdom) O Nicholls	4	7	[5]
2	(Norway) U Eikeri (Slovakia) T Mihalíková	6	5	[10]

Semifinals
1	(United States) N Melichar-Martinez (Germany) L Siegemund	6	3	[10]
4	(Japan) M Kato (China) Xin Wang	3	6	[1]
3	(Ukraine) L Kichenok (Ukraine) N Kichenok	7^{7}	6
2	(Norway) U Eikeri (Slovakia) T Mihalíková	6^{4}	1

Final
1	(United States) N Melichar-Martinez (Germany) L Siegemund	5	6	[7]
3	(Ukraine) L Kichenok (Ukraine) N Kichenok	7	4	[10]
