= Lyudmyla Kichenok =

Ukrainian tennis player (born 1992)

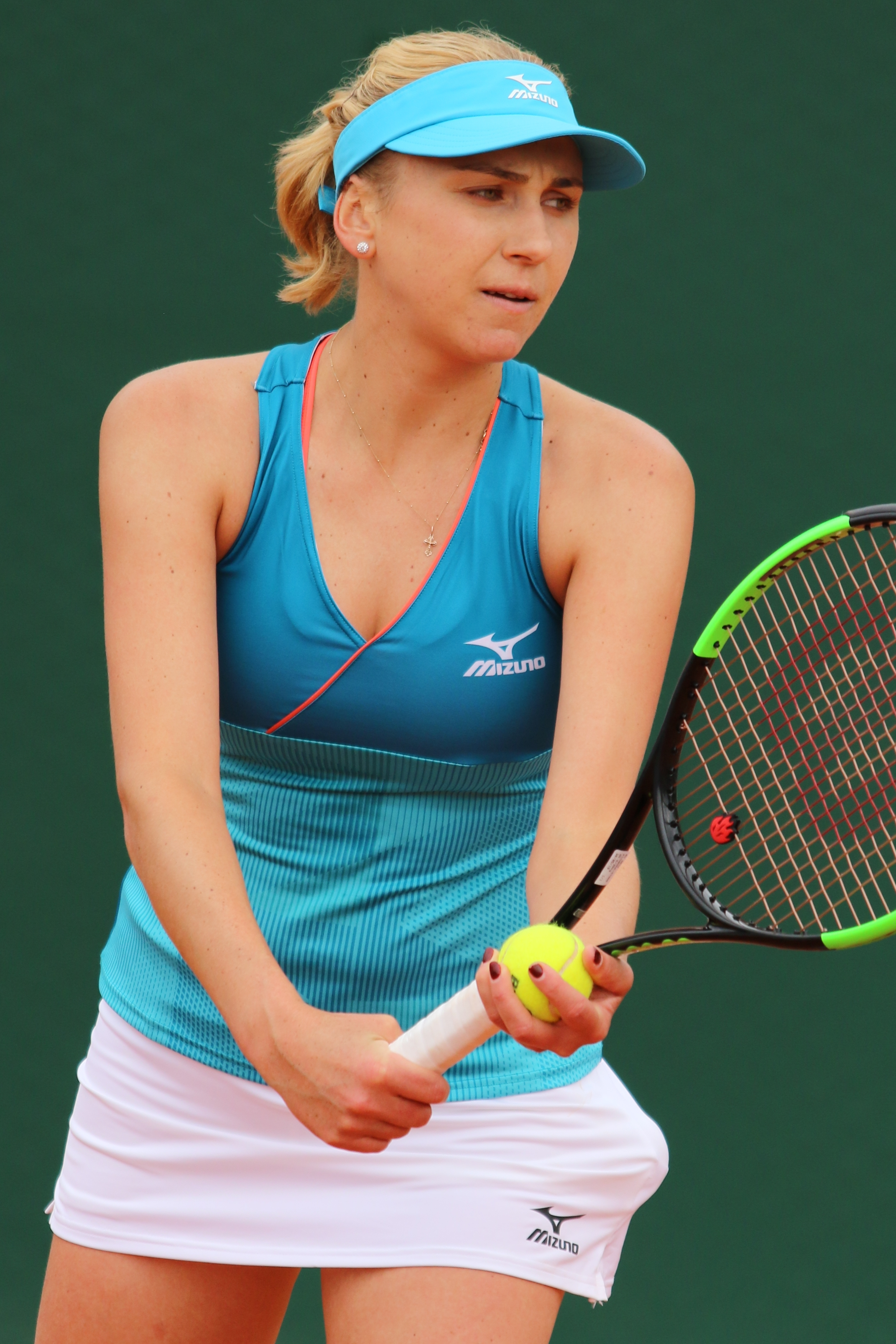
- Kichenok at the 2019 French Open
- Native name: Людмила Кіченок
- Country (sports): Ukraine
- Residence: Dnipro, Ukraine
- Born: 20 July 1992 (age 34) Dnipropetrovsk, Ukraine
- Height: 1.75 m (5 ft 9 in)
- Plays: Right (two-handed backhand)
- Prize money: $3,537,050

Singles
- Career record: 203–167
- Career titles: 0
- Highest ranking: No. 156 (21 July 2014)

Grand Slam singles results
- Australian Open: Q2 (2013)
- French Open: Q1 (2013, 2014)
- Wimbledon: Q2 (2014)
- US Open: Q1 (2013)

Doubles
- Career record: 501–350
- Career titles: 11
- Highest ranking: No. 3 (23 September 2024)
- Current ranking: No. 51 (14 September 2026)

Grand Slam doubles results
- Australian Open: F (2024)
- French Open: SF (2022)
- Wimbledon: SF (2022)
- US Open: W (2024)

Other doubles tournaments
- Tour Finals: SF (2022)
- Olympic Games: QF (2021, 2024)

Grand Slam mixed doubles results
- Australian Open: 2R (2022)
- French Open: QF (2025)
- Wimbledon: W (2023)
- US Open: 1R (2018, 2022, 2023, 2024)

Team competitions
- Fed Cup: SF (2025)
- Last updated on: 16 September 2026.

Lyudmyla Viktorivna Kichenok (Ukrainian: Людмила Вікторівна Кіченок, IPA: [lʲʊdˈmɪlɐ ˈwiktor⁽ʲ⁾iu̯nɐ kitʃeˈnɔk]; born 20 July 1992) is a Ukrainian professional tennis player. She has been ranked as high as world No. 3 in doubles. She is a two-time Grand Slam champion winning the 2024 US Open with Jeļena Ostapenko and the 2023 Wimbledon Championships with Mate Pavić becoming the first Ukrainian to do so.

Kichenok has won ten additional doubles titles on the WTA Tour, including four with her twin sister, Nadiia. On 21 July 2014, she reached her career-high singles rankings of 156.

== Career ==
=== 2015: WTA Tour doubles title, singles top 10 win ===
In 2015, she won her first WTA Tour doubles title together with her sister. They escaped a 5–0 deficit in the second set tie-break of their 6–4, 7–6 defeat of Liang Chen and Wang Yafan in the Shenzhen Open final. This win made the Kichenoks the second pair of twins, after Karolína Plíšková and Kristýna Plíšková, to win a tour doubles title. They previously had been runners-up at Tashkent in 2011, and Shenzhen in 2014. She won the second tour doubles title at the Brasil Tennis Cup.

During the Tianjin Open, Lyudmyla caused the biggest upset of the tournament with a top-10 win over Flavia Pennetta, world No. 8 and reigning US Open champion, in the first round; it has been the biggest win of her singles career so far.

=== 2022: WTA 1000 title, world No. 9 ===
At the Dubai Tennis Championships, she made the final in doubles, partnering Jeļena Ostapenko but they were defeated by second seeds Veronika Kudermetova and Elise Mertens.

At the French Open, she reached the semifinals of a major for the first time in her career, partnering again with Ostapenko, falling to the eventual champions, Caroline Garcia and Kristina Mladenovic. She reached the top 20 in doubles on 6 June 2022. The following week, she won her sixth title at Birmingham with Ostapenko. At the Wimbledon Championships, they also reached the semifinals, again falling to the eventual champions, this time Barbora Krejčíková and Kateřina Siniaková.

At the Cincinnati Open, she reached the final with Ostapenko defeating Australian Open finalists Haddad Maia and Anna Danilina and top seeds Kudermetova and Mertens. The pair won their biggest title defeating Nicole Melichar and Ellen Perez. Lyudmyla reached new career-highs in doubles of world No. 10, on 22 August 2022, and No. 9, on 12 September 2022.

At the inaugural edition of the Tallinn Open, seeded third with her sister, she won her eighth title defeating top-seeded pair Nicole Melichar and Laura Siegemund in the final.

She and Ostapenko qualified for the 2022 WTA Finals where they reached the semifinals.

=== 2023: Wimbledon mixed doubles champion ===
With Mate Pavić, she won the title at Wimbledon in mixed doubles.

She was selected to play in the 2023 WTA Elite Trophy with Ulrikke Eikeri as the defending champion, having won the trophy twice, the last time it was held in 2019, and also in 2018.

=== 2024: US Open title, world No. 3, Olympics quarterfinal ===
At the 2024 Australian Open, she reached her first doubles final with her usual partner Jeļena Ostapenko, defeating reigning US Open champions and fourth seeds, Gabriela Dabrowski and Erin Routliffe, in straight sets. Kichenok became the fourth Ukrainian female tennis player to reach a major doubles final, following sisters Kateryna Bondarenko and Alona Bondarenko who won the title at the 2008 Australian Open, and Elena Tatarkova who reached the final with Mariaan de Swardt of South Africa in the 1999 Wimbledon Championships.

With her sister, she reached the quarterfinals at the 2024 Paris Olympics.

At the US Open, seeded seventh in doubles, she reached another Grand Slam final with her partner Jelena Ostapenko, defeating Anna Danilina and Irina Khromacheva in the quarterfinal, and then Veronika Kudermetova and Chan Hao-ching in the semifinal, also in straight sets, 6–1, 6–2. Kichenok became the first Ukrainian tennis player to reach the semifinals in doubles at all four majors, and the first finalist at the US Open. Ostapenko and Kichenok defeated Kristina Mladenovic and Zhang Shuai in the final, in straight sets, to lift their first major trophy together, becoming the first Latvian and Ukrainian champions in women’s doubles. As a result, she reached a new career-high of world No. 3 in the doubles rankings, on 23 September 2024. Her and Ostapenko also surged to No.1 in the Race to the WTA Finals after the tournament.

Kichenok and Ostapenko qualified for the end-of-season WTA Finals in Riyadh, Saudi Arabia, as top seeds but were eliminated in the group stages after losing all three of their matches.

=== 2025: Two more career finals ===
Partnering with her sister Nadiia, she finished runner-up in the doubles draw of the Linz Open, losing to Tímea Babos and Luisa Stefani in the final which went to a deciding championship tiebreak.

She was also a finalist at the Bad Homburg Open, with Ellen Perez but lost to Alexandra Panova and Guo Hanyu in a deciding champions tiebreak.

== Performance timelines ==
Key
W	F	SF	QF	#R	RR	Q#	P#	DNQ	A	Z#	PO	G	S	B	NMS	NTI	P	NH

(W) winner; (F) finalist; (SF) semifinalist; (QF) quarterfinalist; (#R) rounds 4, 3, 2, 1; (RR) round-robin stage; (Q#) qualification round; (P#) preliminary round; (DNQ) did not qualify; (A) absent; (Z#) Davis/Fed Cup Zonal Group (with number indication) or (PO) play-off; (G) gold, (S) silver or (B) bronze Olympic/Paralympic medal; (NMS) not a Masters tournament; (NTI) not a Tier I tournament; (P) postponed; (NH) not held; (SR) strike rate (events won / competed); (W–L) win–loss record.
To avoid confusion and double counting, these charts are updated at the conclusion of a tournament or when the player's participation has ended.

Only main-draw results in WTA Tour, Grand Slam tournaments, Fed Cup/Billie Jean King Cup and Olympic Games are included in win–loss records.

=== Doubles ===
Tournament	2013	2014	2015	2016	2017	2018	2019	2020	2021	2022	2023	2024	2025	2026	SR	W–L	Win%
Grand Slam tournaments
Australian Open	A	A	1R	2R	1R	1R	A	1R	3R	2R	1R	F	3R	1R	0 / 11	11–11	50%
French Open	A	A	2R	2R	1R	1R	QF	1R	1R	SF	2R	2R	1R	1R	0 / 12	10–12	45%
Wimbledon	A	2R	3R	1R	3R	1R	2R	NH	A	SF	1R	QF	3R	2R	0 / 11	14–11	56%
US Open	A	A	2R	2R	3R	3R	QF	1R	1R	3R	2R	W	1R	2R	1 / 12	19–11	63%
Win–Loss	0–0	1–1	4–4	3–4	3–4	2–4	6–3	0–3	2–3	11–4	2–4	14–3	4–4	2–4	1 / 46	54–45	55%
Year-end championships
WTA Finals	DNQ							NH	DNQ	SF	DNQ	RR	DNQ		0 / 2	1–6	14%
WTA Elite Trophy	DNQ		RR	DNQ		W	W	NH			RR	NH			2 / 4	7–3	70%
National representation
Summer Olympics	NH			1R	NH				QF	NH		QF	NH		0 / 3	5–3	63%
WTA 1000 tournaments
Qatar Open	1R	A	A	1R	NTI	SF	NTI	2R	NTI	1R	NTI	1R	1R	1R	0 / 7	4–7	33%
Dubai Championships		A	A	NTI	1R	NTI	A	NTI	QF	NTI	SF	QF	QF	QF	0 / 6	10–6	63%
Indian Wells Open	A	A	A	A	A	1R	2R	NH	SF	1R	2R	QF	QF	2R	0 / 8	10–8	56%
Miami Open	A	A	A	1R	A	QF	2R	NH	QF	2R	QF	1R	2R	1R	0 / 9	8–9	47%
Madrid Open	A	A	A	A	A	1R	1R	NH	1R	SF	1R	QF	QF	1R	0 / 8	7–8	47%
Italian Open	A	A	A	1R	A	1R	1R	1R	1R	A	QF	QF	2R	1R	0/9	4–9	31%
Canadian Open	A	A	1R	A	QF	2R	1R	NH	1R	2R	QF	2R	2R	1R	0 / 10	8–10	44%
Cincinnati Open	A	A	A	1R	QF	1R	2R	1R	1R	W	2R	2R	SF	1R	1 / 11	12–10	55%
Guadalajara Open	NH									QF	2R	NH			0 / 2	3–2	60%
China Open	A	A	2R	A	2R	2R	1R	NH			1R	2R	2R	2R	0 / 8	6–8	43%
Wuhan Open	NH	A	2R	A	1R	2R	2R	NH				A	2R	A	0 / 5	4–5	44%
Career statistics
Year-end ranking	116	74	53	68	53	35	41	46	38	9	35	4	30		$3,537,050		

== Grand Slam tournament finals ==
=== Doubles: 2 (1 title, 1 runner-up) ===
Result	Year	Tournament	Surface	Partner	Opponents	Score
Loss	2024	Australian Open	Hard	(Latvia) Jeļena Ostapenko	(Chinese Taipei) Hsieh Su-wei (Belgium) Elise Mertens	1–6, 5–7
Win	2024	US Open	Hard	(Latvia) Jeļena Ostapenko	(France) Kristina Mladenovic (China) Zhang Shuai	6–4, 6–3

=== Mixed doubles: 1 (title) ===
Result	Year	Tournament	Surface	Partner	Opponents	Score
Win	2023	Wimbledon	Grass	(Croatia) Mate Pavić	(China) Xu Yifan (Belgium) Joran Vliegen	6–4, 6–7^{(9–11)}, 6–3

== Other significant finals ==
=== WTA 1000 tournaments ===
==== Doubles: 1 (title) ====
Result	Year	Tournament	Surface	Partner	Opponents	Score
Win	2022	Cincinnati Open	Hard	(Latvia) Jeļena Ostapenko	(United States) Nicole Melichar-Martinez (Australia) Ellen Perez	7–6^{(7–5)}, 6–3

=== WTA Elite Trophy ===
==== Doubles: 2 (2 titles) ====
Result	Year	Tournament	Surface	Partner	Opponents	Score
Win	2018	Zhuhai, China	Hard (i)	(Ukraine) Nadiia Kichenok	(Japan) Shuko Aoyama (Belarus) Lidziya Marozava	6–4, 3–6, [10–7]
Win	2019	Zhuhai, China (2)	Hard (i)	(Slovenia) Andreja Klepač	(China) Duan Yingying (China) Yang Zhaoxuan	6–3, 6–3

== WTA Tour finals ==
=== Doubles: 24 (11 titles, 13 runner-ups) ===
Legend Grand Slam (1–1) WTA Elite Trophy (2–0) WTA 1000 (1–0) Premier / WTA 500 (2–7) International / WTA 250 (5–5)	Finals by surface Hard (8–11) Clay (0–1) Grass (3–1)

Result	W–L	Date	Tournament	Tier	Surface	Partner	Opponents	Score
Loss	0–1	Sep 2011	Tashkent Open, Uzbekistan	International	Hard	(Ukraine) Nadiia Kichenok	(Greece) Eleni Daniilidou (Russia) Vitalia Diatchenko	4–6, 3–6
Loss	0–2	Jan 2014	Shenzhen Open, China	International	Hard	(Ukraine) Nadiia Kichenok	(Romania) Monica Niculescu (Czech Republic) Klára Zakopalová	3–6, 4–6
Win	1–2	Jan 2015	Shenzhen Open, China	International	Hard	(Ukraine) Nadiia Kichenok	(China) Liang Chen (China) Wang Yafan	6–4, 7–6^{(8–6)}
Win	2–2	Aug 2016	Brasil Tennis Cup, Brazil	International	Hard	(Ukraine) Nadiia Kichenok	(Hungary) Tímea Babos (Hungary) Réka Luca Jani	6–3, 6–1
Loss	2–3	Jan 2018	Hobart International, Australia	International	Hard	(Japan) Makoto Ninomiya	(Belgium) Elise Mertens (Netherlands) Demi Schuurs	2–6, 2–6
Loss	2–4	Jul 2018	Silicon Valley Classic, US	Premier	Hard	(Ukraine) Nadiia Kichenok	(Chinese Taipei) Latisha Chan (Czech Republic) Květa Peschke	4–6, 1–6
Win	3–4	Nov 2018	WTA Elite Trophy, China	Elite	Hard	(Ukraine) Nadiia Kichenok	(Japan) Shuko Aoyama (Belarus) Lidziya Marozava	6–4, 3–6, [10–7]
Win	4–4	Oct 2019	WTA Elite Trophy, China (2)	Elite	Hard	(Slovenia) Andreja Klepač	(China) Duan Yingying (China) Yang Zhaoxuan	6–3, 6–3
Win	5–4	Jun 2021	Nottingham Open, UK	WTA 250	Grass	(Japan) Makoto Ninomiya	(United States) Caroline Dolehide (Australia) Storm Sanders	6–4, 6–7^{(3–7)}, [10–8]
Loss	5–5	Aug 2021	Chicago Open, United States	WTA 250	Hard	(Japan) Makoto Ninomiya	(Ukraine) Nadiia Kichenok (Romania) Raluca Olaru	6–7^{(6–8)}, 7–5, [8–10]
Loss	5–6	Oct 2021	Tenerife Open, Spain	WTA 250	Hard	(Ukraine) Marta Kostyuk	(Norway) Ulrikke Eikeri (Australia) Ellen Perez	3–6, 3–6
Loss	5–7	Feb 2022	Dubai Championships, UAE	WTA 500	Hard	(Latvia) Jeļena Ostapenko	(Russia) Veronika Kudermetova (Belgium) Elise Mertens	1–6, 3–6
Win	6–7	Jun 2022	Birmingham Classic, UK	WTA 250	Grass	(Latvia) Jeļena Ostapenko	(Belgium) Elise Mertens (China) Zhang Shuai	w/o
Loss	6–8	Jun 2022	Eastbourne International, UK	WTA 500	Grass	(Latvia) Jeļena Ostapenko	(Serbia) Aleksandra Krunić (Poland) Magda Linette	w/o
Win	7–8	Aug 2022	Cincinnati Open, US	WTA 1000	Hard	(Latvia) Jeļena Ostapenko	(United States) Nicole Melichar-Martinez (Australia) Ellen Perez	7–6^{(7–5)}, 6–3
Win	8–8	Oct 2022	Tallinn Open, Estonia	WTA 250	Hard (i)	(Ukraine) Nadiia Kichenok	(United States) Nicole Melichar-Martinez (Germany) Laura Siegemund	7–5, 4–6, [10–7]
Loss	8–9	Feb 2023	Qatar Ladies Open, Qatar	WTA 500	Hard	(Latvia) Jeļena Ostapenko	(United States) Coco Gauff (United States) Jessica Pegula	4–6, 6–2, [7–10]
Win	9–9	Jan 2024	Brisbane International, Australia	WTA 500	Hard	(Latvia) Jeļena Ostapenko	(Belgium) Greet Minnen (United Kingdom) Heather Watson	7–5, 6–2
Loss	9–10	Jan 2024	Australian Open, Australia	Grand Slam	Hard	(Latvia) Jeļena Ostapenko	(Chinese Taipei) Hsieh Su-wei (Belgium) Elise Mertens	1–6, 5–7
Loss	9–11	Apr 2024	Charleston Open, US	WTA 500	Clay (green)	(Ukraine) Nadiia Kichenok	(United States) Ashlyn Krueger (United States) Sloane Stephens	6–1, 3–6, [7–10]
Win	10–11	Jun 2024	Eastbourne International, UK	WTA 500	Grass	(Latvia) Jeļena Ostapenko	(Canada) Gabriela Dabrowski (New Zealand) Erin Routliffe	5–7, 7–6^{(7–2)}, [10–8]
Win	11–11	Sep 2024	US Open, United States	Grand Slam	Hard	(Latvia) Jeļena Ostapenko	(France) Kristina Mladenovic (China) Zhang Shuai	6–4, 6–3
Loss	11–12	Feb 2025	Linz Open, Austria	WTA 500	Hard	(Ukraine) Nadiia Kichenok	(Hungary) Tímea Babos (Brazil) Luisa Stefani	6–3, 5–7, [4–10]
Loss	11–13	Jan 2026	Adelaide International, Australia	WTA 500	Hard	(United States) Desirae Krawczyk	(Czech Republic) Kateřina Siniaková (China) Zhang Shuai	1–6, 4–6

== WTA 125 finals ==
=== Doubles: 1 (runner-up) ===
Result	Date	Tournament	Surface	Partner	Opponents	Score
Loss	May 2026	Clarins Open, France	Clay	(United States) Desirae Krawczyk	(Japan) Shuko Aoyama (Chinese Taipei) Liang En-shuo	6–7^{(5–7)}, 2–6

== ITF Circuit finals ==
=== Singles: 12 (6 titles, 6 runner-ups) ===
Legend $60,000 tournaments (1–2) $25,000 tournaments (3–4) $10,000 tournaments (2–0)	Finals by surface Hard (4–3) Clay (1–0) Carpet (1–3)

Result	W–L	Date	Tournament	Tier	Surface	Opponent	Score
Win	1–0	Oct 2009	ITF Kharkiv, Ukraine	10,000	Carpet (i)	(Ukraine) Nadiia Kichenok	6–7^{(2)}, 6–3, 6–2
Win	2–0	Nov 2009	ITF Stockholm, Sweden	10,000	Hard (i)	(Russia) Marta Sirotkina	6–3, 6–3
Loss	2–1	Nov 2009	ITF Minsk, Belarus	50,000	Hard (i)	(Russia) Anna Lapushchenkova	7–5, 6–7^{(3)}, 2–6
Loss	2–2	Apr 2010	ITF Khanty-Mansiysk, Russia	50,000	Carpet (i)	(Russia) Anna Lapushchenkova	2–6, 2–6
Win	3–2	May 2010	ITF Kharkiv, Ukraine	25,000	Clay	(Ukraine) Elina Svitolina	6–2, 4–6, 6–1
Win	4–2	Mar 2011	ITF Moscow, Russia	25,000	Hard (i)	(Russia) Daria Gavrilova	6–2, 6–0
Loss	4–3	Mar 2012	ITF Moscow, Russia	25,000	Hard (i)	(Russia) Margarita Gasparyan	0–6, ret.
Win	5–3	May 2012	ITF Astana, Kazakhstan	25,000	Hard	(United Kingdom) Lisa Whybourn	4–6, 6–4, 6–2
Loss	5–4	Jun 2012	ITF Bukhara, Uzbekistan	25,000	Hard	(Kazakhstan) Zarina Diyas	0–6, 0–6
Loss	5–5	Nov 2012	ITF Minsk, Belarus	25,000	Hard (i)	(Belarus) Aliaksandra Sasnovich	0–6, 6–7^{(4)}
Loss	5–6	Jul 2013	ITF Imola, Italy	25,000	Carpet	(Russia) Victoria Kan	6–3, 5–7, 2–6
Win	6–6	Aug 2013	Kazan Open, Russia	50,000	Hard	(Ukraine) Valentyna Ivakhnenko	6–2, 2–6, 6–2

=== Doubles: 51 (28 titles, 23 runner-ups) ===
Legend $100,000 tournaments (1–2) $75,000 tournaments (0–2) $50/60,000 tournaments (9–4) $25,000 tournaments (16–12) $10,000 tournaments (2–3)	Finals by surface Hard (19–11) Clay (3–9) Grass (1–1) Carpet (5–2)

Result	W–L	Date	Tournament	Tier	Surface	Partnering	Opponents	Score
Loss	1.	1 October 2006	Royal Cup, Montenegro	25,000	Clay	(Ukraine) Nadiia Kichenok	(Croatia) Josipa Bek (Serbia) Karolina Jovanović	4–6, 7–5, 2–6
Loss	2.	25 May 2007	ITF Cherkassy, Ukraine	10,000	Clay	(Ukraine) Nadiia Kichenok	(Ukraine) Katerina Avdiyenko (Ukraine) Anna Zaporozhanova	6–7^{(3)}, 2–6
Loss	3.	3 August 2008	ITF Dnipropetrovsk, Ukraine	50,000	Clay	(Ukraine) Nadiia Kichenok	(Russia) Vasilisa Davydova (Russia) Maria Kondratieva	3–6, 1–6
Loss	4.	29 August 2008	ITF Bucharest, Romania	10,000	Clay	(Ukraine) Nadiia Kichenok	(Romania) Laura Ioana Andrei (Romania) Irina-Camelia Begu	2–6, 6–3, [6–10]
Loss	5.	29 March 2009	ITF Moscow, Russia	25,000	Hard (i)	(Ukraine) Nadiia Kichenok	(Russia) Vitalia Diatchenko (Belarus) Ekaterina Dzehalevich	1–6, 1–6
Loss	6.	22 May 2009	ITF Kharkiv, Ukraine	25,000	Clay	(Ukraine) Nadiia Kichenok	(Belarus) Ksenia Milevskaya (Ukraine) Lesia Tsurenko	4–6, 4–6
Win	1.	13 September 2009	ITF Alphen aan den Rijn, Netherlands	25,000	Clay	(Ukraine) Nadiia Kichenok	(Netherlands) Chayenne Ewijk (Netherlands) Marlot Meddens	6–2, 4–6, [10–8]
Win	2.	16 October 2009	ITF Kharkiv, Ukraine	10,000	Carpet (i)	(Ukraine) Nadiia Kichenok	(Ukraine) Veronika Kapshay (Latvia) Irina Kuzmina	2–6, 6–2, [10–3]
Win	3.	1 November 2009	ITF Stockholm, Sweden	10,000	Hard (i)	(Ukraine) Nadiia Kichenok	(Russia) Alexandra Artamonova (Belarus) Lidziya Marozava	6–3, 6–1
Win	4.	14 November 2009	ITF Minsk, Belarus	50,000	Hard (i)	(Ukraine) Nadiia Kichenok	(Serbia) Vesna Dolonc (Russia) Evgeniya Rodina	6–3, 7–6^{(7)}
Loss	7.	22 November 2009	ITF Opole, Poland	25,000	Carpet (i)	(Ukraine) Nadiia Kichenok	(Serbia) Ana Jovanović (Germany) Justine Ozga	4–6, 4–6
Loss	8.	7 February 2010	ITF Rancho Mirage, United States	25,000	Hard	(Ukraine) Nadiia Kichenok	(Australia) Monique Adamczak (United States) Abigail Spears	3–6, 4–6
Loss	9.	28 March 2010	ITF Moscow, Russia	25,000	Hard (i)	(Ukraine) Nadiia Kichenok	(Russia) Nina Bratchikova (France) Irena Pavlovic	7–6^{(4)}, 2–6, [3–10]
Loss	10.	3 April 2010	ITF Khanty-Mansiysk, Russia	50,000	Carpet (i)	(Ukraine) Nadiia Kichenok	(Russia) Alexandra Panova (Russia) Ksenia Pervak	6–7^{(7)}, 6–2, [7–10]
Win	5.	8 May 2010	ITF Kharkiv, Ukraine	25,000	Hard	(Ukraine) Nadiia Kichenok	(Ukraine) Kateryna Kozlova (Ukraine) Elina Svitolina	6–4, 6–2
Loss	11.	21 May 2010	ITF Kharkiv, Ukraine	25,000	Clay	(Ukraine) Nadiia Kichenok	(Ukraine) Katerina Avdiyenko (Belarus) Ksenia Milevskaya	4–6, 2–6
Loss	12.	20 June 2010	Open de Montpellier, France	25,000	Clay	(France) Amandine Hesse	(China) Lu Jingjing (Germany) Laura Siegemund	4–6, 2–6
Loss	13.	27 June 2010	ITF Périgueux, France	25,000	Clay	(Ukraine) Nadiia Kichenok	(Netherlands) Elise Tamaëla (Germany) Scarlett Werner	2–6, 1–6
Win	6.	10 October 2010	Open de Limoges, France	25,000	Hard (i)	(Ukraine) Nadiia Kichenok	(France) Claire Feuerstein (France) Caroline Garcia	6–7^{(5)}, 6–4, [10–8]
Win	7.	26 March 2011	ITF Moscow, Russia	25,000	Hard (i)	(Ukraine) Nadiia Kichenok	(Russia) Alexandra Panova (Russia) Olga Panova	6–3, 6–3
Win	8.	30 April 2011	ITF Minsk, Belarus	25,000	Hard (i)	(Ukraine) Nadiia Kichenok	(Serbia) Teodora Mirčić (Austria) Nicole Rottmann	6–1, 6–2
Loss	14.	5 June 2011	Přerov Cup, Czech Republic	25,000	Clay	(Ukraine) Nadiia Kichenok	(Czech Republic) Kateřina Kramperová (Czech Republic) Karolína Plíšková	3–6, 4–6
Win	9.	16 October 2011	Open de Touraine, France	50,000	Hard (i)	(Ukraine) Nadiia Kichenok	(Greece) Eirini Georgatou (France) Irena Pavlovic	6–2, 6–0
Win	10.	6 November 2011	ITF Istanbul, Turkey	25,000	Hard (i)	(Ukraine) Nadiia Kichenok	(Bosnia and Herzegovina) Mervana Jugić-Salkić (Croatia) Ana Vrljić	4–6, 6–1, [10–7]
Loss	15.	22 January 2012	ITF Stuttgart, Germany	10,000	Hard (i)	(Ukraine) Nadiia Kichenok	(Poland) Paula Kania (Russia) Ksenia Lykina	3–6, 4–6
Win	11.	20 May 2012	Fergana Challenger, Uzbekistan	25,000	Hard	(Ukraine) Nadiia Kichenok	(Uzbekistan) Albina Khabibulina (Ukraine) Anastasiya Vasylyeva	6–4, 6–1
Win	12.	16 June 2012	ITF Bukhara, Uzbekistan	25,000	Hard	(Ukraine) Nadiia Kichenok	(Ukraine) Valentyna Ivakhnenko (Ukraine) Kateryna Kozlova	7–5, 7–5
Win	13.	21 July 2012	ITF Donetsk, Ukraine	50,000	Hard	(Ukraine) Nadiia Kichenok	(Ukraine) Valentyna Ivakhnenko (Ukraine) Kateryna Kozlova	6–2, 7–5
Loss	16.	28 July 2012	President's Cup, Kazakhstan	100,000	Hard	(Ukraine) Nadiia Kichenok	(Georgia (country)) Oksana Kalashnikova (Russia) Marta Sirotkina	6–3, 4–6, [2–10]
Loss	17.	18 August 2012	Kazan Open, Russia	50,000	Hard	(Ukraine) Nadiia Kichenok	(Ukraine) Valentyna Ivakhnenko (Ukraine) Kateryna Kozlova	4–6, 7–6^{(6)}, [4–10]
Win	14.	3 November 2012	ITF Netanya, Israel	25,000	Hard	(Ukraine) Nadiia Kichenok	(Slovakia) Zuzana Luknárová (Slovakia) Anna Karolína Schmiedlová	6–1, 6–4
Loss	18.	10 November 2012	ITF Minsk, Belarus	25,000	Hard (i)	(Ukraine) Nadiia Kichenok	(Belarus) Ekaterina Dzehalevich (Belarus) Aliaksandra Sasnovich	6–1, 2–6, [3–10]
Win	15.	18 November 2012	ITF Helsinki, Finland	25,000	Carpet (i)	(Ukraine) Nadiia Kichenok	(Ukraine) Irina Buryachok (Russia) Valeria Solovyeva	6–3, 6–3
Loss	19.	30 March 2013	ITF Tallinn, Estonia	25,000	Hard (i)	(Ukraine) Nadiia Kichenok	(Estonia) Anett Kontaveit (Latvia) Jeļena Ostapenko	6–2, 5–7, [0–10]
Win	16.	13 July 2013	ITF Istanbul, Turkey	25,000	Hard	(Georgia (country)) Oksana Kalashnikova	(Ukraine) Alona Fomina (Slovenia) Anja Prislan	6–2, 4–6, [10–7]
Win	17.	20 July 2013	ITF Imola, Italy	25,000	Carpet	(Latvia) Jeļena Ostapenko	(Philippines) Katharina Lehnert (Italy) Alice Matteucci	6–4, 3–6, [10–3]
Win	18.	27 July 2013	President's Cup, Kazakhstan	100,000	Hard	(Ukraine) Nadiia Kichenok	(Russia) Nina Bratchikova (Russia) Valeria Solovyeva	6–2, 6–2
Win	19.	28 September 2013	Fergana Challenger, Uzbekistan	25,000	Hard	(Belarus) Polina Pekhova	(Slovakia) Michaela Hončová (Ukraine) Veronika Kapshay	6–4, 6–2
Win	20.	9 November 2013	ITF Astana, Kazakhstan	25,000	Hard	(Ukraine) Nadiia Kichenok	(Russia) Alexandra Artamonova (Russia) Eugeniya Pashkova	6–1, 6–1
Loss	20.	15 November 2013	Dubai Tennis Challenge, UAE	75,000	Hard	(Ukraine) Nadiia Kichenok	(Ukraine) Olga Savchuk (Russia) Vitalia Diatchenko	5–7, 1–6
Win	21.	7 March 2014	ITF Campinas, Brazil	25,000	Clay	(Russia) Alexandra Panova	(France) Laura Thorpe (Liechtenstein) Stephanie Vogt	6–1, 6–3
Win	22.	29 March 2014	Open Croissy-Beaubourg, France	50,000	Hard (i)	(Russia) Margarita Gasparyan	(Germany) Kristina Barrois (Greece) Eleni Daniilidou	6–2, 6–4
Win	23.	1 November 2014	Open Nantes Atlantique, France	50,000	Hard (i)	(Ukraine) Nadiia Kichenok	(France) Stéphanie Foretz (France) Amandine Hesse	6–2, 6–3
Loss	21.	15 November 2014	Dubai Tennis Challenge, UAE	75,000	Hard	(Ukraine) Olga Savchuk	(Russia) Alexandra Panova (Russia) Vitalia Diatchenko	6–3, 2–6, [4–10]
Win	24.	21 February 2015	ITF Kreuzlingen, Switzerland	50,000	Carpet (i)	(Ukraine) Nadiia Kichenok	(France) Stéphanie Foretz (France) Irina Ramialison	6–3, 6–3
Win	25.	25 April 2015	ITF İstanbul, Turkey	50,000	Hard	(Ukraine) Nadiia Kichenok	(Russia) Valentyna Ivakhnenko (Russia) Polina Monova	6–4, 6–3
Win	26.	14 June 2015	Surbiton Trophy, UK	50,000	Grass	(Switzerland) Xenia Knoll	(United Kingdom) Tara Moore (United Kingdom) Nicola Slater	7–6^{(6)}, 6–3
Win	27.	19 March 2016	ITF Irapuato, Mexico	25,000	Hard	(Ukraine) Nadiia Kichenok	(Japan) Akiko Omae (India) Prarthana Thombare	6–1, 6–4
Loss	22.	11 March 2017	Zhuhai Open, China	60,000	Hard	(Ukraine) Nadiia Kichenok	(Netherlands) Lesley Kerkhove (Belarus) Lidziya Marozava	4–6, 2–6
Win	28.	18 March 2017	Pingshan Open, China	60,000	Hard	(Ukraine) Nadiia Kichenok	(Japan) Eri Hozumi (Russia) Valeria Savinykh	6–4, 6–4
Loss	23.	30 June 2017	Southsea Trophy, UK	100,000	Grass	(Switzerland) Viktorija Golubic	(Japan) Shuko Aoyama (China) Yang Zhaoxuan	7–6^{(7)}, 3–6, [8–10]

== Wins against top 10 players ==
#	Player	Rank	Event	Surface	Rd	Score	LKR	
1	(Italy) Flavia Pennetta	8	Tianjin Open, China	Hard	1R	6–3, 7–5	414	2015
