= Nicole Melichar-Martinez =

American tennis player (born 1993)

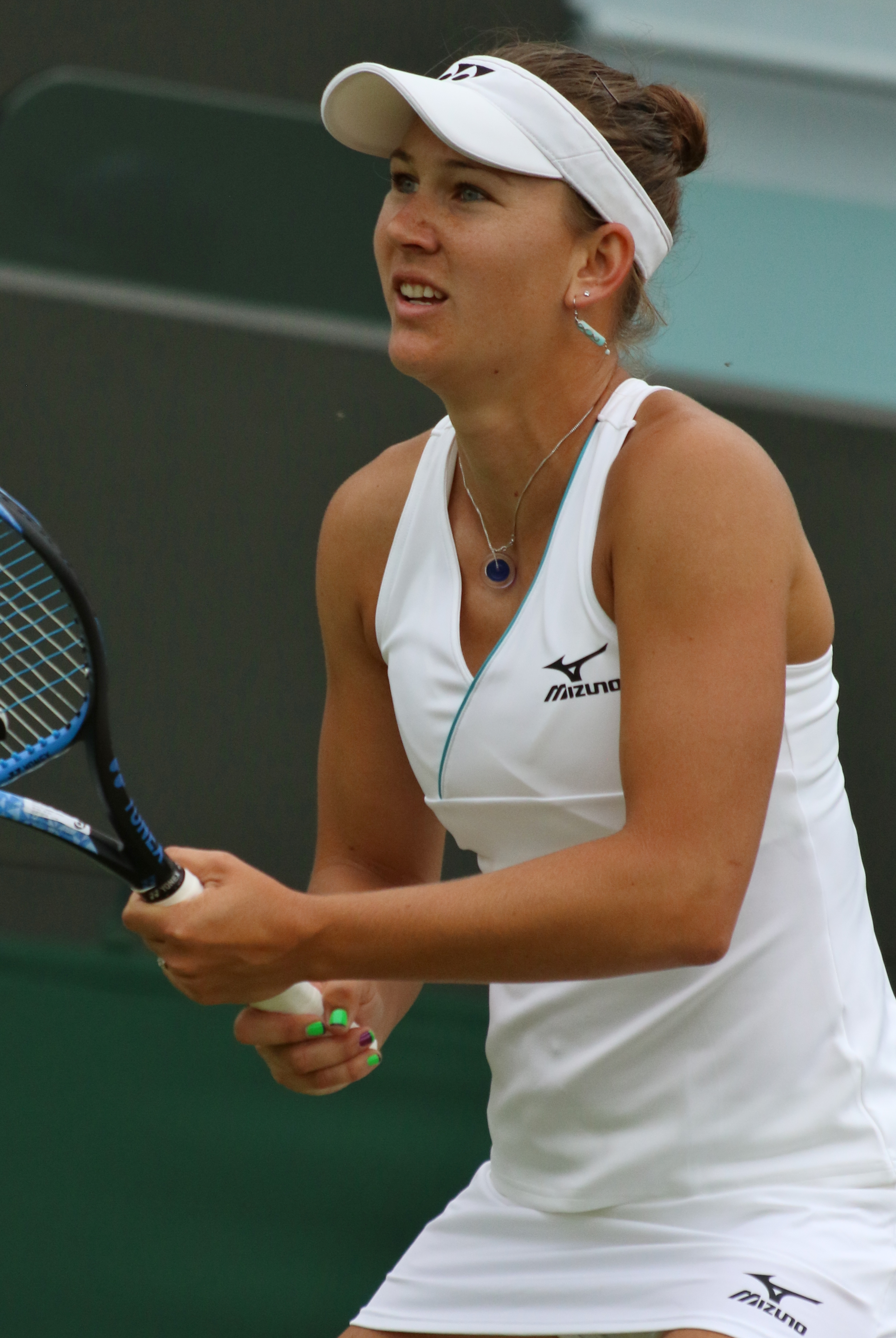
- Melichar at the 2019 Wimbledon
- Native name: Nicole Melicharová
- Country (sports): United States
- Residence: Stuart, Florida, US
- Born: July 29, 1993 (age 33) Brno, Czech Republic
- Height: 1.81 m (5 ft 11 in)
- Plays: Right (two-handed backhand)
- Coach: Carlos Martinez
- Prize money: $4,265,958

Singles
- Career record: 140–142
- Career titles: 0 WTA, 2 ITF
- Highest ranking: No. 400 (September 24, 2012)

Doubles
- Career record: 493–376
- Career titles: 20
- Highest ranking: No. 6 (July 3, 2023)
- Current ranking: No. 9 (September 14, 2026)

Grand Slam doubles results
- Australian Open: SF (2021)
- French Open: SF (2020, 2023)
- Wimbledon: F (2018)
- US Open: F (2020)

Other doubles tournaments
- Tour Finals: F (2023)

Grand Slam mixed doubles results
- Australian Open: SF (2019)
- French Open: SF (2019, 2022)
- Wimbledon: W (2018)
- US Open: QF (2018)
- Last updated on: 25 September 2026.

Nicole Melichar-Martinez (Spanish: Martínez; née Melichar; born Nicole Melicharová pronounced [ˈmɛlɪxarovaː] on July 29, 1993) is an American professional tennis player who specializes in doubles. On 3 July 2023, she peaked at No. 6 in the WTA rankings. Melichar won a major title in mixed doubles at the 2018 Wimbledon Championships with Austrian partner Alexander Peya. She has also won 20 WTA Tour doubles titles as well as two titles on the WTA Challenger Tour.

In singles, she has reached a career-high ranking of No. 400 in 2012 and has won two ITF titles.

== Personal life and background ==
Melichar was born in the Czech Republic, and has lived in the U.S. since shortly after her birth. Her older sister Jane played tennis, and Melichar claims to have taken up the sport when she was just one year old.

She is married to her tennis coach, Carlos Martinez.

== Career highlights ==
Melichar is a two-time Grand Slam tournament finalist in women's doubles, finishing runner-up at the 2018 Wimbledon Championships with Květa Peschke and the 2020 US Open with Xu Yifan.

Melichar made her Fed Cup debut for the U.S. team in 2019, partnering Danielle Collins, losing their match against Australian pair of Ashleigh Barty and Priscilla Hon.

She also reached four WTA 1000 finals, at the Cincinnati Open in 2020 with Xu Yifan, and in 2022 and 2023 with Ellen Perez, and at the 2022 Canadian Open also with Perez.

Melichar-Martinez qualified for the third time at the WTA Finals in 2023, partnering Ellen Perez and reached the semifinals for the second time, having made it to that level also in 2021 with a different partner, Dutch player Demi Schuurs. Next the pair Melichar/Perez reached the final, a first time at this level for both players. They lost to Laura Siegemund and Vera Zvonareva in the championship match.

At the 2024 Dubai Championships, she reached her fifth WTA 1000 final with Perez, before losing to fourth seeds Storm Hunter and Kateřina Siniaková. As top seeds, they won the 2024 Bad Homburg Open, defeating Chan Hao-ching and Veronika Kudermetova in the final.

Melichar-Martinez and Perez qualified for the 2024 WTA Finals and reached the semifinals after compiling a record of two wins and one loss in the group stages. They lost in the last four to second seeds Gabriela Dabrowski and Erin Routliffe, in straight sets.

== Performance timelines ==
Key
W	F	SF	QF	#R	RR	Q#	P#	DNQ	A	Z#	PO	G	S	B	NMS	NTI	P	NH

(W) winner; (F) finalist; (SF) semifinalist; (QF) quarterfinalist; (#R) rounds 4, 3, 2, 1; (RR) round-robin stage; (Q#) qualification round; (P#) preliminary round; (DNQ) did not qualify; (A) absent; (Z#) Davis/Fed Cup Zonal Group (with number indication) or (PO) play-off; (G) gold, (S) silver or (B) bronze Olympic/Paralympic medal; (NMS) not a Masters tournament; (NTI) not a Tier I tournament; (P) postponed; (NH) not held; (SR) strike rate (events won / competed); (W–L) win–loss record.
To avoid confusion and double counting, these charts are updated at the conclusion of a tournament or when the player's participation has ended.

Only main-draw results in WTA Tour, Grand Slam tournaments, Billie Jean King Cup, United Cup, Hopman Cup and Olympic Games are included in win–loss records.

=== Doubles ===
Current through the 2023 US Open.

Tournament	2013	2014	2015	2016	2017	2018	2019	2020	2021	2022	2023	2024	2025	2026	SR	W–L	Win%
Grand Slam tournaments
Australian Open	A	A	A	1R	A	3R	3R	1R	SF	3R	2R	1R	3R	3R	0 / 10	15–10	60%
French Open	A	A	A	1R	1R	3R	QF	SF	3R	1R	SF	3R	2R	3R	0 / 11	20–11	65%
Wimbledon	A	A	1R	1R	1R	F	QF	NH	1R	QF	1R	2R	3R	1R	0 / 11	15–11	58%
US Open	A	A	A	2R	1R	1R	2R	F	1R	SF	2R	QF	3R	QF	0 / 11	19–11	63%
Win–loss	0–0	0–0	0–1	1–4	0–3	9–4	9–4	9–3	6–4	9–4	6–4	6–4	7–4	7–4	0 / 43	69–43	62%
Year-end championships
WTA Finals	Did Not Qualify					QF	Alt	NH	SF	Alt	F	SF	DNQ		0 / 4	7–6	54%
WTA 1000 tournaments
Qatar Open	A	A	NTI	1R	NTI	1R	NTI	QF	NTI	2R	NTI	2R	1R	QF	0 / 7	5–7	44%
Dubai Championships	Not Tier I		A	NTI	A	NTI	2R	NTI	QF	NTI	1R	F	1R	2R	0 / 6	5–6	44%
Indian Wells Open	A	A	A	A	A	2R	1R	NH	2R	A	2R	SF	QF	SF	0 / 7	11–7	61%
Miami Open	A	A	1R	1R	1R	1R	1R	NH	1R	A	SF	2R	1R	A	0 / 9	4–9	31%
Madrid Open	A	A	A	A	A	2R	2R	NH	1R	2R	1R	1R	1R	2R	0 / 8	3–8	27%
Italian Open	A	A	A	A	A	1R	2R	2R	2R	2R	2R	1R	2R	F	0 / 9	6–9	40%
Canadian Open	A	A	A	1R	QF	SF	QF	NH	2R	F	QF	A	1R	F	0 / 9	15–9	63%
Cincinnati Open	A	A	A	1R	A	2R	2R	F	QF	F	F	A	QF	1R	0 / 9	16–9	64%
China Open	A	A	A	A	1R	QF	QF	Not Held			QF	1R	2R	2R	0 / 7	8–7	53%
Wuhan Open	A	A	2R	A	2R	QF	QF	Not Held				QF	1R	SF	0 / 7	8–7	53%
Guadalajara Open	Not Held									2R	1R	Not Tier I			0 / 2	1–2	33%
Career statistics
Tournaments	2	11	23	22	27	25	27	10	22	20	28				Career total: 217		
Titles	0	0	0	0	1	2	3	2	2	2	0				Career total: 12		
Finals	0	0	1	0	4	4	5	4	4	5	5				Career total: 33		
Overall win–loss	1–2	6–11	15–23	7–22	27–26	36–22	36–25	24–8	33–21	38–18	33–28				11 / 192	254–206	55%
Year-end ranking	184	124	69	88	39	15	20	11	12	19	15	12	18		$1,953,547		

=== Mixed doubles ===
Tournament	2012	...	2016	2017	2018	2019	2020	2021	2022	2023	2024	SR	W–L
Australian Open	A		A	A	1R	SF	2R	2R (Note: Melichar and her doubles partner Robert Farah withdrew from tournament before the second-round match against Arina Rodionova and Max Purcell; not counted as loss.)	1R	1R	QF	0 / 7	7–6
French Open	A		A	A	QF	SF	NH	2R	SF	1R	2R	0 / 6	10–6
Wimbledon	A		1R	QF	W	QF	NH	QF	1R	1R	A	1 / 7	11–6
US Open	1R		A	1R	QF	2R	NH	2R	2R	1R	1R	0 / 8	5–8
Win–loss	0–1		0–1	2–2	9–3	9–4	1–1	5–3	4–4	0–4	3–3	1 / 28	33–26

== Grand Slam tournament finals ==
=== Doubles: 2 (2 runner-ups) ===
Result	Year	Tournament	Surface	Partner	Opponents	Score
Loss	2018	Wimbledon	Grass	(Czech Republic) Květa Peschke	(Czech Republic) Barbora Krejčíková (Czech Republic) Kateřina Siniaková	4–6, 6–4, 0–6
Loss	2020	US Open	Hard	(China) Xu Yifan	(Germany) Laura Siegemund (Russia) Vera Zvonareva	4–6, 4–6

=== Mixed: 1 (title) ===
Result	Year	Tournament	Surface	Partner	Opponents	Score
Win	2018	Wimbledon	Grass	(Austria) Alexander Peya	(Belarus) Victoria Azarenka (United Kingdom) Jamie Murray	7–6^{(7–1)}, 6–3

== Other significant finals ==
=== Year-end championships ===
==== Doubles: 1 (runner-up) ====
Result	Year	Tournament	Surface	Partner	Opponents	Score
Loss	2023	WTA Finals, Cancún	Hard	(Australia) Ellen Perez	(Germany) Laura Siegemund; Vera Zvonareva	4–6, 4–6

=== WTA 1000 tournaments ===
==== Doubles: 6 (6 runner-ups) ====
Result	Year	Tournament	Surface	Partner	Opponents	Score
Loss	2020	Cincinnati Open	Hard	(China) Xu Yifan	(Czech Republic) Květa Peschke (Netherlands) Demi Schuurs	1–6, 6–4, [4–10]
Loss	2022	Canadian Open	Hard	(Australia) Ellen Perez	(United States) Coco Gauff (United States) Jessica Pegula	4–6, 7–6^{(7–5)}, [5–10]
Loss	2022	Cincinnati Open	Hard	(Australia) Ellen Perez	(Ukraine) Lyudmyla Kichenok (Latvia) Jeļena Ostapenko	6–7^{(5–7)}, 3–6
Loss	2023	Cincinnati Open	Hard	(Australia) Ellen Perez	(United States) Alycia Parks (United States) Taylor Townsend	7–6^{(7–1)}, 4–6, [6–10]
Loss	2024	Dubai Open	Hard	(Australia) Ellen Perez	(Australia) Storm Hunter (Czech Republic) Kateřina Siniaková	4–6, 2–6
Loss	2026	Italian Open	Clay	(Spain) Cristina Bucșa	Mirra Andreeva; Diana Shnaider	3–6, 3–6

== WTA Tour finals ==
=== Doubles: 51 (20 titles, 31 runner-ups) ===
Legend Grand Slam (0–2) WTA Finals (0–1) WTA 1000 (0–7) Premier / WTA 500 (14–12) International / WTA 250 (6–9)	Finals by surface Hard (13–18) Clay (6–7) Grass (1–6)

Result	W–L	Date	Tournament	Tier	Surface	Partner	Opponents	Score
Loss	0–1	Oct 2015	Tianjin Open, China	International	Hard	(Croatia) Darija Jurak	(China) Xu Yifan (China) Zheng Saisai	2–6, 6–3, [8–10]
Loss	0–2	Mar 2017	Malaysian Open, Malaysia	International	Hard	(Japan) Makoto Ninomiya	(Australia) Ashleigh Barty (Australia) Casey Dellacqua	6–7^{(5–7)}, 3–6
Loss	0–3	Apr 2017	İstanbul Cup, Turkey	International	Clay	(Belgium) Elise Mertens	(Slovenia) Dalila Jakupović (Ukraine) Nadiia Kichenok	6–7^{(6–8)}, 2–6
Win	1–3	May 2017	Nuremberg Cup, Germany	International	Clay	(United Kingdom) Anna Smith	(Belgium) Kirsten Flipkens (Sweden) Johanna Larsson	3–6, 6–3, [11–9]
Loss	1–4	Oct 2017	Kremlin Cup, Russia	Premier	Hard (i)	(United Kingdom) Anna Smith	(Hungary) Tímea Babos (Czech Republic) Andrea Hlaváčková	2–6, 6–3, [3–10]
Loss	1–5	Apr 2018	Stuttgart Grand Prix, Germany	Premier	Clay (i)	(Czech Republic) Květa Peschke	(United States) Raquel Atawo (Germany) Anna-Lena Grönefeld	4–6, 7–6^{(7–5)}, [5–10]
Win	2–5	May 2018	Prague Open, Czech Republic	International	Clay	(Czech Republic) Květa Peschke	(Romania) Mihaela Buzărnescu (Belarus) Lidziya Marozava	6–4, 6–2
Loss	2–6	Jul 2018	Wimbledon, UK	Grand Slam	Grass	(Czech Republic) Květa Peschke	(Czech Republic) Barbora Krejčíková (Czech Republic) Kateřina Siniaková	4–6, 6–4, 0–6
Win	3–6	Oct 2018	Tianjin Open, China	International	Hard	(Czech Republic) Květa Peschke	(Australia) Monique Adamczak (Australia) Jessica Moore	6–4, 6–2
Win	4–6	Jan 2019	Brisbane International, Australia	Premier	Hard	(Czech Republic) Květa Peschke	(Chinese Taipei) Chan Hao-ching (Chinese Taipei) Latisha Chan	6–1, 6–1
Loss	4–7	May 2019	Prague Open, Czech Republic	International	Clay	(Czech Republic) Květa Peschke	(Russia) Anna Kalinskaya (Slovakia) Viktória Kužmová	6–4, 5–7, [7–10]
Loss	4–8	May 2019	Nuremberg Cup, Germany	International	Clay	(Canada) Sharon Fichman	(Canada) Gabriela Dabrowski (China) Xu Yifan	6–4, 6–7^{(5–7)}, [5–10]
Win	5–8	Aug 2019	Silicon Valley Classic, US	Premier	Hard	(Czech Republic) Květa Peschke	(Japan) Shuko Aoyama (Japan) Ena Shibahara	6–4, 6–4
Win	6–8	Sep 2019	Zhengzhou Open, China	Premier	Hard	(Czech Republic) Květa Peschke	(Belgium) Yanina Wickmayer (Slovenia) Tamara Zidanšek	6–1, 7–6^{(7–2)}
Win	7–8	Jan 2020	Adelaide International, Australia	Premier	Hard	(China) Xu Yifan	(Canada) Gabriela Dabrowski (Croatia) Darija Jurak	2–6, 7–5, [10–5]
Loss	7–9	Aug 2020	Cincinnati Open, US	Premier 5 (Note: The Premier 5 & Mandatory tournaments were reclassified as WTA 1000 tournaments in 2021.)	Hard	(China) Xu Yifan	(Czech Republic) Květa Peschke (Netherlands) Demi Schuurs	1–6, 6–4, [4–10]
Loss	7–10	Sep 2020	US Open, US	Grand Slam	Hard	(China) Xu Yifan	(Germany) Laura Siegemund (Russia) Vera Zvonareva	4–6, 4–6
Win	8–10	Sep 2020	Internationaux de Strasbourg, France	International	Clay	(Netherlands) Demi Schuurs	(United States) Hayley Carter (Brazil) Luisa Stefani	6–4, 6–3
Win	9–10	Mar 2021	Qatar Ladies Open	WTA 500	Hard	(Netherlands) Demi Schuurs	(Romania) Monica Niculescu (Latvia) Jeļena Ostapenko	6–2, 2–6, [10–8]
Win	10–10	Apr 2021	Charleston Open, US	WTA 500	Clay (green)	(Netherlands) Demi Schuurs	(Czech Republic) Marie Bouzková (Czech Republic) Lucie Hradecká	6–2, 6–4
Loss	10–11	Jun 2021	Berlin Open, Germany	WTA 500	Grass	(Netherlands) Demi Schuurs	(Belarus) Victoria Azarenka (Belarus) Aryna Sabalenka	6–4, 5–7, [4–10]
Loss	10–12	Jun 2021	Eastbourne International, UK	WTA 500	Grass	(Netherlands) Demi Schuurs	(Japan) Shuko Aoyama (Japan) Ena Shibahara	1–6, 4–6
Win	11–12	May 2022	Internationaux de Strasbourg, France (2)	WTA 250	Clay	(Australia) Daria Saville	(Czech Republic) Lucie Hradecká (India) Sania Mirza	5–7, 7–5, [10–6]
Loss	11–13	Aug 2022	Canadian Open, Canada	WTA 1000	Hard	(Australia) Ellen Perez	(United States) Coco Gauff (United States) Jessica Pegula	4–6, 7–6^{(7–5)}, [5–10]
Loss	11–14	Aug 2022	Cincinnati Open, US	WTA 1000	Hard	(Australia) Ellen Perez	(Ukraine) Lyudmyla Kichenok (Latvia) Jeļena Ostapenko	6–7^{(5–7)}, 3–6
Win	12–14	Aug 2022	Tennis in Cleveland, US	WTA 250	Hard	(Australia) Ellen Perez	(Kazakhstan) Anna Danilina (Serbia) Aleksandra Krunić	7–5, 6–3
Loss	12–15	Sep 2022	Pan Pacific Open, Japan	WTA 500	Hard	(Australia) Ellen Perez	(Canada) Gabriela Dabrowski (Mexico) Giuliana Olmos	4–6, 4–6
Loss	12–16	Oct 2022	Tallinn Open, Estonia	WTA 250	Hard (i)	(Germany) Laura Siegemund	(Ukraine) Lyudmyla Kichenok (Ukraine) Nadiia Kichenok	5–7, 6–4, [7–10]
Loss	12–17	Mar 2023	Austin Open, US	WTA 250	Hard	(Australia) Ellen Perez	(New Zealand) Erin Routliffe (Indonesia) Aldila Sutjiadi	4–6, 6–3, [8–10]
Loss	12–18	Apr 2023	Stuttgart Grand Prix, Germany	WTA 500	Clay (i)	(Mexico) Giuliana Olmos	(United States) Desirae Krawczyk (Netherlands) Demi Schuurs	4–6, 1–6
Loss	12–19	Jun 2023	Eastbourne International, UK	WTA 500	Grass	(Australia) Ellen Perez	(United States) Desirae Krawczyk (Netherlands) Demi Schuurs	2–6, 4–6
Loss	12–20	Aug 2023	Cincinnati Open, US	WTA 1000	Hard	(Australia) Ellen Perez	(United States) Alycia Parks (United States) Taylor Townsend	7–6^{(7–1)}, 4–6, [6–10]
Loss	12–21	Aug 2023	Tennis in Cleveland, US	WTA 250	Hard	(Australia) Ellen Perez	(Japan) Miyu Kato (Indonesia) Aldila Sutjiadi	4–6, 7–6^{(7–4)}, [8–10]
Loss	12–22	Nov 2023	WTA Finals, Mexico	WTA Finals	Hard	(Australia) Ellen Perez	(Germany) Laura Siegemund; Vera Zvonareva	4–6, 4–6
Loss	12–23	Feb 2024	Ladies Linz, Austria	WTA 500	Hard (i)	(Australia) Ellen Perez	(Italy) Sara Errani (Italy) Jasmine Paolini	5–7, 6–4, [7–10]
Loss	12–24	Feb 2024	Dubai Open, UAE	WTA 1000	Hard	(Australia) Ellen Perez	(Australia) Storm Hunter (Czech Republic) Kateřina Siniaková	4–6, 2–6
Win	13–24	Mar 2024	San Diego Open, US	WTA 500	Hard	(Australia) Ellen Perez	(United States) Desirae Krawczyk (United States) Jessica Pegula	6–1, 6–2
Win	14–24	Jun 2024	Bad Homburg Open, Germany	WTA 500	Grass	(Australia) Ellen Perez	(Chinese Taipei) Chan Hao-ching; Veronika Kudermetova	4–6, 6–3, [10–8]
Win	15–24	Sep 2024	Korea Open, South Korea	WTA 500	Hard	Liudmila Samsonova	(China) Zhang Shuai (Japan) Miyu Kato	6–1, 6–0
Loss	15–25	Oct 2024	Ningbo Open, China	WTA 500	Hard	(Australia) Ellen Perez	(Netherlands) Demi Schuurs (China) Yuan Yue	3–6, 3–6
Loss	15–26	May 2025	Internationaux de Strasbourg, France	WTA 500	Clay	(China) Guo Hanyu	(Hungary) Timea Babos (Brazil) Luisa Stefani	3–6, 7–6^{(7–4)}, [7–10]
Loss	15–27	Jun 2025	Rosmalen Open, Netherlands	WTA 250	Grass	Liudmila Samsonova	Irina Khromacheva (Hungary) Fanny Stollár	5–7, 3–6
Win	16–27	Aug 2025	Monterrey Open, Mexico	WTA 500	Hard	(Spain) Cristina Bucșa	(China) Guo Hanyu; Alexandra Panova	6–2, 6–0
Win	17–27	Sep 2025	Guadalajara Open, Mexico	WTA 500	Hard	Irina Khromacheva	(Mexico) Giuliana Olmos (Indonesia) Aldila Sutjiadi	6–3, 6–4
Win	18–27	Oct 2025	Ningbo Open, China	WTA 500	Hard	Liudmila Samsonova	(Hungary) Timea Babos (Brazil) Luisa Stefani	5–7, 6–4, [10–8]
Win	19–27	Apr 2026	Stuttgart Grand Prix, Germany	WTA 500	Clay (i)	Liudmila Samsonova	(Latvia) Jeļena Ostapenko (China) Zhang Shuai	6–1, 6–1
Loss	19–28	May 2026	Italian Open, Italy	WTA 1000	Clay	(Spain) Cristina Bucșa	Mirra Andreeva; Diana Shnaider	3–6, 3–6
Loss	19–29	Jun 2026	Berlin Open, Germany	WTA 500	Grass	(Italy) Sara Errani	Ekaterina Alexandrova (Czech Republic) Linda Nosková	2–6, 4–6
Loss	19–30	Aug 2026	Canadian Open, Canada	WTA 1000	Hard	(Italy) Sara Errani	(Czech Republic) Katerina Siniakova (China) Zhang Shuai	3–6, 4–6
Win	20–30	Sep 2026	Guadalajara Open, Mexico	WTA 500	Hard	(Spain) Cristina Bucșa	(Japan) Momoko Kobori (Thailand) Peangtarn Plipuech	6–2, 5–7, [10–5]
Loss	20–31	Oct 2026	Ningbo Open, China	WTA 500	Hard	(Spain) Cristina Bucșa	(United States) Desirae Krawczyk (Hungary) Fanny Stollar	6-7, 7-5, [6-10]

== WTA 125 finals ==
=== Doubles: 2 (2 titles) ===
Result	W–L	Date	Tournament	Surface	Partner	Opponents	Score
Win	1–0	Mar 2016	San Antonio Open, US	Hard	(Germany) Anna-Lena Grönefeld	(Poland) Klaudia Jans-Ignacik (Australia) Anastasia Rodionova	6–1, 6–3
Win	2–0	May 2024	Catalonia Open, Spain	Clay	(Australia) Ellen Perez	(Poland) Katarzyna Piter (Egypt) Mayar Sherif	7–5, 6–2

== ITF Circuit finals ==
=== Singles: 4 (2 titles, 2 runner-ups) ===
Legend $25,000 tournaments $10,000 tournaments (2–2)	Finals by surface Hard (2–2) Clay (0–0)

Result	W–L	Date	Tournament	Tier	Surface	Opponent	Score
Loss	0–1	Jul 2011	ITF Evansville, US	10,000	Hard	(United States) Elizabeth Ferris	2–6, 1–6
Win	1–1	Apr 2012	ITF Antalya, Turkey	10,000	Hard	(Turkey) Hülya Esen	6–4, 6–3
Win	2–1	Apr 2012	ITF Antalya, Turkey	10,000	Hard	(Russia) Angelina Gabueva	5–7, 6–4, 6–1
Loss	2–2	Nov 2014	ITF Sousse, Tunisia	10,000	Hard	(Bulgaria) Viktoriya Tomova	3–6, 2–6

=== Doubles: 17 (7 titles, 10 runner-ups) ===
Legend $100,000 tournaments (1–2) $75,000 tournaments (0–1) $50/60,000 tournaments (2–1) $25,000 tournaments (2–0) $10,000 tournaments (2–6)	Finals by surface Hard (3–7) Clay (4–3)

Result	W–L	Date	Tournament	Tier	Surface	Partner	Opponents	Score
Loss	0–1	May 2010	ITF Sumter, US	10,000	Hard	(United States) Alexandra Leatu	(United States) Alexandra Mueller (United States) Ashley Weinhold	1–6, 3–6
Loss	0–2	Nov 2011	ITF Monastir, Tunisia	10,000	Hard	(Ukraine) Anastasia Kharchenko	(Bosnia and Herzegovina) Anita Husarić (Bulgaria) Viktoriya Tomova	3–6, 7–5, [5–10]
Win	1–2	Mar 2012	ITF Metepec, Mexico	25,000	Hard	(United States) Elizabeth Ferris	(Brazil) Liz Tatiane Koehler (United States) Brianna Morgan	6–3, 6–1
Loss	1–3	Apr 2012	ITF Antalya, Turkey	10,000	Hard	(United States) Lauren Megale	(Germany) Nicola Geuer (Austria) Janina Toljan	2–6, 2–6
Loss	1–4	Apr 2012	ITF Antalya, Turkey	10,000	Hard	(Russia) Angelina Gabueva	(Japan) Yuka Mori (Japan) Kaori Onishi	2–6, 4–6
Win	2–4	Mar 2013	ITF Antalya, Turkey	10,000	Clay	(Italy) Gioia Barbieri	(Hungary) Ágnes Bukta (Slovakia) Vivian Juhászová	7–6^{(2)}, 6–4
Win	3–4	Mar 2013	ITF Antalya, Turkey	10,000	Clay	(United States) Anamika Bhargava	(Ukraine) Alona Fomina (Georgia (country)) Sofia Shapatava	6–7^{(7)}, 6–3, [10–7]
Loss	3–5	Mar 2013	ITF Antalya, Turkey	10,000	Hard	(United States) Anamika Bhargava	(Georgia (country)) Oksana Kalashnikova (Kyrgyzstan) Ksenia Palkina	1–6, 3–6
Loss	3–6	May 2013	ITF Sharm El Sheikh, Egypt	10,000	Hard	(Ukraine) Anastasia Kharchenko	(Ukraine) Veronika Stotyka (Ukraine) Vladyslava Zanosiyenko	3–6, 4–6
Win	4–6	Jul 2013	Portland Challenger, US	50,000	Hard	(United States) Irina Falconi	(United States) Sanaz Marand (United States) Ashley Weinhold	4–6, 6–3, [10–8]
Win	5–6	Jan 2014	ITF Daytona Beach, US	25,000	Clay	(Serbia) Teodora Mirčić	(United States) Asia Muhammad (United States) Allie Will	6–7^{(5)}, 7–6^{(1)}, [10–1]
Loss	5–7	Sep 2014	Albuquerque Championships, US	75,000	Hard	(United States) Allie Will	(United States) Jan Abaza (United States) Melanie Oudin	2–6, 3–6
Loss	5–8	May 2015	Open Saint-Gaudens, France	50,000	Clay	(Brazil) Beatriz Haddad Maia	(Colombia) Mariana Duque Mariño (Israel) Julia Glushko	6–1, 6–7^{(5)}, [4–10]
Loss	5–9	Jun 2015	Open de Marseille, France	100,000	Clay	(Ukraine) Maryna Zanevska	(Argentina) Tatiana Búa (France) Laura Thorpe	3–6, 6–3, [6–10]
Win	6–9	May 2016	Open de Marseille, France	100,000	Clay	(Chinese Taipei) Hsieh Su-wei	(Slovakia) Jana Čepelová (Spain) Lourdes Domínguez Lino	1–6, 6–3, [10–3]
Loss	6–10	Jul 2016	Contrexéville Open, France	100,000	Clay	(Czech Republic) Renata Voráčová	(Netherlands) Cindy Burger (Spain) Laura Pous Tió	1–6, 3–6
Win	7–10	Feb 2017	Launceston International, Australia	60,000	Hard	(Australia) Monique Adamczak	(Italy) Georgia Brescia (Slovenia) Tamara Zidanšek	6–1, 6–2

== World TeamTennis ==
Melichar has played three seasons with World TeamTennis, making her debut as a junior in 2010 with the St. Louis Aces. She has since played for the Washington Kastles in 2018 and 2019. It was announced, she will be joining the San Diego Aviators during the 2020 WTT season set to begin July 12.

She partnered with CoCo Vandeweghe in women's doubles for the San Diego Aviators during the 2020 WTT season. Both players were traded to the New York Empires more than halfway through the season. The Empires would ultimately win the 2020 WTT Championship in a Supertiebreaker over the Chicago Smash.
