= Tallinn Open =

Tennis tournament WTA Tour held in Tallinn, Estonia

Defunct tennis tournament
- Founded: 2022
- Abolished: 2022
- Location: Tallinn; Estonia
- Venue: FORUS Tennis Center
- Category: WTA 250
- Surface: Hard (i)
- Draw: 32S / 24Q / 16D
- Prize money: $251,750

Current champions (2022)
- Singles: (Czech Republic) Barbora Krejčíková
- Doubles: (Ukraine) Lyudmyla Kichenok (Ukraine) Nadiia Kichenok

The Tallinn Open was a tennis event held in Tallinn, Estonia. The first and only edition took place in October 2022. The event was part of the WTA Tour and is listed as a WTA 250 tournament. The tournament was introduced in 2022 as a result of the cancellation of WTA events in China due to the Peng Shuai sexual assault and disappearance controversy. Estonia's top ranked player Anett Kontaveit played a major role in bringing the event to Estonia, after facing political resistance. In 2023, it was announced that the tournament would no longer be held due to being unable to find financial support and the requirement of allowing athletes from Belarus and Russia to compete.

The tournament was held at the FORUS Spordikeskus Tondi (Tondi Tennis Center) on indoor hardcourts.

== Past finals ==
=== Singles ===
Year	Champion	Runner-up	Score
2022	(Czech Republic) Barbora Krejčíková	(Estonia) Anett Kontaveit	6–2, 6–3

=== Doubles ===
Year	Champions	Runners-up	Score
2022	(Ukraine) Lyudmyla Kichenok (Ukraine) Nadiia Kichenok	(United States) Nicole Melichar-Martinez (Germany) Laura Siegemund	7–5, 4–6, [10–7]

== See also ==
- Baltic Open
