= Amanda Anisimova career statistics =

Career finals
Discipline	Type	Won	Lost	Total
Singles	Grand Slam	0	2	2
Singles	WTA Finals	–	–	–
Singles	WTA 1000	2	1	3
Singles	WTA Tour	2	2	4
Singles	Olympics	–	–	–
Singles	Total	4	5	9
Doubles	Grand Slam	–	–	–
Doubles	WTA Finals	–	–	–
Doubles	WTA 1000	–	–	–
Doubles	WTA Tour	–	–	–
Doubles	Olympics	–	–	–
Doubles	Total	–	–	–

This is a list of the main career statistics of American professional tennis player Amanda Anisimova.

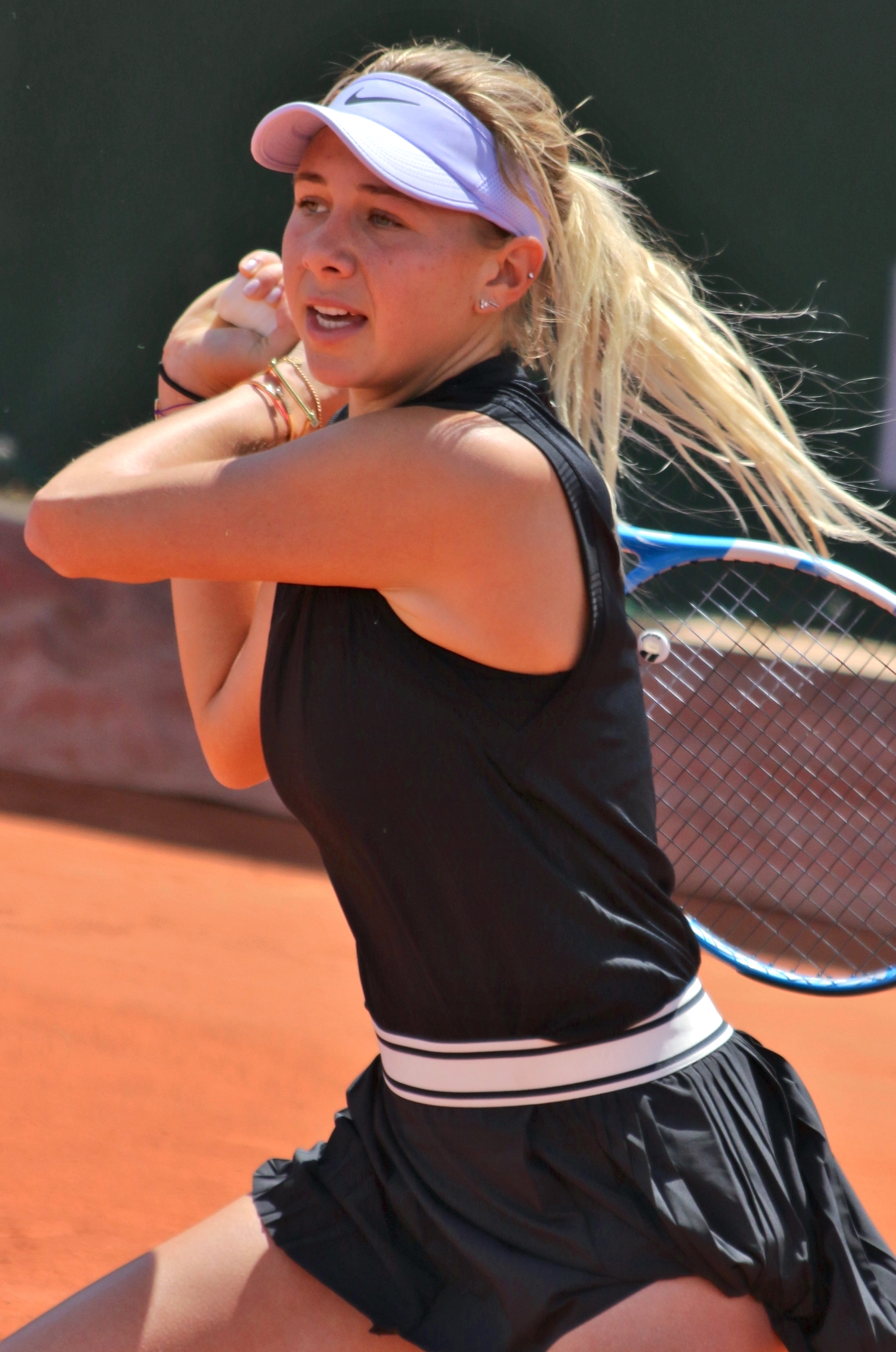
Anisimova at the 2019 French Open

== Performance timelines ==
Key
W	F	SF	QF	#R	RR	Q#	P#	DNQ	A	Z#	PO	G	S	B	NMS	NTI	P	NH

(W) winner; (F) finalist; (SF) semifinalist; (QF) quarterfinalist; (#R) rounds 4, 3, 2, 1; (RR) round-robin stage; (Q#) qualification round; (P#) preliminary round; (DNQ) did not qualify; (A) absent; (Z#) Davis/Fed Cup Zonal Group (with number indication) or (PO) play-off; (G) gold, (S) silver or (B) bronze Olympic/Paralympic medal; (NMS) not a Masters tournament; (NTI) not a Tier I tournament; (P) postponed; (NH) not held; (SR) strike rate (events won / competed); (W–L) win–loss record.
To avoid confusion and double counting, these charts are updated at the conclusion of a tournament or when the player's participation has ended.

Only main-draw results in WTA Tour, Grand Slam tournaments, Fed Cup/Billie Jean King Cup and Olympic Games are included in win–loss records.

=== Singles ===
Current through the 2026 Cincinnati Open.

Tournament	2016	2017	2018	2019	2020	2021	2022	2023	2024	2025	2026	SR	W–L	Win %
Grand Slam tournaments
Australian Open	A	A	A	4R	1R	A	4R	1R	4R	2R	QF	0 / 7	14–7	67%
French Open	A	1R	A	SF	3R	1R	4R	A	2R	4R	3R	0 / 7	16–8	67%
Wimbledon	A	A	A	2R	NH	1R	QF	A	Q3	F	3R	0 / 5	13–5	72%
US Open	Q2	Q1	1R	A	3R	2R	1R	A	1R	F	3R	0 / 7	11–7	61%
Win–Loss	0–0	0–1	0–1	9–3	4–3	1–3	10–4	0–1	4–3	16–4	10–4	0 / 27	54–27	67%
Year-end championships
WTA Finals	Did Not Qualify				NH	Did Not Qualify				SF		0 / 1	2–2	50%
WTA Elite Trophy (Note: WTA Tournament of Champions was held from 2009 to 2014, when WTA Elite Trophy replaced it.)	Did Not Qualify			A (Note: Anisimova was invited to the 2019 WTA Elite Trophy but declined the invitation.)	Not Held			DNQ	Not Held			0 / 0	0–0	–
WTA 1000 tournaments
Qatar Open	A	NTI	A	NTI	3R (Note: Withdrew during the tournament. Not counted as a loss.)	NTI	2R	NTI	A	W	2R	1 / 4	9–2	82%
Dubai Championships	NTI	A	NTI	A	NTI	2R	NTI	2R	A	1R	SF	0 / 4	4–4	50%
Indian Wells	A	A	4R	2R	NH	3R	2R	2R	A	2R	4R	0 / 7	9–7	56%
Miami Open	A	1R	2R	2R	NH	3R	1R	1R	A	4R	4R	0 / 8	7–7	50%
Madrid Open	A	A	A	Q1	NH	1R	QF	1R	1R	2R	A	0 / 5	3–5	38%
Italian Open	A	A	A	2R	2R	2R	QF	A	1R	2R	A	0 / 6	6–6	50%
Canadian Open	A	A	A	A	NH	3R	2R	A	F	4R	4R	0 / 5	9–4	69%
Cincinnati Open	A	A	3R	A	2R	A	2R	A	A	3R	QF	0 / 4	8–5	62%
China Open	A	A	A	1R	Not Held			A	4R	W		1 / 2	8–2	80%
Wuhan Open	A	A	Q1	2R	Not Held				2R	A		0 / 2	2–1	67%
Career statistics
	2016	2017	2018	2019	2020	2021	2022	2023	2024	2025	2026	SR	W–L	Win %
Tournaments	0	2	6	14	10	15	15	7	11	15	14	Career total: 109		
Titles	0	0	0	1	0	0	1	0	0	2	0	Career total: 4		
Finals	0	0	1	1	0	0	1	0	1	5	0	Career total: 9		
Overall Win–Loss	0–0	0–2	11–5	23–13	11–9	14–15	33–13	2–7	20–12	45–16	22–12	3 / 109	171–101	63%
Win %	–	0%	69%	64%	55%	48%	72%	22%	63%	72%	65%	Career total: 63%		
Year-end ranking	764	192	95	24	30	78	23	359	36	4		$13,302,982		

=== Doubles ===
Current through the 2022 WTA Tour.

Tournament	2017	2018	2019	2020	2021	2022	SR	W–L
Grand Slam tournaments
Australian Open	A	A	1R	A	A	A	0 / 1	0–1
French Open	A	A	2R	A	2R	A	0 / 2	2–2
Wimbledon	A	A	A	NH	A	A	0 / 0	0–0
US Open	1R	A	A	A	A	A	0 / 1	0–1
Win–Loss	0–1	0–0	1–2	0–0	1–1	0–0	0 / 4	2–4
WTA 1000 tournaments
Indian Wells Open	A	A	A	NH	1R	A	0 / 1	0–1
Miami Open	A	A	1R	NH	A	A	0 / 1	0–1
Career statistics
Tournaments	1	0	4	0	3	0	Career total: 8	
Overall Win–Loss	0–1	0–0	1–4	0–0	1–3	0–0	0 / 8	2–8
Year-end ranking	777	n/a	414	468	488	n/a		

== Grand Slam tournament finals ==
=== Singles: 2 (2 runner-ups) ===
Result	Year	Tournament	Surface	Opponent	Score
Loss	2025	Wimbledon	Grass	(Poland) Iga Świątek	0–6, 0–6
Loss	2025	US Open	Hard	Aryna Sabalenka	3–6, 6–7^{(3–7)}

== Other significant finals ==
=== WTA 1000 tournaments ===
==== Singles: 3 (2 titles, 1 runner-up) ====
Result	Year	Tournament	Surface	Opponent	Score
Loss	2024	Canadian Open	Hard	(United States) Jessica Pegula	3–6, 6–2, 1–6
Win	2025	Qatar Ladies Open	Hard	(Latvia) Jeļena Ostapenko	6–4, 6–3
Win	2025	China Open	Hard	(Czech Republic) Linda Nosková	6–0, 2–6, 6–2

== WTA Tour finals ==
=== Singles: 9 (4 titles, 5 runner-ups) ===
Legend Grand Slam (0–2) WTA 1000 (2–1) WTA 500 (0–1) International / WTA 250 (2–1)	Finals by surface Hard (3–3) Clay (1–0) Grass (0–2)	Finals by setting Outdoor (4–5)

Result	W–L	Date	Tournament	Tier	Surface	Opponent	Score
Loss	0–1	Sep 2018	Japan Women's Open, Japan	International	Hard	(Chinese Taipei) Hsieh Su-wei	2–6, 2–6
Win	1–1	Apr 2019	Copa Colsanitas, Colombia	International	Clay	(Australia) Astra Sharma	4–6, 6–4, 6–1
Win	2–1	Jan 2022	Melbourne Summer Set, Australia	WTA 250	Hard	(Belarus) Aliaksandra Sasnovich	7–5, 1–6, 6–4
Loss	2–2	Aug 2024	Canadian Open, Canada	WTA 1000	Hard	(United States) Jessica Pegula	3–6, 6–2, 1–6
Win	3–2	Feb 2025	Qatar Ladies Open, Qatar	WTA 1000	Hard	(Latvia) Jeļena Ostapenko	6–4, 6–3
Loss	3–3	Jun 2025	Queen's Club Championships, United Kingdom	WTA 500	Grass	(Germany) Tatjana Maria	3–6, 4–6
Loss	3–4	Jul 2025	Wimbledon, United Kingdom	Grand Slam	Grass	(Poland) Iga Świątek	0–6, 0–6
Loss	3–5	Sep 2025	US Open, United States	Grand Slam	Hard	Aryna Sabalenka	3–6, 6–7^{(3–7)}
Win	4–5	Oct 2025	China Open, China	WTA 1000	Hard	(Czech Republic) Linda Nosková	6–0, 2–6, 6–2

== ITF Circuit finals ==
=== Singles: 4 (1 title, 3 runner-ups) ===
Legend $80,000 tournaments $60,000 tournaments $25,000 tournaments	Finals by surface Hard (1–0) Clay (0–3)

Result	W–L	Date	Tournament	Tier	Surface	Opponent	Score
Loss	0–1	Mar 2017	ITF Curitiba, Brazil	25,000	Clay	(Russia) Anastasia Potapova	7–6^{(9–7)}, 5–7, 2–6
Loss	0–2	Apr 2017	ITF Indian Harbour Beach, United States	80,000	Clay	(Belarus) Olga Govortsova	3–6, 6–4, 3–6
Loss	0–3	Apr 2017	Dothan Pro Classic, United States	60,000	Clay	(United States) Kristie Ahn	6–1, 2–6, 2–6
Win	1–3	Jul 2017	Sacramento Challenger, United States	60,000	Hard	(Croatia) Ajla Tomljanović	walkover

== Junior finals ==
=== Grand Slam tournaments ===
==== Singles: 2 (1 title, 1 runner-up) ====
Result	Year	Tournament	Surface	Opponent	Score
Loss	2016	French Open	Clay	(Switzerland) Rebeka Masarova	5–7, 5–7
Win	2017	US Open	Hard	(United States) Coco Gauff	6–0, 6–2

=== ITF Junior Circuit ===
Legend
Grade A
Grade 1

==== Singles: 7 (5 titles, 2 runner-ups) ====
Result	W–L	Date	Tournament	Tier	Surface	Opponent	Score
Win	1–0	Nov 2015	ITF Mexico City	GA	Clay	(United Kingdom) Katie Swan	7–5, 3–6, 6–3
Win	2–0	Jan 2016	ITF San Jose, Costa Rica	G1	Hard	(United States) Hurricane Tyra Black	6–2, 6–2
Loss	2–1	Mar 2016	ITF Porto Alegre, Brazil	GA	Clay	(United States) Usue Maitane Arconada	6–0, 4–6, 2–6
Loss	2–2	Jun 2016	French Open	GA	Clay	(Switzerland) Rebeka Masarova	5–7, 5–7
Win	3–2	Nov 2016	ITF Mérida, Mexico	G1	Clay	(United Kingdom) Jodie Burrage	6–2, 6–1
Win	4–2	Feb 2017	ITF Porto Alegre, Brazil	GA	Clay	(United States) Sofia Sewing	7–5, 6–1
Win	5–2	Sep 2017	US Open	GA	Hard	(United States) Coco Gauff	6–0, 6–2

== WTA Tour career earnings ==
Current after the 2022 Wimbledon.

Year	Grand Slam titles	WTA titles	Total titles	Earnings ($)	Money list rank
2016	0	0	0	10,706	517
2017	0	0	0	99,166	202
2018	0	0	0	247,910	138
2019	0	1	1	1,199,409	34
2020	0	0	0	478,126	45
2021	0	0	0	455,178	95
2022	0	1	1	1,298,913	15
Career	0	2	2	3,792,367	173

== Career Grand Slam statistics ==
=== Seedings ===
Tournaments won by Anisimova are in boldface, and advanced into finals by Anisimova are in italics.

Year	Australian Open	French Open	Wimbledon	US Open
2016	did not play	did not play	did not play	did not qualify
2017	did not play	wildcard	did not play	did not qualify
2018	did not play	did not play	did not play	wildcard
2019	not seeded	not seeded	25th	did not play
2020	21st	25th	cancelled	22nd
2021	did not play	not seeded	not seeded	not seeded
2022	not seeded	27th	20th	24th
2023	28th	did not play	did not play	did not play
2024	protected ranking	protected ranking	did not qualify	wildcard
2025	not seeded	16th	13th (1)	8th (2)
2026	4th	6th		

=== Best Grand Slam tournament results details ===
Grand Slam tournament winners are in boldface, and runner–ups are in italics.

==== Singles ====
**Australian Open**
**2026 (4th seed)**
Round	Opponent	Rank	Score
1R	(Switzerland) Simona Waltert	87	6–3, 6–2
2R	(Czech Republic) Kateřina Siniaková	45	6–1, 6–4
3R	(United States) Peyton Stearns	68	6–1, 6–4
4R	(China) Wang Xinyu	46	7–6^{(7–4)}, 6–4
QF	(United States) Jessica Pegula (6)	6	2–6, 6–7^{(1–7)}

**Wimbledon**
**2025 (13th seed)**
Round	Opponent	Rank	Score
1R	(Kazakhstan) Yulia Putintseva	33	6–0, 6–0
2R	(Mexico) Renata Zarazúa	71	6–4, 6–3
3R	(Hungary) Dalma Gálfi	110	6–3, 5–7, 6–3
4R	(Czech Republic) Linda Nosková (30)	27	6–2, 5–7, 6–4
QF	Anastasia Pavlyuchenkova	50	6–0, 7–6^{(11–9)}
SF	Aryna Sabalenka (1)	**1**	6–4, 4–6, 6–4
F	**(Poland) Iga Świątek (8)**	4	0–6, 0–6

**French Open**
**2019 (unseeded)**
Round	Opponent	Rank	Score
1R	(France) Harmony Tan (WC)	265	6–3, 6–1
2R	(Belarus) Aryna Sabalenka (11)	11	6–4, 6–2
3R	(Romania) Irina-Camelia Begu	116	7–6^{(8–6)}, 6–4
4R	(Spain) Aliona Bolsova (Q)	137	6–3, 6–0
QF	(Romania) Simona Halep (3)	3	6–2, 6–4
SF	**(Australia) Ashleigh Barty (8)**	8	7–6^{(7–4)}, 3–6, 3–6

**US Open**
**2025 (8th seed)**
Round	Opponent	Rank	Score
1R	(Australia) Kimberly Birrell	83	6–3, 6–2
2R	(Australia) Maya Joint	43	7–6^{(7–2)}, 6–2
3R	(Romania) Jaqueline Cristian	50	6–4, 4–6, 6–2
4R	(Brazil) Beatriz Haddad Maia (18)	22	6–0, 6–3
QF	(Poland) Iga Świątek (2)	2	6–4, 6–3
SF	(Japan) Naomi Osaka (23)	24	6–7^{(4–7)}, 7–6^{(7–3)}, 6–3
F	**Aryna Sabalenka (1)**	**1**	3–6, 6–7^{(3–7)}

== Wins against top 10 players ==
Season	2018	2019	2020	2021	2022	2023	2024	2025	2026	Total
Wins	1	1	1	0	4	0	1	10	2	20

No.	Player	Rk	Event	Surface	Rd	Score	Rk	Years	Ref
1.	(Czech Republic) Petra Kvitová	9	Indian Wells Open, US	Hard	3R	6–2, 6–4	149	2018	
2.	(Romania) Simona Halep	3	French Open, France	Clay	QF	6–2, 6–4	51	2019	
3.	(Ukraine) Elina Svitolina	7	Qatar Open, Qatar	Hard	2R	6–3, 6–3	29	2020	
4.	Aryna Sabalenka	5	Charleston Open, US	Clay	3R	4–6, 6–4, 6–3	47	2022	
5.	Aryna Sabalenka	4	Madrid Open, Spain	Clay	1R	6–2, 3–6, 6–4	33	2022	
6.	(United States) Danielle Collins	9	Italian Open, Italy	Clay	3R	6–2, 6–2	32	2022	
7.	Daria Kasatkina	10	Cincinnati Open, US	Hard	1R	6–4, 6–4	23	2022	
8.	Aryna Sabalenka	3	Canadian Open	Hard	QF	6–4, 6–2	132	2024	
9.	(Spain) Paula Badosa	10	Qatar Ladies Open	Hard	2R	6–4, 6–3	41	2025	
10.	Mirra Andreeva	6	Miami Open, United States	Hard	3R	7–6^{(7–5)}, 2–6, 6–3	17	2025	
11.	(United States) Emma Navarro	10	Queen's Club, United Kingdom	Grass	QF	6–3, 6–3	15	2025	
12.	(China) Zheng Qinwen	5	Queen's Club, United Kingdom	Grass	SF	6–2, 4–6, 6–4	15	2025	
13.	Aryna Sabalenka	1	Wimbledon, United Kingdom	Grass	SF	6–4, 4–6, 6–4	12	2025	
14.	(Poland) Iga Świątek	2	US Open, United States	Hard	QF	6–4, 6–3	9	2025	
15.	(Italy) Jasmine Paolini	8	China Open, China	Hard	QF	6–7^{(4–7)}, 6–3, 6–4	4	2025	
16.	(United States) Coco Gauff	3	China Open, China	Hard	SF	6–1, 6–2	4	2025	
17.	(United States) Madison Keys	7	WTA Finals, Saudi Arabia	Hard (i)	RR	4–6, 6–3, 6–2	4	2025	
18.	(Poland) Iga Świątek	2	WTA Finals, Saudi Arabia	Hard (i)	RR	6–7^{(3–7)}, 6–4, 6–2	4	2025	
19.	Mirra Andreeva	7	Dubai Championships, UAE	Hard	QF	2–6, 7–5, 7–6^{(7–4)}	6	2026	
20.	(Czech Republic) Linda Nosková	8	Cincinnati Open, US	Hard	4R	6-1, 6-4	10	2026	

- Key: (Rk) first use, opponent rank; (Rd) round; (Rk) 2nd use, player rank; (Ref) reference; (F) final; (SF) semifinal; (QF) quarterfinal; (#R) rounds 4, 3, 2, 1; (RR) round-robin stage; (Q#) qualifying rounds or stages (3), 2, 1.
