= 2022 Melbourne Summer Set 1 – Women's singles =

Women's singles
- 2022 Melbourne Summer Set 1

Final
- Champion: (Romania) Simona Halep
- Runner-up: (Russia) Veronika Kudermetova
- Score: 6–2, 6–3

Details
- Draw: 32 (6 Q / 3 WC )
- Seeds: 8

Events
Singles	men	women
Doubles	men	women
- Melbourne Summer Set

Simona Halep defeated Veronika Kudermetova in the final, 6–2, 6–3 to win the women's singles tennis title at the 2022 Melbourne Summer Set 1. It was Halep's 23rd WTA Tour-level singles title, and her first in Australia.

This was the first edition of the tournament.

== Seeds ==
1. (Japan) Naomi Osaka (semi-finals, withdrew)
2. (Romania) Simona Halep (champion)
3. (Russia) Veronika Kudermetova (final)
4. (Italy) Camila Giorgi (withdrew)
5. (Russia) Liudmila Samsonova (first round)
6. (Switzerland) Viktorija Golubic (quarter-finals)
7. (Czech Republic) Tereza Martincová (first round)
8. (Czech Republic) Kateřina Siniaková (first round)
9. (United States) Alison Riske (first round)

== Draw ==
Key

- Q = Qualifier
- WC = Wild card
- LL = Lucky loser
- Alt = Alternate
- ITF = ITF entry
- PR = Protected ranking
- SR = Special ranking
- SE = Special exempt
- JE = Junior exempt
- JR = Junior Accelerator Programme entrant
- CO = College Accelerator Programme entrant
- NG = Next Gen Accelerator Program entrant
- w/o = Walkover
- r = Retired
- d = Defaulted

=== Finals ===
Semi-finals
1	(Japan) Naomi Osaka
3	(Russia) Veronika Kudermetova	w/o
Q	(China) Zheng Qinwen	3	2
2	(Romania) Simona Halep	6	6

Final
3	(Russia) Veronika Kudermetova	2	3
2	(Romania) Simona Halep	6	6

=== Top half ===
First round
1	(Japan) N Osaka	6	3	6
(France) A Cornet	4	6	3
(Croatia) P Martić	3	4
(Belgium) M Zanevska	6	6
(China) S Zhang	3	6^{6}
(France) C Burel	6	7^{8}
(Germany) A Petkovic	6	7^{7}
5	(Russia) L Samsonova	3	6^{3}
3	(Russia) V Kudermetova	7^{7}	7^{8}
Q	(Slovakia) V Kužmová	6^{4}	6^{6}
(United States) M Brengle	7^{7}	7^{7}
Q	(Japan) N Hibino	6^{3}	6^{4}
(Russia) A Potapova	5	6	6
WC	(Australia) L Cabrera	7	2	2
Q	(Hungary) A Bondár	7	7^{10}
8	(Czech Republic) K Siniaková	5	6^{8}

Second round
1	(Japan) N Osaka	6	6
(Belgium) M Zanevska	1	1
(France) C Burel	5	6	4
(Germany) A Petkovic	7	2	6
3	(Russia) V Kudermetova	6	3	7
(United States) M Brengle	0	6	5
(Russia) A Potapova	6	6^{4}	7
Q	(Hungary) A Bondár	4	7^{7}	5

Quarter-finals
1	(Japan) N Osaka	6	7
(Germany) A Petkovic	1	5
3	(Russia) V Kudermetova	6	4	6
(Russia) A Potapova	2	6	0

Semi-finals
1	(Japan) N Osaka
3	(Russia) V Kudermetova	w/o

=== Bottom half ===
First round
7	(Czech Republic) T Martincová	4	4
(Croatia) A Konjuh	6	6
(Romania) J Cristian	7^{7}	6^{7}	2
(Estonia) K Kanepi	6^{2}	7^{9}	6
LL	(Japan) M Hontama	6	2	3
Q	(China) Q Zheng	4	6	6
(Russia) V Zvonareva	7	6
9	(United States) A Riske	5	3
6	(Switzerland) V Golubic	7	6
Alt	(United States) L Davis	5	1
Q	(Netherlands) L Pattinama Kerkhove	6	6
WC	(Australia) S Mendez	3	4
(Romania) E-G Ruse	6	6
WC	(Australia) Ar Rodionova	3	2
Q	(Australia) D Aiava	4	2
2	(Romania) S Halep	6	6

Second round
(Croatia) A Konjuh	6	3	6
(Estonia) K Kanepi	2	6	3
Q	(China) Q Zheng	5	6	6
(Russia) V Zvonareva	7	3	4
6	(Switzerland) V Golubic	6	6
Q	(Netherlands) L Pattinama Kerkhove	3	0
(Romania) E-G Ruse	2	1
2	(Romania) S Halep	6	6

Quarter-finals
(Croatia) A Konjuh	6^{1}	6^{6}
Q	(China) Q Zheng	7^{7}	7^{8}
6	(Switzerland) V Golubic	2	7	4
2	(Romania) S Halep	6	5	6

Semi-finals
Q	(China) Q Zheng	3	2
2	(Romania) S Halep	6	6

== Qualifying ==
=== Seeds ===
1. (United States) Lauren Davis (moved to main draw)
2. (Hungary) Anna Bondár (qualified)
3. (United States) Bernarda Pera (qualifying competition)
4. (Montenegro) Danka Kovinić (qualifying competition, withdrew)
5. (Ukraine) Dayana Yastremska (first round)
6. (China) Wang Qiang (first round)
7. (Poland) Magdalena Fręch (first round)
8. (Italy) Martina Trevisan (first round)
9. (Bulgaria) Viktoriya Tomova (first round)
10. (Italy) Sara Errani (first round)
11. (China) Zheng Qinwen (qualified)
12. (Japan) Nao Hibino (qualified)

=== Qualifiers ===
1. (Slovakia) Viktória Kužmová
2. (Hungary) Anna Bondár
3. (China) Zheng Qinwen
4. (Japan) Nao Hibino
5. (Netherlands) Lesley Pattinama Kerkhove
6. (Australia) Destanee Aiava

=== Lucky loser ===
1. (Japan) Mai Hontama

=== Qualifying draw ===
==== First qualifier ====
First round
Alt	(Chinese Taipei) Liang En-shuo	4	6^{4}
(Belarus) Olga Govortsova	6	7^{7}
(Slovakia) Viktória Kužmová	7^{9}	6
7	(Poland) Magdalena Fręch	6^{7}	3

Qualifying competition
(Belarus) Olga Govortsova	1	0^{r}
(Slovakia) Viktória Kužmová	6	0

==== Second qualifier ====
First round
2	(Hungary) Anna Bondár	6	6
(Switzerland) Leonie Küng	3	2
(Japan) Mai Hontama	7	7
9	(Bulgaria) Viktoriya Tomova	5	5

Qualifying competition
2	(Hungary) Anna Bondár	7^{7}	6
(Japan) Mai Hontama	6^{4}	4

==== Third qualifier ====
First round
3	(United States) Bernarda Pera	6	6
(Slovakia) Rebecca Šramková	0	2
(Germany) Jule Niemeier	4	0
11	(China) Zheng Qinwen	6	6

Qualifying competition
3	(United States) Bernarda Pera	3	6	5
11	(China) Zheng Qinwen	6	1	7

==== Fourth qualifier ====
First round
4	(Montenegro) Danka Kovinić	6	6
WC	(Australia) Alexandra Osborne	2	1
(Poland) Katarzyna Kawa	3	0
12	(Japan) Nao Hibino	6	6

Qualifying competition
4	(Montenegro) Danka Kovinić
12	(Japan) Nao Hibino	w/o

==== Fifth qualifier ====
First round
5	(Ukraine) Dayana Yastremska	2	2
(Netherlands) Lesley Pattinama Kerkhove	6	6
WC	(Australia) Kimberly Birrell	6	4	6
8	(Italy) Martina Trevisan	3	6	3

Qualifying competition
(Netherlands) Lesley Pattinama Kerkhove	6	6
WC	(Australia) Kimberly Birrell	4	4

==== Sixth qualifier ====
First round
6	(China) Wang Qiang	6^{9}	4
WC	(Australia) Destanee Aiava	7^{11}	6
WC	(Australia) Taylah Preston	7	2	6
10	(Italy) Sara Errani	5	6	3

Qualifying competition
WC	(Australia) Destanee Aiava	6	6
WC	(Australia) Taylah Preston	4	4

== See also ==
- 2022 Melbourne Summer Set 2 – Singles
