= 2022 Melbourne Summer Set =

2022 Melbourne Summer Set may refer to:

- 2022 Melbourne Summer Set 1
- 2022 Melbourne Summer Set 2
