= 2022 Melbourne Summer Set 1 – Men's singles =

Men's singles
- 2022 Melbourne Summer Set 1

Final
- Champion: (Spain) Rafael Nadal
- Runner-up: (United States) Maxime Cressy
- Score: 7–6^{(8–6)}, 6–3

Details
- Draw: 28 (4 Q / 2 WC)
- Seeds: 8

Events
Singles	men	women
Doubles	men	women
- Melbourne Summer Set

Rafael Nadal defeated Maxime Cressy in the final, 7–6^{(8–6)}, 6–3 to win the men's singles title at the 2022 Melbourne Summer Set 1. It was his 89th career ATP title. Cressy entered the tournament as a qualifier and was contesting his first tour-level final.

This was the first edition of the tournament.

== Seeds ==
The top four seeds received a bye into the second round.

1. (Spain) Rafael Nadal (champion)
2. (United States) Reilly Opelka (second round)
3. (Bulgaria) Grigor Dimitrov (semifinals)
4. (Belgium) David Goffin (second round)
5. (France) Benoît Paire (first round, retired)
6. (Belarus) Ilya Ivashka (withdrew)
7. (Germany) Dominik Koepfer (first round)
8. (United States) Mackenzie McDonald (second round)

== Draw ==
Key

- Q = Qualifier
- WC = Wild card
- LL = Lucky loser
- Alt = Alternate
- ITF = ITF entry
- PR = Protected ranking
- SR = Special ranking
- SE = Special exempt
- JE = Junior exempt
- JR = Junior Accelerator Programme entrant
- CO = College Accelerator Programme entrant
- NG = Next Gen Accelerator Program entrant
- w/o = Walkover
- r = Retired
- d = Defaulted

=== Finals ===
Semifinals
1	(Spain) Rafael Nadal	6	7
Alt	(Finland) Emil Ruusuvuori	4	5
3	(Bulgaria) Grigor Dimitrov	5	6^{9}
Q	(United States) Maxime Cressy	7	7^{11}

Final
1	(Spain) Rafael Nadal	7^{8}	6
Q	(United States) Maxime Cressy	6^{6}	3

=== Top half ===
First round
Q	(Lithuania) R Berankis	7	6
(United States) M Giron	5	4
(Australia) A Popyrin	7^{7}	6
(Italy) S Travaglia	6^{5}	3
(Netherlands) T Griekspoor	6	6
7	(Germany) D Koepfer	3	4
(Slovakia) A Molčan	6	6^{6}	6
Q	(Italy) A Seppi	4	7^{8}	3
WC	(Australia) C O'Connell	6	5	4
(Australia) J Thompson	1	7	6
Alt	(Finland) E Ruusuvuori	7^{7}	6
LL	(Argentina) S Báez	6^{2}	1

Second round
1	(Spain) R Nadal	6	7
Q	(Lithuania) R Berankis	2	5
(Australia) A Popyrin	3	6	3
(Netherlands) T Griekspoor	6	4	6
4	(Belgium) D Goffin	5	3
(Slovakia) A Molčan	7	6
(Australia) J Thompson	6^{3}	7	3
Alt	(Finland) E Ruusuvuori	7^{7}	5	6

Quarterfinals
1	(Spain) R Nadal	w/o
(Netherlands) T Griekspoor
(Slovakia) A Molčan	2	1
Alt	(Finland) E Ruusuvuori	6	6

Semifinals
1	(Spain) R Nadal	6	7
Alt	(Finland) E Ruusuvuori	4	5

=== Bottom half ===
First round
8	(United States) M McDonald	6	6
(Germany) P Gojowczyk	0	3
(France) A Mannarino	4	3
(Netherlands) B van de Zandschulp	6	6
(Argentina) F Bagnis	6	5	6
WC	(United Kingdom) A Murray	3	7	3
5	(France) B Paire	6	3	2^{r}
LL	(Switzerland) H Laaksonen	4	6	5
(Spain) J Munar	6	6
(South Africa) K Anderson	4	4
Q	(United States) M Cressy	6	6
Q	(Australia) R Hijikata	3	0

Second round
8	(United States) M McDonald	2	5
(Netherlands) B van de Zandschulp	6	7
(Argentina) F Bagnis	7	6^{3}	3
3	(Bulgaria) G Dimitrov	5	7^{7}	6
LL	(Switzerland) H Laaksonen	1	5
(Spain) J Munar	6	7
Q	(United States) M Cressy	4	7^{7}	7^{11}
2	(United States) R Opelka	6	6^{5}	6^{9}

Quarterfinals
(Netherlands) B van de Zandschulp	7^{7}	0	5
3	(Bulgaria) G Dimitrov	6^{5}	6	7
(Spain) J Munar	6^{3}	4
Q	(United States) M Cressy	7^{7}	6

Semifinals
3	(Bulgaria) G Dimitrov	5	6^{9}
Q	(United States) M Cressy	7	7^{11}

== Qualifying ==
=== Seeds ===
1. (Finland) Emil Ruusuvuori (moved to main draw)
2. (Switzerland) Henri Laaksonen (qualifying competition, lucky loser)
3. (Argentina) Sebastián Báez (qualifying competition, lucky loser)
4. (Italy) Marco Cecchinato (withdrew)
5. (Italy) Andreas Seppi (qualified)
6. (Lithuania) Ričardas Berankis (qualified)
7. (United States) Denis Kudla (first round)
8. (United States) Maxime Cressy (qualified)

=== Qualifiers ===
1. (Lithuania) Ričardas Berankis
2. (Australia) Rinky Hijikata
3. (Italy) Andreas Seppi
4. (United States) Maxime Cressy

=== Lucky losers ===
1. (Switzerland) Henri Laaksonen
2. (Argentina) Sebastián Báez

=== Qualifying draw ===
==== First qualifier ====
First round
Alt	(Turkey) Altuğ Çelikbilek	6	6
(Slovakia) Norbert Gombos	4	4
(Argentina) Tomás Martín Etcheverry	4	2
6	(Lithuania) Ričardas Berankis	6	6

Qualifying competition
Alt	(Turkey) Altuğ Çelikbilek	7	2	1
6	(Lithuania) Ričardas Berankis	5	6	6

==== Second qualifier ====
First round
2	(Switzerland) Henri Laaksonen	6	6
(Slovakia) Jozef Kovalík	4	2
WC	(Australia) Rinky Hijikata	6	7
7	(United States) Denis Kudla	1	5

Qualifying competition
2	(Switzerland) Henri Laaksonen	6	6^{8}	4
WC	(Australia) Rinky Hijikata	4	7^{10}	6

==== Third qualifier ====
First round
3	(Argentina) Sebastián Báez	7	6
WC	(Australia) Marc Polmans	5	2
(Spain) Bernabé Zapata Miralles	4	6^{3}
5	(Italy) Andreas Seppi	6	7^{7}

Qualifying competition
3	(Argentina) Sebastián Báez	5	6^{1}
5	(Italy) Andreas Seppi	7	7^{7}

==== Fourth qualifier ====
First round
Alt	(Italy) Andrea Vavassori	6^{3}	7^{7}	6
(France) Lucas Pouille	7^{7}	6^{5}	3
(Portugal) João Sousa	2	3
8	(United States) Maxime Cressy	6	6

Qualifying competition
Alt	(Italy) Andrea Vavassori	6^{6}	6^{10}
8	(United States) Maxime Cressy	7^{8}	7^{12}

== See also ==
- 2022 Melbourne Summer Set 2
