= 2022 Melbourne Summer Set 1 – Men's doubles =

Men's doubles
- 2022 Melbourne Summer Set 1

Final
- Champions: (Netherlands) Wesley Koolhof (United Kingdom) Neal Skupski
- Runners-up: (Kazakhstan) Aleksandr Nedovyesov (Pakistan) Aisam-ul-Haq Qureshi
- Score: 6–4, 6–4

Events
Singles	men	women
Doubles	men	women
- Melbourne Summer Set

Wesley Koolhof and Neal Skupski defeated Aleksandr Nedovyesov and Aisam-ul-Haq Qureshi in the final, 6–4, 6–4 to win the men's doubles tennis title at the 2022 Melbourne Summer Set 1.

This was the first edition of the tournament.

== Seeds ==
All seeds received a bye into the second round.

1. (Netherlands) Wesley Koolhof / (United Kingdom) Neal Skupski (champions)
2. (South Africa) Raven Klaasen / (Japan) Ben McLachlan (second round)
3. (El Salvador) Marcelo Arévalo / (Netherlands) Jean-Julien Rojer (semifinals)
4. (Kazakhstan) Andrey Golubev / (Croatia) Franko Škugor (quarterfinals)
5. (United Kingdom) Dominic Inglot / (United Kingdom) Ken Skupski (second round)
6. (Kazakhstan) Aleksandr Nedovyesov / (Pakistan) Aisam-ul-Haq Qureshi (final)
7. (Monaco) Romain Arneodo / (Germany) Andreas Mies (quarterfinals, withdrew)
8. (Australia) Matt Reid / (Australia) Jordan Thompson (second round)

== Draw ==
=== Finals ===
Semifinals
1	(Netherlands) Wesley Koolhof (United Kingdom) Neal Skupski	6	6
3	(El Salvador) Marcelo Arévalo (Netherlands) Jean-Julien Rojer	2	4
6	(Kazakhstan) Aleksandr Nedovyesov (Pakistan) Aisam-ul-Haq Qureshi	6	6
(Lithuania) Ričardas Berankis (Ukraine) Denys Molchanov	2	2

Final
1	(Netherlands) Wesley Koolhof (United Kingdom) Neal Skupski	6	6
6	(Kazakhstan) Aleksandr Nedovyesov (Pakistan) Aisam-ul-Haq Qureshi	4	4

=== Top half ===
First round
(Netherlands) T Griekspoor (Italy) A Vavassori	6	6
(India) Y Bhambri (New Zealand) M Venus	4	4
(United States) M Giron (Germany) D Koepfer	6	6
Alt	(Slovakia) J Kovalík (Ukraine) S Stakhovsky	3	3
Alt	(Australia) R Hijikata (Australia) C O'Connell	6	3	[4]
Alt/PR	(Turkey) A Çelikbilek (Germany) Y Maden	3	6	[10]
(Mexico) H Hach Verdugo (Italy) S Travaglia	6	6
WC	(Slovakia) N Gombos (Slovakia) A Molčan	4	4

Second round
1	(Netherlands) W Koolhof (United Kingdom) N Skupski	6	3	[10]
(Netherlands) T Griekspoor (Italy) A Vavassori	3	6	[4]
(United States) M Giron (Germany) D Koepfer	6	3	[8]
7	(Monaco) R Arneodo (Germany) A Mies	4	6	[10]
3	(El Salvador) M Arévalo (Netherlands) J-J Rojer	6	6
Alt/PR	(Turkey) A Çelikbilek (Germany) Y Maden	3	2
(Mexico) H Hach Verdugo (Italy) S Travaglia	7	4	[10]
8	(Australia) M Reid (Australia) J Thompson	5	6	[5]

Quarterfinals
1	(Netherlands) W Koolhof (United Kingdom) N Skupski	w/o
7	(Monaco) R Arneodo (Germany) A Mies
3	(El Salvador) M Arévalo (Netherlands) J-J Rojer	6	6
(Mexico) H Hach Verdugo (Italy) S Travaglia	1	3

Semifinals
1	(Netherlands) W Koolhof (United Kingdom) N Skupski	6	6
3	(El Salvador) M Arévalo (Netherlands) J-J Rojer	2	4

=== Bottom half ===
First round
(Bulgaria) G Dimitrov (Belgium) D Goffin	2	6	[10]
(Netherlands) M Middelkoop (Netherlands) B van de Zandschulp	6	3	[6]
Alt	(Spain) J Munar (Spain) R Nadal	6	3	[10]
Alt	(Argentina) S Báez (Argentina) TM Etcheverry	3	6	[4]
(United States) M McDonald (United States) R Opelka	6^{4}	3
(New Zealand) M Daniell (United States) D Kudla	7^{7}	6
(Lithuania) R Berankis (Ukraine) D Molchanov	6	6
Alt	(Argentina) F Bagnis (Spain) B Zapata Miralles	3	4

Second round
6	(Kazakhstan) A Nedovyesov (Pakistan) A-u-H Qureshi	7^{7}	3	[10]
(Bulgaria) G Dimitrov (Belgium) D Goffin	6^{2}	6	[7]
Alt	(Spain) J Munar (Spain) R Nadal
4	(Kazakhstan) A Golubev (Croatia) F Škugor	w/o
5	(United Kingdom) D Inglot (United Kingdom) K Skupski	6	6^{4}	[4]
(New Zealand) M Daniell (United States) D Kudla	4	7^{7}	[10]
(Lithuania) R Berankis (Ukraine) D Molchanov	7^{7}	6^{5}	[10]
2	(South Africa) R Klaasen (Japan) B McLachlan	6^{2}	7^{7}	[8]

Quarterfinals
6	(Kazakhstan) A Nedovyesov (Pakistan) A-u-H Qureshi	6	7^{8}
4	(Kazakhstan) A Golubev (Croatia) F Škugor	3	6^{6}
(New Zealand) M Daniell (United States) D Kudla	6	6^{5}	[8]
(Lithuania) R Berankis (Ukraine) D Molchanov	2	7^{7}	[10]

Semifinals
6	(Kazakhstan) A Nedovyesov (Pakistan) A-u-H Qureshi	6	6
(Lithuania) R Berankis (Ukraine) D Molchanov	2	2
