= 2022 Melbourne Summer Set 2 – Doubles =

Doubles
- 2022 Melbourne Summer Set 2

Final
- Champions: (United States) Bernarda Pera (Czech Republic) Kateřina Siniaková
- Runners-up: (Egypt) Mayar Sherif (Czech Republic) Tereza Martincová
- Score: 6–2, 6–7^{(7–9)}, [10–5]

Events
Singles	Doubles
- Melbourne Summer Set

Bernarda Pera and Kateřina Siniaková defeated Mayar Sherif and Tereza Martincová in the final, 6–2, 6–7^{(7–9)}, [10–5], to win the doubles tennis title at the 2022 Melbourne Summer Set 2. The win earned Pera her first career WTA title.

This was the first edition of the tournament.

== Seeds ==
1. (Australia) Samantha Stosur / (China) Zhang Shuai (semifinals)
2. (United States) Bernarda Pera / (Czech Republic) Kateřina Siniaková (champions)
3. (Romania) Irina-Camelia Begu / (Serbia) Nina Stojanović (semifinals)
4. (Japan) Eri Hozumi / (Japan) Makoto Ninomiya (first round)

== Draw ==
Key

- Q = Qualifier
- WC = Wild card
- LL = Lucky loser
- Alt = Alternate
- ITF = ITF entry
- PR = Protected ranking
- SR = Special ranking
- SE = Special exempt
- JE = Junior exempt
- JR = Junior Accelerator Programme entrant
- CO = College Accelerator Programme entrant
- NG = Next Gen Accelerator Program entrant
- w/o = Walkover
- r = Retired
- d = Defaulted

=== Draw ===
First round
1	(Australia) S Stosur (China) S Zhang	6	6
(Russia) N Dzalamidze (Russia) K Rakhimova	3	4
PR	(Australia) M Adamczak (China) X Han	6	6
(Japan) N Hibino (Poland) A Rosolska	1	2
4	(Japan) E Hozumi (Japan) M Ninomiya	6	4	[8]
(Czech Republic) T Martincová (Egypt) M Sherif	4	6	[10]
(Switzerland) V Golubic (Australia) A Sharma	5	6	[12]
(Romania) I Bara (Georgia (country)) E Gorgodze	7	4	[10]
(Spain) A Bolsova (Poland) K Kawa	6	6
WC	(Australia) A Osborne (Australia) T Preston	2	2
Alt	(Brazil) B Haddad Maia (Spain) N Párrizas Díaz	6^{4}	4
3	(Romania) I-C Begu (Serbia) N Stojanović	7^{7}	6
(Netherlands) L Pattinama Kerkhove (Australia) Ar Rodionova	6	6
(Poland) K Piter (Czech Republic) R Voráčová	2	4
(Romania) S Halep (Romania) E-G Ruse	2	6^{5}
2	(United States) B Pera (Czech Republic) K Siniaková	6	7^{7}

Quarterfinals
1	(Australia) S Stosur (China) S Zhang	7	6
PR	(Australia) M Adamczak (China) X Han	5	2
(Czech Republic) T Martincová (Egypt) M Sherif	6	6
(Switzerland) V Golubic (Australia) A Sharma	2	4
(Spain) A Bolsova (Poland) K Kawa	6	0	[3]
3	(Romania) I-C Begu (Serbia) N Stojanović	4	6	[10]
(Netherlands) L Pattinama Kerkhove (Australia) Ar Rodionova	7^{7}	4	[5]
2	(United States) B Pera (Czech Republic) K Siniaková	6^{5}	6	[10]

Semifinals
1	(Australia) S Stosur (China) S Zhang	6^{4}	3
(Czech Republic) T Martincová (Egypt) M Sherif	7^{7}	6
3	(Romania) I-C Begu (Serbia) N Stojanović	7^{9}	1	[5]
2	(United States) B Pera (Czech Republic) K Siniaková	6^{7}	6	[10]

Final
(Czech Republic) T Martincová (Egypt) M Sherif	2	7^{9}	[5]
2	(United States) B Pera (Czech Republic) K Siniaková	6	6^{7}	[10]

== See also ==
- 2022 Melbourne Summer Set 1 – Women's doubles
