= 2022 Melbourne Summer Set 1 – Women's doubles =

Women's doubles
- 2022 Melbourne Summer Set 1

Final
- Champions: (United States) Asia Muhammad (United States) Jessica Pegula
- Runners-up: (Italy) Sara Errani (Italy) Jasmine Paolini
- Score: 6–3, 6–1

Events
Singles	men	women
Doubles	men	women
Melbourne Summer Set	· 2022 →

Asia Muhammad and Jessica Pegula defeated Sara Errani and Jasmine Paolini in the final, 6–3, 6–1, to win the women's doubles tennis title at the 2022 Melbourne Summer Set 1. This was the first edition of the tournament.

== Seeds ==
1. (Russia) Veronika Kudermetova / (Belgium) Elise Mertens (withdrew)
2. (United States) Asia Muhammad / (United States) Jessica Pegula (champions)
3. (Slovakia) Viktória Kužmová / (Russia) Vera Zvonareva (semifinals)
4. (Belgium) Greet Minnen / (Australia) Ellen Perez (first round)
5. (Japan) Miyu Kato / (United States) Sabrina Santamaria (first round)

== Draw ==
=== Key ===
- Q = Qualifier
- WC = Wild card
- LL = Lucky loser
- Alt = Alternate
- SE = Special exempt
- PR = Protected ranking
- ITF = ITF entry
- JE = Junior exempt
- w/o = Walkover
- r = Retired
- d = Defaulted
- SR = Special ranking

=== Draw ===
First round
5	(Japan) M Kato (United States) S Santamaria	6	3	[9]
(United States) K Christian (Belarus) L Marozava	4	6	[11]
WC	(Australia) G Da Silva-Fick (Australia) O Tjandramulia	4	2
(Italy) S Errani (Italy) J Paolini	6	6
4	(Belgium) G Minnen (Australia) E Perez	3	4
WC	(Australia) D Aiava (Australia) L Cabrera	6	6
(Belgium) K Flipkens (Spain) S Sorribes Tormo	6^{5}	7^{8}	[10]
Alt	(United States) D Krawczyk (United States) C McHale	7^{7}	6^{6}	[3]
(Germany) V Heisen (United States) I Neel	4	2
(Russia) D Kasatkina (Russia) L Samsonova	6	6
Alt	(Belarus) A Sasnovich (Latvia) A Sevastova	7^{14}	2	[6]
3	(Slovakia) V Kužmová (Russia) V Zvonareva	6^{12}	6	[10]
(Germany) J Lohoff (Belgium) K Zimmermann	0	7^{7}	[10]
(Hungary) A Bondár (Serbia) A Krunić	6	6^{3}	[7]
(Denmark) C Tauson (Belgium) A Van Uytvanck	3	2
2	(United States) A Muhammad (United States) J Pegula	6	6

Quarterfinals
(United States) K Christian (Belarus) L Marozava	2	3
(Italy) S Errani (Italy) J Paolini	6	6
WC	(Australia) D Aiava (Australia) L Cabrera	7	1	[10]
(Belgium) K Flipkens (Spain) S Sorribes Tormo	5	6	[6]
(Russia) D Kasatkina (Russia) L Samsonova
3	(Slovakia) V Kužmová (Russia) V Zvonareva	w/o
(Germany) J Lohoff (Belgium) K Zimmermann	0	5
2	(United States) A Muhammad (United States) J Pegula	6	7

Semifinals
(Italy) S Errani (Italy) J Paolini	6	6
WC	(Australia) D Aiava (Australia) L Cabrera	2	4
3	(Slovakia) V Kužmová (Russia) V Zvonareva	3	7^{7}	[6]
2	(United States) A Muhammad (United States) J Pegula	6	6^{2}	[10]

Final
(Italy) S Errani (Italy) J Paolini	3	1
2	(United States) A Muhammad (United States) J Pegula	6	6

== See also ==
- 2022 Melbourne Summer Set 2 – Doubles
