= 2022 Melbourne Summer Set 1 =

- Date: 4–9 January
- Edition: 1st
- Category: ATP Tour 250; WTA 250
- Draw: 28S / 24D (ATP); 32S / 16D (WTA)
- Prize money: $521,000 (ATP) $239,477 (WTA)
- Surface: Hard / outdoor
- Location: Melbourne, Australia

Champions

Men's singles
- (Spain) Rafael Nadal

Women's singles
- (Romania) Simona Halep

Men's doubles
- (Netherlands) Wesley Koolhof / (United Kingdom) Neal Skupski

Women's doubles
- (United States) Asia Muhammad / (United States) Jessica Pegula
- Melbourne Summer Set

The 2022 Melbourne Summer Set 1 was one of two tournaments of the Melbourne Summer Set. The Melbourne Summer Set 1 featured an ATP Tour 250 tournament and a WTA 250 tournament, both played on hardcourts and as part of the 2022 WTA Tour.

Rafael Nadal won the men's singles title to earn his 89th career ATP title and his first in Australia since 2009. Simona Halep won the women's singles title to earn her 23rd career WTA title and first title in Australia.

== Champions ==
=== Men's singles ===
- (Spain) Rafael Nadal def. (United States) Maxime Cressy 7–6^{(8–6)}, 6–3

=== Women's singles ===
- (Romania) Simona Halep def. (Russia) Veronika Kudermetova 6–2, 6–3

=== Men's doubles ===
- (Netherlands) Wesley Koolhof / (United Kingdom) Neal Skupski def. (Kazakhstan) Aleksandr Nedovyesov / (Pakistan) Aisam-ul-Haq Qureshi 6–4, 6–4

=== Women's doubles ===
- (United States) Asia Muhammad / (United States) Jessica Pegula def. (Italy) Sara Errani / (Italy) Jasmine Paolini 6–3, 6–1

== Points and prize money ==
=== Point distribution ===
Event	W	F	SF	QF	Round of 16	Round of 32	Q	Q2	Q1
Men's singles	250	150	90	45	20	0	12	6	0
Men's doubles*	250	150	90	45	20	0	—N/a	—N/a	—N/a
Women's singles	280	180	110	60	30	1	18	12	1
Women's doubles*	280	180	110	60	1	—N/a	—N/a	—N/a	—N/a

_{*per team}

=== Prize money ===
Event	W	F	SF	QF	Round of 16	Round of 32	Q2	Q1
Men's singles	$87,370	$48,365	$27,220	$15,490	$8,890	$5,200	$2,540	$1,320
Men's doubles *	$23,370	$13,210	$7,630	$4,320	$2,540	$1,520	—N/a	—N/a
Women's singles	$31,000	$18,037	$10,100	$5,800	$3,675	$2,675	$1,950	$1,270
Women's doubles*	$10,800	$6,300	$3,800	$2,300	$1,750	—N/a	—N/a	—N/a

== ATP singles main draw entrants ==
=== Seeds ===
Country	Player	Rank^{1}	Seed
ESP	Rafael Nadal	6	1
USA	Reilly Opelka	26	2
BUL	Grigor Dimitrov	28	3
BEL	David Goffin	39	4
FRA	Benoît Paire	46	5
~~BLR~~	~~Ilya Ivashka~~	~~48~~	~~6~~
GER	Dominik Koepfer	54	7
USA	Mackenzie McDonald	55	8

- ^{1} Rankings are as of 27 December 2021

=== Other entrants ===
The following players received wildcards into the singles main draw:

- ~~(Australia) Nick Kyrgios~~
- (United Kingdom) Andy Murray
- (Australia) Christopher O'Connell

The following player received entry as an alternate:

- (Finland) Emil Ruusuvuori

The following players received entry from the qualifying draw:

- (Lithuania) Ričardas Berankis
- (United States) Maxime Cressy
- (Australia) Rinky Hijikata
- (Italy) Andreas Seppi

The following players received entry as lucky losers:

- (Argentina) Sebastián Báez
- (Switzerland) Henri Laaksonen

=== Withdrawals ===
Before the tournament

- (Kazakhstan) Alexander Bublik → replaced by (Germany) Peter Gojowczyk
- (South Africa) Lloyd Harris → replaced by (Slovakia) Alex Molčan
- (Belarus) Ilya Ivashka → replaced by (Argentina) Sebastián Báez
- (Australia) Nick Kyrgios → replaced by (Switzerland) Henri Laaksonen
- (Japan) Kei Nishikori → replaced by (Finland) Emil Ruusuvuori

During the tournament

- (Netherlands) Tallon Griekspoor

=== Retirements ===
- (France) Benoît Paire

== ATP doubles main-draw entrants ==
=== Seeds ===
Country	Player	Country	Player	Rank^{1}	Seed
NED	Wesley Koolhof	GBR	Neal Skupski	41	1
RSA	Raven Klaasen	JPN	Ben McLachlan	63	2
ESA	Marcelo Arévalo	NED	Jean-Julien Rojer	69	3
KAZ	Andrey Golubev	CRO	Franko Škugor	81	4
GBR	Dominic Inglot	GBR	Ken Skupski	116	5
KAZ	Aleksandr Nedovyesov	PAK	Aisam-ul-Haq Qureshi	122	6
MON	Romain Arneodo	GER	Andreas Mies	129	7
AUS	Matt Reid	AUS	Jordan Thompson	273	8

- ^{1} Rankings are as of 27 December 2021

=== Other entrants ===
The following pairs received wildcards into the doubles main draw:

- (Slovakia) Norbert Gombos / (Slovakia) Alex Molčan
- ~~(Australia) Marc Polmans / (Australia) Alexei Popyrin~~

The following pair received entry using a protected ranking:

- (Turkey) Altuğ Çelikbilek / (Germany) Yannick Maden

The following pairs received entry as alternates:

- (Argentina) Sebastián Báez / (Argentina) Tomás Martín Etcheverry
- (Argentina) Facundo Bagnis / (Spain) Bernabé Zapata Miralles
- (Turkey) Altuğ Çelikbilek / (Germany) Yannick Maden
- (Australia) Rinky Hijikata / (Australia) Christopher O'Connell
- (Slovakia) Jozef Kovalík / (Ukraine) Sergiy Stakhovsky
- (Spain) Jaume Munar / (Spain) Rafael Nadal

=== Withdrawals ===
Before the tournament

- (Monaco) Romain Arneodo / (France) Benoît Paire → replaced by (Spain) Jaume Munar / (Spain) Rafael Nadal
- (Kazakhstan) Alexander Bublik / (United States) Mackenzie McDonald → replaced by (United States) Mackenzie McDonald / (United States) Reilly Opelka
- (Italy) Marco Cecchinato / (Italy) Andreas Seppi → replaced by (Turkey) Altuğ Çelikbilek / (Germany) Yannick Maden
- (New Zealand) Marcus Daniell / (Brazil) Marcelo Demoliner → replaced by (New Zealand) Marcus Daniell / (United States) Denis Kudla
- (South Africa) Lloyd Harris / (Australia) Alexei Popyrin → replaced by (Australia) Rinky Hijikata / (Australia) Christopher O'Connell
- (Belarus) Ilya Ivashka / (Belarus) Andrei Vasilevski → replaced by (Slovakia) Jozef Kovalík / (Ukraine) Sergiy Stakhovsky
- (France) Fabrice Martin / (Germany) Andreas Mies → replaced by (Monaco) Romain Arneodo / (Germany) Andreas Mies
- (France) Adrian Mannarino / (Monaco) Hugo Nys → replaced by (Argentina) Facundo Bagnis / (Spain) Bernabé Zapata Miralles
- (Ukraine) Denys Molchanov / (Spain) David Vega Hernández → replaced by (Lithuania) Ričardas Berankis / (Ukraine) Denys Molchanov
- (Australia) Marc Polmans / (Australia) Alexei Popyrin → replaced by (Argentina) Sebastián Báez / (Argentina) Tomás Martín Etcheverry

During the tournament

- (Monaco) Romain Arneodo / (Germany) Andreas Mies
- (Spain) Jaume Munar / (Spain) Rafael Nadal

== WTA singles main-draw entrants ==
=== Seeds ===
Country	Player	Rank^{1}	Seed
JPN	Naomi Osaka	13	1
ROU	Simona Halep	20	2
RUS	Veronika Kudermetova	31	3
~~ITA~~	~~Camila Giorgi~~	~~33~~	~~4~~
RUS	Liudmila Samsonova	38	5
SUI	Viktorija Golubic	43	6
CZE	Tereza Martincová	48	7
CZE	Kateřina Siniaková	49	8
USA	Alison Riske	51	9

- ^{1} Rankings as of 27 December 2021

=== Other entrants ===
The following players received wildcards into the singles main draw:

- (Australia) Seone Mendez
- (Australia) Lizette Cabrera
- (Australia) Arina Rodionova

The following player received entry as an alternate:

- (United States) Lauren Davis

The following players received entry from the qualifying draw:

- (Australia) Destanee Aiava
- (Hungary) Anna Bondár
- (Japan) Nao Hibino
- (Slovakia) Viktória Kužmová
- (Netherlands) Lesley Pattinama Kerkhove
- (China) Zheng Qinwen

The following player received entry as a lucky loser:

- (Japan) Mai Hontama

=== Withdrawals ===
Before the tournament

- (Italy) Camila Giorgi → replaced by (United States) Lauren Davis
- (Colombia) Camila Osorio → replaced by (Japan) Mai Hontama
- (United Kingdom) Emma Raducanu → replaced by (Romania) Elena-Gabriela Ruse
- (Switzerland) Jil Teichmann → replaced by (Belgium) Maryna Zanevska

During the tournament

- (Japan) Naomi Osaka

== WTA doubles main draw entrants ==
=== Seeds ===
Country	Player	Country	Player	Rank^{1}	Seed
~~RUS~~	~~Veronika Kudermetova~~	~~BEL~~	~~Elise Mertens~~	~~18~~	~~1~~
USA	Asia Muhammad	USA	Jessica Pegula	95	2
SVK	Viktória Kužmová	RUS	Vera Zvonareva	102	3
BEL	Greet Minnen	AUS	Ellen Perez	119	4
JPN	Miyu Kato	USA	Sabrina Santamaria	138	5

- ^{1} Rankings as of 27 December 2021

=== Other entrants ===
The following pairs received wildcards into the doubles main draw:

- (Australia) Destanee Aiava / (Australia) Lizette Cabrera
- (Australia) Gabriella Da Silva-Fick / (Australia) Olivia Tjandramulia

The following pairs received entry as alternates into the doubles main draw:

- (United States) Desirae Krawczyk / (United States) Christina McHale
- (Belarus) Aliaksandra Sasnovich / (Latvia) Anastasija Sevastova

=== Withdrawals ===
Before the tournament

- (Russia) Veronika Kudermetova / (Belgium) Elise Mertens → replaced by (United States) Desirae Krawczyk / (United States) Christina McHale
- (France) Elixane Lechemia / (United States) Ingrid Neel → replaced by (Germany) Vivian Heisen / (United States) Ingrid Neel
- (China) Wang Xinyu / (China) Zheng Saisai → replaced by (Belarus) Aliaksandra Sasnovich / (Latvia) Anastasija Sevastova

During the tournament

- (Russia) Daria Kasatkina / (Russia) Liudmila Samsonova

== See also ==
- 2022 Melbourne Summer Set 2
