= 2020 Qatar Total Open =

- Date: 23–29 February
- Edition: 18th
- Category: Premier 5
- Draw: 56S / 28D
- Surface: Hard
- Location: Doha, Qatar
- Venue: Khalifa International Tennis and Squash Complex

Champions

Singles
- (Belarus) Aryna Sabalenka

Doubles
- (Chinese Taipei) Hsieh Su-wei / (Czech Republic) Barbora Strýcová
| ← 2019 · | Qatar Open | · 2021 → |

The 2020 Qatar Total Open was a professional women's tennis tournament played on hard courts. It was the 18th edition of the event and a WTA Premier 5 tournament on the 2020 WTA Tour. It took place at the International Tennis and Squash complex in Doha, Qatar between 23 and 29 February 2020.

== Points and prize money ==
=== Point distribution ===
| Event | W | F | SF | QF | Round of 16 | Round of 32 | Round of 56 | Q | Q2 | Q1 |
| Singles | 900 | 585 | 350 | 190 | 105 | 60 | 1 | 30 | 20 | 1 |
| Doubles | 900 | 585 | 350 | 190 | 105 | 1 | — | — | — | — |

=== Prize money ===
| Event | W | F | SF | QF | Round of 16 | Round of 32 | Round of 56 | Q2 | Q1 |
| Singles | $605,000 | $304,005 | $151,515 | $69,775 | $34,500 | $17,800 | $9,100 | $5,080 | $2,620 |
| Doubles* | $172,000 | $87,000 | $43,500 | $21,700 | $11,000 | $5,500 | — | — | — |

_{*per team}

== Singles main-draw entrants ==
=== Seeds ===
| Country | Player | Rank^{1} | Seed |
|---|---|---|---|
| AUS | Ashleigh Barty | 1 | 1 |
| ~~ROU~~ | ~~Simona Halep~~ | ~~2~~ | ~~2~~ |
| CZE | Karolína Plíšková | 3 | 3 |
| SUI | Belinda Bencic | 4 | 4 |
| UKR | Elina Svitolina | 6 | 5 |
| USA | Sofia Kenin | 7 | 6 |
| NED | Kiki Bertens | 8 | 7 |
| CZE | Petra Kvitová | 11 | 8 |
| BLR | Aryna Sabalenka | 13 | 9 |
| CRO | Petra Martić | 15 | 10 |
| ESP | Garbiñe Muguruza | 16 | 11 |
| CZE | Markéta Vondroušová | 17 | 12 |
| USA | Alison Riske | 18 | 13 |
| KAZ | Elena Rybakina | 19 | 14 |
| GRE | Maria Sakkari | 21 | 15 |
| BEL | Elise Mertens | 22 | 16 |
| CRO | Donna Vekić | 23 | 17 |

- ^{1} Rankings as of February 17, 2020

=== Other entrants ===
The following players received wildcards into the singles main draw:

- (Turkey) Çağla Büyükakçay
- (Romania) Sorana Cîrstea
- (Tunisia) Ons Jabeur
- (Russia) Vera Zvonareva

The following players received entry using a protected ranking into the singles main draw:

- (Kazakhstan) Yaroslava Shvedova

The following players received entry from the qualifying draw:

- (Belgium) Kirsten Flipkens
- (Australia) Priscilla Hon
- (Russia) Daria Kasatkina
- (Czech Republic) Tereza Martincová
- (United States) Bernarda Pera
- (Germany) Laura Siegemund
- (Czech Republic) Kateřina Siniaková
- (Switzerland) Jil Teichmann

The following players received entry as lucky losers:

- (Hungary) Tímea Babos
- (Japan) Misaki Doi

=== Withdrawals ===
Before the tournament

- (Canada) Bianca Andreescu → replaced by (United States) Jennifer Brady
- (United States) Catherine Bellis → replaced by (Slovenia) Polona Hercog
- (United States) Danielle Collins → replaced by (Russia) Svetlana Kuznetsova
- (Romania) Simona Halep → replaced by (Japan) Misaki Doi
- (Germany) Angelique Kerber → replaced by (Spain) Carla Suárez Navarro
- (United Kingdom) Johanna Konta → replaced by (Australia) Ajla Tomljanović
- (Russia) Anastasia Pavlyuchenkova → replaced by (Hungary) Tímea Babos

During the tournament

- (United States) Amanda Anisimova (gastrointestinal illness)
- (Kazakhstan) Elena Rybakina (left leg injury)

== Doubles main-draw entrants ==
=== Seeds ===
| Country | Player | Country | Player | Rank^{1} | Seed |
|---|---|---|---|---|---|
| TPE | Hsieh Su-wei | CZE | Barbora Strýcová | 3 | 1 |
| HUN | Tímea Babos | FRA | Kristina Mladenovic | 7 | 2 |
| BEL | Elise Mertens | BLR | Aryna Sabalenka | 11 | 3 |
| CZE | Barbora Krejčíková | CZE | Kateřina Siniaková | 19 | 4 |
| USA | Nicole Melichar | CHN | Xu Yifan | 26 | 5 |
| CAN | Gabriela Dabrowski | LAT | Jeļena Ostapenko | 26 | 6 |
| TPE | Chan Hao-ching | TPE | Latisha Chan | 26 | 7 |
| AUS | Ashleigh Barty | NED | Demi Schuurs | 27 | 8 |

- Rankings are as of February 17, 2020.

=== Other entrants ===
The following pairs received wildcards into the doubles main draw:

- (Turkey) Çağla Büyükakçay / (Germany) Laura Siegemund
- (France) Caroline Garcia / (India) Sania Mirza
- (Russia) Alla Kudryavtseva / (Slovenia) Katarina Srebotnik

=== Withdrawals ===
During the tournament

- (Chinese Taipei) Latisha Chan (dizziness)

== Finals ==
=== Singles ===
- (Belarus) Aryna Sabalenka def. (Czech Republic) Petra Kvitová, 6–3, 6–3

=== Doubles ===
- (Chinese Taipei) Hsieh Su-wei / (Czech Republic) Barbora Strýcová def. (Canada) Gabriela Dabrowski / (Latvia) Jeļena Ostapenko, 6–2, 5–7, [10–2]
