= 2020 Qatar Total Open – Doubles =

Doubles
- 2020 Qatar Total Open

Final
- Champions: (Chinese Taipei) Hsieh Su-wei (Czech Republic) Barbora Strýcová
- Runners-up: (Canada) Gabriela Dabrowski (Latvia) Jeļena Ostapenko
- Score: 6–2, 5–7, [10–2]

Events
Singles	Doubles
← 2019 ·	Qatar Total Open	· 2021 →

Chan Hao-ching and Latisha Chan were the defending champions, but the team withdrew before their second round match.

Hsieh Su-wei and Barbora Strýcová won the title, defeating Gabriela Dabrowski and Jeļena Ostapenko in the final, 6–2, 5–7, [10–2]. Hsieh also regained the WTA no. 1 doubles ranking from Kristina Mladenovic.

== Seeds ==
The top four seeds received a bye into the second round.

1. (Chinese Taipei) Hsieh Su-wei / (Czech Republic) Barbora Strýcová (champions)
2. (Hungary) Tímea Babos / (France) Kristina Mladenovic (semifinals)
3. (Belgium) Elise Mertens / (Belarus) Aryna Sabalenka (quarterfinals)
4. (Czech Republic) Barbora Krejčíková / (Czech Republic) Kateřina Siniaková (semifinals)
5. (United States) Nicole Melichar / (China) Xu Yifan (quarterfinals)
6. (Canada) Gabriela Dabrowski / (Latvia) Jeļena Ostapenko (final)
7. (Chinese Taipei) Chan Hao-ching / (Chinese Taipei) Latisha Chan (second round, withdrew)
8. (Australia) Ashleigh Barty / (Netherlands) Demi Schuurs (first round)

== Draw ==
=== Key ===
- Q = Qualifier
- WC = Wild card
- LL = Lucky loser
- Alt = Alternate
- SE = Special exempt
- PR = Protected ranking
- ITF = ITF entry
- JE = Junior exempt
- w/o = Walkover
- r = Retired
- d = Defaulted
- SR = Special ranking

=== Finals ===
Semifinals
1	(Chinese Taipei) Hsieh Su-wei (Czech Republic) Barbora Strýcová	6	4	[12]
4	(Czech Republic) Barbora Krejčíková (Czech Republic) Kateřina Siniaková	4	6	[10]
6	(Canada) Gabriela Dabrowski (Latvia) Jeļena Ostapenko	6	1	[10]
2	(Hungary) Tímea Babos (France) Kristina Mladenovic	4	6	[7]

Final
1	(Chinese Taipei) Hsieh Su-wei (Czech Republic) Barbora Strýcová	6	5	[10]
6	(Canada) Gabriela Dabrowski (Latvia) Jeļena Ostapenko	2	7	[2]

=== Top half ===
First round
(Ukraine) L Kichenok (Ukraine) N Kichenok	7	1	[10]
(Netherlands) K Bertens (Germany) J Görges	5	6	[3]
(China) X Han (China) S Peng	6	6
(Poland) M Linette (Romania) PM Țig	3	2
(Switzerland) B Bencic (United States) S Kenin	6	7^{7}
8	(Australia) A Barty (Netherlands) D Schuurs	4	6^{5}
(United States) H Carter (Brazil) L Stefani	2	6	[7]
(Japan) M Ninomiya (China) Z Yang	6	3	[10]
WC	(Turkey) Ç Büyükakçay (Germany) L Siegemund	6	7
WC	(France) C Garcia (India) S Mirza	4	5
(Japan) S Aoyama (Japan) E Shibahara	3	3
7	(Chinese Taipei) H-c Chan (Chinese Taipei) L Chan	6	6

Second round
1	(Chinese Taipei) S-w Hsieh (Czech Republic) B Strýcová	6	6
(Ukraine) L Kichenok (Ukraine) N Kichenok	2	2
(China) X Han (China) S Peng	6^{3}	1
(Switzerland) B Bencic (United States) S Kenin	7^{7}	6
4	(Czech Republic) B Krejčíková (Czech Republic) K Siniaková	6	6
(Japan) M Ninomiya (China) Z Yang	1	3
WC	(Turkey) Ç Büyükakçay (Germany) L Siegemund	w/o
7	(Chinese Taipei) H-c Chan (Chinese Taipei) L Chan

Quarterfinals
1	(Chinese Taipei) S-w Hsieh (Czech Republic) B Strýcová	6	6
(Switzerland) B Bencic (United States) S Kenin	4	2
4	(Czech Republic) B Krejčíková (Czech Republic) K Siniaková	6	6
WC	(Turkey) Ç Büyükakçay (Germany) L Siegemund	1	2

Semifinals
1	(Chinese Taipei) S-w Hsieh (Czech Republic) B Strýcová	6	4	[12]
4	(Czech Republic) B Krejčíková (Czech Republic) K Siniaková	4	6	[10]

=== Bottom half ===
First round
6	(Canada) G Dabrowski (Latvia) J Ostapenko	6	6
(United States) K Christian (Georgia (country)) O Kalashnikova	2	2
PR	(Croatia) D Jurak (Kazakhstan) Y Shvedova	7	3	[7]
(Russia) E Alexandrova (Russia) A Blinkova	5	6	[10]
(Ukraine) E Svitolina (Ukraine) D Yastremska	3	3
(Belgium) K Flipkens (United States) B Mattek-Sands	6	6
5	(United States) N Melichar (China) Y Xu	6	7^{7}
(Chile) A Guarachi (Poland) A Rosolska	3	6^{2}
(China) Y Duan (Russia) V Kudermetova	3	6	[10]
WC	(Russia) A Kudryavtseva (Slovenia) K Srebotnik	6	3	[4]
(Czech Republic) L Hradecká (Slovenia) A Klepač	3	6	[10]
(China) S Zhang (China) S Zheng	6	3	[7]

Second round
6	(Canada) G Dabrowski (Latvia) J Ostapenko	6	6
(Russia) E Alexandrova (Russia) A Blinkova	2	3
(Belgium) K Flipkens (United States) B Mattek-Sands	7^{8}	2	[7]
3	(Belgium) E Mertens (Belarus) A Sabalenka	6^{6}	6	[10]
5	(United States) N Melichar (China) Y Xu	6	1	[10]
(China) Y Duan (Russia) V Kudermetova	4	6	[5]
(Czech Republic) L Hradecká (Slovenia) A Klepač	6	3	[6]
2	(Hungary) T Babos (France) K Mladenovic	4	6	[10]

Quarterfinals
6	(Canada) G Dabrowski (Latvia) J Ostapenko	4	6	[10]
3	(Belgium) E Mertens (Belarus) A Sabalenka	6	1	[4]
5	(United States) N Melichar (China) Y Xu	3	3
2	(Hungary) T Babos (France) K Mladenovic	6	6

Semifinals
6	(Canada) G Dabrowski (Latvia) J Ostapenko	6	1	[10]
2	(Hungary) T Babos (France) K Mladenovic	4	6	[7]
