= 2022 Melbourne Summer Set 2 – Singles =

Singles
- 2022 Melbourne Summer Set 2

Final
- Champion: (United States) Amanda Anisimova
- Runner-up: (Belarus) Aliaksandra Sasnovich
- Score: 7–5, 1–6, 6–4

Details
- Draw: 32 (6 Q / 3 WC )
- Seeds: 8

Events
Singles	Doubles
← 2022 ·	Melbourne Summer Set

Amanda Anisimova defeated Aliaksandra Sasnovich in the final, 7–5, 1–6, 6–4 to win the singles title at the 2022 Melbourne Summer Set 2.

This was the first edition of the tournament.

== Seeds ==
1. (United States) Jessica Pegula (first round)
2. (Belgium) Elise Mertens (withdrew)
3. (Russia) Daria Kasatkina (semifinals)
4. (Spain) Sara Sorribes Tormo (second round)
5. (Romania) Sorana Cîrstea (second round)
6. (Denmark) Clara Tauson (quarterfinals, retired)
7. (United States) Ann Li (semifinals)
8. (Ukraine) Marta Kostyuk (first round)

== Draw ==
=== Key ===
- Q = Qualifier
- WC = Wild card
- LL = Lucky loser
- Alt = Alternate
- SE = Special exempt
- PR = Protected ranking
- ITF = ITF entry
- JE = Junior exempt
- w/o = Walkover
- r = Retired
- d = Defaulted
- SR = Special ranking

=== Finals ===
Semifinals
(United States) Amanda Anisimova	6	6
3	(Russia) Daria Kasatkina	2	0
7	(United States) Ann Li	6^{4}	6	3
Q	(Belarus) Aliaksandra Sasnovich	7^{7}	2	6

Final
(United States) Amanda Anisimova	7	1	6
Q	(Belarus) Aliaksandra Sasnovich	5	6	4

=== Top half ===
First round
1	(United States) J Pegula	6^{6}	3
(Romania) I-C Begu	7^{8}	6
(Italy) J Paolini	2	6	6
(Slovakia) AK Schmiedlová	6	3	4
(Belgium) A Van Uytvanck	6^{5}	6	5
(United States) A Anisimova	7^{7}	1	7
(Russia) V Gracheva	0	0
5	(Romania) S Cîrstea	6	6
3	(Russia) D Kasatkina	6	3
Q	(Russia) A Kalinskaya	1	0^{r}
(United States) M Keys	6	7^{7}
Q	(United Kingdom) H Dart	3	6^{2}
(Spain) N Párrizas Díaz	6	6
WC	(Australia) E Perez	0	3
Q	(United States) C Liu	4	6	6
8	(Ukraine) M Kostyuk	6	4	3

Second round
(Romania) I-C Begu	3	6	6
(Italy) J Paolini	6	2	3
(United States) A Anisimova	6	6
5	(Romania) S Cîrstea	4	1
3	(Russia) D Kasatkina	7^{7}	2	6
(United States) M Keys	6^{4}	6	3
(Spain) N Párrizas Díaz	3	7	6
Q	(United States) C Liu	6	5	1

Quarterfinals
(Romania) I-C Begu	6	3	2
(United States) A Anisimova	2	6	6
3	(Russia) D Kasatkina	7	6
(Spain) N Párrizas Díaz	5	1

Semifinals
(United States) A Anisimova	6	6
3	(Russia) D Kasatkina	2	0

=== Bottom half ===
First round
7	(United States) A Li	6	6
(Egypt) M Sherif	2	0
(Latvia) A Sevastova	6	6
(France) C Garcia	4	4
(Belgium) G Minnen	5	5
Q	(Russia) K Rakhimova	7	7
(Brazil) B Haddad Maia	4	7	3
4	(Spain) S Sorribes Tormo	6	5	6
6	(Denmark) C Tauson	7	6
(Ukraine) A Kalinina	5	3
Q	(China) L Zhu	7^{7}	7^{7}
WC	(Australia) S Stosur	6^{5}	6^{5}
(Sweden) R Peterson	6	3	6
WC	(Australia) A Sharma	1	6	2
Q	(Belarus) A Sasnovich	6	6
LL	(China) Xin Wang	4	2

Second round
7	(United States) A Li	6	6
(Latvia) A Sevastova	1	4
Q	(Russia) K Rakhimova	7^{7}	6
4	(Spain) S Sorribes Tormo	6^{3}	4
6	(Denmark) C Tauson	6	6
Q	(China) L Zhu	1	0
(Sweden) R Peterson	2	4
Q	(Belarus) A Sasnovich	6	6

Quarterfinals
7	(United States) A Li	6	7
Q	(Russia) K Rakhimova	1	5
6	(Denmark) C Tauson	3	0^{r}
Q	(Belarus) A Sasnovich	6	2

Semifinals
7	(United States) A Li	6^{4}	6	3
Q	(Belarus) A Sasnovich	7^{7}	2	6

== Qualifying ==
=== Seeds ===
1. (France) Océane Dodin (first round)
2. (United States) Claire Liu (qualified)
3. (Hungary) Panna Udvardy (first round)
4. (China) Wang Xinyu (qualifying competition; Lucky loser)
5. (France) Fiona Ferro (first round)
6. (Belarus) Aliaksandra Sasnovich (qualified)
7. (Russia) Anna Kalinskaya (qualified)
8. (China) Zhu Lin (qualified)
9. (Serbia) Nina Stojanović (qualifying competition)
10. (Ukraine) Lesia Tsurenko (qualifying competition)
11. (Russia) Kamilla Rakhimova (qualified)
12. (United Kingdom) Harriet Dart (qualified)

=== Qualifiers ===
1. (Russia) Anna Kalinskaya
2. (United States) Claire Liu
3. (Russia) Kamilla Rakhimova
4. (United Kingdom) Harriet Dart
5. (China) Zhu Lin
6. (Belarus) Aliaksandra Sasnovich

=== Lucky loser ===
1. (China) Wang Xinyu

=== Qualifying draw ===
==== First qualifier ====
First round
1	(France) Océane Dodin	5	7^{7}	5
(Romania) Irina Bara	7	6^{3}	7
(United States) Christina McHale	5	1
7	(Russia) Anna Kalinskaya	7	6

Qualifying competition
(Romania) Irina Bara	5	2
7	(Russia) Anna Kalinskaya	7	6

==== Second qualifier ====
First round
2	(United States) Claire Liu	6	6
(France) Amandine Hesse	3	3
(Georgia (country)) Ekaterine Gorgodze	2	4
9	(Serbia) Nina Stojanović	6	6

Qualifying competition
2	(United States) Claire Liu	5	6	6
9	(Serbia) Nina Stojanović	7	2	3

==== Third qualifier ====
First round
3	(Hungary) Panna Udvardy	3	2
(United States) Hailey Baptiste	6	6
(Serbia) Aleksandra Krunić	3	4
11	(Russia) Kamilla Rakhimova	6	6

Qualifying competition
(United States) Hailey Baptiste	4	0
11	(Russia) Kamilla Rakhimova	6	6

==== Fourth qualifier ====
First round
4	(China) Wang Xinyu	6	6
WC	(Australia) Alicia Smith	2	2
(Ukraine) Daria Snigur	4	2
12	(United Kingdom) Harriet Dart	6	6

Qualifying competition
4	(China) Wang Xinyu	6	6^{5}	4
12	(United Kingdom) Harriet Dart	1	7^{7}	6

==== Fifth qualifier ====
First round
5	(France) Fiona Ferro	3	6^{6}
(Spain) Aliona Bolsova	6	7^{8}
WC	(Australia) Gabriella Da Silva-Fick	0	0
8	(China) Zhu Lin	6	6

Qualifying competition
(Spain) Aliona Bolsova	2	2
8	(China) Zhu Lin	6	6

==== Sixth qualifier ====
First round
6	(Belarus) Aliaksandra Sasnovich	6	6
WC	(Australia) Olivia Tjandramulia	2	3
WC	(Australia) Tina Nadine Smith	0	0
10	(Ukraine) Lesia Tsurenko	6	6

Qualifying competition
6	(Belarus) Aliaksandra Sasnovich	7	6
10	(Ukraine) Lesia Tsurenko	5	1

== See also ==
- 2022 Melbourne Summer Set 1 – Women's singles
