= 2020 Qatar Total Open – Singles =

Singles
- 2020 Qatar Total Open

Final
- Champion: (Belarus) Aryna Sabalenka
- Runner-up: (Czech Republic) Petra Kvitová
- Score: 6–3, 6–3

Details
- Draw: 56 (8 Q / 4 WC )
- Seeds: 16

Events
Singles	Doubles
- Qatar Total Open

Aryna Sabalenka defeated Petra Kvitová in the final, 6–3, 6–3 to win the singles tennis title at the 2020 WTA Qatar Open.

Elise Mertens was the defending champion, but lost in the second round to Yulia Putintseva.

== Seeds ==
The top eight seeds who played received a bye into the second round.

1. (Australia) Ashleigh Barty (semifinals)
2. (Romania) Simona Halep (withdrew)
3. (Czech Republic) Karolína Plíšková (third round)
4. (Switzerland) Belinda Bencic (quarterfinals)
5. (Ukraine) Elina Svitolina (second round)
6. (United States) Sofia Kenin (second round)
7. (Netherlands) Kiki Bertens (third round)
8. (Czech Republic) Petra Kvitová (final)
9. (Belarus) Aryna Sabalenka (champion)

10. (Croatia) Petra Martić (first round)
11. (Spain) Garbiñe Muguruza (quarterfinals)
12. (Czech Republic) Markéta Vondroušová (first round)
13. (United States) Alison Riske (first round)
14. (Kazakhstan) Elena Rybakina (third round, withdrew)
15. (Greece) Maria Sakkari (third round)
16. (Belgium) Elise Mertens (second round)
17. (Croatia) Donna Vekić (first round)

== Draw ==
Key

- Q = Qualifier
- WC = Wild card
- LL = Lucky loser
- Alt = Alternate
- ITF = ITF entry
- PR = Protected ranking
- SR = Special ranking
- SE = Special exempt
- JE = Junior exempt
- JR = Junior Accelerator Programme entrant
- CO = College Accelerator Programme entrant
- NG = Next Gen Accelerator Program entrant
- w/o = Walkover
- r = Retired
- d = Defaulted

=== Finals ===
Quarterfinals
1	(Australia) Ashleigh Barty	6	6^{4}	6
11	(Spain) Garbiñe Muguruza	1	7^{7}	2
WC	(Tunisia) Ons Jabeur	6^{2}	6^{4}
8	(Czech Republic) Petra Kvitová	7^{7}	7^{7}
(Russia) Svetlana Kuznetsova	6	6
4	(Switzerland) Belinda Bencic	4	4
(China) Zheng Saisai	6	6^{2}	3
9	(Belarus) Aryna Sabalenka	3	7^{7}	6

Semifinals
1	(Australia) Ashleigh Barty	4	6	4
8	(Czech Republic) Petra Kvitová	6	2	6
(Russia) Svetlana Kuznetsova	4	3
9	(Belarus) Aryna Sabalenka	6	6

Final
8	(Czech Republic) Petra Kvitová	3	3
9	(Belarus) Aryna Sabalenka	6	6

=== Top half ===
==== Section 1 ====
First round
Q	(Germany) L Siegemund	6	6
PR	(Kazakhstan) Y Shvedova	3	2
(Belgium) A Van Uytvanck	6	6
(Slovenia) P Hercog	2	2
WC	(Romania) S Cîrstea	6	3	1
14	(Kazakhstan) E Rybakina	3	6	6
11	(Spain) G Muguruza	7	5	6
Q	(Russia) D Kasatkina	5	7	3
Q	(Australia) P Hon	2	4
(Australia) A Tomljanović	6	6
(Ukraine) D Yastremska	6	6
Q	(Belgium) K Flipkens	2	4

Second round
1	(Australia) A Barty	6	6
Q	(Germany) L Siegemund	3	2
(Belgium) A Van Uytvanck	7	2	6^{8}
14	(Kazakhstan) E Rybakina	5	6	7^{10}
11	(Spain) G Muguruza	6	6
(Australia) A Tomljanović	1	2
(Ukraine) D Yastremska	6	7^{7}
6	(United States) S Kenin	3	6^{4}

Third round
1	(Australia) A Barty	w/o
14	(Kazakhstan) E Rybakina
11	(Spain) G Muguruza	6	6
(Ukraine) D Yastremska	2	4

Quarterfinals
1	(Australia) A Barty	6	6^{4}	6
11	(Spain) G Muguruza	1	7^{7}	2

==== Section 2 ====
First round
Q	(United States) B Pera	6	6
(France) C Garcia	3	1
WC	(Tunisia) O Jabeur	6	6
Q	(Czech Republic) K Siniaková	3	2
(United States) J Brady	7^{12}	1	7^{7}
13	(United States) A Riske	6^{10}	6	6^{3}
10	(Croatia) P Martić	6	1	2
(Czech Republic) B Strýcová	4	6	6
(Latvia) J Ostapenko	7	2	7
Q	(Switzerland) J Teichmann	5	6	5
(China) S Zhang	5	0
(Spain) C Suárez Navarro	7	6

Second round
3	(Czech Republic) Ka Plíšková	6	6
Q	(United States) B Pera	3	0
WC	(Tunisia) O Jabeur	6	6
(United States) J Brady	4	3
(Czech Republic) B Strýcová	1	2
(Latvia) J Ostapenko	6	6
(Spain) C Suárez Navarro	6	3	0
8	(Czech Republic) P Kvitová	4	6	6

Third round
3	(Czech Republic) Ka Plíšková	4	6	3
WC	(Tunisia) O Jabeur	6	3	6
(Latvia) J Ostapenko	2	7	1
8	(Czech Republic) P Kvitová	6	5	6

Quarterfinals
WC	(Tunisia) O Jabeur	6^{2}	6^{4}
8	(Czech Republic) P Kvitová	7^{7}	7^{7}

=== Bottom half ===
==== Section 3 ====
First round
(United States) A Anisimova	6	7^{7}
(Russia) E Alexandrova	3	6^{4}
(Russia) S Kuznetsova	6	6
WC	(Turkey) Ç Büyükakçay	2	2
(Poland) I Świątek	6	7
17	(Croatia) D Vekić	4	5
16	(Belgium) E Mertens	6	6
(China) Q Wang	1	2
LL	(Hungary) T Babos	3	4
(Kazakhstan) Y Putintseva	6	6
(France) K Mladenovic	6^{6}	6	3
(Russia) V Kudermetova	7^{8}	0	6

Second round
5	(Ukraine) E Svitolina	3	3
(United States) A Anisimova	6	6
(Russia) S Kuznetsova	6	6
(Poland) I Świątek	2	2
16	(Belgium) E Mertens	6	3	2
(Kazakhstan) Y Putintseva	4	6	6
(Russia) V Kudermetova	4	6	6^{4}
4	(Switzerland) B Bencic	6	4	7^{7}

Third round
(United States) A Anisimova
(Russia) S Kuznetsova	w/o
(Kazakhstan) Y Putintseva	4	3
4	(Switzerland) B Bencic	6	6

Quarterfinals
(Russia) S Kuznetsova	6	6
4	(Switzerland) B Bencic	4	4

==== Section 4 ====
First round
(Czech Republic) K Muchová	6	6
(Poland) M Linette	3	1
(Chinese Taipei) S-w Hsieh	4	4
WC	(Russia) V Zvonareva	6	6
(China) S Zheng	1	6	6
12	(Czech Republic) M Vondroušová	6	3	2
15	(Greece) M Sakkari	6	6
(Germany) J Görges	4	3
LL	(Japan) M Doi	2	6	2
Q	(Czech Republic) T Martincová	6	3	6
(Estonia) A Kontaveit	6	7^{7}
(Latvia) A Sevastova	4	6^{3}

Second round
7	(Netherlands) K Bertens	6	6
(Czech Republic) K Muchová	2	4
WC	(Russia) V Zvonareva	5	1
(China) S Zheng	7	6
15	(Greece) M Sakkari	3	7^{7}	6
Q	(Czech Republic) T Martincová	6	6^{5}	0
(Estonia) A Kontaveit	5	6	5
9	(Belarus) A Sabalenka	7	2	7

Third round
7	(Netherlands) K Bertens	6	3	4
(China) S Zheng	3	6	6
15	(Greece) M Sakkari	3	0
9	(Belarus) A Sabalenka	6	6

Quarterfinals
(China) S Zheng	6	6^{2}	3
9	(Belarus) A Sabalenka	3	7^{7}	6

== Qualifying ==
=== Seeds ===
1. (Czech Republic) Kateřina Siniaková (qualified)
2. (Russia) Anna Blinkova (first round)
3. (United States) Bernarda Pera (qualified)
4. (Czech Republic) Kristýna Plíšková (first round)
5. (Switzerland) Jil Teichmann (qualified)
6. (Russia) Daria Kasatkina (qualified)
7. (Germany) Laura Siegemund (qualified)
8. (Belgium) Kirsten Flipkens (qualified)
9. (Romania) Patricia Maria Țig (withdrew)
10. (Japan) Misaki Doi (qualifying competition, lucky loser)
11. (Switzerland) Viktorija Golubic (first round)
12. (Hungary) Tímea Babos (Qualifying competition, lucky loser)
13. (Italy) Camila Giorgi (qualifying competition)
14. (Russia) Varvara Gracheva (first round)
15. (China) Peng Shuai (first round)
16. (Belgium) Greet Minnen (qualifying competition)

=== Qualifiers ===
1. (Czech Republic) Kateřina Siniaková
2. (Australia) Priscilla Hon
3. (United States) Bernarda Pera
4. (Czech Republic) Tereza Martincová
5. (Switzerland) Jil Teichmann
6. (Russia) Daria Kasatkina
7. (Germany) Laura Siegemund
8. (Belgium) Kirsten Flipkens

=== Lucky losers ===
1. (Japan) Misaki Doi
2. (Hungary) Tímea Babos

=== Draw ===
==== First qualifier ====
First round
1	(Czech Republic) Kateřina Siniaková	6	6
(China) Han Xinyun	2	2
WC	(Algeria) Inès Ibbou	1	3
12	(Hungary) Tímea Babos	6	6

Qualifying competition
1	(Czech Republic) Kateřina Siniaková	6	6
12	(Hungary) Tímea Babos	3	4

==== Second qualifier ====
First round
2	(Russia) Anna Blinkova	3	3
(Russia) Liudmila Samsonova	6	6
(Australia) Priscilla Hon	6	6
Alt	(Czech Republic) Lucie Hradecká	4	1

Qualifying competition
(Russia) Liudmila Samsonova	6	4	6^{2}
(Australia) Priscilla Hon	3	6	7^{7}

==== Third qualifier ====
First round
3	(United States) Bernarda Pera	6	3
WC	(Ukraine) Daria Lopatetska	3	0^{r}
(Austria) Barbara Haas	6	6^{3}	0
13	(Italy) Camila Giorgi	3	7^{7}	6

Qualifying competition
3	(United States) Bernarda Pera	7^{8}	4	6
13	(Italy) Camila Giorgi	6^{6}	6	4

==== Fourth qualifier ====
First round
4	(Czech Republic) Kristýna Plíšková	6^{5}	5
(Czech Republic) Tereza Martincová	7^{7}	7
(Kazakhstan) Anna Danilina	4	2
10	(Japan) Misaki Doi	6	6

Qualifying competition
(Czech Republic) Tereza Martincová	7	6
10	(Japan) Misaki Doi	5	1

==== Fifth qualifier ====
First round
5	(Switzerland) Jil Teichmann	6	6
(Russia) Margarita Gasparyan	3	4
(Slovakia) Jana Čepelová	6	4	6
14	(Russia) Varvara Gracheva	4	6	4

Qualifying competition
5	(Switzerland) Jil Teichmann	7	6
(Slovakia) Jana Čepelová	5	2

==== Sixth qualifier ====
First round
6	(Russia) Daria Kasatkina	6^{7}	6	4
(Russia) Natalia Vikhlyantseva	7^{9}	4	0^{r}
(Belarus) Aliaksandra Sasnovich	3	6	6
11	(Switzerland) Viktorija Golubic	6	3	1

Qualifying competition
6	(Russia) Daria Kasatkina	5	6	6
(Belarus) Aliaksandra Sasnovich	7	1	1

==== Seventh qualifier ====
First round
7	(Germany) Laura Siegemund	6	6
WC	(Qatar) Mubaraka Al-Naimi	0	0
(Poland) Magdalena Fręch	6	6^{5}	6
15	(China) Peng Shuai	4	7^{7}	0

Qualifying competition
7	(Germany) Laura Siegemund	7	7
(Poland) Magdalena Fręch	5	5

==== Eighth qualifier ====
First round
8	(Belgium) Kirsten Flipkens	6	7^{7}
(Belgium) Ysaline Bonaventure	3	6^{4}
(Ukraine) Lesia Tsurenko	6	4	1
16	(Belgium) Greet Minnen	3	6	6

Qualifying competition
8	(Belgium) Kirsten Flipkens	6	6
16	(Belgium) Greet Minnen	1	3
