= Tereza Martincová =

Czech tennis player (born 1994)

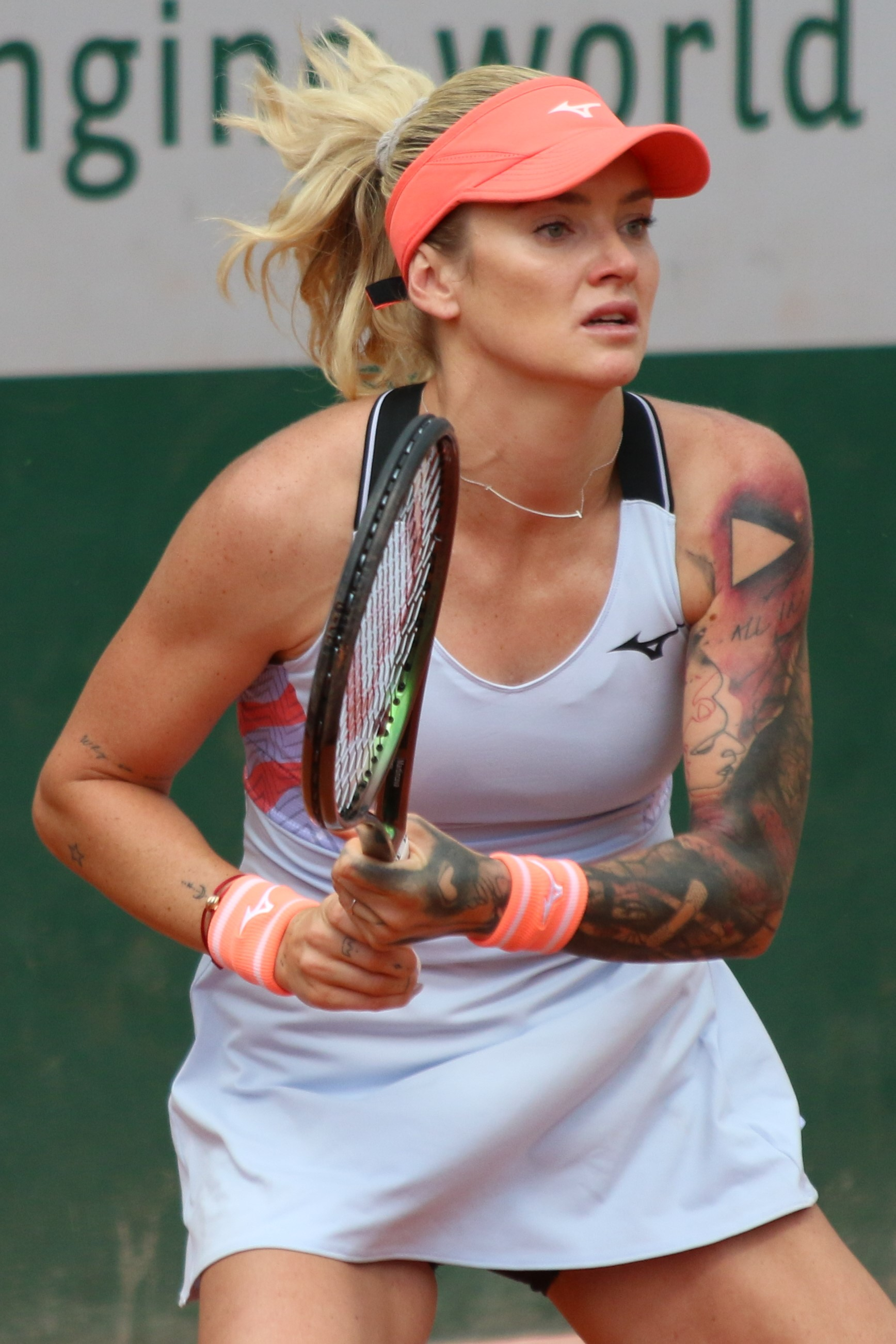
- Martincová at the 2022 French Open
- Country (sports): Czech Republic
- Residence: Prague, Czech Republic
- Born: 24 October 1994 (age 31) Prague
- Height: 1.77 m (5 ft 10 in)
- Plays: Right (two-handed backhand)
- Prize money: $2,475,131

Singles
- Career record: 458–379
- Career titles: 0 WTA, 5 ITF
- Highest ranking: No. 40 (14 February 2022)
- Current ranking: No. 309 (3 August 2026)

Grand Slam singles results
- Australian Open: 2R (2022)
- French Open: 2R (2021)
- Wimbledon: 3R (2021)
- US Open: 1R (2017, 2019, 2020, 2021, 2022)

Doubles
- Career record: 52–54
- Career titles: 1 WTA
- Highest ranking: No. 77 (6 June 2022)

Grand Slam doubles results
- Australian Open: 2R (2022)
- French Open: 1R (2022)
- Wimbledon: 2R (2021, 2022)
- US Open: 2R (2021)
- Last updated on: 7 August 2026.

Tereza Martincová (Czech pronunciation: [ˈtɛrɛza ˈmarcɪntsovaː]; born 24 October 1994) is a Czech professional tennis player.

Martincová has won one doubles title on the WTA Tour and five singles titles on the ITF Circuit. On 14 February 2022, she reached her best singles ranking of world No. 40. On 8 August 2022, she peaked at No. 77 in the WTA doubles rankings.

== Career ==
=== 2013–15 ===
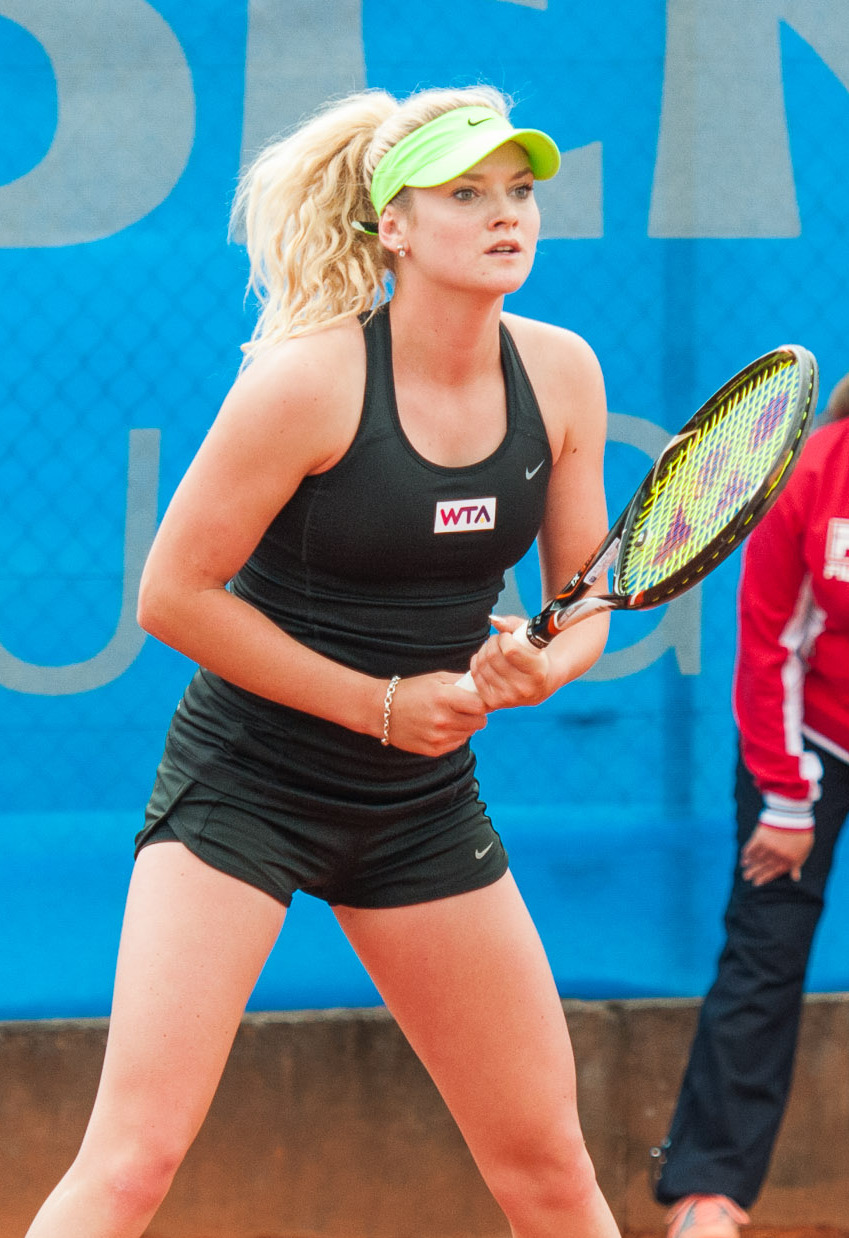
Martincová in Nuremberg, 2014

In June 2013, Martincová made her WTA Tour main-draw debut at the Nürnberger Versicherungscup. After coming through all three qualifying rounds, she lost to Estrella Cabeza Candela in round one. One month later, Martincová once again came through qualifying at the Baku Cup, defeating Oksana Kalashnikova in the first round, but losing to Tadeja Majerič in the second.

In 2014, first WTA Tour event for Martincová was the Nürnberger Versicherungscup where she qualified for the main draw, and then lost to Anastasia Rodionova. She qualified for the Swedish Open in Båstad, before Mona Barthel defeated her in the first round. At the Tournoi de Québec, Martincová once again passed qualifying, but again lost in the first main-draw round, this time to Shelby Rogers.

In 2015, Martincová made her first WTA Tour quarterfinal at the Brasil Tennis Cup after victories over Quirine Lemoine and Ajla Tomljanović. She also made her major debut at the US Open.

=== 2016–20 ===
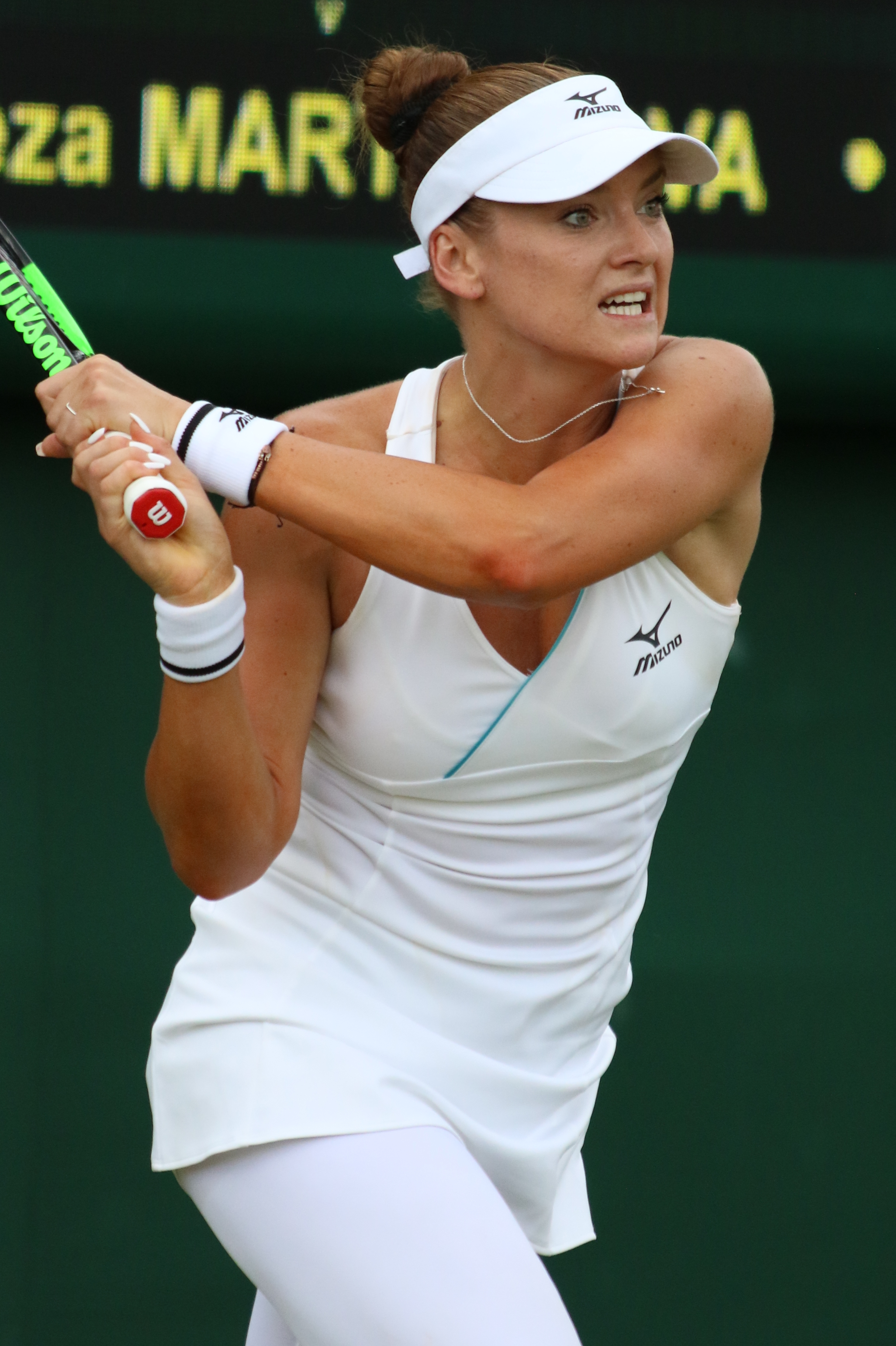
Martincová at the 2019 Wimbledon Championships.

In 2016, she improved her best performance on WTA Tour, making it to the semifinals of the Tournois de Québec, and earning victories over Barbora Krejčíková, Ekaterina Alexandrova and Jessica Pegula.

Martincová realized her best performance at a major championship in 2017, reaching the first round at the US Open by defeating Valentini Grammatikopoulou, Vera Lapko and Georgia Brescia in qualifying. She repeated her best performance on the WTA Tour, reaching the semifinals of the Ladies Championship Gstaad.

In 2018, she reached her second ITF Circuit final in doubles, playing alongside Michaëlla Krajicek.

She won her fourth ITF title in Essen, defeating Paula Badosa in the 2019 final. She achieved her best performance at Wimbledon, reaching the first round by defeating Xu Shilin, Caroline Dolehide and Anna Blinkova in qualifying. She also reached the first round of the US Open, repeating her best performance at this tournament, and third qualifying round at the Australian Open.

Her performances kept improving in 2020 when she repeated her best score in Melbourne, reaching last qualifying round. At the Qatar Ladies Open, she went through qualifying defeating Kristýna Plíšková and Misaki Doi. She reached the second round of the tournament by defeating Misaki Doi (playing as lucky loser) again, and then lost to Maria Sakkari. This was the first time, she reached the main draw of a Premier-5 tournament.

=== 2021–22: Top 100 in singles & doubles, WTA Tour singles final & first title in doubles ===
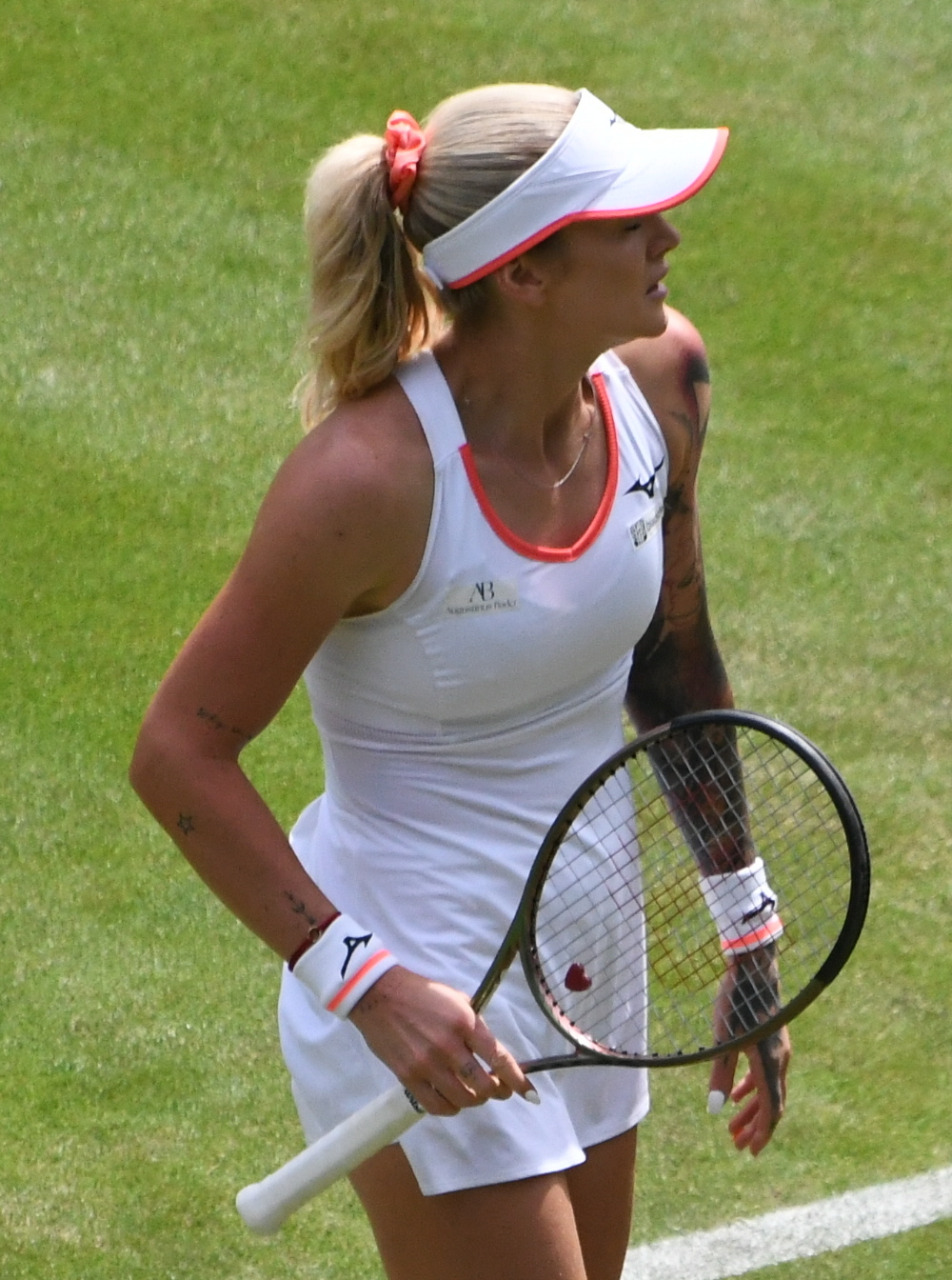
Martincová at the 2022 Wimbledon Championships.

Qualified for 2021 Dubai Championships, she reached the third round at a WTA-1000 event for the first time, defeating Kristýna Plíšková and world No. 11, Kiki Bertens. After qualifying for another WTA-1000 event in Miami and making second round, where she pushed world No. 9 and eventual finalist, Bianca Andreescu, to a tiebreak in the first set, she made her top 100 singles debut. Later, she scored her first Grand Slam tournament match-win at the French Open, defeating Ivana Jorović 6–3, 7–6. She then lost to 28th seeded Jessica Pegula, in straight sets. Martincová started her grass-court season with quarterfinal showings in Nottingham and Birmingham, scoring big wins over former top-10 members and major champions, Samantha Stosur and Jeļena Ostapenko. Entering Wimbledon in good form, she stormed into the third round on grandslam for the first time, defeating former quarterfinalist Alison Riske and Nadia Podoroska. Her run was ended by eventual finalist and compatriot Karolína Plíšková.

Martincová then reached her first WTA Tour final in Prague without dropping a set. She won just two games in the championship match against compatriot and French Open champion Barbora Krejčíková. Entering the US Open unseeded, Martincová was swept aside in the first round by 18th seed Victoria Azarenka in the straight sets, despite being 4–1 up in the first set. In September 2021, she reached her first WTA 500 level quarterfinal in 2021 Ostrava Open, defeating Kateřina Siniaková and Anastasia Pavlyuchenkova before losing to eventual finalist Maria Sakkari. She ended season by losing a titanic battle at Kremlin Cup, losing 4–6, 6–4, 3–6 to world No. 6 and eventual 2021 WTA Finals champion, Garbiñe Muguruza, in the second round. In November, she made her top 50 debut, finishing year as world No. 48.

Martincová qualified into the Australian Open main draw for the first time. In the first round, she defeated Lauren Davis, before she lost to 30th seeded Camila Giorgi in the second. She won just one singles match before entering the Australian Open, but she reached her first WTA doubles final at the Melbourne Summer Set 2 with Mayar Sherif, followed by another doubles final the following week at the Adelaide International 2 with Markéta Vondroušová, losing both in three sets. Martincová made her top 100 debut in doubles, after reaching the second round of the Australian Open with Vondroušová.

Partnering Marta Kostyuk, Martincová won the doubles title at the 2022 Portorož Open, defeating Tereza Mihalíková and Cristina Bucșa in the final.

=== 2023: Drop in results ===
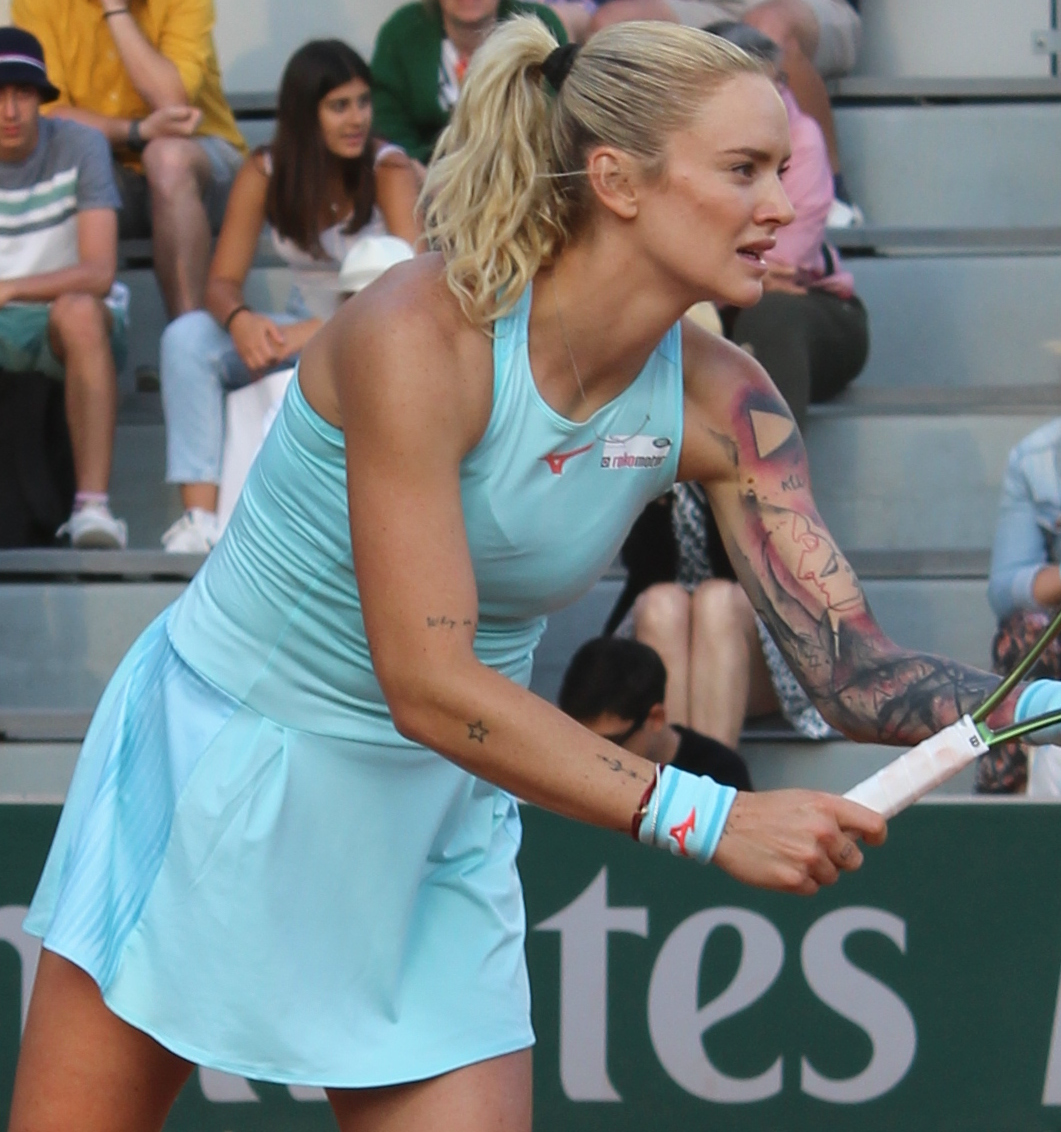
Martincová at the 2023 French Open.

After two successful years, she made significant drop during the 2023 season. She started with three first-round losses at the Australian Tour - Auckland Classic, Hobart International and Australian Open, respectively. No progress at the following tournaments such as not passing qualifying at the WTA 1000 Qatar Ladies & Indian Wells Open. She then recorded her first year tour-level win at the Miami Open where she defeated Tamara Korpatsch, before losing to Beatriz Haddad Maia. Both matches were played in the three sets.

Due to weak tour level performances, she was forced to also play some ITF tournaments. As her preparation for the following clay-court season, she played at the $80k Zaragoza tournament, where she was advanced to the final. Despite losing to Viktoriya Tomova in the final, it was her first significant result of the year. Still, she continued to struggle with results, since she was eliminated in the qualifying of the Madrid Open, reaching only first round of the Italian Open and losing in the first round of the French Open. During the grass-court season, she recorded her second tour win of the year at the Birmingham Classic. After a first-round loss at Wimbledon, she started with some better results when she reached semifinals of the WTA Challenger at Contrexéville, France. She followed this up with the second round of the Warsaw Open, quarterfinals at the Prague Open, and another quarterfinal at the WTA 125 Polish Open.

=== 2024 ===
Martincová qualified for the ATX Open but lost in the first round to second seed Sloane Stephens, in straight sets.

=== 2026 ===
After years of struggling because of knee and wrist injuries and two surgeries, Martincová won her first WTA Tour main-draw match since 2023 at Ostrava Open, beating top-100 player Dalma Gálfi, in three sets.

Martincová claimed her biggest career title as qualifier at W75 tournament in Prague, her run included wins over defending champion Gabriela Knutson and top seed Sinja Kraus. As a result, she moved back to the top 300 in the WTA rankings.

== Endorsements ==
She is sponsored by Mizuno for her clothing and by Wilson for her racquets.

== Performance timelines ==
Key
W	F	SF	QF	#R	RR	Q#	P#	DNQ	A	Z#	PO	G	S	B	NMS	NTI	P	NH

(W) winner; (F) finalist; (SF) semifinalist; (QF) quarterfinalist; (#R) rounds 4, 3, 2, 1; (RR) round-robin stage; (Q#) qualification round; (P#) preliminary round; (DNQ) did not qualify; (A) absent; (Z#) Davis/Fed Cup Zonal Group (with number indication) or (PO) play-off; (G) gold, (S) silver or (B) bronze Olympic/Paralympic medal; (NMS) not a Masters tournament; (NTI) not a Tier I tournament; (P) postponed; (NH) not held; (SR) strike rate (events won / competed); (W–L) win–loss record.
To avoid confusion and double counting, these charts are updated at the conclusion of a tournament or when the player's participation has ended.

Only main-draw results in WTA Tour, Grand Slam tournaments, Billie Jean King Cup, Hopman Cup, United Cup and Olympic Games are included in win–loss records.

=== Singles ===
Current through the 2024 Wuhan Open.

Tournament	2013	2014	2015	2016	2017	2018	2019	2020	2021	2022	2023	2024	SR	W–L	Win %
Grand Slam tournaments
Australian Open	A	A	A	Q2	Q1	Q1	Q3	Q3	Q2	2R	1R	Q1	0 / 2	1–2	33%
French Open	A	A	A	Q1	Q2	Q1	Q1	Q3	2R	1R	1R	Q1	0 / 3	1–3	25%
Wimbledon	A	A	A	Q1	Q1	Q1	1R	NH	3R	1R	1R	Q2	0 / 4	2–4	33%
US Open	A	A	Q1	A	1R	Q2	1R	1R	1R	1R	Q1	A	0 / 5	0–5	0%
Win–Loss	0–0	0–0	0–0	0–0	0–1	0–0	0–2	0–1	3–3	1–4	0–3	0–0	0 / 14	4–14	22%
WTA 1000 tournaments
Dubai / Qatar Open (Note: The first Premier 5 event of the year has switched back and forth between the Dubai Tennis Championships and the Qatar Open since 2009. Dubai was classified as a Premier 5 event from 2009 to 2011 before being succeeded by Doha for the 2012–2014 period. In 2015, Dubai regained its Premier 5 status while Doha was demoted to Premier status. The two tournaments have since alternated status every year. The Premier 5 tournaments were reclassified as WTA 1000 tournaments in 2021.)	A	A	A	A	A	Q1	A	2R	3R	3R	Q2	Q1	0 / 3	5–3	63%
Indian Wells Open	A	A	A	A	Q2	A	A	NH	2R	2R	Q1	A	0 / 2	2–2	50%
Miami Open	A	A	A	A	A	Q2	A	NH	2R	1R	2R	A	0 / 3	2–3	40%
Madrid Open	A	A	A	A	A	A	A	NH	A	1R	Q1	A	0 / 1	0–1	0%
Italian Open	A	A	A	A	A	A	A	A	Q1	1R	1R	A	0 / 2	0–2	0%
Canadian Open	A	A	A	A	A	A	A	NH	1R	1R	A	A	0 / 2	0–2	0%
Cincinnati Open	A	A	A	A	A	A	A	A	Q1	2R	A	A	0 / 1	1–1	50%
Guadalajara Open	not held									1R	A	A	0 / 1	0–1	0%
China Open	A	A	A	A	A	A	A	not held			A	A	0 / 0	0–0	–
Pan Pacific / Wuhan Open (Note: In 2014, the Pan Pacific Open was downgraded to a Premier event and replaced by the Wuhan Open. The Premier 5 tournaments were reclassified as WTA 1000 tournaments in 2021.)	A	A	A	A	A	A	A	not held				A	0 / 0	0–0	–
Career statistics
	2013	2014	2015	2016	2017	2018	2019	2020	2021	2022	2023	2024	SR	W–L	Win %
Tournaments	2	3	1	6	7	7	7	6	20	25	14	1	Career total: 99		
Titles	0	0	0	0	0	0	0	0	0	0	0	0	Career total: 0		
Finals	0	0	0	0	0	0	0	0	1	0	0	0	Career total: 1		
Hard win–loss	1–1	0–1	0–0	4–5	2–5	1–4	2–5	2–5	18–13	13–17	4–7	0–1	0 / 64	47–64	42%
Clay win–loss	0–1	0–2	2–1	0–1	3–1	0–2	0–0	3–1	2–4	0–5	0–3		0 / 20	10–21	32%
Grass win–loss	0–0	0–0	0–0	0–0	0–1	0–1	0–2	0–0	6–3	3–4	1–4		0 / 15	10–15	40%
Overall win–loss	1–2	0–3	2–1	4–6	5–7	1–7	2–7	5–6	26–20	16–26	5–14	0–1	0 / 99	67–100	40%
Year-end ranking (Note: 2011: WTA ranking – 876, 2012: WTA ranking – 457.)	297	277	183	158	140	212	130	120	48	73	151	329	$2,311,739		

=== Doubles ===
Current through the 2024 French Open.

Tournament	2014	2015	2016	2017	...	2021	2022	2023	2024	SR	W–L
Grand Slam tournaments
Australian Open	A	A	A	A		A	2R	1R	A	0 / 2	1–2
French Open	A	A	A	A		A	1R	A	A	0 / 1	0–1
Wimbledon	A	A	A	A		2R	2R	1R	A	0 / 3	2–3
US Open	A	A	A	A		2R	1R	A	A	0 / 2	1–2
Win–Loss	0–0	0–0	0–0	0–0		2–2	2–4	0–2	0–0	0 / 8	4–8
WTA 1000 tournaments
Dubai / Qatar Open	A	A	A	A		A	2R	A	A	0 / 1	1–1
Indian Wells Open	A	A	A	A		A	A	A	A	0 / 0	0–0
Miami Open	A	A	A	A		A	A	A	A	0 / 0	0–0
Madrid Open	A	A	A	A		A	A	A	A	0 / 0	0–0
Italian Open	A	A	A	A		A	A	A	A	0 / 0	0–0
Canadian Open	A	A	A	A		A	A	A	A	0 / 0	0–0
Cincinnati Open	A	A	A	A		A	A	A	A	0 / 0	0–0
Guadalajara Open	not held					NH	1R	A		0 / 1	0–1
China Open	A	A	A	A		not held		A		0 / 0	0–0
Pan Pacific / Wuhan Open	A	A	A	A		not held				0 / 0	0–0
Career statistics
Tournaments	1	1	1	1		7	10	4	0	Career total: 25	
Titles	0	0	0	0		0	1	0	0	Career total: 1	
Finals	0	0	0	0		0	3	0	0	Career total: 3	
Overall win–loss	1–1	0–1	1–1	0–1		6–6	12–9	1–4	0–0	1 / 25	21–23
Year-end ranking	387	923	514	817		189	85	630	-		

== WTA Tour finals ==
=== Singles: 1 (runner-up) ===
Legend WTA 250 (0–1)	Finals by surface Hard (0–1)

Result	Date	Tournament	Tier	Surface	Opponent	Score
Loss	Jul 2021	Prague Open, Czech Republic	WTA 250	Hard	(Czech Republic) Barbora Krejčíková	2–6, 0–6

=== Doubles: 3 (1 title, 2 runner-ups) ===
Legend WTA 250 (1–2)	Finals by surface Hard (1–2)

Result	W–L	Date	Tournament	Tier	Surface	Partner	Opponents	Score
Loss	0–1	Jan 2022	Melbourne Summer Set, Australia	WTA 250	Hard	(Egypt) Mayar Sherif	(United States) Bernarda Pera (Czech Republic) Kateřina Siniaková	2–6, 7–6^{(9–7)}, [5–10]
Loss	0–2	Jan 2022	Adelaide International, Australia	WTA 250	Hard	(Czech Republic) Markéta Vondroušová	(Japan) Eri Hozumi (Japan) Makoto Ninomiya	6–1, 6–7^{(4–7)}, [7–10]
Win	1–2	Sep 2022	Portorož Open, Slovenia	WTA 250	Hard	(Ukraine) Marta Kostyuk	(Spain) Cristina Bucșa (Slovakia) Tereza Mihalíková	6–4, 6–0

== ITF Circuit finals ==
=== Singles: 10 (5 titles, 5 runner-ups) ===
Legend W80 tournaments (0–1) W75 tournaments (1–0) W25 tournaments (3–3) W10 tournaments (1–1)	Finals by surface Hard (2–2) Clay (2–3) Carpet (1–0)

Result	W–L	Date	Tournament	Tier	Surface	Opponent	Score
Loss	0–1	Apr 2013	ITF Antalya, Turkey	10k	Hard	(Brazil) Beatriz Haddad Maia	4–6, 3–6
Win	1–1	Apr 2014	ITF Heraklion, Greece	10k	Hard	(Czech Republic) Pernilla Mendesová	6–4, 6–4
Loss	1–2	Aug 2014	ITF Mamaia, Romania	25k	Clay	(Romania) Andreea Mitu	2–6, 4–6
Loss	1–3	Feb 2015	Open de l'Isère, France	25k	Hard (i)	(Poland) Magda Linette	6–7^{(2–7)}, 6–4, 1–6
Loss	1–4	May 2015	Wiesbaden Open, Germany	25k	Clay	(Latvia) Anastasija Sevastova	6–1, 6–3
Win	2–4	Jun 2015	ITF Lenzerheide, Switzerland	25k	Clay	(Slovenia) Nastja Kolar	6–3, 6–4
Win	3–4	Oct 2018	ITF Óbidos, Portugal	25k	Carpet	(Poland) Katarzyna Kawa	7–6^{(7–3)}, 6–3
Win	4–4	Jun 2019	Bredeney Ladies Open, Germany	W25	Clay	(Spain) Paula Badosa	6–2, 7–6^{(7–4)}
Loss	4–5	Apr 2023	Zaragoza Open, Spain	W80	Clay	(Bulgaria) Viktoriya Tomova	6–4, 2–6, 3–6
Win	5–5	Feb 2026	ITF Prague Open, Czech Republic	W75	Hard (i)	(Austria) Sinja Kraus	6–3, 6–4

=== Doubles: 2 (2 runner-ups) ===
Legend 25k tournaments (0–1) 10k tournaments (0–1)	Finals by surface Hard (0–1) Clay (0–1)

Result	W–L	Date	Tournament	Tier	Surface	Partner	Opponents	Score
Loss	0–1	Apr 2012	ITF Hvar, Croatia	10k	Clay	(Czech Republic) Petra Rohanová	(Czech Republic) Martina Kubičíková (Czech Republic) Tereza Smitková	2–6, 4–6
Loss	0–2	Sep 2018	ITF Lisbon, Portugal	25k	Hard	(Netherlands) Michaëlla Krajicek	(Finland) Emma Laine (United Kingdom) Samantha Murray	5–7, 4–6

== WTA Tour career earnings ==
Current after the 2023 Canadian Open.

- Grand Slam titles, WTA titles, Total titles – includes singles, doubles and mixed doubles titles.

Year	Grand Slam titles	WTA titles	Total titles	Earnings ($)	Money list rank
2014	0	0	0	19,726	331
2015	0	0	0	32,323	279
2016	0	0	0	54,205	237
2017	0	0	0	117,652	186
2018	0	0	0	136,948	188
2019	0	0	0	82,774	242
2020	0	0	0	175,307	130
2021	0	0	0	565,332	66
2022	0	1	1	632,615	64
2023	0	0	0	352,638	99
Career	0	1	1	2,285,052	259

== Wins against top 10 players ==
- She has a 1–11 record against players who were, at the time the match was played, ranked in the top 10.

No.	Player	Rk	Event	Surface	Rd	Score	Rk	Years	Ref
1	(Estonia) Anett Kontaveit	3	Ostrava Open, Czech Republic	Hard (i)	2R	7–6^{(7–3)}, 1–0 ret.	78	2022	

- Key: (Rk) first use, opponent rank; (Rd) round; (Rk) 2nd use, player rank; (Ref) reference; (F) final; (SF) semifinal; (QF) quarterfinal; (#R) rounds 4, 3, 2, 1; (RR) round-robin stage; (Q#) qualifying rounds or stages (3), 2, 1.

== Double bagel matches ==
Result	Year	W–L	Tournament	Tier	Surface	Opponent	vsRank	Round	Rank
Win	2011	1–0	ITF Piešťany, Slovakia	10,000	Clay	(Austria) Martina Zolles		Q2	
Win	2011	2–0	ITF Antalya, Turkey	10,000	Clay	(Finland) Johanna Hyöty		Q2	
Win	2014	3–0	ITF Heraklin, Greece	10,000	Hard	(Belgium) Helène Scholsen		2R	
Win	2018	4–0	Mumbai Open, India	WTA 125	Hard	(Japan) Naoko Eto		Q1	
