= 2022 Melbourne Summer Set 2 =

- Date: 4–9 January 2022
- Edition: 1st
- Category: WTA 250
- Draw: 32S / 16D
- Prize money: $239,477
- Surface: Hard

Champions

Singles
- (United States) Amanda Anisimova

Doubles
- (United States) Bernarda Pera / (Czech Republic) Kateřina Siniaková
- Melbourne Summer Set

The 2022 Melbourne Summer Set 2 was one of two tournaments of the Melbourne Summer Set. It was a WTA 250 tournament of the 2022 WTA Tour, and it was played on hardcourts.

Amanda Anisimova won the women's singles title, her second career WTA title. Bernarda Pera and Kateřina Siniaková won the women's doubles title; with the win, Pera earned her first career WTA title.

== Champions ==
=== Singles ===
- (United States) Amanda Anisimova def. (Belarus) Aliaksandra Sasnovich 7–5, 1–6, 6–4

=== Doubles ===
- (United States) Bernarda Pera / (Czech Republic) Kateřina Siniaková def. (Czech Republic) Tereza Martincová / (Egypt) Mayar Sherif 6–2, 6–7^{(7–9)}, [10–5]

== Points and prize money ==
=== Point distribution ===
Event	W	F	SF	QF	Round of 16	Round of 32	Q	Q2	Q1
Singles	280	180	110	60	30	1	18	12	1
Doubles	280	180	110	60	1	—N/a	—N/a	—N/a	—N/a

=== Prize money ===
Event	W	F	SF	QF	Round of 16	Round of 32	Q2	Q1
Singles	$31,000	$18,037	$10,100	$5,800	$3,675	$2,675	$1,950	$1,270
Doubles*	$10,800	$6,300	$3,800	$2,300	$1,750	—N/a	—N/a	—N/a

_{*per team}

== WTA singles main.draw entrants ==
=== Seeds ===
Country	Player	Rank^{1}	Seed
USA	Jessica Pegula	18	1
~~BEL~~	~~Elise Mertens~~	~~21~~	~~2~~
RUS	Daria Kasatkina	26	3
ESP	Sara Sorribes Tormo	36	4
ROU	Sorana Cîrstea	39	5
DEN	Clara Tauson	44	6
USA	Ann Li	47	7
UKR	Marta Kostyuk	50	8

- ^{1} Rankings are as of 27 December 2021

=== Other entrants ===
The following players received wildcards into the singles main draw:

- (Australia) Ellen Perez
- (Australia) Astra Sharma
- (Australia) Samantha Stosur

The following players received entry from the qualifying draw:

- (United Kingdom) Harriet Dart
- (Russia) Anna Kalinskaya
- (United States) Claire Liu
- (Russia) Kamilla Rakhimova
- (Belarus) Aliaksandra Sasnovich
- (China) Zhu Lin

The following player received entry as a lucky loser:

- (China) Wang Xinyu

=== Withdrawals ===
Before the tournament

- (Poland) Magda Linette → replaced by (Brazil) Beatriz Haddad Maia
- (Belgium) Elise Mertens → replaced by (China) Wang Xinyu
- (Russia) Anastasia Pavlyuchenkova → replaced by (Slovakia) Anna Karolína Schmiedlová
- (Kazakhstan) Yulia Putintseva → replaced by (Russia) Varvara Gracheva
- (Croatia) Donna Vekić → replaced by (United States) Amanda Anisimova

=== Retirements ===
- (Russia) Anna Kalinskaya
- (Denmark) Clara Tauson

== WTA doubles main-draw entrants ==
=== Seeds ===
Country	Player	Country	Player	Rank^{1}	Seed
AUS	Samantha Stosur	CHN	Zhang Shuai	24	1
USA	Bernarda Pera	CZE	Kateřina Siniaková	53	2
ROU	Irina-Camelia Begu	SRB	Nina Stojanović	104	3
JPN	Eri Hozumi	JPN	Makoto Ninomiya	114	4

- ^{1} Rankings are as of 27 December 2021

=== Other entrants ===
The following pair received a wildcard into the doubles main draw:

- (Australia) Alexandra Osborne / (Australia) Taylah Preston

The following pair received entry into the doubles main draw using a protected ranking:

- (Australia) Monique Adamczak / (China) Han Xinyun

The following pair received entry into the doubles main draw as an alternate:

- (Brazil) Beatriz Haddad Maia / (Spain) Nuria Párrizas Díaz

=== Withdrawals ===
Before the tournament

- (Spain) Aliona Bolsova / (India) Ankita Raina → replaced by (Spain) Aliona Bolsova / (Poland) Katarzyna Kawa
- (Chinese Taipei) Chan Hao-ching / (Romania) Monica Niculescu → replaced by (Japan) Nao Hibino / (Poland) Alicja Rosolska
- (Russia) Anna Kalinskaya / (Ukraine) Marta Kostyuk → replaced by (Brazil) Beatriz Haddad Maia / (Spain) Nuria Párrizas Díaz
- (Russia) Anastasia Pavlyuchenkova / (Czech Republic) Kateřina Siniaková → replaced by (United States) Bernarda Pera / (Czech Republic) Kateřina Siniaková
- (United States) Bernarda Pera / (Poland) Magda Linette → replaced by (Switzerland) Viktorija Golubic / (Australia) Astra Sharma

== See also ==
- 2022 Melbourne Summer Set 1
