= Melbourne Summer Set =

Tennis tournaments

Melbourne Summer Set was a set of two simultaneous tennis tournaments organized by Tennis Australia at Melbourne Park in Melbourne, Australia for the first time in response to the cancellation of several warm-up tournaments normally scheduled before the Australian Open, including the Brisbane International, Hobart International, ATP Auckland Open, and the WTA Auckland Open, because of the ongoing COVID-19 pandemic. The series consisted of 2022 Melbourne Summer Set 1 and 2022 Melbourne Summer Set 2. It was not continued in 2023.
