= Elise Mertens career statistics =

Professional tennis player

Career finals
Discipline	Type	Won	Lost	Total
Singles	Grand Slam	–	–	–
Singles	WTA Finals	–	–	–
Singles	WTA 1000	–	–	–
Singles	WTA 500	2	0	2
Singles	WTA 250	8	6	14
Singles	Olympics	–	–	–
Singles	Total	10	6	16
Doubles	Grand Slam	6	2	8
Doubles	WTA Finals	2	1	3
Doubles	WTA 1000	7	6	13
Doubles	WTA 500	2	1	3
Doubles	WTA 250	7	4	11
Doubles	Olympics	–	–	–
Doubles	Total	24	14	38

This is a list of the main career statistics of Belgian professional tennis player Elise Mertens since her professional debut in 2010. So far, Mertens has won ten WTA singles titles and 24 career doubles titles, including six Grand Slam titles, as well as one doubles title at WTA Challenger level and 11 singles titles and 13 doubles titles on the ITF Circuit. She reached a career-high WTA singles ranking of No. 12, while in doubles, she was the world No. 1.

Mertens made her WTA Tour debut in 2015 at the Copa Colsanitas. In 2016, she reached and won her first WTA Tour final, in doubles at the Auckland Open. In 2017, she reached her first tour singles final at the Hobart International, where she succeeded to win the title. In 2019, she continued to progress and won her first major title at the 2019 US Open, alongside Aryna Sabalenka; in the final they defeated Ashleigh Barty and Victoria Azarenka. At the 2021 Australian Open, they won another Grand Slam title, this time defeating Barbora Krejčíková and Kateřina Siniaková. On the WTA Tour, Mertens has won 10 singles and 24 doubles titles in total.

== Career achievements ==
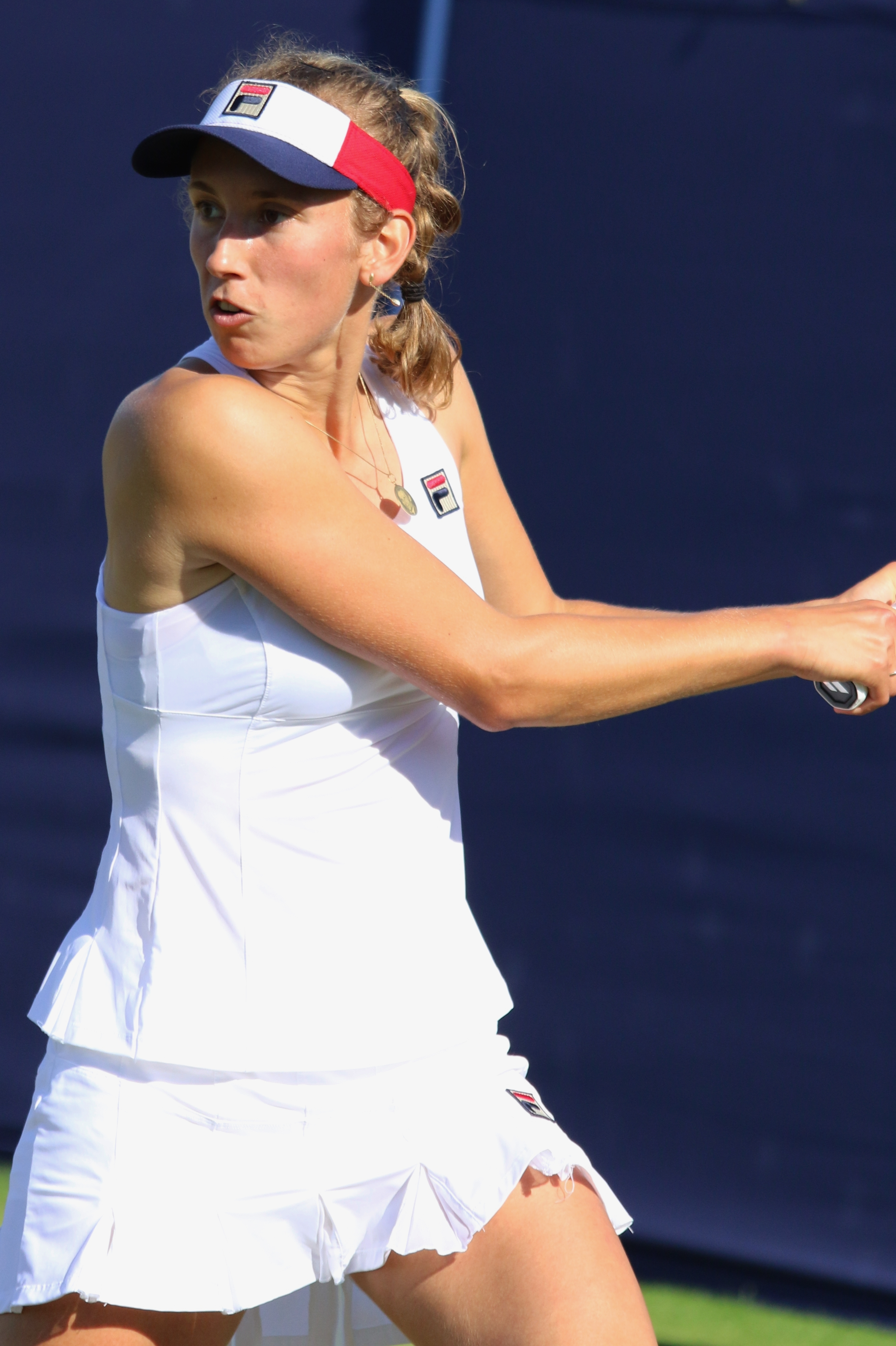
Mertens won most of her titles on hardcourts, including the 2019 US Open and 2021 Australian Open in doubles.

Mertens made her WTA Tour debut at the 2015 Copa Colsanitas, in the doubles event. The following year, she started winning the title at the Auckland Open, partnering with An-Sophie Mestach. In June of the same year, she made her WTA Tour singles debut at the Rosmalen Championships as a qualifier. At Wimbledon, she made her Grand Slam main-draw debut in doubles, and then at the 2016 US Open, also in singles. Mertens started into the 2017 season, winning her first title in singles at the Hobart International defeating Monica Niculescu. In April 2017, she reached another WTA Tour final, but this time finished runner-up at the İstanbul Cup, losing to Elina Svitolina. At the 2017 French Open, she recorded her first Grand Slam match win defeating Daria Gavrilova in the first round. In October 2017, she recorded her first top-10 win over world No. 10, Dominika Cibulková, in the first round of the Premier Mandatory-level China Open.

In the 2018 season, Mertens recorded big improvements. She defended her title at the Hobart International, defeating Mihaela Buzărnescu in the final. There, she also won the title in doubles. She followed this up with her first and so far only major semifinal in singles at the Australian Open. There, she en-route also defeated world No. 4, Elina Svitolina. In April, she continued with good performances, winning titles in both singles and doubles at the Ladies Open Lugano. Soon after that, she won the Morocco Open by defeating Ajla Tomljanović in the final. During the grass season, Mertens had success in doubles. First, she won Rosmalen Championships with Demi Schuurs and then reached the final of the Premier-level Birmingham Classic, also with Schuurs. During the U.S. hardcourt tour, she first reached semifinals of the Premier-level Silicon Valley Classic, and then quarterfinals at the Premier 5-levels Canadian Open and Cincinnati Open. In Cincinnati, she also made top 10 win over world No. 3, Sloane Stephens, and reached the final in doubles. Then, on the Asian hardcourt swing, she won the Premier 5-level Wuhan Open and entered the final of the Premier Mandatory-level China Open, both in doubles with Schuurs. At the end of the year, she competed at the WTA Elite Trophy in singles, and the WTA Finals in doubles, losing both times in the round-robin stage.

Mertens continued to progress in 2019. In February, she won her first Premier singles title at the Qatar Ladies Open by defeating world No. 3, Simona Halep, in the final. En-route she realized two more top-10 wins, over world No. 8, Kiki Bertens, and No. 6, Angelique Kerber. Soon after that, she won the Sunshine Doubles (Indian Wells and Miami Open), both in doubles alongside Aryna Sabalenka. Mertens continued with good performances in doubles, reaching semifinals of the French Open and quarterfinals at Wimbledon. At the US Open, she reached quarterfinals in singles and won the title in doubles alongside Sabalenka. At the 2020 US Open, she reached quarterfinals for the second year in-a-row, and finished on the same stage in doubles. Mertens started 2021 season winning the title at the WTA 500-level Gippsland Trophy in Melbourne, right before the Australian Open where she also defeated world No. 5 Elina Svitolina. At the Australian Open, she won her second Grand Slam doubles title, again with Sabalenka. Mertens ascended to world No. 1 in doubles, on 10 May 2021.

Mertens would go onto win her third doubles slam at Wimbledon with Hsieh Su-wei later that year. The following year she won her first WTA Finals title with another new partner, Veronika Kudermetova.

== Performance timelines ==
Key
W	F	SF	QF	#R	RR	Q#	P#	DNQ	A	Z#	PO	G	S	B	NMS	NTI	P	NH

(W) winner; (F) finalist; (SF) semifinalist; (QF) quarterfinalist; (#R) rounds 4, 3, 2, 1; (RR) round-robin stage; (Q#) qualification round; (P#) preliminary round; (DNQ) did not qualify; (A) absent; (Z#) Davis/Fed Cup Zonal Group (with number indication) or (PO) play-off; (G) gold, (S) silver or (B) bronze Olympic/Paralympic medal; (NMS) not a Masters tournament; (NTI) not a Tier I tournament; (P) postponed; (NH) not held; (SR) strike rate (events won / competed); (W–L) win–loss record.
To avoid confusion and double counting, these charts are updated at the conclusion of a tournament or when the player's participation has ended.

Only main-draw results in WTA Tour, Grand Slam tournaments, Billie Jean King Cup, United Cup, Hopman Cup and Olympic Games are included in win–loss records.

=== Singles ===
Current through the 2026 Australian Open Open.

Tournament	2016	2017	2018	2019	2020	2021	2022	2023	2024	2025	2026	SR	W–L	Win %
Grand Slam tournaments
Australian Open	Q2	A	SF	3R	4R	4R	4R	3R	2R	2R	4R	0 / 9	23–9	72%
French Open	Q3	3R	4R	3R	3R	3R	4R	4R	3R	1R	2R	0 / 10	20–10	67%
Wimbledon	Q2	1R	3R	4R	NH	3R	4R	2R	2R	4R	QF	0 / 9	19–9	68%
US Open	1R	1R	4R	QF	QF	4R	1R	3R	4R	3R	3R	0 / 11	23–11	68%
Win–Loss	0–1	2–3	13–4	11–4	9–3	10–4	9–4	8–4	7–4	6–4	10–4	0 / 39	85–39	69%
Year-end championships
WTA Finals	Did Not Qualify				NH	Alt	Did Not Qualify					0 / 0	0–0	–
WTA Elite Trophy (Note: WTA Tournament of Champions was held from 2009 to 2014, when WTA Elite Trophy replaced it.)	DNQ		RR	RR	Not Held			DNQ	Not Held			0 / 2	2–2	50%
National representation
Summer Olympics	A	Not Held				1R	Not Held		A	Not Held		0 / 1	0–1	0%
Billie Jean King Cup (Note: Formerly known as Fed Cup until 2020.)	A	PO	1R	1R	RR (Note: Edition is split into the two years due to COVID-19.)		RR	A	A	A	QR	0 / 5	10–5	67%
WTA 1000 tournaments
Qatar Open	A	NTI	2R	NTI	2R	NTI	3R	NTI	2R	3R	2R	0 / 6	8–6	57%
Dubai Championships	NTI	2R	NTI	1R	NTI	SF	NTI	A	1R	2R	3R	0 / 6	8–6	57%
Indian Wells Open	A	Q1	2R	3R	NH	2R	3R	1R	4R	3R	3R	0 / 8	6–8	43%
Miami Open	A	Q1	3R	3R	NH	4R	2R	4R	2R	3R	3R	0 / 8	9–8	53%
Madrid Open	A	A	2R	1R	NH	QF	A	4R	2R	3R	3R	0 / 7	8–7	53%
Italian Open	A	A	A	1R	QF	1R	A	2R	3R	4R	4R	0 / 7	8–7	53%
Canadian Open	A	A	QF	2R	NH	1R	2R	1R	3R	2R	3R	0 / 7	8–7	54%
Cincinnati Open	A	Q1	QF	2R	SF	2R	3R	2R	1R	3R	2R	0 / 9	13–9	62%
China Open	A	2R	1R	2R	Not Held			1R	3R	3R	SF	0 / 7	8–7	53%
Wuhan Open	A	2R	1R	2R	Not Held				1R	2R	2R	0 / 5	3–6	33%
Guadalajara Open	Not Held						2R	2R	Not Tier I			0 / 2	2–2	50%
Win–Loss	0–0	3–3	9–8	6–9	8–3	10–7	7–6	7–8	7–10	9–7	13–10	0 / 69	79–71	53%
Career statistics
	2016	2017	2018	2019	2020	2021	2022	2023	2024	2025	2026	SR	W–L	Win %
Tournaments	3	22	23	26	13	20	22	22	24	19	17	Career total: 218		
Titles	0	1	3	1	0	1	1	1	0	2	0	Career total: 10		
Finals	0	2	3	1	2	2	1	1	1	3	1	Career total: 17		
Hard Win–Loss	0–1	18–11	28–16	24–17	25–9	22–12	19–15	21–16	16–14	20–10	21–12	7 / 136	214–133	62%
Clay Win–Loss	0–0	13–6	16–2	4–6	9–4	9–5	4–3	7–4	6–5	6–5	5–4	2 / 48	79–44	64%
Grass Win–Loss	3–2	1–4	4–4	7–4	NH	2–3	4–4	1–2	3–4	8–2	7–4	1 / 35	40–33	55%
Overall Win–Loss	3–3	32–21	48–22	35–27	34–13	33–20	27–22	29–21	25–23	34–16	33–20	10 / 219	333–210	61%
Win %	50%	60%	69%	56%	72%	62%	55%	58%	52%	68%	62%	Career total: 61%		
Year-end ranking (Note: 2013: WTA ranking–577, 2014: WTA ranking–264.)	120	35	13	17	20	21	29	29	34	20		$18,107,463		

=== Doubles ===
Current through the 2025 French Open .

Tournament	2015	2016	2017	2018	2019	2020	2021	2022	2023	2024	2025	2026	SR	W–L	Win%
Grand Slam tournaments
Australian Open	A	A	2R	1R	3R	QF	W	SF	QF	W	2R	W	3 / 10	31-7	78%
French Open	A	A	1R	1R	SF	2R	3R	3R	3R	2R	QF	3R	0 / 10	14–9	60%
Wimbledon	A	2R	3R	3R	QF	NH	W	F	F	SF	W	2R	2 / 10	34–8	83%
US Open	A	A	2R	QF	W	QF	QF	2R (Note: Withdraw during the tournament. Not counted as a loss.)	1R	1R	SF	SF	1 / 10	24–8	75%
Win–Loss	0–0	1–1	4–4	5–4	15–3	6–3	16–2	12–3	10–4	11–3	13–3	9–1	6 / 36	98–31	74%
Year-end championships
WTA Finals	DNQ			RR	RR	NH	F	W	SF	RR	W		2 / 6	15–7	68%
National representation
Summer Olympics	NH	A	Not Held				1R	Not Held		A	NH		0 / 1	0–1	0%
WTA 1000 tournaments
Qatar Open	NTI	A	NTI	2R	NTI	QF	NTI	F	NTI	QF	QF	A	0 / 5	7–5	58%
Dubai Championships	A	NTI	1R	NTI	A	NTI	2R	NTI	A	2R	1R	2R	0 / 5	0–5	0%
Indian Wells Open	A	A	A	2R	W	NH	W	1R	QF	W	1R	1R	3 / 8	18–5	82%
Miami Open	A	A	A	SF	W	NH	1R	F	QF	QF	QF	SF	1 / 8	21–7	75%
Madrid Open	A	A	A	1R	2R	NH	2R	A	2R	SF	F	2R	0 / 7	8–5	64%
Italian Open	A	A	A	A	2R	A	2R	A	W	QF	F	1R	1 / 6	11–5	73%
Canadian Open	A	A	A	A	A	NH	QF	2R	SF	2R	2R	QF	0 / 5	6–5	50%
Cincinnati Open	A	A	1R	F	2R	QF (Note: Mertens' and Sabalenka's withdrawal before the quarterfinals against Lucie Hradecká and Andreja Klepač is not counted as a loss.)	2R	SF	SF	2R	2R	1R	0 / 9	11–8	61%
China Open	A	A	2R	SF	2R	Not Held			2R	1R	2R		0 / 5	3–5	38%
Wuhan Open	A	A	1R	W	F	Not Held				2R	1R		1 / 4	9–3	75%
Guadalajara Open	Not Held							QF (Note: Mertens' and Kudermetova's withdrawal before the quarterfinals against Storm Sanders and Luisa Stefani is not counted as a loss.)	W	Not Tier I			1 / 2	5–0	100%
Career statistics
	2015	2016	2017	2018	2019	2020	2021	2022	2023	2024	2025		SR	W–L	Win%
Tournament	3	8	20	16	14	7	17	16	13	10	11		Career total: 134		
Titles	0	1	1	4	3	1	4	2	2	3	0		Career total: 20		
Finals	0	1	3	6	4	1	5	6	4	3	2		Career total: 34		
Hard Win–Loss	0–1	4–3	13–12	23–9	22–7	13–4	19–10	28–8	19–8	15–8	5–5		13 / 86	162–75	68%
Clay Win–Loss	1–2	1–2	7–4	5–1	4–3	1–1	6–3	4–2	8–3	3–1	11–3		3 / 26	51–24	68%
Grass Win–Loss	0–0	1–2	3–3	10–3	4–2	NH	8–1	11–2	5–1	8–1	7–0		4 / 23	57–15	79%
Overall Win–Loss	1–3	6–7	23–19	38–13	30–12	14–5	33–14	43–12	32–12	26–10	23–8		22 / 135	269–115	70%
Win %	25%	46%	55%	75%	71%	74%	70%	78%	73%	72%	74%		Career total: 70%		
Year-end ranking (Note: Doubles: 2013: WTA ranking–725, 2014: WTA ranking–259.)	134	79	41	11	6	6	4	5	2	9					

== Grand Slam tournament finals ==
=== Doubles: 8 (6 titles, 2 runner-ups) ===
Result	Year	Tournament	Surface	Partner	Opponents	Score
Win	2019	US Open	Hard	(Belarus) Aryna Sabalenka	(Belarus) Victoria Azarenka (Australia) Ashleigh Barty	7–5, 7–5
Win	2021	Australian Open	Hard	(Belarus) Aryna Sabalenka	(Czech Republic) Barbora Krejčíková (Czech Republic) Kateřina Siniaková	6–2, 6–3
Win	2021	Wimbledon	Grass	(Chinese Taipei) Hsieh Su-wei	(Russia) Veronika Kudermetova (Russia) Elena Vesnina	3–6, 7–5, 9–7
Loss	2022	Wimbledon	Grass	(China) Zhang Shuai	(Czech Republic) Barbora Krejčíková (Czech Republic) Kateřina Siniaková	2–6, 4–6
Loss	2023	Wimbledon	Grass	(Australia) Storm Hunter	(Chinese Taipei) Hsieh Su-wei (Czech Republic) Barbora Strýcová	5–7, 4–6
Win	2024	Australian Open (2)	Hard	(Chinese Taipei) Hsieh Su-wei	(Ukraine) Lyudmyla Kichenok (Latvia) Jeļena Ostapenko	6–1, 7–5
Win	2025	Wimbledon (2)	Grass	Veronika Kudermetova	(Chinese Taipei) Hsieh Su-wei (Latvia) Jeļena Ostapenko	3–6, 6–2, 6–4
Win	2026	Australian Open (3)	Hard	(China) Zhang Shuai	(Kazakhstan) Anna Danilina (Serbia) Aleksandra Krunić	7–6^{(7–4)}, 6–4

== Other significant finals ==
=== Year-end championships ===
==== Doubles: 3 (2 titles, 1 runner-up) ====
Result	Year	Tournament	Surface	Partner	Opponents	Score
Loss	2021	WTA Finals, Mexico	Hard	(Chinese Taipei) Hsieh Su-wei	(Czech Republic) Barbora Krejčíková (Czech Republic) Kateřina Siniaková	3–6, 4–6
Win	2022	WTA Finals, United States	Hard (i)	Veronika Kudermetova	(Czech Republic) Barbora Krejčíková (Czech Republic) Kateřina Siniaková	6–2, 4–6, [11–9]
Win	2025	WTA Finals, Saudi Arabia (2)	Hard (i)	Veronika Kudermetova	(Hungary) Tímea Babos (Brazil) Luisa Stefani	7–6^{(7–4)}, 6–1

=== WTA 1000 tournaments ===
==== Doubles: 13 (7 titles, 6 runner-ups) ====
Result	Year	Tournament	Surface	Partner	Opponents	Score
Loss	2018	Cincinnati Open	Hard	(Netherlands) Demi Schuurs	(Czech Republic) Lucie Hradecká (Russia) Ekaterina Makarova	2–6, 5–7
Win	2018	Wuhan Open	Hard	(Netherlands) Demi Schuurs	(Czech Republic) Andrea Sestini Hlaváčková (Czech Republic) Barbora Strýcová	6–3, 6–3
Win	2019	Indian Wells Open	Hard	(Belarus) Aryna Sabalenka	(Czech Republic) Barbora Krejčíková (Czech Republic) Kateřina Siniaková	6–3, 6–2
Win	2019	Miami Open	Hard	(Belarus) Aryna Sabalenka	(Australia) Samantha Stosur (China) Zhang Shuai	7–6^{(7–5)}, 6–2
Loss	2019	Wuhan Open	Hard	(Belarus) Aryna Sabalenka	(China) Duan Yingying (Russia) Veronika Kudermetova	6–7^{(3–7)}, 2–6
Win	2021	Indian Wells Open (2)	Hard	(Chinese Taipei) Hsieh Su-wei	(Russia) Veronika Kudermetova (Kazakhstan) Elena Rybakina	7–6^{(7–1)}, 6–3
Loss	2022	Qatar Open	Hard	(Russia) Veronika Kudermetova	(United States) Coco Gauff (United States) Jessica Pegula	6–3, 5–7, [5–10]
Loss	2022	Miami Open	Hard	Veronika Kudermetova	(Germany) Laura Siegemund; Vera Zvonareva	6–7^{(3–7)}, 5–7
Win	2023	Italian Open	Clay	(Australia) Storm Hunter	(United States) Coco Gauff (United States) Jessica Pegula	6–4, 6–4
Win	2023	Guadalajara Open	Hard	(Australia) Storm Hunter	(Canada) Gabriela Dabrowski (New Zealand) Erin Routliffe	3–6, 6–2, [10–4]
Win	2024	Indian Wells Open (3)	Hard	(Chinese Taipei) Hsieh Su-wei	(Australia) Storm Hunter (Czech Republic) Kateřina Siniaková	6–3, 6–4
Loss	2025	Madrid Open	Clay	Veronika Kudermetova	(Romania) Sorana Cîrstea; Anna Kalinskaya	7–6^{(12–10)}, 2–6, [10–12]
Loss	2025	Italian Open	Clay	Veronika Kudermetova	(Italy) Sara Errani (Italy) Jasmine Paolini	4–6, 5–7

== WTA Tour finals ==
=== Singles: 17 (10 titles, 7 runner-ups) ===
Legend Premier / WTA 500 (2–1) International / WTA 250 (8–6)	Finals by surface Hard (7–4) Clay (2–3) Grass (1–0)	Finals by setting Outdoor (9–6) Indoor (1–1)

Result	W–L	Date	Tournament	Tier	Surface	Opponent	Score
Win	1–0	Jan 2017	Hobart International, Australia	International	Hard	(Romania) Monica Niculescu	6–3, 6–1
Loss	1–1	Apr 2017	İstanbul Cup, Turkey	International	Clay	(Ukraine) Elina Svitolina	2–6, 4–6
Win	2–1	Jan 2018	Hobart International, Australia (2)	International	Hard	(Romania) Mihaela Buzărnescu	6–1, 4–6, 6–3
Win	3–1	Apr 2018	Ladies Open Lugano, Switzerland	International	Clay	(Belarus) Aryna Sabalenka	7–5, 6–2
Win	4–1	May 2018	Rabat Grand Prix, Morocco	International	Clay	(Australia) Ajla Tomljanović	6–2, 7–6^{(7–4)}
Win	5–1	Feb 2019	Qatar Ladies Open, Qatar	Premier	Hard	(Romania) Simona Halep	3–6, 6–4, 6–3
Loss	5–2	Aug 2020	Prague Open, Czech Republic	International	Clay	(Romania) Simona Halep	2–6, 5–7
Loss	5–3	Nov 2020	Ladies Linz, Austria	International	Hard (i)	(Belarus) Aryna Sabalenka	5–7, 2–6
Win	6–3	Feb 2021	Gippsland Trophy, Australia	WTA 500	Hard	(Estonia) Kaia Kanepi	6–4, 6–1
Loss	6–4	Apr 2021	İstanbul Cup, Turkey	WTA 250	Clay	(Romania) Sorana Cîrstea	1–6, 6–7^{(3–7)}
Win	7–4	Oct 2022	Jasmin Open, Tunisia	WTA 250	Hard	(France) Alizé Cornet	6–2, 6–0
Win	8–4	Oct 2023	Jasmin Open, Tunisia (2)	WTA 250	Hard	(Italy) Jasmine Paolini	6–3, 6–0
Loss	8–5	Jan 2024	Hobart International, Australia	WTA 250	Hard	(United States) Emma Navarro	1–6, 6–4, 5–7
Loss	8–6	Jan 2025	Hobart International, Australia	WTA 250	Hard	(United States) McCartney Kessler	4–6, 6–3, 0–6
Win	9–6	Feb 2025	Singapore Open, Singapore	WTA 250	Hard (i)	(United States) Ann Li	6–1, 6–4
Win	10–6	Jun 2025	Libéma Open, Netherlands	WTA 250	Grass	(Romania) Elena-Gabriela Ruse	6–3, 7–6^{(7–3)}
Loss	10–7	Aug 2026	Monterrey Open, Mexico	WTA 500	Hard	(France) Diane Parry	4–6, 6–0, 3–6

=== Doubles: 38 (24 titles, 14 runner-ups) ===
Legend Grand Slam (6–2) WTA Finals (2–1) Premier M & Premier 5 / WTA 1000 (7–6) Premier / WTA 500 (2–1) International / WTA 250 (7–4)	Finals by surface Hard (17–5) Clay (3–4) Grass (4–5)	Finals by setting Outdoor (21–14) Indoor (3–0)

Result	W–L	Date	Tournament	Tier	Surface	Partner	Opponents	Score
Win	1–0	Jan 2016	Auckland Open, New Zealand	International	Hard	(Belgium) An-Sophie Mestach	(Montenegro) Danka Kovinić (Czech Republic) Barbora Strýcová	2–6, 6–3, [10–5]
Loss	1–1	Apr 2017	İstanbul Cup, Turkey	International	Clay	(United States) Nicole Melichar	(Slovenia) Dalila Jakupovic (Ukraine) Nadiia Kichenok	6–7^{(6–8)}, 2–6
Loss	1–2	Jul 2017	Bucharest Open, Romania	International	Clay	(Netherlands) Demi Schuurs	(Romania) Irina Camelia Begu (Romania) Raluca Olaru	3–6, 3–6
Win	2–2	Sep 2017	Guangzhou Open, China	International	Hard	(Netherlands) Demi Schuurs	(Australia) Monique Adamczak (Australia) Storm Sanders	6–2, 6–3
Win	3–2	Jan 2018	Hobart International, Australia	International	Hard	(Netherlands) Demi Schuurs	(Ukraine) Lyudmyla Kichenok (Japan) Makoto Ninomiya	6–2, 6–2
Win	4–2	Apr 2018	Ladies Open Lugano, Switzerland	International	Clay	(Belgium) Kirsten Flipkens	(Belarus) Vera Lapko (Belarus) Aryna Sabalenka	6–1, 6–3
Win	5–2	Jun 2018	Rosmalen Open, Netherlands	International	Grass	(Netherlands) Demi Schuurs	(Netherlands) Kiki Bertens (Belgium) Kirsten Flipkens	3–3 retired
Loss	5–3	Jun 2018	Birmingham Classic, United Kingdom	Premier	Grass	(Netherlands) Demi Schuurs	(Hungary) Tímea Babos (France) Kristina Mladenovic	6–4, 3–6, [8–10]
Loss	5–4	Aug 2018	Cincinnati Open, United States	Premier 5	Hard	(Netherlands) Demi Schuurs	(Czech Republic) Lucie Hradecká (Russia) Ekaterina Makarova	2–6, 5–7
Win	6–4	Sep 2018	Wuhan Open, China	Premier 5	Hard	(Netherlands) Demi Schuurs	(Czech Republic) Andrea Sestini Hlaváčková (Czech Republic) Barbora Strýcová	6–3, 6–3
Win	7–4	Mar 2019	Indian Wells Open, United States	Premier M	Hard	(Belarus) Aryna Sabalenka	(Czech Republic) Barbora Krejčíková (Czech Republic) Kateřina Siniaková	6–3, 6–2
Win	8–4	Mar 2019	Miami Open, United States	Premier M	Hard	(Belarus) Aryna Sabalenka	(Australia) Samantha Stosur (China) Zhang Shuai	7–6^{(7–5)}, 6–2
Win	9–4	Sep 2019	US Open, United States	Grand Slam	Hard	(Belarus) Aryna Sabalenka	(Belarus) Victoria Azarenka (Australia) Ashleigh Barty	7–5, 7–5
Loss	9–5	Sep 2019	Wuhan Open, China	Premier 5	Hard	(Belarus) Aryna Sabalenka	(China) Duan Yingying (Russia) Veronika Kudermetova	6–7^{(3–7)}, 2–6
Win	10–5	Oct 2020	Ostrava Open, Czech Republic	Premier	Hard (i)	(Belarus) Aryna Sabalenka	(Canada) Gabriela Dabrowski (Brazil) Luisa Stefani	6–1, 6–3
Win	11–5	Feb 2021	Australian Open, Australia	Grand Slam	Hard	(Belarus) Aryna Sabalenka	(Czech Republic) Barbora Krejčíková (Czech Republic) Kateřina Siniaková	6–2, 6–3
Win	12–5	Apr 2021	İstanbul Cup, Turkey	WTA 250	Clay	(Russia) Veronika Kudermetova	(Japan) Nao Hibino (Japan) Makoto Ninomiya	6–1, 6–1
Win	13–5	Jul 2021	Wimbledon, United Kingdom	Grand Slam	Grass	(Chinese Taipei) Hsieh Su-wei	(Russia) Veronika Kudermetova (Russia) Elena Vesnina	3–6, 7–5, 9–7
Win	14–5	Oct 2021	Indian Wells Open, United States (2)	WTA 1000	Hard	(Chinese Taipei) Hsieh Su-wei	(Russia) Veronika Kudermetova (Kazakhstan) Elena Rybakina	7–6^{(7–1)}, 6–3
Loss	14–6	Nov 2021	WTA Finals, Mexico	Finals	Hard	(Chinese Taipei) Hsieh Su-wei	(Czech Republic) Barbora Krejčíková (Czech Republic) Kateřina Siniaková	3–6, 4–6
Win	15–6	Feb 2022	Dubai Championships, UAE	WTA 500	Hard	(Russia) Veronika Kudermetova	(Ukraine) Lyudmyla Kichenok (Latvia) Jeļena Ostapenko	6–1, 6–3
Loss	15–7	Feb 2022	Qatar Ladies Open, Qatar	WTA 1000	Hard	(Russia) Veronika Kudermetova	(United States) Coco Gauff (United States) Jessica Pegula	6–3, 5–7, [5–10]
Loss	15–8	Apr 2022	Miami Open, United States	WTA 1000	Hard	Veronika Kudermetova	(Germany) Laura Siegemund; Vera Zvonareva	6–7^{(3–7)}, 5–7
Loss	15–9	Jun 2022	Rosmalen Open, Netherlands	WTA 250	Grass	Veronika Kudermetova	(Australia) Ellen Perez (Slovenia) Tamara Zidanšek	3–6, 7–5, [10–12]
Loss	15–10	Jun 2022	Birmingham Classic, United Kingdom	WTA 250	Grass	(China) Zhang Shuai	(Ukraine) Lyudmyla Kichenok (Latvia) Jeļena Ostapenko	walkover
Loss	15–11	Jul 2022	Wimbledon, United Kingdom	Grand Slam	Grass	(China) Zhang Shuai	(Czech Republic) Barbora Krejčíková (Czech Republic) Kateřina Siniaková	2–6, 4–6
Win	16–11	Nov 2022	WTA Finals, United States	Finals	Hard (i)	Veronika Kudermetova	(Czech Republic) Barbora Krejčíková (Czech Republic) Kateřina Siniaková	6–2, 4–6, [11–9]
Win	17–11	May 2023	Italian Open, Italy	WTA 1000	Clay	(Australia) Storm Hunter	(United States) Coco Gauff (United States) Jessica Pegula	6–4, 6–4
Loss	17–12	Jul 2023	Wimbledon, United Kingdom	Grand Slam	Grass	(Australia) Storm Hunter	(Chinese Taipei) Hsieh Su-wei (Czech Republic) Barbora Strýcová	5–7, 4–6
Win	18–12	Sep 2023	Guadalajara Open, Mexico	WTA 1000	Hard	(Australia) Storm Hunter	(Canada) Gabriela Dabrowski (New Zealand) Erin Routliffe	3–6, 6–2, [10–4]
Win	19–12	Jan 2024	Australian Open, Australia (2)	Grand Slam	Hard	(Chinese Taipei) Hsieh Su-wei	(Ukraine) Lyudmyla Kichenok (Latvia) Jeļena Ostapenko	6–1, 7–5
Win	20–12	Mar 2024	Indian Wells Open, United States (3)	WTA 1000	Hard	(Chinese Taipei) Hsieh Su-wei	(Australia) Storm Hunter (Czech Republic) Kateřina Siniaková	6–3, 6–4
Win	21–12	Jun 2024	Birmingham Classic, United Kingdom	WTA 250	Grass	(Chinese Taipei) Hsieh Su-wei	(Japan) Miyu Kato (China) Zhang Shuai	6–1, 6–3
Loss	21–13	Apr 2025	Madrid Open, Spain	WTA 1000	Clay	Veronika Kudermetova	(Romania) Sorana Cîrstea; Anna Kalinskaya	7–6^{(12–10)}, 2–6, [10–12]
Loss	21–14	May 2025	Italian Open, Italy	WTA 1000	Clay	Veronika Kudermetova	(Italy) Sara Errani (Italy) Jasmine Paolini	4–6, 5–7
Win	22–14	Jul 2025	Wimbledon, United Kingdom (2)	Grand Slam	Grass	Veronika Kudermetova	(Chinese Taipei) Hsieh Su-wei (Latvia) Jeļena Ostapenko	3–6, 6–2, 6–4
Win	23–14	Nov 2025	WTA Finals, Saudi Arabia (2)	Finals	Hard (i)	Veronika Kudermetova	(Hungary) Tímea Babos (Brazil) Luisa Stefani	7–6^{(7–4)}, 6–1
Win	24–14	Jan 2026	Australian Open, Australia (3)	Grand Slam	Hard	(China) Zhang Shuai	(Kazakhstan) Anna Danilina (Serbia) Aleksandra Krunić	7–6^{(7–4)}, 6–4

== WTA 125 finals ==
Mertens made her debut at the WTA Challenger Tour at the Taipei Open in November 2015, where she also reached final in doubles. She lost in that final alongside Marina Melnikova, but year later she won her first doubles title at the Open de Limoges, partnering with Mandy Minella.

=== Doubles: 2 (1 title, 1 runner-up) ===
Result	W–L	Date	Tournament	Surface	Partner	Opponents	Score
Loss	0–1	Nov 2015	Taipei Open, Taiwan	Carpet (i)	(Russia) Marina Melnikova	(Japan) Kanae Hisami (Japan) Kotomi Takahata	1–6, 2–6
Win	1–1	Nov 2016	Open de Limoges, France	Hard (i)	(Luxembourg) Mandy Minella	(United Kingdom) Anna Smith (Czech Republic) Renata Voráčová	6–4, 6–4

== ITF Circuit finals ==
Mertens made her ITF Women's Circuit debut in 2010. Since then, she reached 13 singles finals, winning 11 of them. In doubles, she done even better, with 13 titles out of the 23 finals that she reached. In Singles, she won two $50/60k titles, while in doubles she won four $50/60K titles and played two $70K/80k finals.

=== Singles: 13 (11 titles, 2 runner-ups) ===
Legend $50,000 tournaments (2–0) $25,000 tournaments (2–1) $10,000 tournaments (7–1)	Finals by surface Hard (10–1) Clay (1–1)

Result	W–L	Date	Tournament	Tier	Surface	Opponent	Score
Win	1–0	Apr 2013	ITF Sharm El Sheikh, Egypt	10,000	Hard	(Spain) Arabela Fernández Rabener	6–4, 6–3
Win	2–0	Oct 2013	ITF Sharm El Sheikh, Egypt	10,000	Hard	(Belgium) Klaartje Liebens	2–6, 6–2, 6–4
Win	3–0	Oct 2013	ITF Sharm El Sheikh, Egypt	10,000	Hard	(Belgium) Klaartje Liebens	6–7^{(0–7)}, 6–1, 6–3
Win	4–0	Dec 2013	ITF İstanbul, Turkey	10,000	Hard (i)	(Denmark) Karen Barbat	7–5, 4–6, 6–4
Win	5–0	Mar 2014	ITF Ponta Delgada, Portugal	10,000	Hard	(Portugal) Bárbara Luz	6–2, 6–4
Loss	5–1	Jun 2014	ITF Hilton Head, United States	10,000	Hard	(United States) Caitlin Whoriskey	3–6, 6–7^{(5–7)}
Win	6–1	Jun 2014	ITF El Paso, United States	25,000	Hard	(United States) Ashley Weinhold	6–1, 3–6, 6–4
Win	7–1	Jun 2014	ITF Bangkok, Thailand	10,000	Hard	(Chinese Taipei) Lee Pei-chi	6–3, 6–2
Win	8–1	Jul 2014	ITF Bangkok, Thailand	10,000	Hard	(Thailand) Nungnadda Wannasuk	6–1, 6–1
Loss	8–2	Jan 2015	ITF Daytona Beach, United States	25,000	Clay	(Russia) Daria Kasatkina	2–6, 6–4, 0–6
Win	9–2	May 2015	ITF Pula, Italy	25,000	Clay	(Spain) Yvonne Cavallé Reimers	7–6^{(8–6)}, 6–4
Win	10–2	Oct 2015	Abierto Victoria, Mexico	50,000	Hard	(France) Amandine Hesse	6–4, 6–3
Win	11–2	Sep 2016	Atlanta Open, United States	50,000	Hard	(United States) Melanie Oudin	6–4, 6–2

=== Doubles: 23 (13 titles, 10 runner-ups) ===
Legend $75,000 tournaments (0–2) $50,000 tournaments (4–2) $25,000 tournaments (4–3) $10/15,000 tournaments (5–3)	Finals by surface Hard (10–8) Clay (3–2)

Result	W–L	Date	Tournament	Tier	Surface	Partner	Opponents	Score
Win	1–0	Apr 2013	ITF Sharm El Sheikh, Egypt	10,000	Hard	(Belgium) Justine De Sutter	(Russia) Alina Mikheeva (Canada) Jillian O'Neill	6–1, 6–4
Win	2–0	Oct 2013	ITF Sharm El Sheikh, Egypt	10,000	Hard	(Poland) Sandra Zaniewska	(Ukraine) Valeriya Strakhova (Brazil) Karina Venditti	6–4, 6–7^{(5–7)}, [12–10]
Win	3–0	Dec 2013	ITF İstanbul, Turkey	10,000	Hard (i)	(Turkey) İpek Soylu	(Japan) Yuuki Tanaka (Russia) Ekaterina Yashina	6–0, 7–6^{(7–3)}
Loss	3–1	Jan 2014	ITF Tinajo, Spain	10,000	Clay	(Spain) Arabela Fernández Rabener	(Italy) Deborah Chiesa (Colombia) Yuliana Lizarazo	2–6, 6–3, [11–13]
Loss	3–2	Feb 2014	ITF Tinajo, Spain	10,000	Hard	(Spain) Arabela Fernández Rabener	(Japan) Hikari Yamamoto (Romania) Ioana Loredana Roșca	1–6, 1–6
Loss	3–3	Feb 2014	ITF Tinajo, Spain	10,000	Hard	(Netherlands) Bernice van de Velde	(China) Lu Jiajing (Canada) Petra Januskova	5–7, 7–5, [6–10]
Win	4–3	Mar 2014	ITF Ponta Delgada, Portugal	10,000	Hard	(Belarus) Sviatlana Pirazhenka	(Czech Republic) Tereza Malíková (Czech Republic) Pernilla Mendesová	6–1, 6–2
Win	5–3	Aug 2014	ITF Westende, Belgium	25,000	Hard	(Belgium) Ysaline Bonaventure	(Russia) Marina Melnikova (Russia) Evgeniya Rodina	6–2, 6–2
Win	6–3	Aug 2014	ITF Wanfercée-Baulet, Belgium	15,000	Clay	(Netherlands) Demi Schuurs	(Argentina) Tatiana Búa (Chile) Daniela Seguel	6–2, 6–3
Loss	6–4	Oct 2014	Internacional de Monterrey, México	50,000	Hard	(Netherlands) Arantxa Rus	(Spain) Lourdes Domínguez Lino (Colombia) Mariana Duque	3–6, 6–7^{(4–7)}
Win	7–4	Nov 2014	ITF Sharm El Sheikh, Egypt	25,000	Hard	(Italy) Alice Matteucci	(Romania) Ioana Loredana Roșca (Bulgaria) Julia Terziyska	6–7^{(1–7)}, 7–6^{(7–4)}, [10–6]
Loss	7–5	Nov 2014	New Delhi Open, India	50,000	Hard	(Russia) Marina Melnikova	(China) Liu Chang (China) Lu Jiajing	3–6, 0–6
Loss	7–6	Jan 2015	ITF Daytona Beach, United States	25,000	Clay	(Netherlands) Arantxa Rus	(United States) Sanaz Marand (United States) Jan Abaza	4–6, 6–3, [6–10]
Win	8–6	Jul 2015	ITF Denain, France	25,000	Clay	(Turkey) İpek Soylu	(Switzerland) Xenia Knoll (Argentina) Florencia Molinero	7–6^{(7–3)}, 6–3
Win	9–6	Aug 2015	ITF Koksijde, Belgium	25,000	Clay	(Netherlands) Demi Schuurs	(Poland) Justyna Jegiołka (France) Sherazad Reix	6–3, 6–2
Win	10–6	Sep 2015	Internacional de Monterrey, México	50,000	Hard	(Belgium) Ysaline Bonaventure	(Russia) Marina Melnikova (Luxembourg) Mandy Minella	6–4, 3–6, [11–9]
Win	11–6	Oct 2015	Abierto Victoria, Mexico	50,000	Hard	(Belgium) Ysaline Bonaventure	(Argentina) María Irigoyen (Czech Republic) Barbora Krejčíková	6–4, 4–6, [10–6]
Loss	11–7	Nov 2015	Dubai Tennis Challenge, UAE	75,000	Hard	(Turkey) İpek Soylu	(Turkey) Çağla Büyükakçay (Greece) Maria Sakkari	6–7^{(6–8)}, 4–6
Win	12–7	Jan 2016	Open Andrézieux-Bouthéon, France	50,000	Hard (i)	(Belgium) An-Sophie Mestach	(Switzerland) Viktorija Golubic (Switzerland) Xenia Knoll	6–4, 3–6, [10–7]
Loss	12–8	Apr 2016	ITF Changwon, South Korea	25,000	Hard	(China) Lu Jiajing	(South Korea) Han Na-lae (South Korea) Yoo Mi	6–4, 3–6, [7–10]
Loss	12–9	Aug 2016	Landisville Tennis Challenge, United States	25,000	Hard	(Belgium) An-Sophie Mestach	(United Kingdom) Freya Christie (United Kingdom) Laura Robson	3–6, 4–6
Loss	12–10	Sep 2016	Albuquerque Championships, United States	75,000	Hard	(Luxembourg) Mandy Minella	(Netherlands) Michaëlla Krajicek (United States) Maria Sanchez	2–6, 4–6
Win	13–10	Oct 2016	Abierto Tampico, Mexico	50,000+H	Hard	(Romania) Mihaela Buzărnescu	(United States) Usue Maitane Arconada (United Kingdom) Katie Swan	6–0, 6–2

== WTA Tour career earnings ==
Current after the 2026 Wuhan Open

Year	Grand Slam titles	WTA titles	Total titles	Earnings ($)	Money list rank
2015	0	0	0	61,272	219
2016	0	0	0	140,327	157
2017	0	1	1	549,215	64
2018	0	3	3	2,364,006	17
2019	0	1	1	2,796,400	12
2020	0	0	0	1,123,558	10
2021	0	1	1	2,098,133	9
2022	0	1	1	1,763,307	15
2023	0	1	1	1,854,209	17
2024	0	0	0	2,783,414	9
2025	0	2	2	2,895,029	10
2026	0	0	0	3,360,347	11
Career	0	10	10	21,155,310	27

== Career Grand Slam statistics ==
=== Career Grand Slam seedings ===
The tournaments won by Mertens are in boldface, and advanced into finals by Mertens are in italics.

==== Singles ====
Year	Australian Open	French Open	Wimbledon	US Open
2015	did not play	did not play	did not qualify	did not qualify
2016	did not qualify	did not qualify	did not qualify	not seeded
2017	did not play	not seeded	not seeded	not seeded
2018	not seeded	16th	15th	15th
2019	12th	20th	21st	25th
2020	16th	16th	cancelled	16th
2021	18th	14th	13th	15th
2022	19th	31st	24th	32nd
2023	26th	28th	28th	32nd
2024	25th	25th	not seeded	33rd
2025	not seeded	24th	24th	19th
2026	21st	23rd	25th	23rd

==== Doubles ====
Year	Australian Open	French Open	Wimbledon	US Open
2016	did not play	did not play	qualifier	did not play
2017	not seeded	not seeded	not seeded	not seeded
2018	not seeded	12th	8th	7th
2019	not seeded	6th	6th	**4th (1)**
2020	3rd	3rd	cancelled	2nd
2021	**2nd (2)**	1st	**3rd (3)**	1st
2022	3rd	2nd	1st (1)	1st
2023	4th	3rd	3rd (2)	2nd
2024	**2nd (4)**	1st	1st	2nd
2025	6th			

=== Best Grand Slam results details ===
Grand Slam winners are in boldface, and runner–ups are in italics.

**Australian Open**
**2018 Australian Open (Not seeded)**
Round	Opponent	Rank	Score
1R	(Slovakia) Viktória Kužmová (Q)	125	6–2, 6–1
2R	(Australia) Daria Gavrilova (23)	23	7–5, 6–3
3R	(France) Alizé Cornet	42	7–5, 6–4
4R	(Croatia) Petra Martić	81	7–6^{(7–5)}, 7–5
QF	(Ukraine) Elina Svitolina (4)	4	6–4, 6–0
SF	**(Denmark) Caroline Wozniacki (2)**	2	3–6, 6–7^{(2–7)}

**Wimbledon Championships**
**2019 Wimbledon Championships (21st)**
Round	Opponent	Rank	Score
1R	(France) Fiona Ferro	100	6–2, 6–0
2R	(Romania) Monica Niculescu (WC)	111	7–5, 6–0
3R	(China) Wang Qiang (15)	15	6–2, 6–7^{(9–11)}, 6–4
4R	(Czech Republic) Barbora Strýcová	54	6–4, 5–7, 2–6
**2022 Wimbledon Championships (24th)**
Round	Opponent	Rank	Score
1R	(Colombia) Camila Osorio	63	1–6, 6–2, 4–2 ret.
2R	(Hungary) Panna Udvardy	100	3–6, 7–6, 7–5
3R	(Germany) Angelique Kerber (15)	19	6–4, 7–5
4R	(Tunisia) Ons Jabeur (3)	2	6–7, 4–6

**French Open**
**2018 French Open (16th)**
Round	Opponent	Rank	Score
1R	(United States) Varvara Lepchenko	92	6–7^{(9–7)}, 7–6^{(7–4)}, 6–0
2R	(United Kingdom) Heather Watson	80	6–3, 6–4
3R	(Australia) Daria Gavrilova (24)	25	6–3, 6–1
4R	**(Romania) Simona Halep (1)**	**1**	2–6, 1–6
**2022 French Open (31st)**
Round	Opponent	Rank	Score
1R	(Romania) Elena-Gabriela Ruse	51	6–3, 6–1
2R	(Czech Republic) Marie Bouzková	69	w/o
3R	(Russia) Varvara Gracheva	71	6–2, 6–3
4R	(United States) Coco Gauff (18)	23	4–6, 0–6

**US Open**
**2019 US Open (25th)**
Round	Opponent	Rank	Score
1R	(Switzerland) Jil Teichmann	60	6–2, 6–2
2R	(Czech Republic) Kristýna Plíšková	86	6–2, 6–2
3R	(Germany) Andrea Petkovic	88	6–3, 6–3
4R	(United States) Kristie Ahn (WC)	141	6–1, 6–1
QF	**(Canada) Bianca Andreescu (15)**	15	6–3, 2–6, 3–6
**2020 US Open (16th)**
Round	Opponent	Rank	Score
1R	(Germany) Laura Siegemund	64	6–2, 6–2
2R	(Spain) Sara Sorribes Tormo	82	6–3, 7–5
3R	(United States) Caty McNally	124	7–5, 6–1
4R	(United States) Sofia Kenin (2)	4	6–3, 6–3
QF	(Belarus) Victoria Azarenka	27	1–6, 0–6

== Wins against top 10 players ==
No.	Player	Rk	Event	Surface	Rd	Score	Rk	Years	Ref
1.	(Slovakia) Dominika Cibulková	10	China Open, China	Hard	1R	7–6^{(7–4)}, 6–1	38	2017	
2.	(Ukraine) Elina Svitolina	4	Australian Open, Australia	Hard	QF	6–4, 6–0	37	2018	
3.	(United States) Sloane Stephens	3	Cincinnati Open, United States	Hard	3R	7–6^{(10–8)}, 6–2	14	2018	
4.	(Netherlands) Kiki Bertens	8	Qatar Open, Qatar	Hard	QF	6–4, 6–3	21	2019	
5.	(Germany) Angelique Kerber	6	Qatar Open, Qatar	Hard	SF	6–4, 2–6, 6–1	21	2019	
6.	(Romania) Simona Halep	3	Qatar Open, Qatar	Hard	F	3–6, 6–4, 6–3	21	2019	
7.	(United States) Sofia Kenin	4	US Open, United States	Hard	4R	6–3, 6–3	18	2020	
8.	(Ukraine) Elina Svitolina	5	Gippsland Trophy, Australia	Hard	QF	6–3, 5–7, [10–6]	20	2021	
9.	(Romania) Simona Halep	3	Madrid Open, Spain	Clay	3R	4–6, 7–5, 7–5	16	2021	
10.	Daria Kasatkina	8	Miami Open, United States	Hard	2R	4–6, 6–2, 6–2	39	2023	
11.	(United States) Jessica Pegula	3	French Open, France	Clay	3R	6–1, 6–3	28	2023	
12.	(United States) Jessica Pegula	4	Italian Open, Italy	Clay	3R	7–5, 6–1	24	2025	
13.	(Italy) Jasmine Paolini	8	Italian Open, Italy	Clay	3R	4–6,7–6^{(7–5)}, 6–3	22	2026	
14.	(Kazakhstan) Elena Rybakina	2	Wimbledon, United Kingdom	Grass	3R	7–6^{(7–4)}, 6–1	27	2026	
15.	(United States) Coco Gauff	4	China Open, China	Hard	4R	6–3, 6–3	19	2026	
16.	(Poland) Iga Swiatek	9	China Open, China	Hard	QF	7-6^{(7–0)}, 6–3	19	2026	

- Key: (Rk) first use, opponent rank; (Rd) round; (Rk) 2nd use, player rank; (Ref) reference; (F) final; (SF) semifinal; (QF) quarterfinal; (#R) rounds 4, 3, 2, 1; (RR) round-robin stage; (Q#) qualifying rounds or stages (3), 2, 1.

== Double bagel matches ==
Result	Year	W–L	Tournament	Tier	Surface	Opponent	Rank	Rd	EMR
Win	2013	1–0	ITF Sharm El Sheikh, Egypt	10,000	Hard	(Egypt) Sara Sherif (WC)	–	1R	No. 751
Win	2013	2–0	ITF Sharm El Sheikh, Egypt	10,000	Hard	(Belarus) Yulia Shupenia	–	2R	No. 751
Win	2014	3–0	ITF Polta Delgada, Portugal	10,000	Hard	(Portugal) Marta Magalhaes (WC)	–	1R	No. 501
Win	2014	4–0	ITF Hilton Head Island, U.S.	10,000	Hard	(United States) Terri Fleming (Q)	–	QF	No. 434
Win	2015	5–0	ITF Le Havre, France	10,000	Clay	(Germany) Justine Ozga	No. 677	2R	No. 218
Win	2016	6–0	Abierto Tampico, Mexico	50,000+H	Hard	(Mexico) Karla De La Luz Montalvo (LL)	–	1R	No. 132
Win	2018	7–0	Morocco Open, Morocco	International	Clay	(Slovakia) Kristína Kučová	No. 281	1R	No. 19
Win	2023	8–0	Qatar Open, Qatar	WTA 500	Hard	(Qatar) Mubaraka Al-Naimi (WC)	–	Q1	No. 32

== Longest winning streaks ==
=== 13 match win streak (2018) ===
#	Tournament	Category	Start date	Surface	Rd	Opponent	Rank	Score
–	Miami Open	Premier Mandatory	20 March 2018	Hard	3R	(United Kingdom) Johanna Konta (11)	No. 14	2–6, 1–6
1	Ladies Open Lugano	International	9 April 2018	Clay	1R	(Luxembourg) Mandy Minella	No. 301	6–4, 6–1
2	Ladies Open Lugano	International	9 April 2018	Clay	2R	(Czech Republic) Markéta Vondroušová	No. 52	6–2, 5–7, 7–5
3	Ladies Open Lugano	International	9 April 2018	Clay	QF	(Germany) Mona Barthel	No. 68	6–4, 5–7, 7–6^{(7–0)}
4	Ladies Open Lugano	International	9 April 2018	Clay	SF	(Belarus) Vera Lapko (Q)	No. 130	6–1, 4–6, 6–4
5	Ladies Open Lugano	International	9 April 2018	Clay	F	(Belarus) Aryna Sabalenka	No. 61	7–5, 6–2
6	Fed Cup	Team	21 April 2018	Clay	RR	(Italy) Sara Errani	No. 91	6–3, 6–1
7	Fed Cup	Team	21 April 2018	Clay	RR	(Italy) Jasmine Paolini	No. 145	6–1, 7–5
8	Morocco Open	International	30 April 2018	Clay	1R	(Slovakia) Kristína Kučová	No. 281	6–0, 6–0
9	Morocco Open	International	30 April 2018	Clay	2R	(Germany) Laura Siegemund	No. 226	6–7^{(5–7)}, 6–0, 3–1 ret.
10	Morocco Open	International	30 April 2018	Clay	QF	(Italy) Sara Errani	No. 89	6–3, 6–1
11	Morocco Open	International	30 April 2018	Clay	SF	(Chinese Taipei) Hsieh Su-wei (8)	No. 60	6–0, 6–2
12	Morocco Open	International	30 April 2018	Clay	F	(Australia) Ajla Tomljanović	No. 96	6–2, 7–6^{(7–4)}
13	Madrid Open	Premier Mandatory	5 May 2018	Clay	1R	(Belgium) Alison Van Uytvanck	No. 47	6–4, 6–4
–	Madrid Open	Premier Mandatory	5 May 2018	Clay	2R	(Romania) Simona Halep (1)	No. 1	0–6, 3–6
