= Barbora Krejčíková career statistics =

Career finals
Discipline	Type	Won	Lost	Total
Singles	Grand Slam	2	0	2
Singles	WTA Finals (Note: Formerly known as: Virginia Slims Championships (until 1995); WTA Tour Championships (until 2014))	–	–	0
Singles	WTA 1000 (Note: Formerly known as: Category 4 & 5 & 6 (until 1990); Tier I (until 2009); WTA Premier Mandatory and 5 (until 2021))	1	1	2
Singles	WTA 500 (Note: Formerly known as: Category 3 (until 1990); Tier II (until 2009); WTA Premier (until 2021))	2	2	4
Singles	WTA 250 (Note: Formerly known as: Category 1 & 2 (until 1990); Tier III & IV & V (until 2009); WTA International (until 2021))	3	2	5
Singles	Olympics	–	–	0
Singles	Total	8	5	13
Doubles	Grand Slam	7	1	8
Doubles	WTA Finals	1	2	3
Doubles	WTA 1000	3	2	5
Doubles	WTA 500	2	2	4
Doubles	WTA 250	4	3	7
Doubles	Olympics	1	0	1
Doubles	Total	18	10	28
Mixed	Grand Slam	3	0	3
Mixed	Total	3	0	3

This is a list of the main career statistics of professional Czech tennis player Barbora Krejčíková. Across major singles, doubles, and mixed doubles events, Krejčíková has won 12 titles, two in singles, seven in doubles, and three in mixed doubles titles.

== Career achievements ==
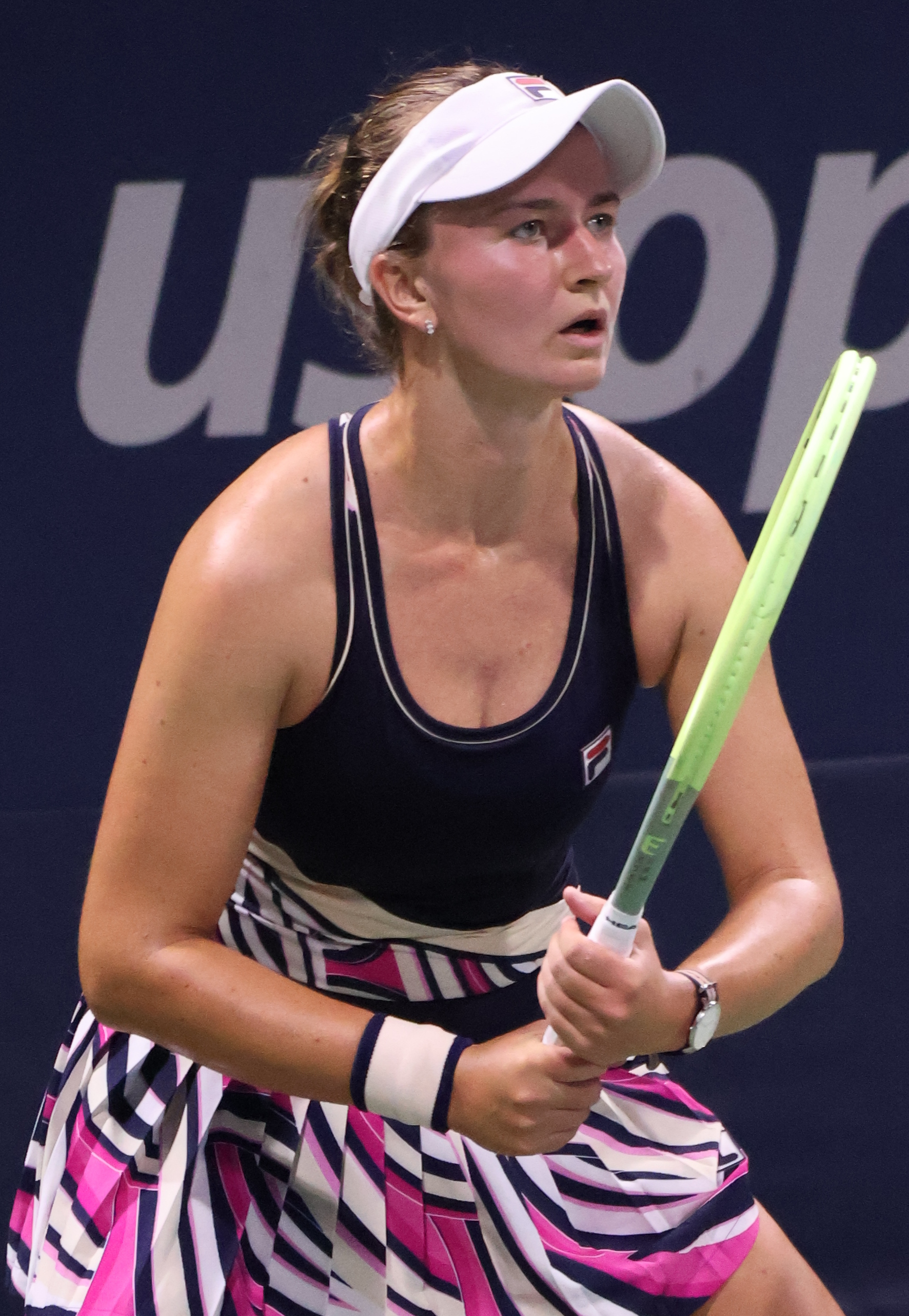
Krejcikova at the 2023 US Open

Until 2021, Krejčíková was mostly known for her results in doubles and mixed doubles. She made significant progress in singles during the 2021 season, when she won her first Women's Tennis Association (WTA) singles title, first major singles title and also being ranked as No. 3. The following year she had the chance to be world No. 1 after the Australian Open but she missed that opportunity. A month later, she climbed to place No. 2 as her career-highest. At the 2023 Dubai Championships, she won her first WTA 1000 title and in that way collected at least one title from all categories in either singles or doubles – only missing year-end championships title in singles. There she also achieved wins against the three highest ranked players on the WTA Ranking, becoming one of the few players to do so.

Despite focusing more in singles, Krejčíková continued to make significant results in doubles as well. After winning French Open and Wimbledon in doubles events in 2018, she became No. 1 doubles player. At the 2020 Tokyo Summer Olympics, postponed in 2021 due to COVID-19, she has won Gold medal in doubles event. In 2021, she also won WTA Finals. All mentioned doubles achievements she made alongside countrymate Kateřina Siniaková.

Despite strong results in the 2022–2023 seasons, Krejčíková experienced a significant loss in ranking in the middle of 2024 due to multiple reported injuries and illnesses. Surprisingly, seeded only 31st, she put on a dominant display of her all-court game to win the Women's Singles title at the 2024 Wimbledon Championships, beating five higher seeded players including Danielle Collins (11th), Jeļena Ostapenko (13th), Elena Rybakina (4th), and Jasmine Paolini (7th) along the way.

At the Grand Slam tournament-level, she has a total of 12 titles: two in singles, seven in doubles, and three in mixed doubles as of June 2026. She completed her "Career Grand Slam" in doubles by winning the 2022 US Open alongside Siniaková. By winning this title, she did not only collect all major titles but also achieved "Career Golden Slam" and "Career Super Slam" at the same time. Achieving this alongside Siniaková, they became the second women's pair (and the third and fourth women overall, after Gigi Fernández and Pam Shriver) to complete this goal.

== Performance timelines ==
Key
W	F	SF	QF	#R	RR	Q#	P#	DNQ	A	Z#	PO	G	S	B	NMS	NTI	P	NH

(W) winner; (F) finalist; (SF) semifinalist; (QF) quarterfinalist; (#R) rounds 4, 3, 2, 1; (RR) round-robin stage; (Q#) qualification round; (P#) preliminary round; (DNQ) did not qualify; (A) absent; (Z#) Davis/Fed Cup Zonal Group (with number indication) or (PO) play-off; (G) gold, (S) silver or (B) bronze Olympic/Paralympic medal; (NMS) not a Masters tournament; (NTI) not a Tier I tournament; (P) postponed; (NH) not held; (SR) strike rate (events won / competed); (W–L) win–loss record.
To avoid confusion and double counting, these charts are updated at the conclusion of a tournament or when the player's participation has ended.

Only main-draw results in WTA Tour, Grand Slam tournaments, Billie Jean King Cup (Fed Cup), United Cup, Hopman Cup and Olympic Games are included in win–loss records.

=== Singles ===
Current through the 2026 US Open.

Tournament	2014	2015	2016	2017	2018	2019	2020	2021	2022	2023	2024	2025	2026	SR	W–L	Win%
Grand Slam tournaments
Australian Open	A	Q2	Q3	Q2	Q3	Q2	2R	2R	QF	4R	QF	A	1R	0 / 6	13–6	68%
French Open	A	Q2	A	A	1R	Q1	4R	W	1R	1R	1R	2R	1R	1 / 8	11–7	61%
Wimbledon	A	Q1	Q1	Q2	A	A	NH	4R	3R	2R	W	3R	4R	1 / 6	18–5	78%
US Open	Q3	Q1	A	Q1	Q1	Q2	A	QF	2R	1R	2R	QF	1R	0 / 6	10–6	63%
Win–Loss	0–0	0–0	0–0	0–0	0–1	0–0	4–2	15–3	7–4	4–4	12–3	7–3	3–4	2 / 26	52–24	68%
Year-end championships
WTA Finals	Did Not Qualify						NH	RR	DNQ	Alt	SF	DNQ		0 / 2	2–5	29%
WTA Elite Trophy	Did Not Qualify						Not Held			RR	Not Held			0 / 1	1–1	50%
National representation
Billie Jean King Cup	A	A	A	A	W	1R	RR (Note: Edition is split into the two years due to COVID-19.)		A	SF	A	A	A	1 / 4	1–2	33%
Summer Olympics	Not Held		A	Not Held				3R	Not Held		QF	Not Held		0 / 2	5–2	71%
WTA 1000 tournaments
Qatar Open	A	NTI	Q1	NTI	Q1	NTI	A	NTI	3R	NTI	A	A	A	0 / 1	1–1	50%
Dubai Championships	NTI	A	NTI	A	NTI	A	NTI	F	NTI	W	A	A	2R (Note: Withdrawal during the tournament not counted as a loss.)	1 / 3	12–1	92%
Indian Wells Open	A	A	A	A	Q2	A	NH	4R	A	4R	A	A	A	0 / 2	4–2	67%
Miami Open	A	A	A	A	Q2	A	NH	2R	A	4R	A	A	A	0 / 2	3–2	60%
Madrid Open	A	A	A	A	Q1	A	NH	1R	A	4R	2R	A	A	0 / 3	2–3	40%
Italian Open	A	A	A	A	A	A	A	3R	A	3R	A	A	2R	0 / 3	4–3	57%
Canadian Open	A	A	A	Q2	1R	Q1	NH	A	1R	A	A	1R	2R	0 / 4	0–4	0%
Cincinnati Open	A	A	A	A	A	A	A	QF	1R	1R	A	4R	2R	0 / 5	6–5	60%
China Open	A	A	A	A	A	A	Not Held			1R	2R	3R		0 / 3	2–3	40%
Wuhan Open	A	A	A	A	A	A	Not Held				2R	A		0 / 1	0–1	0%
Guadalajara Open	Not Held								1R	A	Not Tier I			0 / 1	0–1	0%
Win–Loss	0–0	0–0	0–0	0–0	0–1	0–0	0–0	13–6	1–4	13–6	0–3	5–3	2–3	1 / 28	34–26	59%
Career statistics
	2014	2015	2016	2017	2018	2019	2020	2021	2022	2023	2024	2025	2026	SR	W–L	Win%
Tournaments	1	1	5	4	3	1	5	17	17	20	16	10	13	Career total: 113		
Titles	0	0	0	0	0	0	0	3	2	2	1	0	1	Career total: 9		
Finals	0	0	0	1	0	0	0	4	3	4	1	0	2	Career total: 15		
Hard win–loss	1–1	0–1	1–2	0–1	1–2	0–0	5–3	26–14	21–10	24–12	9–9	11–5	11–7	6 / 68	110–67	62%
Clay win–loss	0–0	0–0	1–3	5–3	0–1	2–1	4–2	15–3	2–3	5–5	3–5	1–2	1–2	2 / 31	39–30	57%
Grass win–loss	0–0	0–0	0–0	0–0	0–0	0–0	0–0	3–1	2–2	5–2	9–2	4–2	7–2	1 / 14	30–11	73%
Overall win–loss	1–1	0–1	2–5	5–4	1–3	2–1	9–5	44–18	25–15	34–19	21–16	16–9	19–11	9 / 113	179–108	62%
Win %	50%	0%	29%	56%	25%	67%	64%	71%	63%	64%	57%	64%	63%	Career total: 62%		
Year-end ranking	187	187	251	126	203	135	65	5	21	10	10	65		$18,350,515		

=== Doubles ===
Current after the 2026 Wimbledon Championships.

Tournament	2014	2015	2016	2017	2018	2019	2020	2021	2022	2023	2024	2025	2026	SR	W–L	Win%
Grand Slam tournaments
Australian Open	A	A	2R	2R	3R	QF	SF	F	W	W	QF	A	A	2 / 9	31–7	82%
French Open	A	1R	SF	3R	W	1R	SF	W	A	1R	3R	A	A	2 / 9	24–7	77%
Wimbledon	A	A	1R	1R	W	SF	NH	QF	W	A	QF	3R	A	2 / 8	22–5	81%
US Open	A	A	QF	3R	SF	A	A	1R	W	2R	A	1R		1 / 7	16–6	73%
Win–loss	0–0	0–1	8–4	5–4	18–2	7–3	8–2	12–3	18–0	7–2	8–3	2–1	0–0	7 / 33	93–25	79%
Year-end championships
WTA Finals	Did Not Qualify				F	RR	NH	W	F	RR	DNQ			1 / 5	13–6	68%
National representation
Summer Olympics	Not Held		A	Not Held				G	Not Held		QF	NH		1 / 2	7–1	88%
Billie Jean King Cup	A	A	A	A	W	1R	RR		A	SF	A	A		1 / 4	3–2	60%
WTA 1000 tournaments
Qatar Open	A	NH	2R	NH	SF	NH	SF	NH	QF	NH	A	A	2R	0 / 5	8–5	62%
Dubai Championships	NH	A	NH	A	NH	A	NH	QF	NH	A	A	A	A	0 / 1	1–1	50%
Indian Wells Open	A	A	A	A	2R	F	NH	QF	A	W	A	A	A	1 / 4	12–3	80%
Miami Open	A	A	A	A	F	1R	NH	2R	A	A	A	A	A	0 / 3	5–3	63%
Madrid Open	A	A	A	1R	2R	QF	NH	W	A	A	F	A	A	1 / 5	10–4	71%
Italian Open	A	A	A	QF	1R	SF	A	QF	A	A	A	A	A	0 / 4	5–4	56%
Canadian Open	A	A	A	2R	2R	W	NH	A	2R	A	A	QF		1 / 5	7–4	64%
Cincinnati Open	A	A	A	A	QF	QF	A	SF	2R	QF	A	QF		0 / 6	6–5	55%
China Open	A	A	A	A	A	A	Not Held			2R	A	A		0 / 1	0–1	0%
Wuhan Open	A	A	A	A	A	A	Not Held				2R	A		0 / 1	1–1	50%
Guadalajara Open	Not Held								SF	A	Not Tier I			0 / 1	2–1	67%
Win–Loss	0–0	0–0	1–1	3–3	10–7	11–5	2–1	11–5	4–4	5–2	5–2	4–1	1–1	3 / 36	57–32	64%
Career statistics
	2014	2015	2016	2017	2018	2019	2020	2021	2022	2023	2024	2025	2026	SR	W–L	Win%
Tournaments	3	7	12	15	17	12	7	15	11	11	12	8	2	Career total: 132		
Titles	0	1	0	0	2	2	1	5	3	4	1	1	0	Career total: 20		
Finals	1	1	1	1	5	3	2	6	4	4	2	1	0	Career total: 31		
Hard win–loss	5–2	6–2	12–7	7–8	21–10	17–8	16–3	28–8	22–6	21–8	7–2	8–2	2–1	12 / 82	164–64	72%
Clay win–loss	0–1	0–4	7–4	9–6	8–4	4–3	6–2	11–1	0–0	0–1	13–3	0–1		3 / 35	52–29	64%
Grass win–loss	0–0	0–0	0–1	0–1	8–1	4–1	NH	1–1	7–1	4–0	4–3	3–1		3 / 15	32–10	76%
Overall win–loss	5–3	6–6	19–12	16–15	37–15	25–12	22–5	40–10	29–7	25–9	24–8	11–4	2–1	18 / 132	249–103	71%
Win %	63%	50%	61%	52%	71%	68%	81%	80%	81%	74%	75%	73%	67%	Career total: 71%		
Year-end ranking	121	87	26	54	1	13	7	2	3	13	29	67				

=== Mixed doubles ===
Tournament	2016	2017	2018	2019	2020	2021	...	2024	SR	W–L	Win%
Australian Open	A	1R	A	W	W	W		A	3 / 4	15–1	94%
French Open	A	1R	A	A	NH	QF		2R	0 / 3	2–2	50%
Wimbledon	2R	3R	A	A	NH	A		A	0 / 1	2–2	50%
US Open	QF	A	A	A	NH	A		QF	0 / 2	4–2	67%
Win–Loss	3–2	1–3	0–0	5–0	5–0	6–1		3–1	3 / 11	23–7	77%

== Grand Slam tournament finals ==
=== Singles: 2 (2 titles) ===
Result	Year	Tournament	Surface	Opponent	Score
Win	2021	French Open	Clay	(Russia) Anastasia Pavlyuchenkova	6–1, 2–6, 6–4
Win	2024	Wimbledon	Grass	(Italy) Jasmine Paolini	6–2, 2–6, 6–4

=== Doubles: 8 (7 titles, 1 runner-up) ===
Result	Year	Tournament	Surface	Partner	Opponents	Score
Win	2018	French Open	Clay	(Czech Republic) Kateřina Siniaková	(Japan) Eri Hozumi (Japan) Makoto Ninomiya	6–3, 6–3
Win	2018	Wimbledon	Grass	(Czech Republic) Kateřina Siniaková	(United States) Nicole Melichar (Czech Republic) Květa Peschke	6–4, 4–6, 6–0
Loss	2021	Australian Open	Hard	(Czech Republic) Kateřina Siniaková	(Belgium) Elise Mertens (Belarus) Aryna Sabalenka	2–6, 3–6
Win	2021	French Open (2)	Clay	(Czech Republic) Kateřina Siniaková	(United States) Bethanie Mattek-Sands (Poland) Iga Świątek	6–4, 6–2
Win	2022	Australian Open	Hard	(Czech Republic) Kateřina Siniaková	(Kazakhstan) Anna Danilina (Brazil) Beatriz Haddad Maia	6–7^{(3–7)}, 6–4, 6–4
Win	2022	Wimbledon (2)	Grass	(Czech Republic) Kateřina Siniaková	(Belgium) Elise Mertens (China) Zhang Shuai	6–2, 6–4
Win	2022	US Open	Hard	(Czech Republic) Kateřina Siniaková	(United States) Caty McNally (United States) Taylor Townsend	3–6, 7–5, 6–1
Win	2023	Australian Open (2)	Hard	(Czech Republic) Kateřina Siniaková	(Japan) Shuko Aoyama (Japan) Ena Shibahara	6–4, 6–3

=== Mixed doubles: 3 (3 titles) ===
Result	Year	Tournament	Surface	Partner	Opponents	Score
Win	2019	Australian Open	Hard	(United States) Rajeev Ram	(Australia) Astra Sharma (Australia) John-Patrick Smith	7–6^{(7–3)}, 6–1
Win	2020	Australian Open (2)	Hard	(Croatia) Nikola Mektić	(United States) Bethanie Mattek-Sands (United Kingdom) Jamie Murray	5–7, 6–4, [10–1]
Win	2021	Australian Open (3)	Hard	(United States) Rajeev Ram	(Australia) Samantha Stosur (Australia) Matthew Ebden	6–1, 6–4

== Other significant finals ==
=== Year-end championships ===
==== Doubles: 3 (1 title, 2 runner-ups) ====
Result	Year	Tournament	Surface	Partner	Opponents	Score
Loss	2018	WTA Finals Singapore	Hard (i)	(Czech Republic) Kateřina Siniaková	(Hungary) Tímea Babos (France) Kristina Mladenovic	4–6, 5–7
Win	2021	WTA Finals Guadalajara	Hard	(Czech Republic) Kateřina Siniaková	(Chinese Taipei) Hsieh Su-wei (Belgium) Elise Mertens	6–3, 6–4
Loss	2022	WTA Finals Fort Worth	Hard (i)	(Czech Republic) Kateřina Siniaková	Veronika Kudermetova (Belgium) Elise Mertens	2–6, 6–4, [9–11]

=== WTA 1000 tournaments ===
==== Singles: 2 (1 title, 1 runner-up) ====
Result	Year	Tournament	Surface	Opponent	Score
Loss	2021	Dubai Open	Hard	(Spain) Garbiñe Muguruza	6–7^{(6–8)}, 3–6
Win	2023	Dubai Open	Hard	(Poland) Iga Świątek	6–4, 6–2

==== Doubles: 6 (3 titles, 3 runner-ups) ====
Result	Year	Tournament	Surface	Partner	Opponents	Score
Loss	2018	Miami Open	Hard	(Czech Republic) Kateřina Siniaková	(Australia) Ashleigh Barty (United States) CoCo Vandeweghe	2–6, 1–6
Loss	2019	Indian Wells Open	Hard	(Czech Republic) Kateřina Siniaková	(Belgium) Elise Mertens (Belarus) Aryna Sabalenka	3–6, 2–6
Win	2019	Canadian Open	Hard	(Czech Republic) Kateřina Siniaková	(Germany) Anna-Lena Grönefeld (Netherlands) Demi Schuurs	7–5, 6–0
Win	2021	Madrid Open	Clay	(Czech Republic) Kateřina Siniaková	(Canada) Gabriela Dabrowski (Netherlands) Demi Schuurs	6–4, 6–3
Win	2023	Indian Wells Open	Hard	(Czech Republic) Kateřina Siniaková	(Brazil) Beatriz Haddad Maia (Germany) Laura Siegemund	6–1, 6–7^{(3–7)}, [10–7]
Loss	2024	Madrid Open	Clay	(Germany) Laura Siegemund	(Spain) Cristina Bucșa (Spain) Sara Sorribes Tormo	0–6, 2–6

=== Summer Olympics ===
==== Doubles: 1 (gold medal) ====
Result	Year	Tournament	Surface	Partner	Opponents	Score
Gold	2021	Tokyo Olympics	Hard	(Czech Republic) Kateřina Siniaková	(Switzerland) Belinda Bencic (Switzerland) Viktorija Golubic	7–5, 6–1

== WTA Tour finals ==
=== Singles: 15 (9 titles, 6 runner-ups) ===
Legend Grand Slam (2–0) WTA 1000 (1–1) WTA 500 (2–2) International / WTA 250 (4–3)	Finals by surface Hard (6–3) Clay (2–1) Grass (1–2)	Finals by setting Outdoor (7–6) Indoor (2–0)

Result	W–L	Date	Tournament	Tier	Surface	Opponent	Score
Loss	0–1	May 2017	Nuremberg Cup, Germany	International	Clay	(Netherlands) Kiki Bertens	2–6, 1–6
Loss	0–2	Mar 2021	Dubai Championships, United Arab Emirates	WTA 1000	Hard	(Spain) Garbiñe Muguruza	6–7^{(6–8)}, 3–6
Win	1–2	May 2021	Internationaux de Strasbourg, France	WTA 250	Clay	(Romania) Sorana Cîrstea	6–3, 6–3
Win	2–2	Jun 2021	French Open, France	Grand Slam	Clay	(Russia) Anastasia Pavlyuchenkova	6–1, 2–6, 6–4
Win	3–2	Jul 2021	Prague Open, Czech Republic	WTA 250	Hard	(Czech Republic) Tereza Martincová	6–2, 6–0
Loss	3–3	Jan 2022	Sydney International, Australia	WTA 500	Hard	(Spain) Paula Badosa	3–6, 6–4, 6–7^{(4–7)}
Win	4–3	Oct 2022	Tallinn Open, Estonia	WTA 250	Hard (i)	(Estonia) Anett Kontaveit	6–2, 6–3
Win	5–3	Oct 2022	Ostrava Open, Czech Republic	WTA 500	Hard (i)	(Poland) Iga Świątek	5–7, 7–6^{(7–4)}, 6–3
Win	6–3	Feb 2023	Dubai Championships, UAE	WTA 1000	Hard	(Poland) Iga Świątek	6–4, 6–2
Loss	6–4	Jun 2023	Birmingham Classic, United Kingdom	WTA 250	Grass	(Latvia) Jeļena Ostapenko	6–7^{(8–10)}, 4–6
Win	7–4	Sep 2023	Southern California Open, United States	WTA 500	Hard	(United States) Sofia Kenin	6–4, 2–6, 6–4
Loss	7–5	Oct 2023	Zhengzhou Open, China	WTA 500	Hard	(China) Zheng Qinwen	6–2, 2–6, 4–6
Win	8–5	Jul 2024	Wimbledon, United Kingdom	Grand Slam	Grass	(Italy) Jasmine Paolini	6–2, 2–6, 6–4
Loss	8–6	Jun 2026	Libéma Open, Netherlands	WTA 250	Grass	(United States) Robin Montgomery	w/o
Win	9–6	Jul 2026	Athens Open, Greece	WTA 250	Hard	(Greece) Maria Sakkari	7–6^{(7–5)}, 6–3

=== Doubles: 31 (20 titles, 11 runner-ups) ===
Legend Grand Slam (7–1) WTA Finals (1–2) Olympics (1–0) Premier 5 & Premier M / WTA 1000 (3–3) Premier / WTA 500 (3–2) International / WTA 250 (5–3)	Finals by surface Hard (13–9) Clay (4–2) Grass (3–0)	Finals by setting Outdoor (18–7) Indoor (2–4)

Result	W–L	Date	Tournament	Tier	Surface	Partner	Opponents	Score
Loss	0–1	Oct 2014	Luxembourg Open, Luxembourg	International	Hard (i)	(Czech Republic) Lucie Hradecká	(Switzerland) Timea Bacsinszky (Germany) Kristina Barrois	6–3, 4–6, [4–10]
Win	1–1	Sep 2015	Tournoi de Québec, Canada	International	Hard (i)	(Belgium) An-Sophie Mestach	(Argentina) María Irigoyen (Poland) Paula Kania	4–6, 6–3, [12–10]
Loss	1–2	Feb 2016	St. Petersburg Trophy, Russia	Premier	Hard (i)	(Russia) Vera Dushevina	(Switzerland) Martina Hingis (India) Sania Mirza	3–6, 1–6
Loss	1–3	Jul 2017	Swedish Open, Sweden	International	Clay	(Argentina) María Irigoyen	(Netherlands) Quirine Lemoine (Netherlands) Arantxa Rus	6–3, 3–6, [8–10]
Loss	1–4	Jan 2018	Shenzhen Open, China	International	Hard	(Czech Republic) Kateřina Siniaková	(Romania) Simona Halep (Romania) Irina-Camelia Begu	6–1, 1–6, [8–10]
Loss	1–5	Apr 2018	Miami Open, United States	Premier M	Hard	(Czech Republic) Kateřina Siniaková	(Australia) Ashleigh Barty (United States) CoCo Vandeweghe	2–6, 1–6
Win	2–5	Jun 2018	French Open, France	Grand Slam	Clay	(Czech Republic) Kateřina Siniaková	(Japan) Eri Hozumi (Japan) Makoto Ninomiya	6–3, 6–3
Win	3–5	Jul 2018	Wimbledon, United Kingdom	Grand Slam	Grass	(Czech Republic) Kateřina Siniaková	(United States) Nicole Melichar (Czech Republic) Květa Peschke	6–4, 4–6, 6–0
Loss	3–6	Oct 2018	WTA Finals, Singapore	Finals	Hard (i)	(Czech Republic) Kateřina Siniaková	(Hungary) Tímea Babos (France) Kristina Mladenovic	4–6, 5–7
Loss	3–7	Mar 2019	Indian Wells Open, United States	Premier M	Hard	(Czech Republic) Kateřina Siniaková	(Belgium) Elise Mertens (Belarus) Aryna Sabalenka	3–6, 2–6
Win	4–7	Aug 2019	Canadian Open, Canada	Premier 5	Hard	(Czech Republic) Kateřina Siniaková	(Germany) Anna-Lena Grönefeld (Netherlands) Demi Schuurs	7–5, 6–0
Win	5–7	Oct 2019	Linz Open, Austria	International	Hard (i)	(Czech Republic) Kateřina Siniaková	(Austria) Barbara Haas (Switzerland) Xenia Knoll	6–4, 6–3
Win	6–7	Jan 2020	Shenzhen Open, China	International	Hard	(Czech Republic) Kateřina Siniaková	(China) Zheng Saisai (China) Duan Yingying	6–2, 3–6, [10–4]
Loss	6–8	Feb 2020	Dubai Championships, UAE	Premier	Hard	(China) Zheng Saisai	(Chinese Taipei) Hsieh Su-wei (Czech Republic) Barbora Strýcová	5–7, 6–3, [5–10]
Win	7–8	Feb 2021	Gippsland Trophy, Australia	WTA 500	Hard	(Czech Republic) Kateřina Siniaková	(Chinese Taipei) Chan Hao-ching (Chinese Taipei) Latisha Chan	6–3, 7–6^{(7–4)}
Loss	7–9	Feb 2021	Australian Open, Australia	Grand Slam	Hard	(Czech Republic) Kateřina Siniaková	(Belgium) Elise Mertens (Belarus) Aryna Sabalenka	2–6, 3–6
Win	8–9	May 2021	Madrid Open, Spain	WTA 1000	Clay	(Czech Republic) Kateřina Siniaková	(Canada) Gabriela Dabrowski (Netherlands) Demi Schuurs	6–4, 6–3
Win	9–9	Jun 2021	French Open, France (2)	Grand Slam	Clay	(Czech Republic) Kateřina Siniaková	(United States) Bethanie Mattek-Sands (Poland) Iga Świątek	6–4, 6–2
Win	10–9	Aug 2021	Tokyo Olympics, Japan	Olympics	Hard	(Czech Republic) Kateřina Siniaková	(Switzerland) Belinda Bencic (Switzerland) Viktorija Golubic	7–5, 6–1
Win	11–9	Nov 2021	WTA Finals, Mexico	Finals	Hard	(Czech Republic) Kateřina Siniaková	(Chinese Taipei) Hsieh Su-wei (Belgium) Elise Mertens	6–3, 6–4
Win	12–9	Jan 2022	Australian Open, Australia	Grand Slam	Hard	(Czech Republic) Kateřina Siniaková	(Kazakhstan) Anna Danilina (Brazil) Beatriz Haddad Maia	6–7^{(3–7)}, 6–4, 6–4
Win	13–9	Jul 2022	Wimbledon, United Kingdom (2)	Grand Slam	Grass	(Czech Republic) Kateřina Siniaková	(Belgium) Elise Mertens (China) Zhang Shuai	6–2, 6–4
Win	14–9	Sep 2022	US Open, United States	Grand Slam	Hard	(Czech Republic) Kateřina Siniaková	(United States) Caty McNally (United States) Taylor Townsend	3–6, 7–5, 6–1
Loss	14–10	Nov 2022	WTA Finals, United States	Finals	Hard (i)	(Czech Republic) Kateřina Siniaková	Veronika Kudermetova (Belgium) Elise Mertens	2–6, 6–4, [9–11]
Win	15–10	Jan 2023	Australian Open, Australia (2)	Grand Slam	Hard	(Czech Republic) Kateřina Siniaková	(Japan) Shuko Aoyama (Japan) Ena Shibahara	6–4, 6–3
Win	16–10	Mar 2023	Indian Wells Open, US	WTA 1000	Hard	(Czech Republic) Kateřina Siniaková	(Brazil) Beatriz Haddad Maia (Germany) Laura Siegemund	6–1, 6–7^{(3–7)}, [10–7]
Win	17–10	Jun 2023	Birmingham Classic, UK	WTA 250	Grass	(Ukraine) Marta Kostyuk	(Australia) Storm Hunter (United States) Alycia Parks	6–2, 7–6^{(9–7)}
Win	18–10	Sep 2023	Southern California Open, US	WTA 500	Hard	(Czech Republic) Kateřina Siniaková	(United States) Danielle Collins (United States) CoCo Vandeweghe	6–1, 6–4
Loss	18–11	May 2024	Madrid Open, Spain	WTA 1000	Clay	(Germany) Laura Siegemund	(Spain) Cristina Bucșa (Spain) Sara Sorribes Tormo	0–6, 2–6
Win	19–11	Jul 2024	Prague Open, Czech Republic	WTA 250	Clay	(Czech Republic) Kateřina Siniaková	(United States) Bethanie Mattek-Sands (Czech Republic) Lucie Šafářová	6–3, 6–3
Win	20–11	Sep 2025	Korea Open, South Korea	WTA 500	Hard	(Czech Republic) Kateřina Siniaková	(United States) Caty McNally (Australia) Maya Joint	6–3, 7–6^{(8–6)}

== WTA 125 finals ==
=== Singles: 1 (runner-up) ===
Result	Date	Tournament	Surface	Opponent	Score
Loss	May 2026	Parma Ladies Open, Italy	Clay	(Ukraine) Dayana Yastremska	3–6, 3–6

=== Doubles: 1 (title) ===
Result	Date	Tournament	Surface	Partner	Opponents	Score
Win	Nov 2015	Open de Limoges, France	Hard (i)	(Luxembourg) Mandy Minella	(Russia) Margarita Gasparyan (Georgia (country)) Oksana Kalashnikova	1–6, 7–5, [10–6]

== ITF Circuit finals ==
=== Singles: 21 (14 titles, 7 runner-ups) ===
Legend W80 tournaments (1–0) 50k / W60 tournaments (3–0) 25k / W25 tournaments (4–4) 10k / 15k tournaments (6–3)	Finals by surface Hard (1–1) Clay (13–6)

Result	W–L	Date	Tournament	Tier	Surface	Opponent	Score
Loss	0–1	Sep 2011	ITF Osijek, Croatia	10k	Clay	(Croatia) Petra Šunić	6–4, 0–6, 2–6
Win	1–1	Oct 2012	ITF Dubrovnik, Croatia	10k	Clay	(Russia) Polina Leykina	6–4, 6–1
Loss	1–2	Apr 2013	ITF Šibenik, Croatia	10k	Clay	(Hungary) Ágnes Bukta	3–6, 2–6
Win	2–2	Oct 2013	ITF Solin, Croatia	10k	Clay	(Czech Republic) Tereza Malíková	6–2, 6–2
Win	3–2	Oct 2013	ITF Dubrovnik, Croatia	10k	Clay	(Slovenia) Polona Reberšak	6–1, 3–6, 6–0
Win	4–2	Nov 2013	ITF Umag, Croatia	10k	Clay	(Hungary) Ágnes Bukta	6–1, 6–4
Win	5–2	Dec 2013	ITF Bol, Croatia	10k	Clay	(Croatia) Ema Mikulčić	3–6, 6–0, 6–3
Loss	5–3	Mar 2014	ITF Antalya, Turkey	10k	Hard	(Czech Republic) Denisa Allertová	3–6, 2–6
Win	6–3	Jun 2014	ITF Přerov, Czech Republic	15k	Clay	(Slovakia) Lenka Juríková	6–3, 6–4
Win	7–3	Jul 2014	Bella Cup Toruń, Poland	25k	Clay	(Greece) Maria Sakkari	6–4, 6–1
Win	8–3	Oct 2014	ITF Istanbul, Turkey	25k	Hard (i)	(Switzerland) Viktorija Golubic	6–1, 6–4
Loss	8–4	Feb 2015	ITF Beinasco, Italy	25k	Clay (i)	(Slovakia) Kristína Kučová	4–6, 6–7^{(3–7)}
Win	9–4	Jul 2015	ITS Cup Olomouc, Czech Republic	50k	Clay	(Czech Republic) Petra Cetkovská	3–6, 6–4, 7–6^{(7–5)}
Loss	9–5	Aug 2015	ITF Plzeň, Czech Republic	25k	Clay	(Czech Republic) Andrea Hlaváčková	6–3, 2–6, 3–6
Loss	9–6	Mar 2017	ITF Mornington, Australia	25k	Clay	(Australia) Destanee Aiava	2–6, 6–4, 2–6
Loss	9–7	Apr 2017	ITF Mornington, Australia	25k	Clay	(France) Shérazad Reix	6–7^{(3–7)}, 4–6
Win	10–7	Jul 2018	Bella Cup Toruń, Poland	25k	Clay	(Slovakia) Rebecca Šramková	7–5, 6–1
Win	11–7	Apr 2019	Innisbrook Open, United States	W80	Clay	(United States) Nicole Gibbs	6–0, 6–1
Win	12–7	Apr 2019	ITF Pelham, United States	W25	Clay	(United States) Caroline Dolehide	6–4, 6–3
Win	13–7	May 2019	Wiesbaden Open, Germany	W60	Clay	(Ukraine) Katarina Zavatska	6–4, 7–6^{(7–2)}
Win	14–7	Jun 2019	Macha Lake Open, Czech Republic	W60	Clay	(Czech Republic) Denisa Allertová	6–2, 6–3

=== Doubles: 26 (19 titles, 7 runner-ups) ===
Legend 50k tournaments (3–2) 25k tournaments (5–1) 10k / 15k tournaments (11–4)	Finals by surface Hard (1–2) Clay (18–5)

Result	W–L	Date	Tournament	Tier	Surface	Partner	Opponents	Score
Win	1–0	Sep 2011	ITF Osijek, Croatia	10k	Clay	(Czech Republic) Aneta Dvořáková	(Ukraine) Diana Bogoliy (Russia) Alena Tarasova	7–5, 6–2
Win	2–0	Oct 2011	ITF Dubrovnik, Croatia	10k	Clay	(Russia) Victoria Kan	(Czech Republic) Martina Kubičíková (Bulgaria) Dalia Zafirova	7–6^{(7–3)}, 6–0
Win	3–0	Aug 2012	ITF Osijek, Croatia	10k	Clay	(Czech Republic) Aneta Dvořáková	(Czech Republic) Kateřina Kramperová (Czech Republic) Petra Krejsová	6–4, 3–6, [10–8]
Win	4–0	Oct 2012	ITF Sarajevo, BiH	15k	Clay	(Czech Republic) Tereza Malíková	(Italy) Angelica Moratelli (Serbia) Milana Špremo	6–3, 6–2
Loss	4–1	Oct 2012	ITF Dubrovnik, Croatia	10k	Clay	(Czech Republic) Martina Kubičíková	(Italy) Giulia Bruzzone (Italy) Chiara Mendo	4–6, 2–6
Win	5–1	Oct 2012	ITF Dubrovnik, Croatia	10k	Clay	(Czech Republic) Tereza Malíková	(Slovakia) Lucia Butkovská (Germany) Christina Shakovets	7–5, 7–6^{(7–5)}
Win	6–1	Apr 2013	ITF Bol, Croatia	10k	Clay	(Russia) Polina Leykina	(Croatia) Jana Fett (United States) Bernarda Pera	6–3, 6–3
Win	7–1	Apr 2013	ITF Šibenik, Croatia	10k	Clay	(Russia) Polina Leykina	(Netherlands) Cindy Burger (Germany) Anna Klasen	3–6, 6–3, [12–10]
Loss	7–2	Aug 2013	ITF Bad Saulgau, Germany	25k	Clay	(Czech Republic) Kateřina Siniaková	(Romania) Laura-Ioana Andrei (Romania) Elena Bogdan	7–6^{(13–11)}, 4–6, [8–10]
Win	8–2	Aug 2013	Ladies Open Hechingen, Germany	25k	Clay	(Czech Republic) Kateřina Siniaková	(Romania) Laura-Ioana Andrei (France) Laura Thorpe	6–1, 6–4
Win	9–2	Oct 2013	ITF Dubrovnik, Croatia	10k	Clay	(Slovakia) Lenka Juríková	(Czech Republic) Gabriela Pantůčková (Slovenia) Polona Reberšak	7–5, 3–6, [10–4]
Loss	9–3	Oct 2013	ITF Dubrovnik, Croatia	10k	Clay	(Slovakia) Lenka Juríková	(Hungary) Ágnes Bukta (Slovakia) Vivien Juhászová	3–6, 3–6
Loss	9–4	Nov 2013	ITF Umag, Croatia	10k	Clay	(Hungary) Ágnes Bukta	(Slovakia) Vivien Juhászová (Czech Republic) Tereza Malíková	4–6, 6–7^{(5–7)}
Win	10–4	Nov 2013	ITF Bol, Croatia	10k	Clay	(Netherlands) Demi Schuurs	(Slovakia) Vivien Juhászová (Czech Republic) Tereza Malíková	6–2, 6–4
Win	11–4	Nov 2013	ITF Bol, Croatia	10k	Clay	(Romania) Ana Bianca Mihăilă	(Serbia) Bojana Marinković (Slovenia) Natalija Šipek	6–2, 6–2
Loss	11–5	Mar 2014	ITF Antalya, Turkey	10k	Hard	(Turkey) İpek Soylu	(Sweden) Susanne Celik (Japan) Kotomi Takahata	4–6, 3–6
Win	12–5	Mar 2014	ITF Maribor, Slovenia	25k	Clay	(Czech Republic) Kateřina Siniaková	(Netherlands) Cindy Burger (Chile) Daniela Seguel	6–0, 6–1
Win	13–5	Jun 2014	ITF Sarajevo, BiH	15k	Clay	(Bulgaria) Viktoriya Tomova	(Germany) Carolin Daniels (Turkey) Melis Sezer	7–6^{(7–3)}, 6–2
Loss	13–6	Jul 2014	ITS Cup Olomouc, Czech Republic	50k	Clay	(Serbia) Aleksandra Krunić	(Czech Republic) Petra Cetkovská (Czech Republic) Renata Voráčová	2–6, 6–4, [7–10]
Win	14–6	Jul 2014	Sobota Open, Poland	50k	Clay	(Serbia) Aleksandra Krunić	(Ukraine) Anastasiya Vasylyeva (Ukraine) Maryna Zanevska	3–6, 6–0, [10–6]
Win	15–6	Jun 2015	ITF Padua, Italy	25k	Clay	(Argentina) María Irigoyen	(Hungary) Réka Luca Jani (Argentina) Paula Ormaechea	6–4, 6–2
Win	16–6	Jun 2015	Open de Montpellier, France	50k	Clay	(Argentina) María Irigoyen	(Germany) Laura Siegemund (Czech Republic) Renata Voráčová	6–4, 6–2
Win	17–6	Aug 2015	ITF lzeň, Czech Republic	25k	Clay	(Sweden) Rebecca Peterson	(Czech Republic) Lenka Kunčíková (Czech Republic) Karolína Stuchlá	6–4, 6–3
Loss	17–7	Oct 2015	Abierto Victoria, Mexico	50k	Hard	(Argentina) María Irigoyen	(Belgium) Ysaline Bonaventure (Belgium) Elise Mertens	4–6, 6–4, [6–10]
Win	18–7	Oct 2015	Abierto Tampico, Mexico	50k	Hard	(Argentina) María Irigoyen	(Paraguay) Verónica Cepede Royg (Russia) Marina Melnikova	7–5, 6–2
Win	19–7	Mar 2017	ITF Mornington, Australia	25k	Clay	(Israel) Julia Glushko	(Australia) Jessica Moore (Thailand) Varatchaya Wongteanchai	6–4, 2–6, [11–9]

== ITF Junior Circuit ==
=== Junior Grand Slam finals ===
==== Doubles: 4 (3 titles, 1 runner–up) ====
Result	Year	Tournament	Surface	Partner	Opponents	Score
Loss	2013	Australian Open	Hard	(Ukraine) Oleksandra Korashvili	(Croatia) Ana Konjuh (Canada) Carol Zhao	7–5, 4–6, [7–10]
Win	2013	French Open	Clay	(Czech Republic) Kateřina Siniaková	(Ecuador) Doménica González (Brazil) Beatriz Haddad Maia	7–5, 6–2
Win	2013	Wimbledon	Grass	(Czech Republic) Kateřina Siniaková	(Ukraine) Anhelina Kalinina (Belarus) Iryna Shymanovich	6–3, 6–1
Win	2013	US Open	Hard	(Czech Republic) Kateřina Siniaková	(Switzerland) Belinda Bencic (Spain) Sara Sorribes Tormo	6–3, 6–4

=== ITF Junior Circuit finals ===
==== Singles: 11 (7 titles, 4 runner-ups) ====
Legend
Grade 1/B1 (3–1)
Grade 2 (2–1)
Grade 4 (1–1)
Grade 5 (1–1)

Result	W–L	Date	Tournament	Tier	Surface	Opponent	Score
Win	1–0	Aug 2009	ITF Mostar, BiH	Grade 5	Clay	(Slovakia) Karolina Pondusová	6–1, 6–3
Loss	1–1	Sep 2009	ITF Luzern, Switzerland	Grade 5	Clay	(Switzerland) Samira Giger	6–1, 2–6, 4–6
Win	2–1	Jun 2010	ITF Maribor, Slovenia	Grade 4	Clay	(Russia) Ksenia Gospodinova	6–4, 6–4
Loss	2–2	Aug 2010	ITF Žilina, Slovakia	Grade 4	Clay	(Slovakia) Petra Uberalová	4–6, 1–6
Loss	2–3	Sep 2011	ITF Prague, Czech Republic	Grade 2	Clay	(Czech Republic) Tereza Smitková	3–6, 2–6
Win	3–3	Sep 2012	ITF Prague, Czech Republic	Grade 2	Clay	(Russia) Anastasiya Komardina	2–6, 6–2, 6–2
Win	4–3	Sep 2012	ITF Novi Sad, Serbia	Grade 2	Clay	(Czech Republic) Gabriela Pantůčková	6–2, 6–2
Not played	4–4	Mar 2013	ITF Umag, Croatia	Grade 1	Clay	(Russia) Victoria Kan	cancelled
Win	5–4	Jun 2013	ITF Offenbach, Germany	Grade 1	Clay	(Belarus) Iryna Shymanovich	6–1, 6–2
Win	6–4	Jul 2013	ITF Klosters, Switzerland	Grade B1	Clay	(Switzerland) Karin Kennel	6–2, 6–4
Win	7–4	Aug 2013	ITF Repentigny, Canada	Grade 1	Hard	(Czech Republic) Kateřina Siniaková	6–2, 0–6, 6–3

==== Doubles: 26 (16 titles, 10 runner-ups) ====
Legend
Grade A (3–2)
Grade 1/B1 (6–4)
Grade 2 (2–3)
Grade 3 (1–0)
Grade 4 (2–1)
Grade 5 (2–0)

Result	W–L	Date	Tournament	Tier	Surface	Partner	Opponents	Score
Win	1–0	Aug 2009	ITF Mostar, BiH	Grade 5	Clay	(Slovakia) Alexandra Petrzalková	(Turkey) Ekin Gunaysu (Slovakia) Karolina Pondusová	6–2, 6–3
Win	2–0	Sep 2009	ITF Luzern, Switzerland	Grade 5	Clay	(Czech Republic) Gabriela Pantůčková	(Czech Republic) Andrea Martinovská (Czech Republic) Natalie Novaková	7–5, 6–0
Win	3–0	Jan 2010	ITF Szczecin, Poland	Grade 4	Hard	(Czech Republic) Aneta Dvoraková	(Russia) Alisa Kniazeva (Russia) Anastasiya Saitova	6–0, 6–4
Win	4–0	Jul 2010	ITF Plzeň, Czech Republic	Grade 3	Clay	(Czech Republic) Aneta Dvoraková	(Poland) Marcelina Cichon (Norway) Caroline Rohde-Moe	6–2, 6–1
Win	5–0	Aug 2010	ITF Žilina, Slovakia	Grade 4	Clay	(Slovakia) Veronika Zateková	(Belgium) Marie Benoît (Belgium) Deborah Kerfs	6–1, 6–2
Loss	5–1	Sep 2010	ITF Novi Sad, Serbia	Grade 2	Clay	(Belarus) Aliaksandra Sasnovich	(Belarus) Viktoryia Kisialeva (Belarus) Darya Lebesheva	4–6, 7–5, [5–10]
Loss	5–2	Oct 2010	ITF Veli Lošinj, Croatia	Grade 4	Clay	(Czech Republic) Veronika Zavodská	(Romania) Irina Bara (Croatia) Bernarda Pera	7–6^{(7–3)}, 5–7, [7–10]
Loss	5–3	Jan 2011	ITF Přerov, Czech Republic	Grade 1	Carpet	(Czech Republic) Aneta Dvoraková	(Austria) Barbara Haas (Austria) Patricia Haas	6–4, 4–6, [7–10]
Loss	5–4	Mar 2011	Copa Gerdau, Brazil	Grade A	Clay	(Czech Republic) Aneta Dvoraková	(Ecuador) Doménica González (Paraguay) Montserrat González	5–7, 3–6
Loss	5–5	Apr 2011	ITF Piešťany, Slovakia	Grade 2	Clay	(Czech Republic) Aneta Dvoraková	(Ukraine) Yuliya Lysa (Czech Republic) Tereza Smitková	6–2, 3–6, [4–10]
Win	6–5	May 2011	ITF Santa Croce, Italy	Grade 1	Clay	(Russia) Irina Khromacheva	(Netherlands) Indy de Vroome (Belgium) Deborah Kerfs	6–2, 6–1
Win	7–5	Jun 2011	ITF Halle, Germany	Grade 2	Grass	(Czech Republic) Aneta Dvoraková	(Germany) Katharina Lehnert (Germany) Stephanie Wagner	6–4, 6–1
Loss	7–6	Sep 2011	ITF Prague, Czech Republic	Grade 2	Clay	(Czech Republic) Aneta Dvoraková	(Latvia) Jeļena Ostapenko (Czech Republic) Kateřina Siniaková	6–2, 4–6, [6–10]
Win	8–6	Mar 2012	ITF Sarawak, Malaysia	Grade 1	Hard	(Australia) Abbie Myers	(Japan) Kanami Nishimura (Russia) Anna Tyulpa	w/o
Loss	8–7	Mar 2012	ITF Manila, Philippines	Grade 1	Hard	(Australia) Abbie Myers	(Japan) Mami Adachi (Japan) Hikari Yamamoto	3–6, 6–2, [4–10]
Win	9–7	Jun 2012	ITF Halle, Germany (2)	Grade 2	Grass	(Czech Republic) Dominika Paterová	(United States) Blair Shankle (Colombia) Laura Ucrós	6–3, 3–6, [10–6]
walkover	9–8	Jul 2012	ITF Linz, Austria	Grade 1	Clay	(Slovakia) Petra Uberalová	(United States) Christina Makarova (Belgium) Elise Mertens	w/o
Loss	9–9	Jan 2013	Australian Open, Australia	Grade A	Hard	(Ukraine) Oleksandra Korashvili	(Croatia) Ana Konjuh (Canada) Carol Zhao	7–5, 4–6, [7–10]
Loss	9–10	Mar 2013	ITF Umag, Croatia	Grade 1	Clay	(Romania) Ioana Ducu	(Italy) Deborah Chiesa (Spain) Sara Sorribes Tormo	5–7, 3–6
Win	10–10	May 2013	ITF Santa Croce, Italy (2)	Grade 1	Clay	(Romania) Ilka Csoregi	(Croatia) Jana Fett (Ukraine) Helen Ploskina	6–1, 6–1
Win	11–10	Jun 2013	French Open, France	Grade A	Clay	(Czech Republic) Kateřina Siniaková	(Ecuador) Doménica González (Brazil) Beatriz Haddad Maia	7–5, 6–2
Win	12–10	Jun 2013	ITF Roehampton, United Kingdom	Grade 1	Grass	(Canada) Carol Zhao	(Switzerland) Belinda Bencic (Slovakia) Petra Uberalova	1–6, 6–4, [13–11]
Win	13–10	Jul 2013	Wimbledon, United Kingdom	Grade A	Grass	(Czech Republic) Kateřina Siniaková	(Ukraine) Anhelina Kalinina (Belarus) Iryna Shymanovich	6–3, 6–1
Win	14–10	Jul 2013	ITF Klosters, Switzerland	Grade B1	Clay	(Czech Republic) Kateřina Siniaková	(Romania) Ioana Ducu (Romania) Ioana Loredana Roșca	6–4, 6–1
Win	15–10	Aug 2013	ITF Repentigny, Canada	Grade 1	Hard	(Czech Republic) Kateřina Siniaková	(United Kingdom) Katie Swan (Serbia) Nina Stojanović	6–2, 6–1
Win	16–10	Sep 2013	US Open, United States	Grade A	Hard	(Czech Republic) Kateřina Siniaková	(Switzerland) Belinda Bencic (Spain) Sara Sorribes Tormo	6–3, 6–4

== Billie Jean King Cup ==
=== Finals ===
Result	W–L	Date	Tournament	Surface	Against	Partners	Opponents	Score
Win (Note: Krejčíková was planned for playing doubles match alongside Kateřina Siniaková. Since it was obvious that Czech Republic won after leading 3–0, match was cancelled.)	1–0	Nov 2018	Fed Cup, Czech Republic	Hard (i)	United States	Barbora Strýcová; Kateřina Siniaková; Karolína Plíšková (Note: Participate in the previous rounds of the edition but not in the final.); Lucie Šafářová; Petra Kvitová	Sofia Kenin; Alison Riske; Danielle Collins; Nicole Melichar	3–0

=== Participations ===
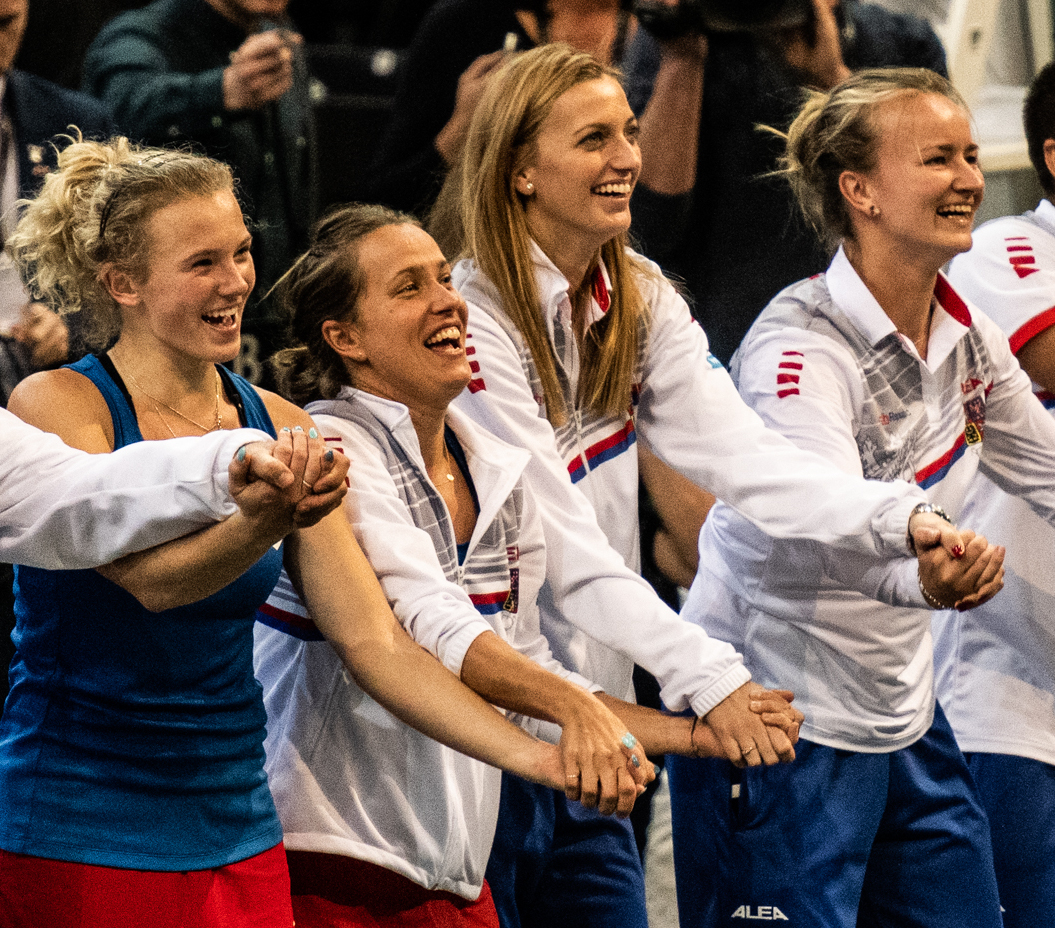
Krejčíková (last on the right) alongside her Czech team members in 2018 on her Billie Jean King Cup debut.

Legend
WG F (Team won) (0–0)
WG QF (0–1)
F RR (0–2)
WG PO / F QR (2–1)

==== Singles: 4 (1–3) ====
Edition	Round	Date	Location	Against	Surface	Opponent	W/L	Score
2021	F RR	Nov 2021	Prague (CZE)	Germany	Hard (i)	Angelique Kerber	L	7–6, 0–6, 4–6
2021	F RR	Nov 2021	Prague (CZE)	Switzerland	Hard (i)	Belinda Bencic	L	6–7, 4–6
2023	F QR	Apr 2023	Antalya (TUR)	Ukraine	Clay	Katarina Zavatska	W	6–4, 6–3
2023	F QR	Apr 2023	Antalya (TUR)	Ukraine	Clay	Marta Kostyuk	L	6–3, 1–6, 4–6

==== Doubles: 2 (1–1) ====
Edition	Round	Date	Location	Against	Surface	Partner	Opponents	W/L	Score
2018	WG F	Nov 2018	Prague (CZE)	United States	Hard (i)	Kateřina Siniaková	Danielle Collins; Nicole Melichar	–	not played (Note: In the final match against United States, Krejčíková was planned for playing in doubles but since it was obvious that Czech Republic won after they led 3–0, match was cancelled.)
2019	WG QF	Feb 2019	Ostrava (CZE)	Romania	Hard (i)	Kateřina Siniaková	Irina-Camelia Begu; Monica Niculescu	L	7–6, 4–6, 4–6
2019	WG PO	Apr 2019	Prostějov (CZE)	Canada	Clay (i)	Kateřina Siniaková	Gabriela Dabrowski; Sharon Fichman	W	7–6, 7–5

== WTA ranking ==
Current after the 2022 season.

Year	2011	2012	2013	2014	2015	2016	2017	2018	2019	2020	2021	2022	2023	Career
Singles
Highest ranking	868	605	328	168	140	179	121	125	115	65	3	2		2
Lowest ranking	1012	872	651	340	190	267	257	235	225	131	66	27		1012
Year-end ranking	895	608	376	187	187	251	126	203	135	65	5	21		5
Doubles
Highest ranking	827	614	317	117	71	26	32	1	1	7	1	2		1
Lowest ranking	1096	848	619	343	122	74	62	54	14	14	7	8		1096
Year-end ranking	827	614	352	121	87	26	54	1	13	7	2	3		1

== WTA Tour career earnings ==
Current after the 2023 Canadian Open.

Year	Grand Slam titles	WTA titles	Total titles	Earnings ($)	Money list rank
2014	–	–	–	43,148	242
2015	–	1	1	79,108	200
2016	–	–	–	199,202	134
2017	–	–	–	181,639	154
2018	2	–	2	1,183,541	33
2019	1	2	3	654,774	60
2020	1	1	2	591,712	28
2021	3	6	9	3,646,883	2
2022	3	2	5	2,136,942	11
2023	1	5	6	1,706,684	11
Career	11	17	28	10,460,758	60

- Title counts include singles, doubles and mixed doubles titles.

== Career Grand Slam statistics ==
=== Best Grand Slam results details ===
Grand Slam winners are in boldface, and runner–ups are in italics.

==== Singles ====
**Australian Open**
**2022 Australian Open (4th)**
Round	Opponent	Rank	Score
1R	(Germany) Andrea Petkovic	73	6–2, 6–0
2R	(China) Wang Xiyu (WC)	139	6–2, 6–3
3R	(Latvia) Jeļena Ostapenko (26)	27	2–6, 6–4, 6–4
4R	(Belarus) Victoria Azarenka (24)	25	6–2, 6–2
QF	(United States) Madison Keys	51	3–6, 2–6
**2024 Australian Open (9th)**
Round	Opponent	Rank	Score
1R	(Japan) Mai Hontama (WC)	121	2–6, 6–4, 6–3
2R	(Germany) Tamara Korpatsch	80	6–2, 6–2
3R	(Australia) Storm Hunter (Q)	180	4–6, 7–5, 6–3
4R	Mirra Andreeva	47	4–6, 6–3, 6–2
QF	**Aryna Sabalenka (2)**	2	2–6, 3–6

**Wimbledon Championships**
**2024 Wimbledon Championships (31st)**
Round	Opponent	Rank	Score
1R	Veronika Kudermetova	38	7–6^{(7–4)}, 6–7^{(1–7)}, 7–5
2R	(United States) Katie Volynets (Q)	69	7–6^{(8–6)}, 7–6^{(7–5)}
3R	(Spain) Jéssica Bouzas Maneiro	83	6–0, 4–3, ret.
4R	(United States) Danielle Collins (11)	11	7–5, 6–3
QF	(Latvia) Jeļena Ostapenko (13)	14	6–4, 7–6^{(7–4)}
SF	(Kazakhstan) Elena Rybakina (4)	4	3–6, 6–3, 6–4
**W**	(Italy) Jasmine Paolini (7)	7	6–2, 2–6, 6–4

**French Open**
**2021 French Open (unseeded)**
Round	Opponent	Rank	Score
1R	(Czech Republic) Kristýna Plíšková	89	5–7, 6–4, 6–2
2R	(Russia) Ekaterina Alexandrova (32)	34	6–2, 6–3
3R	(Ukraine) Elina Svitolina (5)	6	6–3, 6–2
4R	(United States) Sloane Stephens	59	6–2, 6–0
QF	(United States) Coco Gauff (24)	25	7–6^{(8–6)}, 6–3
SF	(Greece) Maria Sakkari (17)	18	7–5, 4–6, 9–7
**W**	(Russia) Anastasia Pavlyuchenkova (31)	32	6–1, 2–6, 6–4

**US Open**
**2021 US Open (8th)**
Round	Opponent	Rank	Score
1R	(Australia) Astra Sharma (Q)	114	6–0, 6–4
2R	(United States) Christina McHale	119	6–3, 6–1
3R	(Russia) Kamilla Rakhimova (LL)	134	6–4, 6–2
4R	(Spain) Garbiñe Muguruza (9)	10	6–3, 7–6^{(7–4)}
QF	(Belarus) Aryna Sabalenka (2)	2	1–6, 4–6
**2025 US Open (unseeded)**
Round	Opponent	Rank	Score
1R	(Canada) Victoria Mboko (22)	23	6–3, 6–2
2R	(Japan) Moyuka Uchijima	94	6–4, 6–2
3R	(United States) Emma Navarro (10)	11	4–6, 6–4, 6–4
4R	(United States) Taylor Townsend	139	1–6, 7–6^{(15–13)}, 6–3
QF	(United States) Jessica Pegula (4)	4	3–6, 3–6

=== Grand Slam tournament seedings ===
The tournaments won by Krejčíková are in boldface, and advanced into finals by Krejčíková are in italics.

==== Singles ====
Legend (slams won / times seeded) seeded No. 2 (0 / 1) seeded No. 4–10 (0 / 5) seeded No. 11–32 (**1** / 10) unseeded (**1** / 3) qualifier (0 / 2)	Longest streak 1 2 4 3 (Note: Due to change in schedule caused by COVID-19, in 2020, French Open was postponed and played after the 2020 US Open) 1

Year	Australian Open	French Open	Wimbledon	US Open
2014	A	A	A	DNQ
2015	DNQ	DNQ	DNQ	DNQ
2016	DNQ	A	DNQ	A
2017	DNQ	A	DNQ	DNQ
2018	DNQ	Q	A	DNQ
2019	DNQ	DNQ	A	DNQ
2020	Q	–	cancelled	A
2021	–	– **(1)**	14th	8th
2022	4th	2nd	13th	23rd
2023	20th	13th	10th	12th
2024	9th	24th	**31st (2)**	8th
2025	A	15th	17th	–
2026	–	–	–	27th

==== Doubles ====
Legend (slams won / times seeded) seeded No. 1 (**2** / 10) (Note: Krejčíková and Siniaková were seeded first but withdrew right before the tournament. This occurs twice, at the 2022 French Open and 2023 Wimbledon Championships.) seeded No. 2 (**2** / 4) seeded No. 3 (**2** / 3) seeded No. 4–10 (**1** / 6) seeded No. 11–32 (0 / 3) unseeded (0 / 6) Protected ranking (0 / 1)	Longest streak 4 1 1 3 1 3 1

Year	Australian Open	French Open	Wimbledon	US Open
2015	A	–	A	absent
2016	–	–	–	16th
2017	PR	12th	–	–
2018	16th	**6th (1)**	**3rd (2)**	1st
2019	1st	1st	2nd	A
2020	4th	4th	cancelled	A
2021	3rd (1)	**2nd (3)**	1st	2nd
2022	**1st (4)**	~~1st~~	**2nd (5)**	**3rd (6)**
2023	**1st (7)**	1st	~~1st~~	1st
2024	5th	4th	8th	A

==== Mixed doubles ====
Legend (slams won / times seeded) seeded No. 1 (0 / 1) seeded No. 3 (**1** / 1) seeded No. 4–10 (2 / 3) seeded No. 11–32 (0 / 1) unseeded (0 / 3)	Longest streak 1 1 1 1 2

Year	Australian Open	French Open	Wimbledon	US Open
2016	A	A	–	–
2017	8th	–	15th	A
2018	A	A	A	A
2019	**3rd (1)**	A	A	A
2020	**5th (2)**	cancelled	cancelled	cancelled
2021	**6th (3)**	1st	A	A
2022	A	A	A	A
2023	A	A	A	A

- Key: (A) absent; (Q) qualifier; (DNQ) did not qualify; (RT) retired; (NH) Not Held; (–) unseeded; (LL) lucky looser; (PR) protect ranking.

== Wins against top 10 players ==
- Krejčíková has an 16–25 (39%) singles record against players who were, at the time the match was played, ranked in the top 10.

No.	Player	Rk	Event	Surface	Rd	Score	Rk	Years	Ref
1	(United States) Sofia Kenin	5	Italian Open, Italy	Clay	2R	6–1, 6–4	40	2021	
2	(Ukraine) Elina Svitolina	6	French Open, France	Clay	3R	6–3, 6–2	33	2021	
3	(Spain) Garbiñe Muguruza	9	Canadian Open, Canada	Hard	3R	6–2, 0–6, 6–3	10	2021	
4	(Spain) Garbiñe Muguruza	10	US Open, United States	Hard	4R	6–3, 7–6^{(7–4)}	9	2021	
5	(Estonia) Anett Kontaveit	7	Sydney International, Australia	Hard	SF	0–6, 6–4, 7–6^{(14–12)}	4	2022	
6	(Estonia) Anett Kontaveit	4	Tallinn Open, Estonia	Hard (i)	F	6–2, 6–3	27	2022	
7	(Poland) Iga Świątek	1	Ostrava Open, Czech Republic	Hard (i)	F	5–7, 7–6^{(7–4)}, 6–3	23	2022	
8	Daria Kasatkina	8	Dubai Championships, UAE	Hard	2R	6–4, 4–6, 7–5	30	2023	
9	Aryna Sabalenka	2	Dubai Championships, UAE	Hard	QF	0–6, 7–6^{(7–2)}, 6–1	30	2023	
10	(United States) Jessica Pegula	3	Dubai Championships, UAE	Hard	SF	6–1, 5–7, 6–0	30	2023	
11	(Poland) Iga Świątek	1	Dubai Championships, UAE	Hard	F	6–4, 6–2	30	2023	
12	(Kazakhstan) Elena Rybakina	4	Wimbledon, United Kingdom	Grass	SF	3–6, 6–3, 6–4	32	2024	
13	(Italy) Jasmine Paolini	7	Wimbledon, United Kingdom	Grass	F	6–2, 2–6, 6–4	32	2024	
14	(United States) Jessica Pegula	6	WTA Finals, Saudi Arabia	Hard (i)	RR	6–3, 6–3	13	2024	
15	(United States) Coco Gauff	3	WTA Finals, Saudi Arabia	Hard (i)	RR	7–5, 6–4	13	2024	
16	Mirra Andreeva	5	Wimbledon, United Kingdom	Grass	2R	4–6, 7–5, 6–4	38	2026	

- Key: (Rk) first use, opponent rank; (Rd) round; (Rk) 2nd use, player rank; (Ref) reference; (F) final; (SF) semifinal; (QF) quarterfinal; (#R) rounds 4, 3, 2, 1; (RR) round-robin stage; (Q#) qualifying rounds or stages (3), 2, 1.

== Longest winning streaks ==
=== 15-match singles winning streak (2021) ===
#	Tournament	Tier	Start date	Surface	Rd	Opponent	Rank	Score
–	Italian Open	WTA 1000	9 May 2021	Clay	3R	(Poland) Iga Świątek	15	6–3, 6–7^{(5–7)}, 5–7
1	Internationaux de Strasbourg	WTA 250	23 May 2021	Clay	1R	(France) Océane Dodin	115	6–3, 3–0, ret.
2	Internationaux de Strasbourg	WTA 250	23 May 2021	Clay	2R	(France) Caroline Garcia	57	3–6, 6–2, 6–1
3	Internationaux de Strasbourg	WTA 250	23 May 2021	Clay	QF	(Russia) Ekaterina Alexandrova (3)	33	7–6^{(7–4)}, 6–1
4	Internationaux de Strasbourg	WTA 250	23 May 2021	Clay	SF	(Germany) Jule Niemeier (Q)	216	5–7, 6–3, 6–4
5	Internationaux de Strasbourg	WTA 250	23 May 2021	Clay	F	(Romania) Sorana Cîrstea	61	6–3, 6–3
6	French Open	Grand Slam	30 May 2021	Clay	1R	(Czech Republic) Kristýna Plíšková	89	5–7, 6–4, 6–2
7	French Open	Grand Slam	30 May 2021	Clay	2R	(Russia) Ekaterina Alexandrova (32)	34	6–2, 6–3
8	French Open	Grand Slam	30 May 2021	Clay	3R	(Ukraine) Elina Svitolina (5)	6	6–3, 6–2
9	French Open	Grand Slam	30 May 2021	Clay	4R	(United States) Sloane Stephens	59	6–2, 6–0
10	French Open	Grand Slam	30 May 2021	Clay	QF	(United States) Coco Gauff (24)	25	7–6^{(8–6)}, 6–3
11	French Open	Grand Slam	30 May 2021	Clay	SF	(Greece) Maria Sakkari (17)	18	7–5, 4–6, 9–7
12	French Open	Grand Slam	30 May 2021	Clay	F	(Russia) Anastasia Pavlyuchenkova (31)	27	6–1, 2–6, 6–4
13	Wimbledon	Grand Slam	28 June 2021	Grass	1R	(Denmark) Clara Tauson	93	6–3, 6–2
14	Wimbledon	Grand Slam	28 June 2021	Grass	2R	(Germany) Andrea Petkovic (PR)	130	7–5, 6–4
15	Wimbledon	Grand Slam	28 June 2021	Grass	3R	(Latvia) Anastasija Sevastova	56	7–6^{(7–1)}, 3–6, 7–5
–	Wimbledon	Grand Slam	28 June 2021	Grass	4R	(Australia) Ashleigh Barty	1	5–7, 3–6

== Awards ==
=== WTA Awards ===
- Doubles Team of the year: 2018, 2021 and 2022 (alongside Kateřina Siniaková)
- Most improved player of the year: 2021

== See also ==
- Krejčíková–Siniaková doubles team
