= 2015 Abierto Victoria =

- Date: 28 September–4 October
- Edition: 4th
- Category: ITF Women's Circuit
- Prize money: $50,000
- Surface: Hard
- Location: Ciudad Victoria, Mexico

Champions

Singles
- (Belgium) Elise Mertens

Doubles
- (Belgium) Ysaline Bonaventure / (Belgium) Elise Mertens
← 2014 ·	Abierto Victoria	· 2016 →

The 2015 Abierto Victoria was a professional tennis tournament played on outdoor hard courts. It was the fourth edition of the tournament and part of the 2015 ITF Women's Circuit, offering a total of $50,000 in prize money. It took place in Ciudad Victoria, Mexico, on 28 September–4 October 2015.

== Singles main draw entrants ==
=== Seeds ===
Country	Player	Rank^{1}	Seed
ESP	Lourdes Domínguez Lino	99	1
ESP	Sílvia Soler Espinosa	135	2
FRA	Pauline Parmentier	140	3
CZE	Barbora Krejčíková	163	4
BEL	Ysaline Bonaventure	168	5
CRO	Tereza Mrdeža	171	6
TUR	İpek Soylu	173	7
FRA	Alizé Lim	175	8

- ^{1} Rankings as of 21 September 2015

=== Other entrants ===
The following players received wildcards into the singles main draw:

- (Mexico) Constanza Gorches
- (Mexico) Ximena Hermoso
- (Mexico) Sarai Delfina Monarrez Yesaki
- (Mexico) Ana Sofía Sánchez

The following players received entry from the qualifying draw:

- (Italy) Georgia Brescia
- (Italy) Martina Caregaro
- (Argentina) Nadia Podoroska
- (Hungary) Fanny Stollár

The following player received entry by a lucky loser spot:

- (Italy) Cristiana Ferrando

The following player received entry by a special exempt:

- (Paraguay) Montserrat González

== Champions ==
=== Singles ===
- (Belgium) Elise Mertens def. (France) Amandine Hesse, 6–4, 6–3

=== Doubles ===
- (Belgium) Ysaline Bonaventure / (Belgium) Elise Mertens def. (Argentina) María Irigoyen / (Czech Republic) Barbora Krejčíková, 6–4, 4–6, [10–6]
