= 2015 Abierto Victoria – Singles =

Singles
- 2015 Abierto Victoria

Final
- Champion: (Belgium) Elise Mertens
- Runner-up: (France) Amandine Hesse
- Score: 6–4, 6–3

Events
| Singles | Doubles |
| ← 2014 · | Abierto Victoria | · 2016 → |

Diāna Marcinkēviča was the defending champion, but she lost in qualifying.

Elise Mertens won the title, defeating Amandine Hesse in the final, 6–4, 6–3.

== Seeds ==
1. (Spain) Lourdes Domínguez Lino (quarterfinals)
2. (Spain) Sílvia Soler Espinosa (second round)
3. (France) Pauline Parmentier (semifinals)
4. (Czech Republic) Barbora Krejčíková (second round)
5. (Belgium) Ysaline Bonaventure (second round)
6. (Croatia) Tereza Mrdeža (withdrew)
7. (Turkey) İpek Soylu (second round)
8. (France) Alizé Lim (second round)

== Main draw ==
=== Key ===
- Q = Qualifier
- WC = Wild card
- LL = Lucky loser
- Alt = Alternate
- SE = Special exempt
- PR = Protected ranking
- ITF = ITF entry
- JE = Junior exempt
- w/o = Walkover
- r = Retired
- d = Defaulted
- SR = Special ranking

=== Finals ===
Semifinals
(Mexico) Marcela Zacarías | 6 | 2 | 4
(France) Amandine Hesse | 3 | 6 | 6
3 | (France) Pauline Parmentier | 3 | 3
(Belgium) Elise Mertens | 6 | 6

Final
(France) Amandine Hesse | 4 | 3
(Belgium) Elise Mertens | 6 | 6

=== Top half ===
First round
1 | (Spain) L Domínguez Lino | 7 | 6
(Czech Republic) B Štefková | 5 | 3
(Argentina) P Ormaechea | 6 | 3 | 2
(United States) G Min | 4 | 6 | 6
(Mexico) M Zacarías | 4 | 6 | 6
Q | (Italy) G Brescia | 6 | 3 | 4
(Netherlands) I de Vroome | 1 | 4
8 | (France) A Lim | 6 | 6
4 | (Czech Republic) B Krejčíková | 6 | 7^{8}
Q | (Italy) M Caregaro | 1 | 6^{6}
(Russia) M Melnikova | 6 | 4 | 5
(United States) K Ahn | 3 | 6 | 7
(France) A Hesse | 6 | 3 | 6
(Slovenia) D Jakupović | 3 | 6 | 3
WC | (Mexico) X Hermoso | 0 | 1
7 | (Turkey) İ Soylu | 6 | 6

Second round
1 | (Spain) L Domínguez Lino | 1 | 6 | 7
(United States) G Min | 6 | 4 | 5
(Mexico) M Zacarías | 3 | 6 | 6
8 | (France) A Lim | 6 | 3 | 1
4 | (Czech Republic) B Krejčíková | 3 | 4
(United States) K Ahn | 6 | 6
(France) A Hesse | 6 | 6
7 | (Turkey) İ Soylu | 0 | 2

Quarterfinals
1 | (Spain) L Domínguez Lino | 3 | 1
(Mexico) M Zacarías | 6 | 6
(United States) K Ahn | 3 | 5
(France) A Hesse | 6 | 7

Semifinals
(Mexico) M Zacarías | 6 | 2 | 4
(France) A Hesse | 3 | 6 | 6

=== Bottom half ===
First round
5 | (Belgium) Y Bonaventure | 6 | 6
(Bulgaria) A Naydenova | 0 | 4
(Brazil) G Cé | 6 | 6
WC | (Mexico) SD Monarrez Yesaki | 3 | 3
(Switzerland) C Perrin | 6 | 1 | 5
WC | (Mexico) AS Sánchez | 4 | 6 | 7
Q | (Hungary) F Stollár | 5 | 4
3 | (France) P Parmentier | 7 | 6
LL | (Italy) C Ferrando | 6 | 6^{8} | 6
SE | (Paraguay) M González | 3 | 7^{10} | 3
(Belgium) E Mertens | 6 | 6
WC | (Mexico) C Gorches | 0 | 3
(Argentina) M Irigoyen | 2 | 1
Q | (Argentina) N Podoroska | 6 | 6
(Mexico) V Rodríguez | 2 | 6 | 1
2 | (Spain) S Soler Espinosa | 6 | 4 | 6

Second round
5 | (Belgium) Y Bonaventure | 4 | 3
(Brazil) G Cé | 6 | 6
WC | (Mexico) AS Sánchez | 6^{4} | 3
3 | (France) P Parmentier | 7^{7} | 6
LL | (Italy) C Ferrando | 2 | 7^{7} | 2
(Belgium) E Mertens | 6 | 6^{5} | 6
Q | (Argentina) N Podoroska | 7^{7} | 6
2 | (Spain) S Soler Espinosa | 6^{4} | 1

Quarterfinals
(Brazil) G Cé | 2 | 1
3 | (France) P Parmentier | 6 | 6
(Belgium) E Mertens | 6 | 6
Q | (Argentina) N Podoroska | 3 | 2

Semifinals
3 | (France) P Parmentier | 3 | 3
(Belgium) E Mertens | 6 | 6
