= 2015 Abierto Victoria – Doubles =

Doubles
- 2015 Abierto Victoria

Final
- Champions: (Belgium) Ysaline Bonaventure (Belgium) Elise Mertens
- Runners-up: (Argentina) María Irigoyen (Czech Republic) Barbora Krejčíková
- Score: 6–4, 4–6, [10–6]

Events
Singles	Doubles
← 2014 ·	Abierto Victoria	· 2016 →

Maria Fernanda Alves and Patricia Maria Țig were the defending champions, but Țig chose to compete in Wuhan instead. Alves partnered with Gabriela Cé, but lost in the semifinals to Ysaline Bonaventure and Elise Mertens.

Bonaventure and Mertens then went on to win the title, defeating María Irigoyen and Barbora Krejčíková in the final, 6–4, 4–6, [10–6].

== Seeds ==
1. (Argentina) María Irigoyen / (Czech Republic) Barbora Krejčíková (final)
2. (Belgium) Ysaline Bonaventure / (Belgium) Elise Mertens (champions)
3. (France) Alizé Lim / (Spain) Sílvia Soler Espinosa (first round)
4. (Chile) Alexa Guarachi / (Chinese Taipei) Hsu Chieh-yu (first round)

== Draw ==
=== Key ===
- Q = Qualifier
- WC = Wild card
- LL = Lucky loser
- Alt = Alternate
- SE = Special exempt
- PR = Protected ranking
- ITF = ITF entry
- JE = Junior exempt
- w/o = Walkover
- r = Retired
- d = Defaulted
- SR = Special ranking

First round
1	(Argentina) M Irigoyen (Czech Republic) B Krejčíková	6	6^{7}	[10]
(France) A Hesse (France) P Parmentier	4	7^{9}	[4]
WC	(Mexico) C Betancourt (Mexico) X Hermoso	1	2
(Argentina) P Ormaechea (Dominican Republic) F Segarelli	6	6
4	(Chile) A Guarachi (Chinese Taipei) C-y Hsu	6	5	[9]
(Latvia) D Marcinkēviča (Russia) M Melnikova	3	7	[11]
(United Kingdom) T Moore (Switzerland) C Perrin	6	0
(Netherlands) I de Vroome (Turkey) İ Soylu	2	0^{r}
(Slovenia) T Majerič (Bulgaria) A Naydenova	4	3
(Mexico) V Rodríguez (Mexico) M Zacarías	6	6
(Brazil) MF Alves (Brazil) G Cé	6	6
3	(France) A Lim (Spain) S Soler Espinosa	4	3
WC	(Brazil) C Alves (Mexico) C Gorches	1	4
WC	(Italy) G Brescia (Italy) M Caregaro	6	6
(Paraguay) M González (Mexico) AS Sánchez	7	2	[6]
2	(Belgium) Y Bonaventure (Belgium) E Mertens	5	6	[10]

Quarterfinals
1	(Argentina) M Irigoyen (Czech Republic) B Krejčíková	6	6
(Argentina) P Ormaechea (Dominican Republic) F Segarelli	3	3
(Latvia) D Marcinkēviča (Russia) M Melnikova	7^{8}	3	[7]
(United Kingdom) T Moore (Switzerland) C Perrin	6^{6}	6	[10]
(Mexico) V Rodríguez (Mexico) M Zacarías	6	4	[8]
(Brazil) MF Alves (Brazil) G Cé	2	6	[10]
WC	(Italy) G Brescia (Italy) M Caregaro	2	1
2	(Belgium) Y Bonaventure (Belgium) E Mertens	6	6

Semifinals
1	(Argentina) M Irigoyen (Czech Republic) B Krejčíková	6	6
(United Kingdom) T Moore (Switzerland) C Perrin	3	2
(Brazil) MF Alves (Brazil) G Cé	1	1
2	(Belgium) Y Bonaventure (Belgium) E Mertens	6	6

Final
1	(Argentina) M Irigoyen (Czech Republic) B Krejčíková	4	6	[6]
2	(Belgium) Y Bonaventure (Belgium) E Mertens	6	4	[10]
