= 2018 Western & Southern Open – Women's doubles =

Women's doubles
- 2018 Western & Southern Open

Final
- Champions: (Czech Republic) Lucie Hradecká (Russia) Ekaterina Makarova
- Runners-up: (Belgium) Elise Mertens (Netherlands) Demi Schuurs
- Score: 6–2, 7–5

Details
- Seeds: 8

Events
Singles	men	women
Doubles	men	women
← 2017 ·	Western & Southern Open	· 2019 →

Latisha Chan and Martina Hingis were the defending champions, but Hingis retired from professional tennis at the end of 2017 and Chan chose to prepare for the Asian Games instead.

Lucie Hradecká and Ekaterina Makarova won the title, defeating Elise Mertens and Demi Schuurs in the final, 6–2, 7–5.

Tímea Babos will regain the WTA no. 1 doubles ranking at the end of the tournament as Chan did not defend her title. Kateřina Siniaková was also in contention for the top ranking at the start of the tournament.

== Seeds ==
The top four seeds received a bye into the second round.

1. (Czech Republic) Barbora Krejčíková / (Czech Republic) Kateřina Siniaková (quarterfinals)
2. (Hungary) Tímea Babos / (France) Kristina Mladenovic (quarterfinals)
3. (Czech Republic) Andrea Sestini Hlaváčková / (Czech Republic) Barbora Strýcová (quarterfinals)
4. (Slovenia) Andreja Klepač / (Spain) María José Martínez Sánchez (quarterfinals)
5. (United States) Nicole Melichar / (Czech Republic) Květa Peschke (second round, retired)
6. (Belgium) Elise Mertens / (Netherlands) Demi Schuurs (final)
7. (Czech Republic) Lucie Hradecká / (Russia) Ekaterina Makarova (champions)
8. (Romania) Irina-Camelia Begu / (Romania) Monica Niculescu (first round)

== Draw ==
=== Key ===
- Q = Qualifier
- WC = Wild card
- LL = Lucky loser
- Alt = Alternate
- ITF = ITF entry
- PR = Protected ranking
- SR = Special ranking
- SE = Special exempt
- JE = Junior exempt
- JR = Junior Accelerator Programme entrant
- CO = College Accelerator Programme entrant
- NG = Next Gen Accelerator Program entrant
- w/o = Walkover
- r = Retired
- d = Defaulted

=== Finals ===
Semifinals
6	(Belgium) Elise Mertens (Netherlands) Demi Schuurs	6	6
Alt	(United States) Kaitlyn Christian (United States) Sabrina Santamaria	1	4
(Russia) Anastasia Pavlyuchenkova (Latvia) Anastasija Sevastova	3	3
7	(Czech Republic) Lucie Hradecká (Russia) Ekaterina Makarova	6	6

Final
6	(Belgium) Elise Mertens (Netherlands) Demi Schuurs	2	5
7	(Czech Republic) Lucie Hradecká (Russia) Ekaterina Makarova	6	7

=== Top half ===
First round
(Romania) R Olaru (Russia) V Zvonareva	6	4	[10]
(United States) V King (Slovenia) K Srebotnik	3	6	[3]
(Spain) L Arruabarrena (Belgium) K Flipkens	6^{5}	4
WC	(United States) J Brady (United States) C Dolehide	7^{7}	6
(Australia) A Tomljanović (China) S Zheng	3	2
6	(Belgium) E Mertens (Netherlands) D Schuurs	6	6
WC	(United States) L Davis (United States) N Gibbs	0	1
(France) A Cornet (Serbia) A Krunić	6	6
(China) X Han (Croatia) D Jurak	7^{7}	7
(Poland) A Rosolska (United States) A Spears	6^{4}	5
Alt	(United States) K Christian (United States) S Santamaria	7	7
8	(Romania) I-C Begu (Romania) M Niculescu	5	5

Second round
1	(Czech Republic) B Krejčíková (Czech Republic) K Siniaková	4	6	[10]
(Romania) R Olaru (Russia) V Zvonareva	6	4	[7]
WC	(United States) J Brady (United States) C Dolehide	6^{5}	7	[7]
6	(Belgium) E Mertens (Netherlands) D Schuurs	7^{7}	5	[10]
4	(Slovenia) A Klepač (Spain) MJ Martínez Sánchez	5	6	[10]
(France) A Cornet (Serbia) A Krunić	7	4	[2]
(China) X Han (Croatia) D Jurak	6	1	[7]
Alt	(United States) K Christian (United States) S Santamaria	1	6	[10]

Quarterfinals
1	(Czech Republic) B Krejčíková (Czech Republic) K Siniaková	4	1
6	(Belgium) E Mertens (Netherlands) D Schuurs	6	6
4	(Slovenia) A Klepač (Spain) MJ Martínez Sánchez	6^{2}	2
Alt	(United States) K Christian (United States) S Santamaria	7^{7}	6

Semifinals
6	(Belgium) E Mertens (Netherlands) D Schuurs	6	6
Alt	(United States) K Christian (United States) S Santamaria	1	4

=== Bottom half ===
First round
5	(United States) N Melichar (Czech Republic) K Peschke	6	6
(Australia) M Adamczak (Ukraine) L Kichenok	1	3
(Russia) A Pavlyuchenkova (Latvia) A Sevastova	2	6	[13]
(Chinese Taipei) S-w Hsieh (Belarus) A Sabalenka	6	3	[11]
(Ukraine) N Kichenok (Australia) An Rodionova	7^{7}	6
(Slovenia) D Jakupović (Czech Republic) R Voráčová	6^{5}	1
7	(Czech Republic) L Hradecká (Russia) E Makarova	5	4
(United States) B Mattek-Sands (Czech Republic) L Šafářová	7	4^{r}
(United Kingdom) J Konta (Latvia) J Ostapenko	6	6
(United States) R Atawo (Germany) A-L Grönefeld	1	0
(Japan) S Aoyama (Belarus) L Marozava	6	6
(Australia) D Gavrilova (Estonia) A Kontaveit	4	0

Second round
5	(United States) N Melichar (Czech Republic) K Peschke	2	2^{r}
(Russia) A Pavlyuchenkova (Latvia) A Sevastova	6	5
(Ukraine) N Kichenok (Australia) An Rodionova	2	0^{r}
3	(Czech Republic) A Sestini Hlaváčková (Czech Republic) B Strýcová	6	0
7	(Czech Republic) L Hradecká (Russia) E Makarova	1	7^{7}	[10]
(United Kingdom) J Konta (Latvia) J Ostapenko	6	6^{4}	[5]
(Japan) S Aoyama (Belarus) L Marozava	5	6^{2}
2	(Hungary) T Babos (France) K Mladenovic	7	7^{7}

Quarterfinals
(Russia) A Pavlyuchenkova (Latvia) A Sevastova	7^{7}	6
3	(Czech Republic) A Sestini Hlaváčková (Czech Republic) B Strýcová	6^{1}	4
7	(Czech Republic) L Hradecká (Russia) E Makarova	4	7	[10]
2	(Hungary) T Babos (France) K Mladenovic	6	5	[6]

Semifinals
(Russia) A Pavlyuchenkova (Latvia) A Sevastova	3	3
7	(Czech Republic) L Hradecká (Russia) E Makarova	6	6
