= 2022 Qatar Total Open – Doubles =

Doubles
- 2022 Qatar Total Open

Final
- Champions: (United States) Coco Gauff (United States) Jessica Pegula
- Runners-up: (Russia) Veronika Kudermetova (Belgium) Elise Mertens
- Score: 3–6, 7–5, [10–5]

Details
- Draw: 28
- Seeds: 8

Events
Singles	Doubles
- Qatar Total Open

Coco Gauff and Jessica Pegula defeated Veronika Kudermetova and Elise Mertens in the final, 3–6, 7–5, [10–5] to win the doubles tennis title at the 2022 Qatar Open.

Nicole Melichar-Martinez and Demi Schuurs were the defending champions, but did not compete together. Melichar-Martinez partnered Alexa Guarachi, but lost in the second round to Kirsten Flipkens and Alison Van Uytvanck. Schuurs partnered Chan Hao-ching, but lost in the first round to Natela Dzalamidze and Tereza Martincová.

== Seeds ==
The top four seeds received a bye into the second round.

1. (Czech Republic) Barbora Krejčíková / (Czech Republic) Kateřina Siniaková (quarterfinals, retired)
2. (Japan) Ena Shibahara / (China) Zhang Shuai (quarterfinals)
3. (Russia) Veronika Kudermetova / (Belgium) Elise Mertens (final)
4. (Canada) Gabriela Dabrowski / (Mexico) Giuliana Olmos (second round)
5. (Chile) Alexa Guarachi / (United States) Nicole Melichar-Martinez (second round)
6. (Ukraine) Lyudmyla Kichenok / (Latvia) Jeļena Ostapenko (first round)
7. (United States) Desirae Krawczyk / (Australia) Ellen Perez (second round)
8. (Kazakhstan) Anna Danilina / (Brazil) Beatriz Haddad Maia (second round)

== Draw ==
Key

- Q = Qualifier
- WC = Wild card
- LL = Lucky loser
- Alt = Alternate
- ITF = ITF entry
- PR = Protected ranking
- SR = Special ranking
- SE = Special exempt
- JE = Junior exempt
- JR = Junior Accelerator Programme entrant
- CO = College Accelerator Programme entrant
- NG = Next Gen Accelerator Program entrant
- w/o = Walkover
- r = Retired
- d = Defaulted

=== Finals ===
Semifinals
(Czech Republic) Lucie Hradecká (India) Sania Mirza	0	3
3	(Russia) Veronika Kudermetova (Belgium) Elise Mertens	6	6
(Japan) Shuko Aoyama (Serbia) Aleksandra Krunić	3	2
(United States) Coco Gauff (United States) Jessica Pegula	6	6

Final
3	(Russia) Veronika Kudermetova (Belgium) Elise Mertens	6	5	[5]
(United States) Coco Gauff (United States) Jessica Pegula	3	7	[10]

=== Top half ===
First round
PR	(Norway) U Eikeri (Russia) A Panova	6	6
(Japan) E Hozumi (Japan) M Ninomiya	4	4
(Romania) M Niculescu (Russia) V Zvonareva	4	3
(Czech Republic) L Hradecká (India) S Mirza	6	6
PR	(United Kingdom) S Murray Sharan (Netherlands) B Schoofs	0	4
8	(Kazakhstan) A Danilina (Brazil) B Haddad Maia	6	6
(Romania) I Bara (Slovakia) K Kučová	6^{3}	2
(Ukraine) M Kostyuk (Belarus) A Sasnovich	7^{7}	6
WC	(Sweden) M Björklund (United Kingdom) E Webley-Smith	3	3
(Belgium) K Flipkens (Belgium) A Van Uytvanck	6	6
(Switzerland) V Golubic (Netherlands) A Rus	1	6	[7]
5	(Chile) A Guarachi (United States) N Melichar-Martinez	6	4	[10]

Second round
1	(Czech Republic) B Krejčíková (Czech Republic) K Siniaková	6	6
PR	(Norway) U Eikeri (Russia) A Panova	2	1
(Czech Republic) L Hradecká (India) S Mirza	7	7
8	(Kazakhstan) A Danilina (Brazil) B Haddad Maia	5	5
3	(Russia) V Kudermetova (Belgium) E Mertens	6	6
(Ukraine) M Kostyuk (Belarus) A Sasnovich	0	4
(Belgium) K Flipkens (Belgium) A Van Uytvanck	5	6	[11]
5	(Chile) A Guarachi (United States) N Melichar-Martinez	7	4	[9]

Quarterfinals
1	(Czech Republic) B Krejčíková (Czech Republic) K Siniaková	6^{5}	3^{r}
(Czech Republic) L Hradecká (India) S Mirza	7^{7}	4
3	(Russia) V Kudermetova (Belgium) E Mertens	6	6
(Belgium) K Flipkens (Belgium) A Van Uytvanck	2	3

Semifinals
(Czech Republic) L Hradecká (India) S Mirza	0	3
3	(Russia) V Kudermetova (Belgium) E Mertens	6	6

=== Bottom half ===
First round
7	(United States) D Krawczyk (Australia) E Perez	6	6
Alt	(Georgia (country)) O Kalashnikova (Belgium) M Zanevska	3	2
(Russia) K Rakhimova (Denmark) C Tauson	7	2	[7]
PR	(Poland) A Rosolska (New Zealand) E Routliffe	5	6	[10]
WC	(Qatar) M Al-Naimi (Turkey) İ Öz	2	3
(Japan) S Aoyama (Serbia) A Krunić	6	6
6	(Ukraine) L Kichenok (Latvia) J Ostapenko	3	2
(United States) C Gauff (United States) J Pegula	6	6
(Croatia) D Jurak Schreiber (Italy) J Paolini	5	4
(Hungary) A Bondár (Romania) J Cristian	7	6
(Russia) N Dzalamidze (Czech Republic) T Martincová	6	6
(Chinese Taipei) H-c Chan (Netherlands) D Schuurs	2	3

Second round
7	(United States) D Krawczyk (Australia) E Perez	6	6^{3}	[6]
PR	(Poland) A Rosolska (New Zealand) E Routliffe	1	7^{7}	[10]
(Japan) S Aoyama (Serbia) A Krunić	6^{2}	6	[16]
4	(Canada) G Dabrowski (Mexico) G Olmos	7^{7}	2	[14]
(United States) C Gauff (United States) J Pegula	w/o
(Hungary) A Bondár (Romania) J Cristian
(Russia) N Dzalamidze (Czech Republic) T Martincová	7	3	[8]
2	(Japan) E Shibahara (China) S Zhang	5	6	[10]

Quarterfinals
PR	(Poland) A Rosolska (New Zealand) E Routliffe	1	2
(Japan) S Aoyama (Serbia) A Krunić	6	6
(United States) C Gauff (United States) J Pegula	3	7	[10]
2	(Japan) E Shibahara (China) S Zhang	6	5	[7]

Semifinals
(Japan) S Aoyama (Serbia) A Krunić	3	2
(United States) C Gauff (United States) J Pegula	6	6
