= Abierto Victoria =

ITF Women's Tour
- Event name: Victoria
- Location: Ciudad Victoria, Mexico
- Venue: Club Campestre de Ciudad Victoria
- Category: ITF Women's Circuit
- Surface: Hard
- Draw: 32S/32Q/16D
- Prize money: $50,000

The Abierto Victoria was a tournament for professional female tennis players played on outdoor hard courts. The event was classified as a $50,000 ITF Women's Circuit tournament and was held in Ciudad Victoria, Mexico, from 2012 to 2015.

== Past finals ==
=== Singles ===
Year	Champion	Runner-up	Score
2015	(Belgium) Elise Mertens	(France) Amandine Hesse	6–4, 6–3
2014	(Latvia) Diāna Marcinkēviča	(Spain) Paula Badosa Gibert	6–7^{(2–7)}, 6–3, 6–1
2013	(Mexico) Victoria Rodríguez	(Mexico) Ana Sofía Sánchez	6–2, 4–6, 4–0, retired
2012	(Russia) Nika Kukharchuk	(Mexico) Victoria Rodríguez	7–5, 6–0

=== Doubles ===
Year	Champions	Runners-up	Score
2015	(Belgium) Ysaline Bonaventure (Belgium) Elise Mertens	(Argentina) María Irigoyen (Czech Republic) Barbora Krejčíková	6–4, 4–6, [10–6]
2014	(Brazil) Maria Fernanda Alves (Romania) Patricia Maria Țig	(Mexico) Carolina Betancourt (Slovakia) Lenka Wienerová	6–1, 6–2
2013	(Bolivia) María Fernanda Álvarez Terán (Argentina) María Irigoyen	(United States) Hsu Chieh-yu (Mexico) Ana Sofía Sánchez	7–6^{(7–2)}, 6–3
2012	(Mexico) Camila Fuentes (United States) Blair Shankle	(Mexico) Alejandra Cisneros (Mexico) Victoria Rodríguez	7–6^{(7–4)}, 6–1
