= 2014 ITF Women's Circuit (October–December) =

The 2014 ITF Women's Circuit is the 2014 edition of the second-tier tour for women's professional tennis. It is organised by the International Tennis Federation and is a tier below the WTA Tour. The ITF Women's Circuit includes tournaments with prize money ranging from $10,000 up to $100,000.

== Key ==
$100,000 tournaments
$75,000 tournaments
$50,000 tournaments
$25,000 tournaments
$15,000 tournaments
$10,000 tournaments
All titles

== Month ==
=== October ===
Week of	Tournament	Winner	Runners-up	Semifinalists	Quarterfinalists
October 6	Internacional Femenil Monterrey; Monterrey, Mexico; Hard $50,000; Singles – Doubles	(Belgium) An-Sophie Mestach; 6–3, 7–5	(Spain) Lourdes Domínguez Lino	(Israel) Julia Glushko (Romania) Patricia Maria Țig	(United States) Irina Falconi (Romania) Alexandra Cadanțu (Colombia) Mariana Duque (Slovenia) Nastja Kolar
October 6	Internacional Femenil Monterrey; Monterrey, Mexico; Hard $50,000; Singles – Doubles	(Spain) Lourdes Domínguez Lino (Colombia) Mariana Duque; 6–3, 7–6^{(7–4)}	(Belgium) Elise Mertens (Netherlands) Arantxa Rus	(Israel) Julia Glushko (Romania) Patricia Maria Țig	(United States) Irina Falconi (Romania) Alexandra Cadanțu (Colombia) Mariana Duque (Slovenia) Nastja Kolar
October 6	Bangkok, Thailand; Hard $25,000; Singles and doubles draws	(Russia) Daria Gavrilova; 7–6^{(7–4)}, 6–3	(Uzbekistan) Sabina Sharipova	(Thailand) Varatchaya Wongteanchai (Australia) Monique Adamczak	(Thailand) Nicha Lertpitaksinchai (Thailand) Peangtarn Plipuech (Netherlands) Lesley Kerkhove (China) Lu Jiajing
October 6	Bangkok, Thailand; Hard $25,000; Singles and doubles draws	(China) Liu Chang (China) Lu Jiajing; 6–4, 6–3	(Russia) Daria Gavrilova (Russia) Irina Khromacheva	(Thailand) Varatchaya Wongteanchai (Australia) Monique Adamczak	(Thailand) Nicha Lertpitaksinchai (Thailand) Peangtarn Plipuech (Netherlands) Lesley Kerkhove (China) Lu Jiajing
October 6	Rock Hill, United States; Hard $25,000; Singles and doubles draws	(United States) CiCi Bellis; 6–4, 6–0	(United States) Lauren Embree	(Germany) Nina Zander (Greece) Despina Papamichail	(Canada) Sharon Fichman (Netherlands) Cindy Burger (United States) Sanaz Marand (South Africa) Chanel Simmonds
October 6	Rock Hill, United States; Hard $25,000; Singles and doubles draws	(Netherlands) Cindy Burger (Canada) Sharon Fichman; 4–6, 6–1, [10–6]	(Greece) Despina Papamichail (Austria) Janina Toljan	(Germany) Nina Zander (Greece) Despina Papamichail	(Canada) Sharon Fichman (Netherlands) Cindy Burger (United States) Sanaz Marand (South Africa) Chanel Simmonds
October 6	Cairns, Australia; Hard $15,000; Singles and doubles draws	(Japan) Ayaka Okuno; 6–1, 7–5	(Sweden) Ellen Allgurin	(Japan) Mai Minokoshi (Australia) Karis Ryan	(Australia) Ashling Sumner (Japan) Mana Ayukawa (Australia) Priscilla Hon (Australia) Alison Bai
October 6	Cairns, Australia; Hard $15,000; Singles and doubles draws	(Australia) Jessica Moore (Australia) Abbie Myers; 6–2, 6–2	(Australia) Alison Bai (Japan) Ayaka Okuno	(Japan) Mai Minokoshi (Australia) Karis Ryan	(Australia) Ashling Sumner (Japan) Mana Ayukawa (Australia) Priscilla Hon (Australia) Alison Bai
October 6	Albena, Bulgaria; Clay $10,000; Singles and doubles draws	(Czech Republic) Pernilla Mendesová; 7–5, 6–2	(Czech Republic) Karolína Stuchlá	(Czech Republic) Lenka Kunčíková (Bulgaria) Tanya Raykova	(Germany) Nicola Geuer (Bulgaria) Julia Stamatova (Bulgaria) Elena Jetcheva (Romania) Simona Ionescu
October 6	Albena, Bulgaria; Clay $10,000; Singles and doubles draws	(Czech Republic) Lenka Kunčíková (Czech Republic) Karolína Stuchlá; 6–2, 6–4	(Moldova) Julia Helbet (Bulgaria) Isabella Shinikova	(Czech Republic) Lenka Kunčíková (Bulgaria) Tanya Raykova	(Germany) Nicola Geuer (Bulgaria) Julia Stamatova (Bulgaria) Elena Jetcheva (Romania) Simona Ionescu
October 6	Sharm el-Sheikh, Egypt; Hard $10,000; Singles and doubles draws	(Spain) Nuria Párrizas Díaz; 6–4, 6–3	(Serbia) Vojislava Lukić	(Italy) Giorgia Pinto (Turkey) Melis Sezer	(United Kingdom) Eden Silva (China) Wang Xiyao (Ukraine) Marianna Zakarlyuk (Portugal) Inês Murta
October 6	Sharm el-Sheikh, Egypt; Hard $10,000; Singles and doubles draws	(India) Sharmada Balu (China) Wang Xiyao; 7–5, 2–6, [11–9]	(United Kingdom) Harriet Dart (United Kingdom) Eden Silva	(Italy) Giorgia Pinto (Turkey) Melis Sezer	(United Kingdom) Eden Silva (China) Wang Xiyao (Ukraine) Marianna Zakarlyuk (Portugal) Inês Murta
October 6	Santa Margherita di Pula, Italy; Clay $10,000; Singles and doubles draws	(Italy) Claudia Giovine; 6–3, 6–3	(Netherlands) Janneke Wikkerink	(Australia) Alexandra Nancarrow (Bosnia and Herzegovina) Jelena Simić	(Germany) Anne Schäfer (Germany) Anna Klasen (Germany) Charlotte Klasen (France) Jade Suvrijn
October 6	Santa Margherita di Pula, Italy; Clay $10,000; Singles and doubles draws	(Switzerland) Lisa Sabino (Germany) Anne Schäfer; 6–4, 5–7, [10–6]	(Germany) Anna Klasen (Germany) Charlotte Klasen	(Australia) Alexandra Nancarrow (Bosnia and Herzegovina) Jelena Simić	(Germany) Anne Schäfer (Germany) Anna Klasen (Germany) Charlotte Klasen (France) Jade Suvrijn
October 6	Shymkent, Kazakhstan; Clay $10,000; Singles and doubles draws	(Russia) Sofya Zhuk; 6–2, 6–3	(Russia) Margarita Lazareva	(Russia) Daria Lodikova (Georgia (country)) Sofia Kvatsabaia	(Kazakhstan) Ekaterina Klyueva (Kazakhstan) Alexandra Grinchishina (Moldova) Adriana Sosnovschi (Belarus) Polina Pekhova
October 6	Shymkent, Kazakhstan; Clay $10,000; Singles and doubles draws	(Uzbekistan) Albina Khabibulina (Kazakhstan) Ekaterina Klyueva; 6–4, 6–4	(Russia) Daria Lodikova (Belarus) Polina Pekhova	(Russia) Daria Lodikova (Georgia (country)) Sofia Kvatsabaia	(Kazakhstan) Ekaterina Klyueva (Kazakhstan) Alexandra Grinchishina (Moldova) Adriana Sosnovschi (Belarus) Polina Pekhova
October 6	Lima, Peru; Clay $10,000; Singles and doubles draws	(Brazil) Nathaly Kurata; 6–1, 6–1	(Chile) Fernanda Brito	(Chile) Andrea Koch Benvenuto (Peru) Bianca Botto	(Argentina) Constanza Vega (Argentina) Victoria Bosio (Brazil) Eduarda Piai (Argentina) Guadalupe Pérez Rojas
October 6	Lima, Peru; Clay $10,000; Singles and doubles draws	(Chile) Fernanda Brito (Brazil) Eduarda Piai; 4–6, 7–6^{(11–9)}, [10–6]	(Argentina) Victoria Bosio (Dominican Republic) Francesca Segarelli	(Chile) Andrea Koch Benvenuto (Peru) Bianca Botto	(Argentina) Constanza Vega (Argentina) Victoria Bosio (Brazil) Eduarda Piai (Argentina) Guadalupe Pérez Rojas
October 6	Antalya, Turkey; Hard $10,000; Singles and doubles draws	(Liechtenstein) Kathinka von Deichmann; 6–2, 6–7^{(6–8)}, 6–4	(Czech Republic) Kateřina Kramperová	(Japan) Kanami Tsuji (China) Ye Qiuyu	(Italy) Camilla Rosatello (China) Zhang Ying (Turkey) Ayla Aksu (Germany) Katharina Gerlach
October 6	Antalya, Turkey; Hard $10,000; Singles and doubles draws	(China) Ye Qiuyu (China) You Xiaodi; 7–6^{(7–3)}, 5–7, [10–6]	(Czech Republic) Kateřina Kramperová (Romania) Daiana Negreanu	(Japan) Kanami Tsuji (China) Ye Qiuyu	(Italy) Camilla Rosatello (China) Zhang Ying (Turkey) Ayla Aksu (Germany) Katharina Gerlach
October 13	Open GDF Suez de Touraine; Joué-lès-Tours, France; Hard (indoor) $50,000; Singles – Doubles	(Germany) Carina Witthöft; 6–3, 7–6^{(8–6)}	(Poland) Urszula Radwańska	(France) Manon Arcangioli (Romania) Andreea Mitu	(Netherlands) Quirine Lemoine (Latvia) Jeļena Ostapenko (Italy) Giulia Gatto-Monticone (Italy) Alberta Brianti
October 13	Open GDF Suez de Touraine; Joué-lès-Tours, France; Hard (indoor) $50,000; Singles – Doubles	(France) Stéphanie Foretz (France) Amandine Hesse; Default	(Italy) Alberta Brianti (Italy) Maria Elena Camerin	(France) Manon Arcangioli (Romania) Andreea Mitu	(Netherlands) Quirine Lemoine (Latvia) Jeļena Ostapenko (Italy) Giulia Gatto-Monticone (Italy) Alberta Brianti
October 13	Abierto Tampico; Tampico, Mexico; Hard $50,000; Singles – Doubles	(Colombia) Mariana Duque; 3–6, 6–1, 7–6^{(7–4)}	(Belgium) An-Sophie Mestach	(Spain) Lourdes Domínguez Lino (United States) Irina Falconi	(Israel) Julia Glushko (Ukraine) Kateryna Bondarenko (Romania) Patricia Maria Țig (Netherlands) Arantxa Rus
October 13	Abierto Tampico; Tampico, Mexico; Hard $50,000; Singles – Doubles	(Croatia) Petra Martić (United States) Maria Sanchez; 3–6, 6–3, [10–2]	(Ukraine) Kateryna Bondarenko (Russia) Valeria Savinykh	(Spain) Lourdes Domínguez Lino (United States) Irina Falconi	(Israel) Julia Glushko (Ukraine) Kateryna Bondarenko (Romania) Patricia Maria Țig (Netherlands) Arantxa Rus
October 13	Makinohara, Japan; Grass $25,000; Singles and doubles draws	(Germany) Tatjana Maria; 6–1, 6–2	(Japan) Shuko Aoyama	(Japan) Riko Sawayanagi (Japan) Junri Namigata	(Netherlands) Indy de Vroome (Poland) Magdalena Fręch (Croatia) Iva Mekovec (Japan) Nao Hibino
October 13	Makinohara, Japan; Grass $25,000; Singles and doubles draws	(Germany) Tatjana Maria (Japan) Miki Miyamura; 6–3, 6–1	(Japan) Makoto Ninomiya (Japan) Mari Tanaka	(Japan) Riko Sawayanagi (Japan) Junri Namigata	(Netherlands) Indy de Vroome (Poland) Magdalena Fręch (Croatia) Iva Mekovec (Japan) Nao Hibino
October 13	Goyang, South Korea; Hard $25,000; Singles and doubles draws	(Poland) Magda Linette; 6–3, 3–6, 6–3	(Czech Republic) Renata Voráčová	(South Korea) Han Sung-hee (Japan) Hiroko Kuwata	(Russia) Anastasia Pivovarova (Japan) Yurika Sema (China) Lu Jiajing (Chinese Taipei) Chang Kai-chen
October 13	Goyang, South Korea; Hard $25,000; Singles and doubles draws	(South Korea) Hong Hyun-hui (South Korea) Lee So-ra; 6–4, 6–2	(South Korea) Han Sung-hee (South Korea) Lee Hye-min	(South Korea) Han Sung-hee (Japan) Hiroko Kuwata	(Russia) Anastasia Pivovarova (Japan) Yurika Sema (China) Lu Jiajing (Chinese Taipei) Chang Kai-chen
October 13	Bangkok, Thailand; Hard $25,000; Singles and doubles draws	(Russia) Elizaveta Kulichkova; 6–1, 6–0	(Netherlands) Lesley Kerkhove	(Thailand) Tamarine Tanasugarn (Croatia) Tereza Mrdeža	(Japan) Misa Eguchi (China) Liu Chang (Thailand) Varatchaya Wongteanchai (Thailand) Kamonwan Buayam
October 13	Bangkok, Thailand; Hard $25,000; Singles and doubles draws	(Thailand) Varatchaya Wongteanchai (Thailand) Varunya Wongteanchai; 6–2, 5–7, [10–7]	(Czech Republic) Martina Borecká (Netherlands) Lesley Kerkhove	(Thailand) Tamarine Tanasugarn (Croatia) Tereza Mrdeža	(Japan) Misa Eguchi (China) Liu Chang (Thailand) Varatchaya Wongteanchai (Thailand) Kamonwan Buayam
October 13	Florence, United States; Hard $25,000; Singles and doubles draws	(United States) CiCi Bellis; 6–2, 6–1	(Belgium) Ysaline Bonaventure	(Slovenia) Petra Rampre (United States) Bernarda Pera	(Greece) Despina Papamichail (Australia) Samantha Harris (Slovenia) Nastja Kolar (United States) Jan Abaza
October 13	Florence, United States; Hard $25,000; Singles and doubles draws	(United States) Jamie Loeb (United States) Sanaz Marand; 6–3, 7–6^{(7–5)}	(United States) Danielle Lao (United States) Keri Wong	(Slovenia) Petra Rampre (United States) Bernarda Pera	(Greece) Despina Papamichail (Australia) Samantha Harris (Slovenia) Nastja Kolar (United States) Jan Abaza
October 13	Toowoomba, Australia; Hard $15,000; Singles and doubles draws	(Sweden) Ellen Allgurin; 6–1, 6–3	(Australia) Jessica Moore	(Australia) Isabella Holland (United Kingdom) Katy Dunne	(Japan) Mana Ayukawa (Hungary) Naomi Totka (United Kingdom) Katie Boulter (Australia) Alison Bai
October 13	Toowoomba, Australia; Hard $15,000; Singles and doubles draws	(Australia) Jessica Moore (Australia) Abbie Myers; 6–3, 6–3	(Australia) Lizette Cabrera (Australia) Priscilla Hon	(Australia) Isabella Holland (United Kingdom) Katy Dunne	(Japan) Mana Ayukawa (Hungary) Naomi Totka (United Kingdom) Katie Boulter (Australia) Alison Bai
October 13	Sharm el-Sheikh, Egypt; Hard $10,000; Singles and doubles draws	(Spain) Nuria Párrizas Díaz; 6–2, 6–4	(Ukraine) Marianna Zakarlyuk	(United Kingdom) Laura Deigman (Russia) Anna Morgina	(Italy) Giorgia Pinto (Italy) Miriana Tona (Portugal) Inês Murta (Egypt) Ola Abou Zekry
October 13	Sharm el-Sheikh, Egypt; Hard $10,000; Singles and doubles draws	(Ukraine) Diana Bogoliy (Ukraine) Anastasia Kharchenko; 6–3, 6–1	(Egypt) Ola Abou Zekry (Russia) Ekaterina Yashina	(United Kingdom) Laura Deigman (Russia) Anna Morgina	(Italy) Giorgia Pinto (Italy) Miriana Tona (Portugal) Inês Murta (Egypt) Ola Abou Zekry
October 13	Heraklion, Greece; Hard $10,000; Singles and doubles draws	(Slovakia) Viktória Kužmová; 6–4, 6–3	(Austria) Barbara Haas	(Italy) Deborah Chiesa (Bulgaria) Julia Stamatova	(Czech Republic) Simona Heinová (Czech Republic) Karolína Muchová (Austria) Julia Grabher (Spain) Olga Parres Azcoitia
October 13	Heraklion, Greece; Hard $10,000; Singles and doubles draws	(Japan) Yumi Nakano (Bulgaria) Julia Stamatova; 6–1, 6–2	(Bosnia and Herzegovina) Anita Husarić (France) Laëtitia Sarrazin	(Italy) Deborah Chiesa (Bulgaria) Julia Stamatova	(Czech Republic) Simona Heinová (Czech Republic) Karolína Muchová (Austria) Julia Grabher (Spain) Olga Parres Azcoitia
October 13	Santa Margherita di Pula, Italy; Clay $10,000; Singles and doubles draws	(Italy) Corinna Dentoni; 6–3, 6–3	(Germany) Anna Klasen	(Italy) Georgia Brescia (Australia) Alexandra Nancarrow	(Germany) Charlotte Klasen (Spain) Ariadna Martí Riembau (Romania) Diana Buzean (Romania) Raluca Elena Platon
October 13	Santa Margherita di Pula, Italy; Clay $10,000; Singles and doubles draws	(Germany) Anna Klasen (Germany) Charlotte Klasen; 6–2, 6–3	(Romania) Diana Buzean (Romania) Raluca Elena Platon	(Italy) Georgia Brescia (Australia) Alexandra Nancarrow	(Germany) Charlotte Klasen (Spain) Ariadna Martí Riembau (Romania) Diana Buzean (Romania) Raluca Elena Platon
October 13	Lima, Peru; Clay $10,000; Singles and doubles draws	(Peru) Bianca Botto; 6–3, 6–4	(Paraguay) Camila Giangreco Campiz	(Colombia) María Paulina Pérez (Chile) Fernanda Brito	(Brazil) Nathaly Kurata (Paraguay) Sara Giménez (Argentina) Victoria Bosio (Dominican Republic) Francesca Segarelli
October 13	Lima, Peru; Clay $10,000; Singles and doubles draws	(Chile) Fernanda Brito (Brazil) Eduarda Piai; 7–6^{(7–0)}, 6–4	(Colombia) María Paulina Pérez (Colombia) Paula Andrea Pérez	(Colombia) María Paulina Pérez (Chile) Fernanda Brito	(Brazil) Nathaly Kurata (Paraguay) Sara Giménez (Argentina) Victoria Bosio (Dominican Republic) Francesca Segarelli
October 13	Antalya, Turkey; Hard $10,000; Singles and doubles draws	(Liechtenstein) Kathinka von Deichmann; 4–6, 7–6^{(7–4)}, 6–4	(Romania) Daiana Negreanu	(Serbia) Nina Stojanović (Romania) Andreea Ghițescu	(France) Caroline Roméo (Belgium) Marie Benoît (Czech Republic) Kateřina Kramperová (Germany) Lisa Ponomar
October 13	Antalya, Turkey; Hard $10,000; Singles and doubles draws	(Poland) Agata Barańska (France) Clothilde de Bernardi; 6–3, 6–3	(Germany) Katharina Hering (Netherlands) Jainy Scheepens	(Serbia) Nina Stojanović (Romania) Andreea Ghițescu	(France) Caroline Roméo (Belgium) Marie Benoît (Czech Republic) Kateřina Kramperová (Germany) Lisa Ponomar
October 20	Internationaux Féminins de la Vienne; Poitiers, France; Hard (indoor) $100,000; Singles – Doubles	(Hungary) Tímea Babos; 6–3, 4–6, 7–5	(France) Océane Dodin	(Croatia) Ana Konjuh (Czech Republic) Tereza Smitková	(Switzerland) Timea Bacsinszky (Belarus) Aliaksandra Sasnovich (Romania) Andreea Mitu (Sweden) Johanna Larsson
October 20	Internationaux Féminins de la Vienne; Poitiers, France; Hard (indoor) $100,000; Singles – Doubles	(Czech Republic) Andrea Hlaváčková (Czech Republic) Lucie Hradecká; 6–1, 7–5	(Poland) Katarzyna Piter (Ukraine) Maryna Zanevska	(Croatia) Ana Konjuh (Czech Republic) Tereza Smitková	(Switzerland) Timea Bacsinszky (Belarus) Aliaksandra Sasnovich (Romania) Andreea Mitu (Sweden) Johanna Larsson
October 20	Challenger Banque Nationale de Saguenay; Saguenay, Canada; Hard (indoor) $50,000; Singles – Doubles	(France) Julie Coin; 7–5, 6–3	(Serbia) Jovana Jakšić	(Liechtenstein) Stephanie Vogt (Belgium) Ysaline Bonaventure	(Austria) Pia König (Switzerland) Romina Oprandi (United States) Maria Sanchez (United States) Caitlin Whoriskey
October 20	Challenger Banque Nationale de Saguenay; Saguenay, Canada; Hard (indoor) $50,000; Singles – Doubles	(Belgium) Ysaline Bonaventure (United Kingdom) Nicola Slater; 6–4, 6–4	(Canada) Sonja Molnar (United States) Caitlin Whoriskey	(Liechtenstein) Stephanie Vogt (Belgium) Ysaline Bonaventure	(Austria) Pia König (Switzerland) Romina Oprandi (United States) Maria Sanchez (United States) Caitlin Whoriskey
October 20	USTA Tennis Classic of Macon; Macon, United States; Hard $50,000; Singles – Doubles	(Ukraine) Kateryna Bondarenko; 6–4, 7–5	(United States) Grace Min	(Croatia) Petra Martić (United States) Irina Falconi	(United States) Ellie Halbauer (United States) Julia Boserup (United States) Sanaz Marand (United States) Madison Brengle
October 20	USTA Tennis Classic of Macon; Macon, United States; Hard $50,000; Singles – Doubles	(United States) Madison Brengle (United States) Alexa Glatch; 6–0, 7–5	(United States) Anna Tatishvili (United States) Ashley Weinhold	(Croatia) Petra Martić (United States) Irina Falconi	(United States) Ellie Halbauer (United States) Julia Boserup (United States) Sanaz Marand (United States) Madison Brengle
October 20	Perth, Australia; Hard $25,000; Singles and doubles draws	(Sweden) Rebecca Peterson; 6–3, 6–0	(Japan) Hiroko Kuwata	(Chinese Taipei) Hsu Chieh-yu (Australia) Monique Adamczak	(Japan) Rika Fujiwara (Thailand) Varatchaya Wongteanchai (Sweden) Ellen Allgurin (Japan) Mai Minokoshi
October 20	Perth, Australia; Hard $25,000; Singles and doubles draws	(Ukraine) Veronika Kapshay (France) Alizé Lim; 6–2, 2–6, [10–7]	(Australia) Jessica Moore (Australia) Abbie Myers	(Chinese Taipei) Hsu Chieh-yu (Australia) Monique Adamczak	(Japan) Rika Fujiwara (Thailand) Varatchaya Wongteanchai (Sweden) Ellen Allgurin (Japan) Mai Minokoshi
October 20	Hamamatsu, Japan; Carpet $25,000; Singles and doubles draws	(Japan) Riko Sawayanagi; 2–6, 6–2, 6–3	(Japan) Junri Namigata	(Poland) Magdalena Fręch (Japan) Shuko Aoyama	(Japan) Akiko Yonemura (Japan) Mari Tanaka (Japan) Nao Hibino (Netherlands) Indy de Vroome
October 20	Hamamatsu, Japan; Carpet $25,000; Singles and doubles draws	(Germany) Tatjana Maria (Japan) Miki Miyamura; 5–7, 6–2, [10–5]	(Japan) Makoto Ninomiya (Japan) Mari Tanaka	(Poland) Magdalena Fręch (Japan) Shuko Aoyama	(Japan) Akiko Yonemura (Japan) Mari Tanaka (Japan) Nao Hibino (Netherlands) Indy de Vroome
October 20	Ciudad Victoria, Mexico; Hard $25,000; Singles and doubles draws	(Latvia) Diāna Marcinkēviča; 6–7^{(2–7)}, 6–3, 6–1	(Spain) Paula Badosa	(Mexico) Ana Sofía Sánchez (Canada) Heidi El Tabakh	(Slovakia) Chantal Škamlová (Croatia) Silvia Njirić (Romania) Alexandra Cadanțu (Czech Republic) Tereza Martincová
October 20	Ciudad Victoria, Mexico; Hard $25,000; Singles and doubles draws	(Brazil) Maria Fernanda Alves (Romania) Patricia Maria Țig; 6–1, 6–2	(Mexico) Carolina Betancourt (Slovakia) Lenka Wienerová	(Mexico) Ana Sofía Sánchez (Canada) Heidi El Tabakh	(Slovakia) Chantal Škamlová (Croatia) Silvia Njirić (Romania) Alexandra Cadanțu (Czech Republic) Tereza Martincová
October 20	Phuket, Thailand; Hard (indoor) $15,000; Singles and doubles draws	(France) Irina Ramialison; 6–4, 5–7, 6–4	(China) Xun Fangying	(Ukraine) Alyona Sotnikova (Uzbekistan) Sabina Sharipova	(Russia) Anastasia Pivovarova (Thailand) Kamonwan Buayam (Japan) Yuuki Tanaka (Russia) Eugeniya Pashkova
October 20	Phuket, Thailand; Hard (indoor) $15,000; Singles and doubles draws	(Thailand) Nicha Lertpitaksinchai (Thailand) Peangtarn Plipuech; 7–6^{(7–0)}, 2–6, [10–4]	(Ukraine) Oleksandra Korashvili (Ukraine) Alyona Sotnikova	(Ukraine) Alyona Sotnikova (Uzbekistan) Sabina Sharipova	(Russia) Anastasia Pivovarova (Thailand) Kamonwan Buayam (Japan) Yuuki Tanaka (Russia) Eugeniya Pashkova
October 20	Pereira, Colombia; Clay $10,000; Singles and doubles draws	(Chile) Andrea Koch Benvenuto; 7–6^{(7–1)}, 6–2	(United States) Nicole Frenkel	(Hungary) Lilla Barzó (Argentina) Victoria Bosio	(United Kingdom) Anna Brogan (Argentina) Carla Lucero (France) Brandy Mina (United States) Usue Maitaine Arconada
October 20	Pereira, Colombia; Clay $10,000; Singles and doubles draws	(Argentina) Victoria Bosio (France) Brandy Mina; 7–6^{(7–3)}, 6–4	(Argentina) Ana Madcur (Brazil) Nathália Rossi	(Hungary) Lilla Barzó (Argentina) Victoria Bosio	(United Kingdom) Anna Brogan (Argentina) Carla Lucero (France) Brandy Mina (United States) Usue Maitaine Arconada
October 20	Sharm el-Sheikh, Egypt; Hard $10,000; Singles and doubles draws	(Russia) Polina Leykina; 6–2, 6–0	(Switzerland) Jil Teichmann	(Russia) Polina Golubovskaya (Ukraine) Marianna Zakarlyuk	(Poland) Katarzyna Kawa (Egypt) Sandra Samir (Italy) Alice Matteucci (Romania) Elena-Teodora Cadar
October 20	Sharm el-Sheikh, Egypt; Hard $10,000; Singles and doubles draws	(Ukraine) Diana Bogoliy (Russia) Polina Leykina; 6–2, 6–1	(Italy) Giulia Bruzzone (Romania) Elena-Teodora Cadar	(Russia) Polina Golubovskaya (Ukraine) Marianna Zakarlyuk	(Poland) Katarzyna Kawa (Egypt) Sandra Samir (Italy) Alice Matteucci (Romania) Elena-Teodora Cadar
October 20	Heraklion, Greece; Hard $10,000; Singles and doubles draws	(Hungary) Réka-Luca Jani; 4–6, 6–3, 7–6^{(8–6)}	(Austria) Barbara Haas	(Bulgaria) Julia Stamatova (Japan) Yumi Nakano	(Czech Republic) Karolína Muchová (France) Laëtitia Sarrazin (Italy) Deborah Chiesa (Serbia) Natalija Kostić
October 20	Heraklion, Greece; Hard $10,000; Singles and doubles draws	(Hungary) Réka-Luca Jani (Bulgaria) Julia Stamatova; 6–4, 6–4	(Hungary) Anna Bondár (Hungary) Dalma Gálfi	(Bulgaria) Julia Stamatova (Japan) Yumi Nakano	(Czech Republic) Karolína Muchová (France) Laëtitia Sarrazin (Italy) Deborah Chiesa (Serbia) Natalija Kostić
October 20	Santa Margherita di Pula, Italy; Clay $10,000; Singles and doubles draws	(Romania) Diana Buzean; 6–2, 6–4	(Italy) Martina Spigarelli	(Poland) Anna Korzeniak (Italy) Alice Savoretti	(Italy) Alice Balducci (Switzerland) Lisa Sabino (China) Li Yuenu (Bosnia and Herzegovina) Jelena Simić
October 20	Santa Margherita di Pula, Italy; Clay $10,000; Singles and doubles draws	(Romania) Diana Buzean (Romania) Raluca Elena Platon; 6–2, 7–5	(Netherlands) Inger van Dijkman (Netherlands) Janneke Wikkerink	(Poland) Anna Korzeniak (Italy) Alice Savoretti	(Italy) Alice Balducci (Switzerland) Lisa Sabino (China) Li Yuenu (Bosnia and Herzegovina) Jelena Simić
October 20	Lima, Peru; Clay $10,000; Singles and doubles draws	(Peru) Bianca Botto; 6–3, 6–1	(Argentina) Constanza Vega	(Argentina) Julieta Lara Estable (Mexico) Camila Fuentes	(Brazil) Eduarda Piai (Chile) Fernanda Brito (Argentina) Sofía Luini (Brazil) Carolina Alves
October 20	Lima, Peru; Clay $10,000; Singles and doubles draws	(Argentina) Sofía Luini (Argentina) Guadalupe Pérez Rojas; 6–4, 6–3	(Chile) Cecilia Costa Melgar (Brazil) Nathaly Kurata	(Argentina) Julieta Lara Estable (Mexico) Camila Fuentes	(Brazil) Eduarda Piai (Chile) Fernanda Brito (Argentina) Sofía Luini (Brazil) Carolina Alves
October 20	Stockholm, Sweden; Hard (indoor) $10,000; Singles and doubles draws	(United Kingdom) Naomi Cavaday; 7–6^{(7–3)}, 6–4	(Germany) Tayisiya Morderger	(Sweden) Jacqueline Cabaj Awad (Netherlands) Kelly Versteeg	(Russia) Margarita Lazareva (Sweden) Louise Brunskog (France) Estelle Guisard (Germany) Nora Niedmers
October 20	Stockholm, Sweden; Hard (indoor) $10,000; Singles and doubles draws	(Sweden) Anette Munozova (France) Victoria Muntean; 2–6, 6–4, [10–8]	(Serbia) Tamara Čurović (Russia) Margarita Lazareva	(Sweden) Jacqueline Cabaj Awad (Netherlands) Kelly Versteeg	(Russia) Margarita Lazareva (Sweden) Louise Brunskog (France) Estelle Guisard (Germany) Nora Niedmers
October 20	Antalya, Turkey; Hard $10,000; Singles and doubles draws	(Czech Republic) Jesika Malečková; 6–3, 6–3	(France) Shérazad Reix	(Liechtenstein) Kathinka von Deichmann (Hungary) Vanda Lukács	(Belgium) Marie Benoît (Germany) Lisa Matviyenko (Russia) Ksenia Gaydarzhi (France) Clothilde de Bernardi
October 20	Antalya, Turkey; Hard $10,000; Singles and doubles draws	Doubles competition not completed due to bad weather.		(Liechtenstein) Kathinka von Deichmann (Hungary) Vanda Lukács	(Belgium) Marie Benoît (Germany) Lisa Matviyenko (Russia) Ksenia Gaydarzhi (France) Clothilde de Bernardi
October 27	Tevlin Women's Challenger; Toronto, Canada; Hard (indoor) $50,000; Singles – Doubles	(Canada) Gabriela Dabrowski; 6–4, 2–6, 7–6^{(9–7)}	(United States) Maria Sanchez	(United States) Taylor Townsend (Germany) Tatjana Maria	(Israel) Julia Glushko (Switzerland) Romina Oprandi (United States) Caitlin Whoriskey (Czech Republic) Marie Bouzková
October 27	Tevlin Women's Challenger; Toronto, Canada; Hard (indoor) $50,000; Singles – Doubles	(United States) Maria Sanchez (United States) Taylor Townsend; 7–5, 4–6, [15–13]	(Canada) Gabriela Dabrowski (Germany) Tatjana Maria	(United States) Taylor Townsend (Germany) Tatjana Maria	(Israel) Julia Glushko (Switzerland) Romina Oprandi (United States) Caitlin Whoriskey (Czech Republic) Marie Bouzková
October 27	Open GDF Suez Nantes Atlantique; Nantes, France; Hard (indoor) $50,000+H; Singles – Doubles	(Czech Republic) Kateřina Siniaková; 7–5, 6–2	(Tunisia) Ons Jabeur	(Slovakia) Anna Karolína Schmiedlová (Croatia) Ana Konjuh	(France) Virginie Razzano (Italy) Gioia Barbieri (Ukraine) Nadiia Kichenok (Romania) Andreea Mitu
October 27	Open GDF Suez Nantes Atlantique; Nantes, France; Hard (indoor) $50,000+H; Singles – Doubles	(Ukraine) Lyudmyla Kichenok (Ukraine) Nadiia Kichenok; 6–2, 6–3	(France) Stéphanie Foretz (France) Amandine Hesse	(Slovakia) Anna Karolína Schmiedlová (Croatia) Ana Konjuh	(France) Virginie Razzano (Italy) Gioia Barbieri (Ukraine) Nadiia Kichenok (Romania) Andreea Mitu
October 27	John Newcombe Women's Pro Challenge; New Braunfels, United States; Hard $50,000; Singles – Doubles	(United States) Irina Falconi; 7–6^{(7–3)}, 6–2	(United States) Jennifer Brady	(United States) Julia Boserup (Japan) Mayo Hibi	(France) Mathilde Johansson (United States) Alexa Glatch (Brazil) Paula Cristina Gonçalves (United States) Grace Min
October 27	John Newcombe Women's Pro Challenge; New Braunfels, United States; Hard $50,000; Singles – Doubles	(Paraguay) Verónica Cepede Royg (Colombia) Mariana Duque; 6–0, 6–3	(United States) Alexa Glatch (United States) Bernarda Pera	(United States) Julia Boserup (Japan) Mayo Hibi	(France) Mathilde Johansson (United States) Alexa Glatch (Brazil) Paula Cristina Gonçalves (United States) Grace Min
October 27	Margaret River, Australia; Hard $25,000; Singles and doubles draws	(Croatia) Tereza Mrdeža; 6–3, 6–3	(Sweden) Rebecca Peterson	(Japan) Risa Ozaki (Australia) Isabella Holland	(Sweden) Susanne Celik (Australia) Alison Bai (Australia) Maddison Inglis (France) Alizé Lim
October 27	Margaret River, Australia; Hard $25,000; Singles and doubles draws	(Japan) Miyabi Inoue (Thailand) Varatchaya Wongteanchai; 4–6, 6–4, [10–3]	(Germany) Carolin Daniels (Germany) Laura Schaeder	(Japan) Risa Ozaki (Australia) Isabella Holland	(Sweden) Susanne Celik (Australia) Alison Bai (Australia) Maddison Inglis (France) Alizé Lim
October 27	Sharm el-Sheikh, Egypt; Hard $25,000; Singles and doubles draws	(Russia) Margarita Gasparyan; 6–3, 6–0	(Bulgaria) Elitsa Kostova	(Czech Republic) Pernilla Mendesová (Ukraine) Olga Ianchuk	(Bulgaria) Aleksandrina Naydenova (Russia) Polina Vinogradova (Spain) Sara Sorribes Tormo (Russia) Alexandra Panova
October 27	Sharm el-Sheikh, Egypt; Hard $25,000; Singles and doubles draws	(Italy) Alice Matteucci (Belgium) Elise Mertens; 6–7^{(1–7)}, 7–6^{(7–4)}, [10–6]	(Romania) Ioana Loredana Roșca (Bulgaria) Julia Terziyska	(Czech Republic) Pernilla Mendesová (Ukraine) Olga Ianchuk	(Bulgaria) Aleksandrina Naydenova (Russia) Polina Vinogradova (Spain) Sara Sorribes Tormo (Russia) Alexandra Panova
October 27	Istanbul, Turkey; Hard (indoor) $25,000; Singles and doubles draws	(Czech Republic) Barbora Krejčíková; 6–1, 6–4	(Switzerland) Viktorija Golubic	(Croatia) Jana Fett (Russia) Marta Sirotkina	(Turkey) İpek Soylu (Russia) Valeria Solovyeva (Czech Republic) Renata Voráčová (Italy) Alberta Brianti
October 27	Istanbul, Turkey; Hard (indoor) $25,000; Singles and doubles draws	(Switzerland) Xenia Knoll (Turkey) İpek Soylu; 6–2, 6–4	(Turkey) Ayla Aksu (Turkey) Müge Topsel	(Croatia) Jana Fett (Russia) Marta Sirotkina	(Turkey) İpek Soylu (Russia) Valeria Solovyeva (Czech Republic) Renata Voráčová (Italy) Alberta Brianti
October 27	Phuket, Thailand; Hard (indoor) $15,000; Singles and doubles draws	(France) Irina Ramialison; 6–3, 6–0	(United Kingdom) Katie Boulter	(Thailand) Nicha Lertpitaksinchai (Czech Republic) Barbora Štefková	(Chinese Taipei) Lee Pei-chi (Ukraine) Oleksandra Korashvili (Kazakhstan) Anna Danilina (Ukraine) Alyona Sotnikova
October 27	Phuket, Thailand; Hard (indoor) $15,000; Singles and doubles draws	(Thailand) Nicha Lertpitaksinchai (Thailand) Peangtarn Plipuech; 7–5, 6–3	(Thailand) Kamonwan Buayam (Chinese Taipei) Lee Pei-chi	(Thailand) Nicha Lertpitaksinchai (Czech Republic) Barbora Štefková	(Chinese Taipei) Lee Pei-chi (Ukraine) Oleksandra Korashvili (Kazakhstan) Anna Danilina (Ukraine) Alyona Sotnikova
October 27	Pereira, Colombia; Clay $10,000; Singles and doubles draws	(Hungary) Lilla Barzó; 6–4, 6–2	(Chile) Andrea Koch Benvenuto	(Argentina) Victoria Bosio (United States) Nicole Frenkel	(United Kingdom) Anna Brogan (Colombia) Daniela Pedraza Novak (Argentina) Carla Lucero (Brazil) Nathália Rossi
October 27	Pereira, Colombia; Clay $10,000; Singles and doubles draws	(United Kingdom) Anna Brogan (Colombia) María Fernanda Herazo; 6–3, 6–2	(Venezuela) Mariaryeni Gutiérrez (United States) Alexandra Valenstein	(Argentina) Victoria Bosio (United States) Nicole Frenkel	(United Kingdom) Anna Brogan (Colombia) Daniela Pedraza Novak (Argentina) Carla Lucero (Brazil) Nathália Rossi
October 27	Heraklion, Greece; Hard $10,000; Singles and doubles draws	(Hungary) Dalma Gálfi; 6–3, 6–0	(Austria) Julia Grabher	(Hungary) Réka-Luca Jani (Czech Republic) Petra Rohanová	(Germany) Julia Wachaczyk (Hungary) Anna Bondár (Czech Republic) Dominika Paterová (Croatia) Tena Lukas
October 27	Heraklion, Greece; Hard $10,000; Singles and doubles draws	(Romania) Raluca Georgiana Șerban (Romania) Oana Georgeta Simion; 6–4, 6–2	(Serbia) Natalija Kostić (Serbia) Nevena Selaković	(Hungary) Réka-Luca Jani (Czech Republic) Petra Rohanová	(Germany) Julia Wachaczyk (Hungary) Anna Bondár (Czech Republic) Dominika Paterová (Croatia) Tena Lukas
October 27	Santa Margherita di Pula, Italy; Clay $10,000; Singles and doubles draws	(Italy) Martina Caregaro; 6–4, 6–4	(Italy) Stefania Rubini	(Switzerland) Lisa Sabino (Italy) Anna Floris	(Italy) Nicole Fossa Huergo (Japan) Nozomi Fujioka (France) Camille Cheli (Italy) Alice Balducci
October 27	Santa Margherita di Pula, Italy; Clay $10,000; Singles and doubles draws	(Italy) Georgia Brescia (Switzerland) Lisa Sabino; 6–4, 6–3	(France) Camille Cheli (Italy) Marcella Cucca	(Switzerland) Lisa Sabino (Italy) Anna Floris	(Italy) Nicole Fossa Huergo (Japan) Nozomi Fujioka (France) Camille Cheli (Italy) Alice Balducci
October 27	Oslo, Norway; Hard (indoor) $10,000; Singles and doubles draws	(Norway) Emma Flood; 6–3, 6–3	(Switzerland) Tess Sugnaux	(Ukraine) Nadiya Kolb (Switzerland) Sara Ottomano	(United States) Alexa Guarachi (Russia) Daria Lodikova (Norway) Malene Helgø (Spain) Arabela Fernández Rabener
October 27	Oslo, Norway; Hard (indoor) $10,000; Singles and doubles draws	(United States) Alexa Guarachi (Serbia) Nina Stojanović; 6–4, 7–6^{(9–7)}	(Ukraine) Maryna Kolb (Ukraine) Nadiya Kolb	(Ukraine) Nadiya Kolb (Switzerland) Sara Ottomano	(United States) Alexa Guarachi (Russia) Daria Lodikova (Norway) Malene Helgø (Spain) Arabela Fernández Rabener
October 27	Benicarló, Spain; Clay $10,000; Singles and doubles draws	(Venezuela) Andrea Gámiz; 6–3, 6–1	(Australia) Alexandra Nancarrow	(Spain) Aliona Bolsova Zadoinov (Italy) Alice Savoretti	(Czech Republic) Diana Šumová (United Kingdom) Amanda Carreras (Spain) Inés Ferrer Suárez (Spain) Cristina Sánchez Quintanar
October 27	Benicarló, Spain; Clay $10,000; Singles and doubles draws	(Spain) Aliona Bolsova Zadoinov (Venezuela) Andrea Gámiz; 6–4, 6–1	(Spain) Inés Ferrer Suárez (Australia) Alexandra Nancarrow	(Spain) Aliona Bolsova Zadoinov (Italy) Alice Savoretti	(Czech Republic) Diana Šumová (United Kingdom) Amanda Carreras (Spain) Inés Ferrer Suárez (Spain) Cristina Sánchez Quintanar
October 27	Stockholm, Sweden; Hard (indoor) $10,000; Singles and doubles draws	(United Kingdom) Naomi Cavaday; 5–7, 6–3, 6–3	(Russia) Margarita Lazareva	(France) Estelle Guisard (Sweden) Jacqueline Cabaj Awad	(Sweden) Cornelia Lister (Serbia) Tamara Čurović (Germany) Sina Haas (Sweden) Brenda Njuki
October 27	Stockholm, Sweden; Hard (indoor) $10,000; Singles and doubles draws	(Serbia) Tamara Čurović (Russia) Margarita Lazareva; 6–3, 7–6^{(7–3)}	(Germany) Nora Niedmers (Germany) Caroline Werner	(France) Estelle Guisard (Sweden) Jacqueline Cabaj Awad	(Sweden) Cornelia Lister (Serbia) Tamara Čurović (Germany) Sina Haas (Sweden) Brenda Njuki
October 27	Aegon Pro-Series Loughborough; Loughborough, United Kingdom; Hard (indoor) $10,000; Singles and doubles draws	(Republic of Ireland) Amy Bowtell; 6–7^{(6–8)}, 6–1, 7–6^{(7–3)}	(France) Shérazad Reix	(Czech Republic) Martina Borecká (Belgium) Elyne Boeykens	(Belgium) Magali Kempen (United Kingdom) Harriet Dart (United Kingdom) Manisha Foster (United Kingdom) Freya Christie
October 27	Aegon Pro-Series Loughborough; Loughborough, United Kingdom; Hard (indoor) $10,000; Singles and doubles draws	(Czech Republic) Martina Borecká (France) Shérazad Reix; 6–3, 6–2	(Republic of Ireland) Amy Bowtell (United Kingdom) Lucy Brown	(Czech Republic) Martina Borecká (Belgium) Elyne Boeykens	(Belgium) Magali Kempen (United Kingdom) Harriet Dart (United Kingdom) Manisha Foster (United Kingdom) Freya Christie

=== November ===
Week of	Tournament	Winner	Runners-up	Semifinalists	Quarterfinalists
November 3	Bendigo Women's International; Bendigo, Australia; Hard $50,000; Singles – Doubles	(Japan) Eri Hozumi; 7–6^{(7–5)}, 5–7, 6–2	(Japan) Risa Ozaki	(Sweden) Susanne Celik (Sweden) Rebecca Peterson	(Japan) Miyabi Inoue (China) Yang Zhaoxuan (Thailand) Varatchaya Wongteanchai (Russia) Daria Gavrilova
November 3	Bendigo Women's International; Bendigo, Australia; Hard $50,000; Singles – Doubles	(Australia) Jessica Moore (Australia) Abbie Myers; 6–4, 6–0	(Australia) Naiktha Bains (Australia) Karolina Wlodarczak	(Sweden) Susanne Celik (Sweden) Rebecca Peterson	(Japan) Miyabi Inoue (China) Yang Zhaoxuan (Thailand) Varatchaya Wongteanchai (Russia) Daria Gavrilova
November 3	South Seas Island Resort Women's Pro Classic; Captiva Island, United States; Hard $50,000; Singles – Doubles	(Romania) Edina Gallovits-Hall; 6–2, 6–2	(Croatia) Petra Martić	(United States) Jennifer Brady (Germany) Tatjana Maria	(United States) Louisa Chirico (Canada) Gabriela Dabrowski (Brazil) Beatriz Haddad Maia (United States) Sachia Vickery
November 3	South Seas Island Resort Women's Pro Classic; Captiva Island, United States; Hard $50,000; Singles – Doubles	(Canada) Gabriela Dabrowski (United States) Anna Tatishvili; 6–3, 6–3	(United States) Asia Muhammad (United States) Maria Sanchez	(United States) Jennifer Brady (Germany) Tatjana Maria	(United States) Louisa Chirico (Canada) Gabriela Dabrowski (Brazil) Beatriz Haddad Maia (United States) Sachia Vickery
November 3	Sharm el-Sheikh, Egypt; Hard $25,000; Singles and doubles draws	(Russia) Evgeniya Rodina; 6–2, 6–2	(Germany) Laura Siegemund	(Spain) Sara Sorribes Tormo (Russia) Alexandra Panova	(Russia) Margarita Gasparyan (Ukraine) Olga Ianchuk (Ukraine) Anastasiya Vasylyeva (Greece) Maria Sakkari
November 3	Sharm el-Sheikh, Egypt; Hard $25,000; Singles and doubles draws	(Germany) Antonia Lottner (Germany) Laura Siegemund; 6–1, 6–1	(Ukraine) Olga Ianchuk (Slovenia) Nastja Kolar	(Spain) Sara Sorribes Tormo (Russia) Alexandra Panova	(Russia) Margarita Gasparyan (Ukraine) Olga Ianchuk (Ukraine) Anastasiya Vasylyeva (Greece) Maria Sakkari
November 3	Équeurdreville-Hainneville, France; Hard (indoor) $25,000; Singles and doubles draws	(France) Stéphanie Foretz; 5–2, ret.	(Ukraine) Anhelina Kalinina	(France) Julie Coin (France) Manon Arcangioli	(Germany) Tamara Korpatsch (France) Constance Sibille (Netherlands) Cindy Burger (Latvia) Jeļena Ostapenko
November 3	Équeurdreville-Hainneville, France; Hard (indoor) $25,000; Singles and doubles draws	(Russia) Olga Doroshina (Belarus) Lidziya Marozava; 6–3, 6–3	(France) Fanny Caramaro (France) Alice Ramé	(France) Julie Coin (France) Manon Arcangioli	(Germany) Tamara Korpatsch (France) Constance Sibille (Netherlands) Cindy Burger (Latvia) Jeļena Ostapenko
November 3	Aegon GB Pro-Series Bath; Bath, United Kingdom; Hard (indoor) $25,000; Singles and doubles draws	(Liechtenstein) Stephanie Vogt; 6–3, 7–6^{(7–3)}	(Italy) Alberta Brianti	(Turkey) Çağla Büyükakçay (Russia) Marta Sirotkina	(United Kingdom) Harriet Dart (Czech Republic) Martina Borecká (Czech Republic) Tereza Martincová (Switzerland) Viktorija Golubic
November 3	Aegon GB Pro-Series Bath; Bath, United Kingdom; Hard (indoor) $25,000; Singles and doubles draws	(Netherlands) Lesley Kerkhove (Switzerland) Xenia Knoll; 6–3, 6–1	(Serbia) Barbara Bonić (Turkey) Pemra Özgen	(Turkey) Çağla Büyükakçay (Russia) Marta Sirotkina	(United Kingdom) Harriet Dart (Czech Republic) Martina Borecká (Czech Republic) Tereza Martincová (Switzerland) Viktorija Golubic
November 3	Heraklion, Greece; Hard $10,000; Singles and doubles draws	(Hungary) Dalma Gálfi; 6–2, 4–6, 7–6^{(7–4)}	(Greece) Valentini Grammatikopoulou	(Poland) Natalia Siedliska (Belgium) Steffi Distelmans	(Germany) Julia Wachaczyk (Romania) Oana Georgeta Simion (Serbia) Natalija Kostić (Hungary) Anna Bondár
November 3	Heraklion, Greece; Hard $10,000; Singles and doubles draws	(Hungary) Anna Bondár (Hungary) Dalma Gálfi; 4–6, 6–3, [10–8]	(Croatia) Martina Bašić (Croatia) Tena Lukas	(Poland) Natalia Siedliska (Belgium) Steffi Distelmans	(Germany) Julia Wachaczyk (Romania) Oana Georgeta Simion (Serbia) Natalija Kostić (Hungary) Anna Bondár
November 3	Santa Margherita di Pula, Italy; Clay $10,000; Singles and doubles draws	(Germany) Anne Schäfer; 6–0, 6–3	(Italy) Claudia Giovine	(Italy) Martina Caregaro (Bosnia and Herzegovina) Jelena Simić	(Italy) Martina Trevisan (Italy) Stefania Rubini (Italy) Georgia Brescia (Switzerland) Lisa Sabino
November 3	Santa Margherita di Pula, Italy; Clay $10,000; Singles and doubles draws	(Italy) Georgia Brescia (Italy) Martina Caregaro; 3–6, 6–4, [10–6]	(Switzerland) Lisa Sabino (Germany) Anne Schäfer	(Italy) Martina Caregaro (Bosnia and Herzegovina) Jelena Simić	(Italy) Martina Trevisan (Italy) Stefania Rubini (Italy) Georgia Brescia (Switzerland) Lisa Sabino
November 3	Casablanca, Morocco; Clay $10,000; Singles and doubles draws	(Croatia) Ana Savić; 6–0, 6–3	(Russia) Valentina Kulikova	(Romania) Irina Fetecău (Croatia) Silvia Njirić	(Namibia) Lesedi Sheya Jacobs (Russia) Vera Aleshcheva (United Kingdom) Mirabelle Njoze (Portugal) Inês Murta
November 3	Casablanca, Morocco; Clay $10,000; Singles and doubles draws	(Portugal) Inês Murta (Spain) Olga Parres Azcoitia; 6–3, 6–4	(Italy) Martina Caciotti (Croatia) Silvia Njirić	(Romania) Irina Fetecău (Croatia) Silvia Njirić	(Namibia) Lesedi Sheya Jacobs (Russia) Vera Aleshcheva (United Kingdom) Mirabelle Njoze (Portugal) Inês Murta
November 3	Oslo, Norway; Hard (indoor) $10,000; Singles and doubles draws	(Denmark) Karen Barbat; 6–2, 6–2	(Sweden) Cornelia Lister	(Russia) Liubov Vasilyeva (Sweden) Fanny Östlund	(Germany) Caroline Übelhör (Ukraine) Nadiya Kolb (Spain) Arabela Fernández Rabener (Russia) Polina Novoselova
November 3	Oslo, Norway; Hard (indoor) $10,000; Singles and doubles draws	(United States) Alexa Guarachi (Russia) Daria Lodikova; 6–3, 2–6, [10–6]	(Ukraine) Maryna Kolb (Ukraine) Nadiya Kolb	(Russia) Liubov Vasilyeva (Sweden) Fanny Östlund	(Germany) Caroline Übelhör (Ukraine) Nadiya Kolb (Spain) Arabela Fernández Rabener (Russia) Polina Novoselova
November 3	Vinaròs, Spain; Clay $10,000; Singles and doubles draws	(United Kingdom) Amanda Carreras; 6–4, 6–1	(Czech Republic) Diana Šumová	(Spain) Inés Ferrer Suárez (Norway) Melanie Stokke	(Spain) Eva Guerrero Álvarez (Italy) Alice Savoretti (Spain) Aliona Bolsova Zadoinov (Spain) Eva Martínez Regalado
November 3	Vinaròs, Spain; Clay $10,000; Singles and doubles draws	(Belgium) Elke Lemmens (Spain) Ariadna Martí Riembau; 6–3, 4–6, [11–9]	(Spain) Yvonne Cavallé Riemers (Italy) Alice Savoretti	(Spain) Inés Ferrer Suárez (Norway) Melanie Stokke	(Spain) Eva Guerrero Álvarez (Italy) Alice Savoretti (Spain) Aliona Bolsova Zadoinov (Spain) Eva Martínez Regalado
November 3	Sousse, Tunisia; Hard $10,000; Singles and doubles draws	(Germany) Anna Klasen; 4–6, 7–5, 6–4	(Netherlands) Mandy Wagemaker	(Slovenia) Nina Potočnik (Romania) Cristina Ene	(Russia) Natela Dzalamidze (Russia) Maria Marfutina (United Kingdom) Francesca Stephenson (Austria) Janina Toljan
November 3	Sousse, Tunisia; Hard $10,000; Singles and doubles draws	(Russia) Natela Dzalamidze (Austria) Janina Toljan; 6–2, 6–1	(United Kingdom) Francesca Stephenson (Netherlands) Mandy Wagemaker	(Slovenia) Nina Potočnik (Romania) Cristina Ene	(Russia) Natela Dzalamidze (Russia) Maria Marfutina (United Kingdom) Francesca Stephenson (Austria) Janina Toljan
November 3	Antalya, Turkey; Clay $10,000; Singles and doubles draws	(Romania) Irina Maria Bara; 6–3, 6–2	(Turkey) Melis Sezer	(Russia) Shakhlo Saidova (Slovakia) Tereza Mihalíková	(Turkey) Ayla Aksu (Italy) Valeria Prosperi (Moldova) Anastasia Vdovenco (Germany) Lisa Ponomar
November 3	Antalya, Turkey; Clay $10,000; Singles and doubles draws	(Romania) Irina Maria Bara (Turkey) Melis Sezer; Walkover	(Germany) Lisa Ponomar (Russia) Shakhlo Saidova	(Russia) Shakhlo Saidova (Slovakia) Tereza Mihalíková	(Turkey) Ayla Aksu (Italy) Valeria Prosperi (Moldova) Anastasia Vdovenco (Germany) Lisa Ponomar
November 10	Al Habtoor Tennis Challenge; Dubai, United Arab Emirates; Hard $75,000; Singles – Doubles	(Romania) Alexandra Dulgheru; 6–3, 6–4	(Japan) Kimiko Date-Krumm	(Ukraine) Nadiia Kichenok (Russia) Vitalia Diatchenko	(Russia) Alexandra Panova (Romania) Andreea Mitu (Belgium) An-Sophie Mestach (Belgium) Alison Van Uytvanck
November 10	Al Habtoor Tennis Challenge; Dubai, United Arab Emirates; Hard $75,000; Singles – Doubles	(Russia) Vitalia Diatchenko (Russia) Alexandra Panova; 3–6, 6–2, [10–4]	(Ukraine) Lyudmyla Kichenok (Ukraine) Olga Savchuk	(Ukraine) Nadiia Kichenok (Russia) Vitalia Diatchenko	(Russia) Alexandra Panova (Romania) Andreea Mitu (Belgium) An-Sophie Mestach (Belgium) Alison Van Uytvanck
November 10	Bendigo Women's International; Bendigo, Australia; Hard $50,000; Singles – Doubles	(China) Liu Fangzhou; 6–4, 6–3	(Japan) Risa Ozaki	(China) Yang Zhaoxuan (Sweden) Susanne Celik	(Japan) Misa Eguchi (France) Alizé Lim (Australia) Jessica Moore (Thailand) Varatchaya Wongteanchai
November 10	Bendigo Women's International; Bendigo, Australia; Hard $50,000; Singles – Doubles	(Australia) Jessica Moore (Australia) Abbie Myers; 3–6, 6–1, [10–6]	(Thailand) Varatchaya Wongteanchai (Thailand) Varunya Wongteanchai	(China) Yang Zhaoxuan (Sweden) Susanne Celik	(Japan) Misa Eguchi (France) Alizé Lim (Australia) Jessica Moore (Thailand) Varatchaya Wongteanchai
November 10	Minsk, Belarus; Hard (indoor) $25,000; Singles and doubles draws	(Croatia) Ana Vrljić; 3–6, 6–4, 7–6^{(9–7)}	(Russia) Ekaterina Alexandrova	(Netherlands) Lesley Kerkhove (Belarus) Ilona Kremen	(Belarus) Sviatlana Pirazhenka (Russia) Viktoria Kamenskaya (Belarus) Vera Lapko (Ukraine) Elizaveta Ianchuk
November 10	Minsk, Belarus; Hard (indoor) $25,000; Singles and doubles draws	(Belarus) Ilona Kremen (Belarus) Lidziya Marozava; 6–3, 6–4	(Russia) Olga Doroshina (Georgia (country)) Sofia Shapatava	(Netherlands) Lesley Kerkhove (Belarus) Ilona Kremen	(Belarus) Sviatlana Pirazhenka (Russia) Viktoria Kamenskaya (Belarus) Vera Lapko (Ukraine) Elizaveta Ianchuk
November 10	Sharm el-Sheikh, Egypt; Hard $25,000; Singles and doubles draws	(Russia) Evgeniya Rodina; 5–7, 6–3, 6–2	(Germany) Laura Siegemund	(Russia) Margarita Gasparyan (Hungary) Réka-Luca Jani	(Russia) Polina Monova (Russia) Polina Vinogradova (Spain) Sara Sorribes Tormo (Russia) Victoria Kan
November 10	Sharm el-Sheikh, Egypt; Hard $25,000; Singles and doubles draws	(Belgium) Marie Benoît (Netherlands) Demi Schuurs; 6–4, 7–5	(Russia) Valentyna Ivakhnenko (Russia) Polina Monova	(Russia) Margarita Gasparyan (Hungary) Réka-Luca Jani	(Russia) Polina Monova (Russia) Polina Vinogradova (Spain) Sara Sorribes Tormo (Russia) Victoria Kan
November 10	Mumbai, India; Hard $25,000; Singles and doubles draws	(Russia) Marina Melnikova; 6–2, 7–6^{(7–4)}	(Slovenia) Tadeja Majerič	(United Kingdom) Emily Webley-Smith (Ukraine) Anastasiya Vasylyeva	(Austria) Patricia Mayr-Achleitner (Hong Kong) Wu Ho-ching (Ukraine) Sofiya Kovalets (India) Ankita Raina
November 10	Mumbai, India; Hard $25,000; Singles and doubles draws	(China) Lu Jiajing (India) Ankita Raina; 6–4, 1–6, [11–9]	(Thailand) Nicha Lertpitaksinchai (Thailand) Peangtarn Plipuech	(United Kingdom) Emily Webley-Smith (Ukraine) Anastasiya Vasylyeva	(Austria) Patricia Mayr-Achleitner (Hong Kong) Wu Ho-ching (Ukraine) Sofiya Kovalets (India) Ankita Raina
November 10	Orto-Lääkärit Open; Helsinki, Finland; Hard (indoor) $10,000; Singles – Doubles	(Republic of Ireland) Amy Bowtell; 6–2, 6–3	(Switzerland) Tess Sugnaux	(Denmark) Karen Barbat (Italy) Corinna Dentoni	(Slovakia) Natália Vajdová (Russia) Alexandra Artamonova (United States) Alexa Guarachi (Russia) Polina Novoselova
November 10	Orto-Lääkärit Open; Helsinki, Finland; Hard (indoor) $10,000; Singles – Doubles	(Finland) Emma Laine (Russia) Eugeniya Pashkova; 6–4, 6–0	(Finland) Mia Nicole Eklund (Finland) Olivia Pimiä	(Denmark) Karen Barbat (Italy) Corinna Dentoni	(Slovakia) Natália Vajdová (Russia) Alexandra Artamonova (United States) Alexa Guarachi (Russia) Polina Novoselova
November 10	Heraklion, Greece; Hard $10,000; Singles and doubles draws	(Serbia) Natalija Kostić; 6–0, 6–3	(Croatia) Tena Lukas	(Czech Republic) Miriam Kolodziejová (Czech Republic) Vendula Žovincová	(Czech Republic) Veronika Kolářová (Poland) Natalia Siedliska (Greece) Valentini Grammatikopoulou (Croatia) Martina Bašić
November 10	Heraklion, Greece; Hard $10,000; Singles and doubles draws	(Poland) Natalia Siedliska (Germany) Julia Wachaczyk; 6–2, 6–7^{(2–7)}, [10–6]	(Bosnia and Herzegovina) Anita Husarić (France) Marine Partaud	(Czech Republic) Miriam Kolodziejová (Czech Republic) Vendula Žovincová	(Czech Republic) Veronika Kolářová (Poland) Natalia Siedliska (Greece) Valentini Grammatikopoulou (Croatia) Martina Bašić
November 10	Casablanca, Morocco; Clay $10,000; Singles and doubles draws	(Croatia) Silvia Njirić; 6–1, 6–4	(France) Amandine Cazeaux	(Belgium) Catherine Chantraine (Spain) Arabela Fernández Rabener	(Morocco) Rita Atik (Romania) Irina Fetecău (United Kingdom) Manisha Foster (Spain) Olga Parres Azcoitia
November 10	Casablanca, Morocco; Clay $10,000; Singles and doubles draws	(Spain) Georgina García Pérez (Spain) Olga Parres Azcoitia; 6–2, 6–4	(Croatia) Tea Faber (Croatia) Silvia Njirić	(Belgium) Catherine Chantraine (Spain) Arabela Fernández Rabener	(Morocco) Rita Atik (Romania) Irina Fetecău (United Kingdom) Manisha Foster (Spain) Olga Parres Azcoitia
November 10	Castellón, Spain; Clay $10,000; Singles and doubles draws	(Spain) Olga Sáez Larra; 3–6, 6–1, 6–2	(United Kingdom) Amanda Carreras	(Italy) Martina Spigarelli (Venezuela) Andrea Gámiz	(Spain) Ariadna Martí Riembau (Spain) Alba Carrillo Marín (Australia) Alexandra Nancarrow (Norway) Melanie Stokke
November 10	Castellón, Spain; Clay $10,000; Singles and doubles draws	(Spain) Aliona Bolsova Zadoinov (Venezuela) Andrea Gámiz; 6–1, 6–2	(Italy) Federica Arcidiacono (Italy) Martina Spigarelli	(Italy) Martina Spigarelli (Venezuela) Andrea Gámiz	(Spain) Ariadna Martí Riembau (Spain) Alba Carrillo Marín (Australia) Alexandra Nancarrow (Norway) Melanie Stokke
November 10	Sousse, Tunisia; Hard $10,000; Singles and doubles draws	(Russia) Natela Dzalamidze; 7–6^{(9–7)}, 6–1	(France) Sherazad Reix	(Germany) Anna Klasen (Hungary) Szabina Szlavikovics	(Netherlands) Mandy Wagemaker (United Kingdom) Francesca Stephenson (Serbia) Barbara Bonić (Ukraine) Oleksandra Korashvili
November 10	Sousse, Tunisia; Hard $10,000; Singles and doubles draws	(Russia) Natela Dzalamidze (Ukraine) Oleksandra Korashvili; 6–3, 6–1	(United Kingdom) Harriet Dart (United Kingdom) Francesca Stephenson	(Germany) Anna Klasen (Hungary) Szabina Szlavikovics	(Netherlands) Mandy Wagemaker (United Kingdom) Francesca Stephenson (Serbia) Barbara Bonić (Ukraine) Oleksandra Korashvili
November 10	Antalya, Turkey; Clay $10,000; Singles and doubles draws	(Croatia) Nina Alibalić; 6–3, 6–0	(Slovakia) Kristína Schmiedlová	(Uzbekistan) Arina Folts (Austria) Anna Maria Heil	(Germany) Lisa Ponomar (Germany) Katharina Hering (Russia) Aminat Kushkhova (Czech Republic) Natálie Novotná
November 10	Antalya, Turkey; Clay $10,000; Singles and doubles draws	(Uzbekistan) Arina Folts (Italy) Valeria Prosperi; 3–6, 7–6^{(7–4)}, [10–5]	(Romania) Irina Maria Bara (Turkey) Melis Sezer	(Uzbekistan) Arina Folts (Austria) Anna Maria Heil	(Germany) Lisa Ponomar (Germany) Katharina Hering (Russia) Aminat Kushkhova (Czech Republic) Natálie Novotná
November 17	Dunlop World Challenge; Toyota, Japan; Carpet (indoor) $75,000+H; Singles – Doubles	(Belgium) An-Sophie Mestach; 6–1, 6–1	(Japan) Shuko Aoyama	(Thailand) Tamarine Tanasugarn (Japan) Kimiko Date-Krumm	(Thailand) Luksika Kumkhum (Japan) Misaki Doi (Japan) Miharu Imanishi (Japan) Mayo Hibi
November 17	Dunlop World Challenge; Toyota, Japan; Carpet (indoor) $75,000+H; Singles – Doubles	(Japan) Eri Hozumi (Japan) Makoto Ninomiya; 6–3, 7–5	(Japan) Shuko Aoyama (Japan) Junri Namigata	(Thailand) Tamarine Tanasugarn (Japan) Kimiko Date-Krumm	(Thailand) Luksika Kumkhum (Japan) Misaki Doi (Japan) Miharu Imanishi (Japan) Mayo Hibi
November 17	QNet Open; New Delhi, India; Hard $50,000; Singles – Doubles	(Serbia) Ivana Jorović; 6–2, 6–2	(Austria) Barbara Haas	(Belgium) Elise Mertens (Ukraine) Anastasiya Vasylyeva	(Austria) Patricia Mayr-Achleitner (Russia) Marina Melnikova (Thailand) Nicha Lertpitaksinchai (Uzbekistan) Sabina Sharipova
November 17	QNet Open; New Delhi, India; Hard $50,000; Singles – Doubles	(China) Liu Chang (China) Lu Jiajing; 6–3, 6–0	(Russia) Marina Melnikova (Belgium) Elise Mertens	(Belgium) Elise Mertens (Ukraine) Anastasiya Vasylyeva	(Austria) Patricia Mayr-Achleitner (Russia) Marina Melnikova (Thailand) Nicha Lertpitaksinchai (Uzbekistan) Sabina Sharipova
November 17	CIT Paraguay Open; Asunción, Paraguay; Clay $50,000; Singles – Doubles	(Peru) Bianca Botto; 6–3, 6–2	(Argentina) Florencia Molinero	(Russia) Anastasia Pivovarova (Paraguay) Montserrat González	(Brazil) Beatriz Haddad Maia (Dominican Republic) Francesca Segarelli (Brazil) Carolina Alves (Paraguay) Verónica Cepede Royg
November 17	CIT Paraguay Open; Asunción, Paraguay; Clay $50,000; Singles – Doubles	(Argentina) Sofía Luini (Argentina) Guadalupe Pérez Rojas; 6–3, 6–3	(Russia) Anastasia Pivovarova (Romania) Patricia Maria Țig	(Russia) Anastasia Pivovarova (Paraguay) Montserrat González	(Brazil) Beatriz Haddad Maia (Dominican Republic) Francesca Segarelli (Brazil) Carolina Alves (Paraguay) Verónica Cepede Royg
November 17	Zawada, Poland; Carpet (indoor) $25,000; Singles and doubles draws	(France) Océane Dodin; 7–5, 6–4	(Latvia) Jeļena Ostapenko	(Ukraine) Anhelina Kalinina (Bulgaria) Elitsa Kostova	(Croatia) Ana Vrljić (Netherlands) Indy de Vroome (Czech Republic) Petra Krejsová (Czech Republic) Karolína Muchová
November 17	Zawada, Poland; Carpet (indoor) $25,000; Singles and doubles draws	(Ukraine) Anhelina Kalinina (Ukraine) Anna Shkudun; 6–0, 7–6^{(7–3)}	(Czech Republic) Gabriela Chmelinová (Czech Republic) Karolína Muchová	(Ukraine) Anhelina Kalinina (Bulgaria) Elitsa Kostova	(Croatia) Ana Vrljić (Netherlands) Indy de Vroome (Czech Republic) Petra Krejsová (Czech Republic) Karolína Muchová
November 17	Sharm el-Sheikh, Egypt; Hard $10,000; Singles and doubles draws	(Serbia) Vojislava Lukić; 7–6^{(7–5)}, 6–7^{(3–7)}, 6–3	(Serbia) Nina Stojanović	(Russia) Anastasia Pribylova (Belgium) Marie Benoît	(Russia) Anna Morgina (United Kingdom) Laura Deigman (India) Snehadevi Reddy (Netherlands) Demi Schuurs
November 17	Sharm el-Sheikh, Egypt; Hard $10,000; Singles and doubles draws	(Russia) Anna Morgina (Serbia) Nina Stojanović; 5–7, 6–1, [10–3]	(Russia) Alina Mikheeva (Czech Republic) Martina Přádová	(Russia) Anastasia Pribylova (Belgium) Marie Benoît	(Russia) Anna Morgina (United Kingdom) Laura Deigman (India) Snehadevi Reddy (Netherlands) Demi Schuurs
November 17	Casablanca, Morocco; Clay $10,000; Singles and doubles draws	(Italy) Corinna Dentoni; 6–2, 7–5	(Austria) Pia König	(Spain) Olga Parres Azcoitia (Switzerland) Lisa Sabino	(United Kingdom) Manisha Foster (Spain) Arabela Fernández Rabener (United Kingdom) Mirabelle Njoze (Portugal) Inês Murta
November 17	Casablanca, Morocco; Clay $10,000; Singles and doubles draws	(Spain) Georgina García Pérez (Spain) Olga Parres Azcoitia; 1–6, 7–6^{(7–2)}, [10–7]	(United Kingdom) Manisha Foster (Switzerland) Lisa Sabino	(Spain) Olga Parres Azcoitia (Switzerland) Lisa Sabino	(United Kingdom) Manisha Foster (Spain) Arabela Fernández Rabener (United Kingdom) Mirabelle Njoze (Portugal) Inês Murta
November 17	Nules, Spain; Clay $10,000; Singles and doubles draws	(Spain) Olga Sáez Larra; 6–2, 6–4	(Spain) Yvonne Cavallé Reimers	(Germany) Justine Ozga (United Kingdom) Amanda Carreras	(Spain) Marta Sexmilo Pascual (Belgium) Justine De Sutter (Norway) Melanie Stokke (Australia) Alexandra Nancarrow
November 17	Nules, Spain; Clay $10,000; Singles and doubles draws	(Australia) Alexandra Nancarrow (Spain) Olga Sáez Larra; 7–6^{(7–5)}, 7–6^{(7–5)}	(Spain) Yvonne Cavallé Reimers (Spain) Aina Schaffner Riera	(Germany) Justine Ozga (United Kingdom) Amanda Carreras	(Spain) Marta Sexmilo Pascual (Belgium) Justine De Sutter (Norway) Melanie Stokke (Australia) Alexandra Nancarrow
November 17	Sousse, Tunisia; Hard $10,000; Singles and doubles draws	(Bulgaria) Viktoriya Tomova; 6–3, 6–2	(United States) Nicole Melichar	(Russia) Natela Dzalamidze (Ukraine) Oleksandra Korashvili	(Bosnia and Herzegovina) Dea Herdželaš (Serbia) Barbara Bonić (Russia) Natalia Orlova (Ecuador) Charlotte Römer
November 17	Sousse, Tunisia; Hard $10,000; Singles and doubles draws	(Russia) Natela Dzalamidze (Ukraine) Oleksandra Korashvili; 6–3, 6–1	(Bosnia and Herzegovina) Dea Herdželaš (Bosnia and Herzegovina) Jelena Simić	(Russia) Natela Dzalamidze (Ukraine) Oleksandra Korashvili	(Bosnia and Herzegovina) Dea Herdželaš (Serbia) Barbara Bonić (Russia) Natalia Orlova (Ecuador) Charlotte Römer
November 17	Antalya, Turkey; Clay $10,000; Singles and doubles draws	(Slovakia) Kristína Schmiedlová; 6–3, 6–2	(Romania) Irina Maria Bara	(Croatia) Nina Alibalić (Slovakia) Chantal Škamlová	(Georgia (country)) Ekaterine Gorgodze (Serbia) Natalija Kostić (Italy) Valeria Prosperi (Georgia (country)) Sofia Kvatsabaia
November 17	Antalya, Turkey; Clay $10,000; Singles and doubles draws	(Ukraine) Alona Fomina (Georgia (country)) Ekaterine Gorgodze; Walkover	(Serbia) Natalija Kostić (Slovakia) Chantal Škamlová	(Croatia) Nina Alibalić (Slovakia) Chantal Škamlová	(Georgia (country)) Ekaterine Gorgodze (Serbia) Natalija Kostić (Italy) Valeria Prosperi (Georgia (country)) Sofia Kvatsabaia
November 24	Bogotá, Colombia; Clay $10,000; Singles and doubles draws	(Argentina) Victoria Bosio; 7–6^{(7–3)}, 6–1	(Chile) Andrea Koch Benvenuto	(Colombia) Yuliana Monroy (United Kingdom) Anna Brogan	(Colombia) María Paulina Pérez (Colombia) Valerie Quiceno (Argentina) Carla Lucero (United States) Alexandra Morozova
November 24	Bogotá, Colombia; Clay $10,000; Singles and doubles draws	(United Kingdom) Anna Brogan (Colombia) María Fernanda Herazo; 5–7, 6–4, [10–7]	(Argentina) Victoria Bosio (United States) Daniella Roldan	(Colombia) Yuliana Monroy (United Kingdom) Anna Brogan	(Colombia) María Paulina Pérez (Colombia) Valerie Quiceno (Argentina) Carla Lucero (United States) Alexandra Morozova
November 24	Sharm el-Sheikh, Egypt; Hard $10,000; Singles and doubles draws	(Serbia) Nina Stojanović; 7–6^{(11–9)}, 6–3	(Russia) Anastasia Pribylova	(Serbia) Vojislava Lukić (Hungary) Naomi Totka	(United Kingdom) Naomi Cavaday (United States) Elizabeth Profit (Egypt) Ola Abou Zekry (Italy) Claudia Giovine
November 24	Sharm el-Sheikh, Egypt; Hard $10,000; Singles and doubles draws	(Russia) Anna Morgina (Russia) Anastasia Pribylova; 6–4, 6–4	(India) Snehadevi Reddy (India) Dhruthi Tatachar Venugopal	(Serbia) Vojislava Lukić (Hungary) Naomi Totka	(United Kingdom) Naomi Cavaday (United States) Elizabeth Profit (Egypt) Ola Abou Zekry (Italy) Claudia Giovine
November 24	Astana, Kazakhstan; Hard (indoor) $10,000; Singles and doubles draws	(Russia) Ekaterina Yashina; 6–3, 6–4	(Kazakhstan) Kamila Kerimbayeva	(Russia) Anastasia Rudakova (Russia) Yulia Bryzgalova	(Belarus) Sadafmoh Tolibova (Russia) Polina Novoselova (Uzbekistan) Albina Khabibulina (Russia) Margarita Lazareva
November 24	Astana, Kazakhstan; Hard (indoor) $10,000; Singles and doubles draws	(Uzbekistan) Albina Khabibulina (Uzbekistan) Polina Merenkova; 6–2, 6–2	(Kazakhstan) Kamila Kerimbayeva (Russia) Ekaterina Yashina	(Russia) Anastasia Rudakova (Russia) Yulia Bryzgalova	(Belarus) Sadafmoh Tolibova (Russia) Polina Novoselova (Uzbekistan) Albina Khabibulina (Russia) Margarita Lazareva
November 24	Sousse, Tunisia; Hard $10,000; Singles and doubles draws	(Ukraine) Oleksandra Korashvili; 6–3, 6–2	(France) Manon Arcangioli	(Italy) Martina Caregaro (Belgium) Sofie Oyen	(Bosnia and Herzegovina) Anita Husarić (Belgium) Klaartje Liebens (Serbia) Barbara Bonić (France) Carla Touly
November 24	Sousse, Tunisia; Hard $10,000; Singles and doubles draws	(Italy) Alice Balducci (Italy) Martina Caregaro; 7–6^{(7–2)}, 6–4	(Serbia) Barbara Bonić (Ukraine) Oleksandra Korashvili	(Italy) Martina Caregaro (Belgium) Sofie Oyen	(Bosnia and Herzegovina) Anita Husarić (Belgium) Klaartje Liebens (Serbia) Barbara Bonić (France) Carla Touly
November 24	Antalya, Turkey; Clay $10,000; Singles and doubles draws	(Hungary) Réka-Luca Jani; 6–4, 6–0	(Georgia (country)) Ekaterine Gorgodze	(Netherlands) Janneke Wikkerink (Romania) Diana Buzean	(Germany) Sina Haas (Germany) Katharina Hering (North Macedonia) Lina Gjorcheska (Slovakia) Chantal Škamlová
November 24	Antalya, Turkey; Clay $10,000; Singles and doubles draws	(Georgia (country)) Ekaterine Gorgodze (Georgia (country)) Sofia Kvatsabaia; 7–6^{(7–3)}, 7–6^{(9–7)}	(Hungary) Réka-Luca Jani (Bulgaria) Julia Stamatova	(Netherlands) Janneke Wikkerink (Romania) Diana Buzean	(Germany) Sina Haas (Germany) Katharina Hering (North Macedonia) Lina Gjorcheska (Slovakia) Chantal Škamlová

=== December ===
Week of	Tournament	Winner	Runners-up	Semifinalists	Quarterfinalists
December 1	Santiago, Chile; Clay $25,000; Singles and doubles draws	(Peru) Bianca Botto; 3–6, 7–5, 6–1	(Argentina) Florencia Molinero	(United States) Lauren Albanese (Argentina) Vanesa Furlanetto	(Slovenia) Dalila Jakupović (Argentina) Catalina Pella (Italy) Gaia Sanesi (United States) Alexa Guarachi
December 1	Santiago, Chile; Clay $25,000; Singles and doubles draws	(United States) Lauren Albanese (United States) Alexa Guarachi; 6–4, 6–1	(Chile) Fernanda Brito (Brazil) Eduarda Piai	(United States) Lauren Albanese (Argentina) Vanesa Furlanetto	(Slovenia) Dalila Jakupović (Argentina) Catalina Pella (Italy) Gaia Sanesi (United States) Alexa Guarachi
December 1	Mérida, Mexico; Hard $25,000+H; Singles and doubles draws	(Romania) Patricia Maria Țig; 3–6, 6–3, 6–1	(Brazil) Beatriz Haddad Maia	(United States) Jennifer Brady (Mexico) Marcela Zacarías	(Greece) Maria Sakkari (Mexico) Renata Zarazúa (Slovenia) Petra Rampre (Croatia) Tereza Mrdeža
December 1	Mérida, Mexico; Hard $25,000+H; Singles and doubles draws	(Germany) Tatjana Maria (Mexico) Renata Zarazúa; 7–6^{(7–1)}, 6–1	(United States) Jan Abaza (Chinese Taipei) Hsu Chieh-yu	(United States) Jennifer Brady (Mexico) Marcela Zacarías	(Greece) Maria Sakkari (Mexico) Renata Zarazúa (Slovenia) Petra Rampre (Croatia) Tereza Mrdeža
December 1	Bogotá, Colombia; Hard $10,000; Singles and doubles draws	(Argentina) Victoria Bosio; 1–6, 6–0, 6–1	(United Kingdom) Anna Brogan	(Argentina) Melina Ferrero (Argentina) Carla Lucero	(Colombia) Yuliana Monroy (Netherlands) Anna Katalina Alzate Esmurzaeva (Colombia) María Paulina Pérez (France) Brandy Mina
December 1	Bogotá, Colombia; Hard $10,000; Singles and doubles draws	(Argentina) Melina Ferrero (Argentina) Carla Lucero; 6–4, 3–6, [12–10]	(Argentina) Victoria Bosio (United States) Daniella Roldan	(Argentina) Melina Ferrero (Argentina) Carla Lucero	(Colombia) Yuliana Monroy (Netherlands) Anna Katalina Alzate Esmurzaeva (Colombia) María Paulina Pérez (France) Brandy Mina
December 1	Djibouti, Djibouti; Hard $10,000; Singles and doubles draws	(United Kingdom) Harriet Dart; 6–3, 6–2	(Hungary) Naomi Totka	(China) Wang Xiyao (Belgium) Magali Kempen	(Croatia) Mariana Dražić (United Kingdom) Laura Deigman (United States) Alexandra Riley (Germany) Jasmin Jebawy
December 1	Djibouti, Djibouti; Hard $10,000; Singles and doubles draws	(Belgium) Magali Kempen (United Kingdom) Francesca Stephenson; 7–6^{(9–7)}, 6–3	(United Kingdom) Laura Deigman (Hungary) Naomi Totka	(China) Wang Xiyao (Belgium) Magali Kempen	(Croatia) Mariana Dražić (United Kingdom) Laura Deigman (United States) Alexandra Riley (Germany) Jasmin Jebawy
December 1	Sharm el-Sheikh, Egypt; Hard $10,000; Singles and doubles draws	(Russia) Anastasia Pribylova; 7–5, 6–2	(Czech Republic) Simona Heinová	(Belgium) Klaartje Liebens (India) Snehadevi Reddy	(United Kingdom) Naomi Cavaday (Ukraine) Katya Malikova (United States) Elizabeth Profit (Switzerland) Nina Stadler
December 1	Sharm el-Sheikh, Egypt; Hard $10,000; Singles and doubles draws	(Czech Republic) Nikola Fraňková (Italy) Claudia Giovine; 7–6^{(7–1)}, 4–6, [10–6]	(Russia) Anna Morgina (Russia) Anastasia Pribylova	(Belgium) Klaartje Liebens (India) Snehadevi Reddy	(United Kingdom) Naomi Cavaday (Ukraine) Katya Malikova (United States) Elizabeth Profit (Switzerland) Nina Stadler
December 1	Tel Aviv, Israel; Hard $10,000; Singles and doubles draws	(Czech Republic) Barbora Štefková; 6–2, 6–0	(Israel) Deniz Khazaniuk	(Israel) Ofri Lankri (Russia) Marta Paigina	(Israel) Keren Shlomo (Israel) Saray Sterenbach (Russia) Daria Lodikova (Hungary) Anna Bondár
December 1	Tel Aviv, Israel; Hard $10,000; Singles and doubles draws	(Hungary) Anna Bondár (Romania) Ilka Csöregi; 6–1, 6–3	(Ukraine) Anna Bogoslavets (Israel) Ester Masuri	(Israel) Ofri Lankri (Russia) Marta Paigina	(Israel) Keren Shlomo (Israel) Saray Sterenbach (Russia) Daria Lodikova (Hungary) Anna Bondár
December 1	Sousse, Tunisia; Hard $10,000; Singles and doubles draws	(Bosnia and Herzegovina) Dea Herdželaš; 6–7^{(4–7)}, 6–2, 6–1	(Italy) Martina Caregaro	(Italy) Gioia Barbieri (Bosnia and Herzegovina) Anita Husarić	(Czech Republic) Tereza Malíková (Romania) Elena-Teodora Cadar (United Kingdom) Katie Boulter (Spain) Nuria Párrizas Díaz
December 1	Sousse, Tunisia; Hard $10,000; Singles and doubles draws	(Netherlands) Demi Schuurs (Netherlands) Kelly Versteeg; 6–3, 6–0	(Slovakia) Vivien Juhászová (Czech Republic) Tereza Malíková	(Italy) Gioia Barbieri (Bosnia and Herzegovina) Anita Husarić	(Czech Republic) Tereza Malíková (Romania) Elena-Teodora Cadar (United Kingdom) Katie Boulter (Spain) Nuria Párrizas Díaz
December 1	Antalya, Turkey; Clay $10,000; Singles and doubles draws	(Austria) Pia König; 7–5, 6–4	(North Macedonia) Lina Gjorcheska	(Slovenia) Nastja Kolar (Belgium) Elyne Boeykens	(United Kingdom) Amanda Carreras (Germany) Sina Haas (Croatia) Iva Primorac (Georgia (country)) Sofia Kvatsabaia
December 1	Antalya, Turkey; Clay $10,000; Singles and doubles draws	(Georgia (country)) Sofia Kvatsabaia (Slovakia) Chantal Škamlová; Walkover	(Georgia (country)) Ekaterine Gorgodze (Slovenia) Nastja Kolar	(Slovenia) Nastja Kolar (Belgium) Elyne Boeykens	(United Kingdom) Amanda Carreras (Germany) Sina Haas (Croatia) Iva Primorac (Georgia (country)) Sofia Kvatsabaia
December 8	Mérida, Mexico; Hard $25,000+H; Singles and doubles draws	(Germany) Tatjana Maria; 6–0, 6–3	(Mexico) Victoria Rodríguez	(Russia) Natalia Vikhlyantseva (Brazil) Beatriz Haddad Maia	(Latvia) Diāna Marcinkēviča (Russia) Valeria Savinykh (Croatia) Tereza Mrdeža (United States) Jennifer Brady
December 8	Mérida, Mexico; Hard $25,000+H; Singles and doubles draws	(Germany) Tatjana Maria (Mexico) Renata Zarazúa; 6–4, 6–1	(Venezuela) Andrea Gámiz (Russia) Valeria Savinykh	(Russia) Natalia Vikhlyantseva (Brazil) Beatriz Haddad Maia	(Latvia) Diāna Marcinkēviča (Russia) Valeria Savinykh (Croatia) Tereza Mrdeža (United States) Jennifer Brady
December 8	Lucknow, India; Grass $15,000; Singles and doubles draws	(Georgia (country)) Sofia Shapatava; 6–3, 6–2	(Russia) Anastasiya Komardina	(United Kingdom) Emily Webley-Smith (India) Ankita Raina	(India) Bhuvana Kalva (India) Natasha Palha (Russia) Margarita Lazareva (Sweden) Ellen Allgurin
December 8	Lucknow, India; Grass $15,000; Singles and doubles draws	(India) Ankita Raina (United Kingdom) Emily Webley-Smith; 6–2, 6–4	(India) Rushmi Chakravarthi (India) Nidhi Chilumula	(United Kingdom) Emily Webley-Smith (India) Ankita Raina	(India) Bhuvana Kalva (India) Natasha Palha (Russia) Margarita Lazareva (Sweden) Ellen Allgurin
December 8	Djibouti, Djibouti; Hard $10,000; Singles and doubles draws	(United Kingdom) Francesca Stephenson; 6–7^{(5–7)}, 6–2, 6–4	(Germany) Jasmin Jebawy	(United Kingdom) Harriet Dart (Hungary) Naomi Totka	(Russia) Nika Kukharchuk (Croatia) Mariana Dražić (China) Wang Xiyao (India) Eetee Maheta
December 8	Djibouti, Djibouti; Hard $10,000; Singles and doubles draws	(France) Tessah Andrianjafitrimo (India) Ashmitha Easwaramurthi; 3–6, 6–1, [10–8]	(Belgium) Magali Kempen (China) Wang Xiyao	(United Kingdom) Harriet Dart (Hungary) Naomi Totka	(Russia) Nika Kukharchuk (Croatia) Mariana Dražić (China) Wang Xiyao (India) Eetee Maheta
December 8	Sharm el-Sheikh, Egypt; Hard $10,000; Singles and doubles draws	(Belgium) Klaartje Liebens; 6–7^{(3–7)}, 6–2, 6–4	(Serbia) Vojislava Lukić	(Hungary) Ágnes Bukta (United Kingdom) Naomi Cavaday	(Russia) Anastasia Pribylova (India) Dhruthi Tatachar Venugopal (Germany) Julia Wachaczyk (Czech Republic) Simona Heinová
December 8	Sharm el-Sheikh, Egypt; Hard $10,000; Singles and doubles draws	(Netherlands) Rosalie van der Hoek (United Kingdom) Eden Silva; 6–4, 2–6, [10–5]	(Kazakhstan) Alexandra Grinchishina (Kazakhstan) Ekaterina Klyueva	(Hungary) Ágnes Bukta (United Kingdom) Naomi Cavaday	(Russia) Anastasia Pribylova (India) Dhruthi Tatachar Venugopal (Germany) Julia Wachaczyk (Czech Republic) Simona Heinová
December 8	Tel Aviv, Israel; Hard $10,000; Singles and doubles draws	(Russia) Marta Paigina; 6–1, 2–6, 7–6^{(7–3)}	(Ukraine) Olga Fridman	(Israel) Deniz Khazaniuk (Hungary) Anna Bondár	(Israel) Keren Shlomo (Latvia) Laura Gulbe (Ukraine) Anna Bogoslavets (France) Clothilde de Bernardi
December 8	Tel Aviv, Israel; Hard $10,000; Singles and doubles draws	(Moldova) Julia Helbet (Russia) Marta Paigina; 6–4, 6–2	(Israel) Valeria Patiuk (Israel) Keren Shlomo	(Israel) Deniz Khazaniuk (Hungary) Anna Bondár	(Israel) Keren Shlomo (Latvia) Laura Gulbe (Ukraine) Anna Bogoslavets (France) Clothilde de Bernardi
December 8	Sousse, Tunisia; Hard $10,000; Singles and doubles draws	(Italy) Martina Caregaro; 6–4, 6–0	(Czech Republic) Tereza Malíková	(Italy) Gioia Barbieri (Switzerland) Sara Ottomano	(France) Estelle Cascino (Netherlands) Demi Schuurs (Serbia) Vanja Klarić (Netherlands) Kelly Versteeg
December 8	Sousse, Tunisia; Hard $10,000; Singles and doubles draws	Doubles competition not completed due to bad weather.		(Italy) Gioia Barbieri (Switzerland) Sara Ottomano	(France) Estelle Cascino (Netherlands) Demi Schuurs (Serbia) Vanja Klarić (Netherlands) Kelly Versteeg
December 8	Antalya, Turkey; Clay $10,000; Singles and doubles draws	(Norway) Melanie Stokke; 7–5, 6–4	(Slovakia) Chantal Škamlová	(North Macedonia) Lina Gjorcheska (Germany) Sina Haas	(Hungary) Szabina Szlavikovics (Belgium) Elyne Boeykens (Romania) Irina Maria Bara (Netherlands) Elke Tiel
December 8	Antalya, Turkey; Clay $10,000; Singles and doubles draws	(Romania) Irina Maria Bara (Romania) Diana Buzean; 6–2, 6–4	(North Macedonia) Magdalena Stoilkovska (Netherlands) Elke Tiel	(North Macedonia) Lina Gjorcheska (Germany) Sina Haas	(Hungary) Szabina Szlavikovics (Belgium) Elyne Boeykens (Romania) Irina Maria Bara (Netherlands) Elke Tiel
December 15	Ankara Cup; Ankara, Turkey; Hard (indoor) $50,000; Singles – Doubles	(Serbia) Aleksandra Krunić; 3–6, 6–2, 7–6^{(8–6)}	(Uzbekistan) Akgul Amanmuradova	(Russia) Valentyna Ivakhnenko (Ukraine) Yuliya Beygelzimer	(Italy) Gioia Barbieri (France) Julie Coin (Turkey) Çağla Büyükakçay (Belgium) Ysaline Bonaventure
December 15	Ankara Cup; Ankara, Turkey; Hard (indoor) $50,000; Singles – Doubles	(Georgia (country)) Ekaterine Gorgodze (Slovenia) Nastja Kolar; 6–4, 7–6^{(7–5)}	(Ukraine) Oleksandra Korashvili (Bulgaria) Elitsa Kostova	(Russia) Valentyna Ivakhnenko (Ukraine) Yuliya Beygelzimer	(Italy) Gioia Barbieri (France) Julie Coin (Turkey) Çağla Büyükakçay (Belgium) Ysaline Bonaventure
December 15	Navi Mumbai, India; Hard $25,000; Singles and doubles draws	(Serbia) Nina Stojanović; 3–6, 6–1, 6–4	(Russia) Natela Dzalamidze	(Netherlands) Cindy Burger (France) Chloé Paquet	(Ukraine) Veronika Kapshay (China) Lu Jiajing (India) Sharmada Balu (United Kingdom) Emily Webley-Smith
December 15	Navi Mumbai, India; Hard $25,000; Singles and doubles draws	(Greece) Despina Papamichail (Serbia) Nina Stojanović; 7–6^{(7–5)}, 6–2	(Japan) Miyabi Inoue (Japan) Miki Miyamura	(Netherlands) Cindy Burger (France) Chloé Paquet	(Ukraine) Veronika Kapshay (China) Lu Jiajing (India) Sharmada Balu (United Kingdom) Emily Webley-Smith
December 15	Hong Kong; Hard $10,000; Singles and doubles draws	(China) Liang Chen; 6–3, 7–5	(China) Sun Xuliu	(Japan) Yuka Higuchi (China) Ye Qiuyu	(China) Gao Xinyu (South Korea) Kim Na-ri (Japan) Chihiro Takayama (China) You Xiaodi
December 15	Hong Kong; Hard $10,000; Singles and doubles draws	(South Korea) Choi Ji-hee (South Korea) Kim Na-ri; 6–3, 6–2	(Japan) Nozomi Fujioka (Japan) Mami Hasegawa	(Japan) Yuka Higuchi (China) Ye Qiuyu	(China) Gao Xinyu (South Korea) Kim Na-ri (Japan) Chihiro Takayama (China) You Xiaodi
December 22	Pune, India; Hard $25,000; Singles and doubles draws	(India) Ankita Raina; 6–2, 6–2	(United Kingdom) Katy Dunne	(Georgia (country)) Sofia Shapatava (Romania) Cristina Ene	(Ukraine) Anastasiya Vasylyeva (Poland) Magdalena Fręch (Serbia) Nina Stojanović (Sweden) Ellen Allgurin
December 22	Pune, India; Hard $25,000; Singles and doubles draws	(Russia) Anna Morgina (Serbia) Nina Stojanović; 7–6^{(9–7)}, 6–4	(Georgia (country)) Oksana Kalashnikova (Ukraine) Anastasiya Vasylyeva	(Georgia (country)) Sofia Shapatava (Romania) Cristina Ene	(Ukraine) Anastasiya Vasylyeva (Poland) Magdalena Fręch (Serbia) Nina Stojanović (Sweden) Ellen Allgurin
December 22	Hong Kong; Hard $10,000; Singles and doubles draws	(China) Yang Zhaoxuan; 6–4, 6–4	(China) Zhu Lin	(China) Zhang Yuxuan (China) Yan Wang	(China) Xun Fangying (South Korea) Choi Ji-hee (China) Gao Xinyu (South Korea) Kim Na-ri
December 22	Hong Kong; Hard $10,000; Singles and doubles draws	(China) Yang Zhaoxuan (China) Ye Qiuyu; 6–4, 6–3	(South Korea) Hong Seung-yeon (South Korea) Kang Seo-kyung	(China) Zhang Yuxuan (China) Yan Wang	(China) Xun Fangying (South Korea) Choi Ji-hee (China) Gao Xinyu (South Korea) Kim Na-ri
December 22	Istanbul, Turkey; Hard (indoor) $10,000; Singles and doubles draws	(Croatia) Jana Fett; 6–2, 6–4	(Ukraine) Olga Ianchuk	(Croatia) Adrijana Lekaj (Bulgaria) Dia Evtimova	(Uzbekistan) Sabina Sharipova (Turkey) İpek Soylu (France) Lou Brouleau (Romania) Nicoleta-Cătălina Dascălu
December 22	Istanbul, Turkey; Hard (indoor) $10,000; Singles and doubles draws	(Croatia) Jana Fett (Croatia) Adrijana Lekaj; 6–3, 6–4	(Turkey) Ayla Aksu (Turkey) İpek Soylu	(Croatia) Adrijana Lekaj (Bulgaria) Dia Evtimova	(Uzbekistan) Sabina Sharipova (Turkey) İpek Soylu (France) Lou Brouleau (Romania) Nicoleta-Cătălina Dascălu
