= 2015 Internacional Femenil Monterrey =

- Date: 21–27 September
- Edition: 3rd
- Category: ITF Women's Circuit
- Prize money: $50,000
- Surface: Hard
- Location: Monterrey, Mexico

Champions

Singles
- (Belgium) Ysaline Bonaventure

Doubles
- (Belgium) Ysaline Bonaventure / (Belgium) Elise Mertens
← 2014 ·	Internacional Femenil Monterrey	· 2016 →

The 2015 Internacional Femenil Monterrey was a professional tennis tournament played on outdoor hard courts. It was the third edition of the tournament and part of the 2015 ITF Women's Circuit, offering a total of $50,000 in prize money. It took place in Monterrey, Mexico, on 21–27 September 2015.

== Singles main draw entrants ==
=== Seeds ===
Country	Player	Rank^{1}	Seed
SUI	Romina Oprandi	115	1
BEL	Ysaline Bonaventure	167	2
CRO	Tereza Mrdeža	168	3
TUR	İpek Soylu	171	4
RUS	Marina Melnikova	180	5
GRE	Maria Sakkari	185	6
ARG	María Irigoyen	186	7
BEL	Elise Mertens	194	8

- ^{1} Rankings as of 14 September 2015

=== Other entrants ===
The following players received wildcards into the singles main draw:

- (Mexico) Carolina Betancourt
- (Mexico) Giuliana Olmos
- (Mexico) Ana Sofía Sánchez
- (Mexico) Nazari Urbina

The following players received entry from the qualifying draw:

- (United States) Kristie Ahn
- (Italy) Cristiana Ferrando
- (Paraguay) Montserrat González
- (Argentina) Nadia Podoroska

The following player received entry by a lucky loser spot:

- (Italy) Martina Caregaro

== Champions ==
=== Singles ===
- (Belgium) Ysaline Bonaventure def. (Paraguay) Montserrat González, 6–1, 6–2

=== Doubles ===
- (Belgium) Ysaline Bonaventure / (Belgium) Elise Mertens def. (Russia) Marina Melnikova / (Luxembourg) Mandy Minella, 6–4, 3–6, [11–9]
