= 2014 Internacional Femenil Monterrey =

- Date: 6–12 October
- Edition: 2nd
- Category: ITF Women's Circuit
- Prize money: $50,000
- Surface: Hard
- Location: Monterrey, Mexico

Champions

Singles
- (Belgium) An-Sophie Mestach

Doubles
- (Spain) Lourdes Domínguez Lino / (Colombia) Mariana Duque
← 2013 ·	Internacional Femenil Monterrey	· 2015 →

The 2014 Internacional Femenil Monterrey was a professional tennis tournament played on outdoor hard courts. It was the second edition of the tournament which was part of the 2014 ITF Women's Circuit, offering a total of $50,000 in prize money. It took place in Monterrey, Mexico, on 6–12 October 2014.

== Singles main draw entrants ==
=== Seeds ===
Country	Player	Rank^{1}	Seed
USA	Irina Falconi	122	1
ESP	Lourdes Domínguez Lino	125	2
BEL	An-Sophie Mestach	151	3
COL	Mariana Duque	160	4
ARG	María Irigoyen	163	5
ISR	Julia Glushko	169	6
NED	Arantxa Rus	179	7
ROU	Alexandra Cadanțu	198	8

- ^{1} Rankings as of 29 September 2014

=== Other entrants ===
The following players received wildcards into the singles main draw:

- (Mexico) Carolina Betancourt
- (Mexico) Ximena Hermoso
- (Mexico) Victoria Rodríguez
- (Mexico) Marcela Zacarías

The following players received entry from the qualifying draw:

- (Hungary) Melinda Czink
- (Argentina) Vanesa Furlanetto
- (Russia) Valeria Savinykh
- (Romania) Patricia Maria Țig

== Champions ==
=== Singles ===
- (Belgium) An-Sophie Mestach def. (Spain) Lourdes Domínguez Lino, 6–3, 7–5

=== Doubles ===
- (Spain) Lourdes Domínguez Lino / (Colombia) Mariana Duque def. (Belgium) Elise Mertens / (Netherlands) Arantxa Rus, 6–3, 7–6^{(7–4)}
