= 2015 Internacional Femenil Monterrey – Singles =

Singles
- 2015 Internacional Femenil Monterrey

Final
- Champion: (Belgium) Ysaline Bonaventure
- Runner-up: (Paraguay) Montserrat González
- Score: 6–1, 6–2

Events
Singles	Doubles
← 2014 ·	Internacional Femenil Monterrey	· 2016 →

An-Sophie Mestach was the defending champion, but she chose to compete in Albuquerque instead.

The second seed Ysaline Bonaventure won the title, defeating qualifier Montserrat González in the final, 6–1, 6–2.

== Seeds ==
1. (Switzerland) Romina Oprandi (second round)
2. (Belgium) Ysaline Bonaventure (champion)
3. (Croatia) Tereza Mrdeža (first round)
4. (Turkey) İpek Soylu (quarterfinals)
5. (Russia) Marina Melnikova (quarterfinals)
6. (Greece) Maria Sakkari (second round; withdrew)
7. (Argentina) María Irigoyen (second round)
8. (Belgium) Elise Mertens (second round)

== Main draw ==
=== Key ===
- Q = Qualifier
- WC = Wild card
- LL = Lucky loser
- Alt = Alternate
- SE = Special exempt
- PR = Protected ranking
- ITF = ITF entry
- JE = Junior exempt
- w/o = Walkover
- r = Retired
- d = Defaulted
- SR = Special ranking

=== Finals ===
Semifinals
Q	(Paraguay) Montserrat González	6	6
(Mexico) Marcela Zacarías	2	1
(Croatia) Ana Vrljić	7^{7}	2	0
2	(Belgium) Ysaline Bonaventure	6^{4}	6	6

Final
Q	(Paraguay) Montserrat González	1	2
2	(Belgium) Ysaline Bonaventure	6	6

=== Top half ===
First round
1	(Switzerland) R Oprandi	7^{7}	6
(Luxembourg) M Minella	6^{4}	4
WC	(Mexico) C Betancourt	2	4
Q	(Paraguay) M González	6	6
WC	(Mexico) AS Sánchez	7^{8}	6
(France) A Hesse	6^{6}	4
LL	(Italy) M Caregaro	3	5
7	(Argentina) M Irigoyen	6	7
4	(Turkey) İ Soylu	6	6
(Brazil) G Cé	2	4
(Turkey) P Özgen	3	2
(Switzerland) C Perrin	6	6
(Mexico) M Zacarías	4	7^{8}	6
Q	(United States) K Ahn	6	6^{6}	0
(Netherlands) I de Vroome	4	6	3
6	(Greece) M Sakkari	6	4	6

Second round
1	(Switzerland) R Oprandi	6^{5}	6	0
Q	(Paraguay) M González	7^{7}	3	6
WC	(Mexico) AS Sánchez	6	3	6
7	(Argentina) M Irigoyen	2	6	3
4	(Turkey) İ Soylu	6	4
(Switzerland) C Perrin	1	0^{r}
(Mexico) M Zacarías	w/o
6	(Greece) M Sakkari

Quarterfinals
Q	(Paraguay) M González	6	6
WC	(Mexico) AS Sánchez	3	4
4	(Turkey) İ Soylu	7^{7}	1	4
(Mexico) M Zacarías	6^{3}	6	6

Semifinals
Q	(Paraguay) M González	6	6
(Mexico) M Zacarías	2	1

=== Bottom half ===
First round
8	(Belgium) E Mertens	3	6	6
WC	(Mexico) G Olmos	6	2	2
(United States) G Min	3	3
(Croatia) A Vrljić	6	6
(Czech Republic) B Štefková	6	6
(Australia) O Rogowska	2	3
Q	(Italy) C Ferrando	6	3	6
3	(Croatia) T Mrdeža	4	6	3
5	(Russia) M Melnikova	6	2	6
(Argentina) P Ormaechea	1	6	3
WC	(Mexico) N Urbina	6^{6}	4
(Bulgaria) A Naydenova	7^{8}	6
(Mexico) V Rodríguez	6	4	6
Q	(Argentina) N Podoroska	2	6	1
(Slovenia) D Jakupović	3	4
2	(Belgium) Y Bonaventure	6	6

Second round
8	(Belgium) E Mertens	3	2
(Croatia) A Vrljić	6	6
(Czech Republic) B Štefková	6	3	3
Q	(Italy) C Ferrando	4	6	6
5	(Russia) M Melnikova	6	6
(Bulgaria) A Naydenova	3	2
(Mexico) V Rodríguez	3	4
2	(Belgium) Y Bonaventure	6	6

Quarterfinals
(Croatia) A Vrljić	7^{7}	6
Q	(Italy) C Ferrando	6^{5}	2
5	(Russia) M Melnikova	6	0	4
2	(Belgium) Y Bonaventure	3	6	6

Semifinals
(Croatia) A Vrljić	7^{7}	2	0
2	(Belgium) Y Bonaventure	6^{4}	6	6
