= 2015 Internacional Femenil Monterrey – Doubles =

Doubles
- 2015 Internacional Femenil Monterrey

Final
- Champions: (Belgium) Ysaline Bonaventure (Belgium) Elise Mertens
- Runners-up: (Russia) Marina Melnikova (Luxembourg) Mandy Minella
- Score: 6–4, 3–6, [11–9]

Events
Singles	Doubles
← 2014 ·	Internacional Femenil Monterrey	· 2016 →

Lourdes Domínguez Lino and Mariana Duque were the defending champions, but chose not to participate.

Belgian-duo Ysaline Bonaventure and Elise Mertens won the title, defeating Marina Melnikova and Mandy Minella in the final, 6–4, 3–6, [11–9].

== Seeds ==
1. (Belgium) Ysaline Bonaventure / (Belgium) Elise Mertens (champions)
2. (Russia) Marina Melnikova / (Luxembourg) Mandy Minella (final)
3. (France) Amandine Hesse / (Croatia) Ana Vrljić (semifinals)
4. (Chile) Alexa Guarachi / (Chinese Taipei) Hsu Chieh-yu (first round)

== Draw ==
=== Key ===
- Q = Qualifier
- WC = Wild card
- LL = Lucky loser
- Alt = Alternate
- SE = Special exempt
- PR = Protected ranking
- ITF = ITF entry
- JE = Junior exempt
- w/o = Walkover
- r = Retired
- d = Defaulted
- SR = Special ranking

First round
1	(Belgium) Y Bonaventure (Belgium) E Mertens	6	6
(Australia) O Rogowska (Czech Republic) B Štefková	4	0
(Argentina) M Irigoyen (Slovenia) D Jakupović	7^{7}	6
(United Kingdom) T Moore (Switzerland) C Perrin	6^{2}	3
4	(Chile) A Guarachi (Chinese Taipei) C-y Hsu	4	7^{7}	[6]
(Turkey) P Özgen (Turkey) İ Soylu	6	6^{5}	[10]
(Slovenia) T Majerič (Bulgaria) A Naydenova	6	6
(Brazil) G Cé (Argentina) P Ormaechea	3	1
Alt	(Italy) G Brescia (Italy) M Caregaro	6	6
WC	(Mexico) C Betancourt (Mexico) X Hermoso	4	2
WC	(Mexico) K de la Garza Valdez (Mexico) SD Monarrez Yesaki	1	2
3	(France) A Hesse (Croatia) A Vrljić	6	6
(Paraguay) M González (Mexico) AS Sánchez	3	6^{4}
(Mexico) V Rodríguez (Mexico) M Zacarías	6	7^{7}
WC	(Mexico) C Gorches (Mexico) N Urbina	4	0
2	(Russia) M Melnikova (Luxembourg) M Minella	6	6

Quarterfinals
1	(Belgium) Y Bonaventure (Belgium) E Mertens	7^{7}	6
(Argentina) M Irigoyen (Slovenia) D Jakupović	6^{2}	4
(Turkey) P Özgen (Turkey) İ Soylu	6	6
(Slovenia) T Majerič (Bulgaria) A Naydenova	2	1
Alt	(Italy) G Brescia (Italy) M Caregaro	2	1
3	(France) A Hesse (Croatia) A Vrljić	6	6
(Mexico) V Rodríguez (Mexico) M Zacarías	4	4
2	(Russia) M Melnikova (Luxembourg) M Minella	6	6

Semifinals
1	(Belgium) Y Bonaventure (Belgium) E Mertens	7^{7}	5	[10]
(Turkey) P Özgen (Turkey) İ Soylu	6^{5}	7	[6]
3	(France) A Hesse (Croatia) A Vrljić	4	0
2	(Russia) M Melnikova (Luxembourg) M Minella	6	6

Final
1	(Belgium) Y Bonaventure (Belgium) E Mertens	6	3	[11]
2	(Russia) M Melnikova (Luxembourg) M Minella	4	6	[9]
