= 2014 Internacional Femenil Monterrey – Singles =

Singles
- 2014 Internacional Femenil Monterrey

Final
- Champion: (Belgium) An-Sophie Mestach
- Runner-up: (Spain) Lourdes Domínguez Lino
- Score: 6–3, 7–5

Events
Singles	Doubles
← 2013 ·	Internacional Femenil Monterrey	· 2015 →

Adriana Pérez was the defending champion, having won the event in 2013, but chose not to participate.

An-Sophie Mestach won the title, defeating Lourdes Domínguez Lino in the final, 6–3, 7–5.

== Seeds ==
1. (United States) Irina Falconi (quarterfinals)
2. (Spain) Lourdes Domínguez Lino (final)
3. (Belgium) An-Sophie Mestach (champion)
4. (Colombia) Mariana Duque (quarterfinals)
5. (Argentina) María Irigoyen (first round)
6. (Israel) Julia Glushko (semifinals)
7. (Netherlands) Arantxa Rus (second round)
8. (Romania) Alexandra Cadanțu (quarterfinals)

== Main draw ==
=== Key ===
- Q = Qualifier
- WC = Wild card
- LL = Lucky loser
- Alt = Alternate
- SE = Special exempt
- PR = Protected ranking
- ITF = ITF entry
- JE = Junior exempt
- w/o = Walkover
- r = Retired
- d = Defaulted
- SR = Special ranking

=== Finals ===
Semifinals
6	(Israel) Julia Glushko	4	5
3	(Belgium) An-Sophie Mestach	6	7
Q	(Romania) Patricia Maria Țig	4	6	4
2	(Spain) Lourdes Domínguez Lino	6	4	6

Final
3	(Belgium) An-Sophie Mestach	6	7
2	(Spain) Lourdes Domínguez Lino	3	5

=== Top half ===
First round
1	(United States) I Falconi	6	6
(Turkey) P Özgen	4	1
Q	(Russia) V Savinykh	3	7^{7}	6
(Croatia) A Vrljić	6	6^{3}	2
WC	(Mexico) C Betancourt	0	1
Q	(Hungary) M Czink	6	6
(Paraguay) M González	3	4
6	(Israel) J Glushko	6	6
3	(Belgium) A-S Mestach	6	6
Q	(Argentina) V Furlanetto	1	3
(Czech Republic) T Martincová	1	5
(Brazil) G Cé	6	7
(Canada) H El Tabakh	3	3
(Belgium) E Mertens	6	6
(Latvia) D Marcinkēviča	6	5	3
8	(Romania) A Cadanțu	2	7	6

Second round
1	(United States) I Falconi	6	6
Q	(Russia) V Savinykh	1	0
Q	(Hungary) M Czink	4	2^{r}
6	(Israel) J Glushko	6	4
3	(Belgium) A-S Mestach	7^{7}	7^{8}
(Brazil) G Cé	6^{0}	6^{6}
(Belgium) E Mertens	6	4	5
8	(Romania) A Cadanțu	3	6	7

Quarterfinals
1	(United States) I Falconi	6^{9}	0
6	(Israel) J Glushko	7^{11}	6
3	(Belgium) A-S Mestach	6	6
8	(Romania) A Cadanțu	1	1

Semifinals
6	(Israel) J Glushko	4	5
3	(Belgium) A-S Mestach	6	7

=== Bottom half ===
First round
7	(Netherlands) A Rus	6	6
(Argentina) F Molinero	3	0
(Argentina) C Pella	0	2
Q	(Romania) PM Țig	6	6
WC	(Mexico) V Rodríguez	7^{9}	4	1
(Croatia) P Martić	6^{7}	6	6
(Brazil) PC Gonçalves	2	7^{7}	3
4	(Colombia) M Duque	6	6^{2}	6
5	(Argentina) M Irigoyen	2	1
(Slovenia) N Kolar	6	6
WC	(Mexico) X Hermoso	6	6
(Brazil) L Pigossi	0	3
(Serbia) D Erić	4	4
(Mexico) AS Sánchez	6	6
WC	(Mexico) M Zacarías	6^{4}	3
2	(Spain) L Domínguez Lino	7^{7}	6

Second round
7	(Netherlands) A Rus	1	3
Q	(Romania) PM Țig	6	6
(Croatia) P Martić	6^{2}	6^{3}
4	(Colombia) M Duque	7^{7}	7^{7}
(Slovenia) N Kolar	4	6	6
WC	(Mexico) X Hermoso	6	1	2
(Mexico) AS Sánchez	5	3
2	(Spain) L Domínguez Lino	7	6

Quarterfinals
Q	(Romania) PM Țig	7	7^{7}
4	(Colombia) M Duque	5	6^{5}
(Slovenia) N Kolar	6	4	3
2	(Spain) L Domínguez Lino	3	6	6

Semifinals
Q	(Romania) PM Țig	4	6	4
2	(Spain) L Domínguez Lino	6	4	6
