= 2014 Internacional Femenil Monterrey – Doubles =

Doubles
- 2014 Internacional Femenil Monterrey

Final
- Champions: (Spain) Lourdes Domínguez Lino (Colombia) Mariana Duque
- Runners-up: (Belgium) Elise Mertens (Netherlands) Arantxa Rus
- Score: 6–3, 7–6^{(7–4)}

Events
| Singles | Doubles |
| ← 2013 · | Internacional Femenil Monterrey | · 2015 → |

This was the doubles event in a professional tennis tournament in Monterrey, Mexico.

Florencia Molinero and Laura Pigossi were the defending champions, having won the event in 2013, but lost in the first round.

Lourdes Domínguez Lino and Mariana Duque won the title, defeating Elise Mertens and Arantxa Rus in the final, 6–3, 7–6^{(7–4)}.

== Seeds ==
1. (United States) Irina Falconi / (Argentina) María Irigoyen (semifinals)
2. (Spain) Lourdes Domínguez Lino / (Colombia) Mariana Duque
3. (Argentina) Florencia Molinero / (Brazil) Laura Pigossi (first round)
4. (Croatia) Petra Martić / (Croatia) Ana Vrljić (semifinals)

== Draw ==
=== Key ===
- Q = Qualifier
- WC = Wild card
- LL = Lucky loser
- Alt = Alternate
- SE = Special exempt
- PR = Protected ranking
- ITF = ITF entry
- JE = Junior exempt
- w/o = Walkover
- r = Retired
- d = Defaulted
- SR = Special ranking

First round
1 | (United States) I Falconi (Argentina) M Irigoyen | 6 | 6
(Ukraine) K Bondarenko (Canada) H El Tabakh | 2 | 3
(Czech Republic) P Krejsová (Slovakia) C Škamlová | 6 | 6
WC | (Mexico) C Betancourt (United States) D Muresan | 2 | 3
3 | (Argentina) F Molinero (Brazil) L Pigossi | 5 | 2
WC | (Mexico) X Hermoso (Spain) L Pous Tió | 7 | 6
(Latvia) D Marcinkēviča (Slovakia) L Wienerová | 6 | 4 | [4]
(Belgium) E Mertens (Netherlands) A Rus | 4 | 6 | [10]
(Argentina) V Furlanetto (Argentina) C Pella | 6 | 3 | [6]
(Romania) A Cadanțu (Israel) J Glushko | 2 | 6 | [10]
(Mexico) V Rodríguez (Mexico) M Zacarías | 2 | 4
4 | (Croatia) P Martić (Croatia) A Vrljić | 6 | 6
(Paraguay) M González (Mexico) AS Sánchez | 6 | 2
WC | (Germany) K Grajdek (Czech Republic) T Martincová | 4 | 0^{r}
(Brazil) G Cé (Turkey) P Özgen | 4 | 2
2 | (Spain) L Domínguez Lino (Colombia) M Duque | 6 | 6

Quarterfinals
1 | (United States) I Falconi (Argentina) M Irigoyen | 6 | 7
(Czech Republic) P Krejsová (Slovakia) C Škamlová | 3 | 5
WC | (Mexico) X Hermoso (Spain) L Pous Tió | 4 | 4
(Belgium) E Mertens (Netherlands) A Rus | 6 | 6
(Romania) A Cadanțu (Israel) J Glushko | 2 | 7^{7} | [4]
4 | (Croatia) P Martić (Croatia) A Vrljić | 6 | 6^{2} | [10]
(Paraguay) M González (Mexico) AS Sánchez | 6 | 3 | [5]
2 | (Spain) L Domínguez Lino (Colombia) M Duque | 3 | 6 | [10]

Semifinals
1 | (United States) I Falconi (Argentina) M Irigoyen | 2 | 4
(Belgium) E Mertens (Netherlands) A Rus | 6 | 6
4 | (Croatia) P Martić (Croatia) A Vrljić | 5 | 2
2 | (Spain) L Domínguez Lino (Colombia) M Duque | 7 | 6

Final
(Belgium) E Mertens (Netherlands) A Rus | 3 | 6^{4}
2 | (Spain) L Domínguez Lino (Colombia) M Duque | 6 | 7^{7}
