= Ysaline Bonaventure =

Belgian tennis player (born 1994)

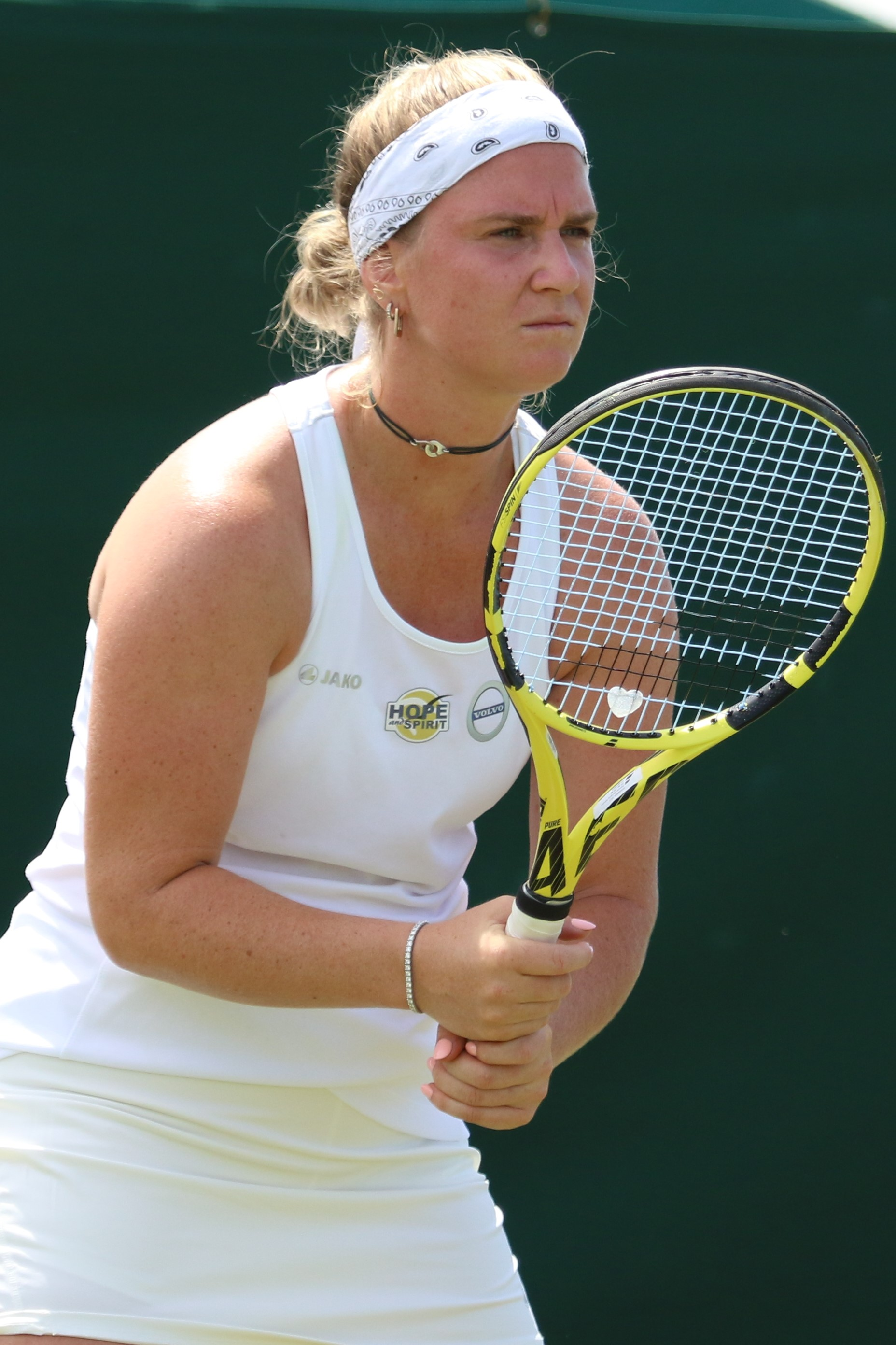
- Bonaventure at the 2022 Wimbledon Championships
- Country (sports): Belgium
- Residence: Stavelot, Belgium
- Born: 29 August 1994 (age 31) Rocourt, Liège, Belgium
- Height: 1.78 m (5 ft 10 in)
- Turned pro: 2011
- Retired: 2025
- Plays: Left (two-handed backhand)
- Coach: Hugo Guerriero, Germain Gigounon (–2020)
- Prize money: $1,606,256

Singles
- Career record: 366–275
- Career titles: 12 ITF
- Highest ranking: No. 81 (22 May 2023)

Grand Slam singles results
- Australian Open: 1R (2019, 2021, 2023)
- French Open: 1R (2022, 2023)
- Wimbledon: 1R (2019, 2023)
- US Open: 2R (2020)

Doubles
- Career record: 167–114
- Career titles: 2 WTA, 14 ITF
- Highest ranking: No. 57 (1 February 2016)
- Current ranking: No. 872 (3 November 2025)

Grand Slam doubles results
- Australian Open: 2R (2016)
- French Open: 2R (2015, 2023)
- Wimbledon: 1R (2015, 2018, 2023)

Team competitions
- Fed Cup: 10–9
- Last updated on: 6 November 2025.

Ysaline Bonaventure (French pronunciation: [izalin bɔnavɑ̃tyʁ]; born 29 August 1994) is a Belgian former professional tennis player. On 6 March 2023, she reached her best singles ranking of world No. 81. On 1 February 2016, she peaked at No. 57 in the doubles rankings. Bonaventure won two doubles titles on the WTA Tour, as well as 12 singles and 14 doubles titles on the ITF Women's Circuit.

Playing for Belgium Fed Cup team, Bonaventure had a win–loss record of 10–9 (as of March 2024). She was selected for the Fed Cup team for the first time in 2012 when she played a doubles match alongside Alison Van Uytvanck in the World Group play-offs.

== Career ==
=== 2015-16: Two WTA Tour titles and top 60 in doubles ===
Bonaventure lost in the first round of qualifying at the 2015 Australian Open and French Open. At the 2015 Wimbledon Championships, she also lost in the first round of qualifying, beaten in three sets by Michelle Larcher de Brito. She reached the third round of qualifying at the US Open of that year.

She won two WTA Tour doubles titles that year, showing her ability in doubles, her focus slowly shifting towards singles after 2015. She subsequently reached a career-high ranking in doubles of No. 57 in February 2016.

=== 2018-20: Top 150 & major debut ===
She lost again in the third and final round of qualifying at Roland Garros in 2018, before making her major main-draw debut in 2019, at the Australian Open and then at Wimbledon. She also reached as a qualifier the quarterfinals in Rabat, before losing to compatriot Alison Van Uytvanck, and the third round in Indian Wells, where she defeated wildcard Taylor Townsend and 28th seed Donna Vekić, before losing to Karolína Plíšková.

In 2020, she finally won a match in the main draw of a major at the US Open in New York.

=== 2022: Top 100 ===
At the French Open, she qualified to make her debut at this major thus finally completing the set of main-draw appearances at all four major tournaments.

She reached the top 100 on 31 October 2022, at world No. 94.

=== 2023: First WTA Tour semifinal ===
At the Auckland Open, she reached her first WTA Tour semifinal as a qualifier, defeating eighth seed Rebecca Marino and third seed Leylah Fernandez. She made her second quarterfinal of the season at the Monterrey Open with a win over qualifiers Despina Papamichail and Kamilla Rakhimova. She lost to eventual champion Donna Vekić in three sets and recorded a new career-high of world No. 84, on 6 March 2023.

=== 2024–2025: Knee surgery and retirement ===
Having withdrawn during qualifying at the 2024 Australian Open due to a knee injury which subsequently required surgery, Bonaventure won just one of eight matches following her return to competitive action and announced her final retirement from professional tennis in March 2025.

== Performance timelines ==
Key
W	F	SF	QF	#R	RR	Q#	P#	DNQ	A	Z#	PO	G	S	B	NMS	NTI	P	NH

(W) winner; (F) finalist; (SF) semifinalist; (QF) quarterfinalist; (#R) rounds 4, 3, 2, 1; (RR) round-robin stage; (Q#) qualification round; (P#) preliminary round; (DNQ) did not qualify; (A) absent; (Z#) Davis/Fed Cup Zonal Group (with number indication) or (PO) play-off; (G) gold, (S) silver or (B) bronze Olympic/Paralympic medal; (NMS) not a Masters tournament; (NTI) not a Tier I tournament; (P) postponed; (NH) not held; (SR) strike rate (events won / competed); (W–L) win–loss record.
To avoid confusion and double counting, these charts are updated at the conclusion of a tournament or when the player's participation has ended.

Only main-draw results in WTA Tour, Grand Slam tournaments, Fed Cup/Billie Jean King Cup and Olympic Games are included in win–loss records.

=== Singles ===
Current through the 2023 French Open.

Tournament	2015	2016	2017	2018	2019	2020	2021	2022	2023	2024	SR	W–L	Win%
Grand Slam tournaments
Australian Open	Q1	Q2	A	Q2	1R	Q2	1R	Q2	1R	Q2	0 / 3	0–3	0%
French Open	Q1	Q2	A	Q3	Q1	A	Q1	1R	1R	A	0 / 2	0–2	0%
Wimbledon	Q1	Q1	A	Q2	1R	NH	Q2	Q2	1R	A	0 / 2	0–2	0%
US Open	Q3	Q2	Q1	Q2	Q1	2R	Q2	Q2	A	Q1	0 / 1	1–1	50%
Win–loss	0–0	0–0	0–0	0–0	0–2	1–1	0–1	0–1	0–3	0–0	0 / 8	1–8	11%
WTA 1000
Dubai / Qatar Open (Note: The first Premier 5 event of the year has switched back and forth between the Dubai Tennis Championships and the Qatar Ladies Open since 2009. Dubai was classified as a Premier 5 event from 2009 to 2011 before being succeeded by Doha for the 2012–2014 period. In 2015, Dubai regained its Premier 5 status while Doha was demoted to Premier status. The Premier 5 tournaments were reclassified as WTA 1000 tournaments in 2021.)	A	A	A	A	A	Q1	Q1	A	A	A	0 / 0	0–0	–
Indian Wells Open	A	A	A	A	3R	NH	A	A	1R	A	0 / 2	2–2	67%
Miami Open	A	A	A	Q2	A	NH	A	A	Q1	A	0 / 0	0–0	–
Madrid Open	A	A	A	A	A	NH	A	A	Q1	A	0 / 0	0–0	–
Italian Open	A	A	A	A	A	A	A	A	1R	A	0 / 1	0–1	0%
Canadian Open	A	A	A	A	Q1	NH	A	A	A	A	0 / 0	0–0	–
Cincinnati Open	A	A	A	A	A	Q2	A	A	A	A	0 / 0	0–0	–
Career statistics
Tournaments	1	3	0	5	17	3	5	3	10	3	Career total: 50		
Overall win–loss	0–1	0–3	0–0	4–5	10–17	2–4	3–5	3–4	8–11	0–0	0 / 50	30–50	38%
Win(%)	0%	0%	–	44%	37%	33%	38%	43%	50%	–	Career total: 38%		
Year-end ranking	156	232	181	150	115	122	228	96	191	933	$1,417,110		

=== Doubles ===
Tournament	2015	2016	2017	2018	...	2023	SR	W–L	Win%
Australian Open	A	2R	A	A		A	0 / 1	1–1	50%
French Open	2R	A	A	A		2R	0 / 2	2–2	50%
Wimbledon	1R	A	A	1R		1R	0 / 3	0–3	0%
US Open	A	A	A	A		A	0 / 0	0–0	–
Win–loss	1–2	1–1	0–0	0–1		1–2	0 / 6	3–6	33%

== WTA Tour finals ==
=== Doubles: 2 (2 titles) ===
Legend WTA 1000 WTA 500 WTA 250 (2–0)	Finals by surface Hard (1–0) Clay (1–0)

Result	W–L	Date	Tournament	Tier	Surface	Partner	Opponents	Score
Win	1–0	Feb 2015	Rio Open, Brazil	International (Note: The WTA International tournaments were reclassified as WTA 250 tournaments in 2021.)	Clay	(Sweden) Rebecca Peterson	(Romania) Irina-Camelia Begu (Argentina) María Irigoyen	3–0 ret.
Win	2–0	Apr 2015	Katowice Open, Poland	International	Hard (i)	(Netherlands) Demi Schuurs	(Italy) Gioia Barbieri (Italy) Karin Knapp	7–5, 4–6, [10–6]

== ITF Circuit finals ==
=== Singles: 25 (12 titles, 13 runner-ups) ===
Legend $100,000 tournaments (0–2) $80,000 tournaments (0–1) $50/60,000 tournaments (4–1) $25,000 tournaments (3–4) $10/15,000 tournaments (5–5)	Finals by surface Hard (4–8) Clay (7–5) Carpet (1–0)

Result	W–L	Date	Tournament	Tier	Surface	Opponent	Score
Loss	0–1	Mar 2012	ITF Amiens, France	10,000	Clay	(Bulgaria) Isabella Shinikova	3–6, 6–0, 3–6
Loss	0–2	Mar 2012	ITF Le Havre, France	10,000	Clay	(France) Myrtille Georges	7–5, 5–7, 0–6
Win	1–2	Jun 2012	ITF Meppel, Netherlands	10,000	Clay	(Germany) Julia Kimmelmann	6–2, 6–4
Loss	1–3	Jul 2012	ITF Knokke, Belgium	10,000	Clay	(Australia) Jessica Moore	1–6, 6–7^{(4)}
Win	2–3	Jul 2012	ITF Maaseik, Belgium	10,000	Clay	(Russia) Natalia Orlova	6–2, 6–1
Loss	2–4	Feb 2013	ITF Bron, France	10,000	Hard	(Ukraine) Maryna Zanevska	2–6, 1–6
Win	3–4	May 2013	ITF Båstad, Sweden	10,000	Clay	(Sweden) Ellen Allgurin	6–1, 6–2
Win	4–4	Jun 2013	ITF Amstelveen, Netherlands	10,000	Clay	(Netherlands) Cindy Burger	6–4, 6–2
Loss	4–5	Sep 2013	ITF Berlin, Germany	15,000	Clay	(Czech Republic) Diana Šumová	3–6, 5–7
Loss	4–6	Jan 2014	Open Andrézieux-Bouthéon, France	25,000	Hard (i)	(Switzerland) Timea Bacsinszky	1–6, 1–6
Win	5–6	Jun 2014	ITF Kristinehamn, Sweden	25,000	Clay	(Russia) Marina Melnikova	6–3, 6–3
Loss	5–7	Aug 2014	ITF Westende, Belgium	25,000	Hard	(Spain) Sara Sorribes Tormo	2–6, 0–6
Loss	5–8	Oct 2014	ITF Florence, United States	25,000	Hard	(United States) CiCi Bellis	2–6, 1–6
Win	6–8	Jul 2015	ITF Darmstadt, Germany	25,000	Clay	(Slovenia) Dalila Jakupović	6–3, 7–6
Win	7–8	Sep 2015	Internacional de Monterrey, Mexico	50,000	Hard	(Paraguay) Montserrat González	6–1, 6–2
Win	8–8	Feb 2016	AK Ladies Open, Germany	25,000	Carpet (i)	(Netherlands) Arantxa Rus	6–3, 6–3
Win	9–8	Apr 2017	ITF Antalya, Turkey	15,000	Clay	(Japan) Yuuki Tanaka	6–4, 6–2
Loss	9–9	Jul 2017	President's Cup, Kazakhstan	100,000+H	Hard	(China) Zhang Shuai	3–6, 4–6
Loss	9–10	Oct 2017	ITF Florence, United States	25,000	Hard	(United States) Taylor Townsend	1–6, 5–7
Win	10–10	Nov 2017	Toronto Challenger, Canada	60,000	Hard (i)	(Switzerland) Patty Schnyder	7–6^{(3)}, 6–3
Win	11–10	Jan 2020	Open Andrézieux-Bouthéon, France	60,000	Hard (i)	(Netherlands) Arantxa Rus	6–4, 7–6^{(3)}
Win	12–10	Jan 2022	Bendigo International, Australia	60,000+H	Hard	(Andorra) Victoria Jiménez Kasintseva	6–3, 6–1
Loss	12–11	Jul 2022	Reinert Open, Germany	100,000	Hard	(Czech Republic) Linda Nosková	1–6, 3–6
Loss	12–12	Oct 2022	Hamburg Ladies & Gents Cup, Germany	60,000	Hard (i)	(Spain) Rebeka Masarova	4–6, 3–6
Loss	12–13	Oct 2022	Internationaux de Poitiers, France	80,000	Hard (i)	(Croatia) Petra Marčinko	3–6, 6–7^{(2)}

=== Doubles: 20 (14 titles, 6 runner-ups) ===
Legend $100,000 tournaments (0–1) $80,000 tournaments (1–0) $60,000 tournaments (4–1) $25,000 tournaments (6–2) $10/15,000 tournaments (3–2)	Finals by surface Hard (7–2) Clay (6–4) Carpet (1–0)

Result	W–L	Date	Tournament	Tier	Surface	Partner	Opponents	Score
Win	1–0	Jun 2012	ITF Meppel, Netherlands	10,000	Clay	(Netherlands) Nicolette van Uitert	(Netherlands) Marritt Boonstra (Germany) Vivian Heisen	6–1, 4–6, [10–7]
Win	2–0	Jun 2012	ITF Breda, Netherlands	10,000	Clay	(Bulgaria) Isabella Shinikova	(Germany) Carolin Daniels (Switzerland) Xenia Knoll	6–4, 7–6^{(5)}
Loss	2–1	May 2013	ITF Båstad, Sweden	10,000	Clay	(Russia) Maria Mokh	(Netherlands) Cindy Burger (Serbia) Milana Špremo	1–6, 4–6
Win	3–1	Sep 2013	ITF Berlin, Germany	15,000	Clay	(Sweden) Cornelia Lister	(Czech Republic) Lenka Kunčíková (Czech Republic) Karolína Stuchlá	6–4, 3–6, [10–5]
Loss	3–2	Jun 2014	Bredeney Ladies Open, Germany	25,000	Clay	(Bulgaria) Elitsa Kostova	(Germany) Kristina Barrois (Germany) Tatjana Maria	2–6, 2–6
Loss	3–3	Jun 2014	ITF Kristinehamn, Sweden	25,000	Clay	(Poland) Sandra Zaniewska	(Ukraine) Kateryna Bondarenko (Sweden) Cornelia Lister	w/o
Win	4–3	Aug 2014	ITF Koksijde, Belgium	25,000	Clay	(Netherlands) Richèl Hogenkamp	(United States) Bernarda Pera (Netherlands) Demi Schuurs	6–4, 6–4
Win	5–3	Aug 2014	ITF Westende, Belgium	25,000	Hard	(Belgium) Elise Mertens	(Russia) Marina Melnikova (Russia) Evgeniya Rodina	6–2, 6–2
Win	6–3	Oct 2014	Saguenay Challenger, Canada	50,000	Hard (i)	(United Kingdom) Nicola Slater	(Canada) Sonja Molnar (United States) Caitlin Whoriskey	6–4, 6–4
Win	7–3	Mar 2015	ITF Curitiba, Brazil	25,000	Clay	(Sweden) Rebecca Peterson	(Spain) Beatriz García Vidagany (Argentina) Florencia Molinero	4–6, 6–3, [10–5]
Win	8–3	Sep 2015	Internacional Monterrey, Mexico	50,000	Hard	(Belgium) Elise Mertens	(Russia) Marina Melnikova (Luxembourg) Mandy Minella	6–4, 3–6, [11–9]
Win	9–3	Oct 2015	Abierto Victoria, Mexico	50,000	Hard	(Belgium) Elise Mertens	(Argentina) María Irigoyen (Czech Republic) Barbora Krejčíková	6–4, 4–6, [10–6]
Win	10–3	Feb 2016	AK Ladies Open, Germany	25,000	Carpet (i)	(Switzerland) Xenia Knoll	(Israel) Deniz Khazaniuk (Russia) Maria Marfutina	6–1, 6–4
Loss	10–4	Apr 2017	ITF Antalya, Turkey	15,000	Clay	(Belgium) Marie Benoît	(Finland) Emma Laine (Japan) Yuuki Tanaka	6–3, 1–6, [4–10]
Loss	10–5	Jul 2017	President's Cup, Kazakhstan	100,000	Hard	(United Kingdom) Naomi Broady	(Russia) Natela Dzalamidze (Russia) Veronika Kudermetova	2–6, 0–6
Win	11–5	Sep 2017	Batumi Ladies Open, Georgia	25,000	Hard	(Slovakia) Viktória Kužmová	(Georgia (country)) Tatia Mikadze (Georgia (country)) Sofia Shapatava	6–1, 6–3
Loss	11–6	Nov 2017	Toronto Challenger, Canada	60,000	Hard (i)	(Mexico) Victoria Rodríguez	(Chile) Alexa Guarachi (New Zealand) Erin Routliffe	6–7^{(4)}, 6–3, [4–10]
Win	12–6	Jan 2018	Open Andrézieux-Bouthéon, France	60,000	Hard (i)	(Netherlands) Bibiane Schoofs	(Italy) Camilla Rosatello (Belgium) Kimberley Zimmermann	4–6, 7–5, [10–7]
Win	13–6	Feb 2018	GB Pro-Series Glasgow, UK	25,000	Hard (i)	(Greece) Valentini Grammatikopoulou	(Hungary) Dalma Gálfi (Poland) Katarzyna Piter	7–5, 6–4
Win	14–6	Sep 2021	Internacional de Valencia, Spain	80,000	Clay	(Georgia (country)) Ekaterine Gorgodze	(Spain) Ángela Fita Boluda (Russia) Oksana Selekhmeteva	6–2, 2–6, [10–6]
