= Internacional Femenil Monterrey =

Women's World Tennis Tour
- Event name: Monterrey
- Location: Monterrey, Mexico
- Venue: Sierra Madre Tennis Club
- Category: ITF Women's Circuit
- Surface: Hard
- Draw: 32S/32Q/16D
- Prize money: $50,000
- Website: Official website

The Internacional Femenil Monterrey was a tournament for professional female tennis players played on outdoor hard courts. The event was classified as a $50,000 ITF Women's Circuit tournament and was held in Monterrey, Mexico, from 2013 to 2015.

== Past finals ==
=== Singles ===
Year	Champion	Runner-up	Score
2015	(Belgium) Ysaline Bonaventure	(Paraguay) Montserrat González	6–1, 6–2
2014	(Belgium) An-Sophie Mestach	(Spain) Lourdes Domínguez Lino	6–3, 7–5
2013	(Venezuela) Adriana Pérez	(Netherlands) Indy de Vroome	4–6, 6–4, 6–3

=== Doubles ===
Year	Champions	Runners-up	Score
2015	(Belgium) Ysaline Bonaventure (Belgium) Elise Mertens	(Russia) Marina Melnikova (Luxembourg) Mandy Minella	6–4, 3–6, [11–9]
2014	(Spain) Lourdes Domínguez Lino (Colombia) Mariana Duque	(Belgium) Elise Mertens (Netherlands) Arantxa Rus	6–3, 7–6^{(7–4)}
2013	(Argentina) Florencia Molinero (Brazil) Laura Pigossi	(Netherlands) Indy de Vroome (Slovakia) Lenka Wienerová	7–5, 7–5
