= Carolina Betancourt =

Mexican tennis player (born 1981)

- Country (sports): Mexico
- Residence: San Luis, Mexico
- Born: 31 March 1993 (age 33) San Luis
- Plays: Right (two-handed backhand)
- Prize money: $32,993

Singles
- Career record: 79–99
- Career titles: 1 ITF
- Highest ranking: No. 561 (2 March 2015)

Doubles
- Career record: 70–81
- Career titles: 4 ITF
- Highest ranking: No. 402 (14 September 2015)

Team competitions
- Fed Cup: 2–1

Carolina Betancourt (born 30 October 1981) is a Mexican former tennis player.

She has a career-high singles WTA ranking of 561, achieved on 2 March 2015. On 14 September 2015, Betancourt peaked at No. 402 in the doubles rankings. She won one singles title and four doubles titles on the ITF Women's Circuit.

Betancourt made her WTA Tour main-draw debut at the 2011 Mexican Open in the doubles event, partnering Giovanna Manifacio and losing in the first round.

Playing for Mexico Fed Cup team, Betancourt has a win–loss record of 2–1.

== ITF finals ==
$25,000 tournaments
$10,000 tournaments

=== Singles (1–0) ===
Result	Date	Tournament	Surface	Opponent	Score
Win	8 June 2014	ITF Pachuca, Mexico	Hard	(Chile) Fernanda Brito	5–3 ret.

=== Doubles (4–5) ===
Result	Date	Tournament	Surface	Partner	Opponents	Score
Win	13 June 2011	ITF Coatzacoalcos, Mexico	Hard	(Puerto Rico) Jessica Roland-Pratt	(United States) Yawna Allen (United States) Whitney Jones	6–1, 6–0
Loss	5 Aug 2012	ITF Wrexham, United Kingdom	Hard	(Canada) Elisabeth Fournier	(Japan) Yuka Higuchi (Japan) Hirono Watanabe	0–6, 6–2, [8–10]
Win	12 May 2013	ITF Ramat HaSharon, Israel	Hard	(United States) Molly Scott	(Israel) Ekaterina Tour (Germany) Alina Wessel	6–7, 6–4, [10–4]
Win	25 Aug 2013	ITF San Luis Potosí, Mexico	Hard	(Mexico) Camila Fuentes	(Mexico) Ana Sofía Sánchez (Mexico) Marcela Zacarías	6–2, 6–3
Loss	2 Nov 2013	ITF Quintana Roo, Mexico	Hard	(Mexico) Camila Fuentes	(Canada) Khristina Blajkevitch (France) Brandy Mina	6–7^{(2)}, 2–6
Loss	6 July 2014	ITF Quintana Roo, Mexico	Hard	(Paraguay) Ana Paula Neffa de los Ríos	(Spain) Loreto Alonso Martínez (Mexico) Fernanda Navarro	4–6, 2–6
Loss	25 Oct 2014	Abierto Victoria, Mexico	Hard	(Slovakia) Lenka Wienerová	(Romania) Patricia Maria Țig (Brazil) Maria Fernanda Alves	1–6, 2–6
Win	6 June 2015	ITF Manzanillo, Mexico	Hard	(Samoa) Steffi Carruthers	(United States) Tornado Alicia Black (United States) Dasha Ivanova	6–3, 6–3
Loss	28 June 2015	ITF Manzanillo, Mexico	Hard	(Chile) Daniela Seguel	(Mexico) Camila Fuentes (United States) Zoë Gwen Scandalis	3–6, 7–5, [10–12]
