= 2022 Abierto Tampico =

- Date: 24–29 October
- Edition: 6th
- Category: WTA 125
- Prize money: $115,000
- Surface: Hard
- Location: Tampico, Mexico
- Venue: Centro Libanés Mexicano de Tampico

Champions

Singles
- (Italy) Elisabetta Cocciaretto

Doubles
- (Slovakia) Tereza Mihalíková / (Indonesia) Aldila Sutjiadi
| ← 2017 · | Abierto Tampico | · 2023 → |

The 2022 Abierto Tampico was a professional tennis tournament played on outdoor hard courts. It was the sixth edition of the tournament and first as a WTA 125 tournament. It took place at the Centro Libanés Mexicano de Tampico in Tampico, Mexico, between 24 and 29 October 2022.

== Champions ==
=== Singles ===
- (Italy) Elisabetta Cocciaretto def. (Poland) Magda Linette 7–6^{(7–5)}, 4–6, 6–1

=== Doubles ===
- (Slovakia) Tereza Mihalíková / (Indonesia) Aldila Sutjiadi def. (United States) Ashlyn Krueger / (United States) Elizabeth Mandlik 7–5, 6–2

== Singles entrants ==
=== Seeds ===
| Country | Player | Rank^{1} | Seed |
|---|---|---|---|
| BEL | Elise Mertens | 34 | 1 |
| CZE | Marie Bouzková | 38 | 2 |
| CAN | Leylah Fernandez | 41 | 3 |
| CZE | Kateřina Siniaková | 54 | 4 |
| POL | Magda Linette | 57 | 5 |
| CHN | Zhu Lin | 69 | 6 |
| COL | Camila Osorio | 71 | 7 |
| CAN | Rebecca Marino | 80 | 8 |

- ^{1} Rankings as of 17 October 2022.

=== Other entrants ===
The following players received a wildcard into the singles main draw:

- (Canada) Eugenie Bouchard
- (Czech Republic) Marie Bouzková
- (Canada) Leylah Fernandez
- (Belgium) Elise Mertens
- (Czech Republic) Kateřina Siniaková

The following player received entry into the main draw through protected ranking:

- Varvara Flink

The following players received entry from the qualifying draw:

- (Canada) Bianca Fernandez
- (United States) Elvina Kalieva
- (Indonesia) Aldila Sutjiadi
- (United States) Sachia Vickery

=== Withdrawals ===
Before the tournament

- (Canada) Bianca Andreescu → replaced by (Canada) Carol Zhao
- (Czech Republic) Linda Fruhvirtová → replaced by (United States) Ashlyn Krueger
- Anna Kalinskaya → replaced by (China) You Xiaodi
- (Ukraine) Marta Kostyuk → replaced by (Germany) Anna-Lena Friedsam
- (United States) Ann Li → replaced by (United States) Alycia Parks
- (Spain) Nuria Párrizas Díaz → replaced by (Netherlands) Eva Vedder
- (Ukraine) Lesia Tsurenko → replaced by Elina Avanesyan
- (Croatia) Donna Vekić → replaced by (Japan) Nao Hibino

== Doubles entrants ==
=== Seeds ===
| Country | Player | Country | Player | Rank^{1} | Seed |
|---|---|---|---|---|---|
| SVK | Tereza Mihalíková | INA | Aldila Sutjiadi | 109 | 1 |
| USA | Kaitlyn Christian | | Lidziya Marozava | 131 | 2 |
| VEN | Andrea Gámiz | NED | Eva Vedder | 226 | 3 |
| GER | Anna-Lena Friedsam | UKR | Nadiia Kichenok | 227 | 4 |

- ^{1} Rankings as of 17 October 2022.

=== Other entrants ===
The following pair received a wildcard into the doubles main draw:

- (Mexico) Ana Paola González Domínguez / (Mexico) Quetzali Vázquez Montesinos

=== Withdrawals ===
Before the tournament

- (Mexico) Fernanda Contreras Gómez / (United States) Alycia Parks → replaced by (United States) Elvina Kalieva / (Mexico) Renata Zarazúa
- (Chile) Alexa Guarachi / (United States) Asia Muhammad → replaced by (Canada) Bianca Fernandez / (Canada) Leylah Fernandez
