= 2022 Abierto Tampico – Singles =

Singles
- 2022 Abierto Tampico

Final
- Champion: (Italy) Elisabetta Cocciaretto
- Runner-up: (Poland) Magda Linette
- Score: 7–6^{(7–5)}, 4–6, 6–1

Details
- Draw: 32 (4 WC)
- Seeds: 8

Events
Singles	Doubles
Abierto Tampico	· 2023 →

This was the first edition of the tournament as a WTA 125 tournament.

Elisabetta Cocciaretto defeated Magda Linette in the final, 7–6^{(7–5)}, 4–6, 6–1 to win the inaugural women's singles tennis title at the 2022 Abierto Tampico Open. This was Cocciaretto's first WTA 125 title.

== Seeds ==
1. (Belgium) Elise Mertens (quarterfinals)
2. (Czech Republic) Marie Bouzková (second round)
3. (Canada) Leylah Fernandez (quarterfinals)
4. (Czech Republic) Kateřina Siniaková (quarterfinals)
5. (Poland) Magda Linette (final)
6. (China) Zhu Lin (semifinals)
7. (Colombia) Camila Osorio (quarterfinals)
8. (Canada) Rebecca Marino (semifinals)

== Draw ==
=== Key ===
- Q = Qualifier
- WC = Wild card
- LL = Lucky loser
- Alt = Alternate
- SE = Special exempt
- PR = Protected ranking
- ITF = ITF entry
- JE = Junior exempt
- w/o = Walkover
- r = Retired
- d = Defaulted
- SR = Special ranking

=== Finals ===
Semifinals
5	(Poland) Magda Linette	3	6	6
8	(Canada) Rebecca Marino	6	3	4
6	(China) Zhu Lin	4	6^{4}
(Italy) Elisabetta Cocciaretto	6	7^{7}

Final
5	(Poland) Magda Linette	6^{5}	6	1
(Italy) Elisabetta Cocciaretto	7^{7}	4	6

=== Top half ===
First round
1/WC	(Belgium) E Mertens	6	7
Q	(United States) E Kalieva	2	5
(United States) A Krueger	6	7
Q	(Indonesia) A Sutjiadi	2	5
(Mexico) R Zarazúa	7	1	7
WC	(Canada) E Bouchard	5	6	5
Q	(Canada) B Fernandez	3	0
5	(Poland) M Linette	6	6
3/WC	(Canada) L Fernandez	7^{10}	6
(United States) E Mandlik	6^{8}	2
(China) X You	7^{7}	6
(Germany) A-L Friedsam	6^{6}	4
(Japan) M Uchijima	6	6
(United States) E Navarro	4	4
PR	V Flink	3	5
8	(Canada) R Marino	6	7

Second round
1/WC	(Belgium) E Mertens	6^{3}	6	6
(United States) A Krueger	7^{7}	3	1
(Mexico) R Zarazúa	3	5
5	(Poland) M Linette	6	7
3/WC	(Canada) L Fernandez	6	6
(China) X You	3	2
(Japan) M Uchijima	6^{4}	7^{10}	3
8	(Canada) R Marino	7^{7}	6^{8}	6

Quarterfinals
1/WC	(Belgium) E Mertens	5	2
5	(Poland) M Linette	7	6
3/WC	(Canada) L Fernandez	3	3
8	(Canada) R Marino	6	6

Semifinals
5	(Poland) M Linette	3	6	6
8	(Canada) R Marino	6	3	4

=== Bottom half ===
First round
6	(China) L Zhu	6	3	6
(Austria) J Grabher	4	6	0
V Gracheva	6	6
(Brazil) L Pigossi	4	1
Q	(United States) S Vickery	4	7^{7}	3
(Poland) M Fręch	6	6^{3}	6
(United States) A Parks	0	3
4/WC	(Czech Republic) K Siniaková	6	6
7	(Colombia) C Osorio	3	6	6
(Japan) N Hibino	6	3	3
(Hungary) RL Jani	6	1	3
(Netherlands) E Vedder	3	6	6
(Canada) C Zhao	0	3
(Italy) E Cocciaretto	6	6
E Avanesyan	6^{4}	3
2/WC	(Czech Republic) M Bouzková	7^{7}	6

Second round
6	(China) L Zhu	6	6
V Gracheva	1	2
(Poland) M Fręch	3	6^{7}
4/WC	(Czech Republic) K Siniaková	6	7^{9}
7	(Colombia) C Osorio	6	6
(Netherlands) E Vedder	3	2
(Italy) E Cocciaretto	2	6	7
2/WC	(Czech Republic) M Bouzková	6	3	5

Quarterfinals
6	(China) L Zhu	6	7
4/WC	(Czech Republic) K Siniaková	4	5
7	(Colombia) C Osorio	6	6^{5}	2
(Italy) E Cocciaretto	4	7^{7}	6

Semifinals
6	(China) L Zhu	4	6^{4}
(Italy) E Cocciaretto	6	7^{7}

== Qualifying ==
=== Seeds ===
1. (United States) Sachia Vickery (qualified)
2. (United States) Elvina Kalieva (qualified)
3. (Switzerland) Lulu Sun (qualifying competition, retired)
4. (China) You Xiaodi (moved to main draw)
5. Jana Kolodynska (qualifying competition)
6. (Venezuela) Andrea Gámiz (qualifying competition)
7. (Indonesia) Aldila Sutjiadi (qualified)
8. (Canada) Bianca Fernandez (qualified)

=== Qualifiers ===
1. (United States) Sachia Vickery
2. (United States) Elvina Kalieva
3. (Indonesia) Aldila Sutjiadi
4. (Canada) Bianca Fernandez

=== Qualifying draw ===
==== First qualifier ====
First round				Qualifying competition
				1	(United States) Sachia Vickery	7	6
				5	Jana Kolodynska	5	4
WC	Lidziya Marozava	1	1	5	Jana Kolodynska	5	4
5	Jana Kolodynska	6	6

==== Second qualifier ====
First round					Qualifying competition
					2	(United States) Elvina Kalieva	6	6
					6	(Venezuela) Andrea Gámiz	3	3
	(Slovakia) Tereza Mihalíková	7^{7}	5	0^{r}	6	(Venezuela) Andrea Gámiz	3	3
6	(Venezuela) Andrea Gámiz	6^{3}	7	0

==== Third qualifier ====
First round				Qualifying competition
				3	(Switzerland) Lulu Sun	6	6^{6}	0^{r}
				7	(Indonesia) Aldila Sutjiadi	4	7^{8}	3
WC	(Mexico) María Fernanda Martínez	2	2	7	(Indonesia) Aldila Sutjiadi	4	7^{8}	3
7	(Indonesia) Aldila Sutjiadi	6	6

==== Fourth qualifier ====
First round				Qualifying competition
					Bye
				8	(Canada) Bianca Fernandez
WC	(Mexico) Quetzali Vázquez Montesinos	1	4	8	(Canada) Bianca Fernandez
8	(Canada) Bianca Fernandez	6	6
