= 2022 Abierto Tampico – Doubles =

Doubles
- 2022 Abierto Tampico

Final
- Champions: (Slovakia) Tereza Mihalíková (Indonesia) Aldila Sutjiadi
- Runners-up: (United States) Ashlyn Krueger (United States) Elizabeth Mandlik
- Score: 7–5, 6–2

Details
- Draw: 13 (1 WC)
- Seeds: 4

Events
Singles	Doubles
Abierto Tampico	· 2023 →

This was the first edition of the tournament as a WTA 125 tournament.

Tereza Mihalíková and Aldila Sutjiadi won the title, defeating Ashlyn Krueger and Elizabeth Mandlik in the final, 7–5, 6–2.

== Seeds ==
1. (Slovakia) Tereza Mihalíková / (Indonesia) Aldila Sutjiadi (champions)
2. (United States) Kaitlyn Christian / Lidziya Marozava (quarterfinals)
3. (Venezuela) Andrea Gámiz / (Netherlands) Eva Vedder (quarterfinals)
4. (Germany) Anna-Lena Friedsam / (Ukraine) Nadiia Kichenok (semifinals)

== Draw ==
=== Key ===
- Q = Qualifier
- WC = Wild card
- LL = Lucky loser
- Alt = Alternate
- SE = Special exempt
- PR = Protected ranking
- ITF = ITF entry
- JE = Junior exempt
- w/o = Walkover
- r = Retired
- d = Defaulted
- SR = Special ranking

=== Draw ===
First round
V Flink (China) X You	6	1	[11]
E Avanesyan (Japan) N Hibino	3	6	[9]
4	(Germany) A-L Friedsam (Ukraine) N Kichenok	6	6
(Canada) R Marino (United States) I Neel	4	4
(United States) E Kalieva (Mexico) R Zarazúa	6	6
(United States) A Rogers (United States) C Rosca	2	2
WC	(Mexico) AP González Domínguez (Mexico) Q Vázquez Montesinos	1	0
(United States) A Krueger (United States) E Mandlik	6	6
(Japan) M Uchijima (China) L Zhu	6	6
(Canada) B Fernandez (Canada) L Fernandez	1	2

Quarterfinals
1	(Slovakia) T Mihalíková (Indonesia) A Sutjiadi	6	6
V Flink (China) X You	4	3
4	(Germany) A-L Friedsam (Ukraine) N Kichenok	1	6	[14]
(United States) E Kalieva (Mexico) R Zarazúa	6	3	[12]
(United States) A Krueger (United States) E Mandlik	5	6	[11]
3	(Venezuela) A Gámiz (Netherlands) E Vedder	7	4	[9]
(Japan) M Uchijima (China) L Zhu	1	6	[10]
2	(United States) K Christian; L Marozava	6	2	[5]

Semifinals
1	(Slovakia) T Mihalíková (Indonesia) A Sutjiadi	6	7^{7}
4	(Germany) A-L Friedsam (Ukraine) N Kichenok	3	6^{5}
(United States) A Krueger (United States) E Mandlik	6^{5}	7^{7}	[10]
(Japan) M Uchijima (China) L Zhu	7^{7}	6^{5}	[6]

Final
1	(Slovakia) T Mihalíková (Indonesia) A Sutjiadi	7	6
(United States) A Krueger (United States) E Mandlik	5	2
