= 2023 Abierto Tampico – Doubles =

Doubles
- 2023 Abierto Tampico

Final
- Champions: Kamilla Rakhimova; Anastasia Tikhonova
- Runners-up: (United States) Sabrina Santamaria (United Kingdom) Heather Watson
- Score: 7–6^{(7–5)}, 6–2

Details
- Draw: 13 (3 WC)
- Seeds: 4

Events
Singles	Doubles
← 2022 ·	Abierto Tampico	· 2024 →

Kamilla Rakhimova and Anastasia Tikhonova won the doubles title at the 2023 Abierto Tampico, defeating Sabrina Santamaria and Heather Watson in the final, 7–6^{(7–5)}, 6–2.

Tereza Mihalíková and Aldila Sutjiadi were the reigning champions, but Sutjiadi qualified for the WTA Elite Trophy and Mihalíková did not participate this year.

== Seeds ==
The top three seeds received byes into the quarterfinals.

1. (United States) Sabrina Santamaria / (United Kingdom) Heather Watson (final)
2. (Mexico) Fernanda Contreras / (United States) Angela Kulikov (withdrew)
3. Kamilla Rakhimova / Anastasia Tikhonova (champions)
4. (United States) Jessie Aney / (United States) Sofia Sewing (semifinals)

== Draw ==
Key

- Q = Qualifier
- WC = Wild card
- LL = Lucky loser
- Alt = Alternate
- ITF = ITF entry
- PR = Protected ranking
- SR = Special ranking
- SE = Special exempt
- JE = Junior exempt
- JR = Junior Accelerator Programme entrant
- CO = College Accelerator Programme entrant
- NG = Next Gen Accelerator Program entrant
- w/o = Walkover
- r = Retired
- d = Defaulted

=== Draw ===
First round
WC	(Colombia) E Arango (United States) K Scott	6	6
WC	(Mexico) A Fernández Villarreal (Mexico) D Schekaiban	0	0
4	(United States) J Aney (United States) S Sewing	6	7
(Mexico) V Rodríguez (Mexico) AS Sánchez	3	5
WC	(Mexico) D Martínez Guerrero (Mexico) F Regalado Macías	2	1
(Serbia) K Kozarov (United States) V Lepchenko	6	6
J Kolodynska (United States) A Lahey	4	6	[7]
(Cyprus) R Șerban (Mexico) R Zarazúa	6	3	[10]
(Mexico) J Hinojosa Gómez (France) C Monnet
(United States) H Baptiste (United States) W Osuigwe	w/o

Quarterfinals
1	(United States) S Santamaria (United Kingdom) H Watson	6	6
WC	(Colombia) E Arango (United States) K Scott	1	1
4	(United States) J Aney (United States) S Sewing	w/o
(Serbia) K Kozarov (United States) V Lepchenko
(Cyprus) R Șerban (Mexico) R Zarazúa	1	6	[6]
3	K Rakhimova; A Tikhonova	6	3	[10]
(United States) H Baptiste (United States) W Osuigwe	w/o
2	(Mexico) F Contreras (United States) A Kulikov

Semifinals
1	(United States) S Santamaria (United Kingdom) H Watson	6	6
4	(United States) J Aney (United States) S Sewing	1	4
3	K Rakhimova; A Tikhonova	7	6
(United States) H Baptiste (United States) W Osuigwe	5	4

Final
1	(United States) S Santamaria (United Kingdom) H Watson	6^{5}	2
3	K Rakhimova; A Tikhonova	7^{7}	6
