= 2023 Abierto Tampico – Singles =

Singles
- 2023 Abierto Tampico

Final
- Champion: (United States) Emina Bektas
- Runner-up: Anna Kalinskaya
- Score: 6–3, 3–6, 7–6^{(7–3)}

Details
- Draw: 32 (4 WC)
- Seeds: 8

Events
Singles	Doubles
← 2022 ·	Abierto Tampico	· 2024 →

Emina Bektas won the singles title at the 2023 Abierto Tampico, defeating Anna Kalinskaya in the final, 6–3, 3–6, 7–6^{(7–3)}.

Elisabetta Cocciaretto was the reigning champion, but did not participate.

== Seeds ==
1. (United States) Caroline Dolehide (quarterfinals)
2. (United States) Peyton Stearns (first round)
3. (United States) Taylor Townsend (withdrew)
4. Anna Kalinskaya (final)
5. Kamilla Rakhimova (semifinals)
6. (United States) Emina Bektas (champion)
7. (United States) Katie Volynets (quarterfinals)
8. (Colombia) Emiliana Arango (second round)

== Draw ==
=== Key ===
- Q = Qualifier
- WC = Wild card
- LL = Lucky loser
- Alt = Alternate
- SE = Special exempt
- PR = Protected ranking
- ITF = ITF entry
- JE = Junior exempt
- w/o = Walkover
- r = Retired
- d = Defaulted
- SR = Special ranking

=== Finals ===
Semifinals
6	(United States) Emina Bektas	6	3	6
5	Kamilla Rakhimova	4	6	3
4	Anna Kalinskaya	6	6
(United States) Elizabeth Mandlik	2	1

Final
6	(United States) Emina Bektas	6	3	7^{7}
4	Anna Kalinskaya	3	6	6^{3}

=== Top half ===
First round
1	(United States) C Dolehide	7^{8}	6
(United States) A Lahey	6^{6}	2
WC	(Mexico) V Rodríguez	6	6
LL	A Zolotareva	3	2
(Australia) A Tomljanović	7	6
(United States) W Osuigwe	5	2
(Mexico) R Zarazúa	2	4
6	(United States) E Bektas	6	6
LL	(Mexico) D Schekaiban	0	0
A Tikhonova	6	6
(Hungary) P Udvardy	6^{3}	6	6
Q	(Mexico) J Hinojosa Gómez	7^{7}	0	1
(Serbia) K Kozarov	6	6
(France) C Monnet	2	3
(Cyprus) R Șerban	0	2
5	K Rakhimova	6	6

Second round
1	(United States) C Dolehide	7^{8}	0	6
WC	(Mexico) V Rodríguez	6^{6}	6	2
(Australia) A Tomljanović	7^{7}	4	5
6	(United States) E Bektas	6^{2}	6	7
A Tikhonova	6	6
(Hungary) P Udvardy	3	3
(Serbia) K Kozarov	6	2	5
5	K Rakhimova	2	6	7

Quarterfinals
1	(United States) C Dolehide	1	2
6	(United States) E Bektas	6	6
A Tikhonova	1	2
5	K Rakhimova	6	6

Semifinals
6	(United States) E Bektas	6	3	6
5	K Rakhimova	4	6	3

=== Bottom half ===
First round
7	(United States) K Volynets	6	6
WC	(Mexico) AS Sánchez	1	2
(United States) K Scott	1	7^{7}	4
(United States) H Baptiste	6	6^{4}	6
J Kolodynska	4	6^{0}
(United States) V Lepchenko	6	7^{7}
(United States) J Aney	1	1
4	A Kalinskaya	6	6
8	(Colombia) E Arango	6	6
Q	(Mexico) D Martínez Guerrero	0	0
WC	(Mexico) F Contreras Gómez	6	7
(Andorra) V Jiménez Kasintseva	2	5
(United Kingdom) H Watson	6	1	3
(United States) A Li	4	6	6
(United States) E Mandlik	3	6	6
2/WC	(United States) P Stearns	6	1	3

Second round
7	(United States) K Volynets	6^{2}	6	6
(United States) H Baptiste	7^{7}	3	1
(United States) V Lepchenko	1	2
4	A Kalinskaya	6	6
8	(Colombia) E Arango	6	3	3
WC	(Mexico) F Contreras Gómez	4	6	6
(United States) A Li	7	2	6^{6}
(United States) E Mandlik	5	6	7^{8}

Quarterfinals
7	(United States) K Volynets	3	1
4	A Kalinskaya	6	6
WC	(Mexico) F Contreras Gómez
(United States) E Mandlik	w/o

Semifinals
4	A Kalinskaya	6	6
(United States) E Mandlik	2	1

== Qualifying ==
=== Seeds ===
1. (United States) Whitney Osuigwe (qualified)
2. (United States) Jessie Aney (qualified)
3. (Mexico) Jessica Hinojosa Gómez (qualified)
4. (Mexico) Fernanda Regalado Macías (qualifying competition)

=== Qualifiers ===
1. (United States) Whitney Osuigwe
2. (United States) Jessie Aney
3. (Mexico) Jessica Hinojosa Gómez
4. (Mexico) Daniela Martínez Guerrero

=== Lucky losers ===
1. Alina Zolotareva
2. (Mexico) Daniela Schekaiban

=== Qualifying draw ===
==== First qualifier ====
Qualifying competition
1	(United States) Whitney Osuigwe
	bye

==== Second qualifier ====
Qualifying competition
2	(United States) Jessie Aney	6	6
WC	(Mexico) Daniela Schekaiban	0	4

==== Third qualifier ====
Qualifying competition
3	(Mexico) Jessica Hinojosa Gómez	6	6
WC	Alina Zolotareva	3	1

==== Fourth qualifier ====
Qualifying competition
4/WC	(Mexico) Fernanda Regalado Macías	1	1
WC	(Mexico) Daniela Martínez Guerrero	6	6
