= 2022 Guadalajara Open Akron =

- Date: 17–23 October
- Edition: 1st
- Category: WTA 1000
- Draw: 56S / 28D
- Prize money: $2,527,250
- Surface: Hard / outdoor
- Location: Guadalajara, Mexico
- Venue: Panamerican Tennis Center

Champions

Singles
- (United States) Jessica Pegula

Doubles
- (Australia) Storm Sanders / (Brazil) Luisa Stefani
Guadalajara Open Akron	· 2023 →

In 2022, the WTA calendar was still being affected by the cancellation of women's professional tennis tournaments in China and Russia due to the COVID-19 pandemic, the Russian invasion of Ukraine, and concerns about the security and well-being of tennis player Peng Shuai after her allegations of sexual assault against Chinese Communist Party leader Zhang Gaoli. As a result, a WTA 1000 tournament was announced to be held in Guadalajara to compensate for it. This was the biggest women's tournament hosted by Mexico on outdoor hardcourts, since Guadalajara hosted the previous year's WTA Finals.

== Champions ==
=== Singles ===
- (United States) Jessica Pegula def. (Greece) Maria Sakkari, 6–2, 6–3

This is Pegula's first title of the year and second of her career.

=== Doubles ===
- (Australia) Storm Sanders / (Brazil) Luisa Stefani def. (Kazakhstan) Anna Danilina / (Brazil) Beatriz Haddad Maia 7–6^{(7–4)}, 6–7^{(2–7)}, [10–8]

== Point distribution ==
Event	W	F	SF	QF	Round of 16	Round of 32	Round of 56	Q	Q2	Q1
Singles	900	585	350	190	105	60	1	30	20	1
Doubles	900	585	350	190	105	1	—	—	—	—

== Prize money ==
Event	W	F	SF	QF	Round of 16	Round of 32	Round of 56	Q2	Q1
Singles	$412,000	$242,800	$125,000	$57,440	$28,730	$16,340	$11,725	$6,880	$3,580
Doubles*	$120,300	$67,630	$37,180	$18,750	$10,620	$7,120	—	—	—

_{*per team}

== Singles main-draw entrants ==
=== Seeds ===
Country	Player	Rank^{†}	Seed
ESP	Paula Badosa	4	1
	Aryna Sabalenka	5	2
USA	Jessica Pegula	6	3
GRE	Maria Sakkari	7	4
USA	Coco Gauff	8	5
FRA	Caroline Garcia	10	6
	Daria Kasatkina	11	7
	Veronika Kudermetova	12	8
CZE	Barbora Krejčiková	14	9
SUI	Belinda Bencic	15	10
BRA	Beatriz Haddad Maia	16	11
LAT	Jeļena Ostapenko	17	12
USA	Madison Keys	18	13
USA	Danielle Collins	19	14
	Ekaterina Alexandrova	20	15
CZE	Petra Kvitová	21	16

^{†} Rankings are as of 10 October 2022.

=== Other entrants ===
The following players received wildcards into the main draw:

- (Canada) Eugenie Bouchard
- (Mexico) Fernanda Contreras Gómez
- (Croatia) Donna Vekić

The following player received entry into the singles main draw with a protected ranking:

- (Canada) Bianca Andreescu

The following players received entry from the qualifying draw:

- (Italy) Elisabetta Cocciaretto
- (United States) Lauren Davis
- (United States) Kayla Day
- (United States) Caroline Dolehide
- (Poland) Magdalena Fręch
- (Czech Republic) Linda Fruhvirtová
- (Canada) Rebecca Marino
- (United States) Asia Muhammad

The following players received entry as lucky losers:

- Elina Avanesyan
- (Japan) Nao Hibino
- (Brazil) Laura Pigossi

=== Withdrawals ===
Before the tournament

- (United States) Amanda Anisimova → replaced by (United States) Sloane Stephens
- (United States) Sofia Kenin → replaced by (United States) Ann Li
- (Estonia) Anett Kontaveit → replaced by Anna Kalinskaya
- (Croatia) Petra Martić → replaced by (Poland) Magda Linette
- (Spain) Garbiñe Muguruza → replaced by (Ukraine) Marta Kostyuk
- (United States) Shelby Rogers → replaced by (Japan) Nao Hibino
- (United States) Alison Riske-Amritraj → replaced by (Brazil) Laura Pigossi
- (China) Zhang Shuai → replaced by Elina Avanesyan
- (China) Zheng Qinwen → replaced by (Czech Republic) Tereza Martincová

== Doubles main-draw entrants ==
=== Seeds ===
Country	Player	Country	Player	Rank^{1}	Seed
CZE	Barbora Krejčíková	CZE	Kateřina Siniaková	3	1
	Veronika Kudermetova	BEL	Elise Mertens	7	2
USA	Coco Gauff	USA	Jessica Pegula	11	3
CAN	Gabriela Dabrowski	MEX	Giuliana Olmos	15	4
UKR	Lyudmyla Kichenok	LAT	Jeļena Ostapenko	19	5
USA	Nicole Melichar-Martinez	AUS	Ellen Perez	28	6
USA	Desirae Krawczyk	NED	Demi Schuurs	30	7
CHN	Xu Yifan	CHN	Yang Zhaoxuan	37	8

- ^{1} Rankings as of 10 October 2022.

=== Other entrants ===
The following pairs received wildcards into the doubles main draw:

- Victoria Azarenka / (United States) Bethanie Mattek-Sands
- (Mexico) Fernanda Contreras Gómez / (Colombia) Camila Osorio
- ~~(United States) Caroline Dolehide~~ / ~~(United States) CoCo Vandeweghe~~

The following pairs received entry as alternates:

- (Italy) Elisabetta Cocciaretto / (Italy) Martina Trevisan
- (Ukraine) Marta Kostyuk / (Czech Republic) Tereza Martincová

=== Withdrawals ===
- (Hungary) Anna Bondár / (Belgium) Kimberley Zimmermann → replaced by (Ukraine) Nadiia Kichenok / (Belgium) Kimberley Zimmermann
- (United States) Caroline Dolehide / (United States) CoCo Vandeweghe → replaced by (Ukraine) Marta Kostyuk / (Czech Republic) Tereza Martincová
- (United States) Asia Muhammad / (China) Zhang Shuai → replaced by (Italy) Elisabetta Cocciaretto / (Italy) Martina Trevisan
