= 2022 Guadalajara Open Akron – Singles =

Singles
- 2022 Guadalajara Open Akron

Final
- Champion: (United States) Jessica Pegula
- Runner-up: (Greece) Maria Sakkari
- Score: 6–2, 6–3

Details
- Draw: 56 (3WC, 8Q)
- Seeds: 16

Events
Singles	Doubles
- Guadalajara Open Akron

Jessica Pegula defeated Maria Sakkari in the final, 6–2, 6–3 to win the women's singles tennis title at the 2022 Guadalajara Open. Pegula saved three match points en route to her first WTA 1000 title (in the second round against Elena Rybakina), and successively defeated four major champions during the tournament.

This was the first time that Guadalajara hosted a WTA 1000–level event, having hosted the previous year's WTA Finals.

== Seeds ==
The top eight seeds received a bye into the second round.

1. (Spain) Paula Badosa (second round, retired)
2. Aryna Sabalenka (second round)
3. (United States) Jessica Pegula (champion)
4. (Greece) Maria Sakkari (final)
5. (United States) Coco Gauff (quarterfinals)
6. (France) Caroline Garcia (third round)
7. Daria Kasatkina (third round)
8. Veronika Kudermetova (quarterfinals)
9. (Czech Republic) Barbora Krejčíková (first round)
10. (Switzerland) Belinda Bencic (second round)
11. (Brazil) Beatriz Haddad Maia (first round)
12. (Latvia) Jeļena Ostapenko (third round)
13. (United States) Madison Keys (third round)
14. (United States) Danielle Collins (third round)
15. Ekaterina Alexandrova (first round)
16. (Czech Republic) Petra Kvitová (second round)

Click on the seed number of a player to go to their draw section.

== Draw ==
Key

- Q = Qualifier
- WC = Wild card
- LL = Lucky loser
- Alt = Alternate
- ITF = ITF entry
- PR = Protected ranking
- SR = Special ranking
- SE = Special exempt
- JE = Junior exempt
- JR = Junior Accelerator Programme entrant
- CO = College Accelerator Programme entrant
- NG = Next Gen Accelerator Program entrant
- w/o = Walkover
- r = Retired
- d = Defaulted

=== Finals ===
Quarterfinals
Victoria Azarenka	7^{7}	4	6
5	(United States) Coco Gauff	6^{2}	6	3
3	(United States) Jessica Pegula	6	6
(United States) Sloane Stephens	2	2
8	Veronika Kudermetova	1	7	4
4	(Greece) Maria Sakkari	6	5	6
Anna Kalinskaya	2^{r}
(Czech Republic) Marie Bouzková	5

Semifinals
Victoria Azarenka	6^{3}	1
3	(United States) Jessica Pegula	7^{7}	6
4	(Greece) Maria Sakkari	7	6
(Czech Republic) Marie Bouzková	5	4

Final
3	(United States) Jessica Pegula	6	6
4	(Greece) Maria Sakkari	2	3

=== Top half ===
==== Section 1 ====
First round
V Azarenka	6	6
LL	E Avanesyan	4	2
(Australia) A Tomljanović	6	6
WC	(Mexico) F Contreras Gómez	2	1
(Poland) M Linette	3	3
13	(United States) M Keys	6	6
11	(Brazil) B Haddad Maia	5	2
(Czech Republic) K Siniaková	7	6
LL	(Japan) N Hibino	4	3
(Italy) M Trevisan	6	6
Q	(Italy) E Cocciaretto	6	6
A Potapova	2	1

Second round
1	(Spain) P Badosa	2	0^{r}
V Azarenka	6	0
(Australia) A Tomljanović	6	4	3
13	(United States) M Keys	3	6	6
(Czech Republic) K Siniaková	0	6	3
(Italy) M Trevisan	6	4	6
Q	(Italy) E Cocciaretto	6^{1}	3
5	(United States) C Gauff	7^{7}	6

Third round
V Azarenka	6	6^{4}	6
13	(United States) M Keys	4	7^{7}	1
(Italy) M Trevisan	0	3
5	(United States) C Gauff	6	6

Quarterfinals
V Azarenka	7^{7}	4	6
5	(United States) C Gauff	6^{2}	6	3

==== Section 2 ====
First round
(Kazakhstan) E Rybakina	7^{7}	6
(Czech Republic) Ka Plíšková	6^{5}	2
PR	(Canada) B Andreescu	6	6
(Switzerland) J Teichmann	2	4
(United States) B Pera	3	5
16	(Czech Republic) P Kvitová	6	7
10	(Switzerland) B Bencic	7	6^{10}	6
(Canada) L Fernandez	5	7^{12}	3
(United States) S Stephens	6	6
Q	(Czech Republic) L Fruhvirtová	0	2
(United States) A Li	2	6^{2}
Q	(Canada) R Marino	6	7^{7}

Second round
3	(United States) J Pegula	2	6	7^{10}
(Kazakhstan) E Rybakina	6	3	6^{8}
PR	(Canada) B Andreescu	3	6	6
16	(Czech Republic) P Kvitová	6	2	0
10	(Switzerland) B Bencic	4	4
(United States) S Stephens	6	6
Q	(Canada) R Marino	7^{7}	3	6^{5}
6	(France) C Garcia	6^{2}	6	7^{7}

Third round
3	(United States) J Pegula	6	6
PR	(Canada) B Andreescu	4	4
(United States) S Stephens	7^{8}	7
6	(France) C Garcia	6^{6}	5

Quarterfinals
3	(United States) J Pegula	6	6
(United States) S Stephens	2	2

=== Bottom half ===
==== Section 3 ====
First round
WC	(Croatia) D Vekić	6	6
LL	(Brazil) L Pigossi	4	1
WC	(Canada) E Bouchard	7	6
Q	(United States) K Day	5	3
Q	(United States) L Davis	1	3
12	(Latvia) J Ostapenko	6	6
14	(United States) D Collins	6	6
Q	(United States) C Dolehide	4	1
Q	(Poland) M Fręch	6	6
(Kazakhstan) Y Putintseva	3	4
(Ukraine) M Kostyuk	6	6
A Sasnovich	1	3

Second round
8	V Kudermetova	6	7
WC	(Croatia) D Vekić	4	5
WC	(Canada) E Bouchard	5	6	1
12	(Latvia) J Ostapenko	7	2	6
14	(United States) D Collins	6	6
Q	(Poland) M Fręch	3	4
(Ukraine) M Kostyuk	4	4
4	(Greece) M Sakkari	6	6

Third round
8	V Kudermetova	6	6
12	(Latvia) J Ostapenko	4	4
14	(United States) D Collins	7	3	3
4	(Greece) M Sakkari	5	6	6

Quarterfinals
8	V Kudermetova	1	7	4
4	(Greece) M Sakkari	6	5	6

==== Section 4 ====
First round
(China) L Zhu	3	6	6
(France) A Cornet	6	3	4
Q	(United States) A Muhammad	3	2
(Belgium) E Mertens	6	6
A Kalinskaya	6	6
9	(Czech Republic) B Krejčíková	3	4
15	E Alexandrova	4	6^{8}
(Colombia) C Osorio	6	7^{10}
(Czech Republic) M Bouzková	6	7
(Czech Republic) T Martincová	2	5
L Samsonova	6	7
(Estonia) K Kanepi	1	5

Second round
7	D Kasatkina	6	6
(China) L Zhu	1	2
(Belgium) E Mertens	4	6	5
A Kalinskaya	6	0	7
(Colombia) C Osorio	3	1
(Czech Republic) M Bouzková	6	6
L Samsonova	6	2	6
2	A Sabalenka	4	6	2

Third round
7	D Kasatkina	2	6	3
A Kalinskaya	6	2	6
(Czech Republic) M Bouzková	0	7	6
L Samsonova	6	5	3

Quarterfinals
A Kalinskaya	2^{r}
(Czech Republic) M Bouzková	5

== Qualifying ==
=== Seeds ===
1. (Czech Republic) Linda Fruhvirtová (qualified)
2. (Canada) Rebecca Marino (qualified)
3. (United States) Lauren Davis (qualified)
4. (Austria) Julia Grabher (first round)
5. (Italy) Elisabetta Cocciaretto (qualified)
6. (Brazil) Laura Pigossi (qualifying competition, lucky loser)
7. (United States) Alycia Parks (first round)
8. (Poland) Magdalena Fręch (qualified)
9. (United States) Elizabeth Mandlik (first round)
10. (Russia) Elina Avanesyan (qualifying competition, lucky loser)
11. (Japan) Nao Hibino (qualifying competition, lucky loser)
12. (United States) CoCo Vandeweghe (qualifying competition, retired)
13. (Romania) Gabriela Lee (first round)
14. (Germany) Anna-Lena Friedsam (first round)
15. (Argentina) María Lourdes Carlé (first round)
16. (Brazil) Carolina Alves (qualifying competition)

=== Qualifiers ===
1. (Czech Republic) Linda Fruhvirtová
2. (Canada) Rebecca Marino
3. (United States) Lauren Davis
4. (United States) Kayla Day
5. (Italy) Elisabetta Cocciaretto
6. (United States) Asia Muhammad
7. (United States) Caroline Dolehide
8. (Poland) Magdalena Fręch

=== Lucky losers ===
1. (Brazil) Laura Pigossi
2. (Russia) Elina Avanesyan
3. (Japan) Nao Hibino

=== Draw ===
==== First qualifier ====
First round
1	(Czech Republic) Linda Fruhvirtová	6	6
(Ukraine) Nadiia Kichenok	1	1
WC	(Mexico) Lya Isabel Fernández Olivares	1	3
10	(Russia) Elina Avanesyan	6	6

Qualifying competition
1	(Czech Republic) Linda Fruhvirtová	7	6
10	(Russia) Elina Avanesyan	5	2

==== Second qualifier ====
First round
2	(Canada) Rebecca Marino	2	6	6
(United States) Sachia Vickery	6	2	1
(United States) Elvina Kalieva	6	6
15	(Argentina) María Lourdes Carlé	2	1

Qualifying competition
2	(Canada) Rebecca Marino	7	2	6
(United States) Elvina Kalieva	5	6	3

==== Third qualifier ====
First round
3	(United States) Lauren Davis	6	6
PR	(United States) Bethanie Mattek-Sands	2	4
(Japan) Eri Hozumi	5	3
11	(Japan) Nao Hibino	7	6

Qualifying competition
3	(United States) Lauren Davis	6	6
11	(Japan) Nao Hibino	4	1

==== Fourth qualifier ====
First round
4	(Austria) Julia Grabher	2	6	4
(United States) Kayla Day	6	4	6
(Australia) Jaimee Fourlis	2	4
12	(United States) CoCo Vandeweghe	6	6

Qualifying competition
(United States) Kayla Day	5	7	4
12	(United States) CoCo Vandeweghe	7	5	2^{r}

==== Fifth qualifier ====
First round
5	(Italy) Elisabetta Cocciaretto	6	6
(Canada) Carol Zhao	3	1
(Mexico) Renata Zarazúa	6	6
13	(Romania) Gabriela Lee	4	4

Qualifying competition
5	(Italy) Elisabetta Cocciaretto	6	6
(Mexico) Renata Zarazúa	4	4

==== Sixth qualifier ====
First round
6	(Brazil) Laura Pigossi	6	7^{10}
PR	(Russia) Varvara Flink	3	6^{8}
(United States) Asia Muhammad	7	6
9	(United States) Elizabeth Mandlik	5	2

Qualifying competition
6	(Brazil) Laura Pigossi	2	4
(United States) Asia Muhammad	6	6

==== Seventh qualifier ====
First round
7	(United States) Alycia Parks	4	6	4
(United States) Caroline Dolehide	6	3	6
(Norway) Ulrikke Eikeri	2	3
16	(Brazil) Carolina Alves	6	6

Qualifying competition
(United States) Caroline Dolehide	6	6
16	(Brazil) Carolina Alves	4	2

==== Eighth qualifier ====
First round
8	(Poland) Magdalena Fręch	7	6
(Kazakhstan) Anna Danilina	5	3
(United States) Danielle Lao	3	6	6
14	(Germany) Anna-Lena Friedsam	6	4	3

Qualifying competition
8	(Poland) Magdalena Fręch	6	6
(United States) Danielle Lao	4	2
