= 2024 National Bank Open – Women's doubles =

Women's doubles
- 2024 National Bank Open

Final
- Champions: (United States) Caroline Dolehide (United States) Desirae Krawczyk
- Runners-up: (Canada) Gabriela Dabrowski (New Zealand) Erin Routliffe
- Score: 7–6^{(7–2)}, 3–6, [10–7]

Details
- Draw: 28
- Seeds: 8

Events
| Singles | men | women |
| Doubles | men | women |
- National Bank Open

Caroline Dolehide and Desirae Krawczyk defeated Gabriela Dabrowski and Erin Routliffe in the final, 7–6^{(7–2)}, 3–6, [10–7] to win the women's doubles tennis title at the 2024 Canadian Open.

Shuko Aoyama and Ena Shibahara were the reigning champions, but Shibahara chose not to participate this year. Aoyama partnered Eri Hozumi, but lost in the first round to Guo Hanyu and Makoto Ninomiya.

== Seeds ==
The top four seeds received a bye into the second round.

1. (Canada) Gabriela Dabrowski / (New Zealand) Erin Routliffe (final)
2. (Ukraine) Lyudmyla Kichenok / (Latvia) Jeļena Ostapenko (second round)
3. (United States) Caroline Dolehide / (United States) Desirae Krawczyk (champions)
4. (Belgium) Elise Mertens / (United States) Asia Muhammad (second round)
5. (Netherlands) Demi Schuurs / (Brazil) Luisa Stefani (first round)
6. (Norway) Ulrikke Eikeri / (Australia) Ellen Perez (first round)
7. (United States) Sofia Kenin / (United States) Bethanie Mattek-Sands (semifinals)
8. (Spain) Cristina Bucșa / (China) Xu Yifan (first round)

== Draw ==
Key

- Q = Qualifier
- WC = Wild card
- LL = Lucky loser
- Alt = Alternate
- ITF = ITF entry
- PR = Protected ranking
- SR = Special ranking
- SE = Special exempt
- JE = Junior exempt
- JR = Junior Accelerator Programme entrant
- CO = College Accelerator Programme entrant
- NG = Next Gen Accelerator Program entrant
- w/o = Walkover
- r = Retired
- d = Defaulted

=== Finals ===
Semifinals
1 | (Canada) Gabriela Dabrowski (New Zealand) Erin Routliffe | 6 | 6
WC | (Canada) Bianca Fernandez (Canada) Leylah Fernandez | 2 | 4
3 | (United States) Caroline Dolehide (United States) Desirae Krawczyk | 6 | 3 | [10]
7 | (United States) Sofia Kenin (United States) Bethanie Mattek-Sands | 2 | 6 | [7]

Final
1 | (Canada) Gabriela Dabrowski (New Zealand) Erin Routliffe | 6^{2} | 6 | [7]
3 | (United States) Caroline Dolehide (United States) Desirae Krawczyk | 7^{7} | 3 | [10]

=== Top half ===
First round
(Poland) M Linette (United States) P Stearns | 7^{7} | 6
(Japan) M Uchijima (China) Y Yuan | 6^{5} | 4
(Hungary) T Babos (Ukraine) N Kichenok | 1 | 5
(Czech Republic) M Bouzková (Kazakhstan) A Danilina | 6 | 7
WC | (Canada) A Arseneault (Canada) M Kupres | 1 | 7^{7} | [10]
6 | (Norway) U Eikeri (Australia) E Perez | 6 | 6^{5} | [5]
(United States) Q Gleason (Brazil) I Martins | 4 | 4
(France) K Mladenovic (China) S Zhang | 6 | 6
(United Kingdom) H Dart (Denmark) C Tauson | 6 | 0 | [5]
(United States) C Harrison (United States) A Krueger | 3 | 6 | [10]
WC | (Canada) B Fernandez (Canada) L Fernandez | 6 | 6
5 | (Netherlands) D Schuurs (Brazil) L Stefani | 2 | 4

Second round
1 | (Canada) G Dabrowski (New Zealand) E Routliffe | 6^{0} | 7^{7} | [10]
(Poland) M Linette (United States) P Stearns | 7^{7} | 6^{3} | [5]
(Czech Republic) M Bouzková (Kazakhstan) A Danilina
WC | (Canada) A Arseneault (Canada) M Kupres | w/o
4 | (Belgium) E Mertens (United States) A Muhammad | 0 | 4
(France) K Mladenovic (China) S Zhang | 6 | 6
(United States) C Harrison (United States) A Krueger | 3 | 6 | [9]
WC | (Canada) B Fernandez (Canada) L Fernandez | 6 | 4 | [11]

Quarterfinals
1 | (Canada) G Dabrowski (New Zealand) E Routliffe | 3 | 6 | [10]
WC | (Canada) A Arseneault (Canada) M Kupres | 6 | 3 | [4]
(France) K Mladenovic (China) S Zhang | 5 | 7 | [10]
WC | (Canada) B Fernandez (Canada) L Fernandez | 7 | 5 | [12]

Semifinals
1 | (Canada) G Dabrowski (New Zealand) E Routliffe | 6 | 6
WC | (Canada) B Fernandez (Canada) L Fernandez | 2 | 4

=== Bottom half ===
First round
8 | (Spain) C Bucșa (China) Y Xu | 0 | 1
(Mexico) G Olmos (United States) J Pegula | 6 | 6
(United States) S Stephens (United States) T Townsend | 6 | 6
(Slovakia) T Mihalíková (United Kingdom) O Nicholls | 2 | 3
(China) H Guo (Japan) M Ninomiya | 7^{11} | 6
(Japan) S Aoyama (Japan) E Hozumi | 6^{9} | 3
7 | (United States) S Kenin (United States) B Mattek-Sands | 6 | 6
Alt | (France) C Paquet (United States) K Volynets | 0 | 0
L Samsonova (China) Y Wang | 6 | 3 | [10]
(United States) A Parks (Netherlands) B Schoofs | 4 | 6 | [5]
(China) X Jiang (Chinese Taipei) F-h Wu | 6 | 6
(Japan) M Kato (Indonesia) A Sutjiadi | 4 | 3

Second round
(Mexico) G Olmos (United States) J Pegula | 6 | 6
(United States) S Stephens (United States) T Townsend | 3 | 3
(China) H Guo (Japan) M Ninomiya | 6 | 3 | [7]
3 | (United States) C Dolehide (United States) D Krawczyk | 2 | 6 | [10]
7 | (United States) S Kenin (United States) B Mattek-Sands | 6 | 5 | [10]
L Samsonova (China) Y Wang | 3 | 7 | [6]
(China) X Jiang (Chinese Taipei) F-h Wu | 7^{9} | 4 | [10]
2 | (Ukraine) L Kichenok (Latvia) J Ostapenko | 6^{7} | 6 | [7]

Quarterfinals
(Mexico) G Olmos (United States) J Pegula | 6^{5} | 6^{6}
3 | (United States) C Dolehide (United States) D Krawczyk | 7^{7} | 7^{8}
7 | (United States) S Kenin (United States) B Mattek-Sands | 4 | 7^{10} | [10]
(China) X Jiang (Chinese Taipei) F-h Wu | 6 | 6^{8} | [1]

Semifinals
3 | (United States) C Dolehide (United States) D Krawczyk | 6 | 3 | [10]
7 | (United States) S Kenin (United States) B Mattek-Sands | 2 | 6 | [7]

== Seeded teams ==
The following are the seeded teams. Seedings are based on WTA rankings as of 29 July 2024.

| Country | Player | Country | Player | Rank^{1} | Seed |
|---|---|---|---|---|---|
| CAN | Gabriela Dabrowski | NZL | Erin Routliffe | 4 | 1 |
| UKR | Lyudmyla Kichenok | LAT | Jeļena Ostapenko | 31 | 2 |
| USA | Caroline Dolehide | USA | Desirae Krawczyk | 33 | 3 |
| BEL | Elise Mertens | USA | Asia Muhammad | 36 | 4 |
| NED | Demi Schuurs | BRA | Luisa Stefani | 40 | 5 |
| NOR | Ulrikke Eikeri | AUS | Ellen Perez | 40 | 6 |
| USA | Sofia Kenin | USA | Bethanie Mattek-Sands | 60 | 7 |
| ESP | Cristina Bucșa | CHN | Xu Yifan | 71 | 8 |

== Other entry information ==
=== Wild cards ===
- (Canada) Ariana Arseneault / (Canada) Mia Kupres
- (Canada) Bianca Fernandez / (Canada) Leylah Fernandez
- ~~(Canada) Rebecca Marino / (Canada) Marina Stakusic~~

=== Alternates ===
- (France) Chloé Paquet / (United States) Katie Volynets

=== Withdrawals ===
- (Canada) Rebecca Marino / (Canada) Marina Stakusic → replaced by (France) Chloé Paquet / (United States) Katie Volynets
