= 2023 Abierto Tampico =

- Date: 23–29 October
- Edition: 7th
- Category: WTA 125
- Prize money: $115,000
- Surface: Hard
- Location: Tampico, Mexico
- Venue: Centro Libanés Mexicano de Tampico

Champions

Singles
- (United States) Emina Bektas

Doubles
- Kamilla Rakhimova / Anastasia Tikhonova
← 2022 ·	Abierto Tampico	· 2024 →

The 2023 Abierto Tampico was a professional women's tennis tournament played on outdoor hard courts. It was the seventh edition of the tournament and second as a WTA 125 tournament, which was part of the 2023 WTA 125 season. It took place at the Centro Libanés Mexicano de Tampico in Tampico, Mexico, between 23 and 29 October 2023.

== Singles entrants ==
=== Seeds ===
Country	Player	Rank^{1}	Seed
USA	Caroline Dolehide	44	1
USA	Peyton Stearns	48	2
~~USA~~	~~Taylor Townsend~~	~~80~~	~~3~~
	Anna Kalinskaya	83	4
	Kamilla Rakhimova	84	5
USA	Emina Bektas	104	6
USA	Katie Volynets	109	7
COL	Emiliana Arango	118	8

- ^{1} Rankings as of 16 October 2023.

=== Other entrants ===
The following players received a wildcard into the singles main draw:

- (Mexico) Fernanda Contreras Gómez
- (United States) Caroline Dolehide
- (Mexico) Victoria Rodríguez
- (Mexico) Ana Sofía Sánchez
- (United States) Peyton Stearns
- ~~(Mexico) Marcela Zacarías~~

The following player received entry into the main draw through protected ranking:

- (Australia) Ajla Tomljanović

The following players received entry from the qualifying draw:

- (United States) Jessie Aney
- (Mexico) Jessica Hinojosa Gómez
- (Mexico) Daniela Martínez Guerrero

The following players received entry into the main draw as lucky losers:

- (Mexico) Daniela Schekaiban
- Alina Zolotareva

=== Withdrawals ===
Before the tournament

- (United States) Taylor Townsend → replaced by (Mexico) Daniela Schekaiban

== Doubles entrants ==
=== Seeds ===
Country	Player	Country	Player	Rank^{1}	Seed
USA	Sabrina Santamaria	GBR	Heather Watson	183	1
MEX	Fernanda Contreras Gómez	USA	Angela Kulikov	233	2
	Kamilla Rakhimova		Anastasia Tikhonova	257	3
USA	Jessie Aney	USA	Sofia Sewing	291	4

- ^{1} Rankings as of 16 October 2023.

=== Other entrants ===
The following pair received a wildcard into the doubles main draw:

- (Mexico) Andrea Fernandez Villarreal / (Mexico) Daniela Schekaiban
- (Mexico) Daniela Martínez Guerrero / (Mexico) Fernanda Regalado Macías

== Champions ==
=== Singles ===
- (United States) Emina Bektas def. Anna Kalinskaya, 6–3, 3–6, 7–6^{(7–3)}

=== Doubles ===
- Kamilla Rakhimova / Anastasia Tikhonova def. (United States) Sabrina Santamaria / (United Kingdom) Heather Watson, 7–6^{(7–5)}, 6–2
