= 2022 Guadalajara Open Akron – Doubles =

Doubles
- 2022 Guadalajara Open Akron

Final
- Champions: (Australia) Storm Sanders (Brazil) Luisa Stefani
- Runners-up: (Kazakhstan) Anna Danilina (Brazil) Beatriz Haddad Maia
- Score: 7–6^{(7–4)}, 6–7^{(2–7)}, [10–8]

Details
- Draw: 28 (3WC)
- Seeds: 8

Events
Singles	Doubles
Guadalajara Open Akron	· 2023 →

Storm Sanders and Luisa Stefani defeated Anna Danilina and Beatriz Haddad Maia in the final, 7–6^{(7–4)}, 6–7^{(2–7)}, [10–8] to win the doubles tennis title at the 2022 Guadalajara Open.

This was the first time that Guadalajara hosted a WTA 1000-level event, having hosted the previous year's WTA Finals.

== Seeds ==
The top four seeds received a bye into the second round.

1. (Czech Republic) Barbora Krejčíková / (Czech Republic) Kateřina Siniaková (semifinals)
2. Veronika Kudermetova / (Belgium) Elise Mertens (quarterfinals, withdrew)
3. (United States) Coco Gauff / (United States) Jessica Pegula (quarterfinals)
4. (Canada) Gabriela Dabrowski / (Mexico) Giuliana Olmos (quarterfinals)
5. (Ukraine) Lyudmyla Kichenok / (Latvia) Jeļena Ostapenko (quarterfinals)
6. (United States) Nicole Melichar-Martinez / (Australia) Ellen Perez (second round)
7. (United States) Desirae Krawczyk / (Netherlands) Demi Schuurs (second round)
8. (China) Xu Yifan / (China) Yang Zhaoxuan (semifinals)

== Draw ==
=== Key ===
- Q = Qualifier
- WC = Wild card
- LL = Lucky loser
- Alt = Alternate
- SE = Special exempt
- PR = Protected ranking
- ITF = ITF entry
- JE = Junior exempt
- w/o = Walkover
- r = Retired
- d = Defaulted
- SR = Special ranking

=== Finals ===
Semifinals
1	(Czech Republic) Barbora Krejčíková (Czech Republic) Kateřina Siniaková	2	7	[7]
(Kazakhstan) Anna Danilina (Brazil) Beatriz Haddad Maia	6	5	[10]
8	(China) Xu Yifan (China) Yang Zhaoxuan	7	4	[5]
PR	(Australia) Storm Sanders (Brazil) Luisa Stefani	5	6	[10]

Final
(Kazakhstan) Anna Danilina (Brazil) Beatriz Haddad Maia	6^{4}	7^{7}	[8]
PR	(Australia) Storm Sanders (Brazil) Luisa Stefani	7^{7}	6^{2}	[10]

=== Top half ===
First round
(United States) K Christian; L Marozava	2	6	[3]
(Poland) A Rosolska (New Zealand) E Routliffe	6	3	[10]
(Czech Republic) L Fruhvirtová (Estonia) K Kanepi	6	6
WC	(Mexico) F Contreras Gómez (Colombia) C Osorio	2	3
(Chinese Taipei) H-c Chan (Czech Republic) L Hradecká	4	1
5	(Ukraine) L Kichenok (Latvia) J Ostapenko	6	6
A Sasnovich (China) L Zhu	7	6
(United States) S Chang (Indonesia) A Sutjiadi	5	2
(Chile) A Guarachi (Slovenia) A Klepač	1	6	[5]
(Kazakhstan) A Danilina (Brazil) B Haddad Maia	6	3	[10]
Alt	(Ukraine) M Kostyuk (Czech Republic) T Martincová	3	6	[6]
7	(United States) D Krawczyk (Netherlands) D Schuurs	6	3	[10]

Second round
1	(Czech Republic) B Krejčíková (Czech Republic) K Siniaková	6	6
(Poland) A Rosolska (New Zealand) E Routliffe	1	2
(Czech Republic) L Fruhvirtová (Estonia) K Kanepi	6	1	[5]
5	(Ukraine) L Kichenok (Latvia) J Ostapenko	3	6	[10]
3	(United States) C Gauff (United States) J Pegula	7^{7}	7
A Sasnovich (China) L Zhu	6^{1}	5
(Kazakhstan) A Danilina (Brazil) B Haddad Maia	3	7	[10]
7	(United States) D Krawczyk (Netherlands) D Schuurs	6	5	[8]

Quarterfinals
1	(Czech Republic) B Krejčíková (Czech Republic) K Siniaková	3	7	[10]
5	(Ukraine) L Kichenok (Latvia) J Ostapenko	6	5	[3]
3	(United States) C Gauff (United States) J Pegula	4	5
(Kazakhstan) A Danilina (Brazil) B Haddad Maia	6	7

Semifinals
1	(Czech Republic) B Krejčíková (Czech Republic) K Siniaková	2	7	[7]
(Kazakhstan) A Danilina (Brazil) B Haddad Maia	6	5	[10]

=== Bottom half ===
First round
8	(China) Y Xu (China) Z Yang	6	6
A Kalinskaya (Kazakhstan) Y Putintseva	1	3
A Potapova; Y Sizikova	6	6
(France) A Cornet (Switzerland) J Teichmann	4	3
(United States) S Rogers (United States) S Santamaria	5	2
(Ukraine) N Kichenok (Belgium) K Zimmermann	7	6
6	(United States) N Melichar-Martinez (Australia) E Perez	6	6
WC	V Azarenka (United States) B Mattek-Sands	3	2
PR	(Australia) S Sanders (Brazil) L Stefani	6	6
Alt	(Italy) E Cocciaretto (Italy) M Trevisan	4	4
(Japan) S Aoyama (Japan) E Hozumi	6	6
(Norway) U Eikeri (Slovakia) T Mihalíková	3	4

Second round
8	(China) Y Xu (China) Z Yang	6	6
A Potapova; Y Sizikova	3	3
(Ukraine) N Kichenok (Belgium) K Zimmermann	0	3
4	(Canada) G Dabrowski (Mexico) G Olmos	6	6
6	(United States) N Melichar-Martinez (Australia) E Perez	6^{3}	6	[8]
PR	(Australia) S Sanders (Brazil) L Stefani	7^{7}	4	[10]
(Japan) S Aoyama (Japan) E Hozumi	2	6	[6]
2	V Kudermetova (Belgium) E Mertens	6	3	[10]

Quarterfinals
8	(China) Y Xu (China) Z Yang	7	5	[10]
4	(Canada) G Dabrowski (Mexico) G Olmos	5	7	[8]
PR	(Australia) S Sanders (Brazil) L Stefani	w/o
2	V Kudermetova (Belgium) E Mertens

Semifinals
8	(China) Y Xu (China) Z Yang	7	4	[5]
PR	(Australia) S Sanders (Brazil) L Stefani	5	6	[10]
