= Tereza Mihalíková =

Slovak tennis player (born 1998)

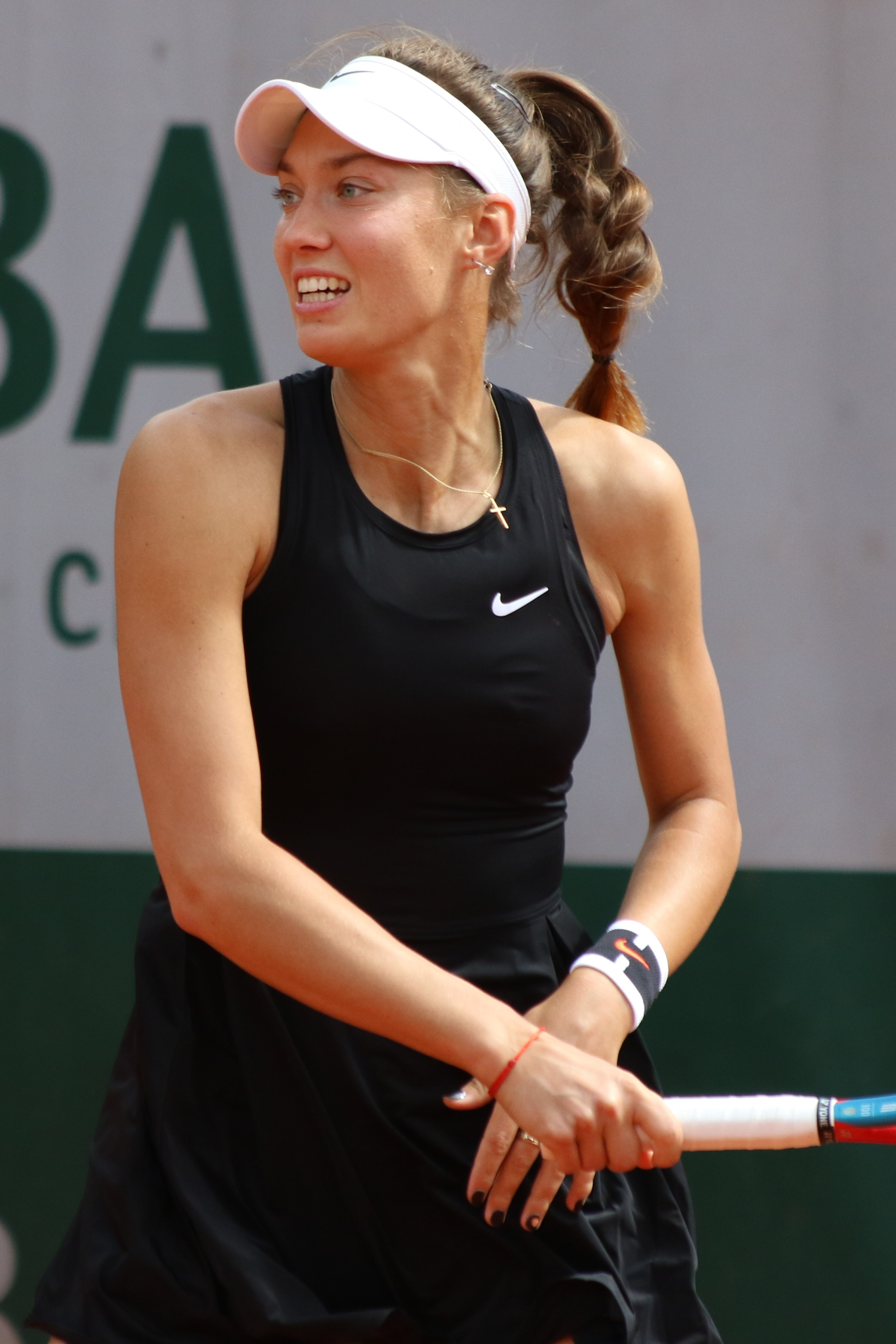
- Mihalíková at the 2022 French Open
- Country (sports): Slovakia
- Born: 2 June 1998 (age 28) Topoľčany, Slovakia
- Height: 1.79 m (5 ft 10 in)
- Plays: Right-handed (two-handed backhand)
- Prize money: US$ 1,262,792

Singles
- Career record: 177–144
- Career titles: 0 WTA, 8 ITF
- Highest ranking: No. 349 (11 June 2018)

Grand Slam singles results
- Australian Open: Q1 (2016)

Doubles
- Career record: 298–208
- Career titles: 3
- Highest ranking: No. 21 (16 February 2026)
- Current ranking: No. 28 (3 August 2026)

Grand Slam doubles results
- Australian Open: 3R (2023)
- French Open: 3R (2025, 2026)
- Wimbledon: 3R (2023, 2024)
- US Open: 3R (2024)

Grand Slam mixed doubles results
- Australian Open: 2R (2026)
- French Open: 1R (2025, 2026)
- Wimbledon: 2R (2025, 2026)

Team competitions
- Fed Cup: F (2024), record 10–5
Medal record
Women's tennis
Representing Slovakia
European Youth Summer Olympic Festival
Gold medal – first place	2013 Utrecht	Girls' doubles
- Last updated on: 3 August 2026.

Tereza Mihalíková (Slovak pronunciation: [ˈtereza ˈmiɦaliːkɔʋaː]; born 2 June 1998) is a Slovak tennis player. She has a career-high doubles ranking of No. 21 by the WTA, achieved on 16 February 2026.

Mihalíková has won three doubles titles on the WTA Tour and three WTA Challenger doubles titles, along with eight singles and 19 doubles titles on the ITF Circuit.

She was a successful junior, a former junior No. 4, and won the Australian Open in both events. First, in 2015, she won the girls' singles event by defeating Katie Swan in the final. Her doubles title came a year later, when, alongside Anna Kalinskaya, they finally defeated Dayana Yastremska and Anastasia Zarycká. She is also a three time major finalist in doubles: 2014 US Open and Australian Open and Wimbledon in 2015.

While still playing mostly in tournaments of the ITF Circuit in singles, she had her breakthrough in doubles by winning her first career title in 2021 and debuting in the top 100.

== Career ==
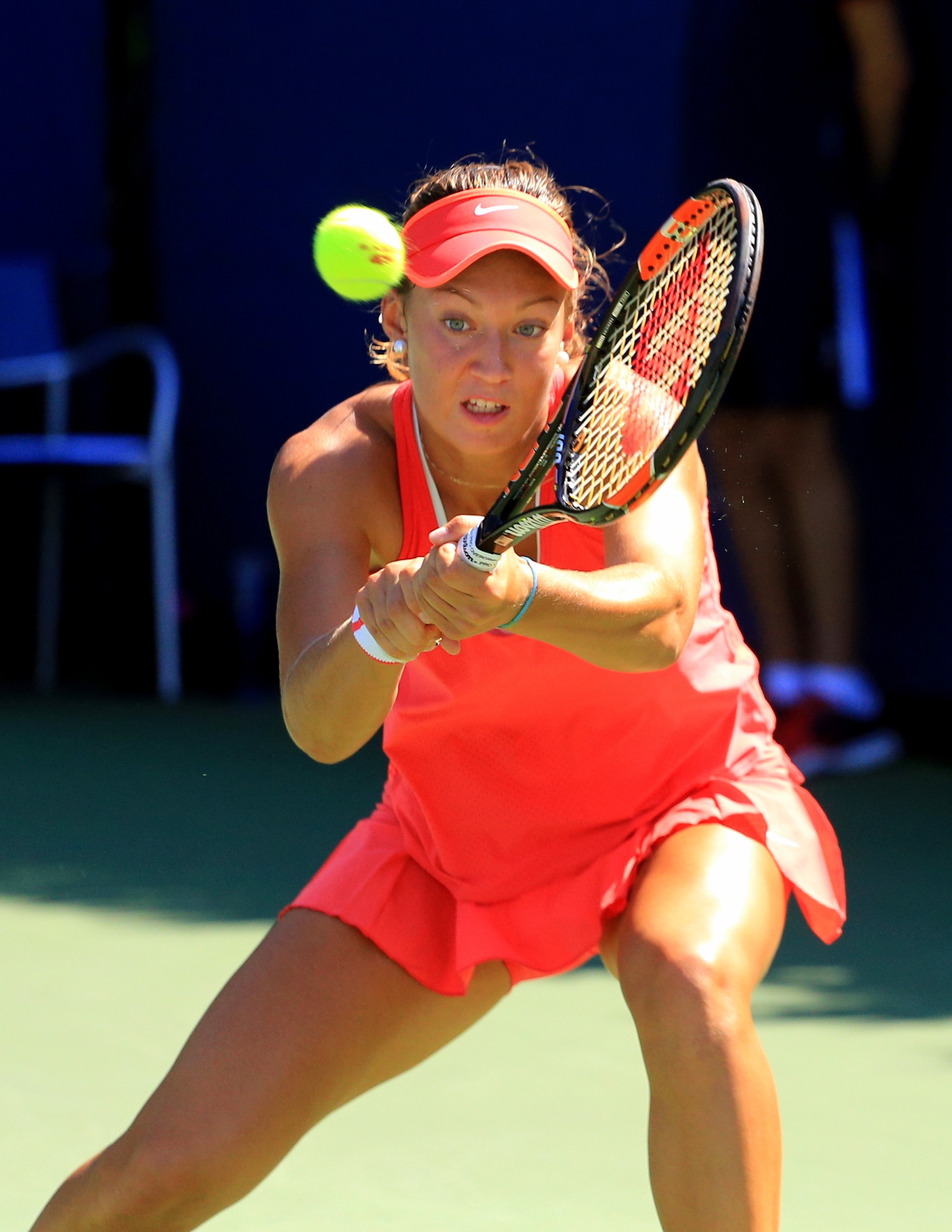
Mihalíková in the junior tournament of the 2015 US Open.

=== 2014–2016: Juniors ===
In 2014, Mihalíková reached the final of the girls' doubles tournament at the US Open, partnering with Vera Lapko. She entered doubles competition at the 2015 Australian Open, again alongside Lapko. They lost their quarterfinal match to the eventual champions, Miriam Kolodziejová and Markéta Vondroušová. But she won the singles competition, defeating British Katie Swan in the final. At the 2016 Australian Open, Mihalíková won the girls' doubles event with Anna Kalinskaya and ended runner-up in the girls' singles event, losing the final to Vera Lapko.

==== Grand Slam performance ====
Singles:

- Australian Open: W (2015)
- French Open: 2R (2014)
- Wimbledon: 3R (2015)
- US Open: 2R (2014)

Doubles:

- Australian Open: W (2016)
- French Open: 2R (2014)
- Wimbledon: F (2015)
- US Open: F (2014)

Mihalíková was also a member of the Slovak Junior Fed Cup team (U16). Together with Viktória Kužmová and Tamara Kupková, she reached the final in 2014, when they lost to the team of the United States (CiCi Bellis, Tornado Alicia Black, Sofia Kenin).

=== 2021: Progress in doubles: WTA Tour title and top 100 ===
In June, Mihalíková reached her first WTA Challenger final at the Bol Ladies Open. Together with Ekaterine Gorgodze, she lost to the pair of Aliona Bolsova and Katarzyna Kawa. The following month, she reached another Challenger final, at the Swedish Open alongside Kamilla Rakhimova. Just like in the previous final, she lost in three sets.

Mihalíková reached her first WTA Tour doubles final at the Portorož Open in September. Partnering with Anna Kalinskaya, she defeated Aleksandra Krunić and Lesley Pattinama Kerkhove, in three sets.

In December, she was successful in her third attempt in a WTA 125 final, winning the title at the Open Angers alongside Greet Minnen, after beating Vera Zvonareva and Monica Niculescu. These results pushed her into the top 100 for the first time.

=== 2022: Two WTA 125 doubles titles ===
Alongside Ulrikke Eikeri, Mihalíková won the doubles title at the Contrexéville Open in July, with a win in the final over Han Xinyun and Alexandra Panova.

In October, oartnering with Aldila Sutjiadi, she won the WTA 125 Abierto Tampico in October, defeating Ashlyn Krueger and Elizabeth Mandlik in the final.

=== 2024: Two WTA 250 finals ===
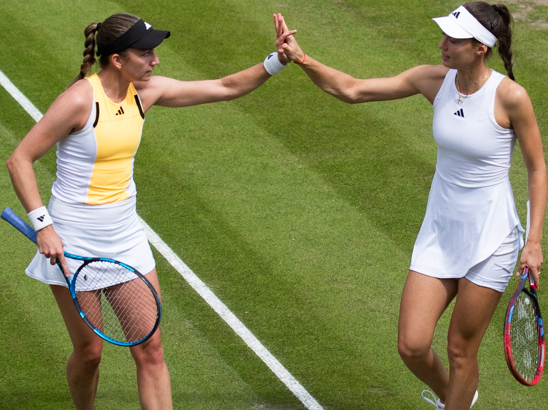
Mihalíková with Olivia Nicholls (left) at the 2024 Birmingham Classic

Mihalíková was runner-up at the Transylvania Open alongside Harriet Dart and at the Rosmalen Open partnering with Olivia Nicholls.

Playing with Nicholls, she reached back-to-back quarterfinals at the China Open and at the next WTA 1000, the Wuhan Open.

In November, Mihalíková partnered Viktória Hrunčáková to win the deciding doubles match against the U.S. pair of Taylor Townsend and Ashlyn Krueger that saw Slovakia qualify for the Billie Jean King Cup quarterfinals. The pair then repeated the feat in the semifinals by overcoming Nicholls and Heather Watson as Slovakia defeated Great Britain to make it into the final for the first time since 2002.

=== 2025: First WTA 500 title ===
With her partner Olivia Nicholls, Mihalíková reached her first WTA 1000 final at the Indian Wells Open with an upset win over fifth seeds Hsieh Su-wei and Zhang Shuai. They lost the final to Asia Muhammad and Demi Schuurs.

In May, Mihalíková and Nicholls were runners-up at the WTA 125 Trophée Clarins, losing to Irina Khromacheva and Fanny Stollár in the final.

Alongside Nicholls, she won her first WTA 500 title at the Berlin Open in June, defeating top seeds Sara Errani and Jasmine Paolini in the final which went to a deciding champions tiebreak.

=== 2026: Queen's Club title ===
In February, Mihalíková and Nicholls.reached the final at the Abu Dhabi Open, losing in a deciding champions tiebreak to Ekaterina Alexandrova and Maya Joint. They won their second title as a pairing at the Queen's Club Championships in June, defeating Leylah Fernandez and Laura Siegemund in the final. In August, Mihalíková and Nicholls made it through to the semifinals at the Canadian Open, losing to top seeds Kateřina Siniaková and Zhang Shuai.

== Doubles performance timeline ==
Key
W	F	SF	QF	#R	RR	Q#	P#	DNQ	A	Z#	PO	G	S	B	NMS	NTI	P	NH

(W) winner; (F) finalist; (SF) semifinalist; (QF) quarterfinalist; (#R) rounds 4, 3, 2, 1; (RR) round-robin stage; (Q#) qualification round; (P#) preliminary round; (DNQ) did not qualify; (A) absent; (Z#) Davis/Fed Cup Zonal Group (with number indication) or (PO) play-off; (G) gold, (S) silver or (B) bronze Olympic/Paralympic medal; (NMS) not a Masters tournament; (NTI) not a Tier I tournament; (P) postponed; (NH) not held; (SR) strike rate (events won / competed); (W–L) win–loss record.
To avoid confusion and double counting, these charts are updated at the conclusion of a tournament or when the player's participation has ended.

Current through the 2025 Dubai Tennis Championships

Tournament	2017	2018	2019	2020	2021	2022	2023	2024	2025	2026	SR	W–L	Win %
Grand Slam tournaments
Australian Open	A	A	A	A	A	A	3R	1R	1R	2R	0 / 4	3–4	43%
French Open	A	A	A	A	A	1R	1R	2R	3R	3R	0 / 5	5–5	50%
Wimbledon	A	A	A	NH	A	2R	3R	3R	1R	1R	0 / 5	5–5	50%
US Open	A	A	A	A	A	2R	1R	3R	1R		0 / 4	3–4	43%
Win–loss	0–0	0–0	0–0	0–0	0–0	2–3	4–4	5–4	2–4	3–3	0 / 18	16–18	47%
National representation
Billie Jean King Cup	A	A	G2	A	A	A	A	F			0 / 1	2–1	67%
WTA 1000 tournaments
Qatar Open (Note: The first Premier 5 event of the year has switched back and forth between the Dubai Tennis Championships and the Qatar Ladies Open since 2009. Dubai was classified as a Premier 5 event from 2009 to 2011 before being succeeded by Doha for the 2012–2014 period. In 2015, Dubai regained its Premier 5 status while Doha was demoted to Premier status. The Premier 5 tournaments were reclassified as WTA 1000 tournaments in 2021.)	NTI	A	NTI	A	NTI	A	NTI	2R	1R	QF	0 / 3	2–3	40%
Dubai Championships	A	NTI	A	NTI	A	NTI	1R	A	2R	1R	0 / 3	1–3	25%
Indian Wells Open	A	A	A	NH	A	1R	A	A	F	1R	0 / 3	5–2	71%
Miami Open	A	A	A	NH	A	1R	2R	1R	2R	2R	0 / 5	3–5	38%
Madrid Open	A	A	A	NH	A	QF	1R	1R	1R	1R	0 / 5	2–5	29%
Italian Open	A	A	A	A	A	A	1R	A	1R	1R	0 / 3	0–3	0%
Canadian Open	A	A	A	NH	A	1R	1R	1R			0 / 3	0–3	0%
Cincinnati Open	A	A	A	A	A	A	2R	QF			0 / 2	3–2	60%
Guadalajara Open	NH					1R	2R	NTI			0 / 2	1–2	33%
China Open	A	A	A	NH			2R	QF			0 / 2	3–2	60%
Wuhan Open	A	A	A	NH				QF			0 / 1	2–1	67%
Career statistics
Tournaments	1	0	0	0	6	19	28	29			Career total: 83		
Titles	0	0	0	0	1	0	0	0			Career total: 1		
Finals	0	0	0	0	1	1	1	2			Career total: 3		
Overall win–loss	1–1	0–0	0–1	0–0	4–6	15–20	21–28	32–29			1 / 83	73–85	46%
Year-end ranking	366	206	207	190	109	48	54	42	28		$378,987		

== WTA Tour finals ==
=== Doubles: 9 (3 titles, 6 runner-ups) ===
Legend WTA 1000 (0–1) WTA 500 (2–1) WTA 250 (1–4)	Finals by surface Hard (1–4) Grass (2–2)	Finals by setting Outdoor (3–5) Indoor (0–1)

Result	W–L	Date	Tournament	Tier	Surface	Partner	Opponents	Score
Win	1–0	Sep 2021	Portorož Open, Slovenia	WTA 250	Hard	(Russia) Anna Kalinskaya	(Serbia) Aleksandra Krunić (Netherlands) Lesley Pattinama Kerkhove	4–6, 6–2, [12–10]
Loss	1–1	Sep 2022	Portorož Open, Slovenia	WTA 250	Hard	(Spain) Cristina Bucșa	(Ukraine) Marta Kostyuk (Czech Republic) Tereza Martincová	4–6, 0–6
Loss	1–2	Jun 2023	Rosmalen Open, Netherlands	WTA 250	Grass	(Slovakia) Viktória Hrunčáková	(Japan) Shuko Aoyama (Japan) Ena Shibahara	3–6, 3–6
Loss	1–3	Feb 2024	Transylvania Open, Romania	WTA 250	Hard (i)	(United Kingdom) Harriet Dart	(United States) Caty McNally (United States) Asia Muhammad	3–6, 4–6
Loss	1–4	Jun 2024	Rosmalen Open, Netherlands	WTA 250	Grass	(United Kingdom) Olivia Nicholls	(Estonia) Ingrid Neel (Netherlands) Bibiane Schoofs	6–7^{(6–8)}, 3–6
Loss	1–5	Mar 2025	Indian Wells Open, United States	WTA 1000	Hard	(United Kingdom) Olivia Nicholls	(United States) Asia Muhammad (Netherlands) Demi Schuurs	2–6, 6–7^{(4–7)}
Win	2–5	June 2025	Berlin Open, Germany	WTA 500	Grass	(United Kingdom) Olivia Nicholls	(Italy) Sara Errani (Italy) Jasmine Paolini	4–6, 6–2, [10–6]
Loss	2–6	Feb 2026	Abu Dhabi Open, U.A.E.	WTA 500	Hard	(United Kingdom) Olivia Nicholls	Ekaterina Alexandrova (Australia) Maya Joint	6–3, 6–7^{(5–7)}, [8–10]
Win	3–6	Jun 2026	Queen's Club Championships, UK	WTA 500	Grass	(United Kingdom) Olivia Nicholls	(Canada) Leylah Fernandez (Germany) Laura Siegemund	6–3, 6–7^{(4–7)}, [10–5]

== WTA 125 finals ==
=== Doubles: 8 (3 titles, 5 runner-ups) ===
Result	W–L	Date	Tournament	Surface	Partner	Opponents	Score
Loss	0–1	Jun 2021	Bol Ladies Open, Croatia	Clay	(Georgia (country)) Ekaterine Gorgodze	(Spain) Aliona Bolsova (Poland) Katarzyna Kawa	1–6, 6–4, [6–10]
Loss	0–2	Jul 2021	Swedish Open, Sweden	Clay	(Russia) Kamilla Rakhimova	(Sweden) Mirjam Björklund (Switzerland) Leonie Küng	7–5, 3–6, [5–10]
Win	1–2	Dec 2021	Angers Open, France	Hard (i)	(Belgium) Greet Minnen	(Romania) Monica Niculescu (Russia) Vera Zvonareva	4–6, 6–1, [10–8]
Win	2–2	Jul 2022	Contrexéville Open, France	Clay	(Norway) Ulrikke Eikeri	(China) Han Xinyun; Alexandra Panova	7–6^{(8)}, 6–2
Win	3–2	Oct 2022	Abierto Tampico, Mexico	Hard	(Indonesia) Aldila Sutjiadi	(United States) Ashlyn Krueger (United States) Elizabeth Mandlik	7–5, 6–2
Loss	3–3	Mar 2024	Charleston Pro, US	Hard	(Italy) Sara Errani	(Australia) Olivia Gadecki (United Kingdom) Olivia Nicholls	2–6, 1–6
Loss	3–4	May 2025	Clarins Open, France	Clay	(United Kingdom) Olivia Nicholls	Irina Khromacheva (Hungary) Fanny Stollár	6–4, 6–7^{(5)}, [5–10]
Loss	3–5	Apr 2026	Catalonia Open, Spain	Clay	(United Kingdom) Olivia Nicholls	Elena Pridankina (China) Tang Qianhui	1–6, 3–6

== ITF Circuit finals ==
=== Singles: 12 (8 titles, 4 runner-ups) ===
Legend $25,000 tournaments (0–1) $15,000 tournaments (2–3) $10,000 tournaments (6–0)	Finals by surface Hard (8–2) Clay (0–1) Grass (0–1)

Result	W–L	Date	Tournament	Tier	Surface	Opponent	Score
Win	1–0	Apr 2015	ITF Cairo, Egypt	10,000	Hard	(Bosnia and Herzegovina) Dea Herdželaš	7–5, 6–3
Win	2–0	Aug 2015	ITF Sharm El Sheikh, Egypt	10,000	Hard	(Australia) Sara Tomic	6–2, 6–0
Win	3–0	Feb 2016	ITF Sharm El Sheikh, Egypt	10,000	Hard	(Russia) Varvara Flink	6–1, 6–4
Win	4–0	Apr 2016	ITF Manama, Bahrain	10,000	Hard	(Russia) Anna Kalinskaya	7–5, 6–1
Win	5–0	Aug 2016	ITF Sharm El Sheikh, Egypt	10,000	Hard	(Montenegro) Ana Veselinović	2–6, 6–3, 6–4
Win	6–0	Sep 2016	ITF Sharm El Sheikh, Egypt	10,000	Hard	(Zimbabwe) Valeria Bhunu	6–3, 7–6^{(3)}
Loss	6–1	Jul 2017	ITF Sharm El Sheikh, Egypt	15,000	Hard	(Russia) Vera Zvonareva	6–1, 6–7^{(4)}, 5–7
Loss	6–2	Aug 2017	ITF Târgu Jiu, Romania	15,000	Clay	(Romania) Ilona Georgiana Ghioroaie	3–6, 6–3, 6–7^{(7)}
Win	7–2	Oct 2017	ITF Sharm El Sheikh, Egypt	15,000	Hard	(Slovenia) Nastja Kolar	6–2, 6–4
Win	8–2	Mar 2018	ITF Bhopal, India	15,000	Hard	(United Kingdom) Emily Webley-Smith	6–1, 5–7, 6–0
Loss	8–3	Mar 2018	ITF Manama, Bahrain	15,000	Hard	(Slovenia) Nastja Kolar	4–6, 2–6
Loss	8–4	Nov 2018	ITF Muzaffarnagar, India	25,000	Grass	(Serbia) Natalija Kostić	2–6, 1–3 ret.

=== Doubles: 35 (19 titles, 16 runner-ups) ===
Legend $100,000 tournaments (1–0) $60,000 tournaments (2–2) $25,000 tournaments (9–9) $15,000 tournaments (5–3) $10,000 tournaments (2–2)	Finals by surface Hard (14–13) Clay (4–3) Grass (1–0)

Result	W–L	Date	Tournament	Tier	Surface	Partner	Opponents	Score
Loss	0–1	Apr 2015	ITF Cairo, Egypt	10,000	Hard	(Slovakia) Barbara Kötelesová	(France) Marine Partaud (Hungary) Naomi Totka	2–6, 5–7
Loss	0–2	Oct 2015	ITF Sharm El Sheikh, Egypt	10,000	Hard	(Belgium) Vicky Geurinckx	(United Kingdom) Emily Arbuthnott (United Kingdom) Lisa Whybourn	3–6, 0–6
Win	1–2	Apr 2016	ITF Manama, Bahrain	10,000	Hard	(Russia) Anna Kalinskaya	(Germany) Katharina Hering (Belgium) Kimberley Zimmermann	7–5, 6–3
Win	2–2	May 2016	Empire Slovak Open, Slovakia	100,000	Clay	(Russia) Anna Kalinskaya	(Russia) Evgeniya Rodina (Latvia) Anastasija Sevastova	6–1, 7–6^{(4)}
Loss	2–3	Jun 2016	ITF Namangan, Uzbekistan	25,000	Hard	(Russia) Veronika Kudermetova	(Russia) Ksenia Lykina (Russia) Polina Monova	6–3, 3–6, [5–10]
Win	3–3	Jul 2016	ITF Amarante, Portugal	10,000	Hard	(Portugal) Inês Murta	(Switzerland) Jessica Crivelletto (Greece) Despina Papamichail	7–6^{(5)}, 6–3
Loss	3–4	Oct 2016	ITF Toowoomba, Australia	25,000	Hard	(Brazil) Gabriela Cé	(Hungary) Dalma Gálfi (Slovakia) Viktória Kužmová	4–6, 6–7^{(4)}
Loss	3–5	Mar 2017	ITF Sharm El Sheikh, Egypt	15,000	Hard	(Bulgaria) Julia Terziyska	(Russia) Olga Doroshina (Russia) Polina Monova	w/o
Win	4–5	Mar 2017	ITF Sharm El Sheikh, Egypt	15,000	Hard	(Russia) Anna Morgina	(China) Li Yuenu (China) Meng Ran	2–6, 6–4, [10–5]
Win	5–5	Apr 2017	ITF Cairo, Egypt	15,000	Clay	(Georgia (country)) Mariam Bolkvadze	(Serbia) Bojana Marinković (Greece) Despina Papamichail	7–6^{(7)}, 6–3
Win	6–5	May 2017	ITF Hammamet, Tunisia	15,000	Clay	(Australia) Naiktha Bains	(Italy) Francesca Bullani (Italy) Veronica Napolitano	4–6, 6–1, [10–5]
Loss	6–6	Sep 2017	Royal Cup, Montenegro	25,000	Clay	(Slovakia) Chantal Škamlová	(Czech Republic) Petra Krejsová (Czech Republic) Jesika Malečková	2–6, 3–6
Win	7–6	Nov 2017	Pune Championships, India	25,000	Hard	(Romania) Jaqueline Cristian	(Chinese Taipei) Lee Pei-chi (Russia) Yana Sizikova	4–6, 6–3, [10–7]
Loss	7–7	Mar 2018	ITF Bhopal, India	15,000	Hard	(Montenegro) Ana Veselinović	(India) Kanika Vaidya (Netherlands) Rosalie van der Hoek	2–1 ret.
Win	8–7	May 2018	ITF Tbilisi, Georgia	25,000	Hard	(Brazil) Laura Pigossi	(Belarus) Sviatlana Pirazhenka (Netherlands) Erika Vogelsang	6–4, 6–1
Loss	8–8	Jul 2018	ITF Setúbal, Portugal	25,000	Hard	(Bulgaria) Julia Terziyska	(France) Mathilde Armitano (France) Elixane Lechemia	7–6^{(5)}, 3–6, [11–13]
Loss	8–9	Aug 2018	ITF Koksijde, Belgium	25,000	Clay	(Bosnia and Herzegovina) Dea Herdželaš	(Hungary) Anna Bondár (Romania) Raluca Șerban	3–6, 0–6
Win	9–9	Aug 2018	ITF Almaty, Kazakhstan	25,000	Hard	(Ukraine) Valeriya Strakhova	(Russia) Polina Monova (Russia) Yana Sizikova	1–6, 6–2, [10–5]
Win	10–9	Oct 2018	Lagos Open, Nigeria	25,000	Hard	(Bulgaria) Julia Terziyska	(France) Estelle Cascino (Israel) Deniz Khazaniuk	6–7^{(4)}, 6–2, [10–5]
Win	11–9	Mar 2019	Clay Court International, Australia	W25	Clay	(Australia) Naiktha Bains	(Australia) Destanee Aiava (Australia) Ellen Perez	4–6, 6–2, [10–4]
Loss	11–10	Mar 2019	Clay Court International 2, Australia	W25	Clay	(Australia) Naiktha Bains	(Australia) Alison Bai (Australia) Jaimee Fourlis	2–6, 2–6
Win	12–10	May 2019	ITF Jerusalem, Israel	W25	Hard	(Belarus) Yuliya Hatouka	(United Kingdom) Samantha Murray (Greece) Despina Papamichail	2–6, 6–4, [10–8]
Loss	12–11	Oct 2019	Bendigo International, Australia	W60	Hard	(United Kingdom) Naiktha Bains	(Australia) Maddison Inglis (Australia) Kaylah McPhee	6–3, 2–6, [2–10]
Loss	12–12	Nov 2019	Playford International, Australia	W60	Hard	(United Kingdom) Naiktha Bains	(Australia) Storm Sanders (United States) Asia Muhammad	3–6, 4–6
Loss	12–13	Jan 2020	ITF Monastir, Tunisia	W15	Hard	(Serbia) Bojana Marinković	(India) Zeel Desai (Russia) Anastasia Tikhonova	6–7^{(4)}, 7–5, [5–10]
Win	13–13	Jan 2020	ITF Monastir, Tunisia	W15	Hard	(United Kingdom) Jodie Burrage	(France) Mallaurie Noël (Finland) Oona Orpana	6–1, 6–2
Win	14–13	Jan 2020	ITF Monastir, Tunisia	W15	Hard	(Belarus) Yuliya Hatouka	(Kazakhstan) Gozal Ainitdinova (Kazakhstan) Yekaterina Dmitrichenko	6–4, 6–2
Win	15–13	Feb 2020	Trnava Indoor, Slovakia	W25	Hard (i)	(Hungary) Anna Bondár	(Russia) Amina Anshba (Czech Republic) Anastasia Dețiuc	6–4, 6–4
Win	16–13	Mar 2020	ITF Mildura, Australia	W25	Grass	(Australia) Abbie Myers	(Australia) Arina Rodionova (New Zealand) Erin Routliffe	6–3, 6–2
Win	17–13	Jan 2021	ITF Hamburg, Germany	W25	Hard (i)	(Hungary) Anna Bondár	(France) Amandine Hesse (Belgium) Kimberley Zimmermann	6–4, 6–4
Loss	17–14	Mar 2021	ITF Manacor, Spain	W25	Hard	(Hungary) Anna Bondár	(Hungary) Réka Luca Jani (Belgium) Lara Salden	4–6, 5–7
Win	18–14	Oct 2021	Las Vegas Open, US	W60	Hard	(United States) Quinn Gleason	(United Kingdom) Tara Moore (United States) Emina Bektas	7–6^{(5)}, 7–5
Win	19–14	Oct 2021	Rancho Santa Fe Open, US	W60	Hard	(Poland) Katarzyna Kawa	(Chinese Taipei) Liang En-shuo (Canada) Rebecca Marino	6–3, 4–6, [10–6]
Loss	19–15	Jan 2022	ITF Manacor, Spain	W25	Hard	(Czech Republic) Linda Nosková	(Mexico) Fernanda Contreras (Spain) Andrea Lázaro García	1–6, 4–6
Loss	19–16	Feb 2022	ITF Manacor, Spain	W25	Hard	(Czech Republic) Linda Nosková	(Mexico) Fernanda Contreras (Spain) Andrea Lázaro García	1–6, 6–3, [6–10]

=== Junior Grand Slam tournament finals ===
==== Singles: 2 (1 title, 1 runner-up) ====
Result	Year	Tournament	Surface	Opponent	Score
Win	2015	Australian Open	Hard	(United Kingdom) Katie Swan	6–1, 6–4
Loss	2016	Australian Open	Hard	(Belarus) Vera Lapko	3–6, 4–6

==== Doubles: 3 (1 title, 2 runner-ups) ====
Result	Year	Tournament	Surface	Partner	Opponents	Score
Loss	2014	US Open	Hard	(Belarus) Vera Lapko	(Turkey) İpek Soylu (Switzerland) Jil Teichmann	7–5, 2–6, [7–10]
Loss	2015	Wimbledon	Grass	(Belarus) Vera Lapko	(Hungary) Dalma Gálfi (Hungary) Fanny Stollár	3–6, 2–6
Win	2016	Australian Open	Hard	(Russia) Anna Kalinskaya	(Ukraine) Dayana Yastremska (Ukraine) Anastasia Zarytska	6–1, 6–1

=== ITF Junior Circuit finals ===
==== Singles: 5 (3 titles, 2 runner-ups) ====
Legend
Grade 1 / B1 (0–1)
Grade 3 (1–0)
Grade 4 (2–0)
Grade 5 (0–1)

Result	W–L	Date	Tournament	Tier	Surface	Opponent	Score
Loss	0–1	Jun 2013	Podgorica Open, Montenegro	Grade 5	Clay	(Croatia) Martina Basic	1–6, 6–3, 5–7
Win	1–1	Jun 2013	ITF Melnyka, Ukraine	Grade 4	Clay	(Ukraine) Anastasiya Fedoryshyn	7–6^{(7–1)}, 6–3
Win	2–1	Aug 2013	Triglav Open, Slovenia	Grade 4	Clay	(Slovenia) Manca Pislak	2–6, 6–4, 7–6^{(7–5)}
Win	3–1	Jun 2014	Bytom Cup, Poland	Grade 3	Clay	(Denmark) Emilie Francati	6–0, 7–5
Loss	3–2	Aug 2015	Prince George's County International, United States	Grade 1	Hard	(Russia) Anna Kalinskaya	4–6, 6–7^{(3–7)}

==== Doubles: 14 (8 titles, 6 runner-ups) ====
Legend
Grade A (0–1)
Grade 1 / B1 (3–1)
Grade 2 (1–2)
Grade 3 (1–0)
Grade 4 (3–0)
Grade 5 (0–2)

Result	W–L	Date	Tournament	Tier	Surface	Partner	Opponents	Score
Loss	0–1	Sep 2012	Mayor's Cup, Lithuania	Grade 5	Clay	(Russia) Kseniia Becker	(Estonia) Elisa Mai Koonik (Estonia) Tatjana Vorobjova	w/o
Win	1–1	Feb 2013	Otocec Cup, Slovenia	Grade 4	Carpet	(Czech Republic) Nina Holanova	(Slovenia) Pia Brglez (Croatia) Ena Kajevic	6–2, 6–2
Loss	1–2	Jun 2013	Podgorica Cup, Montenegro	Grade 5	Clay	(Russia) Kseniia Becker	(United Kingdom) Georgina Axon (United Kingdom) Holly Hutchinson	2–6, 4–6
Win	2–2	Jun 2013	ITF Melnyka, Ukraine	Grade 4	Clay	(Ukraine) Anastasiya Fedoryshyn	(Ukraine) Anna Bogoslavets (Ukraine) Maryna Veksler	6–2, 6–3
Win	3–2	Aug 2013	Triglav Open, Slovenia	Grade 4	Clay	(Czech Republic) Barbora Miklova	(Slovenia) Zala Dovnik (Slovenia) Nika Kozar	6–1, 6–1
Win	4–2	Sep 2013	Aphrodite Cup, Cyprus	Grade 3	Hard	(United Kingdom) Gabriella Taylor	(Russia) Anna Iakovleva (Russia) Aleksandra Pospelova	6–3, 2–6, [10–3]
Win	5–2	Apr 2014	Plovdiv Cup, Bulgaria	Grade 2	Clay	(Slovakia) Viktória Kužmová	(Russia) Anastasia Gasanova (Belarus) Ulyana Grib	6–2, 6–1
Loss	5–3	Apr 2014	Slovakia Cup	Grade 2	Clay	(Russia) Aleksandra Pospelova	(Slovakia) Viktória Kužmová (Slovakia) Kristína Schmiedlová	4–6, 4–6
Loss	5–4	Jul 2014	Pilsen Wilson Cup, Czech Republic	Grade 2	Clay	(Czech Republic) Tereza Kolarova	(Slovakia) Jana Jablonovska (Czech Republic) Miriam Kolodziejová	3–6, 5–7
Loss	5–5	Dec 2014	Orange Bowl, US	Grade A	Clay	(Czech Republic) Miriam Kolodziejová	(United States) CiCi Bellis (Czech Republic) Markéta Vondroušová	5–7, 6–2, [4–10]
Win	6–5	Jan 2015	Traralgon International, Australia	Grade 1	Hard	(Belarus) Vera Lapko	(Ukraine) Olga Fridman (Russia) Elina Nepliy	7–5, 7–5
Win	7–5	Mar 2015	Perin Memorial, Croatia	Grade 1	Clay	(Russia) Aleksandra Pospelova	(Romania) Georgia Crăciun (Romania) Oana Gavrila	6–0, 2–6, [10–7]
Win	8–5	Aug 2015	Prince George's County International, US	Grade 1	Hard	(Russia) Anna Kalinskaya	(Belarus) Vera Lapko (Belarus) Iryna Shymanovich	6–1, 6–4
Loss	8–6	Dec 2015	Bradenton International, US	Grade 1	Clay	(Hungary) Dalma Gálfi	(United States) Sofia Kenin (United States) Ingrid Neel	3–6, 1–6

== Fed Cup/Billie Jean King Cup ==
Legend
World Group / Finals round robin (4–2)
World Group playoffs / Finals Qualifying round (3–1)
World Group 2 (0–1)
World Group 2 playoffs / Finals playoffs (0–1)
Zone Group round robin / Playoffs (3–0)

=== Doubles (10–5) ===
Edition	Round	Date	Location	Against	Surface	Partner	Opponents	W/L	Score
2016	WG2 PO	Apr 2016	Bratislava (SVK)	Canada	Clay (i)	Jana Čepelová	Sharon Fichman; Charlotte Robillard-Millette	L	3–6, 6–0, [8–10]
2019	WG2	Feb 2019	Riga (LAT)	Latvia	Hard (i)	Anna Karolína Schmiedlová	Diāna Marcinkēviča; Jeļena Ostapenko	L	2–6, 3–6
2020–21	F RR	Nov 2021	Prague (CZE)	Spain	Hard (i)	Viktória Kužmová	Sara Sorribes Tormo; Carla Suárez Navarro	L	6–4, 2–6, [7–10]
2020–21	F RR	Nov 2021	Prague (CZE)	United States	Hard (i)	Viktória Kužmová	Caroline Dolehide; CoCo Vandeweghe	W	6–2, 6–7^{(5)}, [12–10]
2022	F RR	Nov 2022	Glasgow (GBR)	Australia	Hard (i)	Viktória Hrunčáková	Ellen Perez; Storm Sanders	W	2–6, 6–3, [10–6]
2022	F RR	Nov 2022	Glasgow (GBR)	Belgium	Hard (i)	Viktória Hrunčáková	Elise Mertens; Kirsten Flipkens	L	0–6, 3–6
2023	F QR	Apr 2023	Bratislava (SVK)	(Italy) Latvia	Hard (i)	Viktória Hrunčáková	Martina Trevisan; Elisabetta Cocciaretto	L	4–6, 6–4, 5–7
2024	F QR	Apr 2024	Bratislava (SVK)	Slovenia	Hard (i)	Viktória Hrunčáková	Pia Lovrič; Ela Nala Milić	W	6–1, 2–6, [10–6]
2024	F R1	Nov 2022	Málaga (ESP)	United States	Hard (i)	Viktória Hrunčáková	Ashlyn Krueger; Taylor Townsend	W	6–3, 3–6, [10–8]
2024	F SF	Nov 2022	Málaga (ESP)	(United Kingdom) Great Britain	Hard (i)	Viktória Hrunčáková	Olivia Nicholls; Heather Watson	W	6–2, 6–2
2025	F QR	Apr 2025	Bratislava (SVK)	Denmark	Hard (i)	Viktória Hrunčáková	Laura Brunkel; Emilie Francati	W	7–6^{(4)}, 5–7, 6–1
2025	F QR	Apr 2025	Bratislava (SVK)	United States	Hard (i)	Mia Pohánková	Desirae Krawczyk; Asia Muhammad	W	3–0, ret.
2026	ZG RR	Apr 2024	Oeiras (POR)	Serbia	Clay	Viktória Hrunčáková	Aleksandra Krunić; Natalija Senić	W	6–4, 6–4
2026	ZG RR	Apr 2024	Oeiras (POR)	Lithuania	Clay	Viktória Hrunčáková	Andrė Lukošiūtė; Justina Mikulskytė	W	6–1, 6–3
2026	ZG RR	Apr 2024	Oeiras (POR)	Croatia	Clay	Viktória Hrunčáková	Lucija Ćirić Bagarić; Tara Würth	W	6–2, 7–6^{(5)}
