= Elisabetta Cocciaretto =

Italian tennis player (born 2001)

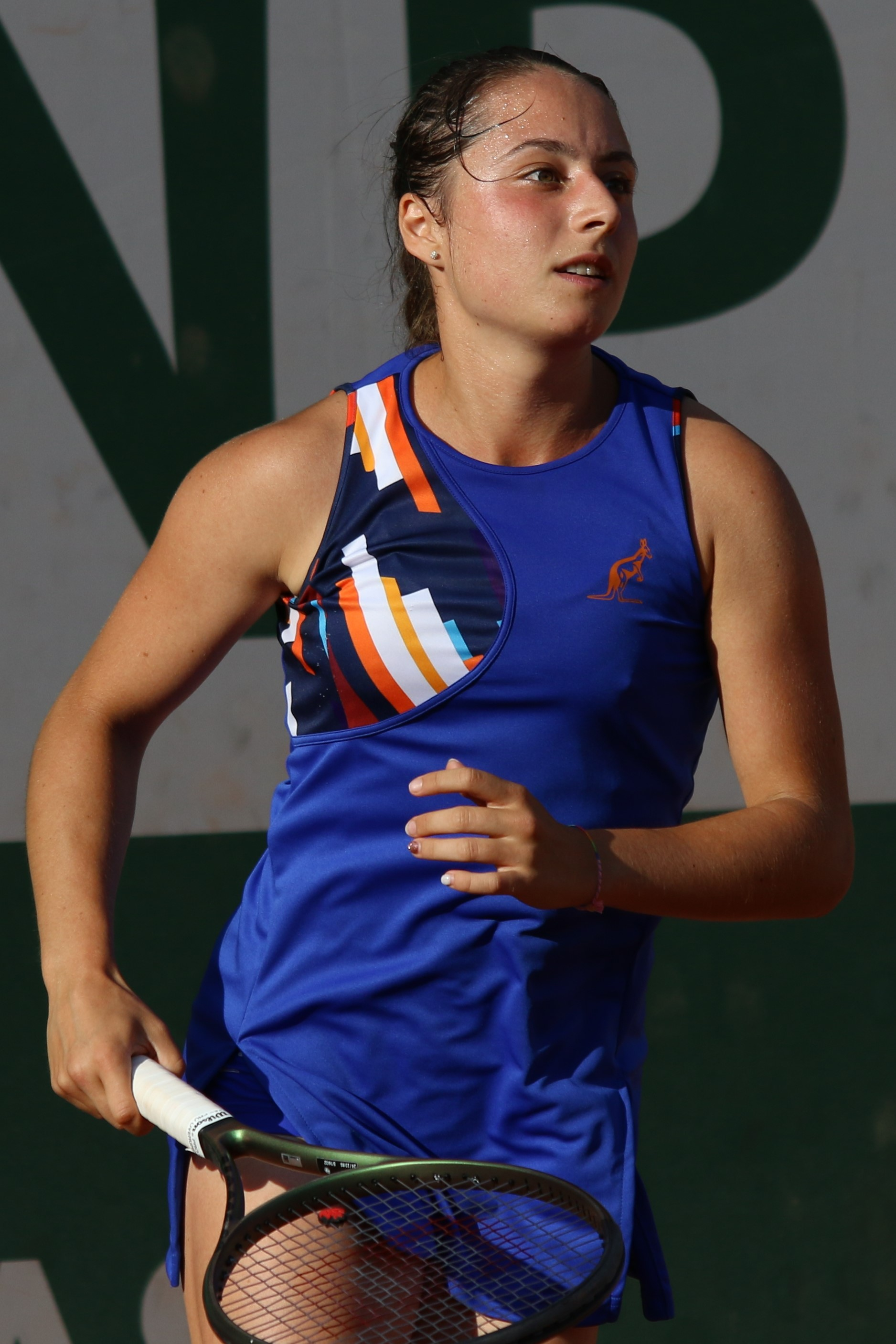
- Cocciaretto at the 2022 French Open
- Country (sports): Italy
- Born: 25 January 2001 (age 25) Ancona, Italy
- Height: 1.66 m (5 ft 5 in)
- Plays: Right-handed (two-handed backhand)
- Coach: Fausto Scolari
- Prize money: US$ 4,140,133

Singles
- Career record: 238–157
- Career titles: 2
- Highest ranking: No. 29 (21 August 2023)
- Current ranking: No. 67 (14 September 2026)

Grand Slam singles results
- Australian Open: 2R (2024)
- French Open: 4R (2024)
- Wimbledon: 3R (2023, 2025)
- US Open: 2R (2024)

Other tournaments
- Olympic Games: 1R (2024)

Doubles
- Career record: 30–58
- Career titles: 1 WTA Challenger
- Highest ranking: No. 107 (27 January 2025)
- Current ranking: No. 316 (14 September 2026)

Grand Slam doubles results
- Australian Open: 2R (2025)
- French Open: 1R (2023, 2026)
- Wimbledon: 2R (2022)
- US Open: 1R (2023, 2024, 2025)

Other doubles tournaments
- Olympic Games: 1R (2024)

Team competitions
- BJK Cup: W (2024, 2025), record 11–7
- Last updated on: 14 September 2026.

Elisabetta Cocciaretto (Italian pronunciation: [elizaˈbɛtta kottʃaˈretto]; born 25 January 2001) is an Italian professional tennis player. She has been ranked by the WTA as high as No. 29 in singles, achieved on 21 August 2023, and No. 107 in doubles, which she attained on 27 January 2025. Cocciaretto has won two singles titles, at the 2023 Ladies Open Lausanne and at the 2026 Hobart International.

She made her debut for the senior Italy Fed Cup team in 2018 at 17 years old. She was a member of the Italian squad which won the Billie Jean King Cup in 2024 and 2025 editions.

== Early life and background ==
Cocciaretto was born in Ancona to Piero Cocciaretto and Jessica Marcozzi. Her father played amateur tennis in his youth. She began playing tennis at the age of five, attending free classes at the Circolo Tennis in Porto San Giorgio. Her tennis idols were Roger Federer and Caroline Wozniacki.

== Junior years ==
Cocciaretto reached the semifinals of the 2018 Australian Open girls' singles tournament, but lost to eventual champion Liang En-shuo. On 5 February 2018, she achieved a career-high ITF junior combined ranking of No. 17.

At the 2018 Summer Youth Olympics, she reached the second round in singles.

== Professional ==
=== 2019: WTA Tour debut ===
In May 2019, Cocciaretto made her WTA Tour debut as a wildcard at the Italian Open, where she lost to Amanda Anisimova in the first round. In July, she qualified for her first WTA 250 at the Palermo Ladies Open, but lost again in the first round, to third seed Viktória Hrunčáková.

=== 2020: Major debut, WTA Tour quarterfinal & WTA 125 final ===
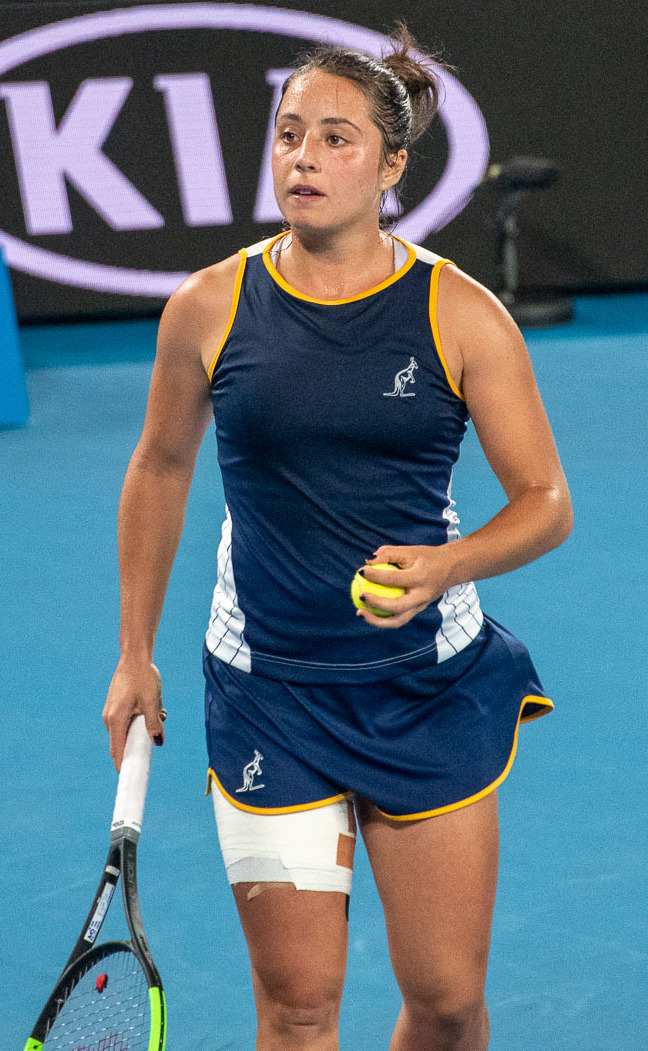
Cocciaretto at the 2020 Australian Open

In January, Cocciaretto qualified for her first major main draw at the Australian Open, defeating Bibiane Schoofs, Francesca Di Lorenzo, and Tereza Martincová in qualifying, but lost to 17th-seeded Angelique Kerber in the first round.

She reached her first WTA Tour quarterfinal in August in Palermo, defeating Polona Hercog and sixth seed Donna Vekić, before losing to fourth seed Anett Kontaveit. She also reached the doubles final in Palermo with compatriot Martina Trevisan, but they lost to Arantxa Rus and Tamara Zidanšek.

Cocciaretto reached her first WTA 125 final, seeded second, at the Sparta Prague Open, defeating Dalila Jakupović, Daniela Seguel, Bibiane Schoofs, Georgina García Pérez, Anna Karolína Schmiedlová and Nadia Podoroska, before losing to Kristína Kučová.

=== 2021: First WTA Tour semifinal, injury hiatus ===
In January 2021, Cocciaretto once again qualified for the Australian Open, but lost to Mona Barthel in the first round. After qualifying for the Abierto Zapopan, Cocciaretto advanced to her first tour semifinal, defeating Wang Xiyu, Nadia Podoroska, and Lauren Davis, before losing to wildcard Eugenie Bouchard. In May, she entered her first French Open as a lucky loser, but lost to Ana Bogdan in the first round. Following her first-round exit at the Budapest Grand Prix, Cocciaretto's season ended was cut short by a knee injury, for which she underwent surgery.

=== 2022: WTA 125 title, Wimbledon, US Open & top 100 debuts ===
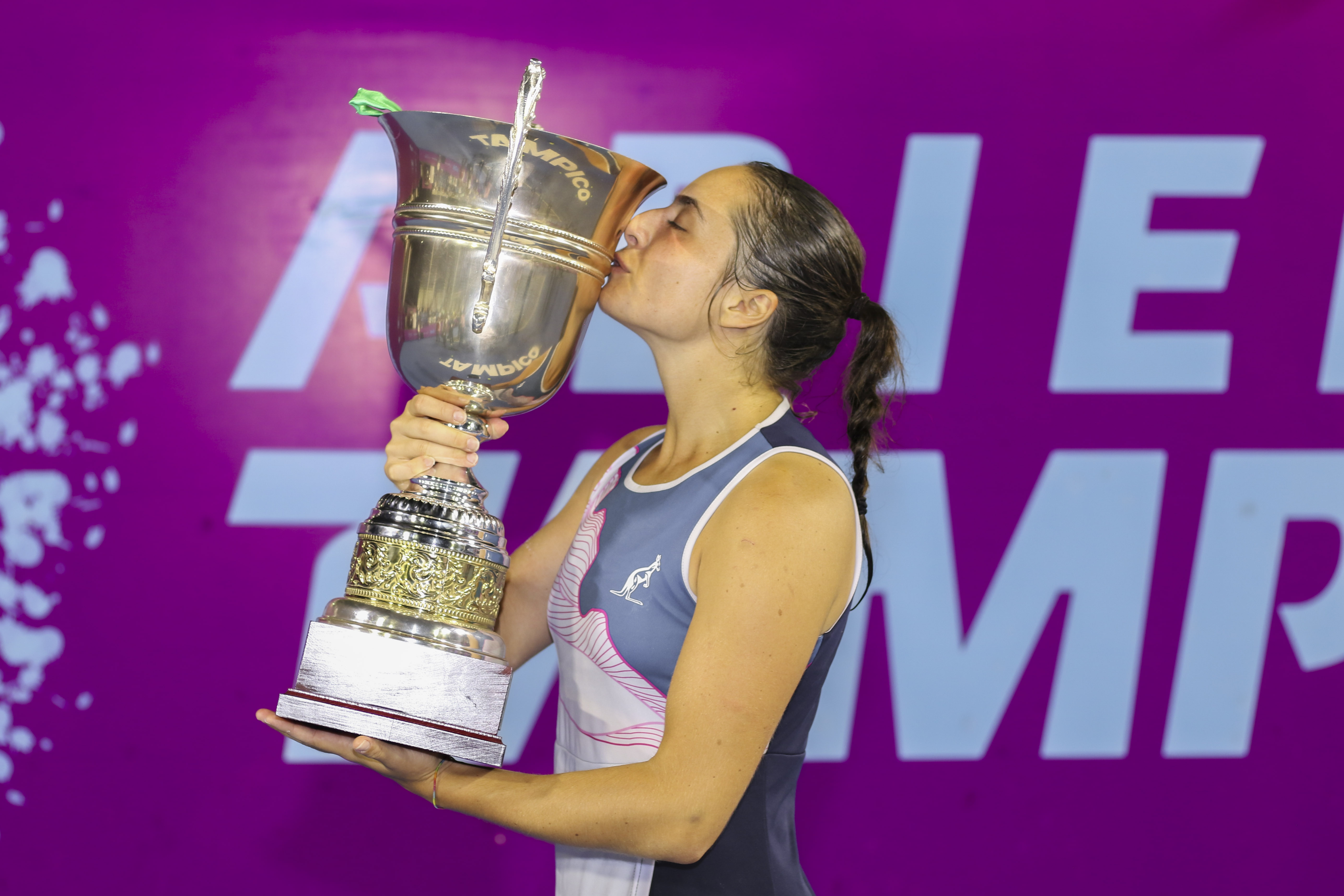
Cocciaretto with the 2022 Abierto Tampico trophy

In May, Cocciaretto made her second WTA 125 final at the Makarska International Championships, defeating Magdalena Fręch, Julia Grabher, Clara Burel, and Anna Karolína Schmiedlová, before losing to Jule Niemeier in the final.

On her debut, using her protected ranking, she recorded her first major win at Wimbledon, defeating compatriot and 22nd seed Martina Trevisan. Cocciaretto qualified for her first US Open in August, but lost to Aliaksandra Sasnovich in the first round. Seeded fifth at the Bari, she reached the quarterfinals. Partnering Olga Danilović, she won the doubles title at the same tournament, defeating Andrea Gámiz and Eva Vedder in the final.

In October, she recorded her first WTA 1000 win in Guadalajara by defeating Anastasia Potapova, before losing to fifth seed Coco Gauff. The following week, she won her maiden WTA 125 singles title at the Abierto Tampico, beating Carol Zhao, second seed Marie Bouzková, seventh seed Camila Osorio and sixth seed Zhu Lin to reach the final, where she overcame fifth seed Magda Linette in three sets.

=== 2023: Maiden WTA title, top 30, Italian No. 1 ===
In January, Cocciaretto reached her first WTA Tour final at the Hobart International, defeating third seed Alizé Cornet, Jasmine Paolini, sixth seed Bernarda Pera and Sofia Kenin, but ultimately losing to qualifier Lauren Davis. As a result, she reached the top 50 on 16 January 2023 at world No. 48, becoming the Italian No. 2 female player in the WTA rankings. The following month, she reached quarterfinals at the Mérida Open, defeating Viktorija Golubic and Wang Xinyu, before losing to fourth seed Kateřina Siniaková. The following week at the Monterrey Open, she reached back-to-back quarterfinals, defeating Marina Bassols Ribera and Tatjana Maria. Her run was ended by fourth seed Elise Mertens.

In April, she won her second WTA 125 title as the top seed in San Luis Potosí, defeating Marcela Zacarías, Nadia Podoroska, Tamara Zidanšek, Elina Avanesyan and seventh seed Sara Errani.

At the French Open, Cocciaretto defeated 10th seed Petra Kvitová and qualifier Simona Waltert before losing to Bernarda Pera in the third round. As a result, she reached a career-high ranking of No. 41 on 12 June 2023, and became the No. 1 women's singles player in Italy. At Wimbledon, she again reached the third round at a major, defeating Camila Osorio and Rebeka Masarova, before falling to fourth seed Jessica Pegula.

Seeded second at the Ladies Open Lausanne, Cocciaretto won her maiden tour title, defeating wildcard entrant Céline Naef, Julia Riera, eighth seed Elina Avanesyan, Anna Bondár and Clara Burel.

=== 2024: French Open fourth round, BJK Cup champion ===
At the Australian Open, Cocciaretto defeated qualifier Lulu Sun in the first round, but lost to 27th seed Emma Navarro in the second. As a lucky loser in Dubai, she overcame Elise Mertens in the first round, before falling to third seed Coco Gauff.

She won her third WTA 125 title seeded fourth at Charleston, defeating Arina Rodionova, Marina Bassols Ribera, McCartney Kessler, Greet Minnen and seventh seed Diana Shnaider. Seeded seventh in Rabat, Cocciaretto reached the quarterfinals defeating Yasmine Kabbaj and Bai Zhuoxuan, before losing to Kamilla Rakhimova. At the French Open, she defeated 13th seed Beatriz Haddad Maia, Cristina Bucșa and 17th seed Liudmila Samsonova to reach her first Grand Slam tournament fourth round. Cocciaretto had her run ended by third seed Coco Gauff.

Wins over top seed Jelena Ostapenko, Sloane Stephens and Diana Shnaider, saw her make it through to her first grass-court semifinal at the Birmingham Classic, before losing to eventual champion Yulia Putintseva. In November, Cocciaretto was part of the Italy squad which won the Billie Jean King Cup, although she lost the only match she was selected for, going down in three sets to Ena Shibahara in the quarterfinal tie against Japan.

=== 2025: Wimbledon third round, two-time BJK Cup champion ===
Seeded seventh at the Transylvania Open, Cocciaretto defeated Irina-Camelia Begu and wildcard entrant Ana Bogdan to reach the quarterfinals, where she lost to compatriot Lucia Bronzetti.

In June at the Rosmalen Open in 's-Hertogenbosch, she overcame wildcard entrant Arianne Hartono, Bernarda Pera and Suzan Lamens to make it through to the semifinals, where she lost to qualifier Elena-Gabriela Ruse. At Wimbledon, Cocciaretto defeated third seed Jessica Pegula in straight sets in a first-round match lasting just 58 minutes for her second win against a top-10 ranked opponent. Next she overcame Katie Volynets to make it through to the third round, at which point she lost to Belinda Bencic.

A week after her elimination from Wimbledon, Cocciaretto won the clay court WTA 125 Nordea Open in Sweden, defeating Katarzyna Kawa in the final. As a result, she returned to the top 100, rising 40 places to No. 76 on 14 July 2025.

In September, she helped Italy retain the BJK Cup, defeating Yuan Yue in their quarterfinal against China and Emma Navarro as they swept the United States 2–0 in the final. At the Guangzhou Open in October, Cocciaretto recorded three sets wins over Diane Parry and wildcard entrant Wang Xiyu, before losing in the quarterfinals to second seed Ann Li.

=== 2026: Second WTA title, WTA 1000 quarterfinal, back to top 40 ===
Having qualified for the main-draw at the Hobart International, Cocciaretto won her second WTA title, defeating third seed Iva Jovic in the final, after recording victories over fellow qualifier Ayano Shimizu, fourth seed Ann Li, Anna Bondár and Antonia Ružić on her way to the championship match.

In February at the Qatar Open, Cocciaretto entered the main-draw as a lucky loser and defeated wildcard entrant Elsa Jacquemot, world No. 4 Coco Gauff and Ann Li to reach her first WTA 1000 quarterfinal. She lost in the last eight to Jeļena Ostapenko. As a result of her performance at the tournament, Cocciaretto returned to the top 40 in the WTA singles rankings on 16 February 2026.

In May at the Italian Open, she recorded wins over qualifier Sinja Kraus and 28th seed Emma Navarro, before losing to fourth seed Iga Świątek in the third round.

At the Washington Open, Cocciaretto defeated Clara Tauson and eighth seed Emma Navarro to make it through to the quarterfinals, where she lost to third seed Naomi Osaka.

== Performance timelines ==
Key
W	F	SF	QF	#R	RR	Q#	DNQ	A	NH

(W) winner; (F) finalist; (SF) semifinalist; (QF) quarterfinalist; (#R) rounds 4, 3, 2, 1; (RR) round-robin stage; (Q#) qualification round; (DNQ) did not qualify; (A) absent; (NH) not held; (SR) strike rate (events won / competed); (W–L) win–loss record.
To avoid confusion and double counting, these charts are updated at the conclusion of a tournament or when the player's participation has ended.

Only main-draw results in WTA Tour, Grand Slam tournaments, Billie Jean King Cup, United Cup, Hopman Cup and Olympic Games are included in win–loss records.

=== Singles ===
Current through the 2026 US Open.

Tournament	2018	2019	2020	2021	2022	2023	2024	2025	2026	SR	W–L	Win%
Grand Slam tournaments
Australian Open	A	A	1R	1R	Q2	1R	2R	1R	1R	0 / 6	1–6	17%
French Open	A	A	Q2	1R	Q2	3R	4R	2R	1R	0 / 5	6–5	60%
Wimbledon	A	A	NH	A	2R	3R	A	3R	1R	0 / 4	5–4	63%
US Open	A	A	A	A	1R	1R	2R	1R	1R	0 / 5	1–5	17%
Win–loss	0–0	0–0	0–1	0–2	1–2	4–4	5–3	3–4	0–4	0 / 20	13–20	39%
National representation
Summer Olympics	not held			A	not held		1R	NH		0 / 1	0–1	0%
Billie Jean King Cup (Note: Formerly known as Fed Cup until 2020.)	PO	A	PO (Note: Edition is split into the two years due to COVID-19.)		RR	F	W	W		1 / 3	5–4	56%
WTA 1000 tournaments
Qatar Open	A	NTI	A	NTI	A	NTI	A	A	QF	0 / 1	3–1	–
Dubai Championships	NTI	A	NTI	A	NTI	A	2R	A	~~1R~~ (Note: She qualified for the main draw but withdrew later. It is not counted as a loss, but it is also not considered participation in the main draw.)	0 / 1	1–1	50%
Indian Wells Open	A	A	NH	A	A	1R	1R	2R	A	0 / 3	1–3	25%
Miami Open	A	A	NH	1R	A	1R	1R	1R	2R	0 / 5	1–5	17%
Madrid Open	A	A	NH	A	A	2R	1R	2R	1R	0 / 4	1–4	20%
Italian Open	A	1R	1R	1R	1R	2R	2R	2R	3R	0 / 8	5–8	38%
Canadian Open	A	A	NH	A	A	A	1R	A	1R	0 / 2	0–2	0%
Cincinnati Open	A	A	A	A	A	1R	2R	Q1	1R	0 / 3	1–3	25%
China Open	A	A	not held			1R	2R	Q2		0 / 2	1–2	33%
Wuhan Open	A	A	not held				A	Q1		0 / 0	0–0	–
Guadalajara Open	not held				2R	A	Not Tier I			0 / 1	1–1	50%
Win–loss	0–0	0–1	0–1	0–2	1–2	2–6	4–8	2–4	6–6	0 / 30	15–30	33%
Career statistics
	2018	2019	2020	2021	2022	2023	2024	2025	2026	SR	W–L	Win%
Tournaments	0	2	3	8	9	17	20	15	11	Career total: 82		
Titles	0	0	0	0	0	1	0	0	1	Career total: 2		
Finals	0	0	0	0	0	2	0	0	1	Career total: 3		
Hard win–loss	0–0	0–0	3–1	6–5	5–5	8–11	8–13	3–7	10–6	1 / 50	43–48	47%
Clay win–loss	0–0	0–2	2–2	0–3	5–5	9–4	7–7	1–5	4–4	1 / 32	28–32	47%
Grass win–loss	0–0	0–0	0–0	0–0	1–1	2–2	3–1	5–3		0 / 7	11–7	61%
Overall win–loss	0–0	0–2	5–3	6–8	11–11	19–17	18–21	9–15	15–8	2 / 89	83–87	49%
Year-end ranking (Note: 2017: WTA ranking-972.)	750	215	134	156	65	52	54	84		$3,680,507		

=== Doubles ===
Current through the 2024 US Open.

Tournament	2018	2019	2020	2021	2022	2023	2024	SR	W–L	Win%
Grand Slam tournaments
Australian Open	A	A	A	A	A	1R	1R	0 / 2	0–2	0%
French Open	A	A	A	A	A	1R	A	0 / 1	0–1	0%
Wimbledon	A	A	NH	A	2R	A	A	0 / 1	1–1	50%
US Open	A	A	A	A	A	1R	1R	0 / 2	0–2	0%
Win–loss	0–0	0–0	0–0	0–0	1–1	0–3	0–2	0 / 6	1–6	14%
National representation
Billie Jean King Cup	PO	A	PO		RR	F		0 / 2	3–2	60%
WTA 1000 tournaments
Italian Open	A	A	1R	A	A	A	A	0 / 1	0–1	0%
Guadalajara Open	NH				1R	A	NTI	0 / 1	0–1	0%
Career statistics
Tournaments	0	1	3	1	4	4		Career total: 13		
Titles	0	0	0	0	0	0		Career total: 0		
Finals	0	0	1	0	0	0		Career total: 1		
Overall win–loss	0–1	0–1	4–3	0–1	1–4	2–3		0 / 13	7–13	35%
Year-end ranking	821	437	257	660	397	508	132			

== WTA Tour finals ==
=== Singles: 3 (2 titles, 1 runner-up) ===
Legend WTA 250 (2–1)	Finals by surface Hard (1–1) Clay (1–0)	Finals by setting Outdoor (2–1)

Result	W–L	Date	Tournament	Tier	Surface	Opponent	Score
Loss	0–1	Jan 2023	Hobart International, Australia	WTA 250	Hard	(United States) Lauren Davis	6–7^{(0–7)}, 2–6
Win	1–1	Jul 2023	Ladies Open Lausanne, Switzerland	WTA 250	Clay	(France) Clara Burel	7–5, 4–6, 6–4
Win	2–1	Jan 2026	Hobart International, Australia	WTA 250	Hard	(United States) Iva Jovic	6–4, 6–4

=== Doubles: 1 (runner-up) ===
Legend International (0–1)	Finals by surface Clay (0–1)

Result	W–L	Date	Tournament	Tier	Surface	Partner	Opponents	Score
Loss	0–1	Aug 2020	Palermo Ladies Open, Italy	International	Clay	(Italy) Martina Trevisan	(Netherlands) Arantxa Rus (Slovenia) Tamara Zidanšek	5–7, 5–7

== WTA 125 finals ==
=== Singles: 6 (4 titles, 2 runner-ups) ===
Result	W–L	Date	Tournament	Surface	Opponent	Score
Loss	0–1	Sep 2020	Sparta Prague Open, Czech Republic	Clay	(Slovakia) Kristína Kučová	4–6, 3–6
Loss	0–2	Jun 2022	Makarska International, Croatia	Clay	(Germany) Jule Niemeier	5–7, 1–6
Win	1–2	Oct 2022	Abierto Tampico, Mexico	Hard	(Poland) Magda Linette	7–6^{(7–5)}, 4–6, 6–1
Win	2–2	Apr 2023	San Luis Open, Mexico	Clay	(Italy) Sara Errani	5–7, 6–4, 7–5
Win	3–2	Mar 2024	Charleston Pro, United States	Hard	(Russia) Diana Shnaider	6–3, 6–2
Win	4–2	Jul 2025	Bastad Open, Sweden	Clay	(Poland) Katarzyna Kawa	6–3, 6–4

=== Doubles: 1 (title) ===
Result	W–L	Date	Tournament	Surface	Partner	Opponents	Score
Win	1–0	Sep 2022	Bari Open, Italy	Clay	(Serbia) Olga Danilović	(Venezuela) Andrea Gámiz (Netherlands) Eva Vedder	6–2, 6–3

== ITF Circuit finals ==
=== Singles: 9 (6 titles, 3 runner-ups) ===
Legend
$80,000 tournaments (1–0)
$60,000 tournaments (3–0)
$25,000 tournaments (1–3)
$15,000 tournaments (1–0)

Result	W–L	Date	Tournament	Tier	Surface	Opponent	Score
Win	1–0	Nov 2018	ITF Nules, Spain	15,000	Clay	(Spain) Cristina Bucșa	6–2, 7–6^{(7–2)}
Loss	1–1	Jul 2019	ITF Turin, Italy	25,000	Clay	(Japan) Yuki Naito	3–6, 4–6
Win	2–1	Sep 2019	ITF Trieste, Italy	25,000	Clay	(Switzerland) Susan Bandecchi	6–3, 6–1
Loss	2–2	Sep 2019	ITF Pula, Italy	25,000	Clay	(Netherlands) Arantxa Rus	3–6, 7–6^{(7–5)}, 4–6
Win	3–2	Nov 2019	Asunción Open, Paraguay	60,000	Clay	(Italy) Sara Errani	6–1, 4–6, 6–0
Win	4–2	Nov 2019	Copa Santiago, Chile	60,000	Clay	(Argentina) Victoria Bosio	6–3, 6–4
Loss	4–3	Mar 2022	ITF Antalya, Turkey	25,000	Clay	(Croatia) Petra Marčinko	6–1, 4–6, 4–6
Win	5–3	Apr 2022	Oeiras Ladies Open, Portugal	80,000	Clay	(Bulgaria) Viktoriya Tomova	7–6^{(7–5)}, 2–6, 7–5
Win	6–3	May 2022	Grado Tennis Cup, Italy	60,000	Clay	(Switzerland) Ylena In-Albon	6–2, 6–2

=== Doubles: 1 (title) ===
Result	Date	Tournament	Tier	Surface	Partner	Opponents	Score
Win	Jun 2019	Internazionale ATV Roma, Italy	60,000+H	Clay	(Romania) Nicoleta Dascălu	(Brazil) Carolina Alves (Romania) Elena Bogdan	7–5, 4–6, [10–7]

== Wins against top 10 players ==
- Cocciaretto has a 3–7 record against players who were, at the time the match was played, ranked in the top 10.

No.	Player	Rk	Event	Surface	Rd	Score	Rk	Years	Ref
1	(Czech Republic) Petra Kvitová	10	French Open, France	Clay	1R	6–3, 6–4	44	2023	
2	(United States) Jessica Pegula	3	Wimbledon, United Kingdom	Grass	1R	6–2, 6–3	116	2025	
3	(United States) Coco Gauff	5	Qatar Open, Qatar	Hard	2R	6–4, 6–2	57	2026	

- Key: (Rk) first use, opponent rank; (Rd) round; (Rk) 2nd use, player rank; (Ref) reference; (F) final; (SF) semifinal; (QF) quarterfinal; (#R) rounds 4, 3, 2, 1; (RR) round-robin stage; (Q#) qualifying rounds or stages (3), 2, 1.
