= Bianca Fernandez =

Canadian tennis player (born 2004)

- Full name: Bianca Jolie Fernandez
- Country (sports): Canada
- Residence: Boynton Beach, Florida, U.S.
- Born: 24 February 2004 (age 21) Montréal, Quebec, Canada
- Height: 1.65 m (5 ft 5 in)
- Plays: Right (two-handed backhand)
- College: UCLA
- Prize money: $74,714

Singles
- Career record: 77–69
- Career titles: 0
- Highest ranking: No. 606 (11 September 2023)

Doubles
- Career record: 40–46
- Career titles: 0
- Highest ranking: No. 169 (3 March 2025)
- Current ranking: No. 189 (28 July 2025)
- Last updated on: 28 July 2025.

Bianca Jolie Fernandez (Spanish: Fernández; born 24 February 2004) is a Canadian tennis player.

Fernandez has a career-high singles ranking by the WTA of 606, achieved on 11 September 2023. She also has a career-high WTA doubles ranking of No. 169, achieved on 3 March 2025.

She's the younger sister of Leylah Fernandez.

== Career ==
Having previously played an exhibition doubles match with the Bryan brothers, Fernandez made her WTA Tour main-draw debut at the 2022 Monterrey Open in the doubles draw, partnering with her sister, Leylah Fernandez. They lost in the first round to Elixane Lechemia and Ingrid Neel. Later that year, she recorded her first WTA main draw doubles win at her home tournament, the WTA 1000 2022 National Bank Open in Toronto, Canada, she and Leylah defeated Kirsten Flipkens and Sara Sorribes Tormo in the first round.

Given a wildcard into the doubles at the WTA 1000 2024 Canadian Open, again with her sister Leylah, she reached the semifinals at which point they lost to top seeds Gabriela Dabrowski and Erin Routliffe.

== ITF finals ==
=== Doubles: 5 (5 runner-ups) ===
Legend W25/35 tournaments (0–2) W15 tournaments (0–2)	Finals by surface Hard (0–3) Clay (0–2)

Result	W–L	Date	Tournament	Tier	Surface	Partner	Opponents	Score
Loss	0–1	Oct 2020	ITF Sharm El Sheikh, Egypt	W15	Hard	(Canada) Leylah Fernandez	(Russia) Veronika Pepelyaeva (Russia) Anastasia Tikhonova	6–4, 3–6, [6–10]
Loss	0–2	Sep 2021	ITF Marbella, Spain	W25	Clay	(Spain) Ana Lantigua de la Nuez	(Spain) Yvonne Cavallé Reimers (Spain) Ángela Fita Boluda	3–6, 2–6
Loss	0–3	Jan 2023	ITF Fort-de-France (Martinique), France	W15	Hard	(United States) Anna Ulyashchenko	(Switzerland) Jenny Dürst (Sweden) Fanny Östlund	4–6, 6–3, [4–10]
Loss	0–4	Apr 2023	ITF Santa Margherita di Pula, Italy	W25	Clay	(United States) Chiara Scholl	(Japan) Misaki Matsuda (Japan) Ikumi Yamazaki	6–4, 2–6, [9–11]
Loss	0–5	Sep 2024	ITF Leiria, Portugal	W35	Hard	(Slovakia) Radka Zelníčková	(United Kingdom) Sarah Beth Grey (Portugal) Matilde Jorge	6–7^{(1)}, 2–6
