= Tampico (disambiguation) =

Tampico is a city and port in Tamaulipas, Mexico.

Tampico may also refer to:

== Places ==
- Tampico, Illinois, a village in Tampico Township
- Tampico, Indiana, United States
- Tampico, Ohio, an unincorporated community
- Tampico, Washington, United States
- Center, Indiana, originally called Tampico
- Libramiento Poniente de Tampico (or Tampico Western Bypass or the Maxi Libramiento Tampico), a section of the Mexican Federal Highway 70D operated by Caminos y Puentes
- Pueblo Viejo Municipality, Veracruz, Pueblo Viejo de Tampico
- Peoria to Tampico/Dixon, a section of the Ronald Reagan Trail
- Tampico Alto, a town in the Mexican state of Veracruz
- Tampico Bridge, connecting the states of Tamaulipas and Veracruz, Mexico
- Tampico International Airport (IATA: TAM, ICAO: MMTM), an international airport located at Tampico, Tamaulipas, Mexico
- Tampico metropolitan area, the third most populous metropolitan area in the state of Tamaulipas, in the country of Mexico
- Tampico Mounds, a prehistoric archaeological site located in Fulton County, Illinois near the community of Maples Mill
- Tampico Road, a section of Illinois Route 172
- Tampico Township, Whiteside County, Illinois, United States

== Arts, entertainment, and media ==
- "Tampico" (song), a 1945 song by Stan Kenton with June Christy on vocals
- "Tampico", a 1973 song by Heino
- Tampico (film), a 1944 film starring Edward G. Robinson and Lynn Bari
- Tampico, a 1926 novel by Joseph Hergesheimer

== Brands and enterprises ==
- Grupo Tampico, one of the largest companies in northeastern Mexico
- Tampico Beverages, a supplier of juice drink concentrates

== Education ==
- Educación Profesional de Tampico, AC (Tampico's Professional Education or Autonomous University of Tamaulipas), a Mexican public university
- Instituto Cultural Tampico (ICT, a K-12 private school founded in 1962 by the Society of Jesus in the city of Tampico, Mexico
- Monterrey Institute of Technology and Higher Education, Tampico, in Mexico
- Tampico High School also known Prophetstown High School, serves the Prophetstown-Lyndon-Tampico Community Unit School District 3, for the communities of Prophetstown, Lyndon, Tampico, Deer Grove, and Yorktown
- The American School of Tampico, an elementary, middle and high school in Tampico, Mexico

== Military ==
- Tampico, a Mexican Navy gunboat involved in the First Battle of Topolobampo on March 4, 1914, during the Mexican Revolution
- Battle of Tampico (1829), the port town was seized by 3,000 Spanish troops from Havana during the Spanish attempts to reconquer Mexico
- Battle of Tampico (1839) or "Siege of Tampico", a siege that lasted from 26 May until 4 June 1839 during the Mexican Federalist War
- Battle of Tampico (1863), was a victory for the Republicans on 19 January during the French intervention in Mexico
- Tampico Affair (1914), an incident involving U.S. sailors and Mexican land forces loyal to Mexican dictator General Victoriano Huerta
- Tampico Expedition (1835), an expedition for the purpose of supporting Federalist opposition to the Centralist government of Mexico, which involved the "Battle of Tampico" fought November 15, 1835, in the Mexican state of Tamaulipas

== Religion ==
- Roman Catholic Diocese of Tampico
- Tampico Amish Mennonites, a Plain, car-driving branch of the Amish Mennonites also known as "Kauffman Amish Mennonites", "Sleeping Preacher Churches", or "Tampico Amish Mennonite Churches"
- Tampico Cathedral, a Roman Catholic church also known as Immaculate Conception Cathedral(Catedral de la Inmaculada Concepción or Catedral de Tampico costado Oriente, in Tampico, Mexico
- Tampico Mexico Temple, located in Ciudad Madero, part of the Tampico conurbation

== Sports ==
- Abierto Tampico, a tournament for professional female tennis players played on outdoor hard courts
  - 2014 Abierto Tampico – Singles
  - 2015 Abierto Tampico
  - 2016 Abierto Tampico
  - 2017 Abierto Tampico – Singles
- Alijadores de Tampico (Tampico Lightermen), a former professional baseball club based in Tampico, Tamaulipas that played in the Mexican League
- Tampico Madero F.C., or Tampico Madero Fútbol Club, a football (soccer) club that currently plays in the Ascenso, MX

== Other uses ==
- 1933 Tampico hurricane, a Category 5 hurricane
- Istle, or Tampico, a type of hard plant fiber obtained from a number of Mexican plants used in the manufacture of brushes, cords, and ropes
- TB-9 Tampico GT, one of the models of the Socata TB series of aircraft
- Tampico fiber from northern Mexico, used to make bristles on brushes, ropes, and other uses.
