= Battle of Tampico =

Battle of Tampico may refer to:

- Battle of Tampico (1829), port town seized by 3,000 Spanish troops during attempt to reconquer Mexico
- Tampico Expedition (1835), an expedition to support Federalist opposition to the Centralist government of Mexico
- Battle of Tampico (1839), a siege from May 26 until June 4, 1839 during the Mexican Federalist War
- Battle of Tampico (1863), a victory for the Republicans on January 19 during the French intervention in Mexico (1862–1867)

== See also ==
- Tampico (disambiguation)
