= 2018 Citi Open – Women's doubles =

Women's doubles
- 2018 Citi Open

Final
- Champions: (China) Han Xinyun (Croatia) Darija Jurak
- Runners-up: (Chile) Alexa Guarachi (New Zealand) Erin Routliffe
- Score: 6–3, 6–2

Details
- Draw: 16
- Seeds: 4

Events
Singles	men	women
Doubles	men	women
- Citi Open

Shuko Aoyama and Renata Voráčová were the defending doubles champions, but lost in the quarterfinals to Kristie Ahn and Lauren Davis.

Third-seeded pairing Han Xinyun and Darija Jurak won the title, defeating Alexa Guarachi and Erin Routliffe in the final, 6–3, 6–2.

== Seeds ==
1. (Chinese Taipei) Chan Hao-ching / (China) Yang Zhaoxuan (quarterfinals)
2. (Japan) Shuko Aoyama / (Czech Republic) Renata Voráčová (quarterfinals)
3. (China) Han Xinyun / (Croatia) Darija Jurak (champions)
4. (Chile) Alexa Guarachi / (New Zealand) Erin Routliffe (final)

== Draw ==
Key

- Q = Qualifier
- WC = Wild card
- LL = Lucky loser
- Alt = Alternate
- ITF = ITF entry
- PR = Protected ranking
- SR = Special ranking
- SE = Special exempt
- JE = Junior exempt
- JR = Junior Accelerator Programme entrant
- CO = College Accelerator Programme entrant
- NG = Next Gen Accelerator Program entrant
- w/o = Walkover
- r = Retired
- d = Defaulted

=== Draw ===
First round
1	(Chinese Taipei) H-c Chan (China) Z Yang	6	6
(United States) S Chang (United States) A Mueller	2	3
(Belgium) Y Bonaventure (Hungary) F Stollár	w/o
(Serbia) A Krunić (China) S Zheng
3	(China) X Han (Croatia) D Jurak	2	6	[10]
(Chinese Taipei) P-h Chen (Chinese Taipei) F-h Wu	6	1	[5]
Alt	(United Kingdom) K Swan (Netherlands) R van der Hoek	6	1	[8]
(Switzerland) B Bencic (Ukraine) A Kalinina	3	6	[10]
(United States) L Chirico (United States) A Kiick	6	7^{7}
WC	(United States) A Smith (United States) N Subhash	4	6^{4}
(United Kingdom) H Dart (India) P Thombare	6^{3}	5
4	(Chile) A Guarachi (New Zealand) E Routliffe	7^{7}	7
WC	(United States) N Hammond (Czech Republic) K Nepivodová	1	2
(United States) K Ahn (United States) L Davis	6	6
(United States) F Di Lorenzo (United States) J Loeb	6^{1}	4
2	(Japan) S Aoyama (Czech Republic) R Voráčová	7^{7}	6

Quarterfinals
1	(Chinese Taipei) H-c Chan (China) Z Yang	5	6	[3]
(Belgium) Y Bonaventure (Hungary) F Stollár	7	4	[10]
3	(China) X Han (Croatia) D Jurak	7^{9}	3	[10]
(Switzerland) B Bencic (Ukraine) A Kalinina	6^{7}	6	[4]
(United States) L Chirico (United States) A Kiick
4	(Chile) A Guarachi (New Zealand) E Routliffe	w/o
(United States) K Ahn (United States) L Davis	5	6	[11]
2	(Japan) S Aoyama (Czech Republic) R Voráčová	7	4	[9]

Semifinals
(Belgium) Y Bonaventure (Hungary) F Stollár	2	2
3	(China) X Han (Croatia) D Jurak	6	6
4	(Chile) A Guarachi (New Zealand) E Routliffe	7	3	[10]
(United States) K Ahn (United States) L Davis	5	6	[8]

Final
3	(China) X Han (Croatia) D Jurak	6	6
4	(Chile) A Guarachi (New Zealand) E Routliffe	3	2
