= 2016 Abierto Tampico =

- Date: 24–30 October
- Edition: 4th
- Category: ITF Women's Circuit
- Prize money: $50,000+H
- Surface: Hard
- Location: Tampico, Mexico

Champions

Singles
- (Russia) Sofya Zhuk

Doubles
- (Romania) Mihaela Buzărnescu / (Belgium) Elise Mertens
| ← 2015 · | Abierto Tampico | · 2017 → |

The 2016 Abierto Tampico was a professional tennis tournament played on outdoor hard courts. It was the 4th edition of the tournament and part of the 2016 ITF Women's Circuit, offering a total of $50,000+H in prize money. It took place in Tampico, Mexico, on 24–30 October 2016.

== Singles main draw entrants ==
=== Seeds ===
| Country | Player | Rank^{1} | Seed |
|---|---|---|---|
| BEL | Elise Mertens | 133 | 1 |
| SLO | Dalila Jakupović | 161 | 2 |
| CAN | Françoise Abanda | 173 | 3 |
| RUS | Anastasia Pivovarova | 176 | 4 |
| ARG | Catalina Pella | 182 | 5 |
| ARG | Nadia Podoroska | 200 | 6 |
| JPN | Mayo Hibi | 207 | 7 |
| GBR | Laura Robson | 216 | 8 |

- ^{1} Rankings as of 17 October 2016.

=== Other entrants ===
The following player received a wildcard into the singles main draw:

- (Mexico) Giuliana Olmos
- (Mexico) Nazari Urbina
- (Mexico) Marcela Zacarías
- (Russia) Sofya Zhuk

The following players received entry from the qualifying draw:

- (United States) Hanna Chang
- (United States) Nicole Coopersmith
- (United States) Mara Schmidt
- (Hungary) Naomi Totka

The following players received entry by lucky loser spots:

- (Mexico) Karla de la Luz Montalvo
- (United States) Eva Raszkiewicz
- (Mexico) Andrea Renee Villarreal

The following player received entry by a junior exempt:

- (United Kingdom) Katie Swan

== Champions ==
=== Singles ===
- (Russia) Sofya Zhuk def. (Russia) Varvara Flink, 6–4, 6–3

=== Doubles ===
- (Romania) Mihaela Buzărnescu / (Belgium) Elise Mertens def. (United States) Usue Maitane Arconada / (United Kingdom) Katie Swan, 6–0, 6–2
