= 2018 Rogers Cup – Women's singles =

Women's singles
- 2018 Rogers Cup

Final
- Champion: (Romania) Simona Halep
- Runner-up: (United States) Sloane Stephens
- Score: 7–6^{(8–6)}, 3–6, 6–4

Details
- Draw: 56 (12 Q / 3 WC )
- Seeds: 16

Events
Singles	men	women
Doubles	men	women
← 2017 ·	Rogers Cup	· 2019 →

Simona Halep defeated Sloane Stephens in the final, 7–6^{(8–6)}, 3–6, 6–4 to win the women's singles tennis title at the 2018 Canadian Open.

Elina Svitolina was the defending champion, but lost to Stephens in the semifinals.

== Seeds ==
The top eight seeds received a bye into the second round.

1. (Romania) Simona Halep (champion)
2. (Denmark) Caroline Wozniacki (second round)
3. (United States) Sloane Stephens (final)
4. (Germany) Angelique Kerber (second round)
5. (Ukraine) Elina Svitolina (semifinals)
6. (France) Caroline Garcia (quarterfinals)
7. (Spain) Garbiñe Muguruza (withdrew)
8. (Czech Republic) Petra Kvitová (third round)

9. (Czech Republic) Karolína Plíšková (second round)
10. (Germany) Julia Görges (third round)
11. (Latvia) Jeļena Ostapenko (first round)
12. (Russia) Daria Kasatkina (second round)
13. (United States) Venus Williams (third round)
14. (Belgium) Elise Mertens (quarterfinals)
15. (Australia) Ashleigh Barty (semifinals)
16. (Japan) Naomi Osaka (first round)

Click on the seed number of a player to go to their draw section.

== Draw ==
=== Key ===
- Q = Qualifier
- WC = Wild card
- LL = Lucky loser
- Alt = Alternate
- ITF = ITF entry
- PR = Protected ranking
- SR = Special ranking
- SE = Special exempt
- JE = Junior exempt
- JR = Junior Accelerator Programme entrant
- CO = College Accelerator Programme entrant
- NG = Next Gen Accelerator Program entrant
- w/o = Walkover
- r = Retired
- d = Defaulted

=== Finals ===
Quarterfinals
1	(Romania) Simona Halep	7	6
6	(France) Caroline Garcia	5	1
15	(Australia) Ashleigh Barty	6	6
(Netherlands) Kiki Bertens	3	1
(Latvia) Anastasija Sevastova	2	2
3	(United States) Sloane Stephens	6	6
5	(Ukraine) Elina Svitolina	7	6
14	(Belgium) Elise Mertens	5	3

Semifinals
1	(Romania) Simona Halep	6	6
15	(Australia) Ashleigh Barty	4	1
3	(United States) Sloane Stephens	6	6
5	(Ukraine) Elina Svitolina	3	3

Final
1	(Romania) Simona Halep	7^{8}	3	6
3	(United States) Sloane Stephens	6^{6}	6	4

=== Top half ===
==== Section 1 ====
First round
(Russia) A Pavlyuchenkova	6	6
Q	(United States) C McHale	3	2
Q	(Romania) M Niculescu	6	4	4
(Romania) S Cîrstea	3	6	6
Q	(United States) C Dolehide	5	1
13	(United States) V Williams	7	6
12	(Russia) D Kasatkina	6	4	6
(Greece) M Sakkari	4	6	1
(Russia) M Sharapova	6	6
Q	(Bulgaria) S Karatantcheva	1	2
(Czech Republic) B Strýcová	6	6^{6}	2
(Slovakia) M Rybáriková	3	7^{8}	6

Second round
1	(Romania) S Halep	7^{11}	4	7
(Russia) A Pavlyuchenkova	6^{9}	6	5
(Romania) S Cîrstea	6^{4}	4
13	(United States) V Williams	7^{7}	6
12	(Russia) D Kasatkina	0	2
(Russia) M Sharapova	6	6
(Slovakia) M Rybáriková	6	1	3
6	(France) C Garcia	4	6	6

Third round
1	(Romania) S Halep	6	6
13	(United States) V Williams	2	2
(Russia) M Sharapova	3	2
6	(France) C Garcia	6	6

Quarterfinals
1	(Romania) S Halep	7	6
6	(France) C Garcia	5	1

==== Section 2 ====
First round
Alt	(Germany) T Maria	6	1	3
(France) A Cornet	4	6	6
(Belgium) A Van Uytvanck	6	6
Q	(Russia) S Zhuk	1	2
(Romania) I-C Begu	3	6	5
15	(Australia) A Barty	6	1	7
9	(Czech Republic) Ka Plíšková	6	6
(Czech Republic) K Siniaková	4	4
WC	(Canada) C Zhao	1	2
(Netherlands) K Bertens	6	6
(Russia) E Makarova	6	3	1
(Estonia) A Kontaveit	4	6	6

Second round
4	(Germany) A Kerber	4	1
(France) A Cornet	6	6
(Belgium) A Van Uytvanck	6^{7}	2
15	(Australia) A Barty	7^{9}	6
9	(Czech Republic) Ka Plíšková	2	2
(Netherlands) K Bertens	6	6
(Estonia) A Kontaveit	3	4
8	(Czech Republic) P Kvitová	6	6

Third round
(France) A Cornet	6^{3}	4
15	(Australia) A Barty	7^{7}	6
(Netherlands) K Bertens	6	6
8	(Czech Republic) P Kvitová	3	2

Quarterfinals
15	(Australia) A Barty	6	6
(Netherlands) K Bertens	3	1

=== Bottom half ===
==== Section 3 ====
First round
(Serbia) A Krunić	1	0
(Latvia) A Sevastova	6	6
Q	(Czech Republic) L Šafářová	4	6	7
(Australia) D Gavrilova	6	4	5
(Hungary) T Babos	6	6^{3}	4
10	(Germany) J Görges	3	7^{7}	6
16	(Japan) N Osaka	6^{2}	2
Q	(Spain) C Suárez Navarro	7^{7}	6
(Ukraine) L Tsurenko	6	6
Q	(United Kingdom) K Boulter	4	2
WC	(Canada) F Abanda	6	6
Q	(Belgium) K Flipkens	3	2

Second round
LL	(Puerto Rico) M Puig	6	6^{9}	1
(Latvia) A Sevastova	4	7^{11}	6
Q	(Czech Republic) L Šafářová	6	4	3
10	(Germany) J Görges	2	6	6
Q	(Spain) C Suárez Navarro	6	3
(Ukraine) L Tsurenko	4	2^{r}
WC	(Canada) F Abanda	0	2
3	(United States) S Stephens	6	6

Third round
(Latvia) A Sevastova	6	7^{7}
10	(Germany) J Görges	3	6^{2}
Q	(Spain) C Suárez Navarro	2	5
3	(United States) S Stephens	6	7

Quarterfinals
(Latvia) A Sevastova	2	2
3	(United States) S Stephens	6	6

==== Section 4 ====
First round
Q	(China) Q Wang	2	5
(Romania) M Buzărnescu	6	7
WC	(Belarus) V Azarenka	6	6
(France) K Mladenovic	0	1
(United Kingdom) J Konta	6^{6}	6	6
11	(Latvia) J Ostapenko	7^{8}	1	2
14	(Belgium) E Mertens	6	6
WC	(Canada) E Bouchard	2	4
(China) S Zhang	7	7
Q	(Czech Republic) B Krejčíková	5	5
(Belarus) A Sabalenka	6	4	6
Q	(Romania) A Bogdan	4	6	3

Second round
5	(Ukraine) E Svitolina	6	6^{5}	4
(Romania) M Buzărnescu	3	7^{7}	3^{r}
WC	(Belarus) V Azarenka	3	1
(United Kingdom) J Konta	6	6
14	(Belgium) E Mertens	6	6^{2}	6
(China) S Zhang	2	7^{7}	0
(Belarus) A Sabalenka	5	6	7^{7}
2	(Denmark) C Wozniacki	7	2	6^{4}

Third round
5	(Ukraine) E Svitolina	6	6
(United Kingdom) J Konta	3	4
14	(Belgium) E Mertens	2	7^{7}	6
(Belarus) A Sabalenka	6	6^{1}	0

Quarterfinals
5	(Ukraine) E Svitolina	7	6
14	(Belgium) E Mertens	5	3

== Qualifying ==
=== Seeds ===
1. (Spain) Carla Suárez Navarro (qualified)
2. (Croatia) Donna Vekić (withdrew, still competing in Washington)
3. (Belgium) Kirsten Flipkens (qualified)
4. (Kazakhstan) Yulia Putintseva (withdrew, still competing in Washington)
5. (China) Wang Qiang (qualified)
6. (Czech Republic) Lucie Šafářová (qualified)
7. (Romania) Monica Niculescu (qualified)
8. (Poland) Magda Linette (withdrew, still competing in Washington)
9. (Australia) Samantha Stosur (first round)
10. (Puerto Rico) Monica Puig (qualifying competition, lucky loser)
11. (United States) Alison Riske (qualifying competition)
12. (United States) Sofia Kenin (qualifying competition)
13. (Belarus) Vera Lapko (first round)
14. (United States) Jennifer Brady (qualifying competition)
15. (United States) Sachia Vickery (qualifying competition, retired)
16. (Switzerland) Stefanie Vögele (first round)
17. (Ukraine) Kateryna Bondarenko (qualifying competition, retired)
18. (Germany) Tatjana Maria (moved to main draw)
19. (China) Zheng Saisai (withdrew, still competing in Washington)
20. (Romania) Ana Bogdan (qualified)
21. (Germany) Andrea Petkovic (withdrew, still competing in Washington)
22. (Slovenia) Dalila Jakupović (qualifying competition)
23. (Belgium) Yanina Wickmayer (first round)
24. (United States) Bernarda Pera (qualifying competition)

=== Qualifiers ===
1. (Spain) Carla Suárez Navarro
2. (United Kingdom) Katie Boulter
3. (Belgium) Kirsten Flipkens
4. (Czech Republic) Barbora Krejčíková
5. (China) Wang Qiang
6. (Czech Republic) Lucie Šafářová
7. (Romania) Monica Niculescu
8. (Bulgaria) Sesil Karatantcheva
9. (Russia) Sofya Zhuk
10. (United States) Caroline Dolehide
11. (United States) Christina McHale
12. (Romania) Ana Bogdan

=== Lucky loser ===
1. (Puerto Rico) Monica Puig

=== Draw ===
==== First qualifier ====
First round
1	(Spain) Carla Suárez Navarro	6	6
WC	(Australia) Anastasia Rodionova	3	2
(United States) Irina Falconi	3	6	3
17	(Ukraine) Kateryna Bondarenko	6	3	6

Qualifying competition
1	(Spain) Carla Suárez Navarro	6	0
17	(Ukraine) Kateryna Bondarenko	0	0^{r}

==== Second qualifier ====
First round
2	(Croatia) Donna Vekić
(United Kingdom) Katie Boulter	w/o
WC	(Canada) Leylah Fernandez	6	6
Alt	(Poland) Alicja Rosolska	3	2

Qualifying competition
(United Kingdom) Katie Boulter	2	6	6
WC	(Canada) Leylah Fernandez	6	3	4

==== Third qualifier ====
First round				Qualifying competition
3	(Belgium) Kirsten Flipkens	6	6
	(United States) Bethanie Mattek-Sands	1	4
	(United States) Bethanie Mattek-Sands	1	4	3	(Belgium) Kirsten Flipkens	1	6	6
					(Czech Republic) Andrea Sestini Hlaváčková	6	1	2

==== Fourth qualifier ====
First round
4	(Kazakhstan) Yulia Putintseva
(Czech Republic) Barbora Krejčíková	w/o
WC	(Canada) Isabelle Boulais	2	1
15	(United States) Sachia Vickery	6	6

Qualifying competition
(Czech Republic) Barbora Krejčíková	6	1
15	(United States) Sachia Vickery	4	0^{r}

==== Fifth qualifier ====
First round
5	(China) Wang Qiang	w/o
(Belgium) Ysaline Bonaventure
(Canada) Rebecca Marino	3	6	6
13	(Belarus) Vera Lapko	6	3	3

Qualifying competition
5	(China) Wang Qiang	7	6
(Canada) Rebecca Marino	5	4

==== Sixth qualifier ====
First round
6	(Czech Republic) Lucie Šafářová	6	7^{7}
(Canada) Katherine Sebov	4	6^{4}
(Paraguay) Verónica Cepede Royg	1	2
14	(United States) Jennifer Brady	6	6

Qualifying competition
6	(Czech Republic) Lucie Šafářová	4	6	6
14	(United States) Jennifer Brady	6	2	2

==== Seventh qualifier ====
First round
7	(Romania) Monica Niculescu	6	6
(Russia) Ekaterina Alexandrova	3	3
WC	(Canada) Catherine Leduc	2	2
22	(Slovenia) Dalila Jakupović	6	6

Qualifying competition
7	(Romania) Monica Niculescu	6	7^{7}
22	(Slovenia) Dalila Jakupović	1	6^{0}

==== Eighth qualifier ====
First round
Alt	(Netherlands) Demi Schuurs	2	3
(Bulgaria) Sesil Karatantcheva	6	6
(Australia) Lizette Cabrera	w/o
19	(China) Zheng Saisai

Qualifying competition
(Bulgaria) Sesil Karatantcheva	4	6	6
(Australia) Lizette Cabrera	6	3	1

==== Ninth qualifier ====
First round
9	(Australia) Samantha Stosur	3	6^{5}
(Russia) Sofya Zhuk	6	7^{7}
(Canada) Gabriela Dabrowski	1	2
24	(United States) Bernarda Pera	6	6

Qualifying competition
(Russia) Sofya Zhuk	1	6	6
24	(United States) Bernarda Pera	6	3	3

==== Tenth qualifier ====
First round
10	(Puerto Rico) Monica Puig	6	6
WC	(Canada) Carson Branstine	3	3
(United States) Caroline Dolehide	6	6
23	(Belgium) Yanina Wickmayer	3	4

Qualifying competition
10	(Puerto Rico) Monica Puig	3	6	3
(United States) Caroline Dolehide	6	4	6

==== Eleventh qualifier ====
First round
11	(United States) Alison Riske	6	6
(Czech Republic) Renata Voráčová	3	1
(United States) Christina McHale	7^{7}	7^{7}
16	(Switzerland) Stefanie Vögele	6^{2}	6^{2}

Qualifying competition
11	(United States) Alison Riske	7	1	4
(United States) Christina McHale	5	6	6

==== Twelfth qualifier ====
First round
12	(United States) Sofia Kenin	5	6	6
WC	(Canada) Alexandra Vagramov	7	4	2
(Poland) Magdalena Fręch	3	1^{r}
20	(Romania) Ana Bogdan	6	4

Qualifying competition
12	(United States) Sofia Kenin	6	2	4
20	(Romania) Ana Bogdan	4	6	6
