= 2018 Citi Open =

- Date: July 30 – August 5
- Edition: 50th (men) / 8th (women)
- Category: ATP World Tour 500 (men); WTA International (women)
- Surface: Hard (outdoor); SportMaster Sport Surfaces
- Location: Washington, D.C., United States

Champions

Men's singles
- (Germany) Alexander Zverev

Women's singles
- (Russia) Svetlana Kuznetsova

Men's doubles
- (United Kingdom) Jamie Murray / (Brazil) Bruno Soares

Women's doubles
- (China) Han Xinyun / (Croatia) Darija Jurak
- Washington Open

The 2018 Washington Open (called the Citi Open for sponsorship reasons) was a tennis tournament played on outdoor hard courts. It was the 50th edition (for the men) and the 8th edition (for the women) of the Washington Open. The event was part of the ATP World Tour 500 series of the 2018 ATP World Tour, and of the WTA International tournaments of the 2018 WTA Tour. It took place at the William H.G. FitzGerald Tennis Center in Washington, D.C., United States, from July 30 to August 5, 2018.

== Finals ==
=== Men's singles ===
- (Germany) Alexander Zverev defeated (Australia) Alex de Minaur, 6–2, 6–4

=== Women's singles ===
- (Russia) Svetlana Kuznetsova defeated (Croatia) Donna Vekić, 4–6, 7–6^{(9–7)}, 6–2

=== Men's doubles ===
- (United Kingdom) Jamie Murray / (Brazil) Bruno Soares defeated (United States) Mike Bryan / (France) Édouard Roger-Vasselin, 3–6, 6–3, [10–4]

=== Women's doubles ===
- (China) Han Xinyun / (Croatia) Darija Jurak defeated (Chile) Alexa Guarachi / (New Zealand) Erin Routliffe, 6–3, 6–2

== Points and prize money ==
=== Point distribution ===
Event	W	F	SF	QF	Round of 16	Round of 32	Round of 64	Q	Q2	Q1
Men's singles	500	300	180	90	45	20	0	10	4	0
Men's doubles	500	300	180	90	0	—N/a	—N/a	45	25	0
Women's singles	280	180	110	60	30	1	—N/a	18	12	1
Women's doubles	280	180	110	60	1	—N/a	—N/a	—N/a	—N/a	—N/a

=== Prize money ===
Event	W	F	SF	QF	Round of 16	Round of 32	Round of 64^{1}	Q2	Q1
Men's singles	$384,120	$188,315	$94,755	$48,195	$25,025	$13,200	$7,130	$1,460	$745
Men's doubles *	$115,650	$56,620	$28,400	$14,580	$7,540	—N/a	—N/a	—N/a	—N/a
Women's singles	$43,000	$21,400	$11,500	$6,200	$3,420	$2,220	—N/a	$1,285	$750
Women's doubles *	$12,300	$6,400	$3,435	$1,820	$960	—N/a	—N/a	—N/a	—N/a

_{^{1} Qualifiers prize money is also the Round of 64 prize money}
_{* per team}

== ATP singles main-draw entrants ==
=== Seeds ===
Country	Player	Rank^{1}	Seed
GER	Alexander Zverev	3	1
USA	John Isner	9	2
BEL	David Goffin	11	3
GBR	Kyle Edmund	16	4
~~AUS~~	~~Nick Kyrgios~~	~~18~~	~~5~~
FRA	Lucas Pouille	19	6
JPN	Kei Nishikori	20	7
KOR	Chung Hyeon	23	8
CAN	Denis Shapovalov	27	9
GRE	Stefanos Tsitsipas	32	10
USA	Steve Johnson	34	11
RUS	Karen Khachanov	35	12
USA	Frances Tiafoe	42	13
FRA	Jérémy Chardy	43	14
GER	Mischa Zverev	45	15
RUS	Andrey Rublev	46	16

- ^{1} Rankings are as of July 23, 2018

=== Other entrants ===
The following players received wild cards into the main singles draw:

- (Russia) Daniil Medvedev
- (United States) Tommy Paul
- (United States) Noah Rubin
- (United States) Tim Smyczek
- (Switzerland) Stan Wawrinka

The following player received entry using a protected ranking:

- (Australia) James Duckworth

The following players received entry from the singles qualifying draw:

- (Australia) Alex Bolt
- (United States) Mitchell Krueger
- (United States) Thai-Son Kwiatkowski
- (France) Vincent Millot
- (Japan) Yosuke Watanuki
- (United States) Donald Young

The following player received entry as a lucky loser:

- (Australia) Jason Kubler

=== Withdrawals ===
Before the tournament

- (South Africa) Kevin Anderson → replaced by (Poland) Hubert Hurkacz
- (Czech Republic) Tomáš Berdych → replaced by (United States) Mackenzie McDonald
- (India) Yuki Bhambri → replaced by (Australia) James Duckworth
- (Ukraine) Alexandr Dolgopolov → replaced by (Belarus) Ilya Ivashka
- (Australia) Nick Kyrgios → replaced by (Australia) Jason Kubler

During the tournament

- (United Kingdom) Andy Murray

=== Retirements ===
- (France) Vincent Millot

== ATP doubles main-draw entrants ==
=== Seeds ===
Country	Player	Country	Player	Rank^{1}	Seed
AUT	Oliver Marach	CRO	Mate Pavić	5	1
FIN	Henri Kontinen	AUS	John Peers	11	2
POL	Łukasz Kubot	BRA	Marcelo Melo	19	3
GBR	Jamie Murray	BRA	Bruno Soares	27	4

- ^{1} Rankings are as of July 23, 2018

=== Other entrants ===
The following pairs received wildcards into the doubles main draw:

- (United States) James Cerretani / (India) Leander Paes
- (United States) Denis Kudla / (United States) Frances Tiafoe

The following pair received entry from the doubles qualifying draw:

- (India) Divij Sharan / (New Zealand) Artem Sitak

=== Withdrawals ===
Before the tournament

- (Australia) Nick Kyrgios

During the tournament

- (Germany) Mischa Zverev

== WTA singles main-draw entrants ==
=== Seeds ===
Country	Player	Rank ^{1}	Seed
~~DEN~~	~~Caroline Wozniacki~~	~~2~~	~~1~~
USA	Sloane Stephens	3	2
JPN	Naomi Osaka	17	3
RUS	Ekaterina Makarova	30	4
SRB	Aleksandra Krunić	44	5
SUI	Belinda Bencic	45	6
CRO	Donna Vekić	46	7
KAZ	Yulia Putintseva	53	8

- ^{1} Rankings are as of July 23, 2018

=== Other entrants ===
The following players received wild cards into the main singles draw:

- ~~(Canada) Bianca Andreescu~~
- (United States) Bethanie Mattek-Sands
- (United Kingdom) Katie Swan

The following players received entry as a special exempt:

- (China) Zheng Saisai

The following players received entry from the qualifying draw:

- (United Kingdom) Harriet Dart
- (Ukraine) Anhelina Kalinina
- (United States) Allie Kiick
- (Russia) Sofya Zhuk

The following players received entry as lucky losers:

- (Belgium) Ysaline Bonaventure
- (Japan) Mayo Hibi

=== Withdrawals ===
Before the tournament

- (Canada) Bianca Andreescu → replaced by (Japan) Mayo Hibi
- (Kazakhstan) Zarina Diyas → replaced by (Australia) Olivia Rogowska
- (Belgium) Kirsten Flipkens → replaced by (Japan) Nao Hibino
- (Australia) Daria Gavrilova → replaced by (Russia) Natalia Vikhlyantseva
- (Italy) Camila Giorgi → replaced by (Hungary) Fanny Stollár
- (Chinese Taipei) Hsieh Su-wei → replaced by (China) Han Xinyun
- (Romania) Monica Niculescu → replaced by (United States) Kristie Ahn
- (Latvia) Anastasija Sevastova → replaced by (United Kingdom) Katie Boulter
- (Czech Republic) Barbora Strýcová → replaced by (Germany) Andrea Petkovic
- (Ukraine) Lesia Tsurenko → replaced by (United States) Caroline Dolehide
- (Denmark) Caroline Wozniacki → replaced by (Belgium) Ysaline Bonaventure

During the tournament

- (Japan) Nao Hibino

== WTA doubles main-draw entrants ==
=== Seeds ===
Country	Player	Country	Player	Rank^{1}	Seed
TPE	Chan Hao-ching	CHN	Yang Zhaoxuan	44	1
JPN	Shuko Aoyama	CZE	Renata Voráčová	87	2
CHN	Han Xinyun	CRO	Darija Jurak	182	3
CHI	Alexa Guarachi	NZL	Erin Routliffe	211	4

- ^{1} Rankings are as of July 23, 2018

=== Other entrants ===
The following pair received a wildcard into the doubles main draw:

- (United States) Nicole Hammond / (Czech Republic) Kristýna Nepivodová
- (United States) Alana Smith / (United States) Natasha Subhash

The following pair received entry as alternates:

- (United Kingdom) Katie Swan / (Netherlands) Rosalie van der Hoek

=== Withdrawals ===
Before the tournament

- (Kazakhstan) Galina Voskoboeva
- (China) Zheng Saisai
