= 2016 Abierto Tampico – Doubles =

Doubles
- 2016 Abierto Tampico

Final
- Champions: (Romania) Mihaela Buzărnescu (Belgium) Elise Mertens
- Runners-up: (United States) Usue Maitane Arconada (United Kingdom) Katie Swan
- Score: 6–0, 6–2

Events
Singles	Doubles
← 2015 ·	Abierto Tampico	· 2017 →

María Irigoyen and Barbora Krejčíková were the defending champions, but chose not to participate.

Mihaela Buzărnescu and Elise Mertens won the title, defeating Usue Maitane Arconada and Katie Swan in the final, 6–0, 6–2.

== Seeds ==
1. (Romania) Mihaela Buzărnescu / (Belgium) Elise Mertens (champions)
2. (Slovenia) Dalila Jakupović / (Germany) Anna Zaja (first round, withdrew)
3. (Argentina) Catalina Pella / (Argentina) Nadia Podoroska (semifinals)
4. (Mexico) Victoria Rodríguez / (Mexico) Ana Sofía Sánchez (quarterfinals)

== Draw ==
=== Key ===
- Q = Qualifier
- WC = Wild card
- LL = Lucky loser
- Alt = Alternate
- SE = Special exempt
- PR = Protected ranking
- ITF = ITF entry
- JE = Junior exempt
- w/o = Walkover
- r = Retired
- d = Defaulted
- SR = Special ranking

First round
1	(Romania) M Buzărnescu (Belgium) E Mertens	6	6
(United Kingdom) F Christie (United Kingdom) L Robson	4	1
(Mexico) K de la Luz Montalvo (United States) L Muma	1	0
(Germany) L Schaeder (United States) M Schmidt	6	6
4	(Mexico) V Rodríguez (Mexico) AS Sánchez	6	6
(United States) G Leake (Mexico) D Schekaiban	3	1
(Mexico) M Zacarías (Mexico) R Zarazúa	6	4	[10]
(United States) B Boren (Hungary) N Totka	2	6	[6]
(Mexico) KM de la Garza Valdez (United States) S Schenck	6	6
(Mexico) AE Vilchis Sánchez (Mexico) SP Vilchis Sánchez	0	0
(Mexico) BM Flores (Mexico) AR Villarreal	2	5
3	(Argentina) C Pella (Argentina) N Podoroska	6	7
(United States) UM Arconada (United Kingdom) K Swan	6	6
(Mexico) G Olmos (Mexico) N Urbina	2	3
(Russia) V Flink (Russia) A Pivovarova	w/o
2	(Slovenia) D Jakupović (Germany) A Zaja

Quarterfinals
1	(Romania) M Buzărnescu (Belgium) E Mertens	6	6
(Germany) L Schaeder (United States) M Schmidt	3	1
4	(Mexico) V Rodríguez (Mexico) AS Sánchez	1	6	[4]
(Mexico) M Zacarías (Mexico) R Zarazúa	6	3	[10]
(Mexico) KM de la Garza Valdez (United States) S Schenck	1	0
3	(Argentina) C Pella (Argentina) N Podoroska	6	6
(United States) UM Arconada (United Kingdom) K Swan	7^{7}	7
(Russia) V Flink (Russia) A Pivovarova	6^{5}	5

Semifinals
1	(Romania) M Buzărnescu (Belgium) E Mertens	6	6
(Mexico) M Zacarías (Mexico) R Zarazúa	3	3
3	(Argentina) C Pella (Argentina) N Podoroska	6	4	[9]
(United States) UM Arconada (United Kingdom) K Swan	4	6	[11]

Final
1	(Romania) M Buzărnescu (Belgium) E Mertens	6	6
(United States) UM Arconada (United Kingdom) K Swan	0	2
