= 2016 Abierto Tampico – Singles =

Singles
- 2016 Abierto Tampico

Final
- Champion: (Russia) Sofya Zhuk
- Runner-up: (Russia) Varvara Flink
- Score: 6–4, 6–3

Events
Singles	Doubles
← 2015 ·	Abierto Tampico	· 2017 →

Lourdes Domínguez Lino was the defending champion, but chose not to participate.

Sofya Zhuk won the title, defeating Varvara Flink in an all-Russian final, 6–4, 6–3.

== Seeds ==
1. (Belgium) Elise Mertens (semifinals)
2. (Slovenia) Dalila Jakupović (second round)
3. (Canada) Françoise Abanda (withdrew)
4. (Russia) Anastasia Pivovarova (second round)
5. (Argentina) Catalina Pella (second round)
6. (Argentina) Nadia Podoroska (quarterfinals)
7. (Japan) Mayo Hibi (first round)
8. (United Kingdom) Laura Robson (first round)

== Main draw ==
=== Key ===
- Q = Qualifier
- WC = Wild card
- LL = Lucky loser
- Alt = Alternate
- SE = Special exempt
- PR = Protected ranking
- ITF = ITF entry
- JE = Junior exempt
- w/o = Walkover
- r = Retired
- d = Defaulted
- SR = Special ranking

=== Finals ===
Semifinals
1	(Belgium) Elise Mertens	4	2
(Russia) Varvara Flink	6	6
(Mexico) Victoria Rodríguez	3	3
WC	(Russia) Sofya Zhuk	6	6

Final
(Russia) Varvara Flink	4	3
WC	(Russia) Sofya Zhuk	6	6

=== Top half ===
First round
1	(Belgium) E Mertens	6	6
LL	(Mexico) K de la Luz Montalvo	0	0
Q	(United States) N Coopersmith	6	6
Q	(United States) M Schmidt	1	0
(Germany) A Zaja	7	6^{5}	1^{r}
Q	(United States) H Chang	5	7^{7}	5
JE	(United Kingdom) K Swan	6	7
7	(Japan) M Hibi	1	5
4	(Russia) A Pivovarova	6	6
WC	(Mexico) N Urbina	2	2
(Russia) V Flink	6	3
(United Kingdom) K Boulter	0	2^{r}
WC	(Mexico) M Zacarías	3	4
(Mexico) R Zarazúa	6	6
(United States) UM Arconada	6	6
8	(United Kingdom) L Robson	4	1

Second round
1	(Belgium) E Mertens	6	6
Q	(United States) N Coopersmith	0	1
Q	(United States) H Chang	7^{8}	6^{5}	4
JE	(United Kingdom) K Swan	6^{6}	7^{7}	6
4	(Russia) A Pivovarova	1	3
(Russia) V Flink	6	6
(Mexico) R Zarazúa	1	1
(United States) UM Arconada	6	6

Quarterfinals
1	(Belgium) E Mertens	6	6
JE	(United Kingdom) K Swan	2	2
(Russia) V Flink	6	6
(United States) UM Arconada	1	3

Semifinals
1	(Belgium) E Mertens	4	2
(Russia) V Flink	6	6

=== Bottom half ===
First round
5	(Argentina) C Pella	7	6
(Mexico) AS Sánchez	5	2
(Romania) M Buzărnescu	7^{7}	3	2
(Mexico) V Rodríguez	6^{5}	6	6
(United Kingdom) F Christie	6	6
Q	(Hungary) N Totka	2	4
LL	(Mexico) AR Villarreal	6	6
LL	(United States) E Raszkiewicz	3	0
6	(Argentina) N Podoroska	3	6	6
WC	(Mexico) G Olmos	6	3	3
(United States) L Albanese	7	6
(Hungary) F Stollár	5	2
(Germany) L Schaeder	6	3	3
WC	(Russia) S Zhuk	3	6	6
(Czech Republic) M Bouzková	7	1	1
2	(Slovenia) D Jakupović	5	6	6

Second round
5	(Argentina) C Pella	1	7	6^{4}
(Mexico) V Rodríguez	6	5	7^{7}
(United Kingdom) F Christie	6	6
LL	(Mexico) AR Villarreal	4	1
6	(Argentina) N Podoroska	6	6
(United States) L Albanese	3	3
WC	(Russia) S Zhuk	6	6
2	(Slovenia) D Jakupović	4	3

Quarterfinals
(Mexico) V Rodríguez	6	0
(United Kingdom) F Christie	3	0^{r}
6	(Argentina) N Podoroska	3	2
WC	(Russia) S Zhuk	6	6

Semifinals
(Mexico) V Rodríguez	3	3
WC	(Russia) S Zhuk	6	6
