= 2014 Abierto Tampico =

- Date: 13–19 October
- Edition: 2nd
- Category: ITF Women's Circuit
- Prize money: $50,000
- Surface: Hard
- Location: Tampico, Mexico

Champions

Singles
- (Colombia) Mariana Duque

Doubles
- (Croatia) Petra Martić / (United States) Maria Sanchez
← 2013 ·	Abierto Tampico	· 2015 →

The 2014 Abierto Tampico was a professional tennis tournament played on outdoor hard courts. It was the second edition of the tournament which was part of the 2014 ITF Women's Circuit, offering a total of $50,000 in prize money. It took place in Tampico, Mexico, on 13–19 October 2014.

== Singles entrants ==
=== Seeds ===
Country	Player	Rank^{1}	Seed
ESP	Lourdes Domínguez Lino	121	1
USA	Irina Falconi	123	2
BEL	An-Sophie Mestach	147	3
COL	Mariana Duque	153	4
ARG	María Irigoyen	164	5
ISR	Julia Glushko	167	6
NED	Arantxa Rus	182	7
ROU	Alexandra Cadanțu	195	8

- ^{1} Rankings as of 6 October 2014

=== Other entrants ===
The following players received wildcards into the singles main draw:

- (Mexico) Carolina Betancourt
- (Mexico) Victoria Rodríguez
- (Mexico) Ana Sofía Sánchez
- (Mexico) Marcela Zacarías

The following players received entry from the qualifying draw:

- (Spain) Paula Badosa
- (Ukraine) Kateryna Bondarenko
- (Czech Republic) Petra Krejsová
- (Spain) Laura Pous Tió

The following player received entry as a special exempt:

- (Romania) Patricia Maria Țig

== Champions ==
=== Singles ===
- (Colombia) Mariana Duque def. (Belgium) An-Sophie Mestach 3–6, 6–1, 7–6^{(7–4)}

=== Doubles ===
- (Croatia) Petra Martić / (United States) Maria Sanchez def. (Ukraine) Kateryna Bondarenko / (Russia) Valeria Savinykh 3–6, 6–3, [10–2]
