= 2015 Abierto Tampico – Singles =

Singles
- 2015 Abierto Tampico

Final
- Champion: (Spain) Lourdes Domínguez Lino
- Runner-up: (France) Alizé Lim
- Score: 7–5, 6–4

Events
Singles	Doubles
← 2014 ·	Abierto Tampico	· 2016 →

Mariana Duque was the defending champion, but chose to participate in Beijing instead.

Lourdes Domínguez Lino won the title, defeating Alizé Lim in the final, 7–5, 6–4.

== Seeds ==
1. (Germany) Tatjana Maria (first round)
2. (Spain) Lourdes Domínguez Lino (champion)
3. (Spain) Sílvia Soler Espinosa (second round)
4. (France) Pauline Parmentier (second round)
5. (Belgium) Ysaline Bonaventure (second round)
6. (Czech Republic) Barbora Krejčíková (first round)
7. (Paraguay) Verónica Cepede Royg (first round)
8. (Turkey) İpek Soylu (first round)

== Main draw ==
=== Key ===
- Q = Qualifier
- WC = Wild card
- LL = Lucky loser
- Alt = Alternate
- SE = Special exempt
- PR = Protected ranking
- ITF = ITF entry
- JE = Junior exempt
- w/o = Walkover
- r = Retired
- d = Defaulted
- SR = Special ranking

=== Finals ===
Semifinals
(United States) Grace Min	3	6^{8}
(France) Alizé Lim	6	7^{10}
LL	(Italy) Martina Caregaro	3	2
2	(Spain) Lourdes Domínguez Lino	6	6

Final
(France) Alizé Lim	5	4
2	(Spain) Lourdes Domínguez Lino	7	6

=== Top half ===
First round
1	(Germany) T Maria	4	2
(United States) K Ahn	6	6
WC	(Mexico) AS Sánchez	6	5	7
(Brazil) G Cé	2	7	5
Q	(Slovenia) T Majerič	0	2
Q	(United Kingdom) T Moore	6	6
(United States) G Min	7^{7}	6
6	(Czech Republic) B Krejčíková	6^{2}	4
4	(France) P Parmentier	6	6
(Argentina) M Irigoyen	4	4
Q	(Switzerland) C Perrin	3	1
(France) A Lim	6	6
Q	(Italy) A Matteucci	6	7
WC	(Canada) A Wozniak	2	5
(Russia) M Melnikova	6	6
7	(Paraguay) V Cepede Royg	4	3

Second round
(United States) K Ahn	3	6	6
WC	(Mexico) AS Sánchez	6	3	3
Q	(United Kingdom) T Moore	2	0
(United States) G Min	6	6
4	(France) P Parmentier	5	7^{7}	4
(France) A Lim	7	6^{5}	6
Q	(Italy) A Matteucci	7	7
(Russia) M Melnikova	5	5

Quarterfinals
(United States) K Ahn	6	1	0^{r}
(United States) G Min	1	6	1
(France) A Lim	7^{7}	6
Q	(Italy) A Matteucci	6^{3}	1

Semifinals
(United States) G Min	3	6^{8}
(France) A Lim	6	7^{10}

=== Bottom half ===
First round
5	(Belgium) Y Bonaventure	7	6
(Mexico) M Zacarías	5	3
(Mexico) V Rodríguez	7	6
(Argentina) P Ormaechea	5	2
(United States) M Sanchez	3	2
LL	(Italy) M Caregaro	6	6
(Netherlands) I de Vroome	3	3
3	(Spain) S Soler Espinosa	6	6
8	(Turkey) İ Soylu	3	7	2
WC	(Argentina) N Podoroska	6	5	6
(Slovenia) D Jakupović	0	2
(Czech Republic) B Štefková	6	6
(Bulgaria) A Naydenova	6	1	6
WC	(Mexico) R Zarazúa	0	6	4
(Belgium) E Mertens	2	3
2	(Spain) L Domínguez Lino	6	6

Second round
5	(Belgium) Y Bonaventure	5	4
(Mexico) V Rodríguez	7	6
LL	(Italy) M Caregaro	6	6
3	(Spain) S Soler Espinosa	4	3
WC	(Argentina) N Podoroska	7	6
(Czech Republic) B Štefková	5	2
(Bulgaria) A Naydenova	3	0
2	(Spain) L Domínguez Lino	6	6

Quarterfinals
(Mexico) V Rodríguez	4	2
LL	(Italy) M Caregaro	6	6
WC	(Argentina) N Podoroska	6^{0}	7	1
2	(Spain) L Domínguez Lino	7^{7}	5	6

Semifinals
LL	(Italy) M Caregaro	3	2
2	(Spain) L Domínguez Lino	6	6
