= 2018 Citi Open – Men's doubles =

Men's doubles
- 2018 Citi Open

Final
- Champions: (United Kingdom) Jamie Murray (Brazil) Bruno Soares
- Runners-up: (United States) Mike Bryan (France) Édouard Roger-Vasselin
- Score: 3–6, 6–3, [10–4]

Details
- Draw: 16
- Seeds: 4

Events
Singles	men	women
Doubles	men	women
- Washington Open

Henri Kontinen and John Peers were the defending doubles champions, but lost in the first round to Juan Sebastián Cabal and Robert Farah.

The fourth-seeded team of Jamie Murray and Bruno Soares won the title, defeating Mike Bryan and Édouard Roger-Vasselin in the final, 3–6, 6–3, [10–4].

== Seeds ==
1. (Austria) Oliver Marach / (Croatia) Mate Pavić (first round)
2. (Finland) Henri Kontinen / (Australia) John Peers (first round)
3. (Poland) Łukasz Kubot / (Brazil) Marcelo Melo (first round)
4. (United Kingdom) Jamie Murray / (Brazil) Bruno Soares (champions)

== Draw ==
Key

- Q = Qualifier
- WC = Wild card
- LL = Lucky loser
- Alt = Alternate
- ITF = ITF entry
- PR = Protected ranking
- SR = Special ranking
- SE = Special exempt
- JE = Junior exempt
- JR = Junior Accelerator Programme entrant
- CO = College Accelerator Programme entrant
- NG = Next Gen Accelerator Program entrant
- w/o = Walkover
- r = Retired
- d = Defaulted

=== Draw ===
First round
1	(Austria) O Marach (Croatia) M Pavić	1	4
(Germany) A Zverev (Germany) M Zverev	6	6
(United States) M Bryan (France) É Roger-Vasselin	6^{3}	7^{7}	[10]
(Croatia) N Mektić (Austria) A Peya	7^{7}	6^{5}	[5]
3	(Poland) Ł Kubot (Brazil) M Melo	4	5
(Croatia) I Dodig (Japan) B McLachlan	6	7
WC	(United States) D Kudla (United States) F Tiafoe	w/o
(France) J Chardy (Australia) N Kyrgios
WC	(United States) J Cerretani (India) L Paes	6^{2}	6	[7]
Q	(India) D Sharan (New Zealand) A Sitak	7^{7}	3	[10]
(Russia) K Khachanov (France) L Pouille	4	7	[7]
4	(United Kingdom) J Murray (Brazil) B Soares	6	5	[10]
(United States) R Ram (Netherlands) J-J Rojer	6^{4}	6^{6}
(South Africa) R Klaasen (New Zealand) M Venus	7^{7}	7^{8}
(Colombia) JS Cabal (Colombia) R Farah	6	6
2	(Finland) H Kontinen (Australia) J Peers	4	4

Quarterfinals
(Germany) A Zverev (Germany) M Zverev
(United States) M Bryan (France) É Roger-Vasselin	w/o
(Croatia) I Dodig (Japan) B McLachlan	4	7^{7}	[10]
WC	(United States) D Kudla (United States) F Tiafoe	6	6^{4}	[12]
Q	(India) D Sharan (New Zealand) A Sitak	6	1	[5]
4	(United Kingdom) J Murray (Brazil) B Soares	4	6	[10]
(South Africa) R Klaasen (New Zealand) M Venus	6^{4}	7^{7}	[10]
(Colombia) JS Cabal (Colombia) R Farah	7^{7}	6^{4}	[6]

Semifinals
(United States) M Bryan (France) É Roger-Vasselin	6	6
WC	(United States) D Kudla (United States) F Tiafoe	2	3
4	(United Kingdom) J Murray (Brazil) B Soares	7	7^{7}
(South Africa) R Klaasen (New Zealand) M Venus	5	6^{2}

Final
(United States) M Bryan (France) É Roger-Vasselin	6	3	[4]
4	(United Kingdom) J Murray (Brazil) B Soares	3	6	[10]

== Qualifying ==
=== Seeds ===
1. (India) Divij Sharan / (New Zealand) Artem Sitak (qualified)
2. (Belarus) Ilya Ivashka / (Russia) Daniil Medvedev (qualifying competition)

=== Qualifiers ===
1. (India) Divij Sharan / (New Zealand) Artem Sitak

=== Qualifying draw ===
First round				Qualifying competition
				1	(India) Divij Sharan (New Zealand) Artem Sitak	7	7^{8}
				2	(Belarus) Ilya Ivashka (Russia) Daniil Medvedev	5	6^{6}
WC	(United States) Jordan Chrysostom (United States) Trey Stinchcomb	3	3	2	(Belarus) Ilya Ivashka (Russia) Daniil Medvedev	5	6^{6}
2	(Belarus) Ilya Ivashka (Russia) Daniil Medvedev	6	6
