= 2014 Abierto Tampico – Doubles =

Doubles
- 2014 Abierto Tampico

Final
- Champions: (Croatia) Petra Martić (United States) Maria Sanchez
- Runners-up: (Ukraine) Kateryna Bondarenko (Russia) Valeria Savinykh
- Score: 3–6, 6–3, [10–2]

Events
Singles	Doubles
← 2013 ·	Abierto Tampico	· 2015 →

María Fernanda Álvarez Terán and María Irigoyen were the defending champions, having won the event in 2013, however Álvarez Terán chose not to participate. Irigoyen partnered Irina Falconi as the second seeds, but lost in the semifinals to Kateryna Bondarenko and Valeria Savinykh.

The top seeds Petra Martić and Maria Sanchez won the title, defeating Bondarenko and Savinykh in the final, 3–6, 6–3, [10–2].

== Seeds ==
1. (Croatia) Petra Martić / (United States) Maria Sanchez (champions)
2. (United States) Irina Falconi / (Argentina) María Irigoyen (semifinals)
3. (Romania) Alexandra Cadanțu / (Israel) Julia Glushko (first round)
4. (Latvia) Diāna Marcinkēviča / (Croatia) Ana Vrljić (first round)

== Draw ==
=== Key ===
- Q = Qualifier
- WC = Wild card
- LL = Lucky loser
- Alt = Alternate
- SE = Special exempt
- PR = Protected ranking
- ITF = ITF entry
- JE = Junior exempt
- w/o = Walkover
- r = Retired
- d = Defaulted
- SR = Special ranking

First round
1	(Croatia) P Martić (United States) M Sanchez	7^{8}	1	[10]
Alt	(Czech Republic) T Martincová (Croatia) S Njirić	6^{6}	6	[8]
(Czech Republic) P Krejsová (Slovakia) C Škamlová	2	3
WC	(Belgium) A-S Mestach (Brazil) L Pigossi	6	6
4	(Latvia) D Marcinkēviča (Croatia) A Vrljić	4	1
(United States) A Muhammad (United States) D Muresan	6	6
WC	(Spain) P Badosa (Spain) L Pous Tió	6	7^{7}
(Brazil) G Cé (Turkey) P Özgen	3	6^{3}
(Mexico) V Rodríguez (Mexico) M Zacarías	3	6	[5]
(Ukraine) K Bondarenko (Russia) V Savinykh	6	4	[10]
(Belgium) E Mertens (Netherlands) A Rus	4	6	[10]
3	(Romania) A Cadanțu (Israel) J Glushko	6	3	[6]
(Brazil) MF Alves (Slovakia) L Wienerová	4	0
(Paraguay) M González (Mexico) AS Sánchez	6	6
WC	(Mexico) C Betancourt (Romania) PM Țig	2	3
2	(United States) I Falconi (Argentina) M Irigoyen	6	6

Quarterfinals
1	(Croatia) P Martić (United States) M Sanchez	6	6
WC	(Belgium) A-S Mestach (Brazil) L Pigossi	2	2
(United States) A Muhammad (United States) D Muresan	6	5	[7]
WC	(Spain) P Badosa (Spain) L Pous Tió	3	7	[10]
(Ukraine) K Bondarenko (Russia) V Savinykh	6	6
(Belgium) E Mertens (Netherlands) A Rus	2	2
(Paraguay) M González (Mexico) AS Sánchez	7^{7}	6^{6}	[8]
2	(United States) I Falconi (Argentina) M Irigoyen	6^{3}	7^{8}	[10]

Semifinals
1	(Croatia) P Martić (United States) M Sanchez	6	3	[10]
WC	(Spain) P Badosa (Spain) L Pous Tió	1	6	[8]
(Ukraine) K Bondarenko (Russia) V Savinykh	6	5	[11]
2	(United States) I Falconi (Argentina) M Irigoyen	3	7	[9]

Final
1	(Croatia) P Martić (United States) M Sanchez	3	6	[10]
(Ukraine) K Bondarenko (Russia) V Savinykh	6	3	[2]
