= 2015 Abierto Tampico =

- Date: 5–11 October
- Edition: 3rd
- Category: ITF Women's Circuit
- Prize money: $50,000+H
- Surface: Hard
- Location: Tampico, Mexico

Champions

Singles
- (Spain) Lourdes Domínguez Lino

Doubles
- (Argentina) María Irigoyen / (Czech Republic) Barbora Krejčíková
← 2014 ·	Abierto Tampico	· 2016 →

The 2015 Abierto Tampico was a professional tennis tournament played on outdoor hard courts. It was the third edition of the tournament and part of the 2015 ITF Women's Circuit, offering a total of $50,000+H in prize money. It took place in Tampico, Mexico, on 5–11 October 2015.

== Singles main draw entrants ==
=== Seeds ===
Country	Player	Rank^{1}	Seed
GER	Tatjana Maria	70	1
ESP	Lourdes Domínguez Lino	96	2
ESP	Sílvia Soler Espinosa	138	3
FRA	Pauline Parmentier	139	4
BEL	Ysaline Bonaventure	146	5
CZE	Barbora Krejčíková	165	6
PAR	Verónica Cepede Royg	167	7
TUR	İpek Soylu	170	8

- ^{1} Rankings as of 28 September 2015

=== Other entrants ===
The following players received wildcards into the singles main draw:

- (Argentina) Nadia Podoroska
- (Mexico) Ana Sofía Sánchez
- (Canada) Aleksandra Wozniak
- (Mexico) Renata Zarazúa

The following players received entry from the qualifying draw:

- (Slovenia) Tadeja Majerič
- (Italy) Alice Matteucci
- (United Kingdom) Tara Moore
- (Switzerland) Conny Perrin

The following player received entry by a lucky loser spot:

- (Italy) Martina Caregaro

== Champions ==
=== Singles ===
- (Spain) Lourdes Domínguez Lino def. (France) Alizé Lim, 7–5, 6–4

=== Doubles ===
- (Argentina) María Irigoyen / (Czech Republic) Barbora Krejčíková def. (Paraguay) Verónica Cepede Royg / (Russia) Marina Melnikova, 7–5, 6–2
