= 2015 Abierto Tampico – Doubles =

Doubles
- 2015 Abierto Tampico

Final
- Champions: (Argentina) María Irigoyen (Czech Republic) Barbora Krejčíková
- Runners-up: (Paraguay) Verónica Cepede Royg (Russia) Marina Melnikova
- Score: 7–5, 6–2

Events
Singles	Doubles
← 2014 ·	Abierto Tampico	· 2016 →

Petra Martić and Maria Sanchez were the defending champions, but Martić chose not to participate. Sanchez partnered Elise Mertens, but lost in the semifinals to Verónica Cepede Royg and Marina Melnikova.

María Irigoyen and Barbora Krejčíková won the title, defeating Cepede Royg and Melnikova in the final, 7–5, 6–2.

== Seeds ==
1. (Argentina) María Irigoyen / (Czech Republic) Barbora Krejčíková (champions)
2. (Belgium) Elise Mertens / (United States) Maria Sanchez (semifinals)
3. (Germany) Tatjana Maria / (Mexico) Renata Zarazúa (first round; withdrew)
4. (Paraguay) Verónica Cepede Royg / (Russia) Marina Melnikova (final)

== Draw ==
=== Key ===
- Q = Qualifier
- WC = Wild card
- LL = Lucky loser
- Alt = Alternate
- SE = Special exempt
- PR = Protected ranking
- ITF = ITF entry
- JE = Junior exempt
- w/o = Walkover
- r = Retired
- d = Defaulted
- SR = Special ranking

First round
(Brazil) MF Alves (Latvia) D Marcinkēviča	4	4
(Bulgaria) A Naydenova (Czech Republic) B Štefková	6	6
3	(Germany) T Maria (Mexico) R Zarazúa
(Mexico) C Betancourt (Argentina) N Podoroska	w/o
(Mexico) V Rodríguez (Mexico) M Zacarías	4	2
(Chinese Taipei) C-y Hsu (United States) G Min	6	6
(Brazil) C Alves (Mexico) C Gorches	2	0
(Canada) P Januskova (Canada) A Wozniak	6	6
(Slovenia) D Jakupović (United Kingdom) T Moore	4	6	[6]
4	(Paraguay) V Cepede Royg (Russia) M Melnikova	6	4	[10]
(Argentina) P Ormaechea (Dominican Republic) F Segarelli	6	7
(Slovenia) T Majerič (Switzerland) C Perrin	2	5
(Brazil) G Cé (Mexico) AS Sánchez	5	2
2	(Belgium) E Mertens (United States) M Sanchez	7	6

Quarterfinals
1	(Argentina) M Irigoyen (Czech Republic) B Krejčíková	6	3	[10]
(Bulgaria) A Naydenova (Czech Republic) B Štefková	2	6	[7]
(Mexico) C Betancourt (Argentina) N Podoroska
(Chinese Taipei) C-y Hsu (United States) G Min	w/o
(Canada) P Januskova (Canada) A Wozniak	2	1
4	(Paraguay) V Cepede Royg (Russia) M Melnikova	6	6
(Argentina) P Ormaechea (Dominican Republic) F Segarelli	1	4
2	(Belgium) E Mertens (United States) M Sanchez	6	6

Semifinals
1	(Argentina) M Irigoyen (Czech Republic) B Krejčíková	6	6
(Chinese Taipei) C-y Hsu (United States) G Min	0	0
4	(Paraguay) V Cepede Royg (Russia) M Melnikova	6	7
2	(Belgium) E Mertens (United States) M Sanchez	4	5

Final
1	(Argentina) M Irigoyen (Czech Republic) B Krejčíková	7	6
4	(Paraguay) V Cepede Royg (Russia) M Melnikova	5	2
