= José Antonio Mexía =

Mexican politician

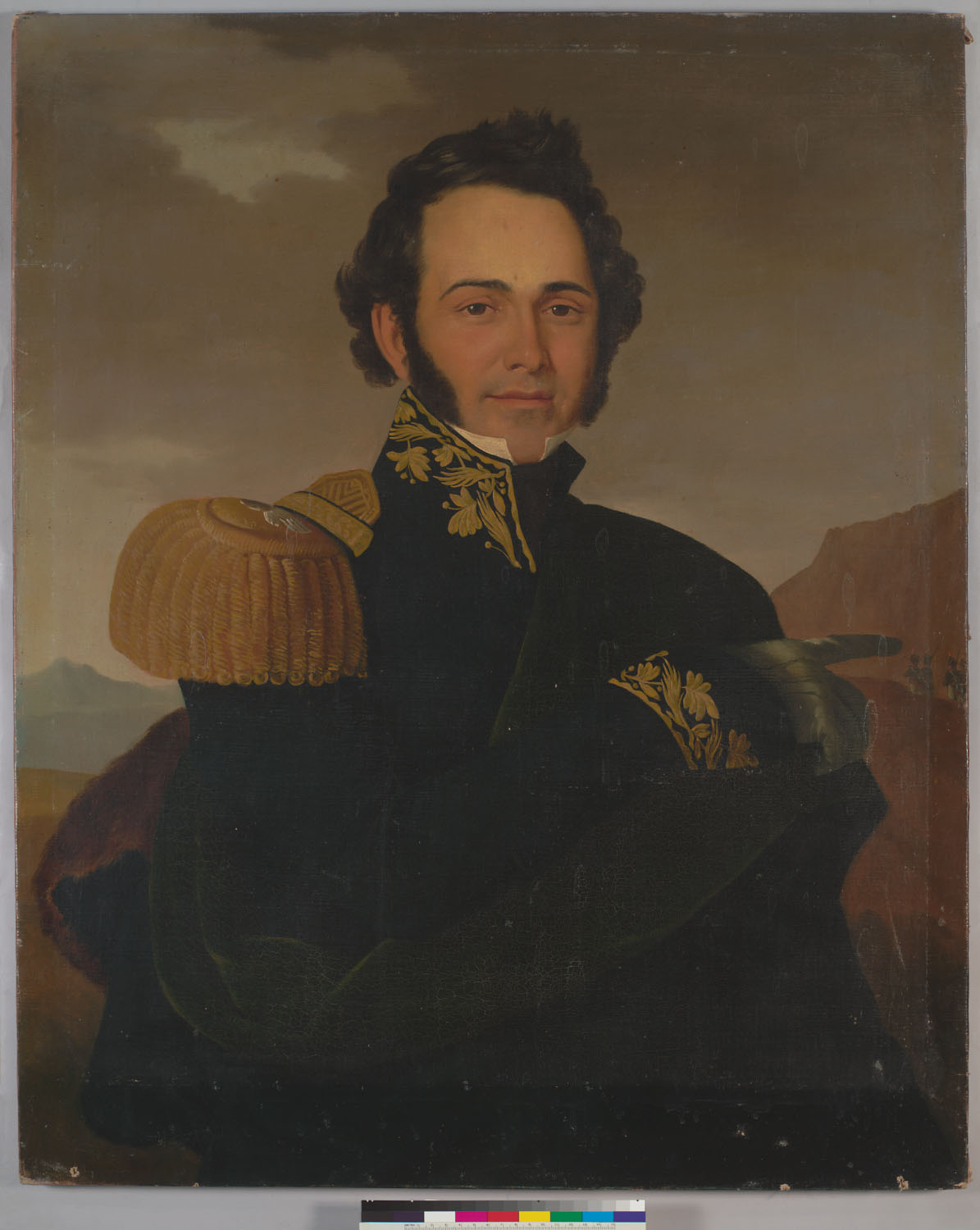
- Born: c. 31 December 1800; Xalapa, Veracruz
- Died: 3 May 1839 (aged 38); Hacienda La Blanca, near Acajete, Puebla
- Spouse: Charlotte Walker (m. 1823)
- Relatives: Ynés Enriquetta Julietta Mexía (granddaughter)
- Military career
- Allegiance: Mexican Army
- Rank: Brigadier general
- Conflicts: Mexía's Expedition; Tampico Expedition

José Antonio Mexía Hernández (Spanish pronunciation: [xoˈse anˈtonjo meˈxi.a eɾˈnandes]; c. 31 December 1800 – 3 May 1839) was a 19th-century Mexican general and politician. He served as secretary of the Legation of Mexico in Washington from about 1829 to 1831.

== Early life ==
He was born about 1800 to Pedro Mexía and his wife Juana Josefa Hernández, but his birthplace is debated. According to Mexía himself, his birthplace was Xalapa, Veracruz. Some historians cite records that put his place of birth as Cuba. Although details of his early life are scant, he lost his father and brother sometime in the Mexican War of Independence and fled to the United States where he became fluent in the English language.

== Career ==
By 1822, Mexía was back living in Mexico and working as an official interpreter for the Cherokee Nation, by appointment of Coahuila y Tejas president José Félix Trespalacios. Mexía became active in government service as Secretary of State for Tamaulipas and the Tuxpan customs collector. He spent two years as the grand secretary of the York Rite masons Grand Lodge of Mexico, an organization which some in Mexico viewed as having political undertones. Enlisting in the military, he quickly rose to the rank of brigadier general.

Mexía was originally a supporter of Antonio López de Santa Anna, who was elected President of Mexico on a Federalist platform. (Note: In 19th century Mexico, Federalism was the empowerment of local governments, while Centralism sought to eliminate local political power and give it all to the national government.) During Mexía's 1832 expedition, he traveled to Texas to quell the rebellion started by the Anahuac Disturbances. As a senator for the state of México, he participated in an 1834 uprising against President Santa Anna, who had changed his politics to centralism. Two months later, he was captured by centralist forces in Jalisco and sent into exile.

He traveled to New Orleans, Louisiana, where he encouraged American filibusters to invade Mexico, recruiting Anglo settlers under the guise of brokering land for them. On November 6, 1835, the schooner Mary Jane set sail for Tampico, Tamaulipas, in the Tampico Expedition. The Americans, realizing they had been tricked, did not support Mexía's plan of inciting another uprising against Santa Anna. Thirty-one men were taken as prisoners, but Mexía managed to escape to Texas. Santa Anna ordered the execution of the prisoners. Three died from illness.

In 1839, Mexía joined General José de Urrea's rebellion against Santa Anna and was defeated and captured at the Battle of Acajete. For his participation in the rebellion. Mexía was executed by firing squad on May 3, 1839.

== Legacy ==
The town of Mexia, Texas, in Limestone County is part of multiple large land tracts granted to the Mexía family in 1833 by the government of Coahuila y Tejas. When the town was laid out in the 1870s, it was given the Mexía family name.

== See also ==
- Timeline of the Texas Revolution
- Mexia, Texas
