= 2017 Abierto Tampico =

- Date: 18–24 September
- Edition: 5th
- Category: ITF Women's Circuit
- Prize money: $100,000+H
- Surface: Hard
- Location: Tampico, Mexico

Champions

Singles
- (United States) Irina Falconi

Doubles
- (United States) Caroline Dolehide / (Argentina) María Irigoyen
- Abierto Tampico

The 2017 Abierto Tampico was a professional tennis tournament played on outdoor hard courts. It was the fifth edition of the tournament and was part of the 2017 ITF Women's Circuit. It took place in Tampico, Mexico, on 18–24 September 2017.

== Singles main draw entrants ==
=== Seeds ===
Country	Player	Rank^{1}	Seed
USA	Jennifer Brady	65	1
GBR	Naomi Broady	135	2
USA	Jamie Loeb	149	3
USA	Louisa Chirico	152	4
USA	Caroline Dolehide	161	5
SVK	Anna Karolína Schmiedlová	164	6
CRO	Ajla Tomljanović	179	7
SRB	Ivana Jorović	187	8

- ^{1} Rankings as of 11 September 2017.

=== Other entrants ===
The following players received a wildcard into the singles main draw:

- (South Africa) Zoë Kruger
- (Mexico) María José Portillo Ramírez
- (Poland) Urszula Radwańska
- (Hungary) Fanny Stollár

The following players received entry from the qualifying draw:

- (Spain) Aliona Bolsova Zadoinov
- (United States) Maria Mateas
- (United States) Alexandra Morozova
- (Brazil) Luisa Stefani

The following player received entry as a lucky loser:

- (Canada) Catherine Leduc

== Champions ==
=== Singles ===
- (United States) Irina Falconi def. (United States) Louisa Chirico, 7–5, 6–7^{(3–7)}, 6–1

=== Doubles ===
- (United States) Caroline Dolehide / (Argentina) María Irigoyen def. (United States) Kaitlyn Christian / (Mexico) Giuliana Olmos, 6–4, 6–4
