= 2018 Citi Open – Women's singles =

Women's singles
- 2018 Citi Open

Final
- Champion: (Russia) Svetlana Kuznetsova
- Runner-up: (Croatia) Donna Vekić
- Score: 4–6, 7–6^{(9–7)}, 6–2

Details
- Draw: 32
- Seeds: 8

Events
Singles	men	women
Doubles	men	women
- Citi Open

Ekaterina Makarova was the defending singles champion, but lost in the first round to Ana Bogdan.

Unseeded Svetlana Kuznetsova won the title, beating Donna Vekić in the final, 4–6, 7–6^{(9–7)}, 6–2, despite being four match points down in the second set.

== Seeds ==
1. (Denmark) Caroline Wozniacki (withdrew due to leg injury)
2. (United States) Sloane Stephens (second round)
3. (Japan) Naomi Osaka (second round)
4. (Russia) Ekaterina Makarova (first round)
5. (Serbia) Aleksandra Krunić (first round)
6. (Switzerland) Belinda Bencic (quarterfinals)
7. (Croatia) Donna Vekić (final)
8. (Kazakhstan) Yulia Putintseva (quarterfinals)

== Draw ==
Key

- Q = Qualifier
- WC = Wild card
- LL = Lucky loser
- Alt = Alternate
- ITF = ITF entry
- PR = Protected ranking
- SR = Special ranking
- SE = Special exempt
- JE = Junior exempt
- JR = Junior Accelerator Programme entrant
- CO = College Accelerator Programme entrant
- NG = Next Gen Accelerator Program entrant
- w/o = Walkover
- r = Retired
- d = Defaulted

=== Finals ===
Semifinals
SE	(China) Zheng Saisai	5	3
7	(Croatia) Donna Vekić	7	6
(Russia) Svetlana Kuznetsova	6	6
(Germany) Andrea Petkovic	2	2

Final
7	(Croatia) Donna Vekić	6	6^{7}	2
(Russia) Svetlana Kuznetsova	4	7^{9}	6

=== Top half ===
First round
LL	(Belgium) Y Bonaventure	6	6
Q	(Ukraine) A Kalinina	3	3
WC	(United Kingdom) K Swan	2	4
SE	(China) S Zheng	6	6
Q	(United States) A Kiick	6	6
(China) X Han	2	3
(United Kingdom) K Boulter	6	6
5	(Serbia) A Krunić	2	0
3	(Japan) N Osaka	6	7^{7}
(United States) B Pera	2	6^{4}
(Poland) M Linette	6	6
(Australia) O Rogowska	4	1
LL	(Japan) M Hibi	1	6^{6}
(Hungary) F Stollár	6	7^{8}
(United States) C Dolehide	3	4
7	(Croatia) D Vekić	6	6

Second round
LL	(Belgium) Y Bonaventure	4	4
SE	(China) S Zheng	6	6
Q	(United States) A Kiick	6	5	6
(United Kingdom) K Boulter	4	7	1
3	(Japan) N Osaka	2	6	3
(Poland) M Linette	6	3	6
(Hungary) F Stollár	2	6	6^{13}
7	(Croatia) D Vekić	6	3	7^{15}

Quarterfinals
SE	(China) S Zheng	6	6
Q	(United States) A Kiick	3	1
(Poland) M Linette	1	6^{0}
7	(Croatia) D Vekić	6	7^{7}

Semifinals
SE	(China) S Zheng	5	3
7	(Croatia) D Vekić	7	6

=== Bottom half ===
First round
8	(Kazakhstan) Y Putintseva	6	3	6
(Germany) T Maria	3	6	4
(United States) J Brady	6	6
(Russia) N Vikhlyantseva	1	4
(Russia) S Kuznetsova	6	6
(United States) K Ahn	2	1
(Romania) A Bogdan	7^{7}	6
4	(Russia) E Makarova	6^{2}	3
6	(Switzerland) B Bencic	7	6
Q	(United Kingdom) H Dart	5	2
(Japan) N Hibino	7	6
Q	(Russia) S Zhuk	5	4
(United States) J Loeb	1	1
(Germany) A Petkovic	6	6
WC	(United States) B Mattek-Sands	5	4
2	(United States) S Stephens	7	6

Second round
8	(Kazakhstan) Y Putintseva	7	6
(United States) J Brady	5	2
(Russia) S Kuznetsova	6	6
(Romania) A Bogdan	2	1
6	(Switzerland) B Bencic	w/o
(Japan) N Hibino
(Germany) A Petkovic	2	6	6
2	(United States) S Stephens	6	4	2

Quarterfinals
8	(Kazakhstan) Y Putintseva	2	2
(Russia) S Kuznetsova	6	6
6	(Switzerland) B Bencic	3	6	6^{8}
(Germany) A Petkovic	6	2	7^{10}

Semifinals
(Russia) S Kuznetsova	6	6
(Germany) A Petkovic	2	2

== Qualifying ==
=== Seeds ===
1. (Belgium) Ysaline Bonaventure (qualifying competition, lucky loser)
2. (Ukraine) Anhelina Kalinina (qualified)
3. (Russia) Sofya Zhuk (qualified)
4. (United Kingdom) Harriet Dart (qualified)
5. (United States) Francesca Di Lorenzo (first round)
6. (Japan) Mayo Hibi (qualifying competition, lucky loser)
7. (United States) Allie Kiick (qualified)
8. (United States) Lauren Davis (first round)

=== Qualifiers ===
1. (United States) Allie Kiick
2. (Ukraine) Anhelina Kalinina
3. (Russia) Sofya Zhuk
4. (United Kingdom) Harriet Dart

=== Lucky losers ===
1. (Japan) Mayo Hibi
2. (Belgium) Ysaline Bonaventure

=== Draw ===
==== First qualifier ====
First round
1	(Belgium) Ysaline Bonaventure	6	7
(United States) Sophie Chang	4	5
(Russia) Nika Kukharchuk	2	0
7	(United States) Allie Kiick	6	6

Qualifying competition
1	(Belgium) Ysaline Bonaventure	1	0
7	(United States) Allie Kiick	6	6

==== Second qualifier ====
First round
2	(Ukraine) Anhelina Kalinina	6	6
(Bulgaria) Sesil Karatantcheva	4	1
(United States) Louisa Chirico	6	7^{7}
8	(United States) Lauren Davis	1	6^{2}

Qualifying competition
2	(Ukraine) Anhelina Kalinina	6	6
(United States) Louisa Chirico	3	4

==== Third qualifier ====
First round
3	(Russia) Sofya Zhuk	6	6
(Israel) Deniz Khazaniuk	4	3
WC	(United States) Natasha Subhash	0	1
6	(Japan) Mayo Hibi	6	6

Qualifying competition
3	(Russia) Sofya Zhuk	6	7^{7}
6	(Japan) Mayo Hibi	3	6^{3}

==== Fourth qualifier ====
First round
4	(United Kingdom) Harriet Dart	6	6
(Japan) Shuko Aoyama	1	0
Alt	(Chile) Alexa Guarachi	2	7	7
5	(United States) Francesca Di Lorenzo	6	5	5

Qualifying competition
4	(United Kingdom) Harriet Dart	6	6
Alt	(Chile) Alexa Guarachi	2	2
