= 2018 Citi Open – Men's singles =

Men's singles
- 2018 Citi Open

Final
- Champion: (Germany) Alexander Zverev
- Runner-up: (Australia) Alex de Minaur
- Score: 6–2, 6–4

Details
- Draw: 48 (6Q / 4WC)
- Seeds: 16

Events
Singles	men	women
Doubles	men	women
- Washington Open

Alexander Zverev was the defending champion and successfully defended his title, defeating Alex de Minaur in the final, 6–2, 6–4.

== Seeds ==
All seeds receive byes into the second round.

1. (Germany) Alexander Zverev (champion)
2. (United States) John Isner (second round)
3. (Belgium) David Goffin (quarterfinals)
4. (United Kingdom) Kyle Edmund (second round)
5. (Australia) Nick Kyrgios (withdrew)
6. (France) Lucas Pouille (third round)
7. (Japan) Kei Nishikori (quarterfinals)
8. (South Korea) Chung Hyeon (third round)

9. (Canada) Denis Shapovalov (third round)
10. (Greece) Stefanos Tsitsipas (semifinals)
11. (United States) Steve Johnson (second round)
12. (Russia) Karen Khachanov (second round)
13. (United States) Frances Tiafoe (third round)
14. (France) Jérémy Chardy (second round)
15. (Germany) Mischa Zverev (third round)
16. (Russia) Andrey Rublev (semifinals)

Click on the seed number of a player to go to their draw section.

== Draw ==
Key

- Q = Qualifier
- WC = Wild card
- LL = Lucky loser
- Alt = Alternate
- ITF = ITF entry
- PR = Protected ranking
- SR = Special ranking
- SE = Special exempt
- JE = Junior exempt
- JR = Junior Accelerator Programme entrant
- CO = College Accelerator Programme entrant
- NG = Next Gen Accelerator Program entrant
- w/o = Walkover
- r = Retired
- d = Defaulted

=== Finals ===
Quarterfinals
1	(Germany) Alexander Zverev	3	6	6
7	(Japan) Kei Nishikori	6	1	4
3	(Belgium) David Goffin	3	4
10	(Greece) Stefanos Tsitsipas	6	6
(Australia) Alex de Minaur	w/o
(United Kingdom) Andy Murray
(United States) Denis Kudla	1	4
16	(Russia) Andrey Rublev	6	6

Semifinals
1	(Germany) Alexander Zverev	6	6
10	(Greece) Stefanos Tsitsipas	2	4
(Australia) Alex de Minaur	5	7^{8}	6
16	(Russia) Andrey Rublev	7	6^{6}	4

Final
1	(Germany) Alexander Zverev	6	6
(Australia) Alex de Minaur	2	4

=== Top half ===
==== Section 1 ====
First round
(Russia) E Donskoy	4	1
(Tunisia) M Jaziri	6	6
WC	(United States) T Smyczek	7^{7}	6
(Lithuania) R Berankis	6^{4}	2
Q	(Japan) Y Watanuki	6	5	1
WC	(Russia) D Medvedev	3	7	6
WC	(Switzerland) S Wawrinka	4	7^{7}	6^{3}
Q	(United States) D Young	6	6^{5}	7^{7}

Second round
1	(Germany) A Zverev	6	6
(Tunisia) M Jaziri	2	1
WC	(United States) T Smyczek	2	6^{7}
15	(Germany) M Zverev	6	7^{9}
9	(Canada) D Shapovalov	3	6	6
WC	(Russia) D Medvedev	6	1	4
Q	(United States) D Young	3	4
7	(Japan) K Nishikori	6	6

Third round
1	(Germany) A Zverev	6	7
15	(Germany) M Zverev	3	5
9	(Canada) D Shapovalov	6^{1}	3
7	(Japan) K Nishikori	7^{7}	6

Quarterfinals
1	(Germany) A Zverev	3	6	6
7	(Japan) K Nishikori	6	1	4

==== Section 2 ====
First round
(France) P-H Herbert	7	6
Q	(United States) M Krueger	5	3
(Belarus) I Ivashka	4	3
(Poland) H Hurkacz	6	6
(United States) J Donaldson	6	7^{7}
(Australia) J Thompson	4	6^{4}
PR	(Australia) J Duckworth	6	7
Q	(United States) T-S Kwiatkowski	3	5

Second round
3	(Belgium) D Goffin	6	1	7^{7}
(France) P-H Herbert	2	6	6^{5}
(Poland) H Hurkacz	2	4
13	(United States) F Tiafoe	6	6
10	(Greece) S Tsitsipas	3	6	7
(United States) J Donaldson	6	3	5
PR	(Australia) J Duckworth	1	6	7^{7}
LL	(Australia) J Kubler	6	2	6^{5}

Third round
3	(Belgium) D Goffin	6	6
13	(United States) F Tiafoe	0	3
10	(Greece) S Tsitsipas	6	6
PR	(Australia) J Duckworth	3	4

Quarterfinals
3	(Belgium) D Goffin	3	4
10	(Greece) S Tsitsipas	6	6

=== Bottom half ===
==== Section 3 ====
First round
(Cyprus) M Baghdatis	6	3	6
(France) B Paire	3	6	2
(Canada) V Pospisil	7^{8}	2	3
(Australia) A de Minaur	6^{6}	6	6
(Bosnia and Herzegovina) M Bašić	6^{9}	4
(Romania) M Copil	7^{11}	6
(United States) M McDonald	6	4	5
(United Kingdom) A Murray	3	6	7

Second round
8	(South Korea) H Chung	6^{2}	6	6
(Cyprus) M Baghdatis	7^{7}	4	3
(Australia) A de Minaur	6	7
11	(United States) S Johnson	4	5
14	(France) J Chardy	4	4
(Romania) M Copil	6	6
(United Kingdom) A Murray	7^{7}	1	6
4	(United Kingdom) K Edmund	6^{4}	6	4

Third round
8	(South Korea) H Chung	2	6	2
(Australia) A de Minaur	6	4	6
(Romania) M Copil	7^{7}	3	6^{4}
(United Kingdom) A Murray	6^{5}	6	7^{7}

Quarterfinals
(Australia) A de Minaur	w/o
(United Kingdom) A Murray

==== Section 4 ====
First round
Q	(France) V Millot	6	6
(Japan) Y Sugita	3	2
(Slovakia) L Lacko	7^{7}	1	4
(United States) D Kudla	6^{3}	6	6
WC	(United States) T Paul	3	7^{7}	6
Q	(Australia) A Bolt	6	6^{0}	2
(Russia) M Youzhny	4	4
WC	(United States) N Rubin	6	6

Second round
6	(France) L Pouille	6^{2}	6	3
Q	(France) V Millot	7^{7}	4	0^{r}
(United States) D Kudla	6	6
12	(Russia) K Khachanov	2	3
16	(Russia) A Rublev	7^{7}	6
WC	(United States) T Paul	6^{5}	4
WC	(United States) N Rubin	6	7^{8}
2	(United States) J Isner	4	6^{6}

Third round
6	(France) L Pouille	5	7^{8}	6^{5}
(United States) D Kudla	7	6^{6}	7^{7}
16	(Russia) A Rublev	6	6
WC	(United States) N Rubin	3	2

Quarterfinals
(United States) D Kudla	1	4
16	(Russia) A Rublev	6	6

== Qualifying ==
=== Seeds ===
The top four seeds receive byes into the qualifying competition.

1. (Australia) Jason Kubler (qualifying competition, lucky loser)
2. (India) Ramkumar Ramanathan (qualifying competition)
3. (Chinese Taipei) Jason Jung (qualifying competition, retired)
4. (Australia) Alex Bolt (qualified)
5. (United States) Christopher Eubanks (qualifying competition)
6. (Canada) Filip Peliwo (first round)
7. (United States) Mitchell Krueger (qualified)
8. (United States) Donald Young (qualified)
9. (United States) Stefan Kozlov (first round)
10. (Japan) Yosuke Watanuki (qualified)
11. (France) Vincent Millot (qualified)
12. (Ukraine) Illya Marchenko (first round)

=== Qualifiers ===
1. (Japan) Yosuke Watanuki
2. (United States) Mitchell Krueger
3. (United States) Donald Young
4. (Australia) Alex Bolt
5. (France) Vincent Millot
6. (United States) Thai-Son Kwiatkowski

=== Lucky loser ===
1. (Australia) Jason Kubler

=== Qualifying draw ===
==== First qualifier ====
First round				Qualifying competition
				1	(Australia) Jason Kubler	4	4
				10	(Japan) Yosuke Watanuki	6	6
Alt	(United States) Patrick Kypson	5	3	10	(Japan) Yosuke Watanuki	6	6
10	(Japan) Yosuke Watanuki	7	6

==== Second qualifier ====
First round				Qualifying competition
				2	(India) Ramkumar Ramanathan	3	3
				7	(United States) Mitchell Krueger	6	6
WC	(United States) Andrew Fenty	6^{4}	1	7	(United States) Mitchell Krueger	6	6
7	(United States) Mitchell Krueger	7^{7}	6

==== Third qualifier ====
First round					Qualifying competition
					3	(Chinese Taipei) Jason Jung	7	5	0^{r}
					8	(United States) Donald Young	5	7	1
WC	(United States) Danny Thomas	6^{2}	6	2	8	(United States) Donald Young	5	7	1
8	(United States) Donald Young	7^{7}	4	6

==== Fourth qualifier ====
First round				Qualifying competition
				4	(Australia) Alex Bolt	7	6^{0}	7
				WC	(United States) Jared Hiltzik	5	7^{7}	5
WC	(United States) Jared Hiltzik	6	6	WC	(United States) Jared Hiltzik	5	7^{7}	5
9	(United States) Stefan Kozlov	3	3

==== Fifth qualifier ====
First round
5	(United States) Christopher Eubanks	6	6
WC	(United States) Ryan Shane	3	2
WC	(United States) Hunter Koontz	2	7^{8}	2
11	(France) Vincent Millot	6	6^{6}	6

Qualifying competition
5	(United States) Christopher Eubanks	5	4
11	(France) Vincent Millot	7	6

==== Sixth qualifier ====
First round
6	(Canada) Filip Peliwo	5	3
(France) Antoine Escoffier	7	6
(United States) Thai-Son Kwiatkowski	7^{8}	0	7
12/PR	(Ukraine) Illya Marchenko	6^{6}	6	5

Qualifying competition
(France) Antoine Escoffier	6	1	2^{r}
(United States) Thai-Son Kwiatkowski	3	6	5
