= Nicole Hammond =

American tennis player

- Country (sports): United States
- Born: April 26, 2001 (age 24) United States

Singles
- Career record: 0–0
- Career titles: 0

Doubles
- Career record: 0–1
- Career titles: 0
- Last updated on: July 27, 2018.

Nicole Hammond (born April 26, 2001) is an American tennis player.

She made her main draw debut at the 2018 Citi Open in doubles partnering with Kristýna Nepivodová. The pair qualified after winning the Wild Card Challenge tournament.

Hammond is verbally committed to playing college tennis at the University of Michigan.
