= 2014 Abierto Tampico – Singles =

Singles
- 2014 Abierto Tampico

Final
- Champion: (Colombia) Mariana Duque
- Runner-up: (Belgium) An-Sophie Mestach
- Score: 3–6, 6–1, 7–6^{(7–4)}

Events
Singles	Doubles
← 2013 ·	Abierto Tampico	· 2015 →

Indy de Vroome was the defending champion, having won the event in 2013, however she chose to participate in Makinohara instead.

Mariana Duque won the title, defeating An-Sophie Mestach in the final, 3–6, 6–1, 7–6^{(7–4)}.

== Seeds ==
1. (Spain) Lourdes Domínguez Lino (semifinals)
2. (United States) Irina Falconi (semifinals)
3. (Belgium) An-Sophie Mestach (final)
4. (Colombia) Mariana Duque (champion)
5. (Argentina) María Irigoyen (second round)
6. (Israel) Julia Glushko (quarterfinals)
7. (Netherlands) Arantxa Rus (quarterfinals)
8. (Romania) Alexandra Cadanțu (first round; retired)

== Main draw ==
=== Key ===
- Q = Qualifier
- WC = Wild card
- LL = Lucky loser
- Alt = Alternate
- SE = Special exempt
- PR = Protected ranking
- ITF = ITF entry
- JE = Junior exempt
- w/o = Walkover
- r = Retired
- d = Defaulted
- SR = Special ranking

=== Finals ===
Semifinals
1	(Spain) Lourdes Domínguez Lino	2	4
4	(Colombia) Mariana Duque	6	6
3	(Belgium) An-Sophie Mestach	6	6
2	(United States) Irina Falconi	4	1

Final
4	(Colombia) Mariana Duque	3	6	7^{7}
3	(Belgium) An-Sophie Mestach	6	1	6^{4}

=== Top half ===
First round
1	(Spain) L Domínguez Lino	6	7
WC	(Mexico) V Rodríguez	2	5
(Brazil) G Cé	6	6
(Croatia) A Vrljić	3	3
Q	(Spain) P Badosa	6	6
(Argentina) C Pella	1	4
(Canada) H El Tabakh	5	5
6	(Israel) J Glushko	7	7
4	(Colombia) M Duque	6	6
(Brazil) L Pigossi	2	1
(Brazil) PC Gonçalves	7^{7}	6
(Paraguay) M González	6^{4}	3
Q	(Ukraine) K Bondarenko	5	6	7^{7}
Q	(Czech Republic) P Krejsová	7	4	6^{4}
(Croatia) P Martić	4	0
5	(Argentina) M Irigoyen	6	6

Second round
1	(Spain) L Domínguez Lino	6	6
(Brazil) G Cé	4	3
Q	(Spain) P Badosa	4	2
6	(Israel) J Glushko	6	6
4	(Colombia) M Duque	6	6
(Brazil) PC Gonçalves	4	0
Q	(Ukraine) K Bondarenko	6	6
5	(Argentina) M Irigoyen	0	4

Quarterfinals
1	(Spain) L Domínguez Lino	1	6	6
6	(Israel) J Glushko	6	4	1
4	(Colombia) M Duque	3	7^{7}	6
Q	(Ukraine) K Bondarenko	6	6^{4}	2

Semifinals
1	(Spain) L Domínguez Lino	2	4
4	(Colombia) M Duque	6	6

=== Bottom half ===
First round
8	(Romania) A Cadanțu	0	3^{r}
SE	(Romania) PM Țig	6	4
(Turkey) P Özgen	0	2
(Latvia) D Marcinkēviča	6	6
(United States) M Sanchez	3	3
(United States) A Muhammad	6	6
(Belgium) E Mertens	3	4
3	(Belgium) A-S Mestach	6	6
7	(Netherlands) A Rus	6	6
(Serbia) D Erić	4	3
(Czech Republic) T Martincová	2	3
Q	(Spain) L Pous Tió	6	6
WC	(Mexico) C Betancourt	2	3
WC	(Mexico) M Zacarías	6	6
WC	(Mexico) AS Sánchez	2	1
2	(United States) I Falconi	6	6

Second round
SE	(Romania) PM Țig	7^{7}	6
(Latvia) D Marcinkēviča	6^{5}	3
(United States) A Muhammad	5	6	5
3	(Belgium) A-S Mestach	7	4	7
7	(Netherlands) A Rus	7	1	6
Q	(Spain) L Pous Tió	5	6	4
WC	(Mexico) M Zacarías	6	3	3
2	(United States) I Falconi	4	6	6

Quarterfinals
SE	(Romania) PM Țig	1	3
3	(Belgium) A-S Mestach	6	6
7	(Netherlands) A Rus	4	0
2	(United States) I Falconi	6	6

Semifinals
3	(Belgium) A-S Mestach	6	6
2	(United States) I Falconi	4	1
