= Kristýna Nepivodová =

Czech tennis player

- Country (sports): Czech Republic
- Born: March 21, 1989 Březnice, Czech Republic
- College: UDC

Singles
- Career record: 0–0
- Career titles: 0

Doubles
- Career record: 0–1
- Career titles: 0
- Last updated on: 31 July 2018.

Kristýna Nepivodová is a Czech tennis player.

Nepivodová made her WTA main draw debut at the 2018 Citi Open in the doubles draw partnering Nicole Hammond. She was coached by Chris Downs and Pedro Graber.

Nepivodová played college tennis at the University of the District of Columbia.
