= 2017 Abierto Tampico – Singles =

Singles
- 2017 Abierto Tampico

Final
- Champion: (United States) Irina Falconi
- Runner-up: (United States) Louisa Chirico
- Score: 7–5, 6–7^{(3–7)}, 6–1

Events
Singles	Doubles
- Abierto Tampico

Sofya Zhuk was the defending champion, but chose not to participate.

Irina Falconi won the title, defeating Louisa Chirico in the final, 7–5, 6–7^{(3–7)}, 6–1.

== Seeds ==
1. (United States) Jennifer Brady (semifinals)
2. (United Kingdom) Naomi Broady (first round)
3. (United States) Jamie Loeb (first round)
4. (United States) Louisa Chirico (final)
5. (United States) Caroline Dolehide (first round)
6. (Slovakia) Anna Karolína Schmiedlová (first round)
7. (Croatia) Ajla Tomljanović (first round)
8. (Serbia) Ivana Jorović (first round)

== Draw ==
Key

- Q = Qualifier
- WC = Wild card
- LL = Lucky loser
- Alt = Alternate
- ITF = ITF entry
- PR = Protected ranking
- SR = Special ranking
- SE = Special exempt
- JE = Junior exempt
- JR = Junior Accelerator Programme entrant
- CO = College Accelerator Programme entrant
- NG = Next Gen Accelerator Program entrant
- w/o = Walkover
- r = Retired
- d = Defaulted

=== Finals ===
Semifinals
1	(United States) Jennifer Brady	3	1
(United States) Irina Falconi	6	6
4	(United States) Louisa Chirico	6	7^{7}
Q	(Spain) Aliona Bolsova Zadoinov	2	6^{5}

Final
(United States) Irina Falconi	7	6^{3}	6
4	(United States) Louisa Chirico	5	7^{7}	1

=== Top half ===
First round
1	(United States) J Brady	6	6
(Mexico) R Zarazúa	4	2
(Spain) P Badosa Gibert	3	4
(Israel) D Khazaniuk	6	6
WC	(South Africa) Z Kruger	4	2
WC	(Poland) U Radwańska	6	6
(Mexico) G Olmos	6	7^{7}
5	(United States) C Dolehide	4	6^{3}
3	(United States) J Loeb	6	2	3
(Russia) A Potapova	4	6	6
(United States) C Van Nguyen	1	1
(United States) I Falconi	6	6
(Bulgaria) E Kostova	6^{6}	2
(Mexico) V Rodríguez	7^{8}	6
WC	(Hungary) F Stollár	6	6
6	(Slovakia) AK Schmiedlová	2	3

Second round
1	(United States) J Brady	6	6
(Israel) D Khazaniuk	3	4
WC	(Poland) U Radwańska	2	6	3
(Mexico) G Olmos	6	2	6
(Russia) A Potapova	4	7	6^{4}
(United States) I Falconi	6	5	7^{7}
(Mexico) V Rodríguez	7^{7}	6
WC	(Hungary) F Stollár	6^{3}	1

Quarterfinals
1	(United States) J Brady	6	7
(Mexico) G Olmos	1	5
(United States) I Falconi	6	6
(Mexico) V Rodríguez	1	2

Semifinals
1	(United States) J Brady	3	1
(United States) I Falconi	6	6

=== Bottom half ===
First round
7	(Croatia) A Tomljanović	6	3	3
(United States) UM Arconada	3	6	6
(Mexico) AS Sánchez	6	6
WC	(Mexico) MJ Portillo Ramírez	4	4
Q	(United States) A Morozova	3	2
Q	(Brazil) L Stefani	6	6
(Mexico) M Zacarías	2	0
4	(United States) L Chirico	6	6
8	(Serbia) I Jorović	4	6^{6}
Q	(United States) M Mateas	6	7^{8}
(United States) K Christian	2	1
Q	(Spain) A Bolsova Zadoinov	6	6
(United Kingdom) K Boulter	6	6
LL	(Canada) C Leduc	2	3
(United States) G Min	6	6
2	(United Kingdom) N Broady	1	0

Second round
(United States) UM Arconada	6	6
(Mexico) AS Sánchez	3	0
Q	(Brazil) L Stefani	3	1
4	(United States) L Chirico	6	6
Q	(United States) M Mateas	6^{5}	2
Q	(Spain) A Bolsova Zadoinov	7^{7}	6
(United Kingdom) K Boulter	3	6	6
(United States) G Min	6	3	2

Quarterfinals
(United States) UM Arconada	3	6^{7}
4	(United States) L Chirico	6	7^{9}
Q	(Spain) A Bolsova Zadoinov	6	6
(United Kingdom) K Boulter	4	0

Semifinals
4	(United States) L Chirico	6	7^{7}
Q	(Spain) A Bolsova Zadoinov	2	6^{5}
