= 2017 Abierto Tampico – Doubles =

Doubles
- 2017 Abierto Tampico

Final
- Champion: (United States) Caroline Dolehide (Argentina) María Irigoyen
- Runner-up: (United States) Kaitlyn Christian (Mexico) Giuliana Olmos
- Score: 6–4, 6–4

Events
Singles	Doubles
- Abierto Tampico

Mihaela Buzărnescu and Elise Mertens were the defending champions, but both players chose not to participate.

Caroline Dolehide and María Irigoyen won the title, defeating Kaitlyn Christian and Giuliana Olmos in the final, 6–4, 6–4.

== Seeds ==
1. (United States) Caroline Dolehide / (Argentina) María Irigoyen (champions)
2. (United States) Desirae Krawczyk / (United States) Jamie Loeb (semifinals)
3. (United States) Kaitlyn Christian / (Mexico) Giuliana Olmos (final)
4. (United Kingdom) Naomi Broady / (United States) Irina Falconi (quarterfinals)

== Draw ==
Key

- Q = Qualifier
- WC = Wild card
- LL = Lucky loser
- Alt = Alternate
- ITF = ITF entry
- PR = Protected ranking
- SR = Special ranking
- SE = Special exempt
- JE = Junior exempt
- JR = Junior Accelerator Programme entrant
- CO = College Accelerator Programme entrant
- NG = Next Gen Accelerator Program entrant
- w/o = Walkover
- r = Retired
- d = Defaulted

First round
1	(United States) C Dolehide (Argentina) M Irigoyen	6	6
(Trinidad and Tobago) Y Leacock (United States) A Riley	4	2
(Spain) A Bolsova Zadoinov (United States) A Morozova	5	7^{7}	[8]
(Mexico) V Rodríguez (United States) M Schmidt	7	6^{3}	[10]
4	(United Kingdom) N Broady (United States) I Falconi	6	6
(United States) J Kissell (Canada) C Leduc	1	2
(United States) M Mateas (United States) C Van Nguyen	2	1
(United States) UM Arconada (Brazil) L Stefani	6	6
(Mexico) AS Sánchez (Mexico) M Zacarías	6	1	[10]
(United States) L Chirico (United States) G Min	2	6	[6]
(Bulgaria) E Kostova (Russia) A Potapova	5	3
3	(United States) K Christian (Mexico) G Olmos	7	6
(Sweden) A Munozova (United States) S Nemtsova	0	6^{4}
WC	(Mexico) MJ Portillo Ramírez (United States) ZG Scandalis	6	7^{7}
(Croatia) A Tomljanović (Mexico) R Zarazúa
2	(United States) D Krawczyk (United States) J Loeb	w/o

Quarterfinals
1	(United States) C Dolehide (Argentina) M Irigoyen	6	6
(Mexico) V Rodríguez (United States) M Schmidt	4	4
4	(United Kingdom) N Broady (United States) I Falconi	2	3
(United States) UM Arconada (Brazil) L Stefani	6	6
(Mexico) AS Sánchez (Mexico) M Zacarías	2	4
3	(United States) K Christian (Mexico) G Olmos	6	6
WC	(Mexico) MJ Portillo Ramírez (United States) ZG Scandalis	2	1
2	(United States) D Krawczyk (United States) J Loeb	6	6

Semifinals
1	(United States) C Dolehide (Argentina) M Irigoyen	3	6	[10]
(United States) UM Arconada (Brazil) L Stefani	6	2	[8]
3	(United States) K Christian (Mexico) G Olmos	7	6
2	(United States) D Krawczyk (United States) J Loeb	5	4

Final
1	(United States) C Dolehide (Argentina) M Irigoyen	6	6
3	(United States) K Christian (Mexico) G Olmos	4	4
