= Siege of Tampico =

- Part of Mexican Federalist War
Date	3 June 1839
Location	Tampico, Tamaulipas
Result	Centralist victory

Belligerents
Centralists	Insurgents

Commanders and leaders
Mariano Arista	Ignacio Escalada (surrendered)

Strength
Unknown	Unknown

Casualties and losses
Unknown	Unknown

The siege of Tampico occurred during the Mexican Federalist War between the 26 May and 4 June 1839. The insurgents under the command of General Ignacio Escalada were besieged by Centralist forces under the command of General Mariano Arista. Escalada surrendered on the 4 June. The loss of the port was a major blow to the insurgency.
