= Tampico Expedition =

Military campaign in Mexico

The "Battle of Tampico" was fought November 15, 1835, in the Mexican state of Tamaulipas. Gregorio Gómez and the Mexican Centralist garrison engaged Gen. José Antonio Mexía and 150 American volunteers. This was part of an uprising against General Santa Anna, and its outcome affected the future of the Texas War of Independence.

== Background ==
After the Mexican Congress elected General Santa Anna as President of Mexico in 1833, he appointed Valentín Gómez Farías as his vice president and turned over much of the governing of Mexico to him. However, the Vice President began implementing liberal reforms, particularly impacting the Mexican Army and the Catholic Church. These reforms angered the powerful conservative forces, who urged Santa Anna to abandon his semi-retirement. Santa Anna agreed and led the reaction against liberalization, forcing Gómez Farías and his Federalist supporters to flee into exile in the United States.

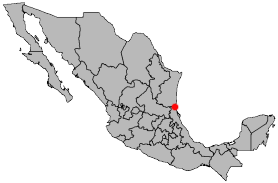
Locator map for Tampico, Mexico

When the revolt began in October 1835, a majority of the Texas colonists remained loyal to Mexico. "The Consultation", a meeting at San Felipe de Austin on November 7, 1835 resulted in a statement that the colonists were defending the republican principles of the Mexican Constitution of 1824. This statement emboldened Santa Anna's exiled opponents in the United States. Mexican General José Antonio Mexía and several other political opponents of Santa Anna's opponents fled to New Orleans, USA where they planned to resist the Centralist government. Mexia declared that capturing Tampico, Mexico would be a fatal stroke against that government.

== Voyage of the Mary Jane ==
In October 1835, Mexía raised a military force in New Orleans for the purpose of supporting Federalist opposition thought to be present in the Mexican state of Tamaulipas. On October 29, Mexia reported to Texian leaders that he had commissioned the armed schooner Mary Jane, to transport his expedition with a 12-pound cannonade and two eight-pound cannon. He added that there was a crew of fifty men, armed and provisioned for three months, plus 150 men ready for service on land. A subsequent report stated that the expedition contained a company of grenadiers with 52 men, a 42-man company of sharpshooters, 33 French and Creole volunteers known as the Company of Liberty and a marine corps consisting of 15 men. The latter included a captain, eight seamen, a first mate, a second mate, two cooks and two stewards.

The expedition departed from New Orleans on November 6, 1835. Richard Hall, master of the schooner Mary Jane had declared his destination to be Galveston and Matagorda. The cargo was reported as "...10 barrels of flour, 20 barrels of beef, 10 barrels of pork,6 barrels and 20 boxes of fish, 8 boxes of hardware and 20 boxes of potatoes." Five days after her departure, the ship encountered a storm that allegedly blew it off course. Only then did Mexia's staff tell the volunteers aboard the ship that the Mary Jane was bound for Tampico, not for Texas. It arrived at the bar off Tampico, at the mouth of the Panuco River, on November 14, When the pilot arrived to guide the ship into port, Mexia discovered that no one had told him about the ship's pending arrival. Before the ship passed the bar, a storm blew in and caused the vessel to run aground. The ship began taking on water, so Mexia ordered his men to throw some of the artillery and other supplies overboard, believing that lightening the load would free the ship.

Captain John M. Allen and Hall went ashore with six sailors to contact the fort that protected the port. The twenty-four man garrison not only quickly surrendered the fort and its three 24-pound cannon to Mexia's forces, they switched sides and joined the expedition.

== The Battle of Tampico ==
Mexia and 150 supporters waded ashore and spent some time drying out. On November 15, they attempted to capture that important port city. The bulk of the Tampico garrison, commanded by Gregorio Gomez Palomino, had remained loyal to the centralist government. Federalist supporters had already been crushed by the Centralists. They knew of Mexia's landing and fortified the Tampico customs house. They had also been reinforced by a company of the Tuxpan Battalion. Federalist supporters had already been crushed by the Centralists and the attack failed. The federalist troops made their way into Tampico and arrived at the customs house. Shooting began when a sentinel outside discovered the invaders. The garrison began firing with cannon, killing two of Mexia's men. The invaders rushed the cannon and killed three of the defenders. The battle lasted about two hours. Mexia's men captured the customs house and two pieces of artillery, forcing the defenders to retreat into a nearby fort. By then, most of the invaders' usable ammunition had been expended. Mexia then ordered a retreat.

Mexia and his supporters boarded an American schooner, the Halcyon, which took them to the mouth of the Brazos River.

== Aftermath ==
Thirty-one of the men who had arrived on the Mary Jane were taken prisoner. Three died of wounds and the remaining twenty-eight were executed on December 14, 1835.

Mexía's defeat convinced many Texians that Mexico's Federalists would be no help, thereby causing hard feelings to arise between these potential allies. Furthermore, the Mexican government declared that the expedition had been carried out by "pirates," executing the men Mexía left behind. This policy of "no quarter" was extended to the Texas situation in the pronouncement of the Tornel Decree.
