= Sofya Zhuk =

Russian tennis player

Sofya Slastikhin Софья Сластихин
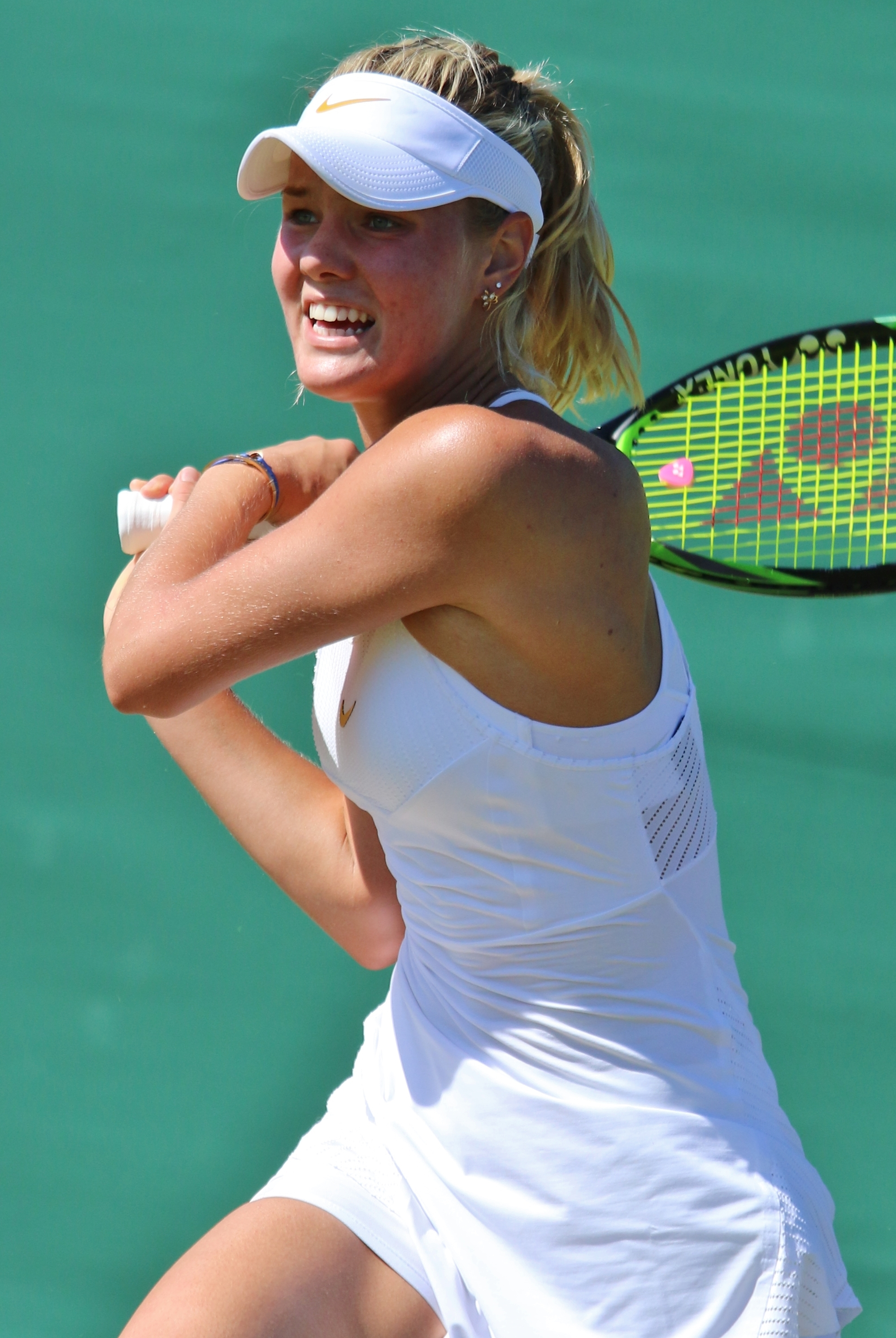
- Zhuk at the 2018 Wimbledon Championships
- Full name: Sofya Slastikhin
- Country (sports): Russia
- Residence: Miami, Florida, US
- Born: 1 December 1999 (age 26) Moscow, Russia
- Height: 1.77 m (5 ft 10 in)
- Retired: 2020
- Prize money: $398,717

Singles
- Career record: 123–66
- Career titles: 6 ITF
- Highest ranking: No. 116 (17 December 2018)

Grand Slam singles results
- Australian Open: Q2 (2018, 2019)
- French Open: 1R (2019)
- Wimbledon: Q3 (2018)
- US Open: 1R (2017)

Doubles
- Career record: 3–4

Sofya Andreyevna Zhuk (Russian: Софья Андреевна Жук, IPA: [ˈsofʲjə ɐnˈdrʲe(j)ɪvnə ˈʐuk]; born 1 December 1999) is a Russian former tennis player. She won the 2015 Wimbledon girls' singles title.

== Career ==
=== Early years ===
Zhuk trained at the Justine Henin Academy in Belgium and her coach was Olivier Jeunehomme until 2014-2015. From 2015 moved to USA and trained at IMG Academy. End of 2018 moved to Miami,Florida and trained with Patricia Tarabini. Her best win to date on the professional tour has been at a $60k tournament in Turkey, where she beat home favourite İpek Soylu in the final.

In 2014, she won her first tournament at Shymkent and became only the 17th 14-year-old in ITF history to win an open tournament at that age, joining a group which includes former world-number-ones, Justine Henin and Dinara Safina.

In 2015, Zhuk competed as an unseeded 15-year-old at Wimbledon, where she won the junior girls' title against fellow Russian and No. 12 ranked junior Anna Blinkova, in straight sets. Zhuk did not drop a set in the whole Wimbledon tournament. Zhuk became only the second Russian girl to win the Wimbledon title, following the 2002 final when Vera Dushevina defeated compatriot Maria Sharapova.

=== 2016 ===
She made her WTA Tour singles debut at the 2016 Miami Open, where she received a wildcard into the main draw. She lost in straight sets to Zhang Shuai in the first round.

=== 2018–19 ===
Zhuk reached the second round of qualifying at the Australian Open, losing to Magdalena Fręch of Poland, before heading to Newport Beach in California for their inaugural WTA 125 tournament. She reached her first $125k final in this event where, after taking the first set, she eventually fell to Danielle Collins, six years her senior, in three sets.

Collins was her nemesis again when they played at Indian Wells, after both had defeated seeded players. Zhuk recorded her first WTA Tour win when she defeated Alizé Cornet in the first round, and followed that by beating 18th seed Magdalena Rybarikova in the second round. Zhuk's second to last service game in that match took well over 20 minutes, with 12 deuces and 30 points. Rybarikova saved eleven match points during the game, before finally winning on only her second break point. Zhuk promptly broke back, and then served out to win in three sets. Collins, though having beaten 15th seed Madison Keys in the second round, always had the advantage in their third round clash, winning in straight sets. Zhuk nevertheless reached her career-high ranking of 123 after this defeat. She then went to the Premier Mandatory tournament in Miami, where she lost in the first round of qualifying.

In the European Grand Slam tournaments, she lost in the first qualifying round of the French Open to Valentini Grammatikopoulou, and in the final qualifying round for Wimbledon to Vitalia Diatchenko, having had her revenge on Grammatikopoulou in the first round.

=== 2020 ===
In 2020, Zhuk announced that she had paused her tennis career because of ongoing injury with possibility of coming back in the future.

== Performance timeline ==
Key
W	F	SF	QF	#R	RR	Q#	P#	DNQ	A	Z#	PO	G	S	B	NMS	NTI	P	NH

(W) winner; (F) finalist; (SF) semifinalist; (QF) quarterfinalist; (#R) rounds 4, 3, 2, 1; (RR) round-robin stage; (Q#) qualification round; (P#) preliminary round; (DNQ) did not qualify; (A) absent; (Z#) Davis/Fed Cup Zonal Group (with number indication) or (PO) play-off; (G) gold, (S) silver or (B) bronze Olympic/Paralympic medal; (NMS) not a Masters tournament; (NTI) not a Tier I tournament; (P) postponed; (NH) not held; (SR) strike rate (events won / competed); (W–L) win–loss record.
To avoid confusion and double counting, these charts are updated at the conclusion of a tournament or when the player's participation has ended.

=== Singles ===
Tournament	2017	2018	2019	2020	SR	W–L	Win%
Australian Open	A	Q2	Q2	A	0 / 0	0–0	–
French Open	A	Q1	1R	A	0 / 1	0–1	0%
Wimbledon	A	Q3	Q1	NH	0 / 0	0–0	–
US Open	1R	Q3	A	A	0 / 1	0–1	0%
Win–loss	0–1	0–0	0–1	0–0	0 / 2	0–2	0%

== WTA Challenger finals ==
=== Singles: 1 (runner-up) ===
Result	W–L	Date	Tournament	Surface	Opponent	Score
Loss	0–1	Jan 2018	Newport Beach Challenger, United States	Hard	(United States) Danielle Collins	6–2, 4–6, 3–6

== ITF Circuit finals ==
=== Singles: 9 (6 titles, 3 runner-ups) ===
Legend $50/60,000 tournaments (2–0) $25,000 tournaments (1–1) $10,000 tournaments (3–2)	Finals by surface Hard (2–3) Clay (4–0)

Result	W–L	Date	Tournament	Tier	Surface	Opponent	Score
Win	1–0	Oct 2014	ITF Shymkent, Kazakhstan	10,000	Clay	(Russia) Margarita Lazareva	6–2, 6–4
Loss	1–1	Feb 2016	ITF Sharm El Sheikh, Egypt	10,000	Hard	(Germany) Julia Wachaczyk	6–4, 4–6, 3–6
Win	2–1	Feb 2016	ITF Sharm El Sheikh, Egypt	10,000	Hard	(Bulgaria) Julia Terziyska	6–2, 6–1
Loss	2–2	Apr 2016	ITF Sharm El Sheikh, Egypt	10,000	Hard	(Georgia (country)) Mariam Bolkvadze	3–6, 5–7
Win	3–2	Aug 2016	ITF Cali, Colombia	10,000	Clay	(France) Harmony Tan	6–2, 6–4
Win	4–2	Oct 2016	Abierto Tampico, Mexico	50,000	Hard	(Russia) Varvara Flink	6–4, 6–3
Loss	4–3	Apr 2017	ITF Irapuato, Mexico	25,000	Hard	(Israel) Deniz Khazaniuk	w/o
Win	5–3	May 2017	ITF Naples, United States	25,000	Clay	(United States) Taylor Townsend	6–4, 7–6 ^{(3)}
Win	6–3	Jul 2017	Bursa Cup, Turkey	60,000	Clay	(Turkey) İpek Soylu	4–6, 6–3, 7–6^{(5)}

== Junior Grand Slam finals ==
=== Girls' singles: 1 (title) ===
Result	Year	Tournament	Surface	Opponent	Score
Win	2015	Wimbledon	Grass	(Russia) Anna Blinkova	7–5, 6–4

== Awards ==
2015

- The Russian Cup in the nomination Junior of the Year
