= Abierto Tampico =

WTA 125
- Event name: Abierto Tampico
- Founded: 2022
- Abolished: 2025
- Location: Tampico, Mexico
- Venue: Ciudad Deportiva de Tampico
- Category: WTA 125
- Surface: Hard
- Draw: 32S/13Q/14D
- Prize money: $115,000
- Website: Official website

Current champions (2025)
- Women's singles: (Belgium) Hanne Vandewinkel
- Women's doubles: (Canada) Kayla Cross (United Kingdom) Amelia Rajecki

The Abierto Tampico is a tournament for professional female tennis players played on outdoor hard courts. The event is classified as a WTA 125 event after it was upgraded in 2022. Before that, it used to be held as a $100,000+H ITF Women's Circuit tournament. The tournament was established in Tampico, Mexico, in 2013.

== Past finals ==
=== Singles ===
Year	Champion	Runner-up	Score
2026	Not held		
2025	(Belgium) Hanne Vandewinkel	(Canada) Cadence Brace	6–4, 6–3
2024	(Canada) Marina Stakusic	Anna Blinkova	6–4, 2–6, 6–4
2023	(United States) Emina Bektas	Anna Kalinskaya	6–3, 3–6, 7–6^{(7–3)}
2022	(Italy) Elisabetta Cocciaretto	(Poland) Magda Linette	7–6^{(7–5)}, 4–6, 6–1
⬆️ WTA 125 event ⬆️
2018–2021 not held
2017	(United States) Irina Falconi	(United States) Louisa Chirico	7–5, 6–7^{(3–7)}, 6–1
2016	(Russia) Sofya Zhuk	(Russia) Varvara Flink	6–4, 6–3
2015	(Spain) Lourdes Domínguez Lino	(France) Alizé Lim	7–5, 6–4
2014	(Colombia) Mariana Duque	(Belgium) An-Sophie Mestach	3–6, 6–1, 7–6^{(7–4)}
2013	(Netherlands) Indy de Vroome	(Serbia) Doroteja Erić	6–4, 6–3

=== Doubles ===
Year	Champions	Runners-up	Score
2026	Not held		
2025	(Canada) Kayla Cross (United Kingdom) Amelia Rajecki	(Poland) Weronika Falkowska (Slovenia) Kristina Novak	6–4, 6–3
2024	(United States) Carmen Corley (Canada) Rebecca Marino	Alina Korneeva; Polina Kudermetova	6–3, 6–3
2023	Kamilla Rakhimova; Anastasia Tikhonova	(United States) Sabrina Santamaria (United Kingdom) Heather Watson	7–6^{(7–5)}, 6–2
2022	(Slovakia) Tereza Mihalíková (Indonesia) Aldila Sutjiadi	(United States) Ashlyn Krueger (United States) Elizabeth Mandlik	7–5, 6–2
⬆️ WTA 125 event ⬆️
2018–2021 not held
2017	(United States) Caroline Dolehide (Argentina) María Irigoyen (3)	(United States) Kaitlyn Christian (Mexico) Giuliana Olmos	6–4, 6–4
2016	(Romania) Mihaela Buzărnescu (Belgium) Elise Mertens	(United States) Usue Maitane Arconada (United Kingdom) Katie Swan	6–0, 6–2
2015	(Argentina) María Irigoyen (2) (Czech Republic) Barbora Krejčíková	(Paraguay) Verónica Cepede Royg (Russia) Marina Melnikova	7–5, 6–2
2014	(Croatia) Petra Martić (United States) Maria Sanchez	(Ukraine) Kateryna Bondarenko (Russia) Valeria Savinykh	3–6, 6–3, [10–2]
2013	(Bolivia) María Fernanda Álvarez Terán (Argentina) María Irigoyen	(Mexico) Constanza Gorches (Mexico) Victoria Rodríguez	6–3, 6–4
