= 2024 WTA Tour =

Women's tennis circuit

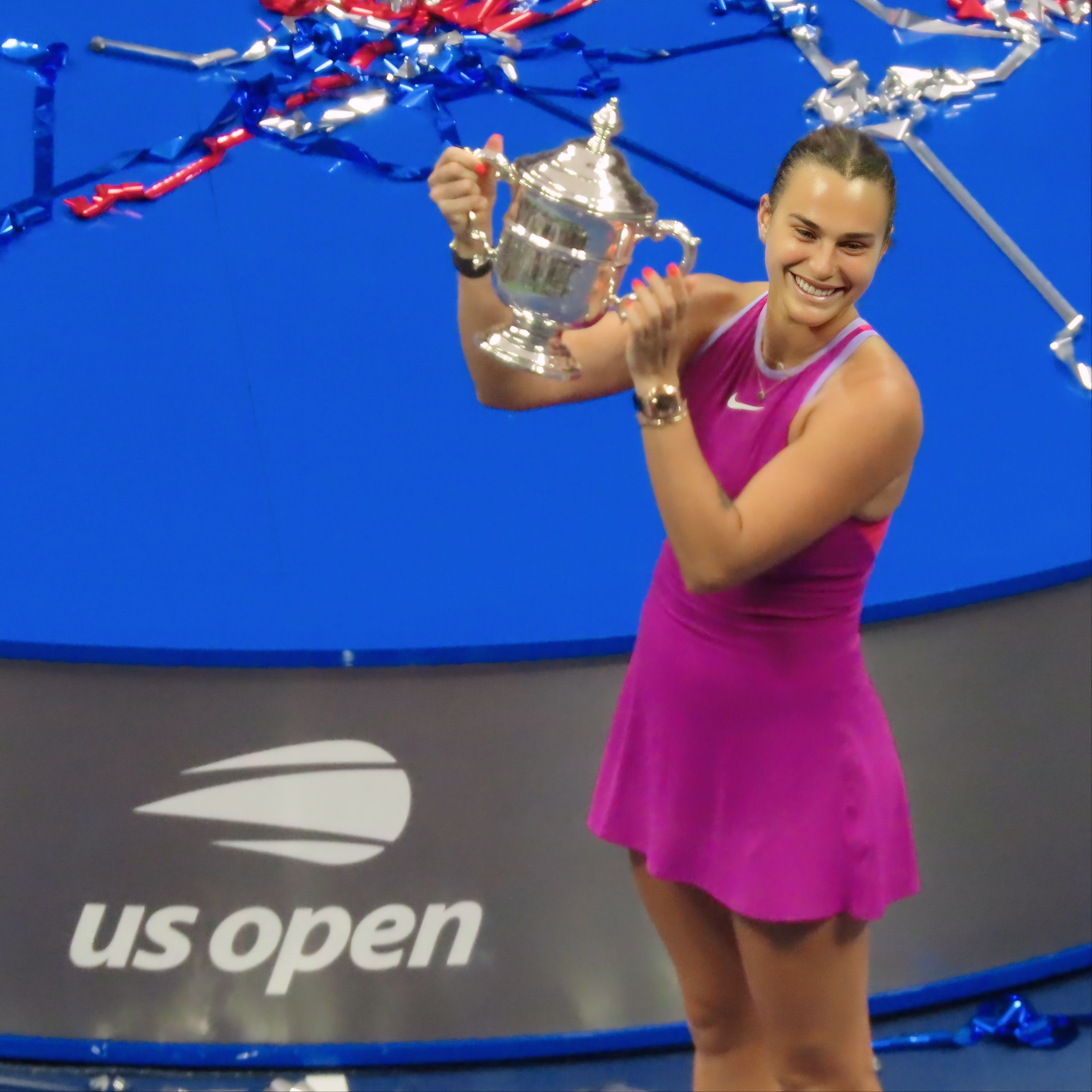
- Aryna Sabalenka finished the year as world No. 1 for the first time in her career. She won four tournaments during the season, including two majors at the Australian Open and US Open. She also won two WTA 1000 events.

Details
- Duration: 29 December 2023 – 16 November 2024
- Edition: 54th
- Tournaments: 58
- Categories: Grand Slam (4); Summer Olympics; WTA Finals; WTA 1000 (10); WTA 500 (17); WTA 250 (23); Billie Jean King Cup; United Cup

Achievements (singles)
- Most titles: (Poland) Iga Świątek (5)
- Most finals: Aryna Sabalenka (7)
- Prize money leader: Aryna Sabalenka ($9,729,260)
- Points leader: Aryna Sabalenka (9,416)

Awards
- Player of the year: Aryna Sabalenka
- Doubles team of the year: (Italy) Sara Errani (Italy) Jasmine Paolini
- Most improved player of the year: (United States) Emma Navarro
- Newcomer of the year: (New Zealand) Lulu Sun
- Comeback player of the year: (Spain) Paula Badosa

The 2024 WTA Tour (branded as the 2024 Hologic WTA Tour for sponsorship reasons) was the global elite women's professional tennis circuit organized by the Women's Tennis Association (WTA) for the 2024 tennis season. The 2024 WTA Tour calendar comprised the Grand Slam tournaments (supervised by the International Tennis Federation (ITF)), the WTA 1000 tournaments, the WTA 500 tournaments, the WTA 250 tournaments, the Billie Jean King Cup (organized by the ITF), the year-end championships (the WTA Finals), the team events United Cup (combined event with ATP) and the Summer Olympic Games.

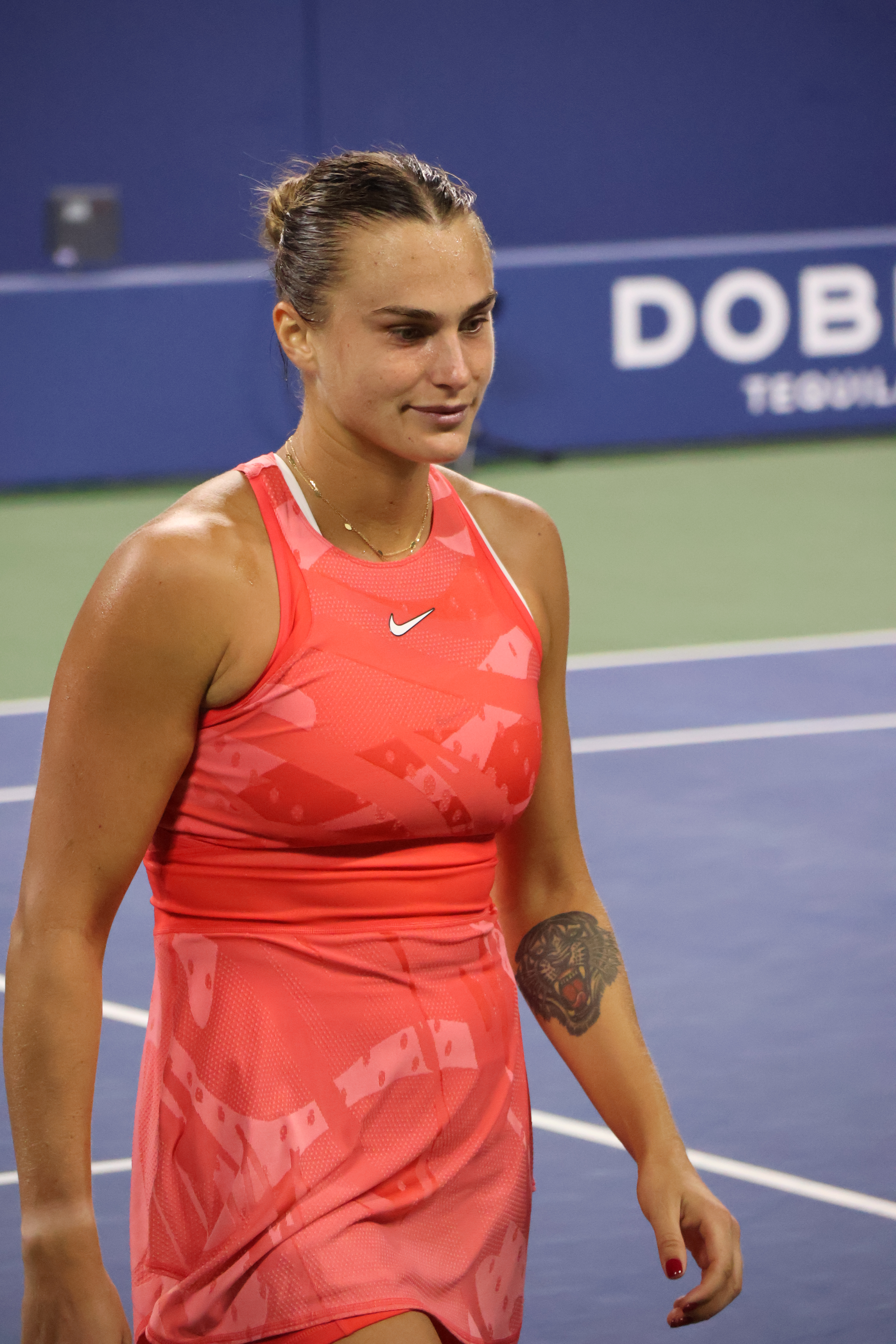
Sabalenka – 2024 Australian Open champion and 2024 US Open champion

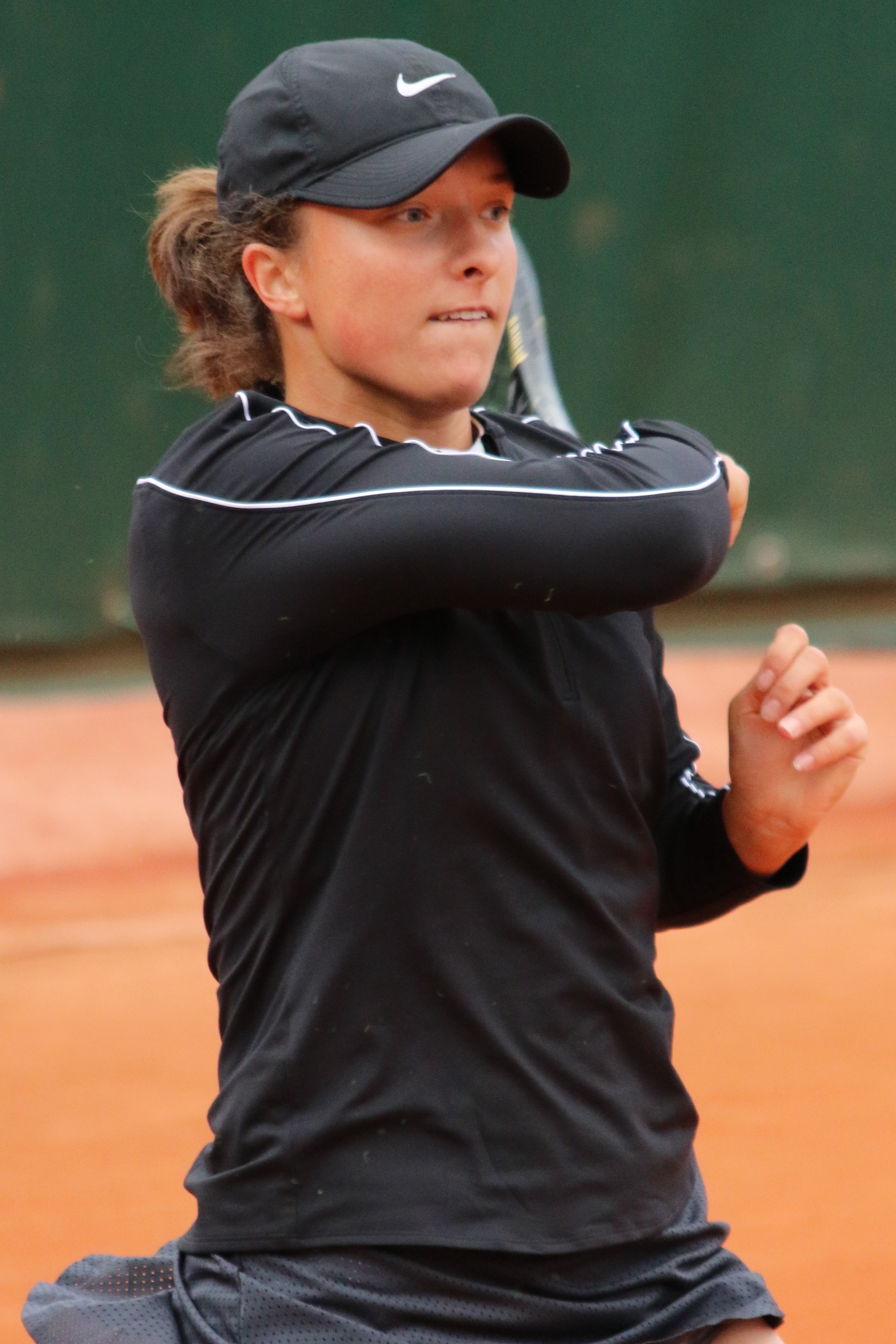
Iga Świątek – 2024 French Open champion

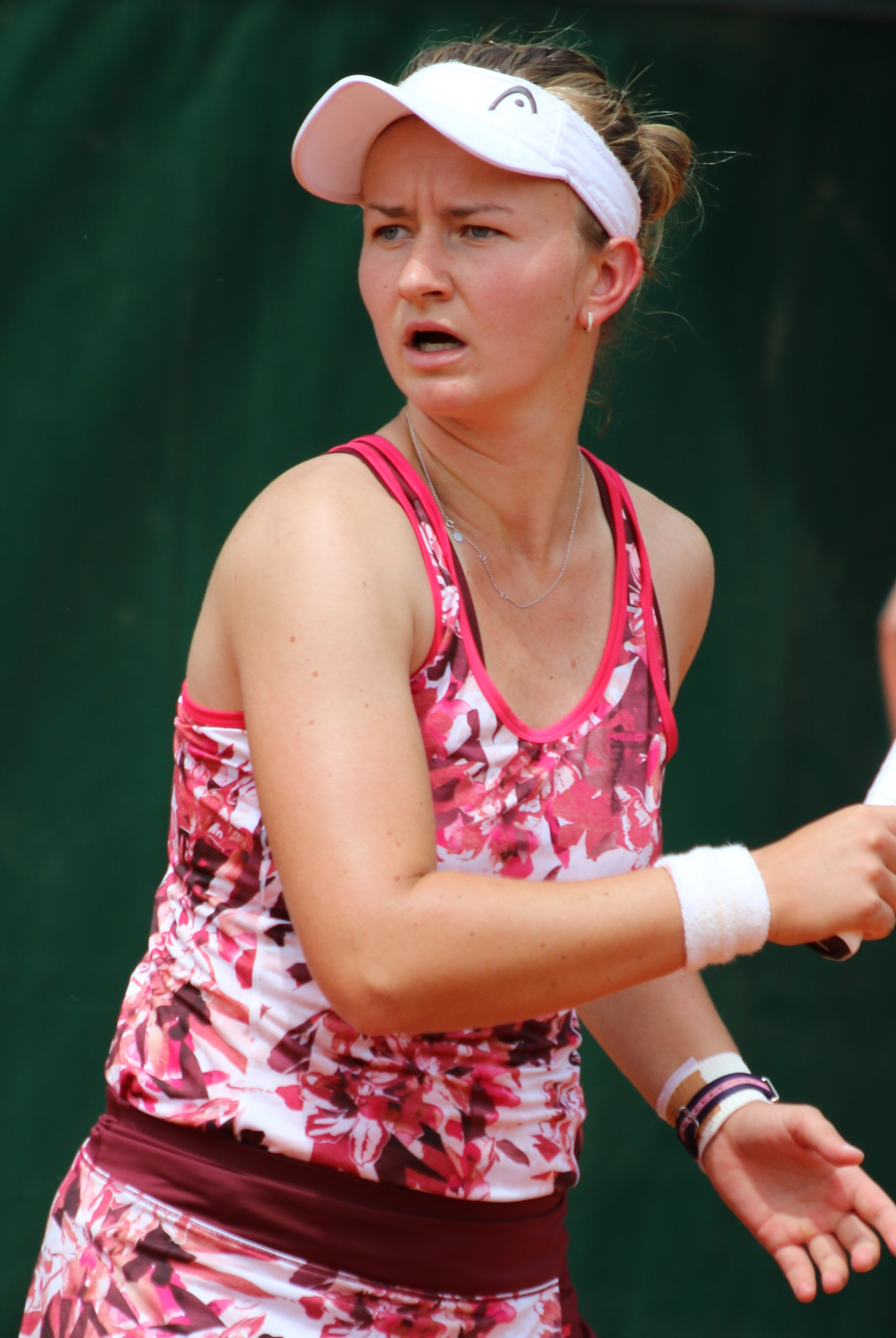
Barbora Krejčíková – 2024 Wimbledon champion

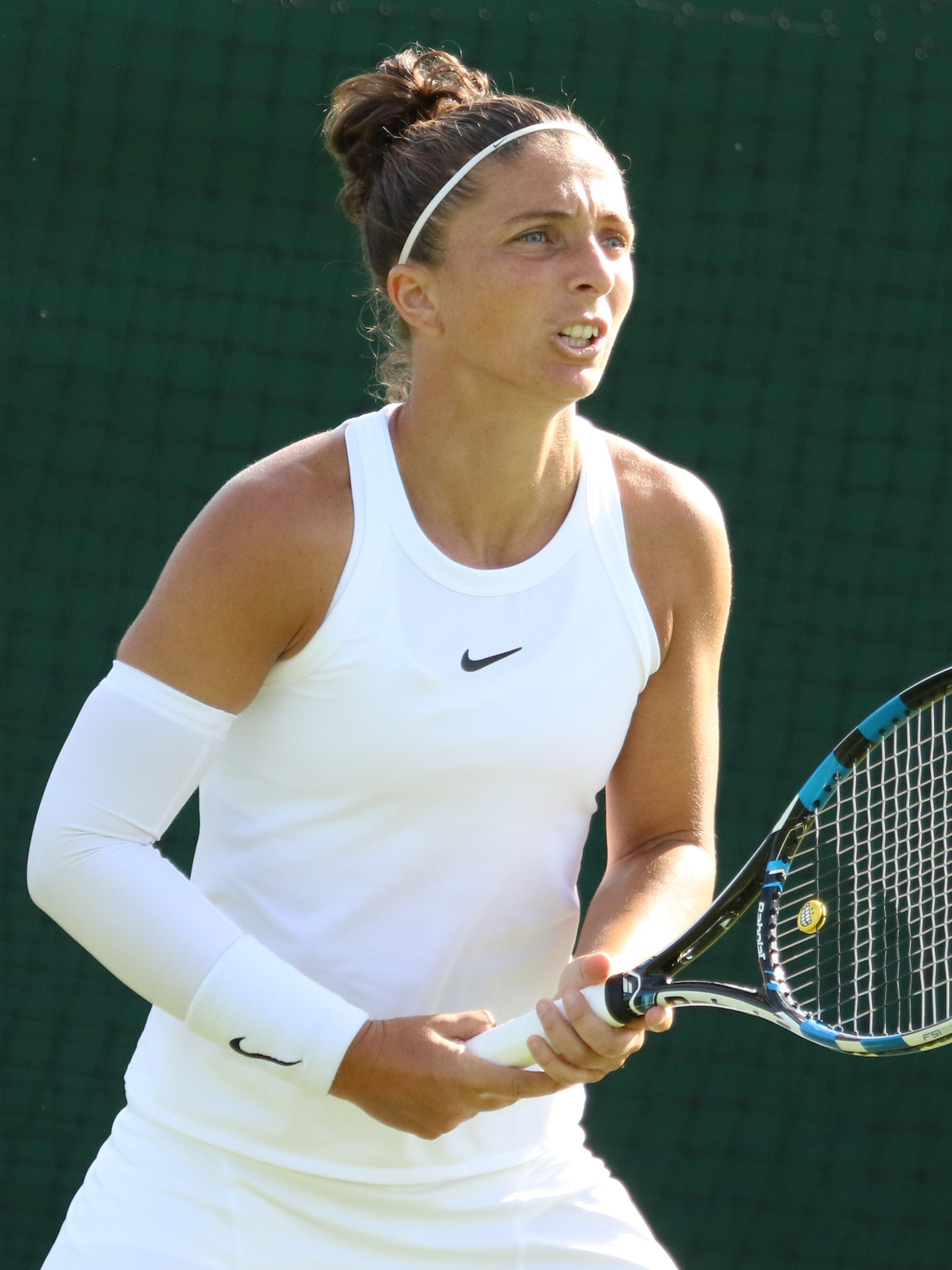
Sara Errani – Olympic women’s doubles gold (Paris 2024)

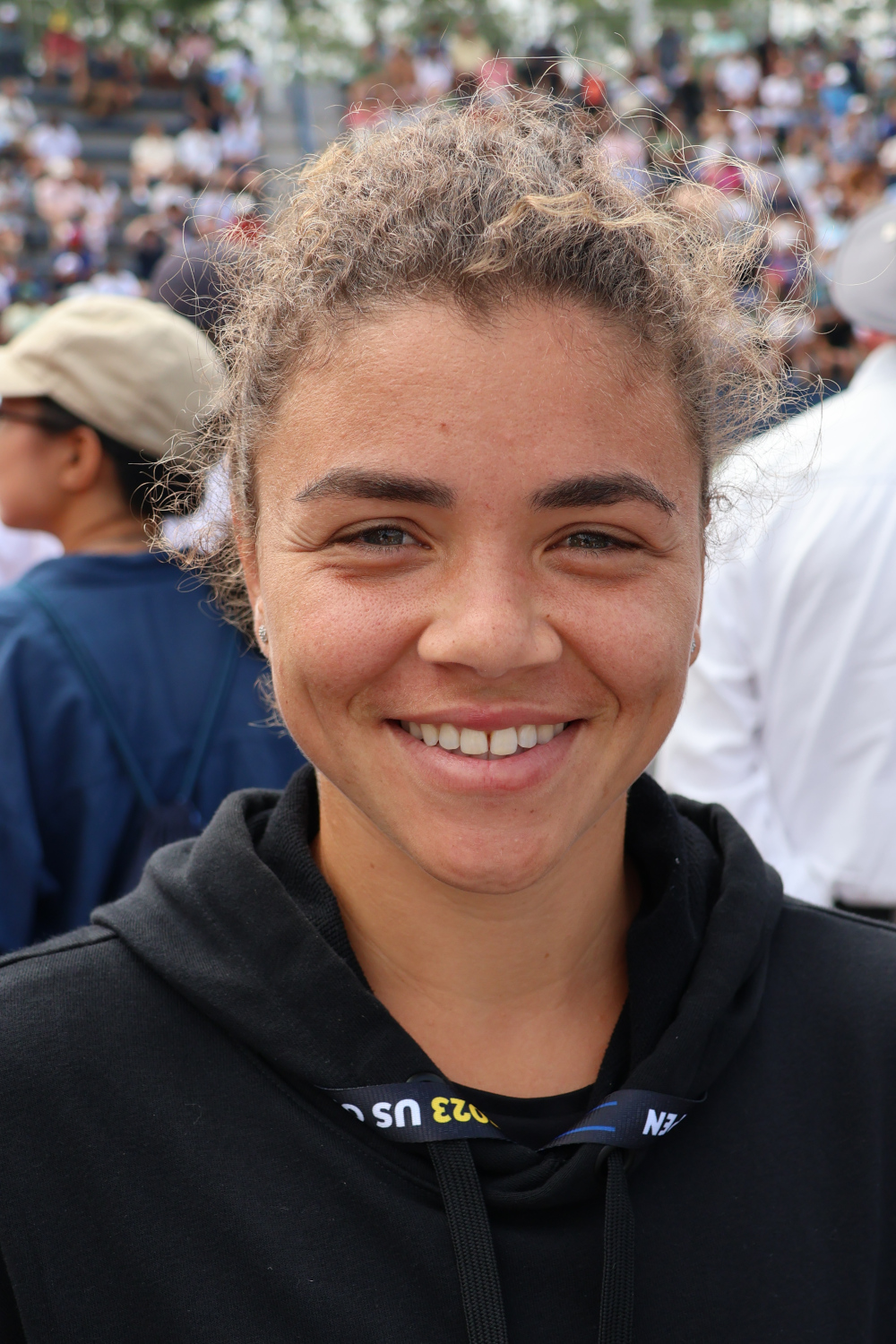
Jasmine Paolini – Olympic women’s doubles gold (Paris 2024)

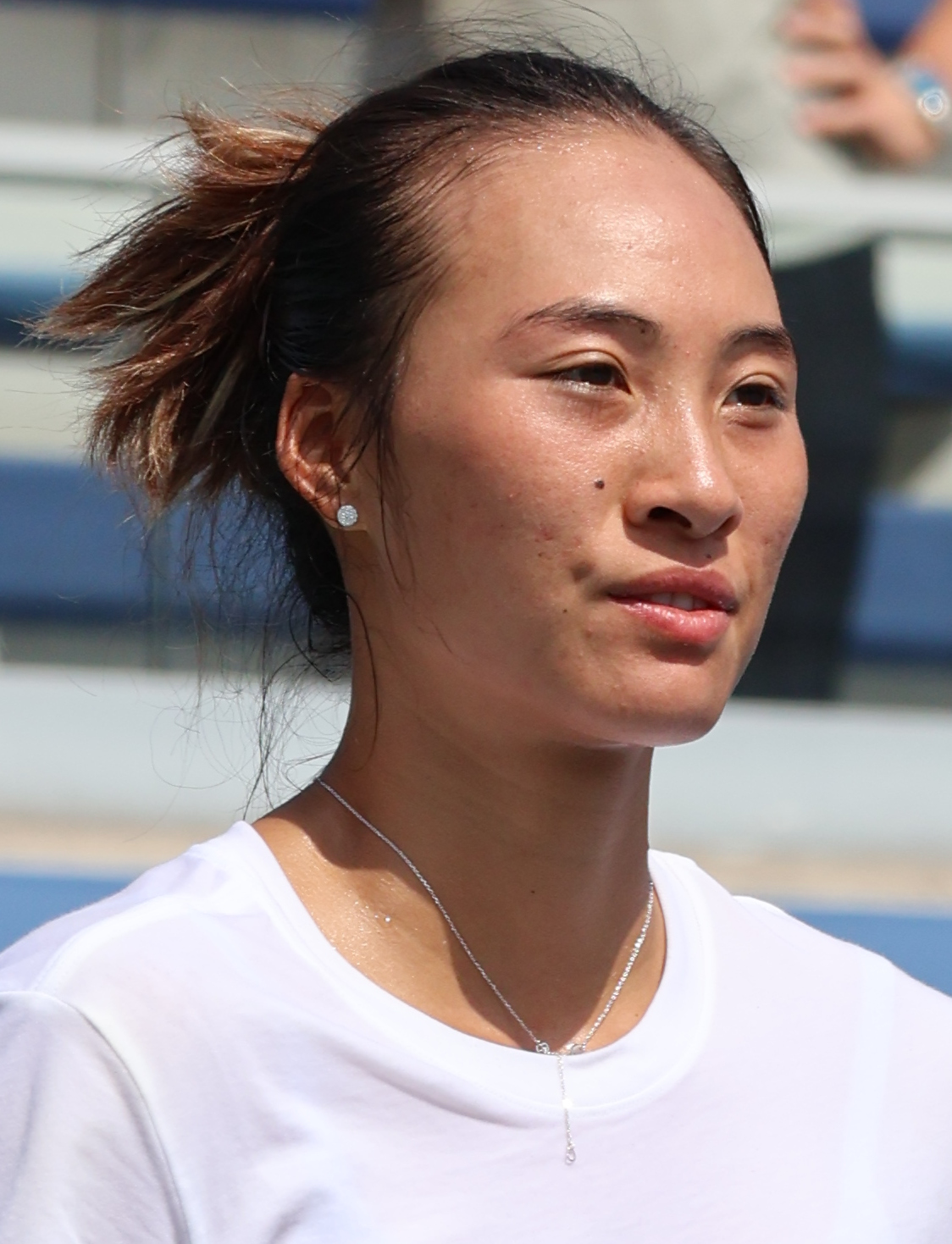
Zheng Qinwen – Olympic women’s singles gold (Paris 2024)

Aryna Sabalenka won the Australian Open, Iga Świątek won the French Open, Barbora Krejčíková took the Wimbledon title, and Sabalenka also won the US Open. At the Paris 2024 Olympics, Sara Errani and Jasmine Paolini won women's doubles gold, and Zheng Qinwen won women's singles gold.

== Schedule ==
This is the complete schedule of events on the 2024 calendar.

Key

Grand Slam tournaments
Summer Olympics
Year-end championships
WTA 1000
WTA 500
WTA 250
Team events

=== January ===
| Week | Tournament | Champions | Runners-up | Semifinalists | Quarterfinalists |
|---|---|---|---|---|---|
| Jan 1 | United Cup; Perth and Sydney, Australia; Hard – $5,000,000 – 18 teams Team events | Germany; 2–1 | Poland | France; Australia | China; Norway; Serbia; Greece |
| Jan 1 | Brisbane International; Brisbane, Australia; WTA 500; Hard – $1,736,763 – 48S/24Q/24D; Singles – Doubles | (Kazakhstan) Elena Rybakina; 6–0, 6–3 | Aryna Sabalenka | Victoria Azarenka (Czech Republic) Linda Nosková | Daria Kasatkina (Latvia) Jeļena Ostapenko; Mirra Andreeva; Anastasia Potapova |
| Jan 1 | Brisbane International; Brisbane, Australia; WTA 500; Hard – $1,736,763 – 48S/24Q/24D; Singles – Doubles | (Ukraine) Lyudmyla Kichenok (Latvia) Jeļena Ostapenko; 7–5, 6–2 | (Belgium) Greet Minnen (United Kingdom) Heather Watson | Victoria Azarenka (Czech Republic) Linda Nosková | Daria Kasatkina (Latvia) Jeļena Ostapenko; Mirra Andreeva; Anastasia Potapova |
| Jan 1 | Auckland Classic; Auckland, New Zealand; WTA 250; Hard – $267,082 – 32S/24Q/15D; Singles – Doubles | (United States) Coco Gauff; 6–7^{(4–7)}, 6–3, 6–3 | (Ukraine) Elina Svitolina | (United States) Emma Navarro (China) Wang Xiyu | (France) Varvara Gracheva (Croatia) Petra Martić (France) Diane Parry (Czech Republic) Marie Bouzková |
| Jan 1 | Auckland Classic; Auckland, New Zealand; WTA 250; Hard – $267,082 – 32S/24Q/15D; Singles – Doubles | (Kazakhstan) Anna Danilina (Slovakia) Viktória Hrunčáková; 6–3, 6–7^{(5–7)}, [10–8] | (Czech Republic) Marie Bouzková (United States) Bethanie Mattek-Sands | (United States) Emma Navarro (China) Wang Xiyu | (France) Varvara Gracheva (Croatia) Petra Martić (France) Diane Parry (Czech Republic) Marie Bouzková |
| Jan 8 | Adelaide International; Adelaide, Australia; WTA 500; Hard – $922,573 – 30S/24Q/16D; Singles – Doubles | (Latvia) Jeļena Ostapenko; 6–3, 6–2 | Daria Kasatkina | Ekaterina Alexandrova (United States) Jessica Pegula | (Kazakhstan) Elena Rybakina (Ukraine) Marta Kostyuk (Germany) Laura Siegemund; Anastasia Pavlyuchenkova |
| Jan 8 | Adelaide International; Adelaide, Australia; WTA 500; Hard – $922,573 – 30S/24Q/16D; Singles – Doubles | (Brazil) Beatriz Haddad Maia (United States) Taylor Townsend; 7–5, 6–3 | (France) Caroline Garcia (France) Kristina Mladenovic | Ekaterina Alexandrova (United States) Jessica Pegula | (Kazakhstan) Elena Rybakina (Ukraine) Marta Kostyuk (Germany) Laura Siegemund; Anastasia Pavlyuchenkova |
| Jan 8 | Hobart International; Hobart, Australia; WTA 250; Hard – $267,082 – 32S/24Q/16D; Singles – Doubles | (United States) Emma Navarro; 6–1, 4–6, 7–5 | (Belgium) Elise Mertens | (Australia) Daria Saville (China) Yuan Yue | (Netherlands) Arantxa Rus (China) Zhu Lin (Kazakhstan) Yulia Putintseva (Bulgaria) Viktoriya Tomova |
| Jan 8 | Hobart International; Hobart, Australia; WTA 250; Hard – $267,082 – 32S/24Q/16D; Singles – Doubles | (Chinese Taipei) Chan Hao-ching (Mexico) Giuliana Olmos; 6–3, 6–3 | (China) Guo Hanyu (China) Jiang Xinyu | (Australia) Daria Saville (China) Yuan Yue | (Netherlands) Arantxa Rus (China) Zhu Lin (Kazakhstan) Yulia Putintseva (Bulgaria) Viktoriya Tomova |
| Jan 15; Jan 22 | Australian Open; Melbourne, Australia; Grand Slam; Hard – $39,264,000 – 128S/64D/32X; Singles – Doubles – Mixed | Aryna Sabalenka; 6–3, 6–2 | (China) Zheng Qinwen | (Ukraine) Dayana Yastremska (United States) Coco Gauff | (Czech Republic) Linda Nosková; Anna Kalinskaya (Ukraine) Marta Kostyuk (Czech Republic) Barbora Krejčíková |
| Jan 15; Jan 22 | Australian Open; Melbourne, Australia; Grand Slam; Hard – $39,264,000 – 128S/64D/32X; Singles – Doubles – Mixed | (Chinese Taipei) Hsieh Su-wei (Belgium) Elise Mertens; 6–1, 7–5 | (Ukraine) Lyudmyla Kichenok (Latvia) Jeļena Ostapenko | (Ukraine) Dayana Yastremska (United States) Coco Gauff | (Czech Republic) Linda Nosková; Anna Kalinskaya (Ukraine) Marta Kostyuk (Czech Republic) Barbora Krejčíková |
| Jan 15; Jan 22 | Australian Open; Melbourne, Australia; Grand Slam; Hard – $39,264,000 – 128S/64D/32X; Singles – Doubles – Mixed | (Chinese Taipei) Hsieh Su-wei (Poland) Jan Zieliński; 6–7^{(5–7)}, 6–4, [11–9] | (United States) Desirae Krawczyk (United Kingdom) Neal Skupski | (Ukraine) Dayana Yastremska (United States) Coco Gauff | (Czech Republic) Linda Nosková; Anna Kalinskaya (Ukraine) Marta Kostyuk (Czech Republic) Barbora Krejčíková |
| Jan 29 | Linz Open; Linz, Austria; WTA 500; Hard (i) – $922,573 – 28S/24Q/16D; Singles – Doubles | (Latvia) Jeļena Ostapenko; 6–2, 6–3 | Ekaterina Alexandrova | Anastasia Pavlyuchenkova (Croatia) Donna Vekić | (United Kingdom) Jodie Burrage (Belgium) Elise Mertens (France) Clara Burel; Anastasia Potapova |
| Jan 29 | Linz Open; Linz, Austria; WTA 500; Hard (i) – $922,573 – 28S/24Q/16D; Singles – Doubles | (Italy) Sara Errani (Italy) Jasmine Paolini; 7–5, 4–6, [10–7] | (United States) Nicole Melichar-Martinez (Australia) Ellen Perez | Anastasia Pavlyuchenkova (Croatia) Donna Vekić | (United Kingdom) Jodie Burrage (Belgium) Elise Mertens (France) Clara Burel; Anastasia Potapova |
| Jan 29 | Thailand Open; Hua Hin, Thailand; WTA 250; Hard – $267,082 – 32S/24Q/16D; Singles – Doubles | Diana Shnaider; 6–3, 2–6, 6–1 | (China) Zhu Lin | (China) Wang Xinyu (China) Wang Yafan | (Hungary) Dalma Gálfi (Kazakhstan) Yulia Putintseva (United States) Katie Volynets (Australia) Arina Rodionova |
| Jan 29 | Thailand Open; Hua Hin, Thailand; WTA 250; Hard – $267,082 – 32S/24Q/16D; Singles – Doubles | (Japan) Miyu Kato (Indonesia) Aldila Sutjiadi; 6–4, 1–6, [10–7] | (China) Guo Hanyu (China) Jiang Xinyu | (China) Wang Xinyu (China) Wang Yafan | (Hungary) Dalma Gálfi (Kazakhstan) Yulia Putintseva (United States) Katie Volynets (Australia) Arina Rodionova |

=== February ===
| Week | Tournament | Champions | Runners-up | Semifinalists | Quarterfinalists |
|---|---|---|---|---|---|
| Feb 5 | Abu Dhabi Open; Abu Dhabi, UAE; WTA 500; Hard – $922,573 – 28S/24Q/16D; Singles – Doubles | (Kazakhstan) Elena Rybakina; 6–1, 6–4 | Daria Kasatkina | Liudmila Samsonova (Brazil) Beatriz Haddad Maia | (Spain) Cristina Bucșa (Czech Republic) Barbora Krejčíková (Romania) Sorana Cîrstea (Tunisia) Ons Jabeur |
| Feb 5 | Abu Dhabi Open; Abu Dhabi, UAE; WTA 500; Hard – $922,573 – 28S/24Q/16D; Singles – Doubles | (United States) Sofia Kenin (United States) Bethanie Mattek-Sands; 6–4, 7–6^{(7–4)} | (Czech Republic) Linda Nosková (United Kingdom) Heather Watson | Liudmila Samsonova (Brazil) Beatriz Haddad Maia | (Spain) Cristina Bucșa (Czech Republic) Barbora Krejčíková (Romania) Sorana Cîrstea (Tunisia) Ons Jabeur |
| Feb 5 | Transylvania Open; Cluj-Napoca, Romania; WTA 250; Hard (i) – $267,082 – 32S/24Q/16D; Singles – Doubles | (Czech Republic) Karolína Plíšková; 6–4, 6–3 | (Romania) Ana Bogdan | (Romania) Jaqueline Cristian (United Kingdom) Harriet Dart | (Netherlands) Arantxa Rus (Latvia) Anastasija Sevastova (Spain) Nuria Párrizas Díaz (Italy) Sara Errani |
| Feb 5 | Transylvania Open; Cluj-Napoca, Romania; WTA 250; Hard (i) – $267,082 – 32S/24Q/16D; Singles – Doubles | (United States) Caty McNally (United States) Asia Muhammad; 6–3, 6–4 | (United Kingdom) Harriet Dart (Slovakia) Tereza Mihalíková | (Romania) Jaqueline Cristian (United Kingdom) Harriet Dart | (Netherlands) Arantxa Rus (Latvia) Anastasija Sevastova (Spain) Nuria Párrizas Díaz (Italy) Sara Errani |
| Feb 12 | Qatar Open; Doha, Qatar; WTA 1000; Hard – $3,211,715 – 56S/32Q/16D; Singles – Doubles | (Poland) Iga Świątek; 7–6^{(10–8)}, 6–2 | (Kazakhstan) Elena Rybakina | (Czech Republic) Karolína Plíšková; Anastasia Pavlyuchenkova | Victoria Azarenka (Japan) Naomi Osaka (Canada) Leylah Fernandez (United States) Danielle Collins |
| Feb 12 | Qatar Open; Doha, Qatar; WTA 1000; Hard – $3,211,715 – 56S/32Q/16D; Singles – Doubles | (Netherlands) Demi Schuurs (Brazil) Luisa Stefani; 6–4, 6–2 | (United States) Caroline Dolehide (United States) Desirae Krawczyk | (Czech Republic) Karolína Plíšková; Anastasia Pavlyuchenkova | Victoria Azarenka (Japan) Naomi Osaka (Canada) Leylah Fernandez (United States) Danielle Collins |
| Feb 19 | Dubai Tennis Championships; Dubai, UAE; WTA 1000; Hard – $3,211,715 – 56S/32Q/16D; Singles – Doubles | (Italy) Jasmine Paolini; 4–6, 7–5, 7–5 | Anna Kalinskaya | (Poland) Iga Świątek (Romania) Sorana Cîrstea | (China) Zheng Qinwen (United States) Coco Gauff (Kazakhstan) Elena Rybakina (Czech Republic) Markéta Vondroušová |
| Feb 19 | Dubai Tennis Championships; Dubai, UAE; WTA 1000; Hard – $3,211,715 – 56S/32Q/16D; Singles – Doubles | (Australia) Storm Hunter (Czech Republic) Kateřina Siniaková; 6–4, 6–2 | (United States) Nicole Melichar-Martinez (Australia) Ellen Perez | (Poland) Iga Świątek (Romania) Sorana Cîrstea | (China) Zheng Qinwen (United States) Coco Gauff (Kazakhstan) Elena Rybakina (Czech Republic) Markéta Vondroušová |
| Feb 26 | San Diego Open; San Diego, United States; WTA 500; Hard – $922,573 – 28S/24Q/16D; Singles – Doubles | (United Kingdom) Katie Boulter; 5–7, 6–2, 6–2 | (Ukraine) Marta Kostyuk | (United States) Jessica Pegula (United States) Emma Navarro | Anna Blinkova; Anastasia Pavlyuchenkova (Australia) Daria Saville (Croatia) Donna Vekić |
| Feb 26 | San Diego Open; San Diego, United States; WTA 500; Hard – $922,573 – 28S/24Q/16D; Singles – Doubles | (United States) Nicole Melichar-Martinez (Australia) Ellen Perez; 6–1, 6–2 | (United States) Desirae Krawczyk (United States) Jessica Pegula | (United States) Jessica Pegula (United States) Emma Navarro | Anna Blinkova; Anastasia Pavlyuchenkova (Australia) Daria Saville (Croatia) Donna Vekić |
| Feb 26 | ATX Open; Austin, United States; WTA 250; Hard – $267,082 – 32S/24Q/16D; Singles – Doubles | (China) Yuan Yue; 6–4, 7–6^{(7–4)} | (China) Wang Xiyu | (Ukraine) Anhelina Kalinina (Slovakia) Anna Karolína Schmiedlová | (France) Diane Parry (United States) Danielle Collins (China) Wang Yafan (Latvia) Anastasija Sevastova |
| Feb 26 | ATX Open; Austin, United States; WTA 250; Hard – $267,082 – 32S/24Q/16D; Singles – Doubles | (Australia) Olivia Gadecki (United Kingdom) Olivia Nicholls; 6–2, 6–4 | (Poland) Katarzyna Kawa (Netherlands) Bibiane Schoofs | (Ukraine) Anhelina Kalinina (Slovakia) Anna Karolína Schmiedlová | (France) Diane Parry (United States) Danielle Collins (China) Wang Yafan (Latvia) Anastasija Sevastova |

=== March ===
| Week | Tournament | Champions | Runners-up | Semifinalists | Quarterfinalists |
|---|---|---|---|---|---|
| Mar 4 Mar 11 | Indian Wells Open; Indian Wells, United States; WTA 1000; Hard – $9,258,080 – 96S/48Q/32D; Singles – Doubles – Mixed | (Poland) Iga Świątek; 6–4, 6–0 | (Greece) Maria Sakkari | (Ukraine) Marta Kostyuk (United States) Coco Gauff | (Denmark) Caroline Wozniacki; Anastasia Potapova (China) Yuan Yue (United States) Emma Navarro |
| Mar 4 Mar 11 | Indian Wells Open; Indian Wells, United States; WTA 1000; Hard – $9,258,080 – 96S/48Q/32D; Singles – Doubles – Mixed | (Chinese Taipei) Hsieh Su-wei (Belgium) Elise Mertens; 6–3, 6–4 | (Australia) Storm Hunter (Czech Republic) Kateřina Siniaková | (Ukraine) Marta Kostyuk (United States) Coco Gauff | (Denmark) Caroline Wozniacki; Anastasia Potapova (China) Yuan Yue (United States) Emma Navarro |
| Mar 4 Mar 11 | Indian Wells Open; Indian Wells, United States; WTA 1000; Hard – $9,258,080 – 96S/48Q/32D; Singles – Doubles – Mixed | (Australia) Storm Hunter (Australia) Matthew Ebden; 6–3, 6–3 | (France) Caroline Garcia (France) Édouard Roger-Vasselin | (Ukraine) Marta Kostyuk (United States) Coco Gauff | (Denmark) Caroline Wozniacki; Anastasia Potapova (China) Yuan Yue (United States) Emma Navarro |
| Mar 18; Mar 25 | Miami Open; Miami Gardens, United States; WTA 1000; Hard – $8,770,480 – 96S/48Q/32D; Singles – Doubles | (United States) Danielle Collins; 7–5, 6–3 | (Kazakhstan) Elena Rybakina | Ekaterina Alexandrova; Victoria Azarenka | (United States) Jessica Pegula (France) Caroline Garcia (Greece) Maria Sakkari (Kazakhstan) Yulia Putintseva |
| Mar 18; Mar 25 | Miami Open; Miami Gardens, United States; WTA 1000; Hard – $8,770,480 – 96S/48Q/32D; Singles – Doubles | (United States) Sofia Kenin (United States) Bethanie Mattek-Sands; 4–6, 7–6^{(7–5)}, [11–9] | (Canada) Gabriela Dabrowski (New Zealand) Erin Routliffe | Ekaterina Alexandrova; Victoria Azarenka | (United States) Jessica Pegula (France) Caroline Garcia (Greece) Maria Sakkari (Kazakhstan) Yulia Putintseva |

=== April ===
| Week | Tournament | Champions | Runners-up | Semifinalists | Quarterfinalists |
|---|---|---|---|---|---|
| Apr 1 | Charleston Open; Charleston, United States; WTA 500; Clay (green) – $922,573 – 48S/24Q/16D; Singles – Doubles | (United States) Danielle Collins; 6–2, 6–1 | Daria Kasatkina | (United States) Jessica Pegula (Greece) Maria Sakkari | Victoria Azarenka (Romania) Jaqueline Cristian; Veronika Kudermetova (Belgium) Elise Mertens |
| Apr 1 | Charleston Open; Charleston, United States; WTA 500; Clay (green) – $922,573 – 48S/24Q/16D; Singles – Doubles | (United States) Ashlyn Krueger (United States) Sloane Stephens; 1–6, 6–3, [10–7] | (Ukraine) Lyudmyla Kichenok (Ukraine) Nadiia Kichenok | (United States) Jessica Pegula (Greece) Maria Sakkari | Victoria Azarenka (Romania) Jaqueline Cristian; Veronika Kudermetova (Belgium) Elise Mertens |
| Apr 1 | Copa Colsanitas; Bogotá, Colombia; WTA 250; Clay – $267,082 – 32S/24Q/16D; Singles – Doubles | (Colombia) Camila Osorio; 6–3, 7–6^{(7–5)} | (Czech Republic) Marie Bouzková | Kamilla Rakhimova (Italy) Sara Errani | (Germany) Laura Siegemund (Spain) Cristina Bucșa (Romania) Irina Bara (Germany) Tatjana Maria |
| Apr 1 | Copa Colsanitas; Bogotá, Colombia; WTA 250; Clay – $267,082 – 32S/24Q/16D; Singles – Doubles | (Spain) Cristina Bucșa; Kamilla Rakhimova; 7–6^{(7–5)}, 3–6, [10–8] | (Hungary) Anna Bondár; Irina Khromacheva | Kamilla Rakhimova (Italy) Sara Errani | (Germany) Laura Siegemund (Spain) Cristina Bucșa (Romania) Irina Bara (Germany) Tatjana Maria |
| Apr 8 | Billie Jean King Cup qualifying round | Qualifying-round winners Australia, 4–0; Poland, 4–0; Great Britain, 3–1; United States, 4–0; Japan, 3–1; Germany, 3–1; Slovakia, 4–0; Romania, 3–2 | Qualifying-round losers Mexico; Switzerland; France; Belgium; Kazakhstan; Brazil; Slovenia; Ukraine | | |
| Apr 15 | Stuttgart Open; Stuttgart, Germany; WTA 500; Clay (i) – $922,573 – 28S/16Q/16D; Singles – Doubles | (Kazakhstan) Elena Rybakina; 6–2, 6–2 | (Ukraine) Marta Kostyuk | (Poland) Iga Świątek (Czech Republic) Markéta Vondroušová | (United Kingdom) Emma Raducanu (Italy) Jasmine Paolini (United States) Coco Gauff; Aryna Sabalenka |
| Apr 15 | Stuttgart Open; Stuttgart, Germany; WTA 500; Clay (i) – $922,573 – 28S/16Q/16D; Singles – Doubles | (Chinese Taipei) Chan Hao-ching; Veronika Kudermetova; 4–6, 6–3, [10–2] | (Norway) Ulrikke Eikeri (Estonia) Ingrid Neel | (Poland) Iga Świątek (Czech Republic) Markéta Vondroušová | (United Kingdom) Emma Raducanu (Italy) Jasmine Paolini (United States) Coco Gauff; Aryna Sabalenka |
| Apr 15 | Open de Rouen; Rouen, France; WTA 250; Clay (i) – $267,082 – 32S/16Q/16D; Singles – Doubles | (United States) Sloane Stephens; 6–1, 2–6, 6–2 | (Poland) Magda Linette | (Ukraine) Anhelina Kalinina (France) Caroline Garcia | (Netherlands) Arantxa Rus; Mirra Andreeva (China) Yuan Yue (Romania) Elena-Gabriela Ruse |
| Apr 15 | Open de Rouen; Rouen, France; WTA 250; Clay (i) – $267,082 – 32S/16Q/16D; Singles – Doubles | (Hungary) Tímea Babos; Irina Khromacheva; 6–3, 6–4 | (United Kingdom) Naiktha Bains (United Kingdom) Maia Lumsden | (Ukraine) Anhelina Kalinina (France) Caroline Garcia | (Netherlands) Arantxa Rus; Mirra Andreeva (China) Yuan Yue (Romania) Elena-Gabriela Ruse |
| Apr 22; Apr 29 | Madrid Open; Madrid, Spain; WTA 1000; Clay – $8,770,480 – 96S/48Q/32D; Singles – Doubles | (Poland) Iga Świątek; 7–5, 4–6, 7–6^{(9–7)} | Aryna Sabalenka | (United States) Madison Keys (Kazakhstan) Elena Rybakina | (Brazil) Beatriz Haddad Maia (Tunisia) Ons Jabeur (Kazakhstan) Yulia Putintseva; Mirra Andreeva |
| Apr 22; Apr 29 | Madrid Open; Madrid, Spain; WTA 1000; Clay – $8,770,480 – 96S/48Q/32D; Singles – Doubles | (Spain) Cristina Bucșa (Spain) Sara Sorribes Tormo; 6–0, 6–2 | (Czech Republic) Barbora Krejčíková (Germany) Laura Siegemund | (United States) Madison Keys (Kazakhstan) Elena Rybakina | (Brazil) Beatriz Haddad Maia (Tunisia) Ons Jabeur (Kazakhstan) Yulia Putintseva; Mirra Andreeva |

=== May ===
| Week | Tournament | Champions | Runners-up | Semifinalists | Quarterfinalists |
|---|---|---|---|---|---|
| May 6 May 13 | Italian Open; Rome, Italy; WTA 1000; Clay – $5,509,771 – 96S/48Q/32D; Singles – Doubles | (Poland) Iga Świątek; 6–2, 6–3 | Aryna Sabalenka | (United States) Coco Gauff (United States) Danielle Collins | (United States) Madison Keys (China) Zheng Qinwen; Victoria Azarenka (Latvia) Jeļena Ostapenko |
| May 6 May 13 | Italian Open; Rome, Italy; WTA 1000; Clay – $5,509,771 – 96S/48Q/32D; Singles – Doubles | (Italy) Sara Errani (Italy) Jasmine Paolini; 6–3, 4–6, [10–8] | (United States) Coco Gauff (New Zealand) Erin Routliffe | (United States) Coco Gauff (United States) Danielle Collins | (United States) Madison Keys (China) Zheng Qinwen; Victoria Azarenka (Latvia) Jeļena Ostapenko |
| May 20 | Internationaux de Strasbourg; Strasbourg, France; WTA 500; Clay – $922,573 – 28S/16Q/16D; Singles – Doubles | (United States) Madison Keys; 6–1, 6–2 | (United States) Danielle Collins | (Ukraine) Anhelina Kalinina; Liudmila Samsonova | (Czech Republic) Markéta Vondroušová (France) Clara Burel (Poland) Magda Linette (Brazil) Beatriz Haddad Maia |
| May 20 | Internationaux de Strasbourg; Strasbourg, France; WTA 500; Clay – $922,573 – 28S/16Q/16D; Singles – Doubles | (Spain) Cristina Bucșa (Romania) Monica Niculescu; 3–6, 6–4, [10–6] | (United States) Asia Muhammad (Indonesia) Aldila Sutjiadi | (Ukraine) Anhelina Kalinina; Liudmila Samsonova | (Czech Republic) Markéta Vondroušová (France) Clara Burel (Poland) Magda Linette (Brazil) Beatriz Haddad Maia |
| May 20 | Morocco Open; Rabat, Morocco; WTA 250; Clay – $267,082 – 32S/16Q/16D; Singles – Doubles | (United States) Peyton Stearns; 6–2, 6–1 | (Egypt) Mayar Sherif | Kamilla Rakhimova (Bulgaria) Viktoriya Tomova | (Italy) Elisabetta Cocciaretto (Spain) Sara Sorribes Tormo (Italy) Lucia Bronzetti (Germany) Laura Siegemund |
| May 20 | Morocco Open; Rabat, Morocco; WTA 250; Clay – $267,082 – 32S/16Q/16D; Singles – Doubles | Irina Khromacheva; Yana Sizikova; 6–3, 6–2 | (Kazakhstan) Anna Danilina (China) Xu Yifan | Kamilla Rakhimova (Bulgaria) Viktoriya Tomova | (Italy) Elisabetta Cocciaretto (Spain) Sara Sorribes Tormo (Italy) Lucia Bronzetti (Germany) Laura Siegemund |
| May 27; Jun 3 | French Open; Paris, France; Grand Slam; Clay – €24,961,000 – 128S/64D/32X; Singles – Doubles – Mixed | (Poland) Iga Świątek; 6–2, 6–1 | (Italy) Jasmine Paolini | (United States) Coco Gauff; Mirra Andreeva | (Czech Republic) Markéta Vondroušová (Tunisia) Ons Jabeur (Kazakhstan) Elena Rybakina; Aryna Sabalenka |
| May 27; Jun 3 | French Open; Paris, France; Grand Slam; Clay – €24,961,000 – 128S/64D/32X; Singles – Doubles – Mixed | (United States) Coco Gauff (Czech Republic) Kateřina Siniaková; 7–6^{(7–5)}, 6–3 | (Italy) Sara Errani (Italy) Jasmine Paolini | (United States) Coco Gauff; Mirra Andreeva | (Czech Republic) Markéta Vondroušová (Tunisia) Ons Jabeur (Kazakhstan) Elena Rybakina; Aryna Sabalenka |
| May 27; Jun 3 | French Open; Paris, France; Grand Slam; Clay – €24,961,000 – 128S/64D/32X; Singles – Doubles – Mixed | (Germany) Laura Siegemund (France) Édouard Roger-Vasselin; 6–4, 7–5 | (United States) Desirae Krawczyk (United Kingdom) Neal Skupski | (United States) Coco Gauff; Mirra Andreeva | (Czech Republic) Markéta Vondroušová (Tunisia) Ons Jabeur (Kazakhstan) Elena Rybakina; Aryna Sabalenka |

=== June ===
| Week | Tournament | Champions | Runners-up | Semifinalists | Quarterfinalists |
|---|---|---|---|---|---|
| Jun 10 | Libéma Open; Rosmalen, Netherlands; WTA 250; Grass – $267,082 – 32S/24Q/16D; Singles – Doubles | Liudmila Samsonova; 4–6, 6–3, 7–5 | (Canada) Bianca Andreescu | (Hungary) Dalma Gálfi; Ekaterina Alexandrova | (Serbia) Aleksandra Krunić (Japan) Naomi Osaka (United States) Robin Montgomery (Belgium) Greet Minnen |
| Jun 10 | Libéma Open; Rosmalen, Netherlands; WTA 250; Grass – $267,082 – 32S/24Q/16D; Singles – Doubles | (Estonia) Ingrid Neel (Netherlands) Bibiane Schoofs; 7–6^{(8–6)}, 6–3 | (Slovakia) Tereza Mihalíková (United Kingdom) Olivia Nicholls | (Hungary) Dalma Gálfi; Ekaterina Alexandrova | (Serbia) Aleksandra Krunić (Japan) Naomi Osaka (United States) Robin Montgomery (Belgium) Greet Minnen |
| Jun 10 | Nottingham Open; Nottingham, United Kingdom; WTA 250; Grass – $267,082 – 32S/24Q/16D; Singles – Doubles | (United Kingdom) Katie Boulter; 4–6, 6–3, 6–2 | (Czech Republic) Karolína Plíšková | (France) Diane Parry (United Kingdom) Emma Raducanu | (Tunisia) Ons Jabeur (Australia) Kimberly Birrell (Poland) Magdalena Fręch (United Kingdom) Francesca Jones |
| Jun 10 | Nottingham Open; Nottingham, United Kingdom; WTA 250; Grass – $267,082 – 32S/24Q/16D; Singles – Doubles | (Canada) Gabriela Dabrowski (New Zealand) Erin Routliffe; 5–7, 6–3, [11–9] | (United Kingdom) Harriet Dart (France) Diane Parry | (France) Diane Parry (United Kingdom) Emma Raducanu | (Tunisia) Ons Jabeur (Australia) Kimberly Birrell (Poland) Magdalena Fręch (United Kingdom) Francesca Jones |
| Jun 17 | Berlin Ladies Open; Berlin, Germany; WTA 500; Grass – €802,237 – 28S/24Q/16D; Singles – Doubles | (United States) Jessica Pegula; 6–7^{(0–7)}, 6–4, 7–6^{(7–3)} | Anna Kalinskaya | (United States) Coco Gauff; Victoria Azarenka | (Tunisia) Ons Jabeur (Czech Republic) Kateřina Siniaková (Kazakhstan) Elena Rybakina; Aryna Sabalenka |
| Jun 17 | Berlin Ladies Open; Berlin, Germany; WTA 500; Grass – €802,237 – 28S/24Q/16D; Singles – Doubles | (China) Wang Xinyu (China) Zheng Saisai; 6–2, 7–5 | (Chinese Taipei) Chan Hao-ching; Veronika Kudermetova | (United States) Coco Gauff; Victoria Azarenka | (Tunisia) Ons Jabeur (Czech Republic) Kateřina Siniaková (Kazakhstan) Elena Rybakina; Aryna Sabalenka |
| Jun 17 | Birmingham Classic; Birmingham, United Kingdom; WTA 250; Grass – $267,082 – 32S/24Q/16D; Singles – Doubles | (Kazakhstan) Yulia Putintseva; 6–1, 7–6^{(10–8)} | (Australia) Ajla Tomljanović | (Italy) Elisabetta Cocciaretto; Anastasia Potapova | Diana Shnaider (United States) Caroline Dolehide (Canada) Leylah Fernandez (Czech Republic) Barbora Krejčíková |
| Jun 17 | Birmingham Classic; Birmingham, United Kingdom; WTA 250; Grass – $267,082 – 32S/24Q/16D; Singles – Doubles | (Chinese Taipei) Hsieh Su-wei (Belgium) Elise Mertens; 6–1, 6–3 | (Japan) Miyu Kato (China) Zhang Shuai | (Italy) Elisabetta Cocciaretto; Anastasia Potapova | Diana Shnaider (United States) Caroline Dolehide (Canada) Leylah Fernandez (Czech Republic) Barbora Krejčíková |
| Jun 24 | Bad Homburg Open; Bad Homburg, Germany; WTA 500; Grass – €802,237 – 32S/8Q/16D; Singles – Doubles | Diana Shnaider; 6–3, 2–6, 6–3 | (Croatia) Donna Vekić | (United States) Emma Navarro (Bulgaria) Viktoriya Tomova | (Spain) Paula Badosa (Denmark) Caroline Wozniacki; Anna Blinkova (Czech Republic) Kateřina Siniaková |
| Jun 24 | Bad Homburg Open; Bad Homburg, Germany; WTA 500; Grass – €802,237 – 32S/8Q/16D; Singles – Doubles | (United States) Nicole Melichar-Martinez (Australia) Ellen Perez; 4–6, 6–3, [10–8] | (Chinese Taipei) Chan Hao-ching; Veronika Kudermetova | (United States) Emma Navarro (Bulgaria) Viktoriya Tomova | (Spain) Paula Badosa (Denmark) Caroline Wozniacki; Anna Blinkova (Czech Republic) Kateřina Siniaková |
| Jun 24 | Eastbourne International; Eastbourne, United Kingdom; WTA 500; Grass – $922,573 – 28S/24Q/16D; Singles – Doubles | Daria Kasatkina; 6–3, 6–4 | (Canada) Leylah Fernandez | (United States) Madison Keys (Italy) Jasmine Paolini | (United Kingdom) Harriet Dart (Czech Republic) Karolína Muchová (United Kingdom) Katie Boulter (United Kingdom) Emma Raducanu |
| Jun 24 | Eastbourne International; Eastbourne, United Kingdom; WTA 500; Grass – $922,573 – 28S/24Q/16D; Singles – Doubles | (Ukraine) Lyudmyla Kichenok (Latvia) Jeļena Ostapenko; 5–7, 7–6^{(7–2)}, [10–8] | (Canada) Gabriela Dabrowski (New Zealand) Erin Routliffe | (United States) Madison Keys (Italy) Jasmine Paolini | (United Kingdom) Harriet Dart (Czech Republic) Karolína Muchová (United Kingdom) Katie Boulter (United Kingdom) Emma Raducanu |

=== July ===
| Week | Tournament | Champions | Runners-up | Semifinalists | | Quarterfinalists |
|---|---|---|---|---|---|---|
| Jul 1 Jul 8 | Wimbledon; London, United Kingdom; Grand Slam; Grass – $ – 128S/64D/32X; Singles – Doubles – Mixed | (Czech Republic) Barbora Krejčíková; 6–2, 2–6, 6–4 | (Italy) Jasmine Paolini | (Kazakhstan) Elena Rybakina (Croatia) Donna Vekić | | (Latvia) Jeļena Ostapenko (Ukraine) Elina Svitolina (New Zealand) Lulu Sun (United States) Emma Navarro |
| Jul 1 Jul 8 | Wimbledon; London, United Kingdom; Grand Slam; Grass – $ – 128S/64D/32X; Singles – Doubles – Mixed | (Czech Republic) Kateřina Siniaková (United States) Taylor Townsend; 7–6^{(7–5)}, 7–6^{(7–1)} | (Canada) Gabriela Dabrowski (New Zealand) Erin Routliffe | (Kazakhstan) Elena Rybakina (Croatia) Donna Vekić | | (Latvia) Jeļena Ostapenko (Ukraine) Elina Svitolina (New Zealand) Lulu Sun (United States) Emma Navarro |
| Jul 1 Jul 8 | Wimbledon; London, United Kingdom; Grand Slam; Grass – $ – 128S/64D/32X; Singles – Doubles – Mixed | (Chinese Taipei) Hsieh Su-wei (Poland) Jan Zieliński; 6–4, 6–2 | (Mexico) Giuliana Olmos (Mexico) Santiago González | (Kazakhstan) Elena Rybakina (Croatia) Donna Vekić | | (Latvia) Jeļena Ostapenko (Ukraine) Elina Svitolina (New Zealand) Lulu Sun (United States) Emma Navarro |
| Jul 15 | Palermo Ladies Open; Palermo, Italy; WTA 250; Clay – $267,082 – 32S/24Q/16D; Singles – Doubles | (China) Zheng Qinwen; 6–4, 4–6, 6–2 | (Czech Republic) Karolína Muchová | (France) Diane Parry (Romania) Irina-Camelia Begu | | (Romania) Jaqueline Cristian (France) Chloé Paquet (United States) Ann Li (Australia) Astra Sharma |
| Jul 15 | Palermo Ladies Open; Palermo, Italy; WTA 250; Clay – $267,082 – 32S/24Q/16D; Singles – Doubles | Alexandra Panova; Yana Sizikova; 4–6, 6–3, [10–5] | (Spain) Yvonne Cavallé Reimers (Italy) Aurora Zantedeschi | (France) Diane Parry (Romania) Irina-Camelia Begu | | (Romania) Jaqueline Cristian (France) Chloé Paquet (United States) Ann Li (Australia) Astra Sharma |
| Jul 15 | Budapest Grand Prix; Budapest, Hungary; WTA 250; Clay – $267,082 – 32S/24Q/16D; Singles – Doubles | Diana Shnaider; 6–4, 6–4 | Aliaksandra Sasnovich | (Germany) Eva Lys (Slovakia) Anna Karolína Schmiedlová | | (Germany) Ella Seidel (Slovakia) Rebecca Šramková; Elina Avanesyan (Netherlands) Suzan Lamens |
| Jul 15 | Budapest Grand Prix; Budapest, Hungary; WTA 250; Clay – $267,082 – 32S/24Q/16D; Singles – Doubles | (Poland) Katarzyna Piter (Hungary) Fanny Stollár; 6–3, 3–6, [10–3] | (Kazakhstan) Anna Danilina; Irina Khromacheva | (Germany) Eva Lys (Slovakia) Anna Karolína Schmiedlová | | (Germany) Ella Seidel (Slovakia) Rebecca Šramková; Elina Avanesyan (Netherlands) Suzan Lamens |
| Jul 22 | Iași Open; Iași, Romania; WTA 250; Clay – $267,082 – 31S/24Q/16D; Singles – Doubles | Mirra Andreeva; 5–7, 7–5, 4–0 ret. | Elina Avanesyan | (Serbia) Olga Danilović (France) Chloé Paquet | | (Croatia) Lea Bošković (Hungary) Anna Bondár (Romania) Jaqueline Cristian (France) Séléna Janicijevic |
| Jul 22 | Iași Open; Iași, Romania; WTA 250; Clay – $267,082 – 31S/24Q/16D; Singles – Doubles | (Kazakhstan) Anna Danilina; Irina Khromacheva; 6–4, 6–2 | Alexandra Panova; Yana Sizikova | (Serbia) Olga Danilović (France) Chloé Paquet | | (Croatia) Lea Bošković (Hungary) Anna Bondár (Romania) Jaqueline Cristian (France) Séléna Janicijevic |
| Jul 22 | Prague Open; Prague, Czech Republic; WTA 250; Clay – $267,082 – 32S/24Q/16D; Singles – Doubles | (Poland) Magda Linette; 6–2, 6–1 | (Poland) Magdalena Fręch | (Czech Republic) Linda Nosková (Czech Republic) Laura Samson | | (Germany) Ella Seidel (Bulgaria) Viktoriya Tomova (Ukraine) Anhelina Kalinina; Oksana Selekhmeteva |
| Jul 22 | Prague Open; Prague, Czech Republic; WTA 250; Clay – $267,082 – 32S/24Q/16D; Singles – Doubles | (Czech Republic) Barbora Krejčíková (Czech Republic) Kateřina Siniaková; 6–3, 6–3 | (United States) Bethanie Mattek-Sands (Czech Republic) Lucie Šafářová | (Czech Republic) Linda Nosková (Czech Republic) Laura Samson | | (Germany) Ella Seidel (Bulgaria) Viktoriya Tomova (Ukraine) Anhelina Kalinina; Oksana Selekhmeteva |
| 29 Jul | Olympics; Paris, France; Clay – $ – 64S/32D/16X; Singles – Doubles – Mixed | Gold | Silver | Bronze | Fourth place | Quarterfinalists |
| 29 Jul | Olympics; Paris, France; Clay – $ – 64S/32D/16X; Singles – Doubles – Mixed | (China) Zheng Qinwen; 6–2, 6–3 | (Croatia) Donna Vekić | (Poland) Iga Świątek; 6–2, 6–1 | (Slovakia) Anna Karolína Schmiedlová | (United States) Danielle Collins (Germany) Angelique Kerber (Czech Republic) Barbora Krejčíková (Ukraine) Marta Kostyuk |
| 29 Jul | Olympics; Paris, France; Clay – $ – 64S/32D/16X; Singles – Doubles – Mixed | (Italy) Sara Errani (Italy) Jasmine Paolini; 2–6, 6–1, [10–7] | Mirra Andreeva; Diana Shnaider | (Spain) Cristina Bucșa (Spain) Sara Sorribes Tormo; 6–2, 6–2 | (Czech Republic) Karolína Muchová (Czech Republic) Linda Nosková | (United States) Danielle Collins (Germany) Angelique Kerber (Czech Republic) Barbora Krejčíková (Ukraine) Marta Kostyuk |
| 29 Jul | Olympics; Paris, France; Clay – $ – 64S/32D/16X; Singles – Doubles – Mixed | (Czech Republic) Kateřina Siniaková (Czech Republic) Tomáš Macháč; 6–2, 5–7, [10–8] | (China) Wang Xinyu (China) Zhang Zhizhen | (Canada) Gabriela Dabrowski (Canada) Félix Auger-Aliassime; 6–3, 7–6^{(7–2)} | (Netherlands) Demi Schuurs (Netherlands) Wesley Koolhof | (United States) Danielle Collins (Germany) Angelique Kerber (Czech Republic) Barbora Krejčíková (Ukraine) Marta Kostyuk |
| 29 Jul | Washington Open; Washington DC, United States; WTA 500; Hard – $922,573 – 28S/24Q/16D; Singles – Doubles | (Spain) Paula Badosa; 6–1, 4–6, 6–4 | (Czech Republic) Marie Bouzková | Aryna Sabalenka (United States) Caroline Dolehide | | Victoria Azarenka (United States) Robin Montgomery (United Kingdom) Emma Raducanu (United States) Amanda Anisimova |
| 29 Jul | Washington Open; Washington DC, United States; WTA 500; Hard – $922,573 – 28S/24Q/16D; Singles – Doubles | (United States) Asia Muhammad (United States) Taylor Townsend; 7–6^{(7–0)}, 6–3 | (China) Jiang Xinyu (Chinese Taipei) Wu Fang-hsien | Aryna Sabalenka (United States) Caroline Dolehide | | Victoria Azarenka (United States) Robin Montgomery (United Kingdom) Emma Raducanu (United States) Amanda Anisimova |

=== August ===
| Week | Tournament | Champions | Runners-up | Semifinalists | Quarterfinalists |
|---|---|---|---|---|---|
| Aug 5 | Canadian Open; Toronto, Canada; WTA 1000; Hard – $3,211,715 – 56S/32Q/28D; Singles – Doubles | (United States) Jessica Pegula; 6–3, 2–6, 6–1 | (United States) Amanda Anisimova | Diana Shnaider (United States) Emma Navarro | Liudmila Samsonova (United States) Peyton Stearns (United States) Taylor Townsend; Aryna Sabalenka |
| Aug 5 | Canadian Open; Toronto, Canada; WTA 1000; Hard – $3,211,715 – 56S/32Q/28D; Singles – Doubles | (United States) Caroline Dolehide (United States) Desirae Krawczyk; 7–6^{(7–2)}, 3–6, [10–7] | (Canada) Gabriela Dabrowski (New Zealand) Erin Routliffe | Diana Shnaider (United States) Emma Navarro | Liudmila Samsonova (United States) Peyton Stearns (United States) Taylor Townsend; Aryna Sabalenka |
| Aug 12 | Cincinnati Open; Mason, United States; WTA 1000; Hard – $3,211,715 – 56S/32Q/28D; Singles – Doubles | Aryna Sabalenka; 6–3, 7–5 | (United States) Jessica Pegula | (Poland) Iga Świątek (Spain) Paula Badosa | Mirra Andreeva; Liudmila Samsonova (Canada) Leylah Fernandez; Anastasia Pavlyuchenkova |
| Aug 12 | Cincinnati Open; Mason, United States; WTA 1000; Hard – $3,211,715 – 56S/32Q/28D; Singles – Doubles | (United States) Asia Muhammad (New Zealand) Erin Routliffe; 3–6, 6–1, [10–4] | (Canada) Leylah Fernandez (Kazakhstan) Yulia Putintseva | (Poland) Iga Świątek (Spain) Paula Badosa | Mirra Andreeva; Liudmila Samsonova (Canada) Leylah Fernandez; Anastasia Pavlyuchenkova |
| Aug 19 | Monterrey Open; Monterrey, Mexico; WTA 500; Hard – $922,573 – 28S/24Q/16D; Singles - Doubles | (Czech Republic) Linda Nosková; 7–6^{(8–6)}, 6–4 | (New Zealand) Lulu Sun | Ekaterina Alexandrova (United States) Emma Navarro | Erika Andreeva (China) Yuan Yue (Ukraine) Elina Svitolina (Poland) Magdalena Fręch |
| Aug 19 | Monterrey Open; Monterrey, Mexico; WTA 500; Hard – $922,573 – 28S/24Q/16D; Singles - Doubles | (China) Guo Hanyu (Romania) Monica Niculescu; 3–6, 6–3, [10–4] | (Mexico) Giuliana Olmos; Alexandra Panova | Ekaterina Alexandrova (United States) Emma Navarro | Erika Andreeva (China) Yuan Yue (Ukraine) Elina Svitolina (Poland) Magdalena Fręch |
| Aug 19 | Tennis in the Land; Cleveland, United States; WTA 250; Hard – $267,082 – 32S/24Q/16D; Singles – Doubles | (United States) McCartney Kessler; 1–6, 6–1, 7–5 | (Brazil) Beatriz Haddad Maia | (Czech Republic) Kateřina Siniaková; Anastasia Potapova | (France) Clara Burel (United States) Peyton Stearns (Netherlands) Arantxa Rus (Romania) Ana Bogdan |
| Aug 19 | Tennis in the Land; Cleveland, United States; WTA 250; Hard – $267,082 – 32S/24Q/16D; Singles – Doubles | (Spain) Cristina Bucșa (China) Xu Yifan; 3–6, 6–3, [10–6] | (Japan) Shuko Aoyama (Japan) Eri Hozumi | (Czech Republic) Kateřina Siniaková; Anastasia Potapova | (France) Clara Burel (United States) Peyton Stearns (Netherlands) Arantxa Rus (Romania) Ana Bogdan |
| Aug 26; Sep 2 | US Open; New York, United States; Grand Slam; Hard – $33,977,000 – 128S/64D/32X; Singles – Doubles – Mixed | Aryna Sabalenka; 7–5, 7–5 | (United States) Jessica Pegula | (Czech Republic) Karolína Muchová (United States) Emma Navarro | (Poland) Iga Świątek (Brazil) Beatriz Haddad Maia (Spain) Paula Badosa (China) Zheng Qinwen |
| Aug 26; Sep 2 | US Open; New York, United States; Grand Slam; Hard – $33,977,000 – 128S/64D/32X; Singles – Doubles – Mixed | (Ukraine) Lyudmyla Kichenok (Latvia) Jeļena Ostapenko; 6–4, 6–3 | (France) Kristina Mladenovic (China) Zhang Shuai | (Czech Republic) Karolína Muchová (United States) Emma Navarro | (Poland) Iga Świątek (Brazil) Beatriz Haddad Maia (Spain) Paula Badosa (China) Zheng Qinwen |
| Aug 26; Sep 2 | US Open; New York, United States; Grand Slam; Hard – $33,977,000 – 128S/64D/32X; Singles – Doubles – Mixed | (Italy) Sara Errani (Italy) Andrea Vavassori; 7–6^{(7–0)}, 7–5 | (United States) Taylor Townsend (United States) Donald Young | (Czech Republic) Karolína Muchová (United States) Emma Navarro | (Poland) Iga Świątek (Brazil) Beatriz Haddad Maia (Spain) Paula Badosa (China) Zheng Qinwen |

=== September ===
| Week | Tournament | Champions | Runners-up | Semifinalists | Quarterfinalists |
|---|---|---|---|---|---|
| Sep 9 | Guadalajara Open; Guadalajara, Mexico; WTA 500; Hard – $922,573 – 28S/24Q/16D; Singles – Doubles | (Poland) Magdalena Fręch; 7–6^{(7–5)}, 6–4 | (Australia) Olivia Gadecki | (France) Caroline Garcia (Colombia) Camila Osorio | (Canada) Marina Stakusic (Czech Republic) Marie Bouzková; Kamilla Rakhimova (Italy) Martina Trevisan |
| Sep 9 | Guadalajara Open; Guadalajara, Mexico; WTA 500; Hard – $922,573 – 28S/24Q/16D; Singles – Doubles | (Kazakhstan) Anna Danilina; Irina Khromacheva; 2–6, 7–5, [10–7] | (Georgia (country)) Oksana Kalashnikova; Kamilla Rakhimova | (France) Caroline Garcia (Colombia) Camila Osorio | (Canada) Marina Stakusic (Czech Republic) Marie Bouzková; Kamilla Rakhimova (Italy) Martina Trevisan |
| Sep 9 | Jasmin Open; Monastir, Tunisia; WTA 250; Hard – $267,082 – 32S/24Q/16D; Singles – Doubles | (United Kingdom) Sonay Kartal; 6–3, 7–5 | (Slovakia) Rebecca Šramková | (Germany) Eva Lys (Italy) Lucia Bronzetti | (Turkey) Zeynep Sönmez (Ukraine) Yuliia Starodubtseva (Croatia) Antonia Ružić (Spain) Sara Sorribes Tormo |
| Sep 9 | Jasmin Open; Monastir, Tunisia; WTA 250; Hard – $267,082 – 32S/24Q/16D; Singles – Doubles | Anna Blinkova (Egypt) Mayar Sherif; 2–6, 6–1, [10–8] | Alina Korneeva; Anastasia Zakharova | (Germany) Eva Lys (Italy) Lucia Bronzetti | (Turkey) Zeynep Sönmez (Ukraine) Yuliia Starodubtseva (Croatia) Antonia Ružić (Spain) Sara Sorribes Tormo |
| Sep 16 | Korea Open; Seoul, South Korea; WTA 500; Hard – $922,573 – 28S/24Q/16D; Singles – Doubles | (Brazil) Beatriz Haddad Maia; 1–6, 6–4, 6–1 | Daria Kasatkina | Diana Shnaider; Veronika Kudermetova | (United Kingdom) Emma Raducanu (Ukraine) Marta Kostyuk; Polina Kudermetova (Bulgaria) Viktoriya Tomova |
| Sep 16 | Korea Open; Seoul, South Korea; WTA 500; Hard – $922,573 – 28S/24Q/16D; Singles – Doubles | (United States) Nicole Melichar-Martinez; Liudmila Samsonova; 6–1, 6–0 | (Japan) Miyu Kato (China) Zhang Shuai | Diana Shnaider; Veronika Kudermetova | (United Kingdom) Emma Raducanu (Ukraine) Marta Kostyuk; Polina Kudermetova (Bulgaria) Viktoriya Tomova |
| Sep 16 | Thailand Open 2 Hua Hin, Thailand; WTA 250; Hard – $267,082 – 32S/24Q/16D; Singles – Doubles | (Slovakia) Rebecca Šramková; 6–4, 6–4 | (Germany) Laura Siegemund | (Netherlands) Arianne Hartono (Slovenia) Tamara Zidanšek | (Japan) Mai Hontama (Spain) Rebeka Masarova (Croatia) Jana Fett (Argentina) Nadia Podoroska |
| Sep 16 | Thailand Open 2 Hua Hin, Thailand; WTA 250; Hard – $267,082 – 32S/24Q/16D; Singles – Doubles | (Kazakhstan) Anna Danilina; Irina Khromacheva; 6–4, 7–5 | (Hong Kong) Eudice Chong (Japan) Moyuka Uchijima | (Netherlands) Arianne Hartono (Slovenia) Tamara Zidanšek | (Japan) Mai Hontama (Spain) Rebeka Masarova (Croatia) Jana Fett (Argentina) Nadia Podoroska |
| Sep 23; Sep 30 | China Open; Beijing, China; WTA 1000; Hard – $8,955,610 – 96S/48Q/32D; Singles – Doubles | (United States) Coco Gauff; 6–1, 6–3 | (Czech Republic) Karolína Muchová | (China) Zheng Qinwen (Spain) Paula Badosa | Aryna Sabalenka; Mirra Andreeva (Ukraine) Yuliia Starodubtseva (China) Zhang Shuai |
| Sep 23; Sep 30 | China Open; Beijing, China; WTA 1000; Hard – $8,955,610 – 96S/48Q/32D; Singles – Doubles | (Italy) Sara Errani (Italy) Jasmine Paolini; 6–4, 6–4 | (Chinese Taipei) Chan Hao-ching; Veronika Kudermetova | (China) Zheng Qinwen (Spain) Paula Badosa | Aryna Sabalenka; Mirra Andreeva (Ukraine) Yuliia Starodubtseva (China) Zhang Shuai |

=== October ===
| Week | Tournament | Champions | Runners-up | Semifinalists | Quarterfinalists |
|---|---|---|---|---|---|
| Oct 7 | Wuhan Open; Wuhan, China; WTA 1000; Hard – $3,221,715 – 56S/32Q/28D; Singles – Doubles | Aryna Sabalenka; 6–3, 5–7, 6–3 | (China) Zheng Qinwen | (United States) Coco Gauff (China) Wang Xinyu | (Poland) Magdalena Fręch (Poland) Magda Linette (Italy) Jasmine Paolini; Ekaterina Alexandrova |
| Oct 7 | Wuhan Open; Wuhan, China; WTA 1000; Hard – $3,221,715 – 56S/32Q/28D; Singles – Doubles | (Kazakhstan) Anna Danilina; Irina Khromacheva; 6–3, 7–6^{(8–6)} | (United States) Asia Muhammad (United States) Jessica Pegula | (United States) Coco Gauff (China) Wang Xinyu | (Poland) Magdalena Fręch (Poland) Magda Linette (Italy) Jasmine Paolini; Ekaterina Alexandrova |
| Oct 14 | Ningbo Open; Ningbo, China; WTA 500; Hard – $922,573 – 28S/24Q/16D; Singles – Doubles | Daria Kasatkina; 6–0, 4–6, 6–4 | Mirra Andreeva | (Spain) Paula Badosa (Czech Republic) Karolína Muchová | (Brazil) Beatriz Haddad Maia (Kazakhstan) Yulia Putintseva (Czech Republic) Barbora Krejčíková; Anna Kalinskaya |
| Oct 14 | Ningbo Open; Ningbo, China; WTA 500; Hard – $922,573 – 28S/24Q/16D; Singles – Doubles | (Netherlands) Demi Schuurs (China) Yuan Yue; 6–3, 6–3 | (United States) Nicole Melichar-Martinez (Australia) Ellen Perez | (Spain) Paula Badosa (Czech Republic) Karolína Muchová | (Brazil) Beatriz Haddad Maia (Kazakhstan) Yulia Putintseva (Czech Republic) Barbora Krejčíková; Anna Kalinskaya |
| Oct 14 | Japan Open; Osaka, Japan; WTA 250; Hard – $267,080 – 32S/24Q/16D; Singles – Doubles | (Netherlands) Suzan Lamens; 6–0, 6–4 | (Australia) Kimberly Birrell | (Japan) Aoi Ito (France) Diane Parry | (Germany) Eva Lys (Japan) Sara Saito (Romania) Ana Bogdan (Denmark) Clara Tauson |
| Oct 14 | Japan Open; Osaka, Japan; WTA 250; Hard – $267,080 – 32S/24Q/16D; Singles – Doubles | (Japan) Ena Shibahara (Germany) Laura Siegemund; 3–6, 6–2, [10–2] | (Spain) Cristina Bucșa (Romania) Monica Niculescu | (Japan) Aoi Ito (France) Diane Parry | (Germany) Eva Lys (Japan) Sara Saito (Romania) Ana Bogdan (Denmark) Clara Tauson |
| Oct 21 | Pan Pacific Open; Tokyo, Japan; WTA 500; Hard – $922,573 – 32S/24Q/16D; Singles – Doubles | (China) Zheng Qinwen; 7–6^{(7–5)}, 6–3 | (United States) Sofia Kenin | Diana Shnaider (United Kingdom) Katie Boulter | (Canada) Leylah Fernandez (Japan) Sayaka Ishii; Daria Kasatkina (Canada) Bianca Andreescu |
| Oct 21 | Pan Pacific Open; Tokyo, Japan; WTA 500; Hard – $922,573 – 32S/24Q/16D; Singles – Doubles | (Japan) Shuko Aoyama (Japan) Eri Hozumi; 6–4, 7–6^{(7–3)} | (Japan) Ena Shibahara (Germany) Laura Siegemund | Diana Shnaider (United Kingdom) Katie Boulter | (Canada) Leylah Fernandez (Japan) Sayaka Ishii; Daria Kasatkina (Canada) Bianca Andreescu |
| Oct 21 | Guangzhou Open; Guangzhou, China; WTA 250; Hard – $267,082 – 32S/24Q/16D; Singles – Doubles | (Serbia) Olga Danilović; 6–3, 6–1 | (United States) Caroline Dolehide | (Czech Republic) Kateřina Siniaková (Italy) Lucia Bronzetti | (United States) Bernarda Pera (Thailand) Mananchaya Sawangkaew (China) Wang Xiyu (Spain) Jéssica Bouzas Maneiro |
| Oct 21 | Guangzhou Open; Guangzhou, China; WTA 250; Hard – $267,082 – 32S/24Q/16D; Singles – Doubles | (Czech Republic) Kateřina Siniaková (China) Zhang Shuai; 6–4, 6–1 | (Poland) Katarzyna Piter (Hungary) Fanny Stollár | (Czech Republic) Kateřina Siniaková (Italy) Lucia Bronzetti | (United States) Bernarda Pera (Thailand) Mananchaya Sawangkaew (China) Wang Xiyu (Spain) Jéssica Bouzas Maneiro |
| Oct 28 | Jiangxi Open; Jiujiang, China; WTA 250; Hard – $267,082 – 32S/16Q/16D; Singles – Doubles | (Switzerland) Viktorija Golubic; 6–3, 7–5 | (Slovakia) Rebecca Šramková | (Czech Republic) Marie Bouzková (Germany) Laura Siegemund | Kamilla Rakhimova (Netherlands) Arantxa Rus (Thailand) Mananchaya Sawangkaew (Italy) Martina Trevisan |
| Oct 28 | Jiangxi Open; Jiujiang, China; WTA 250; Hard – $267,082 – 32S/16Q/16D; Singles – Doubles | (China) Guo Hanyu (Japan) Moyuka Uchijima; 7–6^{(7–5)}, 7–5 | (Poland) Katarzyna Piter (Hungary) Fanny Stollár | (Czech Republic) Marie Bouzková (Germany) Laura Siegemund | Kamilla Rakhimova (Netherlands) Arantxa Rus (Thailand) Mananchaya Sawangkaew (Italy) Martina Trevisan |
| Oct 28 | Mérida Open; Merida, Mexico; WTA 250; Hard – $267,082 – 32S/16Q/14D; Singles – Doubles | (Turkey) Zeynep Sönmez; 6–2, 6–1 | (United States) Ann Li | Alina Korneeva; Polina Kudermetova | (Mexico) Renata Zarazúa (Spain) Sara Sorribes Tormo (Switzerland) Jil Teichmann (Serbia) Nina Stojanović |
| Oct 28 | Mérida Open; Merida, Mexico; WTA 250; Hard – $267,082 – 32S/16Q/14D; Singles – Doubles | (United States) Quinn Gleason (Brazil) Ingrid Martins; 6–4, 6–4 | (Belgium) Magali Kempen (Belgium) Lara Salden | Alina Korneeva; Polina Kudermetova | (Mexico) Renata Zarazúa (Spain) Sara Sorribes Tormo (Switzerland) Jil Teichmann (Serbia) Nina Stojanović |
| Oct 28 | Hong Kong Open; Hong Kong, China; WTA 250; Hard – $267,082 – 32S/24Q/16D; Singles – Doubles | Diana Shnaider; 6–1, 6–2 | (United Kingdom) Katie Boulter | (Canada) Leylah Fernandez (China) Yuan Yue | (Netherlands) Suzan Lamens (United States) Bernarda Pera (United States) Sofia Kenin; Anastasia Zakharova |
| Oct 28 | Hong Kong Open; Hong Kong, China; WTA 250; Hard – $267,082 – 32S/24Q/16D; Singles – Doubles | (Norway) Ulrikke Eikeri (Japan) Makoto Ninomiya; 6–4, 4–6, [11–9] | (Japan) Shuko Aoyama (Japan) Eri Hozumi | (Canada) Leylah Fernandez (China) Yuan Yue | (Netherlands) Suzan Lamens (United States) Bernarda Pera (United States) Sofia Kenin; Anastasia Zakharova |

=== November ===
| Week | Tournament | Champions | Runners-up | Semifinalists | Quarterfinalists |
|---|---|---|---|---|---|
| Nov 4 | WTA Finals; Riyadh, Saudi Arabia; Year-end championships Hard (i) – $15,250,000 – 8S/8D; Singles – Doubles | (United States) Coco Gauff; 3–6, 6–4, 7–6^{(7–2)} | (China) Zheng Qinwen | Aryna Sabalenka (Czech Republic) Barbora Krejčíková | Round robin (Italy) Jasmine Paolini (Kazakhstan) Elena Rybakina (Poland) Iga Świątek; Daria Kasatkina (United States) Jessica Pegula |
| Nov 4 | WTA Finals; Riyadh, Saudi Arabia; Year-end championships Hard (i) – $15,250,000 – 8S/8D; Singles – Doubles | (Canada) Gabriela Dabrowski (New Zealand) Erin Routliffe; 7–5, 6–3 | (Czech Republic) Kateřina Siniaková (United States) Taylor Townsend | Aryna Sabalenka (Czech Republic) Barbora Krejčíková | Round robin (Italy) Jasmine Paolini (Kazakhstan) Elena Rybakina (Poland) Iga Świątek; Daria Kasatkina (United States) Jessica Pegula |
| Nov 11 | Billie Jean King Cup Finals; Málaga, Spain; Hard (i) – 12 teams | Italy; 2–0 | Slovakia | Great Britain; Poland | Canada; Australia; Czech Republic; Japan |

== Statistical information ==
These tables present the number of singles (S), doubles (D), and mixed doubles (X) titles won by each player and each nation during the season, within all the tournament categories of the 2024 WTA Tour: the Grand Slam tournaments, the tennis event at the Paris Summer Olympics, the year-end championships (the WTA Finals), the WTA Premier tournaments (WTA 1000 and WTA 500), and the WTA 250. The players/nations are sorted by:

1. total number of titles (a doubles title won by two players representing the same nation counts as only one win for the nation);
2. cumulated point value of those titles (one Grand Slam tournament win equaling two WTA 1000 wins, one year-end championships win equaling one-and-a-half WTA 1000 win, one WTA 1000 win equaling two WTA 500 wins, one WTA 500 win equaling two WTA 250 wins);
3. a singles > doubles > mixed doubles hierarchy;
4. alphabetical order (by family names for players).

=== Key ===
Grand Slam tournaments
Summer Olympics
Year-end championships
WTA 1000
WTA 500
WTA 250

=== Titles won by player ===
| Total | Player | Grand Slam | | | Summer Olympics | | | Year-end | | WTA 1000 | | WTA 500 | | WTA 250 | | Total | | |
| Total | Player | S | D | X | S | D | X | S | D | S | D | S | D | S | D | S | D | X |
|---|---|---|---|---|---|---|---|---|---|---|---|---|---|---|---|---|---|---|
| 6 | Kateřina Siniaková (CZE) | | ● ● | | | | ● | | | | ● | | | | ● ● | 0 | 5 | 1 |
| 6 | Irina Khromacheva (Note: As of 1 March 2022, the WTA announced that players from Russia and Belarus will not compete in tournaments under the name or flag of Russia or Belarus due to the Russian invasion of Ukraine.) | | | | | | | | | | ● | | ● | | ●●●● | 0 | 6 | 0 |
| 5 | Hsieh Su-wei (TPE) | | ● | ● ● | | | | | | | ● | | | | ● | 0 | 3 | 2 |
| 5 | Sara Errani (ITA) | | | ● | | ● | | | | | ● ● | | ● | | | 0 | 4 | 1 |
| 5 | Iga Świątek (POL) | ● | | | | | | | | ●●●● | | | | | | 5 | 0 | 0 |
| 5 | Jasmine Paolini (ITA) | | | | | ● | | | | ● | ● ● | | ● | | | 1 | 4 | 0 |
| 5 | Jeļena Ostapenko (LAT) | | ● | | | | | | | | | ● ● | ● ● | | | 2 | 3 | 0 |
| 5 | Anna Danilina (KAZ) | | | | | | | | | | ● | | ● | | ● ● ● | 0 | 5 | 0 |
| 4 | Aryna Sabalenka | ● ● | | | | | | | | ● ● | | | | | | 4 | 0 | 0 |
| 4 | Coco Gauff (USA) | | ● | | | | | ● | | ● | | | | ● | | 3 | 1 | 0 |
| 4 | Cristina Bucșa (ESP) | | | | | | | | | | ● | | ● | | ● ● | 0 | 4 | 0 |
| 4 | Diana Shnaider | | | | | | | | | | | ● | | ● ● ● | | 4 | 0 | 0 |
| 3 | Elise Mertens (BEL) | | ● | | | | | | | | ● | | | | ● | 0 | 3 | 0 |
| 3 | Lyudmyla Kichenok (UKR) | | ● | | | | | | | | | | ● ● | | | 0 | 3 | 0 |
| 3 | Taylor Townsend (USA) | | ● | | | | | | | | | | ● ● | | | 0 | 3 | 0 |
| 3 | Zheng Qinwen (CHN) | | | | ● | | | | | | | ● | | ● | | 3 | 0 | 0 |
| 3 | Erin Routliffe (NZL) | | | | | | | | ● | | ● | | | | ● | 0 | 3 | 0 |
| 3 | Asia Muhammad (USA) | | | | | | | | | | ● | | ● | | ● | 0 | 3 | 0 |
| 3 | Elena Rybakina (KAZ) | | | | | | | | | | | ● ● ● | | | | 3 | 0 | 0 |
| 3 | Nicole Melichar-Martinez (USA) | | | | | | | | | | | | ● ● ● | | | 0 | 3 | 0 |
| 2 | Barbora Krejčíková (CZE) | ● | | | | | | | | | | | | | ● | 1 | 1 | 0 |
| 2 | Laura Siegemund (GER) | | | ● | | | | | | | | | | | ● | 0 | 1 | 1 |
| 2 | Gabriela Dabrowski (CAN) | | | | | | | | ● | | | | | | ● | 0 | 2 | 0 |
| 2 | Danielle Collins (USA) | | | | | | | | | ● | | ● | | | | 2 | 0 | 0 |
| 2 | Jessica Pegula (USA) | | | | | | | | | ● | | ● | | | | 2 | 0 | 0 |
| 2 | Sofia Kenin (USA) | | | | | | | | | | ● | | ● | | | 0 | 2 | 0 |
| 2 | Bethanie Mattek-Sands (USA) | | | | | | | | | | ● | | ● | | | 0 | 2 | 0 |
| 2 | Demi Schuurs (NED) | | | | | | | | | | ● | | ● | | | 0 | 2 | 0 |
| 2 | Daria Kasatkina | | | | | | | | | | | ● ● | | | | 2 | 0 | 0 |
| 2 | Beatriz Haddad Maia (BRA) | | | | | | | | | | | ● | ● | | | 1 | 1 | 0 |
| 2 | Monica Niculescu (ROU) | | | | | | | | | | | | ● ● | | | 0 | 2 | 0 |
| 2 | Ellen Perez (AUS) | | | | | | | | | | | | ● ● | | | 0 | 2 | 0 |
| 2 | Katie Boulter (GBR) | | | | | | | | | | | ● | | ● | | 2 | 0 | 0 |
| 2 | Liudmila Samsonova | | | | | | | | | | | | ● | ● | | 1 | 1 | 0 |
| 2 | Sloane Stephens (USA) | | | | | | | | | | | | ● | ● | | 1 | 1 | 0 |
| 2 | Yuan Yue (CHN) | | | | | | | | | | | | ● | ● | | 1 | 1 | 0 |
| 2 | Chan Hao-ching (TPE) | | | | | | | | | | | | ● | | ● | 0 | 2 | 0 |
| 2 | Guo Hanyu (CHN) | | | | | | | | | | | | ● | | ● | 0 | 2 | 0 |
| 2 | Yana Sizikova | | | | | | | | | | | | | | ● ● | 0 | 2 | 0 |
| 1 | Caroline Dolehide (USA) | | | | | | | | | | ● | | | | | 0 | 1 | 0 |
| 1 | Storm Hunter (AUS) | | | | | | | | | | ● | | | | | 0 | 1 | 0 |
| 1 | Desirae Krawczyk (USA) | | | | | | | | | | ● | | | | | 0 | 1 | 0 |
| 1 | Sara Sorribes Tormo (ESP) | | | | | | | | | | ● | | | | | 0 | 1 | 0 |
| 1 | Luisa Stefani (BRA) | | | | | | | | | | ● | | | | | 0 | 1 | 0 |
| 1 | Paula Badosa (ESP) | | | | | | | | | | | ● | | | | 1 | 0 | 0 |
| 1 | Magdalena Fręch (POL) | | | | | | | | | | | ● | | | | 1 | 0 | 0 |
| 1 | Madison Keys (USA) | | | | | | | | | | | ● | | | | 1 | 0 | 0 |
| 1 | Linda Nosková (CZE) | | | | | | | | | | | ● | | | | 1 | 0 | 0 |
| 1 | Shuko Aoyama (JPN) | | | | | | | | | | | | ● | | | 0 | 1 | 0 |
| 1 | Eri Hozumi (JPN) | | | | | | | | | | | | ● | | | 0 | 1 | 0 |
| 1 | Ashlyn Krueger (USA) | | | | | | | | | | | | ● | | | 0 | 1 | 0 |
| 1 | Veronika Kudermetova | | | | | | | | | | | | ● | | | 0 | 1 | 0 |
| 1 | Wang Xinyu (CHN) | | | | | | | | | | | | ● | | | 0 | 1 | 0 |
| 1 | Zheng Saisai (CHN) | | | | | | | | | | | | ● | | | 0 | 1 | 0 |
| 1 | Mirra Andreeva | | | | | | | | | | | | | ● | | 1 | 0 | 0 |
| 1 | Olga Danilović (SRB) | | | | | | | | | | | | | ● | | 1 | 0 | 0 |
| 1 | Viktorija Golubic (SUI) | | | | | | | | | | | | | ● | | 1 | 0 | 0 |
| 1 | Sonay Kartal (GBR) | | | | | | | | | | | | | ● | | 1 | 0 | 0 |
| 1 | McCartney Kessler (USA) | | | | | | | | | | | | | ● | | 1 | 0 | 0 |
| 1 | Suzan Lamens (NED) | | | | | | | | | | | | | ● | | 1 | 0 | 0 |
| 1 | Magda Linette (POL) | | | | | | | | | | | | | ● | | 1 | 0 | 0 |
| 1 | Emma Navarro (USA) | | | | | | | | | | | | | ● | | 1 | 0 | 0 |
| 1 | Camila Osorio (COL) | | | | | | | | | | | | | ● | | 1 | 0 | 0 |
| 1 | Karolína Plíšková (CZE) | | | | | | | | | | | | | ● | | 1 | 0 | 0 |
| 1 | Yulia Putintseva (KAZ) | | | | | | | | | | | | | ● | | 1 | 0 | 0 |
| 1 | Zeynep Sönmez (TUR) | | | | | | | | | | | | | ● | | 1 | 0 | 0 |
| 1 | Rebecca Šramková (SVK) | | | | | | | | | | | | | ● | | 1 | 0 | 0 |
| 1 | Peyton Stearns (USA) | | | | | | | | | | | | | ● | | 1 | 0 | 0 |
| 1 | Tímea Babos (HUN) | | | | | | | | | | | | | | ● | 0 | 1 | 0 |
| 1 | Anna Blinkova | | | | | | | | | | | | | | ● | 0 | 1 | 0 |
| 1 | Ulrikke Eikeri (NOR) | | | | | | | | | | | | | | ● | 0 | 1 | 0 |
| 1 | Olivia Gadecki (AUS) | | | | | | | | | | | | | | ● | 0 | 1 | 0 |
| 1 | Quinn Gleason (USA) | | | | | | | | | | | | | | ● | 0 | 1 | 0 |
| 1 | Viktória Hrunčáková (SVK) | | | | | | | | | | | | | | ● | 0 | 1 | 0 |
| 1 | Miyu Kato (JPN) | | | | | | | | | | | | | | ● | 0 | 1 | 0 |
| 1 | Ingrid Martins (BRA) | | | | | | | | | | | | | | ● | 0 | 1 | 0 |
| 1 | Caty McNally (USA) | | | | | | | | | | | | | | ● | 0 | 1 | 0 |
| 1 | Ingrid Neel (EST) | | | | | | | | | | | | | | ● | 0 | 1 | 0 |
| 1 | Olivia Nicholls (GBR) | | | | | | | | | | | | | | ● | 0 | 1 | 0 |
| 1 | Makoto Ninomiya (JPN) | | | | | | | | | | | | | | ● | 0 | 1 | 0 |
| 1 | Giuliana Olmos (MEX) | | | | | | | | | | | | | | ● | 0 | 1 | 0 |
| 1 | Alexandra Panova | | | | | | | | | | | | | | ● | 0 | 1 | 0 |
| 1 | Katarzyna Piter (POL) | | | | | | | | | | | | | | ● | 0 | 1 | 0 |
| 1 | Kamilla Rakhimova | | | | | | | | | | | | | | ● | 0 | 1 | 0 |
| 1 | Bibiane Schoofs (NED) | | | | | | | | | | | | | | ● | 0 | 1 | 0 |
| 1 | Mayar Sherif (EGY) | | | | | | | | | | | | | | ● | 0 | 1 | 0 |
| 1 | Ena Shibahara (JPN) | | | | | | | | | | | | | | ● | 0 | 1 | 0 |
| 1 | Fanny Stollár (HUN) | | | | | | | | | | | | | | ● | 0 | 1 | 0 |
| 1 | Aldila Sutjiadi (INA) | | | | | | | | | | | | | | ● | 0 | 1 | 0 |
| 1 | Moyuka Uchijima (JPN) | | | | | | | | | | | | | | ● | 0 | 1 | 0 |
| 1 | Xu Yifan (CHN) | | | | | | | | | | | | | | ● | 0 | 1 | 0 |
| 1 | Zhang Shuai (CHN) | | | | | | | | | | | | | | ● | 0 | 1 | 0 |

=== Titles won by nation ===
| Total | Nation | Grand Slam | | | Summer Olympics | | | Year-end | | WTA 1000 | | WTA 500 | | WTA 250 | | Total | | |
| Total | Nation | S | D | X | S | D | X | S | D | S | D | S | D | S | D | S | D | X |
|---|---|---|---|---|---|---|---|---|---|---|---|---|---|---|---|---|---|---|
| 26 | United States (USA) | | 2 | | | | | 1 | | 3 | 3 | 3 | 7 | 5 | 2 | 12 | 14 | 0 |
| 10 | China (CHN) | | | | 1 | | | | | | | 1 | 3 | 2 | 3 | 4 | 6 | 0 |
| 9 | Czech Republic (CZE) | 1 | 2 | | | | 1 | | | | 1 | 1 | | 1 | 2 | 3 | 5 | 1 |
| 9 | Kazakhstan (KAZ) | | | | | | | | | | 1 | 3 | 1 | 1 | 3 | 4 | 5 | 0 |
| 8 | Poland (POL) | 1 | | | | | | | | 4 | | 1 | | 1 | 1 | 7 | 1 | 0 |
| 7 | Chinese Taipei (TPE) | | 1 | 2 | | | | | | | 1 | | 1 | | 2 | 0 | 5 | 2 |
| 6 | Italy (ITA) | | | 1 | | 1 | | | | 1 | 2 | | 1 | | | 1 | 4 | 1 |
| 5 | Latvia (LAT) | | 1 | | | | | | | | | 2 | 2 | | | 2 | 3 | 0 |
| 5 | Spain (ESP) | | | | | | | | | | 1 | 1 | 1 | | 2 | 1 | 4 | 0 |
| 5 | Japan (JPN) | | | | | | | | | | | | 1 | | 4 | 0 | 5 | 0 |
| 4 | Brazil (BRA) | | | | | | | | | | 1 | 1 | 1 | | 1 | 1 | 3 | 0 |
| 4 | Australia (AUS) | | | | | | | | | | 1 | | 2 | | 1 | 0 | 4 | 0 |
| 4 | Netherlands (NED) | | | | | | | | | | 1 | | 1 | 1 | 1 | 1 | 3 | 0 |
| 4 | Great Britain (GBR) | | | | | | | | | | | 1 | | 2 | 1 | 3 | 1 | 0 |
| 3 | Belgium (BEL) | | 1 | | | | | | | | 1 | | | | 1 | 0 | 3 | 0 |
| 3 | Ukraine (UKR) | | 1 | | | | | | | | | | 2 | | | 0 | 3 | 0 |
| 3 | New Zealand (NZL) | | | | | | | | 1 | | 1 | | | | 1 | 0 | 3 | 0 |
| 2 | Germany (GER) | | | 1 | | | | | | | | | | | 1 | 0 | 1 | 1 |
| 2 | Canada (CAN) | | | | | | | | 1 | | | | | | 1 | 0 | 2 | 0 |
| 2 | Romania (ROU) | | | | | | | | | | | | 2 | | | 0 | 2 | 0 |
| 2 | Slovakia (SVK) | | | | | | | | | | | | | 1 | 1 | 1 | 1 | 0 |
| 2 | Hungary (HUN) | | | | | | | | | | | | | | 2 | 0 | 2 | 0 |
| 1 | Colombia (COL) | | | | | | | | | | | | | 1 | | 1 | 0 | 0 |
| 1 | Serbia (SRB) | | | | | | | | | | | | | 1 | | 1 | 0 | 0 |
| 1 | Switzerland (SUI) | | | | | | | | | | | | | 1 | | 1 | 0 | 0 |
| 1 | Turkey (TUR) | | | | | | | | | | | | | 1 | | 1 | 0 | 0 |
| 1 | Egypt (EGY) | | | | | | | | | | | | | | 1 | 0 | 1 | 0 |
| 1 | Estonia (EST) | | | | | | | | | | | | | | 1 | 0 | 1 | 0 |
| 1 | Indonesia (INA) | | | | | | | | | | | | | | 1 | 0 | 1 | 0 |
| 1 | Mexico (MEX) | | | | | | | | | | | | | | 1 | 0 | 1 | 0 |
| 1 | Norway (NOR) | | | | | | | | | | | | | | 1 | 0 | 1 | 0 |

=== Titles information ===
The following players won their first main circuit title in singles, doubles, or mixed doubles:

Singles

- (United States) Emma Navarro (22 years, 240 days) – Hobart (draw)
- Diana Shnaider (19 years, 308 days) – Hua Hin 1 (draw)
- (China) Yuan Yue (25 years, 160 days) – Austin (draw)
- (United States) Peyton Stearns (22 years, 230 days) – Rabat (draw)
- Mirra Andreeva (17 years, 88 days) – Iași (draw)
- (United States) McCartney Kessler (25 years, 47 days) – Cleveland (draw)
- (Czech Republic) Linda Nosková (19 years, 281 days) – Monterrey (draw)
- (United Kingdom) Sonay Kartal (22 years, 323 days) – Monastir (draw)
- (Poland) Magdalena Fręch (26 years, 276 days) – Guadalajara (draw)
- (Slovakia) Rebecca Šramková (27 years, 339 days) – Hua Hin 2 (draw)
- (Netherlands) Suzan Lamens (25 years, 107 days) – Osaka (draw)
- (Turkey) Zeynep Sönmez (22 years, 188 days) – Mérida (draw)

Doubles

- (Australia) Olivia Gadecki – Austin (draw)
- (United States) Ashlyn Krueger – Charleston (draw)
- (United States) Sloane Stephens – Charleston (draw)
- (Egypt) Mayar Sherif – Monastir (draw)
- (China) Yuan Yue - Ningbo (draw)
- (Japan) Moyuka Uchijima – Jiangxi (draw)
- (United States) Quinn Gleason – Mérida (draw)

Mixed

- (Chinese Taipei) Hsieh Su-wei – **Australian Open** (draw)
- (Czech Republic) Kateřina Siniaková – 2024 Summer Olympics (draw)
- (Italy) Sara Errani – **US Open** (draw)

The following players defended a main circuit title in singles, doubles, or mixed doubles:

Singles

- (United States) Coco Gauff – Auckland (draw)
- Aryna Sabalenka – **Australian Open** (draw), Wuhan (draw)
- (Poland) Iga Świątek – Doha (draw), **French Open** (draw)
- (United Kingdom) Katie Boulter – Nottingham (draw)
- (China) Zheng Qinwen – Palermo (draw)
- (United States) Jessica Pegula – Toronto (draw)

Doubles

- (United States) Taylor Townsend – Adelaide (draw)
- Yana Sizikova – Rabat (draw), Palermo (draw)
- (Poland) Katarzyna Piter – Budapest (draw)
- (Hungary) Fanny Stollár – Budapest (draw)

=== Best ranking ===
The following players achieved their career-high ranking in this season inside top 50 (players who made their top 10 debut indicated in bold): (Note: Name and ranking in bold means the player entered the top 10 or became world No. 1 for the first time this year, and only the ranking in bold means the player had entered the top 10 in a previous season (before 2024) but reached a new career-high ranking this year.)

Singles

- (France) Varvara Gracheva (reached place No. 39 on January 8)
- (Germany) Tatjana Maria (reached place No. 42 on January 8)
- Ekaterina Alexandrova (reached place No. 15 on April 1)
- (Italy) Lucia Bronzetti (reached place No. 46 on April 8)
- (China) Yuan Yue (reached place No. 36 on May 20)
- (United States) Coco Gauff (reached place **No. 2** on June 10)
- (France) Clara Burel (reached place No. 42 on June 10)
- (Ukraine) Marta Kostyuk (reached place No. 16 on June 17)
- (Czech Republic) Kateřina Siniaková (reached place No. 27 on June 24)
- (Bulgaria) Viktoriya Tomova (reached place No. 46 on July 29)
- (United States) Taylor Townsend (reached place No. 46 on August 19)
- (Czech Republic) Linda Nosková (reached place No. 25 on August 26)
- (United States) **Emma Navarro** (reached place **No. 8** on September 9)
- (New Zealand) Lulu Sun (reached place No. 39 on September 9)
- (Croatia) Donna Vekić (reached place No. 18 on October 7)
- (Italy) **Jasmine Paolini** (reached place **No. 4** on October 28)
- Anna Kalinskaya (reached place No. 11 on October 28)
- Mirra Andreeva (reached place No. 16 on October 28)
- (Poland) Magdalena Fręch (reached place No. 22 on October 28)
- (Armenia) Elina Avanesyan (reached place No. 43 on October 28)
- (France) Diane Parry (reached place No. 48 on October 28)
- Diana Shnaider (reached place No. 12 on November 4)
- (United Kingdom) Katie Boulter (reached place No. 23 on November 4)
- (Slovakia) Rebecca Šramková (reached place No. 43 on November 4)
- (China) **Zheng Qinwen** (reached place **No. 5** on November 11)

Doubles

- (Japan) Miyu Kato (reached place No. 26 on January 1)
- (Belgium) Greet Minnen (reached place No. 45 on January 8)
- (Germany) Laura Siegemund (reached place **No. 4** on January 29)
- (Chinese Taipei) Wu Fang-hsien (reached place No. 45 on January 29)
- Vera Zvonareva (reached place **No. 7** on February 19)
- (Australia) Ellen Perez (reached place **No. 7** on April 22)
- (Norway) Ulrikke Eikeri (reached place No. 26 on April 22)
- (Czech Republic) Marie Bouzková (reached place No. 15 on May 6)
- (Spain) Sara Sorribes Tormo (reached place No. 17 on May 6)
- (Estonia) Ingrid Neel (reached place No. 33 on May 6)
- (China) Xinyu Wang (reached place No. 16 on May 20)
- (Spain) Cristina Bucșa (reached place No. 19 on June 10)
- (New Zealand) **Erin Routliffe** (reached place **No. 1** on July 15)
- (Canada) Gabriela Dabrowski (reached place **No. 3** on July 15)
- (China) Jiang Xinyu (reached place No. 39 on August 12)
- (United States) Desirae Krawczyk (reached place **No. 7** on August 19)
- (United States) **Caroline Dolehide** (reached place **No. 9** on August 26)
- (Ukraine) Lyudmyla Kichenok (reached place **No. 3** on September 23)
- (Italy) **Jasmine Paolini** (reached place **No. 9** on October 7)
- (United States) Sofia Kenin (reached place No. 22 on October 7)
- (China) Guo Hanyu (reached place No. 34 on October 7)
- Diana Shnaider (reached place No. 48 on October 7)
- (Latvia) Jeļena Ostapenko (reached place **No. 4** on October 28)
- (United States) Asia Muhammad (reached place No. 14 on October 28)
- Irina Khromacheva (reached place No. 17 on October 28)
- Alexandra Panova (reached place No. 30 on October 28)
- (United Kingdom) Olivia Nicholls (reached place No. 38 on October 28)
- (Slovakia) Tereza Mihalíková (reached place No. 41 on October 28)

== WTA rankings ==
=== Singles ===
Final Singles Race rankings
| No. | Player | Points | Tourn |
|---|---|---|---|
| 1 | Aryna Sabalenka | 9,016 | 20 |
| 2 | Iga Świątek (POL) | 7,970 | 20 |
| 3 | **Coco Gauff** (USA) | 5,230 | 21 |
| 4 | Jasmine Paolini (ITA) | 5,144 | 19 |
| 5 | Elena Rybakina (KAZ) | 4,971 | 19 |
| 6 | Jessica Pegula (USA) | 4,705 | 19 |
| 7 | Zheng Qinwen (CHN) | 4,540 | 20 |
| 8 | Emma Navarro (USA) | 3,568 | 22 |
| 9 | Daria Kasatkina | 3,368 | 24 |
| 10 | Danielle Collins (USA) | 3,178 | 19 |
| 11 | Paula Badosa (ESP) | 2,908 | 20 |
| 12 | Barbora Krejčíková (CZE) | 2,814 | 16 |
| 13 | Anna Kalinskaya | 2,743 | 20 |
| 14 | Diana Shnaider | 2,599 | 24 |
| 15 | Jeļena Ostapenko (LAT) | 2,588 | 21 |
| 16 | Mirra Andreeva | 2,578 | 17 |
| 17 | Beatriz Haddad Maia (BRA) | 2,554 | 26 |
| 18 | Marta Kostyuk (UKR) | 2,493 | 21 |
| 19 | Donna Vekic (CRO) | 2,258 | 21 |
| 20 | Victoria Azarenka | 2,127 | 17 |

WTA Singles Year-End Rankings
| # | Player | Points | #Trn | '23 Rk | High | Low | '23→'24 |
|---|---|---|---|---|---|---|---|
| 1 | Aryna Sabalenka | 9,416 | 21 | 2 | 1 | 3 | ▲1 |
| 2 | Iga Świątek (POL) | 8,370 | 21 | 1 | 1 | 2 | ▼1 |
| 3 | Coco Gauff (USA) | 6,530 | 22 | 3 | 2 | 6 | Steady |
| 4 | Jasmine Paolini (ITA) | 5,344 | 20 | 30 | 4 | 31 | ▲26 |
| 5 | Zheng Qinwen (CHN) | 5,340 | 21 | 15 | 5 | 15 | ▲10 |
| 6 | Elena Rybakina (KAZ) | 5,171 | 20 | 4 | 3 | 6 | ▼2 |
| 7 | Jessica Pegula (USA) | 4,705 | 20 | 5 | 4 | 7 | ▼2 |
| 8 | Emma Navarro (USA) | 3,589 | 22 | 38 | 8 | 31 | ▲30 |
| 9 | Daria Kasatkina | 3,368 | 25 | 18 | 9 | 18 | ▲9 |
| 10 | Barbora Krejčíková (CZE) | 3,214 | 17 | 10 | 8 | 32 | Steady |
| 11 | Danielle Collins (USA) | 3,178 | 19 | 55 | 8 | 71 | ▲44 |
| 12 | Paula Badosa (ESP) | 2,908 | 20 | 66 | 11 | 140 | ▲54 |
| 13 | Diana Shnaider | 2,895 | 24 | 60 | 12 | 108 | ▲47 |
| 14 | Anna Kalinskaya | 2,743 | 20 | 77 | 11 | 80 | ▲63 |
| 15 | Jeļena Ostapenko (LAT) | 2,588 | 21 | 13 | 9 | 15 | ▼2 |
| 16 | Mirra Andreeva | 2,578 | 17 | 46 | 16 | 58 | ▲30 |
| 17 | Beatriz Haddad Maia (BRA) | 2,554 | 26 | 11 | 10 | 23 | ▼6 |
| 18 | Marta Kostyuk (UKR) | 2,493 | 21 | 39 | 16 | 41 | ▲21 |
| 19 | Donna Vekić (CRO) | 2,258 | 21 | 23 | 18 | 49 | ▲4 |
| 20 | Victoria Azarenka | 2,127 | 17 | 22 | 16 | 33 | ▲2 |

==== No. 1 ranking ====
| Holder | Date gained | Date forfeited |
|---|---|---|
| Iga Świątek (POL) | **Year-end 2023** | 20 October 2024 |
| Aryna Sabalenka | 21 October 2024 | **Year-end 2024** |

=== Doubles ===
Final Doubles Race rankings
| No. | Player | Points | Tourn |
|---|---|---|---|
| 1 | Lyudmyla Kichenok (UKR); Jeļena Ostapenko (LAT) ✓ | 5,948 | 15 |
| 2 | **Gabriela Dabrowski** (CAN); **Erin Routliffe** (NZL) ✓ | 5,425 | 16 |
| 3 | Hsieh Su-wei (TPE); Elise Mertens (BEL) ✓ | 5,130 | 13 |
| 4 | Sara Errani (ITA); Jasmine Paolini (ITA) ✓ | 5,045 | 14 |
| 5 | Caroline Dolehide (USA); Desirae Krawczyk (USA) ✓ | 4,363 | 17 |
| 6 | Nicole Melichar-Martinez (USA); Ellen Perez (AUS) ✓ | 4,020 | 22 |
| 7 | Chan Hao-ching (TPE); Veronika Kudermetova ✓ | 3,818 | 12 |
| 8 | Sofia Kenin (USA); Bethanie Mattek-Sands (USA) | 3,345 | 14 |
| 9 | Kateřina Siniaková (CZE); Taylor Townsend (USA) ✓ | 3,221 | 6 |
| 10 | Demi Schuurs (NED); Luisa Stefani (BRA) | 2,840 | 16 |

**Champions** in bold
Runners-up in italics

Qualified for the WTA Finals.

WTA Doubles Year-End Rankings
| # | Player | Points | #Trn | '23 Rk | High | Low | '23→'24 |
|---|---|---|---|---|---|---|---|
| 1 | Kateřina Siniaková (CZE) | 9,530 | 17 | 10 | 1 | 23 | ▲9 |
| 2 | Erin Routliffe (NZL) | 8,165 | 24 | 11 | 1 | 10 | ▲9 |
| 3 | Gabriela Dabrowski (CAN) | 6,805 | 17 | 8 | 3 | 8 | ▲5 |
| 4 | Lyudmyla Kichenok (UKR) | 6,165 | 21 | 35 | 3 | 32 | ▲31 |
| 5 | Taylor Townsend (USA) | 6,108 | 15 | 7 | 5 | 26 | ▲2 |
| 6 | Jeļena Ostapenko (LAT) | 5,948 | 16 | 36 | 4 | 34 | ▲30 |
| 7 | Hsieh Su-wei (TPE) | 5,506 | 18 | 6 | 1 | 8 | ▼1 |
| 8 | Sara Errani (ITA) | 5,456 | 19 | 125 | 7 | 130 | ▲117 |
| 9 | Elise Mertens (BEL) | 5,430 | 17 | 2 | 1 | 9 | ▼6 |
| 10 | Jasmine Paolini (ITA) | 5,235 | 17 | 97 | 9 | 98 | ▲87 |
| 11 | Desirae Krawczyk (USA) | 4,858 | 24 | 16 | 7 | 16 | ▲5 |
| 12 | Nicole Melichar-Martinez (USA) | 4,670 | 26 | 15 | 7 | 15 | ▲3 |
| 13 | Ellen Perez (AUS) | 4,560 | 27 | 17 | 7 | 17 | ▲4 |
| 14 | Caroline Dolehide (USA) | 4,483 | 20 | 40 | 9 | 51 | ▲26 |
| 15 | Asia Muhammad (USA) | 4,348 | 24 | 50 | 14 | 76 | ▲35 |
| 16 | Chan Hao-ching (TPE) | 4,250 | 26 | 21 | 16 | 28 | ▲5 |
| 17 | Veronika Kudermetova | 4,120 | 19 | 29 | 17 | 66 | ▲12 |
| 18 | Irina Khromacheva | 3,881 | 30 | 65 | 17 | 69 | ▲47 |
| 19 | Cristina Bucșa (ESP) | 3,758 | 24 | 66 | 19 | 66 | ▲47 |
| 20 | Bethanie Mattek-Sands (USA) | 3,726 | 23 | 51 | 18 | 59 | ▲31 |

==== No. 1 ranking ====
| Holder | Date gained | Date forfeited |
|---|---|---|
| Storm Hunter (AUS) | **Year-end 2023** | 28 January 2024 |
| Elise Mertens (BEL) | 29 January 2024 | 17 March 2024 |
| Hsieh Su-wei (TPE) | 18 March 2024 | 9 June 2024 |
| Elise Mertens (BEL) | 10 June 2024 | 14 July 2024 |
| Erin Routliffe (NZL) | 15 July 2024 | 8 September 2024 |
| Kateřina Siniaková (CZE) | 9 September 2024 | **Year-end 2024** |

== Points distribution ==
Points are awarded as follows:

| Category | W | F | SF | QF | R16 | R32 | R64 | R128 | Q | Q3 | Q2 | Q1 |
| Grand Slam (S) | 2000 | 1300 | 780 | 430 | 240 | 130 | 70 | 10 | 40 | 30 | 20 | 2 |
| Grand Slam (D) | 2000 | 1300 | 780 | 430 | 240 | 130 | 10 | – | – | – | – | – |
| WTA Finals (S/D) | 1500* | 1000* | 600* | (+200 per round robin win) | | | | | | | | |
| WTA 1000 (96S) | 1000 | 650 | 390 | 215 | 120 | 65 | 35 | 10 | 30 | – | 20 | 2 |
| WTA 1000 (64/56S) | 1000 | 650 | 390 | 215 | 120 | 65 | 10 | – | 30 | – | 20 | 2 |
| WTA 1000 (28/32D) | 1000 | 650 | 390 | 215 | 120 | 10 | – | – | – | – | – | – |
| WTA 500 (64/56/48S) | 500 | 325 | 195 | 108 | 60 | 32 | 1 | – | 25 | – | 13 | 1 |
| WTA 500 (32/30/28S) | 500 | 325 | 195 | 108 | 60 | 1 | – | – | 25 | – | 13 | 1 |
| WTA 500 (28D) | 500 | 325 | 195 | 108 | 60 | 1 | – | – | – | – | – | – |
| WTA 500 (16D) | 500 | 325 | 195 | 108 | 1 | – | – | – | – | – | – | – |
| WTA 250 (32S, 24/16Q) | 250 | 163 | 98 | 54 | 30 | 1 | – | – | 18 | – | 12 | 1 |
| WTA 250 (16D) | 250 | 163 | 98 | 54 | 1 | – | – | – | – | – | – | – |
| United Cup | 500 (max) | For details, see 2024 United Cup | | | | | | | | | | |

S = singles players, D = doubles teams, Q = qualification players
* Assumes undefeated round robin match record

== Prize money leaders ==
Prize money in US$ for the 2024 season
| # | Player | Singles | Doubles | Total |
|---|---|---|---|---|
| 1. | Aryna Sabalenka | $9,729,260 | $0 | $9,729,260 |
| 2. | (United States) Coco Gauff | $8,800,987 | $472,860 | $9,353,847 |
| 3. | (Poland) Iga Świątek | $8,550,693 | $0 | $8,550,693 |
| 4. | (Italy) Jasmine Paolini | $5,024,205 | $796,593 | $5,820,798 |
| 5. | (China) Zheng Qinwen | $5,559,555 | $0 | $5,559,555 |
| 6. | (Czech Republic) Barbora Krejčíková | $4,522,510 | $247,830 | $4,770,340 |
| 7. | (United States) Jessica Pegula | $4,021,226 | $165,396 | $4,186,622 |
| 8. | (Kazakhstan) Elena Rybakina | $3,876,915 | $0 | $3,876,915 |
| 9. | (Belgium) Elise Mertens | $1,186,903 | $1,596,511 | $2,783,414 |
| 10. | (United States) Emma Navarro | $2,674,666 | $77,302 | $2,751,968 |

== Retirements ==
The following is a list of notable players (winners of a main tour title, and/or part of the WTA rankings top 100 in singles, or top 100 in doubles, for at least one week) who announced their retirement from professional tennis, became inactive (after not playing for more than 52 weeks), or were permanently banned from playing, during the 2024 season:

- (Romania) Alexandra Cadanțu-Ignatik joined the professional tour in 2005 and reached a career-high ranking of No. 59 in singles in January 2014. She won one doubles title. Cadanțu-Ignatik announced her retirement from professional tennis in June 2024.
- (France) Alizé Cornet joined the professional tour in 2006 and reached a career-high ranking of No. 11 in singles in February 2009 and No. 59 in doubles in March 2011. She has won six singles and three doubles titles. Cornet announced her retirement from tennis after the 2024 French Open, where she received a wild card.
- (Italy) Camila Giorgi joined the professional tour in 2006 and reached a career-high ranking of No. 26 in singles in October 2018. She won four singles titles. Giorgi became listed as a retired player on the ITIA website, with her retirement date marked as 7 May 2024. She officially announced her retirement from professional tennis six days later.
- (United States) Alexa Glatch became listed as a retired player on the ITIA website, with her retirement date marked as 31 May 2024. She reached a career high doubles ranking of No. 98 in October 2009.
- (Chile) Alexa Guarachi announced her retirement in April 2024.
- (South Korea) Han Na-lae joined the professional tour in 2011 and reached a career-high ranking of No. 95 in doubles in November 2022. Han announced in May 2024 that she would retire at the end of the season. She made her final appearance at the Korean National Sports Festival.
- (Germany) Angelique Kerber announced her retirement from professional tennis in July 2024, with the 2024 Paris Olympics to be her final tournament. She is a three-time Grand Slam champion, Olympic silver medalist and former world number 1. She played her last match at the Olympics where she reached the quarterfinals before losing to the final champion Zheng Qinwen in a three-set thriller.
- Vera Lapko announced her retirement from professional tennis in January 2024.
- (Spain) Garbiñe Muguruza announced the end of her tennis career at a press conference in Madrid in April 2024. She is a two-time Grand Slam champion and former world number 1.
- (Romania) Raluca Olaru joined the professional tour in 2003 and reached a career-high ranking of No. 53 in singles in July 2009 and No. 30 in doubles in January 2022. She won eleven doubles titles. Olaru announced her retirement from professional tennis in June 2024.
- (Netherlands) Lesley Pattinama Kerkhove joined the professional tour in 2008 and reached a career-high ranking of No. 58 in doubles in June 2018. She won one doubles title. Pattinama Kerkhove announced her retirement from professional tennis in July 2024.
- (United States) Shelby Rogers joined the professional tour in 2010 and reached a career-high ranking of No. 30 in singles in August 2022 and No. 40 in doubles in February 2022. Rogers announced her retirement from professional tennis in August 2024, with the 2024 US Open to be her final tournament.
- (Belgium) Alison Van Uytvanck joined the professional tour in 2010 and reached a career-high ranking of No. 37 in singles in August 2018 and No. 66 in doubles in May 2022. She won five singles and two doubles titles. Van Uytvanck announced her retirement from professional tennis in August 2024 after struggles with injury.
- Elena Vesnina announced her retirement from professional tennis in November 2024. She is a five-time major doubles champion, Olympic gold medalist and former doubles world No. 1. She also reached a career-high singles ranking of No. 13 and won three singles titles. Vesnina made her final appearance at the 2024 Olympics in Paris.
- Natalia Vikhlyantseva became listed as a retired player on the ITIA website, with her retirement date marked as 23 June 2024. She reached a career high singles ranking of No. 54 in October 2017.

=== Inactivity ===
==== Maternity ====
- (Switzerland) Belinda Bencic
- (Czech Republic) Petra Kvitová
- (Germany) Sabine Lisicki
- (United States) Alison Riske-Amritraj

== Comebacks ==
- (Switzerland) Belinda Bencic made her comeback to the ITF circuit at an event in Hamburg in October.
- (Kazakhstan) Zarina Diyas made her comeback in May on the ITF Tour in Japan after two years of absence.
- (Romania) Simona Halep announced her comeback at the 2024 Miami Open as a wildcard.
- (Germany) Angelique Kerber made her comeback at the 2024 United Cup.
- (Netherlands) Michaëlla Krajicek made her comeback at the W15 Sharm El Sheikh as a wildcard.
- (France) Alizé Lim made her comeback in March to the ITF circuit after close to two years of inactivity.
- (United States) Christina McHale made her comeback in November to the ITF circuit after more than two years of inactivity, following her retirement in September 2022.
- (Japan) Naomi Osaka made her comeback at the 2024 Brisbane International.
- (Poland) Alicja Rosolska planned to return to the Tour to participate at the 2024 Summer Olympics in doubles.
- (Czech Republic) Lucie Šafářová announced her comeback on the WTA tour in doubles in March 2024 at the Prague Open where she received a wildcard together with Bethanie Mattek-Sands.
- Elena Vesnina announced her comeback in the 2024 season, returning at the 2024 Mutua Madrid Open.
- (China) Wang Qiang made her comeback at the 2024 Thailand Open.
- (China) Zheng Saisai made her comeback at the 2024 Thailand Open as a wildcard in qualifying.

== See also ==
- 2024 ATP Tour
- 2024 WTA 125 tournaments
- 2024 ITF Women's World Tennis Tour
