= 2024 Credit One Charleston Open =

- Date: April 1–7
- Edition: 52nd
- Category: WTA 500
- Draw: 48S / 16D
- Prize money: $922,573
- Surface: Green clay / outdoor
- Location: Charleston, SC, United States
- Venue: Family Circle Tennis Center

Champions

Singles
- (United States) Danielle Collins

Doubles
- (United States) Ashlyn Krueger / (United States) Sloane Stephens
- Charleston Open

The 2024 Charleston Open (branded as the Credit One Charleston Open for sponsorship reasons) was a professional women's tennis tournament played on outdoor clay courts at the Family Circle Tennis Center on Daniel Island in Charleston, South Carolina. It was the 52nd edition of the tournament on the WTA Tour and was classified as a WTA 500 tournament on the 2024 WTA Tour. It was the only event of the clay court season played on green clay.

== Champions ==
=== Singles ===
- (United States) Danielle Collins def. Daria Kasatkina, 6–2, 6–1

=== Doubles ===
- (United States) Ashlyn Krueger / (United States) Sloane Stephens def. (Ukraine) Lyudmyla Kichenok / (Ukraine) Nadiia Kichenok 1–6, 6–3, [10–7]

== Points and prize money ==
=== Point distribution ===
Event	W	F	SF	QF	Round of 16	Round of 32	Round of 56	Q	Q2	Q1
Singles	500	325	195	108	60	32	1	25	13	1
Doubles	500	325	195	108	1	—N/a	—N/a	—N/a	—N/a	—N/a

=== Prize money ===
Event	W	F	SF	QF	Round of 16	Round of 32	Round of 56^{1}	Q2	Q1
Singles	$142,000	$87,665	$44,286	$22,146	$11,190	$6,940	$5,540	$3,536	$1,768
Doubles *	$47,390	$28,720	$16,430	$8,510	$5,140	—N/a	—N/a	—N/a	—N/a

_{^{1} Qualifiers prize money is also the Round of 56 prize money}
_{* per team}

== Singles main draw entrants ==
=== Seeds ===
Country	Player	Rank^{1}	Seed
USA	Jessica Pegula	5	1
TUN	Ons Jabeur	6	2
GRE	Maria Sakkari	9	3
	Daria Kasatkina	11	4
BRA	Beatriz Haddad Maia	13	5
	Ekaterina Alexandrova	16	6
UKR	Elina Svitolina	17	7
USA	Madison Keys	18	8
	Veronika Kudermetova	19	9
USA	Emma Navarro	20	10
BEL	Elise Mertens	28	11
	Victoria Azarenka	32	12
UKR	Dayana Yastremska	33	13
CAN	Leylah Fernandez	35	14
UKR	Anhelina Kalinina	36	15
UKR	Lesia Tsurenko	40	16

- ^{1} Rankings as of March 18, 2024.

=== Other entrants ===
The following players received wildcards into the main draw:

- (Brazil) Beatriz Haddad Maia
- (United States) Clervie Ngounoue
- (United States) Shelby Rogers
- (Denmark) Caroline Wozniacki

The following player received entry using a protected ranking into the main draw:

- (United States) Amanda Anisimova

The following players received entry from the qualifying draw:

- (France) Varvara Gracheva
- (Romania) Gabriela Lee
- (United States) Claire Liu
- (Australia) Daria Saville
- (United States) Sachia Vickery
- (United States) Katie Volynets

The following players received entry as lucky losers:

- (United States) McCartney Kessler
- (Australia) Astra Sharma

=== Withdrawals ===
- (Switzerland) Viktorija Golubic → replaced by (Romania) Jaqueline Cristian
- (Ukraine) Marta Kostyuk → replaced by (Bulgaria) Viktoriya Tomova
- (Authorised Neutral Athletes) Anna Kalinskaya → replaced by (United States) McCartney Kessler
- (Czech Republic) Barbora Krejčíková → replaced by (United States) Kayla Day
- (Latvia) Jeļena Ostapenko → replaced by (France) Alizé Cornet
- (France) Diane Parry → replaced by (United States) Taylor Townsend
- (China) Wang Yafan → replaced by (Germany) Tamara Korpatsch
- (China) Yuan Yue → replaced by (Kazakhstan) Yulia Putintseva → replaced by (Australia) Astra Sharma

== Doubles main draw entrants ==
=== Seeds ===
Country	Player	Country	Player	Rank^{1}	Seed
USA	Nicole Melichar-Martinez	AUS	Ellen Perez	15	1
USA	Caroline Dolehide	USA	Desirae Krawczyk	42	2
JPN	Miyu Kato	INA	Aldila Sutjiadi	63	3
KAZ	Anna Danilina	MEX	Giuliana Olmos	69	4

- Rankings are as of March 18, 2024.

=== Other entrants ===
The following pairs received wildcards into the doubles main draw:

- (United States) McCartney Kessler / (United States) Clervie Ngounoue
- (United States) Ashlyn Krueger / (United States) Sloane Stephens
