= 2024 Credit One Charleston Open – Doubles =

Doubles
- 2024 Credit One Charleston Open

Final
- Champions: (United States) Ashlyn Krueger (United States) Sloane Stephens
- Runners-up: (Ukraine) Lyudmyla Kichenok (Ukraine) Nadiia Kichenok
- Score: 1–6, 6–3, [10–7]

Details
- Draw: 16
- Seeds: 4

Events
Singles	Doubles
← 2023 ·	Charleston Open	· 2025 →

Ashlyn Krueger and Sloane Stephens defeated Lyudmyla and Nadiia Kichenok in the final, 1–6, 6–3, [10–7] to win the doubles tennis title at the 2024 Charleston Open. It was both players' first WTA Tour doubles title, and they entered the tournament as wildcards.

Danielle Collins and Desirae Krawczyk were the reigning champions, but Collins chose not participate this year. Krawczyk partnered Caroline Dolehide, but lost in the first round to Eri Hozumi and Makoto Ninomiya.

== Seeds ==
1. (United States) Nicole Melichar-Martinez / (Australia) Ellen Perez (semifinals)
2. (United States) Caroline Dolehide / (United States) Desirae Krawczyk (first round)
3. (Japan) Miyu Kato / (Indonesia) Aldila Sutjiadi (first round)
4. (Kazakhstan) Anna Danilina / (Mexico) Giuliana Olmos (first round)

== Draw ==
=== Key ===
- Q = Qualifier
- WC = Wild card
- LL = Lucky loser
- Alt = Alternate
- SE = Special exempt
- PR = Protected ranking
- ITF = ITF entry
- JE = Junior exempt
- w/o = Walkover
- r = Retired
- d = Defaulted
- SR = Special ranking

=== Draw ===
First round
1	(United States) N Melichar-Martinez (Australia) E Perez	6	6
WC	(United States) M Kessler (United States) C Ngounoue	2	3
(Poland) M Linette (China) S Zhang	6	6
(Brazil) I Gamarra Martins (Slovakia) T Mihalíková	1	2
3	(Japan) M Kato (Indonesia) A Sutjiadi	1	6	[7]
(United States) M Keys (United States) T Townsend	6	2	[10]
(United States) S Chang (China) Y Xu	4	6	[8]
(Ukraine) L Kichenok (Ukraine) N Kichenok	6	1	[10]
WC	(United States) A Krueger (United States) S Stephens	6	6
(Norway) U Eikeri (Chinese Taipei) F-h Wu	3	2
(United Kingdom) O Nicholls (United Kingdom) H Watson	6	6
4	(Kazakhstan) A Danilina (Mexico) G Olmos	4	4
(Chinese Taipei) H-c Chan; V Kudermetova	6	6
E Alexandrova; Y Sizikova	3	4
(Japan) E Hozumi (Japan) M Ninomiya	5	6	[10]
2	(United States) C Dolehide (United States) D Krawczyk	7	4	[3]

Quarterfinals
1	(United States) N Melichar-Martinez (Australia) E Perez	6	6
(Poland) M Linette (China) S Zhang	2	0
(United States) M Keys (United States) T Townsend	6	1	[8]
(Ukraine) L Kichenok (Ukraine) N Kichenok	3	6	[10]
WC	(United States) A Krueger (United States) S Stephens	6^{5}	6	[10]
(United Kingdom) O Nicholls (United Kingdom) H Watson	7^{7}	2	[6]
(Chinese Taipei) H-c Chan; V Kudermetova	4	6	[5]
(Japan) E Hozumi (Japan) M Ninomiya	6	0	[10]

Semifinals
1	(United States) N Melichar-Martinez (Australia) E Perez	6^{4}	7^{7}	[11]
(Ukraine) L Kichenok (Ukraine) N Kichenok	7^{7}	6^{2}	[13]
WC	(United States) A Krueger (United States) S Stephens	5	6	[10]
(Japan) E Hozumi (Japan) M Ninomiya	7	0	[4]

Final
(Ukraine) L Kichenok (Ukraine) N Kichenok	6	3	[7]
WC	(United States) A Krueger (United States) S Stephens	1	6	[10]
