= 2024 Porsche Tennis Grand Prix – Doubles =

Doubles
- 2024 Porsche Tennis Grand Prix

Final
- Champions: (Chinese Taipei) Chan Hao-ching; Veronika Kudermetova
- Runners-up: (Norway) Ulrikke Eikeri (Estonia) Ingrid Neel
- Score: 4–6, 6–3, [10–2]

Details
- Draw: 16
- Seeds: 4

Events
Singles	Doubles
- Porsche Tennis Grand Prix

Chan Hao-ching and Veronika Kudermetova defeated Ulrikke Eikeri and Ingrid Neel in the final, 4–6, 6–3, [10–2] to win the doubles tennis title at the 2024 Porsche Tennis Grand Prix.

Desirae Krawczyk and Demi Schuurs were the two-time defending champions, but lost in the first round to Nastasja Schunk and Ella Seidel.

== Seeds ==
1. (United States) Desirae Krawczyk / (Netherlands) Demi Schuurs (first round)
2. (Czech Republic) Barbora Krejčíková / (Germany) Laura Siegemund (semifinals, withdrew)
3. (Japan) Shuko Aoyama / (Ukraine) Nadiia Kichenok (first round)
4. (United States) Asia Muhammad / (Indonesia) Aldila Sutjiadi (first round)

== Draw ==
Key

- Q = Qualifier
- WC = Wild card
- LL = Lucky loser
- Alt = Alternate
- ITF = ITF entry
- PR = Protected ranking
- SR = Special ranking
- SE = Special exempt
- JE = Junior exempt
- JR = Junior Accelerator Programme entrant
- CO = College Accelerator Programme entrant
- NG = Next Gen Accelerator Program entrant
- w/o = Walkover
- r = Retired
- d = Defaulted

=== Draw ===
First round
1	(United States) D Krawczyk (Netherlands) D Schuurs	4	6	[8]
WC	(Germany) N Schunk (Germany) E Seidel	6	4	[10]
(Chinese Taipei) H-c Chan; V Kudermetova	6	6
(Mexico) G Olmos; A Panova	2	2
3	(Japan) S Aoyama (Ukraine) N Kichenok	6	5	[5]
(Spain) P Badosa (Tunisia) O Jabeur	4	7	[10]
(United States) B Mattek-Sands (China) S Zhang	6	6
(China) H Guo (China) X Jiang	0	3
(Norway) U Eikeri (Estonia) I Neel	6	1	[10]
(Italy) S Errani (Italy) J Paolini	4	6	[6]
A Potapova; V Zvonareva	2	6	[10]
4	(United States) A Muhammad (Indonesia) A Sutjiadi	6	3	[8]
L Samsonova; D Shnaider	6	6
(Slovakia) T Mihalíková; Y Sizikova	3	2
(Chinese Taipei) F-h Wu (China) Y Xu	6	4	[7]
2	(Czech Republic) B Krejčíková (Germany) L Siegemund	3	6	[10]

Quarterfinals
WC	(Germany) N Schunk (Germany) E Seidel	1	2
(Chinese Taipei) H-c Chan; V Kudermetova	6	6
(Spain) P Badosa (Tunisia) O Jabeur
(United States) B Mattek-Sands (China) S Zhang	w/o
(Norway) U Eikeri (Estonia) I Neel	3	6	[10]
A Potapova; V Zvonareva	6	4	[3]
L Samsonova; D Shnaider	1	3
2	(Czech Republic) B Krejčíková (Germany) L Siegemund	6	6

Semifinals
(Chinese Taipei) H-c Chan; V Kudermetova	6	6
(United States) B Mattek-Sands (China) S Zhang	4	3
(Norway) U Eikeri (Estonia) I Neel	w/o
2	(Czech Republic) B Krejčíková (Germany) L Siegemund

Final
(Chinese Taipei) H-c Chan; V Kudermetova	4	6	[10]
(Norway) U Eikeri (Estonia) I Neel	6	3	[2]
