= 2024 San Diego Open – Singles =

Singles
- 2024 San Diego Open

Final
- Champion: (United Kingdom) Katie Boulter
- Runner-up: (Ukraine) Marta Kostyuk
- Score: 5–7, 6–2, 6–2

Details
- Draw: 28 (4WC, 6Q)
- Seeds: 8

Events
Singles	Doubles
- San Diego Open

Katie Boulter defeated Marta Kostyuk in the final, 5–7, 6–2, 6–2 to win the singles tennis title at the 2024 San Diego Open. It was her second WTA Tour title and first WTA 500 title.

Barbora Krejčíková was the reigning champion, but chose not to compete this year.

== Seeds ==
The top four seeds received a bye into the second round.

1. (United States) Jessica Pegula (semifinals)
2. (Brazil) Beatriz Haddad Maia (second round)
3. (United States) Emma Navarro (semifinals)
4. Anastasia Pavlyuchenkova (quarterfinals)
5. (Ukraine) Dayana Yastremska (second round)
6. (Ukraine) Marta Kostyuk (final)
7. (Croatia) Donna Vekić (quarterfinals)
8. (Canada) Leylah Fernandez (first round, retired)

== Draw ==
Key

- Q = Qualifier
- WC = Wild card
- LL = Lucky loser
- Alt = Alternate
- ITF = ITF entry
- PR = Protected ranking
- SR = Special ranking
- SE = Special exempt
- JE = Junior exempt
- JR = Junior Accelerator Programme entrant
- CO = College Accelerator Programme entrant
- NG = Next Gen Accelerator Program entrant
- w/o = Walkover
- r = Retired
- d = Defaulted

=== Finals ===
Semifinals
1	(United States) Jessica Pegula	6^{4}	1
6	(Ukraine) Marta Kostyuk	7^{7}	6
3	(United States) Emma Navarro	3	1
(United Kingdom) Katie Boulter	6	6

Final
6	(Ukraine) Marta Kostyuk	7	2	2
(United Kingdom) Katie Boulter	5	6	6

=== Top half ===
First round
Q	(Germany) J Niemeier	6	6
(France) V Gracheva	3	0
WC	(Denmark) C Wozniacki	6	4	1
A Blinkova	1	6	6
(United States) C Dolehide	4	7	1
5	(Ukraine) D Yastremska	6	5	6
(Denmark) C Tauson	2	6	1
(China) Xin Wang	6	2	6
WC	(Australia) T Preston	6	4	6
(Poland) M Fręch	4	6	1
Q	(United States) A Li	4	6	2
6	(Ukraine) M Kostyuk	6	4	6

Second round
1	(United States) J Pegula	6	6
Q	(Germany) J Niemeier	0	4
A Blinkova	7^{8}	6
5	(Ukraine) D Yastremska	6^{6}	2
4	A Pavlyuchenkova	4	7^{7}	6
(China) Xin Wang	6	6^{5}	2
WC	(Australia) T Preston	4	3
6	(Ukraine) M Kostyuk	6	6

Quarterfinals
1	(United States) J Pegula	6	2	6
A Blinkova	1	6	2
4	A Pavlyuchenkova	6	4	3
6	(Ukraine) M Kostyuk	3	6	6

Semifinals
1	(United States) J Pegula	6^{4}	1
6	(Ukraine) M Kostyuk	7^{7}	6

=== Bottom half ===
First round
8	(Canada) L Fernandez	7^{9}	0^{r}
(Germany) T Maria	6^{7}	4
Q	(Australia) D Saville	6	6
(China) L Zhu	3	3
Q	(Japan) M Hontama	3	1
(Czech Republic) K Siniaková	6	6
7	(Croatia) D Vekić	7	6
WC	(United States) K Hui	5	2
Q	M Melnikova	4	7	1
Q	(Canada) M Stakusic	6	5	6
(Ukraine) L Tsurenko	3	1
(United Kingdom) K Boulter	6	6

Second round
(Germany) T Maria	7	6^{2}	2
Q	(Australia) D Saville	5	7^{7}	6
(Czech Republic) K Siniaková	3	6	1
3	(United States) E Navarro	6	3	6
7	(Croatia) D Vekić	6	3	6
Q	(Canada) M Stakusic	4	6	3
(United Kingdom) K Boulter	3	6	6
2	(Brazil) B Haddad Maia	6	3	4

Quarterfinals
Q	(Australia) D Saville	4	2
3	(United States) E Navarro	6	6
7	(Croatia) D Vekić	4	3
(United Kingdom) K Boulter	6	6

Semifinals
3	(United States) E Navarro	3	1
(United Kingdom) K Boulter	6	6

== Qualifying ==
=== Seeds ===
1. (United Kingdom) Jodie Burrage (first round)
2. (United States) Kayla Day (qualifying competition)
3. Maria Timofeeva (first round, retired)
4. (United States) Claire Liu (qualifying competition)
5. (Japan) Mai Hontama (qualified)
6. (Czech Republic) Linda Fruhvirtová (qualifying competition)
7. (Germany) Jule Niemeier (qualified)
8. (Slovakia) Rebecca Šramková (qualifying competition)
9. (Hungary) Dalma Gálfi (qualifying competition)
10. (Australia) Daria Saville (qualified)
11. (France) Elsa Jacquemot (qualifying competition)
12. (United States) Ann Li (qualified)

=== Qualifiers ===
1. Marina Melnikova
2. (United States) Ann Li
3. (Canada) Marina Stakusic
4. (Germany) Jule Niemeier
5. (Japan) Mai Hontama
6. (Australia) Daria Saville

=== Qualifying draw ===
==== First qualifier ====
First round
1	(United Kingdom) Jodie Burrage	1	6^{2}
Marina Melnikova	6	7^{7}
Ekaterina Makarova	3	2
8	(Slovakia) Rebecca Šramková	6	6

Qualifying competition
Marina Melnikova	4	6	6
8	(Slovakia) Rebecca Šramková	6	2	4

==== Second qualifier ====
First round
2	(United States) Kayla Day	6	6
WC	(United States) Madison Sieg	3	3
WC	(United States) Alyssa Ahn	5	5
12	(United States) Ann Li	7	7

Qualifying competition
2	(United States) Kayla Day	3	0
12	(United States) Ann Li	6	6

==== Third qualifier ====
First round
3	Maria Timofeeva	2	0^{r}
WC	(Canada) Marina Stakusic	6	3
WC	(United States) Haley Giavara	3	2
11	(France) Elsa Jacquemot	6	6

Qualifying competition
WC	(Canada) Marina Stakusic	6	6
11	(France) Elsa Jacquemot	3	4

==== Fourth qualifier ====
First round
4	(United States) Claire Liu	6	6
(Canada) Stacey Fung	3	4
(Serbia) Natalija Stevanović	6^{5}	6	4
7	(Germany) Jule Niemeier	7^{7}	3	6

Qualifying competition
4	(United States) Claire Liu	4	2
7	(Germany) Jule Niemeier	6	6

==== Fifth qualifier ====
First round
5	(Japan) Mai Hontama	6	6
(Greece) Despina Papamichail	3	4
(Netherlands) Lesley Pattinama Kerkhove	3	5
9	(Hungary) Dalma Gálfi	6	7

Qualifying competition
5	(Japan) Mai Hontama	7^{7}	6
9	(Hungary) Dalma Gálfi	6^{4}	4

==== Sixth qualifier ====
First round
6	(Czech Republic) Linda Fruhvirtová	6	6
Jana Kolodynska	2	0
(United States) Hanna Chang	2	2
10	(Australia) Daria Saville	6	6

Qualifying competition
6	(Czech Republic) Linda Fruhvirtová	4	1
10	(Australia) Daria Saville	6	6
