= 2024 San Diego Open – Doubles =

Doubles
- 2024 San Diego Open

Final
- Champions: (United States) Nicole Melichar-Martinez (Australia) Ellen Perez
- Runners-up: (United States) Desirae Krawczyk (United States) Jessica Pegula
- Score: 6–1, 6–2

Details
- Draw: 16 (2WC)
- Seeds: 4

Events
Singles	Doubles
← 2023 ·	San Diego Open

Nicole Melichar-Martinez and Ellen Perez defeated Desirae Krawczyk and Jessica Pegula in the final, 6–1, 6–2 to win the doubles tennis title at the 2024 San Diego Open.

Barbora Krejčíková and Kateřina Siniaková were the reigning champions, but Krejčiková chose not to compete this year. Siniaková partnered Storm Hunter, but lost in the semifinals to Melichar-Martinez and Perez. Hunter was in contention to reclaim the WTA No. 1 doubles ranking if she had won the title.

== Seeds ==
1. (United States) Desirae Krawczyk / (United States) Jessica Pegula (final)
2. (Australia) Storm Hunter / (Czech Republic) Kateřina Siniaková (semifinals)
3. (United States) Nicole Melichar-Martinez / (Australia) Ellen Perez (champions)
4. (Chinese Taipei) Chan Hao-ching / (Mexico) Giuliana Olmos (quarterfinals)

== Draw ==
=== Key ===
- Q = Qualifier
- WC = Wild card
- LL = Lucky loser
- Alt = Alternate
- SE = Special exempt
- PR = Protected ranking
- ITF = ITF entry
- JE = Junior exempt
- w/o = Walkover
- r = Retired
- d = Defaulted
- SR = Special ranking

=== Draw ===
First round
1	(United States) D Krawczyk (United States) J Pegula	4	6	[10]
(Japan) S Aoyama (Chinese Taipei) F-h Wu	6	3	[2]
(Greece) D Papamichail (Ukraine) V Strakhova	6^{2}	7^{7}	[7]
(United States) K Day (United States) C Liu	7^{7}	6^{2}	[10]
4	(Chinese Taipei) H-c Chan (Mexico) G Olmos	6^{2}	6	[10]
A Blinkova (Australia) D Saville	7^{7}	4	[5]
(Norway) U Eikeri (China) H Guo	7	6
WC	(United States) E Deming (United States) A Li	5	2
(Italy) A Moratelli (Italy) C Rosatello	6	1	[7]
L Marozava (Belgium) K Zimmermann	1	6	[10]
Alt	(Hungary) D Gálfi (Japan) M Hontama	1	5
3	(United States) N Melichar-Martinez (Australia) E Perez	6	7
(China) Xin Wang (China) Y Xu	1	2
(Japan) E Hozumi (Japan) M Ninomiya	6	6
(Czech Republic) M Kolodziejová (Poland) K Piter	5	1
2	(Australia) S Hunter (Czech Republic) K Siniaková	7	6

Quarterfinals
1	(United States) D Krawczyk (United States) J Pegula	6	3	[10]
(United States) K Day (United States) C Liu	3	6	[7]
4	(Chinese Taipei) H-c Chan (Mexico) G Olmos	1	6	[5]
(Norway) U Eikeri (China) H Guo	6	2	[10]
L Marozava (Belgium) K Zimmermann	2	1
3	(United States) N Melichar-Martinez (Australia) E Perez	6	6
(Japan) E Hozumi (Japan) M Ninomiya	4	2
2	(Australia) S Hunter (Czech Republic) K Siniaková	6	6

Semifinals
1	(United States) D Krawczyk (United States) J Pegula	6	6
(Norway) U Eikeri (China) H Guo	1	1
3	(United States) N Melichar-Martinez (Australia) E Perez	5	6	[11]
2	(Australia) S Hunter (Czech Republic) K Siniaková	7	4	[9]

Final
1	(United States) D Krawczyk (United States) J Pegula	1	2
3	(United States) N Melichar-Martinez (Australia) E Perez	6	6
