= 2024 Iga Świątek tennis season =

2024 tennis player season

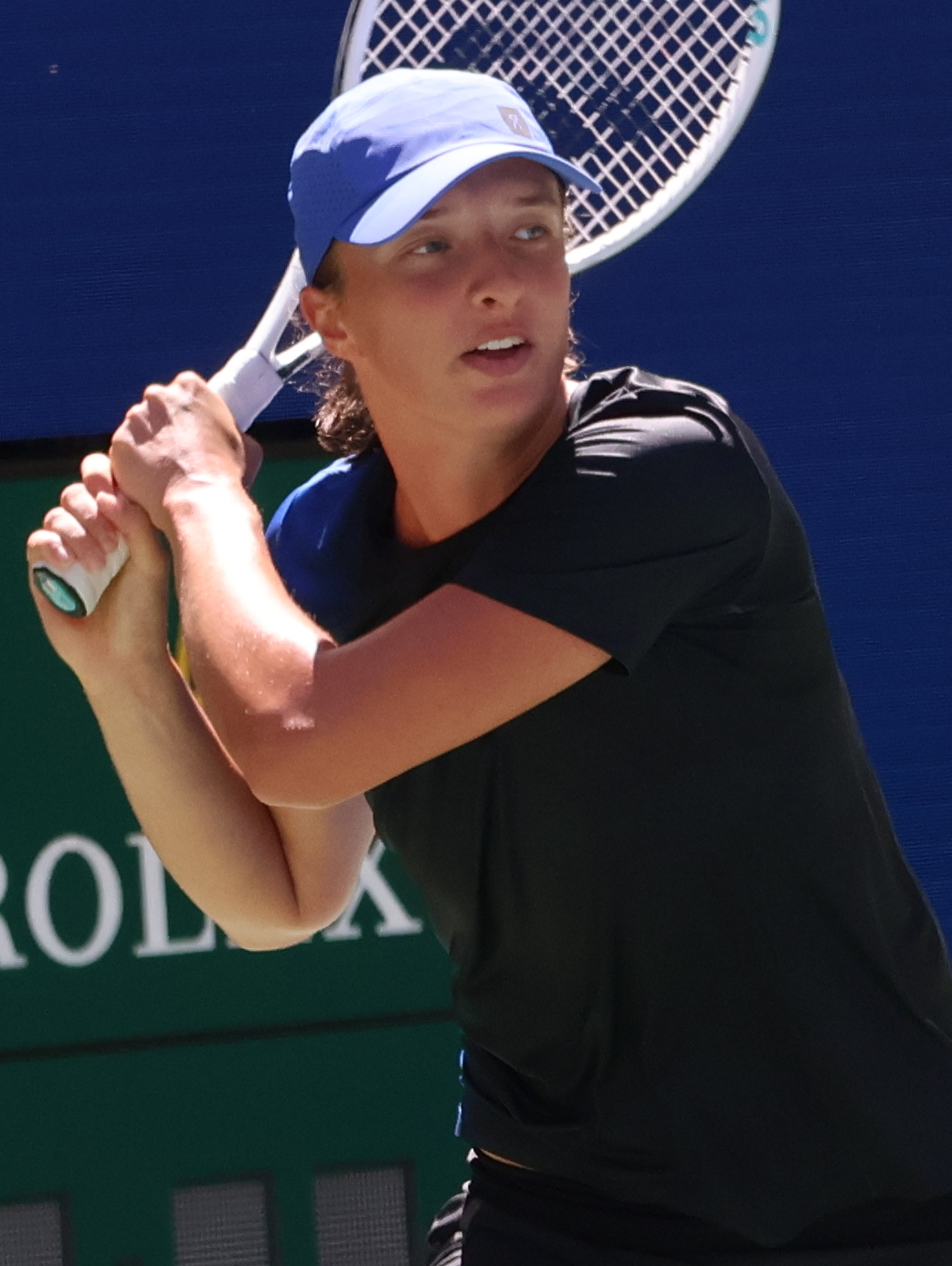
- Swiatek practicing at the 2023 US Open
- Full name: Iga Świątek
- Country: Poland
- Calendar prize money: $8,540,693

Singles
- Season record: 64–9 (88%)
- Calendar titles: 5
- Year-end ranking: No. 2
- Ranking change from previous year: ▼1

Grand Slam & significant results
- Australian Open: 3R
- French Open: W
- Wimbledon: 3R
- US Open: QF
- Championships: RR
- Olympic Games: Bronze medal

Doubles
- Season record: 1–1

Mixed doubles
- Season record: 2–1

Billie Jean King Cup
- BJK Cup: SF
- Last updated on: 19 November 2024.

The 2024 Iga Świątek tennis season officially began on 30 December 2023 as the start of the 2024 WTA Tour. Iga Świątek entered the season as the world No. 1 player in singles for the second year in a row in her career. She finished the season as the year-end ITF World Champion and ranked No. 2 by the WTA.

== Yearly summary ==
=== Early hard court season ===
Świątek represented Team Poland in the United Cup. Poland was drawn into Group A along with Team Spain and Team Brazil. Świątek won both of her group stage singles matches by defeating Beatriz Haddad Maia and Sara Sorribes Tormo. She also won both of her mixed doubles matches alongside Hubert Hurkacz, including a win against the Spanish team without dropping a single game. She then went on to defeat Zheng Qinwen and Caroline Garcia in the quarterfinals and the semifinals of the event, respectively. Despite giving Poland a lead after winning her singles match against Germany's Angelique Kerber, she and Hurkacz lost their mixed doubles match to the pair of Laura Siegemund and Alexander Zverev, therefore losing the United Cup final.

Świątek entered the Australian Open as the No. 1 seeded player, her 8th consecutive major as the top seed. She recorded wins against the 2020 champion, Sofia Kenin and runner up of 2022 edition, Danielle Collins in the first and second round, respectively. In the third round, she was upset by Linda Nosková in three sets and as a result of this loss her 18 match winning streak came to an end which started in September 2023. This marked the earliest loss by a top seed at the Australian Open since 1979, and the first time that the top seed failed to make the round of 16 since the tournament became a 128-player draw in 1988.

In February, Świątek entered the Qatar Open as a two-time defending champion. She reached the final after having defeated Sorana Cîrstea, Ekaterina Alexandrova and Viktoria Azarenka. In the final, she faced Elena Rybakina winning in straight sets and claiming her 7th WTA 1000 title. Świątek did not drop a set en route to the title for the second consecutive year. She also became the first person to win three consecutive titles in Doha and the first player to win three consecutive titles at the same hardcourt tournament since Serena Williams in 2015.

In March, Świątek won the BNP Paribas Open in Indian Wells for the second time, defeating Maria Sakkari in the final. This was her second title of the season and 19th overall. In Miami, she recorded her 100th WTA 1000 career match win defeating Camila Giorgi in one hour, in straight sets.

=== Clay season ===
In April, Świątek entered the Stuttgart Open as a two-time defending champion and reached the semifinal where she lost to Elena Rybakina in three sets, which ended her 10-match winning streak in the tournament. In the same month, she entered her 100th week as the reigning world No. 1 surpassing Lindsay Davenport and moving to the ninth place in the all-time table. At the Madrid Open, she reached the final where she faced the defending champion and 2nd seed Aryna Sabalenka. Świątek played the longest match against Sabalenka in her career thus far, which lasted over three hours. She defended three championship points in the third set and won her 20th career title, becoming the joint-most successful Polish tennis player in terms of the number of titles won alongside Agnieszka Radwańska. At the next WTA 1000, the Italian Open, she reached a second consecutive final with a win over world No. 3 Coco Gauff in straight sets.

=== Suspension ===
Świątek received a one-month suspension in November 2024 following a positive test for banned substance trimetazidine. The drug was found to be a contaminant in a sleep medication melatonin she was taking, so she was handed a penalty that was at the lowest end of the range for "No Significant Fault or Negligence". Nevertheless she had to miss three tournaments while her case was being considered and forfeit her prize money from the Cincinnati Open.

== All matches ==
Key
W	F	SF	QF	#R	RR	Q#	P#	DNQ	A	Z#	PO	G	S	B	NMS	NTI	P	NH

(W) winner; (F) finalist; (SF) semifinalist; (QF) quarterfinalist; (#R) rounds 4, 3, 2, 1; (RR) round-robin stage; (Q#) qualification round; (P#) preliminary round; (DNQ) did not qualify; (A) absent; (Z#) Davis/Fed Cup Zonal Group (with number indication) or (PO) play-off; (G) gold, (S) silver or (B) bronze Olympic/Paralympic medal; (NMS) not a Masters tournament; (NTI) not a Tier I tournament; (P) postponed; (NH) not held; (SR) strike rate (events won / competed); (W–L) win–loss record.
To avoid confusion and double counting, these charts are updated at the conclusion of a tournament or when the player's participation has ended.

=== Singles matches ===
Tournament	Match	Round	Opponent	Rank	Result	Score
United Cup; Perth/Sydney, Australia; United Cup; Hard, outdoor; 29 December 2023 – 7 January 2024	1	RR	(Brazil) Beatriz Haddad Maia	11	Win	6–2, 6–2
United Cup; Perth/Sydney, Australia; United Cup; Hard, outdoor; 29 December 2023 – 7 January 2024	2	RR	(Spain) Sara Sorribes Tormo	48	Win	6–2, 6–1
United Cup; Perth/Sydney, Australia; United Cup; Hard, outdoor; 29 December 2023 – 7 January 2024	3	QF	(China) Zheng Qinwen	14	Win	6–2, 6–3
United Cup; Perth/Sydney, Australia; United Cup; Hard, outdoor; 29 December 2023 – 7 January 2024	4	SF	(France) Caroline Garcia	20	Win	4–6, 6–1, 6–1
United Cup; Perth/Sydney, Australia; United Cup; Hard, outdoor; 29 December 2023 – 7 January 2024	5	F	(Germany) Angelique Kerber	—N/a	Win	6–3, 6–0
Australian Open; Melbourne, Australia; Grand Slam; Hard, outdoor; 14 January 2024 – 28 January 2024	6	1R	(United States) Sofia Kenin	38	Win	7–6^{(7–2)}, 6–2
Australian Open; Melbourne, Australia; Grand Slam; Hard, outdoor; 14 January 2024 – 28 January 2024	7	2R	(United States) Danielle Collins	62	Win	6–4, 3–6, 6–4
Australian Open; Melbourne, Australia; Grand Slam; Hard, outdoor; 14 January 2024 – 28 January 2024	8	3R	(Czech Republic) Linda Nosková	50	Loss	6–3, 3–6, 4–6
Qatar Open; Doha, Qatar; WTA 1000; Hard, outdoor; 11 February 2024 – 17 February 2024	–	1R	Bye			
Qatar Open; Doha, Qatar; WTA 1000; Hard, outdoor; 11 February 2024 – 17 February 2024	9	2R	(Romania) Sorana Cîrstea	22	Win	6–1, 6–1
Qatar Open; Doha, Qatar; WTA 1000; Hard, outdoor; 11 February 2024 – 17 February 2024	10	3R	Ekaterina Alexandrova (Note: Russian and Belarus players are not allowed to compete under the name or flag of their country following the Russian invasion of Ukraine.) (14)	19	Win	6–1, 6–4
Qatar Open; Doha, Qatar; WTA 1000; Hard, outdoor; 11 February 2024 – 17 February 2024	11	QF	Victoria Azarenka	31	Win	6–4, 6–0
Qatar Open; Doha, Qatar; WTA 1000; Hard, outdoor; 11 February 2024 – 17 February 2024	–	SF	(Czech Republic) Karolína Plíšková	59	Walkover	—N/a
Qatar Open; Doha, Qatar; WTA 1000; Hard, outdoor; 11 February 2024 – 17 February 2024	12	W	(Kazakhstan) Elena Rybakina (3)	4	Win (1)	7–6^{(10–8)}, 6–2
Dubai Tennis Championships; Dubai, United Arab Emirates; WTA 1000; Hard, outdoor; 18 February 2024 – 24 February 2024	–	1R	Bye			
Dubai Tennis Championships; Dubai, United Arab Emirates; WTA 1000; Hard, outdoor; 18 February 2024 – 24 February 2024	13	2R	(United States) Sloane Stephens	39	Win	6–4, 6–4
Dubai Tennis Championships; Dubai, United Arab Emirates; WTA 1000; Hard, outdoor; 18 February 2024 – 24 February 2024	14	3R	(Ukraine) Elina Svitolina (15)	20	Win	6–1, 6–4
Dubai Tennis Championships; Dubai, United Arab Emirates; WTA 1000; Hard, outdoor; 18 February 2024 – 24 February 2024	15	QF	(China) Zheng Qinwen (6)	7	Win	6–3, 6–2
Dubai Tennis Championships; Dubai, United Arab Emirates; WTA 1000; Hard, outdoor; 18 February 2024 – 24 February 2024	16	SF	Anna Kalinskaya (Q)	40	Loss	4–6, 4–6
Indian Wells Open; Indian Wells, United States; WTA 1000; Hard, outdoor; 6 March 2024 – 17 March 2024	–	1R	Bye			
Indian Wells Open; Indian Wells, United States; WTA 1000; Hard, outdoor; 6 March 2024 – 17 March 2024	17	2R	(United States) Danielle Collins	56	Win	6–3, 6–0
Indian Wells Open; Indian Wells, United States; WTA 1000; Hard, outdoor; 6 March 2024 – 17 March 2024	18	3R	(Czech Republic) Linda Nosková (26)	29	Win	6–4, 6–0
Indian Wells Open; Indian Wells, United States; WTA 1000; Hard, outdoor; 6 March 2024 – 17 March 2024	19	4R	(Kazakhstan) Yulia Putintseva	79	Win	6–1, 6–2
Indian Wells Open; Indian Wells, United States; WTA 1000; Hard, outdoor; 6 March 2024 – 17 March 2024	20	QF	(Denmark) Caroline Wozniacki (WC)	204	Win	6–4, 1–0 ret.
Indian Wells Open; Indian Wells, United States; WTA 1000; Hard, outdoor; 6 March 2024 – 17 March 2024	21	SF	(Ukraine) Marta Kostyuk (31)	32	Win	6–2, 6–1
Indian Wells Open; Indian Wells, United States; WTA 1000; Hard, outdoor; 6 March 2024 – 17 March 2024	22	W	(Greece) Maria Sakkari (9)	9	Win (2)	6–4, 6–0
Miami Open; Miami Gardens, United States; WTA 1000; Hard, outdoor; 19 March 2024 – 31 March 2024	–	1R	Bye			
Miami Open; Miami Gardens, United States; WTA 1000; Hard, outdoor; 19 March 2024 – 31 March 2024	23	2R	(Italy) Camila Giorgi	107	Win	6–1, 6–1
Miami Open; Miami Gardens, United States; WTA 1000; Hard, outdoor; 19 March 2024 – 31 March 2024	24	3R	(Czech Republic) Linda Nosková (26)	31	Win	6–7^{(7–9)}, 6–4, 6–4
Miami Open; Miami Gardens, United States; WTA 1000; Hard, outdoor; 19 March 2024 – 31 March 2024	25	4R	Ekaterina Alexandrova (14)	16	Loss	4–6, 2–6
Billie Jean King Cup qualifying round; Poland vs. Switzerland; Biel/Bienne, Switzerland; Billie Jean King Cup; Hard, indoor; 12 April 2024 – 13 April 2024	26	Q	(Switzerland) Simona Waltert	158	Win	6–3, 6–1
Billie Jean King Cup qualifying round; Poland vs. Switzerland; Biel/Bienne, Switzerland; Billie Jean King Cup; Hard, indoor; 12 April 2024 – 13 April 2024	27	Q	(Switzerland) Céline Naef	148	Win	6–4, 6–3
Stuttgart Open; Stuttgart, Germany; WTA 500; Clay, indoor; 15 April 2024 – 21 April 2024	–	1R	Bye			
Stuttgart Open; Stuttgart, Germany; WTA 500; Clay, indoor; 15 April 2024 – 21 April 2024	28	2R	(Belgium) Elise Mertens	30	Win	6–3, 6–4
Stuttgart Open; Stuttgart, Germany; WTA 500; Clay, indoor; 15 April 2024 – 21 April 2024	29	QF	(United Kingdom) Emma Raducanu (WC)	303	Win	7–6^{(7–2)}, 6–3
Stuttgart Open; Stuttgart, Germany; WTA 500; Clay, indoor; 15 April 2024 – 21 April 2024	30	SF	(Kazakhstan) Elena Rybakina (4)	4	Loss	3–6, 6–4, 3–6
Madrid Open; Madrid, Spain; WTA 1000; Clay, outdoor; 23 April 2024 – 5 May 2024	–	1R	Bye			
Madrid Open; Madrid, Spain; WTA 1000; Clay, outdoor; 23 April 2024 – 5 May 2024	31	2R	(China) Wang Xiyu	52	Win	6–1, 6–4
Madrid Open; Madrid, Spain; WTA 1000; Clay, outdoor; 23 April 2024 – 5 May 2024	32	3R	(Romania) Sorana Cîrstea (27)	30	Win	6–1, 6–1
Madrid Open; Madrid, Spain; WTA 1000; Clay, outdoor; 23 April 2024 – 5 May 2024	33	4R	(Spain) Sara Sorribes Tormo	55	Win	6–1, 6–0
Madrid Open; Madrid, Spain; WTA 1000; Clay, outdoor; 23 April 2024 – 5 May 2024	34	QF	(Brazil) Beatriz Haddad Maia (11)	13	Win	4–6, 6–0, 6–2
Madrid Open; Madrid, Spain; WTA 1000; Clay, outdoor; 23 April 2024 – 5 May 2024	35	SF	(United States) Madison Keys (18)	20	Win	6–1, 6–3
Madrid Open; Madrid, Spain; WTA 1000; Clay, outdoor; 23 April 2024 – 5 May 2024	36	W	Aryna Sabalenka (2)	2	Win (3)	7–5, 4–6, 7–6^{(9–7)}
Italian Open; Rome, Italy; WTA 1000; Clay, outdoor; 8 May 2024 – 19 May 2024	–	1R	Bye			
Italian Open; Rome, Italy; WTA 1000; Clay, outdoor; 8 May 2024 – 19 May 2024	37	2R	(United States) Bernarda Pera (Q)	77	Win	6–0, 6–2
Italian Open; Rome, Italy; WTA 1000; Clay, outdoor; 8 May 2024 – 19 May 2024	38	3R	(Kazakhstan) Yulia Putintseva	41	Win	6–3, 6–4
Italian Open; Rome, Italy; WTA 1000; Clay, outdoor; 8 May 2024 – 19 May 2024	39	4R	(Germany) Angelique Kerber (PR)	331	Win	7–5, 6–3
Italian Open; Rome, Italy; WTA 1000; Clay, outdoor; 8 May 2024 – 19 May 2024	40	QF	(United States) Madison Keys (18)	16	Win	6–1, 6–3
Italian Open; Rome, Italy; WTA 1000; Clay, outdoor; 8 May 2024 – 19 May 2024	41	SF	(United States) Coco Gauff (3)	3	Win	6–4, 6–3
Italian Open; Rome, Italy; WTA 1000; Clay, outdoor; 8 May 2024 – 19 May 2024	42	W	Aryna Sabalenka (2)	2	Win (4)	6–2, 6–3
French Open; Paris, France; Grand Slam; Clay, outdoor; 20 May 2024 – 9 June 2024	43	1R	(France) Léolia Jeanjean (Q)	143	Win	6–1, 6–2
French Open; Paris, France; Grand Slam; Clay, outdoor; 20 May 2024 – 9 June 2024	44	2R	(Japan) Naomi Osaka (PR)	134	Win	7–6^{(7–1)}, 1–6, 7–5
French Open; Paris, France; Grand Slam; Clay, outdoor; 20 May 2024 – 9 June 2024	45	3R	(Czech Republic) Marie Bouzková	42	Win	6–4, 6–2
French Open; Paris, France; Grand Slam; Clay, outdoor; 20 May 2024 – 9 June 2024	46	4R	Anastasia Potapova	41	Win	6–0, 6–0
French Open; Paris, France; Grand Slam; Clay, outdoor; 20 May 2024 – 9 June 2024	47	QF	(Czech Republic) Markéta Vondroušová (5)	6	Win	6–0, 6–2
French Open; Paris, France; Grand Slam; Clay, outdoor; 20 May 2024 – 9 June 2024	48	SF	(United States) Coco Gauff (3)	3	Win	6–2, 6–4
French Open; Paris, France; Grand Slam; Clay, outdoor; 20 May 2024 – 9 June 2024	49	W	(Italy) Jasmine Paolini (12)	15	Win (5)	6–2, 6–1
Wimbledon; London, United Kingdom; Grand Slam; Grass, outdoor; 1 July 2024 – 14 July 2024	50	1R	(United States) Sofia Kenin	49	Win	6–3, 6–4
Wimbledon; London, United Kingdom; Grand Slam; Grass, outdoor; 1 July 2024 – 14 July 2024	51	2R	(Croatia) Petra Martić	85	Win	6–4, 6–3
Wimbledon; London, United Kingdom; Grand Slam; Grass, outdoor; 1 July 2024 – 14 July 2024	52	3R	(Kazakhstan) Yulia Putintseva	35	Loss	6–3, 1–6, 2–6
Summer Olympics; Paris, France; Olympic Games; Clay, outdoor; 27 July 2024 – 4 August 2024	53	1R	(Romania) Irina-Camelia Begu (PR)	143	Win	6–2, 7–5
Summer Olympics; Paris, France; Olympic Games; Clay, outdoor; 27 July 2024 – 4 August 2024	54	2R	(France) Diane Parry	59	Win	6–1, 6–1
Summer Olympics; Paris, France; Olympic Games; Clay, outdoor; 27 July 2024 – 4 August 2024	55	3R	(China) Wang Xiyu	52	Win	6–3, 6–4
Summer Olympics; Paris, France; Olympic Games; Clay, outdoor; 27 July 2024 – 4 August 2024	56	QF	(United States) Danielle Collins (8)	9	Win	6–1, 2–6, 4–1 ret.
Summer Olympics; Paris, France; Olympic Games; Clay, outdoor; 27 July 2024 – 4 August 2024	57	SF	(China) Zheng Qinwen (6)	7	Loss	2–6, 5–7
Summer Olympics; Paris, France; Olympic Games; Clay, outdoor; 27 July 2024 – 4 August 2024	58	B	(Slovakia) Anna Karolína Schmiedlová	67	Win	6–2, 6–1
Cincinnati Open; Mason, United States; WTA 1000; Hard, outdoor; 13 August 2024 – 19 August 2024	–	1R	Bye			
Cincinnati Open; Mason, United States; WTA 1000; Hard, outdoor; 13 August 2024 – 19 August 2024	59	2R	(France) Varvara Gracheva (Q)	69	Win	6–0, 6–7^{(8–10)}, 6–2
Cincinnati Open; Mason, United States; WTA 1000; Hard, outdoor; 13 August 2024 – 19 August 2024	60	3R	(Ukraine) Marta Kostyuk (15)	21	Win	6–2, 6–2
Cincinnati Open; Mason, United States; WTA 1000; Hard, outdoor; 13 August 2024 – 19 August 2024	61	QF	Mirra Andreeva	24	Win	4–6, 6–3, 7–5
Cincinnati Open; Mason, United States; WTA 1000; Hard, outdoor; 13 August 2024 – 19 August 2024	62	SF	Aryna Sabalenka (3)	3	Loss	3–6, 3–6
US Open; New York City, United States; Grand Slam; Hard, outdoor; 26 August 2024 – 8 September 2024	63	1R	Kamilla Rakhimova (LL)	104	Win	6–4, 7–6^{(8–6)}
US Open; New York City, United States; Grand Slam; Hard, outdoor; 26 August 2024 – 8 September 2024	64	2R	(Japan) Ena Shibahara (Q)	217	Win	6–0, 6–1
US Open; New York City, United States; Grand Slam; Hard, outdoor; 26 August 2024 – 8 September 2024	65	3R	Anastasia Pavlyuchenkova (25)	27	Win	6–4, 6–2
US Open; New York City, United States; Grand Slam; Hard, outdoor; 26 August 2024 – 8 September 2024	66	4R	Liudmila Samsonova (16)	16	Win	6–4, 6–1
US Open; New York City, United States; Grand Slam; Hard, outdoor; 26 August 2024 – 8 September 2024	67	QF	(United States) Jessica Pegula (6)	6	Loss	2–6, 4–6
WTA Finals; Riyadh, Saudi Arabia; Year-end championships; Hard, indoor; 2 November 2024 – 9 November 2024	68	RR	(Czech Republic) Barbora Krejčíková (8)	13	Win	4–6, 7–5, 6–2
WTA Finals; Riyadh, Saudi Arabia; Year-end championships; Hard, indoor; 2 November 2024 – 9 November 2024	69	RR	(United States) Coco Gauff (3)	3	Loss	3–6, 4–6
WTA Finals; Riyadh, Saudi Arabia; Year-end championships; Hard, indoor; 2 November 2024 – 9 November 2024	70	RR	Daria Kasatkina (9)	9	Win	6–1, 6–0
Billie Jean King Cup finals; Málaga, Spain; Billie Jean King Cup; Hard, indoor; 14 November 2024 – 20 November 2024	71	1R	(Spain) Paula Badosa	12	Win	6–3, 6–7^{(5–7)}, 6–1
Billie Jean King Cup finals; Málaga, Spain; Billie Jean King Cup; Hard, indoor; 14 November 2024 – 20 November 2024	72	QF	(Czech Republic) Linda Nosková	26	Win	7–6^{(7–4)}, 4–6, 7–5
Billie Jean King Cup finals; Málaga, Spain; Billie Jean King Cup; Hard, indoor; 14 November 2024 – 20 November 2024	73	SF	(Italy) Jasmine Paolini	4	Win	3–6, 6–4, 6–4

=== Doubles matches ===
Tournament	Match	Round	Opponent	Rank	Result	Score
Billie Jean King Cup finals; Málaga, Spain; Billie Jean King Cup; Hard, indoor; 14 November 2024 – 20 November 2024; Partner: (Poland) Katarzyna Kawa	1	QF	(Czech Republic) Marie Bouzková / (Czech Republic) Kateřina Siniaková	49 / 1	Win	6–2, 6–4
Billie Jean King Cup finals; Málaga, Spain; Billie Jean King Cup; Hard, indoor; 14 November 2024 – 20 November 2024; Partner: (Poland) Katarzyna Kawa	2	SF	(Italy) Sara Errani / (Italy) Jasmine Paolini	8 / 10	Loss	5–7, 5–7

=== Mixed doubles matches ===
Tournament	Match	Round	Opponent	Combined Rank	Result	Score
United Cup; Perth/Sydney, Australia; United Cup; Hard, outdoor; 29 December 2023 – 7 January 2024; Partner: (Poland) Hubert Hurkacz	1	RR	(Brazil) Beatriz Haddad Maia / (Brazil) Marcelo Melo	51	Win	6–4, 6–3
United Cup; Perth/Sydney, Australia; United Cup; Hard, outdoor; 29 December 2023 – 7 January 2024; Partner: (Poland) Hubert Hurkacz	2	RR	(Spain) Alejandro Davidovich Fokina / (Spain) Sara Sorribes Tormo	74	Win	6–0, 6–0
United Cup; Perth/Sydney, Australia; United Cup; Hard, outdoor; 29 December 2023 – 7 January 2024; Partner: (Poland) Hubert Hurkacz	3	QF	(China) Zhang Zhizhen / (China) Zheng Qinwen	72	Withdrew	—N/a
United Cup; Perth/Sydney, Australia; United Cup; Hard, outdoor; 29 December 2023 – 7 January 2024; Partner: (Poland) Hubert Hurkacz	4	SF	(France) Caroline Garcia / (France) Édouard Roger-Vasselin	31	Withdrew	—N/a
United Cup; Perth/Sydney, Australia; United Cup; Hard, outdoor; 29 December 2023 – 7 January 2024; Partner: (Poland) Hubert Hurkacz	5	F	(Germany) Laura Siegemund / (Germany) Alexander Zverev	12	Loss	4–6, 7–5, [4–10]

== Tournament schedule ==
Key
W	F	SF	QF	#R	RR

(W) winner; (F) finalist; (SF) semifinalist; (QF) quarterfinalist; (#R) rounds 4, 3, 2, 1; (RR) round-robin stage.

=== Singles schedule ===
Date	Tournament	Location	Tier	Surface	Prev. result	Prev. points	New points	Result
29 December 2023 – 7 January 2024	United Cup	Australia	United Cup	Hard	SF	125	500	Final defeated (Germany) Angelique Kerber; 6–3, 6–0
14 January 2024 – 27 January 2024	Australian Open	Australia	Grand Slam	Hard	4R	240	130	Third round lost to (Czech Republic) Linda Nosková; 6–3, 3–6, 4–6
11 February 2024 – 17 February 2024	Qatar Open	Qatar	WTA 1000	Hard	W	470	1000	Winner defeated (Kazakhstan) Elena Rybakina; 7–6^{(10–8)}, 6–2
18 February 2024 – 24 February 2024	Dubai Tennis Championships	United Arab Emirates	WTA 1000	Hard	F	585	390	Semifinals lost to Anna Kalinskaya; 4–6, 4–6
6 March 2024 – 17 March 2024	Indian Wells Open	United States	WTA 1000	Hard	SF	390	1000	Winner defeated (Greece) Maria Sakkari; 6–4, 6–0
20 March 2024 – 31 March 2024	Miami Open	United States	WTA 1000	Hard	A	0	120	Fourth round lost to Ekaterina Alexandrova; 4–6, 2–6
15 April 2024 – 21 April 2024	Stuttgart Open	Germany	WTA 500	Clay (i)	W	470	195	Semifinals lost to (Kazakhstan) Elena Rybakina; 3–6, 6–4, 3–6
23 April 2024 – 5 May 2024	Madrid Open	Spain	WTA 1000	Clay	F	650	1000	Winner defeated Aryna Sabalenka; 7–5, 4–6, 7–6^{(9–7)}
8 May 2024 – 19 May 2024	Italian Open	Italy	WTA 1000	Clay	QF	215	1000	Winner defeated Aryna Sabalenka; 6–2, 6–3
26 May 2024 – 9 June 2024	French Open	France	Grand Slam	Clay	W	2000	2000	Winner defeated (Italy) Jasmine Paolini; 6–2, 6–1
1 July 2024 – 14 July 2024	Wimbledon Championships	United Kingdom	Grand Slam	Grass	QF	430	130	Third round lost to (Kazakhstan) Yulia Putintseva; 6–3, 1–6, 2–6
27 July 2024 – 4 August 2024	Summer Olympics	France	Olympics	Clay	2R	—	—	Bronze medalist defeated (Slovakia) Anna Karolína Schmiedlová; 6–2, 6–1
13 August 2024 – 19 August 2024	Cincinnati Open	United States	WTA 1000	Hard	SF	390	—	Semifinals lost to Aryna Sabalenka; 3–6, 3–6
26 August 2024 – 8 September 2024	US Open	United States	Grand Slam	Hard	4R	240	430	Quarterfinals lost to (United States) Jessica Pegula; 2–6, 4–6
2 November 2024 – 9 November 2024	WTA Finals	Saudi Arabia	WTA Finals	Hard	W	1500	400	Eliminated in Group Stage; 2 wins & 1 loss
Total year-end points							8295	

=== Mixed doubles schedule ===
Date	Tournament	Location	Tier	Surface	Prev. result	Result
29 December 2023 – 7 January 2024	United Cup	Australia	United Cup	Hard	SF	Final lost to (Germany) Laura Siegemund / (Germany) Alexander Zverev; 4–6, 7–5, [4–10]

== Yearly records ==
=== Head-to-head match-ups ===
Świątek has a 64–9 (88%) WTA match win–loss record in the 2024 season. Her record against players who were part of the WTA rankings top ten at the time of their meetings is 11–5 (69%). Bold indicates player was ranked top 10 at the time of at least one meeting. The following list is ordered by number of wins:

- (United States) Danielle Collins 3–0
- (Czech Republic) Linda Nosková 3–1
- (Romania) Sorana Cîrstea 2–0
- (Spain) Sara Sorribes Tormo 2–0
- (Brazil) Beatriz Haddad Maia 2–0
- (Germany) Angelique Kerber 2–0
- (United States) Madison Keys 2–0
- (United States) Sofia Kenin 2–0
- (China) Wang Xiyu 2–0
- (Ukraine) Marta Kostyuk 2–0
- (Italy) **Jasmine Paolini** 2–0
- **Aryna Sabalenka** 2–1
- (China) **Zheng Qinwen** 2–1
- (Kazakhstan) Yulia Putintseva 2–1
- (United States) **Coco Gauff** 2–1
- (France) Caroline Garcia 1–0
- Victoria Azarenka 1–0
- (United States) Sloane Stephens 1–0
- (Ukraine) Elina Svitolina 1–0
- (Denmark) Caroline Wozniacki 1–0
- (Greece) **Maria Sakkari** 1–0
- (Italy) Camila Giorgi 1–0
- (Switzerland) Simona Waltert 1–0
- (Switzerland) Céline Naef 1–0
- (Belgium) Elise Mertens 1–0
- (United Kingdom) Emma Raducanu 1–0
- (United States) Bernarda Pera 1–0
- (France) Léolia Jeanjean 1–0
- (Japan) Naomi Osaka 1–0
- (Czech Republic) Marie Bouzková 1–0
- Anastasia Potapova 1–0
- (Czech Republic) **Markéta Vondroušová** 1–0
- (France) Diane Parry 1–0
- (Slovakia) Anna Karolína Schmiedlová 1–0
- (Croatia) Petra Martić 1–0
- (Romania) Irina-Camelia Begu 1–0
- (France) Varvara Gracheva 1–0
- Mirra Andreeva 1–0
- Kamilla Rakhimova 1–0
- (Japan) Ena Shibahara 1–0
- Anastasia Pavlyuchenkova 1–0
- Liudmila Samsonova 1–0
- (Czech Republic) Barbora Krejčíková 1–0
- **Daria Kasatkina** 1–0
- (Spain) Paula Badosa 1–0
- Ekaterina Alexandrova 1–1
- (Kazakhstan) **Elena Rybakina** 1–1
- Anna Kalinskaya 0–1
- (United States) **Jessica Pegula** 0–1

=== Top 10 record ===
- Key: (Rk) first use, opponent rank; (Rd) round; (Rk) 2nd use, player rank; (Ref) reference; (F) final; (SF) semifinal; (QF) quarterfinal; (#R) rounds 4, 3, 2, 1; (RR) round-robin stage; (Q#) qualifying rounds or stages (3), 2, 1.

==== Singles ====
Result	W–L	Opponent	Rk	Tournament	Surface	Rd	Score	Rk	Ref
Win	1–0	(Kazakhstan) Elena Rybakina	4	Qatar Open, Qatar	Hard	F	7–6^{(10–8)}, 6–2	1	
Win	2–0	(China) Zheng Qinwen	7	Dubai Championships, United Arab Emirates	Hard	QF	6–3, 6–2	1	
Win	3–0	(Greece) Maria Sakkari	9	Indian Wells Open, United States	Hard	F	6–4, 6–0	1	
Loss	3–1	(Kazakhstan) Elena Rybakina	4	Stuttgart Open, Germany	Clay (i)	SF	3–6, 6–4, 3–6	1	
Win	4–1	Aryna Sabalenka	2	Madrid Open, Spain	Clay	F	7–5, 4–6, 7–6^{(9–7)}	1	
Win	5–1	(United States) Coco Gauff	3	Italian Open, Italy	Clay	SF	6–4, 6–3	1	
Win	6–1	Aryna Sabalenka	2	Italian Open, Italy	Clay	F	6–2, 6–3	1	
Win	7–1	(Czech Republic) Markéta Vondroušová	6	French Open, France	Clay	QF	6–0, 6–2	1	
Win	8–1	(United States) Coco Gauff	3	French Open, France	Clay	SF	6–2, 6–4	1	
Win	9–1	(United States) Danielle Collins	9	Summer Olympics, France	Clay	QF	6–1, 2–6, 4–1 ret.	1	
Loss	9–2	(China) Zheng Qinwen	7	Summer Olympics, France	Clay	SF	2–6, 5–7	1	
Loss	9–3	Aryna Sabalenka	3	Cincinnati Open, United States	Hard	SF	3–6, 3–6	1	
Loss	9–4	(United States) Jessica Pegula	6	US Open, United States	Hard	QF	2–6, 4–6	1	
Loss	9–5	(United States) Coco Gauff	3	WTA Finals, Saudi Arabia	Hard (i)	RR	3–6, 4–6	2	
Win	10–5	Daria Kasatkina	9	WTA Finals, Saudi Arabia	Hard (i)	RR	6–1, 6–0	2	
Win	11–5	(Italy) Jasmine Paolini	4	Billie Jean King Cup, Spain	Hard (i)	SF	3–6, 6–4, 6–4	2	

==== Doubles ====
Result	W–L	Partner	Opponent	Rk	Tournament	Surface	Rd	Score	Rk	Ref
Win	1–0	(Poland) Katarzyna Kawa	(Czech Republic) Marie Bouzková / (Czech Republic) Kateřina Siniaková	49 / 1	Billie Jean King Cup, Spain	Hard (i)	QF	6–2, 6–4	—N/a	
Loss	1–1	(Poland) Katarzyna Kawa	(Italy) Sara Errani / (Italy) Jasmine Paolini	8 / 10	Billie Jean King Cup, Spain	Hard (i)	SF	5–7, 5–7	—N/a	

=== Finals ===
==== Singles: 5 (5 titles) ====
Legend Grand Slam tournaments (1–0) WTA Tour Championships (0–0) WTA Elite Trophy (0–0) WTA 1000 (4–0) WTA 500 (0–0) WTA 250 (0–0)	Finals by surface Hard (2–0) Clay (3–0) Grass (0–0)	Finals by setting Outdoor (5–0) Indoor (0–0)

Result	W–L	Date	Tournament	Tier	Surface	Opponent	Score
Win	1–0	Feb 2024	Qatar Open, Qatar	WTA 1000	Hard	(Kazakhstan) Elena Rybakina	7–6^{(10–8)}, 6–2
Win	2–0	Mar 2024	Indian Wells Open, United States	WTA 1000	Hard	(Greece) Maria Sakkari	6–4, 6–0
Win	3–0	May 2024	Madrid Open, Spain	WTA 1000	Clay	Aryna Sabalenka	7–5, 4–6, 7–6^{(9–7)}
Win	4–0	May 2024	Italian Open, Italy	WTA 1000	Clay	Aryna Sabalenka	6–2, 6–3
Win	5–0	June 2024	French Open, France	Grand Slam	Clay	(Italy) Jasmine Paolini	6–2, 6–1

=== Earnings ===
#	Tournament	Singles Prize money	Doubles Prize money	Year-to-date
1.	United Cup	$524,225	$0	$524,225
2.	Australian Open	$168,654	$0	$692,879
3.	Qatar Open	$523,485	$0	$1,216,364
4.	Dubai Tennis Championships	$158,944	$0	$1,375,308
5.	Indian Wells Open	$1,100,000	$0	$2,475,308
6.	Miami Open	$101,000	$0	$2,576,308
7.	Stuttgart Open	$44,526	$0	$2,620,834
8.	Madrid Open	$963,225	$0	$3,584,059
9.	Italian Open	$699,690	$0	$4,283,749
10.	French Open	$2,400,000	$0	$6,683,749
11.	Wimbledon Championships	$143,000	$0	$6,826,749
12.	Cincinnati Open	$158,944	$0	$6,985,693
13.	US Open	$530,000	$0	$7,515,693
14.	WTA Finals	$1,035,000	$0	$8,540,693
**Total prize money**		**$8,540,693**	**$0**	**$8,540,693**

== See also ==
- 2024 Aryna Sabalenka tennis season
- 2024 Elena Rybakina tennis season
- 2024 Coco Gauff tennis season
