= 2024 Aryna Sabalenka tennis season =

Tennis tournament

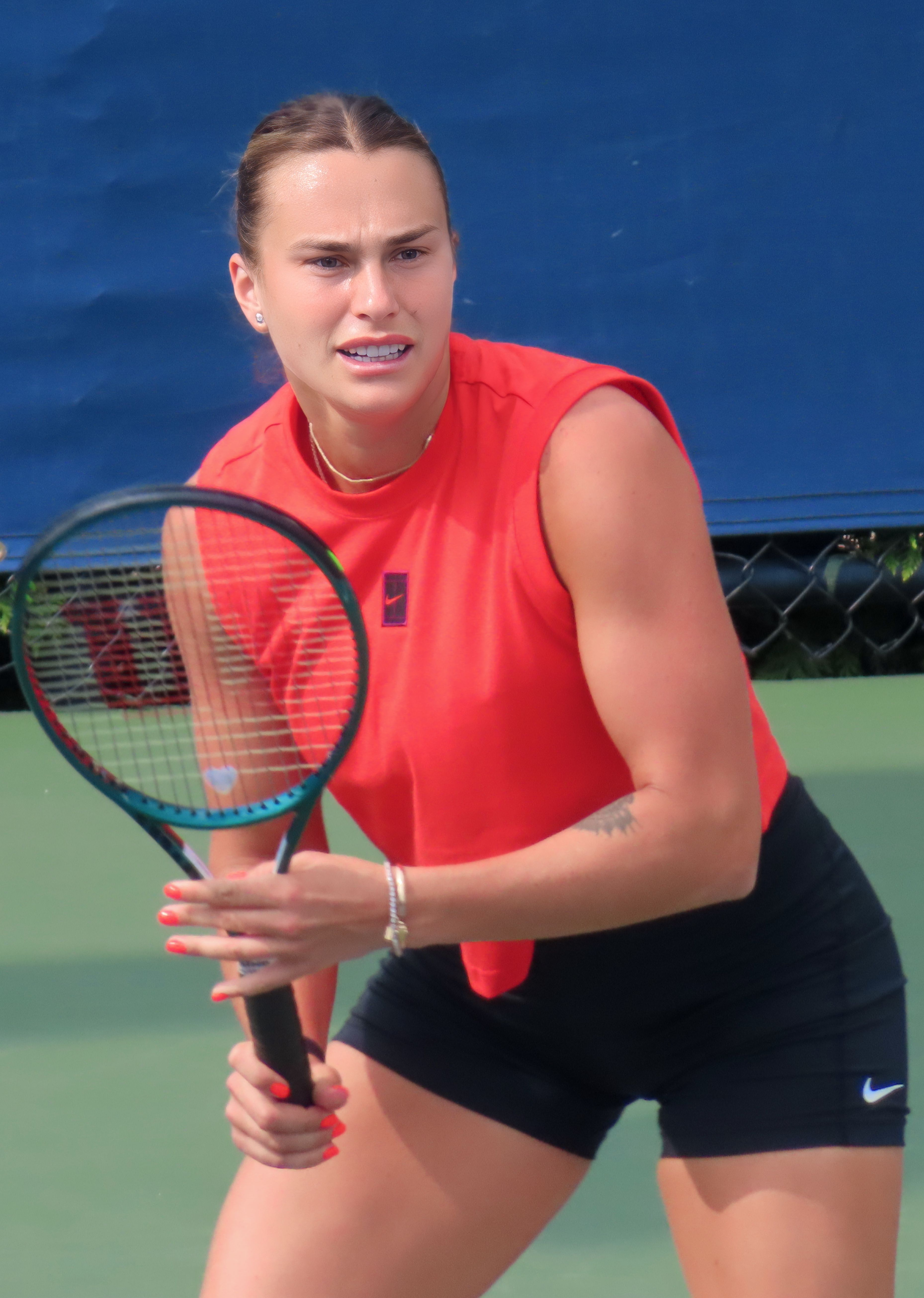
- Sabalenka at the 2024 US Open
- Full name: Aryna Siarhiejeŭna Sabalenka
- Country: (not allowed to play under the Belarusian flag)
- Calendar prize money: $9,729,260

Singles
- Season record: 56–14 (80%)
- Calendar titles: 4
- Current ranking: No. 1
- Ranking change from previous year: ▲1

Grand Slam & significant results
- Australian Open: W
- French Open: QF
- Wimbledon: A
- US Open: W
- Championships: SF

Injuries
- Injuries: Shoulder injury
- Last updated on: 9 November 2024.

The 2024 Aryna Sabalenka tennis season officially began on 31 December 2023, with the start of the Brisbane International in Brisbane.

== Yearly summary ==
In January, Sabalenka reached the final of the Brisbane International, defeating Victoria Azarenka in the semifinals, before losing the championship match to Elena Rybakina.

Sabalenka won the Australian Open without losing a set and became the first woman to defend her title there since Victoria Azarenka in 2013. She defeated 12th seed Zheng Qinwen in the final, having overcome Ella Seidel, Brenda Fruhvirtová, 28th seed Lesia Tsurenko, Amanda Anisimova, ninth seed Barbora Krejčíková and fourth seed Coco Gauff in the earlier rounds.

She reached the quarterfinals at Stuttgart, where she was eliminated by Markéta Vondroušová. As the defending champion in Madrid, she defeated Magda Linette, Robin Montgomery, Danielle Collins and Mirra Andreeva, before edging an epic three-set semifinal victory over world No. 4, Elena Rybakina. In total, she played four three-set matches to reach the final, dropping 60 games in the process, the most to reach the women's singles final in Madrid. In a rematch of the previous year's final, she faced Iga Świątek. Sabalenka had three championship points during the match, but eventually lost. In Rome, she saved three match points in her fourth-round match against Elina Svitolina and endured a lower-back injury before defeating her opponent in three sets. In the quarterfinal, she earned her third WTA top-10 win of the year by defeating Jeļena Ostapenko. It was followed by a semifinal victory over Danielle Collins, before Sabalenka fell again to Iga Świątek in the final, this time in straight sets.

She entered the French Open as the second seed, and defeated Erika Andreeva, Moyuka Uchijima, Paula Badosa and 22nd seed Emma Navarro in straight sets. In the quarterfinal, she was hampered by stomach issues and lost to Mirra Andreeva in three sets. With this loss, she fell in the WTA ranking to No. 3.

Sabalenka suffered a right shoulder injury that forced her to retire during her quarterfinal match against Anna Kalinskaya at the Berlin Ladies Open in June and she withdrew from the 2024 Wimbledon Championships, having failed to recover in time to play. She won the Cincinnati Open in August, with victories over Iga Świątek in the semifinals and Jessica Pegula in the final.

In September, Sabalenka won the US Open, overcoming qualifier Priscilla Hon, Lucia Bronzetti, 29th seed Ekaterina Alexandrova, former doubles partner Elise Mertens, Olympic champion and seventh seed Zheng Qinwen and 13th seed Emma Navarro, before defeating sixth seed Jessica Pegula in straight sets in the final to claim her third major title.

Sabalenka continued her great form at the China Open in Beijing, where she defeated Mananchaya Sawangkaew, Ashlyn Krueger and Madison Keys all in straight sets to increase her winning streak to 15 matches. Sabalenka lost in the quarterfinals to Karolína Muchová in three sets.

At the Wuhan Open, where she won back-to-back in 2018 and 2019, before the tournament was suspended due to COVID-19 from 2020 until 2023, Sabalenka defeated Kateřina Siniaková in straight sets in her opening match. In the next round, she came back from a set down against Yulia Putintseva to advance to the quarterfinals, where she defeated Magdalena Fręch. Sabalenka faced fourth seed Coco Gauff in the semifinals, mounting a comeback from a set and a break down to the reach final for the third time. In the final, she defeated fifth seed Zheng Qinwen in three sets to lift her third Wuhan Open title and her second WTA 1000 for the 2024 season.

After 11 months off the top in October, she regained the WTA world No.1 ranking. Following wins against Zheng Qinwen and Jasmine Paolini in her first two group matches at the WTA Finals, combined with Iga Świątek's loss to Coco Gauff, Sabalenka for the first time would finish the year as No. 1. Sabalenka lost her last group match to Elena Rybakina and was defeated by Gauff in the semifinals.

In December, Sabalenka was named WTA Player of the Year.

== All matches ==
This table chronicles all the matches of Aryna Sabalenka in 2024.

Key
W	F	SF	QF	#R	RR	Q#	P#	DNQ	A	Z#	PO	G	S	B	NMS	NTI	P	NH

(W) winner; (F) finalist; (SF) semifinalist; (QF) quarterfinalist; (#R) rounds 4, 3, 2, 1; (RR) round-robin stage; (Q#) qualification round; (P#) preliminary round; (DNQ) did not qualify; (A) absent; (Z#) Davis/Fed Cup Zonal Group (with number indication) or (PO) play-off; (G) gold, (S) silver or (B) bronze Olympic/Paralympic medal; (NMS) not a Masters tournament; (NTI) not a Tier I tournament; (P) postponed; (NH) not held; (SR) strike rate (events won / competed); (W–L) win–loss record.
To avoid confusion and double counting, these charts are updated at the conclusion of a tournament or when the player's participation has ended.

=== Singles matches ===
Tournament	Match	Round	Opponent	Rank	Result	Score
Brisbane International; Brisbane, Australia; WTA 500; Hard, outdoor; 31 December 2023 – 7 January 2024	–	1R	Bye			
Brisbane International; Brisbane, Australia; WTA 500; Hard, outdoor; 31 December 2023 – 7 January 2024	1	2R	(Italy) Lucia Bronzetti	52	Win	6–3, 6–0
Brisbane International; Brisbane, Australia; WTA 500; Hard, outdoor; 31 December 2023 – 7 January 2024	2	3R	(China) Zhu Lin (15)	33	Win	6–1, 6–0
Brisbane International; Brisbane, Australia; WTA 500; Hard, outdoor; 31 December 2023 – 7 January 2024	3	QF	Daria Kasatkina (Note: Russian and Belarus players are not allowed to compete under the name or flag of their country following the Russian invasion of Ukraine.) (5)	18	Win	6–1, 6–4
Brisbane International; Brisbane, Australia; WTA 500; Hard, outdoor; 31 December 2023 – 7 January 2024	4	SF	Victoria Azarenka (8)	23	Win	6–2, 6–4
Brisbane International; Brisbane, Australia; WTA 500; Hard, outdoor; 31 December 2023 – 7 January 2024	5	F	(Kazakhstan) Elena Rybakina (2)	4	Loss	0–6, 3–6
Australian Open; Melbourne, Australia; Grand Slam; Hard, outdoor; 14 January 2024 – 28 January 2024	6	1R	(Germany) Ella Seidel (Q)	173	Win	6–0, 6–1
Australian Open; Melbourne, Australia; Grand Slam; Hard, outdoor; 14 January 2024 – 28 January 2024	7	2R	(Czech Republic) Brenda Fruhvirtová (Q)	107	Win	6–3, 6–2
Australian Open; Melbourne, Australia; Grand Slam; Hard, outdoor; 14 January 2024 – 28 January 2024	8	3R	(Ukraine) Lesia Tsurenko (28)	33	Win	6–0, 6–0
Australian Open; Melbourne, Australia; Grand Slam; Hard, outdoor; 14 January 2024 – 28 January 2024	9	4R	(United States) Amanda Anisimova (PR)	442	Win	6–3, 6–2
Australian Open; Melbourne, Australia; Grand Slam; Hard, outdoor; 14 January 2024 – 28 January 2024	10	QF	(Czech Republic) Barbora Krejčíková (9)	11	Win	6–2, 6–3
Australian Open; Melbourne, Australia; Grand Slam; Hard, outdoor; 14 January 2024 – 28 January 2024	11	SF	(United States) Coco Gauff (4)	4	Win	7–6^{(7–2)}, 6–4
Australian Open; Melbourne, Australia; Grand Slam; Hard, outdoor; 14 January 2024 – 28 January 2024	12	W	(China) Zheng Qinwen (12)	15	Win (1)	6–3, 6–2
Dubai Tennis Championships; Dubai, UAE; WTA 1000; Hard, outdoor; 18 February 2024 – 24 February 2024	–	1R	Bye			
Dubai Tennis Championships; Dubai, UAE; WTA 1000; Hard, outdoor; 18 February 2024 – 24 February 2024	13	2R	(Croatia) Donna Vekić	31	Loss	7–6^{(7–5)}, 3–6, 0–6
Indian Wells Open; Indian Wells, United States; WTA 1000; Hard, outdoor; 6 March 2024 – 17 March 2024	–	1R	Bye			
Indian Wells Open; Indian Wells, United States; WTA 1000; Hard, outdoor; 6 March 2024 – 17 March 2024	14	2R	(United States) Peyton Stearns	64	Win	6–7^{(2–7)}, 6–2, 7–6^{(8–6)}
Indian Wells Open; Indian Wells, United States; WTA 1000; Hard, outdoor; 6 March 2024 – 17 March 2024	15	3R	(United Kingdom) Emma Raducanu (WC)	250	Win	6–3, 7–5
Indian Wells Open; Indian Wells, United States; WTA 1000; Hard, outdoor; 6 March 2024 – 17 March 2024	16	4R	(United States) Emma Navarro (23)	23	Loss	3–6, 6–3, 2–6
Miami Open; Miami Gardens, United States; WTA 1000; Hard, outdoor; 19 March 2024 – 31 March 2024	–	1R	Bye			
Miami Open; Miami Gardens, United States; WTA 1000; Hard, outdoor; 19 March 2024 – 31 March 2024	17	2R	(Spain) Paula Badosa (PR)	80	Win	6–4, 6–3
Miami Open; Miami Gardens, United States; WTA 1000; Hard, outdoor; 19 March 2024 – 31 March 2024	18	3R	(Ukraine) Anhelina Kalinina (32)	36	Loss	4–6, 6–1, 1–6
Stuttgart Open; Stuttgart, Germany; WTA 500; Clay, indoor; 15 April 2022 – 21 April 2024	–	1R	Bye			
Stuttgart Open; Stuttgart, Germany; WTA 500; Clay, indoor; 15 April 2022 – 21 April 2024	19	2R	(Spain) Paula Badosa (PR)	93	Win	7–6^{(7–4)}, 4–6, 3–3 ret.
Stuttgart Open; Stuttgart, Germany; WTA 500; Clay, indoor; 15 April 2022 – 21 April 2024	20	QF	(Czech Republic) Markéta Vondroušová (6)	8	Loss	6–3, 3–6, 5–7
Madrid Open; Madrid, Spain; WTA 1000; Clay, outdoor; 23 April 2024 – 5 May 2024	–	1R	Bye			
Madrid Open; Madrid, Spain; WTA 1000; Clay, outdoor; 23 April 2024 – 5 May 2024	21	2R	(Poland) Magda Linette	48	Win	6–4, 3–6, 6–3
Madrid Open; Madrid, Spain; WTA 1000; Clay, outdoor; 23 April 2024 – 5 May 2024	22	3R	(United States) Robin Montgomery (WC)	183	Win	6–1, 6–7^{(5–7)}, 6–4
Madrid Open; Madrid, Spain; WTA 1000; Clay, outdoor; 23 April 2024 – 5 May 2024	23	4R	(United States) Danielle Collins (13)	15	Win	4–6, 6–4, 6–3
Madrid Open; Madrid, Spain; WTA 1000; Clay, outdoor; 23 April 2024 – 5 May 2024	24	QF	Mirra Andreeva	43	Win	6–1, 6–4
Madrid Open; Madrid, Spain; WTA 1000; Clay, outdoor; 23 April 2024 – 5 May 2024	25	SF	(Kazakhstan) Elena Rybakina (4)	4	Win	1–6, 7–5, 7–6^{(7–5)}
Madrid Open; Madrid, Spain; WTA 1000; Clay, outdoor; 23 April 2024 – 5 May 2024	26	F	(Poland) Iga Świątek (1)	1	Loss	5–7, 6–4, 6–7^{(7–9)}
Italian Open; Rome, Italy; WTA 1000; Clay, outdoor; 8 May 2024 – 19 May 2024	–	1R	Bye			
Italian Open; Rome, Italy; WTA 1000; Clay, outdoor; 8 May 2024 – 19 May 2024	27	2R	(United States) Katie Volynets (Q)	109	Win	4–6, 6–3, 6–2
Italian Open; Rome, Italy; WTA 1000; Clay, outdoor; 8 May 2024 – 19 May 2024	28	3R	(Ukraine) Dayana Yastremska (32)	33	Win	6–4, 6–2
Italian Open; Rome, Italy; WTA 1000; Clay, outdoor; 8 May 2024 – 19 May 2024	29	4R	(Ukraine) Elina Svitolina (16)	19	Win	4–6, 6–1, 7–6^{(9–7)}
Italian Open; Rome, Italy; WTA 1000; Clay, outdoor; 8 May 2024 – 19 May 2024	30	QF	(Latvia) Jeļena Ostapenko (10)	10	Win	6–2, 6–4
Italian Open; Rome, Italy; WTA 1000; Clay, outdoor; 8 May 2024 – 19 May 2024	31	SF	(United States) Danielle Collins (13)	15	Win	7–5, 6–2
Italian Open; Rome, Italy; WTA 1000; Clay, outdoor; 8 May 2024 – 19 May 2024	32	F	(Poland) Iga Świątek (1)	1	Loss	2–6, 3–6
French Open; Paris, France; Grand Slam; Clay, outdoor; 20 May 2024 – 9 June 2024	33	1R	Erika Andreeva	101	Win	6–2, 6–1
French Open; Paris, France; Grand Slam; Clay, outdoor; 20 May 2024 – 9 June 2024	34	2R	(Japan) Moyuka Uchijima (Q)	83	Win	6–2, 6–2
French Open; Paris, France; Grand Slam; Clay, outdoor; 20 May 2024 – 9 June 2024	35	3R	(Spain) Paula Badosa	139	Win	7–5, 6–1
French Open; Paris, France; Grand Slam; Clay, outdoor; 20 May 2024 – 9 June 2024	36	4R	(United States) Emma Navarro (22)	24	Win	6–2, 6–3
French Open; Paris, France; Grand Slam; Clay, outdoor; 20 May 2024 – 9 June 2024	37	QF	Mirra Andreeva	38	Loss	7–6^{(7–5)}, 4–6, 4–6
German Open; Berlin, Germany; WTA 500; Grass, outdoor; 17 June 2024 – 23 June 2024	–	1R	Bye			
German Open; Berlin, Germany; WTA 500; Grass, outdoor; 17 June 2024 – 23 June 2024	38	2R	Daria Kasatkina	14	Win	6–1, 6–4
German Open; Berlin, Germany; WTA 500; Grass, outdoor; 17 June 2024 – 23 June 2024	39	QF	Anna Kalinskaya	24	Loss	1–5 ret.
Wimbledon; London, United Kingdom; Grand Slam; Grass, outdoor; 1 July 2024 – 14 July 2024	Withdrew					
Washington Open; Washington DC, United States; WTA 500; Hard, outdoor; 29 July 2024 – 4 August 2024	–	1R	Bye			
Washington Open; Washington DC, United States; WTA 500; Hard, outdoor; 29 July 2024 – 4 August 2024	40	2R	Kamilla Rakhimova (Q)	105	Win	7–5, 4–6, 6–4
Washington Open; Washington DC, United States; WTA 500; Hard, outdoor; 29 July 2024 – 4 August 2024	41	QF	Victoria Azarenka (6)	20	Win	6–4, 6–4
Washington Open; Washington DC, United States; WTA 500; Hard, outdoor; 29 July 2024 – 4 August 2024	42	SF	(Czech Republic) Marie Bouzková	43	Loss	4–6, 6–3, 3–6
Canadian Open; Toronto, Canada; WTA 1000; Hard, outdoor; 6 August 2024 – 12 August 2024	–	1R	Bye			
Canadian Open; Toronto, Canada; WTA 1000; Hard, outdoor; 6 August 2024 – 12 August 2024	43	2R	(China) Yuan Yue	42	Win	6–2, 6–2
Canadian Open; Toronto, Canada; WTA 1000; Hard, outdoor; 6 August 2024 – 12 August 2024	44	3R	(United Kingdom) Katie Boulter	33	Win	6–3, 6–3
Canadian Open; Toronto, Canada; WTA 1000; Hard, outdoor; 6 August 2024 – 12 August 2024	45	QF	(United States) Amanda Anisimova (PR)	132	Loss	4–6, 2–6
Cincinnati Open; Mason, United States; WTA 1000; Hard, outdoor; 13 August 2024 – 19 August 2024	–	1R	Bye			
Cincinnati Open; Mason, United States; WTA 1000; Hard, outdoor; 13 August 2024 – 19 August 2024	46	2R	(Italy) Elisabetta Cocciaretto	66	Win	6–3, 6–4
Cincinnati Open; Mason, United States; WTA 1000; Hard, outdoor; 13 August 2024 – 19 August 2024	47	3R	(Ukraine) Elina Svitolina	30	Win	7–5, 6–2
Cincinnati Open; Mason, United States; WTA 1000; Hard, outdoor; 13 August 2024 – 19 August 2024	48	QF	Liudmila Samsonova (10)	17	Win	6–3, 6–2
Cincinnati Open; Mason, United States; WTA 1000; Hard, outdoor; 13 August 2024 – 19 August 2024	49	SF	(Poland) Iga Świątek (1)	1	Win	6–3, 6–3
Cincinnati Open; Mason, United States; WTA 1000; Hard, outdoor; 13 August 2024 – 19 August 2024	50	W	(United States) Jessica Pegula (6)	6	Win (2)	6–3, 7–5
US Open; New York City, United States; Grand Slam; Hard, outdoor; 26 August 2024 – 8 September 2024	51	1R	(Australia) Priscilla Hon (Q)	205	Win	6–3, 6–3
US Open; New York City, United States; Grand Slam; Hard, outdoor; 26 August 2024 – 8 September 2024	52	2R	(Italy) Lucia Bronzetti	76	Win	6–3, 6–1
US Open; New York City, United States; Grand Slam; Hard, outdoor; 26 August 2024 – 8 September 2024	53	3R	Ekaterina Alexandrova (29)	31	Win	2–6, 6–1, 6–2
US Open; New York City, United States; Grand Slam; Hard, outdoor; 26 August 2024 – 8 September 2024	54	4R	(Belgium) Elise Mertens (33)	35	Win	6–2, 6–4
US Open; New York City, United States; Grand Slam; Hard, outdoor; 26 August 2024 – 8 September 2024	55	QF	(China) Zheng Qinwen (7)	7	Win	6–1, 6–2
US Open; New York City, United States; Grand Slam; Hard, outdoor; 26 August 2024 – 8 September 2024	56	SF	(United States) Emma Navarro (13)	12	Win	6–3, 7–6^{(7–2)}
US Open; New York City, United States; Grand Slam; Hard, outdoor; 26 August 2024 – 8 September 2024	57	W	(United States) Jessica Pegula (6)	6	Win (3)	7–5, 7–5
China Open; Beijing, China; WTA 1000; Hard, outdoor; 25 September 2024– 6 October 2024	–	1R	Bye			
China Open; Beijing, China; WTA 1000; Hard, outdoor; 25 September 2024– 6 October 2024	58	2R	(Thailand) Mananchaya Sawangkaew (Q)	187	Win	6–4, 6–1
China Open; Beijing, China; WTA 1000; Hard, outdoor; 25 September 2024– 6 October 2024	59	3R	(United States) Ashlyn Krueger	68	Win	6–2, 6–2
China Open; Beijing, China; WTA 1000; Hard, outdoor; 25 September 2024– 6 October 2024	60	4R	(United States) Madison Keys (18)	24	Win	6–4, 6–3
China Open; Beijing, China; WTA 1000; Hard, outdoor; 25 September 2024– 6 October 2024	61	QF	(Czech Republic) Karolína Muchová	49	Loss	6–7^{(5–7)}, 6–2, 4–6
Wuhan Open; Wuhan, China; WTA 1000; Hard, outdoor; 7 October 2024– 13 October 2024	–	1R	Bye			
Wuhan Open; Wuhan, China; WTA 1000; Hard, outdoor; 7 October 2024– 13 October 2024	62	2R	(Czech Republic) Kateřina Siniaková	37	Win	6–4, 6–4
Wuhan Open; Wuhan, China; WTA 1000; Hard, outdoor; 7 October 2024– 13 October 2024	63	3R	(Kazakhstan) Yulia Putintseva	35	Win	1–6, 6–4, 6–0
Wuhan Open; Wuhan, China; WTA 1000; Hard, outdoor; 7 October 2024– 13 October 2024	64	QF	(Poland) Magdalena Fręch	27	Win	6–2, 6–2
Wuhan Open; Wuhan, China; WTA 1000; Hard, outdoor; 7 October 2024– 13 October 2024	65	SF	(United States) Coco Gauff (4)	4	Win	1–6, 6–4, 6–4
Wuhan Open; Wuhan, China; WTA 1000; Hard, outdoor; 7 October 2024– 13 October 2024	66	W	(China) Zheng Qinwen (5)	7	Win (4)	6–3, 5–7, 6–3
WTA Finals; Riyadh, Saudi Arabia; Year-end championships; Hard, indoor; 2 November 2024 – 9 November 2024	67	RR	(China) Zheng Qinwen (7)	7	Win	6–3, 6–4
WTA Finals; Riyadh, Saudi Arabia; Year-end championships; Hard, indoor; 2 November 2024 – 9 November 2024	68	RR	(Italy) Jasmine Paolini (4)	4	Win	6–3, 7–5
WTA Finals; Riyadh, Saudi Arabia; Year-end championships; Hard, indoor; 2 November 2024 – 9 November 2024	69	RR	(Kazakhstan) Elena Rybakina (5)	5	Loss	4–6, 6–3, 1–6
WTA Finals; Riyadh, Saudi Arabia; Year-end championships; Hard, indoor; 2 November 2024 – 9 November 2024	70	SF	(United States) Coco Gauff (3)	3	Loss	6–7^{(4–7)}, 3–6

== Schedule ==
Per Aryna Sabalenka, this is her current 2024 schedule (subject to change).

=== Singles schedule ===
Key
W	F	SF	QF	#R	RR

(W) winner; (F) finalist; (SF) semifinalist; (QF) quarterfinalist; (#R) rounds 4, 3, 2, 1; (RR) round-robin stage.

Date	Tournament	Location	Tier	Surface	Prev. result	Prev. points	New points	Result
31 December 2023 – 7 January 2024	Brisbane International	Australia	WTA 500	Hard	A	A	325	Final lost to (Kazakhstan) Elena Rybakina; 0–6, 3–6
14 January 2024– 28 January 2024	Australian Open	Australia	Grand Slam	Hard	W	2000	2000	Winner defeated (China) Zheng Qinwen; 6–3, 6–2
12 February 2024– 18 February 2024	Qatar Open	Qatar	WTA 1000	Hard	A	A	0	Withdrew
19 February 2024– 25 February 2024	Dubai Tennis Championships	UAE	WTA 1000	Hard	QF	190	10	Second round lost to (Croatia) Donna Vekić; 7–6^{(7–5)}, 3–6, 0–6
6 March 2024 – 17 March 2024	Indian Wells Open	United States	WTA 1000	Hard	F	650	120	Fourth round lost to (United States) Emma Navarro; 3–6, 6–3, 2–6
20 March 2024 – 31 March 2024	Miami Open	United States	WTA 1000	Hard	QF	180	65	Third round lost to (Ukraine) Anhelina Kalinina; 4–6, 6–1, 1–6
15 April 2024 – 21 April 2024	Stuttgart Open	Germany	WTA 500	Clay (i)	F	305	108	Quarterfinal lost to (Czech Republic) Markéta Vondroušová; 6–3, 3–6, 5–7
23 April 2024 – 5 May 2024	Madrid Open	Spain	WTA 1000	Clay	W	1000	650	Final lost to (Poland) Iga Świątek; 5–7, 6–4, 6–7^{(7–9)}
8 May 2024 – 19 May 2024	Italian Open	Italy	WTA 1000	Clay	2R	10	650	Final lost to (Poland) Iga Świątek; 2–6, 3–6
20 May 2024 – 9 June 2024	French Open	France	Grand Slam	Clay	SF	780	430	Quarterfinal lost to Mirra Andreeva; 7–6^{(7–5)}, 4–6, 4–6
17 June 2024 – 23 June 2024	German Open	Germany	WTA 500	Grass	2R	55	108	Quarterfinal lost to Anna Kalinskaya; 1–5 ret.
1 July 2024 – 14 July 2024	Wimbledon Championships	United Kingdom	Grand Slam	Grass	SF	780	0	Withdrew
29 July 2024 – 4 August 2024	Washington Open	United States	WTA 500	Hard	A	A	195	Semifinal lost to (Czech Republic) Marie Bouzková; 4–6, 6–3, 3–6
6 August 2024 – 12 August 2024	Canadian Open	Canada	WTA 1000	Hard	3R	105	215	Quarterfinal lost to (United States) Amanda Anisimova; 4–6, 2–6
13 August 2024 – 19 August 2024	Cincinnati Open	United States	WTA 1000	Hard	SF	350	1000	Winner defeated (United States) Jessica Pegula; 6–3, 7–5
26 August 2024 – 8 September 2024	US Open	United States	Grand Slam	Hard	F	1300	2000	Winner defeated (United States) Jessica Pegula; 7–5, 7–5
25 September 2024 – 6 October 2024	China Open	China	WTA 1000	Hard	QF	215	215	Quarterfinal lost to (Czech Republic) Karolína Muchová; 6–7^{(5–7)}, 6–2, 4–6
7 October 2024 – 13 October 2024	Wuhan Open	China	WTA 1000	Hard	NH	—	1000	Winner defeated (China) Zheng Qinwen; 6–3, 5–7, 6–3
2 Novewmber 2024 – 9 November 2024	WTA Finals	Saudi Arabia	WTA Finals	Hard	SF	625	400	Semifinal lost to (United States) Coco Gauff; 6–7^{(4–7)}, 3–6
Total year-end points						8545	9416	▲871 (difference)

== Yearly records ==
=== Head-to-head match-ups ===
Sabalenka has a 56–14 (80%) WTA match win–loss record in the 2024 season. Her record against players who were part of the WTA rankings top ten at the time of their meetings is 11–6 (65%). Bold indicates player was ranked top 10 at the time of at least one meeting. The following list is ordered by number of wins:

- (China) **Zheng Qinwen** 4–0
- (Spain) Paula Badosa 3–0
- (United States) **Jessica Pegula** 2–0
- (United States) Danielle Collins 2–0
- Daria Kasatkina 2–0
- Victoria Azarenka 2–0
- (Ukraine) Elina Svitolina 2–0
- (Italy) Lucia Bronzetti 2–0
- (United States) **Coco Gauff** 2–1
- (United States) Emma Navarro 2–1
- (China) Zhu Lin 1–0
- (Germany) Ella Seidel 1–0
- (Czech Republic) Brenda Fruhvirtová 1–0
- (Ukraine) Lesia Tsurenko 1–0
- (Czech Republic) Barbora Krejčíková 1–0
- (United States) Peyton Stearns 1–0
- (United Kingdom) Emma Raducanu 1–0
- (Poland) Magda Linette 1–0
- (United States) Robin Montgomery 1–0
- (United States) Katie Volynets 1–0
- (Ukraine) Dayana Yastremska 1–0
- (Latvia) **Jeļena Ostapenko** 1–0
- Erika Andreeva 1–0
- (Japan) Moyuka Uchijima 1–0
- Kamilla Rakhimova 1–0
- (China) Yuan Yue 1–0
- (United Kingdom) Katie Boulter 1–0
- (Italy) Elisabetta Cocciaretto 1–0
- Liudmila Samsonova 1–0
- (Australia) Priscilla Hon 1–0
- Ekaterina Alexandrova 1–0
- (Belgium) Elise Mertens 1–0
- (Thailand) Mananchaya Sawangkaew 1–0
- (United States) Ashlyn Krueger 1–0
- (United States) Madison Keys 1–0
- (Czech Republic) Kateřina Siniaková 1–0
- (Kazakhstan) Yulia Putintseva 1–0
- (Poland) Magdalena Fręch 1–0
- Mirra Andreeva 1–1
- (United States) Amanda Anisimova 1–1
- (Poland) **Iga Świątek** 1–2
- (Kazakhstan) **Elena Rybakina** 1–2
- (Croatia) Donna Vekić 0–1
- (Ukraine) Anhelina Kalinina 0–1
- (Czech Republic) **Markéta Vondroušová** 0–1
- Anna Kalinskaya 0–1
- (Czech Republic) Marie Bouzková 0–1
- (Czech Republic) Karolína Muchová 0–1

=== Top 10 record ===
Result	W–L	Opponent	Rk	Tournament	Surface	Rd	Score	Rk	Ref
Loss	0–1	(Kazakhstan) Elena Rybakina	4	Brisbane International, Australia	Hard	F	0–6, 3–6	2	
Win	1–1	(United States) Coco Gauff	4	Australian Open, Australia	Hard	SF	7–6^{(7–2)}, 6–4	2	
Loss	1–2	(Czech Republic) Markéta Vondroušová	8	Stuttgart Open, Germany	Clay (i)	QF	6–3, 3–6, 5–7	2	
Win	2–2	(Kazakhstan) Elena Rybakina	4	Madrid Open, Spain	Clay	SF	1–6, 7–5, 7–6^{(7–5)}	2	
Loss	2–3	(Poland) Iga Świątek	**1**	Madrid Open, Spain	Clay	F	5–7, 6–4, 6–7^{(7–9)}	2	
Win	3–3	(Latvia) Jeļena Ostapenko	10	Italian Open, Italy	Clay	QF	6–2, 6–4	2	
Loss	3–4	(Poland) Iga Świątek	**1**	Italian Open, Italy	Clay	F	2–6, 3–6	2	
Win	4–4	(Poland) Iga Świątek	**1**	Cincinnati Open, United States	Hard	SF	6–3, 6–3	3	
Win	5–4	(United States) Jessica Pegula	6	Cincinnati Open, United States	Hard	F	6–3, 7–5	3	
Win	6–4	(China) Zheng Qinwen	7	US Open, United States	Hard	QF	6–1, 6–2	2	
Win	7–4	(United States) Jessica Pegula	6	US Open, United States	Hard	F	7–5, 7–5	2	
Win	8–4	(United States) Coco Gauff	4	Wuhan Open, China	Hard	SF	1–6, 6–4, 6–4	2	
Win	9–4	(China) Zheng Qinwen	7	Wuhan Open, China	Hard	F	6–3, 5–7, 6–3	2	
Win	10–4	(China) Zheng Qinwen	7	WTA Finals, Saudi Arabia	Hard (i)	RR	6–3, 6–4	**1**	
Win	11–4	(Italy) Jasmine Paolini	4	WTA Finals, Saudi Arabia	Hard (i)	RR	6–3, 7–5	**1**	
Loss	11–5	(Kazakhstan) Elena Rybakina	5	WTA Finals, Saudi Arabia	Hard (i)	RR	4–6, 6–3, 1–6	**1**	
Loss	11–6	(United States) Coco Gauff	3	WTA Finals, Saudi Arabia	Hard (i)	SF	6–7^{(4–7)}, 3–6	**1**	

- Key: (Rk) first use, opponent rank; (Rd) round; (Rk) 2nd use, player rank; (Ref) reference; (F) final; (SF) semifinal; (QF) quarterfinal; (#R) rounds 4, 3, 2, 1; (RR) round-robin stage; (Q#) qualifying rounds or stages (3), 2, 1.

=== Finals ===
==== Singles: 7 (4 titles, 3 runner-ups) ====
Legend Grand Slam tournaments (2–0) WTA Tour Championships (0–0) WTA 1000 (2–2) WTA 500 (0–1)	Finals by surface Hard (4–1) Clay (0–2)	Finals by setting Outdoor (4–3) Indoor (0–0)

Result	W–L	Date	Tournament	Tier	Surface	Opponent	Score
Loss	0–1	Jan 2024	Brisbane International, Australia	WTA 500	Hard	(Kazakhstan) Elena Rybakina	0–6, 3–6
Win	1–1	Jan 2024	Australian Open, Australia	Grand Slam	Hard	(China) Zheng Qinwen	6–3, 6–2
Loss	1–2	May 2024	Madrid Open, Spain	WTA 1000	Clay	(Poland) Iga Świątek	5–7, 6–4, 6–7^{(7–9)}
Loss	1–3	May 2024	Italian Open, Italy	WTA 1000	Clay	(Poland) Iga Świątek	2–6, 3–6
Win	2–3	Aug 2024	Cincinnati Open, United States	WTA 1000	Hard	(United States) Jessica Pegula	6–3, 7–5
Win	3–3	Sep 2024	US Open, United States	Grand Slam	Hard	(United States) Jessica Pegula	7-5, 7-5
Win	4–3	Oct 2024	Wuhan Open, China	WTA 1000	Hard	(China) Zheng Qinwen	6–3, 5–7, 6–3

=== Earnings ===
- **Bold** font denotes tournament win

**Singles**
Event	Prize money	Year-to-date
Brisbane International	$135,000	$135,000
**Australian Open**	**A$3,150,000**	$2,218,371
Dubai Tennis Championships	$20,650	$2,239,021
Indian Wells Open	$101,000	$2,340,021
Miami Open	$59,100	$2,399,121
Stuttgart Open	$23,435	$2,422,556
Madrid Open	€512,260	$2,934,816
Italian Open	€365,015	$3,299,831
French Open	€415,000	$3,714,831
German Open	€21,660	$3,736,491
Washington Open	$51,204	$3,787,695
Canadian Open	$72,965	$3,860,660
**Cincinnati Open**	**$523,485**	$4,384,145
**US Open**	**$3,600,000**	$7,984,145
China Open	$185,000	$8,169,145
**Wuhan Open**	**$525,115**	$8,694,260
WTA Finals	$1,035,000	$9,729,260
		$9,729,260
**Doubles**
Event	Prize money	Year-to-date
		$0
**Total**
		**$9,729,260**

Figures in United States dollars (USD) unless noted.

== See also ==
- 2024 Iga Świątek tennis season
- 2024 Elena Rybakina tennis season
- 2024 Coco Gauff tennis season
