= 2024 Elena Rybakina tennis season =

Tennis season statistics

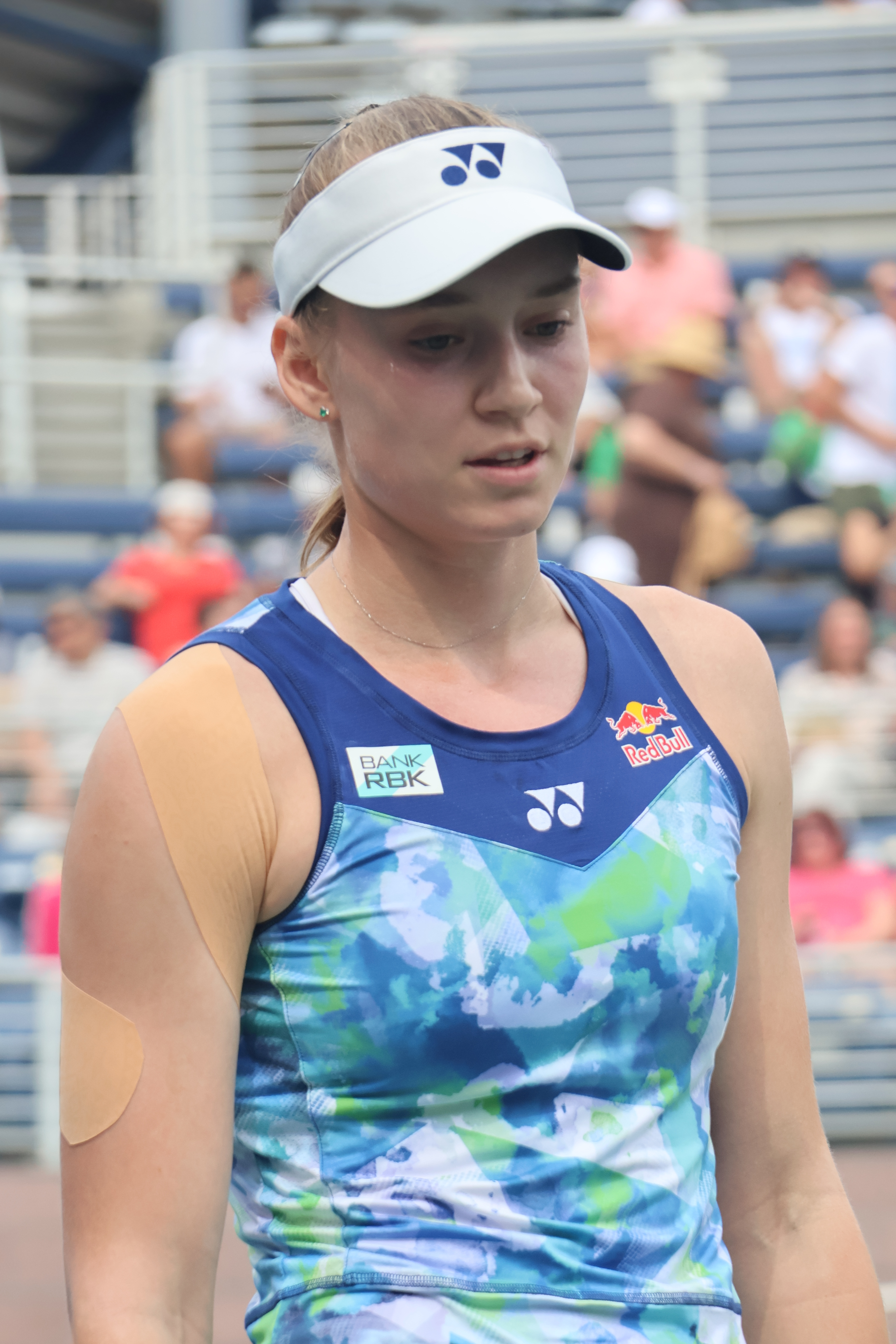
- Rybakina at the 2023 US Open
- Full name: Elena Rybakina
- Country: Kazakhstan
- Calendar prize money: $3,876,915

Singles
- Season record: 42–11 (79%)
- Calendar titles: 3
- Current ranking: No. 5
- Ranking change from previous year: ▼1

Grand Slam & significant results
- Australian Open: 2R
- French Open: QF
- Wimbledon: SF
- US Open: 2R
- Last updated on: 7 November 2024.

The 2024 Elena Rybakina tennis season officially began on 31 December 2023, with the start of the Brisbane International in Brisbane.

During this season, Rybakina:

- Won three titles at WTA 500 titles at Brisbane International, Abu Dhabi Open, and Stuttgart Open.
- Reached two WTA 1000 finals at Qatar Open, and Miami Open.
- Reached the semifinals of Wimbledon.
- Finished the year with over 75% winning percentage for second consecutive year.

== Yearly summary ==
Rybakina started her 2024 season by winning the Brisbane International final against Aryna Sabalenka, before going out in the second-round at the Australian Open to Anna Blinkova in a match that featured the longest tie-break in Grand Slam history.

She won the Abu Dhabi Open in February, beating Daria Kasatkina in the final. Rybakina secured her third title of the season in April at the Porsche Tennis Grand Prix in Stuttgart, beating two-time defending champion Iga Swiatek in the semifinals, and then Marta Kostyuk in straight sets in the final. She made it through to the quarter-finals at the French Open, before losing to eventual runner-up Jasmine Paolini.

Moving onto the grass-court swing of the year, Rybakina retired due to illness during her quarter-final against Victoria Azarenka at the Berlin Ladies Open and then withdrew from the following week's Eastbourne International. At Wimbledon she steamrollered former world number one Caroline Wozniacki in just 57 minutes and for the loss of only one game in the third-round before winning her round four match when opponent Anna Kalinskaya retired injured in the second set. Rybakina defeated Elina Svitolina in the quarter-finals but lost to Barbora Krejčíková in the semi-finals.

Rybakina withdrew from the Paris Olympics two days before it got underway due to acute bronchitis. She defeated qualifier Destanee Aiava in the first round at the US Open but then withdrew from the tournament due to unspecified injuries. On 23 September, Rybakina announced she would miss the entire Asian swing of the season due to a back injury.

Rybakina played her first match since August at the WTA Finals in November, losing her opening group contest to Jasmine Paolini in straight sets. She lost her second group match in three sets to Zheng Qinwen. Despite defeating world No.1 Aryna Sabalenka in her final group match, Rybakina failed to reach the semifinals.

== All matches ==
This table chronicles all the matches of Elena Rybakina in 2024.

Key
| W | F | SF | QF | #R | RR | Q# | P# | DNQ | A | Z# | PO | G | S | B | NMS | NTI | P | NH |

(W) winner; (F) finalist; (SF) semifinalist; (QF) quarterfinalist; (#R) rounds 4, 3, 2, 1; (RR) round-robin stage; (Q#) qualification round; (P#) preliminary round; (DNQ) did not qualify; (A) absent; (Z#) Davis/Fed Cup Zonal Group (with number indication) or (PO) play-off; (G) gold, (S) silver or (B) bronze Olympic/Paralympic medal; (NMS) not a Masters tournament; (NTI) not a Tier I tournament; (P) postponed; (NH) not held; (SR) strike rate (events won / competed); (W–L) win–loss record.
To avoid confusion and double counting, these charts are updated at the conclusion of a tournament or when the player's participation has ended.

=== Singles matches ===
| Tournament | Match | Round | Opponent | Rank | Result | Score |
|---|---|---|---|---|---|---|
| Brisbane International; Brisbane, Australia; WTA 500; Hard, outdoor; 31 December 2023 – 7 January 2024 | – | 1R | Bye | | | |
| Brisbane International; Brisbane, Australia; WTA 500; Hard, outdoor; 31 December 2023 – 7 January 2024 | 1 | 2R | (Australia) Olivia Gadecki (Q) | 124 | Win | 6–4, 6–1 |
| Brisbane International; Brisbane, Australia; WTA 500; Hard, outdoor; 31 December 2023 – 7 January 2024 | 2 | 3R | (Belgium) Elise Mertens (13) | 30 | Win | 6–1, 6–0 |
| Brisbane International; Brisbane, Australia; WTA 500; Hard, outdoor; 31 December 2023 – 7 January 2024 | 3 | QF | Anastasia Potapova (Note: Russian and Belarus players are not allowed to compete under the name or flag of their country following the Russian invasion of Ukraine.) (5) | 28 | Win | 6–1, 0–0 ret |
| Brisbane International; Brisbane, Australia; WTA 500; Hard, outdoor; 31 December 2023 – 7 January 2024 | 4 | SF | (Czech Republic) Linda Nosková | 40 | Win | 6–3, 6–2 |
| Brisbane International; Brisbane, Australia; WTA 500; Hard, outdoor; 31 December 2023 – 7 January 2024 | 5 | W | Aryna Sabalenka (1) | 2 | Win (1) | 6–0, 6–3 |
| Adelaide International; Adelaide, Australia; WTA 500; Hard, outdoor; 8 January 2024 – 15 January 2024 | – | 1R | Bye | | | |
| Adelaide International; Adelaide, Australia; WTA 500; Hard, outdoor; 8 January 2024 – 15 January 2024 | 6 | 2R | (Spain) Cristina Bucșa (LL) | 64 | Win | 6–3, 7–5 |
| Adelaide International; Adelaide, Australia; WTA 500; Hard, outdoor; 8 January 2024 – 15 January 2024 | 7 | QF | Ekaterina Alexandrova | 21 | Loss | 3–6, 3–6 |
| Australian Open; Melbourne, Australia; Grand Slam; Hard, outdoor; 14 January 2024 – 28 January 2024 | 8 | 1R | (Czech Republic) Karolína Plíšková | 38 | Win | 7–6^{(8–6)}, 6–4 |
| Australian Open; Melbourne, Australia; Grand Slam; Hard, outdoor; 14 January 2024 – 28 January 2024 | 9 | 2R | Anna Blinkova | 57 | Loss | 4–6, 6–4, 6–7^{(20–22)} |
| Abu Dhabi Open; Abu Dhabi, UAE; WTA 500; Hard, outdoor; 5 February 2024–11 February 2024 | – | 1R | Bye | | | |
| Abu Dhabi Open; Abu Dhabi, UAE; WTA 500; Hard, outdoor; 5 February 2024–11 February 2024 | 10 | 2R | (United States) Danielle Collins (Q) | 124 | Win | 4–6, 6–3, 6–3 |
| Abu Dhabi Open; Abu Dhabi, UAE; WTA 500; Hard, outdoor; 5 February 2024–11 February 2024 | 11 | QF | (Spain) Cristina Bucșa (LL) | 74 | Win | 6–1, 6–4 |
| Abu Dhabi Open; Abu Dhabi, UAE; WTA 500; Hard, outdoor; 5 February 2024–11 February 2024 | 12 | SF | Liudmila Samsonova (8) | 15 | Win | 6–0, 4–6, 6–2 |
| Abu Dhabi Open; Abu Dhabi, UAE; WTA 500; Hard, outdoor; 5 February 2024–11 February 2024 | 13 | W | Daria Kasatkina (7) | 14 | Win (2) | 6–0, 6–4 |
| Qatar Open; Doha, Qatar; WTA 1000; Hard, outdoor; 11 February 2024 – 17 February 2024 | – | 1R | Bye | | | |
| Qatar Open; Doha, Qatar; WTA 1000; Hard, outdoor; 11 February 2024 – 17 February 2024 | 14 | 2R | (China) Zhu Lin | 57 | Win | 6–2, 6–1 |
| Qatar Open; Doha, Qatar; WTA 1000; Hard, outdoor; 11 February 2024 – 17 February 2024 | 15 | 3R | (United States) Emma Navarro (16) | 23 | Win | 6–1, 6–7^{(6–8)}, 6–4 |
| Qatar Open; Doha, Qatar; WTA 1000; Hard, outdoor; 11 February 2024 – 17 February 2024 | 16 | QF | (Canada) Leylah Fernandez | 38 | Win | 6–4, 6–2 |
| Qatar Open; Doha, Qatar; WTA 1000; Hard, outdoor; 11 February 2024 – 17 February 2024 | 17 | SF | Anastasia Pavlyuchenkova | 32 | Win | 6–2, 6–4 |
| Qatar Open; Doha, Qatar; WTA 1000; Hard, outdoor; 11 February 2024 – 17 February 2024 | 18 | F | (Poland) Iga Świątek (1) | 1 | Loss | 6–7^{(8–10)}, 2–6 |
| Dubai Tennis Championships; Dubai, United Arab Emirates; WTA 1000; Hard, outdoor; 18 February 2024 – 24 February 2024 | – | 1R | Bye | | | |
| Dubai Tennis Championships; Dubai, United Arab Emirates; WTA 1000; Hard, outdoor; 18 February 2024 – 24 February 2024 | 19 | 2R | Victoria Azarenka | 27 | Win | 4–6, 6–2, 0–0 ret |
| Dubai Tennis Championships; Dubai, United Arab Emirates; WTA 1000; Hard, outdoor; 18 February 2024 – 24 February 2024 | 20 | 3R | (Poland) Magdalena Fręch (Q) | 20 | Win | 7–6^{(7–5)}, 3–6, 6–4 |
| Dubai Tennis Championships; Dubai, United Arab Emirates; WTA 1000; Hard, outdoor; 18 February 2024 – 24 February 2024 | – | QF | (Italy) Jasmine Paolini | 26 | Withdrew | —N/a |
| Indian Wells Open; Indian Wells, United States; WTA 1000; Hard, outdoor; 6 March 2024 – 17 March 2024 | Withdrew | | | | | |
| Miami Open; Miami Gardens, United States; WTA 1000; Hard, outdoor; 19 March 2024 – 31 March 2024 | – | 1R | Bye | | | |
| Miami Open; Miami Gardens, United States; WTA 1000; Hard, outdoor; 19 March 2024 – 31 March 2024 | 21 | 2R | (Denmark) Clara Tauson (Q) | 91 | Win | 3–6, 7–5, 6–4 |
| Miami Open; Miami Gardens, United States; WTA 1000; Hard, outdoor; 19 March 2024 – 31 March 2024 | 22 | 3R | (United States) Taylor Townsend (Q) | 72 | Win | 6–3, 6–7^{(3–7)}, 6–4 |
| Miami Open; Miami Gardens, United States; WTA 1000; Hard, outdoor; 19 March 2024 – 31 March 2024 | 23 | 4R | (United States) Madison Keys (17) | 18 | Win | 6–3, 7–5 |
| Miami Open; Miami Gardens, United States; WTA 1000; Hard, outdoor; 19 March 2024 – 31 March 2024 | 24 | QF | (Greece) Maria Sakkari (8) | 9 | Win | 7–5, 6–7^{(4–7)}, 6–4 |
| Miami Open; Miami Gardens, United States; WTA 1000; Hard, outdoor; 19 March 2024 – 31 March 2024 | 25 | SF | Victoria Azarenka (27) | 32 | Win | 6–4, 0–6, 7–6^{(7–2)} |
| Miami Open; Miami Gardens, United States; WTA 1000; Hard, outdoor; 19 March 2024 – 31 March 2024 | 26 | F | (United States) Danielle Collins | 53 | Loss | 5–7, 3–6 |
| Stuttgart Open; Stuttgart, Germany; WTA 500; Clay, indoor; 15 April 2022 – 21 April 2024 | – | 1R | Bye | | | |
| Stuttgart Open; Stuttgart, Germany; WTA 500; Clay, indoor; 15 April 2022 – 21 April 2024 | 27 | 2R | Veronika Kudermetova | 19 | Win | 7–6^{(7–3)}, 1–6, 6–4 |
| Stuttgart Open; Stuttgart, Germany; WTA 500; Clay, indoor; 15 April 2022 – 21 April 2024 | 28 | QF | (Italy) Jasmine Paolini | 14 | Win | 6–3, 5–7, 6–3 |
| Stuttgart Open; Stuttgart, Germany; WTA 500; Clay, indoor; 15 April 2022 – 21 April 2024 | 29 | SF | (Poland) Iga Świątek (1) | 1 | Win | 6–3, 4–6, 6–3 |
| Stuttgart Open; Stuttgart, Germany; WTA 500; Clay, indoor; 15 April 2022 – 21 April 2024 | 30 | W | (Ukraine) Marta Kostyuk | 27 | Win (3) | 6–2, 6–2 |
| Madrid Open; Madrid, Spain; WTA 1000; Clay, outdoor; 23 April 2024 – 5 May 2024 | – | 1R | Bye | | | |
| Madrid Open; Madrid, Spain; WTA 1000; Clay, outdoor; 23 April 2024 – 5 May 2024 | 31 | 2R | (Italy) Lucia Bronzetti | 46 | Win | 6–4, 6–3 |
| Madrid Open; Madrid, Spain; WTA 1000; Clay, outdoor; 23 April 2024 – 5 May 2024 | 32 | 3R | (Egypt) Mayar Sherif | 72 | Win | 6–1, 6–4 |
| Madrid Open; Madrid, Spain; WTA 1000; Clay, outdoor; 23 April 2024 – 5 May 2024 | 33 | 4R | (Czech Republic) Sára Bejlek (Q) | 136 | Win | 6–1, 6–3 |
| Madrid Open; Madrid, Spain; WTA 1000; Clay, outdoor; 23 April 2024 – 5 May 2024 | 34 | QF | (Kazakhstan) Yulia Putintseva | 50 | Win | 4–6, 7–6^{(7–4)}, 7–5 |
| Madrid Open; Madrid, Spain; WTA 1000; Clay, outdoor; 23 April 2024 – 5 May 2024 | 35 | SF | Aryna Sabalenka (2) | 2 | Loss | 6–1, 5–7, 6–7^{(5–7)} |
| Italian Open; Rome, Italy; WTA 1000; Clay, outdoor; 8 May 2024 – 19 May 2024 | Withdrew | | | | | |
| French Open; Paris, France; Grand Slam; Clay, outdoor; 20 May 2024 – 9 June 2024 | 36 | 1R | (Belgium) Greet Minnen | 86 | Win | 6–2, 6–3 |
| French Open; Paris, France; Grand Slam; Clay, outdoor; 20 May 2024 – 9 June 2024 | 37 | 2R | (Netherlands) Arantxa Rus | 50 | Win | 6–4, 6–3 |
| French Open; Paris, France; Grand Slam; Clay, outdoor; 20 May 2024 – 9 June 2024 | 38 | 3R | (Belgium) Elise Mertens (25) | 27 | Win | 6–4, 6–2 |
| French Open; Paris, France; Grand Slam; Clay, outdoor; 20 May 2024 – 9 June 2024 | 39 | 4R | (Ukraine) Elina Svitolina (15) | 19 | Win | 6–4, 6–3 |
| French Open; Paris, France; Grand Slam; Clay, outdoor; 20 May 2024 – 9 June 2024 | 40 | QF | (Italy) Jasmine Paolini (12) | 15 | Loss | 2–6, 6–4, 4–6 |
| German Open; Berlin, Germany; WTA 500; Grass, outdoor; 17 June 2024 – 23 June 2024 | – | 1R | Bye | | | |
| German Open; Berlin, Germany; WTA 500; Grass, outdoor; 17 June 2024 – 23 June 2024 | 41 | 2R | Veronika Kudermetova (Q) | 35 | Win | 6–4, 7–5 |
| German Open; Berlin, Germany; WTA 500; Grass, outdoor; 17 June 2024 – 23 June 2024 | 42 | QF | Victoria Azarenka | 19 | Loss | 3–1 ret |
| Wimbledon; London, United Kingdom; Grand Slam; Grass, outdoor; 1 July 2024 – 14 July 2024 | 43 | 1R | (Romania) Elena-Gabriela Ruse (Q) | 152 | Win | 6–3, 6–1 |
| Wimbledon; London, United Kingdom; Grand Slam; Grass, outdoor; 1 July 2024 – 14 July 2024 | 44 | 2R | (Germany) Laura Siegemund | 72 | Win | 6–3, 3–6, 6–3 |
| Wimbledon; London, United Kingdom; Grand Slam; Grass, outdoor; 1 July 2024 – 14 July 2024 | 45 | 3R | (Denmark) Caroline Wozniacki (WC) | 91 | Win | 6–0, 6–1 |
| Wimbledon; London, United Kingdom; Grand Slam; Grass, outdoor; 1 July 2024 – 14 July 2024 | 46 | 4R | Anna Kalinskaya (17) | 18 | Win | 6–3, 3–0 ret |
| Wimbledon; London, United Kingdom; Grand Slam; Grass, outdoor; 1 July 2024 – 14 July 2024 | 47 | QF | (Ukraine) Elina Svitolina (21) | 21 | Win | 6–3, 6–2 |
| Wimbledon; London, United Kingdom; Grand Slam; Grass, outdoor; 1 July 2024 – 14 July 2024 | 48 | SF | (Czech Republic) Barbora Krejčíková (31) | 32 | Loss | 6–3, 3–6, 4–6 |
| Summer Olympics; Paris, France; Olympic Games; Clay, outdoor; 27 July 2024 – 4 August 2024 | Withdrew | | | | | |
| Cincinnati Open; Mason, United States; WTA 1000; Hard, outdoor; 13 August 2024 – 19 August 2024 | – | 1R | Bye | | | |
| Cincinnati Open; Mason, United States; WTA 1000; Hard, outdoor; 13 August 2024 – 19 August 2024 | 49 | 2R | (Canada) Leylah Fernandez | 26 | Loss | 6–3, 6–7^{(3–7)}, 4–6 |
| US Open; New York City, United States; Grand Slam; Hard, outdoor; 26 August 2024 – 8 September 2024 | 50 | 1R | (Australia) Destanee Aiava (Q) | 134 | Win | 6–1, 7–6^{(7–1)} |
| US Open; New York City, United States; Grand Slam; Hard, outdoor; 26 August 2024 – 8 September 2024 | – | 2R | (France) Jessika Ponchet (Q) | 143 | Withdrew | —N/a |
| WTA Finals; Riyadh, Saudi Arabia; Year-end championships; Hard, indoor; 2 November 2024 – 9 November 2024 | 51 | RR | (Italy) Jasmine Paolini (4) | 4 | Loss | 6–7^{(5–7)}, 4–6 |
| WTA Finals; Riyadh, Saudi Arabia; Year-end championships; Hard, indoor; 2 November 2024 – 9 November 2024 | 52 | RR | (China) Zheng Qinwen (7) | 7 | Loss | 6–7^{(4–7)}, 6–3, 1–6 |
| WTA Finals; Riyadh, Saudi Arabia; Year-end championships; Hard, indoor; 2 November 2024 – 9 November 2024 | 53 | RR | Aryna Sabalenka (1) | 1 | Win | 6–4, 3–6, 6–1 |

== Tournament schedule ==
Key
| W | F | SF | QF | #R | RR |

(W) winner; (F) finalist; (SF) semifinalist; (QF) quarterfinalist; (#R) rounds 4, 3, 2, 1; (RR) round-robin stage.

=== Singles schedule ===
| Date | Tournament | Location | Category | Surface | Prev. result | Prev. points | New points | Outcome |
|---|---|---|---|---|---|---|---|---|
| 31 December 2023 – 7 January 2024 | Brisbane International | Australia | WTA 500 | Hard | A | A | 500 | Winner defeated Aryna Sabalenka; 6–0, 6–3 |
| 8 January 2024 – 15 January 2024 | Adelaide International | Australia | WTA 500 | Hard | 2R | 55 | 108 | Quarterfinal lost to Ekaterina Alexandrova; 3–6, 3–6 |
| 14 January 2024– 28 January 2024 | Australian Open | Australia | Grand Slam | Hard | F | 1300 | 70 | Second round lost to Anna Blinkova; 4–6, 6–4, 6–7^{(20–22)} |
| 5 February 2024– 11 February 2024 | Abu Dhabi Open | UAE | WTA 500 | Hard | QF | 100 | 500 | Winner defeated Daria Kasatkina; 6–1, 6–4 |
| 12 February 2024– 18 February 2024 | Qatar Open | Qatar | WTA 1000 | Hard | A | A | 650 | Final lost to (Poland) Iga Świątek; 6–7^{(8–10)}, 2–6 |
| 19 February 2024– 25 February 2024 | Dubai Tennis Championships | UAE | WTA 1000 | Hard | 3R | 105 | 215 | Withdrew prior to the Quarterfinals |
| 6 March 2024 – 17 March 2024 | Indian Wells Open | United States | WTA 1000 | Hard | W | 1000 | 0 | Withdrew |
| 20 March 2024 – 31 March 2024 | Miami Open | United States | WTA 1000 | Hard | F | 650 | 650 | Final lost to (United States) Danielle Collins; 5–7, 3–6 |
| 15 April 2024 – 21 April 2024 | Stuttgart Open | Germany | WTA 500 | Clay (i) | 2R | 55 | 500 | Winner defeated (Ukraine) Marta Kostyuk; 6–2, 6–2 |
| 23 April 2024 – 5 May 2024 | Madrid Open | Spain | WTA 1000 | Clay | 2R | 10 | 390 | Semifinal lost to Aryna Sabalenka; 6–1, 5–7, 6–7^{(5–7)} |
| 8 May 2024 – 19 May 2024 | Italian Open | Italy | WTA 1000 | Clay | W | 1000 | 0 | Withdrew |
| 20 May 2024 – 9 June 2024 | French Open | France | Grand Slam | Clay | 3R | 130 | 430 | Quarterfinal lost to (Italy) Jasmine Paolini; 2–6, 6–4, 4–6 |
| 17 June 2024 – 23 June 2024 | German Open | Germany | WTA 500 | Grass | 2R | 55 | 108 | Quarterfinal lost to Victoria Azarenka; 3–1 ret |
| 1 July 2024 – 14 July 2024 | Wimbledon Championships | United Kingdom | Grand Slam | Grass | QF | 430 | 780 | Semifinal lost to (Czech Republic) Barbora Krejčíková; 6–3, 3–6, 4–6 |
| 6 August 2024 – 12 August 2024 | Canadian Open | Canada | WTA 1000 | Hard | SF | 350 | 0 | Withdrew |
| 13 August 2024 – 19 August 2024 | Cincinnati Open | United States | WTA 1000 | Hard | 3R | 105 | 10 | Second round lost to (Canada) Leylah Fernandez; 6–3, 6–7^{(3–7)}, 4–6 |
| 26 August 2024 – 8 September 2024 | US Open | United States | Grand Slam | Hard | 3R | 130 | 70 | Withdrew prior to second round |
| 25 September2024 – 6 October 2024 | China Open | China | WTA 1000 | Hard | SF | 390 | 0 | Withdrew |
| 7 October 2024 – 13 October 2024 | Wuhan Open | China | WTA 1000 | Hard | Not Held | 108 (Note: Because the tournament was not held in 2023, the points from the player's best 18th result were dropped.) | 0 | Withdrew |
| 2 Novewmber 2024 – 9 November 2024 | WTA Finals | Saudi Arabia | WTA Finals | Hard | RR | 500 | 200 | Eliminated in the round-robin stage (1 Win–2 Losses) |
| Total year-end points | | | | | | 6,473 | 5,181 | ▼1,292 (difference) |

== Yearly records ==
=== Head-to-head match-ups ===
Rybakina has a 42–11 (79%) WTA match win–loss record in the 2024 season. Her record against players who were part of the WTA rankings top ten at the time of their meetings is 4–4 (50%). Bold indicates player was ranked top 10 at the time of at least one meeting. The following list is ordered by number of wins:

- (Spain) Cristina Bucșa 2–0
- (Belgium) Elise Mertens 2–0
- Veronika Kudermetova 2–0
- (Ukraine) Elina Svitolina 2–0
- Victoria Azarenka 2–1
- **Aryna Sabalenka** 2–1
- (Australia) Olivia Gadecki 1–0
- Anastasia Potapova 1–0
- (Czech Republic) Linda Nosková 1–0
- (Czech Republic) Karolína Plíšková 1–0
- Liudmila Samsonova 1–0
- Daria Kasatkina 1–0
- (China) Zhu Lin 1–0
- (United States) Emma Navarro 1–0
- Anastasia Pavlyuchenkova 1–0
- (Poland) Magdalena Fręch 1–0
- (Denmark) Clara Tauson 1–0
- (United States) Taylor Townsend 1–0
- (United States) Madison Keys 1–0
- (Greece) **Maria Sakkari** 1–0
- (Ukraine) Marta Kostyuk 1–0
- (Italy) Lucia Bronzetti 1–0
- (Egypt) Mayar Sherif 1–0
- (Czech Republic) Sara Bejlek 1–0
- (Kazakhstan) Yulia Putintseva 1–0
- (Belgium) Greet Minnen 1–0
- (Netherlands) Arantxa Rus 1–0
- (Romania) Elena-Gabriela Ruse 1–0
- (Germany) Laura Siegemund 1–0
- (Denmark) Caroline Wozniacki 1–0
- Anna Kalinskaya 1–0
- (Australia) Destanee Aiava 1–0
- (United States) Danielle Collins 1–1
- **(Poland) Iga Świątek** 1–1
- (Canada) Leylah Fernandez 1–1
- Ekaterina Alexandrova 0–1
- Anna Blinkova 0–1
- (Czech Republic) Barbora Krejčíková 0–1
- **(China) Zheng Qinwen** 0–1
- **(Italy) Jasmine Paolini** 1–2

=== Top 10 Record ===
| Result | W–L | Player | Rk | Event | Surface | Rd | Score | Rk | Ref |
|---|---|---|---|---|---|---|---|---|---|
| Win | 1–0 | Aryna Sabalenka | 2 | Brisbane International, Australia | Hard | F | 6–0, 6–3 | 4 | |
| Loss | 1–1 | (Poland) Iga Świątek | 1 | Qatar Open, Qatar | Hard | F | 6–7^{(8–10)}, 2–6 | 4 | |
| Win | 2–1 | (Greece) Maria Sakkari | 9 | Miami Open, United States | Hard | QF | 7–5, 6–7^{(4–7)}, 6–4 | 4 | |
| Win | 3–1 | (Poland) Iga Świątek | 1 | Stuttgart Open, Germany | Clay (i) | SF | 6–3, 4–6, 6–3 | 4 | |
| Loss | 3–2 | Aryna Sabalenka | 2 | Madrid Open, Spain | Clay | SF | 6–1, 5–7, 6–7^{(5–7)} | 4 | |
| Loss | 3–3 | (Italy) Jasmine Paolini | 4 | WTA Finals, Saudi Arabia | Hard (i) | RR | 6–7^{(5–7)}, 4–6 | 5 | |
| Loss | 3–4 | (China) Zheng Qinwen | 7 | WTA Finals, Saudi Arabia | Hard (i) | RR | 6–7^{(4–7)}, 6–3, 1–6 | 5 | |
| Win | 4–4 | Aryna Sabalenka | **1** | WTA Finals, Saudi Arabia | Hard (i) | RR | 6–4, 3–6, 6–1 | 5 | |

- Key: (Rk) first use, opponent rank; (Rd) round; (Rk) 2nd use, player rank; (Ref) reference; (F) final; (SF) semifinal; (QF) quarterfinal; (#R) rounds 4, 3, 2, 1; (RR) round-robin stage; (Q#) qualifying rounds or stages (3), 2, 1.

=== Finals ===
==== Singles: 5 (3 titles, 2 runner-ups) ====
| Legend Grand Slam tournaments (0–0) WTA Tour Championships (0–0) WTA Elite Trophy (0–0) WTA 1000 (0–2) WTA 500 (3–0) WTA 250 (0–0) | Finals by surface Hard (2–2) Clay (1–0) Grass (0–0) | Finals by setting Outdoor (2–2) Indoor (1–0) |

| Result | W–L | Date | Tournament | Tier | Surface | Opponent | Score |
|---|---|---|---|---|---|---|---|
| Win | 1–0 | Jan 2024 | Brisbane International, Australia | WTA 500 | Hard | Aryna Sabalenka | 6–0, 6–3 |
| Win | 2–0 | Jan 2024 | Abu Dhabi Open, UAE | WTA 500 | Hard | Daria Kasatkina | 6–1, 6–4 |
| Loss | 2–1 | Feb 2024 | Qatar Open, Qatar | WTA 1000 | Hard | (Poland) Iga Świątek | 6–7^{(8–10)}, 2–6 |
| Loss | 2–2 | Apr 2024 | Miami Open, United States | WTA 1000 | Hard | (United States) Danielle Collins | 5–7, 3–6 |
| Win | 3–2 | Apr 2024 | Stuttgart Open, Germany | WTA 500 | Clay (i) | (Ukraine) Marta Kostyuk | 6–2, 6–2 |

=== Earnings ===
- **Bold** font denotes tournament win

**Singles**
| Event | Prize money | Year-to-date |
| **Brisbane International** | $220,000 | $220,000 |
| Adelaide International | $24,200 | $264,200 |
| Australian Open | A$180,000 | $383,250 |
| **Abu Dhabi Open** | $142,000 | $525,250 |
| Qatar Open | $308,320 | $833,570 |
| Dubai Tennis Championships | $72,965 | $886,535 |
| Miami Open | $585,000 | $1,471,535 |
| **Stuttgart Open** | $123,480 | $1,595,015 |
| Madrid Open | €284,590 | $1,879,605 |
| French Open | €415,000 | $2,294,605 |
| Berlin Ladies Open | €21,660 | $2,316,265 |
| Wimbledon Championships | €715,000 | $3,031,265 |
| Cincinnati Open | $20,650 | $3,051,915 |
| US Open | $140,000 | $3,191,915 |
| WTA Finals | $685,000 | $3,876,915 |
| | | $3,876,915 |
**Doubles**
| Event | Prize money | Year-to-date |
| | | $0 |
**Total**
| | | **$3,876,915** |

Figures in United States dollars (USD) unless noted.
