= 2024 Abu Dhabi Open – Doubles =

Doubles
- 2024 Abu Dhabi Open

Final
- Champions: (United States) Sofia Kenin (United States) Bethanie Mattek-Sands
- Runners-up: (Czech Republic) Linda Nosková (United Kingdom) Heather Watson
- Score: 6–4, 7–6^{(7–4)}

Details
- Draw: 16
- Seeds: 4

Events
Singles	Doubles
← 2023 ·	Abu Dhabi Open	· 2025 →

Sofia Kenin and Bethanie Mattek-Sands defeated Linda Nosková and Heather Watson in the final, 6–4, 7–6^{(7–4)} to win the doubles tennis title at the 2024 Abu Dhabi Open. Kenin and Mattek-Sands won the title by playing only two matches, after their quarterfinal and semifinal opponents both withdrew.

Luisa Stefani and Zhang Shuai were the reigning champions, but Zhang chose not to compete this year. Stefani partnered Beatriz Haddad Maia, but they withdrew from their semifinal match against Kenin and Mattek-Sands.

== Seeds ==
1. (United States) Nicole Melichar-Martinez / (Australia) Ellen Perez (first round)
2. (Brazil) Beatriz Haddad Maia / (Brazil) Luisa Stefani (semifinals, withdrew)
3. (Chinese Taipei) Chan Hao-ching / (Mexico) Giuliana Olmos (quarterfinals)
4. (Czech Republic) Marie Bouzková / (Spain) Sara Sorribes Tormo (quarterfinals, withdrew)

== Draw ==
=== Key ===
- Q = Qualifier
- WC = Wild card
- LL = Lucky loser
- Alt = Alternate
- SE = Special exempt
- PR = Protected ranking
- ITF = ITF entry
- JE = Junior exempt
- w/o = Walkover
- r = Retired
- d = Defaulted
- SR = Special ranking

=== Draw ===
First round
1	(United States) N Melichar-Martinez (Australia) E Perez	3	6^{3}
(Czech Republic) L Nosková (United Kingdom) H Watson	6	7^{7}
PR	(Japan) S Aoyama (Serbia) A Krunić	6	1	[10]
(Chinese Taipei) F-h Wu (China) L Zhu	2	6	[6]
3	(Chinese Taipei) H-c Chan (Mexico) G Olmos	7^{7}	6
(Ukraine) A Kalinina (China) Y Xu	6^{3}	4
WC	(Tunisia) O Jabeur (Japan) N Osaka	3	3
Alt	(Poland) M Linette (United States) B Pera	6	6
(Japan) M Kato (Indonesia) A Sutjiadi	3	4
(United States) S Kenin (United States) B Mattek-Sands	6	6
(Hungary) T Babos; V Zvonareva	7^{9}	1	[7]
4	(Czech Republic) M Bouzková (Spain) S Sorribes Tormo	6^{7}	6	[10]
(Spain) C Bucșa (Romania) M Niculescu	4	5
(United States) C Dolehide (United States) D Krawczyk	6	7
(Kazakhstan) A Danilina (Ukraine) N Kichenok	6	5	[6]
2	(Brazil) B Haddad Maia (Brazil) L Stefani	2	7	[10]

Quarterfinals
(Czech Republic) L Nosková (United Kingdom) H Watson	7^{7}	3	[10]
PR	(Japan) S Aoyama (Serbia) A Krunić	6^{2}	6	[5]
3	(Chinese Taipei) H-c Chan (Mexico) G Olmos	6^{6}	1
Alt	(Poland) M Linette (United States) B Pera	7^{8}	6
(United States) S Kenin (United States) B Mattek-Sands	w/o
4	(Czech Republic) M Bouzková (Spain) S Sorribes Tormo
(United States) C Dolehide (United States) D Krawczyk	2	2
2	(Brazil) B Haddad Maia (Brazil) L Stefani	6	6

Semifinals
(Czech Republic) L Nosková (United Kingdom) H Watson	w/o
Alt	(Poland) M Linette (United States) B Pera
(United States) S Kenin (United States) B Mattek-Sands	w/o
2	(Brazil) B Haddad Maia (Brazil) L Stefani

Final
(Czech Republic) L Nosková (United Kingdom) H Watson	4	6^{4}
(United States) S Kenin (United States) B Mattek-Sands	6	7^{7}
