= 2024 Abu Dhabi Open – Singles =

Singles
- 2024 Abu Dhabi Open

Final
- Champion: (Kazakhstan) Elena Rybakina
- Runner-up: Daria Kasatkina
- Score: 6–1, 6–4

Details
- Draw: 28
- Seeds: 8

Events
Singles	Doubles
← 2023 ·	Abu Dhabi Open	· 2025 →

Elena Rybakina defeated Daria Kasatkina in the final, 6–1, 6–4 to win the singles tennis title at the 2024 Abu Dhabi Open. It was her seventh WTA Tour-level singles title.

Belinda Bencic was the reigning champion, but did not defend her title due to pregnancy.

== Seeds ==
The top four seeds received a bye into the second round.

1. (Kazakhstan) Elena Rybakina (champion)
2. (Tunisia) Ons Jabeur (quarterfinals)
3. (Greece) Maria Sakkari (second round)
4. (Czech Republic) Barbora Krejčíková (quarterfinals)
5. (Latvia) Jeļena Ostapenko (withdrew)
6. (Brazil) Beatriz Haddad Maia (semifinals)
7. Daria Kasatkina (final)
8. Liudmila Samsonova (semifinals)
9. Veronika Kudermetova (first round)

== Draw ==
=== Key ===
- Q = Qualifier
- WC = Wild card
- LL = Lucky loser
- Alt = Alternate
- SE = Special exempt
- PR = Protected ranking
- ITF = ITF entry
- JE = Junior exempt
- w/o = Walkover
- r = Retired
- d = Defaulted
- SR = Special ranking

=== Finals ===
Semifinals
1	(Kazakhstan) Elena Rybakina	6	4	6
8	Liudmila Samsonova	0	6	2
7	Daria Kasatkina	6	4	7^{7}
6	(Brazil) Beatriz Haddad Maia	3	6	6^{2}

Final
1	(Kazakhstan) Elena Rybakina	6	6
7	Daria Kasatkina	1	4

=== Top half ===
First round
WC	(Japan) N Osaka	5	0
Q	(United States) D Collins	7	6
(China) Xin Wang	7	0	3
LL	(Spain) C Bucșa	5	6	6
Q	(United Kingdom) H Watson	6	7
9	V Kudermetova	3	5
LL	(Spain) S Sorribes Tormo	6	3	6
Q	(Czech Republic) L Nosková	3	6	3
(Ukraine) A Kalinina	6	7^{7}
LL	(Italy) L Bronzetti	1	6^{1}
(Ukraine) L Tsurenko	0	1
8	L Samsonova	6	6

Second round
1	(Kazakhstan) E Rybakina	4	6	6
Q	(United States) D Collins	6	3	3
LL	(Spain) C Bucșa	7^{7}	7
Q	(United Kingdom) H Watson	6^{1}	5
4	(Czech Republic) B Krejčíková	6	1
LL	(Spain) S Sorribes Tormo	2	0^{r}
(Ukraine) A Kalinina	1	3
8	L Samsonova	6	6

Quarterfinals
1	(Kazakhstan) E Rybakina	6	6
LL	(Spain) C Bucșa	1	4
4	(Czech Republic) B Krejčíková	5	4
8	L Samsonova	7	6

Semifinals
1	(Kazakhstan) E Rybakina	6	4	6
8	L Samsonova	0	6	2

=== Bottom half ===
First round
7	D Kasatkina	6	5	6
Q	(France) D Parry	4	7	4
Q	(United States) B Pera	2	7	3
Q	(United States) A Krueger	6	5	6
(France) C Garcia	7^{7}	4	4
(Romania) S Cîrstea	6^{4}	6	6
6	(Brazil) B Haddad Maia	6	7^{7}
WC	(China) Xiy Wang	2	6^{4}
WC	(Philippines) A Eala	6^{4}	1
(Poland) M Linette	7^{7}	6
(Czech Republic) M Bouzková	4	1
WC	(United Kingdom) E Raducanu	6	6

Second round
7	D Kasatkina	6	7
Q	(United States) A Krueger	3	5
(Romania) S Cîrstea	6	6
3	(Greece) M Sakkari	2	1
6	(Brazil) B Haddad Maia	7^{8}	6^{1}	6
(Poland) M Linette	6^{6}	7^{7}	1
WC	(United Kingdom) E Raducanu	4	1
2	(Tunisia) O Jabeur	6	6

Quarterfinals
7	D Kasatkina	6	6
(Romania) S Cîrstea	2	0
6	(Brazil) B Haddad Maia	6	6
2	(Tunisia) O Jabeur	3	4

Semifinals
7	D Kasatkina	6	4	7^{7}
6	(Brazil) B Haddad Maia	3	6	6^{2}

== Qualifying ==
=== Seeds ===
1. (Czech Republic) Linda Nosková (qualified)
2. (Czech Republic) Marie Bouzková (moved to main draw)
3. (United States) Caroline Dolehide (first round)
4. (United States) Sofia Kenin (first round)
5. (Spain) Sara Sorribes Tormo (qualifying competition, lucky loser)
6. (Italy) Lucia Bronzetti (qualifying competition, lucky loser)
7. (France) Diane Parry (qualified)
8. (United States) Danielle Collins (qualified)
9. (Kazakhstan) Yulia Putintseva (first round)
10. (Spain) Cristina Bucșa (qualifying competition, lucky loser)
11. (United States) Ashlyn Krueger (qualified)
12. (United States) Bernarda Pera (qualified)

=== Qualifiers ===
1. (Czech Republic) Linda Nosková
2. (France) Diane Parry
3. (United States) Danielle Collins
4. (United Kingdom) Heather Watson
5. (United States) Bernarda Pera
6. (United States) Ashlyn Krueger

=== Lucky losers ===
1. (Italy) Lucia Bronzetti
2. (Spain) Cristina Bucșa
3. (Spain) Sara Sorribes Tormo

=== Qualifying draw ===
==== First qualifier ====
First round
1	(Czech Republic) Linda Nosková	6	6
Alt	Vera Zvonareva	4	1
WC	(Japan) Ena Koike	6	3	2
10	(Spain) Cristina Bucșa	3	6	6

Qualifying competition
1	(Czech Republic) Linda Nosková	6	7^{7}
10	(Spain) Cristina Bucșa	4	6^{1}

==== Second qualifier ====
First round
Alt	(Serbia) Aleksandra Krunić	2	4
(Japan) Mai Hontama	6	6
(Cyprus) Raluka Șerban	1	6^{2}
7	(France) Diane Parry	6	7^{7}

Qualifying competition
(Japan) Mai Hontama	3	0
7	(France) Diane Parry	6	6

==== Third qualifier ====
First round
3	(United States) Caroline Dolehide	2	3
(Czech Republic) Linda Fruhvirtová	6	6
(Greece) Despina Papamichail	2	3
8/WC	(United States) Danielle Collins	6	6

Qualifying competition
(Czech Republic) Linda Fruhvirtová	4	3
8/WC	(United States) Danielle Collins	6	6

==== Fourth qualifier ====
First round
4	(United States) Sofia Kenin	6	1	1
(United Kingdom) Heather Watson	3	6	6
(Spain) Rebeka Masarova	6^{3}	6	6
9	(Kazakhstan) Yulia Putintseva	7^{7}	4	2

Qualifying competition
(United Kingdom) Heather Watson	3	7^{7}	6
(Spain) Rebeka Masarova	6	6^{3}	1

==== Fifth qualifier ====
First round
5	(Spain) Sara Sorribes Tormo	6	6
WC	(Saudi Arabia) Yara Alhogbani	0	1
WC	(Japan) Wakana Sonobe	4	0
12	(United States) Bernarda Pera	6	6

Qualifying competition
5	(Spain) Sara Sorribes Tormo	4	1
12	(United States) Bernarda Pera	6	6

==== Sixth qualifier ====
First round
6	(Italy) Lucia Bronzetti	6	6
(Australia) Daria Saville	4	4
Aliaksandra Sasnovich	1	6	4
11	(United States) Ashlyn Krueger	6	3	6

Qualifying competition
6	(Italy) Lucia Bronzetti	5	0
11	(United States) Ashlyn Krueger	7	6
