= 2024 Abu Dhabi Open =

- Date: 5–11 February
- Edition: 3rd
- Category: WTA 500
- Draw: 28S / 16D
- Prize money: $922,573
- Surface: Hard / outdoor
- Location: Abu Dhabi, UAE
- Venue: Zayed Sports City International Tennis Centre

Champions

Singles
- (Kazakhstan) Elena Rybakina

Doubles
- (United States) Sofia Kenin / (United States) Bethanie Mattek-Sands
- Abu Dhabi Open

The 2024 Mubadala Abu Dhabi Open was a professional women's tennis tournament played on outdoor hard courts. It was the third edition of the tournament as a WTA 500 event on the 2024 WTA Tour. It took place at the Zayed Sports City International Tennis Centre in Abu Dhabi, from 5 February until 11 February 2024. First-seeded Elena Rybakina won the singles title.

== Finals ==
=== Singles ===
- (Kazakhstan) Elena Rybakina def. Daria Kasatkina, 6–1, 6–4

=== Doubles ===
- (United States) Sofia Kenin / (United States) Bethanie Mattek-Sands def. (Czech Republic) Linda Nosková / (United Kingdom) Heather Watson, 6–4, 7–6^{(7–4)}

== Singles main-draw entrants ==
=== Seeds ===
Country	Player	Rank^{1}	Seed
KAZ	Elena Rybakina	5	1
TUN	Ons Jabeur	6	2
GRE	Maria Sakkari	9	3
CZE	Barbora Krejčiková	11	4
~~LAT~~	~~Jeļena Ostapenko~~	~~12~~	~~5~~
BRA	Beatriz Haddad Maia	13	6
	Daria Kasatkina	14	7
	Liudmila Samsonova	15	8
	Veronika Kudermetova	16	9

- ^{1} Rankings are as of 29 January 2024

=== Other entrants ===
The following players received a wildcard into the singles main draw:

- (Philippines) Alexandra Eala
- (Japan) Naomi Osaka
- (United Kingdom) Emma Raducanu
- (China) Wang Xiyu

The following player received entry using a protected ranking:

- ~~(Spain) Paula Badosa~~

The following players received entry from the qualifying draw:

- (United States) Danielle Collins
- (United States) Ashlyn Krueger
- (Czech Republic) Linda Nosková
- (France) Diane Parry
- (United States) Bernarda Pera
- (United Kingdom) Heather Watson

The following players received entry as lucky losers:

- (Italy) Lucia Bronzetti
- (Spain) Cristina Bucșa
- (Spain) Sara Sorribes Tormo

=== Withdrawals ===
- (Spain) Paula Badosa → replaced by (Italy) Lucia Bronzetti
- (United States) Emma Navarro → replaced by (China) Wang Xinyu
- (Latvia) Jeļena Ostapenko → replaced by (Spain) Sara Sorribes Tormo
- (Italy) Jasmine Paolini → replaced by (China) Zhu Lin → replaced by (Spain) Cristina Bucșa

== Doubles main-draw entrants ==
=== Seeds ===
Country	Player	Country	Player	Rank^{1}	Seed
USA	Nicole Melichar-Martinez	AUS	Ellen Perez	23	1
BRA	Beatriz Haddad Maia	BRA	Luisa Stefani	35	2
TPE	Chan Hao-ching	MEX	Giuliana Olmos	46	3
CZE	Marie Bouzková	ESP	Sara Sorribes Tormo	57	4

- Rankings are as of 29 January 2024

=== Other entrants ===
The following pair received wildcards into the doubles main draw:

- (Tunisia) Ons Jabeur / (Japan) Naomi Osaka

The following pair received entry as alternates:

- (Poland) Magda Linette / (United States) Bernarda Pera

=== Withdrawals ===
- (China) Wang Xinyu / (China) Zheng Saisai → replaced by (Poland) Magda Linette / (United States) Bernarda Pera
