= 2024 Miami Open =

- Date: March 19–31
- Edition: 39th
- Category: ATP Masters 1000 (ATP); WTA 1000 (WTA)
- Draw: 96S / 48Q / 32D
- Prize money: $8,995,555 (ATP) $8,770,480 (WTA)
- Surface: Hard - outdoor
- Location: Miami Gardens, Florida, United States
- Venue: Hard Rock Stadium

Champions

Men's singles
- (Italy) Jannik Sinner

Women's singles
- (United States) Danielle Collins

Men's doubles
- (India) Rohan Bopanna / (Australia) Matthew Ebden

Women's doubles
- (United States) Sofia Kenin / (United States) Bethanie Mattek-Sands
- Miami Open

The 2024 Miami Open was a professional hardcourt tennis tournament played from March 19 to March 31, 2024, on the grounds of Hard Rock Stadium in Miami Gardens, Florida. It was the 39th edition of the combined men's and women's event and was classified as an ATP Masters 1000 event on the 2024 ATP Tour and a WTA 1000 event on the 2024 WTA Tour.

Daniil Medvedev and Petra Kvitová were the defending champions in the men's and women's singles draw, respectively. However, Kvitová did not enter the tournament due to pregnancy. This was the third consecutive year that the reigning women's singles champion pulled out from the tournament.

== Finals ==
=== Men's singles ===
- (Italy) Jannik Sinner defeated (Bulgaria) Grigor Dimitrov, 6–3, 6–1

=== Women's singles ===
- (United States) Danielle Collins defeated (Kazakhstan) Elena Rybakina, 7–5, 6–3

=== Men's doubles ===
- (India) Rohan Bopanna / (Australia) Matthew Ebden defeated (Croatia) Ivan Dodig / (United States) Austin Krajicek, 6–7^{(3–7)}, 6–3, [10–6].

=== Women's doubles ===
- (United States) Sofia Kenin / (United States) Bethanie Mattek-Sands defeated (Canada) Gabriela Dabrowski / (New Zealand) Erin Routliffe, 4–6, 7–6^{(7–5)}, [11–9]

== Points and prize money ==
=== Point distribution ===
Event	W	F	SF	QF	R16	R32	R64	R128	Q	Q2	Q1
Men's singles	1000	650	400	200	100	50	30*	10	20	10	0
Men's doubles	1000	600	360	180	90	0	—N/a	—N/a	—N/a	—N/a	—N/a
Women's singles	1000	650	390	215	120	65	35*	10	30	20	2
Women's doubles	1000	650	390	215	120	10	—N/a	—N/a	—N/a	—N/a	—N/a

* Players with byes receive first-round points.

=== Prize money ===
Event	W	F	SF	QF	R16	R32	R64	R128	Q2	Q1
Men's singles	$1,100,000	$585,000	$325,000	$185,000	$101,000	$59,100	$34,500	$23,250	$14,400	$7,800
Women's singles	$1,100,000	$585,000	$325,000	$185,000	$101,000	$59,100	$34,500	$23,250	$14,400	$7,800
Men's doubles*	$447,300	$236,800	$127,170	$63,600	$34,100	$18,640	—N/a	—N/a	—N/a	—N/a
Women's doubles*	$447,300	$236,800	$127,170	$63,600	$34,100	$18,640	—N/a	—N/a	—N/a	—N/a

*per team

== See also ==
- 2024 ATP Tour
- ATP Tour Masters 1000
- List of ATP Tour top-level tournament singles champions
- Tennis Masters Series records and statistics
- 2024 WTA Tour
- WTA 1000 tournaments
- WTA Premier Mandatory/5
- List of WTA Tour top-level tournament singles champions
