= 2024 Qatar TotalEnergies Open =

- Date: 11–17 February 2024
- Edition: 22nd
- Category: WTA 1000
- Draw: 56S / 28D
- Prize money: $3,211,715
- Surface: Hard / outdoor
- Location: Doha, Qatar
- Venue: Khalifa International Tennis and Squash Complex

Champions

Singles
- (Poland) Iga Świątek

Doubles
- (Netherlands) Demi Schuurs / (Brazil) Luisa Stefani
← 2023 ·	WTA Qatar Open	· 2025 →

The 2024 Qatar TotalEnergies Open was a professional women's tennis tournament played on outdoor hard courts. It was the 22nd edition of the WTA Qatar Open, and a WTA 1000 tournament on the 2024 WTA Tour. It took place at the International Tennis and Squash complex in Doha, Qatar, from 11 to 17 February 2024.

== Finals ==
=== Singles ===
- (Poland) Iga Świątek def. (Kazakhstan) Elena Rybakina 7–6^{(10–8)}, 6–2

=== Doubles ===
- (Netherlands) Demi Schuurs / (Brazil) Luisa Stefani def. (United States) Caroline Dolehide / (United States) Desirae Krawczyk, 6–4, 6–2

== Point distribution ==
Event	W	F	SF	QF	Round of 16	Round of 32	Round of 64	Q	Q2	Q1
Singles	1000	650	390	215	120	65	10	30	20	2
Doubles	1000	650	390	215	120	10	—	—	—	—

== Singles main-draw entrants ==
=== Seeds ===
Country	Player	Rank^{1}	Seed
POL	Iga Świątek	1	1
USA	Coco Gauff	3	2
KAZ	Elena Rybakina	5	3
TUN	Ons Jabeur	6	4
CHN	Zheng Qinwen	7	5
CZE	Markéta Vondroušová	8	6
GRE	Maria Sakkari	9	7
LAT	Jeļena Ostapenko	11	8
~~CZE~~	~~Barbora Krejčíková~~	~~12~~	~~9~~
BRA	Beatriz Haddad Maia	13	10
	Daria Kasatkina	14	11
	Liudmila Samsonova	15	12
	Veronika Kudermetova	16	13
	Ekaterina Alexandrova	19	14
FRA	Caroline Garcia	21	15
USA	Emma Navarro	23	16

- ^{1} Rankings are as of 5 February 2024

=== Other entrants ===
The following players received a wildcard into the singles main draw:

- (Spain) Paula Badosa
- Anna Kalinskaya
- (United Kingdom) Emma Raducanu
- (Turkey) Zeynep Sönmez

The following player received entry using a protected ranking:

- (Japan) Naomi Osaka

The following players received entry from the qualifying draw:

- Erika Andreeva
- (United States) Danielle Collins
- (Poland) Magdalena Fręch
- (Japan) Nao Hibino
- (United States) Ashlyn Krueger
- (Belgium) Greet Minnen
- (United States) Bernarda Pera
- Diana Shnaider

The following players received entry as lucky losers:

- (Bulgaria) Viktoriya Tomova
- (Italy) Martina Trevisan

=== Withdrawals ===
- (Czech Republic) Barbora Krejčíková → replaced by (Italy) Martina Trevisan
- (Czech Republic) Karolína Muchová → replaced by (Czech Republic) Linda Nosková
- (United States) Jessica Pegula → replaced by (Czech Republic) Kateřina Siniaková
- Aryna Sabalenka → replaced by (United States) Peyton Stearns
- (Ukraine) Elina Svitolina → replaced by (Bulgaria) Viktoriya Tomova

== Doubles main-draw entrants ==
=== Seeds ===
Country	Player	Country	Player	Rank^{1}	Seed
TPE	Hsieh Su-wei	BEL	Elise Mertens	3	1
CAN	Gabriela Dabrowski	NZL	Erin Routliffe	11	2
USA	Nicole Melichar-Martinez	AUS	Ellen Perez	23	3
~~CZE~~	~~Barbora Krejčíková~~	~~GER~~	~~Laura Siegemund~~	~~29~~	~~4~~
NED	Demi Schuurs	BRA	Luisa Stefani	29	5
UKR	Lyudmyla Kichenok	LAT	Jeļena Ostapenko	33	6
AUS	Storm Hunter	USA	Alycia Parks	35	7
TPE	Chan Hao-ching	MEX	Giuliana Olmos	46	8

- Rankings are as of 5 February 2024

=== Other entrants ===
The following pair received a wildcard into the doubles main draw:

- (Qatar) Mubaraka Al-Naimi / (Turkey) İpek Öz

The following pair received entry as alternates:

- (Slovakia) Tereza Mihalíková / (Czech Republic) Linda Nosková

=== Withdrawals ===
- (Czech Republic) Barbora Krejčíková / (Germany) Laura Siegemund → replaced by (Slovakia) Tereza Mihalíková / (Czech Republic) Linda Nosková
