= 2024 Porsche Tennis Grand Prix =

Women's tennis tournament

- Date: 15–21 April
- Edition: 46th
- Category: WTA 500
- Draw: 28S / 16D
- Prize money: $922,573
- Surface: Clay (indoor)
- Location: Stuttgart, Germany
- Venue: Porsche-Arena

Champions

Singles
- (Kazakhstan) Elena Rybakina

Doubles
- (Chinese Taipei) Chan Hao-ching / Veronika Kudermetova
- Porsche Tennis Grand Prix

The 2024 Porsche Tennis Grand Prix was a women's professional tennis tournament played on indoor clay courts at the Porsche Arena in Stuttgart, Germany, from 15 April until 21 April 2024. It was the 46th edition of the Porsche Tennis Grand Prix and was classified as a WTA 500 tournament on the 2024 WTA Tour.

== Finals ==
=== Singles ===
- (Kazakhstan) Elena Rybakina defeated (Ukraine) Marta Kostyuk, 6–2, 6–2

=== Doubles ===
- (Chinese Taipei) Chan Hao-ching / Veronika Kudermetova defeated (Norway) Ulrikke Eikeri / (Estonia) Ingrid Neel, 4–6, 6–3, [10–2]

== Point distribution ==
Event	W	F	SF	QF	R16	R32	Q	Q2	Q1
Singles	500	325	195	108	60	1	25	13	1
Doubles	500	325	195	108	1	—N/a	—N/a	—N/a	—N/a

== Singles main draw entrants ==
=== Seeds ===
Country	Player	Rank	Seed
POL	Iga Świątek	1	1
	Aryna Sabalenka	2	2
USA	Coco Gauff	3	3
KAZ	Elena Rybakina	4	4
CHN	Zheng Qinwen	7	5
CZE	Markéta Vondroušová	8	6
TUN	Ons Jabeur	9	7
LAT	Jeļena Ostapenko	10	8

- Rankings are as of 8 April 2024.

=== Other entrants ===
The following players received wildcards into the main draw:

- (Germany) Angelique Kerber
- (Germany) Tatjana Maria
- (United Kingdom) Emma Raducanu
- (Germany) Laura Siegemund

The following player received entry using a protected ranking:

- (Spain) Paula Badosa

The following players received entry from the qualifying draw:

- (Italy) Sara Errani
- Aliaksandra Sasnovich
- Diana Shnaider
- (United States) Sachia Vickery

=== Withdrawals ===
- (United States) Emma Navarro → replaced by (Spain) Paula Badosa
- (United States) Jessica Pegula → replaced by (Croatia) Donna Vekić

== Doubles main draw entrants ==
Country	Player	Country	Player	Rank	Seed
USA	Desirae Krawczyk	NED	Demi Schuurs	24	1
CZE	Barbora Krejčiková	GER	Laura Siegemund	40	2
JPN	Shuko Aoyama	UKR	Nadiia Kichenok	62	3
USA	Asia Muhammad	INA	Aldila Sutjiadi	68	4

- Rankings as of 8 April 2024.

=== Other entrants ===
The following pair received a wildcard into the doubles main draw:

- (Germany) Nastasja Schunk / (Germany) Ella Seidel
