= 2024 Italian Open (tennis) =

- Date: 8–19 May 2024
- Edition: 81st
- Category: ATP 1000 (men); WTA 1000 (women)
- Draw: 96S / 32D
- Prize money: €7,877,020 (men) $5,509,771 (women)
- Surface: Clay / outdoor
- Location: Rome, Italy
- Venue: Foro Italico

Champions

Men's singles
- (Germany) Alexander Zverev

Women's singles
- (Poland) Iga Świątek

Men's doubles
- (Spain) Marcel Granollers / (Argentina) Horacio Zeballos

Women's doubles
- (Italy) Sara Errani / (Italy) Jasmine Paolini
← 2023 ·	Italian Open	· 2025 →

The 2024 Italian Open (also known as the Internazionali BNL d'Italia for sponsorship reasons) was a professional tennis tournament played on outdoor clay courts at the Foro Italico in Rome, Italy. It was the 81st edition of the Italian Open and is classified as an ATP 1000 event on the 2024 ATP Tour and a WTA 1000 event on the 2024 WTA Tour. Third-seeded Alexander Zverev and first-seeded Iga Świątek won the singles titles.

== Finals ==
=== Men's singles ===
- (Germany) Alexander Zverev defeated (Chile) Nicolás Jarry, 6–4, 7–5

=== Women's singles ===
- (Poland) Iga Świątek defeated Aryna Sabalenka, 6–2, 6–3

=== Men's doubles ===
- (Spain) Marcel Granollers / (Argentina) Horacio Zeballos defeated (El Salvador) Marcelo Arévalo / (Croatia) Mate Pavić, 6–2, 6–2

=== Women's doubles ===
- (Italy) Sara Errani / (Italy) Jasmine Paolini defeated (United States) Coco Gauff / (New Zealand) Erin Routliffe, 6–3, 4–6, [10–8]

== Point distribution ==
Event	W	F	SF	QF	R16	R32	R64	R128	Q	Q2	Q1
Men's singles	1000	650	400	200	100	50	30*	10	20	10	0
Men's doubles	1000	600	360	180	90	0	—	—	—	—	—
Women's singles	1000	650	390	215	120	65	35*	10	30	20	2
Women's doubles	1000	650	390	215	120	10	—	—	—	—	—

* Players with byes receive first-round points.

=== Prize money ===
Event	W	F	SF	QF	R16	R32	R64	R128	Q2	Q1
Men's singles	€963,225	€512,260	€284,590	€161,995	€88,440	€51,665	€30,255	€20,360	€11,820	€6,130
Women's singles	€699,690	€365,015	€192,405	€99,160	€52,480	€30,435	€16,595	€10,495	€8,030	€4,175
Men's doubles*	€391,680	€207,360	€111,360	€55,690	€29,860	€16,320	—	—	—	
Women's doubles*	€244,310	€129,320	€69,460	€34,740	€18,560	€10,180	—	—	—	—

_{*per team}
