= 2024 Porsche Tennis Grand Prix – Singles =

Singles
- 2024 Porsche Tennis Grand Prix

Final
- Champion: (Kazakhstan) Elena Rybakina
- Runner-up: (Ukraine) Marta Kostyuk
- Score: 6–2, 6–2

Details
- Draw: 28 (4WC, 4Q)
- Seeds: 8

Events
Singles	Doubles
← 2023 ·	Porsche Tennis Grand Prix	· 2025 →

Elena Rybakina defeated Marta Kostyuk in the final, 6–2, 6–2 to win the singles tennis title at the 2024 Stuttgart Open. It was her eighth career WTA Tour title.

Iga Świątek was the two-time defending champion, but lost to Rybakina in the semifinals. The loss ended Świątek's 10-match unbeaten streak at the tournament.

Six of the eight quarterfinalists were major champions, including all four reigning major champions (Świątek, Aryna Sabalenka, Coco Gauff and Markéta Vondroušová).

== Seeds ==
The top four seeds received a bye into the second round.

1. (Poland) Iga Świątek (semifinals)
2. Aryna Sabalenka (quarterfinals)
3. (United States) Coco Gauff (quarterfinals)
4. (Kazakhstan) Elena Rybakina (champion)
5. (China) Zheng Qinwen (second round)
6. (Czech Republic) Markéta Vondroušová (semifinals)
7. (Tunisia) Ons Jabeur (second round)
8. (Latvia) Jeļena Ostapenko (first round)

== Draw ==
=== Key ===
- Q = Qualifier
- WC = Wild card
- LL = Lucky loser
- Alt = Alternate
- SE = Special exempt
- PR = Protected ranking
- ITF = ITF entry
- JE = Junior exempt
- w/o = Walkover
- r = Retired
- d = Defaulted
- SR = Special ranking

=== Finals ===
Semifinals
1	(Poland) Iga Świątek	3	6	3
4	(Kazakhstan) Elena Rybakina	6	4	6
(Ukraine) Marta Kostyuk	7^{7}	6
6	(Czech Republic) Markéta Vondroušová	6^{2}	2

Final
4	(Kazakhstan) Elena Rybakina	6	6
(Ukraine) Marta Kostyuk	2	2

=== Top half ===
First round
WC	(Germany) T Maria	1	6	0
(Belgium) E Mertens	6	4	6
WC	(Germany) A Kerber	2	1
WC	(United Kingdom) E Raducanu	6	6
(Czech Republic) L Nosková	6	6
8	(Latvia) J Ostapenko	3	1
V Kudermetova	5	6	6
(Czech Republic) B Krejčíková	7	4	4
(Italy) J Paolini	6	6
Q	(Italy) S Errani	1	0
E Alexandrova	6	3	6^{1}
7	(Tunisia) O Jabeur	2	6	7^{7}

Second round
1	(Poland) I Świątek	6	6
(Belgium) E Mertens	3	4
WC	(United Kingdom) E Raducanu	6	7
(Czech Republic) L Nosková	0	5
4	(Kazakhstan) E Rybakina	7^{7}	1	6
V Kudermetova	6^{3}	6	4
(Italy) J Paolini	7^{10}	6
7	(Tunisia) O Jabeur	6^{8}	4

Quarterfinals
1	(Poland) I Świątek	7^{7}	6
WC	(United Kingdom) E Raducanu	6^{2}	3
4	(Kazakhstan) E Rybakina	6	5	6
(Italy) J Paolini	3	7	3

Semifinals
1	(Poland) I Świątek	3	6	3
4	(Kazakhstan) E Rybakina	6	4	6

=== Bottom half ===
First round
5	(China) Q Zheng	6	6
(Romania) S Cîrstea	2	3
(Ukraine) M Kostyuk	6	6^{4}	6
WC	(Germany) L Siegemund	3	7^{7}	4
Q	(United States) S Vickery	7^{7}	7
Q	A Sasnovich	6^{2}	5
6	(Czech Republic) M Vondroušová	6	6
(Croatia) D Vekić	4	3
L Samsonova	4	6	3
A Potapova	6	4	6
Q	D Shnaider	3	4
PR	(Spain) P Badosa	6	6

Second round
5	(China) Q Zheng	2	6	5
(Ukraine) M Kostyuk	6	4	7
Q	(United States) S Vickery	3	6	5
3	(United States) C Gauff	6	4	7
6	(Czech Republic) M Vondroušová	7^{7}	6
A Potapova	6^{5}	1
PR	(Spain) P Badosa	6^{4}	6	3^{r}
2	A Sabalenka	7^{7}	4	3

Quarterfinals
(Ukraine) M Kostyuk	3	6	7^{8}
3	(United States) C Gauff	6	4	6^{6}
6	(Czech Republic) M Vondroušová	3	6	7
2	A Sabalenka	6	3	5

Semifinals
(Ukraine) M Kostyuk	7^{7}	6
6	(Czech Republic) M Vondroušová	6^{2}	2

== Qualifying ==
=== Seeds ===
1. Anna Kalinskaya (qualifying competition)
2. Diana Shnaider (qualified)
3. (Belgium) Greet Minnen (qualifying competition)
4. (France) Océane Dodin (qualifying competition)
5. (Italy) Sara Errani (qualified)
6. Aliaksandra Sasnovich (qualified)
7. (United States) Sachia Vickery (qualified)
8. (Czech Republic) Sára Bejlek (qualifying competition)

=== Qualifiers ===
1. (Italy) Sara Errani
2. Diana Shnaider
3. (United States) Sachia Vickery
4. Aliaksandra Sasnovich

=== Qualifying draw ===
==== First qualifier ====
First round
1	Anna Kalinskaya	6	6
WC	(Germany) Carolina Kuhl	1	2
(Liechtenstein) Kathinka von Deichmann	2	3
5	(Italy) Sara Errani	6	6

Qualifying competition
1	Anna Kalinskaya	6^{8}	6	2
5	(Italy) Sara Errani	7^{10}	3	6

==== Second qualifier ====
First round
2	Diana Shnaider	6	6
Vera Zvonareva	3	2
(Cyprus) Raluka Șerban	1	1
8	(Czech Republic) Sára Bejlek	6	6

Qualifying competition
2	Diana Shnaider	0	6	6
8	(Czech Republic) Sára Bejlek	6	4	1

==== Third qualifier ====
First round
3	(Belgium) Greet Minnen	6	6
(Australia) Olivia Gadecki	3	3
WC	(Germany) Nastasja Schunk	2	3
7	(United States) Sachia Vickery	6	6

Qualifying competition
3	(Belgium) Greet Minnen	6^{2}	3
7	(United States) Sachia Vickery	7^{7}	6

==== Fourth qualifier ====
First round
4	(France) Océane Dodin	6	6
(Germany) Ella Seidel	4	1
(Croatia) Jana Fett	4	6^{4}
6	Aliaksandra Sasnovich	6	7^{7}

Qualifying competition
4	(France) Océane Dodin	2	6	4
6	Aliaksandra Sasnovich	6	3	6
