= 2024 Mutua Madrid Open =

- Date: 23 April − 5 May
- Edition: 22nd (men); 15th (women)
- Category: ATP Tour Masters 1000 (men); WTA 1000 (women)
- Draw: 96S / 32D
- Prize money: €7,877,020
- Surface: Clay / outdoor
- Location: Madrid, Spain
- Venue: Park Manzanares

Champions

Men's singles
- Andrey Rublev

Women's singles
- (Poland) Iga Świątek

Men's doubles
- (United States) Sebastian Korda / (Australia) Jordan Thompson

Women's doubles
- (Spain) Cristina Bucșa / (Spain) Sara Sorribes Tormo
- Madrid Open

The 2024 Mutua Madrid Open was a professional tennis tournament played on outdoor clay courts at the Park Manzanares in Madrid, Spain from 23 April to 5 May 2024. It was the 22nd edition of the event on the ATP Tour and 15th on the WTA Tour. It was classified as an ATP Tour Masters 1000 event on the 2024 ATP Tour and a WTA 1000 event on the 2024 WTA Tour. The Tournament paid tribute to the five time and most successful champion in the men's side Rafael Nadal, on his last appearance at the tournament.

== Champions ==
=== Men's singles ===
- Andrey Rublev def. (Canada) Félix Auger-Aliassime, 4–6, 7–5, 7–5

=== Women's singles ===
- (Poland) Iga Świątek def. Aryna Sabalenka, 7–5, 4–6, 7–6^{(9–7)}

This was Świątek's third title of the year, and 20th of her career.

=== Men's doubles ===
- (United States) Sebastian Korda / (Australia) Jordan Thompson def. (Uruguay) Ariel Behar / (Czech Republic) Adam Pavlásek, 6–3, 7–6^{(9–7)}

=== Women's doubles ===
- (Spain) Cristina Bucșa / (Spain) Sara Sorribes Tormo def. (Czech Republic) Barbora Krejčíková / (Germany) Laura Siegemund 6–0, 6–2

== Points and prize money ==
=== Point distribution ===
| Event | W | F | SF | QF | R16 | R32 | R64 | R128 | Q | Q2 | Q1 |
| Men's singles | 1000 | 650 | 400 | 200 | 100 | 50 | 30* | 10 | 20 | 10 | 0 |
| Men's doubles | 1000 | 600 | 360 | 180 | 90 | 0 | —N/a | —N/a | —N/a | —N/a | —N/a |
| Women's singles | 1000 | 650 | 390 | 215 | 120 | 65 | 35* | 10 | 30 | 20 | 2 |
| Women's doubles | 1000 | 650 | 390 | 215 | 120 | 10 | —N/a | —N/a | —N/a | —N/a | —N/a |

* Players with byes receive first-round points.

=== Prize money ===
| Event | W | F | SF | QF | R16 | R32 | R64 | R128 | Q2 | Q1 |
| Men's singles | €963,225 | €512,260 | €284,590 | €161,995 | €88,440 | €51,665 | €30,255 | €20,360 | €11,820 | €6,130 |
| Women's singles | €963,225 | €512,260 | €284,590 | €161,995 | €88,440 | €51,665 | €30,255 | €20,360 | €11,820 | €6,130 |
| Men's doubles* | €391,680 | €207,360 | €111,360 | €55,690 | €29,860 | €16,320 | —N/a | —N/a | —N/a | —N/a |
| Women's doubles* | €391,680 | €207,360 | €111,360 | €55,690 | €29,860 | €16,320 | —N/a | —N/a | —N/a | —N/a |

*per team
