= 2024 WTA Finals =

- Date: 2 – 9 November
- Edition: 53rd (singles) / 48th (doubles)
- Draw: 8S / 8D
- Prize money: $15.25M
- Surface: Hard (indoor)
- Location: Riyadh, Saudi Arabia
- Venue: King Saud University Indoor Arena

Champions

Singles
- (United States) Coco Gauff

Doubles
- (Canada) Gabriela Dabrowski / (New Zealand) Erin Routliffe
← 2023 ·	WTA Finals	· 2025 →

The 2024 WTA Finals was the professional women's year-end championship tennis tournament run by the Women's Tennis Association (WTA). It was the 53rd edition of the singles event and the 48th edition of the doubles competition and took place between 2 and 9 November. The tournament was contested by the eight highest-ranked singles players and doubles teams of the 2024 WTA Tour. It took place in Riyadh, Saudi Arabia, marking its return to Asia for the first time since 2019, and the fifth consecutive finals to be held in a different city (Shenzhen in 2019, Guadalajara in 2021, Fort Worth in 2022, and Cancún in 2023). This was the first time that Saudi Arabia hosted the tournament.

== Champions ==
=== Singles ===
- (United States) Coco Gauff def. (China) Zheng Qinwen, 3–6, 6–4, 7–6^{(7–2)}

=== Doubles ===
- (Canada) Gabriela Dabrowski / (New Zealand) Erin Routliffe def. (Czech Republic) Kateřina Siniaková / (United States) Taylor Townsend, 7–5, 6–3

== Tournament ==
=== Qualifying ===
Eight players/teams to compete in singles/doubles. To qualify, players/teams have to play a minimum of eight WTA 1000 or WTA 500 tournaments during the season. Players/teams are qualified in the following sequence:

1. Ranked top seven in the leaderboard;
2. The highest-ranked current-year Grand Slam winning player/team ranked from eighth to twentieth;
3. The second-highest-ranked current-year Grand Slam winning player/team ranked from eighth to twentieth, if one player/team ranked in the top seven withdraws;
4. The next player who is ranked eighth or below.

In the singles, point totals are calculated by combining point totals from eighteen tournaments (excluding ITF and WTA 125 tournaments). Of these eighteen tournaments, a player's results from the following events are included:

- The four Grand Slam events;
- Six best mandatory WTA 1000 tournaments from the following seven events: Indian Wells, Miami, Madrid, Rome, Toronto/Montreal, Cincinnati and Beijing;
- The best mandatory WTA 1000 tournament from the following three events: Doha, Dubai and Wuhan;
- (for the players who played the main draw of least two such tournaments) the best seven results from any other mandatory WTA 1000, WTA 500 and WTA 250 tournaments.

In the doubles, point totals are calculated by any combination of twelve tournaments throughout the year. Unlike in the singles, this combination does not need to include results from the Grand Slams or WTA 1000 tournaments.

=== Format ===
Both the singles and doubles event features eight players/teams in a round-robin event, split into two groups of four.

Over the first six days of competition, each player/team meets the other three players/teams in her group, with the top two in each group advancing to the semifinals. The first-placed player/team in one group meets the second-placed player/team in the other group, and vice versa. The winners of each semifinal meet in the championship match.

=== Round robin tie-breaking methods ===
The final standings are made using these methods:

1. Greatest number of match wins
2. Greatest number of matches played
3. Head-to-head results if only two players are tied, or if three players are tied then:

a. If three players each have the same number of wins, a player having played less than all three matches is automatically eliminated and the player advancing to the single-elimination competition is the winner of the match-up of the two remaining tied players.
b. Highest percentage of sets won
c. Highest percentage of games won

== Prize money and points ==
The total prize money for the 2024 WTA Finals is US$15,250,000, an increase of 69.44% compared to the 2023 edition. The tables below break down the prize money, participation fees are prorated on a per match basis.

Stage	Prize money		Points
Stage	Singles	Doubles (Note: Prize money for doubles is per team.)	Points
Champion	RR (Note: RR means prize money or points won in the round-robin round.) + $3,770,000	RR + $775,000	RR + 900
Runner-up	RR + $1,270,000	RR + $255,000	RR + 400
Round robin win per match	+$350,000	+$70,000	200
Participation Fee	$335,000	$140,000	—
Alternates	$250,000	$106,000	—

- An undefeated champion would earn the maximum 1,500 points and $5,155,000 in singles or $1,125,000 in doubles.
- Participation fees are prorated on a per match basis. Singles: 1 match = $225,000 2 matches = $275,000 and 3 matches = $335,000. Doubles: 1 match = $94,000 2 matches = $116,000 and 3 matches = $140,000.
- Alternate fees are also prorated on a per-match basis. Singles: 0 matches = $140,000, 1 match = $200,000, 2 matches = $250,000. Doubles: 0 matches= $60,000, 1 match = $84,000, 2 matches= $106,000

== Qualified players ==
=== Singles ===
#	Players	Date qualified
1	Aryna Sabalenka	5 September
2	(Poland) Iga Świątek	6 August
3	(United States) Coco Gauff	14 October
4	(Italy) Jasmine Paolini	14 October
5	(Kazakhstan) Elena Rybakina	14 October
6	(United States) Jessica Pegula	14 October
7	(China) Zheng Qinwen	16 October
8	(Czech Republic) Barbora Krejčíková	16 October

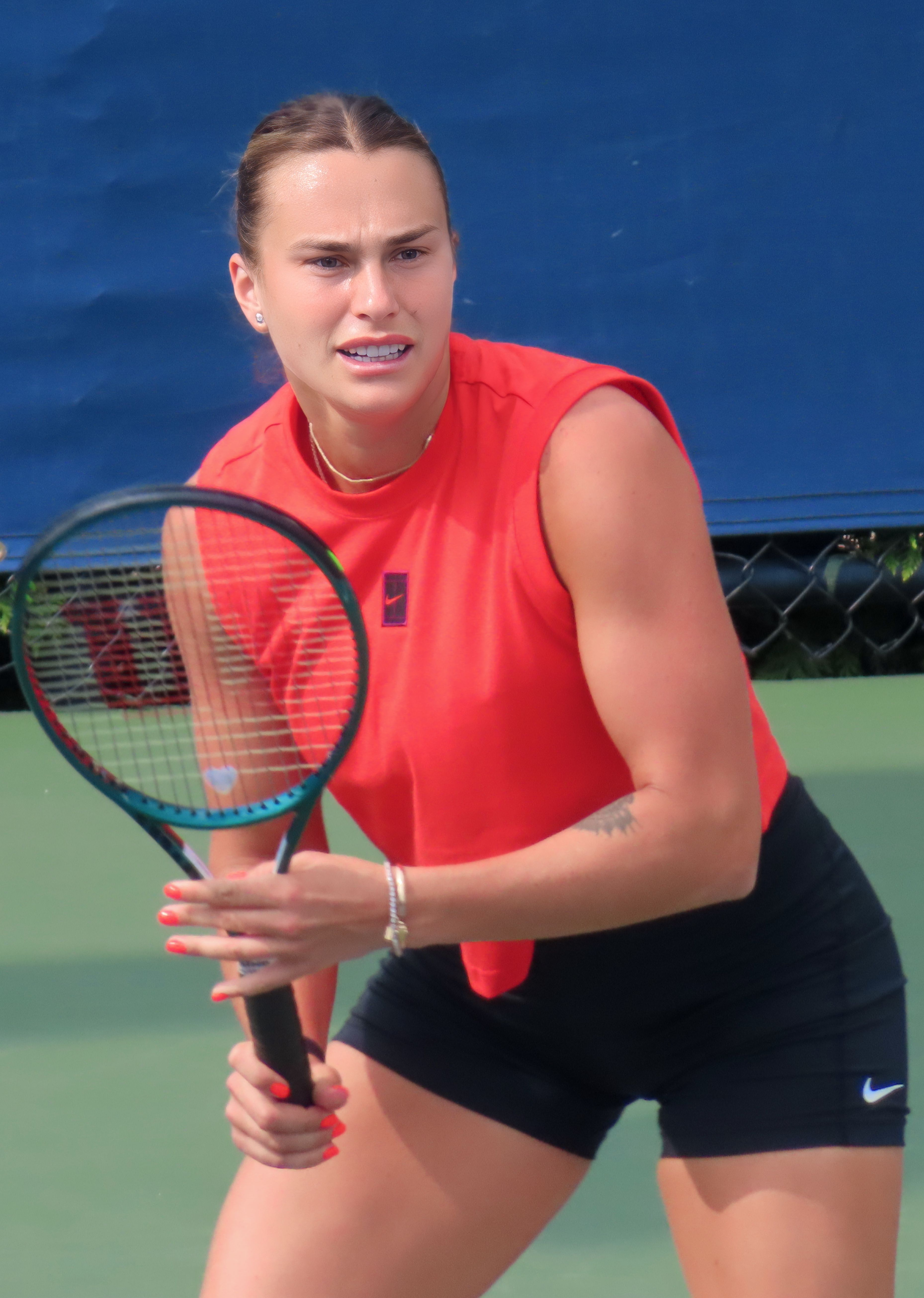
Sabalenka

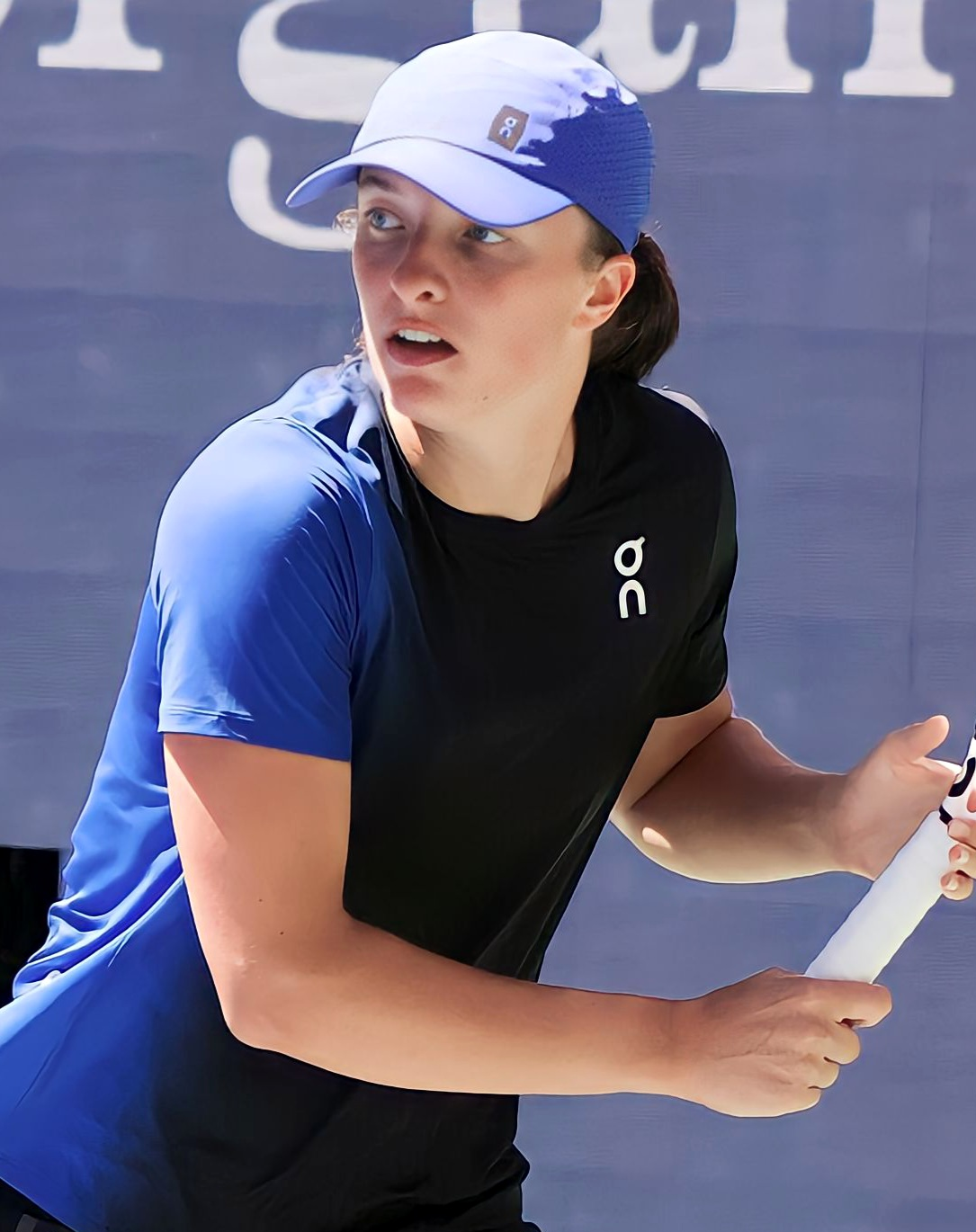
Świątek

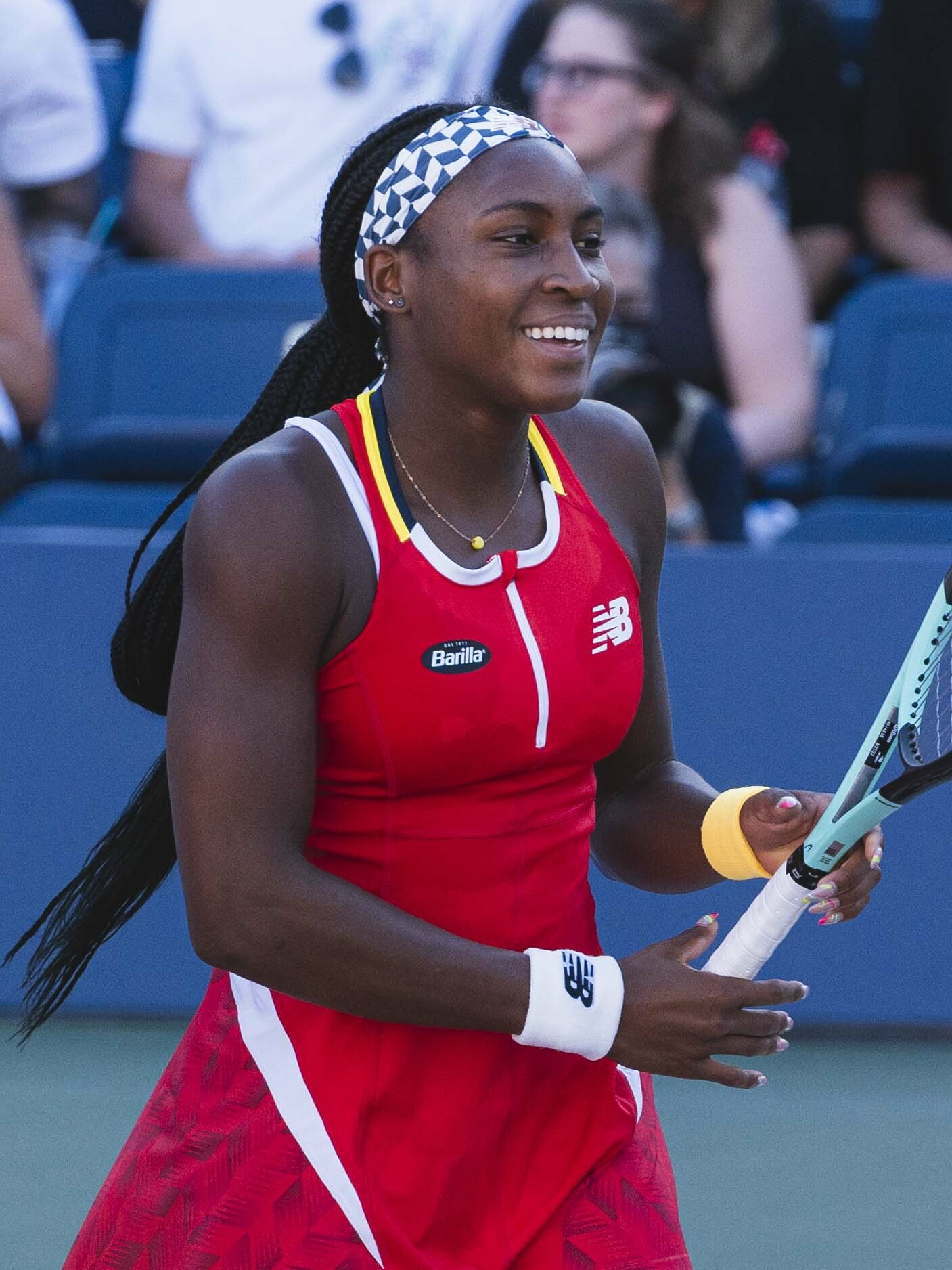
Gauff

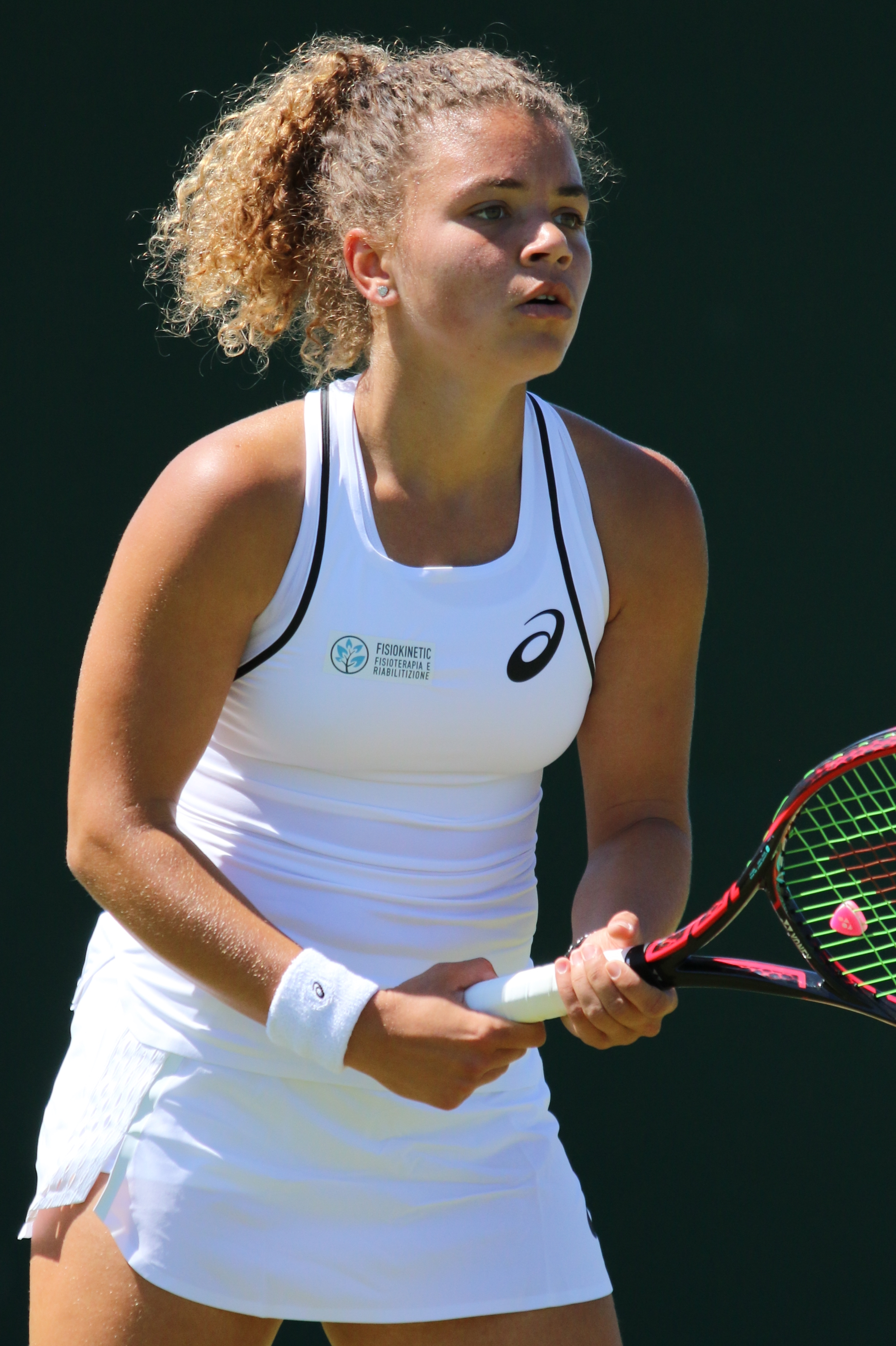
Paolini

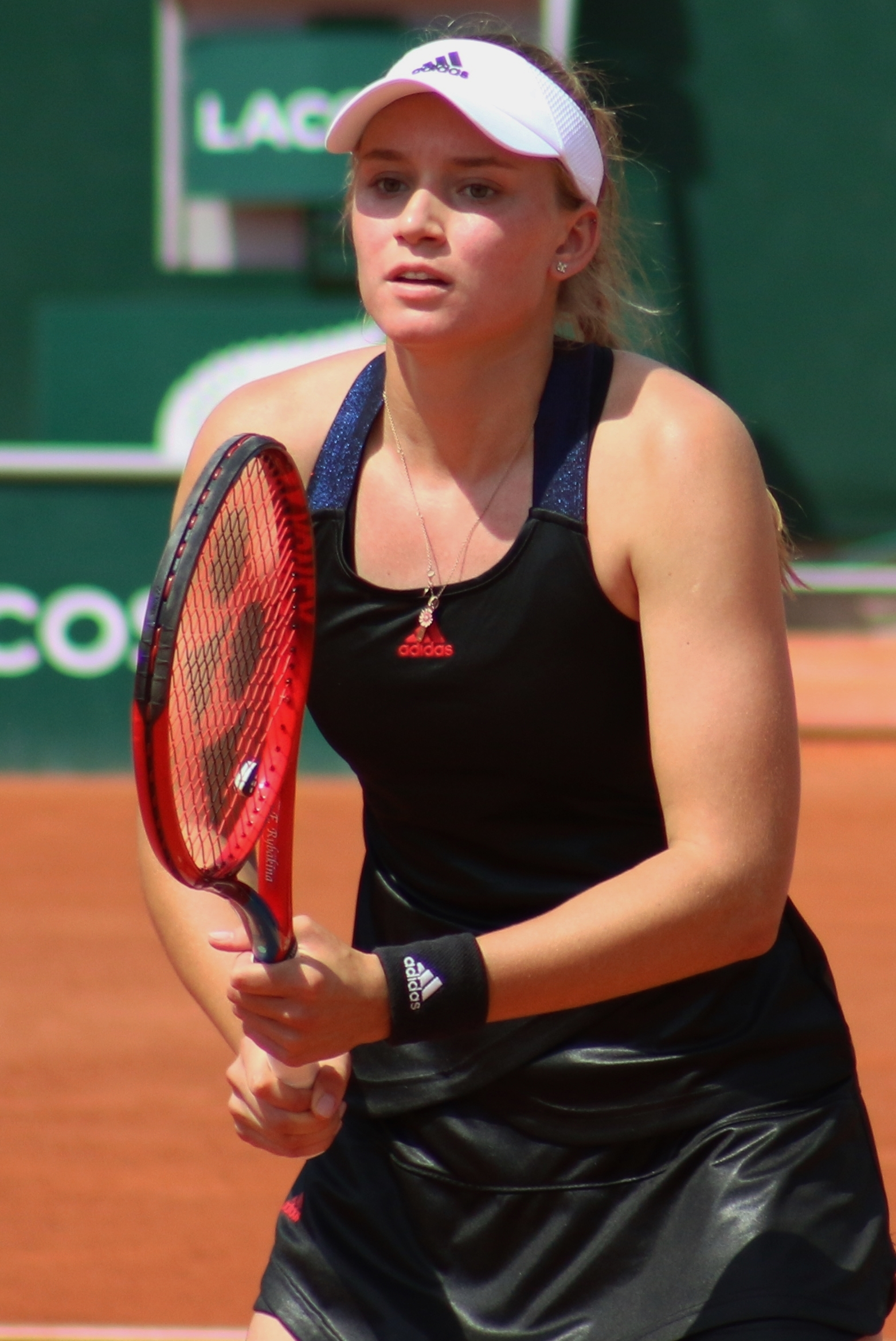
Rybakina

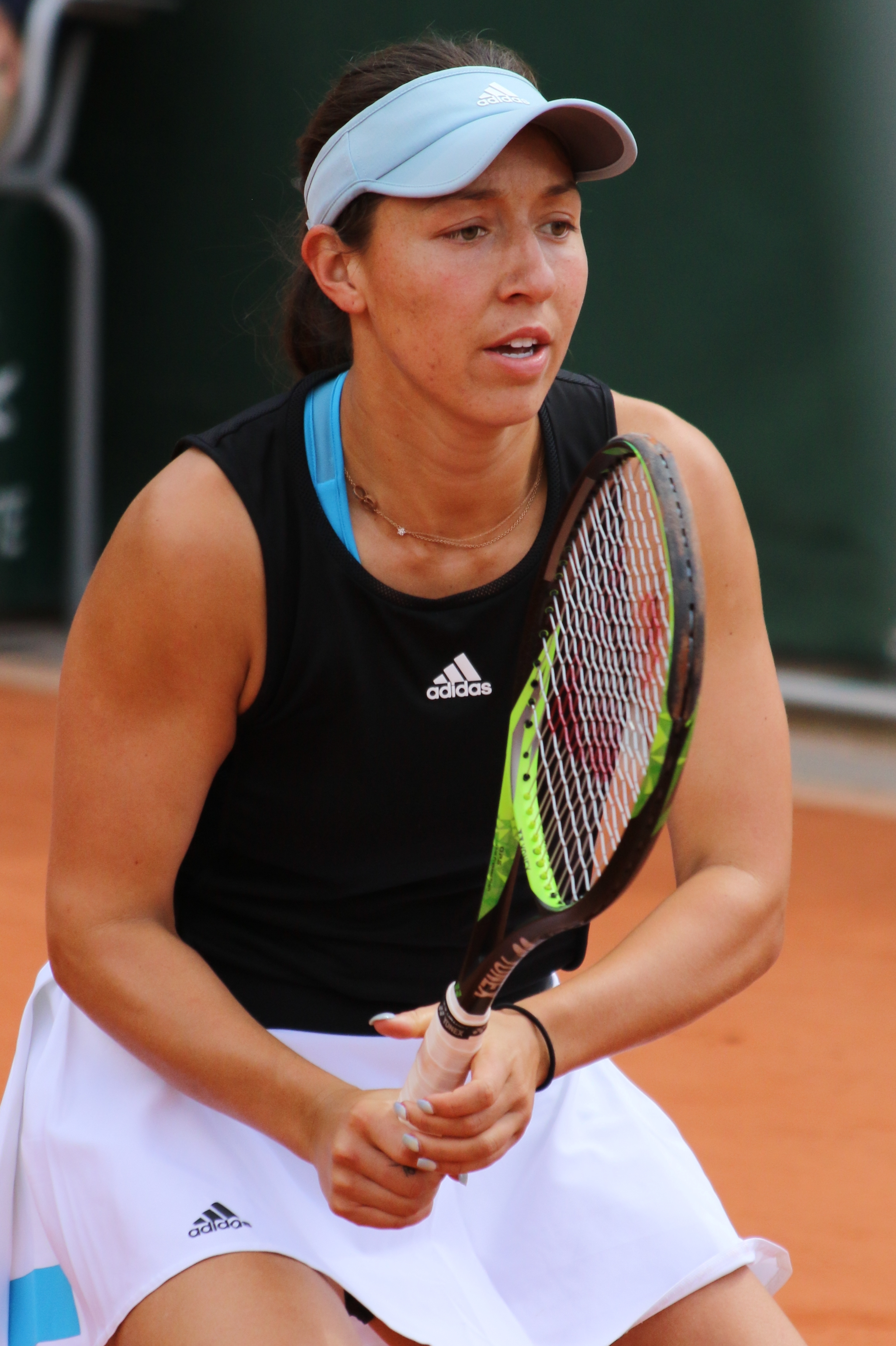
Pegula

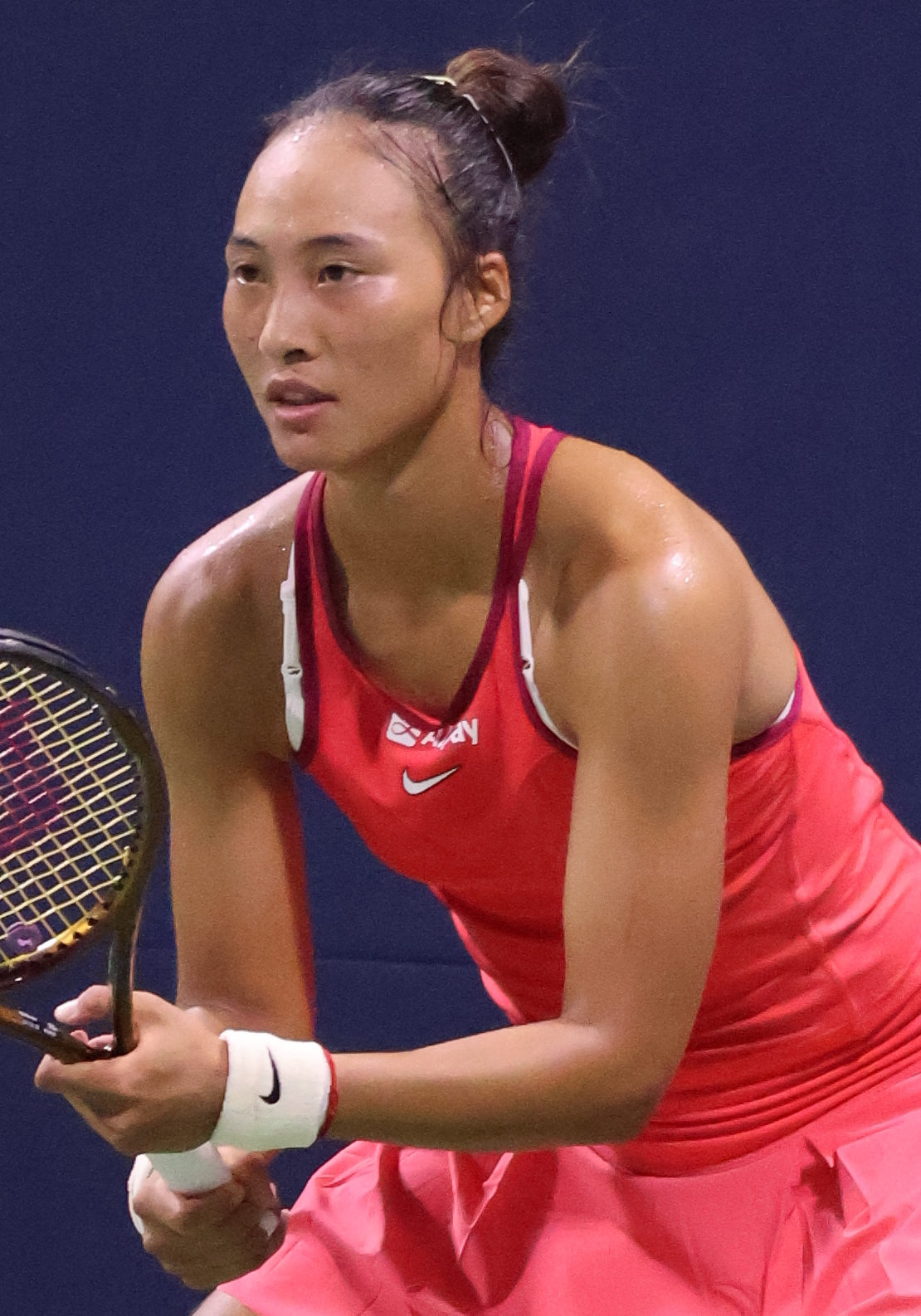
Zheng

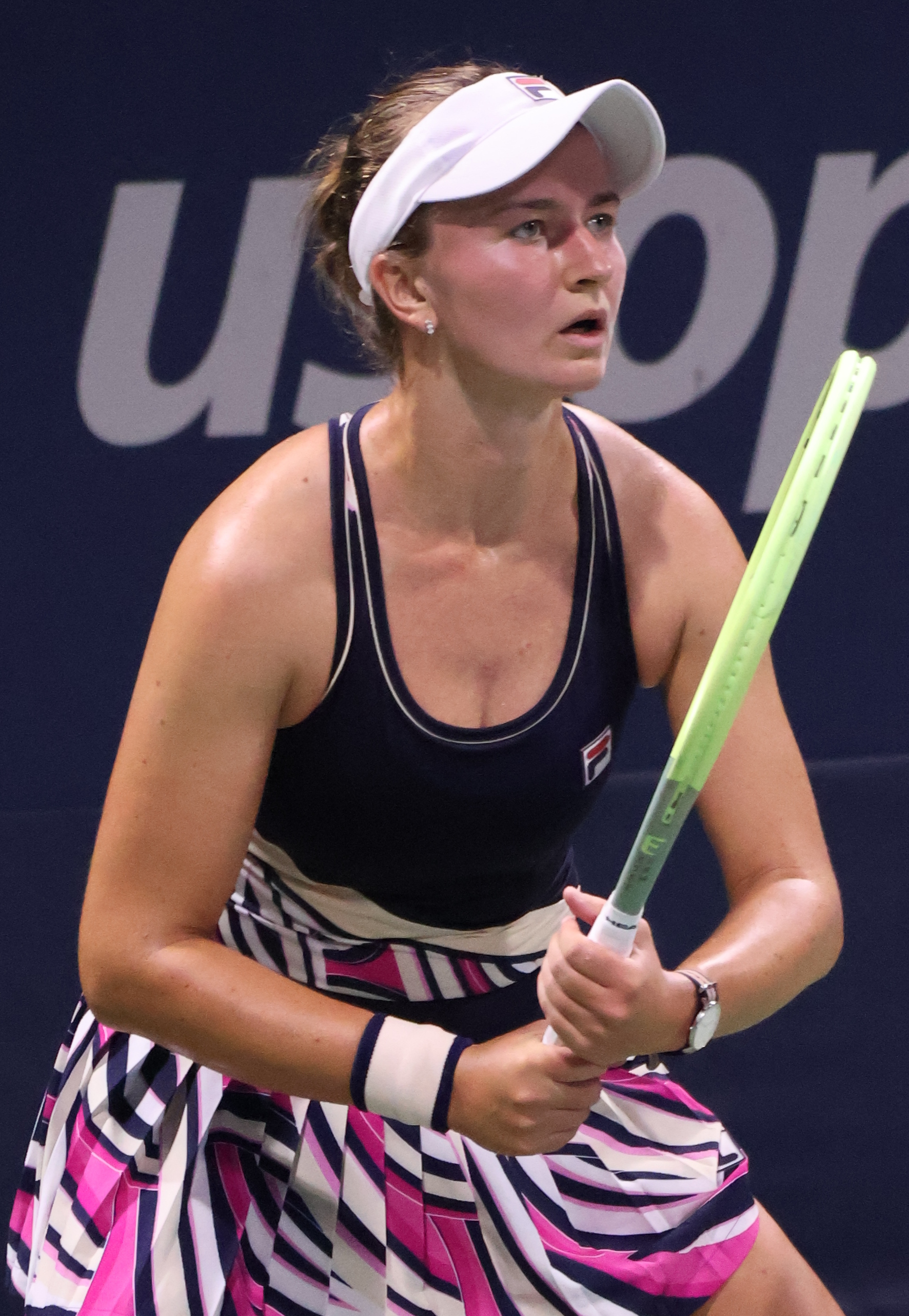
Krejčíková

=== Doubles ===
#	Players	Date qualified
1	(Ukraine) Lyudmyla Kichenok (Latvia) Jelena Ostapenko	12 September
2	(Canada) Gabriela Dabrowski (New Zealand) Erin Routliffe	7 October
3	(Chinese Taipei) Hsieh Su-wei (Belgium) Elise Mertens	16 September
4	(Italy) Sara Errani (Italy) Jasmine Paolini	7 October
5	(United States) Caroline Dolehide (United States) Desirae Krawczyk	14 October
6	(United States) Nicole Melichar-Martinez (Australia) Ellen Perez	18 October
7	(Chinese Taipei) Chan Hao-ching; Veronika Kudermetova	18 October
8	(Czech Republic) Kateřina Siniaková (United States) Taylor Townsend	7 October

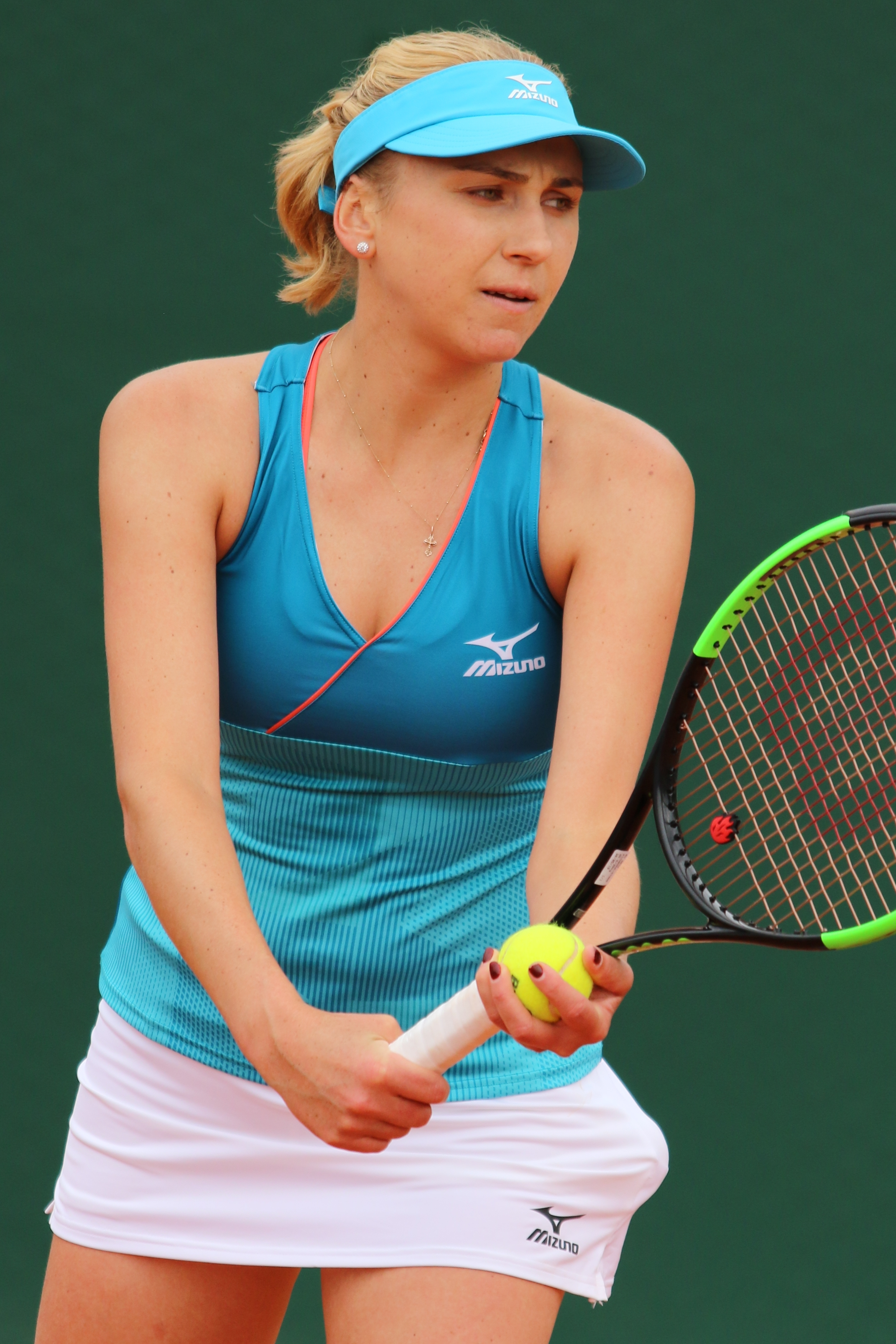
Kichenok

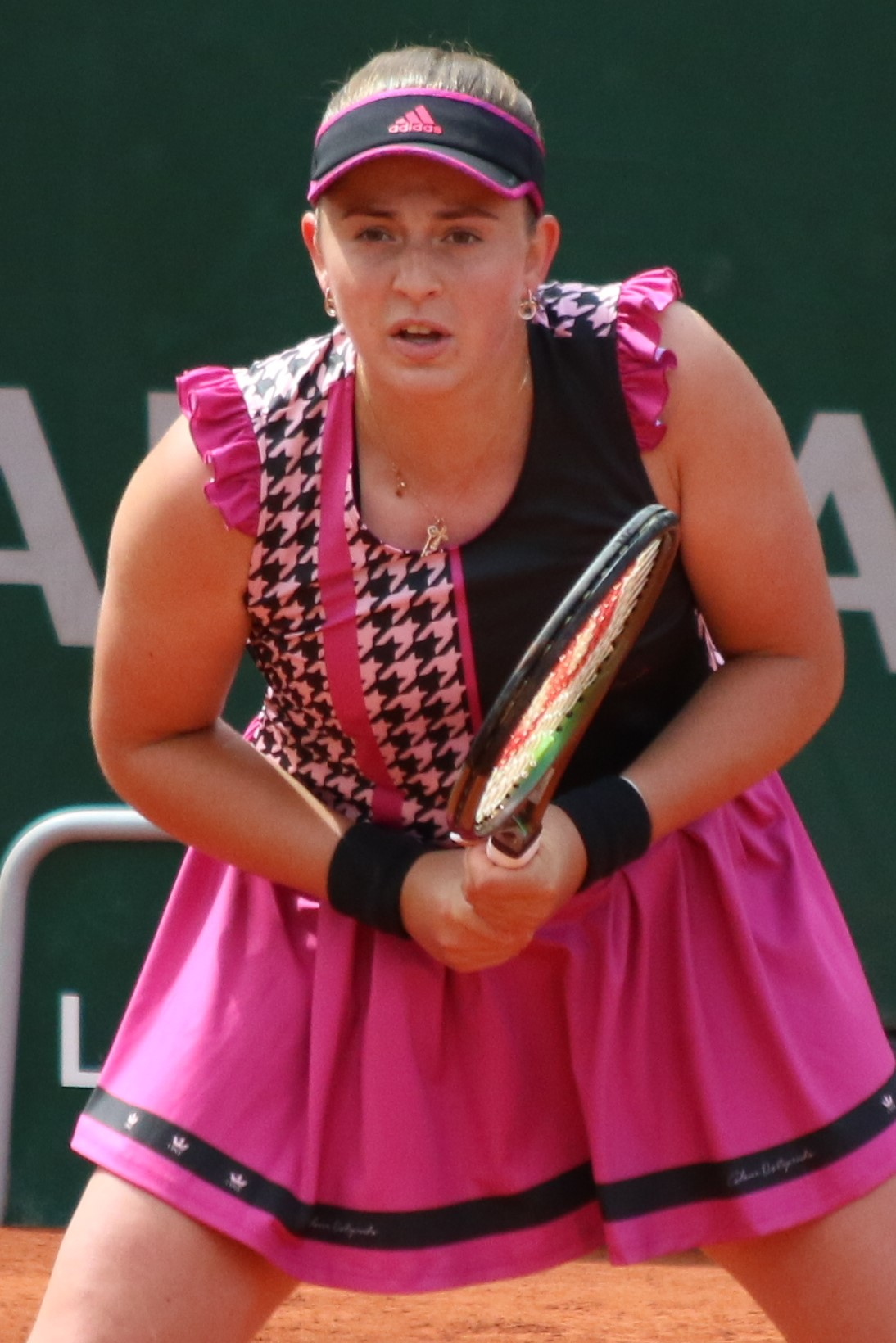
Ostapenko

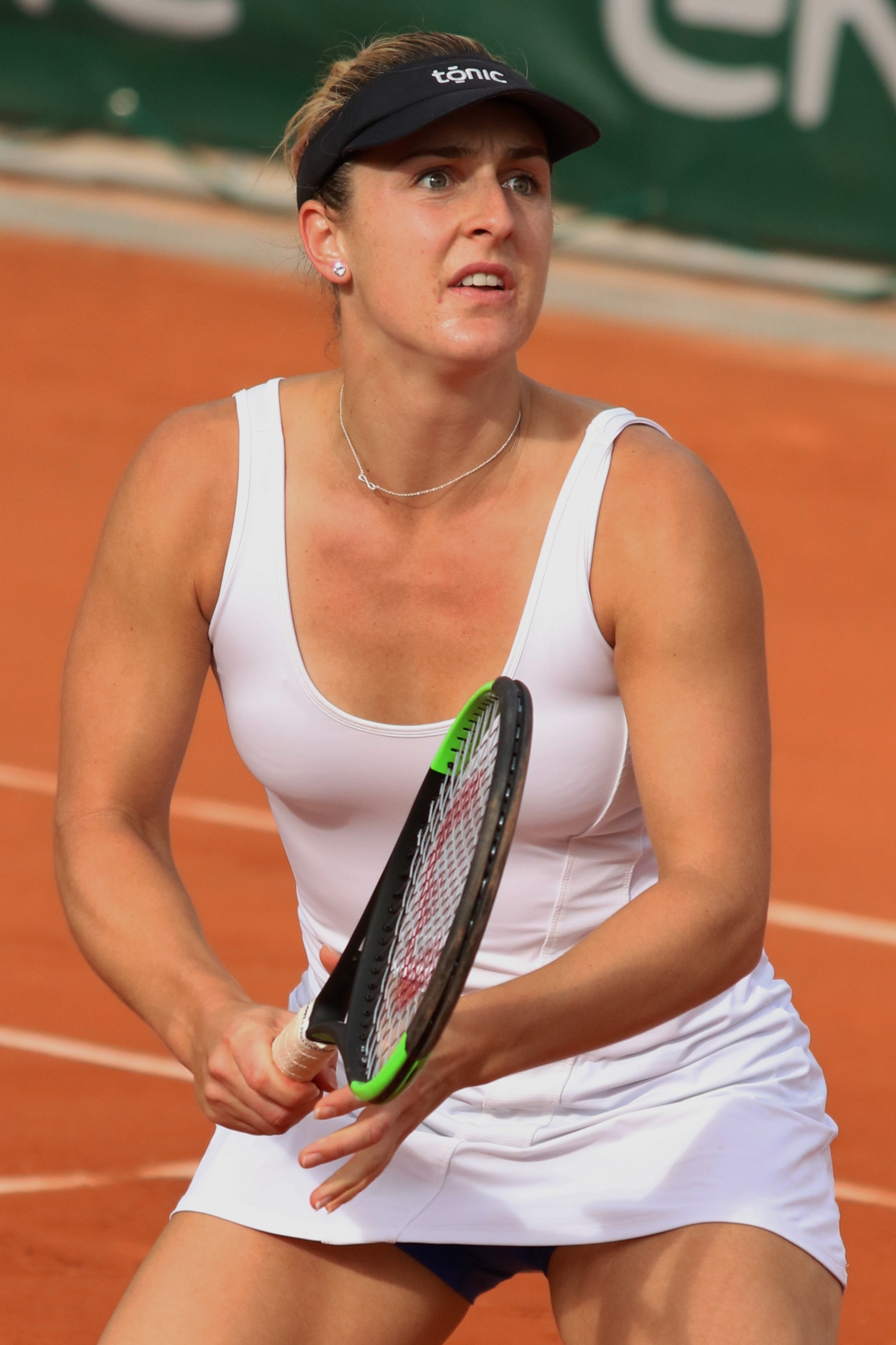
Dabrowski

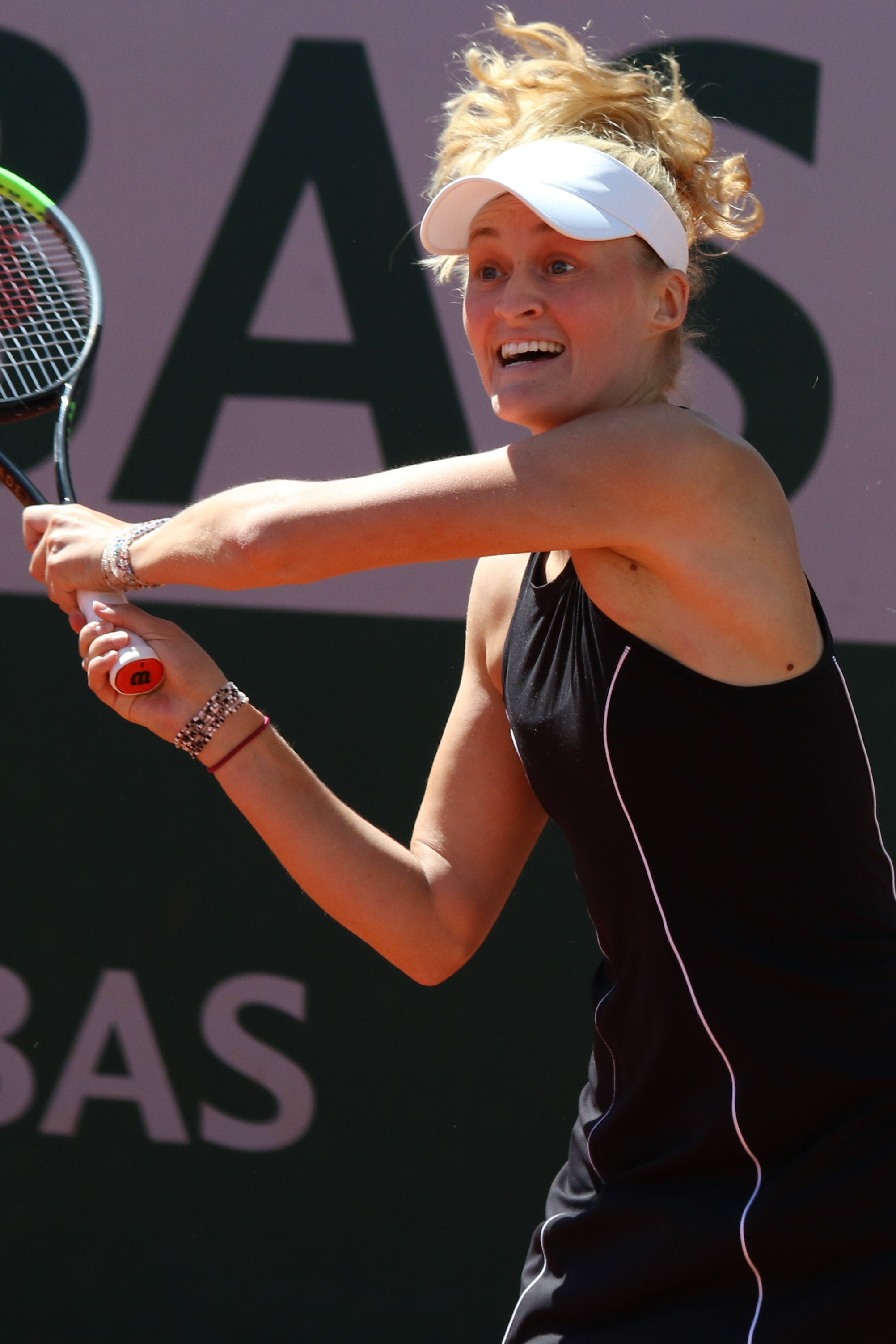
Routliffe

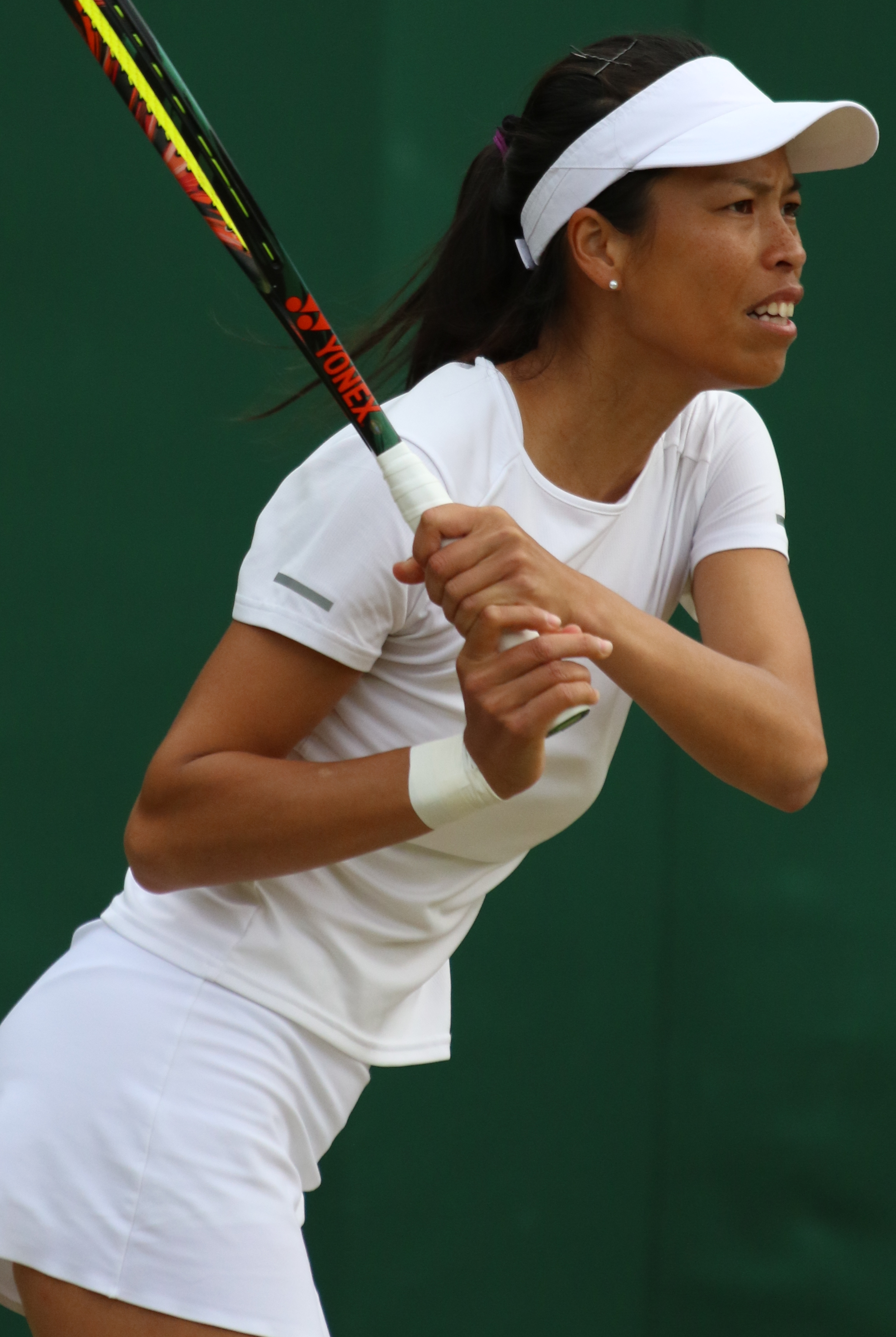
Hsieh

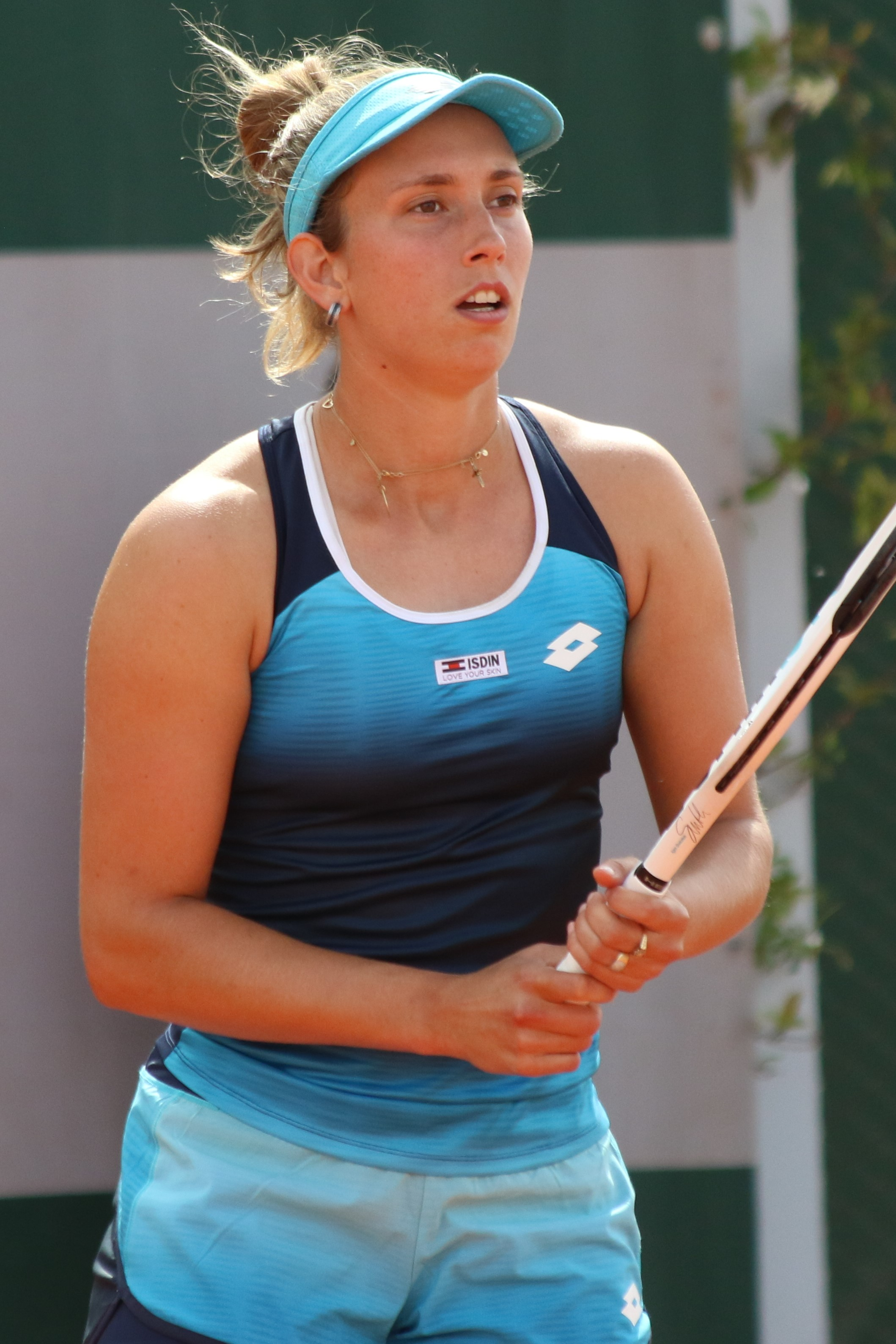
Mertens

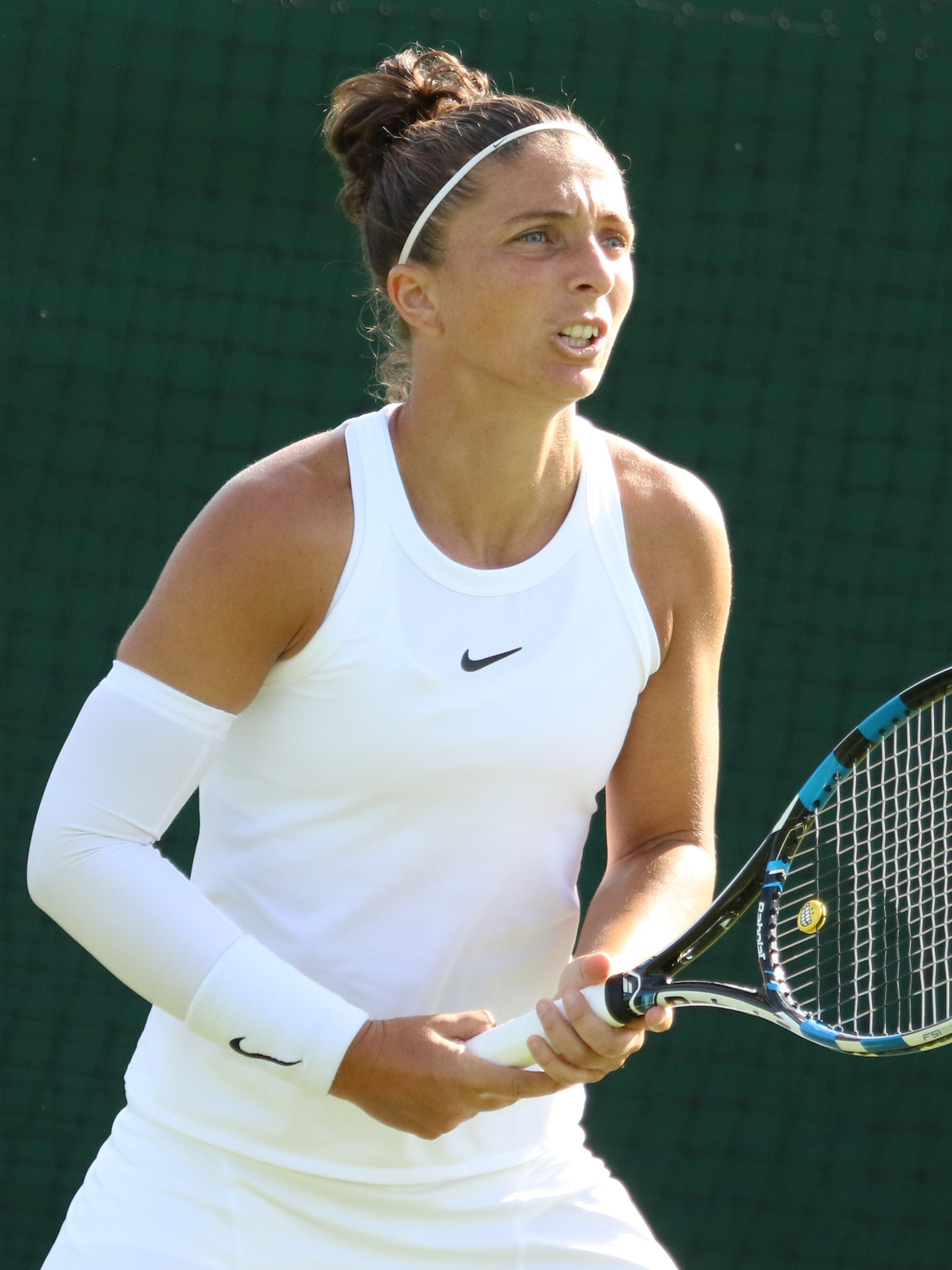
Errani

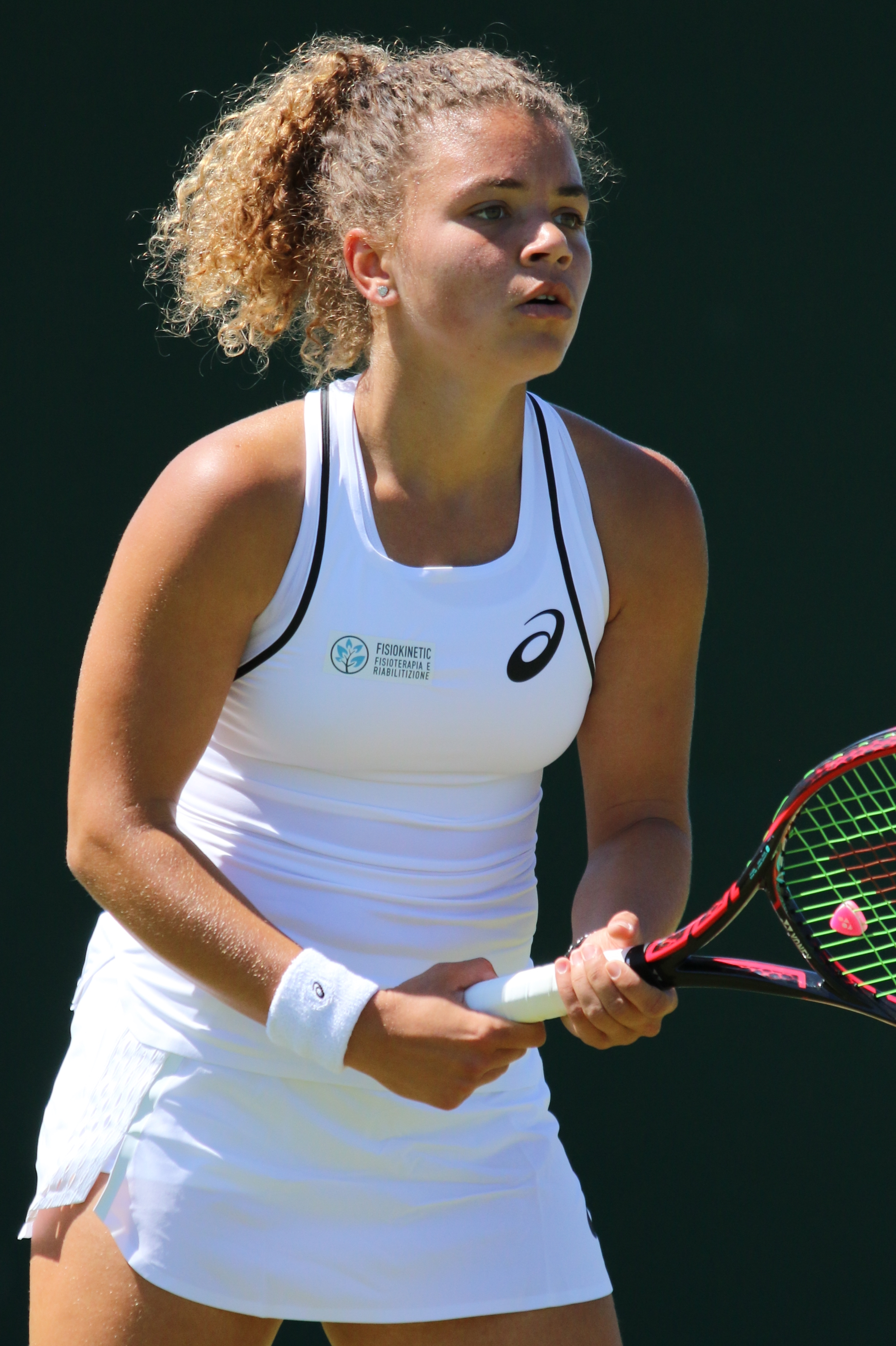
Paolini

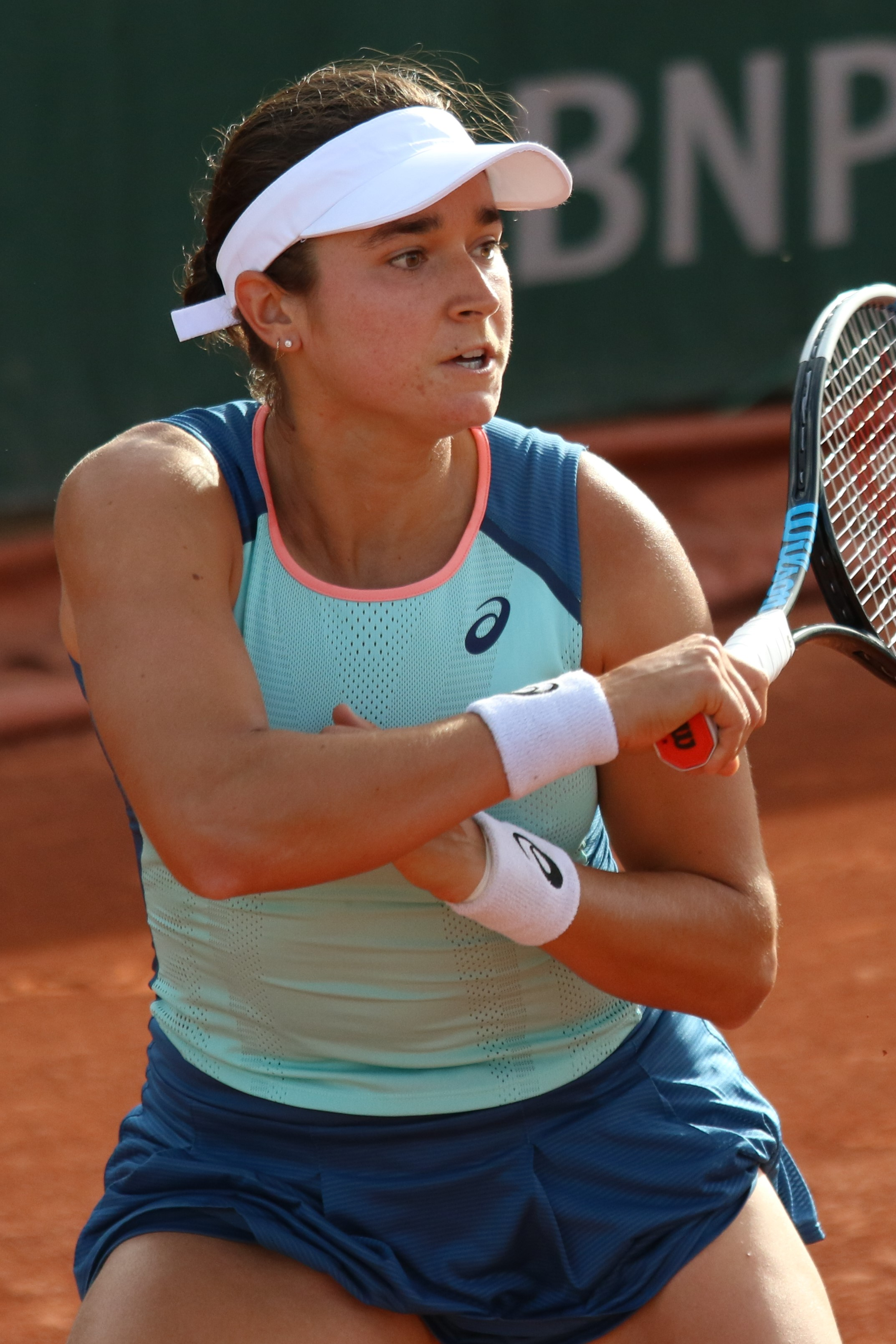
Dolehide

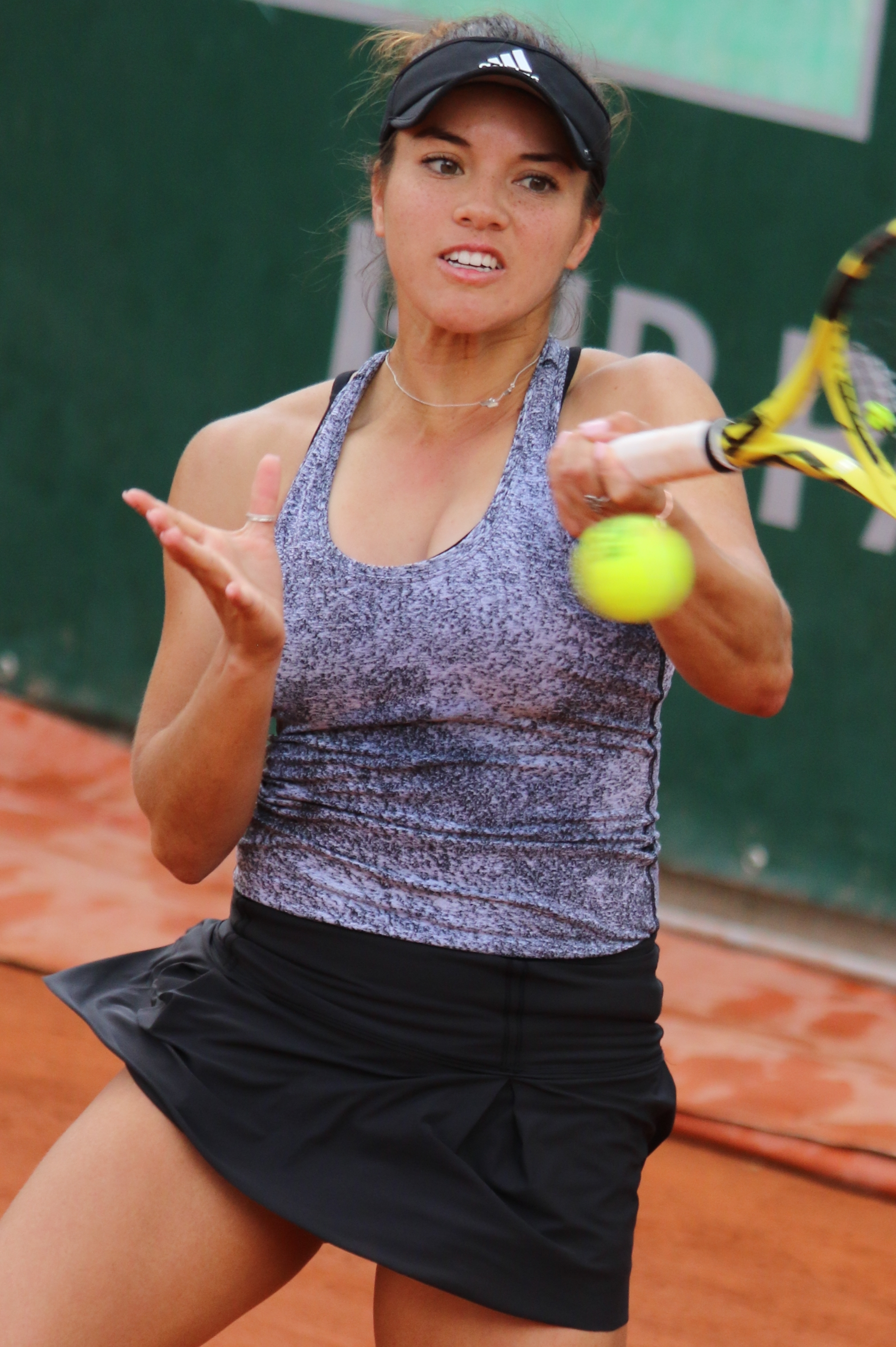
Krawczyk

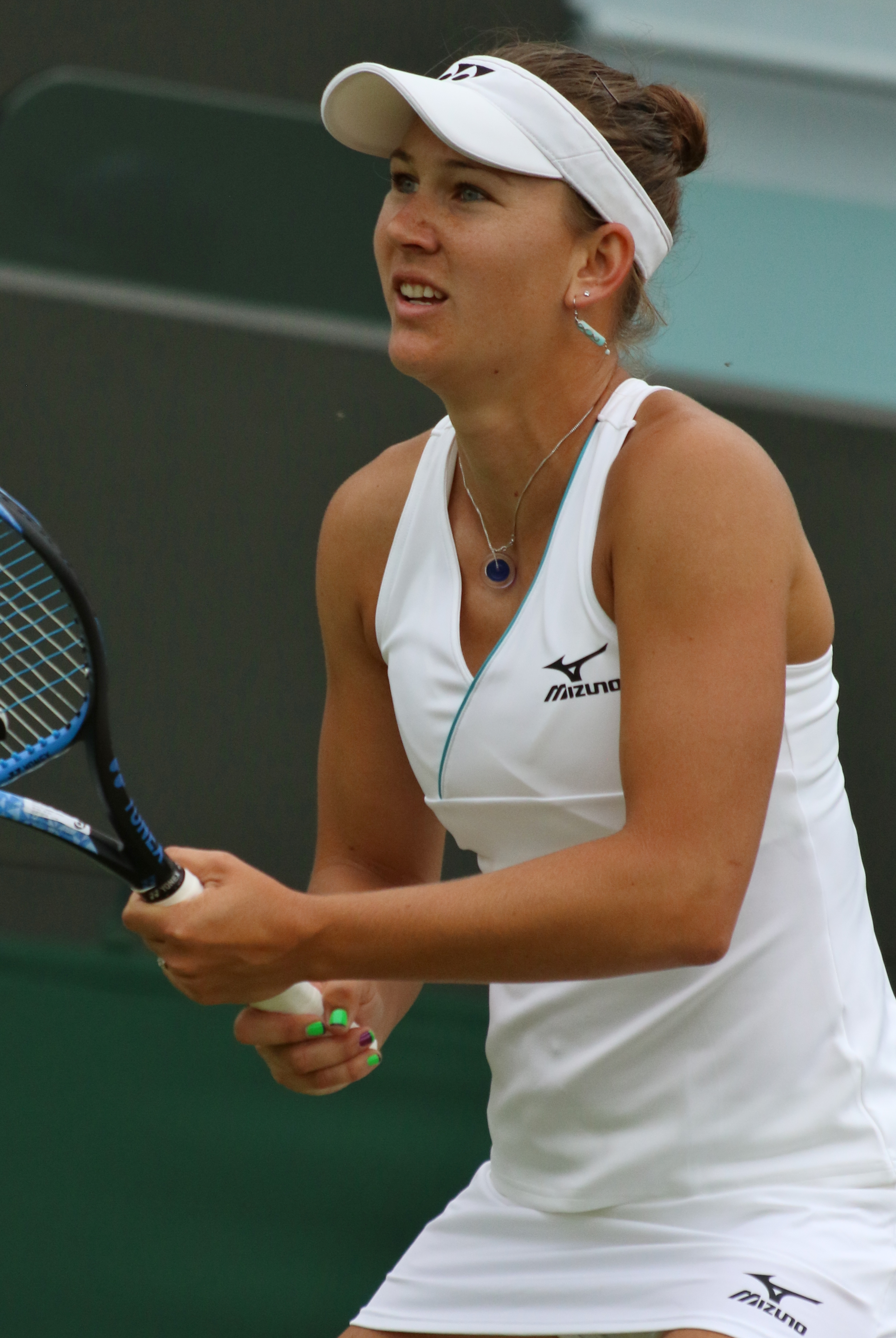
Melichar-Martinez

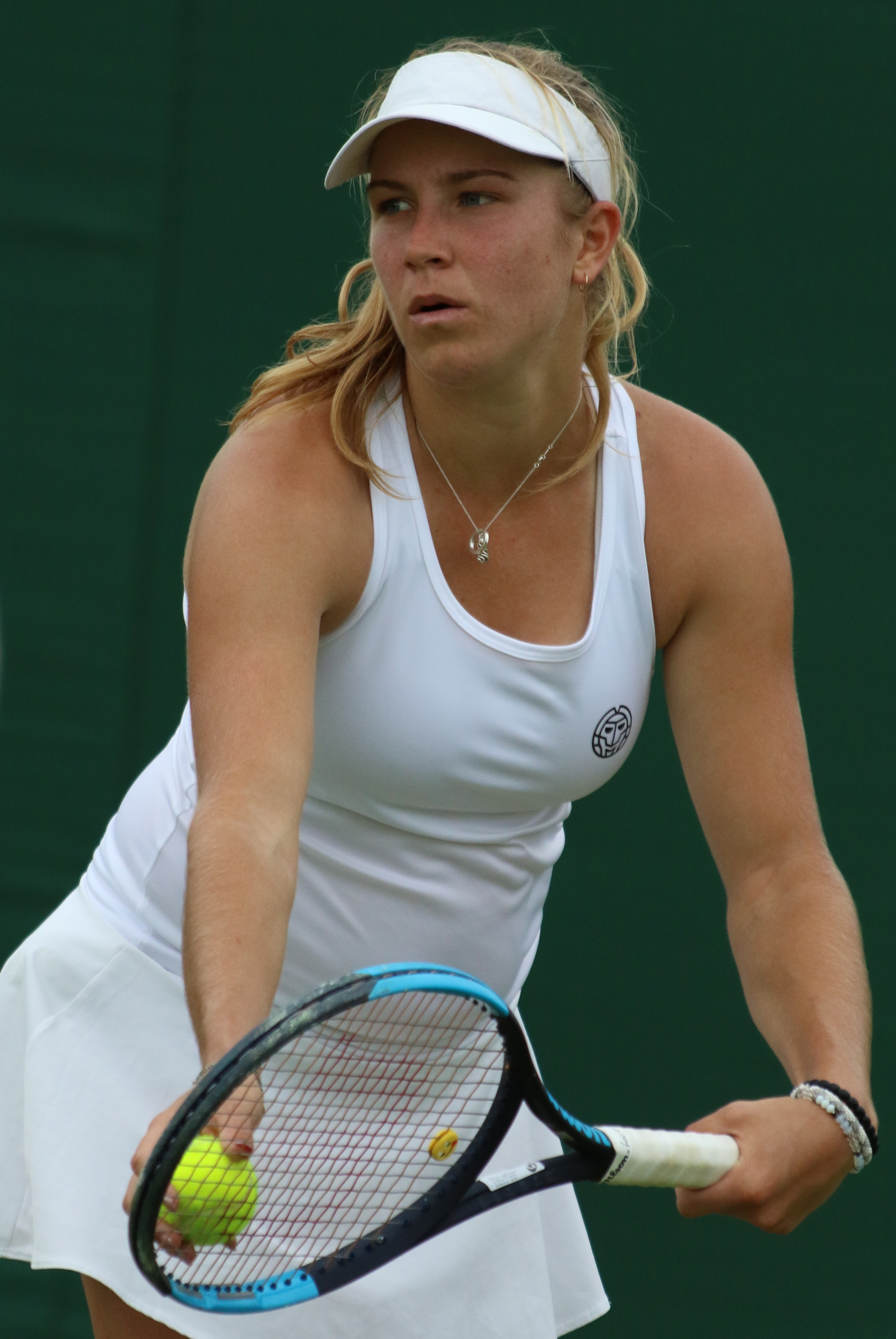
Perez

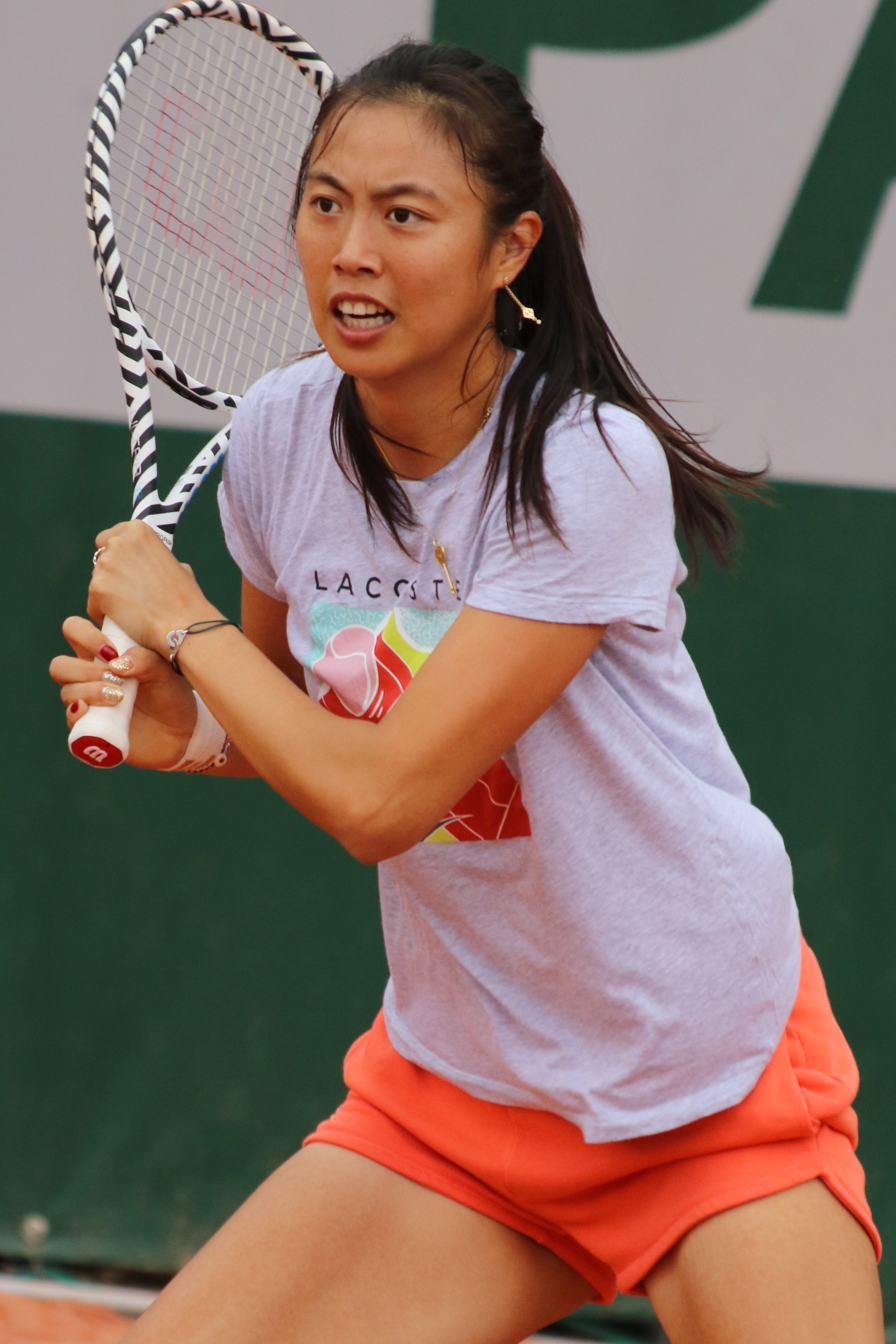
Chan

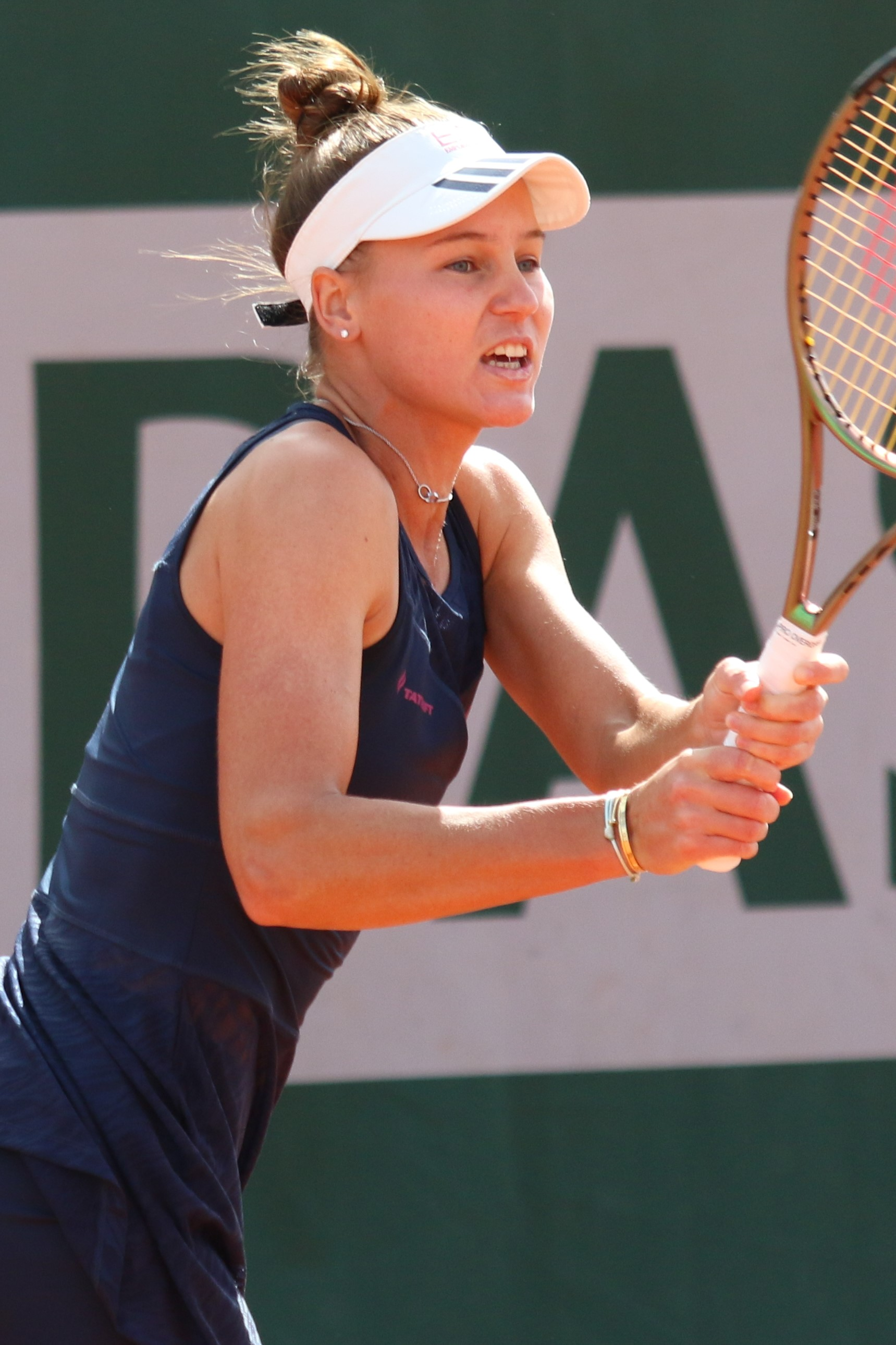
Kudermetova

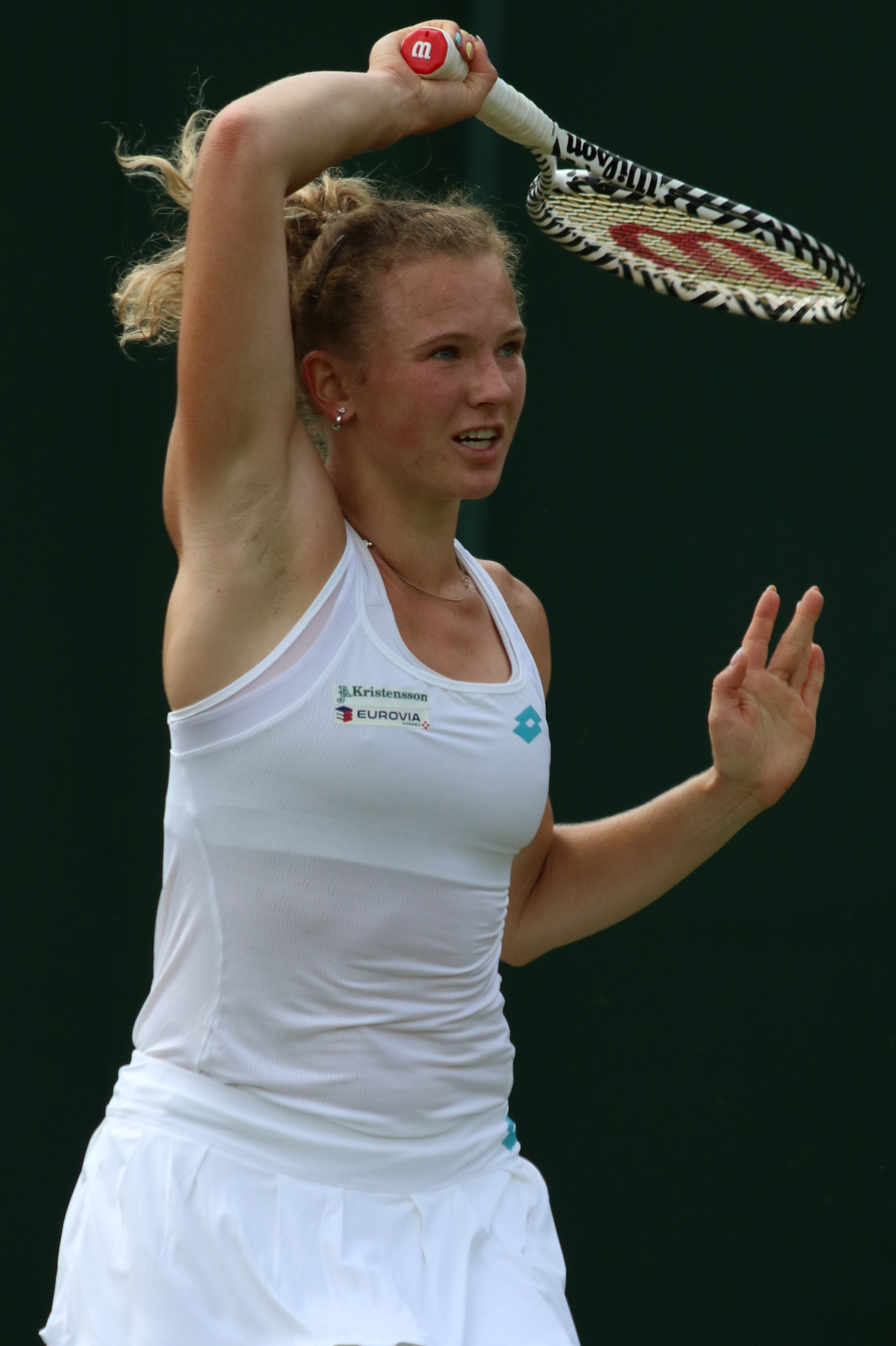
Siniaková

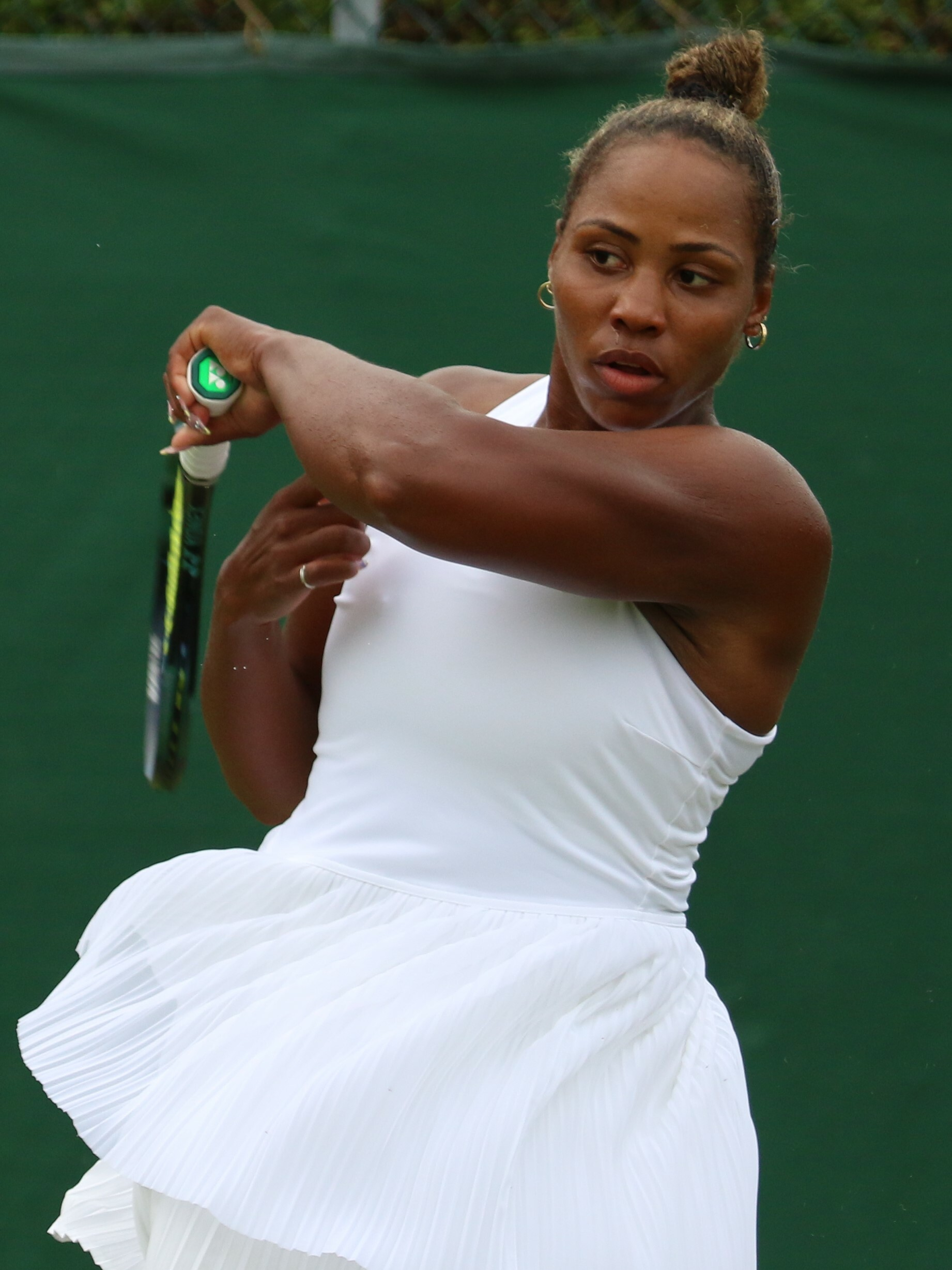
Townsend

== Points breakdown ==
=== Singles ===
† Player qualified for WTA Finals.
Player qualified as alternate but chose not to play

Seed	Player	Grand Slam				WTA 1000							Best other							Total points	Tourn. (Note: 0-point penalties were applied for every WTA 1000 in which players had or would have been accepted into the main draw but were absent and if players fail to fulfill their WTA 500 tournaments commitment obligations, unless they qualify for a long-term injury exemption.)		Titles
Seed	Player	Grand Slam				Best combined						WTA only	Best other							Total points	Tourn.		Titles
Seed	Player	AUS	FRA	WIM	USO	1	2	3	4	5	6	WTA only	1	2	3	4	5	6	7	Total points	Pld.	Abs.	Titles
1^{†}	Aryna Sabalenka	W 2000	QF; 430	A 0	W 2000	W 1000	F 650	F 650	QF; 215	QF; 215	R16; 120	A 0	W 1000	F 325	SF; 195	QF; 108	QF; 108	A 0	A 0	9,016	16	4	4
2^{†}	(Poland) Iga Świątek	R32; 130	W 2000	R32; 130	QF; 430	W 1000	W 1000	W 1000	SF; 390	A 0	A 0	A 0	W 1000	F 500	SF; 390	A 0	A 0	A 0	A 0	7,970	13	7	5
3^{†}	(United States) Coco Gauff	SF; 780	SF; 780	R16; 240	R16; 240	W 1000	SF; 390	SF; 390	R16; 120	R16; 120	R16; 120	SF; 390	W 250	QF; 215	SF; 195	A 0	A 0	A 0	A 0	5,230	17	4	2
4^{†}	(Italy) Jasmine Paolini	R16; 240	F 1300	F 1300	R16; 240	R16; 120	R16; 120	R16; 120	R32; 65	R32; 65	A 0	W 1000	QF; 215	SF; 195	QF; 108	RR; 35	R64; 10	R64; 10	R32; 1	5,144	18	1	1
5^{†}	(Kazakhstan) Elena Rybakina	R64; 70	QF; 430	SF; 780	R64; 70	F 650	SF; 390	A 0	A 0	A 0	A 0	A 0	F 650	W 500	W 500	W 500	QF; 215	QF; 108	QF; 108	4,971	14	5	3
6^{†}	(United States) Jessica Pegula	R64; 70	A 0	R64; 70	F 1300	W 1000	F 650	QF; 215	R16; 120	A 0	A 0	R16; 120	W 500	SF; 195	SF; 195	SF; 195	RR; 35	R16; 30	R64; 10	4,705	16	3	2
7^{†}	(China) Zheng Qinwen	F 1300	R32; 130	R128; 10	QF; 430	SF; 390	QF; 215	R16; 120	R32; 65	R64; 10	A 0	F 650	W 500	W 250	QF; 215	R16; 120	QF; 75	R16; 60	A 0	4,540	18	2	2
8^{†}	(Czech Republic) Barbora Krejčíková (Note: Krejčíková qualified as one of this year's Grand Slam champions ranked in the top 20 on 28 October 2024.)	QF; 430	R128; 10	W 2000	R64; 70	R64; 10	R64; 10	A 0	A 0			R32; 10	QF; 108	QF; 108	QF; 54	R32; 1	R32; 1	R32; 1	R32; 1	2,814	14	2	1
Alternates
–	(United States) Emma Navarro	R32; 130	R16; 240	QF; 430	SF; 780	SF; 390	QF; 215	R16; 120	R32; 65	R64; 10	R64; 10	R16; 120	W 250	SF; 195	SF; 195	SF; 195	SF; 98	R32; 65	R16; 60	3,568	22	0	1
9	Daria Kasatkina	R64; 70	R64; 70	R32; 130	R64; 70	R16; 120	R16; 120	R32; 65	R32; 65	R32; 65	R32; 65	R16; 120	W 500	W 500	F 325	F 325	F 325	F 325	QF; 108	3,368	24	0	2
10	(United States) Danielle Collins	R64; 70	R64; 70	R16; 240	R128; 10	W 1000	SF; 390	R16; 120	A 0	A 0	A 0	A 0	W 500	F 325	QF; 245	R16; 85	QF; 54	R64; 35	R32; 32	3,176	17	4	2

=== Doubles ===
† Team qualified for WTA Finals.

Seed	Team	Points												Total points	Tourn	Titles
Seed	Team	1	2	3	4	5	6	7	8	9	10	11	12	Total points	Tourn	Titles
1^{†}	(Ukraine) Lyudmyla Kichenok (Latvia) Jeļena Ostapenko	W 2000	F 1300	W 500	W 500	QF; 430	QF; 215	QF; 215	QF; 215	QF; 215	R32; 130	R16; 120	SF; 108	5,948	15	3
2^{†}	(Canada) Gabriela Dabrowski (New Zealand) Erin Routliffe	F 1300	SF; 780	F 650	F 650	QF; 430	SF; 390	F 325	W 250	QF; 215	SF; 195	R16; 120	R16; 120	5,425	16	1
3^{†}	(Chinese Taipei) Hsieh Su-wei (Belgium) Elise Mertens	W 2000	W 1000	SF; 780	SF; 390	W 250	QF; 215	QF; 215	R32; 130	QF; 120	R64; 10	R16; 10	R16; 10	5,130	13	3
4^{†}	(Italy) Sara Errani (Italy) Jasmine Paolini	F 1300	W 1000	W 1000	W 500	SF; 390	R16; 240	R16; 240	QF; 215	R32; 130	R32; 10	R32; 10	R16; 10	5,045	14	3
5^{†}	(United States) Caroline Dolehide (United States) Desirae Krawczyk	W 1000	SF; 780	SF; 780	F 650	SF; 390	QF; 215	R32; 130	R16; 120	R16; 120	QF; 108	R16; 60	R32; 10	4,363	17	1
6^{†}	(United States) Nicole Melichar-Martinez (Australia) Ellen Perez	F 650	W 500	W 500	QF; 430	SF; 390	F 325	F 325	R16; 240	QF; 215	SF; 195	R32; 130	R16; 120	4,020	22	2
7^{†}	(Chinese Taipei) Chan Hao-ching; Veronika Kudermetova	SF; 780	F 650	W 500	F 325	F 325	R16; 240	R16; 240	QF; 215	SF; 195	R16; 120	R16; 120	QF; 108	3,818	12	1
8^{†}	(Czech Republic) Kateřina Siniaková (United States) Taylor Townsend (Note: Siniaková/Townsend qualified as one of this year's Grand Slam champions ranked in the top 20 on 28 October 2024.)	W 2000	SF; 780	QF; 215	QF; 215	R32; 10	R16; 1							3,221	6	1
Alternates
9	(United States) Sofia Kenin (United States) Bethanie Mattek-Sands	W 1000	W 500	SF; 390	SF; 390	R16; 240	R16; 240	SF; 195	R32; 130	R16; 120	R16; 120	R32; 10	R32; 10	3,345	14	2
10	(Netherlands) Demi Schuurs (Brazil) Luisa Stefani	W 1000	QF; 430	QF; 430	QF; 215	QF; 215	SF; 195	SF; 195	R16; 120	R64; 10	R32; 10	R32; 10	R32; 10	2,840	16	1

== Head-to-head records ==
Below are the head-to-head records as they approached the tournament.

=== Singles ===
		Sabalenka	Świątek	Gauff	Paolini	Rybakina	Pegula	Zheng	Krejčíková	Overall	YTD W–L
1	Aryna Sabalenka		4–8	4–4	2–2	6–3	6–2	4–0	6–1	32–20	54–12
2	(Poland) Iga Świątek	8–4		11–1	3–0	2–4	6–4	6–1	2–2	38–16	59–8
3	(United States) Coco Gauff	4–4	1–11		2–0	1–0	1–4	1–0	0–1	10–20	50–16
4	(Italy) Jasmine Paolini	2–2	0–3	0–2		2–2	0–5	0–3	0–2	4–19	37–17
5	(Kazakhstan) Elena Rybakina	3–6	4–2	0–1	2–2		1–3	2–0	0–3	12–17	41–9
6	(United States) Jessica Pegula	2–6	4–6	4–1	5–0	3–1		1–0	1–1	20–15	39–14
7	(China) Zheng Qinwen	0–4	1–6	0–1	3–0	0–2	0–1		1–0	5–14	47–16
8	(Czech Republic) Barbora Krejčíková	1–6	2–2	1–0	2–0	3–0	1–1	0–1		10–10	19–14

=== Doubles ===
		Kichenok; Ostapenko	Dabrowski; Routliffe	Hsieh; Mertens	Errani; Paolini	Dolehide; Krawczyk	Melichar; Perez	Chan; Kudermetova	Siniaková; Townsend	Overall	YTD W–L
1	(Ukraine) Lyudmyla Kichenok (Latvia) Jeļena Ostapenko		2–1	0–2	0–1	0–0	2–2	1–0	0–1	5–7	35–11
2	(Canada) Gabriela Dabrowski (New Zealand) Erin Routliffe	1–2		0–0	0–0	1–1	0–1	0–1	0–1	2–6	34–14
3	(Chinese Taipei) Hsieh Su-wei (Belgium) Elise Mertens	2–0	0–0		1–0	0–0	1–0	0–0	0–1	4–1	27–10
4	(Italy) Sara Errani (Italy) Jasmine Paolini	1–0	0–0	0–1		1–0	2–0	1–0	0–0	5–1	33–11
5	(United States) Caroline Dolehide (United States) Desirae Krawczyk	0–0	1–1	0–0	0–1		1–0	1–0	0–0	3–2	25–15
6	(United States) Nicole Melichar (Australia) Ellen Perez	2–2	1–0	0–1	0–2	0–1		1–1	0–0	4–7	35–20
7	(Chinese Taipei) Chan Hao-ching; Veronika Kudermetova	0–1	1–0	0–0	0–1	0–1	1–1		0–0	2–4	28–9
8	(Czech Republic) Kateřina Siniaková (United States) Taylor Townsend	1–0	1–0	1–0	0–0	0–0	0–0	0–0		3–0	12–5

== See also ==
- WTA rankings
- 2024 WTA Tour
- 2024 ATP Finals
