= 2024 Miami Open – Women's doubles =

Women's doubles
- 2024 Miami Open

Final
- Champions: (United States) Sofia Kenin (United States) Bethanie Mattek-Sands
- Runners-up: (Canada) Gabriela Dabrowski (New Zealand) Erin Routliffe
- Score: 4–6, 7–6^{(7–5)}, [11–9]

Events
Singles	men	women
Doubles	men	women
- Miami Open

Sofia Kenin and Bethanie Mattek-Sands defeated Gabriela Dabrowski and Erin Routliffe in the final, 4–6, 7–6^{(7–5)}, [11–9] to win the women's doubles tennis title at the 2024 Miami Open.

Coco Gauff and Jessica Pegula were the defending champions, but lost in the first round to Ashlyn Krueger and Sloane Stephens.

Hsieh Su-wei retained the WTA No. 1 doubles ranking after Storm Hunter and her partner Kateřina Siniaková withdrew from their first-round match.

== Seeds ==
1. (Chinese Taipei) Hsieh Su-wei / (Belgium) Elise Mertens (quarterfinals)
2. (Canada) Gabriela Dabrowski / (New Zealand) Erin Routliffe (final)
3. (Australia) Storm Hunter / (Czech Republic) Kateřina Siniaková (withdrew)
4. (United States) Nicole Melichar-Martinez / (Australia) Ellen Perez (second round)
5. (United States) Coco Gauff / (United States) Jessica Pegula (first round)
6. (Brazil) Beatriz Haddad Maia / (United States) Taylor Townsend (first round)
7. (Netherlands) Demi Schuurs / (Brazil) Luisa Stefani (first round)
8. (Germany) Laura Siegemund / (China) Xu Yifan (second round)

== Draw ==
Key

- Q = Qualifier
- WC = Wild card
- LL = Lucky loser
- Alt = Alternate
- ITF = ITF entry
- PR = Protected ranking
- SR = Special ranking
- SE = Special exempt
- JE = Junior exempt
- JR = Junior Accelerator Programme entrant
- CO = College Accelerator Programme entrant
- NG = Next Gen Accelerator Program entrant
- w/o = Walkover
- r = Retired
- d = Defaulted

=== Finals ===
Semifinals
Alt	(United States) Sofia Kenin (United States) Bethanie Mattek-Sands	6^{2}	6	[10]
(Italy) Sara Errani (Italy) Jasmine Paolini	7^{7}	4	[1]
(United States) Asia Muhammad (United States) Alycia Parks	7^{7}	4	[4]
2	(Canada) Gabriela Dabrowski (New Zealand) Erin Routliffe	6^{4}	6	[10]

Final
Alt	(United States) Sofia Kenin (United States) Bethanie Mattek-Sands	4	7^{7}	[11]
2	(Canada) Gabriela Dabrowski (New Zealand) Erin Routliffe	6	6^{5}	[9]

=== Top half ===
First round
1	(Chinese Taipei) S-w Hsieh (Belgium) E Mertens	7^{7}	6
(Spain) C Bucșa; A Panova	6^{5}	3
WC	(China) X Jiang (China) Y Yuan	0	3
Alt	A Blinkova (Brazil) I Gamarra Martins	6	6
(Ukraine) L Kichenok (Latvia) J Ostapenko	6	3	[8]
Alt	(United States) S Kenin (United States) B Mattek-Sands	4	6	[10]
(Georgia (country)) O Kalashnikova (Romania) M Niculescu	2	6	[10]
7	(Netherlands) D Schuurs (Brazil) L Stefani	6	2	[6]
Alt	(Poland) M Fręch (Australia) D Saville	7	5	[8]
PR	(China) Xin Wang (China) S Zheng	5	7	[10]
E Alexandrova; I Khromacheva	6	6
(Chinese Taipei) H-c Chan (Mexico) G Olmos	3	1
(Slovakia) T Mihalíková (United Kingdom) H Watson	3	6	[5]
(Italy) S Errani (Italy) J Paolini	6	3	[10]
(Kazakhstan) A Danilina (China) S Zhang	6^{4}	3
8	(Germany) L Siegemund (China) Y Xu	7^{7}	6

Second round
1	(Chinese Taipei) S-w Hsieh (Belgium) E Mertens	7	7
Alt	A Blinkova (Brazil) I Gamarra Martins	5	5
Alt	(United States) S Kenin (United States) B Mattek-Sands	6	6
(Georgia (country)) O Kalashnikova (Romania) M Niculescu	3	4
PR	(China) Xin Wang (China) S Zheng	4	6	[2]
E Alexandrova; I Khromacheva	6	2	[10]
(Italy) S Errani (Italy) J Paolini	6	6
8	(Germany) L Siegemund (China) Y Xu	4	1

Quarterfinals
1	(Chinese Taipei) S-w Hsieh (Belgium) E Mertens	6	4	[9]
Alt	(United States) S Kenin (United States) B Mattek-Sands	1	6	[11]
E Alexandrova; I Khromacheva	2	2
(Italy) S Errani (Italy) J Paolini	6	6

Semifinals
Alt	(United States) S Kenin (United States) B Mattek-Sands	6^{2}	6	[10]
(Italy) S Errani (Italy) J Paolini	7^{7}	4	[1]

=== Bottom half ===
First round
6	(Brazil) B Haddad Maia (United States) T Townsend	6	4	[11]
(United States) A Muhammad (United States) A Parks	2	6	[13]
PR	(Japan) S Aoyama (Serbia) A Krunić	6	4	[11]
(Ukraine) N Kichenok (Chinese Taipei) F-h Wu	4	6	[9]
(Ukraine) A Kalinina (Ukraine) D Yastremska	6	7^{7}
(United States) C Dolehide (United States) D Krawczyk	2	6^{4}
V Kudermetova; A Potapova	2	2
4	(United States) N Melichar-Martinez (Australia) E Perez	6	6
5	(United States) C Gauff (United States) J Pegula	3	6	[8]
WC	(United States) A Krueger (United States) S Stephens	6	1	[10]
(Czech Republic) L Nosková (China) Xiy Wang	6	7^{7}
(Poland) M Linette (United States) B Pera	4	6^{4}
(Japan) E Hozumi (Japan) M Ninomiya	2	5
(Japan) M Kato (Indonesia) A Sutjiadi	6	7
(Norway) U Eikeri (China) H Guo	3	2
2	(Canada) G Dabrowski (New Zealand) E Routliffe	6	6

Second round
(United States) A Muhammad (United States) A Parks	6	4	[10]
PR	(Japan) S Aoyama (Serbia) A Krunić	4	6	[8]
(Ukraine) A Kalinina (Ukraine) D Yastremska	7^{8}	6
4	(United States) N Melichar-Martinez (Australia) E Perez	6^{6}	4
WC	(United States) A Krueger (United States) S Stephens	1	6	[10]
(Czech Republic) L Nosková (China) Xiy Wang	6	4	[1]
(Japan) M Kato (Indonesia) A Sutjiadi	4	4
2	(Canada) G Dabrowski (New Zealand) E Routliffe	6	6

Quarterfinals
(United States) A Muhammad (United States) A Parks	5	6	[10]
(Ukraine) A Kalinina (Ukraine) D Yastremska	7	3	[6]
WC	(United States) A Krueger (United States) S Stephens	3	6	[4]
2	(Canada) G Dabrowski (New Zealand) E Routliffe	6	4	[10]

Semifinals
(United States) A Muhammad (United States) A Parks	7^{7}	4	[4]
2	(Canada) G Dabrowski (New Zealand) E Routliffe	6^{4}	6	[10]

== Seeded teams ==
The following are the seeded teams. Seedings are based on WTA rankings as of March 4, 2024.

Country	Player	Country	Player	Rank	Seed
TPE	Hsieh Su-wei	BEL	Elise Mertens	3	1
CAN	Gabriela Dabrowski	NZL	Erin Routliffe	11	2
~~AUS~~	~~Storm Hunter~~	~~CZE~~	~~Kateřina Siniaková~~	~~15~~	~~3~~
USA	Nicole Melichar-Martinez	AUS	Ellen Perez	15	4
USA	Coco Gauff	USA	Jessica Pegula	24	5
NED	Demi Schuurs	BRA	Luisa Stefani	28	6
BRA	Beatriz Haddad Maia	USA	Taylor Townsend	28	7
GER	Laura Siegemund	CHN	Xu Yifan	40	8

== Other entry information ==
=== Wild cards ===
- (China) Jiang Xinyu / (China) Yuan Yue
- ~~(United States) Madison Keys / (United States) Peyton Stearns~~
- (United States) Ashlyn Krueger / (United States) Sloane Stephens

=== Protected ranking ===
- (Japan) Shuko Aoyama / (Serbia) Aleksandra Krunić
- (China) Wang Xinyu / (China) Zheng Saisai

=== Alternates ===
- Anna Blinkova / (Brazil) Ingrid Gamarra Martins
- (Poland) Magdalena Fręch / (Australia) Daria Saville
- (United States) Sofia Kenin / (United States) Bethanie Mattek-Sands

=== Withdrawals ===
- (Czech Republic) Marie Bouzková / (Spain) Sara Sorribes Tormo → replaced by (United States) Sofia Kenin / (United States) Bethanie Mattek-Sands
- (Australia) Storm Hunter / (Czech Republic) Kateřina Siniaková → replaced by (Poland) Magdalena Fręch / (Australia) Daria Saville
- (United States) Madison Keys / (United States) Peyton Stearns → replaced by Anna Blinkova / (Brazil) Ingrid Gamarra Martins
