= 2024 Qatar TotalEnergies Open – Doubles =

Doubles
- 2024 Qatar TotalEnergies Open

Final
- Champions: (Netherlands) Demi Schuurs (Brazil) Luisa Stefani
- Runners-up: (United States) Caroline Dolehide (United States) Desirae Krawczyk
- Score: 6–4, 6–2

Details
- Draw: 28
- Seeds: 8

Events
Singles	Doubles
← 2023 ·	WTA Qatar Open	· 2025 →

Demi Schuurs and Luisa Stefani defeated Caroline Dolehide and Desirae Krawczyk in the final, 6–4, 6–2 to win the doubles tennis title at the 2024 WTA Qatar Open. They did not drop a set en route to the title.

Coco Gauff and Jessica Pegula were the two-time reigning champions, but did not participate this year.

== Seeds ==
The top four seeds received a bye into the second round.

1. (Chinese Taipei) Hsieh Su-wei / (Belgium) Elise Mertens (quarterfinals)
2. (Canada) Gabriela Dabrowski / (New Zealand) Erin Routliffe (second round)
3. (United States) Nicole Melichar-Martinez / (Australia) Ellen Perez (second round)
4. (Czech Republic) Barbora Krejčíková / (Germany) Laura Siegemund (withdrew)
5. (Netherlands) Demi Schuurs / (Brazil) Luisa Stefani (champions)
6. (Ukraine) Lyudmyla Kichenok / (Latvia) Jeļena Ostapenko (first round)
7. (Australia) Storm Hunter / (United States) Alycia Parks (first round)
8. (Chinese Taipei) Chan Hao-ching / (Mexico) Giuliana Olmos (first round)

== Draw ==
=== Key ===
- Q = Qualifier
- WC = Wild card
- LL = Lucky loser
- Alt = Alternate
- SE = Special exempt
- PR = Protected ranking
- ITF = ITF entry
- JE = Junior exempt
- w/o = Walkover
- r = Retired
- d = Defaulted
- SR = Special ranking

=== Finals ===
Semifinals
5	(Netherlands) Demi Schuurs (Brazil) Luisa Stefani	6	6
(Czech Republic) Marie Bouzková (Czech Republic) Markéta Vondroušová	1	4
(United States) Caroline Dolehide (United States) Desirae Krawczyk	7^{7}	6
(Ukraine) Anhelina Kalinina (China) Xu Yifan	6^{5}	4

Final
5	(Netherlands) Demi Schuurs (Brazil) Luisa Stefani	6	6
(United States) Caroline Dolehide (United States) Desirae Krawczyk	4	2

=== Top half ===
First round
(Canada) L Fernandez (Georgia (country)) O Kalashnikova	6	3	[13]
(Italy) S Errani (Italy) J Paolini	4	6	[11]
(Hungary) T Babos (Croatia) D Vekić	6^{5}	2
A Potapova; V Zvonareva	7^{7}	6
(Kazakhstan) A Danilina (Ukraine) N Kichenok	4	6^{8}
5	(Netherlands) D Schuurs (Brazil) L Stefani	6	7^{10}
(France) C Garcia (France) K Mladenovic	4	6	[3]
(Czech Republic) M Bouzková (Czech Republic) M Vondroušová	6	3	[10]
(Norway) U Eikeri (China) H Guo	6	6
(United States) B Mattek-Sands (China) Xin Wang	2	4
(Japan) E Hozumi (Japan) M Ninomiya	6	6
6	(Ukraine) L Kichenok (Latvia) J Ostapenko	3	3

Second round
1	(Chinese Taipei) S-w Hsieh (Belgium) E Mertens	w/o
(Canada) L Fernandez (Georgia (country)) O Kalashnikova
A Potapova; V Zvonareva	6^{6}	1
5	(Netherlands) D Schuurs (Brazil) L Stefani	7^{8}	6
Alt	(Slovakia) T Mihalíková (Czech Republic) L Nosková	4	4
(Czech Republic) M Bouzková (Czech Republic) M Vondroušová	6	6
(Norway) U Eikeri (China) H Guo	6	6
(Japan) E Hozumi (Japan) M Ninomiya	4	1

Quarterfinals
1	(Chinese Taipei) S-w Hsieh (Belgium) E Mertens	1	3
5	(Netherlands) D Schuurs (Brazil) L Stefani	6	6
(Czech Republic) M Bouzková (Czech Republic) M Vondroušová	3	6	[10]
(Norway) U Eikeri (China) H Guo	6	1	[6]

Semifinals
5	(Netherlands) D Schuurs (Brazil) L Stefani	6	6
(Czech Republic) M Bouzková (Czech Republic) M Vondroušová	1	4

=== Bottom half ===
First round
8	(Chinese Taipei) H-c Chan (Mexico) G Olmos	6^{5}	4
(Japan) M Kato (Indonesia) A Sutjiadi	7^{7}	6
V Kudermetova; A Panova	2	5
(Spain) C Bucșa (Romania) M Niculescu	6	7
(Brazil) I Martins (Chinese Taipei) F-h Wu	2	3
(United States) C Dolehide (United States) D Krawczyk	6	6
7	(Australia) S Hunter (United States) A Parks	2	4
(United States) S Kenin (Netherlands) A Rus	6	6
WC	(Qatar) M Al-Naimi (Turkey) İ Öz	2	1
(Ukraine) A Kalinina (China) Y Xu	6	6
E Alexandrova; I Khromacheva	0	6	[11]
PR	(Japan) S Aoyama (Serbia) A Krunić	6	2	[9]

Second round
(Japan) M Kato (Indonesia) A Sutjiadi	2	5
(Spain) C Bucșa (Romania) M Niculescu	6	7
(United States) C Dolehide (United States) D Krawczyk	7	7
3	(United States) N Melichar-Martinez (Australia) E Perez	5	5
(United States) S Kenin (Netherlands) A Rus	6^{3}	6^{2}
(Ukraine) A Kalinina (China) Y Xu	7^{7}	7^{7}
E Alexandrova; I Khromacheva	3	6	[10]
2	(Canada) G Dabrowski (New Zealand) E Routliffe	6	3	[4]

Quarterfinals
(Spain) C Bucșa (Romania) M Niculescu	3	6^{5}
(United States) C Dolehide (United States) D Krawczyk	6	7^{7}
(Ukraine) A Kalinina (China) Y Xu	4	6	[10]
E Alexandrova; I Khromacheva	6	4	[8]

Semifinals
(United States) C Dolehide (United States) D Krawczyk	7^{7}	6
(Ukraine) A Kalinina (China) Y Xu	6^{5}	4
