= 2024 Qatar TotalEnergies Open – Singles =

Singles
- 2024 Qatar TotalEnergies Open

Final
- Champion: (Poland) Iga Świątek
- Runner-up: (Kazakhstan) Elena Rybakina
- Score: 7–6^{(10–8)}, 6–2

Details
- Draw: 56
- Seeds: 16

Events
Singles	Doubles
- WTA Qatar Open

Two-time defending champion Iga Świątek defeated Elena Rybakina in the final, 7–6^{(10–8)}, 6–2 to win the singles tennis title at the 2024 WTA Qatar Open. Świątek did not lose a set en route to the title for the second consecutive year. It was her seventh WTA 1000 title and 18th WTA Tour title overall. Świątek became the first player to win three titles at the Qatar Open, and the first player to win three consecutive titles at the same hardcourt tournament since Serena Williams at the Miami Open between 2013 and 2015.

This marked the second time this century that all eight quarterfinalists at a WTA tournament had previously reached a major singles final. The last time this happened was also in Doha, during the 2013 Qatar Open.

== Seeds ==
The top eight seeds received a bye into the second round.

1. (Poland) Iga Świątek (champion)
2. (United States) Coco Gauff (second round)
3. (Kazakhstan) Elena Rybakina (final)
4. (Tunisia) Ons Jabeur (second round)
5. (China) Zheng Qinwen (third round)
6. (Czech Republic) Markéta Vondroušová (third round)
7. (Greece) Maria Sakkari (second round)
8. (Latvia) Jeļena Ostapenko (third round)

9. (Czech Republic) Barbora Krejčíková (withdrew)
10. (Brazil) Beatriz Haddad Maia (first round)
11. Daria Kasatkina (first round)
12. Liudmila Samsonova (first round)
13. Veronika Kudermetova (first round)
14. Ekaterina Alexandrova (third round)
15. (France) Caroline Garcia (first round)
16. (United States) Emma Navarro (third round)

Click on the seed number of a player to go to their draw section.

== Draw ==
Key

- Q = Qualifier
- WC = Wild card
- LL = Lucky loser
- Alt = Alternate
- ITF = ITF entry
- PR = Protected ranking
- SR = Special ranking
- SE = Special exempt
- JE = Junior exempt
- JR = Junior Accelerator Programme entrant
- CO = College Accelerator Programme entrant
- NG = Next Gen Accelerator Program entrant
- w/o = Walkover
- r = Retired
- d = Defaulted

=== Finals ===
Quarterfinals
1	(Poland) Iga Świątek	6	6
Victoria Azarenka	4	0
PR	(Japan) Naomi Osaka	6^{6}	6^{5}
(Czech Republic) Karolína Plíšková	7^{8}	7^{7}
(Canada) Leylah Fernandez	4	2
3	(Kazakhstan) Elena Rybakina	6	6
Anastasia Pavlyuchenkova	7	6
Q	(United States) Danielle Collins	5	4

Semifinals
1	(Poland) Iga Świątek	w/o
(Czech Republic) Karolína Plíšková
3	(Kazakhstan) Elena Rybakina	6	6
Anastasia Pavlyuchenkova	2	4

Final
1	(Poland) Iga Świątek	7^{10}	6
3	(Kazakhstan) Elena Rybakina	6^{8}	2

=== Top half ===
==== Section 1 ====
First round
(Romania) S Cîrstea	6	6
(United States) S Stephens	3	2
Q	E Andreeva	7^{7}	6
Q	D Shnaider	6^{2}	4
LL	(Bulgaria) V Tomova	6^{5}	3
14	E Alexandrova	7^{7}	6
10	(Brazil) B Haddad Maia	1	3
(China) Xin Wang	6	6
Q	(Poland) M Fręch	3	6	3
V Azarenka	6	3	6
WC	(United Kingdom) E Raducanu	0	6^{6}
(Ukraine) A Kalinina	6	7^{8}

Second round
1	(Poland) I Świątek	6	6
(Romania) S Cîrstea	1	1
Q	E Andreeva	0	6	1
14	E Alexandrova	6	3	6
(China) Xin Wang	6^{2}	2
V Azarenka	7^{7}	6
(Ukraine) A Kalinina	0	3
8	(Latvia) J Ostapenko	6	6

Third round
1	(Poland) I Świątek	6	6
14	E Alexandrova	1	4
V Azarenka	6	6
8	(Latvia) J Ostapenko	0	3

Quarterfinals
1	(Poland) I Świątek	6	6
V Azarenka	4	0

==== Section 2 ====
First round
(Ukraine) L Tsurenko	7	6
WC	(Turkey) Z Sönmez	5	3
(Netherlands) A Rus	5	6	6^{5}
(Croatia) P Martić	7	3	7^{7}
PR	(Japan) N Osaka	7	6
15	(France) C Garcia	5	4
LL	(Italy) M Trevisan	4	4
A Potapova	6	6
WC	A Kalinskaya	6	6^{3}	4
(Czech Republic) Ka Plíšková	2	7^{7}	6
Q	(United States) B Pera	3	6^{8}
(Czech Republic) L Nosková	6	7^{10}

Second round
4	(Tunisia) O Jabeur	3	2
(Ukraine) L Tsurenko	6	6
(Croatia) P Martić	3	6^{9}
PR	(Japan) N Osaka	6	7^{11}
A Potapova	1	7	4
(Czech Republic) Ka Plíšková	6	5	6
(Czech Republic) L Nosková	3	7^{7}	7
7	(Greece) M Sakkari	6	6^{2}	5

Third round
(Ukraine) L Tsurenko
PR	(Japan) N Osaka	w/o
(Czech Republic) Ka Plíšková	3	7	6
(Czech Republic) L Nosková	6	5	1

Quarterfinals
PR	(Japan) N Osaka	6^{6}	6^{5}
(Czech Republic) Ka Plíšková	7^{8}	7^{7}

=== Bottom half ===
==== Section 3 ====
First round
Q	(Japan) N Hibino	1	4
(Poland) M Linette	6	6
Q	(United States) A Krueger	3	6	4
WC	(Spain) P Badosa	6	4	6
(Canada) L Fernandez	7	7^{7}
12	L Samsonova	5	6^{4}
16	(United States) E Navarro	6	7
(Italy) J Paolini	3	5
(United States) P Stearns	2	3
(Belgium) E Mertens	6	6
(France) V Gracheva	1	1
(China) L Zhu	6	6

Second round
5	(China) Q Zheng	6	2	6
(Poland) M Linette	2	6	3
WC	(Spain) P Badosa	6	2	3
(Canada) L Fernandez	0	6	6
16	(United States) E Navarro	6	6
(Belgium) E Mertens	1	3
(China) L Zhu	2	1
3	(Kazakhstan) E Rybakina	6	6

Third round
5	(China) Q Zheng	5	3
(Canada) L Fernandez	7	6
16	(United States) E Navarro	1	7^{8}	4
3	(Kazakhstan) E Rybakina	6	6^{6}	6

Quarterfinals
(Canada) L Fernandez	4	2
3	(Kazakhstan) E Rybakina	6	6

==== Section 4 ====
First round
Q	(Belgium) G Minnen	6	6
(Germany) T Maria	1	1
(United States) C Dolehide	3	5
(Ukraine) M Kostyuk	6	7
A Pavlyuchenkova	6	7^{7}
11	D Kasatkina	2	6^{2}
13	V Kudermetova	5	3
Q	(United States) D Collins	7	6
(Czech Republic) M Bouzková	7	2	7
(United States) S Kenin	5	6	5
(Croatia) D Vekić	5	1
(Czech Republic) K Siniaková	7	6

Second round
6	(Czech Republic) M Vondroušová	6	0	6
Q	(Belgium) G Minnen	2	6	4
(Ukraine) M Kostyuk	1^{r}
A Pavlyuchenkova	2
Q	(United States) D Collins	6	7
(Czech Republic) M Bouzková	4	5
(Czech Republic) K Siniaková	6	6
2	(United States) C Gauff	2	4

Third round
6	(Czech Republic) M Vondroušová	5	3
A Pavlyuchenkova	7	6
Q	(United States) D Collins	6	6
(Czech Republic) K Siniaková	4	3

Quarterfinals
A Pavlyuchenkova	7	6
Q	(United States) D Collins	5	4

== Qualifying ==
=== Seeds ===
1. (Poland) Magdalena Fręch (qualified)
2. (Italy) Lucia Bronzetti (first round)
3. (Spain) Sara Sorribes Tormo (withdrew)
4. (Italy) Martina Trevisan (qualifying competition, lucky loser)
5. (France) Diane Parry (first round)
6. (China) Wang Xiyu (first round)
7. (Bulgaria) Viktoriya Tomova (qualifying competition, lucky loser)
8. (China) Yuan Yue (qualifying competition)
9. (Kazakhstan) Yulia Putintseva (first round)
10. (United States) Danielle Collins (qualified)
11. Diana Shnaider (qualified)
12. (Spain) Cristina Bucșa (withdrew, still playing in Abu Dhabi)
13. (Belgium) Greet Minnen (qualified)
14. (United States) Ashlyn Krueger (qualified)
15. Kamilla Rakhimova (qualifying competition)
16. (China) Bai Zhuoxuan (qualifying competition)

=== Qualifiers ===
1. (Poland) Magdalena Fręch
2. (United States) Danielle Collins
3. (Japan) Nao Hibino
4. (Belgium) Greet Minnen
5. Erika Andreeva
6. Diana Shnaider
7. (United States) Bernarda Pera
8. (United States) Ashlyn Krueger

=== Lucky losers ===
1. (Bulgaria) Viktoriya Tomova
2. (Italy) Martina Trevisan

=== Draw ===
==== First qualifier ====
First round
1	(Poland) Magdalena Fręch	2	6	7^{7}
WC	Maria Timofeeva	6	0	6^{5}
(United States) Alycia Parks	5	4
15	Kamilla Rakhimova	7	6

Qualifying competition
1	(Poland) Magdalena Fręch	6	6
15	Kamilla Rakhimova	2	2

==== Second qualifier ====
First round
2	(Italy) Lucia Bronzetti	6	4	3
(Germany) Laura Siegemund	4	6	6
(Australia) Kimberly Birrell	5	7^{8}	6^{2}
10	(United States) Danielle Collins	7	6^{6}	7^{7}

Qualifying competition
(Germany) Laura Siegemund	4	4
10	(United States) Danielle Collins	6	6

==== Third qualifier ====
First round
Alt	Ekaterina Makarova	2	2
WC	(Hungary) Tímea Babos	6	6
(Japan) Nao Hibino	6	6
Alt	(Japan) Mai Hontama	4	2

Qualifying competition
WC	(Hungary) Timea Babos	6	3	2
(Japan) Nao Hibino	4	6	6

==== Fourth qualifier ====
First round
4	(Italy) Martina Trevisan	6	7^{7}
Alt	(Germany) Anna-Lena Friedsam	2	6^{3}
(Spain) Rebeka Masarova	6	3	0
13	(Belgium) Greet Minnen	1	6	6

Qualifying competition
4	(Italy) Martina Trevisan	0	6^{5}
13	(Belgium) Greet Minnen	6	7^{7}

==== Fifth qualifier ====
First round
5	(France) Diane Parry	6^{5}	4
Erika Andreeva	7^{7}	6
WC	(Qatar) Mubaraka Al-Naimi	0	0
16	(China) Bai Zhuoxuan	6	6

Qualifying competition
Erika Andreeva	6	1	6
16	(China) Bai Zhuoxuan	4	6	3

==== Sixth qualifier ====
First round
6	(China) Wang Xiyu	5	2
Aliaksandra Sasnovich	7	6
(Australia) Arina Rodionova	6	4	2
11	Diana Shnaider	3	6	6

Qualifying competition
Aliaksandra Sasnovich	1	2
11	Diana Shnaider	6	6

==== Seventh qualifier ====
First round
7	(Bulgaria) Viktoriya Tomova	6	6
(Brazil) Laura Pigossi	4	0
(United States) Bernarda Pera	7^{13}	6
9	(Kazakhstan) Yulia Putintseva	6^{11}	4

Qualifying competition
7	(Bulgaria) Viktoriya Tomova	4	6^{5}
(United States) Bernarda Pera	6	7^{7}

==== Eighth qualifier ====
First round
8	(China) Yuan Yue	6	6
PR	(China) Zheng Saisai	2	1
WC	(Turkey) İpek Öz	5	2
14	(United States) Ashlyn Krueger	7	6

Qualifying competition
8	(China) Yuan Yue	1	2
14	(United States) Ashlyn Krueger	6	6
