= 2024 Credit One Charleston Open – Singles =

Singles
- 2024 Credit One Charleston Open

Final
- Champion: (United States) Danielle Collins
- Runner-up: Daria Kasatkina
- Score: 6–2, 6–1

Details
- Draw: 48
- Seeds: 16

Events
Singles	Doubles
← 2023 ·	Charleston Open	· 2025 →

Danielle Collins defeated Daria Kasatkina in the final, 6–2, 6–1 to win the women's singles tennis title at the 2024 Charleston Open. It was her second consecutive title, after the Miami Open, extending her winning streak to 13 matches. She became just the fourth woman, after Steffi Graf, Martina Hingis, and Serena Williams, to win back-to-back titles in Miami and Charleston.

Ons Jabeur was the defending champion, but lost to Collins in the second round. Jabeur was the only woman to win a set against Collins during the tournament.

== Seeds ==
All seeds received a bye into the second round.

1. (United States) Jessica Pegula (semifinals)
2. (Tunisia) Ons Jabeur (second round)
3. (Greece) Maria Sakkari (semifinals)
4. Daria Kasatkina (final)
5. (Brazil) Beatriz Haddad Maia (third round)
6. Ekaterina Alexandrova (second round)
7. (Ukraine) Elina Svitolina (third round)
8. (United States) Madison Keys (second round)
9. Veronika Kudermetova (quarterfinals)
10. (United States) Emma Navarro (third round)
11. (Belgium) Elise Mertens (quarterfinals)
12. Victoria Azarenka (quarterfinals)
13. (Ukraine) Dayana Yastremska (second round)
14. (Canada) Leylah Fernandez (second round)
15. (Ukraine) Anhelina Kalinina (third round)
16. (Ukraine) Lesia Tsurenko (second round)

== Draw ==
=== Key ===
- Q = Qualifier
- WC = Wild card
- LL = Lucky loser
- Alt = Alternate
- SE = Special exempt
- PR = Protected ranking
- ITF = ITF entry
- JE = Junior exempt
- w/o = Walkover
- r = Retired
- d = Defaulted
- SR = Special ranking

=== Finals ===
Quarterfinals
1	(United States) Jessica Pegula	6	3	7^{9}
12	Victoria Azarenka	4	6	6^{7}
4	Daria Kasatkina	6^{4}	6	6
(Romania) Jaqueline Cristian	7^{7}	2	3
9	Veronika Kudermetova	2	4
3	(Greece) Maria Sakkari	6	6
11	(Belgium) Elise Mertens	3	4
(United States) Danielle Collins	6	6

Semifinals
1	(United States) Jessica Pegula	4	6	6^{5}
4	Daria Kasatkina	6	4	7^{7}
3	(Greece) Maria Sakkari	3	3
(United States) Danielle Collins	6	6

Final
4	Daria Kasatkina	2	1
(United States) Danielle Collins	6	6

=== Top half ===
==== Section 1 ====
First round
(France) A Cornet	3	0
PR	(United States) A Anisimova	6	6
(Poland) M Linette	6	6
(Croatia) P Martić	3	4
(Italy) E Cocciaretto	2	6	7^{8}
(Romania) A Bogdan	6	1	6^{6}
(United States) T Townsend	6	6
(United States) S Kenin	3	3

Second round
1	(United States) J Pegula	3	6	7^{7}
PR	(United States) A Anisimova	6	4	6^{3}
(Poland) M Linette	0	6	6
13	(Ukraine) D Yastremska	6	4	3
12	V Azarenka	6	6
(Italy) E Cocciaretto	1	2
(United States) T Townsend	7	6
6	E Alexandrova	5	2

Third round
1	(United States) J Pegula	6	6
(Poland) M Linette	2	2
12	V Azarenka	6^{5}	6	6
(United States) T Townsend	7^{7}	3	4

Quarterfinals
1	(United States) J Pegula	6	3	7^{9}
12	V Azarenka	4	6	6^{7}

==== Section 2 ====
First round
(United States) A Krueger	7^{7}	6
Q	(Romania) G Lee	6^{0}	3
WC	(Denmark) C Wozniacki	6	6
LL	(United States) M Kessler	0	1
(Netherlands) A Rus	2	7^{8}	6^{6}
Q	(United States) K Volynets	6	6^{6}	7^{8}
Q	(United States) S Vickery	1	4
(Romania) J Cristian	6	6

Second round
4	D Kasatkina	6	0	6
(United States) A Krueger	3	6	1
WC	(Denmark) C Wozniacki	2	3
15	(Ukraine) A Kalinina	6	6
10	(United States) E Navarro	6	6
Q	(United States) K Volynets	1	1
(Romania) J Cristian	3	6	6
8	(United States) M Keys	6	3	3

Third round
4	D Kasatkina	6	6
15	(Ukraine) A Kalinina	1	4
10	(United States) E Navarro	3	7	1
(Romania) J Cristian	6	5	6

Quarterfinals
4	D Kasatkina	6^{4}	6	6
(Romania) J Cristian	7^{7}	2	3

=== Bottom half ===
==== Section 3 ====
First round
(United States) C Dolehide	6	0	6
(United States) K Day	3	6	4
Q	(United States) C Liu	1	1
WC	(United States) S Rogers	6	6
(Australia) Ar Rodionova	4	1
LL	(Australia) A Sharma	6	6
(Egypt) M Sherif	4	6	2
(Bulgaria) V Tomova	6	3	6

Second round
5/WC	(Brazil) B Haddad Maia	6	7
(United States) C Dolehide	2	5
WC	(United States) S Rogers	6^{5}	4
9	V Kudermetova	7^{7}	6
16	(Ukraine) L Tsurenko	4	0
LL	(Australia) A Sharma	6	6
(Bulgaria) V Tomova	3	3
3	(Greece) M Sakkari	6	6

Third round
5/WC	(Brazil) B Haddad Maia	5	1
9	V Kudermetova	7	6
LL	(Australia) A Sharma	4	1
3	(Greece) M Sakkari	6	6

Quarterfinals
9	V Kudermetova	2	4
3	(Greece) M Sakkari	6	6

==== Section 4 ====
First round
(Germany) T Korpatsch	4	6	2
Q	(Australia) D Saville	6	3	6
Q	(France) V Gracheva	6	6
WC	(United States) C Ngounoue	2	1
(Poland) M Fręch	0	2
(United States) S Stephens	6	6
(United States) D Collins	6	6
(Spain) P Badosa	1	4

Second round
7	(Ukraine) E Svitolina	6	6
Q	(Australia) D Saville	2	4
Q	(France) V Gracheva	4	6	2
11	(Belgium) E Mertens	6	3	6
14	(Canada) L Fernandez	4	4
(United States) S Stephens	6	6
(United States) D Collins	6	1	6
2	(Tunisia) O Jabeur	3	6	3

Third round
7	(Ukraine) E Svitolina	4	1
11	(Belgium) E Mertens	6	6
(United States) S Stephens	2	2
(United States) D Collins	6	6

Quarterfinals
11	(Belgium) E Mertens	3	4
(United States) D Collins	6	6

== Qualifying ==
=== Seeds ===
1. (France) Varvara Gracheva (qualified)
2. (Japan) Mai Hontama (first round)
3. (United States) Claire Liu (qualified)
4. (Australia) Daria Saville (qualified)
5. (United States) McCartney Kessler (qualifying competition, lucky loser)
6. (United States) Katie Volynets (qualified)
7. (United States) Elizabeth Mandlik (first round)
8. (United States) Sachia Vickery (qualified)
9. (Australia) Astra Sharma (qualifying competition, lucky loser)
10. (Czech Republic) Linda Fruhvirtová (qualifying competition)
11. (United Kingdom) Heather Watson (qualifying competition)
12. (United States) Ann Li (qualifying competition)

=== Qualifiers ===
1. (France) Varvara Gracheva
2. (Romania) Gabriela Lee
3. (United States) Claire Liu
4. (Australia) Daria Saville
5. (United States) Sachia Vickery
6. (United States) Katie Volynets

=== Lucky losers ===
1. (United States) McCartney Kessler
2. (Australia) Astra Sharma

=== Draw ===
==== First qualifier ====
First round
1	(France) Varvara Gracheva	4	6	6
(United States) Dalayna Hewitt	6	2	3
WC	(United States) Usue Maitane Arconada	7	7^{7}
7	(United States) Elizabeth Mandlik	5	6^{5}

Qualifying competition
1	(France) Varvara Gracheva	6	6
WC	(United States) Usue Maitane Arconada	2	4

==== Second qualifier ====
First round
2	(Japan) Mai Hontama	7	3	4
(Romania) Gabriela Lee	5	6	6
(United States) Jessie Aney	0	2
9	(Australia) Astra Sharma	6	6

Qualifying competition
(Romania) Gabriela Lee	6	6
9	(Australia) Astra Sharma	2	3

==== Third qualifier ====
First round
3	(United States) Claire Liu	6	4	7^{8}
(United States) Sophie Chang	3	6	6^{6}
WC	(United States) Nicole Melichar-Martinez	5	6	0
10	(Czech Republic) Linda Fruhvirtová	7	4	6

Qualifying competition
3	(United States) Claire Liu	3	6	6
10	(Czech Republic) Linda Fruhvirtová	6	4	3

==== Fourth qualifier ====
First round
4	(Australia) Daria Saville	6	6
(United States) Grace Min	1	2
(United States) Alana Smith	0	4
11	(United Kingdom) Heather Watson	6	6

Qualifying competition
4	(Australia) Daria Saville	6	6
11	(United Kingdom) Heather Watson	3	2

==== Fifth qualifier ====
First round
5	(United States) McCartney Kessler	6	6
(United States) Haley Giavara	2	1
(United States) Lauren Davis	2	3
8	(United States) Sachia Vickery	6	6

Qualifying competition
5	(United States) McCartney Kessler	6^{5}	3
8	(United States) Sachia Vickery	7^{7}	6

==== Sixth qualifier ====
First round
6	(United States) Katie Volynets	6	6
(Canada) Katherine Sebov	3	2
(United States) Robin Anderson	6^{9}	0
12	(United States) Ann Li	7^{11}	6

Qualifying competition
6	(United States) Katie Volynets	2	6	6
12	(United States) Ann Li	6	1	2
