= 2023 Coco Gauff tennis season =

Tennis season statistics

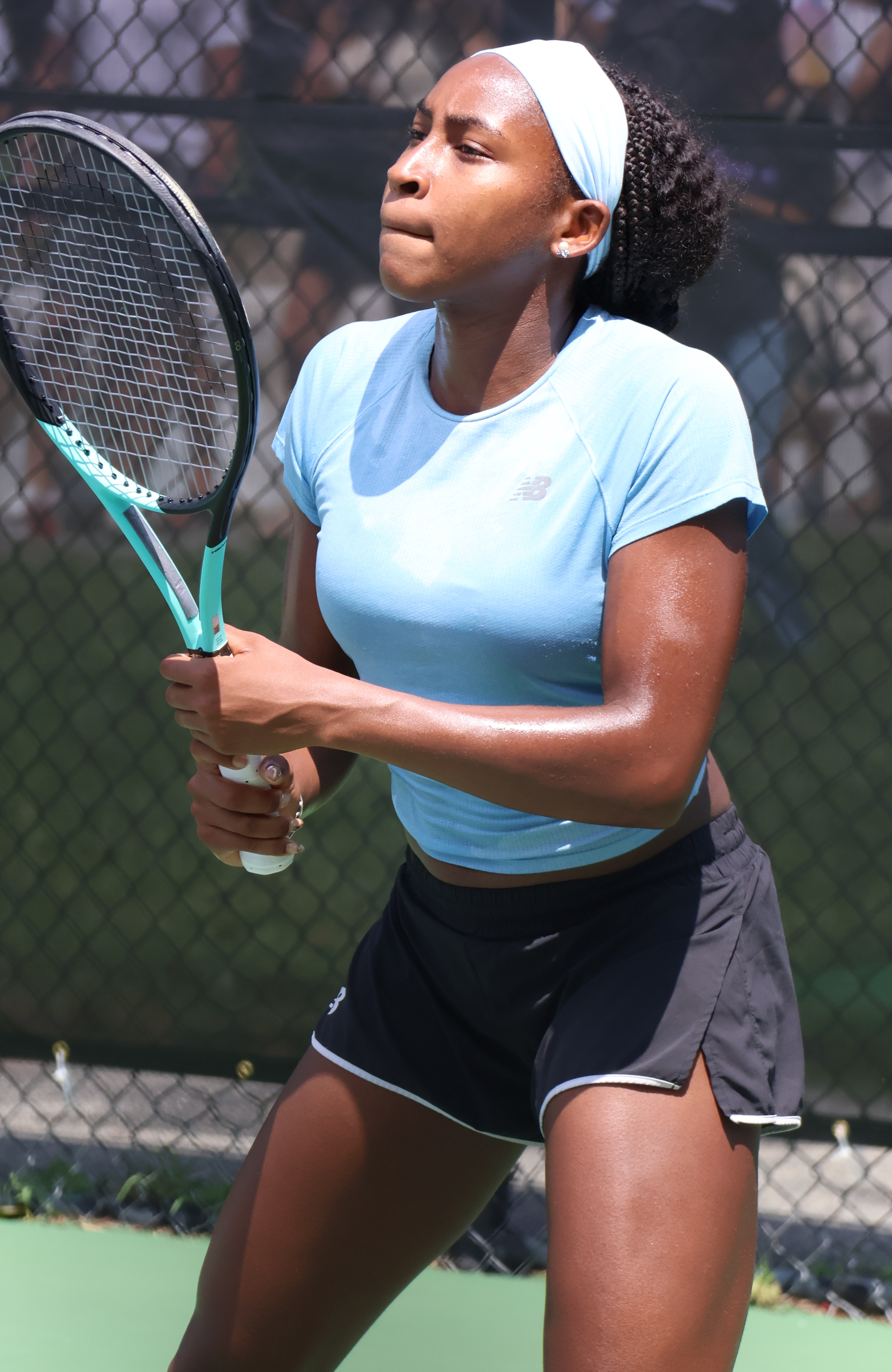
- Gauff at the 2023 Washington Open
- Full name: Cori Dionne "Coco" Gauff
- Country: United States
- Calendar prize money: $[[#Earnings|]]

Singles
- Season record: 51–16 (76%)
- Calendar titles: 4
- Year-end ranking: No. 3
- Ranking change from previous year: ▲4

Grand Slam & significant results
- Australian Open: 4R
- French Open: QF
- Wimbledon: 1R
- US Open: W
- Championships: SF

Doubles
- Season record: 36–12 (75%)
- Calendar titles: 2
- Year-end ranking: No. 3
- Ranking change from previous year: ▲1

Grand Slam doubles results
- Australian Open: SF
- French Open: SF
- Wimbledon: 3R
- US Open: QF
- WTA Championships: RR
- Last updated on: 7 August 2025.

The 2023 Coco Gauff tennis season officially began on 2 January 2023, with the start of the Auckland Classic in Auckland.

== All matches ==
This table chronicles all the matches of Coco Gauff in 2023.

Key
W	F	SF	QF	#R	RR	Q#	P#	DNQ	A	Z#	PO	G	S	B	NMS	NTI	P	NH

(W) winner; (F) finalist; (SF) semifinalist; (QF) quarterfinalist; (#R) rounds 4, 3, 2, 1; (RR) round-robin stage; (Q#) qualification round; (P#) preliminary round; (DNQ) did not qualify; (A) absent; (Z#) Davis/Fed Cup Zonal Group (with number indication) or (PO) play-off; (G) gold, (S) silver or (B) bronze Olympic/Paralympic medal; (NMS) not a Masters tournament; (NTI) not a Tier I tournament; (P) postponed; (NH) not held; (SR) strike rate (events won / competed); (W–L) win–loss record.
To avoid confusion and double counting, these charts are updated at the conclusion of a tournament or when the player's participation has ended.

=== Singles matches ===
Tournament	Match	Round	Opponent	Rank	Result	Score
WTA Auckland Open; Auckland, New Zealand; WTA 250; Hard, outdoor; 2 January 2023 – 8 January 2023	1	1R	(Germany) Tatjana Maria	68	Win	6–4, 6–1
WTA Auckland Open; Auckland, New Zealand; WTA 250; Hard, outdoor; 2 January 2023 – 8 January 2023	2	2R	(United States) Sofia Kenin (WC)	227	Win	6–4, 6–4
WTA Auckland Open; Auckland, New Zealand; WTA 250; Hard, outdoor; 2 January 2023 – 8 January 2023	3	QF	(China) Lin Zhu	84	Win	6–3, 6–2
WTA Auckland Open; Auckland, New Zealand; WTA 250; Hard, outdoor; 2 January 2023 – 8 January 2023	4	SF	(Montenegro) Danka Kovinic (7)	60	Win	6–0, 6–2
WTA Auckland Open; Auckland, New Zealand; WTA 250; Hard, outdoor; 2 January 2023 – 8 January 2023	5	W	(Switzerland) Rebeka Masarova (Q)	57	Win (1)	6–1, 6–1
Australian Open; Melbourne, Australia; Grand Slam; Hard, outdoor; 16 January 2023 – 29 January 2023	6	1R	(Czech Republic) Kateřina Siniaková	46	Win	6–1, 6–4
Australian Open; Melbourne, Australia; Grand Slam; Hard, outdoor; 16 January 2023 – 29 January 2023	7	2R	(United Kingdom) Emma Raducanu	77	Win	6–3, 7–6^{(7–4)}
Australian Open; Melbourne, Australia; Grand Slam; Hard, outdoor; 16 January 2023 – 29 January 2023	8	3R	(United States) Bernarda Pera	41	Win	6–3, 6–2
Australian Open; Melbourne, Australia; Grand Slam; Hard, outdoor; 16 January 2023 – 29 January 2023	9	4R	(Latvia) Jeļena Ostapenko (17)	17	Loss	5–7, 3–6
Dubai Championships; Dubai, UAE; WTA 1000; Hard, outdoor; 15 February 2026 – 21 February 2026	–	1R	Bye			
Dubai Championships; Dubai, UAE; WTA 1000; Hard, outdoor; 15 February 2026 – 21 February 2026	10	2R	(Czech Republic) Petra Kvitová	21	Win	6–3, 7–6^{(8–6)}
Dubai Championships; Dubai, UAE; WTA 1000; Hard, outdoor; 15 February 2026 – 21 February 2026	11	QF	(United States) Veronika Kudermetova	46	Loss	2–6, 6–3, 1–6
Dubai Tennis Championships; Dubai, United Arab Emirates; WTA 1000; Hard, outdoor; 19 February 2023 – 25 February 2023	–	1R	Bye			
Dubai Tennis Championships; Dubai, United Arab Emirates; WTA 1000; Hard, outdoor; 19 February 2023 – 25 February 2023	12	2R	Aliaksandra Sasnovich	43	Win	6–0, 6–4
Dubai Tennis Championships; Dubai, United Arab Emirates; WTA 1000; Hard, outdoor; 19 February 2023 – 25 February 2023	13	3R	(Kazakhstan) Elena Rybakina (9)	10	Win	w/o
Dubai Tennis Championships; Dubai, United Arab Emirates; WTA 1000; Hard, outdoor; 19 February 2023 – 25 February 2023	14	QF	(United States) Madison Keys	23	Win	6–2, 7–5
Dubai Tennis Championships; Dubai, United Arab Emirates; WTA 1000; Hard, outdoor; 19 February 2023 – 25 February 2023	15	SF	(Poland) Iga Świątek (1)	1	Loss	4–6, 2–6
Indian Wells Open; Indian Wells, United States; WTA 1000; Hard, outdoor; 8 March 2023 – 19 March 2023	–	1R	Bye			
Indian Wells Open; Indian Wells, United States; WTA 1000; Hard, outdoor; 8 March 2023 – 19 March 2023	16	2R	(Spain) Cristina Bucsa (Q)	90	Win	6–2, 6–4
Indian Wells Open; Indian Wells, United States; WTA 1000; Hard, outdoor; 8 March 2023 – 19 March 2023	17	3R	(Czech Republic) Linda Noskova	54	Win	6–4, 6–3
Indian Wells Open; Indian Wells, United States; WTA 1000; Hard, outdoor; 8 March 2023 – 19 March 2023	18	4R	(Sweden) Rebecca Peterson (Q)	103	Win	6–3, 1–6, 6–4
Indian Wells Open; Indian Wells, United States; WTA 1000; Hard, outdoor; 8 March 2023 – 19 March 2023	19	QF	Aryna Sabalenka (2)	2	Loss	4–6, 0–6
Miami Open; Miami Gardens, United States; WTA 1000; Hard, outdoor; 21 March 2023 – 2 April 2023	–	1R	Bye			
Miami Open; Miami Gardens, United States; WTA 1000; Hard, outdoor; 21 March 2023 – 2 April 2023	20	2R	(Canada) Rebecca Marino	83	Win	6–4, 6–3
Miami Open; Miami Gardens, United States; WTA 1000; Hard, outdoor; 21 March 2023 – 2 April 2023	21	3R	Anastasia Potapova (27)	26	Loss	7–6^{(10–8)}, 5–7, 2–6
Stuttgart Open; Stuttgart, Germany; WTA 500; Clay, indoor; 17 April 2023 – 23 April 2023	22	1R	Veronika Kudermetova	13	Win	6–2, 4–6, 7–6^{(7–3)}
Stuttgart Open; Stuttgart, Germany; WTA 500; Clay, indoor; 17 April 2023 – 23 April 2023	23	2R	(Ukraine) Anastasia Potapova	24	Loss	2–6, 3–6
Madrid Open; Madrid, Spain; WTA 1000; Clay, outdoor; 25 April 2023 – 7 May 2023	–	1R	Bye			
Madrid Open; Madrid, Spain; WTA 1000; Clay, outdoor; 25 April 2023 – 7 May 2023	24	2R	(Spain) Irene Burillo (Q)	318	Win	6–4, 6–1
Madrid Open; Madrid, Spain; WTA 1000; Clay, outdoor; 25 April 2023 – 7 May 2023	25	3R	(Spain) Paula Badosa (26)	42	Loss	3–6, 0–6
Italian Open; Rome, Italy; WTA 1000; Clay, outdoor; 9 May 2023 – 20 May 2023	–	1R	Bye			
Italian Open; Rome, Italy; WTA 1000; Clay, outdoor; 9 May 2023 – 20 May 2023	26	2R	(Kazakhstan) Yulia Putintseva	51	Win	6–0, 6–1
Italian Open; Rome, Italy; WTA 1000; Clay, outdoor; 9 May 2023 – 20 May 2023	27	3R	(Czech Republic) Marie Bouzkova (27)	38	Loss	6–4, 2–6, 2–6
French Open; Paris, France; Grand Slam; Clay, outdoor; 28 May 2023 – 11 June 2023	28	1R	(Switzerland) Rebeka Masarova	71	Win	3–6, 6–1, 6–2
French Open; Paris, France; Grand Slam; Clay, outdoor; 28 May 2023 – 11 June 2023	29	2R	(Austria) Julia Grabher	61	Win	6–2, 6–3
French Open; Paris, France; Grand Slam; Clay, outdoor; 28 May 2023 – 11 June 2023	30	3R	Mirra Andreeva (Q)	143	Win	6–7^{(5–7)}, 6–1, 6–1
French Open; Paris, France; Grand Slam; Clay, outdoor; 28 May 2023 – 11 June 2023	31	4R	(Slovakia) Anna Karolina Schmiedlova	100	Win	7–5, 6–2
French Open; Paris, France; Grand Slam; Clay, outdoor; 28 May 2023 – 11 June 2023	32	QF	(Poland) Iga Świątek (1)	1	Loss	4–6, 2–6
German Open; Berlin, Germany; WTA 500; Grass, outdoor; 17 June 2024 – 23 June 2024	33	1R	(Czech Republic) Kateřina Siniaková	54	Win	6–3, 6–4
German Open; Berlin, Germany; WTA 500; Grass, outdoor; 17 June 2024 – 23 June 2024	34	2R	Ekaterina Alexandrova	22	Loss	4–6, 0–6
Eastbourne International; Eastbourne, United Kingdom; WTA 500; Grass, outdoor; 26 June 2023 – 1 July 2023	35	1R	(United States) Bernarda Pera	27	Win	6–3, 6–2
Eastbourne International; Eastbourne, United Kingdom; WTA 500; Grass, outdoor; 26 June 2023 – 1 July 2023	36	2R	(United Kingdom) Jodie Burrage (LL)	128	Win	6–1, 6–1
Eastbourne International; Eastbourne, United Kingdom; WTA 500; Grass, outdoor; 26 June 2023 – 1 July 2023	37	QF	(United States) Jessica Pegula (3)	4	Win	6–3, 6–3
Eastbourne International; Eastbourne, United Kingdom; WTA 500; Grass, outdoor; 26 June 2023 – 1 July 2023	38	SF	(United States) Madison Keys	25	Loss	3–6, 3–6
Wimbledon; London, United Kingdom; Grand Slam; Grass, outdoor; 3 July 2023 – 16 July 2023	39	1R	(United States) Sofia Kenin (Q)	128	Loss	4–6, 6–4, 2–6
Mubadala Citi DC Open; Washington, D.C., United States; WTA 500; Hard, outdoor; 31 July 2023 – 6 August 2023	–	1R	Bye			
Mubadala Citi DC Open; Washington, D.C., United States; WTA 500; Hard, outdoor; 31 July 2023 – 6 August 2023	40	2R	(United States) Hailey Baptiste (Q)	204	Win	6–1, 6–4
Mubadala Citi DC Open; Washington, D.C., United States; WTA 500; Hard, outdoor; 31 July 2023 – 6 August 2023	41	QF	(Switzerland) Belinda Bencic (6)	15	Win	6–1, 6–2
Mubadala Citi DC Open; Washington, D.C., United States; WTA 500; Hard, outdoor; 31 July 2023 – 6 August 2023	42	SF	Ludmilla Samsonova (8)	18	Win	6–3, 6–3
Mubadala Citi DC Open; Washington, D.C., United States; WTA 500; Hard, outdoor; 31 July 2023 – 6 August 2023	43	W	(Greece) Maria Sakkari (4)	9	Win (2)	6–2, 6–3
Canadian Open; Toronto, Canada; WTA 1000; Hard, outdoor; 7 August 2023 – 13 August 2023	–	1R	Bye			
Canadian Open; Toronto, Canada; WTA 1000; Hard, outdoor; 7 August 2023 – 13 August 2023	44	2R	(United Kingdom) Katie Boulter (Q)	72	Win	6–2, 6–2
Canadian Open; Toronto, Canada; WTA 1000; Hard, outdoor; 7 August 2023 – 13 August 2023	45	3R	(Czech Republic) Marketa Vondrousova (9)	10	Win	6–3, 6–0
Canadian Open; Toronto, Canada; WTA 1000; Hard, outdoor; 7 August 2023 – 13 August 2023	46	QF	(United States) Jessica Pegula (4)	3	Loss	2–6, 7–5, 5–7
Cincinnati Open; Mason, United States; WTA 1000; Hard, outdoor; 14 August 2023 – 20 August 2023	–	1R	Bye			
Cincinnati Open; Mason, United States; WTA 1000; Hard, outdoor; 14 August 2023 – 20 August 2023	47	2R	(Egypt) Mayar Sherif	33	Win	6–2, 6–2
Cincinnati Open; Mason, United States; WTA 1000; Hard, outdoor; 14 August 2023 – 20 August 2023	48	3R	(Czech Republic) Linda Noskova (Q)	50	Win	6–4, 6–0
Cincinnati Open; Mason, United States; WTA 1000; Hard, outdoor; 14 August 2023 – 20 August 2023	49	QF	(Italy) Jasmine Paolini (Q)	43	Win	6–3, 6–2
Cincinnati Open; Mason, United States; WTA 1000; Hard, outdoor; 14 August 2023 – 20 August 2023	50	SF	(Poland) Iga Świątek (1)	1	Win	7–6^{(7–2)}, 3–6, 6–4
Cincinnati Open; Mason, United States; WTA 1000; Hard, outdoor; 14 August 2023 – 20 August 2023	51	W	(Czech Republic) Karolina Muchova	17	Win (3)	6–3, 6–4
US Open; New York City, United States; Grand Slam; Hard, outdoor; 28 August 2023 – 10 September 2023	52	1R	(Germany) Laura Siegemund (Q)	121	Win	3–6, 6–2, 6–4
US Open; New York City, United States; Grand Slam; Hard, outdoor; 28 August 2023 – 10 September 2023	53	2R	Mirra Andreeva	63	Win	6–3, 6–2
US Open; New York City, United States; Grand Slam; Hard, outdoor; 28 August 2023 – 10 September 2023	54	3R	(Belgium) Elise Mertens (32)	32	Win	3–6, 6–3, 6–0
US Open; New York City, United States; Grand Slam; Hard, outdoor; 28 August 2023 – 10 September 2023	55	4R	(Denmark) Caroline Wozniacki (WC)	623	Win	6–3, 3–6, 6–1
US Open; New York City, United States; Grand Slam; Hard, outdoor; 28 August 2023 – 10 September 2023	56	QF	(Latvia) Jeļena Ostapenko (20)	21	Win	6–0, 6–2
US Open; New York City, United States; Grand Slam; Hard, outdoor; 28 August 2023 – 10 September 2023	57	SF	(Czech Republic) Karolina Muchova (10)	10	Win	6–4, 7–5
US Open; New York City, United States; Grand Slam; Hard, outdoor; 28 August 2023 – 10 September 2023	58	W	Aryna Sabalenka	2	Win (4)	2–6, 6–3, 6–2
China Open; Beijing, China; WTA 1000; Hard, outdoor; 30 September 2023– 8 October 2023	59	1R	Ekaterina Alexandrova	20	Win	7–5, 6–3
China Open; Beijing, China; WTA 1000; Hard, outdoor; 30 September 2023– 8 October 2023	60	2R	(Croatia) Petra Martić	48	Win	7–5, 5–7, 7–6^{(7–2)}
China Open; Beijing, China; WTA 1000; Hard, outdoor; 30 September 2023– 8 October 2023	61	3R	Veronika Kudermetova (16)	16	Win	7–6^{(7–5)}, 6–2
China Open; Beijing, China; WTA 1000; Hard, outdoor; 30 September 2023– 8 October 2023	62	QF	(Greece) Maria Sakkari (6)	6	Win	6–2, 6–4
China Open; Beijing, China; WTA 1000; Hard, outdoor; 30 September 2023– 8 October 2023	63	SF	(Poland) Iga Świątek (2)	2	Loss	2–6, 3–6
WTA Finals; Cancún, Mexico; Year-end championships; Hard, indoor; 29 October 2023 – 6 November 2023	64	RR	(Czech Republic) Marketa Vondrousova (7)	7	Win	5–7, 7–6^{(7–4)}, 6–3
WTA Finals; Cancún, Mexico; Year-end championships; Hard, indoor; 29 October 2023 – 6 November 2023	65	RR	(Tunisia) Ons Jabeur (6)	6	Win	6–0, 6–1
WTA Finals; Cancún, Mexico; Year-end championships; Hard, indoor; 29 October 2023 – 6 November 2023	66	RR	(Poland) Iga Świątek (2)	2	Loss	0–6, 5–7
WTA Finals; Cancún, Mexico; Year-end championships; Hard, indoor; 29 October 2023 – 6 November 2023	67	SF	(United States) Jessica Pegula (Note: Russian and Belarus players are not allowed to compete under the name or flag of their country following the Russian invasion of Ukraine.) (5)	5	Loss	2–6, 1–6

=== Doubles matches ===
Tournament	Match	Round	Opponent	Result	Score	
Australian Open; Melbourne, Australia; Grand Slam; Hard, outdoor; 16 January 2023 – 29 January 2023; Partner: (United States) Jessica Pegula	1	1R	(Czech Republic) Tereza Martincova / (Croatia) Donna Vekić		Win	7–6^{(7–2)}, 3–6, 6–2
Australian Open; Melbourne, Australia; Grand Slam; Hard, outdoor; 16 January 2023 – 29 January 2023; Partner: (United States) Jessica Pegula	2	2R	(Japan) Moyuka Uchijima / (China) Xinyu Wang		Win	7–5, 6–1
Australian Open; Melbourne, Australia; Grand Slam; Hard, outdoor; 16 January 2023 – 29 January 2023; Partner: (United States) Jessica Pegula	3	3R	(Japan) Miyu Kato / (Indonesia) Aldila Sutjiadi		Win	6–4, 6–2
Australian Open; Melbourne, Australia; Grand Slam; Hard, outdoor; 16 January 2023 – 29 January 2023; Partner: (United States) Jessica Pegula	4	QF	(United States) Caroline Dolehide / (United States) Desirae Krawczyk		Win	7–6^{(12–10)}, 6–2
Australian Open; Melbourne, Australia; Grand Slam; Hard, outdoor; 16 January 2023 – 29 January 2023; Partner: (United States) Jessica Pegula	5	SF	(United States) Asia Muhammad / (Japan) Ena Shibahara		Loss	2–6, 4–6
Indian Wells Open; Indian Wells, United States; WTA 1000; Hard, outdoor; 6 March 2024 – 17 March 2024; Partner: (United States) Jessica Pegula	1	1R	(United States) Sofia Kenin / (United States) Bethanie Mattek-Sands (WC)	105 / 40	Win	7–5, 6–3
Indian Wells Open; Indian Wells, United States; WTA 1000; Hard, outdoor; 6 March 2024 – 17 March 2024; Partner: (United States) Jessica Pegula	2	2R	(United States) Caroline Dolehide / (United States) Desirae Krawczyk	30 / 16	Win	7–6^{(12–10)}, 6–2
Indian Wells Open; Indian Wells, United States; WTA 1000; Hard, outdoor; 6 March 2024 – 17 March 2024; Partner: (United States) Jessica Pegula	3	QF	(United States) Asia Muhammad / (Japan) Ena Shibahara	61 / 21	Loss	2–6, 4–6
Miami Open; Miami Gardens, United States; WTA 1000; Hard, outdoor; 19 March 2024 – 31 March 2024; Partner: (United States) Jessica Pegula	4	1R	(United States) Ashlyn Krueger / (United States) Sloane Stephens (WC)	194 / 403	Loss	3–6, 6–1, [8–10]
Madrid Open; Madrid, Spain; WTA 1000; Clay, outdoor; 23 April 2024 – 5 May 2024; Partner: (United States) Taylor Townsend	5	1R	(Hungary) Anna Bondár / (Slovakia) Tereza Mihalíková	95 / 64	Win	6–3, 3–6, [10–7]
Madrid Open; Madrid, Spain; WTA 1000; Clay, outdoor; 23 April 2024 – 5 May 2024; Partner: (United States) Taylor Townsend	6	2R	(United States) Sofia Kenin / (United States) Bethanie Mattek-Sands	46 / 24	Win	6–2, 4–6, [10–8]
Madrid Open; Madrid, Spain; WTA 1000; Clay, outdoor; 23 April 2024 – 5 May 2024; Partner: (United States) Taylor Townsend	7	QF	(Czech Republic) Barbora Krejčíková / (Germany) Laura Siegemund (6)	32 / 6	Loss	4–6, 4–6
Italian Open; Rome, Italy; WTA 1000; Clay, outdoor; 8 May 2024 – 19 May 2024; Partner: (New Zealand) Erin Routliffe	8	1R	Anna Blinkova / Liudmila Samsonova	299 / 97	Win	4–6, 6–3, [10–4]
Italian Open; Rome, Italy; WTA 1000; Clay, outdoor; 8 May 2024 – 19 May 2024; Partner: (New Zealand) Erin Routliffe	9	2R	Mirra Andreeva / Vera Zvonareva	278 / 9	Win	6–2, 6–3
Italian Open; Rome, Italy; WTA 1000; Clay, outdoor; 8 May 2024 – 19 May 2024; Partner: (New Zealand) Erin Routliffe	10	QF	(Czech Republic) Kateřina Siniaková / (United States) Taylor Townsend (5)	12 / 13	Win	6–3, 7–6^{(7–3)}
Italian Open; Rome, Italy; WTA 1000; Clay, outdoor; 8 May 2024 – 19 May 2024; Partner: (New Zealand) Erin Routliffe	11	SF	(China) Wang Xinyu / (China) Zheng Saisai (PR)	20 / 259	Win	6–3, 7–6^{(7–3)}
Italian Open; Rome, Italy; WTA 1000; Clay, outdoor; 8 May 2024 – 19 May 2024; Partner: (New Zealand) Erin Routliffe	12	F	(Italy) Sara Errani / (Italy) Jasmine Paolini	49 / 39	Loss	3–6, 6–4, [8–10]
French Open; Paris, France; Grand Slam; Clay, outdoor; 20 May 2024 – 9 June 2024; Partner: (Czech Republic) Kateřina Siniaková	13	1R	(Kazakhstan) Anna Danilina / (China) Xu Yifan	59 / 44	Win	6–3, 6–0
French Open; Paris, France; Grand Slam; Clay, outdoor; 20 May 2024 – 9 June 2024; Partner: (Czech Republic) Kateřina Siniaková	14	2R	(Czech Republic) Miriam Kolodziejová / (Czech Republic) Anna Sisková (Alt)	75 / 78	Win	6–1, 6–2
French Open; Paris, France; Grand Slam; Clay, outdoor; 20 May 2024 – 9 June 2024; Partner: (Czech Republic) Kateřina Siniaková	15	3R	(Japan) Ena Shibahara / (China) Wang Xinyu (10)	24 / 16	Win	6–4, 6–4
French Open; Paris, France; Grand Slam; Clay, outdoor; 20 May 2024 – 9 June 2024; Partner: (Czech Republic) Kateřina Siniaková	16	QF	(Japan) Miyu Kato / (Ukraine) Nadiia Kichenok (16)	37 / 46	Win	6–0, 6–2
French Open; Paris, France; Grand Slam; Clay, outdoor; 20 May 2024 – 9 June 2024; Partner: (Czech Republic) Kateřina Siniaková	17	SF	(United States) Caroline Dolehide / (United States) Desirae Krawczyk (8)	23 / 14	Win	6–3, 7–6^{(7–3)}
French Open; Paris, France; Grand Slam; Clay, outdoor; 20 May 2024 – 9 June 2024; Partner: (Czech Republic) Kateřina Siniaková	18	W	(Italy) Sara Errani / (Italy) Jasmine Paolini (11)	28 / 26	Win (1)	7–6^{(7–5)}, 6–3
German Open; Berlin, Germany; WTA 500; Grass, outdoor; 17 June 2024 – 23 June 2024; Partner: (United States) Jessica Pegula	19	1R	(Czech Republic) Linda Nosková / (Czech Republic) Kateřina Siniaková	90 / 5	Loss	4–6, 0–6
Wimbledon; London, United Kingdom; Grand Slam; Grass, outdoor; 1 July 2024 – 14 July 2024; Partner: (United States) Jessica Pegula	20	1R	(Ukraine) Anhelina Kalinina / (Ukraine) Dayana Yastremska	103 / 212	Win	7–5, 6–7^{(7–9)}, 7–5
Wimbledon; London, United Kingdom; Grand Slam; Grass, outdoor; 1 July 2024 – 14 July 2024; Partner: (United States) Jessica Pegula	21	2R	(Kazakhstan) Anna Danilina / (China) Xu Yifan	52 / 53	Win	6–2, 7–6^{(7–3)}
Wimbledon; London, United Kingdom; Grand Slam; Grass, outdoor; 1 July 2024 – 14 July 2024; Partner: (United States) Jessica Pegula	22	3R	(Italy) Sara Errani / (Italy) Jasmine Paolini (5)	16 / 13	Win	6–2, 6–4
Wimbledon; London, United Kingdom; Grand Slam; Grass, outdoor; 1 July 2024 – 14 July 2024; Partner: (United States) Jessica Pegula	23	QF	(Chinese Taipei) Hsieh Su-wei / (Belgium) Elise Mertens (1)	2 / 1	Loss	2–6, 1–6
Summer Olympics; Paris, France; Olympic Games; Clay, outdoor; 27 July 2024 – 4 August 2024; Partner: (United States) Jessica Pegula	24	1R	(Australia) Ellen Perez / (Australia) Daria Saville	10 / 155	Win	6–3, 6–1
Summer Olympics; Paris, France; Olympic Games; Clay, outdoor; 27 July 2024 – 4 August 2024; Partner: (United States) Jessica Pegula	25	2R	(Czech Republic) Karolína Muchová / (Czech Republic) Linda Nosková	578 / 82	Loss	6–2, 4–6, [4–10]

== Tournament schedule ==
Key
W	F	SF	QF	#R	RR

(W) winner; (F) finalist; (SF) semifinalist; (QF) quarterfinalist; (#R) rounds 4, 3, 2, 1; (RR) round-robin stage.

=== Singles schedule ===
Date	Tournament	Location	Category	Surface	Prev. result	Prev. points	New points	Outcome
2 January 2023 – 8 January 2023	WTA Auckland Open	New Zealand	WTA 250	Hard	A	–	280	Winner defeated (Switzerland) Rebeka Masarova; 6–1, 6–1
16 January 2023– 29 January 2023	Australian Open	Australia	Grand Slam	Hard	1R	10	240	Fourth round lost to (Latvia) Jeļena Ostapenko; 5–7, 3–6
13 February 2023– 18 February 2023	Qatar Open	Qatar	WTA 1000	Hard	QF	190	100	Quarterfinal lost to Veronika Kudermetova; 2–6, 6–3, 1–6
19 February 2023– 25 February 2023	Dubai Tennis Championships	UAE	WTA 1000	Hard	1R	10	350	Semifinal lost to (Poland) Iga Świątek; 4–6, 2–6
8 March 2023 – 19 March 2023	Indian Wells Open	United States	WTA 1000	Hard	3R	65	215	Quarterfinal lost to Aryna Sabalenka; 4–6, 0–6
21 March 2023 – 2 April 2023	Miami Open	United States	WTA 1000	Hard	4R	120	65	Third round lost to Anastasia Potapova; 7–6^{(10–8)}, 5–7, 2–6
17 April 2023 – 23 April 2023	Stuttgart Open	Germany	WTA 500	Clay (i)	1R	10	55	Second round lost to Anastasia Potapova; 2–6, 3–6
25 April 2023 – 7 May 2023	Madrid Open	Spain	WTA 1000	Clay	3R	120	65	Third round lost to (Spain) Paula Badosa 3–6, 0–6
9 May 2023 – 20 May 2023	Italian Open	Italy	WTA 100	Clay	3R	105	65	Third round lost to (Czech Republic) Marie Bouzkova; 6–4, 2–6, 2–6
28 May 2023 – 11 June 2023	French Open	France	Grand Slam	Clay	F	1300	430	Quarterfinal lost to (Poland) Iga Świątek; 4–6, 2–6
19 June 2023 – 25 June 2023	German Open	Germany	WTA 500	Grass	SF	185	55	Second round lost to Ekaterina Alexandrova; 4–6, 0–6
26 June 2023 – 1 July 2023	Eastbourne International	Germany	WTA 500	Grass	A	–	185	Semifinal lost to (United States) Madison Keys; 3–6, 3–6
3 July 2023 – 16 July 2023	Wimbledon Championships	United Kingdom	Grand Slam	Grass	3R	130	10	First round lost to (United States) Sofia Kenin; 4–6, 6–4, 2–6
31 July 2023 – 6 August 2023	Mubadala Citi DC Open	United States	WTA 500	Clay	A	–	470	Winner defeated (Greece) Maria Sakkari; 6–2, 6–3
7 August 2023 – 13 August 2023	Canadian Open	Canada	WTA 1000	Hard	QF	190	190	Quarterfinal lost to (United States) Jessica Pegula; 2–6, 7–5, 5–7
14 August 2023 – 20 August 2023	Cincinnati Open	United States	WTA 1000	Hard	1R	10	1000	Winner defeated (Czech Republic) Karolina Muchova; 6–3, 6–4
28 August 2023 – 10 September 2023	US Open	United States	Grand Slam	Hard	QF	430	2000	Winner defeated Aryna Sabalenka; 2–6, 6–3, 6–2
30 September 2023 – 8 October 2023	China Open	China	WTA 1000	Hard	NH	–	390	Semifinal lost to (Poland) Iga Świątek; 2–6, 3–6
29 October 2023 – 6 November 2023	WTA Finals	Mexico	WTA Finals	Hard	RR	375	625	Semifinal lost to (United States) Jessica Pegula; 2–6, 1–6
Total year-end points							6855	▲ (difference)

== Yearly records ==
=== Head-to-head match-ups ===
Gauff has a 51–16 (76%) WTA match win–loss record in the 2024 season. Her record against players who were part of the WTA rankings top ten at the time of their meetings is 9–7 (56%). Bold indicates player was ranked top 10 at the time of at least one meeting. The following list is ordered by number of wins:

- **(Greece) Maria Sakkari** 2–0
- (Switzerland) Rebeka Masarova 2–0
- (Czech Republic) Kateřina Siniaková 2–0
- (United States) Bernarda Pera 2–0
- (Czech Republic) Linda Noskova 2–0
- **(Czech Republic) Karolína Muchová** 2–0
- Mirra Andreeva 2–0
- **(Czech Republic) Marketa Vondrousova** 2–0
- (United States) Hailey Baptiste 1–0
- (Belgium) Elise Mertens 1–0
- Ludmilla Samsonova 1–0
- (Switzerland) Belinda Bencic 1–0
- (Spain) Cristina Bucsa 1–0
- (Germany) Laura Siegemund 1–0
- **(Tunisia) Ons Jabeur** 1–0
- (Montenegro) Danka Kovinic 1–0
- (United Kingdom) Katie Boulter 1–0
- (Slovakia) Anna Karolína Schmiedlová 1–0
- (Denmark) Caroline Wozniacki 1–0
- (Czech Republic) Karolína Plíšková 1–0
- (Italy) Jasmine Paolini 1–0
- (Canada) Rebecca Marino 1–0
- (China) Yuan Yue 1–0
- (Sweden) Rebecca Peterson 1–0
- (Egypt) Mayar Sherif 1–0
- (Austria) Julia Grabher 1–0
- (Croatia) Petra Martić 1–0
- Aliaksandra Sasnovich 1–0
- (United Kingdom) Emma Raducanu 1–0
- (China) Lin Zhu 1–0
- (Germany) Tatjana Maria 1–0
- (United Kingdom) Jodie Burrage 1–0
- (Spain) Irene Burillo 1–0
- (Poland) Linda Klimovičová 1–0
- (Kazakhstan) Yulia Putintseva 1–0
- (Czech Republic) Petra Kvitová 1–0
- Veronika Kudermetova 2–1
- **Aryna Sabalenka** 1–1
- (Latvia) Jeļena Ostapenko 1–1
- (United States) Sofia Kenin 1–1
- (United States) Madison Keys 1–1
- Ekaterina Alexandrova 1–1
- (Czech Republic) Marie Bouzkova 0–1
- (Spain) Paula Badosa 0–1
- **(United States) Jessica Pegula** 1–2
- Anastasia Potapova 0–2
- **(Poland) Iga Świątek** 1–4

=== Top 10 record ===
Result	W–L	Opponent	Rk	Tournament	Surface	Rd	Score	Rk	Ref
Loss	0–1	(Poland) Iga Świątek	1	Dubai Tennis Championships, United Arab Emirates	Hard	SF	4–6, 2–6	6	
Loss	0–2	Aryna Sabalenka	2	Indian Wells Open, USA	Hard	QF	4–6, 0–6	6	
Loss	0–3	(Poland) Iga Świątek	1	French Open, France	Clay	QF	4–6, 2–6	6	
Win	1–3	(United States) Jessica Pegula	4	Eastbourne International, Great Britain	Grass	QF	6–3, 6–3	7	
Win	2–3	(Greece) Maria Sakkari	9	Mubadala DC Citi Open, United States	Hard	F	6–2, 6–3	7	
Win	3–3	(Czech Republic) Marketa Vondrousova	10	Canadian Open, Canada	Hard	3R	6–3, 6–0	7	
Loss	3–4	(United States) Jessica Pegula	3	Canadian Open, Canada	Hard	QF	2–6, 7–5, 5–7	7	
Win	4–4	(Poland) Iga Świątek	1	Cincinnati Open, United States	Hard	SF	7–6^{(7–2)}, 3–6, 6–4	7	
Win	5–4	(Czech Republic) Karolina Muchova	10	US Open, United States	Hard	SF	6–4, 7–5	6	
Win	6–4	Aryna Sabalenka	2	US Open, United States	Hard	F	2–6, 6–3, 6–2	6	
Win	7–4	(Greece) Maria Sakkari	6	China Open, China	Hard	QF	6–2, 6–4	3	
Loss	7–5	(Poland) Iga Świątek	2	China Open, China	Hard	SF	2–6, 3–6	3	
Win	8–5	(Tunisia) Ons Jabeur	7	WTA Finals, Saudi Arabia	Hard (i)	RR	6–0, 6–1	3	
Win	9–5	(Czech Republic) Marketa Vondrousova	6	WTA Finals, Saudi Arabia	Hard (i)	RR	5–7, 7–6^{(7–4)}, 6–3	3	
Loss	9–6	(Poland) Iga Świątek	2	WTA Finals, Saudi Arabia	Hard (i)	RR	0–6, 5–7	3	
Loss	9–7	(United States) Jessica Pegula	2	WTA Finals, Saudi Arabia	Hard (i)	SF	2–6, 1–6	3	

- Key: (Rk) first use, opponent rank; (Rd) round; (Rk) 2nd use, player rank; (Ref) reference; (F) final; (SF) semifinal; (QF) quarterfinal; (#R) rounds 4, 3, 2, 1; (RR) round-robin stage; (Q#) qualifying rounds or stages (3), 2, 1.

=== Finals ===
==== Singles: 4 (4 titles) ====
Legend Grand Slams (1–0) WTA 1000 (1–0) WTA 500 (1–0) WTA 250 (1–0)	Finals by surface Hard (4–0)

Result	W–L	Date	Tournament	Tier	Surface	Opponent	Score
Win	1–0	Jan 2023	Auckland Classic, New Zealand	WTA 250	Hard	(Switzerland) Rebeka Masarova	6–1, 6–1
Win	2–0	Aug 2023	Mubadala Citi DC Open, United States	WTA 500	Hard	(Greece) Maria Sakkari	6–2, 6–3
Win	3–0	Aug 2023	Cincinnati Open, United States	WTA 1000	Hard	(Czech Republic) Karolína Muchová	6–3, 6–4
Win	4–0	Sep 2023	US Open, United States	Grand Slam	Hard	Aryna Sabalenka	2–6, 6–3, 6–2

==== Doubles: 4 (2 title, 2 runner-up) ====
Legend WTA 1000 (2–2)	Finals by surface Hard (2–0) Clay (0–2)

Result	W–L	Date	Tournament	Tier	Surface	Partner	Opponents	Score
Win	1–0	Feb 2023	Qatar Open, Qatar	WTA 1000	Hard	(United States) Jessica Pegula	(Ukraine) Lyudmyla Kichenok (Latvia) Jeļena Ostapenko	6–4, 2–6, [10–7]
Win	2–0	Mar 2023	Miami Open, USA	WTA 1000	Hard	(United States) Jessica Pegula	(Canada) Leylah Fernandez (United States) taylor Townsend	7–6^{(8–6)}, 6–2
Loss	2–1	May 2023	Madrid Open, Spain	WTA 1000	Clay	(United States) Jessica Pegula	Victoria Azarenka (Brazil) Beatriz Haddad Maia	1–6, 4–6
Loss	2–2	May 2023	Italian Open, Italy	WTA 1000	Clay	(United States) Jessica Pegula	(Australia) Storm Hunter (Belgium) Elise Mertens	4–6, 4–6

=== Earnings ===
- **Bold** font denotes tournament win

**Singles**
Event	Prize money	Year-to-date
**WTA Auckland Open**	**$34,228**	$34,228
Australian Open	A$338,250	$270,806
Qatar Open	$21,075	$291,881
Dubai Tennis Championships	$130,000	$429,881
Indian Wells Open	$184,465	$614,346
Miami Open	$55,770	$670,116
Stuttgart Open	$10,086	$680,202
Madrid Open	€48,835	$729,037
Italian Open	€22,700	$751,737
French Open	€400,000	$1,151,737
Berlin Ladies Open	$10,086	$1,161,823
Eastbourne International	$43,323	$1,205,146
Wimbledon Championships	£55,000	$1,274,761
**Mubadala Citi DC Open**	**$120,150**	$1,394,911
Canadian Open	$63,350	$1,458,261
**Cincinnati Open**	**$454,500**	$1,912,761
**US Open**	**$3,000,000**	$4,912,761
China Open	$402,000	$5,314,761
WTA Finals	$648,000	$5,962,761
		$5,962,761
**Doubles**
Event	Prize money	Year-to-date
Australian Open	A$105,000	$73,439
**Qatar Open**	**$20,050**	$93,489
2023 Dubai Tennis Championships	$10,457	$103,946
Indian Wells Open	$16,730	$120,676
**Miami Open**	**$218,635**	$339,041
Madrid Open	€101,425	$440,466
Italian Open	€48,215	$488,681
French Open	€74,000	$562,681
Eastbourne International	$6,950	$569,631
Wimbledon Championships	€22,952	$592,583
Canadian Open	$10,457	$603,040
US Open	$50,000	$653,040
China Open	17,250	670,290
WTA Finals	$45,000	$715,290
		$715,290
**Total**
		**$6,678,051**

Figures in United States dollars (USD) unless noted.

== See also ==
- 2024 Iga Świątek tennis season
- 2024 Aryna Sabalenka tennis season
- 2024 Elena Rybakina tennis season
