= 2023 ASB Classic – Women's doubles =

Women's doubles
- 2023 ASB Classic

Final
- Champions: (Japan) Miyu Kato (Indonesia) Aldila Sutjiadi
- Runners-up: (Canada) Leylah Fernandez (United States) Bethanie Mattek-Sands
- Score: 1–6, 7–5, [10–4]

Details
- Draw: 16
- Seeds: 4

Events
Singles	men	women
Doubles	men	women
← 2020 ·	WTA Auckland Open	· 2024 →

Asia Muhammad and Taylor Townsend were the reigning champions from 2020, when the event was last held, but chose to compete in Adelaide instead.

Miyu Kato and Aldila Sutjiadi defeated Leylah Fernandez and Bethanie Mattek-Sands in the final, 1–6, 7–5, [10–4] to win the women's doubles tennis title at the 2023 ASB Classic.

== Seeds ==
1. (United States) Caroline Dolehide / (New Zealand) Erin Routliffe (first round)
2. (Japan) Eri Hozumi / (Slovenia) Tamara Zidanšek (first round)
3. (Japan) Miyu Kato / (Indonesia) Aldila Sutjiadi (champions)
4. (United States) Sophie Chang / (United States) Angela Kulikov (first round)

== Draw ==
=== Key ===
- Q = Qualifier
- WC = Wild card
- LL = Lucky loser
- Alt = Alternate
- SE = Special exempt
- PR = Protected ranking
- ITF = ITF entry
- JE = Junior exempt
- w/o = Walkover
- r = Retired
- d = Defaulted
- SR = Special ranking

=== Draw ===
First round
1	(United States) C Dolehide (New Zealand) E Routliffe	5	4
(Mexico) F Contreras Gómez (United States) C Harrison	7	6
(Slovakia) V Kužmová (Netherlands) A Rus	7^{7}	6^{2}	[10]
(United States) M Brengle (Canada) R Marino	6^{3}	7^{7}	[8]
3	(Japan) M Kato (Indonesia) A Sutjiadi	6	4	[10]
(Australia) M Adamczak (Australia) A Osborne	4	6	[7]
(Czech Republic) T Martincová (Romania) E-G Ruse	7	6
WC	(New Zealand) P Hourigan (United States) S Vickery	5	3
(Japan) N Hibino (Australia) O Tjandramulia	5	1
(Chinese Taipei) L Chan (Chile) A Guarachi	7	6
(Brazil) I Gamarra Martins (United States) I Neel	6	4	[10]
4	(United States) S Chang (United States) A Kulikov	3	6	[6]
WC	(Canada) L Fernandez (United States) B Mattek-Sands	7	1	[10]
(Spain) A Bolsova (Spain) R Masarova	5	6	[5]
Alt	(Italy) E Cocciaretto (China) Xin Wang	6	6
2	(Japan) E Hozumi (Slovenia) T Zidanšek	4	4

Quarterfinals
(Mexico) F Contreras Gómez (United States) C Harrison	6	4	[7]
(Slovakia) V Kužmová (Netherlands) A Rus	1	6	[10]
3	(Japan) M Kato (Indonesia) A Sutjiadi	6	7
(Czech Republic) T Martincová (Romania) E-G Ruse	3	5
(Chinese Taipei) L Chan (Chile) A Guarachi	6	6
(Brazil) I Gamarra Martins (United States) I Neel	3	4
WC	(Canada) L Fernandez (United States) B Mattek-Sands	w/o
Alt	(Italy) E Cocciaretto (China) Xin Wang

Semifinals
(Slovakia) V Kužmová (Netherlands) A Rus	4	6	[8]
3	(Japan) M Kato (Indonesia) A Sutjiadi	6	4	[10]
(Chinese Taipei) L Chan (Chile) A Guarachi	6	3	[5]
WC	(Canada) L Fernandez (United States) B Mattek-Sands	2	6	[10]

Final
3	(Japan) M Kato (Indonesia) A Sutjiadi	1	7	[10]
WC	(Canada) L Fernandez (United States) B Mattek-Sands	6	5	[4]
