= 2023 ASB Classic =

- Date: 2 – 8 January 2023 (women); 9 – 14 January 2023 (men)
- Edition: 36th (women); 45th (men)
- Category: WTA 250; ATP 250
- Draw: 32S / 16D (women); 28S / 16D (men)
- Surface: Hard
- Location: Auckland, New Zealand
- Venue: ASB Tennis Centre

Champions

Men's singles
- (France) Richard Gasquet

Women's singles
- (United States) Coco Gauff

Men's doubles
- (Croatia) Nikola Mektić / (Croatia) Mate Pavić

Women's doubles
- (Japan) Miyu Kato / (Indonesia) Aldila Sutjiadi
← 2020 ·	Auckland Open	· 2024 →

The 2023 Auckland Open (sponsored by ASB Bank) was a joint professional men's and women's tennis tournament played on outdoor hard courts at the ASB Tennis Centre in Auckland. The 36th edition of the women's event (a WTA 250 tournament) was held from 2 to 8 January 2023 and the 45th edition of the men's event (an ATP 250 tournament) were scheduled from 9 to 14 January 2023. The event was the first to be organized since 2020, after the COVID-19 pandemic forced the cancellation of the 2021 and 2022 tournaments.

== Finals ==
=== Men's singles ===
- (France) Richard Gasquet defeated (United Kingdom) Cameron Norrie, 4–6, 6–4, 6–4

=== Women's singles ===
- (United States) Coco Gauff defeated (Spain) Rebeka Masarova 6–1, 6–1

=== Men's doubles ===
- (Croatia) Nikola Mektić / (Croatia) Mate Pavić defeated (United States) Nathaniel Lammons / (United States) Jackson Withrow, 6–4, 6–7^{(5–7)}, [10–6]

=== Women's doubles ===
- (Japan) Miyu Kato / (Indonesia) Aldila Sutjiadi defeated (Canada) Leylah Fernandez / (United States) Bethanie Mattek-Sands 1–6, 7–5, [10–4]

== Points and prize money ==
=== Point distribution ===
Event	W	F	SF	QF	Round of 16	Round of 32	Q	Q3	Q2	Q1
Men's Singles	250	150	90	45	20	0	12	6	0	—
Men's Doubles	250	150	90	45	0	—	—	—	—	—
Women's Singles	280	180	110	60	30	1	18	14	10	1
Women's Doubles	280	180	110	60	1	—	—	—	—	—

=== Prize money ===
Event	W	F	SF	QF	Round of 16	Round of 32^{1}	Q3	Q2	Q1
Men's Singles	$89,435	$47,105	$25,515	$14,535	$8,565	$5,075	$2,285	$1,145	—
Men's Doubles *	$27,170	$14,280	$7,740	$4,430	$2,590	—	—	—	—
Women's Singles	$43,000	$21,400	$11,300	$5,900	$3,310	$1,925	$1,005	$730	$530
Women's Doubles *	$12,300	$6,400	$3,435	$1,820	$960	—	—	—	—
Doubles prize money per team

_{^{1} Qualifiers' prize money is also the Round of 32 prize money}

== ATP singles main draw entrants ==
=== Seeds ===
Country	Player	Rank^{1}	Seed
NOR	Casper Ruud	3	1
GBR	Cameron Norrie	14	2
ARG	Diego Schwartzman	25	3
~~ARG~~	~~Francisco Cerúndolo~~	~~30~~	~~4~~
KAZ	Alexander Bublik	37	5
USA	John Isner	41	6
ARG	Sebastián Báez	43	7
FRA	Adrian Mannarino	46	8

- ^{1} Rankings as of 2 January 2023.

=== Other entrants ===
The following players received wildcards into the singles main draw:

- (France) Ugo Humbert
- (New Zealand) Kiranpal Pannu
- (United States) Ben Shelton

The following players received entry from the qualifying draw:

- (France) Grégoire Barrère
- (United States) Christopher Eubanks
- (Czech Republic) Jiří Lehečka
- (Brazil) Thiago Monteiro

The following players received entry as lucky losers:

- (Argentina) Federico Coria
- (Portugal) João Sousa

=== Withdrawals ===
- (Argentina) Francisco Cerúndolo → replaced by (Portugal) João Sousa
- (Spain) Pedro Martínez → replaced by (Argentina) Federico Coria
- (Denmark) Holger Rune → replaced by (United States) J. J. Wolf

== ATP doubles main draw entrants ==
=== Seeds ===
Country	Player	Country	Player	Rank^{1}	Seed
CRO	Nikola Mektić	CRO	Mate Pavić	13	1
ESP	Marcel Granollers	ARG	Horacio Zeballos	31	2
ITA	Simone Bolelli	ITA	Fabio Fognini	44	3
GBR	Jamie Murray	NZL	Michael Venus	52	4

- ^{1} Rankings as of 2 January 2023.

=== Other entrants ===
The following pairs received wildcards into the doubles main draw:

- (United States) Alex Lawson / (New Zealand) Artem Sitak
- (New Zealand) Ajeet Rai / (New Zealand) Finn Reynolds

The following pair received entry as alternates:

- (Argentina) Sebastián Báez / (Venezuela) Luis David Martínez

=== Withdrawals ===
Before the tournament

- (Spain) Pedro Martínez / (Spain) Jaume Munar → replaced by (Argentina) Sebastián Báez / (Venezuela) Luis David Martínez

During the tournament

- (Argentina) Pedro Cachin / (Argentina) Francisco Cerúndolo
- (United States) Rajeev Ram / (United Kingdom) Joe Salisbury

== WTA singles main draw entrants ==
=== Seeds ===
Country	Player	Rank^{1}	Seed
USA	Coco Gauff	7	1
USA	Sloane Stephens	37	2
CAN	Leylah Fernandez	40	3
USA	Bernarda Pera	44	4
CHN	Wang Xiyu	50	5
USA	Madison Brengle	57	6
MNE	Danka Kovinić	60	7
CAN	Rebecca Marino	63	8

- ^{1} Rankings as of 26 December 2022.

=== Other entrants ===
The following players received wildcards into the singles main draw:

- (Czech Republic) Brenda Fruhvirtová
- (United States) Sofia Kenin
- (New Zealand) Erin Routliffe
- (United States) Venus Williams

The following player received a protected ranking into the singles main draw:

- (Czech Republic) Karolína Muchová

The following players received entry from the qualifying draw:

- (Belgium) Ysaline Bonaventure
- (Japan) Nao Hibino
- (Slovakia) Viktória Kužmová
- (Spain) Rebeka Masarova
- (Romania) Elena-Gabriela Ruse
- (United States) Katie Volynets

=== Retirements ===
- (United Kingdom) Emma Raducanu (twisted ankle)
- (China) Wang Xiyu (sickness)

== WTA doubles main draw entrants ==
=== Seeds ===
Country	Player	Country	Player	Rank^{1}	Seed
USA	Caroline Dolehide	NZL	Erin Routliffe	63	1
JPN	Eri Hozumi	SLO	Tamara Zidanšek	84	2
JPN	Miyu Kato	INA	Aldila Sutjiadi	96	3
USA	Sophie Chang	USA	Angela Kulikov	121	4

- ^{1} Rankings as of 26 December 2022.

=== Other entrants ===
The following pairs received wildcards into the doubles main draw:

- (Canada) Leylah Fernandez / (United States) Bethanie Mattek-Sands
- (New Zealand) Paige Hourigan / (United States) Sachia Vickery

The following pair received entry as alternates:

- (Italy) Elisabetta Cocciaretto / (China) Wang Xinyu

=== Withdrawals ===
Before the tournament

- (Australia) Monique Adamczak / (Netherlands) Rosalie van der Hoek → replaced by (Australia) Monique Adamczak / (Australia) Alexandra Osborne
- (China) Wang Xiyu / (China) Zhu Lin → replaced by (Italy) Elisabetta Cocciaretto / (China) Wang Xinyu

During the tournament

- (Italy) Elisabetta Cocciaretto / (China) Wang Xinyu (sickness)
