= 2024 ASB Classic – Men's singles =

Men's singles
- 2024 ASB Classic

Final
- Champion: (Chile) Alejandro Tabilo
- Runner-up: (Japan) Taro Daniel
- Score: 6–2, 7–5

Details
- Draw: 28 (4 Q / 3 WC )
- Seeds: 8

Events
| Singles | men | women |
| Doubles | men | women |
| ← 2023 · | ATP Auckland Open | · 2025 → |

Alejandro Tabilo defeated Taro Daniel in the final, 6–2, 7–5 to win the men's singles tennis title at the 2024 ASB Classic. It was his first ATP Tour title, and he became the first qualifier to win an ATP Tour title since Juan Manuel Cerúndolo in 2021.

Richard Gasquet was the defending champion, but lost in the first round to Arthur Fils.

== Seeds ==
The top four seeds received a bye into the second round.

1. (United States) Ben Shelton (semifinals)
2. (United Kingdom) Cameron Norrie (quarterfinals, withdrew)
3. (Argentina) Francisco Cerúndolo (second round)
4. (Canada) Félix Auger-Aliassime (second round)
5. (United States) Christopher Eubanks (first round)
6. (France) Arthur Fils (semifinals)
7. (Austria) Sebastian Ofner (second round)
8. (Australia) Max Purcell (second round)

== Draw ==
=== Key ===
- Q = Qualifier
- WC = Wild card
- LL = Lucky loser
- Alt = Alternate
- ITF = ITF entry
- PR = Protected ranking
- SR = Special ranking
- SE = Special exempt
- JE = Junior exempt
- JR = Junior Accelerator Programme entrant
- CO = College Accelerator Programme entrant
- NG = Next Gen Accelerator Program entrant
- w/o = Walkover
- r = Retired
- d = Defaulted

=== Finals ===
Semifinals
1 | (United States) Ben Shelton | 5 | 6^{9}
(Japan) Taro Daniel | 7 | 7^{11}
6 | (France) Arthur Fils | 2 | 5
Q | (Chile) Alejandro Tabilo | 6 | 7

Final
(Japan) Taro Daniel | 2 | 5
Q | (Chile) Alejandro Tabilo | 6 | 7

=== Top half ===
First round
(Hungary) F Marozsán | 6 | 6^{6} | 7^{7}
(France) G Monfils | 4 | 7^{8} | 6^{4}
(Spain) R Bautista Agut | 4 | 3
(Spain) R Carballés Baena | 6 | 6
WC | (Canada) D Shapovalov | 4 | 2
7 | (Austria) S Ofner | 6 | 6
Q | (France) A Müller | 6 | 7
(France) B Bonzi | 3 | 5
(Australia) A Vukic | 5 | 5
(Japan) T Daniel | 7 | 7
WC | (New Zealand) K Pannu | 4 | 4
8 | (Australia) M Purcell | 6 | 6

Second round
1 | (United States) B Shelton | 6 | 6
(Hungary) F Marozsán | 3 | 4
(Spain) R Carballés Baena | 7 | 6
7 | (Austria) S Ofner | 5 | 3
3 | (Argentina) F Cerúndolo | 1 | 1
Q | (France) A Müller | 6 | 6
(Japan) T Daniel | 6 | 6
8 | (Australia) M Purcell | 2 | 4

Quarterfinals
1 | (United States) B Shelton | 6 | 6
(Spain) R Carballés Baena | 4 | 3
Q | (France) A Müller | 4 | 7^{7} | 3
(Japan) T Daniel | 6 | 6^{3} | 6

Semifinals
1 | (United States) B Shelton | 5 | 6^{9}
(Japan) T Daniel | 7 | 7^{11}

=== Bottom half ===
First round
6 | (France) A Fils | 6 | 6
WC | (France) R Gasquet | 3 | 4
Q | (United States) A Michelsen | 6 | 6^{6} | 3
(Portugal) N Borges | 0 | 7^{8} | 6
(Germany) D Altmaier | 7^{7} | 6
(United States) M Giron | 6^{5} | 2
5 | (United States) C Eubanks | 6^{5} | 2
(Netherlands) B van de Zandschulp | 7^{7} | 6
(Croatia) B Gojo | 6 | 3 | 2
Q | (Chile) A Tabilo | 1 | 6 | 6
(United States) JJ Wolf | 4 | 2
Q | (France) L Van Assche | 6 | 6

Second round
6 | (France) A Fils | 6 | 6
(Portugal) N Borges | 2 | 0
(Germany) D Altmaier | 7^{11} | 7
4 | (Canada) F Auger-Aliassime | 6^{9} | 5
(Netherlands) B van de Zandschulp | 5 | 3
Q | (Chile) A Tabilo | 7 | 6
Q | (France) L Van Assche | 3 | 7^{8} | 1
2 | (United Kingdom) C Norrie | 6 | 6^{6} | 6

Quarterfinals
6 | (France) A Fils | 7^{7} | 1
(Germany) D Altmaier | 6^{2} | 0^{r}
Q | (Chile) A Tabilo | w/o
2 | (United Kingdom) C Norrie

Semifinals
6 | (France) A Fils | 2 | 5
Q | (Chile) A Tabilo | 6 | 7

== Qualifying ==
=== Seeds ===
1. (France) Benjamin Bonzi (moved to main draw)
2. (Japan) Taro Daniel (moved to main draw)
3. (France) Alexandre Müller (qualified)
4. (Chile) Cristian Garín (withdrew)
5. (France) Grégoire Barrère (first round)
6. (Chile) Alejandro Tabilo (qualified)
7. (Spain) Jaume Munar (qualifying competition)
8. (France) Constant Lestienne (qualifying competition)

=== Qualifiers ===
1. (United States) Alex Michelsen
2. (Chile) Alejandro Tabilo
3. (France) Alexandre Müller
4. (France) Luca Van Assche

=== Qualifying draw ===
==== First qualifier ====
First round
Alt | (Australia) Blake Mott | 5 | 2
WC | (New Zealand) Jack Loutit | 7 | 6
(United States) Alex Michelsen | 6 | 6
5 | (France) Grégoire Barrère | 2 | 2

Qualifying competition
WC | (New Zealand) Jack Loutit | 3 | 3
(United States) Alex Michelsen | 6 | 6

==== Second qualifier ====
First round
Alt | (Australia) Jake Delaney | 1 | 4
(United States) Patrick Kypson | 6 | 6
WC | (New Zealand) Isaac Becroft | 0 | 1
6 | (Chile) Alejandro Tabilo | 6 | 6

Qualifying competition
(United States) Patrick Kypson | 6^{3} | 3
6 | (Chile) Alejandro Tabilo | 7^{7} | 6

==== Third qualifier ====
First round
3 | (France) Alexandre Müller | 6 | 6
Alt | (Croatia) Nino Serdarušić | 3 | 4
Alt | (New Zealand) Alexander Klintcharov | 0 | 2
8 | (France) Constant Lestienne | 6 | 6

Qualifying competition
3 | (France) Alexandre Müller | 6 | 2 | 6
8 | (France) Constant Lestienne | 4 | 6 | 4

==== Fourth qualifier ====
First round
Alt | (New Zealand) Artem Sitak | 1 | 1
(France) Luca Van Assche | 6 | 6
PR | (Czech Republic) Jiří Veselý | 2 | 6^{2}
7 | (Spain) Jaume Munar | 6 | 7^{7}

Qualifying competition
(France) Luca Van Assche | 3 | 7^{7} | 6
7 | (Spain) Jaume Munar | 6 | 6^{5} | 2
