= 2024 ASB Classic – Women's singles =

Women's singles
- 2024 ASB Classic

Final
- Champion: (United States) Coco Gauff
- Runner-up: (Ukraine) Elina Svitolina
- Score: 6–7^{(4–7)}, 6–3, 6–3

Details
- Draw: 32 (6 Q / 4 WC )
- Seeds: 8

Events
Singles	men	women
Doubles	men	women
← 2023 ·	WTA Auckland Open	· 2025 →

Defending champion Coco Gauff defeated Elina Svitolina in the final, 6–7^{(4–7)}, 6–3, 6–3, to win the women's singles tennis title at the 2024 WTA Auckland Open. It was her seventh career title and first since winning the 2023 US Open. This was the first time in her career that Gauff successfully defended a WTA Tour singles title.

This tournament marked the return to professional tennis of both Emma Raducanu and Amanda Anisimova, who both had not played a professional match in nine months. Both players lost in the second round, Raducanu to Svitolina and Anisimova to Marie Bouzková.

== Seeds ==
1. (United States) Coco Gauff (champion)
2. (Ukraine) Elina Svitolina (final)
3. (Ukraine) Lesia Tsurenko (second round)
4. (United States) Emma Navarro (semifinals)
5. (Czech Republic) Marie Bouzková (quarterfinals)
6. (China) Wang Xinyu (second round)
7. (Croatia) Petra Martić (quarterfinals)
8. (France) Varvara Gracheva (quarterfinals)

== Draw ==
=== Key ===
- Q = Qualifier
- WC = Wild card
- LL = Lucky loser
- Alt = Alternate
- ITF = ITF entry
- PR = Protected ranking
- SR = Special ranking
- SE = Special exempt
- JE = Junior exempt
- JR = Junior Accelerator Programme entrant
- CO = College Accelerator Programme entrant
- NG = Next Gen Accelerator Program entrant
- w/o = Walkover
- r = Retired
- d = Defaulted

=== Finals ===
Semifinals
1	(United States) Coco Gauff	6	6
4	(United States) Emma Navarro	3	1
(China) Wang Xiyu	6	4	3
2	(Ukraine) Elina Svitolina	2	6	6

Final
1	(United States) Coco Gauff	6^{4}	6	6
2	(Ukraine) Elina Svitolina	7^{7}	3	3

=== Top half ===
First round
1	(United States) C Gauff	6	6
(United States) C Liu	4	2
A Blinkova	5	4
Q	(Czech Republic) B Fruhvirtová	7	6
Q	(United States) M Kessler	4	3
Q	(Switzerland) L Sun	6	6
Q	(Czech Republic) T Martincová	7^{7}	5	2
8	(France) V Gracheva	6^{3}	7	6
4	(United States) E Navarro	2	6	6
(Czech Republic) L Fruhvirtová	6	4	2
E Avanesyan	7^{8}	6
WC	(New Zealand) M Barry	6^{6}	2
(China) Y Yuan	7^{7}	6^{5}	6
(United States) K Day	6^{1}	7^{7}	1
(Spain) R Masarova	6	3	3
7	(Croatia) P Martić	3	6	6

Second round
1	(United States) C Gauff	6	6
Q	(Czech Republic) B Fruhvirtová	3	0
Q	(Switzerland) L Sun	3	4
8	(France) V Gracheva	6	6
4	(United States) E Navarro	6	6
E Avanesyan	1	2
(China) Y Yuan	2	2
7	(Croatia) P Martić	6	6

Quarterfinals
1	(United States) C Gauff	6	6
8	(France) V Gracheva	1	1
4	(United States) E Navarro	6	6
7	(Croatia) P Martić	4	3

Semifinals
1	(United States) C Gauff	6	6
4	(United States) E Navarro	3	1

=== Bottom half ===
First round
6	(China) Xin Wang	6	7
(Kazakhstan) Y Putintseva	4	5
(Romania) J Cristian	1	7	6^{3}
(China) Xiy Wang	6	5	7^{7}
(France) D Parry	6^{4}	7	6
(United States) E Bektas	7^{7}	5	3
Q	(United States) S Vickery	5	4
3	(Ukraine) L Tsurenko	7	6
5	(Czech Republic) M Bouzková	6	3	6
(Poland) M Fręch	0	6	4
WC	(United States) A Anisimova	7	6
A Pavlyuchenkova	5	4
Q	(Romania) E-G Ruse	3	6	5
WC	(United Kingdom) E Raducanu	6	4	7
WC	(Denmark) C Wozniacki	4	3
2	(Ukraine) E Svitolina	6	6

Second round
6	(China) Xin Wang	3	6	6^{2}
(China) Xiy Wang	6	3	7^{7}
(France) D Parry	2	6	6
3	(Ukraine) L Tsurenko	6	4	1
5	(Czech Republic) M Bouzková	6	6
WC	(United States) A Anisimova	0	1
WC	(United Kingdom) E Raducanu	7^{7}	6^{3}	1
2	(Ukraine) E Svitolina	6^{5}	7^{7}	6

Quarterfinals
(China) Xiy Wang	6^{3}	6	6
(France) D Parry	7^{7}	3	4
5	(Czech Republic) M Bouzková	0	3
2	(Ukraine) E Svitolina	6	6

Semifinals
(China) Xiy Wang	6	4	3
2	(Ukraine) E Svitolina	2	6	6

== Qualifying ==
=== Seeds ===
1. (Czech Republic) Brenda Fruhvirtová (qualified)
2. (Romania) Elena-Gabriela Ruse (qualified)
3. (France) Jessika Ponchet (first round)
4. (Slovakia) Viktória Hrunčáková (qualifying competition)
5. (United States) Sachia Vickery (qualified)
6. (Czech Republic) Tereza Martincová (qualified)
7. (Germany) Jule Niemeier (qualifying competition)
8. (Japan) Himeno Sakatsume (qualifying competition)
9. (France) Carole Monnet (qualifying competition)
10. (Australia) Destanee Aiava (first round)
11. (Chinese Taipei) Yang Ya-yi (qualifying competition)
12. (Netherlands) Suzan Lamens (qualifying competition)

=== Qualifiers ===
1. (Czech Republic) Brenda Fruhvirtová
2. (Romania) Elena-Gabriela Ruse
3. (United States) McCartney Kessler
4. (Switzerland) Lulu Sun
5. (United States) Sachia Vickery
6. (Czech Republic) Tereza Martincová

=== Qualifying draw ===
==== First qualifier ====
First round
1	(Czech Republic) Brenda Fruhvirtová	6	7
WC	(New Zealand) Elyse Tse	1	5
(Canada) Carol Zhao	1	3
8	(Japan) Himeno Sakatsume	6	6

Qualifying competition
1	(Czech Republic) Brenda Fruhvirtová	6	6
8	(Japan) Himeno Sakatsume	4	2

==== Second qualifier ====
First round
2	(Romania) Elena-Gabriela Ruse	6	6
(Kazakhstan) Anna Danilina	3	3
(Australia) Elysia Bolton	3	4
7	(Germany) Jule Niemeier	6	6

Qualifying competition
2	(Romania) Elena-Gabriela Ruse	6	3	6
7	(Germany) Jule Niemeier	0	6	3

==== Third qualifier ====
First round
3	(France) Jessika Ponchet	2	7^{7}	3
(United States) McCartney Kessler	6	6^{5}	6
WC	(New Zealand) Valentina Ivanov	3	3
11	(Chinese Taipei) Yang Ya-yi	6	6

Qualifying competition
(United States) McCartney Kessler	7	6
11	(Chinese Taipei) Yang Ya-yi	5	4

==== Fourth qualifier ====
First round
4	(Slovakia) Viktória Hrunčáková	6	6
WC	(United States) Bethanie Mattek-Sands	1	3
(Switzerland) Lulu Sun	6	6
10	(Australia) Destanee Aiava	2	2

Qualifying competition
4	(Slovakia) Viktória Hrunčáková	6^{1}	6^{4}
(Switzerland) Lulu Sun	7^{7}	7^{7}

==== Fifth qualifier ====
First round
5	(United States) Sachia Vickery	6	6
(Australia) Alexandra Bozovic	0	3
(France) Harmony Tan	6	0	0^{r}
12	(Netherlands) Suzan Lamens	3	6	3

Qualifying competition
5	(United States) Sachia Vickery	6	6
12	(Netherlands) Suzan Lamens	0	1

==== Sixth qualifier ====
First round
6	(Czech Republic) Tereza Martincová	6	6
(Czech Republic) Anna Sisková	0	0
WC	(New Zealand) Jade Otway	3	3
9	(France) Carole Monnet	6	6

Qualifying competition
6	(Czech Republic) Tereza Martincová	7	6
9	(France) Carole Monnet	5	2
