= 2024 ASB Classic – Men's doubles =

Men's doubles
- 2024 ASB Classic

Final
- Champions: (Netherlands) Wesley Koolhof (Croatia) Nikola Mektić
- Runners-up: (Spain) Marcel Granollers (Argentina) Horacio Zeballos
- Score: 6–3, 6–7^{(5–7)}, [10–7]

Details
- Draw: 16
- Seeds: 4

Events
Singles	men	women
Doubles	men	women
← 2023 ·	ATP Auckland Open	· 2025 →

Defending champion Nikola Mektić and his partner Wesley Koolhof defeated Marcel Granollers and Horacio Zeballos in the final, 6–3, 6–7^{(5–7)}, [10–7] to win the men's doubles tennis title at the 2024 ASB Classic.

Mektić and Mate Pavić were the defending champions, but chose to compete with different partners this year. Pavić partnered Marcelo Arévalo, but lost in the first round to Julian Cash and Robert Galloway.

== Seeds ==
1. (Spain) Marcel Granollers / (Argentina) Horacio Zeballos (final)
2. (Argentina) Máximo González / (Argentina) Andrés Molteni (quarterfinals)
3. (United Kingdom) Jamie Murray / (New Zealand) Michael Venus (first round)
4. (United States) Nathaniel Lammons / (United States) Jackson Withrow (semifinals)

== Draw ==
=== Key ===
- Q = Qualifier
- WC = Wild card
- LL = Lucky loser
- Alt = Alternate
- ITF = ITF entry
- PR = Protected ranking
- SR = Special ranking
- SE = Special exempt
- JE = Junior exempt
- JR = Junior Accelerator Programme entrant
- CO = College Accelerator Programme entrant
- NG = Next Gen Accelerator Program entrant
- w/o = Walkover
- r = Retired
- d = Defaulted

=== Draw ===
First round
1	(Spain) M Granollers (Argentina) H Zeballos	6	2	[10]
WC	(New Zealand) M Daniell (Japan) B McLachlan	3	6	[7]
WC	(New Zealand) A Sitak (New Zealand) R Statham	5	6	[8]
(Monaco) R Arneodo (Austria) S Weissborn	7	3	[10]
4	(United States) N Lammons (United States) J Withrow	6^{4}	7^{7}	[10]
(India) Y Bhambri (Netherlands) R Haase	7^{7}	6^{2}	[7]
(El Salvador) M Arévalo (Croatia) M Pavić	6	6^{5}	[9]
(United Kingdom) J Cash (United States) R Galloway	4	7^{7}	[11]
(France) S Doumbia (France) F Reboul	6	7
Alt	(India) A Chandrasekar (India) VS Prashanth	4	5
(Belgium) S Gillé (Belgium) J Vliegen	7^{10}	4	[10]
3	(United Kingdom) J Murray (New Zealand) M Venus	6^{8}	6	[4]
(Netherlands) W Koolhof (Croatia) N Mektić	6	4	[10]
(Austria) A Erler (Austria) L Miedler	4	6	[7]
Alt	(Brazil) M Demoliner (Netherlands) B Stevens	7^{11}	4	[6]
2	(Argentina) M González (Argentina) A Molteni	6^{9}	6	[10]

Quarterfinals
1	(Spain) M Granollers (Argentina) H Zeballos	6	7^{8}
(Monaco) R Arneodo (Austria) S Weissborn	3	6^{6}
4	(United States) N Lammons (United States) J Withrow	3	7	[10]
(United Kingdom) J Cash (United States) R Galloway	6	5	[2]
(France) S Doumbia (France) F Reboul	6	6
(Belgium) S Gillé (Belgium) J Vliegen	3	4
(Netherlands) W Koolhof (Croatia) N Mektić	6	2	[12]
2	(Argentina) M González (Argentina) A Molteni	0	6	[10]

Semifinals
1	(Spain) M Granollers (Argentina) H Zeballos	6	6
4	(United States) N Lammons (United States) J Withrow	3	4
(France) S Doumbia (France) F Reboul	7	6^{5}	[7]
(Netherlands) W Koolhof (Croatia) N Mektić	5	7^{7}	[10]

Final
1	(Spain) M Granollers (Argentina) H Zeballos	3	7^{7}	[7]
(Netherlands) W Koolhof (Croatia) N Mektić	6	6^{5}	[10]
