= 2025 ASB Classic – Women's singles =

Women's singles
- 2025 ASB Classic

Final
- Champion: (Denmark) Clara Tauson
- Runner-up: (Japan) Naomi Osaka
- Score: 4–6, ret.

Details
- Draw: 32 (6 Q / 3 WC )
- Seeds: 8

Events
Singles	men	women
Doubles	men	women
← 2024 ·	WTA Auckland Open	· 2026 →

Clara Tauson won the women's singles tennis title at the 2025 WTA Auckland Open, 4–6, after Naomi Osaka retired in the final. She saved a match point (in her second round match against Sofia Kenin) en route to her third career WTA Tour title and first since 2021.

Coco Gauff was the two-time reigning champion, but chose to compete at the United Cup instead.

== Seeds ==
1. (United States) Madison Keys (quarterfinals)
2. (Belgium) Elise Mertens (withdrew)
3. (United States) Amanda Anisimova (first round)
4. (New Zealand) Lulu Sun (first round)
5. (Denmark) Clara Tauson (champion)
6. (United Kingdom) Emma Raducanu (withdrew)
7. (Japan) Naomi Osaka (final, retired)
8. (United States) Katie Volynets (quarterfinals)

== Draw ==
=== Key ===
- Q = Qualifier
- WC = Wild card
- LL = Lucky loser
- Alt = Alternate
- SE = Special exempt
- PR = Protected ranking
- ITF = ITF entry
- JE = Junior exempt
- w/o = Walkover
- r = Retired
- d = Defaulted
- SR = Special ranking

=== Finals ===
Semifinals
5	(Denmark) Clara Tauson	6	6
(United States) Robin Montgomery	4	3
(United States) Alycia Parks	4	2
7	(Japan) Naomi Osaka	6	6

Final
5	(Denmark) Clara Tauson	4	0
7	(Japan) Naomi Osaka	6	0^{r}

=== Top half ===
First round
1	(United States) M Keys	6	6
(Italy) L Bronzetti	4	4
(Ukraine) Y Starodubtseva	3	0^{r}
(Romania) J Cristian	6	2
(United States) S Kenin	7^{7}	6
(China) Xiy Wang	6^{5}	1
Q	(Italy) L Stefanini	2	3
5	(Denmark) C Tauson	6	6
4	(New Zealand) L Sun	3	6	3
(Canada) R Marino	6	3	6
(United States) B Pera	6	7
Q	(Andorra) V Jiménez Kasintseva	2	5
(Germany) J Niemeier	3	4
Q	(Japan) N Hibino	6	6
(United States) R Montgomery	6	2	6
LL	(Japan) M Hontama	3	6	0

Second round
1	(United States) M Keys	6	6
(Romania) J Cristian	1	2
(United States) S Kenin	6	6^{7}	6^{3}
5	(Denmark) C Tauson	4	7^{9}	7^{7}
(Canada) R Marino	6^{2}	4
(United States) B Pera	7^{7}	6
Q	(Japan) N Hibino	2	2
(United States) R Montgomery	6	6

Quarterfinals
1	(United States) M Keys	4	6^{7}
5	(Denmark) C Tauson	6	7^{9}
(United States) B Pera	4	4
(United States) R Montgomery	6	6

Semifinals
5	(Denmark) C Tauson	6	6
(United States) R Montgomery	4	3

=== Bottom half ===
First round
8	(United States) K Volynets	6	6^{6}	6
E Andreeva	4	7^{8}	2
(United States) A Li	5	6	6
(United States) S Stephens	7	4	4
(Belgium) G Minnen	6	6
Q	(Germany) A-L Friedsam	4	0
(United States) A Parks	2	6	6
3	(United States) A Anisimova	6	2	3
7	(Japan) N Osaka	6	6
Q	(Israel) L Glushko	4	4
Q	(Spain) L Romero Gormaz	6	3	6^{7}
PR	(Austria) J Grabher	2	6	7^{9}
(United States) H Baptiste	6	6
WC	(Slovakia) R Jamrichová	0	2
WC	(New Zealand) V Yang	3	3
LL	(United Kingdom) J Burrage	6	6

Second round
8	(United States) K Volynets	6	6
(United States) A Li	4	3
(Belgium) G Minnen	5	3
(United States) A Parks	7	6
7	(Japan) N Osaka	7	6
PR	(Austria) J Grabher	5	3
(United States) H Baptiste	5	7	7^{8}
LL	(United Kingdom) J Burrage	7	5	6^{6}

Quarterfinals
8	(United States) K Volynets	1	4
(United States) A Parks	6	6
7	(Japan) N Osaka	6^{2}	6	6
(United States) H Baptiste	7^{7}	1	2

Semifinals
(United States) A Parks	4	2
7	(Japan) N Osaka	6	6

== Qualifying ==
=== Seeds ===
1. (Japan) Ena Shibahara (first round)
2. (Japan) Nao Hibino (qualified)
3. (Italy) Lucrezia Stefanini (qualified)
4. (Andorra) Victoria Jiménez Kasintseva (qualified)
5. (Japan) Mai Hontama (qualifying competition, lucky loser)
6. (Spain) Leyre Romero Gormaz (qualified)
7. (Brazil) Laura Pigossi (first round)
8. (United States) Louisa Chirico (first round)
9. (United Kingdom) Jodie Burrage (qualifying competition, lucky loser)
10. (Italy) Nuria Brancaccio (first round)
11. (France) Séléna Janicijevic (qualifying competition)
12. (United States) Emina Bektas (qualifying competition)

=== Qualifiers ===
1. (Israel) Lina Glushko
2. (Japan) Nao Hibino
3. (Italy) Lucrezia Stefanini
4. (Andorra) Victoria Jiménez Kasintseva
5. (Germany) Anna-Lena Friedsam
6. (Spain) Leyre Romero Gormaz

=== Lucky losers ===
1. (Japan) Mai Hontama
2. (United Kingdom) Jodie Burrage

=== Qualifying draw ===
==== First qualifier ====
First round
1	(Japan) Ena Shibahara	6^{1}	4
WC	(New Zealand) Monique Barry	7^{7}	6
(Israel) Lina Glushko	7^{7}	6
8	(United States) Louisa Chirico	6^{3}	3

Qualifying competition
WC	(New Zealand) Monique Barry	5	6^{4}
(Israel) Lina Glushko	7	7^{7}

==== Second qualifier ====
First round
2	(Japan) Nao Hibino	6	6
WC	(New Zealand) Elyse Tse	4	2
(United States) Sachia Vickery	6	6
7	(Brazil) Laura Pigossi	2	3

Qualifying competition
2	(Japan) Nao Hibino	6	6
(United States) Sachia Vickery	4	2

==== Third qualifier ====
First round
3	(Italy) Lucrezia Stefanini	6	6
(Japan) Haruka Kaji	1	3
(Romania) Miriam Bulgaru	7	3	4
12	(United States) Emina Bektas	5	6	6

Qualifying competition
3	(Italy) Lucrezia Stefanini	6	7
12	(United States) Emina Bektas	3	5

==== Fourth qualifier ====
First round
4	(Andorra) Victoria Jiménez Kasintseva	6	7
WC	(Croatia) Ana Konjuh	4	5
(Georgia (country)) Mariam Bolkvadze	6	6^{4}	3
9	(United Kingdom) Jodie Burrage	2	7^{7}	6

Qualifying competition
4	(Andorra) Victoria Jiménez Kasintseva	6	6
9	(United Kingdom) Jodie Burrage	1	2

==== Fifth qualifier ====
First round
5	(Japan) Mai Hontama	6	6
(Spain) Irene Burillo Escorihuela	1	2
PR	(Germany) Anna-Lena Friedsam	2	6	6
10	(Italy) Nuria Brancaccio	6	2	3

Qualifying competition
5	(Japan) Mai Hontama	6	5	6^{4}
PR	(Germany) Anna-Lena Friedsam	4	7	7^{7}

==== Sixth qualifier ====
First round
6	(Spain) Leyre Romero Gormaz	6^{3}	7^{7}	6
WC	(New Zealand) Valentina Ivanov	7^{7}	6^{3}	3
(Ukraine) Katarina Zavatska	6	1	2
11	(France) Séléna Janicijevic	4	6	6

Qualifying competition
6	(Spain) Leyre Romero Gormaz	6	6
11	(France) Séléna Janicijevic	2	2
