= 2023 ASB Classic – Men's doubles =

Men's doubles
- 2023 ASB Classic

Final
- Champions: (Croatia) Nikola Mektić (Croatia) Mate Pavić
- Runners-up: (United States) Nathaniel Lammons (United States) Jackson Withrow
- Score: 6–4, 6–7^{(5–7)}, [10–6]

Details
- Draw: 16
- Seeds: 4

Events
Singles	men	women
Doubles	men	women
← 2020 ·	ATP Auckland Open	· 2024 →

Nikola Mektić and Mate Pavić defeated Nathaniel Lammons and Jackson Withrow in the final, 6–4, 6–7^{(5–7)}, [10–6] to win the men's doubles tennis title at the 2023 ASB Classic.

Luke Bambridge and Ben McLachlan were the reigning champions from 2020, when the event was last held, but Bambridge had since retired from professional tennis and McLachlan chose to compete in Adelaide instead.

== Seeds ==
1. (Croatia) Nikola Mektić / (Croatia) Mate Pavić (champions)
2. (Spain) Marcel Granollers / (Argentina) Horacio Zeballos (semifinals)
3. (Italy) Simone Bolelli / (Italy) Fabio Fognini (first round)
4. (United Kingdom) Jamie Murray / (New Zealand) Michael Venus (first round)

== Draw ==
=== Key ===
- Q = Qualifier
- WC = Wild card
- LL = Lucky loser
- Alt = Alternate
- SE = Special exempt
- PR = Protected ranking
- ITF = ITF entry
- JE = Junior exempt
- w/o = Walkover
- r = Retired
- d = Defaulted
- SR = Special ranking

=== Draw ===
First round
1	(Croatia) N Mektić (Croatia) M Pavić	7	6^{5}	[10]
WC	(New Zealand) A Rai (New Zealand) F Reynolds	5	7^{7}	[5]
(Argentina) M González (Argentina) A Molteni	w/o
(Argentina) P Cachin (Argentina) F Cerúndolo
3	(Italy) S Bolelli (Italy) F Fognini	4	3
(Austria) A Erler (Austria) L Miedler	6	6
Alt	(Argentina) S Báez (Venezuela) LD Martínez	6	6
(France) S Doumbia (France) F Reboul	4	4
(France) Q Halys (France) A Mannarino	4	1
PR	(France) J Chardy (France) F Martin	6	6
(United States) N Lammons (United States) J Withrow	6^{2}	6	[12]
4	(United Kingdom) J Murray (New Zealand) M Venus	7^{7}	4	[10]
Alt	(Kazakhstan) A Bublik (Australia) J-P Smith
(Belgium) S Gillé (Belgium) J Vliegen	w/o
WC	(United States) A Lawson (New Zealand) A Sitak	6^{4}	2
2	(Spain) M Granollers (Argentina) H Zeballos	7^{7}	6

Quarterfinals
1	(Croatia) N Mektić (Croatia) M Pavić	7^{7}	3	[10]
(Argentina) M González (Argentina) A Molteni	6^{3}	6	[5]
(Austria) A Erler (Austria) L Miedler	6	6
Alt	(Argentina) S Báez (Venezuela) LD Martínez	4	0
PR	(France) J Chardy (France) F Martin	2	6^{4}
(United States) N Lammons (United States) J Withrow	6	7^{7}
(Belgium) S Gillé (Belgium) J Vliegen	4	7^{8}	[7]
2	(Spain) M Granollers (Argentina) H Zeballos	6	6^{6}	[10]

Semifinals
1	(Croatia) N Mektić (Croatia) M Pavić	7^{7}	6
(Austria) A Erler (Austria) L Miedler	6^{5}	3
(United States) N Lammons (United States) J Withrow	7^{7}	7^{7}
2	(Spain) M Granollers (Argentina) H Zeballos	6^{5}	6^{5}

Final
1	(Croatia) N Mektić (Croatia) M Pavić	6	6^{5}	[10]
(United States) N Lammons (United States) J Withrow	4	7^{7}	[6]
