= 2020 ASB Classic – Men's doubles =

Men's doubles
- 2020 ASB Classic

Final
- Champions: (United Kingdom) Luke Bambridge (Japan) Ben McLachlan
- Runners-up: (New Zealand) Marcus Daniell (Austria) Philipp Oswald
- Score: 7–6^{(7–3)}, 6–3

Details
- Draw: 16
- Seeds: 4

Events
Singles	men	women
Doubles	men	women
← 2019 ·	ATP Auckland Open	· 2023 →

Ben McLachlan and Jan-Lennard Struff were the defending champions, but Struff chose not to participate.

McLachlan played alongside Luke Bambridge and successfully defended the title, defeating Marcus Daniell and Philipp Oswald in the final, 7–6^{(7–3)}, 6–3.

== Seeds ==
1. (Australia) John Peers / (New Zealand) Michael Venus (first round)
2. (Croatia) Mate Pavić / (Brazil) Bruno Soares (first round)
3. (India) Rohan Bopanna / (Finland) Henri Kontinen (quarterfinals)
4. (United States) Austin Krajicek / (Croatia) Franko Škugor (semifinals)

== Draw ==
=== Key ===
- Q = Qualifier
- WC = Wild card
- LL = Lucky loser
- Alt = Alternate
- SE = Special exempt
- PR = Protected ranking
- ITF = ITF entry
- JE = Junior exempt
- w/o = Walkover
- r = Retired
- d = Defaulted
- SR = Special ranking

=== Draw ===
First round
1	(Australia) J Peers (New Zealand) M Venus	6^{4}	6^{3}
(India) D Sharan (New Zealand) A Sitak	7^{7}	7^{7}
(Belgium) S Gillé (Belgium) J Vliegen	w/o
(Argentina) L Mayer (Portugal) J Sousa
3	(India) R Bopanna (Finland) H Kontinen	6	6
WC	(United Kingdom) C Norrie (New Zealand) R Purcell	4	2
(United Kingdom) L Bambridge (Japan) B McLachlan	6	7
WC	(United States) M McDonald (New Zealand) A Rai	3	5
(Bolivia) H Dellien (Brazil) T Monteiro	3	4
(United Kingdom) D Inglot (Pakistan) A-u-H Qureshi	6	6
(Mexico) S González (United Kingdom) K Skupski	5	6^{6}
4	(United States) A Krajicek (Croatia) F Škugor	7	7^{8}
(Italy) S Bolelli (Italy) F Fognini	3	1^{r}
(New Zealand) M Daniell (Austria) P Oswald	6	1
(Denmark) F Nielsen (Germany) T Pütz	6^{5}	6	[10]
2	(Croatia) M Pavić (Brazil) B Soares	7^{7}	3	[7]

Quarterfinals
(India) D Sharan (New Zealand) A Sitak	7	6^{3}	[9]
(Belgium) S Gillé (Belgium) J Vliegen	5	7^{7}	[11]
3	(India) R Bopanna (Finland) H Kontinen	3	4
(United Kingdom) L Bambridge (Japan) B McLachlan	6	6
(United Kingdom) D Inglot (Pakistan) A-u-H Qureshi	2	2
4	(United States) A Krajicek (Croatia) F Škugor	6	6
(New Zealand) M Daniell (Austria) P Oswald	4	6	[10]
(Denmark) F Nielsen (Germany) T Pütz	6	1	[7]

Semifinals
(Belgium) S Gillé (Belgium) J Vliegen	6^{5}	6^{4}
(United Kingdom) L Bambridge (Japan) B McLachlan	7^{7}	7^{7}
4	(United States) A Krajicek (Croatia) F Škugor	2	6^{5}
(New Zealand) M Daniell (Austria) P Oswald	6	7^{7}

Final
(United Kingdom) L Bambridge (Japan) B McLachlan	7^{7}	6
(New Zealand) M Daniell (Austria) P Oswald	6^{3}	3
