= 2023 ASB Classic – Men's singles =

Men's singles
- 2023 ASB Classic

Final
- Champion: (France) Richard Gasquet
- Runner-up: (United Kingdom) Cameron Norrie
- Score: 4–6, 6–4, 6–4

Details
- Draw: 28 (4 Q / 3 WC )
- Seeds: 8

Events
Singles	men	women
Doubles	men	women
← 2020 ·	ATP Auckland Open	· 2024 →

Richard Gasquet defeated Cameron Norrie in the final, 4–6, 6–4, 6–4 to win the men's singles tennis title at the 2023 ASB Classic. It was his 16th ATP Tour singles title, and his first since 2018, and his final title overall.

Ugo Humbert was the defending champion from when the event was last held in 2020, but lost in the first round to Christopher Eubanks.

== Seeds ==
The top four seeds received a bye into the second round.

1. (Norway) Casper Ruud (second round)
2. (United Kingdom) Cameron Norrie (final)
3. (Argentina) Diego Schwartzman (second round, retired)
4. (Argentina) Francisco Cerúndolo (withdrew)
5. (Kazakhstan) Alexander Bublik (first round)
6. (United States) John Isner (first round)
7. (Argentina) Sebastián Báez (first round)
8. (France) Adrian Mannarino (first round)

== Draw ==
=== Key ===
- Q = Qualifier
- WC = Wild card
- LL = Lucky loser
- Alt = Alternate
- ITF = ITF entry
- PR = Protected ranking
- SR = Special ranking
- SE = Special exempt
- JE = Junior exempt
- JR = Junior Accelerator Programme entrant
- CO = College Accelerator Programme entrant
- NG = Next Gen Accelerator Program entrant
- w/o = Walkover
- r = Retired
- d = Defaulted

=== Finals ===
Semifinals
(France) Constant Lestienne
(France) Richard Gasquet	w/o
(United States) Jenson Brooksby	3	4
2	(United Kingdom) Cameron Norrie	6	6

Final
(France) Richard Gasquet	4	6	6
2	(United Kingdom) Cameron Norrie	6	4	4

=== Top half ===
First round
(Spain) J Munar	6	1	6^{4}
(Serbia) L Đere	3	6	7^{7}
(France) C Lestienne	6	6
(Argentina) P Cachin	3	1
Q	(France) G Barrère	6^{3}	7^{7}	6
6	(United States) J Isner	7^{7}	6^{5}	3
(France) R Gasquet	6	6
WC	(New Zealand) K Pannu	3	1
WC	(France) U Humbert	6^{4}	6^{3}
Q	(United States) C Eubanks	7^{7}	7^{7}
(Belgium) D Goffin	6	6
5	(Kazakhstan) A Bublik	3	4

Second round
1	(Norway) C Ruud	6	3	6^{3}
(Serbia) L Đere	3	6	7^{7}
(France) C Lestienne	1	7^{7}	7
Q	(France) G Barrère	6	6^{4}	5
LL	(Portugal) J Sousa	6^{2}	2
(France) R Gasquet	7^{7}	6
Q	(United States) C Eubanks	2	4
(Belgium) D Goffin	6	6

Quarterfinals
(Serbia) L Đere	6	6^{2}	5
(France) C Lestienne	2	7^{7}	7
(France) R Gasquet	1	6	6
(Belgium) D Goffin	6	1	1

Semifinals
(France) C Lestienne
(France) R Gasquet	w/o

=== Bottom half ===
First round
7	(Argentina) S Báez	6^{1}	1
WC	(United States) B Shelton	7^{7}	6
(Slovakia) A Molčan	3	4
(France) Q Halys	6	6
(United States) J Brooksby	6^{2}	6	6
(Italy) F Fognini	7^{7}	1	3
8	(France) A Mannarino	4	6^{4}
(United States) JJ Wolf	6	7^{7}
(United States) M Giron	6^{5}	6	7
LL	(Argentina) F Coria	7^{7}	4	5
Q	(Czech Republic) J Lehečka	6	7
Q	(Brazil) T Monteiro	3	5

Second round
WC	(United States) B Shelton	3	2
(France) Q Halys	6	6
(United States) J Brooksby	6	0
3	(Argentina) D Schwartzman	1	0^{r}
(United States) JJ Wolf	4	4
(United States) M Giron	6	6
Q	(Czech Republic) J Lehečka	4	7^{7}	3
2	(United Kingdom) C Norrie	6	6^{4}	6

Quarterfinals
(France) Q Halys	6^{3}	6^{2}
(United States) J Brooksby	7^{7}	7^{7}
(United States) M Giron	1	7^{7}	2
2	(United Kingdom) C Norrie	6	6^{5}	6

Semifinals
(United States) J Brooksby	3	4
2	(United Kingdom) C Norrie	6	6

== Qualifying ==
=== Seeds ===
1. (Brazil) Thiago Monteiro (qualified)
2. (Argentina) Federico Coria (qualifying competition, lucky loser)
3. (Serbia) Dušan Lajović (first round)
4. (Czech Republic) Jiří Lehečka (qualified)
5. (Portugal) João Sousa (qualifying competition, lucky loser)
6. (Argentina) Facundo Bagnis (qualifying competition)
7. (France) Grégoire Barrère (qualified)
8. (Japan) Taro Daniel (first round)

=== Qualifiers ===
1. (Brazil) Thiago Monteiro
2. (France) Grégoire Barrère
3. (United States) Christopher Eubanks
4. (Czech Republic) Jiří Lehečka

=== Lucky losers ===
1. (Argentina) Federico Coria
2. (Portugal) João Sousa

=== Qualifying draw ===
==== First qualifier ====
First round
1	(Brazil) Thiago Monteiro	3	7	7^{8}
(Germany) Daniel Altmaier	6	5	6^{6}
WC	(New Zealand) Ajeet Rai	7	0	6
8	(Japan) Taro Daniel	5	6	3

Qualifying competition
1	(Brazil) Thiago Monteiro	6^{5}	6	6
WC	(New Zealand) Ajeet Rai	7^{7}	3	4

==== Second qualifier ====
First round
2	(Argentina) Federico Coria	3	6	6
(France) Luca Van Assche	6	4	2
(Bulgaria) Alexandar Lazarov	1	4
7	(France) Grégoire Barrère	6	6

Qualifying competition
2	(Argentina) Federico Coria	3	5
7	(France) Grégoire Barrère	6	7

==== Third qualifier ====
First round
3	(Serbia) Dušan Lajović	6	3	4
(United States) Christopher Eubanks	2	6	6
WC	(New Zealand) Finn Reynolds	6^{1}	4
5	(Portugal) João Sousa	7^{7}	6

Qualifying competition
(United States) Christopher Eubanks	6^{3}	7	6
5	(Portugal) João Sousa	7^{7}	5	4

==== Fourth qualifier ====
First round
4	(Czech Republic) Jiří Lehečka	5	6	6
(United Kingdom) Jan Choinski	7	0	2
(Chinese Taipei) Tseng Chun-hsin	3	3
6	(Argentina) Facundo Bagnis	6	6

Qualifying competition
4	(Czech Republic) Jiří Lehečka	6	3	6
6	(Argentina) Facundo Bagnis	2	6	1
