= 2023 ASB Classic – Women's singles =

Women's singles
- 2023 ASB Classic

Final
- Champion: (United States) Coco Gauff
- Runner-up: (Spain) Rebeka Masarova
- Score: 6–1, 6–1

Details
- Draw: 32 (4 Q / 3 WC )
- Seeds: 8

Events
Singles	men	women
Doubles	men	women
← 2020 ·	WTA Auckland Open	· 2024 →

Coco Gauff won the title, defeating Rebeka Masarova in the final, 6–1, 6–1. It was her third career title, not losing a set throughout the tournament.

Serena Williams was the reigning champion from when the event was last held in 2020, but retired from professional tennis in 2022.

== Seeds ==
1. (United States) Coco Gauff (champion)
2. (United States) Sloane Stephens (first round)
3. (Canada) Leylah Fernandez (quarterfinals)
4. (United States) Bernarda Pera (first round)
5. (China) Wang Xiyu (first round, retired)
6. (United States) Madison Brengle (first round)
7. (Montenegro) Danka Kovinić (semifinals)
8. (Canada) Rebecca Marino (second round)

== Draw ==
=== Key ===
- Q = Qualifier
- WC = Wild card
- LL = Lucky loser
- Alt = Alternate
- ITF = ITF entry
- PR = Protected ranking
- SR = Special ranking
- SE = Special exempt
- JE = Junior exempt
- JR = Junior Accelerator Programme entrant
- CO = College Accelerator Programme entrant
- NG = Next Gen Accelerator Program entrant
- w/o = Walkover
- r = Retired
- d = Defaulted

=== Finals ===
Semifinals
1	(United States) Coco Gauff	6	6
7	(Montenegro) Danka Kovinić	0	2
Q	(Belgium) Ysaline Bonaventure	3	3
Q	(Spain) Rebeka Masarova	6	6

Final
1	(United States) Coco Gauff	6	6
Q	(Spain) Rebeka Masarova	1	1

=== Top half ===
First round
1	(United States) C Gauff	6	6
(Germany) T Maria	4	1
(China) Xin Wang	6^{6}	3
WC	(United States) S Kenin	7^{8}	6
Q	(United States) K Volynets	6^{4}	2
WC	(United States) V Williams	7^{7}	6
(China) L Zhu	4	7^{8}	6
6	(United States) M Brengle	6	6^{6}	4
4	(United States) B Pera	4	4
Q	(Slovakia) V Kužmová	6	6
(United Kingdom) E Raducanu	4	6	6
(Czech Republic) L Fruhvirtová	6	4	2
(Slovenia) T Zidanšek	2	1
(United States) L Davis	6	6
Q	(Japan) N Hibino	1	4
7	(Montenegro) D Kovinić	6	6

Second round
1	(United States) C Gauff	6	6
WC	(United States) S Kenin	4	4
WC	(United States) V Williams	6	2	5
(China) L Zhu	3	6	7
Q	(Slovakia) V Kužmová	0	7	0
(United Kingdom) E Raducanu	6	5	0^{r}
(United States) L Davis	6	3	2
7	(Montenegro) D Kovinić	4	6	6

Quarterfinals
1	(United States) C Gauff	6	6
(China) L Zhu	3	2
Q	(Slovakia) V Kužmová	3	2
7	(Montenegro) D Kovinić	6	6

Semifinals
1	(United States) C Gauff	6	6
7	(Montenegro) D Kovinić	0	2

=== Bottom half ===
First round
8	(Canada) R Marino	6	7^{7}
(Hungary) D Gálfi	3	6^{3}
Q	(Belgium) Y Bonaventure	5	6	6
(United States) C McNally	7	4	4
(Austria) J Grabher	5	6	6
(Czech Republic) T Martincová	7	1	2
WC	(Czech Republic) B Fruhvirtová	1	1
3	(Canada) L Fernandez	6	6
5	(China) Xiy Wang	3^{r}
PR	(Czech Republic) K Muchová	5
WC	(New Zealand) E Routliffe	2	6	4
Q	(Romania) E-G Ruse	6	4	6
(Italy) E Cocciaretto	4	6	5
A Blinkova	6	4	7
Q	(Spain) R Masarova	6	7^{7}
2	(United States) S Stephens	3	6^{5}

Second round
8	(Canada) R Marino	6	3	3
Q	(Belgium) Y Bonaventure	3	6	6
(Austria) J Grabher	0	1
3	(Canada) L Fernandez	6	6
PR	(Czech Republic) K Muchová	6	6
Q	(Romania) E-G Ruse	4	1
A Blinkova	1	4
Q	(Spain) R Masarova	6	6

Quarterfinals
Q	(Belgium) Y Bonaventure	6	6
3	(Canada) L Fernandez	4	2
PR	(Czech Republic) K Muchová	6^{4}	6^{2}
Q	(Spain) R Masarova	7^{7}	7^{7}

Semifinals
Q	(Belgium) Y Bonaventure	3	3
Q	(Spain) R Masarova	6	6

== Qualifying ==
=== Seeds ===
1. (Belgium) Ysaline Bonaventure (qualified)
2. Varvara Gracheva (qualifying competition)
3. (Japan) Moyuka Uchijima (qualifying competition)
4. (Italy) Sara Errani (qualifying competition)
5. Diana Shnaider (first round)
6. (United States) Katie Volynets (qualified)
7. (Netherlands) Arantxa Rus (qualifying competition)
8. (Romania) Elena-Gabriela Ruse (qualified)
9. (United States) Elizabeth Mandlik (first round)
10. (United States) CoCo Vandeweghe (first round)
11. (United States) Ann Li (first round)
12. (Spain) Rebeka Masarova (qualified)

=== Qualifiers ===
1. (Belgium) Ysaline Bonaventure
2. (Slovakia) Viktória Kužmová
3. (Romania) Elena-Gabriela Ruse
4. (Spain) Rebeka Masarova
5. (Japan) Nao Hibino
6. (United States) Katie Volynets

=== Qualifying draw ===
==== First qualifier ====
First round
1	(Belgium) Ysaline Bonaventure	6	6
(France) Elsa Jacquemot	3	4
(Italy) Lucrezia Stefanini	2	0
7	(Netherlands) Arantxa Rus	6	6

Qualifying competition
1	(Belgium) Ysaline Bonaventure	6	2	6
7	(Netherlands) Arantxa Rus	3	6	4

==== Second qualifier ====
First round
2	Varvara Gracheva	7	5	6
(United States) Caroline Dolehide	5	7	2
(Slovakia) Viktória Kužmová	6	6
9	(United States) Elizabeth Mandlik	4	4

Qualifying competition
2	Varvara Gracheva	3	6	3
(Slovakia) Viktória Kužmová	6	4	6

==== Third qualifier ====
First round
3	(Japan) Moyuka Uchijima	6	6
WC	(France) Chloé Paquet	3	4
(Spain) Aliona Bolsova	5	4
8	(Romania) Elena-Gabriela Ruse	7	6

Qualifying competition
3	(Japan) Moyuka Uchijima	4	1
8	(Romania) Elena-Gabriela Ruse	6	6

==== Fourth qualifier ====
First round
4	(Italy) Sara Errani	6	6
WC	(New Zealand) Vivian Yang	1	4
WC	(Canada) Katherine Sebov	6^{4}	6^{5}
12	(Spain) Rebeka Masarova	7^{7}	7^{7}

Qualifying competition
4	(Italy) Sara Errani	2	3
12	(Spain) Rebeka Masarova	6	6

==== Fifth qualifier ====
First round
5	Diana Shnaider	4	6	3
(Romania) Jaqueline Cristian	6	3	6
(Japan) Nao Hibino	2	7^{11}	6
10	(United States) CoCo Vandeweghe	6	6^{9}	2

Qualifying competition
(Romania) Jaqueline Cristian	3	6	2
(Japan) Nao Hibino	6	4	6

==== Sixth qualifier ====
First round
6	(United States) Katie Volynets	1	6	6
(United States) Katrina Scott	6	3	3
WC	(Canada) Eugenie Bouchard	6	6
11	(United States) Ann Li	4	3

Qualifying competition
6	(United States) Katie Volynets	w/o
WC	(Canada) Eugenie Bouchard
