= 2020 ASB Classic – Men's singles =

Men's singles
- 2020 ASB Classic

Final
- Champion: (France) Ugo Humbert
- Runner-up: (France) Benoît Paire
- Score: 7–6^{(7–2)}, 3–6, 7–6^{(7–5)}

Details
- Draw: 28 (4 Q / 3 WC )
- Seeds: 8

Events
Singles	men	women
Doubles	men	women
← 2019 ·	ATP Auckland Open	· 2023 →

Tennys Sandgren was the defending champion, but lost to John Isner in the second round.

Ugo Humbert won his first title on the ATP Tour, defeating Benoît Paire in the final, 7–6^{(7–2)}, 3–6, 7–6^{(7–5)}.

== Seeds ==
1. (Italy) Fabio Fognini (second round)
2. (Canada) Denis Shapovalov (quarterfinals)
3. (Russia) Karen Khachanov (second round)
4. (United States) John Isner (semifinals)
5. (France) Benoît Paire (final)
6. (Poland) Hubert Hurkacz (semifinals)
7. (France) Adrian Mannarino (first round)
8. (Moldova) Radu Albot (withdrew)

== Draw ==
=== Finals ===
Semifinals
6	(Poland) Hubert Hurkacz	4	7^{7}	2
5	(France) Benoît Paire	6	6^{1}	6
4	(United States) John Isner	6^{5}	4
(France) Ugo Humbert	7^{7}	6

Final
5	(France) Benoît Paire	6^{2}	6	6^{5}
(France) Ugo Humbert	7^{7}	3	7^{7}

=== Top half ===
First round
(Spain) F López	3	7^{7}	6
(Spain) P Andújar	6	6^{4}	4
Q	(Sweden) M Ymer	6	5	6
(United States) F Tiafoe	4	7	1
(Italy) L Sonego	5	3
6	(Poland) H Hurkacz	7	6
Q	(United States) M Mmoh	6^{5}	4
(Australia) J Millman	7^{7}	6
(United Kingdom) C Norrie	6^{3}	2
Q	(Brazil) T Monteiro	7^{7}	6
WC	(Italy) J Sinner	4	6	4
5	(France) B Paire	6	2	6

Second round
1	(Italy) F Fognini	6	4	3
(Spain) F López	3	6	6
Q	(Sweden) M Ymer	2	6^{2}
6	(Poland) H Hurkacz	6	7^{7}
3	(Russia) K Khachanov	6	3	3
(Australia) J Millman	4	6	6
Q	(Brazil) T Monteiro	6	4	3
5	(France) B Paire	4	6	6

Quarterfinals
(Spain) F López	4	7^{13}	4
6	(Poland) H Hurkacz	6	6^{11}	6
(Australia) J Millman	6	1	4
5	(France) B Paire	3	6	6

Semifinals
6	(Poland) H Hurkacz	4	7^{7}	2
5	(France) B Paire	6	6^{1}	6

=== Bottom half ===
First round
7	(France) A Mannarino	6	4	4
(Italy) A Seppi	3	6	6
WC	(Spain) A Davidovich Fokina	2	6	3
(United Kingdom) K Edmund	6	4	6
(United States) T Sandgren	6	6
WC	(New Zealand) M Venus	4	3
LL	(Argentina) L Mayer	6^{6}	7^{20}	6^{2}
(Italy) M Cecchinato	7^{8}	6^{18}	7^{7}
(France) U Humbert	7^{7}	2	6
(Norway) C Ruud	6^{3}	6	3
(Portugal) J Sousa	4	2
Q	(Canada) V Pospisil	6	6

Second round
(Italy) A Seppi	3	6^{4}
(United Kingdom) K Edmund	6	7^{7}
(United States) T Sandgren	6^{3}	7^{7}	3
4	(United States) J Isner	7^{7}	6^{1}	6
(Italy) M Cecchinato	1	4
(France) U Humbert	6	6
Q	(Canada) V Pospisil	4	6^{2}
2	(Canada) D Shapovalov	6	7^{7}

Quarterfinals
(United Kingdom) K Edmund	6^{5}	6^{5}
4	(United States) J Isner	7^{7}	7^{7}
(France) U Humbert	7	6
2	(Canada) D Shapovalov	5	4

Semifinals
4	(United States) J Isner	6^{5}	4
(France) U Humbert	7^{7}	6

== Qualifying ==
=== Seeds ===
1. (Bolivia) Hugo Dellien (first round)
2. (Italy) Marco Cecchinato (moved to main draw)
3. (Sweden) Mikael Ymer (qualified)
4. (Brazil) Thiago Monteiro (qualified)
5. (Argentina) Leonardo Mayer (qualifying competition, lucky loser)
6. (United States) Mackenzie McDonald (qualifying competition)
7. (Japan) Tatsuma Ito (qualifying competition)
8. (Canada) Vasek Pospisil (qualified)

=== Qualifiers ===
1. (United States) Michael Mmoh
2. (Canada) Vasek Pospisil
3. (Sweden) Mikael Ymer
4. (Brazil) Thiago Monteiro

=== Lucky loser ===
1. (Argentina) Leonardo Mayer

=== Qualifying draw ===
==== First qualifier ====
First round
1	(Bolivia) Hugo Dellien	0	1
Alt	(United States) Michael Mmoh	6	6
(Japan) Shuichi Sekiguchi	3	6	4
7	(Japan) Tatsuma Ito	6	4	6

Qualifying competition
Alt	(United States) Michael Mmoh	6	6
7	(Japan) Tatsuma Ito	2	2

==== Second qualifier ====
First round				Qualifying competition
				WC	(Denmark) Holger Rune	5	1
				8	(Canada) Vasek Pospisil	7	6
Alt	(New Zealand) Kiranpal Pannu	2	4	8	(Canada) Vasek Pospisil	7	6
8	(Canada) Vasek Pospisil	6	6

==== Third qualifier ====
First round				Qualifying competition
3	(Sweden) Mikael Ymer	7	7^{7}
Alt	(Canada) Frank Dancevic	5	6^{4}
Alt	(Canada) Frank Dancevic	5	6^{4}	3	(Sweden) Mikael Ymer	6	6
				6	(United States) Mackenzie McDonald	4	3

==== Fourth qualifier ====
First round
4	(Brazil) Thiago Monteiro	6	6
WC	(New Zealand) Ajeet Rai	4	2
(New Zealand) Rhett Purcell	5	6	1
5	(Argentina) Leonardo Mayer	7	4	6

Qualifying competition
4	(Brazil) Thiago Monteiro	7^{7}	4	6
5	(Argentina) Leonardo Mayer	6^{3}	6	1
