= 2020 ASB Classic – Women's singles =

Women's singles
- 2020 ASB Classic

Final
- Champion: (United States) Serena Williams
- Runner-up: (United States) Jessica Pegula
- Score: 6–3, 6–4

Details
- Draw: 32 (4 Q / 3 WC )
- Seeds: 8

Events
Singles	men	women
Doubles	men	women
- WTA Auckland Open

Serena Williams defeated Jessica Pegula in the final, 6–3, 6–4 to win the women's singles tennis title at the 2020 ASB Classic. It was Williams’ 73rd and last WTA Tour-level singles title, her first title since 2017, and her first since giving birth to her daughter Olympia. The win made her the first player in the Open Era to win singles titles across four decades.

Julia Görges was the two-time defending champion, but lost in the quarterfinals to Caroline Wozniacki.

== Seeds ==
1. (United States) Serena Williams (champion)
2. (Croatia) Petra Martić (second round)
3. (United States) Amanda Anisimova (semifinals)
4. (Germany) Julia Görges (quarterfinals)
5. (Denmark) Caroline Wozniacki (semifinals)
6. (Sweden) Rebecca Peterson (first round)
7. (Latvia) Jeļena Ostapenko (withdrew)
8. (France) Caroline Garcia (second round)
9. (Belgium) Alison Van Uytvanck (withdrew)

== Draw ==
Key

- Q = Qualifier
- WC = Wild card
- LL = Lucky loser
- Alt = Alternate
- ITF = ITF entry
- PR = Protected ranking
- SR = Special ranking
- SE = Special exempt
- JE = Junior exempt
- JR = Junior Accelerator Programme entrant
- CO = College Accelerator Programme entrant
- NG = Next Gen Accelerator Program entrant
- w/o = Walkover
- r = Retired
- d = Defaulted

=== Finals ===
Semifinals
1	(United States) Serena Williams	6	6
3	(United States) Amanda Anisimova	1	1
5	(Denmark) Caroline Wozniacki	6	4	0
(United States) Jessica Pegula	3	6	6

Final
1	(United States) Serena Williams	6	6
(United States) Jessica Pegula	3	4

=== Top half ===
First round
1	(United States) S Williams	6	6
Q	(Italy) C Giorgi	3	2
(United States) C McHale	7	6
Q	(United States) A Li	5	2
(United States) C Gauff	6	6
(Slovakia) V Kužmová	3	1
(Germany) L Siegemund	6	6
LL	(United States) C McNally	2	2
3	(United States) A Anisimova	6	6
(Ukraine) K Kozlova	3	4
(Spain) C Suárez Navarro	3	6	2
(Russia) D Kasatkina	6	3	6
WC	(Canada) E Bouchard	7	7
(Belgium) K Flipkens	5	5
(United States) T Townsend	7	3	5
8	(France) C Garcia	5	6	7

Second round
1	(United States) S Williams	3	6	6
(United States) C McHale	6	2	3
(United States) C Gauff	7	2	3
(Germany) L Siegemund	5	6	6
3	(United States) A Anisimova	6	6
(Russia) D Kasatkina	2	4
WC	(Canada) E Bouchard	6	6
8	(France) C Garcia	4	4

Quarterfinals
1	(United States) S Williams	6	6
(Germany) L Siegemund	4	3
3	(United States) A Anisimova	6	3	6
WC	(Canada) E Bouchard	2	6	4

Semifinals
1	(United States) S Williams	6	6
3	(United States) A Anisimova	1	1

=== Bottom half ===
First round
5	(Denmark) C Wozniacki	6	6
WC	(New Zealand) P Hourigan	1	0
(United States) L Davis	7^{9}	6
Q	(United States) V Lepchenko	6^{7}	2
(Switzerland) J Teichmann	6	6
WC	(New Zealand) V Ivanov	4	3
Q	(Belgium) G Minnen	1	6^{4}
4	(Germany) J Görges	6	7^{7}
6	(Sweden) R Peterson	6^{7}	6^{5}
(Slovenia) T Zidanšek	7^{9}	7^{7}
PR	(United States) C Bellis	0	4
(United States) J Pegula	6	6
(France) A Cornet	4	7	6
LL	(Belgium) Y Bonaventure	6	5	3
LL	(United States) UM Arconada	7	4	4
2	(Croatia) P Martić	5	6	6

Second round
5	(Denmark) C Wozniacki	6	4	6
(United States) L Davis	1	6	4
(Switzerland) J Teichmann	3	2
4	(Germany) J Görges	6	6
(Slovenia) T Zidanšek	2	3
(United States) J Pegula	6	6
(France) A Cornet	3	6	6
2	(Croatia) P Martić	6	4	4

Quarterfinals
5	(Denmark) C Wozniacki	6	6
4	(Germany) J Görges	1	4
(United States) J Pegula	6	3
(France) A Cornet	0	2^{r}

Semifinals
5	(Denmark) C Wozniacki	6	4	0
(United States) J Pegula	3	6	6

== Qualifying ==
=== Seeds ===
1. (United States) Kristie Ahn (first round)
2. (Spain) Paula Badosa (second round)
3. (Romania) Ana Bogdan (first round)
4. (Italy) Camila Giorgi (qualified)
5. (Japan) Nao Hibino (second round)
6. (Belgium) Greet Minnen (qualified)
7. (Spain) Aliona Bolsova (second round)
8. (Belgium) Ysaline Bonaventure (qualifying competition, lucky loser)

=== Qualifiers ===
1. (United States) Varvara Lepchenko
2. (United States) Ann Li
3. (Belgium) Greet Minnen
4. (Italy) Camila Giorgi

=== Lucky losers ===
1. (Belgium) Ysaline Bonaventure
2. (United States) Usue Maitane Arconada
3. (United States) Caty McNally

=== Qualifying draw ===
==== First qualifier ====
First round
1	(United States) Kristie Ahn	7^{7}	3	3
(United States) Caty McNally	6^{0}	6	6
(Netherlands) Bibiane Schoofs	7	7^{10}
(Japan) Mayo Hibi	5	6^{8}
(United States) Varvara Lepchenko	6	6
(United States) Allie Kiick	1	0
(Italy) Elisabetta Cocciaretto	6	2	3
7	(Spain) Aliona Bolsova	3	6	6

Second round
(United States) Caty McNally	6	6
(Netherlands) Bibiane Schoofs	4	1
(United States) Varvara Lepchenko	6	6^{3}	6
7	(Spain) Aliona Bolsova	3	7^{7}	4

Qualifying competition
(United States) Caty McNally	7	4	4
(United States) Varvara Lepchenko	5	6	6

==== Second qualifier ====
First round
2	(Spain) Paula Badosa	7	7^{7}
WC	(Canada) Leylah Annie Fernandez	5	6^{3}
(Netherlands) Lesley Pattinama Kerkhove	2	6^{7}
(United States) Usue Maitane Arconada	6	7^{9}
(United States) Ann Li	6	6
(Paraguay) Verónica Cepede Royg	3	3
(Belgium) Yanina Wickmayer	6^{3}	6	1
5	(Japan) Nao Hibino	7^{7}	2	6

Second round
2	(Spain) Paula Badosa	1	3
(United States) Usue Maitane Arconada	6	6
(United States) Ann Li	6	6
5	(Japan) Nao Hibino	3	4

Qualifying competition
(United States) Usue Maitane Arconada	1	5
(United States) Ann Li	6	7

==== Third qualifier ====
First round
3	(Romania) Ana Bogdan	4	6	4
(Italy) Giulia Gatto-Monticone	6	4	6
(Russia) Valeria Savinykh	2	6^{4}
(Bulgaria) Isabella Shinikova	6	7^{7}
(United States) Robin Anderson	0	6	4
WC	(Australia) Arina Rodionova	6	3	6
(Spain) Lara Arruabarrena	3	4
6	(Belgium) Greet Minnen	6	6

Second round
(Italy) Giulia Gatto-Monticone	6	4	4
(Bulgaria) Isabella Shinikova	2	6	6
WC	(Australia) Arina Rodionova	6	4	6^{5}
6	(Belgium) Greet Minnen	2	6	7^{7}

Qualifying competition
(Bulgaria) Isabella Shinikova	0	1
6	(Belgium) Greet Minnen	6	6

==== Fourth qualifier ====
First round
4	(Italy) Camila Giorgi	4	6	6
(Japan) Kurumi Nara	6	2	0
PR	(United States) CoCo Vandeweghe	1	6^{6}
(United States) Caroline Dolehide	6	7^{8}
WC	(New Zealand) Erin Routliffe	2	5
WC	(Italy) Sara Errani	6	7
(Romania) Irina Bara	3	1
8	(Belgium) Ysaline Bonaventure	6	6

Second round
4	(Italy) Camila Giorgi	7	6
(United States) Caroline Dolehide	5	3
WC	(Italy) Sara Errani	7^{7}	5	4
8	(Belgium) Ysaline Bonaventure	6^{5}	7	6

Qualifying competition
4	(Italy) Camila Giorgi	6^{4}	6	6
8	(Belgium) Ysaline Bonaventure	7^{7}	4	1
