= 2020 ASB Classic =

Coordinates: 36.853742°S 174.773507°E

- Date: 6–12 January 2020 (women); 13–18 January 2020 (men)
- Edition: 35th (women); 44th (men)
- Category: WTA International; ATP 250
- Draw: 32S / 16D (women); 28S / 16D (men)
- Prize money: $275,000 (women) $610,010 (men)
- Surface: Hard
- Location: Auckland, New Zealand
- Venue: ASB Tennis Centre

Champions

Men's singles
- (France) Ugo Humbert

Women's singles
- (United States) Serena Williams

Men's doubles
- (Japan) Ben McLachlan / (United Kingdom) Luke Bambridge

Women's doubles
- (United States) Asia Muhammad / (United States) Taylor Townsend
- Auckland Open

The 2020 Auckland Open (sponsored by ASB Bank) was a joint ATP and WTA tennis tournament, played on outdoor hard courts. It was the 35th edition of the women's event, and the 44th edition of the men's event. It took place at the ASB Tennis Centre in Auckland, New Zealand, from 6 to 12 January 2020 for the women, and from 13 to 18 January 2020 for the men.

== Points and prize money ==
=== Point distribution ===
| Event | W | F | SF | QF | Round of 16 | Round of 32 | Q | Q3 | Q2 | Q1 |
| Men's singles | 250 | 150 | 90 | 45 | 20 | 0 | 12 | 6 | 0 | —N/a |
| Men's doubles | 250 | 150 | 90 | 45 | 0 | —N/a | —N/a | —N/a | —N/a | —N/a |
| Women's singles | 280 | 180 | 110 | 60 | 30 | 1 | 18 | 14 | 10 | 1 |
| Women's doubles | 280 | 180 | 110 | 60 | 1 | —N/a | —N/a | —N/a | —N/a | —N/a |

=== Prize money ===
| Event | W | F | SF | QF | Round of 16 | Round of 32^{1} | Q3 | Q2 | Q1 |
| Men's singles | $91,625 | $50,710 | $28,540 | $16,250 | $9,320 | $5,450 | $2,665 | $1,385 | —N/a |
| Men's doubles * | $30,900 | $15,840 | $8,580 | $4,910 | $2,880 | —N/a | —N/a | —N/a | —N/a |
| Women's singles | $43,000 | $21,410 | $11,400 | $6,100 | $3,570 | $2,300 | $1,080 | $940 | $800 |
| Women's doubles * | $13,580 | $7,200 | $4,000 | $2,300 | $1,520 | —N/a | —N/a | —N/a | —N/a |

_{^{1} Qualifiers' prize money is also the Round of 32 prize money}
_{* per team}

== ATP singles main-draw entrants ==
=== Seeds ===
| Country | Player | Rank^{1} | Seed |
|---|---|---|---|
| ITA | Fabio Fognini | 12 | 1 |
| CAN | Denis Shapovalov | 14 | 2 |
| RUS | Karen Khachanov | 17 | 3 |
| USA | John Isner | 19 | 4 |
| FRA | Benoît Paire | 24 | 5 |
| POL | Hubert Hurkacz | 37 | 6 |
| FRA | Adrian Mannarino | 43 | 7 |
| ~~MDA~~ | ~~Radu Albot~~ | ~~46~~ | ~~8~~ |

- ^{1} Rankings as of 6 January 2020.

=== Other entrants ===
The following players received wildcards into the singles main draw:

- (Spain) Alejandro Davidovich Fokina
- (Italy) Jannik Sinner
- (New Zealand) Michael Venus

The following players received entry from the qualifying draw:

- (United States) Michael Mmoh
- (Brazil) Thiago Monteiro
- (Canada) Vasek Pospisil
- (Sweden) Mikael Ymer

The following player received entry as a lucky loser:

- (Argentina) Leonardo Mayer

=== Withdrawals ===
- (Moldova) Radu Albot → replaced by (Argentina) Leonardo Mayer
- (Russia) Daniil Medvedev → replaced by (United States) Tennys Sandgren

== ATP doubles main-draw entrants ==
=== Seeds ===
| Country | Player | Country | Player | Rank^{1} | Seed |
|---|---|---|---|---|---|
| AUS | John Peers | NZL | Michael Venus | 35 | 1 |
| CRO | Mate Pavić | BRA | Bruno Soares | 38 | 2 |
| IND | Rohan Bopanna | FIN | Henri Kontinen | 58 | 3 |
| USA | Austin Krajicek | CRO | Franko Škugor | 76 | 4 |

- ^{1} Rankings as of 6 January 2020.

=== Other entrants ===
The following pairs received wildcards into the doubles main draw:

- (United States) Mackenzie McDonald / (New Zealand) Ajeet Rai
- (United Kingdom) Cameron Norrie / (New Zealand) Rhett Purcell

== WTA singles main-draw entrants ==
=== Seeds ===
| Country | Player | Rank^{1} | Seed |
|---|---|---|---|
| USA | Serena Williams | 10 | 1 |
| CRO | Petra Martić | 15 | 2 |
| USA | Amanda Anisimova | 24 | 3 |
| GER | Julia Görges | 28 | 4 |
| DEN | Caroline Wozniacki | 38 | 5 |
| SWE | Rebecca Peterson | 44 | 6 |
| ~~LAT~~ | ~~Jeļena Ostapenko~~ | ~~45~~ | ~~7~~ |
| FRA | Caroline Garcia | 46 | 8 |
| ~~BEL~~ | ~~Alison Van Uytvanck~~ | ~~47~~ | ~~9~~ |

- ^{1} Rankings as of December 30, 2019

=== Other entrants ===
The following players received wildcards into the singles main draw:

- (Canada) Eugenie Bouchard
- (New Zealand) Paige Hourigan
- (New Zealand) Valentina Ivanov

The following player received entry using a protected ranking into the singles main draw:

- (United States) Catherine Bellis

The following players received entry from the qualifying draw:

- (Italy) Camila Giorgi
- (United States) Varvara Lepchenko
- (United States) Ann Li
- (Belgium) Greet Minnen

The following players received entry as lucky losers:

- (United States) Usue Maitane Arconada
- (Belgium) Ysaline Bonaventure
- (United States) Caty McNally

=== Withdrawals ===
- (Canada) Bianca Andreescu → replaced by (United States) Christina McHale
- (Russia) Svetlana Kuznetsova → replaced by (United States) Usue Maitane Arconada
- (Latvia) Jeļena Ostapenko → replaced by (Belgium) Ysaline Bonaventure
- (Puerto Rico) Monica Puig → replaced by (United States) Jessica Pegula
- (Belgium) Alison Van Uytvanck → replaced by (United States) Caty McNally

=== Retirements ===
- (France) Alizé Cornet (right adductor strain)

== WTA doubles main-draw entrants ==
=== Seeds ===
| Country | Player | Country | Player | Rank^{1} | Seed |
|---|---|---|---|---|---|
| USA | Caroline Dolehide | SWE | Johanna Larsson | 95 | 1 |
| ESP | Lara Arruabarrena | CZE | Renata Voráčová | 105 | 2 |
| USA | Desirae Krawczyk | GER | Laura Siegemund | 121 | 3 |
| USA | Kaitlyn Christian | CHI | Alexa Guarachi | 126 | 4 |

- ^{1} Rankings as of December 30, 2019

=== Other entrants ===
The following pairs received wildcards into the doubles main draw:

- (Italy) Sara Errani / (New Zealand) Paige Hourigan
- (United States) Allie Kiick / (New Zealand) Erin Routliffe

=== Retirements ===
- (Germany) Laura Siegemund (right thigh injury)

== Finals ==
=== Men's singles ===
- (France) Ugo Humbert defeated (France) Benoît Paire, 7–6^{(7–2)}, 3–6, 7–6^{(7–5)}

=== Women's singles ===
- (United States) Serena Williams defeated (United States) Jessica Pegula, 6–3, 6–4

=== Men's doubles ===
- (United Kingdom) Luke Bambridge / (Japan) Ben McLachlan defeated (New Zealand) Marcus Daniell / (Austria) Philipp Oswald, 7–6^{(7–2)}, 6–3

=== Women's doubles ===
- (United States) Asia Muhammad / (United States) Taylor Townsend defeated (United States) Serena Williams / (Denmark) Caroline Wozniacki, 6–4, 6–4
