= 2024 ASB Classic =

- Date: 1–7 January 2024 (women); 8–13 January 2024 (men)
- Edition: 37th (women); 46th (men)
- Category: WTA 250; ATP 250
- Draw: 32S / 16D (women); 28S / 16D (men)
- Surface: Hard
- Location: Auckland, New Zealand
- Venue: ASB Tennis Centre

Champions

Men's singles
- (Chile) Alejandro Tabilo

Women's singles
- (United States) Coco Gauff

Men's doubles
- (Netherlands) Wesley Koolhof / (Croatia) Nikola Mektić

Women's doubles
- (Kazakhstan) Anna Danilina / (Slovakia) Viktória Hrunčáková
- Auckland Open

The 2024 Auckland Open (sponsored by ASB Bank) was a joint professional men's and women's tennis tournament played on outdoor hard courts at the ASB Tennis Centre in Auckland. The 37th edition of the women's event (a WTA 250 tournament) was held from 1 to 7 January 2024 and the 46th edition of the men's event (an ATP 250 tournament) was held from 8 to 13 January 2024.

== Finals ==
=== Men's singles ===
- (Chile) Alejandro Tabilo defeated (Japan) Taro Daniel, 6–2, 7–5

=== Women's singles ===
- (United States) Coco Gauff defeated (Ukraine) Elina Svitolina, 6–7^{(4–7)}, 6–3, 6–3

=== Men's doubles ===
- (Netherlands) Wesley Koolhof / (Croatia) Nikola Mektić defeated (Spain) Marcel Granollers / (Argentina) Horacio Zeballos, 6–3, 6–7^{(5–7)}, [10–7]

=== Women's doubles ===
- (Kazakhstan) Anna Danilina / (Slovakia) Viktória Hrunčáková defeated (Czech Republic) Marie Bouzková / (United States) Bethanie Mattek-Sands, 6–3, 6–7^{(5–7)}, [10–8]

== ATP singles main draw entrants ==
=== Seeds ===
Country	Player	Rank^{1}	Seed
USA	Ben Shelton	17	1
GBR	Cameron Norrie	18	2
ARG	Francisco Cerúndolo	21	3
CAN	Félix Auger-Aliassime	29	4
USA	Christopher Eubanks	34	5
FRA	Arthur Fils	36	6
AUT	Sebastian Ofner	43	7
AUS	Max Purcell	45	8

- ^{1} Rankings as of 1 January 2024.

=== Other entrants ===
The following players received wildcards into the singles main draw:

- (France) Richard Gasquet
- (New Zealand) Kiranpal Pannu
- (Canada) Denis Shapovalov

The following players received entry from the qualifying draw:

- (United States) Alex Michelsen
- (France) Alexandre Müller
- (Chile) Alejandro Tabilo
- (France) Luca Van Assche

=== Withdrawals ===
- (France) Adrian Mannarino → replaced by (France) Benjamin Bonzi
- (Germany) Jan-Lennard Struff → replaced by (France) Gaël Monfils

== ATP doubles main draw entrants ==
=== Seeds ===
Country	Player	Country	Player	Rank^{1}	Seed
ESP	Marcel Granollers	ARG	Horacio Zeballos	15	1
ARG	Máximo González	ARG	Andrés Molteni	26	2
GBR	Jamie Murray	NZL	Michael Venus	32	3
USA	Nathaniel Lammons	USA	Jackson Withrow	49	4

- ^{1} Rankings as of 1 January 2024.

=== Other entrants ===
The following pairs received wildcards into the doubles main draw:

- (New Zealand) Marcus Daniell / (Japan) Ben McLachlan
- (New Zealand) Artem Sitak / (New Zealand) Rubin Statham

The following pairs received entry as alternates:

- (India) Anirudh Chandrasekar / (India) Vijay Sundar Prashanth
- (Brazil) Marcelo Demoliner / (Netherlands) Bart Stevens

=== Withdrawals ===
- (United States) Christopher Eubanks / (United States) Ben Shelton → replaced by (Brazil) Marcelo Demoliner / (Netherlands) Bart Stevens
- (Hungary) Fábián Marozsán / (Austria) Sebastian Ofner → replaced by (India) Anirudh Chandrasekar / (India) Vijay Sundar Prashanth

== WTA singles main draw entrants ==
=== Seeds ===
Country	Player	Rank^{1}	Seed
USA	Coco Gauff	3	1
UKR	Elina Svitolina	25	2
UKR	Lesia Tsurenko	31	3
USA	Emma Navarro	32	4
CZE	Marie Bouzková	34	5
CHN	Wang Xinyu	36	6
CRO	Petra Martić	40	7
FRA	Varvara Gracheva	43	8

- ^{1} Rankings as of 25 December 2023.

=== Other entrants ===
The following players received wildcards into the singles main draw:

- (United States) Amanda Anisimova
- (New Zealand) Monique Barry
- (United Kingdom) Emma Raducanu
- (Denmark) Caroline Wozniacki

The following players received entry from the qualifying draw:

- (Czech Republic) Brenda Fruhvirtová
- (United States) McCartney Kessler
- (Czech Republic) Tereza Martincová
- (Romania) Elena-Gabriela Ruse
- (Switzerland) Lulu Sun
- (United States) Sachia Vickery

== WTA doubles main draw entrants ==
=== Seeds ===
Country	Player	Country	Player	Rank^{1}	Seed
CZE	Marie Bouzková	USA	Bethanie Mattek-Sands	74	1
KAZ	Anna Danilina	SVK	Viktória Hrunčáková	137	2
NED	Bibiane Schoofs	BEL	Kimberley Zimmermann	144	3
FRA	Jessika Ponchet	CZE	Anna Sisková	260	4

- ^{1} Rankings as of 25 December 2023.

=== Other entrants ===
The following pair received a wildcard into the doubles main draw:

- (New Zealand) Monique Barry / (New Zealand) Elyse Tse
