= 2024 ASB Classic – Women's doubles =

Women's doubles
- 2024 ASB Classic

Final
- Champions: (Kazakhstan) Anna Danilina (Slovakia) Viktória Hrunčáková
- Runners-up: (Czech Republic) Marie Bouzková (United States) Bethanie Mattek-Sands
- Score: 6–3, 6–7^{(5–7)}, [10–8]

Details
- Draw: 15
- Seeds: 4

Events
Singles	men	women
Doubles	men	women
- WTA Auckland Open

Anna Danilina and Viktória Hrunčáková defeated Marie Bouzková and Bethanie Mattek-Sands in the final, 6–3, 6–7^{(5–7)}, [10–8] to win the women's doubles tennis title at the 2024 WTA Auckland Open.

Miyu Kato and Aldila Sutjiadi were the reigning champions, but chose to compete in Brisbane instead.

== Seeds ==
The top seed received a bye into the quarterfinals.

1. (Czech Republic) Marie Bouzková / (United States) Bethanie Mattek-Sands (final)
2. (Kazakhstan) Anna Danilina / (Slovakia) Viktória Hrunčáková (champions)
3. (Netherlands) Bibiane Schoofs / (Belgium) Kimberley Zimmermann (quarterfinals)
4. (France) Jessika Ponchet / (Czech Republic) Anna Sisková (semifinals)

== Draw ==
Key

- Q = Qualifier
- WC = Wild card
- LL = Lucky loser
- Alt = Alternate
- ITF = ITF entry
- PR = Protected ranking
- SR = Special ranking
- SE = Special exempt
- JE = Junior exempt
- JR = Junior Accelerator Programme entrant
- CO = College Accelerator Programme entrant
- NG = Next Gen Accelerator Program entrant
- w/o = Walkover
- r = Retired
- d = Defaulted

=== Draw ===
First round
(Czech Republic) B Fruhvirtová (Czech Republic) L Fruhvirtová	3	6^{5}
(New Zealand) P Hourigan (New Zealand) E Routliffe	6	7^{7}
3	(Netherlands) B Schoofs (Belgium) K Zimmermann	6	7^{7}
(United Kingdom) S Murray Sharan (United States) S Santamaria	1	6^{3}
(United States) M Kessler (Netherlands) S Lamens	6	6
(France) C Monnet (Australia) A Osborne	3	2
WC	(New Zealand) M Barry (New Zealand) E Tse	3	2
(New Zealand) J Otway (Switzerland) L Sun	6	6
(Australia) D Aiava (Australia) O Tjandramulia	4	6^{2}
4	(France) J Ponchet (Czech Republic) A Sisková	6	7^{7}
(China) Xiy Wang (China) Y Yuan	6	6
A Blinkova (France) V Gracheva	3	1
(Australia) E Bolton (Australia) A Bozovic	3	1
2	(Kazakhstan) A Danilina (Slovakia) V Hrunčáková	6	6

Quarterfinals
1	(Czech Republic) M Bouzková (United States) B Mattek-Sands	6	6
(New Zealand) P Hourigan (New Zealand) E Routliffe	4	2
3	(Netherlands) B Schoofs (Belgium) K Zimmermann	3	5
(United States) M Kessler (Netherlands) S Lamens	6	7
(New Zealand) J Otway (Switzerland) L Sun	5	3
4	(France) J Ponchet (Czech Republic) A Sisková	7	6
(China) Xiy Wang (China) Y Yuan	4	6^{6}
2	(Kazakhstan) A Danilina (Slovakia) V Hrunčáková	6	7^{8}

Semifinals
1	(Czech Republic) M Bouzková (United States) B Mattek-Sands	6	7^{7}
(United States) M Kessler (Netherlands) S Lamens	3	6^{5}
4	(France) J Ponchet (Czech Republic) A Sisková	6^{2}	6	[7]
2	(Kazakhstan) A Danilina (Slovakia) V Hrunčáková	7^{7}	4	[10]

Final
1	(Czech Republic) M Bouzková (United States) B Mattek-Sands	3	7^{7}	[8]
2	(Kazakhstan) A Danilina (Slovakia) V Hrunčáková	6	6^{5}	[10]
