= 2020 ASB Classic – Women's doubles =

Women's doubles
- 2020 ASB Classic

Final
- Champions: (United States) Asia Muhammad (United States) Taylor Townsend
- Runners-up: (United States) Serena Williams (Denmark) Caroline Wozniacki
- Score: 6–4, 6–4

Details
- Draw: 16
- Seeds: 4

Events
Singles	men	women
Doubles	men	women
- WTA Auckland Open

Eugenie Bouchard and Sofia Kenin were the defending champions, but chose not to participate this year.

Asia Muhammad and Taylor Townsend won the title, defeating Serena Williams and Caroline Wozniacki in the final, 6–4, 6–4. This was the first time that Serena Williams participated in a WTA Tour doubles tournament without partnering her sister Venus Williams since the 2002 Leipzig Open.

== Seeds ==
1. (United States) Caroline Dolehide / (Sweden) Johanna Larsson (quarterfinals)
2. (Spain) Lara Arruabarrena / (Czech Republic) Renata Voráčová (first round)
3. (United States) Desirae Krawczyk / (Germany) Laura Siegemund (quarterfinals, retired)
4. (United States) Kaitlyn Christian / (Chile) Alexa Guarachi (first round)

== Draw ==
Key

- Q = Qualifier
- WC = Wild card
- LL = Lucky loser
- Alt = Alternate
- ITF = ITF entry
- PR = Protected ranking
- SR = Special ranking
- SE = Special exempt
- JE = Junior exempt
- JR = Junior Accelerator Programme entrant
- CO = College Accelerator Programme entrant
- NG = Next Gen Accelerator Program entrant
- w/o = Walkover
- r = Retired
- d = Defaulted

=== Draw ===
First round
1	(United States) C Dolehide (Sweden) J Larsson	6	3	[10]
(United States) H Carter (Brazil) L Stefani	4	6	[6]
(United States) S Williams (Denmark) C Wozniacki	6	6
(Japan) N Hibino (Japan) M Ninomiya	2	4
3	(United States) D Krawczyk (Germany) L Siegemund	6	6
(Romania) I Bara (Russia) V Savinykh	0	4
(Australia) M Adamczak (Slovenia) K Srebotnik	6^{5}	6	[6]
(Belgium) K Flipkens (Belgium) A Van Uytvanck	7^{7}	4	[10]
(France) C Garcia (Germany) J Görges	4	6	[10]
WC	(United States) A Kiick (New Zealand) E Routliffe	6	1	[8]
(United States) A Muhammad (United States) T Townsend	6	7^{7}
4	(United States) K Christian (Chile) A Guarachi	2	6^{4}
WC	(Italy) S Errani (New Zealand) P Hourigan	1	3
(Australia) J Moore (Australia) Ar Rodionova	6	6
(United States) C Gauff (United States) C McNally	6	7^{7}
2	(Spain) L Arruabarrena (Czech Republic) R Voráčová	1	6^{3}

Quarterfinals
1	(United States) C Dolehide (Sweden) J Larsson	2	1
(United States) S Williams (Denmark) C Wozniacki	6	6
3	(United States) D Krawczyk (Germany) L Siegemund	3	0^{r}
(Belgium) K Flipkens (Belgium) A Van Uytvanck	6	1
(France) C Garcia (Germany) J Görges	4	1
(United States) A Muhammad (United States) T Townsend	6	6
(Australia) J Moore (Australia) Ar Rodionova	3	2
(United States) C Gauff (United States) C McNally	6	6

Semifinals
(United States) S Williams (Denmark) C Wozniacki	7^{11}	6
(Belgium) K Flipkens (Belgium) A Van Uytvanck	6^{9}	2
(United States) A Muhammad (United States) T Townsend	6	7
(United States) C Gauff (United States) C McNally	1	5

Final
(United States) S Williams (Denmark) C Wozniacki	4	4
(United States) A Muhammad (United States) T Townsend	6	6
