= 2019 WTA Elite Trophy =

Tennis tournament in Zhuhai, China

- Date: 22–27 October
- Edition: 5th
- Draw: 12S/6D
- Surface: Hard / Outdoor / Covered Court
- Location: Zhuhai, China
- Venue: Hengqin Tennis Center, Zhuhai

Champions

Singles
- (Belarus) Aryna Sabalenka

Doubles
- (Ukraine) Lyudmyla Kichenok / (Slovenia) Andreja Klepač
← 2018 ·	WTA Elite Trophy	· 2023 →

The 2019 WTA Elite Trophy was a women's tennis tournament played at the Hengqin International Tennis Center in Zhuhai, China. It was the fifth edition of the singles event and doubles competition. The tournament was contested by 12 singles players and six doubles teams.

== Tournament ==
=== Qualifying ===
WTA Elite Trophy is an invitation-only event.

==== Singles qualifying ====
The field consisted of the top 11 players not already qualified for the 2019 WTA Finals, plus either (a) the 12th-player not qualified for 2019 WTA Finals, or (b) a wild card. The final two alternates for the 2019 WTA Finals were eligible to play in WTA Elite Trophy even if they had participated in the WTA Finals. Point totals were calculated by combining points obtained from 16 tournaments. Of these 16 tournaments, a player's results from the four Grand Slam events, the four Premier Mandatory tournaments, and (for Top 20 players at the end of 2018) the best results from two Premier 5 tournaments had to be included.

==== Doubles qualifying ====
Two teams composed of players that did not compete in the WTA Finals singles (except Finals Alternates) or doubles competitions, using the players’ combined doubles rankings as of the Monday after the final regular-season Tournament of the current Tour Year to determine the order of acceptance; and up to two teams composed of players that did not qualify to compete in the WTA Finals singles (except Finals Alternates) or doubles competitions and that include at least one Elite Trophy Singles Qualified Player or Elite Trophy Alternate, using the higher of the players’ combined singles or doubles rankings as of the Monday after the final regular-season Tournament of the current Tour Year to determine the order of acceptance. Plus two wild cards. For each wild card not given out, the next highest pair of players would become a participant.

=== Format ===
The singles event featured 12 players in a round robin event, split into four groups of three. Over the first four days of competition, each player met the other two players in her group, with the winner in each group advancing to the semifinal. The winners of each semifinal met in the championship match. The six doubles teams were split into two round robin groups, with the winner of each advancing to the final.

==== Round robin tie-breaking methods ====
The final standings of each group were determined by the first of the following methods that apply:

1. Greatest number of wins.
2. Greatest number of matches played.
3. In case of a 2-way tie:
  - Head-to-head results
4. In case of a 3-way tie:
  - Percentage of sets won
    - Head-to-head results
  - Percentage of games won
    - Head-to-head results
  - Finals Rankings

=== Global Ambassador ===
Steffi Graf.

== Prize money and points ==
The total prize money for the 2019 WTA Elite Trophy Zhuhai was US$2,419,844 .

Stage	Singles		Doubles^{2}
Stage	Prize money	Points	Prize money
Champion	RR^{1} + $515,000	RR + 460	RR^{1} + $22,000
Runner-up	RR + $155,000	RR + 200	RR^{1} + $11,346
Semifinalist loss	RR + $15,000	RR	—
Round robin win per match	1st win +$50,000; 2nd win +$40,000	120	+$5,500
Round robin loss per match	—	40	—
Round robin first place	+$69,500	—	—
Round robin second place	+$32,000	—	—
Participation Fee	$46,500	—	17,080
Alternates	$10,000	—	—

- ^{1} RR means prize money or points won in the round robin.
- ^{2} Doubles doesn't award ranking points

== Qualified players ==
=== Singles ===
Seeds	Players	Points	Tours
1	(Netherlands) Kiki Bertens	3,870	25
2	(United States) Sofia Kenin	2,615	23
3	(United States) Madison Keys	2,607	14
4	(Belarus) Aryna Sabalenka	2,520	23
5	(Croatia) Petra Martić	2,458	17
6	(Belgium) Elise Mertens	2,190	25
7	(United States) Alison Riske	2,185	23
8	(Croatia) Donna Vekić	2,185	22
9	(Greece) Maria Sakkari	1,741	22
10	(Ukraine) Dayana Yastremska	1,720	23
11	(Czech Republic) Karolína Muchová	1,624	14
12/WC	(China) Zheng Saisai	1,355	26

Kiki Bertens had another stellar season following on from the success she enjoyed in 2018. She won two more titles during the season in St. Petersburg and Madrid, the latter being the biggest of her career so far. She also reached two finals in Rosmalen and Palermo. She also had five semifinal appearances during the season in Sydney, Stuttgart, Rome, Eastbourne and Beijing. She also reached three quarterfinals in Doha, Linz and Moscow. However, her grand slam results were disappointing as she lost in the second round in Australian Open and French Open and third round in Wimbledon and US Open. She narrowly missed qualifying for WTA Finals in Shenzhen. Bertens would be making her second appearance in Zhuhai having lost in the round robin stage in 2016.

Sofia Kenin had a breakthrough season in 2019, winning her first career title in Hobart in January. She won two more titles during the season in Mallorca and Guangzhou. She also reached a final in Acapulco and back to back semifinals in premier 5 level tournaments in Toronto and Cincinnati. She also reached a quarterfinal in Zhengzhou, finishing the season inside the top 15. Her grand slam breakthrough came at the French Open where she defeated Serena Williams en route to reaching the fourth round. She also made the third round of US Open and second round of Australian Open and Wimbledon. Kenin was making her debut appearance in Zhuhai.

Madison Keys had an extremely up-and-down season, marked by numerous early exits but also title wins in Cincinnati, her biggest career title and Charleston, her first clay court title. She also reached a quarterfinal at French Open and in Osaka, finishing the season inside the top 20 for the fourth straight year. At the other majors, she made the fourth round of Australian Open and US Open and second round of Wimbledon. Keys was making her third appearance in Zhuhai, having bowed out in the round robin stage in 2015 and 2018.

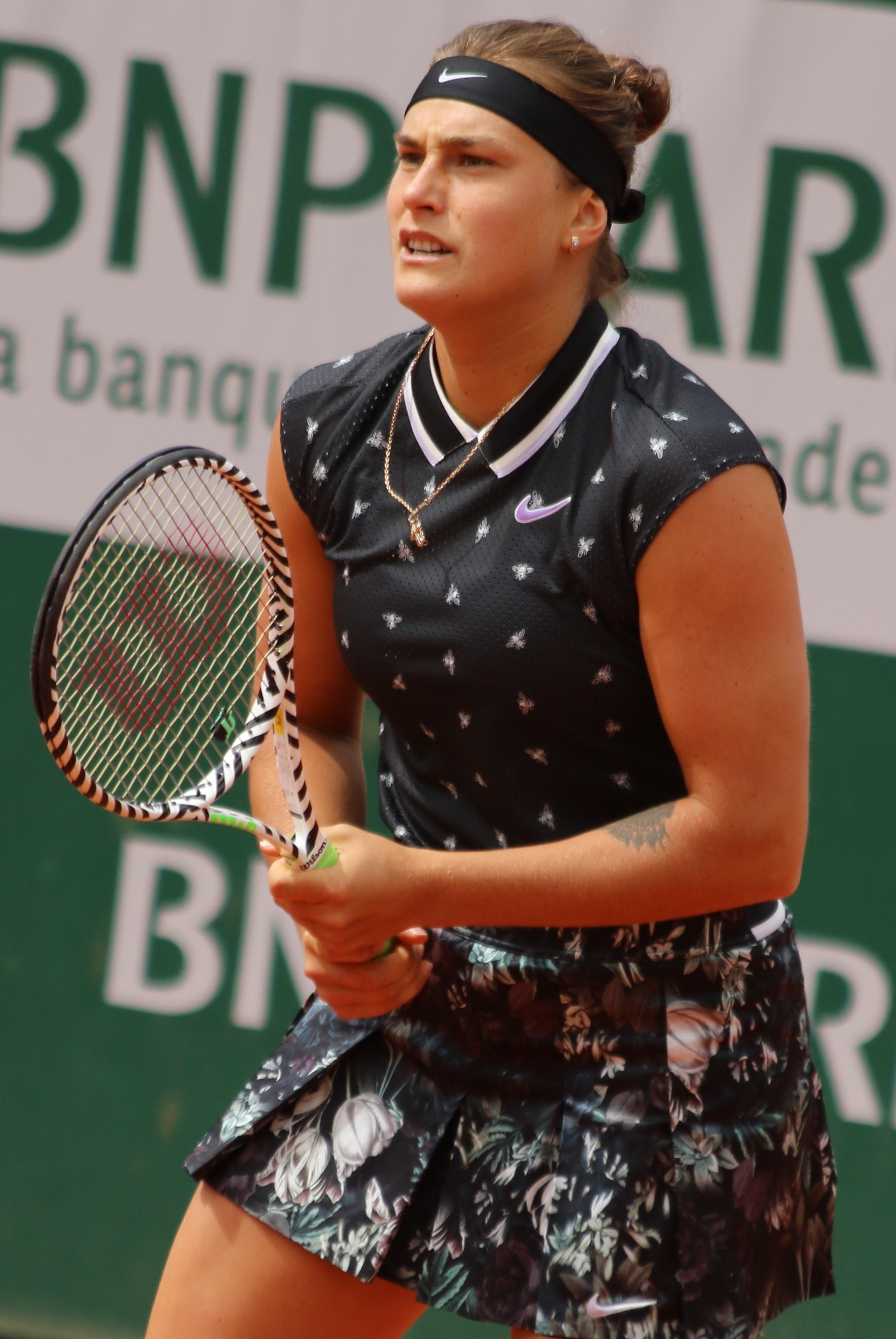
Aryna Sabalenka

Aryna Sabalenka had a mixed season in 2019, with extreme highs and lows. She successfully defended her title in premier 5 level event in Wuhan in addition to winning a title in Shenzhen during the first week of the season. She also reached a final in San Jose and semifinals in St. Petersburg and Strasbourg. She also reached quarterfinals in Eastbourne and Zhengzhou, finishing the season inside the top 20 for the second straight year. Her performance at grand slam events was disappointing with a third round loss at the Australian Open, second round defeats in French Open and US Open and also a first round loss at Wimbledon. Sabalenka was making her second appearance in Zhuhai, having narrowly missed a chance to reach the semifinals last year.

Petra Martić enjoyed her career best season, picking up her first singles title in Istanbul. She also made a final in Zhengzhou and semifinals in Charleston and Birmingham. She also reached quarterfinals in Madrid, Wuhan and the French Open which was her first ever grand slam quarterfinal. Her performance at other grand slam events was also encouraging with a fourth round loss at Wimbledon and US Open to go with a third round appearance in Australian Open. Martić was making her debut in Zhuhai, having cracked the top 15 for the first time.

Elise Mertens carried on from she left off last season, picking up her first premier level singles title in Doha. She also made a semifinal in Osaka and quarterfinals in Sydney, Rabat, Mallorca and most importantly at the US Open. At the other grand slam events, she reached the fourth round at Wimbledon and third round at Australian Open and French Open. Mertens was making her second straight appearance in Zhuhai, having fallen in the round robin stage last year.

Alison Riske had the best season of her career, picking up her second career singles title in s-Hertogenbosch in addition to winning an ITF 100K event in Surbiton. She also reached the final in Shenzhen and Wuhan, losing to Sabalenka on both occasions. She also made her first ever grand slam quarterfinal at Wimbledon. Other grand slam performances included second round appearance at US Open and first round defeats at Australian Open and French Open. Riske was competing in Zhuhai for the first time.

Donna Vekić also enjoyed her career best season, highlighted by her first grand slam singles quarterfinal US Open. She made two finals during the season in St. Petersburg and Nottingham. She also reached the semifinals in Brisbane, Acapulco and San Jose and quarterfinal in Stuttgart. Other grand slam performances included fourth round appearance at French Open, second round exit at Australian Open and first round defeat at Wimbledon. Vekić was making her debut appearance in Zhuhai.

Maria Sakkari also had a successful season, picking up her first career title in Rabat. She made semifinals in Rome as a qualifier and San Jose. She also reached quarterfinals in Charleston, Nottingham and Cincinnati, finishing the season inside the top 30 for the first time. At grand slam events, she consistently made third round at the Australian Open, Wimbledon and US Open and second round at French Open. Sakkari was also making her debut appearance in Zhuhai.

Dayana Yastremska was the youngest participant in Zhuhai in 2019 after another good showing during the season. She picked up two titles in Hua Hin and Strasbourg, taking her tally of singles titles up to three. She also made quarterfinals in Hobart, Wuhan and Tianjin. Her performance at grand slam events wasn't too shabby either as she made the fourth round at Wimbledon, third round at the Australian Open and US Open but lost in the first round at French Open. As mentioned before, Yastremska was making her debut appearance in Zhuhai.

Karolína Muchová qualified for Zhuhai just two days before the start of the tournament after putting together some good performances during the season, the most noteworthy of which was her first grand slam quarterfinal at Wimbledon. She also made the third round at the US Open, second round at French Open and qualified to get into the main draw of Australian Open, losing in the opening round. She won her first career title in Seoul, having already reached her first career final at her home event in Prague. She also made a semifinal in Moscow and quarterfinals in Doha and New York City. Muchová was also making her debut appearance in Zhuhai.

Zheng Saisai was 2019's wildcard recipient in Zhuhai after a strong showing during the season. She won her first career singles title in San Jose as well as a challenger in Anning. She also made quarterfinals in Hua Hin, Acapulco and Zhengzhou. Her performance at grand slam events was extremely disappointing though as she failed to win a match in all four of them. Zheng was making her second appearance in Zhuhai, having also received a wildcard in 2015 when she failed to advance past the round robin stage.

== Points breakdown ==
=== Singles ===
Updated as of 21 October 2019.

- Players in gold qualified.
- Player in dark gold received a wildcard.
- Players in brown withdrew from consideration of competing in this event.

Rank	Athlete	Grand Slam tournament				Premier Mandatory				Best Premier 5		Best other						Total points	Tours	Titles
Rank	Athlete	AUS	FRA	WIM	USO	INW	MIA	MAD	BEI	1	2	1	2	3	4	5	6	Total points	Tours	Titles
9	(United States) Serena Williams	QF; 430	R32; 130	F 1300	F 1300	R32; 65	R32; 65	A 0	A 0	F 585	R32; 60							3,935	8	0
10	(Netherlands) Kiki Bertens	R64; 70	R64; 70	R32; 130	R32; 130	R16; 120	R16; 120	W 1000	SF; 390	SF; 350	R16; 105	W 470	SF; 185	SF; 185	SF; 185	F 180	F 180	3,870	25	2
11	(United Kingdom) Johanna Konta	R64; 70	SF; 780	QF; 430	QF; 430	R32; 65	R64; 35	R32; 65	A 0	F 585	R64; 1	F 180	QF; 60	R16; 55	R16; 55	R16; 55	Q2; 13	2,879	16	0
12	(United States) Sofia Kenin	R64; 70	R16; 240	R64; 70	R32; 130	R64; 35	R64; 10	R64; 10	R16; 120	SF; 350	SF; 350	W 280	W 280	W 280	F 180	R16; 105	R16; 105	2,615	23	3
13	(United States) Madison Keys	R16; 240	QF; 430	R64; 70	R16; 240	R64; 10	R64; 10	R64; 10	R32; 65	W 900	R32; 60	W 470	QF; 100	R64; 1	R32; 1			2,607	14	2
14	(Belarus) Aryna Sabalenka	R32; 130	R64; 70	R128; 10	R64; 70	R16; 120	R64; 10	R64; 10	R32; 10	W 900	R16; 105	F 305	W 280	SF; 185	SF; 110	R16; 105	QF; 100	2,520	23	2
15	(Croatia) Petra Martić	R32; 130	QF; 430	R16; 240	R16; 240	R128; 10	R64; 35	QF; 215	R64; 10	QF; 190	R64; 1	F 305	W 280	SF; 185	SF; 185	R64; 1	R64; 1	2,458	17	1
16	(Czech Republic) Markéta Vondroušová	R64; 70	F 1300	R128; 10	A 0	QF; 215	QF; 215	A 0	A 0	QF; 190		F 180	F 180	R32; 30				2,390	9	0
17	(Germany) Angelique Kerber	R16; 240	R128; 10	R64; 70	R128; 10	F 650	R32; 65	R32; 65	R32; 65	R16; 105	R64; 1	F 305	SF; 185	SF; 185	SF; 110	SF; 110	QF; 100	2,276	20	0
18	(Belgium) Elise Mertens	R32; 130	R32; 130	R16; 240	QF; 430	R32; 65	R32; 65	R64; 10	R32; 65	R32; 60	R32; 60	W 470	SF; 185	QF; 100	R32; 60	QF; 60	QF; 60	2,190	25	1
19	(United States) Alison Riske	R128; 10	R128; 10	QF; 430	R64; 70	R128; 10	R64; 35	R64; 10	R16; 120	F 585	R16; 105	W 280	F 180	W 140	R32; 90	R16; 55	R16; 55	2,185	23	1
20	(Croatia) Donna Vekić	R64; 70	R16; 240	R128; 10	QF; 430	R64; 10	R32; 65	R16; 120	R64; 10	R16; 105	R32; 60	F 305	SF; 185	SF; 185	F 180	SF; 110	QF; 100	2,185	22	0
21	(United States) Amanda Anisimova	R16; 240	SF; 780	R64; 70	A 0	R64; 35	R64; 35	Q1; 2	R64; 10	R32; 60	R32; 60	W 280	QF; 100	QF; 60	QF; 60	R64; 1	R32; 1	1,794	15	1
22	(Greece) Maria Sakkari	R32; 130	R64; 70	R32; 130	R32; 130	R128; 10	R64; 35	R64; 10	A 0	SF; 380	QF; 190	W 280	SF; 185	QF; 100	QF; 60	R32; 30	R64; 1	1,741	22	1
23	(United States) Sloane Stephens	R16; 240	QF; 430	R32; 130	R128; 10	R64; 10	R32; 65	SF; 390	R32; 65	R16; 105	R16; 105	QF; 100	R16; 55	R16; 30	R16; 1	R32; 1	R32; 1	1,738	19	0
24	(Ukraine) Dayana Yastremska	R32; 130	R128; 10	R16; 240	R32; 130	R128; 10	R64; 35	R64; 10	R32; 65	QF; 190	R16; 105	W 280	W 280	QF; 60	R32; 60	QF; 60	R16; 55	1,720	23	2
25	(Estonia) Anett Kontaveit	R64; 70	R128; 10	R32; 130	R32; 130	R16; 120	SF; 390	R64; 10	A 0	R16; 105	R16; 105	F 305	QF; 100	R32; 60	R16; 55	R16; 55	R32; 30	1,675	17	0
26	(Czech Republic) Karolína Muchová	R128; 40	R64; 70	QF; 430	R32; 130	A 0	R64; 65	A 0	R64; 10	Q3; 18^{‡}	R32; 1^{‡}	W 280	SF; 185	F 180	QF; 125	QF; 60	R16; 30	1,624	14	1
Alternates
27	(Latvia) Anastasija Sevastova	R16; 240	R16; 240	R64; 70	R32; 130	R32; 65	R32; 65	R16; 120	R64; 10	R64; 1	R64; 1	W 280	SF; 110	QF; 100	QF; 100	R16; 55	R16; 30	1,617	24	1
28	(Germany) Julia Görges	R128; 10	R128; 10	R32; 130	R16; 240	R32; 65	R32; 65	R64; 10	R64; 10	R32; 60	R32; 60	F 305	W 280	F 180	QF; 100	R16; 55	R16; 30	1,610	21	1
29	(China) Wang Qiang	R32; 130	R64; 70	R32; 130	QF; 430	R16; 120	QF; 215	R64; 10	R64; 10	R16; 105	R64; 1	SF; 110	QF; 60	SF; 57	R16; 55	R16; 30	R16; 30	1,563	20	0
30	(Russia) Anastasia Pavlyuchenkova	QF; 430	R128; 10	R128; 10	R64; 70	R64; 10	R64; 10	R64; 10	R32; 65	R32; 60	R16; 30^{‡}	F 305	F 305	QF; 100	QF; 60	R16; 55	R16; 30	1,560	22	0
Wildcard
40	(China) Zheng Saisai	R128; 10	R128; 10	R128; 10	R128; 10	R128; 10	R128; 10	R16; 120	R16; 120	R32; 60	R32; 60	W 470	W 160	QF; 100	F 85	QF; 60	QF; 60	1,355	26	1

‡ The player was not a Top 20 player at the end of 2018 and therefore not required to count her two best Premier 5 results. Accordingly, the player's next best result was counted in its place.

=== Doubles ===
Country	Player	Country	Player	Rank^{1}
CHN	Duan Yingying	CHN	Yang Zhaoxuan	58
UKR	Lyudmyla Kichenok	SLO	Andreja Klepač	66
CRO	Darija Jurak	POL	Alicja Rosolska	67
GEO	Oksana Kalashnikova	USA	Sofia Kenin	99

- ^{1} Rankings as of 21 October 2019

==== Other entrants ====
The following pairs received wildcards into the doubles draw:

- (China) Jiang Xinyu / (China) Tang Qianhui
- (China) Wang Xinyu / (China) Zhu Lin

== Champions ==
=== Singles ===
- (Belarus) Aryna Sabalenka def. (Netherlands) Kiki Bertens, 6–4, 6–2

=== Doubles ===
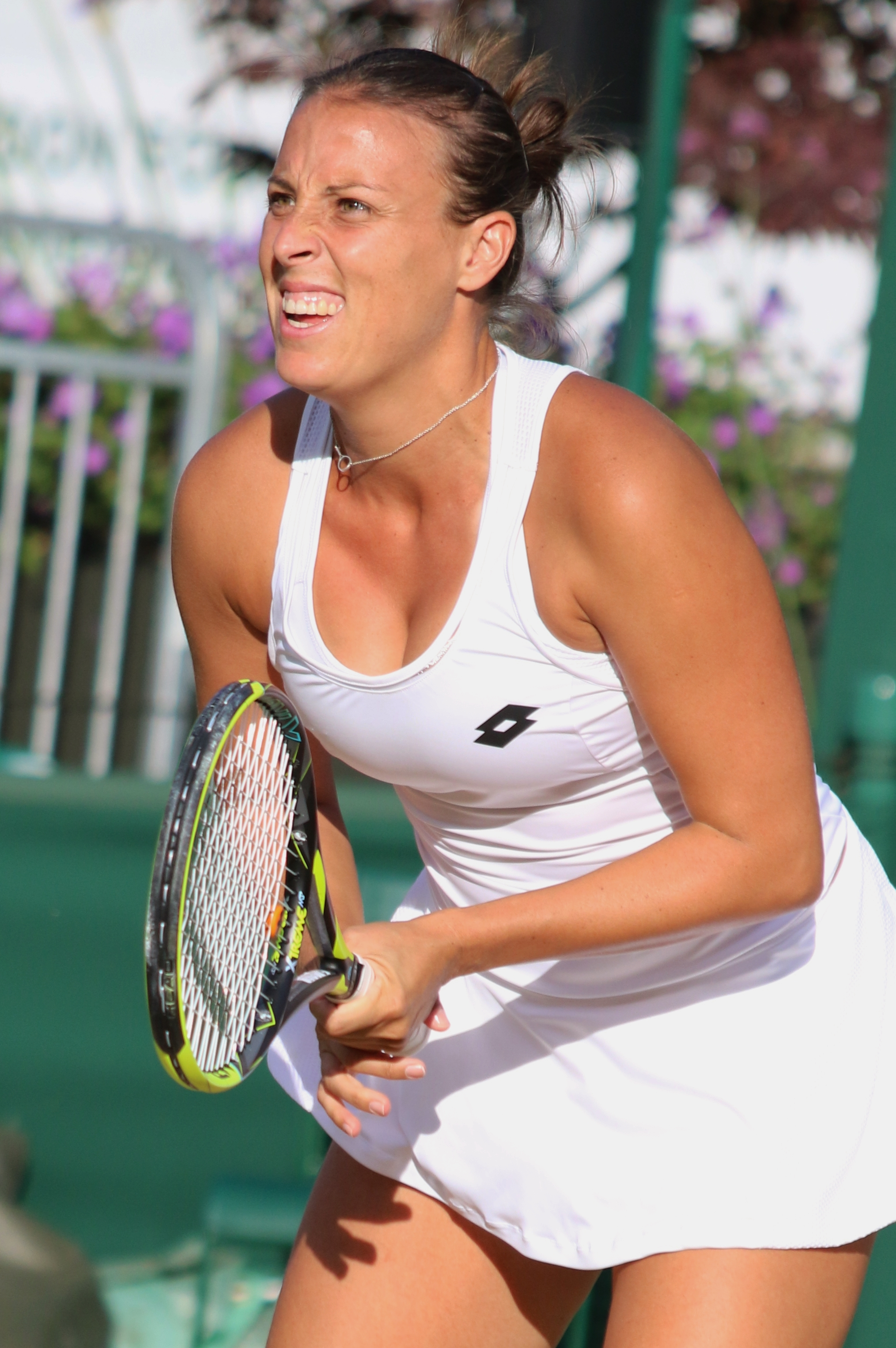
Andreja Klepač

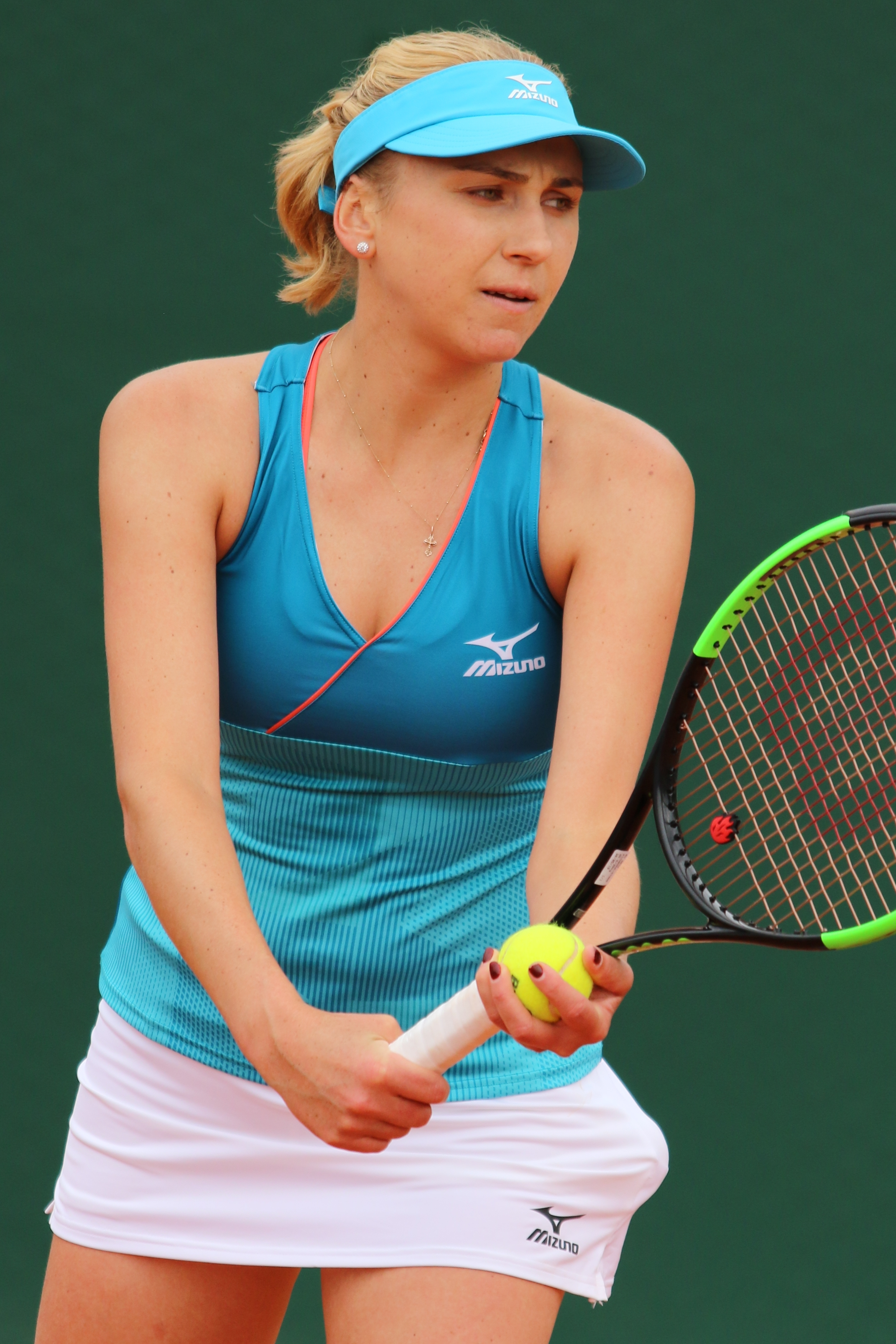
Lyudmyla Kichenok

- (Ukraine) Lyudmyla Kichenok / (Slovenia) Andreja Klepač def. (China) Duan Yingying / (China) Yang Zhaoxuan, 6–3, 6–3

== See also ==
- 2019 WTA Finals
- 2019 ATP Finals
