= 2019 Toray Pan Pacific Open – Doubles =

Doubles
- 2019 Toray Pan Pacific Open

Final
- Champions: (Chinese Taipei) Chan Hao-ching (Chinese Taipei) Latisha Chan
- Runners-up: (Chinese Taipei) Hsieh Su-wei (Chinese Taipei) Hsieh Yu-chieh
- Score: 7–5, 7–5

Details
- Draw: 16
- Seeds: 4

Events
Singles	Doubles
- Toray Pan Pacific Open

Miyu Kato and Makoto Ninomiya were the defending champions but chose to participate with different partners. Kato played alongside Storm Sanders, but they lost in the first round to Gabriela Dabrowski and Caroline Garcia. Ninomiya partnered Eri Hozumi, but lost in the quarterfinals to Nadiia Kichenok and Abigail Spears.

Chan Hao-ching and Latisha Chan won the title, defeating Hsieh Su-wei and Hsieh Yu-chieh in the final, 7–5, 7–5.

== Seeds ==
1. (Germany) Anna-Lena Grönefeld / (Netherlands) Demi Schuurs (quarterfinals)
2. (Chinese Taipei) Chan Hao-ching / (Chinese Taipei) Latisha Chan (champions)
3. (United States) Nicole Melichar / (Czech Republic) Květa Peschke (first round)
4. (Croatia) Darija Jurak / (Slovenia) Katarina Srebotnik (first round)

== Draw ==
Key

- Q = Qualifier
- WC = Wild card
- LL = Lucky loser
- Alt = Alternate
- ITF = ITF entry
- PR = Protected ranking
- SR = Special ranking
- SE = Special exempt
- JE = Junior exempt
- JR = Junior Accelerator Programme entrant
- CO = College Accelerator Programme entrant
- NG = Next Gen Accelerator Program entrant
- w/o = Walkover
- r = Retired
- d = Defaulted

=== Draw ===
First round
1	(Germany) A-L Grönefeld (Netherlands) D Schuurs	6	7
WC	(Japan) M Kobori (Japan) A Shimizu	2	5
(Poland) A Rosolska (Ukraine) D Yastremska	4	0
(Chinese Taipei) S-w Hsieh (Chinese Taipei) Y-c Hsieh	6	6
3	(United States) N Melichar (Czech Republic) K Peschke	2	6^{3}
(Ukraine) N Kichenok (United States) A Spears	6	7^{7}
(Japan) E Hozumi (Japan) M Ninomiya	4	6	[10]
(Ukraine) L Kichenok (United States) A Riske	6	4	[0]
(Japan) M Doi (Japan) N Hibino	6	6
Alt	(United States) F Di Lorenzo (Poland) K Kawa	4	3
(Japan) S Aoyama (Japan) E Shibahara	6	6
4	(Croatia) D Jurak (Slovenia) K Srebotnik	3	1
(Japan) M Kato (Australia) S Sanders	4	6	[8]
(Canada) G Dabrowski (France) C Garcia	6	3	[10]
(Australia) M Adamczak (China) X Han	1	0
2	(Chinese Taipei) H-c Chan (Chinese Taipei) L Chan	6	6

Quarterfinals
1	(Germany) A-L Grönefeld (Netherlands) D Schuurs	3	5
(Chinese Taipei) S-w Hsieh (Chinese Taipei) Y-c Hsieh	6	7
(Ukraine) N Kichenok (United States) A Spears	2	6	[13]
(Japan) E Hozumi (Japan) M Ninomiya	6	1	[11]
(Japan) M Doi (Japan) N Hibino	6	6
(Japan) S Aoyama (Japan) E Shibahara	4	3
(Canada) G Dabrowski (France) C Garcia	2	6	[8]
2	(Chinese Taipei) H-c Chan (Chinese Taipei) L Chan	6	4	[10]

Semifinals
(Chinese Taipei) S-w Hsieh (Chinese Taipei) Y-c Hsieh	7^{7}	1	[10]
(Ukraine) N Kichenok (United States) A Spears	6^{4}	6	[5]
(Japan) M Doi (Japan) N Hibino	1	6	[7]
2	(Chinese Taipei) H-c Chan (Chinese Taipei) L Chan	6	2	[10]

Final
(Chinese Taipei) S-w Hsieh (Chinese Taipei) Y-c Hsieh	5	5
2	(Chinese Taipei) H-c Chan (Chinese Taipei) L Chan	7	7
