= 2019 Wuhan Open – Doubles =

Doubles
- 2019 Wuhan Open

Final
- Champions: (China) Duan Yingying (Russia) Veronika Kudermetova
- Runners-up: (Belgium) Elise Mertens (Belarus) Aryna Sabalenka
- Score: 7–6^{(7–3)}, 6–2

Details
- Draw: 28
- Seeds: 8

Events
Singles	Doubles
- Wuhan Open

Elise Mertens and Demi Schuurs were the defending champions, but chose not to participate together. Schuurs teamed up with Anna-Lena Grönefeld, but lost in the semifinals to Mertens and Aryna Sabalenka.

Duan Yingying and Veronika Kudermetova won the title, defeating Mertens and Sabalenka in the final, 7–6^{(7–3)}, 6–2.

== Seeds ==
The top four seeds received a bye into the second round.

1. (Chinese Taipei) Hsieh Su-wei / (Czech Republic) Barbora Strýcová (second round)
2. (Belgium) Elise Mertens / (Belarus) Aryna Sabalenka (final)
3. (Canada) Gabriela Dabrowski / (China) Xu Yifan (second round)
4. (Germany) Anna-Lena Grönefeld / (Netherlands) Demi Schuurs (semifinals)
5. (Australia) Samantha Stosur / (China) Zhang Shuai (second round)
6. (Chinese Taipei) Chan Hao-ching / (Chinese Taipei) Latisha Chan (quarterfinals)
7. (United States) Nicole Melichar / (Czech Republic) Květa Peschke (quarterfinals)
8. (China) Duan Yingying / (Russia) Veronika Kudermetova (champions)

== Draw ==
Key

- Q = Qualifier
- WC = Wild card
- LL = Lucky loser
- Alt = Alternate
- ITF = ITF entry
- PR = Protected ranking
- SR = Special ranking
- SE = Special exempt
- JE = Junior exempt
- JR = Junior Accelerator Programme entrant
- CO = College Accelerator Programme entrant
- NG = Next Gen Accelerator Program entrant
- w/o = Walkover
- r = Retired
- d = Defaulted

=== Finals ===
Semifinals
8	(China) Duan Yingying (Russia) Veronika Kudermetova	6	6
(Japan) Makoto Ninomiya (China) Yang Zhaoxuan	3	1
4	(Germany) Anna-Lena Grönefeld (Netherlands) Demi Schuurs	2	1
2	(Belgium) Elise Mertens (Belarus) Aryna Sabalenka	6	6

Final
8	(China) Duan Yingying (Russia) Veronika Kudermetova	7^{7}	6
2	(Belgium) Elise Mertens (Belarus) Aryna Sabalenka	6^{3}	2

=== Top half ===
First round
(Australia) E Perez (Poland) A Rosolska	3	4
(Ukraine) N Kichenok (United States) A Spears	6	6
WC	(China) Q Tang (China) Xin Wang	6^{3}	6	[8]
(Romania) S Halep (Romania) R Olaru	7^{7}	4	[10]
WC	(Netherlands) K Bertens (Netherlands) L Pattinama Kerkhove	6	5	[7]
8	(China) Y Duan (Russia) V Kudermetova	3	7	[10]
(Japan) M Ninomiya (China) Z Yang	6	6
(Japan) S Aoyama (Japan) E Shibahara	4	4
(Georgia (country)) O Kalashnikova (United States) V King	7	3	[10]
(Australia) M Adamczak (China) X Han	5	6	[8]
(Australia) S Sanders (Ukraine) D Yastremska	4	1
7	(United States) N Melichar (Czech Republic) K Peschke	6	6

Second round
1	(Chinese Taipei) S-w Hsieh (Czech Republic) B Strýcová	4	6	[11]
(Ukraine) N Kichenok (United States) A Spears	6	2	[13]
(Romania) S Halep (Romania) R Olaru
8	(China) Y Duan (Russia) V Kudermetova	w/o
3	(Canada) G Dabrowski (China) Y Xu	6^{7}	5
(Japan) M Ninomiya (China) Z Yang	7^{9}	7
(Georgia (country)) O Kalashnikova (United States) V King	5	1
7	(United States) N Melichar (Czech Republic) K Peschke	7	6

Quarterfinals
(Ukraine) N Kichenok (United States) A Spears	4	6^{2}
8	(China) Y Duan (Russia) V Kudermetova	6	7^{7}
(Japan) M Ninomiya (China) Z Yang	6	6^{4}	[10]
7	(United States) N Melichar (Czech Republic) K Peschke	4	7^{7}	[6]

Semifinals
8	(China) Y Duan (Russia) V Kudermetova	6	6
(Japan) M Ninomiya (China) Z Yang	3	1

=== Bottom half ===
First round
6	(Chinese Taipei) H-c Chan (Chinese Taipei) L Chan	6	6
(United States) A Riske (Slovenia) K Srebotnik	3	2
(Russia) A Blinkova (Czech Republic) R Voráčová	7	6
(United States) K Christian (Australia) J Moore	5	1
(Russia) D Kasatkina (Australia) A Tomljanović	6^{5}	3
(United States) S Kenin (Belarus) A Sasnovich	7^{7}	6
5	(Australia) S Stosur (China) S Zhang	6	7
(Russia) E Alexandrova (Czech Republic) K Siniaková	3	5
WC	(France) C Garcia (United States) B Mattek-Sands	6	6
(Croatia) D Jurak (Spain) MJ Martínez Sánchez	1	4
(China) S Peng (China) Y Wang	4	7	[2]
(Ukraine) L Kichenok (United States) D Krawczyk	6	5	[10]

Second round
6	(Chinese Taipei) H-c Chan (Chinese Taipei) L Chan	6	6
(Russia) A Blinkova (Czech Republic) R Voráčová	3	2
(United States) S Kenin (Belarus) A Sasnovich	4	6	[10]
4	(Germany) A-L Grönefeld (Netherlands) D Schuurs	6	3	[12]
5	(Australia) S Stosur (China) S Zhang	4	6^{2}
WC	(France) C Garcia (United States) B Mattek-Sands	6	7^{7}
(Ukraine) L Kichenok (United States) D Krawczyk	1	3
2	(Belgium) E Mertens (Belarus) A Sabalenka	6	6

Quarterfinals
6	(Chinese Taipei) H-c Chan (Chinese Taipei) L Chan	1	1
4	(Germany) A-L Grönefeld (Netherlands) D Schuurs	6	6
WC	(France) C Garcia (United States) B Mattek-Sands	5	3
2	(Belgium) E Mertens (Belarus) A Sabalenka	7	6

Semifinals
4	(Germany) A-L Grönefeld (Netherlands) D Schuurs	2	1
2	(Belgium) E Mertens (Belarus) A Sabalenka	6	6
