= 2019 Silicon Valley Classic – Doubles =

Doubles
- 2019 Silicon Valley Classic

Final
- Champions: (United States) Nicole Melichar (Czech Republic) Květa Peschke
- Runners-up: (Japan) Shuko Aoyama (Japan) Ena Shibahara
- Score: 6−4, 6−4

Events
Singles	Doubles
← 2018 ·	Silicon Valley Classic	· 2021 →

Latisha Chan and Květa Peschke were the defending champions but Chan chose not to participate.

Peschke played alongside Nicole Melichar and successfully defended her title, defeating Shuko Aoyama and Ena Shibahara in the final, 6−4, 6−4.

== Seeds ==
1. (United States) Nicole Melichar / (Czech Republic) Květa Peschke (champions)
2. (United States) Desirae Krawczyk / (Poland) Alicja Rosolska (semifinals)
3. (Ukraine) Lyudmyla Kichenok / (Ukraine) Nadiia Kichenok (quarterfinals)
4. (Romania) Mihaela Buzărnescu / (China) Zhang Shuai (first round)

== Draw ==
=== Key ===
- Q = Qualifier
- WC = Wild card
- LL = Lucky loser
- Alt = Alternate
- SE = Special exempt
- PR = Protected ranking
- ITF = ITF entry
- JE = Junior exempt
- w/o = Walkover
- r = Retired
- d = Defaulted
- SR = Special ranking

=== Draw ===
First round
(United States) B Mattek-Sands (China) S Peng	2	4
(Japan) E Hozumi (Japan) M Ninomiya	6	6
4	(Romania) M Buzărnescu (China) S Zhang	3	6	[5]
(Chinese Taipei) E-s Liang (China) S Zheng	6	1	[10]
(New Zealand) E Routliffe (United States) S Santamaria	2	6	[8]
(Australia) E Perez (United Kingdom) H Watson	6	4	[10]
(Japan) S Aoyama (Japan) E Shibahara	6	6
(Greece) M Sakkari (Australia) A Tomljanović	2	4
(Czech Republic) M Bouzková (Australia) P Hon	6^{5}	2
3	(Ukraine) L Kichenok (Ukraine) N Kichenok	7^{7}	6
(United States) K Ahn (United States) M Brengle	2	4
(Australia) M Adamczak (Australia) S Sanders	6	6

Quarterfinals
1	(United States) N Melichar (Czech Republic) K Peschke	7^{7}	6
(Japan) E Hozumi (Japan) M Ninomiya	6^{3}	1
(Chinese Taipei) E-s Liang (China) S Zheng	7^{8}	0	[10]
(Australia) E Perez (United Kingdom) H Watson	6^{6}	6	[8]
(Japan) S Aoyama (Japan) E Shibahara	6	6
3	(Ukraine) L Kichenok (Ukraine) N Kichenok	1	4
(Australia) M Adamczak (Australia) S Sanders	6	5	[8]
2	(United States) D Krawczyk (Poland) A Rosolska	4	7	[10]

Semifinals
1	(United States) N Melichar (Czech Republic) K Peschke	6	4	[10]
(Chinese Taipei) E-s Liang (China) S Zheng	4	6	[3]
(Japan) S Aoyama (Japan) E Shibahara	3	6	[10]
2	(United States) D Krawczyk (Poland) A Rosolska	6	3	[5]

Final
1	(United States) N Melichar (Czech Republic) K Peschke	6	6
(Japan) S Aoyama (Japan) E Shibahara	4	4
