= 2019 Qatar Total Open =

- Date: 11–16 February
- Edition: 17th
- Category: Premier
- Draw: 28S / 16D
- Prize money: $916,131
- Surface: Hard
- Location: Doha, Qatar
- Venue: Khalifa International Tennis and Squash Complex

Champions

Singles
- (Belgium) Elise Mertens

Doubles
- (Chinese Taipei) Chan Hao-ching / (Chinese Taipei) Latisha Chan
← 2018 ·	Qatar Open	· 2020 →

The 2019 Qatar Total Open was a professional women's tennis tournament played on hard courts. It was the 17th edition of the event and a Premier tournament on the 2019 WTA Tour. It took place at the International Tennis and Squash complex in Doha, Qatar between 11 and 16 February 2019.

== Point distribution ==
Event	W	F	SF	QF	Round of 16	Round of 32	Q	Q3	Q2	Q1
Singles	470	305	185	100	55	1	25	18	13	1
Doubles	470	305	185	100	1	—	—	—	—	—

== Prize money ==
Event	W	F	SF	QF	Round of 16	Round of 32^{1}	Q3	Q2	Q1
Singles	$158,895	$84,850	$45,320	$24,360	$13,065	$8,290	$3,720	$1,980	$1,100
Doubles*	$49,700	$26,546	$14,510	$7,385	$4,010	—	—	—	—

_{^{1}Qualifiers prize money is also the Round of 32 prize money.}
_{*per team}

== Singles main-draw entrants ==
=== Seeds ===
Country	Player	Rank^{1}	Seed
ROU	Simona Halep	3	1
~~CZE~~	~~Karolína Plíšková~~	~~5~~	~~2~~
GER	Angelique Kerber	6	3
UKR	Elina Svitolina	7	4
NED	Kiki Bertens	8	5
~~DEN~~	~~Caroline Wozniacki~~	~~10~~	~~6~~
LAT	Anastasija Sevastova	12	7
~~AUS~~	~~Ashleigh Barty~~	~~13~~	~~8~~
GER	Julia Görges	16	9

- ^{1} Rankings as of February 4, 2019.

=== Other entrants ===
The following players received wildcards into the singles main draw:

- (Oman) Fatma Al-Nabhani
- (Tunisia) Ons Jabeur
- (Ukraine) Elina Svitolina
- ~~(Denmark) Caroline Wozniacki~~

The following players received entry from the qualifying draw:

- (Russia) Anna Blinkova
- (Czech Republic) Karolína Muchová
- (Australia) Ajla Tomljanović
- (China) Zhu Lin

The following players received entry as lucky losers:

- (Spain) Lara Arruabarrena
- (Slovenia) Polona Hercog
- (Czech Republic) Kristýna Plíšková
- (United States) Alison Riske
- (Australia) Samantha Stosur

=== Withdrawals ===
Before the tournament

- (Australia) Ashleigh Barty → replaced by (Slovenia) Polona Hercog
- (France) Caroline Garcia → replaced by (Spain) Lara Arruabarrena
- (United States) Madison Keys → replaced by (Czech Republic) Kateřina Siniaková
- (Japan) Naomi Osaka → replaced by (Czech Republic) Barbora Strýcová
- (Czech Republic) Karolína Plíšková → replaced by (Czech Republic) Kristýna Plíšková
- (China) Wang Qiang → replaced by (United States) Alison Riske
- (Denmark) Caroline Wozniacki → replaced by (Australia) Samantha Stosur

== Doubles main-draw entrants ==
=== Seeds ===
Country	Player	Country	Player	Rank^{1}	Seed
USA	Nicole Melichar	CZE	Květa Peschke	24	1
TPE	Hsieh Su-wei	CZE	Barbora Strýcová	27	2
CAN	Gabriela Dabrowski	CHN	Xu Yifan	28	3
GER	Anna-Lena Grönefeld	NED	Demi Schuurs	40	4

- Rankings are as of February 4, 2019.

=== Other entrants ===
The following pairs received wildcards into the doubles main draw:

- (Oman) Fatma Al-Nabhani / (Qatar) Mubaraka Al-Naimi
- ~~(Czech Republic) Karolína Plíšková / (Czech Republic) Kristýna Plíšková~~

The following pair received entry as alternates:

- (Tunisia) Ons Jabeur / (United States) Alison Riske

=== Withdrawals ===
Before the tournament

- (Czech Republic) Karolína Plíšková (viral illness)

== Champions ==
=== Singles ===
- (Belgium) Elise Mertens def. (Romania) Simona Halep, 3–6, 6–4, 6–3

=== Doubles ===
- (Chinese Taipei) Chan Hao-ching / (Chinese Taipei) Latisha Chan def. (Germany) Anna-Lena Grönefeld / (Netherlands) Demi Schuurs, 6–1, 3–6, [10–6]
