= 2019 Grand Prix SAR La Princesse Lalla Meryem – Singles =

Singles
- 2019 Grand Prix SAR La Princesse Lalla Meryem

Final
- Champion: (Greece) Maria Sakkari
- Runner-up: (United Kingdom) Johanna Konta
- Score: 2–6, 6–4, 6–1

Events
| Singles | Doubles |
- Grand Prix SAR La Princesse Lalla Meryem

Elise Mertens was the defending champion, but lost in the quarterfinals to Maria Sakkari.

Sakkari went on to win her first WTA Tour title, defeating Johanna Konta in the final, 2–6, 6–4, 6–1. Sakkari became the first Greek player to win a WTA title since Eleni Daniilidou in Hobart in 2008.

== Seeds ==
1. (Belgium) Elise Mertens (quarterfinals)
2. (Chinese Taipei) Hsieh Su-wei (quarterfinals)
3. (Kazakhstan) Yulia Putintseva (first round)
4. (Australia) Ajla Tomljanović (semifinals)
5. (Croatia) Petra Martić (withdrew)
6. (Greece) Maria Sakkari (champion)
7. (United Kingdom) Johanna Konta (final)
8. (Belgium) Alison Van Uytvanck (semifinals)

== Draw ==
Key

- Q = Qualifier
- WC = Wild card
- LL = Lucky loser
- Alt = Alternate
- ITF = ITF entry
- PR = Protected ranking
- SR = Special ranking
- SE = Special exempt
- JE = Junior exempt
- JR = Junior Accelerator Programme entrant
- CO = College Accelerator Programme entrant
- NG = Next Gen Accelerator Program entrant
- w/o = Walkover
- r = Retired
- d = Defaulted

=== Finals ===
Semifinals
6 | (Greece) Maria Sakkari | 6 | 6
8 | (Belgium) Alison Van Uytvanck | 4 | 4
4 | (Australia) Ajla Tomljanović | 2 | 6^{7}
7 | (United Kingdom) Johanna Konta | 6 | 7^{9}

Final
6 | (Greece) Maria Sakkari | 2 | 6 | 6
7 | (United Kingdom) Johanna Konta | 6 | 4 | 1

=== Top half ===
First round
1/WC | (Belgium) E Mertens | 6 | 6
(Belgium) K Flipkens | 3 | 1
(Poland) M Linette | 3 | 2
(Serbia) I Jorović | 6 | 6
(Germany) T Maria | 4 | 2
WC | (Bulgaria) I Shinikova | 6 | 6
Q | (Serbia) O Danilović | 0 | 2
6 | (Greece) M Sakkari | 6 | 6
3 | (Kazakhstan) Y Putintseva | 6 | 4 | 3
(Slovenia) T Zidanšek | 3 | 6 | 6
(Slovakia) M Rybáriková | 6 | 1 | 6^{7}
Q | (Belgium) Y Bonaventure | 2 | 6 | 7^{9}
(Spain) S Sorribes Tormo | 3 | 3
Q | (United States) V Lepchenko | 6 | 6
(France) P Parmentier | 4 | 3
8 | (Belgium) A Van Uytvanck | 6 | 6

Second round
1/WC | (Belgium) E Mertens | 6 | 6
(Serbia) I Jorović | 4 | 0
WC | (Bulgaria) I Shinikova | 4 | 4
6 | (Greece) M Sakkari | 6 | 6
(Slovenia) T Zidanšek | 4 | 6 | 3
Q | (Belgium) Y Bonaventure | 6 | 2 | 6
Q | (United States) V Lepchenko | 4 | 0
8 | (Belgium) A Van Uytvanck | 6 | 6

Quarterfinals
1/WC | (Belgium) E Mertens | 4 | 6^{2}
6 | (Greece) M Sakkari | 6 | 7^{7}
Q | (Belgium) Y Bonaventure | 7 | 1 | 2
8 | (Belgium) A Van Uytvanck | 5 | 6 | 6

Semifinals
6 | (Greece) M Sakkari | 6 | 6
8 | (Belgium) A Van Uytvanck | 4 | 4

=== Bottom half ===
First round
LL | (Romania) I Bara | 6^{1} | 4
(Slovenia) P Hercog | 7^{7} | 6
(Sweden) R Peterson | 7^{7} | 6
(Switzerland) V Golubic | 6^{4} | 3
WC | (Switzerland) T Bacsinszky | 6 | 6
(Sweden) J Larsson | 3 | 1
Q | (France) F Ferro | 4 | 4
4 | (Australia) A Tomljanović | 6 | 6
7 | (United Kingdom) J Konta | 4 | 7^{7} | 6
(China) Y Wang | 6 | 6^{0} | 4
(Romania) A Bogdan | 6 | 6
(France) A Cornet | 3 | 3
(Russia) V Zvonareva | 6^{8} | 5
(Spain) L Arruabarrena | 7^{10} | 7
(Australia) D Gavrilova | 1 | 6 | 2
2 | (Chinese Taipei) S-w Hsieh | 6 | 3 | 6

Second round
(Slovenia) P Hercog | 5 | 6 | 1
(Sweden) R Peterson | 7 | 3 | 6
WC | (Switzerland) T Bacsinszky | 4 | 6 | 2
4 | (Australia) A Tomljanović | 6 | 1 | 6
7 | (United Kingdom) J Konta | 6 | 6^{6} | 6
(Romania) A Bogdan | 1 | 7^{8} | 2
(Spain) L Arruabarrena | 6 | 5 | 3
2 | (Chinese Taipei) S-w Hsieh | 4 | 7 | 6

Quarterfinals
(Sweden) R Peterson | 2 | 4
4 | (Australia) A Tomljanović | 6 | 6
7 | (United Kingdom) J Konta | 6^{1} | 6 | 6
2 | (Chinese Taipei) S-w Hsieh | 7^{7} | 4 | 4

Semifinals
4 | (Australia) A Tomljanović | 2 | 6^{7}
7 | (United Kingdom) J Konta | 6 | 7^{9}

== Qualifying ==
=== Seeds ===
1. (France) Fiona Ferro (qualified)
2. (Serbia) Ivana Jorović (moved to main draw)
3. (Serbia) Olga Danilović (qualified)
4. (Belgium) Ysaline Bonaventure (qualified)
5. (United Kingdom) Harriet Dart (first round)
6. (Romania) Monica Niculescu (qualifying competition, retired)
7. (United States) Varvara Lepchenko (qualified)
8. (Italy) Martina Trevisan (second round)

=== Qualifiers ===
1. (France) Fiona Ferro
2. (United States) Varvara Lepchenko
3. (Serbia) Olga Danilović
4. (Belgium) Ysaline Bonaventure

=== Lucky loser ===
1. (Romania) Irina Bara

=== Draw ===
==== First qualifier ====
First round
1 | (France) Fiona Ferro | 6 | 4 | 7
(Australia) Arina Rodionova | 4 | 6 | 5
WC | (France) Fiona Codino | 1 | 2
(Italy) Sara Errani | 6 | 6
(Spain) Georgina García Pérez | 4 | 6^{1}
(Belgium) Greet Minnen | 6 | 7^{7}
(France) Harmony Tan | 6 | 7^{7}
5 | (United Kingdom) Harriet Dart | 2 | 6^{3}

Second round
1 | (France) Fiona Ferro | 1 | 6 | 6
(Italy) Sara Errani | 6 | 3 | 4
(Belgium) Greet Minnen | 6 | 7^{7}
(France) Harmony Tan | 2 | 6^{2}

Qualifying competition
1 | (France) Fiona Ferro | 7^{7} | 0 | 6
(Belgium) Greet Minnen | 6^{3} | 6 | 3

==== Second qualifier ====
First round
(Netherlands) Lesley Kerkhove | 6 | 6^{4} | 4
(Turkey) Pemra Özgen | 2 | 7^{7} | 6
(Hungary) Panna Udvardy | 6 | 6
WC | (Morocco) Rita Atik | 0 | 1
(Russia) Liudmila Samsonova | 4 | 6^{1}
7 | (United States) Varvara Lepchenko | 6 | 7^{7}

Second round
Bye
(Turkey) Pemra Özgen
(Hungary) Panna Udvardy | 2 | 0
7 | (United States) Varvara Lepchenko | 6 | 6

Qualifying competition
(Turkey) Pemra Özgen | 3 | 4
7 | (United States) Varvara Lepchenko | 6 | 6

==== Third qualifier ====
First round
3 | (Serbia) Olga Danilović | 6 | 6
WC | (Morocco) Lina Qostal | 1 | 2
(Kazakhstan) Anna Danilina | 7^{7} | 6
(Australia) Zoe Hives | 6^{2} | 4
(Netherlands) Bibiane Schoofs | 6 | 1 | 6
(Germany) Sabine Lisicki | 3 | 6 | 1
(Brazil) Carolina Alves | 3 | 3
6 | (Romania) Monica Niculescu | 6 | 6

Second round
3 | (Serbia) Olga Danilović | 7 | 6
(Kazakhstan) Anna Danilina | 5 | 3
(Netherlands) Bibiane Schoofs | 0 | 4
6 | (Romania) Monica Niculescu | 6 | 6

Qualifying competition
3 | (Serbia) Olga Danilović | 4
6 | (Romania) Monica Niculescu | 4^{r}

==== Fourth qualifier ====
First round
4 | (Belgium) Ysaline Bonaventure | 6 | 6
WC | (Kazakhstan) Galina Voskoboeva | 4 | 1
(Brazil) Laura Pigossi | 1 | 0
(Poland) Magdalena Fręch | 6 | 6
(Romania) Irina Bara | 6 | 4 | 5
(Croatia) Tereza Mrdeža | 4 | 6 | 5^{r}
WC | (Burundi) Sada Nahimana | 2 | 5
8 | (Italy) Martina Trevisan | 6 | 7

Second round
4 | (Belgium) Ysaline Bonaventure | 6 | 6^{3} | 6
(Poland) Magdalena Fręch | 2 | 7^{7} | 1
(Romania) Irina Bara | 3 | 6 | 6
8 | (Italy) Martina Trevisan | 6 | 4 | 3

Qualifying competition
4 | (Belgium) Ysaline Bonaventure | 6 | 6
(Romania) Irina Bara | 1 | 2
