= 2019 Toray Pan Pacific Open =

- Date: 16–22 September
- Edition: 36th
- Category: WTA Premier
- Draw: 28S / 16D
- Prize money: $823,000
- Surface: Hard / outdoor
- Location: Osaka, Japan
- Venue: Utsubo Tennis Center

Champions

Singles
- (Japan) Naomi Osaka

Doubles
- (Chinese Taipei) Chan Hao-ching / (Chinese Taipei) Latisha Chan
← 2018 ·	Pan Pacific Open	· 2022 →

The 2019 Toray Pan Pacific Open was a professional women's tennis tournament played on outdoor hard courts. It was the 36th edition of the Pan Pacific Open, and part of the Premier Series of the 2019 WTA Tour. It took place at the ITC Utsubo Tennis Center in Osaka, Japan, on 16–22 September 2019. This was the only time Osaka hosting the tournament after Tokyo was in preparation for the Summer Olympics the following year.

== Finals ==
=== Singles ===
- (Japan) Naomi Osaka defeated (Russia) Anastasia Pavlyuchenkova, 6–2, 6–3

=== Doubles ===
- (Chinese Taipei) Chan Hao-ching / (Chinese Taipei) Latisha Chan defeated (Chinese Taipei) Hsieh Su-wei / (Chinese Taipei) Hsieh Yu-chieh, 7–5, 7–5

== Points and prize money ==
=== Point distribution ===
Event	W	F	SF	QF	Round of 16	Round of 32	Q	Q2	Q1
Singles	470	305	185	100	55	1	25	13	1
Doubles	470	305	185	100	1	—	—	—	—

=== Prize money ===
Event	W	F	SF	QF	Round of 16	Round of 32^{*}	Q2	Q1
Singles	$137,125	$76,063	$39,080	$21,010	$11,265	$7,150	$3,447	$1,750
Doubles	$42,850	$22,900	$12,510	$6,365	$3,460	—	—	—
Doubles prize money per team

^* Qualifiers prize money is also the round of 32 prize money

== Singles main-draw entrants ==
=== Seeds ===
Country	Player	Rank^{1}	Seed
JPN	Naomi Osaka	4	1
NED	Kiki Bertens	8	2
USA	Sloane Stephens	14	3
GER	Angelique Kerber	15	4
USA	Madison Keys	16	5
~~LAT~~	~~Anastasija Sevastova~~	~~18~~	~~6~~
CRO	Donna Vekić	21	7
~~CRO~~	~~Petra Martić~~	~~23~~	~~8~~
BEL	Elise Mertens	24	9

- Rankings are as of September 9, 2019

=== Other entrants ===
The following players received wild cards into the main singles draw:

- (Japan) Misaki Doi
- (Japan) Nao Hibino

The following players received entry from the singles qualifying draw:

- (France) Alizé Cornet
- (Kazakhstan) Zarina Diyas
- (Russia) Varvara Flink
- (United States) Nicole Gibbs
- (China) Han Xinyun
- (Bulgaria) Viktoriya Tomova

The following players received entry as lucky losers:

- (United States) Whitney Osuigwe
- (Poland) Katarzyna Kawa

=== Withdrawals ===
- (Canada) Bianca Andreescu → replaced by (Puerto Rico) Monica Puig
- (Switzerland) Belinda Bencic → replaced by (United States) Alison Riske
- (Estonia) Anett Kontaveit → replaced by (Russia) Anastasia Pavlyuchenkova
- (Croatia) Petra Martić → replaced by (Poland) Katarzyna Kawa
- (Latvia) Anastasija Sevastova → replaced by (United States) Whitney Osuigwe
- (Czech Republic) Markéta Vondroušová → replaced by (Kazakhstan) Yulia Putintseva

=== Retirements ===
- (United States) Madison Keys (left foot injury)

== Doubles main-draw entrants ==
=== Seeds ===
Country	Player	Country	Player	Rank^{1}	Seed
GER	Anna-Lena Grönefeld	NED	Demi Schuurs	24	1
TPE	Chan Hao-ching	TPE	Latisha Chan	32	2
USA	Nicole Melichar	CZE	Květa Peschke	38	3
CRO	Darija Jurak	SLO	Katarina Srebotnik	82	4

- Rankings are as of September 9, 2019

=== Other entrants ===
The following pair received a wildcard into the doubles main draw:

- (Japan) Momoko Kobori / (Japan) Ayano Shimizu

The following pair received entry as alternates:

- (United States) Francesca Di Lorenzo / (Poland) Katarzyna Kawa

=== Withdrawals ===
Before the tournament

- (Latvia) Anastasija Sevastova (gastrointestinal illness)
