= 2019 Porsche Tennis Grand Prix =

- Date: 22–28 April
- Edition: 42nd
- Category: Premier
- Draw: 28S / 16D
- Prize money: $886,077
- Surface: Clay (indoor)
- Location: Stuttgart, Germany
- Venue: Porsche-Arena

Champions

Singles
- (Czech Republic) Petra Kvitová

Doubles
- (Germany) Mona Barthel / (Germany) Anna-Lena Friedsam
← 2018 ·	Porsche Tennis Grand Prix	· 2021 →

The 2019 Porsche Tennis Grand Prix was a women's tennis tournament played on indoor clay courts. It was the 42nd edition of the Porsche Tennis Grand Prix, and part of the Premier tournaments of the 2019 WTA Tour. It took place at the Porsche Arena in Stuttgart, Germany, from 22 April until 28 April 2019. Third-seeded Petra Kvitová won the singles title.

== Finals ==
=== Singles ===
(Czech Republic) Petra Kvitová defeated (Estonia) Anett Kontaveit, 6–3, 7–6^{(7–2)}

- It was Kvitova's 2nd title of the season and the 27th of her career.

=== Doubles ===
(Germany) Mona Barthel / (Germany) Anna-Lena Friedsam defeated (Russia) Anastasia Pavlyuchenkova / (Czech Republic) Lucie Šafářová, 2–6, 6–3, [10–6]

== Points and prize money ==
=== Point distribution ===
Event	W	F	SF	QF	Round of 16	Round of 32	Q	Q3	Q2	Q1
Singles	470	305	185	100	55	1	25	18	13	1
Doubles	470	305	185	100	1	—	—	—	—	—

=== Prize money ===
Event	W	F	SF	QF	Round of 16	Round of 32	Q3	Q2	Q1
Singles	€107,036	€57,157	€30,536	€16,411	€8,798	€5,585	€2,508	€1,333	€742
Doubles *	€33,482	€17,885	€9,774	€4,974	€2,702	—	—	—	—

_{* per team}

== Singles main draw entrants ==
=== Seeds ===
Country	Player	Ranking^{1}	Seed
JPN	Naomi Osaka	1	1
~~ROU~~	~~Simona Halep~~	~~2~~	~~2~~
CZE	Petra Kvitová	3	3
CZE	Karolína Plíšková	4	4
GER	Angelique Kerber	5	5
NED	Kiki Bertens	7	6
LAT	Anastasija Sevastova	13	7
EST	Anett Kontaveit	15	8

- ^{1} Rankings are as of 15 April 2019.

=== Other entrants ===
The following players received wildcards into the main draw:

- (Slovakia) Dominika Cibulková
- (Germany) Andrea Petkovic
- (Germany) Laura Siegemund

The following players received entry from the qualifying draw:

- (Germany) Anna-Lena Friedsam
- (Luxembourg) Mandy Minella
- (Belgium) Greet Minnen
- (Spain) Sara Sorribes Tormo

The following players received entry as lucky losers:

- (Italy) Giulia Gatto-Monticone
- (Russia) Vera Zvonareva

=== Withdrawals ===
Before the tournament

- (United States) Danielle Collins → replaced by (Chinese Taipei) Hsieh Su-wei
- (Romania) Simona Halep → replaced by (Italy) Giulia Gatto-Monticone
- (Spain) Garbiñe Muguruza → replaced by (Russia) Vera Zvonareva
- (United States) Sloane Stephens → replaced by (Russia) Anastasia Pavlyuchenkova
- (Ukraine) Elina Svitolina → replaced by (Ukraine) Lesia Tsurenko

During the tournament

- (Japan) Naomi Osaka (abdominal injury)

=== Retirements ===
- (Belarus) Victoria Azarenka (right shoulder injury)
- (Germany) Julia Görges (neck injury)

== Doubles main draw entrants ==
=== Seeds ===
Country	Player	Country	Player	Rank^{1}	Seed
USA	Nicole Melichar	CZE	Květa Peschke	25	1
GER	Anna-Lena Grönefeld	NED	Demi Schuurs	33	2
JPN	Makoto Ninomiya	USA	Abigail Spears	57	3
USA	Raquel Atawo	SLO	Katarina Srebotnik	60	4

- ^{1} Rankings as of April 15, 2019.

=== Other entrants ===
The following pair received a wildcard into the main draw:

- (Germany) Mona Barthel / (Germany) Anna-Lena Friedsam
- (Russia) Anastasia Pavlyuchenkova / (Czech Republic) Lucie Šafářová
