= 2019 Toray Pan Pacific Open – Singles =

Singles
- 2019 Toray Pan Pacific Open

Final
- Champion: (Japan) Naomi Osaka
- Runner-up: (Russia) Anastasia Pavlyuchenkova
- Score: 6–2, 6–3

Details
- Draw: 28
- Seeds: 8

Events
Singles	Doubles
- Toray Pan Pacific Open

Karolína Plíšková was the defending champion, but chose not to participate.

Naomi Osaka won the title, defeating Anastasia Pavlyuchenkova in the final, 6–2, 6–3. She became the first Japanese player to win the tournament since Kimiko Date in 1995.

== Seeds ==
The top four seeds received a bye into the second round.

1. (Japan) Naomi Osaka (champion)
2. (Netherlands) Kiki Bertens (second round)
3. (United States) Sloane Stephens (second round)
4. (Germany) Angelique Kerber (semifinals)
5. (United States) Madison Keys (quarterfinals, retired)
6. (Latvia) Anastasija Sevastova (withdrew)
7. (Croatia) Donna Vekić (second round)
8. (Croatia) Petra Martić (withdrew)
9. (Belgium) Elise Mertens (semifinals)

== Draw ==
Key

- Q = Qualifier
- WC = Wild card
- LL = Lucky loser
- Alt = Alternate
- ITF = ITF entry
- PR = Protected ranking
- SR = Special ranking
- SE = Special exempt
- JE = Junior exempt
- JR = Junior Accelerator Programme entrant
- CO = College Accelerator Programme entrant
- NG = Next Gen Accelerator Program entrant
- w/o = Walkover
- r = Retired
- d = Defaulted

=== Finals ===
Semifinals
1	(Japan) Naomi Osaka	6	6
9	(Belgium) Elise Mertens	4	1
4	(Germany) Angelique Kerber	3	3
(Russia) Anastasia Pavlyuchenkova	6	6

Final
1	(Japan) Naomi Osaka	6	6
(Russia) Anastasia Pavlyuchenkova	2	3

=== Top half ===
First round
Q	(France) A Cornet	6	3	2
Q	(Bulgaria) V Tomova	4	6	6
WC	(Japan) N Hibino	4	5
Q	(Russia) V Flink	6	7
(Kazakhstan) Y Putintseva	6	7^{7}
LL	(Poland) K Kawa	4	6^{4}
Q	(China) X Han	6^{6}	1
(Italy) C Giorgi	7^{8}	6
(Spain) G Muguruza	6	6^{1}	1
(Chinese Taipei) S-w Hsieh	3	7^{7}	6
LL	(United States) W Osuigwe	3	1
9	(Belgium) E Mertens	6	6

Second round
1	(Japan) N Osaka	7	6
Q	(Bulgaria) V Tomova	5	3
Q	(Russia) V Flink	1	1
(Kazakhstan) Y Putintseva	6	6
3	(United States) S Stephens	0	3
(Italy) C Giorgi	6	6
(Chinese Taipei) S-w Hsieh	3	6	2
9	(Belgium) E Mertens	6	1	6

Quarterfinals
1	(Japan) N Osaka	6	6
(Kazakhstan) Y Putintseva	4	4
(Italy) C Giorgi	4	3
9	(Belgium) E Mertens	6	6

Semifinals
1	(Japan) N Osaka	6	6
9	(Belgium) E Mertens	4	1

=== Bottom half ===
First round
5	(United States) M Keys	6	6
(Russia) D Kasatkina	3	4
(Puerto Rico) M Puig	0	3
Q	(Kazakhstan) Z Diyas	6	6
(United States) A Riske	4	3
Q	(United States) N Gibbs	6	6
7	(Croatia) D Vekić	7	6
(France) C Garcia	5	2
(France) K Mladenovic	1	2
WC	(Japan) M Doi	6	6
(Ukraine) D Yastremska	3	1
(Russia) A Pavlyuchenkova	6	6

Second round
5	(United States) M Keys	5	6	6
Q	(Kazakhstan) Z Diyas	7	0	4
Q	(United States) N Gibbs	2	4
4	(Germany) A Kerber	6	6
7	(Croatia) D Vekić	6^{5}	3
WC	(Japan) M Doi	7^{7}	6
(Russia) A Pavlyuchenkova	6	7
2	(Netherlands) K Bertens	1	5

Quarterfinals
5	(United States) M Keys	4	6	1^{r}
4	(Germany) A Kerber	6	4	2
WC	(Japan) M Doi	2	2
(Russia) A Pavlyuchenkova	6	6

Semifinals
4	(Germany) A Kerber	3	3
(Russia) A Pavlyuchenkova	6	6

== Qualifying ==
=== Seeds ===
1. (France) Alizé Cornet (qualified)
2. (Kazakhstan) Zarina Diyas (qualified)
3. (Australia) Astra Sharma (first round, retired)
4. (United States) Whitney Osuigwe (qualifying competition, lucky loser)
5. (Poland) Katarzyna Kawa (qualifying competition, lucky loser)
6. (Russia) Liudmila Samsonova (qualifying competition)
7. (United States) Nicole Gibbs (qualified)
8. (United States) Francesca Di Lorenzo (first round)
9. (Slovakia) Kristína Kučová (first round)
10. (Russia) Varvara Flink (qualified)
11. (China) Han Xinyun (qualified)
12. (Japan) Kurumi Nara (qualifying competition)

=== Qualifiers ===
1. (France) Alizé Cornet
2. (Kazakhstan) Zarina Diyas
3. (China) Han Xinyun
4. (United States) Nicole Gibbs
5. (Russia) Varvara Flink
6. (Bulgaria) Viktoriya Tomova

=== Lucky losers ===
1. (United States) Whitney Osuigwe
2. (Poland) Katarzyna Kawa

=== Draw ===
==== First qualifier ====
First round
1	(France) Alizé Cornet	6	6
WC	(Japan) Moyuka Uchijima	0	4
(Japan) Momoko Kobori	3	2
12	(Japan) Kurumi Nara	6	6

Qualifying competition
1	(France) Alizé Cornet	6^{3}	7^{7}	6
12	(Japan) Kurumi Nara	7^{7}	6^{2}	2

==== Second qualifier ====
First round
2	(Kazakhstan) Zarina Diyas	6	6
(Japan) Miharu Imanishi	1	4
WC	(Japan) Kyōka Okamura	6	6
9	(Slovakia) Kristína Kučová	2	1

Qualifying competition
2	(Kazakhstan) Zarina Diyas	6	6
WC	(Japan) Kyōka Okamura	1	2

==== Third qualifier ====
First round
3	(Australia) Astra Sharma	6	1^{r}
(Japan) Yuki Naito	1	4
(Japan) Risa Ozaki	2	3
11	(China) Han Xinyun	6	6

Qualifying competition
(Japan) Yuki Naito	3	6	1
11	(China) Han Xinyun	6	4	6

==== Fourth qualifier ====
First round
4	(United States) Whitney Osuigwe	6	5	6
(Canada) Leylah Annie Fernandez	4	7	2
(Japan) Ayano Shimizu	2	3
7	(United States) Nicole Gibbs	6	6

Qualifying competition
4	(United States) Whitney Osuigwe	4	3
7	(United States) Nicole Gibbs	6	6

==== Fifth qualifier ====
First round
5	(Poland) Katarzyna Kawa	6	2	6
(Japan) Mayo Hibi	4	6	4
WC	(Japan) Mai Hontama	3	7^{12}	3
10	(Russia) Varvara Flink	6	6^{10}	6

Qualifying competition
5	(Poland) Katarzyna Kawa	1	6^{3}
10	(Russia) Varvara Flink	6	7^{7}

==== Sixth qualifier ====
First round
6	(Russia) Liudmila Samsonova	2	6	7
WC	(Japan) Akiko Omae	6	4	5
(Bulgaria) Viktoriya Tomova	3	6	6
8	(United States) Francesca Di Lorenzo	6	3	1

Qualifying competition
6	(Russia) Liudmila Samsonova	6	0	4
(Bulgaria) Viktoriya Tomova	3	6	6
