= 2019 Silicon Valley Classic =

- Date: 29 July – 4 August
- Edition: 48th
- Category: WTA Premier
- Draw: 28S / 16D
- Prize money: $876,183
- Surface: Hard / outdoor
- Location: San Jose, California, United States
- Venue: San José State University Tennis Center

Champions

Singles
- (China) Zheng Saisai

Doubles
- (United States) Nicole Melichar / (Czech Republic) Květa Peschke
← 2018 ·	Silicon Valley Classic	· 2021 →

The 2019 Silicon Valley Classic (also known as the Mubadala Silicon Valley Classic for sponsorship reasons) was a professional tennis tournament played on hard courts. It was the 48th edition of the tournament, and part of the WTA Premier tournaments of the 2019 WTA Tour. It took place between 29 July and 4 August 2019 in San Jose, California. It was the first women's event on the 2019 US Open Series.

== Points and prize money ==
=== Point distribution ===
Event	W	F	SF	QF	Round of 16	Round of 32	Q	Q2	Q1
Women's singles	470	305	185	100	55	1	25	13	1
Women's doubles	470	305	185	100	1	—	—	—	—

=== Prize money ===
Event	W	F	SF	QF	Round of 16	Round of 32	Q2	Q1
Women's singles	$128,100	$68,280	$37,330	$21,330	$10,670	$6,990	$3,225	$1,810
Women's doubles	$40,300	$21,330	$11,735	$5,975	$3,240	—	—	—

== Singles main-draw entrants ==
=== Seeds ===
Country	Player	Rank^{1}	Seed
UKR	Elina Svitolina	7	1
BLR	Aryna Sabalenka	10	2
BEL	Elise Mertens	20	3
USA	Amanda Anisimova	23	4
CRO	Donna Vekić	26	5
ESP	Carla Suárez Navarro	29	6
GRE	Maria Sakkari	30	7
USA	Danielle Collins	33	8

- Rankings are as of July 22, 2019.

=== Other entrants ===
The following players received wildcards into the singles main draw:

- (Russia) Daria Kasatkina
- (United States) Bethanie Mattek-Sands
- (United States) CoCo Vandeweghe
- (United States) Venus Williams

The following players received entry from the qualifying draw:

- (United States) Kristie Ahn
- (Hungary) Tímea Babos
- (Japan) Mayo Hibi
- (France) Harmony Tan

=== Withdrawals ===
- (Croatia) Petra Martić → replaced by (Japan) Misaki Doi
- (Spain) Garbiñe Muguruza → replaced by (Czech Republic) Marie Bouzková
- (Latvia) Jeļena Ostapenko → replaced by (United Kingdom) Heather Watson
- (China) Wang Qiang → replaced by (United States) Madison Brengle

== Doubles main-draw entrants ==
=== Seeds ===
Country	Player	Country	Player	Rank^{1}	Seed
USA	Nicole Melichar	CZE	Květa Peschke	37	1
USA	Desirae Krawczyk	POL	Alicja Rosolska	78	2
UKR	Lyudmyla Kichenok	UKR	Nadiia Kichenok	81	3
ROU	Mihaela Buzărnescu	CHN	Zhang Shuai	90	4

- ^{1} Rankings are as of July 22, 2019.

== Finals ==
=== Singles ===
- (China) Zheng Saisai defeated (Belarus) Aryna Sabalenka, 6−3, 7−6^{(7−3)}

=== Doubles ===
- (United States) Nicole Melichar / (Czech Republic) Květa Peschke defeated (Japan) Shuko Aoyama / (Japan) Ena Shibahara, 6−4, 6−4
