= 2019 Volvo Car Open =

- Date: April 1–7
- Edition: 47th
- Category: WTA Premier
- Draw: 56S / 16D
- Prize money: $823,000
- Surface: Green clay / outdoor
- Location: Charleston, United States
- Venue: Family Circle Tennis Center

Champions

Singles
- (United States) Madison Keys

Doubles
- (Germany) Anna-Lena Grönefeld / (Poland) Alicja Rosolska
← 2018 ·	Charleston Open	· 2021 →

The 2019 Volvo Car Open was a women's tennis event on the 2019 WTA Tour. It took place between April 1 and April 7, 2019 and was the 47th edition of the Charleston Open tournament and a Premier level tournament. The event took place at the Family Circle Tennis Center, on Daniel Island, Charleston, United States. It was the only event of the clay court season played on green clay. Eighth-seeded Madison Keys won the singles title.

== Finals ==
=== Singles ===
- (United States) Madison Keys defeated (Denmark) Caroline Wozniacki, 7–6^{(7–5)}, 6–3

=== Doubles ===
- (Germany) Anna-Lena Grönefeld / (Poland) Alicja Rosolska defeated (Russia) Irina Khromacheva / (Russia) Veronika Kudermetova, 7–6^{(9–7)}, 6–2

== Points and prize money ==
=== Point distribution ===
Event	W	F	SF	QF	Round of 16	Round of 32	Round of 64	Q	Q2	Q1
Singles	470	305	185	100	55	30	1	25	13	1
Doubles	470	305	185	100	1	—	—	—	—	—

=== Prize money ===
Event	W	F	SF	QF	Round of 16	Round of 32	Round of 64	Q2	Q1
Singles	$141,420	$75,120	$37,020	$19,031	$9,860	$5,050	$2,595	$1,180	$710
Doubles	$44,200	$23,615	$12,905	$6,565	$3,570	—	—	—	—

== Singles main draw entrants ==
=== Seeds ===
Country	Player	Ranking^{1}	Seed
USA	Sloane Stephens	6	1
NED	Kiki Bertens	8	2
BLR	Aryna Sabalenka	9	3
LAT	Anastasija Sevastova	12	4
DEN	Caroline Wozniacki	13	5
BEL	Elise Mertens	14	6
GER	Julia Görges	15	7
USA	Madison Keys	16	8
SUI	Belinda Bencic	20	9
LAT	Jeļena Ostapenko	23	10
USA	Danielle Collins	26	11
ROU	Mihaela Buzărnescu	32	12
USA	Sofia Kenin	34	13
AUS	Ajla Tomljanović	40	14
GRE	Maria Sakkari	49	15
CRO	Petra Martić	52	16

- ^{1} Rankings as of March 18, 2019.

=== Other entrants ===
The following players received wildcards into the main draw:

- (Germany) Sabine Lisicki
- (United States) Emma Navarro
- (United States) Shelby Rogers

The following player received entry using a protected ranking into the main draw:

- (Germany) Anna-Lena Friedsam

The following players received entry from the qualifying draw:

- (Australia) Destanee Aiava
- (United States) Lauren Davis
- (United States) Francesca Di Lorenzo
- (Poland) Magdalena Fręch
- (Ukraine) Nadiia Kichenok
- (Ukraine) Kateryna Kozlova
- (Australia) Astra Sharma
- (Italy) Martina Trevisan

The following player received entry as a Lucky Loser:

- (Switzerland) Conny Perrin

=== Withdrawals ===
Before the tournament

- (Canada) Bianca Andreescu → replaced by (Russia) Irina Khromacheva
- (Australia) Ashleigh Barty → replaced by (United States) Varvara Lepchenko
- (Romania) Irina-Camelia Begu → replaced by (United States) Jessica Pegula
- (France) Alizé Cornet → replaced by (Switzerland) Conny Perrin
- (Australia) Daria Gavrilova → replaced by (Russia) Veronika Kudermetova
- (Italy) Camila Giorgi → replaced by (United States) Taylor Townsend
- (Chinese Taipei) Hsieh Su-wei → replaced by (Hungary) Fanny Stollár
- (Tunisia) Ons Jabeur → replaced by (United States) Madison Brengle
- (Serbia) Aleksandra Krunić → replaced by (Germany) Laura Siegemund
- (United States) Bernarda Pera → replaced by (Russia) Natalia Vikhlyantseva
- (Russia) Anastasia Potapova → replaced by (Czech Republic) Kristýna Plíšková
- (Kazakhstan) Yulia Putintseva → replaced by (Italy) Sara Errani
- (Ukraine) Lesia Tsurenko → replaced by (Belgium) Ysaline Bonaventure
- (China) Zheng Saisai → replaced by (Luxembourg) Mandy Minella

== Doubles main draw entrants ==
=== Seeds ===
Country	Player	Country	Player	Rank^{1}	Seed
USA	Nicole Melichar	CZE	Květa Peschke	23	1
CZE	Lucie Hradecká	SLO	Andreja Klepač	41	2
USA	Raquel Atawo	SLO	Katarina Srebotnik	51	3
GER	Anna-Lena Grönefeld	POL	Alicja Rosolska	56	4

- ^{1} Rankings as of March 18, 2019.

=== Other entrants ===
The following pairs received wildcards into the doubles main draw:

- (United States) Chloe Beck / (United States) Emma Navarro
- (Italy) Sara Errani / (Italy) Martina Trevisan
