= 2019 Porsche Tennis Grand Prix – Singles =

Singles
- 2019 Porsche Tennis Grand Prix

Final
- Champion: (Czech Republic) Petra Kvitová
- Runner-up: (Estonia) Anett Kontaveit
- Score: 6–3, 7–6^{(7–2)}

Details
- Draw: 28
- Seeds: 8

Events
Singles	Doubles
- Porsche Tennis Grand Prix

Karolína Plíšková was the defending champion, but lost in the second round to Victoria Azarenka.

Petra Kvitová won the title, defeating Anett Kontaveit in the final, 6–3, 7–6^{(7–2)}.

Naomi Osaka retained the WTA no. 1 singles ranking by reaching the quarterfinals. Kvitová was also in contention for the top ranking at the beginning of the tournament.

== Seeds ==
The top four seeds received a bye into the second round.

1. (Japan) Naomi Osaka (semifinals, withdrew due to abdominal injury)
2. (Romania) Simona Halep (withdrew)
3. (Czech Republic) Petra Kvitová (champion)
4. (Czech Republic) Karolína Plíšková (second round)
5. (Germany) Angelique Kerber (quarterfinals)
6. (Netherlands) Kiki Bertens (semifinals)
7. (Latvia) Anastasija Sevastova (quarterfinals)
8. (Estonia) Anett Kontaveit (final)

== Draw ==
Key

- Q = Qualifier
- WC = Wild card
- LL = Lucky loser
- Alt = Alternate
- ITF = ITF entry
- PR = Protected ranking
- SR = Special ranking
- SE = Special exempt
- JE = Junior exempt
- JR = Junior Accelerator Programme entrant
- CO = College Accelerator Programme entrant
- NG = Next Gen Accelerator Program entrant
- w/o = Walkover
- r = Retired
- d = Defaulted

=== Finals ===
Semifinals
1	(Japan) Naomi Osaka
8	(Estonia) Anett Kontaveit	w/o
3	(Czech Republic) Petra Kvitová	7^{7}	3	6
6	(Netherlands) Kiki Bertens	6^{3}	6	1

Final
8	(Estonia) Anett Kontaveit	3	6^{2}
3	(Czech Republic) Petra Kvitová	6	7^{7}

=== Top half ===
First round
(China) Q Wang	6	3	4
(Chinese Taipei) S-w Hsieh	4	6	6
(Belgium) E Mertens	6^{8}	5
(Russia) D Kasatkina	7^{10}	7
(Croatia) D Vekić	6	7
LL	(Italy) G Gatto-Monticone	1	5
LL	(Russia) V Zvonareva	5	4
(Belarus) V Azarenka	7	6
(Russia) A Pavlyuchenkova	4	6	4
(Germany) J Görges	6	2	0^{r}
(France) C Garcia	4	3
8	(Estonia) A Kontaveit	6	6

Second round
1	(Japan) N Osaka	6	6
(Chinese Taipei) S-w Hsieh	4	3
(Russia) D Kasatkina	1	5
(Croatia) D Vekić	6	7
4	(Czech Republic) Ka Plíšková	6	3	4
(Belarus) V Azarenka	4	6	6
(Russia) A Pavlyuchenkova	3	2
8	(Estonia) A Kontaveit	6	6

Quarterfinals
1	(Japan) N Osaka	6	4	7^{7}
(Croatia) D Vekić	3	6	6^{4}
(Belarus) V Azarenka	7	5	0^{r}
8	(Estonia) A Kontaveit	5	7	3

Semifinals
1	(Japan) N Osaka
8	(Estonia) A Kontaveit	w/o

=== Bottom half ===
First round
7	(Latvia) A Sevastova	6	4	6
(Latvia) J Ostapenko	2	6	0
(Ukraine) L Tsurenko	2	2
WC	(Germany) L Siegemund	6	6
Q	(Belgium) G Minnen	7	6
WC	(Slovakia) D Cibulková	5	3
6	(Netherlands) K Bertens	7	6
Q	(Germany) A-L Friedsam	5	2
Q	(Luxembourg) M Minella	2	4
(Switzerland) B Bencic	6	6
Q	(Spain) S Sorribes Tormo	3	4
WC	(Germany) A Petkovic	6	6

Second round
7	(Latvia) A Sevastova	6	6
WC	(Germany) L Siegemund	4	3
Q	(Belgium) G Minnen	1	4
3	(Czech Republic) P Kvitová	6	6
6	(Netherlands) K Bertens	4	6	6
(Switzerland) B Bencic	6	3	4
WC	(Germany) A Petkovic	2	4
5	(Germany) A Kerber	6	6

Quarterfinals
7	(Latvia) A Sevastova	6	2	3
3	(Czech Republic) P Kvitová	2	6	6
6	(Netherlands) K Bertens	6	6
5	(Germany) A Kerber	3	4

Semifinals
3	(Czech Republic) P Kvitová	7^{7}	3	6
6	(Netherlands) K Bertens	6^{3}	6	1

== Qualifying ==
=== Seeds ===
1. (Russia) Ekaterina Alexandrova (first round)
2. (Spain) Sara Sorribes Tormo (qualified)
3. (Russia) Vera Zvonareva (qualifying competition, lucky loser)
4. (Slovenia) Dalila Jakupović (first round)
5. (Luxembourg) Mandy Minella (qualified)
6. (United States) Bernarda Pera (second round)
7. (Russia) Anna Blinkova (second round)
8. (Czech Republic) Tereza Smitková (qualifying competition)

=== Qualifiers ===
1. (Germany) Anna-Lena Friedsam
2. (Spain) Sara Sorribes Tormo
3. (Luxembourg) Mandy Minella
4. (Belgium) Greet Minnen

=== Lucky losers ===
1. (Italy) Giulia Gatto-Monticone
2. (Russia) Vera Zvonareva

=== Draw ===
==== First qualifier ====
First round
1	(Russia) Ekaterina Alexandrova	5	2
WC	(Germany) Anna-Lena Friedsam	7	6
(Argentina) Paula Ormaechea	1	1
(Germany) Antonia Lottner	6	6
PR	(France) Océane Dodin	2	5
(France) Jessika Ponchet	6	7
(France) Chloé Paquet	1	3
8	(Czech Republic) Tereza Smitková	6	6

Second round
WC	(Germany) Anna-Lena Friedsam	6	3	7^{7}
(Germany) Antonia Lottner	2	6	6^{1}
(France) Jessika Ponchet	6^{6}	3
8	(Czech Republic) Tereza Smitková	7^{8}	6

Qualifying competition
WC	(Germany) Anna-Lena Friedsam	6	6
8	(Czech Republic) Tereza Smitková	4	4

==== Second qualifier ====
First round
2	(Spain) Sara Sorribes Tormo	6	6
(Germany) Tamara Korpatsch	3	4
(United States) Varvara Lepchenko	2	6^{4}
(Georgia (country)) Ekaterine Gorgodze	6	7^{7}
(Germany) Anna Zaja	7^{7}	7^{10}
(Greece) Valentini Grammatikopoulou	6^{3}	6^{8}
(Russia) Varvara Flink	7^{7}	1^{r}
6	(United States) Bernarda Pera	6^{2}	1

Second round
2	(Spain) Sara Sorribes Tormo	6	6
(Georgia (country)) Ekaterine Gorgodze	2	2
(Germany) Anna Zaja	6	7
6	(United States) Bernarda Pera	3	5

Qualifying competition
2	(Spain) Sara Sorribes Tormo	1	6	7^{7}
(Germany) Anna Zaja	6	1	6^{4}

==== Third qualifier ====
First round
3	(Russia) Vera Zvonareva	6	6
(Czech Republic) Anastasia Zarycká	4	4
WC	(Germany) Sabine Lisicki	6	3	6^{8}
(Bulgaria) Isabella Shinikova	3	6	7^{10}
(Ukraine) Katarina Zavatska	2	6	3
(Russia) Anna Kalinskaya	6	3	6
WC	(Germany) Lena Rüffer	0	3
5	(Luxembourg) Mandy Minella	6	6

Second round
3	(Russia) Vera Zvonareva	6	6
(Bulgaria) Isabella Shinikova	2	1
(Russia) Anna Kalinskaya	5	1
5	(Luxembourg) Mandy Minella	7	6

Qualifying competition
3	(Russia) Vera Zvonareva	3	7	2
5	(Luxembourg) Mandy Minella	6	5	6

==== Fourth qualifier ====
First round
4	(Slovenia) Dalila Jakupović	4	7^{7}	0
(Italy) Giulia Gatto-Monticone	6	6^{4}	6
WC	(Germany) Mina Hodzic	2	4
(Poland) Magdalena Fręch	6	6
(Russia) Liudmila Samsonova	4	5
(Belgium) Greet Minnen	6	7
(Czech Republic) Tereza Martincová	4	2
7	(Russia) Anna Blinkova	6	6

Second round
(Italy) Giulia Gatto-Monticone	6	6
(Poland) Magdalena Fręch	4	4
(Belgium) Greet Minnen	3	7	6
7	(Russia) Anna Blinkova	6	5	4

Qualifying competition
(Italy) Giulia Gatto-Monticone	1	7^{7}	2
(Belgium) Greet Minnen	6	6^{3}	6
