= 2019 Internationaux de Strasbourg – Singles =

Singles
- 2019 Internationaux de Strasbourg

Final
- Champion: (Ukraine) Dayana Yastremska
- Runner-up: (France) Caroline Garcia
- Score: 6–4, 5–7, 7–6^{(7–3)}

Events
Singles	Doubles
- Internationaux de Strasbourg

Anastasia Pavlyuchenkova was the defending champion, but withdrew before the tournament began.

Dayana Yastremska won the title, defeating Caroline Garcia in the final 6–4, 5–7, 7–6^{(7–3)}. Yastremska saved a match point Garcia had against her in the third set in the final before winning the title.

== Seeds ==
1. (Australia) Ashleigh Barty (withdrew)
2. (Belarus) Aryna Sabalenka (semifinals)
3. (China) Wang Qiang (second round)
4. (France) Caroline Garcia (final)
5. (United States) Sofia Kenin (first round)
6. (Ukraine) Dayana Yastremska (champion)
7. (China) Zheng Saisai (second round)
8. (China) Zhang Shuai (first round)

== Draw ==
Key

- Q = Qualifier
- WC = Wild card
- LL = Lucky loser
- Alt = Alternate
- ITF = ITF entry
- PR = Protected ranking
- SR = Special ranking
- SE = Special exempt
- JE = Junior exempt
- JR = Junior Accelerator Programme entrant
- CO = College Accelerator Programme entrant
- NG = Next Gen Accelerator Program entrant
- w/o = Walkover
- r = Retired
- d = Defaulted

=== Finals ===
Semifinals
(France) Chloé Paquet	3	4
4	(France) Caroline Garcia	6	6
6	(Ukraine) Dayana Yastremska	6	6
2/WC	(Belarus) Aryna Sabalenka	4	4

Final
4	(France) Caroline Garcia	4	7	6^{3}
6	(Ukraine) Dayana Yastremska	6	5	7^{7}

=== Top half ===
First round
LL	(Latvia) D Marcinkēviča	5	5
(Australia) D Gavrilova	7	7
WC	(France) A Hesse	6	6
(China) Y Wang	1	4
Q	(China) X Han	6	6
(Slovakia) AK Schmiedlová	0	2
(France) C Paquet	6	6
5	(United States) S Kenin	3	3
4	(France) C Garcia	4	6	6
PR	(United States) S Rogers	6	4	3
(Poland) M Linette	7^{7}	1	3
(Sweden) R Peterson	6^{0}	6	6
Q	(Belgium) M Benoît	4	1
Q	(Ukraine) M Kostyuk	6	6
WC	(France) H Tan	6^{4}	6^{5}
7	(China) S Zheng	7^{7}	7^{7}

Second round
(Australia) D Gavrilova	4	6	7
WC	(France) A Hesse	6	2	5
Q	(China) X Han	3	3
(France) C Paquet	6	6
4	(France) C Garcia	6	6
(Sweden) R Peterson	2	3
Q	(Ukraine) M Kostyuk	6	6
7	(China) S Zheng	3	1

Quarterfinals
(Australia) D Gavrilova	3	6^{1}
(France) C Paquet	6	7^{7}
4	(France) C Garcia	3	6	6
Q	(Ukraine) M Kostyuk	6	3	2

Semifinals
(France) C Paquet	3	4
4	(France) C Garcia	6	6

=== Bottom half ===
First round
6	(Ukraine) D Yastremska	6	6
(France) P Parmentier	2	4
(United States) J Pegula	3	1
(Australia) S Stosur	6	6
(France) F Ferro	6	6
(Thailand) L Kumkhum	3	1
(United States) J Brady	4	3
3	(China) Q Wang	6	6
8	(China) S Zhang	4	1
Q	(Australia) A Sharma	6	6
(Puerto Rico) M Puig	6	6
(Germany) T Maria	1	1
Q	(Germany) L Siegemund	6	7^{7}
Q	(Mexico) R Zarazúa	4	6^{5}
(China) L Zhu	0	1
2/WC	(Belarus) A Sabalenka	6	6

Second round
6	(Ukraine) D Yastremska	6	6
(Australia) S Stosur	0	2
(France) F Ferro	6^{4}	6	6
3	(China) Q Wang	7^{7}	3	3
Q	(Australia) A Sharma	3	2
(Puerto Rico) M Puig	6	6
Q	(Germany) L Siegemund	4	3
2/WC	(Belarus) A Sabalenka	6	6

Quarterfinals
6	(Ukraine) D Yastremska	6	6
(France) F Ferro	1	3
(Puerto Rico) M Puig	1	6	2
2/WC	(Belarus) A Sabalenka	6	3	6

Semifinals
6	(Ukraine) D Yastremska	6	6
2/WC	(Belarus) A Sabalenka	4	4

== Qualifying ==
=== Seeds ===
1. (Australia) Astra Sharma (qualified)
2. (Germany) Laura Siegemund (qualified)
3. (China) Han Xinyun (qualified)
4. (France) Jessika Ponchet (withdrew)
5. (China) Ma Shuyue (first round)
6. (Bulgaria) Sesil Karatantcheva (first round)
7. (Australia) Ellen Perez (first round)
8. (Romania) Alexandra Cadanțu (first round)
9. (United States) Jamie Loeb (first round)
10. (Romania) Jaqueline Cristian (qualifying competition)
11. (Latvia) Diāna Marcinkēviča (qualifying competition, lucky loser)
12. (Mexico) Renata Zarazúa (qualified)

=== Qualifiers ===
1. (Australia) Astra Sharma
2. (Germany) Laura Siegemund
3. (China) Han Xinyun
4. (Belgium) Marie Benoît
5. (Ukraine) Marta Kostyuk
6. (Mexico) Renata Zarazúa

=== Lucky loser ===
1. (Latvia) Diāna Marcinkēviča

=== Draw ===
==== First qualifier ====
First round
1	(Australia) Astra Sharma	6	6
(Hungary) Réka Luca Jani	2	1
(United States) Maria Sanchez	4	6	6
8	(Romania) Alexandra Cadanțu	6	0	3

Qualifying competition
1	(Australia) Astra Sharma	6	6
(United States) Maria Sanchez	3	2

==== Second qualifier ====
First round
2	(Germany) Laura Siegemund	6	6
(Venezuela) Andrea Gámiz	0	1
(Ukraine) Valeriya Strakhova	6	6
9	(United States) Jamie Loeb	1	1

Qualifying competition
2	(Germany) Laura Siegemund	1	6	6
(Ukraine) Valeriya Strakhova	6	1	0

==== Third qualifier ====
First round
3	(China) Han Xinyun	6	3	6
(Japan) Eri Hozumi	4	6	1
WC	(France) Audrey Albié	3	1
11	(Latvia) Diāna Marcinkēviča	6	6

Qualifying competition
3	(China) Han Xinyun	6	6
11	(Latvia) Diāna Marcinkēviča	2	2

==== Fourth qualifier ====
First round
WC	(France) Evita Ramirez	0	1
WC	(France) Émeline Dartron	6	6
(Belgium) Marie Benoît	6	6
7	(Australia) Ellen Perez	4	4

Qualifying competition
WC	(France) Émeline Dartron	2	6^{4}
(Belgium) Marie Benoît	6	7^{7}

==== Fifth qualifier ====
First round
5	(China) Ma Shuyue	5	2
(Ukraine) Marta Kostyuk	7	6
(Australia) Abbie Myers	6^{7}	6	3
10	(Romania) Jaqueline Cristian	7^{9}	4	6

Qualifying competition
(Ukraine) Marta Kostyuk	6	6
10	(Romania) Jaqueline Cristian	1	2

==== Sixth qualifier ====
First round
6	(Bulgaria) Sesil Karatantcheva	4	7	4
WC	(France) Diane Parry	6	5	6
(Poland) Katarzyna Piter	5	1
12	(Mexico) Renata Zarazúa	7	6

Qualifying competition
WC	(France) Diane Parry	2	6	2
12	(Mexico) Renata Zarazúa	6	3	6
