= 2019 Wuhan Open =

- Date: September 22–28
- Edition: 6th
- Category: WTA Premier 5
- Draw: 56S / 28D
- Prize money: $2,828,000
- Surface: Hard / outdoor
- Location: Wuhan, China
- Venue: Optics Valley Int'l Tennis Center

Champions

Singles
- (Belarus) Aryna Sabalenka

Doubles
- (China) Duan Yingying / (Russia) Veronika Kudermetova
← 2018 ·	Wuhan Open	· 2024 →

The 2019 Wuhan Open (also known as the 2019 Dongfeng Motor Wuhan Open for sponsorship reasons) was a women's tennis tournament played on outdoor hard courts between September 22–28, 2019. It was the 6th edition of the Wuhan Open, and part of the WTA Premier 5 tournaments of the 2019 WTA Tour. The tournament was held at the Optics Valley International Tennis Center in Wuhan, China.

== Points and prize money ==
=== Point distribution ===
Event	W	F	SF	QF	Round of 16	Round of 32	Round of 64	Q	Q2	Q1
Singles	900	585	350	190	105	60	1	30	20	1
Doubles	900	585	350	190	105	1	—	—	—	—

=== Prize money ===
Event	W	F	SF	QF	Round of 16	Round of 32	Round of 64	Q2	Q1
Singles	$520,615	$260,310	$130,030	$59,960	$29,695	$15,240	$7,835	$4,360	$2,245
Doubles	$148,845	$75,310	$37,275	$18,765	$9,510	$4,695	—	—	—

== Singles main-draw entrants ==
=== Seeds ===
Country	Player	Rank^{1}	Seed
AUS	Ashleigh Barty	1	1
CZE	Karolína Plíšková	2	2
UKR	Elina Svitolina	3	3
ROU	Simona Halep	6	4
CZE	Petra Kvitová	7	5
NED	Kiki Bertens	8	6
SUI	Belinda Bencic	10	7
CHN	Wang Qiang	12	8
BLR	Aryna Sabalenka	13	9
USA	Sloane Stephens	14	10
GER	Angelique Kerber	15	11
~~USA~~	~~Madison Keys~~	~~16~~	~~12~~
DEN	Caroline Wozniacki	17	13
LAT	Anastasija Sevastova	18	14
USA	Sofia Kenin	20	15
CRO	Donna Vekić	21	16

- Rankings are as of September 16, 2019

=== Other entrants ===
The following players received wild cards into the singles main draw:

- (China) Peng Shuai
- (Kazakhstan) Elena Rybakina
- (Australia) Samantha Stosur
- (China) Wang Xiyu
- (United States) Venus Williams

The following players received entry from the singles qualifying draw:

- (United States) Jennifer Brady
- (United States) Lauren Davis
- (Ukraine) Kateryna Kozlova
- (Russia) Veronika Kudermetova
- (Russia) Svetlana Kuznetsova
- (United States) Christina McHale
- (United States) Bernarda Pera
- (China) Zhu Lin

The following players received entry as lucky losers:

- (Tunisia) Ons Jabeur
- (Sweden) Rebecca Peterson
- (Slovenia) Tamara Zidanšek

=== Withdrawals ===
Before the tournament

- (Canada) Bianca Andreescu → replaced by (Slovenia) Tamara Zidanšek
- (Belarus) Victoria Azarenka → replaced by (Tunisia) Ons Jabeur
- (Germany) Julia Görges → replaced by (France) Kristina Mladenovic
- (United States) Madison Keys → replaced by (Sweden) Rebecca Peterson
- (Estonia) Anett Kontaveit → replaced by (Italy) Camila Giorgi
- (Greece) Maria Sakkari → replaced by (Czech Republic) Marie Bouzková
- (Spain) Carla Suárez Navarro → replaced by (Belarus) Aliaksandra Sasnovich
- (Ukraine) Lesia Tsurenko → replaced by (United States) Jessica Pegula
- (Czech Republic) Markéta Vondroušová → replaced by (China) Wang Yafan
- (China) Zheng Saisai → replaced by (Slovenia) Polona Hercog

=== Retirements ===
- (United States) Lauren Davis (lower back injury)
- (Italy) Camila Giorgi (right wrist injury)
- (Romania) Simona Halep (lower back injury)
- (Kazakhstan) Yulia Putintseva (left ankle injury)

== Doubles main-draw entrants ==
=== Seeds ===
Country	Player	Country	Player	Rank^{1}	Seed
TPE	Hsieh Su-wei	CZE	Barbora Strýcová	6	1
BEL	Elise Mertens	BLR	Aryna Sabalenka	8	2
CAN	Gabriela Dabrowski	CHN	Xu Yifan	16	3
GER	Anna-Lena Grönefeld	NED	Demi Schuurs	24	4
AUS	Samantha Stosur	CHN	Zhang Shuai	28	5
TPE	Chan Hao-ching	TPE	Latisha Chan	32	6
USA	Nicole Melichar	CZE	Květa Peschke	36	7
CHN	Duan Yingying	RUS	Veronika Kudermetova	54	8

- Rankings are as of September 16, 2019

=== Other entrants ===
The following pairs received wildcards into the doubles main draw:

- (Netherlands) Kiki Bertens / (Netherlands) Lesley Pattinama Kerkhove
- (France) Caroline Garcia / (United States) Bethanie Mattek-Sands
- (China) Tang Qianhui / (China) Wang Xinyu

=== Withdrawals ===
During the tournament

- (Romania) Simona Halep (lower back injury)

== Champions ==
=== Singles ===
- (Belarus) Aryna Sabalenka def. (United States) Alison Riske, 6–3, 3–6, 6–1

=== Doubles ===
- (China) Duan Yingying / (Russia) Veronika Kudermetova def. (Belgium) Elise Mertens / (Belarus) Aryna Sabalenka, 7–6^{(7–3)}, 6–2
