= 2019 Volvo Car Open – Singles =

Singles
- 2019 Volvo Car Open

Final
- Champion: (United States) Madison Keys
- Runner-up: (Denmark) Caroline Wozniacki
- Score: 7–6^{(7–5)}, 6–3

Details
- Draw: 56
- Seeds: 16

Events
Singles	Doubles
- Charleston Open

Madison Keys won the title, defeating Caroline Wozniacki in the final, 7–6^{(7–5)}, 6–3. This was the final WTA tour singles final Wozniacki participated in before her first retirement in January 2020.

Kiki Bertens was the defending champion, but lost in the third round to Maria Sakkari.

== Seeds ==
The top eight seeds received a bye into the second round.

1. (United States) Sloane Stephens (quarterfinals)
2. (Netherlands) Kiki Bertens (third round)
3. (Belarus) Aryna Sabalenka (third round)
4. (Latvia) Anastasija Sevastova (second round)
5. (Denmark) Caroline Wozniacki (final)
6. (Belgium) Elise Mertens (second round)
7. (Germany) Julia Görges (second round)
8. (United States) Madison Keys (champion)

9. (Switzerland) Belinda Bencic (quarterfinals)
10. (Latvia) Jeļena Ostapenko (third round)
11. (United States) Danielle Collins (quarterfinals)
12. (Romania) Mihaela Buzărnescu (third round)
13. (United States) Sofia Kenin (second round)
14. (Australia) Ajla Tomljanović (third round)
15. (Greece) Maria Sakkari (quarterfinals)
16. (Croatia) Petra Martić (semifinals)

Click on the seed number of a player to go to their draw section.

== Draw ==
Key

- Q = Qualifier
- WC = Wild card
- LL = Lucky loser
- Alt = Alternate
- ITF = ITF entry
- PR = Protected ranking
- SR = Special ranking
- SE = Special exempt
- JE = Junior exempt
- JR = Junior Accelerator Programme entrant
- CO = College Accelerator Programme entrant
- NG = Next Gen Accelerator Program entrant
- w/o = Walkover
- r = Retired
- d = Defaulted

=== Finals ===
Quarterfinals
1	(United States) Sloane Stephens	6^{6}	6	2
8	(United States) Madison Keys	7^{8}	4	6
(Puerto Rico) Monica Puig	6	6
11	(United States) Danielle Collins	3	2
9	(Switzerland) Belinda Bencic	3	4
16	(Croatia) Petra Martić	6	6
5	(Denmark) Caroline Wozniacki	6	6
15	(Greece) Maria Sakkari	2	2

Semifinals
8	(United States) Madison Keys	6	6
(Puerto Rico) Monica Puig	4	0
16	(Croatia) Petra Martić	3	4
5	(Denmark) Caroline Wozniacki	6	6

Final
8	(United States) Madison Keys	7^{7}	6
5	(Denmark) Caroline Wozniacki	6^{5}	3

=== Top half ===
==== Section 1 ====
First round
(Spain) S Sorribes Tormo	6	6
(Hungary) F Stollár	0	3
PR	(Germany) A-L Friedsam	6	2	0
(Slovenia) T Zidanšek	1	6	6
(Poland) M Linette	2	6^{7}
14	(Australia) A Tomljanović	6	7^{9}
10	(Latvia) J Ostapenko	6	6
(Sweden) J Larsson	1	4
WC	(United States) S Rogers	6	6
(Russia) E Rodina	4	2
(Russia) N Vikhlyantseva	2	5
(Germany) T Maria	6	7

Second round
1	(United States) S Stephens	7^{7}	7^{7}
(Spain) S Sorribes Tormo	6^{4}	6^{4}
(Slovenia) T Zidanšek	5	2
14	(Australia) A Tomljanović	7	6
10	(Latvia) J Ostapenko	4	6	7^{7}
WC	(United States) S Rogers	6	3	6^{4}
(Germany) T Maria	6^{5}	6	4
8	(United States) M Keys	7^{7}	4	6

Third round
1	(United States) S Stephens	4	6	6
14	(Australia) A Tomljanović	6	4	4
10	(Latvia) J Ostapenko	5	2
8	(United States) M Keys	7	6

Quarterfinals
1	(United States) S Stephens	6^{6}	6	2
8	(United States) M Keys	7^{8}	4	6

==== Section 2 ====
First round
Q	(Ukraine) K Kozlova	7	6
(Czech Republic) Kr Plíšková	5	4
(Italy) S Errani	0	1
(Puerto Rico) M Puig	6	6
WC	(Germany) S Lisicki	5	4
13	(United States) S Kenin	7	6
11	(United States) D Collins	6	6
(United States) M Brengle	1	3
Q	(United States) F Di Lorenzo	3	5
(Spain) A Bolsova Zadoinov	6	7
(Russia) V Kudermetova	6^{4}	3
(Estonia) K Kanepi	7^{7}	6

Second round
3	(Belarus) A Sabalenka	3	6	6
Q	(Ukraine) K Kozlova	6	3	3
(Puerto Rico) M Puig	6	6
13	(United States) S Kenin	4	4
11	(United States) D Collins	6	7^{7}
(Spain) A Bolsova Zadoinov	3	6^{2}
(Estonia) K Kanepi	0	6	7
6	(Belgium) E Mertens	6	0	5

Third round
3	(Belarus) A Sabalenka	2	5
(Puerto Rico) M Puig	6	7
11	(United States) D Collins	7^{7}	6
(Estonia) K Kanepi	6^{1}	1

Quarterfinals
(Puerto Rico) M Puig	6	6
11	(United States) D Collins	3	2

=== Bottom half ===
==== Section 3 ====
First round
Q	(Australia) A Sharma	6	2	3
(United States) T Townsend	3	6	6
(France) P Parmentier	3	0
(United States) A Kiick	6	6
Q	(Australia) D Aiava	3	0
9	(Switzerland) B Bencic	6	6
16	(Croatia) P Martić	6	2	6
(United States) A Anisimova	4	6	1
(Luxembourg) M Minella	3	7	6
(Slovakia) AK Schmiedlová	6	5	0
(United States) J Pegula	1	7^{7}	6
(Russia) I Khromacheva	6	6^{4}	1

Second round
7	(Germany) J Görges	4	6^{0}
(United States) T Townsend	6	7^{7}
(United States) A Kiick	0	3
9	(Switzerland) B Bencic	6	6
16	(Croatia) P Martić	6	6
(Luxembourg) M Minella	3	3
(United States) J Pegula	6	6
4	(Latvia) A Sevastova	4	2

Third round
(United States) T Townsend	2	5
9	(Switzerland) B Bencic	6	7
16	(Croatia) P Martić	2	6	6
(United States) J Pegula	6	3	2

Quarterfinals
9	(Switzerland) B Bencic	3	4
16	(Croatia) P Martić	6	6

==== Section 4 ====
First round
(Germany) L Siegemund	7	6
WC	(United States) E Navarro	5	4
(Belgium) Y Bonaventure	4	6	2
Q	(United States) L Davis	6	0	6
Q	(Poland) M Fręch	1	6	5
12	(Romania) M Buzărnescu	6	4	7
15	(Greece) M Sakkari	7	3	6
LL	(Switzerland) C Perrin	5	6	1
(United States) V Lepchenko	0	4
(Germany) A Petkovic	6	6
Q	(Italy) M Trevisan	6	6
Q	(Ukraine) N Kichenok	2	1

Second round
5	(Denmark) C Wozniacki	6	6
(Germany) L Siegemund	2	2
Q	(United States) L Davis	3	2
12	(Romania) M Buzărnescu	6	6
15	(Greece) M Sakkari	6	6
(Germany) A Petkovic	3	0
Q	(Italy) M Trevisan	2	1
2	(Netherlands) K Bertens	6	6

Third round
5	(Denmark) C Wozniacki	6	3	6
12	(Romania) M Buzărnescu	4	6	3
15	(Greece) M Sakkari	7^{10}	6
2	(Netherlands) K Bertens	6^{8}	3

Quarterfinals
5	(Denmark) C Wozniacki	6	6
15	(Greece) M Sakkari	2	2

== Qualifying ==
=== Seeds ===
1. (Ukraine) Kateryna Kozlova (qualified)
2. (Australia) Astra Sharma (qualified)
3. (Switzerland) Conny Perrin (qualifying competition, lucky loser)
4. (Russia) Varvara Flink (qualifying competition, withdrew)
5. (Czech Republic) Tereza Martincová (qualifying competition)
6. (United States) Caroline Dolehide (qualifying competition)
7. (Netherlands) Bibiane Schoofs (first round)
8. (Italy) Martina Trevisan (qualified)
9. (Poland) Magdalena Fręch (qualified)
10. (United States) Francesca Di Lorenzo (qualified)
11. (Russia) Sofya Zhuk (first round)
12. (United States) Lauren Davis (qualified)
13. (Spain) Sílvia Soler Espinosa (first round)
14. (Germany) Anna Zaja (first round)
15. (Bulgaria) Sesil Karatantcheva (qualifying competition)
16. (Australia) Destanee Aiava (qualified)

=== Qualifiers ===
1. (Ukraine) Kateryna Kozlova
2. (Australia) Astra Sharma
3. (Poland) Magdalena Fręch
4. (United States) Lauren Davis
5. (Australia) Destanee Aiava
6. (Ukraine) Nadiia Kichenok
7. (United States) Francesca Di Lorenzo
8. (Italy) Martina Trevisan

=== Lucky loser ===
1. (Switzerland) Conny Perrin

=== Draw ===
==== First qualifier ====
First round
1	(Ukraine) Kateryna Kozlova	6	6
WC	(Germany) Jasmin Jebawy	1	1
(United States) Nicole Melichar	6^{4}	7^{7}	6
13	(Spain) Sílvia Soler Espinosa	7^{7}	6^{4}	3

Qualifying competition
1	(Ukraine) Kateryna Kozlova	6	6
(United States) Nicole Melichar	1	3

==== Second qualifier ====
First round
2	(Australia) Astra Sharma	6	6
(Slovenia) Andreja Klepač	2	2
(Japan) Shuko Aoyama	7^{7}	6
14	(Germany) Anna Zaja	6^{2}	4

Qualifying competition
2	(Australia) Astra Sharma	6	3	6
(Japan) Shuko Aoyama	4	6	1

==== Third qualifier ====
First round
3	(Switzerland) Conny Perrin	6	6
WC	(United States) Kennedy Shaffer	0	1
(Norway) Ulrikke Eikeri	6	2	1
9	(Poland) Magdalena Fręch	3	6	6

Qualifying competition
3	(Switzerland) Conny Perrin	4	1
9	(Poland) Magdalena Fręch	6	6

==== Fourth qualifier ====
First round
4	(Russia) Varvara Flink	6	7^{7}
(Poland) Alicja Rosolska	2	6^{4}
(Ukraine) Lyudmyla Kichenok	6^{2}	0
12	(United States) Lauren Davis	7^{7}	6

Qualifying competition
4	(Russia) Varvara Flink
12	(United States) Lauren Davis	w/o

==== Fifth qualifier ====
First round
5	(Czech Republic) Tereza Martincová	6	7
(Czech Republic) Lucie Hradecká	0	5
(United States) Abigail Spears	2	6	3
16	(Australia) Destanee Aiava	6	1	6

Qualifying competition
5	(Czech Republic) Tereza Martincová	3	1
16	(Australia) Destanee Aiava	6	6

==== Sixth qualifier ====
First round
6	(United States) Caroline Dolehide	6	6
(Belarus) Lidziya Marozava	2	3
(Ukraine) Nadiia Kichenok	7^{7}	6
11	(Russia) Sofya Zhuk	6^{3}	3

Qualifying competition
6	(United States) Caroline Dolehide	6^{3}	6	6^{10}
(Ukraine) Nadiia Kichenok	7^{7}	4	7^{12}

==== Seventh qualifier ====
First round
7	(Netherlands) Bibiane Schoofs	5	7^{7}	3
(United States) Kayla Day	7	6^{1}	6
WC	(United States) Jessica Ho	3	3
10	(United States) Francesca Di Lorenzo	6	6

Qualifying competition
(United States) Kayla Day	4	4
10	(United States) Francesca Di Lorenzo	6	6

==== Eighth qualifier ====
First round
8	(Italy) Martina Trevisan	6	7
(United States) Caty McNally	3	5
(Croatia) Darija Jurak	2	2
15	(Bulgaria) Sesil Karatantcheva	6	6

Qualifying competition
8	(Italy) Martina Trevisan	6	6
15	(Bulgaria) Sesil Karatantcheva	2	3
