= 2019 Silicon Valley Classic – Singles =

Singles
- 2019 Silicon Valley Classic

Final
- Champion: (China) Zheng Saisai
- Runner-up: (Belarus) Aryna Sabalenka
- Score: 6–3, 7–6^{(7–3)}

Details
- Draw: 28
- Seeds: 8

Events
| Singles | Doubles |
- Silicon Valley Classic

Mihaela Buzărnescu was the defending champion, but lost to Daria Kasatkina in the first round.

Zheng Saisai won her first WTA singles title, defeating Aryna Sabalenka in the final, 6–3, 7–6^{(7–3)}.

== Seeds ==
The top four seeds received a bye into the second round.

1. (Ukraine) Elina Svitolina (quarterfinals)
2. (Belarus) Aryna Sabalenka (final)
3. (Belgium) Elise Mertens (second round)
4. (United States) Amanda Anisimova (quarterfinals)
5. (Croatia) Donna Vekić (semifinals)
6. (Spain) Carla Suárez Navarro (quarterfinals)
7. (Greece) Maria Sakkari (semifinals)
8. (United States) Danielle Collins (second round)

== Draw ==
Key

- Q = Qualifier
- WC = Wild card
- LL = Lucky loser
- Alt = Alternate
- ITF = ITF entry
- PR = Protected ranking
- SR = Special ranking
- SE = Special exempt
- JE = Junior exempt
- JR = Junior Accelerator Programme entrant
- CO = College Accelerator Programme entrant
- NG = Next Gen Accelerator Program entrant
- w/o = Walkover
- r = Retired
- d = Defaulted

=== Finals ===
Semifinals
7 | (Greece) Maria Sakkari | 6^{5} | 2
(China) Zheng Saisai | 7^{7} | 6
5 | (Croatia) Donna Vekić | 4 | 3
2 | (Belarus) Aryna Sabalenka | 6 | 6

Final
(China) Zheng Saisai | 6 | 7^{7}
2 | (Belarus) Aryna Sabalenka | 3 | 6^{3}

=== Top half ===
First round
(Romania) M Buzărnescu | 2 | 2
WC | (Russia) D Kasatkina | 6 | 6
Q | (Hungary) T Babos | 2 | 6 | 6^{3}
Q | (Japan) M Hibi | 6 | 3 | 7^{7}
(Russia) E Alexandrova | 1 | 4
7 | (Greece) M Sakkari | 6 | 6
(United States) M Brengle | 6 | 6
(Germany) A Petkovic | 0 | 3
(United Kingdom) H Watson | 3 | 1
(China) S Zheng | 6 | 6
(China) S Zhang | 4 | 7 | 2
8 | (United States) D Collins | 6 | 5 | 6

Second round
1 | (Ukraine) E Svitolina | 6 | 6
WC | (Russia) D Kasatkina | 3 | 1
Q | (Japan) M Hibi | 6 | 4 | 2
7 | (Greece) M Sakkari | 4 | 6 | 6
4 | (United States) A Anisimova | 6 | 6
(United States) M Brengle | 2 | 2
(China) S Zheng | 6 | 6
8 | (United States) D Collins | 2 | 0

Quarterfinals
1 | (Ukraine) E Svitolina | 6 | 6^{3} | 3
7 | (Greece) M Sakkari | 1 | 7^{7} | 6
4 | (United States) A Anisimova | 7 | 5 | 4
(China) S Zheng | 5 | 7 | 6

Semifinals
7 | (Greece) M Sakkari | 6^{5} | 2
(China) S Zheng | 7^{7} | 6

=== Bottom half ===
First round
5 | (Croatia) D Vekić | 6 | 3 | 6
(Japan) M Doi | 4 | 6 | 4
Q | (France) H Tan | 2 | 4
(Belarus) V Azarenka | 6 | 6
(Australia) A Tomljanović | 3 | 6 | 4
Q | (United States) K Ahn | 6 | 4 | 6
6 | (Spain) C Suárez Navarro | 6 | 6
(Poland) M Linette | 3 | 3
WC | (United States) V Williams | 7^{7} | 3 | 1
WC | (United States) B Mattek-Sands | 6^{4} | 6 | 6
(Czech Republic) M Bouzková | 2 | 4
WC | (United States) C Vandeweghe | 6 | 6

Second round
5 | (Croatia) D Vekić | 6 | 6
(Belarus) V Azarenka | 4 | 3
Q | (United States) K Ahn | 6 | 6
3 | (Belgium) E Mertens | 3 | 3
6 | (Spain) C Suárez Navarro | 3 | 6 | 6
WC | (United States) B Mattek-Sands | 6 | 1 | 2
WC | (United States) C Vandeweghe | 3 | 3
2 | (Belarus) A Sabalenka | 6 | 6

Quarterfinals
5 | (Croatia) D Vekić | 7 | 6
Q | (United States) K Ahn | 5 | 0
6 | (Spain) C Suárez Navarro | 6 | 2 | 4
2 | (Belarus) A Sabalenka | 3 | 6 | 6

Semifinals
5 | (Croatia) D Vekić | 4 | 3
2 | (Belarus) A Sabalenka | 6 | 6

== Qualifying ==
=== Seeds ===
1. (Hungary) Tímea Babos (qualified)
2. (China) Wang Xiyu (qualifying competition)
3. (Australia) Priscilla Hon (qualifying competition)
4. (United States) Danielle Lao (qualifying competition)
5. (United States) Kristie Ahn (qualified)
6. (Chinese Taipei) Liang En-shuo (qualifying competition, retired)
7. (Serbia) Jovana Jakšić (first round)
8. (France) Harmony Tan (qualified)

=== Qualifiers ===
1. (Hungary) Tímea Babos
2. (Japan) Mayo Hibi
3. (France) Harmony Tan
4. (United States) Kristie Ahn

=== Qualifying draw ===
==== First qualifier ====
First round
1 | (Hungary) Tímea Babos | 7 | 2 | 7
WC | (United States) Katrina Scott | 5 | 6 | 5
(Ukraine) Nadiia Kichenok | 1 | 6^{4}
6 | (Chinese Taipei) Liang En-shuo | 6 | 7^{7}

Qualifying competition
1 | (Hungary) Tímea Babos | 5
6 | (Chinese Taipei) Liang En-shuo | 2^{r}

==== Second qualifier ====
First round
2 | (China) Wang Xiyu | 6 | 6
(United States) Ashley Kratzer | 3 | 1
(Japan) Mayo Hibi | 6 | 6
7 | (Serbia) Jovana Jakšić | 1 | 0

Qualifying competition
2 | (China) Wang Xiyu | 6 | 6^{5} | 2
(Japan) Mayo Hibi | 3 | 7^{7} | 6

==== Third qualifier ====
First round
3 | (Australia) Priscilla Hon | 6 | 6
(Japan) Shuko Aoyama | 4 | 3
(Japan) Eri Hozumi | 2 | 3
8 | (France) Harmony Tan | 6 | 6

Qualifying competition
3 | (Australia) Priscilla Hon | 7 | 3 | 1
8 | (France) Harmony Tan | 5 | 6 | 6

==== Fourth qualifier ====
First round
4 | (United States) Danielle Lao | 3 | 6 | 6
(Japan) Mai Hontama | 6 | 4 | 3
WC | (United States) Katie Volynets | 5 | 0
5 | (United States) Kristie Ahn | 7 | 6

Qualifying competition
4 | (United States) Danielle Lao | 1 | 4
5 | (United States) Kristie Ahn | 6 | 6
