= 2019 Mallorca Open – Singles =

Tennis tournament - women's singles

Singles
- 2019 Mallorca Open

Final
- Champion: (United States) Sofia Kenin
- Runner-up: (Switzerland) Belinda Bencic
- Score: 6–7^{(2–7)}, 7–6^{(7–5)}, 6–4

Details
- Draw: 32
- Seeds: 8

Events
Singles	Doubles
← 2018 ·	Mallorca Open

Sofia Kenin won the title, defeating Belinda Bencic in the final, 6–7^{(2–7)}, 7–6^{(7–5)}, 6–4, after saving three championship points in the second set.

Tatjana Maria was the defending champion, but chose not to participate this year.

== Seeds ==
1. (Germany) Angelique Kerber (semifinals)
2. (Latvia) Anastasija Sevastova (semifinals)
3. (Switzerland) Belinda Bencic (final)
4. (Belgium) Elise Mertens (quarterfinals)
5. (United States) Amanda Anisimova (quarterfinals)
6. (France) Caroline Garcia (quarterfinals)
7. (United States) Sofia Kenin (champion)
8. (Czech Republic) Kateřina Siniaková (first round)

== Draw ==
=== Key ===
- Q = Qualifier
- WC = Wild card
- LL = Lucky loser
- Alt = Alternate
- SE = Special exempt
- PR = Protected ranking
- ITF = ITF entry
- JE = Junior exempt
- w/o = Walkover
- r = Retired
- d = Defaulted
- SR = Special ranking

=== Finals ===
Semifinals
1	(Germany) Angelique Kerber	6	6^{2}	4
3	(Switzerland) Belinda Bencic	2	7^{7}	6
7	(United States) Sofia Kenin	6	4	6
2	(Latvia) Anastasija Sevastova	4	6	2

Final
3	(Switzerland) Belinda Bencic	7^{7}	6^{5}	4
7	(United States) Sofia Kenin	6^{2}	7^{7}	6

=== Top half ===
First round
1	(Germany) A Kerber	7	4	6
Q	(Belgium) Y Bonaventure	5	6	2
(Slovakia) V Kužmová	6^{8}	0
WC	(Russia) M Sharapova	7^{10}	6
WC	(Spain) P Badosa	6^{2}	7	7
(United States) A Riske	7^{7}	5	5
(Belarus) V Azarenka	6	4	5
6	(France) C Garcia	1	6	7
3	(Switzerland) B Bencic	7	6
(Sweden) R Peterson	5	4
Q	(United States) S Rogers	6	6
(China) S Zhang	2	2
(France) A Cornet	6	6
Q	(Spain) S Sorribes Tormo	0	1
Q	(Czech Republic) T Martincová	6	6^{7}	4
5	(United States) A Anisimova	3	7^{9}	6

Second round
1	(Germany) A Kerber	6	6
WC	(Russia) M Sharapova	2	3
WC	(Spain) P Badosa	2	7^{7}	3
6	(France) C Garcia	6	6^{1}	6
3	(Switzerland) B Bencic	5	6	3
Q	(United States) S Rogers	7	3	1^{r}
(France) A Cornet	2	4
5	(United States) A Anisimova	6	6

Quarterfinals
1	(Germany) A Kerber	6	7^{7}
6	(France) C Garcia	3	6^{5}
3	(Switzerland) B Bencic	6	6
5	(United States) A Anisimova	2	2

Semifinals
1	(Germany) A Kerber	6	6^{2}	4
3	(Switzerland) B Bencic	2	7^{7}	6

=== Bottom half ===
First round
7	(United States) S Kenin	6	6
(Belgium) K Flipkens	2	3
Q	(Slovenia) K Juvan	5	6^{5}
(Tunisia) O Jabeur	7	7^{7}
(China) S Zheng	4	5
WC	(Australia) S Stosur	6	7
WC	(Germany) A Petkovic	2	2
4	(Belgium) E Mertens	6	6
8	(Czech Republic) K Siniaková	2	6	3
(Belgium) A Van Uytvanck	6	3	6
PR	(Germany) A-L Friedsam	5	3
(China) Y Wang	7	6
(Puerto Rico) M Puig	4	5
(Australia) A Tomljanović	6	7
Q	(United States) V Lepchenko	3	6^{5}
2	(Latvia) A Sevastova	6	7^{7}

Second round
7	(United States) S Kenin	6	2
(Tunisia) O Jabeur	2	0^{r}
WC	(Australia) S Stosur	3	3
4	(Belgium) E Mertens	6	6
(Belgium) A Van Uytvanck	6^{3}	3
(China) Y Wang	7^{7}	6
(Australia) A Tomljanović	2	1
2	(Latvia) A Sevastova	6	6

Quarterfinals
7	(United States) S Kenin	1	6	6
4	(Belgium) E Mertens	6	1	3
(China) Y Wang	2	1
2	(Latvia) A Sevastova	6	6

Semifinals
7	(United States) S Kenin	6	4	6
2	(Latvia) A Sevastova	4	6	2

== Qualifying ==
=== Seeds ===
1. (Spain) Sara Sorribes Tormo (qualified)
2. (Serbia) Aleksandra Krunić (withdrew, still competing in Rosmalen)
3. (Germany) Mona Barthel (first round)
4. (Spain) Aliona Bolsova (qualifying competition)
5. (Switzerland) Jil Teichmann (qualifying competition)
6. (France) Fiona Ferro (qualifying competition)
7. (United States) Christina McHale (first round)
8. (Belgium) Ysaline Bonaventure (qualified)
9. (Slovenia) Kaja Juvan (qualified)
10. (United States) Varvara Lepchenko (qualified)
11. (Australia) Priscilla Hon (first round)
12. (Netherlands) Arantxa Rus (first round)

=== Qualifiers ===
1. (Spain) Sara Sorribes Tormo
2. (United States) Varvara Lepchenko
3. (Slovenia) Kaja Juvan
4. (Czech Republic) Tereza Martincová
5. (Belgium) Ysaline Bonaventure
6. (United States) Shelby Rogers

=== Draw ===
==== First qualifier ====
First round
1	(Spain) Sara Sorribes Tormo	6	1	6
(Germany) Antonia Lottner	2	6	1
(Sweden) Johanna Larsson	4	6	6
11	(Australia) Priscilla Hon	6	3	4

Qualifying competition
1	(Spain) Sara Sorribes Tormo	6	6
(Sweden) Johanna Larsson	1	0

==== Second qualifier ====
First round
Alt	(Japan) Kurumi Nara	6	7
WC	(Spain) Rosa Vicens Mas	3	5
(Romania) Irina Bara	6	1	2
10	(United States) Varvara Lepchenko	2	6	6

Qualifying competition
Alt	(Japan) Kurumi Nara	4	6	0
10	(United States) Varvara Lepchenko	6	2	6

==== Third qualifier ====
First round
3	(Germany) Mona Barthel	2	7^{7}	2
WC	(Germany) Sabine Lisicki	6	6^{2}	6
(Belgium) Greet Minnen	1	5
9	(Slovenia) Kaja Juvan	6	7

Qualifying competition
WC	(Germany) Sabine Lisicki	7	4	4
9	(Slovenia) Kaja Juvan	5	6	6

==== Fourth qualifier ====
First round
4/WC	(Spain) Aliona Bolsova	7^{7}	6
(China) Han Xinyun	6^{5}	3
(Czech Republic) Tereza Martincová	6	7
7	(United States) Christina McHale	2	5

Qualifying competition
4/WC	(Spain) Aliona Bolsova	7^{9}	4	3
(Czech Republic) Tereza Martincová	6^{7}	6	6

==== Fifth qualifier ====
First round
5	(Switzerland) Jil Teichmann	6	7^{7}
(Hungary) Fanny Stollár	3	6^{5}
WC	(Austria) Mira Antonitsch	4	6	6^{4}
8	(Belgium) Ysaline Bonaventure	6	4	7^{7}

Qualifying competition
5	(Switzerland) Jil Teichmann	3	3
8	(Belgium) Ysaline Bonaventure	6	6

==== Sixth qualifier ====
First round
6	(France) Fiona Ferro	6	6
(Spain) Georgina García Pérez	2	2
PR	(United States) Shelby Rogers	6^{5}	6	6
12	(Netherlands) Arantxa Rus	7^{7}	4	4

Qualifying competition
6	(France) Fiona Ferro	6	6^{1}	3
PR	(United States) Shelby Rogers	1	7^{7}	6
