= 2019 Wuhan Open – Singles =

Singles
- 2019 Wuhan Open

Final
- Champion: (Belarus) Aryna Sabalenka
- Runner-up: (United States) Alison Riske
- Score: 6–3, 3–6, 6–1

Details
- Draw: 56 (8 Q / 4 WC )
- Seeds: 16

Events
Singles	Doubles
- Wuhan Open

Defending champion Aryna Sabalenka defeated Alison Riske in the final, 6–3, 3–6, 6–1 to win the singles tennis title at the 2019 Wuhan Open.

Ashleigh Barty retained the WTA No. 1 singles ranking at the end of the tournament. Karolína Plíšková was also in contention for the top ranking.

== Seeds ==
The top eight seeds received a bye into the second round.

1. (Australia) Ashleigh Barty (semifinals)
2. (Czech Republic) Karolína Plíšková (third round)
3. (Ukraine) Elina Svitolina (quarterfinals)
4. (Romania) Simona Halep (third round, retired)
5. (Czech Republic) Petra Kvitová (semifinals)
6. (Netherlands) Kiki Bertens (third round)
7. (Switzerland) Belinda Bencic (second round)
8. (China) Wang Qiang (third round)

9. (Belarus) Aryna Sabalenka (champion)
10. (United States) Sloane Stephens (third round)
11. (Germany) Angelique Kerber (first round)
12. (United States) Madison Keys (withdrew)
13. (Denmark) Caroline Wozniacki (first round)
14. (Latvia) Anastasija Sevastova (first round)
15. (United States) Sofia Kenin (third round)
16. (Croatia) Donna Vekić (first round)

Click on the seed number of a player to go to their draw section.

== Draw ==
Key

- Q = Qualifier
- WC = Wild card
- LL = Lucky loser
- Alt = Alternate
- ITF = ITF entry
- PR = Protected ranking
- SR = Special ranking
- SE = Special exempt
- JE = Junior exempt
- JR = Junior Accelerator Programme entrant
- CO = College Accelerator Programme entrant
- NG = Next Gen Accelerator Program entrant
- w/o = Walkover
- r = Retired
- d = Defaulted

=== Finals ===
Quarterfinals
1	(Australia) Ashleigh Barty	7^{8}	3	6
(Croatia) Petra Martić	6^{6}	6	3
WC	(Kazakhstan) Elena Rybakina	3	6	1
9	(Belarus) Aryna Sabalenka	6	1	6
(United States) Alison Riske	6	6
3	(Ukraine) Elina Svitolina	1	3
5	(Czech Republic) Petra Kvitová	6	6
(Ukraine) Dayana Yastremska	2	4

Semifinals
1	(Australia) Ashleigh Barty	5	4
9	(Belarus) Aryna Sabalenka	7	6
(United States) Alison Riske	7	7
5	(Czech Republic) Petra Kvitová	5	5

Final
9	(Belarus) Aryna Sabalenka	6	3	6
(United States) Alison Riske	3	6	1

=== Top half ===
==== Section 1 ====
First round
(Russia) D Kasatkina	2	2
(France) C Garcia	6	6
(Czech Republic) K Siniaková	4	0
(Belgium) E Mertens	6	6
(Russia) A Pavlyuchenkova	2	6^{5}
15	(United States) S Kenin	6	7^{7}
LL	(Sweden) R Peterson	6	0
(Italy) C Giorgi	2	0^{r}
(Croatia) P Martić	6	6
(France) K Mladenovic	2	2
Q	(Russia) V Kudermetova	5	6	6
(Russia) E Alexandrova	7	3	2

Second round
1	(Australia) A Barty	4	6	6
(France) C Garcia	6	4	1
(Belgium) E Mertens	6	4	6^{5}
15	(United States) S Kenin	4	6	7^{7}
LL	(Sweden) R Peterson	0	6	1
(Croatia) P Martić	6	3	6
Q	(Russia) V Kudermetova	2	6	6
7	(Switzerland) B Bencic	6	3	4

Third round
1	(Australia) A Barty	6	7
15	(United States) S Kenin	3	5
(Croatia) P Martić	6	6
Q	(Russia) V Kudermetova	3	1

Quarterfinals
1	(Australia) A Barty	7^{8}	3	6
(Croatia) P Martić	6^{6}	6	3

==== Section 2 ====
First round
(Czech Republic) B Strýcová	6	6
WC	(China) Xiy Wang	4	2
WC	(Kazakhstan) E Rybakina	7	2	6
Q	(China) L Zhu	5	6	0
LL	(Tunisia) O Jabeur	4	6	6
16	(Croatia) D Vekić	6	3	3
9	(Belarus) A Sabalenka	6	6
(Belarus) A Sasnovich	1	2
WC	(United States) V Williams	5	6^{5}
(United States) D Collins	7	7^{7}
Q	(United States) J Brady	4	6	4
Q	(United States) B Pera	6	3	6

Second round
4	(Romania) S Halep	6	6
(Czech Republic) B Strýcová	3	2
WC	(Kazakhstan) E Rybakina	6	6^{3}	6
LL	(Tunisia) O Jabeur	1	7^{7}	2
9	(Belarus) A Sabalenka	6	6
(United States) D Collins	1	0
Q	(United States) B Pera	6	4	2
6	(Netherlands) K Bertens	3	6	6

Third round
4	(Romania) S Halep	4^{r}
WC	(Kazakhstan) E Rybakina	5
9	(Belarus) A Sabalenka	6	7^{11}
6	(Netherlands) K Bertens	1	6^{9}

Quarterfinals
WC	(Kazakhstan) E Rybakina	3	6	1
9	(Belarus) A Sabalenka	6	1	6

=== Bottom half ===
==== Section 3 ====
First round
(Czech Republic) M Bouzková	6	6
LL	(Slovenia) T Zidanšek	1	3
Q	(Ukraine) K Kozlova	6	3	3
(United States) A Riske	4	6	6
(Puerto Rico) M Puig	7^{7}	5	6
11	(Germany) A Kerber	6^{5}	7	1
13	(Denmark) C Wozniacki	7^{7}	1	2
(Chinese Taipei) S-w Hsieh	6^{2}	6	6
Q	(Russia) S Kuznetsova	6	1
(Kazakhstan) Y Putintseva	1	0^{r}
WC	(China) S Peng	3	2
(Spain) G Muguruza	6	6

Second round
8	(China) Q Wang	6	6
(Czech Republic) M Bouzková	3	3
(United States) A Riske	2	7^{7}	6
(Puerto Rico) M Puig	6	6^{5}	3
(Chinese Taipei) S-w Hsieh	2	6^{5}
Q	(Russia) S Kuznetsova	6	7^{7}
(Spain) G Muguruza	5	2
3	(Ukraine) E Svitolina	7	6

Third round
8	(China) Q Wang	2	1
(United States) A Riske	6	6
Q	(Russia) S Kuznetsova	4	2
3	(Ukraine) E Svitolina	6	6

Quarterfinals
(United States) A Riske	6	6
3	(Ukraine) E Svitolina	1	3

==== Section 4 ====
First round
(United States) J Pegula	0	1
(Slovenia) P Hercog	6	6
(China) Y Wang	4	6	4
Q	(United States) L Davis	6	4	0^{r}
(China) S Zhang	5	4
10	(United States) S Stephens	7	6
14	(Latvia) A Sevastova	6	3	3
Q	(United States) C McHale	4	6	6
(Australia) A Tomljanović	6^{5}	2
(Ukraine) D Yastremska	7^{7}	6
WC	(Australia) S Stosur	3	6	3
(United States) A Anisimova	6	3	6

Second round
5	(Czech Republic) P Kvitová	7^{8}	6
(Slovenia) P Hercog	6^{6}	3
(China) Y Wang	2	6	1
10	(United States) S Stephens	6	3	6
Q	(United States) C McHale	3	6^{7}
(Ukraine) D Yastremska	6	7^{9}
(United States) A Anisimova	3	3
2	(Czech Republic) Ka Plíšková	6	6

Third round
5	(Czech Republic) P Kvitová	6	6
10	(United States) S Stephens	3	3
(Ukraine) D Yastremska	6	6
2	(Czech Republic) Ka Plíšková	1	4

Quarterfinals
5	(Czech Republic) P Kvitová	6	6
(Ukraine) D Yastremska	2	4

== Qualifying ==
=== Seeds ===
1. (Russia) Veronika Kudermetova (qualified)
2. (Sweden) Rebecca Peterson (qualifying competition, lucky loser)
3. (Tunisia) Ons Jabeur (qualifying competition, lucky loser)
4. (France) Fiona Ferro (first round)
5. (United States) Lauren Davis (qualified)
6. (Russia) Svetlana Kuznetsova (qualified)
7. (United States) Jennifer Brady (qualified)
8. (Slovenia) Tamara Zidanšek (qualifying competition, lucky loser)
9. (Switzerland) Jil Teichmann (first round)
10. (United States) Bernarda Pera (qualified)
11. (Ukraine) Kateryna Kozlova (qualified)
12. (Switzerland) Viktorija Golubic (withdrew, still competing in Guangzhou)
13. (Russia) Anna Blinkova (withdrew, still competing in Guangzhou)
14. (Germany) Andrea Petkovic (first round)
15. (Kazakhstan) Zarina Diyas (qualifying competition)
16. (Spain) Paula Badosa (withdrew, still competing in Seoul)

=== Qualifiers ===
1. (Russia) Veronika Kudermetova
2. (Ukraine) Kateryna Kozlova
3. (China) Zhu Lin
4. (United States) Christina McHale
5. (United States) Lauren Davis
6. (Russia) Svetlana Kuznetsova
7. (United States) Jennifer Brady
8. (United States) Bernarda Pera

=== Lucky losers ===
1. (Tunisia) Ons Jabeur
2. (Sweden) Rebecca Peterson
3. (Slovenia) Tamara Zidanšek

=== Draw ===
==== First qualifier ====
First round
1	(Russia) Veronika Kudermetova	7^{7}	6
(Belgium) Yanina Wickmayer	6^{4}	3
(Japan) Kurumi Nara	4	6	6
Alt	(China) Wang Xinyu	6	3	4

Qualifying competition
1	(Russia) Veronika Kudermetova	6	2	7
(Japan) Kurumi Nara	1	6	5

==== Second qualifier ====
First round
2	(Sweden) Rebecca Peterson	6	6
(United Kingdom) Heather Watson	2	2
(United States) Sachia Vickery	7	6^{4}	0
11	(Ukraine) Kateryna Kozlova	5	7^{7}	6

Qualifying competition
2	(Sweden) Rebecca Peterson	1	6	5
11	(Ukraine) Kateryna Kozlova	6	4	7

==== Third qualifier ====
First round
3	(Tunisia) Ons Jabeur	6	7^{7}
Alt	(United States) Nicole Melichar	0	6^{5}
(China) Zhu Lin	6	6
Alt	(Canada) Gabriela Dabrowski	3	4

Qualifying competition
3	(Tunisia) Ons Jabeur	6	1	1
(China) Zhu Lin	2	6	6

==== Fourth qualifier ====
First round
4	(France) Fiona Ferro	6	4	2
(China) Han Xinyun	2	6	6
(United States) Christina McHale	6	7
14	(Germany) Andrea Petkovic	0	5

Qualifying competition
(China) Han Xinyun	1	6	2
(United States) Christina McHale	6	4	6

==== Fifth qualifier ====
First round
5	(United States) Lauren Davis	6	6
(Netherlands) Lesley Pattinama Kerkhove	2	2
WC	(Denmark) Clara Tauson	4	6	2
15	(Kazakhstan) Zarina Diyas	6	2	6

Qualifying competition
5	(United States) Lauren Davis	6	6
15	(Kazakhstan) Zarina Diyas	3	4

==== Sixth qualifier ====
First round
6	(Russia) Svetlana Kuznetsova	6	6
WC	(China) Zheng Qinwen	2	4
WC	(China) Xun Fangying	6	4	3
Alt	(United States) Bethanie Mattek-Sands	2	6	6

Qualifying competition
6	(Russia) Svetlana Kuznetsova	6	6
Alt	(United States) Bethanie Mattek-Sands	2	2

==== Seventh qualifier ====
First round
7	(United States) Jennifer Brady	6	6
WC	(China) Yuan Yue	4	3
(Australia) Ellen Perez	3	6	6
9	(Switzerland) Jil Teichmann	6	0	3

Qualifying competition
7	(United States) Jennifer Brady	7	6
(Australia) Ellen Perez	5	3

==== Eighth qualifier ====
First round
8	(Slovenia) Tamara Zidanšek	1	6	6
(United States) Whitney Osuigwe	6	4	2
(United States) Nicole Gibbs	2	5
10	(United States) Bernarda Pera	6	7

Qualifying competition
8	(Slovenia) Tamara Zidanšek	5	5
10	(United States) Bernarda Pera	7	7
