= 2019 Qatar Total Open – Singles =

Singles
- 2019 Qatar Total Open

Final
- Champion: (Belgium) Elise Mertens
- Runner-up: (Romania) Simona Halep
- Score: 3–6, 6–4, 6–3

Details
- Draw: 28 (4 Q / 4 WC )
- Seeds: 8

Events
Singles	Doubles
- Qatar Total Open

Elise Mertens defeated Simona Halep in the final, 3–6, 6–4, 6–3 to win the singles tennis title at the 2019 WTA Qatar Open.

Petra Kvitová was the reigning champion, but chose not to participate.

== Seeds ==
The top four seeds received a bye into the second round.

1. (Romania) Simona Halep (final)
2. (Czech Republic) Karolína Plíšková (withdrew)
3. (Germany) Angelique Kerber (semifinals)
4. (Ukraine) Elina Svitolina (semifinals)
5. (Netherlands) Kiki Bertens (quarterfinals)
6. (Denmark) Caroline Wozniacki (withdrew)
7. (Latvia) Anastasija Sevastova (first round)
8. (Australia) Ashleigh Barty (withdrew)
9. (Germany) Julia Görges (quarterfinals)

== Draw ==
Key

- Q = Qualifier
- WC = Wild card
- LL = Lucky loser
- Alt = Alternate
- ITF = ITF entry
- PR = Protected ranking
- SR = Special ranking
- SE = Special exempt
- JE = Junior exempt
- JR = Junior Accelerator Programme entrant
- CO = College Accelerator Programme entrant
- NG = Next Gen Accelerator Program entrant
- w/o = Walkover
- r = Retired
- d = Defaulted

=== Finals ===
Semifinals
1	(Romania) Simona Halep	6	3	6
4/WC	(Ukraine) Elina Svitolina	3	6	4
3	(Germany) Angelique Kerber	4	6	1
(Belgium) Elise Mertens	6	2	6

Final
1	(Romania) Simona Halep	6	4	3
(Belgium) Elise Mertens	3	6	6

=== Top half ===
First round
LL	(Spain) L Arruabarrena	3	0
(Ukraine) L Tsurenko	6	6
LL	(United States) A Riske	6	6
LL	(Slovenia) P Hercog	4	3
Q	(Australia) A Tomljanović	2	2
9	(Germany) J Görges	6	6
(Romania) M Buzărnescu	1	6	2
(Latvia) J Ostapenko	6	4	6
(Belarus) A Sasnovich	2	0
(Chinese Taipei) S-w Hsieh	6	6
Q	(Czech Republic) K Muchová	6	6
LL	(Australia) S Stosur	4	2

Second round
1	(Romania) S Halep	6	6
(Ukraine) L Tsurenko	2	3
LL	(United States) A Riske	1	7^{7}	4
9	(Germany) J Görges	6	6^{5}	6
4/WC	(Ukraine) E Svitolina	6	6
(Latvia) J Ostapenko	4	4
(Chinese Taipei) S-w Hsieh	2	4
Q	(Czech Republic) K Muchová	6	6

Quarterfinals
1	(Romania) S Halep	7^{7}	7^{8}
9	(Germany) J Görges	6^{1}	6^{6}
4/WC	(Ukraine) E Svitolina	6	6
Q	(Czech Republic) K Muchová	4	2

Semifinals
1	(Romania) S Halep	6	3	6
4/WC	(Ukraine) E Svitolina	3	6	4

=== Bottom half ===
First round
7	(Latvia) A Sevastova	6^{5}	4
Q	(Russia) A Blinkova	7^{7}	6
(Czech Republic) B Strýcová	6	6
WC	(Oman) F Al-Nabhani	1	1
(Estonia) A Kontaveit	7^{7}	6
Q	(China) L Zhu	6^{3}	3
5	(Netherlands) K Bertens	0	7^{9}	6
(Italy) C Giorgi	6	6^{7}	4
WC	(Tunisia) O Jabeur	3	1
(Spain) C Suárez Navarro	6	6
(Belgium) E Mertens	6	6
(Czech Republic) K Siniaková	4	2

Second round
Q	(Russia) A Blinkova	0	6	0
(Czech Republic) B Strýcová	6	3	6
(Estonia) A Kontaveit	1	6^{3}
3	(Germany) A Kerber	6	7^{7}
5	(Netherlands) K Bertens	2	6	6
(Spain) C Suárez Navarro	6	1	1
(Belgium) E Mertens	6	7^{7}
LL	(Czech Republic) Kr Plíšková	2	6^{3}

Quarterfinals
(Czech Republic) B Strýcová	6	2	6^{4}
3	(Germany) A Kerber	1	6	7^{7}
5	(Netherlands) K Bertens	4	3
(Belgium) E Mertens	6	6

Semifinals
3	(Germany) A Kerber	4	6	1
(Belgium) E Mertens	6	2	6

== Qualifying ==
=== Seeds ===
The top seed received a bye into the second round.

1. (Australia) Ajla Tomljanović (qualified)
2. (United States) Alison Riske (qualifying competition, lucky loser)
3. (Slovenia) Tamara Zidanšek (first round)
4. (Australia) Samantha Stosur (qualifying competition, lucky loser)
5. (Canada) Eugenie Bouchard (first round)
6. (United States) Bernarda Pera (second round)
7. (Slovenia) Polona Hercog (qualifying competition, lucky loser)
8. (Czech Republic) Kristýna Plíšková (second round, lucky loser)

=== Qualifiers ===
1. (Australia) Ajla Tomljanović
2. (China) Zhu Lin
3. (Czech Republic) Karolína Muchová
4. (Russia) Anna Blinkova

=== Lucky losers ===
1. (United States) Alison Riske
2. (Slovenia) Polona Hercog
3. (Australia) Samantha Stosur
4. (Spain) Lara Arruabarrena
5. (Czech Republic) Kristýna Plíšková

=== Draw ===
==== First qualifier ====
First round
(Romania) Sorana Cîrstea	6	0	3
(Japan) Shuko Aoyama	4	6	6
(United States) Abigail Spears	2	4
(Uzbekistan) Sabina Sharipova	6	6
WC	(United States) Julia Elbaba	1	3
7	(Slovenia) Polona Hercog	6	6

Second round
1	(Australia) Ajla Tomljanović	7	6^{6}	6
(Japan) Shuko Aoyama	5	7^{8}	4
(Uzbekistan) Sabina Sharipova	5	5
7	(Slovenia) Polona Hercog	7	7

Qualifying competition
1	(Australia) Ajla Tomljanović	6	6
7	(Slovenia) Polona Hercog	3	4

==== Second qualifier ====
First round
2	(United States) Alison Riske	6	6
(Russia) Anna Kalinskaya	2	2
(United States) Jennifer Brady	6	6
(Ukraine) Anhelina Kalinina	1	2
(Romania) Alexandra Dulgheru	6	1	4
(China) Zhu Lin	4	6	6
(United States) Madison Brengle	5	6	6
5	(Canada) Eugenie Bouchard	7	3	4

Second round
2	(United States) Alison Riske	6	6
(United States) Jennifer Brady	2	4
(China) Zhu Lin	6	6
(United States) Madison Brengle	1	3

Qualifying competition
2	(United States) Alison Riske	2	1
(China) Zhu Lin	6	6

==== Third qualifier ====
First round
3	(Slovenia) Tamara Zidanšek	3	6	3
(Russia) Liudmila Samsonova	6	4	6
WC	(Colombia) Mariana Ramírez Nieto	1	1
(Spain) Lara Arruabarrena	6	6
WC	(Qatar) Mubaraka Al-Naimi	0	0
(Czech Republic) Karolína Muchová	6	6
(Chinese Taipei) Chan Hao-ching	3	2
8	(Czech Republic) Kristýna Plíšková	6	6

Second round
(Russia) Liudmila Samsonova	6	6
(Spain) Lara Arruabarrena	2	4
(Czech Republic) Karolína Muchová	6	4	6
8	(Czech Republic) Kristýna Plíšková	3	6	4

Qualifying competition
(Russia) Liudmila Samsonova	1	6	1
(Czech Republic) Karolína Muchová	6	3	6

==== Fourth qualifier ====
First round
4	(Australia) Samantha Stosur	6	6
(China) Xu Shilin	2	2
(United States) Varvara Lepchenko	7^{7}	4	3
(Croatia) Tereza Mrdeža	6^{5}	6	6
WC	(United Kingdom) Emily Webley-Smith	2	1
(Russia) Anna Blinkova	6	6
(Russia) Veronika Kudermetova	1	6	5
6	(United States) Bernarda Pera	6	2	7

Second round
4	(Australia) Samantha Stosur	6	6
(Croatia) Tereza Mrdeža	3	4
(Russia) Anna Blinkova	7	6
6	(United States) Bernarda Pera	5	2

Qualifying competition
4	(Australia) Samantha Stosur	6^{1}	6	4
(Russia) Anna Blinkova	7^{7}	3	6
