= 2024 Coco Gauff tennis season =

Tennis season statistics

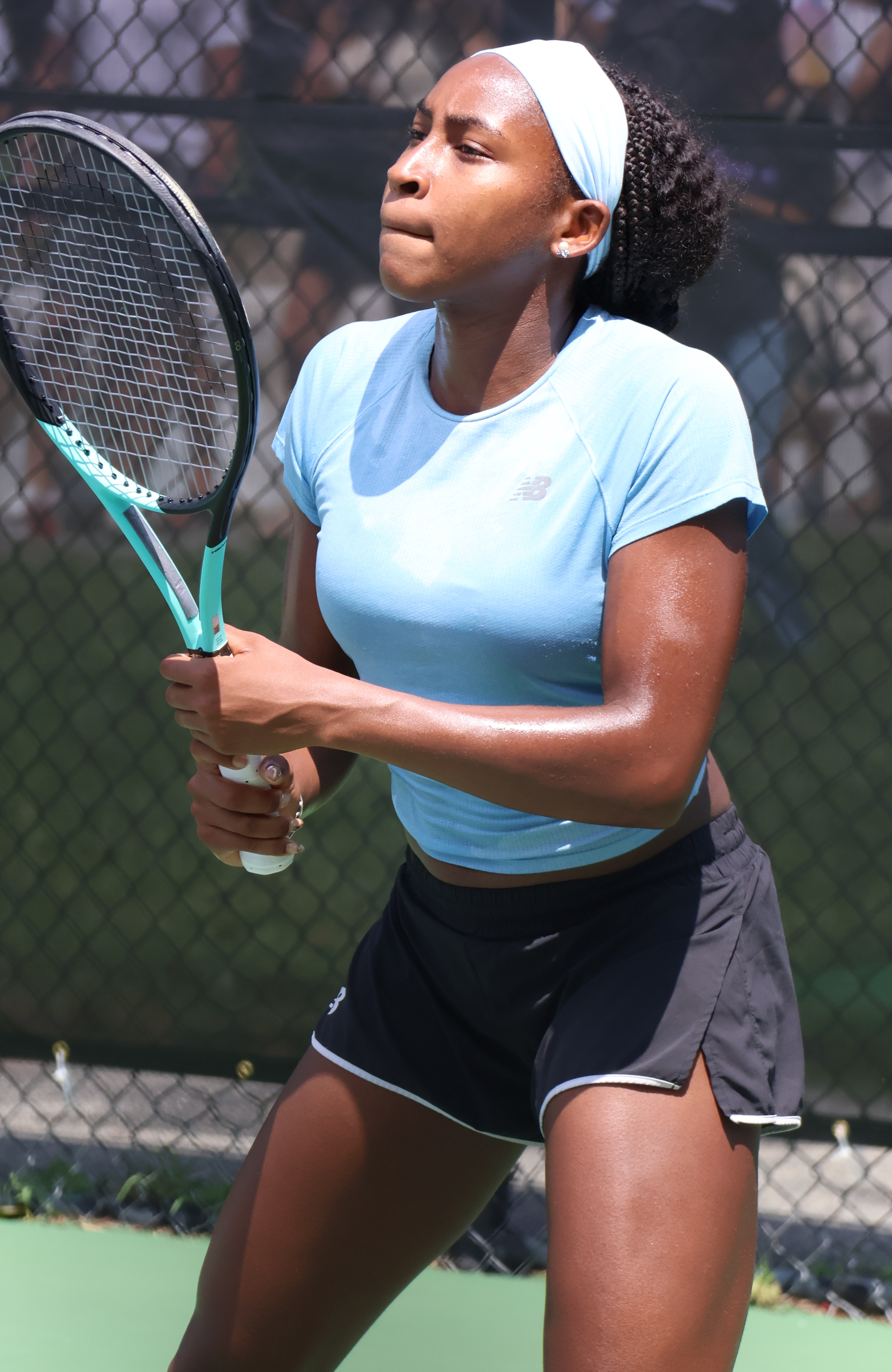
- Gauff at the 2023 Washington Open
- Full name: Cori Dionne "Coco" Gauff
- Country: United States
- Calendar prize money: $9,353,847

Singles
- Season record: 54–17 (76%)
- Calendar titles: 3
- Year-end ranking: No. 3
- Ranking change from previous year: Steady

Grand Slam & significant results
- Australian Open: SF
- French Open: SF
- Wimbledon: 4R
- US Open: 4R
- Championships: W
- Olympic Games: 3R

Doubles
- Season record: 18–7 (72%)
- Calendar titles: 1
- Current ranking: No. 16
- Ranking change from previous year: ▼13

Grand Slam doubles results
- Australian Open: A
- French Open: W
- Wimbledon: QF
- US Open: A
- Olympic Games: 2R

Mixed doubles
- Season record: 1–1

Grand Slam mixed doubles results
- Olympic Games: QF
- Notes: Split with her coach Brad Gilbert in September, Matt Daly took his place.
- Last updated on: 10 November 2024.

The 2024 Coco Gauff tennis season officially began on 1 January 2024, with the start of the Auckland Classic in Auckland.

== Yearly summary ==
At the Italian Open she reached the semifinal for the second time at this tournament and second at the WTA 1000 level for the season defeating Magdalena Fręch, Jaqueline Cristian, Paula Badosa and seventh seed Zheng Qinwen. With the win, she passed Caroline Wozniacki for the most WTA 1000 wins before turning 21. She lost to world No. 1 Iga Świątek, in straight sets. At the same tournament, partnering Erin Routliffe, she reached a consecutive final in doubles.

At the 2024 French Open with new partner Katerina Siniaková, she lifted her first Grand Slam tournament doubles trophy defeating 11th seeds Sara Errani and Jasmine Paolini in the final. In singles, also at Roland Garros, she reached the semifinals and was defeated by eventual champion Iga Swiatek, but despite the loss reached a new career-high ranking of world No. 2 in singles on 10 June 2024.

At the 2024 Wimbledon Championships, Gauff went out in the fourth round to Emma Navarro. Gauff was chosen by her Olympic teammates to be the female flag-bearer for the United States at the opening ceremony of the 2024 Summer Olympics in Paris, alongside LeBron James. She became the youngest athlete to be so honored. In singles, she lost in the third round to Donna Vekić in straight sets. At the 2024 China Open, she became the youngest China Open champion in 14 years after defeating Karolina Muchova in the final. It was her second WTA 1000 title and eighth career singles title. Gauff will be the second American champion in Beijing, following Serena Williams title runs in 2004 and 2013.

On November 9, 2024, Gauff won the 2024 WTA Finals singles champion, becoming the youngest player to win the WTA Finals since Maria Sharapova in 2004 and the first American to win the finals since Serena Williams in 2014. She beat Iga Swiatek, the No. 2 seed and defending champion of the WTA final in Riyadh. She then defeated Sabalenka in the semis and Zheng Qinwen in the finals to capture her first year-end singles championship title.

== All matches ==
This table chronicles all the matches of Coco Gauff in 2024.

Key
W	F	SF	QF	#R	RR	Q#	P#	DNQ	A	Z#	PO	G	S	B	NMS	NTI	P	NH

(W) winner; (F) finalist; (SF) semifinalist; (QF) quarterfinalist; (#R) rounds 4, 3, 2, 1; (RR) round-robin stage; (Q#) qualification round; (P#) preliminary round; (DNQ) did not qualify; (A) absent; (Z#) Davis/Fed Cup Zonal Group (with number indication) or (PO) play-off; (G) gold, (S) silver or (B) bronze Olympic/Paralympic medal; (NMS) not a Masters tournament; (NTI) not a Tier I tournament; (P) postponed; (NH) not held; (SR) strike rate (events won / competed); (W–L) win–loss record.
To avoid confusion and double counting, these charts are updated at the conclusion of a tournament or when the player's participation has ended.

=== Singles matches ===
Tournament	Match	Round	Opponent	Rank	Result	Score
WTA Auckland Open; Auckland, New Zealand; WTA 250; Hard, outdoor; 1 January 2024 – 7 January 2024	1	1R	(United States) Claire Liu	124	Win	6–4, 6–2
WTA Auckland Open; Auckland, New Zealand; WTA 250; Hard, outdoor; 1 January 2024 – 7 January 2024	2	2R	(Czech Republic) Brenda Fruhvirtová (Q)	117	Win	6–3, 6–0
WTA Auckland Open; Auckland, New Zealand; WTA 250; Hard, outdoor; 1 January 2024 – 7 January 2024	3	QF	(France) Varvara Gracheva (8)	28	Win	6–1, 6–1
WTA Auckland Open; Auckland, New Zealand; WTA 250; Hard, outdoor; 1 January 2024 – 7 January 2024	4	SF	(United States) Emma Navarro (4)	40	Win	6–3, 6–1
WTA Auckland Open; Auckland, New Zealand; WTA 250; Hard, outdoor; 1 January 2024 – 7 January 2024	5	W	(Ukraine) Elina Svitolina (2)	25	Win (1)	6–7^{(4–7)}, 6–3, 6–3
Australian Open; Melbourne, Australia; Grand Slam; Hard, outdoor; 14 January 2024 – 28 January 2024	6	1R	(Slovakia) Anna Karolína Schmiedlová	68	Win	6–3, 6–0
Australian Open; Melbourne, Australia; Grand Slam; Hard, outdoor; 14 January 2024 – 28 January 2024	7	2R	(United States) Caroline Dolehide	107	Win	7–6^{(7–2)}, 6–2
Australian Open; Melbourne, Australia; Grand Slam; Hard, outdoor; 14 January 2024 – 28 January 2024	8	3R	(United States) Alycia Parks	82	Win	6–0, 6–2
Australian Open; Melbourne, Australia; Grand Slam; Hard, outdoor; 14 January 2024 – 28 January 2024	9	4R	(Poland) Magdalena Fręch	69	Win	6–1, 6–2
Australian Open; Melbourne, Australia; Grand Slam; Hard, outdoor; 14 January 2024 – 28 January 2024	10	QF	(Ukraine) Marta Kostyuk	37	Win	7–6^{(8–6)}, 6–7^{(3–7)}, 6–2
Australian Open; Melbourne, Australia; Grand Slam; Hard, outdoor; 14 January 2024 – 28 January 2024	11	SF	Aryna Sabalenka (Note: Russian and Belarus players are not allowed to compete under the name or flag of their country following the Russian invasion of Ukraine.) (2)	2	Loss	6–7^{(2–7)}, 4–6
Qatar Open; Doha, Qatar; WTA 1000; Hard, outdoor; 11 February 2024 – 17 February 2024	–	1R	Bye			
Qatar Open; Doha, Qatar; WTA 1000; Hard, outdoor; 11 February 2024 – 17 February 2024	12	2R	(Czech Republic) Kateřina Siniaková	42	Loss	2–6, 4–6
Dubai Tennis Championships; Dubai, United Arab Emirates; WTA 1000; Hard, outdoor; 18 February 2024 – 24 February 2024	–	1R	Bye			
Dubai Tennis Championships; Dubai, United Arab Emirates; WTA 1000; Hard, outdoor; 18 February 2024 – 24 February 2024	13	2R	(Italy) Elisabetta Cocciaretto (LL)	58	Win	6–1, 7–5
Dubai Tennis Championships; Dubai, United Arab Emirates; WTA 1000; Hard, outdoor; 18 February 2024 – 24 February 2024	14	3R	(Czech Republic) Karolína Plíšková	36	Win	2–6, 6–3, 6–4
Dubai Tennis Championships; Dubai, United Arab Emirates; WTA 1000; Hard, outdoor; 18 February 2024 – 24 February 2024	15	QF	Anna Kalinskaya	40	Loss	6–2, 4–6, 2–6
Indian Wells Open; Indian Wells, United States; WTA 1000; Hard, outdoor; 6 March 2024 – 17 March 2024	–	1R	Bye			
Indian Wells Open; Indian Wells, United States; WTA 1000; Hard, outdoor; 6 March 2024 – 17 March 2024	16	2R	(France) Clara Burel	47	Win	2–6, 6–3, 7–6^{(7–4)}
Indian Wells Open; Indian Wells, United States; WTA 1000; Hard, outdoor; 6 March 2024 – 17 March 2024	17	3R	(Italy) Lucia Bronzetti	53	Win	6–2, 7–6^{(7–5)}
Indian Wells Open; Indian Wells, United States; WTA 1000; Hard, outdoor; 6 March 2024 – 17 March 2024	18	4R	(Belgium) Elise Mertens (24)	28	Win	6–0, 6–2
Indian Wells Open; Indian Wells, United States; WTA 1000; Hard, outdoor; 6 March 2024 – 17 March 2024	19	QF	(China) Yuan Yue	49	Win	6–4, 6–3
Indian Wells Open; Indian Wells, United States; WTA 1000; Hard, outdoor; 6 March 2024 – 17 March 2024	20	SF	(Greece) Maria Sakkari (9)	9	Loss	4–6, 7–6^{(7–5)}, 2–6
Miami Open; Miami Gardens, United States; WTA 1000; Hard, outdoor; 19 March 2024 – 31 March 2024	–	1R	Bye			
Miami Open; Miami Gardens, United States; WTA 1000; Hard, outdoor; 19 March 2024 – 31 March 2024	21	2R	(Argentina) Nadia Podoroska (Q)	78	Win	6–1, 6–2
Miami Open; Miami Gardens, United States; WTA 1000; Hard, outdoor; 19 March 2024 – 31 March 2024	22	3R	(France) Océane Dodin (LL)	84	Win	6–4, 6–0
Miami Open; Miami Gardens, United States; WTA 1000; Hard, outdoor; 19 March 2024 – 31 March 2024	23	4R	(France) Caroline Garcia (23)	27	Loss	3–6, 6–1, 2–6
Stuttgart Open; Stuttgart, Germany; WTA 500; Clay, indoor; 15 April 2024 – 21 April 2024	–	1R	Bye			
Stuttgart Open; Stuttgart, Germany; WTA 500; Clay, indoor; 15 April 2024 – 21 April 2024	24	2R	(United States) Sachia Vickery (Q)	134	Win	6–3, 4–6, 7–5
Stuttgart Open; Stuttgart, Germany; WTA 500; Clay, indoor; 15 April 2024 – 21 April 2024	25	QF	(Ukraine) Marta Kostyuk	27	Loss	6–3, 4–6, 6–7^{(6–8)}
Madrid Open; Madrid, Spain; WTA 1000; Clay, outdoor; 23 April 2024 – 5 May 2024	–	1R	Bye			
Madrid Open; Madrid, Spain; WTA 1000; Clay, outdoor; 23 April 2024 – 5 May 2024	26	2R	(Netherlands) Arantxa Rus	47	Win	6–0, 6–0
Madrid Open; Madrid, Spain; WTA 1000; Clay, outdoor; 23 April 2024 – 5 May 2024	27	3R	(Ukraine) Dayana Yastremska (31)	34	Win	6–4, 6–1
Madrid Open; Madrid, Spain; WTA 1000; Clay, outdoor; 23 April 2024 – 5 May 2024	28	4R	(United States) Madison Keys (18)	20	Loss	6–7^{(4–7)}, 6–4, 4–6
Italian Open; Rome, Italy; WTA 1000; Clay, outdoor; 8 May 2024 – 19 May 2024	–	1R	Bye			
Italian Open; Rome, Italy; WTA 1000; Clay, outdoor; 8 May 2024 – 19 May 2024	29	2R	(Poland) Magdalena Fręch	55	Win	6–3, 6–3
Italian Open; Rome, Italy; WTA 1000; Clay, outdoor; 8 May 2024 – 19 May 2024	30	3R	(Romania) Jaqueline Cristian (LL)	68	Win	6–1, 0–6, 6–3
Italian Open; Rome, Italy; WTA 1000; Clay, outdoor; 8 May 2024 – 19 May 2024	31	4R	(Spain) Paula Badosa (PR)	126	Win	5–7, 6–4, 6–1
Italian Open; Rome, Italy; WTA 1000; Clay, outdoor; 8 May 2024 – 19 May 2024	32	QF	(China) Zheng Qinwen (7)	7	Win	7–6^{(7–4)}, 6–1
Italian Open; Rome, Italy; WTA 1000; Clay, outdoor; 8 May 2024 – 19 May 2024	33	SF	(Poland) Iga Świątek (1)	1	Loss	4–6, 3–6
French Open; Paris, France; Grand Slam; Clay, outdoor; 20 May 2024 – 9 June 2024	34	1R	Julia Avdeeva (Q)	188	Win	6–1, 6–1
French Open; Paris, France; Grand Slam; Clay, outdoor; 20 May 2024 – 9 June 2024	35	2R	(Slovenia) Tamara Zidanšek (Q)	117	Win	6–3, 6–4
French Open; Paris, France; Grand Slam; Clay, outdoor; 20 May 2024 – 9 June 2024	36	3R	(Ukraine) Dayana Yastremska (30)	32	Win	6–2, 6–4
French Open; Paris, France; Grand Slam; Clay, outdoor; 20 May 2024 – 9 June 2024	37	4R	(Italy) Elisabetta Cocciaretto	51	Win	6–1, 6–2
French Open; Paris, France; Grand Slam; Clay, outdoor; 20 May 2024 – 9 June 2024	38	QF	(Tunisia) Ons Jabeur (8)	9	Win	4–6, 6–2, 6–3
French Open; Paris, France; Grand Slam; Clay, outdoor; 20 May 2024 – 9 June 2024	39	SF	(Poland) Iga Świątek (1)	1	Loss	2–6, 4–6
German Open; Berlin, Germany; WTA 500; Grass, outdoor; 17 June 2024 – 23 June 2024	–	1R	Bye			
German Open; Berlin, Germany; WTA 500; Grass, outdoor; 17 June 2024 – 23 June 2024	40	2R	Ekaterina Alexandrova	20	Win	6–1, 6–2
German Open; Berlin, Germany; WTA 500; Grass, outdoor; 17 June 2024 – 23 June 2024	41	QF	(Tunisia) Ons Jabeur (8)	10	Win	7–6^{(11–9)}, ret
German Open; Berlin, Germany; WTA 500; Grass, outdoor; 17 June 2024 – 23 June 2024	42	SF	(United States) Jessica Pegula (4)	5	Loss	5–7, 6–7^{(2–7)}
Wimbledon; London, United Kingdom; Grand Slam; Grass, outdoor; 1 July 2024 – 14 July 2024	43	1R	(United States) Caroline Dolehide	51	Win	6–1, 6–2
Wimbledon; London, United Kingdom; Grand Slam; Grass, outdoor; 1 July 2024 – 14 July 2024	44	2R	(Romania) Anca Todoni (Q)	142	Win	6–2, 6–1
Wimbledon; London, United Kingdom; Grand Slam; Grass, outdoor; 1 July 2024 – 14 July 2024	45	3R	(United Kingdom) Sonay Kartal (Q)	298	Win	6–4, 6–0
Wimbledon; London, United Kingdom; Grand Slam; Grass, outdoor; 1 July 2024 – 14 July 2024	46	4R	(United States) Emma Navarro (19)	17	Loss	4–6, 3–6
Summer Olympics; Paris, France; Olympic Games; Clay, outdoor; 27 July 2024 – 4 August 2024	47	1R	(Australia) Ajla Tomljanović (PR)	123	Win	6–3, 6–0
Summer Olympics; Paris, France; Olympic Games; Clay, outdoor; 27 July 2024 – 4 August 2024	48	2R	(Argentina) María Lourdes Carlé (ITF)	85	Win	6–1, 6–1
Summer Olympics; Paris, France; Olympic Games; Clay, outdoor; 27 July 2024 – 4 August 2024	49	3R	(Croatia) Donna Vekić (13)	21	Loss	6–7^{(7–9)}, 2–6
Canadian Open; Toronto, Canada; WTA 1000; Hard, outdoor; 6 August 2024 – 12 August 2024	–	1R	Bye			
Canadian Open; Toronto, Canada; WTA 1000; Hard, outdoor; 6 August 2024 – 12 August 2024	50	2R	(China) Wang Yafan (Q)	72	Win	6–4, 6–4
Canadian Open; Toronto, Canada; WTA 1000; Hard, outdoor; 6 August 2024 – 12 August 2024	51	3R	Diana Shnaider (13)	24	Loss	4–6, 1–6
Cincinnati Open; Mason, United States; WTA 1000; Hard, outdoor; 13 August 2024 – 19 August 2024	–	1R	Bye			
Cincinnati Open; Mason, United States; WTA 1000; Hard, outdoor; 13 August 2024 – 19 August 2024	52	2R	(Kazakhstan) Yulia Putintseva	34	Loss	4–6, 6–2, 4–6
US Open; New York City, United States; Grand Slam; Hard, outdoor; 26 August 2024 – 8 September 2024	53	1R	(France) Varvara Gracheva	66	Win	6–2, 6–0
US Open; New York City, United States; Grand Slam; Hard, outdoor; 26 August 2024 – 8 September 2024	54	2R	(Germany) Tatjana Maria	99	Win	6–4, 6–0
US Open; New York City, United States; Grand Slam; Hard, outdoor; 26 August 2024 – 8 September 2024	55	3R	(Ukraine) Elina Svitolina (27)	28	Win	3–6, 6–3, 6–3
US Open; New York City, United States; Grand Slam; Hard, outdoor; 26 August 2024 – 8 September 2024	56	4R	(United States) Emma Navarro (13)	12	Loss	3–6, 6–4, 3–6
China Open; Beijing, China; WTA 1000; Hard, outdoor; 25 September 2024– 6 October 2024	–	1R	Bye			
China Open; Beijing, China; WTA 1000; Hard, outdoor; 25 September 2024– 6 October 2024	57	2R	(France) Clara Burel	56	Win	7–5, 6–3
China Open; Beijing, China; WTA 1000; Hard, outdoor; 25 September 2024– 6 October 2024	58	3R	(United Kingdom) Katie Boulter (26)	34	Win	7–5, 6–2
China Open; Beijing, China; WTA 1000; Hard, outdoor; 25 September 2024– 6 October 2024	59	4R	(Japan) Naomi Osaka	24	Win	3–6, 6–4, ret
China Open; Beijing, China; WTA 1000; Hard, outdoor; 25 September 2024– 6 October 2024	60	QF	(Ukraine) Yuliia Starodubtseva (Q)	115	Win	2–6, 6–2, 6–2
China Open; Beijing, China; WTA 1000; Hard, outdoor; 25 September 2024– 6 October 2024	61	SF	(Spain) Paula Badosa (15)	19	Win	4–6, 6–4, 6–2
China Open; Beijing, China; WTA 1000; Hard, outdoor; 25 September 2024– 6 October 2024	62	W	(Czech Republic) Karolína Muchová	49	Win (2)	6–1, 6–3
Wuhan Open; Wuhan, China; WTA 1000; Hard, outdoor; 7 October 2024– 13 October 2024	–	1R	Bye			
Wuhan Open; Wuhan, China; WTA 1000; Hard, outdoor; 7 October 2024– 13 October 2024	63	2R	(Bulgaria) Viktoriya Tomova	48	Win	6–1, 6–2
Wuhan Open; Wuhan, China; WTA 1000; Hard, outdoor; 7 October 2024– 13 October 2024	64	3R	(Ukraine) Marta Kostyuk (13)	17	Win	6–4, 6–1
Wuhan Open; Wuhan, China; WTA 1000; Hard, outdoor; 7 October 2024– 13 October 2024	65	QF	(Poland) Magda Linette	45	Win	6–0, 6–4
Wuhan Open; Wuhan, China; WTA 1000; Hard, outdoor; 7 October 2024– 13 October 2024	66	SF	Aryna Sabalenka (1)	2	Loss	6–1, 4–6, 4–6
WTA Finals; Riyadh, Saudi Arabia; Year-end championships; Hard, indoor; 2 November 2024 – 9 November 2024	67	RR	(United States) Jessica Pegula (6)	6	Win	6–3, 6–2
WTA Finals; Riyadh, Saudi Arabia; Year-end championships; Hard, indoor; 2 November 2024 – 9 November 2024	68	RR	(Poland) Iga Świątek (2)	2	Win	6–3, 6–4
WTA Finals; Riyadh, Saudi Arabia; Year-end championships; Hard, indoor; 2 November 2024 – 9 November 2024	69	RR	(Czech Republic) Barbora Krejčíková (8)	13	Loss	5–7, 4–6
WTA Finals; Riyadh, Saudi Arabia; Year-end championships; Hard, indoor; 2 November 2024 – 9 November 2024	70	SF	Aryna Sabalenka (1)	1	Win	7–6^{(7–4)}, 6–4
WTA Finals; Riyadh, Saudi Arabia; Year-end championships; Hard, indoor; 2 November 2024 – 9 November 2024	71	W	(China) Zheng Qinwen (7)	7	Win (3)	3–6, 6–4, 7–6^{(7–2)}

=== Doubles matches ===
Tournament	Match	Round	Opponent	Rank	Result	Score
Indian Wells Open; Indian Wells, United States; WTA 1000; Hard, outdoor; 6 March 2024 – 17 March 2024; Partner: (United States) Jessica Pegula	1	1R	(United States) Sofia Kenin / (United States) Bethanie Mattek-Sands (WC)	105 / 40	Win	7–5, 6–3
Indian Wells Open; Indian Wells, United States; WTA 1000; Hard, outdoor; 6 March 2024 – 17 March 2024; Partner: (United States) Jessica Pegula	2	2R	(United States) Caroline Dolehide / (United States) Desirae Krawczyk	30 / 16	Win	7–6^{(12–10)}, 6–2
Indian Wells Open; Indian Wells, United States; WTA 1000; Hard, outdoor; 6 March 2024 – 17 March 2024; Partner: (United States) Jessica Pegula	3	QF	(United States) Asia Muhammad / (Japan) Ena Shibahara	61 / 21	Loss	2–6, 4–6
Miami Open; Miami Gardens, United States; WTA 1000; Hard, outdoor; 19 March 2024 – 31 March 2024; Partner: (United States) Jessica Pegula	4	1R	(United States) Ashlyn Krueger / (United States) Sloane Stephens (WC)	194 / 403	Loss	3–6, 6–1, [8–10]
Madrid Open; Madrid, Spain; WTA 1000; Clay, outdoor; 23 April 2024 – 5 May 2024; Partner: (United States) Taylor Townsend	5	1R	(Hungary) Anna Bondár / (Slovakia) Tereza Mihalíková	95 / 64	Win	6–3, 3–6, [10–7]
Madrid Open; Madrid, Spain; WTA 1000; Clay, outdoor; 23 April 2024 – 5 May 2024; Partner: (United States) Taylor Townsend	6	2R	(United States) Sofia Kenin / (United States) Bethanie Mattek-Sands	46 / 24	Win	6–2, 4–6, [10–8]
Madrid Open; Madrid, Spain; WTA 1000; Clay, outdoor; 23 April 2024 – 5 May 2024; Partner: (United States) Taylor Townsend	7	QF	(Czech Republic) Barbora Krejčíková / (Germany) Laura Siegemund (6)	32 / 6	Loss	4–6, 4–6
Italian Open; Rome, Italy; WTA 1000; Clay, outdoor; 8 May 2024 – 19 May 2024; Partner: (New Zealand) Erin Routliffe	8	1R	Anna Blinkova / Liudmila Samsonova	299 / 97	Win	4–6, 6–3, [10–4]
Italian Open; Rome, Italy; WTA 1000; Clay, outdoor; 8 May 2024 – 19 May 2024; Partner: (New Zealand) Erin Routliffe	9	2R	Mirra Andreeva / Vera Zvonareva	278 / 9	Win	6–2, 6–3
Italian Open; Rome, Italy; WTA 1000; Clay, outdoor; 8 May 2024 – 19 May 2024; Partner: (New Zealand) Erin Routliffe	10	QF	(Czech Republic) Kateřina Siniaková / (United States) Taylor Townsend (5)	12 / 13	Win	6–3, 7–6^{(7–3)}
Italian Open; Rome, Italy; WTA 1000; Clay, outdoor; 8 May 2024 – 19 May 2024; Partner: (New Zealand) Erin Routliffe	11	SF	(China) Wang Xinyu / (China) Zheng Saisai (PR)	20 / 259	Win	6–3, 7–6^{(7–3)}
Italian Open; Rome, Italy; WTA 1000; Clay, outdoor; 8 May 2024 – 19 May 2024; Partner: (New Zealand) Erin Routliffe	12	F	(Italy) Sara Errani / (Italy) Jasmine Paolini	49 / 39	Loss	3–6, 6–4, [8–10]
French Open; Paris, France; Grand Slam; Clay, outdoor; 20 May 2024 – 9 June 2024; Partner: (Czech Republic) Kateřina Siniaková	13	1R	(Kazakhstan) Anna Danilina / (China) Xu Yifan	59 / 44	Win	6–3, 6–0
French Open; Paris, France; Grand Slam; Clay, outdoor; 20 May 2024 – 9 June 2024; Partner: (Czech Republic) Kateřina Siniaková	14	2R	(Czech Republic) Miriam Kolodziejová / (Czech Republic) Anna Sisková (Alt)	75 / 78	Win	6–1, 6–2
French Open; Paris, France; Grand Slam; Clay, outdoor; 20 May 2024 – 9 June 2024; Partner: (Czech Republic) Kateřina Siniaková	15	3R	(Japan) Ena Shibahara / (China) Wang Xinyu (10)	24 / 16	Win	6–4, 6–4
French Open; Paris, France; Grand Slam; Clay, outdoor; 20 May 2024 – 9 June 2024; Partner: (Czech Republic) Kateřina Siniaková	16	QF	(Japan) Miyu Kato / (Ukraine) Nadiia Kichenok (16)	37 / 46	Win	6–0, 6–2
French Open; Paris, France; Grand Slam; Clay, outdoor; 20 May 2024 – 9 June 2024; Partner: (Czech Republic) Kateřina Siniaková	17	SF	(United States) Caroline Dolehide / (United States) Desirae Krawczyk (8)	23 / 14	Win	6–3, 7–6^{(7–3)}
French Open; Paris, France; Grand Slam; Clay, outdoor; 20 May 2024 – 9 June 2024; Partner: (Czech Republic) Kateřina Siniaková	18	W	(Italy) Sara Errani / (Italy) Jasmine Paolini (11)	28 / 26	Win (1)	7–6^{(7–5)}, 6–3
German Open; Berlin, Germany; WTA 500; Grass, outdoor; 17 June 2024 – 23 June 2024; Partner: (United States) Jessica Pegula	19	1R	(Czech Republic) Linda Nosková / (Czech Republic) Kateřina Siniaková	90 / 5	Loss	4–6, 0–6
Wimbledon; London, United Kingdom; Grand Slam; Grass, outdoor; 1 July 2024 – 14 July 2024; Partner: (United States) Jessica Pegula	20	1R	(Ukraine) Anhelina Kalinina / (Ukraine) Dayana Yastremska	103 / 212	Win	7–5, 6–7^{(7–9)}, 7–5
Wimbledon; London, United Kingdom; Grand Slam; Grass, outdoor; 1 July 2024 – 14 July 2024; Partner: (United States) Jessica Pegula	21	2R	(Kazakhstan) Anna Danilina / (China) Xu Yifan	52 / 53	Win	6–2, 7–6^{(7–3)}
Wimbledon; London, United Kingdom; Grand Slam; Grass, outdoor; 1 July 2024 – 14 July 2024; Partner: (United States) Jessica Pegula	22	3R	(Italy) Sara Errani / (Italy) Jasmine Paolini (5)	16 / 13	Win	6–2, 6–4
Wimbledon; London, United Kingdom; Grand Slam; Grass, outdoor; 1 July 2024 – 14 July 2024; Partner: (United States) Jessica Pegula	23	QF	(Chinese Taipei) Hsieh Su-wei / (Belgium) Elise Mertens (1)	2 / 1	Loss	2–6, 1–6
Summer Olympics; Paris, France; Olympic Games; Clay, outdoor; 27 July 2024 – 4 August 2024; Partner: (United States) Jessica Pegula	24	1R	(Australia) Ellen Perez / (Australia) Daria Saville	10 / 155	Win	6–3, 6–1
Summer Olympics; Paris, France; Olympic Games; Clay, outdoor; 27 July 2024 – 4 August 2024; Partner: (United States) Jessica Pegula	25	2R	(Czech Republic) Karolína Muchová / (Czech Republic) Linda Nosková	578 / 82	Loss	6–2, 4–6, [4–10]

=== Mixed doubles matches ===
Tournament	Match	Round	Opponent	Result	Score
Summer Olympics; Paris, France; Olympic Games; Clay, outdoor; 27 July 2024 – 4 August 2024; Partner: (United States) Taylor Fritz	1	1R	(Argentina) Máximo González / (Argentina) Nadia Podoroska (Alt)	Win	6–1, 6–7^{(6–8)}, [10–5]
Summer Olympics; Paris, France; Olympic Games; Clay, outdoor; 27 July 2024 – 4 August 2024; Partner: (United States) Taylor Fritz	2	QF	(Canada) Félix Auger-Aliassime / (Canada) Gabriela Dabrowski	Loss	6–7^{(2–7)}, 6–3, [8–10]

== Tournament schedule ==
Key
W	F	SF	QF	#R	RR

(W) winner; (F) finalist; (SF) semifinalist; (QF) quarterfinalist; (#R) rounds 4, 3, 2, 1; (RR) round-robin stage.

=== Singles schedule ===
Date	Tournament	Location	Category	Surface	Prev. result	Prev. points	New points	Outcome
1 January 2024 – 7 January 2024	WTA Auckland Open	New Zealand	WTA 250	Hard	W	280	250	Winner defeated (Ukraine) Elina Svitolina; 6–7^{(4–7)}, 6–3, 6–3
14 January 2024– 28 January 2024	Australian Open	Australia	Grand Slam	Hard	4R	240	780	Semifinal lost to Aryna Sabalenka; 6–7^{(2–7)}, 2–6
12 February 2024– 18 February 2024	Qatar Open	Qatar	WTA 1000	Hard	QF	100	10	Second round lost to (Czech Republic) Kateřina Siniaková; 2–6, 4–6
19 February 2024– 25 February 2024	Dubai Tennis Championships	UAE	WTA 1000	Hard	SF	350	215	Quarterfinal lost to Anna Kalinskaya; 6–2, 4–6, 2–6
6 March 2024 – 17 March 2024	Indian Wells Open	United States	WTA 1000	Hard	QF	215	390	Semifinal lost to (Greece) Maria Sakkari; 4–6, 7–6^{(7–5)}, 2–6
20 March 2024 – 31 March 2024	Miami Open	United States	WTA 1000	Hard	3R	45	120	Fourth round lost to (France) Caroline Garcia; 3–6, 6–1, 2–6
15 April 2024 – 21 April 2024	Stuttgart Open	Germany	WTA 500	Clay (i)	2R	55	108	Quarterfinal lost to (Ukraine) Marta Kostyuk; 6–3, 4–6, 6–7^{(6–8)}
23 April 2024 – 5 May 2024	Madrid Open	Spain	WTA 1000	Clay	3R	65	120	Fourth round lost to (United States) Madison Keys; 6–7^{(4–7)}, 6–4, 4–6
8 May 2024 – 19 May 2024	Italian Open	Italy	WTA 1000	Clay	3R	65	390	Semifinal lost to (Poland) Iga Świątek; 4–6, 3–6
20 May 2024 – 9 June 2024	French Open	France	Grand Slam	Clay	QF	430	780	Semifinal lost to (Poland) Iga Świątek; 2–6, 4–6
17 June 2024 – 23 June 2024	German Open	Germany	WTA 500	Grass	2R	55	195	Semifinal lost to (United States) Jessica Pegula; 5–7, 6–7^{(2–7)}
1 July 2024 – 14 July 2024	Wimbledon Championships	United Kingdom	Grand Slam	Grass	1R	10	240	Fourth round lost to (United States) Emma Navarro; 4–6, 3–6
27 July 2024 – 4 August 2024	Summer Olympics	France	Olympics	Clay	—N/a			Third round lost to (Croatia) Donna Vekić; 6–7^{(7–9)}, 2–6
6 August 2024 – 12 August 2024	Canadian Open	Canada	WTA 1000	Hard	QF	190	120	Third round lost to Diana Shnaider; 4–6, 1–6
13 August 2024 – 19 August 2024	Cincinnati Open	United States	WTA 1000	Hard	W	1000	10	Second round lost to (Kazakhstan) Yulia Putintseva; 4–6, 6–2, 4–6
26 August 2024 – 8 September 2024	US Open	United States	Grand Slam	Hard	W	2000	240	Fourth round lost to (United States) Emma Navarro; 3–6, 6–4, 3–6
25 September2024 – 6 October 2024	China Open	China	WTA 1000	Hard	SF	390	1000	Winner defeated (Czech Republic) Karolína Muchová; 6–1, 6–3
7 October 2024 – 13 October 2024	Wuhan Open	China	WTA 1000	Hard	NH	—	390	Semifinal lost to Aryna Sabalenka; 6–1, 4–6, 4–6
2 November 2024 – 9 November 2024	WTA Finals	Saudi Arabia	WTA Finals	Hard	SF	625	1300	Winner defeated (China) Zheng Qinwen; 3–6, 6–4, 7–6^{(7–2)}
Total year-end points						6115	6530	▲415 (difference)

== Yearly records ==
=== Head-to-head match-ups ===
Gauff has a 60–21 (74%) WTA match win–loss record in the 2024 season. Her record against players who were part of the WTA rankings top ten at the time of their meetings is 7–6 (54%). Bold indicates player was ranked top 10 at the time of at least one meeting. The following list is ordered by number of wins:

- **(Tunisia) Ons Jabeur** 2–0
- (Poland) Magdalena Fręch 2–0
- (Ukraine) Dayana Yastremska 2–0
- (Italy) Elisabetta Cocciaretto 2–0
- (United States) Caroline Dolehide 2–0
- (France) Varvara Gracheva 2–0
- (Ukraine) Elina Svitolina 2–0
- (France) Clara Burel 2–0
- (Spain) Paula Badosa 2–0
- **(China) Zheng Qinwen** 2–0
- (Ukraine) Marta Kostyuk 2–1
- (United States) Claire Liu 1–0
- (Czech Republic) Brenda Fruhvirtová 1–0
- (Slovakia) Anna Karolína Schmiedlová 1–0
- (United States) Alycia Parks 1–0
- (Czech Republic) Karolína Plíšková 1–0
- (Italy) Lucia Bronzetti 1–0
- (Belgium) Elise Mertens 1–0
- (China) Yuan Yue 1–0
- (Argentina) Nadia Podoroska 1–0
- (France) Océane Dodin 1–0
- (United States) Sachia Vickery 1–0
- (Netherlands) Arantxa Rus 1–0
- (Romania) Jaqueline Cristian 1–0
- Julia Avdeeva 1–0
- (Slovenia) Tamara Zidanšek 1–0
- Ekaterina Alexandrova 1–0
- (Romania) Anca Todoni 1–0
- (United Kingdom) Sonay Kartal 1–0
- (Australia) Ajla Tomljanović 1–0
- (Argentina) María Lourdes Carlé 1–0
- (China) Wang Yafan 1–0
- (Germany) Tatjana Maria 1–0
- (United Kingdom) Katie Boulter 1–0
- (Japan) Naomi Osaka 1–0
- (Ukraine) Yuliia Starodubtseva 1–0
- (Czech Republic) Karolína Muchová 1–0
- (Bulgaria) Viktoriya Tomova 1–0
- (Poland) Magda Linette 1–0
- **(United States) Jessica Pegula** 1–1
- (United States) Emma Navarro 1–2
- **(Poland) Iga Świątek** 1–2
- **Aryna Sabalenka** 1–2
- (Czech Republic) Kateřina Siniaková 0–1
- Anna Kalinskaya 0–1
- **(Greece) Maria Sakkari** 0–1
- (France) Caroline Garcia 0–1
- (United States) Madison Keys 0–1
- Diana Shnaider 0–1
- (Kazakhstan) Yulia Putintseva 0–1
- (Czech Republic) Barbora Krejčíková 0–1
- (Croatia) Donna Vekić 0–2

=== Top 10 record ===
Result	W–L	Opponent	Rk	Tournament	Surface	Rd	Score	Rk	Ref
Loss	0–1	Aryna Sabalenka	2	Australian Open, Australia	Hard	SF	6–7^{(2–7)}, 2–6	4	
Loss	0–2	(Greece) Maria Sakkari	9	Indian Wells Open, USA	Hard	SF	4–6, 7–6^{(7–5)}, 2–6	3	
Win	1–2	(China) Zheng Qinwen	7	Italian Open, Italy	Clay	QF	7–6^{(7–4)}, 6–1	3	
Loss	1–3	(Poland) Iga Świątek	1	Italian Open, Italy	Clay	SF	4–6, 3–6	3	
Win	2–3	(Tunisia) Ons Jabeur	9	French Open, France	Clay	QF	4–6, 6–2, 6–3	3	
Loss	2–4	(Poland) Iga Świątek	1	French Open, France	Clay	SF	2–6, 4–6	3	
Win	3–4	(Tunisia) Ons Jabeur	10	Berlin Open, Germany	Grass	QF	7–6^{(11–9)}, ret.	2	
Loss	3–5	(United States) Jessica Pegula	5	Berlin Open, Germany	Grass	SF	5–7, 6–7^{(2–7)}	2	
Loss	3–6	Aryna Sabalenka	2	Wuhan Open, China	Hard	SF	6–1, 4–6, 4–6	4	
Win	4–6	(United States) Jessica Pegula	6	WTA Finals, Saudi Arabia	Hard (i)	RR	6–3, 6–2	3	
Win	5–6	(Poland) Iga Świątek	2	WTA Finals, Saudi Arabia	Hard (i)	RR	6–3, 6–4	3	
Win	6–6	Aryna Sabalenka	1	WTA Finals, Saudi Arabia	Hard (i)	SF	7–6^{(7–4)}, 6–4	3	
Win	7–6	(China) Zheng Qinwen	6	WTA Finals, Saudi Arabia	Hard (i)	F	3–6, 6–4, 7–6^{(7–2)}	3	

- Key: (Rk) first use, opponent rank; (Rd) round; (Rk) 2nd use, player rank; (Ref) reference; (F) final; (SF) semifinal; (QF) quarterfinal; (#R) rounds 4, 3, 2, 1; (RR) round-robin stage; (Q#) qualifying rounds or stages (3), 2, 1.

=== Finals ===
==== Singles: 3 (3 titles) ====
Legend WTA Finals (1–0) WTA 1000 (1–0) WTA 250 (1–0)	Finals by surface Hard (3–0)

Result	W–L	Date	Tournament	Tier	Surface	Opponent	Score
Win	1–0	Jan 2024	Auckland Classic, New Zealand	WTA 250	Hard	(Ukraine) Elina Svitolina	6–7^{(4–7)}, 6–3, 6–3
Win	2–0	Oct 2024	China Open, China	WTA 1000	Hard	(Czech Republic) Karolína Muchová	6–1, 6–3
Win	3–0	Nov 2024	WTA Finals, Saudi Arabia	Finals	Hard (i)	(China) Zheng Qinwen	3–6, 6–4, 7–6^{(7–2)}

==== Doubles: 2 (1 title, 1 runner-up) ====
Legend Grand Slam tournaments (1–0) WTA 1000 (0–1)	Finals by surface Clay (1–1)

Result	W–L	Date	Tournament	Tier	Surface	Partner	Opponents	Score
Loss	0–1	May 2024	Italian Open, Italy	WTA 1000	Clay	(New Zealand) Erin Routliffe	(Italy) Sara Errani (Italy) Jasmine Paolini	3–6, 6–4, [8–10]
Win	1–1	Jun 2024	French Open, France	Grand Slam	Clay	(Czech Republic) Kateřina Siniaková	(Italy) Sara Errani (Italy) Jasmine Paolini	7–6^{(7–5)}, 6–3

=== Earnings ===
- **Bold** font denotes tournament win

**Singles**
Event	Prize money	Year-to-date
**WTA Auckland Open**	**$35,250**	$35,250
Australian Open	A$990,000	$690,024
Qatar Open	$20,650	$710,674
Dubai Tennis Championships	$72,965	$783,639
Indian Wells Open	$325,000	$1,108,639
Miami Open	$101,000	$1,205,389
Stuttgart Open	$23,435	$1,232,074
Madrid Open	€88,440	$1,320,514
Italian Open	€192,405	$1,412,919
French Open	€650,000	$2,062,919
Berlin Ladies Open	€44,525	$2,107,444
Wimbledon Championships	€226,000	$2,333,444
Canadian Open	$36,454	$2,369,898
Cincinnati Open	$20,650	$2,390,548
US Open	$325,000	$2,715,548
**China Open**	**$1,100,000**	$3,815,548
Wuhan Open	$159,439	$3,974,987
**WTA Finals**	**$4,805,000**	$8,779,987
		$8,779,987
**Doubles**
Event	Prize money	Year-to-date
Indian Wells Open	$31,800	$31,800
Miami Open	$9,320	$41,120
Madrid Open	€27,845	$68,965
Italian Open	€64,660	$133,625
**French Open**	**€295,000**	$428,625
Berlin Ladies Open	€2,235	$430,860
Wimbledon Championships	€42,000	$472,860
		$472,860
**Total**
		**$9,353,847**

Figures in United States dollars (USD) unless noted.

== See also ==
- 2024 Iga Świątek tennis season
- 2024 Aryna Sabalenka tennis season
- 2024 Elena Rybakina tennis season
