= 2025 Berlin Tennis Open – Doubles =

Doubles
- 2025 Berlin Tennis Open

Final
- Champions: (Slovakia) Tereza Mihalíková (United Kingdom) Olivia Nicholls
- Runners-up: (Italy) Sara Errani (Italy) Jasmine Paolini
- Score: 4−6, 6−2, [10−6]

Events
Singles	Doubles
← 2024 ·	German Open (WTA)	· 2026 →

Tereza Mihalíková and Olivia Nicholls won the doubles title at the 2025 Berlin Tennis Open, defeating Sara Errani and Jasmine Paolini in the final, 4−6, 6−2, [10−6].

Wang Xinyu and Zheng Saisai were the reigning champions, but did not participate this year.

== Seeds ==
1. (Italy) Sara Errani / (Italy) Jasmine Paolini (final)
2. (Ukraine) Lyudmyla Kichenok / (New Zealand) Erin Routliffe (quarterfinals)
3. Mirra Andreeva / Diana Shnaider (first round)
4. (United States) Asia Muhammad / (Netherlands) Demi Schuurs (semifinals)

== Draw ==
=== Key ===
- Q = Qualifier
- WC = Wild card
- LL = Lucky loser
- Alt = Alternate
- ITF = ITF entry
- PR = Protected ranking
- SR = Special ranking
- SE = Special exempt
- JE = Junior exempt
- JR = Junior Accelerator Programme entrant
- CO = College Accelerator Programme entrant
- NG = Next Gen Accelerator Program entrant
- w/o = Walkover
- r = Retired
- d = Defaulted

=== Draw ===
First round
1	(Italy) S Errani (Italy) J Paolini	6	6
WC	(Ukraine) M Kostyuk (Germany) E Lys	2	2
(United States) A Krueger (United States) J Pegula	6	6
(Australia) D Kasatkina (Croatia) D Vekić	4	4
3	M Andreeva; D Shnaider	6	4	[5]
(Hungary) T Babos (Brazil) L Stefani	4	6	[10]
PR	(Australia) S Hunter (United States) D Krawczyk	2	6	[8]
WC	(Spain) P Badosa (Tunisia) O Jabeur	6	0	[10]
(United States) C Dolehide (United States) S Kenin	6	7^{7}
(Czech Republic) K Siniaková (Czech Republic) M Vondroušová	3	6^{4}
(Mexico) G Olmos; A Panova	7^{7}	1	[3]
4	(United States) A Muhammad (Netherlands) D Schuurs	6^{5}	6	[10]
(China) X Jiang (Chinese Taipei) F-h Wu	2	5
(Slovakia) T Mihalíková (United Kingdom) O Nicholls	6	7
(Chinese Taipei) H-c Chan (Australia) E Perez	6^{6}	4
2	(Ukraine) L Kichenok (New Zealand) E Routliffe	7^{8}	6

Quarterfinals
1	(Italy) S Errani (Italy) J Paolini	5	6	[10]
(United States) A Krueger (United States) J Pegula	7	1	[6]
(Hungary) T Babos (Brazil) L Stefani	3	2
WC	(Spain) P Badosa (Tunisia) O Jabeur	6	6
(United States) C Dolehide (United States) S Kenin
4	(United States) A Muhammad (Netherlands) D Schuurs	w/o
(Slovakia) T Mihalíková (United Kingdom) O Nicholls	6	6
2	(Ukraine) L Kichenok (New Zealand) E Routliffe	4	0

Semifinals
1	(Italy) S Errani (Italy) J Paolini	w/o
WC	(Spain) P Badosa (Tunisia) O Jabeur
4	(United States) A Muhammad (Netherlands) D Schuurs	2	3
(Slovakia) T Mihalíková (United Kingdom) O Nicholls	6	6

Final
1	(Italy) S Errani (Italy) J Paolini	6	2	[6]
(Slovakia) T Mihalíková (United Kingdom) O Nicholls	4	6	[10]
