= 2024 Berlin Ladies Open – Doubles =

Doubles
- 2024 Berlin Ladies Open

Final
- Champions: (China) Wang Xinyu (China) Zheng Saisai
- Runners-up: (Chinese Taipei) Chan Hao-ching; Veronika Kudermetova
- Score: 6–2, 7–5

Events
Singles	Doubles
← 2023 ·	German Open (WTA)	· 2025 →

Wang Xinyu and Zheng Saisai won the doubles title at the 2024 Berlin Ladies Open, defeating Chan Hao-ching and Veronika Kudermetova in the final, 6–2, 7–5.

Caroline Garcia and Luisa Stefani were the defending champions, but Garcia did not participate this year. Stefani partnered Demi Schuurs, but lost in the semifinals to Wang and Zheng.

== Seeds ==
1. (United States) Nicole Melichar-Martinez / (Australia) Ellen Perez (quarterfinals)
2. (Netherlands) Demi Schuurs / (Brazil) Luisa Stefani (semifinals)
3. (Ukraine) Lyudmyla Kichenok / (Ukraine) Nadiia Kichenok (quarterfinals)
4. (United States) Coco Gauff / (United States) Jessica Pegula (first round)

== Draw ==
=== Key ===
- Q = Qualifier
- WC = Wild card
- LL = Lucky loser
- Alt = Alternate
- ITF = ITF entry
- PR = Protected ranking
- SR = Special ranking
- SE = Special exempt
- JE = Junior exempt
- JR = Junior Accelerator Programme entrant
- CO = College Accelerator Programme entrant
- NG = Next Gen Accelerator Program entrant
- w/o = Walkover
- r = Retired
- d = Defaulted

=== Draw ===
First round
1	(United States) N Melichar-Martinez (Australia) E Perez	4	6	[11]
(Japan) S Aoyama (Chinese Taipei) F-h Wu	6	0	[9]
(Mexico) G Olmos; A Panova	1	4
(Chinese Taipei) H-c Chan; V Kudermetova	6	6
4	(United States) C Gauff (United States) J Pegula	4	0
(Czech Republic) L Nosková (Czech Republic) K Siniaková	6	6
WC	V Azarenka (Spain) P Badosa	6	6
E Alexandrova; I Khromacheva	3	4
PR	(China) Xin Wang (China) S Zheng	6^{5}	7^{7}	[10]
(Brazil) B Haddad Maia (Brazil) I Martins	7^{7}	6^{5}	[5]
(Norway) U Eikeri (Estonia) I Neel	6^{3}	4
3	(Ukraine) L Kichenok (Ukraine) N Kichenok	7^{7}	6
(Japan) E Hozumi (Japan) M Ninomiya	6	4	[6]
WC	(Germany) J Niemeier (Germany) N Noha Akugue	4	6	[10]
(United States) D Krawczyk (Czech Republic) M Vondroušová	3	4
2	(Netherlands) D Schuurs (Brazil) L Stefani	6	6

Quarterfinals
1	(United States) N Melichar-Martinez (Australia) E Perez	7^{7}	3	[8]
(Chinese Taipei) H-c Chan; V Kudermetova	6^{5}	6	[10]
(Czech Republic) L Nosková (Czech Republic) K Siniaková	w/o
WC	V Azarenka (Spain) P Badosa
PR	(China) Xin Wang (China) S Zheng	7^{8}	7^{8}
3	(Ukraine) L Kichenok (Ukraine) N Kichenok	6^{6}	6^{6}
WC	(Germany) J Niemeier (Germany) N Noha Akugue	2	4
2	(Netherlands) D Schuurs (Brazil) L Stefani	6	6

Semifinals
(Chinese Taipei) H-c Chan; V Kudermetova	6	6
(Czech Republic) L Nosková (Czech Republic) K Siniaková	4	3
PR	(China) Xin Wang (China) S Zheng	6	7^{7}
2	(Netherlands) D Schuurs (Brazil) L Stefani	4	6^{4}

Final
(Chinese Taipei) H-c Chan; V Kudermetova	2	5
PR	(China) Xin Wang (China) S Zheng	6	7
