= 2019 Ladies Open Lugano =

- Date: 8 – 14 April
- Edition: 3rd
- Category: WTA International tournaments
- Draw: 32S / 16D
- Prize money: $250,000
- Surface: Clay
- Location: Lugano, Switzerland
- Venue: Tennis Club Lido Lugano

Champions

Singles
- (Slovenia) Polona Hercog

Doubles
- (Romania) Sorana Cîrstea / (Romania) Andreea Mitu
← 2018 ·	Ladies Open Lugano	· 2020 →

The 2019 Ladies Open Lugano (also known as the 2019 Samsung Open presented by Cornèr for sponsorship reasons) was a women's tennis tournament played on clay courts at TC Lido Lugano. It was the third edition of the tournament and part of the International category of the 2019 WTA Tour. It took place between 8 April through 14 April 2019.

== Points and prize money ==
=== Point distribution ===
Event	W	F	SF	QF	Round of 16	Round of 32	Q	Q2	Q1
Women's singles	280	180	110	60	30	1	18	12	1
Women's doubles	280	180	110	60	1	—	—	—	—

=== Prize money ===
Event	W	F	SF	QF	Round of 16	Round of 32	Q2	Q1
Women's singles	$43,000	$21,400	$11,500	$6,175	$3,400	$2,100	$1,020	$600
Women's doubles	$12,300	$6,400	$3,435	$1,820	$960	—	—	—

== Singles main draw entrants ==
=== Seeds ===
Country	Player	Rank^{1}	Seed
SUI	Belinda Bencic	21	1
ESP	Carla Suárez Navarro	27	2
SVK	Viktória Kužmová	44	3
BEL	Alison Van Uytvanck	52	4
FRA	Pauline Parmentier	54	5
RUS	Ekaterina Alexandrova	56	6
SWE	Rebecca Peterson	60	7
BLR	Vera Lapko	65	8

- ^{1} Rankings are as of 1 April 2019.

=== Other entrants ===
The following players received wildcards into the main draw:

- (Switzerland) Ylena In-Albon
- (Russia) Svetlana Kuznetsova
- (Switzerland) Jil Teichmann

The following players received entry from the qualifying draw:

- (Poland) Magdalena Fręch
- (Italy) Giulia Gatto-Monticone
- (Hungary) Réka Luca Jani
- (Germany) Antonia Lottner
- (Denmark) Clara Tauson
- (Ukraine) Katarina Zavatska

=== Withdrawals ===
- (Slovakia) Dominika Cibulková → replaced by (Czech Republic) Kristýna Plíšková
- (France) Alizé Cornet → replaced by (Switzerland) Viktorija Golubic
- (Belgium) Kirsten Flipkens → replaced by (Switzerland) Timea Bacsinszky
- (Germany) Anna-Lena Friedsam → replaced by (Germany) Tamara Korpatsch
- (Italy) Camila Giorgi → replaced by (Czech Republic) Tereza Smitková
- (Estonia) Anett Kontaveit → replaced by (Luxembourg) Mandy Minella
- (France) Kristina Mladenovic → replaced by (Netherlands) Arantxa Rus
- (Germany) Andrea Petkovic → replaced by (Romania) Sorana Cîrstea
- (Kazakhstan) Yulia Putintseva → replaced by (France) Fiona Ferro
- (Czech Republic) Markéta Vondroušová → replaced by (Germany) Mona Barthel

== Doubles main draw entrants ==
=== Seeds ===
Country	Player	Country	Player	Rank^{1}	Seed
RUS	Veronika Kudermetova	KAZ	Galina Voskoboeva	114	1
SWE	Cornelia Lister	CZE	Renata Voráčová	171	2
ROU	Sorana Cîrstea	ROU	Andreea Mitu	216	3
SUI	Belinda Bencic	SVK	Viktória Kužmová	229	4

- ^{1} Rankings are as of 1 April 2019.

=== Other entrants ===
The following pairs received wildcards into the main draw:

- (Switzerland) Timea Bacsinszky / (Switzerland) Ylena In-Albon
- (Switzerland) Leonie Küng / (Denmark) Clara Tauson

=== Withdrawals ===
- (Switzerland) Viktorija Golubic (left leg injury)

== Champions ==
=== Singles ===
- (Slovenia) Polona Hercog def. (Poland) Iga Świątek 6–3, 3–6, 6–3

=== Doubles ===
- (Romania) Sorana Cîrstea / (Romania) Andreea Mitu def. (Russia) Veronika Kudermetova / (Kazakhstan) Galina Voskoboeva, 1–6, 6–2, [10–8]
