= 2017 Ladies Open Biel Bienne =

- Date: 10 – 16 April
- Edition: 1st
- Category: WTA International tournaments
- Draw: 32S / 16D
- Prize money: $250,000
- Surface: Hard (i)
- Location: Biel/Bienne, Switzerland
- Venue: Swiss Tennis Center

Champions

Singles
- (Czech Republic) Markéta Vondroušová

Doubles
- (Chinese Taipei) Hsieh Su-wei / (Romania) Monica Niculescu
Ladies Open Biel Bienne	· 2018 →

The 2017 Ladies Open Biel Bienne was a women's tennis tournament played on indoor hard courts. It was the first edition of the Ladies Open Biel Bienne and part of the International category of the 2017 WTA Tour. It took place at the Swiss Tennis Center in Roger Federer Allee, Biel/Bienne, Switzerland, from 10 April through 16 April 2017.

== Points and prize money ==
=== Point distribution ===
Event	W	F	SF	QF	Round of 16	Round of 32	Q	Q3	Q2	Q1
Women's singles	280	180	110	60	30	1	18	14	10	1
Women's doubles	280	180	110	60	1	—	—	—	—	—

=== Prize money ===
Event	W	F	SF	QF	Round of 16	Round of 32	Q2	Q1
Women's singles	$43,000	$21,400	$11,500	$6,175	$3,400	$2,100	$1,020	$600
Women's doubles	$12,300	$6,400	$3,435	$1,820	$960	—	—	—

== Singles main draw entrants ==
=== Seeds ===
Country	Player	Rank^{1}	Seed
CZE	Barbora Strýcová	18	1
ESP	Carla Suárez Navarro	25	2
HUN	Tímea Babos	30	3
ITA	Roberta Vinci	34	4
GER	Laura Siegemund	37	5
~~FRA~~	~~Alizé Cornet~~	~~44~~	~~6~~
GER	Julia Görges	46	7
ROU	Monica Niculescu	47	8

- ^{1} Rankings are as of 3 April 2017.

=== Other entrants ===
The following players received wildcards into the main draw:

- (Switzerland) Belinda Bencic
- (Switzerland) Rebeka Masarova
- (Spain) Carla Suárez Navarro

The following players received entry from the qualifying draw:

- (Czech Republic) Marie Bouzková
- (Germany) Antonia Lottner
- (Belarus) Aliaksandra Sasnovich
- (Czech Republic) Markéta Vondroušová

The following player received entry as a lucky loser:

- (North Macedonia) Lina Gjorcheska

=== Withdrawals ===
Before the tournament

- (France) Alizé Cornet →replaced by (North Macedonia) Lina Gjorcheska
- (Belgium) Kirsten Flipkens →replaced by (Germany) Mona Barthel
- (France) Kristina Mladenovic →replaced by (United States) Julia Boserup
- (Bulgaria) Tsvetana Pironkova →replaced by (Chinese Taipei) Hsieh Su-wei
- (Kazakhstan) Yaroslava Shvedova →replaced by (Slovakia) Jana Čepelová

== Doubles main draw entrants ==
=== Seeds ===
Country	Player	Country	Player	Rank^{1}	Seed
SUI	Xenia Knoll	NED	Demi Schuurs	99	1
TPE	Hsieh Su-wei	ROU	Monica Niculescu	102	2
ROU	Raluca Olaru	UKR	Olga Savchuk	104	3
~~BEL~~	~~Elise Mertens~~	~~GBR~~	~~Heather Watson~~	~~156~~	~~4~~

- ^{1} Rankings are as of 3 April 2017.

=== Other entrants ===
The following pairs received wildcards into the main draw:

- (France) Amandine Hesse / (Switzerland) Rebeka Masarova
- (Switzerland) Ylena In-Albon / (Switzerland) Leonie Küng

== Champions ==
=== Singles ===
- (Czech Republic) Markéta Vondroušová def. (Estonia) Anett Kontaveit, 6–4, 7–6^{(8–6)}

=== Doubles ===
- (Chinese Taipei) Hsieh Su-wei / (Romania) Monica Niculescu def. (Switzerland) Timea Bacsinszky / (Switzerland) Martina Hingis, 5–7, 6–3, [10–7]
