= 2025 Berlin Tennis Open =

- Date: 16–22 June
- Edition: 102nd
- Category: WTA 500
- Draw: 28S / 24Q / 16D
- Prize money: €925,661
- Surface: Grass
- Location: Berlin, Germany
- Venue: Rot-Weiss Tennis Club

Champions

Singles
- (Czech Republic) Markéta Vondroušová

Doubles
- (Slovakia) Tereza Mihalíková / (United Kingdom) Olivia Nicholls
- German Open (WTA)

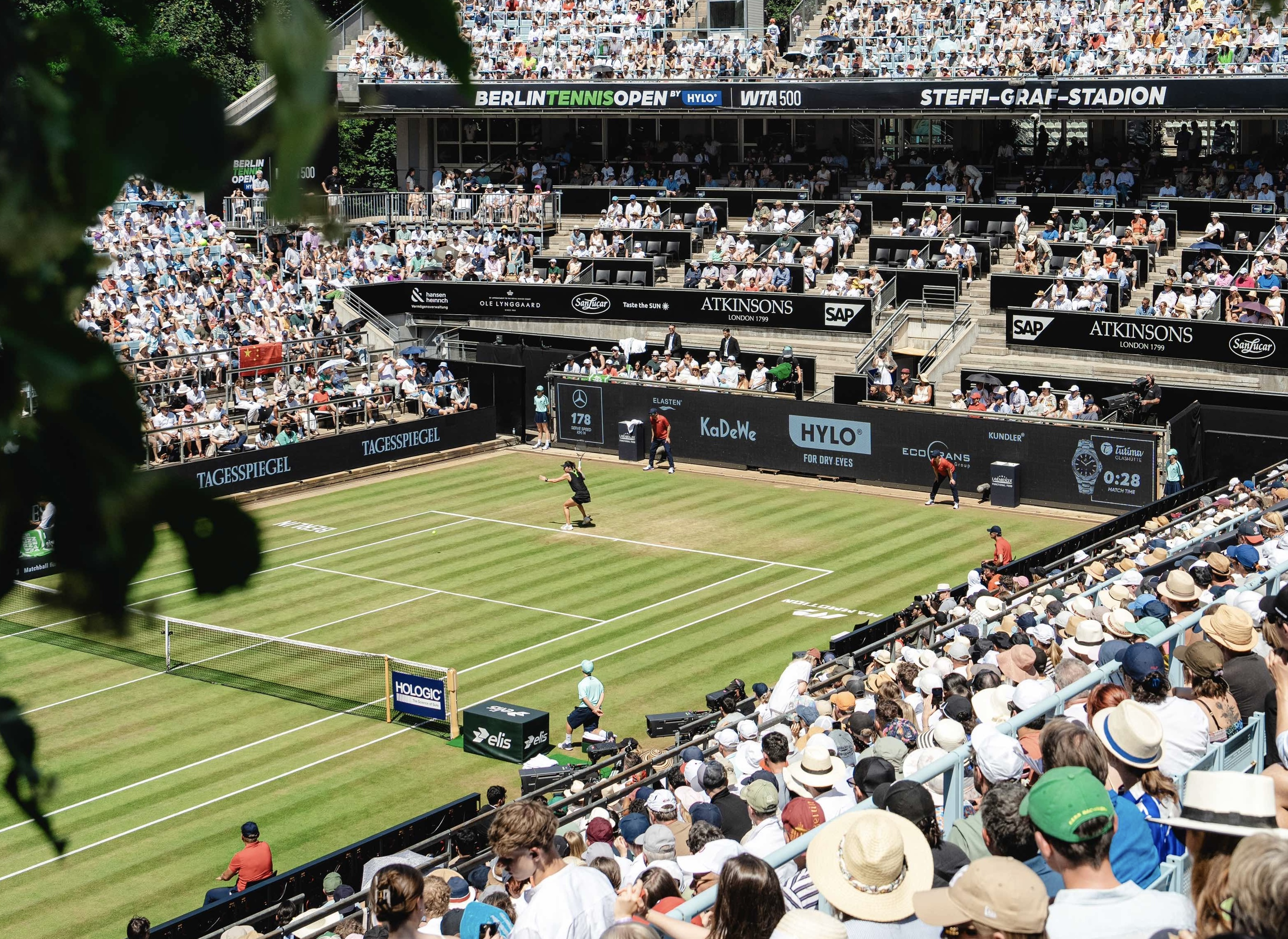

The 2025 Berlin Tennis Open by Hylo was a professional women's tennis tournament played on outdoor grass courts at the Rot-Weiss Tennis Club in Berlin, Germany from 16 June to 22 June 2025. It was the 102nd edition of the WTA German Open classed as a WTA 500 on the 2025 WTA Tour.

== Champions ==
=== Singles ===
- (Czech Republic) Markéta Vondroušová def. (China) Wang Xinyu, 7–6^{(12–10)}, 4–6, 6–2

=== Doubles ===
- (Slovakia) Tereza Mihalíková / (United Kingdom) Olivia Nicholls def. (Italy) Sara Errani / (Italy) Jasmine Paolini, 4−6, 6−2, [10−6]

== Singles main-draw entrants ==
=== Seeds ===
Country	Player	Rank	Seed
	Aryna Sabalenka	1	1
USA	Coco Gauff	2	2
USA	Jessica Pegula	3	3
ITA	Jasmine Paolini	4	4
~~CHN~~	~~Zheng Qinwen~~	~~5~~	~~5~~
	Mirra Andreeva	6	6
USA	Madison Keys	8	7
ESP	Paula Badosa	9	8

- Rankings are as of 9 June 2025.

=== Other entrants ===
The following players received wildcards into the singles main draw:

- (Germany) Eva Lys
- (Japan) Naomi Osaka
- (Canada) Bianca Andreescu

The following player received entry using a protected ranking:

- (Czech Republic) Markéta Vondroušová

The following players received entry from the qualifying draw:

- (United States) Caroline Dolehide
- (United States) Sofia Kenin
- (Switzerland) Rebeka Masarova
- (Czech Republic) Kateřina Siniaková
- (Bulgaria) Viktoriya Tomova
- (China) Wang Xinyu

The following players received entry as lucky losers:

- (Tunisia) Ons Jabeur
- (United States) Ashlyn Krueger

=== Withdrawals ===
- (Switzerland) Belinda Bencic → replaced by (Poland) Magdalena Fręch
- (Czech Republic) Karolína Muchová → replaced by (Ukraine) Marta Kostyuk
- (United Kingdom) Emma Raducanu → replaced by (Canada) Bianca Andreescu
- (Ukraine) Elina Svitolina → replaced by Liudmila Samsonova
- (China) Zheng Qinwen → replaced by (United States) Ashlyn Krueger

== Doubles main draw entrants ==
=== Seeds ===
Country	Player	Country	Player	Rank	Seed
ITA	Sara Errani	ITA	Jasmine Paolini	12	1
UKR	Lyudmyla Kichenok	NZL	Erin Routliffe	16	2
	Mirra Andreeva		Diana Shnaider	24	3
USA	Asia Muhammad	NED	Demi Schuurs	32	4

- Rankings are as of 9 June 2025.

=== Other entrants ===
The following pairs received wildcards into the doubles main draw:

- (Spain) Paula Badosa / (Tunisia) Ons Jabeur
- (Ukraine) Marta Kostyuk / (Germany) Eva Lys
