= 2025 Berlin Tennis Open – Singles =

Singles
- 2025 Berlin Tennis Open

Final
- Champion: (Czech Republic) Markéta Vondroušová
- Runner-up: (China) Wang Xinyu
- Score: 7–6^{(12–10)}, 4–6, 6–2

Details
- Draw: 28 (6 Q / 4 WC )
- Seeds: 8

Events
Singles	Doubles
← 2024 ·	German Open (WTA)	· 2026 →

Markéta Vondroušová defeated Wang Xinyu in the final, 7–6^{(12–10)}, 4–6, 6–2 to win the singles tennis title at the 2025 Berlin Tennis Open. It was her third career WTA Tour title, and first since winning the 2023 Wimbledon Championships. Ranked No. 164, Vondroušová was the lowest-ranked champion in the tournament's history.

Jessica Pegula was the defending champion, but lost in the second round to Liudmila Samsonova, who saved two match points.

== Seeds ==
The top four seeds received a bye into the second round.

1. Aryna Sabalenka (semifinals)
2. (United States) Coco Gauff (second round)
3. (United States) Jessica Pegula (second round)
4. (Italy) Jasmine Paolini (second round)
5. (China) Zheng Qinwen (withdrew)
6. Mirra Andreeva (first round)
7. (United States) Madison Keys (first round)
8. (Spain) Paula Badosa (quarterfinals, retired)

== Draw ==
=== Key ===
- Q = Qualifier
- WC = Wild card
- LL = Lucky loser
- Alt = Alternate
- ITF = ITF entry
- PR = Protected ranking
- SR = Special ranking
- SE = Special exempt
- JE = Junior exempt
- JR = Junior Accelerator Programme entrant
- CO = College Accelerator Programme entrant
- NG = Next Gen Accelerator Program entrant
- w/o = Walkover
- r = Retired
- d = Defaulted

=== Finals ===
Semifinals
1	Aryna Sabalenka	2	4
PR	(Czech Republic) Markéta Vondroušová	6	6
Liudmila Samsonova	4	1
Q	(China) Wang Xinyu	6	6

Final
PR	(Czech Republic) Markéta Vondroušová	7^{12}	4	6
Q	(China) Wang Xinyu	6^{10}	6	2

=== Top half ===
First round
Q	(United States) S Kenin	3	2
Q	(Switzerland) R Masarova	6	6
Q	(Bulgaria) V Tomova	1	2
Q	(Czech Republic) K Siniaková	6	6
(Kazakhstan) E Rybakina	6	7^{7}
LL	(United States) A Krueger	3	6^{3}
Q	(United States) C Dolehide	6^{5}	1
LL	(Tunisia) O Jabeur	7^{7}	6
D Shnaider	6	6
(Croatia) D Vekić	2	4
PR	(Czech Republic) M Vondroušová	7	7^{8}
7	(United States) M Keys	5	6^{6}

Second round
1	A Sabalenka	6	7^{8}
Q	(Switzerland) R Masarova	2	6^{6}
Q	(Czech Republic) K Siniaková	4	6^{5}
(Kazakhstan) E Rybakina	6	7^{7}
4	(Italy) J Paolini	1	3
LL	(Tunisia) O Jabeur	6	6
D Shnaider	3	7^{7}	3
PR	(Czech Republic) M Vondroušová	6	6^{3}	6

Quarterfinals
1	A Sabalenka	7^{8}	3	7^{8}
(Kazakhstan) E Rybakina	6^{6}	6	6^{6}
LL	(Tunisia) O Jabeur	4	1
PR	(Czech Republic) M Vondroušová	6	6

Semifinals
1	A Sabalenka	2	4
PR	(Czech Republic) M Vondroušová	6	6

=== Bottom half ===
First round
6	M Andreeva	6	5	0
(Poland) M Fręch	2	7	6
(United States) A Anisimova	6	6
WC	(Canada) B Andreescu	4	3
WC	(Japan) N Osaka	6	6^{3}	4
L Samsonova	3	7^{7}	6
8	(Spain) P Badosa	6	6
WC	(Germany) E Lys	1	3
(Ukraine) M Kostyuk	2	3
(United States) E Navarro	6	6
Q	(China) Xin Wang	6	6
(Australia) D Kasatkina	3	2

Second round
(Poland) M Fręch	2	6	3
(United States) A Anisimova	6	4	6
L Samsonova	6^{8}	7	7^{7}
3	(United States) J Pegula	7^{10}	5	6^{5}
8	(Spain) P Badosa	7^{7}	6
(United States) E Navarro	6^{2}	3
Q	(China) Xin Wang	6	6
2	(United States) C Gauff	3	3

Quarterfinals
(United States) A Anisimova	1	1
L Samsonova	6	6
8	(Spain) P Badosa	1	0^{r}
Q	(China) Xin Wang	6	0

Semifinals
L Samsonova	4	1
Q	(China) Xin Wang	6	6

== Qualifying ==
=== Seeds ===
1. Anna Kalinskaya (first round)
2. (United States) Sofia Kenin (qualified)
3. (United States) Ashlyn Krueger (qualifying competition, lucky loser)
4. Anastasia Potapova (qualifying competition, withdrew)
5. (China) Wang Xinyu (qualified)
6. (United States) Ann Li (withdrew)
7. (Tunisia) Ons Jabeur (qualifying competition, lucky loser)
8. (United States) Caroline Dolehide (qualified)
9. (Australia) Ajla Tomljanović (qualifying competition)
10. (Czech Republic) Kateřina Siniaková (qualified)
11. (Bulgaria) Viktoriya Tomova (qualified)
12. (Greece) Maria Sakkari (first round)

=== Qualifiers ===
1. (Switzerland) Rebeka Masarova
2. (United States) Sofia Kenin
3. (Czech Republic) Kateřina Siniaková
4. (United States) Caroline Dolehide
5. (China) Wang Xinyu
6. (Bulgaria) Viktoriya Tomova

=== Lucky losers ===
1. (Tunisia) Ons Jabeur
2. (United States) Ashlyn Krueger

=== Qualifying draw ===
==== First qualifier ====
First round
1	Anna Kalinskaya	6	4	6^{6}
(Germany) Ella Seidel	4	6	7^{8}
(Switzerland) Rebeka Masarova	7^{7}	7
12	(Greece) Maria Sakkari	6^{1}	5

Qualifying competition
(Germany) Ella Seidel	5	1
(Switzerland) Rebeka Masarova	7	6

==== Second qualifier ====
First round
2	(United States) Sofia Kenin	6	6
Erika Andreeva	4	0
(France) Chloé Paquet	6	3	4
9	(Australia) Ajla Tomljanović	0	6	6

Qualifying competition
2	(United States) Sofia Kenin	5	6	7
9	(Australia) Ajla Tomljanović	7	4	5

==== Third qualifier ====
First round
3	(United States) Ashlyn Krueger	6	6
WC	(Germany) Anna-Lena Friedsam	3	0
WC	(Slovakia) Mia Pohánková	6^{5}	1
10	(Czech Republic) Kateřina Siniaková	7^{7}	6

Qualifying competition
3	(United States) Ashlyn Krueger	4	2
10	(Czech Republic) Kateřina Siniaková	6	6

==== Fourth qualifier ====
First round
4	Anastasia Potapova	6	6^{2}	6
WC	(Slovakia) Renáta Jamrichová	3	7^{7}	3
WC	(Germany) Sonja Zhenikhova	7^{9}	2	3
8	(United States) Caroline Dolehide	6^{7}	6	6

Qualifying competition
4	Anastasia Potapova
8	(United States) Caroline Dolehide	w/o

==== Fifth qualifier ====
First round
5	(China) Wang Xinyu	3	7^{7}	7
(Australia) Talia Gibson	6	6^{5}	5
(France) Elsa Jacquemot	6	5	6^{11}
7	(Tunisia) Ons Jabeur	4	7	7^{13}

Qualifying competition
5	(China) Wang Xinyu	6	3	6
7	(Tunisia) Ons Jabeur	1	6	0

==== Sixth qualifier ====
First round
Alt	(Poland) Katarzyna Kawa	6	6
(Hungary) Dalma Gálfi	4	3
(Australia) Priscilla Hon	7	6^{4}	6^{6}
11	(Bulgaria) Viktoriya Tomova	5	7^{7}	7^{8}

Qualifying competition
Alt	(Poland) Katarzyna Kawa	6	4	1
11	(Bulgaria) Viktoriya Tomova	2	6	6
