= Ladies Open Lugano =

Tournament information
- Founded: 2017 (as Ladies Open Biel Bienne)
- Location: Lugano; Switzerland
- Venue: Tennis Club Lido Lugano
- Category: WTA International
- Surface: Clay - outdoors
- Draw: 32S / 32Q / 16D
- Prize money: US$250,000 (2019)
- Website: samsungopen.ch

Current champions (2019)
- Women's singles: (Slovenia) Polona Hercog
- Women's doubles: (Romania) Sorana Cîrstea (Romania) Andreea Mitu

The inaugural edition of the Ladies Open Lugano, formerly the Ladies Open Biel/Bienne, an International-level WTA tennis event, was held in April 2017 at the Swiss National Tennis Centre in Biel/Bienne, Switzerland. The new indoor arena was completed in February 2017.

The tournament lasted only one year in Biel/Bienne and was moved to Lugano in 2018. The surface was also changed from indoor hard to outdoor clay.

== Past finals ==
=== Singles ===
Year	Champion	Runner-up	Score
2017	(Czech Republic) Markéta Vondroušová	(Estonia) Anett Kontaveit	6–4, 7–6^{(8–6)}
↓ Changed from Indoor Hard to Clay Court ↓
2018	(Belgium) Elise Mertens	(Belarus) Aryna Sabalenka	7–5, 6–2
2019	(Slovenia) Polona Hercog	(Poland) Iga Świątek	6–3, 3–6, 6–3

=== Doubles ===
Year	Champions	Runners-up	Score
2017	(Chinese Taipei) Hsieh Su-wei (Romania) Monica Niculescu	(Switzerland) Timea Bacsinszky (Switzerland) Martina Hingis	5–7, 6–3, [10–7]
↓ Changed from Indoor Hard to Clay Court ↓
2018	(Belgium) Kirsten Flipkens (Belgium) Elise Mertens	(Belarus) Vera Lapko (Belarus) Aryna Sabalenka	6–1, 6–3
2019	(Romania) Sorana Cîrstea (Romania) Andreea Mitu	(Russia) Veronika Kudermetova (Kazakhstan) Galina Voskoboeva	1–6, 6–2, [10–8]

== See also ==
- Zurich Open – Swiss Indoor WTA tournament held between 1984 and 2008
