= 2017 Ladies Open Biel Bienne – Doubles =

Doubles
- 2017 Ladies Open Biel Bienne

Final
- Champions: (Chinese Taipei) Hsieh Su-wei (Romania) Monica Niculescu
- Runners-up: (Switzerland) Timea Bacsinszky (Switzerland) Martina Hingis
- Score: 5–7, 6–3, [10–7]

Events
Singles	Doubles
Ladies Open Biel Bienne	· 2018 →

This was the first edition of the tournament.

Hsieh Su-wei and Monica Niculescu won the title, defeating Timea Bacsinszky and Martina Hingis in the final, 5–7, 6–3, [10–7].

== Seeds ==
1. (Switzerland) Xenia Knoll / (Netherlands) Demi Schuurs (semifinals)
2. (Chinese Taipei) Hsieh Su-wei / (Romania) Monica Niculescu (champions)
3. (Romania) Raluca Olaru / (Ukraine) Olga Savchuk (quarterfinals)
4. (Belgium) Elise Mertens / (United Kingdom) Heather Watson (withdrew)

== Draw ==
=== Key ===
- Q = Qualifier
- WC = Wild card
- LL = Lucky loser
- Alt = Alternate
- SE = Special exempt
- PR = Protected ranking
- ITF = ITF entry
- JE = Junior exempt
- w/o = Walkover
- r = Retired
- d = Defaulted
- SR = Special ranking

First round
1	(Switzerland) X Knoll (Netherlands) D Schuurs	6	3	[10]
(United Kingdom) N Broady (Bulgaria) A Naydenova	4	6	[6]
(Netherlands) L Kerkhove (Belarus) L Marozava	3	6	[7]
(Germany) A Beck (Czech Republic) R Voráčová	6	3	[10]
4	(Belgium) E Mertens (United Kingdom) H Watson
(North Macedonia) L Gjorcheska (Russia) A Komardina	w/o
(Switzerland) T Bacsinszky (Switzerland) M Hingis	6	6
(Latvia) D Marcinkēviča (Germany) C Witthöft	2	3
(Switzerland) B Bencic (Switzerland) A Sadiković	1	4
(Switzerland) V Golubic (Czech Republic) Kr Plíšková	6	6
WC	(France) A Hesse (Switzerland) R Masarova	6	1	[6]
3	(Romania) R Olaru (Ukraine) O Savchuk	3	6	[10]
(Czech Republic) L Kunčíková (Sweden) C Lister	6	6
(United Kingdom) J Rae (United Kingdom) A Smith	3	4
WC	(Switzerland) Y In-Albon (Switzerland) L Küng	2	1
2	(Chinese Taipei) S-w Hsieh (Romania) M Niculescu	6	6

Quarterfinals
1	(Switzerland) X Knoll (Netherlands) D Schuurs	6	1	[12]
(Germany) A Beck (Czech Republic) R Voráčová	3	6	[10]
(North Macedonia) L Gjorcheska (Russia) A Komardina	4	0
(Switzerland) T Bacsinszky (Switzerland) M Hingis	6	6
(Switzerland) V Golubic (Czech Republic) Kr Plíšková	4	7^{7}	[11]
3	(Romania) R Olaru (Ukraine) O Savchuk	6	6^{3}	[9]
(Czech Republic) L Kunčíková (Sweden) C Lister	2	2
2	(Chinese Taipei) S-w Hsieh (Romania) M Niculescu	6	6

Semifinals
1	(Switzerland) X Knoll (Netherlands) D Schuurs	7	4	[3]
(Switzerland) T Bacsinszky (Switzerland) M Hingis	5	6	[10]
(Switzerland) V Golubic (Czech Republic) Kr Plíšková	2	4
2	(Chinese Taipei) S-w Hsieh (Romania) M Niculescu	6	6

Final
(Switzerland) T Bacsinszky (Switzerland) M Hingis	7	3	[7]
2	(Chinese Taipei) S-w Hsieh (Romania) M Niculescu	5	6	[10]
