= 2019 Ladies Open Lugano – Singles =

Singles
- 2019 Ladies Open Lugano

Final
- Champion: (Slovenia) Polona Hercog
- Runner-up: (Poland) Iga Świątek
- Score: 6–3, 3–6, 6–3

Events
Singles	Doubles
- Ladies Open Lugano

Polona Hercog defeated Iga Świątek in the final, 6–3, 3–6, 6–3 to win the women's singles tennis title at the 2019 Ladies Lugano Open. It was Świątek's first WTA Tour final.

Elise Mertens was the reigning champion, but did not participate.

== Seeds ==
1. (Switzerland) Belinda Bencic (first round)
2. (Spain) Carla Suárez Navarro (first round)
3. (Slovakia) Viktória Kužmová (second round)
4. (Belgium) Alison Van Uytvanck (second round)
5. (France) Pauline Parmentier (first round)
6. (Russia) Ekaterina Alexandrova (first round)
7. (Sweden) Rebecca Peterson (second round)
8. (Belarus) Vera Lapko (quarterfinals)

== Draw ==
Key

- Q = Qualifier
- WC = Wild card
- LL = Lucky loser
- Alt = Alternate
- ITF = ITF entry
- PR = Protected ranking
- SR = Special ranking
- SE = Special exempt
- JE = Junior exempt
- JR = Junior Accelerator Programme entrant
- CO = College Accelerator Programme entrant
- NG = Next Gen Accelerator Program entrant
- w/o = Walkover
- r = Retired
- d = Defaulted

=== Finals ===
Semifinals
(Czech Republic) Kristýna Plíšková	0	1
(Poland) Iga Świątek	6	6
(France) Fiona Ferro	5	4
(Slovenia) Polona Hercog	7	6

Final
(Poland) Iga Świątek	3	6	3
(Slovenia) Polona Hercog	6	3	6

=== Top half ===
First round
1	(Switzerland) B Bencic	5	2
Q	(Germany) A Lottner	7	6
WC	(Switzerland) Y In-Albon	4	5
(Czech Republic) Kr Plíšková	6	7
(Switzerland) T Bacsinszky	6	6
(Germany) T Korpatsch	0	2
WC	(Russia) S Kuznetsova	3	6	7^{8}
6	(Russia) E Alexandrova	6	2	6^{6}
3	(Slovakia) V Kužmová	6	6
Q	(Italy) G Gatto-Monticone	2	2
(Poland) I Świątek	6	6
Q	(Ukraine) K Zavatska	3	0
(Russia) E Rodina	6^{2}	6	7
Q	(Denmark) C Tauson	7^{7}	2	5
Q	(Hungary) RL Jani	2	6	2
8	(Belarus) V Lapko	6	2	6

Second round
Q	(Germany) A Lottner	2	4
(Czech Republic) Kr Plíšková	6	6
(Switzerland) T Bacsinszky	7	3	4
WC	(Russia) S Kuznetsova	5	6	6
3	(Slovakia) V Kužmová	3	6	2
(Poland) I Świątek	6	3	6
(Russia) E Rodina	2	0
8	(Belarus) V Lapko	6	6

Quarterfinals
(Czech Republic) Kr Plíšková	4	6	7
WC	(Russia) S Kuznetsova	6	3	5
(Poland) I Świątek	4	6	6
8	(Belarus) V Lapko	6	4	1

Semifinals
(Czech Republic) Kr Plíšková	0	1
(Poland) I Świątek	6	6

=== Bottom half ===
First round
5	(France) P Parmentier	2	4
(Switzerland) S Vögele	6	6
(Switzerland) V Golubic	3	7^{7}	6
(Netherlands) A Rus	6	6^{5}	2
(France) F Ferro	6	7
(Luxembourg) M Minella	2	5
(Czech Republic) T Smitková	2	6	4
4	(Belgium) A Van Uytvanck	6	0	6
7	(Sweden) R Peterson	6	7^{7}
Q	(Poland) M Fręch	3	6^{2}
WC	(Switzerland) J Teichmann	2	6	6^{2}
(Russia) V Kudermetova	6	4	7^{7}
(Germany) M Barthel	7^{8}	2	4
(Romania) S Cîrstea	6^{6}	6	6
(Slovenia) P Hercog	3	6	6
2	(Spain) C Suárez Navarro	6	3	4

Second round
(Switzerland) S Vögele	6	6
(Switzerland) V Golubic	1	1
(France) F Ferro	6	7
4	(Belgium) A Van Uytvanck	4	5
7	(Sweden) R Peterson	6	4	6^{2}
(Russia) V Kudermetova	1	6	7^{7}
(Romania) S Cîrstea	6	6^{0}	4
(Slovenia) P Hercog	3	7^{7}	6

Quarterfinals
(Switzerland) S Vögele	5	6^{5}
(France) F Ferro	7	7^{7}
(Russia) V Kudermetova	4	1
(Slovenia) P Hercog	6	6

Semifinals
(France) F Ferro	5	4
(Slovenia) P Hercog	7	6

== Qualifying ==
=== Seeds ===
1. (Czech Republic) Tereza Smitková (moved to main draw)
2. (Spain) Paula Badosa Gibert (qualifying competition, retired)
3. (Germany) Tamara Korpatsch (moved to main draw)
4. (Bulgaria) Viktoriya Tomova (first round)
5. (Georgia (country)) Ekaterine Gorgodze (first round)
6. (Czech Republic) Tereza Martincová (qualifying competition)
7. (Russia) Liudmila Samsonova (first round)
8. (Ukraine) Katarina Zavatska (qualified)
9. (Liechtenstein) Kathinka von Deichmann (first round)
10. (Germany) Antonia Lottner (qualified)
11. (Poland) Magdalena Fręch (qualified)
12. (Slovakia) Rebecca Šramková (first round)

=== Qualifiers ===
1. (Denmark) Clara Tauson
2. (Ukraine) Katarina Zavatska
3. (Italy) Giulia Gatto-Monticone
4. (Germany) Antonia Lottner
5. (Poland) Magdalena Fręch
6. (Hungary) Réka Luca Jani

=== Draw ===
==== First qualifier ====
First round
Alt	(Sweden) Cornelia Lister	1	4
(Croatia) Tereza Mrdeža	6	6
WC	(Denmark) Clara Tauson	6	6
12	(Slovakia) Rebecca Šramková	1	2

Qualifying competition
(Croatia) Tereza Mrdeža	3	3
WC	(Denmark) Clara Tauson	6	6

==== Second qualifier ====
First round
2	(Spain) Paula Badosa Gibert	6	6
(Czech Republic) Anastasia Zarycká	2	3
WC	(Switzerland) Tess Sugnaux	0	0
8	(Ukraine) Katarina Zavatska	6	6

Qualifying competition
2	(Spain) Paula Badosa Gibert	5	0^{r}
8	(Ukraine) Katarina Zavatska	7	3

==== Third qualifier ====
First round
Alt	(Russia) Ekaterina Yashina	6	6^{5}	0
WC	(Switzerland) Fiona Ganz	2	7^{7}	6
(Italy) Giulia Gatto-Monticone	6	6
9	(Liechtenstein) Kathinka von Deichmann	4	4

Qualifying competition
WC	(Switzerland) Fiona Ganz	2	2
(Italy) Giulia Gatto-Monticone	6	6

==== Fourth qualifier ====
First round
4	(Bulgaria) Viktoriya Tomova	0	2
(Austria) Barbara Haas	6	6
WC	(Switzerland) Leonie Küng	0	1
10	(Germany) Antonia Lottner	6	6

Qualifying competition
(Austria) Barbara Haas	7^{7}	4	4
10	(Germany) Antonia Lottner	6^{4}	6	6

==== Fifth qualifier ====
First round
5	(Georgia (country)) Ekaterine Gorgodze	4	6	3
(Italy) Martina Di Giuseppe	6	2	6
(Italy) Deborah Chiesa	4	4
11	(Poland) Magdalena Fręch	6	6

Qualifying competition
(Italy) Martina Di Giuseppe	4	0
11	(Poland) Magdalena Fręch	6	6

==== Sixth qualifier ====
First round
6	(Czech Republic) Tereza Martincová	7	5	6
(Hungary) Anna Bondár	5	7	2
(Hungary) Réka Luca Jani	6	6
7	(Russia) Liudmila Samsonova	2	2

Qualifying competition
6	(Czech Republic) Tereza Martincová	6	0	5
(Hungary) Réka Luca Jani	4	6	7
