= 2017 Ladies Open Biel Bienne – Singles =

Singles
- 2017 Ladies Open Biel Bienne

Final
- Champion: (Czech Republic) Markéta Vondroušová
- Runner-up: (Estonia) Anett Kontaveit
- Score: 6–4, 7–6^{(8–6)}

Events
Singles	Doubles
- Ladies Open Biel Bienne

This is the first edition of the tournament.

Qualifier Markéta Vondroušová won her first WTA title at the age of 17 in only her second appearance in a WTA main draw, defeating Anett Kontaveit in the final, 6–4, 7–6^{(8–6)}. Ranked no. 233, Vondroušová became the second-lowest ranked player (at the time) ever to win a WTA singles title.

== Seeds ==
1. (Czech Republic) Barbora Strýcová (semifinals)
2. (Spain) Carla Suárez Navarro (second round)
3. (Hungary) Tímea Babos (first round, retired)
4. (Italy) Roberta Vinci (first round)
5. (Germany) Laura Siegemund (first round)
6. (France) Alizé Cornet (withdrew)
7. (Germany) Julia Görges (quarterfinals, retired)
8. (Romania) Monica Niculescu (first round)

== Draw ==
Key

- Q = Qualifier
- WC = Wild card
- LL = Lucky loser
- Alt = Alternate
- ITF = ITF entry
- PR = Protected ranking
- SR = Special ranking
- SE = Special exempt
- JE = Junior exempt
- JR = Junior Accelerator Programme entrant
- CO = College Accelerator Programme entrant
- NG = Next Gen Accelerator Program entrant
- w/o = Walkover
- r = Retired
- d = Defaulted

=== Finals ===
Semifinals
1	(Czech Republic) Barbora Strýcová	6^{3}	2
Q	(Czech Republic) Markéta Vondroušová	7^{7}	6
(Estonia) Anett Kontaveit	6	4	7
Q	(Belarus) Aliaksandra Sasnovich	4	6	5

Final
Q	(Czech Republic) Markéta Vondroušová	6	7^{8}
(Estonia) Anett Kontaveit	4	6^{6}

=== Top half ===
First round
1	(Czech Republic) B Strýcová	6	4	6
Q	(Czech Republic) M Bouzková	2	6	2
(Germany) C Witthöft	6	6
WC	(Switzerland) B Bencic	1	3
(France) O Dodin	6	6
(Chinese Taipei) S-w Hsieh	2	2
(United Kingdom) N Broady	4	2
7	(Germany) J Görges	6	6
4	(Italy) R Vinci	4	4
(Czech Republic) Kr Plíšková	6	6
(Croatia) D Vekić	6	6
(Romania) S Cîrstea	4	1
WC	(Switzerland) R Masarova	4	4
(Germany) A Beck	6	6
Q	(Czech Republic) M Vondroušová	7^{7}	6
LL	(North Macedonia) L Gjorcheska	6^{4}	1

Second round
1	(Czech Republic) B Strýcová	6	7^{8}
(Germany) C Witthöft	2	6^{6}
(France) O Dodin	4	3
7	(Germany) J Görges	6	6
(Czech Republic) Kr Plíšková	6	6
(Croatia) D Vekić	1	2
(Germany) A Beck	1	3
Q	(Czech Republic) M Vondroušová	6	6

Quarterfinals
1	(Czech Republic) B Strýcová	4	6	1
7	(Germany) J Görges	6	3	0^{r}
(Czech Republic) Kr Plíšková	2	5
Q	(Czech Republic) M Vondroušová	6	7

Semifinals
1	(Czech Republic) B Strýcová	6^{3}	2
Q	(Czech Republic) M Vondroušová	7^{7}	6

=== Bottom half ===
First round
8	(Romania) M Niculescu	2	2
(Belgium) E Mertens	6	6
(Slovakia) J Čepelová	3	4
(Germany) M Barthel	6	6
(Estonia) A Kontaveit	7^{7}	6
(United Kingdom) H Watson	6^{2}	2
(Russia) E Rodina	7^{9}	4
3	(Hungary) T Babos	6^{7}	2^{r}
5	(Germany) L Siegemund	2	6	6^{3}
(Switzerland) V Golubic	6	4	7^{7}
(France) P Parmentier	6	2	3
Q	(Belarus) A Sasnovich	3	6	6
Q	(Germany) A Lottner	2	2
(Italy) C Giorgi	6	6
(United States) J Boserup	1	2
2/WC	(Spain) C Suárez Navarro	6	6

Second round
(Belgium) E Mertens	6	6
(Germany) M Barthel	2	4
(Estonia) A Kontaveit	6	6
(Russia) E Rodina	3	2
(Switzerland) V Golubic	1	4
Q	(Belarus) A Sasnovich	6	6
(Italy) C Giorgi	2	7^{7}	6
2/WC	(Spain) C Suárez Navarro	6	6^{5}	2

Quarterfinals
(Belgium) E Mertens	5	7^{7}	1
(Estonia) A Kontaveit	7	6^{2}	6
Q	(Belarus) A Sasnovich	6	6
(Italy) C Giorgi	4	4

Semifinals
(Estonia) A Kontaveit	6	4	7
Q	(Belarus) A Sasnovich	4	6	5

== Qualifying ==
=== Seeds ===
1. (Belarus) Aliaksandra Sasnovich (qualified)
2. (Slovakia) Rebecca Šramková (first round)
3. (Belarus) Aryna Sabalenka (second round)
4. (Netherlands) Richèl Hogenkamp (second round)
5. (Germany) Tamara Korpatsch (first round)
6. (Czech Republic) Tereza Smitková (second round)
7. (Russia) Anastasiya Komardina (first round)
8. (Serbia) Ivana Jorović (second round)

=== Qualifiers ===
1. (Belarus) Aliaksandra Sasnovich
2. (Czech Republic) Marie Bouzková
3. (Czech Republic) Markéta Vondroušová
4. (Germany) Antonia Lottner

=== Lucky losers ===
1. (North Macedonia) Lina Gjorcheska

=== Draw ===
==== First qualifier ====
First round
1	(Belarus) Aliaksandra Sasnovich
Bye
(Switzerland) Amra Sadiković	6	7
(Switzerland) Tess Sugnaux	2	5
(Ukraine) Olga Savchuk	2	6	2
(North Macedonia) Lina Gjorcheska	6	3	6
(Latvia) Diāna Marcinkēviča	2	6	6
7	(Russia) Anastasiya Komardina	6	2	0

Second round
1	(Belarus) Aliaksandra Sasnovich	6	4	6
(Switzerland) Amra Sadiković	3	6	3
(North Macedonia) Lina Gjorcheska	6	4	6
(Latvia) Diāna Marcinkēviča	4	6	4

Qualifying competition
1	(Belarus) Aliaksandra Sasnovich	6	6
(North Macedonia) Lina Gjorcheska	3	2

==== Second qualifier ====
First round
2	(Slovakia) Rebecca Šramková	4	4
(Czech Republic) Marie Bouzková	6	6
(United Kingdom) Eden Silva	4	1
(Slovakia) Vivien Juhászová	6	6
WC	(Switzerland) Simona Waltert	6	0	2
(France) Amandine Hesse	4	6	6
WC	(Switzerland) Xenia Knoll	1	1
8	(Serbia) Ivana Jorović	6	6

Second round
(Czech Republic) Marie Bouzková	6	6
(Slovakia) Vivien Juhászová	2	4
(France) Amandine Hesse	4	6	6
6	(Serbia) Ivana Jorović	6	2	3

Qualifying competition
(Czech Republic) Marie Bouzková	6	6
(France) Amandine Hesse	2	4

==== Third qualifier ====
First round
3	(Belarus) Aryna Sabalenka	6	6
WC	(Switzerland) Ylena In-Albon	2	0
(France) Tessah Andrianjafitrimo	6	3	4
(Czech Republic) Markéta Vondroušová	4	6	6
(Italy) Jasmine Paolini	7	4	6
(Bulgaria) Aleksandrina Naydenova	5	6	2
(Croatia) Jana Fett	3	6	4
6	(Czech Republic) Tereza Smitková	6	2	6

Second round
3	(Belarus) Aryna Sabalenka	6	2	1
(Czech Republic) Markéta Vondroušová	2	6	6
(Italy) Jasmine Paolini	2	6	6
6	(Czech Republic) Tereza Smitková	6	4	3

Qualifying competition
(Czech Republic) Markéta Vondroušová	7	6
(Italy) Jasmine Paolini	5	2

==== Fourth qualifier ====
First round
4	(Netherlands) Richèl Hogenkamp	3	6	7
WC	(Germany) Natalie Pröse	6	2	5
(Germany) Antonia Lottner	7	6
(Slovakia) Anna Karolína Schmiedlová	5	4
WC	(Switzerland) Leonie Küng	4	3
(Netherlands) Lesley Kerkhove	6	6
(Russia) Valeriya Solovyeva	6	4	6
5	(Germany) Tamara Korpatsch	2	6	4

Second round
4	(Netherlands) Richèl Hogenkamp	3	2
(Germany) Antonia Lottner	6	6
(Netherlands) Lesley Kerkhove	1	6^{3}
(Russia) Valeriya Solovyeva	6	7^{7}

Qualifying competition
(Germany) Antonia Lottner	6	6
(Russia) Valeriya Solovyeva	2	3
