= 2024 Berlin Ladies Open – Singles =

Singles
- 2024 Berlin Ladies Open

Final
- Champion: (United States) Jessica Pegula
- Runner-up: Anna Kalinskaya
- Score: 6–7^{(0–7)}, 6–4, 7–6^{(7–3)}

Details
- Draw: 28 (6 Q / 4 WC )
- Seeds: 8

Events
Singles	Doubles
← 2023 ·	German Open (WTA)	· 2025 →

Jessica Pegula defeated Anna Kalinskaya in the final, 6–7^{(0–7)}, 6–4, 7–6^{(7–3)} to win the women's singles tennis title at the 2024 Berlin Ladies Open. She saved five championship points en route to her fifth career WTA Tour singles title.

Petra Kvitová was the defending champion, but did not participate due to pregnancy.

== Seeds ==
The top four seeds received a bye into the second round.

1. (United States) Coco Gauff (semifinals)
2. Aryna Sabalenka (quarterfinals, retired)
3. (Kazakhstan) Elena Rybakina (quarterfinals, retired)
4. (United States) Jessica Pegula (champion)
5. (Czech Republic) Markéta Vondroušová (second round, retired)
6. (China) Zheng Qinwen (second round)
7. (Greece) Maria Sakkari (first round)
8. (Tunisia) Ons Jabeur (quarterfinals, retired)

== Draw ==
=== Key ===
- Q = Qualifier
- WC = Wild card
- LL = Lucky loser
- Alt = Alternate
- ITF = ITF entry
- PR = Protected ranking
- SR = Special ranking
- SE = Special exempt
- JE = Junior exempt
- JR = Junior Accelerator Programme entrant
- CO = College Accelerator Programme entrant
- NG = Next Gen Accelerator Program entrant
- w/o = Walkover
- r = Retired
- d = Defaulted

=== Finals ===
Semifinals
1	(United States) Coco Gauff	5	6^{2}
4	(United States) Jessica Pegula	7	7^{7}
Victoria Azarenka	1	7^{7}	1
Anna Kalinskaya	6	6^{3}	6

Final
4	(United States) Jessica Pegula	6^{0}	6	7^{7}
Anna Kalinskaya	7^{7}	4	6^{3}

=== Top half ===
First round
(Brazil) B Haddad Maia	4	4
E Alexandrova	6	6
(Czech Republic) L Nosková	7^{7}	2	6
WC	(Germany) A Kerber	6^{4}	6	4
Q	(China) Xin Wang	4	6^{4}
8	(Tunisia) O Jabeur	6	7^{7}
WC	(Croatia) D Vekić	1	6	6
WC	(Germany) J Niemeier	6	1	3
Q	(Czech Republic) K Siniaková	6	6
(United States) E Navarro	4	3
WC	(Japan) N Osaka	4	6	3
6	(China) Q Zheng	6	3	6

Second round
1	(United States) C Gauff	7^{8}	6
E Alexandrova	6^{6}	2
(Czech Republic) L Nosková	7^{7}	3	4
8	(Tunisia) O Jabeur	6^{5}	6	6
4	(United States) J Pegula	6	7
WC	(Croatia) D Vekić	4	5
Q	(Czech Republic) K Siniaková	6	6
6	(China) Q Zheng	4	4

Quarterfinals
1	(United States) C Gauff	7^{11}	0
8	(Tunisia) O Jabeur	6^{9}	0^{r}
4	(United States) J Pegula	7^{7}	3	6
Q	(Czech Republic) K Siniaková	6^{2}	6	3

Semifinals
1	(United States) C Gauff	5	6^{2}
4	(United States) J Pegula	7	7^{7}

=== Bottom half ===
First round
7	(Greece) M Sakkari	4	2
V Azarenka	6	6
LL	(Netherlands) A Rus	6	2	1
Q	(Turkey) Z Sönmez	3	6	6
Q	V Kudermetova	3	6	6
L Samsonova	6	4	4
5	(Czech Republic) M Vondroušová	6	6
Q	(Spain) R Masarova	4	3
Q	(Japan) N Hibino	6	4	2
A Kalinskaya	2	6	6
(Ukraine) M Kostyuk	6	6^{6}	3
D Kasatkina	4	7^{8}	6

Second round
V Azarenka	6	6
Q	(Turkey) Z Sönmez	3	3
Q	V Kudermetova	4	5
3	(Kazakhstan) E Rybakina	6	7
5	(Czech Republic) M Vondroušová	5^{r}
A Kalinskaya	5
D Kasatkina	1	4
2	A Sabalenka	6	6

Quarterfinals
V Azarenka	3
3	(Kazakhstan) E Rybakina	1^{r}
A Kalinskaya	5
2	A Sabalenka	1^{r}

Semifinals
V Azarenka	1	7^{7}	1
A Kalinskaya	6	6^{3}	6

== Qualifying ==
=== Seeds ===
1. (Ukraine) Dayana Yastremska (first round)
2. (Czech Republic) Kateřina Siniaková (qualified)
3. Veronika Kudermetova (qualified)
4. (China) Wang Xinyu (qualified)
5. (Netherlands) Arantxa Rus (qualifying competition, lucky loser)
6. (Denmark) Clara Tauson (withdrew)
7. (Germany) Tamara Korpatsch (first round)
8. (Japan) Nao Hibino (qualified)
9. (United States) Emina Bektas (qualifying competition)
10. Aliaksandra Sasnovich (qualifying competition)
11. (Spain) Rebeka Masarova (qualified)
12. (Australia) Arina Rodionova (first round)

=== Qualifiers ===
1. (Turkey) Zeynep Sönmez
2. (Czech Republic) Kateřina Siniaková
3. Veronika Kudermetova
4. (China) Wang Xinyu
5. (Japan) Nao Hibino
6. (Spain) Rebeka Masarova

=== Lucky loser ===
1. (Netherlands) Arantxa Rus

=== Qualifying draw ===
==== First qualifier ====
First round
1	(Ukraine) Dayana Yastremska	6	4	1
(Turkey) Zeynep Sönmez	3	6	6
(Germany) Ella Seidel	3	2
9	(United States) Emina Bektas	6	6

Qualifying competition
(Turkey) Zeynep Sönmez	7^{9}	2	6
9	(United States) Emina Bektas	6^{7}	6	3

==== Second qualifier ====
First round
2	(Czech Republic) Kateřina Siniaková	6	6
WC	(Germany) Noma Noha Akugue	3	0
(Ukraine) Yuliia Starodubtseva	6	4	6
7	(Germany) Tamara Korpatsch	1	6	0

Qualifying competition
2	(Czech Republic) Kateřina Siniaková	6	6
(Ukraine) Yuliia Starodubtseva	2	2

==== Third qualifier ====
First round
3	Veronika Kudermetova	6	6
WC	(Germany) Anica Stabel	0	2
(United States) Kayla Day	6	6
12	(Australia) Arina Rodionova	0	3

Qualifying competition
3	Veronika Kudermetova	6	6
(United States) Kayla Day	1	1

==== Fourth qualifier ====
First round
4	(China) Wang Xinyu	6	6
WC	(Germany) Mara Guth	1	3
(Serbia) Aleksandra Krunić	4	1
10	Aliaksandra Sasnovich	6	6

Qualifying competition
4	(China) Wang Xinyu	6	6
10	Aliaksandra Sasnovich	4	1

==== Fifth qualifier ====
First round
5	(Netherlands) Arantxa Rus	6	7
(France) Fiona Ferro	4	5
(Netherlands) Suzan Lamens	6	1	2
8	(Japan) Nao Hibino	3	6	6

Qualifying competition
5	(Netherlands) Arantxa Rus	2	6^{4}
8	(Japan) Nao Hibino	6	7^{7}

==== Sixth qualifier ====
First round
Alt	Ekaterina Makarova	6^{5}	7	2
(Czech Republic) Sára Bejlek	7^{7}	5	6
WC	(Germany) Lena Papadakis	3	1
11	(Spain) Rebeka Masarova	6	6

Qualifying competition
(Czech Republic) Sára Bejlek	7^{7}	4	6^{3}
11	(Spain) Rebeka Masarova	6^{4}	6	7^{7}
