= 2024 Berlin Ladies Open =

- Date: 17–23 June
- Edition: 101st
- Category: WTA 500
- Draw: 28S / 24Q / 16D
- Surface: Grass
- Location: Berlin, Germany
- Venue: Rot-Weiss Tennis Club

Champions

Singles
- (United States) Jessica Pegula

Doubles
- (China) Wang Xinyu / (China) Zheng Saisai
- German Open (WTA)

The 2024 Berlin Ladies Open (also known as the ecotrans Ladies Open for sponsorship reasons) was a professional tennis tournament played on outdoor grass courts at the Rot-Weiss Tennis Club in Berlin, Germany from 17 June to 23 June 2024. It was the 101st edition of the WTA German Open, classed as a WTA 500 on the 2024 WTA Tour. Fourth-seeded Jessica Pegula won the singles title.

== Champions ==
=== Singles ===
- (United States) Jessica Pegula def. Anna Kalinskaya, 6–7^{(0–7)}, 6–4, 7–6^{(7–3)}

=== Doubles ===
- (China) Wang Xinyu / (China) Zheng Saisai def. (Chinese Taipei) Chan Hao-ching / Veronika Kudermetova, 6–2, 7–5

== Singles main-draw entrants ==
=== Seeds ===
Country	Player	Rank	Seed
USA	Coco Gauff	2	1
	Aryna Sabalenka	3	2
KAZ	Elena Rybakina	4	3
USA	Jessica Pegula	5	4
CZE	Markéta Vondroušová	6	5
CHN	Zheng Qinwen	8	6
GRE	Maria Sakkari	9	7
TUN	Ons Jabeur	10	8

- Rankings are as of 10 June 2024.

=== Other entrants ===
The following players received wildcards into the singles main draw:

- (Germany) Angelique Kerber
- (Germany) Jule Niemeier
- (Japan) Naomi Osaka
- (Croatia) Donna Vekić

The following players received entry from the qualifying draw:

- (Japan) Nao Hibino
- Veronika Kudermetova
- (Spain) Rebeka Masarova
- (Czech Republic) Kateřina Siniaková
- (Turkey) Zeynep Sönmez
- (China) Wang Xinyu

The following player received entry as a lucky loser:

- (Netherlands) Arantxa Rus

=== Withdrawals ===
- (France) Caroline Garcia → replaced by (Netherlands) Arantxa Rus
- (Italy) Jasmine Paolini → replaced by (United States) Emma Navarro
- Anastasia Pavlyuchenkova → replaced by (Czech Republic) Linda Nosková
- (Poland) Iga Świątek → replaced by Anna Kalinskaya

== Doubles main draw entrants ==
=== Seeds ===
Country	Player	Country	Player	Rank	Seed
USA	Nicole Melichar-Martinez	AUS	Ellen Perez	18	1
NED	Demi Schuurs	BRA	Luisa Stefani	29	2
UKR	Lyudmyla Kichenok	UKR	Nadiia Kichenok	52	3
USA	Coco Gauff	USA	Jessica Pegula	56	4

- Rankings are as of 10 June 2024.

=== Other entrants ===
The following pairs received wildcards into the doubles main draw:

- Victoria Azarenka / (Spain) Paula Badosa
- (Germany) Jule Niemeier / (Germany) Noma Noha Akugue
