= 2019 Ladies Open Lugano – Doubles =

Doubles
- 2019 Ladies Open Lugano

Final
- Champions: (Romania) Sorana Cîrstea (Romania) Andreea Mitu
- Runners-up: (Russia) Veronika Kudermetova (Kazakhstan) Galina Voskoboeva
- Score: 1–6, 6–2, [10–8]

Events
Singles	Doubles
- Ladies Open Lugano

Kirsten Flipkens and Elise Mertens were the defending champions, but chose not to participate.

Sorana Cîrstea and Andreea Mitu won the title, defeating Veronika Kudermetova and Galina Voskoboeva in the final, 1–6, 6–2, [10–8].

== Seeds ==
1. (Russia) Veronika Kudermetova / (Kazakhstan) Galina Voskoboeva (final)
2. (Sweden) Cornelia Lister / (Czech Republic) Renata Voráčová (quarterfinals)
3. (Romania) Sorana Cîrstea / (Romania) Andreea Mitu (champions)
4. (Switzerland) Belinda Bencic / (Slovakia) Viktória Kužmová (semifinals)

== Draw ==
Key

- Q = Qualifier
- WC = Wild card
- LL = Lucky loser
- Alt = Alternate
- ITF = ITF entry
- PR = Protected ranking
- SR = Special ranking
- SE = Special exempt
- JE = Junior exempt
- JR = Junior Accelerator Programme entrant
- CO = College Accelerator Programme entrant
- NG = Next Gen Accelerator Program entrant
- w/o = Walkover
- r = Retired
- d = Defaulted

=== Draw ===
First round
1	(Russia) V Kudermetova (Kazakhstan) G Voskoboeva	6	7^{7}
(Russia) A Fomina (Netherlands) E Wacanno	3	6^{0}
(Germany) M Barthel (Switzerland) X Knoll	6	7^{8}
(France) F Ferro (France) P Parmentier	1	6^{6}
4	(Switzerland) B Bencic (Slovakia) V Kužmová	7	6
(Georgia (country)) O Kalashnikova (Sweden) R Peterson	5	3
Alt	(Georgia (country)) E Gorgodze (Germany) T Korpatsch	4	4
(Italy) G Marchetti (Netherlands) A Rus	6	6
(India) P Thombare (Russia) E Yashina	3	2
(Belarus) V Lapko (Luxembourg) M Minella	6	6
WC	(Switzerland) L Küng (Denmark) C Tauson	4	6	[7]
3	(Romania) S Cîrstea (Romania) A Mitu	6	3	[10]
(Chinese Taipei) P-h Chen (Chinese Taipei) F-h Wu	2	4
WC	(Switzerland) T Bacsinszky (Switzerland) Y In-Albon	6	6
(Slovakia) C Škamlová (Czech Republic) A Zarycká	1	3
2	(Sweden) C Lister (Czech Republic) R Voráčová	6	6

Quarterfinals
1	(Russia) V Kudermetova (Kazakhstan) G Voskoboeva	6^{4}	6	[10]
(Germany) M Barthel (Switzerland) X Knoll	7^{7}	1	[5]
4	(Switzerland) B Bencic (Slovakia) V Kužmová	7^{8}	4	[11]
(Italy) G Marchetti (Netherlands) A Rus	6^{6}	6	[9]
(Belarus) V Lapko (Luxembourg) M Minella	2	6	[7]
3	(Romania) S Cîrstea (Romania) A Mitu	6	2	[10]
WC	(Switzerland) T Bacsinszky (Switzerland) Y In-Albon	4	6	[10]
2	(Sweden) C Lister (Czech Republic) R Voráčová	6	4	[7]

Semifinals
1	(Russia) V Kudermetova (Kazakhstan) G Voskoboeva	6	7^{7}
4	(Switzerland) B Bencic (Slovakia) V Kužmová	3	6^{5}
3	(Romania) S Cîrstea (Romania) A Mitu	6	6
WC	(Switzerland) T Bacsinszky (Switzerland) Y In-Albon	4	3

Final
1	(Russia) V Kudermetova (Kazakhstan) G Voskoboeva	6	2	[8]
3	(Romania) S Cîrstea (Romania) A Mitu	1	6	[10]
