= Markéta Vondroušová =

Inactive Czech tennis player (born 1999)

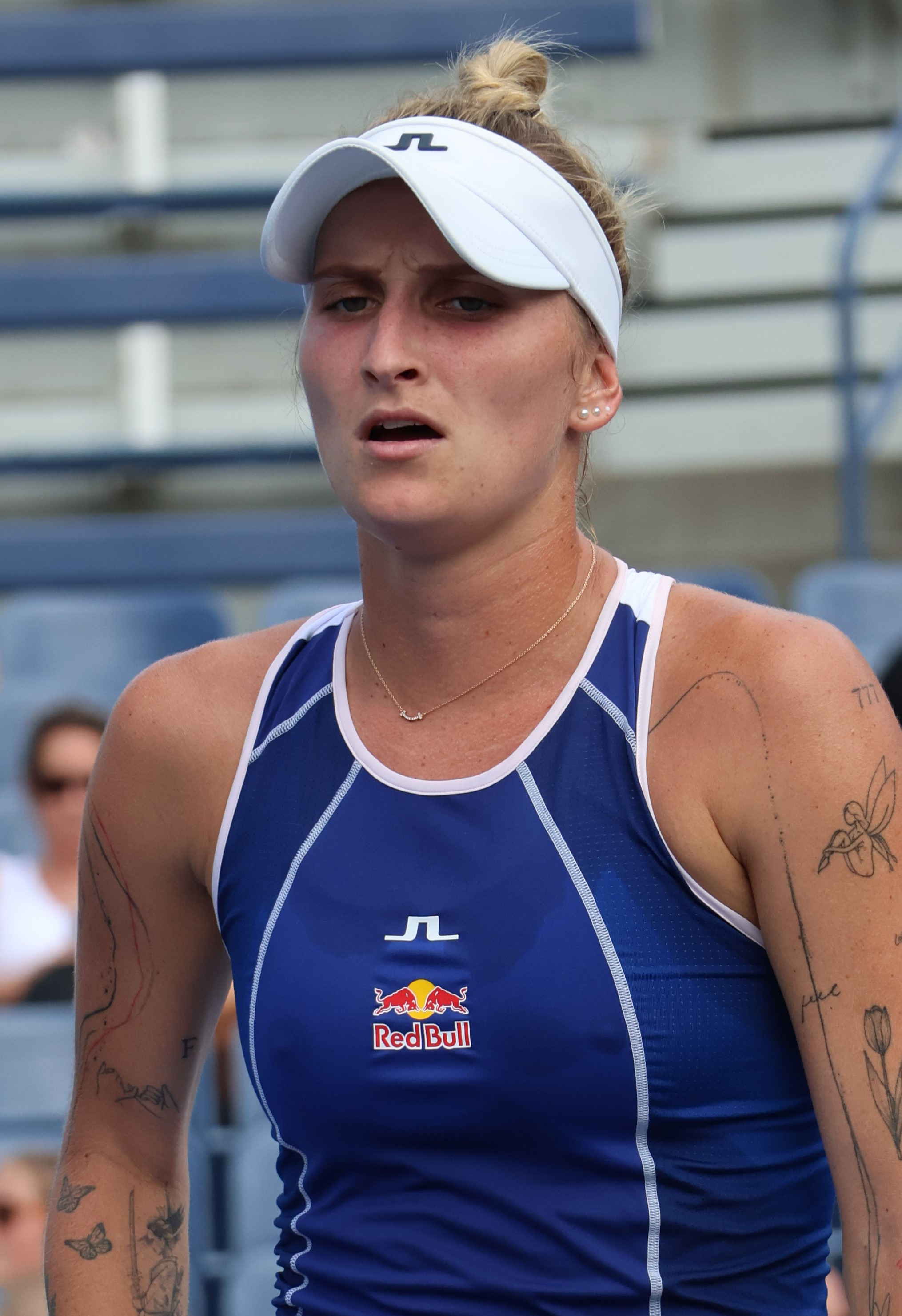
- Vondroušová at the 2023 US Open
- Country (sports): Czech Republic
- Residence: Prague, Czech Republic
- Born: 28 June 1999 (age 27) Sokolov, Czech Republic
- Height: 1.72 m (5 ft 8 in)
- Turned pro: 2014
- Retired: 2026–2030 (suspension)
- Plays: Left-handed (two-handed backhand)
- Coach: Jiří Hřebec; Jan Hernych
- Prize money: US$ 11,992,580

Singles
- Career record: 295–132
- Career titles: 3
- Highest ranking: No. 6 (11 September 2023)
- Current ranking: No. 122 (22 June 2026)

Grand Slam singles results
- Australian Open: 4R (2021)
- French Open: F (2019)
- Wimbledon: W (2023)
- US Open: QF (2023, 2025)

Other tournaments
- Tour Finals: RR (2023)
- Olympic Games: F (2021)

Doubles
- Career record: 90–51
- Career titles: 0
- Highest ranking: No. 38 (11 September 2023)
- Current ranking: No. 234 (22 June 2026)

Grand Slam doubles results
- Australian Open: SF (2019)
- French Open: 2R (2019, 2023)
- Wimbledon: QF (2017)
- US Open: 3R (2023)

Other doubles tournaments
- Olympic Games: 2R (2020)

Grand Slam mixed doubles results
- Wimbledon: 2R (2021)

Team competitions
- Fed Cup: SF (2017), record 13–2
Medal record
Representing Czech Republic
Olympic Games
Silver medal – second place	2020 Tokyo	Singles
- Last updated on: 23 June 2026.

Markéta Vondroušová (Czech: [ˈmarkɛːta ˈvondrouʃovaː]; born 28 June 1999) is a Czech professional inactive tennis player. She reached a career-high singles ranking of world No. 6 by the WTA. Vondroušová has won three WTA Tour-level singles titles, including the 2023 Wimbledon Championships. She is the first unseeded player to win the Wimbledon women's singles title. She was also runner-up at the 2019 French Open, and claimed a silver medal at the 2020 Tokyo Olympics.

She is a former junior world No. 1, having won two major doubles titles. She had a quick breakthrough on the WTA Tour, winning the 2017 Ladies Open Biel Bienne at age 17 in just her second career WTA Tour singles event. This helped her reach the top 100 of the WTA rankings before turning 18. Her signature shot is the drop shot. She is one of the best returners of her generation, having led the tour in percentage of return games won and percentage of return points won in 2019 among all players with at least ten matches. Vondroušová has struggled with injuries throughout her career.

Vondroušová is currently serving a four-year ban set to end in June 2030 in relation for refusing a doping test in December 2025.

== Early life and background ==
Markéta Vondroušová was born on 28 June 1999 to David Vondrouš and Jindřiška Anderlová in Sokolov, a small town in the north-west of the Czech Republic. Her father introduced her to tennis at the age of four, having played the sport recreationally. Her mother played volleyball for SK Slavia Prague in the top-flight Extraliga. Her parents divorced when Vondroušová was three, but they both stayed in her life and supported her growth as a tennis player. When Vondroušová was young, she tried a variety of sports, including skiing, football, table tennis, and floorball, excelling in them all. She began to focus on tennis early, entering a national mini-tennis tournament on Štvanice island in Prague in 2006, in which she finished third and qualified for an international tournament in Umag in Croatia. At this tournament, she lost in the first round, but won the consolation bracket as an eight-year-old competing against mostly nine-year-old players.

After the tournament on Štvanice, it was arranged for Vondroušová to go back to train there, at the I. ČLTK Prague. During this time, she trained for five days a week, on two of which she travelled from her hometown to Prague to train on Štvanice and spend the night there. She had another international success at age 12, when she won the Nike Junior Tour International Masters in the United States, which was regarded as an unofficial 12-and-under world championship. At age 15, she moved to Prague to train more regularly there.

Vondroušová has a strong athletic background on her mother's side. Her great grandfather, František Frk, was the Czechoslovak national pentathlon champion in 1935.

== Career ==
=== Juniors ===
Vondroušová is a former world No. 1 junior. She made her debut on the ITF Junior Circuit at the age of 13 and won both the singles and doubles events at her first tournament, the Grade 5 San Michel International Tournament in Malta in April 2013. Later in the year, she won a higher-level Grade 4 singles event in Poland as well as a separate Grade 2 doubles event in the Czech Republic. Vondroušová made her Grade 1 debut with a singles semifinal in January 2014, which she followed with a second round loss in her debut at the highest-level Grade A tournaments in May. She entered her first junior Grand Slam events in May and had immediate success, reaching the semifinals at both the French Open and Wimbledon. In both tournaments, she lost to the eventual champions Daria Kasatkina and Jeļena Ostapenko respectively. Vondroušová fared better in doubles at the French Open, finishing runner-up to the Romanian team of Ioana Ducu and Ioana Loredana Roșca alongside American CiCi Bellis in a match tiebreak. Despite losing her opening singles matches at her last two Grade A tournaments of the year, the US Open and the Orange Bowl, Vondroušová ended 2014 by winning the Orange Bowl doubles title with Bellis.

Vondroušová continued to have success in doubles in 2015, most notably winning her only two junior Grand Slam titles and three Grade-A (Note: At the time, Grade A included both the Grand Slam tournaments and five other high-level tournaments.) doubles events in total. Although she lost her opening-round match at the Australian Open, she won the doubles title with compatriot Miriam Kolodziejová without dropping a set. Vondroušová did not play another junior event until late May, instead opting to play events on the professional circuit. In her return, she won both the singles and doubles events at the Grade-A Trofeo Bonfiglio, again partnering with Kolodziejová. She defeated Charlotte Robillard-Millette in the singles final for her only career Grade-A singles title. With these titles, Vondroušová became the No. 1 ranked junior in the world for the first time. While she lost in the semifinals at the French Open for the second consecutive year, she won a second Grand Slam doubles title with Kolodziejová, again without losing a set. The semifinal was her best Grand Slam singles result of the year. Vondroušová and Kolodziejová then won a fourth consecutive title at the Grade-1 Junior International Roehampton before their 28-match win streak came to an end in the Wimbledon semifinals, where they were defeated by the Hungarian team of Dalma Gálfi and Fanny Stollár.

Toward the end of the 2015 season, Vondroušová represented the Czech Republic at the Junior Fed Cup with Monika Kilnarová and Anna Slováková. She won all eight of her rubbers and led the Czech team to the title with a 2–1 victory over US team of Kayla Day and Claire Liu, in the final. Vondroušová only played one junior tournament in 2016, losing in the third round in singles at the French Open.

=== 2014–2017: Pro debut, WTA 250 title, top 100 ===
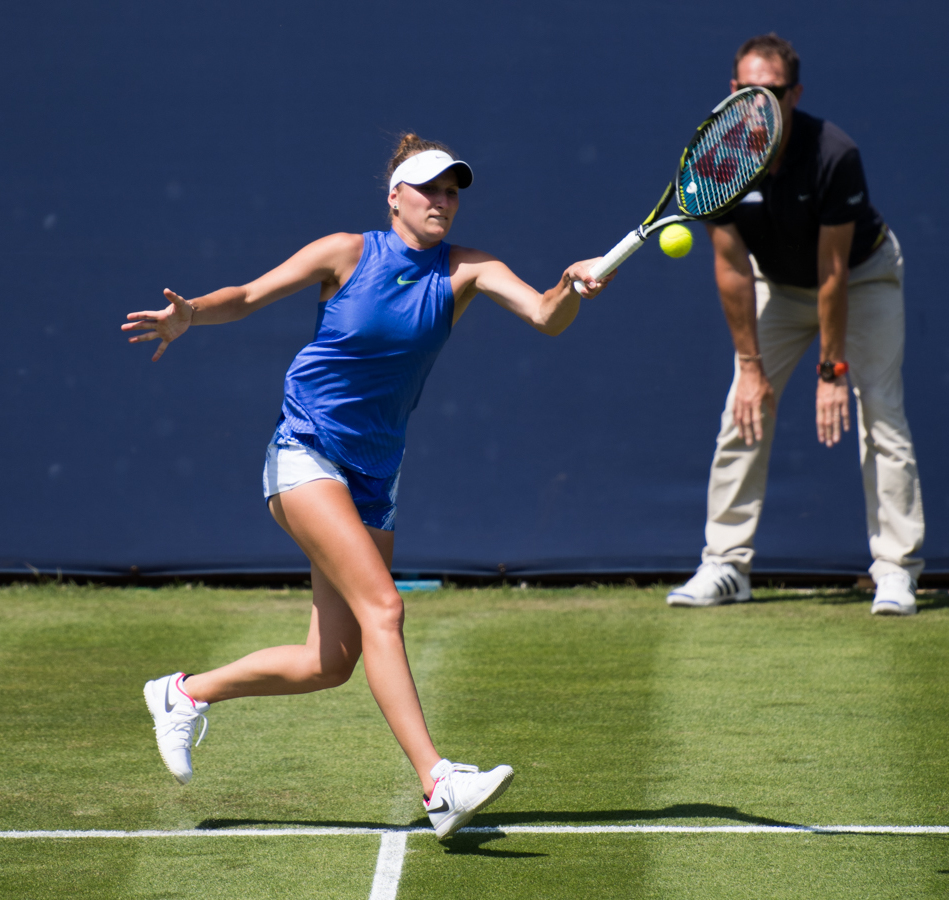
Vondroušová at the 2017 Birmingham Classic

Vondroušová began playing on the ITF Women's Circuit in May 2014 at the age of 14 and qualified for her first main draw later in the year. She reached her first singles final at the lowest $10k level in March 2015 at Sharm El Sheikh, where she won the doubles event for her first professional title. Her first and second singles title came in May and June respectively. Vondroušová made her WTA Tour main-draw doubles debut in April 2015 at the Prague Open, losing her opening match alongside Kateřina Vaňková. She made her WTA Tour singles debut at the same tournament a year later, winning her first career match against Océane Dodin before losing to eventual runner-up Samantha Stosur. Vondroušová did not enter any more events after May 2016 due to a left elbow injury.

Vondroušová returned to the tour in January 2017 and won her first two ITF singles events back followed by two more runner-up finishes in her third and fifth events. This success helped her break into the top 300 for the first time by the end of February.

At the Ladies Open Biel Bienne in April, Vondroušová had her first big breakthrough. She won her maiden WTA Tour title at age 17 in just her second career WTA singles event. After entering the main draw through qualifying, she upset top seed and world No. 18 Barbora Strýcová in the semifinals. She then defeated Anett Kontaveit in the final. With the title, she rose to No. 117 in the world. Having started the tournament at No. 233, she was also the lowest-ranked finalist on the WTA Tour since Justine Henin in 2010. Vondroušová then won a 100k title at the Slovak Open back on the ITF Circuit the next month to enter the top 100 for the first time. This also made her the youngest player in the top 100 at the time.

At her major debut at the French Open, she made it through qualifying and defeated Amandine Hesse in her first main-draw match, before losing to Daria Kasatkina. Vondroušová was directly accepted into the main draw at Wimbledon, losing her opening match. Later that month, she won another ITF title, at the 80k Prague Open, to rise to No. 68 in the world. Nonetheless, she again lost her opening match at the US Open, despite pushing No. 8 Svetlana Kuznetsova to a third-set tiebreak. She ended her season after September.

=== 2018–2019: French Open final, top 15 ===
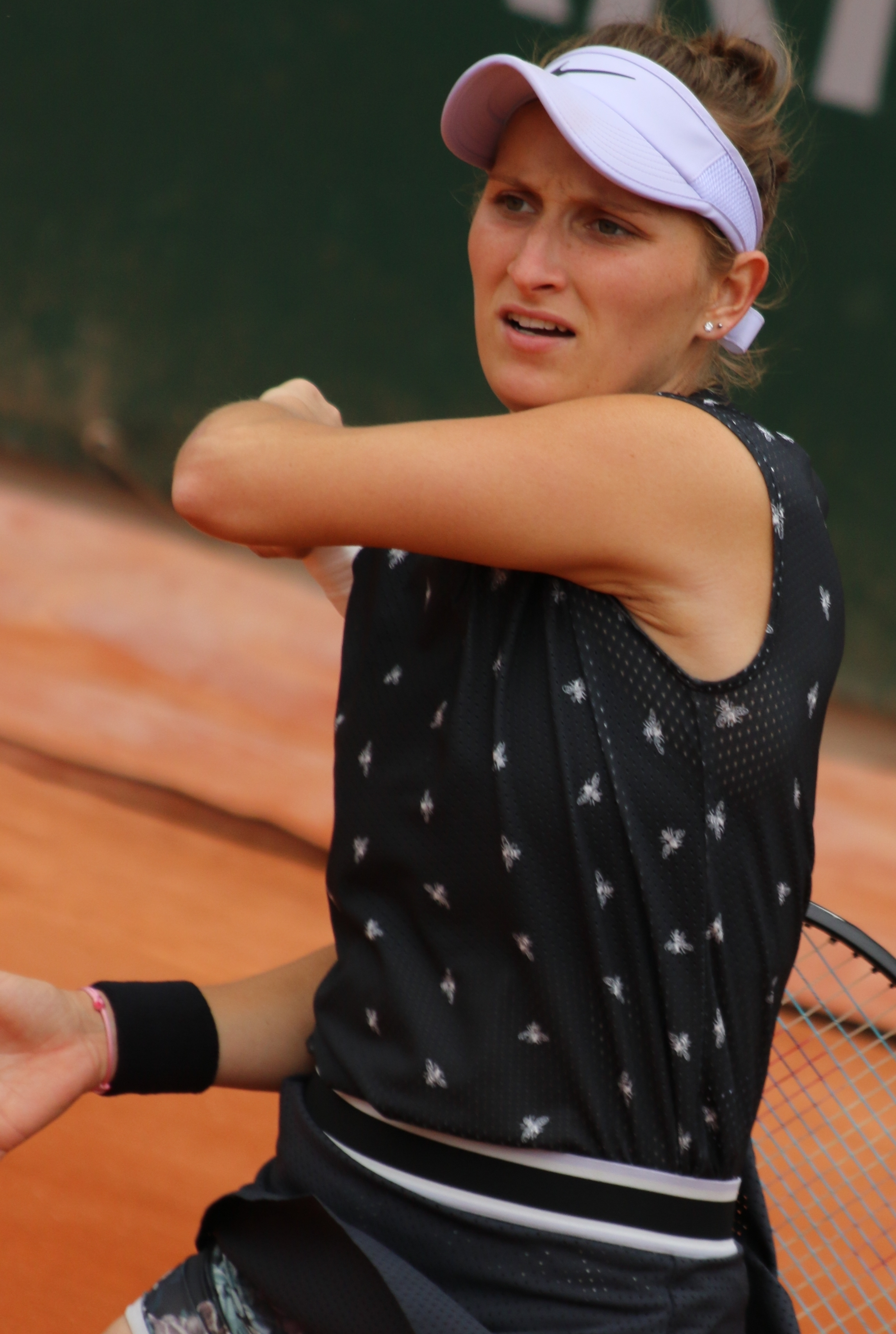
Vondroušová at the 2019 French Open

Vondroušová had a slow start into the 2018 season, not winning multiple main-draw matches at any of her first five tournaments of the year, including the Australian Open. Nonetheless, she continued to rise in the rankings to as high as No. 50, after reaching the fourth round at the Indian Wells Open, where she defeated No. 11 Johanna Konta in the second round. Once Vondroušová did not defend the ranking points from her first title during the clay court season, her ranking began to drop. She won just two matches on clay and lost her opening round match at the French Open, causing her to fall outside the top 100. She also lost in the opening round at Wimbledon. Two weeks later, Vondroušová reached her first semifinal of the year at the Ladies Championship Gstaad. Nonetheless, she remained outside the top 100 by late August. As the last direct acceptance into the main draw of the US Open, Vondroušová produced her best result of the season. She upset No. 13 Kiki Bertens in the third round in a third-set tiebreak, before losing in her next match. This result brought her back to No. 71 in the world. For the second consecutive year, she finished at No. 67, after ending her season in September.

Vondroušová had a strong start into the 2019 season. Although she lost in the second round of the Australian Open in singles, she reached semifinals in doubles with Barbora Strýcová where they lost a tight match to Samantha Stosur and Zhang Shuai. Vondroušová then reached the quarterfinals or better at each of her next six singles events. This streak included three finals appearances and began with a runner-up finish to defending champion Alison Van Uytvanck at the Hungarian Ladies Open. At the Indian Wells Open, Vondroušová upset No. 2 Simona Halep, the highest-ranked opponent she ever defeated. With quarterfinal appearances there and at the Miami Open, she returned to the top 50 for the first time in a little over a year. Vondroušová reached another final at the İstanbul Cup where she lost to No. 40, Petra Martić. She then defeated Halep again during her quarterfinal run at the Italian Open.

Vondroušová's best performance of the season came at the French Open, where she made it to the final without dropping a set. As an unseeded player, she defeated four seeded players including No. 12, Anastasija Sevastova in the fourth round and No. 26, Johanna Konta in the semifinals. She also defeated No. 31 Martić in the quarterfinals for the first time, after losing all four of their previous meetings. In the final, she lost to No. 8, Ashleigh Barty, only winning four games. Nonetheless, she became the first teenager to contest the French Open final since Ana Ivanovic in 2007 and the first to play in any Grand Slam final since Caroline Wozniacki at the 2009 US Open. She also entered top 20 for the first time. Despite this success, she lost in the opening round at Wimbledon to Madison Brengle, her last match of the year. After missing the next few months due to a left wrist injury suffered during that match, Vondroušová had surgery in September and stayed out for the rest of the season. She reached a peak ranking of No. 14 in the world during the season, and finished the year at No. 16.

=== 2021: WTA 1000 final, Olympic silver medalist ===
On her debut at the WTA 1000-level in doubles at the Italian Open, Vondroušová and partner Kristina Mladenovic reached the final, defeating second-seeded duo of Barbora Krejčíková and Kateřina Siniaková in the quarterfinals and wildcard pair Sara Errani and Irina-Camelia Begu in the semifinals. They lost their final to the alternate pair and WTA 1000-level first time winners, Giuliana Olmos and Sharon Fichman.

At the Tokyo Olympics, Vondroušová beat 16th seed Kiki Bertens, in the latter's final ever singles match on tour, and Mihaela Buzărnescu to reach the third round. Next, she upset second seed and home favourite Naomi Osaka, beating her in straight sets to advance to the quarterfinals. There, she eliminated Paula Badosa (by retirement) to advance to the semifinals, where she scored her second top-10 win in the tournament by beating Elina Svitolina to reach the final and guarantee a medal. She lost to Belinda Bencic in three sets and won the silver medal.

=== 2022: Indian Wells fourth round, surgery ===
Seeded 30th at Indian Wells, she defeated unseeded Magdalena Fręch and fourth seed Anett Kontaveit to reach the fourth round for the third time at this tournament.

=== 2023: First unseeded Wimbledon champion ===
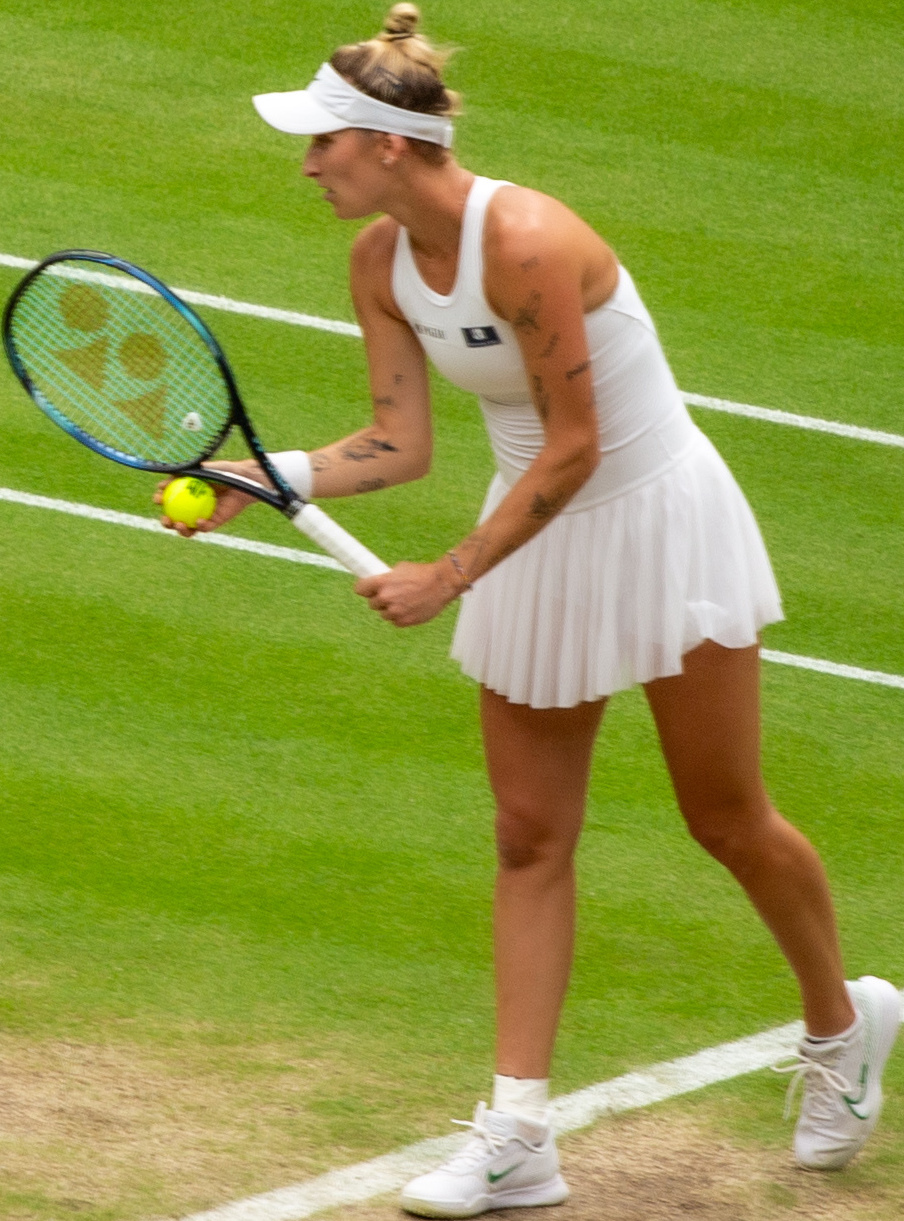
Vondroušová at the 2023 Wimbledon Championships

Using protected ranking, she reached the third rounds of the Australian Open, defeating Alison Riske and second seed Ons Jabeur, and of the Indian Wells, defeating Rebecca Marino and 28th seed Marie Bouzková. In the latter, she went one step further into the round of 16 for the fourth time at this WTA 1000 tournament defeating again fourth seed Ons Jabeur. At the Miami Open, she reached back-to-back WTA 1000 fourth rounds and for the first time since 2021 at this tournament (having skipped the 2022 edition) defeating Tatjana Maria, 11th seed Veronika Kudermetova, and 17th seed compatriot Karolína Plíšková.

At Wimbledon, she reached the fourth round for the first time at this major defeating Peyton Stearns, 12th seed Veronika Kudermetova and 20th seed Donna Vekić. With this result, she has reached the fourth round at all major tournaments. In the fourth round, she defeated 32nd seed and fellow Czech Marie Bouzková, reaching the quarterfinals of a major for the first time since the 2019 French Open. In the quarterfinals, she overcame a 1–4 third-set deficit to beat fourth seed Jessica Pegula for her first Wimbledon semifinal. She became only the third woman in the Open Era to defeat four seeds to reach the semifinals at the All England Club along with Zheng Jie (2008) and Barbora Strýcová (2019). She defeated Elina Svitolina, who had received a wildcard into the tournament, in straight sets to progress to her first Wimbledon final and second Grand Slam tournament final overall. On 15 July, she defeated Ons Jabeur in the final, becoming the first unseeded ladies' singles Wimbledon champion in the Open Era. Ranked No. 42, she also became the lowest ranked Wimbledon champion in the Open era. On 17 July 2023, she entered the top 10 in the WTA rankings.

Following reaching the quarterfinals at the US Open for the first time, she moved to a new career-high in the top 10, at world No. 6, on 11 September 2023. On 21 December 2023, Vondroušová was named "Sportsperson of the year" at the Czech Republic's 2023 Sportsperson of the Year awards.

=== 2024: French Open quarterfinals, injuries ===
Competing at the 2024 French Open, she reached the quarterfinals losing to eventual champion Iga Świątek. This was her best performance at the French Open since reaching the final in 2019.

At Wimbledon, Vondroušová was upset in the first round by world No. 83, Jéssica Bouzas Maneiro. This loss marked the second time in the Open era that the reigning Wimbledon women's singles champion lost in the first round, after Steffi Graf lost to Lori McNeil in 1994. It was also the first time that a reigning champion of any major lost in the first round since Emma Raducanu at the 2022 US Open.

On 22 July, Vondroušová announced her withdrawal from the Paris Olympics due to a hand injury which also led her to pull out of the US Open.

=== 2025: Berlin title, US Open quarterfinal ===
Six months after her previous match, Vondroušová returned to the WTA Tour at the Adelaide International, defeating Anastasia Pavlyuchenkova in the first round. Having won the opening set, she retired from her second round match against sixth seed Diana Shnaider. Vondroušová subsequently withdrew from the Australian Open.

She entered the Abu Dhabi Open in February as a wildcard player and defeated Emma Raducanu and fourth seed Yulia Putintseva to reach the quarterfinals, where she lost to Belinda Bencic.

In March, Vondroušová announced she would miss the "next few months" of the season due a shoulder injury. She was scheduled to return to competitive action at the Italian Open in May but withdrew just before the tournament began having failed to recover sufficiently to play. Two weeks later, Vondroušová made her comeback at the French Open, defeating qualifier Oksana Selekhmeteva and 25th seed Magdalena Fręch to make it through to the third round, in which she lost to third seed Jessica Pegula in three sets.

Moving onto the grass-court season at the Berlin Open, she defeated seventh seed Madison Keys, Diana Shnaider, lucky loser Ons Jabeur, and world No. 1 Aryna Sabalenka to reach the final. Vondroušová won the championship match against qualifier Wang Xinyu in three sets to claim her first title since winning Wimbledon in 2023, and returned to the top 100 at No. 73 on 23 June. Ranked No. 164, she was the lowest-ranked champion in tournament history. At Wimbledon, she defeated 32nd seed McCartney Kessler, before losing to Emma Raducanu in the second round.

Vondroušová defeated Alexandra Eala to reach the second round at the Canadian Open, where she lost to 24th seed Marta Kostyuk. She also made it through to the second round at the Cincinnati Open with a win over Jaqueline Cristian, before losing to world No. 1, Aryna Sabalenka. At the US Open, Vondroušová defeated qualifier Oksana Selekhmeteva, 32nd seed McCartney Kessler, seventh seed Jasmine Paolini and ninth seed Elena Rybakina to make it into the quarterfinals. She withdrew due to a knee injury before her last eight match against world No. 1 Aryna Sabalenka.

=== 2026: Injuries, four-year ban ===
Vondroušová started her 2026 season at the Brisbane International, losing in the first round to Magdalena Fręch in three sets. The next week at the Brisbane International, she defeated seventh seed Liudmila Samsonova, but then withdrew from the tournament before her second round match against Kimberly Birrell due to a shoulder injury, which subsequently forced her to pull out of the Australian Open.

In April, Vondroušová returned to competitive action to play doubles for the Czech Republic during their BJK Cup qualifier against Switzerland in Biel, but then withdrew from her scheduled WTA Tour return at the following week's Open de Rouen.

On 17 April, she revealed that she was under investigation for refusing a doping control test at her home, something that she denies. The International Tennis Integrity Agency (ITIA) subsequently released a statement confirming that "an investigation is underway and the player has been charged with refusing a test".

On 21 June 2026, the ITIA announced that Vondroušová had been found guilty of refusing an anti-doping test and was suspended from professional tennis for four years. The charge stemmed from an incident in December 2025, when Vondroušová denied a doping control officer entry to her home to conduct an out-of-competition test. Vondroušová had previously stated that she feared for her safety and believed the officer had failed to follow the correct procedures when arriving at her residence.

Following a hearing, an independent tribunal concluded that Vondroušová had provided "no compelling justification" for refusing the test and upheld the charge brought by the ITIA. Under the World Anti-Doping Code, refusal to submit to a doping control test carries a standard sanction of four years when no mitigating circumstances are established. The ruling resulted in Vondroušová being banned from all professional tennis activity until 21 June 2030 (one week prior to her 31st birthday). The suspension effectively ended Vondroušová's 2026 season which had already been limited because of recurring injury problems. In August 2026, it was reported that Vondroušová had submitted an appeal over the decision to the Court of Arbitration for Sport.

== National representation ==
=== Billie Jean King Cup ===
Having won the Junior Fed Cup in 2015, Vondroušova made her senior Billie Jean King Cup debut for the Czech Republic in 2017 in their World Group semifinal tie against the United States. She lost her first match against CoCo Vandeweghe, but recovered to defeat Lauren Davis to set up a decisive doubles rubber. The Czech team lost the doubles match and was eliminated. Vondroušova returned to play in the Fed Cup in 2019 for the Czech team's World Group Play-off tie against Canada. She won two of the first three singles matches as the Czech Republic swept the tie to keep them in the World Group for 2020.

=== Olympics ===
She also represented her country in the 2020 Olympics, where she upset home favorite Naomi Osaka in the third round of competition. She reached the final defeating Paula Badosa (by retirement) in the quarterfinals and fourth seed Elina Svitolina in the semifinals, booking Czech Republic's first Olympic singles final. She lost to Belinda Bencic in three sets and was awarded the silver medal.

== Playing style ==
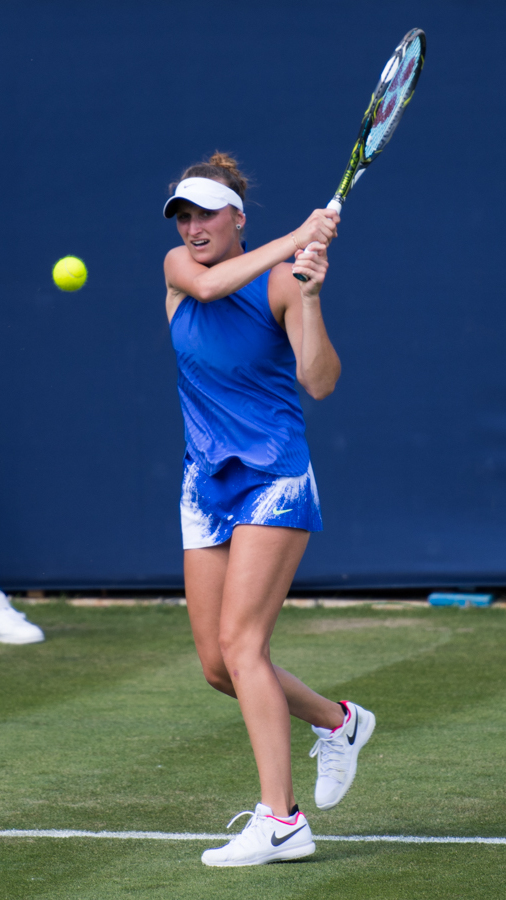
Vondroušová hitting a backhand

Vondroušová's signature shot is the drop shot. In general, she has a crafty style of play and employs a wide variety of shots. She developed this type of playing style from working with one of her early coaches Jan Fuchs, who played the same way. Her game often includes long, strategic rallies in which she makes use of her left-handed topspin forehand. Vondroušová has said, "I'm just trying to play aggressive and maybe, like, mix the points, and I just want to serve well and move well." Her favorite surface is clay, the surface she grew up playing on. She also likes hard courts because of her playing style. Vondroušová excels in her return game more than her service game. In 2019, she led the WTA Tour in first serve points won on return among players with at least ten matches, winning 43.4% of them. She was also first in percentage of return games won and percentage of return points won overall.

== Coaches ==
As a junior, Vondroušová was coached by Jan Fuchs starting from before the age of 12. Her stepfather Tomáš Anderle, who is a hockey coach, served as her physical fitness trainer. She was later coached by Zdeněk Kubík for three years. By 2015, she replaced Kubík with Jiří Hřebec and Dušan Karol. Hřebec is a former Czech professional player who reached a career-high ranking of No. 25 in the world on the ATP Tour. Vondroušová switched coaches from Hřebec to Martin Fassati in April 2018. After a lack of success with Fassati, she switched coaches again a few months later to Jan Hernych, another Czech former ATP professional player. She also later resumed working with Hřebec. Hernych serves as her only traveling coach since Hřebec does not travel to tournaments.

== Personal life ==
In July 2022, she married her longtime partner Štěpán Šimek. They had been engaged since the 2020 Olympics, where Vondroušová won the silver medal. They divorced in 2024. A few months after divorce, Vondroušová confirmed a relationship with Czech tennis player Andrew Paulson.

In 2024, the Czech edition of Forbes featured Vondroušová in their "30 Under 30" list.

== Career statistics ==
=== Grand Slam performance timelines ===
Key
W	F	SF	QF	#R	RR	Q#	DNQ	A	NH

(W) winner; (F) finalist; (SF) semifinalist; (QF) quarterfinalist; (#R) rounds 4, 3, 2, 1; (RR) round-robin stage; (Q#) qualification round; (DNQ) did not qualify; (A) absent; (NH) not held; (SR) strike rate (events won / competed); (W–L) win–loss record.
To avoid confusion and double counting, these charts are updated at the conclusion of a tournament or when the player's participation has ended.

==== Singles ====
Tournament	2017	2018	2019	2020	2021	2022	2023	2024	2025	SR	W–L	Win %
Australian Open	A	2R	2R	1R	4R	3R	3R	1R	A	0 / 7	9–7	56%
French Open	2R	1R	F	1R	4R	A	2R	QF	3R	0 / 8	17–8	68%
Wimbledon	1R	1R	1R	NH	2R	A	W	1R	2R	1 / 7	9–6	60%
US Open	1R	4R	A	2R	2R	A	QF	A	QF (Note: Vondroušová withdrew before the quarterfinals of the 2025 US Open women's singles; this withdrawal is not counted as a loss.)	0 / 6	13–5	72%
Win–loss	1–3	4–4	7–3	1–3	8–4	2–1	14–3	4–3	7–2	1 / 28	48–26	65%

==== Doubles ====
Tournament	2017	2018	2019	2020	2021	2022	2023	SR	W–L	Win %
Australian Open	A	1R	SF	1R	2R	2R	3R	0 / 6	8–6	57%
French Open	A	1R	2R	A	A	A	2R	0 / 3	2–3	40%
Wimbledon	QF	1R	A	NH	2R	A	3R (Note: Vondroušová and her partner withdrew before the 3rd round of both the 2023 Wimbledon women's doubles and the 2023 US Open women's doubles; these withdrawals are not counted as losses.)	0 / 4	6–3	67%
US Open	1R	A	A	A	2R	A	3R	0 / 3	3–2	60%
Win–loss	3–2	0–3	5–2	0–1	3–3	1–1	7–2	0 / 16	19–14	58%

=== Grand Slam tournament finals ===
==== Singles: 2 (1 title, 1 runner-up) ====
Result	Year	Championship	Surface	Opponent	Score
Loss	2019	French Open	Clay	(Australia) Ashleigh Barty	1–6, 3–6
Win	2023	Wimbledon	Grass	(Tunisia) Ons Jabeur	6–4, 6–4

=== Summer Olympics ===
==== Singles: 1 (silver medal) ====
Result	Year	Location	Surface	Opponent	Score
Silver	2021	Tokyo Olympics	Hard	(Switzerland) Belinda Bencic	5–7, 6–2, 3–6

== Notes ==
Awards
Preceded by Ester Ledecká	Czech Athlete of the Year; 2023	Succeeded by Josef Dostál
