= 2019 WTA Tour =

Women's tennis circuit

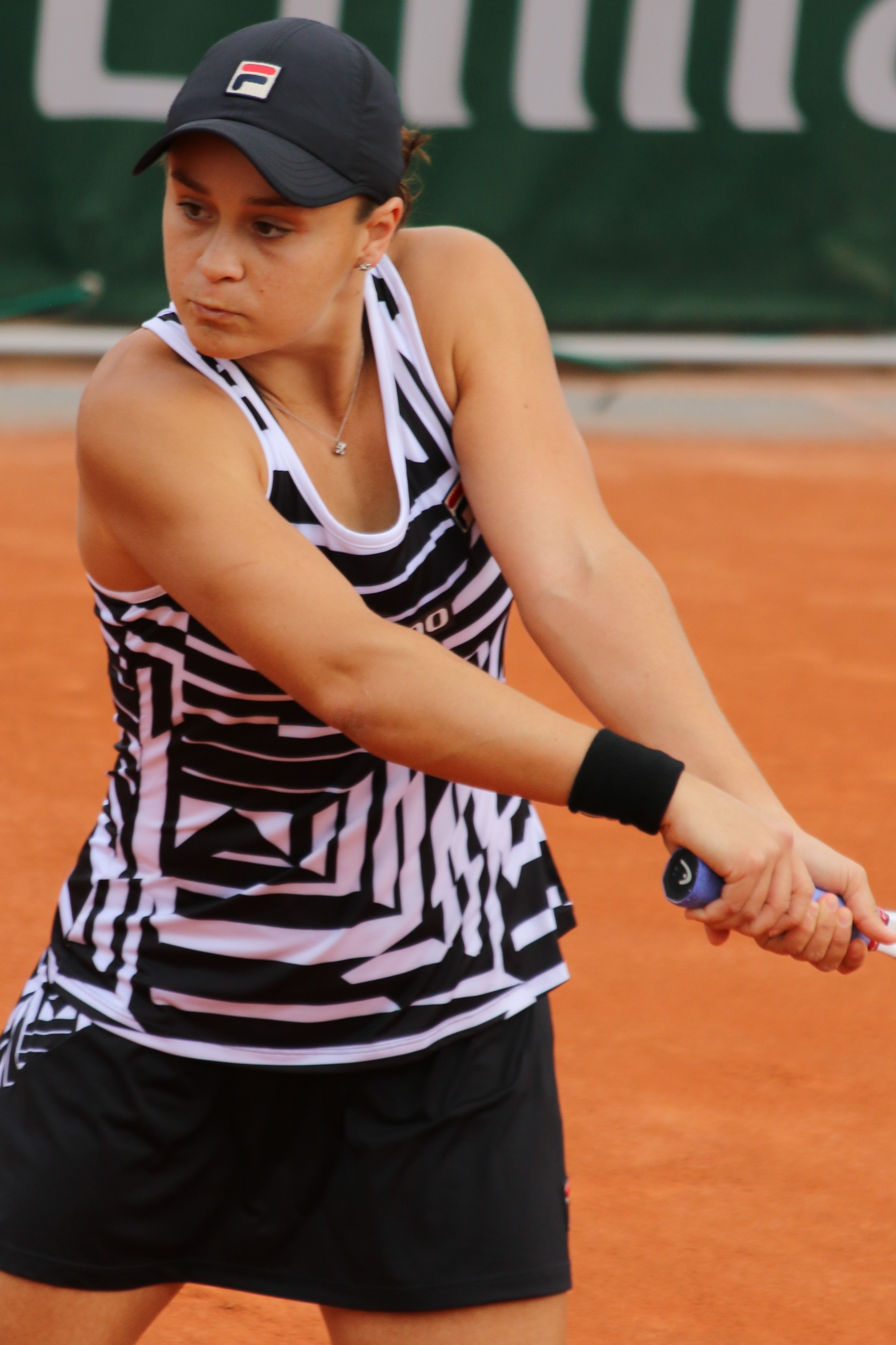
- Ashleigh Barty finished the year as world No. 1 for the first time in her career. She won four tournaments during the season, including a major at the French Open, as well as the WTA Finals. She also won a Premier Mandatory event.

Details
- Duration: 29 December 2018 – 3 November 2019
- Edition: 49th
- Tournaments: 58
- Categories: Grand Slam (4); WTA Finals; WTA Premier Mandatory (4); WTA Premier 5 (5); WTA Premier (12); WTA International (31); WTA Elite Trophy

Achievements (singles)
- Most titles: (Australia) Ashleigh Barty (Czech Republic) Karolína Plíšková (4)
- Most finals: (Australia) Ashleigh Barty (6)
- Prize money leader: (Australia) Ashleigh Barty ($11,307,587)
- Points leader: (Australia) Ashleigh Barty (7,851)

Awards
- Player of the year: (Australia) Ashleigh Barty
- Doubles team of the year: (Hungary) Tímea Babos (France) Kristina Mladenovic
- Most improved player of the year: (United States) Sofia Kenin
- Newcomer of the year: (Canada) Bianca Andreescu
- Comeback player of the year: (Switzerland) Belinda Bencic

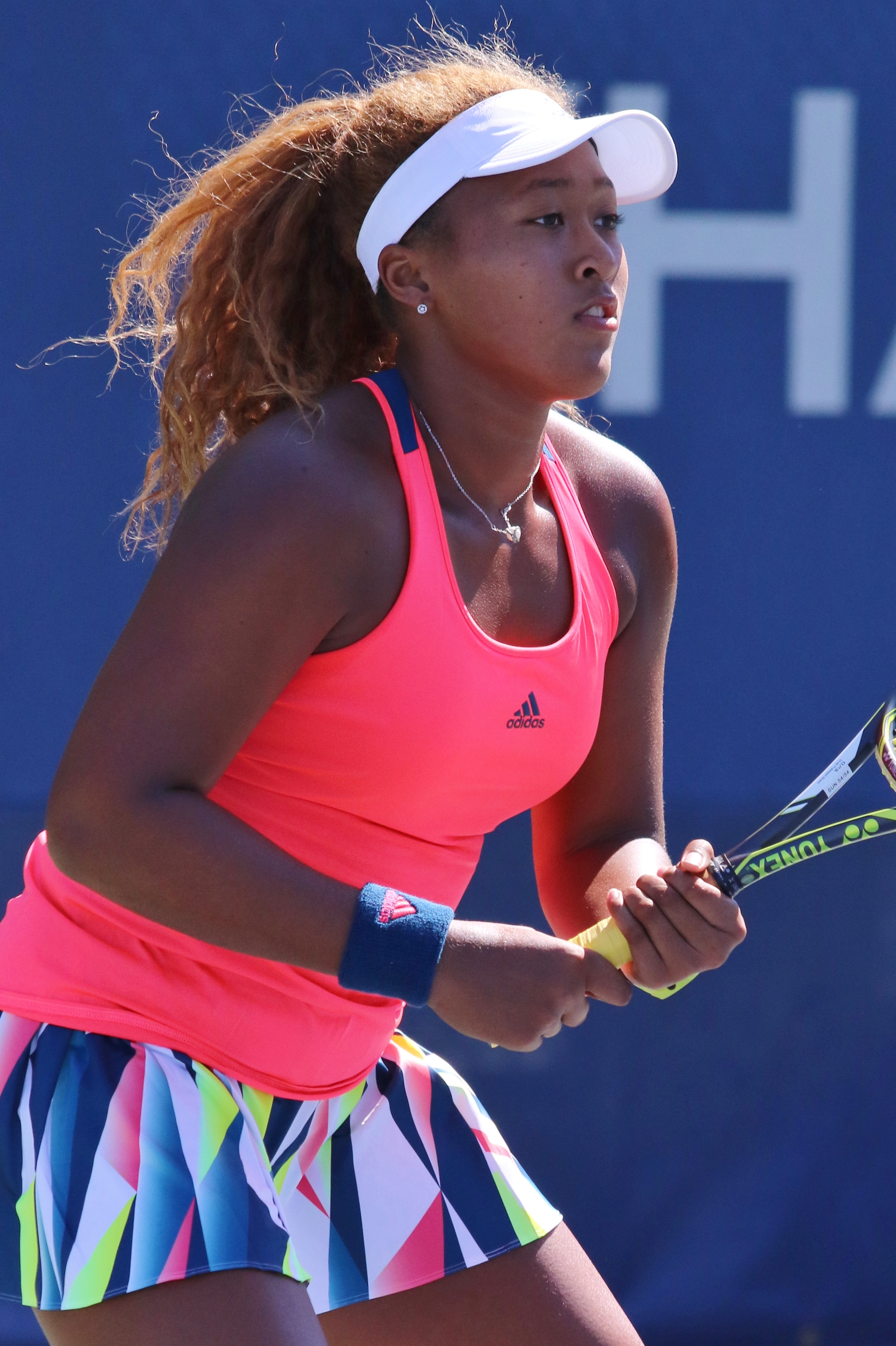
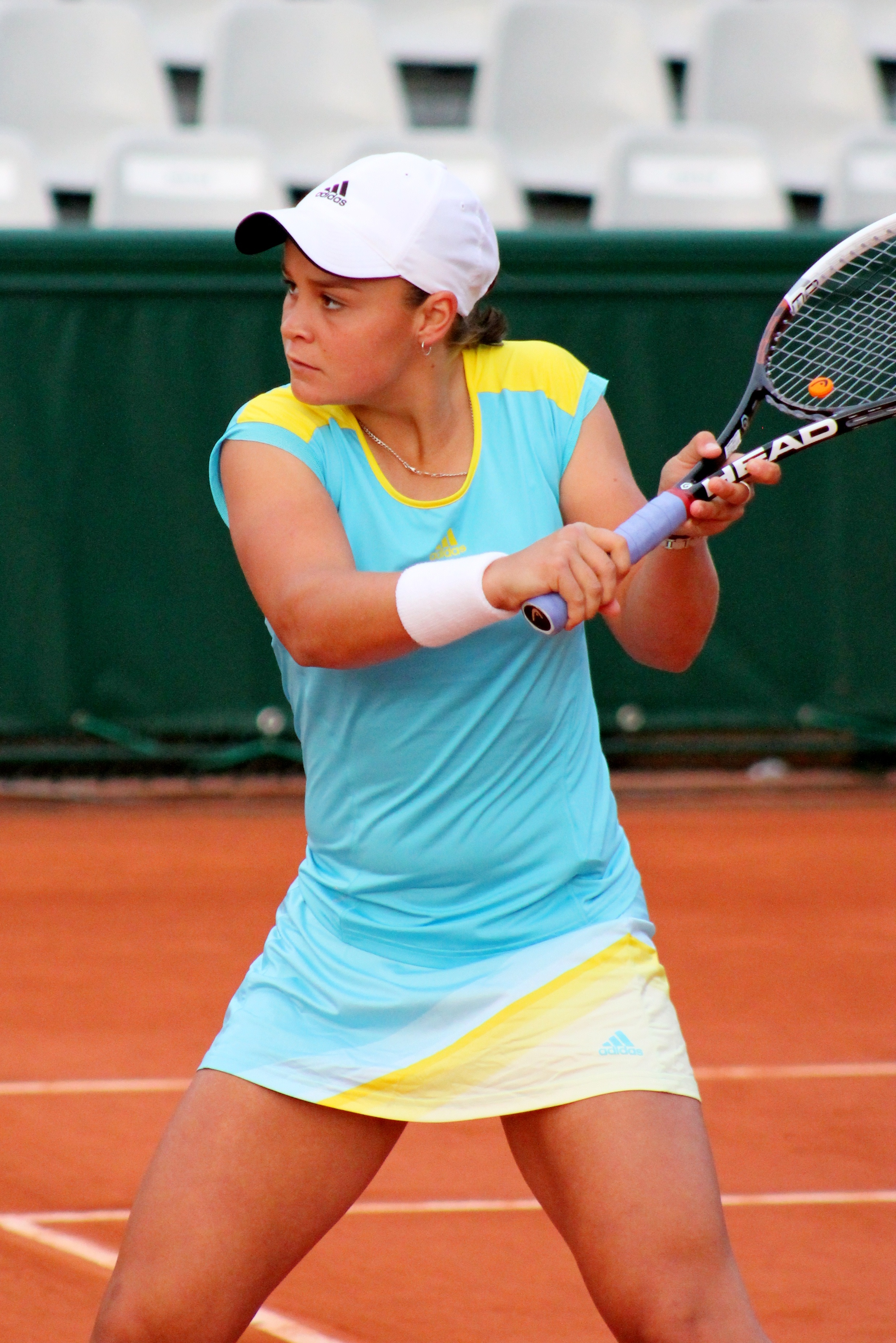
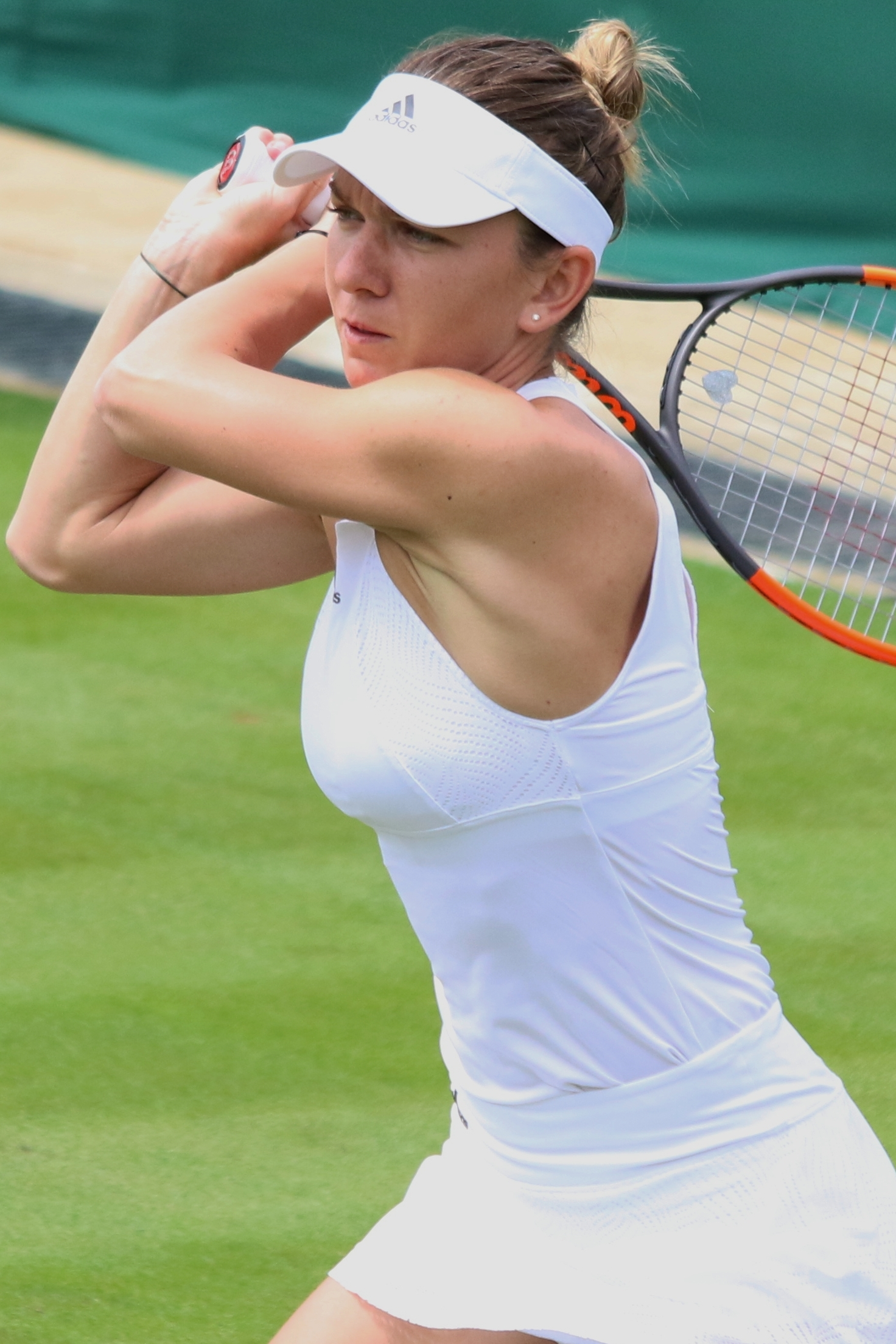
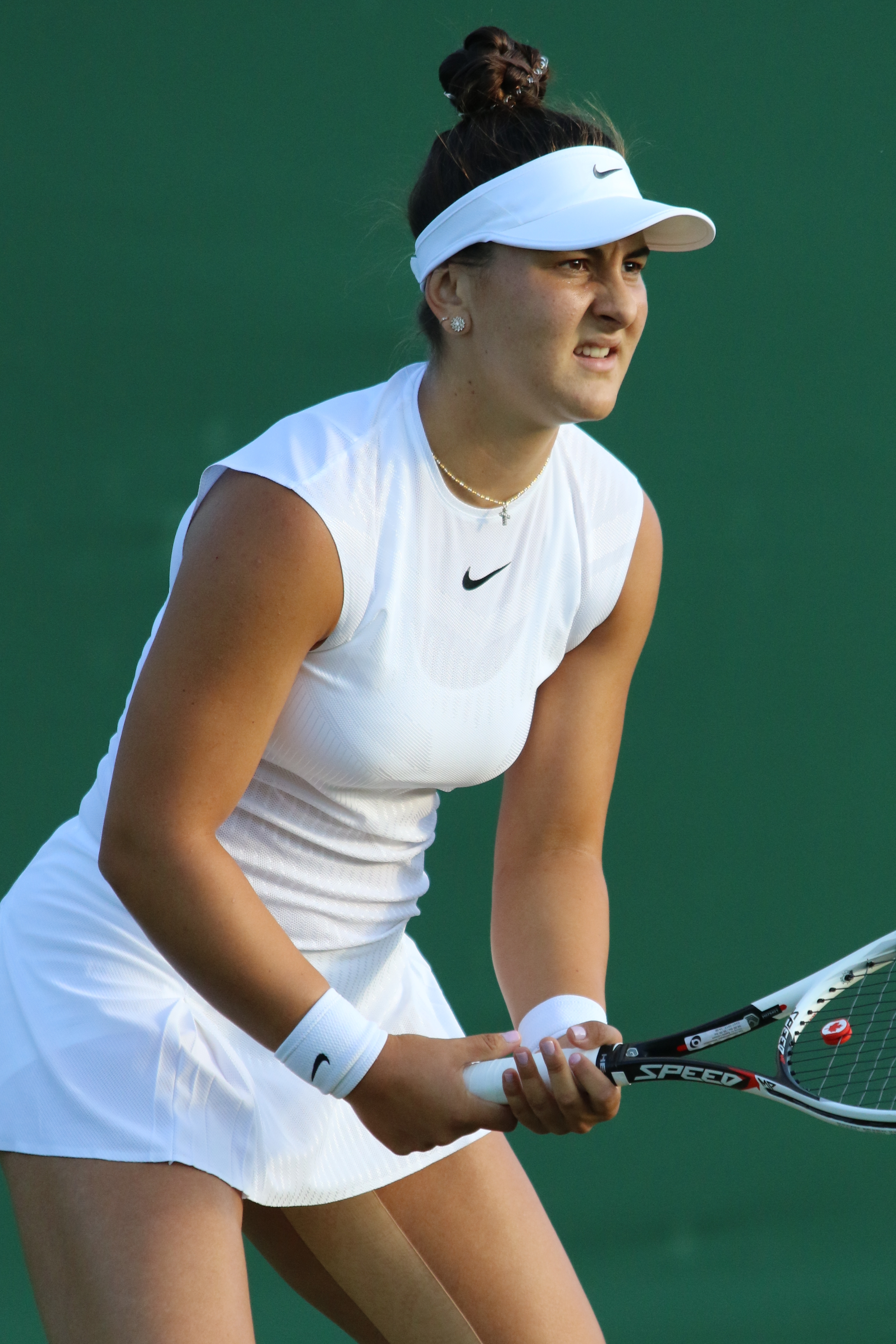
Naomi Osaka won her second consecutive major title at the Australian Open and took over the world No. 1 ranking, the first Asian player ever to hold the top spot. Ashleigh Barty won her first major title at the French Open and soon afterwards overtook Osaka to become No. 1. Simona Halep won her second major at Wimbledon, the first Romanian to win there. Bianca Andreescu won her first major title at the US Open, defeating Serena Williams in the final. She became the first Canadian, as well as the first player born in the 2000s, to win a major singles title. 2019 marked the first, and so far only, time in history that the four majors were won by players representing four different continents (Osaka–Asia, Barty–Australia, Halep–Europe and Andreescu–North America).

The 2019 WTA Tour was the elite professional tennis circuit organised by the Women's Tennis Association (WTA) for the 2019 tennis season. The 2019 WTA Tour calendar was composed of the Grand Slam tournaments (supervised by the International Tennis Federation (ITF), the WTA Premier tournaments (Premier Mandatory, Premier 5, and regular Premier), the WTA International tournaments, the Fed Cup (organized by the ITF), and the year-end championships (the WTA Tour Championships and the WTA Elite Trophy). The Hopman Cup, organized by the ITF, also is included but did not distribute ranking points.

Prior to the season, the WTA announced usage of a shot clock at all Premier events. Players had a minute to get on court, five minutes to warm up, and one minute to start the match. The time allotted to players in between points was increased from 20 to 25 seconds. Finally, players were allowed only one toilet break in a match.

== Schedule ==
This is the complete schedule of events on the 2019 calendar, with player progression documented from the quarterfinals stage.

Key

Grand Slam tournaments
Year-end championships
WTA Premier Mandatory
WTA Premier 5
WTA Premier
WTA International
Team events

=== January ===
Week	Tournament	Champions	Runners-up	Semifinalists	Quarterfinalists
31 Dec	Hopman Cup; Perth, Australia; ITF Mixed Teams Championships; Hard (i) – 8 teams (RR)	Switzerland; 2–1	Germany	Round robin (Group A) Australia; Spain; France	Round robin (Group B) Greece; Great Britain; United States
31 Dec	Brisbane International; Brisbane, Australia; WTA Premier $1,000,000 – hard – 30S/32Q/16D; Singles – Doubles	(Czech Republic) Karolína Plíšková; 4–6, 7–5, 6–2	(Ukraine) Lesia Tsurenko	(Croatia) Donna Vekić (Japan) Naomi Osaka	(Belarus) Aliaksandra Sasnovich (Australia) Ajla Tomljanović (Estonia) Anett Kontaveit (Latvia) Anastasija Sevastova
31 Dec	Brisbane International; Brisbane, Australia; WTA Premier $1,000,000 – hard – 30S/32Q/16D; Singles – Doubles	(United States) Nicole Melichar (Czech Republic) Květa Peschke; 6–1, 6–1	(Chinese Taipei) Chan Hao-ching (Chinese Taipei) Latisha Chan	(Croatia) Donna Vekić (Japan) Naomi Osaka	(Belarus) Aliaksandra Sasnovich (Australia) Ajla Tomljanović (Estonia) Anett Kontaveit (Latvia) Anastasija Sevastova
31 Dec	Shenzhen Open; Shenzhen, China; WTA International; Hard – $750,000 – 32S/16Q/16D; Singles – Doubles	(Belarus) Aryna Sabalenka; 4–6, 7–6^{(7–2)}, 6–3	(United States) Alison Riske	(China) Wang Yafan (Russia) Vera Zvonareva	(Russia) Maria Sharapova (Romania) Monica Niculescu (Romania) Sorana Cîrstea (Russia) Veronika Kudermetova
31 Dec	Shenzhen Open; Shenzhen, China; WTA International; Hard – $750,000 – 32S/16Q/16D; Singles – Doubles	(China) Peng Shuai (China) Yang Zhaoxuan; 6–4, 6–3	(China) Duan Yingying (Czech Republic) Renata Voráčová	(China) Wang Yafan (Russia) Vera Zvonareva	(Russia) Maria Sharapova (Romania) Monica Niculescu (Romania) Sorana Cîrstea (Russia) Veronika Kudermetova
31 Dec	Auckland Open; Auckland, New Zealand; WTA International; Hard – $250,000 – 32S/32Q/16D; Singles – Doubles	(Germany) Julia Görges; 2–6, 7–5, 6–1	(Canada) Bianca Andreescu	(Chinese Taipei) Hsieh Su-wei (Slovakia) Viktória Kužmová	(United States) Venus Williams (Spain) Sara Sorribes Tormo (United States) Amanda Anisimova (Canada) Eugenie Bouchard
31 Dec	Auckland Open; Auckland, New Zealand; WTA International; Hard – $250,000 – 32S/32Q/16D; Singles – Doubles	(Canada) Eugenie Bouchard (United States) Sofia Kenin; 1–6, 6–1, [10–7]	(New Zealand) Paige Hourigan (United States) Taylor Townsend	(Chinese Taipei) Hsieh Su-wei (Slovakia) Viktória Kužmová	(United States) Venus Williams (Spain) Sara Sorribes Tormo (United States) Amanda Anisimova (Canada) Eugenie Bouchard
7 Jan	Sydney International; Sydney, Australia; WTA Premier; Hard – $823,000 – 30S/24Q/16D; Singles – Doubles	(Czech Republic) Petra Kvitová; 1–6, 7–5, 7–6^{(7–3)}	(Australia) Ashleigh Barty	(Netherlands) Kiki Bertens (Belarus) Aliaksandra Sasnovich	(Belgium) Elise Mertens (Kazakhstan) Yulia Putintseva (Switzerland) Timea Bacsinszky (Germany) Angelique Kerber
7 Jan	Sydney International; Sydney, Australia; WTA Premier; Hard – $823,000 – 30S/24Q/16D; Singles – Doubles	(Serbia) Aleksandra Krunić (Czech Republic) Kateřina Siniaková; 6–1, 7–6^{(7–3)}	(Japan) Eri Hozumi (Poland) Alicja Rosolska	(Netherlands) Kiki Bertens (Belarus) Aliaksandra Sasnovich	(Belgium) Elise Mertens (Kazakhstan) Yulia Putintseva (Switzerland) Timea Bacsinszky (Germany) Angelique Kerber
7 Jan	Hobart International; Hobart, Australia; WTA International; Hard – $250,000 – 32S/24Q/16D; Singles – Doubles	(United States) Sofia Kenin; 6–3, 6–0	(Slovakia) Anna Karolína Schmiedlová	(France) Alizé Cornet (Switzerland) Belinda Bencic	(Belgium) Kirsten Flipkens (Belgium) Greet Minnen (Romania) Irina-Camelia Begu (Ukraine) Dayana Yastremska
7 Jan	Hobart International; Hobart, Australia; WTA International; Hard – $250,000 – 32S/24Q/16D; Singles – Doubles	(Chinese Taipei) Chan Hao-ching (Chinese Taipei) Latisha Chan; 6–3, 3–6, [10–6]	(Belgium) Kirsten Flipkens (Sweden) Johanna Larsson	(France) Alizé Cornet (Switzerland) Belinda Bencic	(Belgium) Kirsten Flipkens (Belgium) Greet Minnen (Romania) Irina-Camelia Begu (Ukraine) Dayana Yastremska
14 Jan; 21 Jan	Australian Open; Melbourne, Australia; Grand Slam; Hard – A$28,814,100; 128S/128Q/64D/32X; Singles – Doubles – Mixed doubles	(Japan) Naomi Osaka; 7–6^{(7–2)}, 5–7, 6–4	(Czech Republic) Petra Kvitová	(Czech Republic) Karolína Plíšková (United States) Danielle Collins	(United States) Serena Williams (Ukraine) Elina Svitolina (Australia) Ashleigh Barty (Russia) Anastasia Pavlyuchenkova
14 Jan; 21 Jan	Australian Open; Melbourne, Australia; Grand Slam; Hard – A$28,814,100; 128S/128Q/64D/32X; Singles – Doubles – Mixed doubles	(Australia) Samantha Stosur (China) Zhang Shuai; 6–3, 6–4	(Hungary) Tímea Babos (France) Kristina Mladenovic	(Czech Republic) Karolína Plíšková (United States) Danielle Collins	(United States) Serena Williams (Ukraine) Elina Svitolina (Australia) Ashleigh Barty (Russia) Anastasia Pavlyuchenkova
14 Jan; 21 Jan	Australian Open; Melbourne, Australia; Grand Slam; Hard – A$28,814,100; 128S/128Q/64D/32X; Singles – Doubles – Mixed doubles	(Czech Republic) Barbora Krejčíková (United States) Rajeev Ram; 7–6^{(7–3)}, 6–1	(Australia) Astra Sharma (Australia) John-Patrick Smith	(Czech Republic) Karolína Plíšková (United States) Danielle Collins	(United States) Serena Williams (Ukraine) Elina Svitolina (Australia) Ashleigh Barty (Russia) Anastasia Pavlyuchenkova
28 Jan	St. Petersburg Ladies Trophy; Saint Petersburg, Russia; WTA Premier; Hard (i) – $823,000 – 28S/32Q/16D; Singles – Doubles	(Netherlands) Kiki Bertens; 7–6^{(7–2)}, 6–4	(Croatia) Donna Vekić	(Russia) Vera Zvonareva (Belarus) Aryna Sabalenka	(Czech Republic) Petra Kvitová (Russia) Daria Kasatkina (Russia) Ekaterina Alexandrova (Russia) Anastasia Pavlyuchenkova
28 Jan	St. Petersburg Ladies Trophy; Saint Petersburg, Russia; WTA Premier; Hard (i) – $823,000 – 28S/32Q/16D; Singles – Doubles	(Russia) Margarita Gasparyan (Russia) Ekaterina Makarova; 7–5, 7–5	(Russia) Anna Kalinskaya (Slovakia) Viktória Kužmová	(Russia) Vera Zvonareva (Belarus) Aryna Sabalenka	(Czech Republic) Petra Kvitová (Russia) Daria Kasatkina (Russia) Ekaterina Alexandrova (Russia) Anastasia Pavlyuchenkova
28 Jan	Thailand Open; Hua Hin, Thailand; WTA International; Hard – $250,000 – 32S/24Q/16D; Singles – Doubles	(Ukraine) Dayana Yastremska; 6–2, 2–6, 7–6^{(7–3)}	(Australia) Ajla Tomljanović	(Poland) Magda Linette (Slovenia) Tamara Zidanšek	(Spain) Garbiñe Muguruza (China) Wang Yafan (China) Zheng Saisai (Switzerland) Viktorija Golubic
28 Jan	Thailand Open; Hua Hin, Thailand; WTA International; Hard – $250,000 – 32S/24Q/16D; Singles – Doubles	(Romania) Irina-Camelia Begu (Romania) Monica Niculescu; 2–6, 6–1, [12–10]	(Russia) Anna Blinkova (China) Wang Yafan	(Poland) Magda Linette (Slovenia) Tamara Zidanšek	(Spain) Garbiñe Muguruza (China) Wang Yafan (China) Zheng Saisai (Switzerland) Viktorija Golubic

=== February ===
Week	Tournament	Champions	Runners-up	Semifinalists	Quarterfinalists
4 Feb	Fed Cup Quarterfinals; Ostrava, Czech Republic – hard (i); Liège, Belgium – hard (i); Braunschweig, Germany – hard (i); Asheville, United States – hard (i)	Quarterfinals winners: Romania 3–2; France 3–1; Belarus 4–0; Australia 3–2	Quarterfinals losers: Czech Republic; Belgium; Germany; United States		
11 Feb	Qatar Open; Doha, Qatar; WTA Premier; Hard – $916,131 – 28S/32Q/16D; Singles – Doubles	(Belgium) Elise Mertens; 3–6, 6–4, 6–3	(Romania) Simona Halep	(Ukraine) Elina Svitolina (Germany) Angelique Kerber	(Germany) Julia Görges (Czech Republic) Karolína Muchová (Czech Republic) Barbora Strýcová (Netherlands) Kiki Bertens
11 Feb	Qatar Open; Doha, Qatar; WTA Premier; Hard – $916,131 – 28S/32Q/16D; Singles – Doubles	(Chinese Taipei) Chan Hao-ching (Chinese Taipei) Latisha Chan; 6–1, 3–6, [10–6]	(Germany) Anna-Lena Grönefeld (Netherlands) Demi Schuurs	(Ukraine) Elina Svitolina (Germany) Angelique Kerber	(Germany) Julia Görges (Czech Republic) Karolína Muchová (Czech Republic) Barbora Strýcová (Netherlands) Kiki Bertens
18 Feb	Dubai Tennis Championships; Dubai, United Arab Emirates; WTA Premier 5 Hard – $2,828,000 – 56S/32Q/28D; Singles – Doubles	(Switzerland) Belinda Bencic; 6–3, 1–6, 6–2	(Czech Republic) Petra Kvitová	(Ukraine) Elina Svitolina (Chinese Taipei) Hsieh Su-wei	(Spain) Carla Suárez Navarro (Romania) Simona Halep (Czech Republic) Karolína Plíšková (Slovakia) Viktória Kužmová
18 Feb	Dubai Tennis Championships; Dubai, United Arab Emirates; WTA Premier 5 Hard – $2,828,000 – 56S/32Q/28D; Singles – Doubles	(Chinese Taipei) Hsieh Su-wei (Czech Republic) Barbora Strýcová; 6–4, 6–4	(Czech Republic) Lucie Hradecká (Russia) Ekaterina Makarova	(Ukraine) Elina Svitolina (Chinese Taipei) Hsieh Su-wei	(Spain) Carla Suárez Navarro (Romania) Simona Halep (Czech Republic) Karolína Plíšková (Slovakia) Viktória Kužmová
18 Feb	Hungarian Ladies Open; Budapest, Hungary; WTA International; Hard (i) – $250,000 – 32S/24Q/16D; Singles – Doubles	(Belgium) Alison Van Uytvanck; 1–6, 7–5, 6–2	(Czech Republic) Markéta Vondroušová	(Russia) Ekaterina Alexandrova (Russia) Anastasia Potapova	(Ukraine) Kateryna Kozlova (France) Pauline Parmentier (Romania) Sorana Cîrstea (Romania) Irina-Camelia Begu
18 Feb	Hungarian Ladies Open; Budapest, Hungary; WTA International; Hard (i) – $250,000 – 32S/24Q/16D; Singles – Doubles	(Russia) Ekaterina Alexandrova (Russia) Vera Zvonareva; 6–4, 4–6, [10–7]	(Hungary) Fanny Stollár (United Kingdom) Heather Watson	(Russia) Ekaterina Alexandrova (Russia) Anastasia Potapova	(Ukraine) Kateryna Kozlova (France) Pauline Parmentier (Romania) Sorana Cîrstea (Romania) Irina-Camelia Begu
25 Feb	Mexican Open; Acapulco, Mexico; WTA International; Hard – $250,000 – 32S/24Q/16D; Singles – Doubles	(China) Wang Yafan; 2–6, 6–3, 7–5	(United States) Sofia Kenin	(Croatia) Donna Vekić (Canada) Bianca Andreescu	(Brazil) Beatriz Haddad Maia (United Kingdom) Johanna Konta (China) Zheng Saisai (Belarus) Victoria Azarenka
25 Feb	Mexican Open; Acapulco, Mexico; WTA International; Hard – $250,000 – 32S/24Q/16D; Singles – Doubles	(Belarus) Victoria Azarenka (China) Zheng Saisai; 6–1, 6–2	(United States) Desirae Krawczyk (Mexico) Giuliana Olmos	(Croatia) Donna Vekić (Canada) Bianca Andreescu	(Brazil) Beatriz Haddad Maia (United Kingdom) Johanna Konta (China) Zheng Saisai (Belarus) Victoria Azarenka

=== March ===
Week	Tournament	Champions	Runners-up	Semifinalists	Quarterfinalists
4 Mar; 11 Mar	Indian Wells Open; Indian Wells, United States; WTA Premier Mandatory; Hard – $9,035,428 – 96S/48Q/32D; Singles – Doubles	(Canada) Bianca Andreescu; 6–4, 3–6, 6–4	(Germany) Angelique Kerber	(Switzerland) Belinda Bencic (Ukraine) Elina Svitolina	(Czech Republic) Karolína Plíšková (United States) Venus Williams (Spain) Garbiñe Muguruza (Czech Republic) Markéta Vondroušová
4 Mar; 11 Mar	Indian Wells Open; Indian Wells, United States; WTA Premier Mandatory; Hard – $9,035,428 – 96S/48Q/32D; Singles – Doubles	(Belgium) Elise Mertens (Belarus) Aryna Sabalenka; 6–3, 6–2	(Czech Republic) Barbora Krejčíková (Czech Republic) Kateřina Siniaková	(Switzerland) Belinda Bencic (Ukraine) Elina Svitolina	(Czech Republic) Karolína Plíšková (United States) Venus Williams (Spain) Garbiñe Muguruza (Czech Republic) Markéta Vondroušová
18 Mar; 25 Mar	Miami Open; Key Biscayne, United States; WTA Premier Mandatory; Hard – $9,035,428 – 96S/48Q/32D; Singles – Doubles	(Australia) Ashleigh Barty; 7–6^{(7–1)}, 6–3	(Czech Republic) Karolína Plíšková	(Estonia) Anett Kontaveit (Romania) Simona Halep	(Chinese Taipei) Hsieh Su-wei (Czech Republic) Petra Kvitová (Czech Republic) Markéta Vondroušová (China) Wang Qiang
18 Mar; 25 Mar	Miami Open; Key Biscayne, United States; WTA Premier Mandatory; Hard – $9,035,428 – 96S/48Q/32D; Singles – Doubles	(Belgium) Elise Mertens (Belarus) Aryna Sabalenka; 7–6^{(7–5)}, 6–2	(Australia) Samantha Stosur (China) Zhang Shuai	(Estonia) Anett Kontaveit (Romania) Simona Halep	(Chinese Taipei) Hsieh Su-wei (Czech Republic) Petra Kvitová (Czech Republic) Markéta Vondroušová (China) Wang Qiang

=== April ===
Week	Tournament	Champions	Runners-up	Semifinalists	Quarterfinalists
1 Apr	Charleston Open; Charleston, United States; WTA Premier; Clay – $823,000 (Green) – 56S/32Q/16D; Singles – Doubles	(United States) Madison Keys; 7–6^{(7–5)}, 6–3	(Denmark) Caroline Wozniacki	(Puerto Rico) Monica Puig (Croatia) Petra Martić	(United States) Sloane Stephens (United States) Danielle Collins (Switzerland) Belinda Bencic (Greece) Maria Sakkari
1 Apr	Charleston Open; Charleston, United States; WTA Premier; Clay – $823,000 (Green) – 56S/32Q/16D; Singles – Doubles	(Germany) Anna-Lena Grönefeld (Poland) Alicja Rosolska; 7–6^{(9–7)}, 6–2	(Russia) Irina Khromacheva (Russia) Veronika Kudermetova	(Puerto Rico) Monica Puig (Croatia) Petra Martić	(United States) Sloane Stephens (United States) Danielle Collins (Switzerland) Belinda Bencic (Greece) Maria Sakkari
1 Apr	Monterrey Open; Monterrey, Mexico; WTA International; Hard – $250,000 – 32S/32Q/16D; Singles – Doubles	(Spain) Garbiñe Muguruza; 6–1, 3–1 ret.	(Belarus) Victoria Azarenka	(Germany) Angelique Kerber (Slovakia) Magdaléna Rybáriková	(Belgium) Kirsten Flipkens (Russia) Anastasia Pavlyuchenkova (United States) Sachia Vickery (France) Kristina Mladenovic
1 Apr	Monterrey Open; Monterrey, Mexico; WTA International; Hard – $250,000 – 32S/32Q/16D; Singles – Doubles	(United States) Asia Muhammad (United States) Maria Sanchez; 7–6^{(7–2)}, 6–4	(Australia) Monique Adamczak (Australia) Jessica Moore	(Germany) Angelique Kerber (Slovakia) Magdaléna Rybáriková	(Belgium) Kirsten Flipkens (Russia) Anastasia Pavlyuchenkova (United States) Sachia Vickery (France) Kristina Mladenovic
8 Apr	Ladies Open Lugano; Lugano, Switzerland; WTA International; Clay – $250,000 (red) – 32S/24Q/16D; Singles – Doubles	(Slovenia) Polona Hercog; 6–3, 3–6, 6–3	(Poland) Iga Świątek	(Czech Republic) Kristýna Plíšková (France) Fiona Ferro	(Russia) Svetlana Kuznetsova (Belarus) Vera Lapko (Switzerland) Stefanie Vögele (Russia) Veronika Kudermetova
8 Apr	Ladies Open Lugano; Lugano, Switzerland; WTA International; Clay – $250,000 (red) – 32S/24Q/16D; Singles – Doubles	(Romania) Sorana Cîrstea (Romania) Andreea Mitu; 1–6, 6–2, [10–8]	(Russia) Veronika Kudermetova (Kazakhstan) Galina Voskoboeva	(Czech Republic) Kristýna Plíšková (France) Fiona Ferro	(Russia) Svetlana Kuznetsova (Belarus) Vera Lapko (Switzerland) Stefanie Vögele (Russia) Veronika Kudermetova
8 Apr	Copa Colsanitas; Bogotá, Colombia; WTA International; Clay – $250,000 (red) – 32S/24Q/16D; Singles – Doubles	(United States) Amanda Anisimova; 4–6, 6–4, 6–1	(Australia) Astra Sharma	(Brazil) Beatriz Haddad Maia (Spain) Lara Arruabarrena	(Colombia) Camila Osorio (Spain) Sara Sorribes Tormo (Slovenia) Tamara Zidanšek (Italy) Sara Errani
8 Apr	Copa Colsanitas; Bogotá, Colombia; WTA International; Clay – $250,000 (red) – 32S/24Q/16D; Singles – Doubles	(Australia) Zoe Hives (Australia) Astra Sharma; 6–1, 6–2	(United States) Hayley Carter (United States) Ena Shibahara	(Brazil) Beatriz Haddad Maia (Spain) Lara Arruabarrena	(Colombia) Camila Osorio (Spain) Sara Sorribes Tormo (Slovenia) Tamara Zidanšek (Italy) Sara Errani
15 Apr	Fed Cup Semifinals; Rouen, France – clay (red) (i); Brisbane, Australia – hard	Semifinals winners: France 3–2 Australia 3–2	Semifinals losers: Romania Belarus		
22 Apr	Stuttgart Open; Stuttgart, Germany; WTA Premier; Clay (red) (i) – $886,077 – 28S/32Q/16D; Singles – Doubles	(Czech Republic) Petra Kvitová; 6–3, 7–6^{(7–2)}	(Estonia) Anett Kontaveit	(Japan) Naomi Osaka (Netherlands) Kiki Bertens	(Croatia) Donna Vekić (Belarus) Victoria Azarenka (Latvia) Anastasija Sevastova (Germany) Angelique Kerber
22 Apr	Stuttgart Open; Stuttgart, Germany; WTA Premier; Clay (red) (i) – $886,077 – 28S/32Q/16D; Singles – Doubles	(Germany) Mona Barthel (Germany) Anna-Lena Friedsam; 2–6, 6–3, [10–6]	(Russia) Anastasia Pavlyuchenkova (Czech Republic) Lucie Šafářová	(Japan) Naomi Osaka (Netherlands) Kiki Bertens	(Croatia) Donna Vekić (Belarus) Victoria Azarenka (Latvia) Anastasija Sevastova (Germany) Angelique Kerber
22 Apr	İstanbul Cup; Istanbul, Turkey; WTA International; Clay – $250,000 (red) – 32S/24Q/16D; Singles – Doubles	(Croatia) Petra Martić; 1–6, 6–4, 6–1	(Czech Republic) Markéta Vondroušová	(Czech Republic) Barbora Strýcová (Russia) Margarita Gasparyan	(Spain) Lara Arruabarrena (Kazakhstan) Elena Rybakina (France) Kristina Mladenovic (Russia) Veronika Kudermetova
22 Apr	İstanbul Cup; Istanbul, Turkey; WTA International; Clay – $250,000 (red) – 32S/24Q/16D; Singles – Doubles	(Hungary) Tímea Babos (France) Kristina Mladenovic; 6–1, 6–0	(Chile) Alexa Guarachi (United States) Sabrina Santamaria	(Czech Republic) Barbora Strýcová (Russia) Margarita Gasparyan	(Spain) Lara Arruabarrena (Kazakhstan) Elena Rybakina (France) Kristina Mladenovic (Russia) Veronika Kudermetova
29 Apr	Prague Open; Prague, Czech Republic; WTA International; Clay – $250,000 (red) – 32S/32Q/16D; Singles – Doubles	(Switzerland) Jil Teichmann; 7–6^{(7–5)}, 3–6, 6–4	(Czech Republic) Karolína Muchová	(Czech Republic) Barbora Strýcová (United States) Bernarda Pera	(Czech Republic) Kateřina Siniaková (Germany) Tamara Korpatsch (China) Wang Qiang (Russia) Natalia Vikhlyantseva
29 Apr	Prague Open; Prague, Czech Republic; WTA International; Clay – $250,000 (red) – 32S/32Q/16D; Singles – Doubles	(Russia) Anna Kalinskaya (Slovakia) Viktória Kužmová; 4–6, 7–5, [10–7]	(United States) Nicole Melichar (Czech Republic) Květa Peschke	(Czech Republic) Barbora Strýcová (United States) Bernarda Pera	(Czech Republic) Kateřina Siniaková (Germany) Tamara Korpatsch (China) Wang Qiang (Russia) Natalia Vikhlyantseva
29 Apr	Morocco Open; Rabat, Morocco; WTA International; Clay – $250,000 (red) – 32S/32Q/16D; Singles – Doubles	(Greece) Maria Sakkari; 2–6, 6–4, 6–1	(United Kingdom) Johanna Konta	(Belgium) Alison Van Uytvanck (Australia) Ajla Tomljanović	(Belgium) Elise Mertens (Belgium) Ysaline Bonaventure (Sweden) Rebecca Peterson (Chinese Taipei) Hsieh Su-wei
29 Apr	Morocco Open; Rabat, Morocco; WTA International; Clay – $250,000 (red) – 32S/32Q/16D; Singles – Doubles	(Spain) María José Martínez Sánchez (Spain) Sara Sorribes Tormo; 7–5, 6–1	(Spain) Georgina García Pérez (Georgia (country)) Oksana Kalashnikova	(Belgium) Alison Van Uytvanck (Australia) Ajla Tomljanović	(Belgium) Elise Mertens (Belgium) Ysaline Bonaventure (Sweden) Rebecca Peterson (Chinese Taipei) Hsieh Su-wei

=== May ===
Week	Tournament	Champions	Runners-up	Semifinalists	Quarterfinalists
6 May	Madrid Open; Madrid, Spain; WTA Premier Mandatory; Clay (red) – $7,021,128 – 64S/32Q/28D; Singles – Doubles	(Netherlands) Kiki Bertens; 6–4, 6–4	(Romania) Simona Halep	(Switzerland) Belinda Bencic (United States) Sloane Stephens	(Japan) Naomi Osaka (Australia) Ashleigh Barty (Croatia) Petra Martić (Czech Republic) Petra Kvitová
6 May	Madrid Open; Madrid, Spain; WTA Premier Mandatory; Clay (red) – $7,021,128 – 64S/32Q/28D; Singles – Doubles	(Chinese Taipei) Hsieh Su-wei (Czech Republic) Barbora Strýcová; 6–3, 6–1	(Canada) Gabriela Dabrowski (China) Xu Yifan	(Switzerland) Belinda Bencic (United States) Sloane Stephens	(Japan) Naomi Osaka (Australia) Ashleigh Barty (Croatia) Petra Martić (Czech Republic) Petra Kvitová
13 May	Italian Open; Rome, Italy; WTA Premier 5 Clay (red) – $3,452,538 – 56S/32Q/28D; Singles – Doubles	(Czech Republic) Karolína Plíšková; 6–3, 6–4	(United Kingdom) Johanna Konta	(Netherlands) Kiki Bertens (Greece) Maria Sakkari	(Japan) Naomi Osaka (Czech Republic) Markéta Vondroušová (Belarus) Victoria Azarenka (France) Kristina Mladenovic
13 May	Italian Open; Rome, Italy; WTA Premier 5 Clay (red) – $3,452,538 – 56S/32Q/28D; Singles – Doubles	(Belarus) Victoria Azarenka (Australia) Ashleigh Barty; 4–6, 6–0, [10–3]	(Germany) Anna-Lena Grönefeld (Netherlands) Demi Schuurs	(Netherlands) Kiki Bertens (Greece) Maria Sakkari	(Japan) Naomi Osaka (Czech Republic) Markéta Vondroušová (Belarus) Victoria Azarenka (France) Kristina Mladenovic
20 May	Internationaux de Strasbourg; Strasbourg, France; WTA International; Clay – $250,000 (red) – 32S/24Q/16D; Singles – Doubles	(Ukraine) Dayana Yastremska; 6–4, 5–7, 7–6^{(7–3)}	(France) Caroline Garcia	(France) Chloé Paquet (Belarus) Aryna Sabalenka	(Australia) Daria Gavrilova (Ukraine) Marta Kostyuk (France) Fiona Ferro (Puerto Rico) Monica Puig
20 May	Internationaux de Strasbourg; Strasbourg, France; WTA International; Clay – $250,000 (red) – 32S/24Q/16D; Singles – Doubles	(Australia) Daria Gavrilova (Australia) Ellen Perez; 6–4, 6–3	(China) Duan Yingying (China) Han Xinyun	(France) Chloé Paquet (Belarus) Aryna Sabalenka	(Australia) Daria Gavrilova (Ukraine) Marta Kostyuk (France) Fiona Ferro (Puerto Rico) Monica Puig
20 May	Nuremberg Cup; Nürnberg, Germany; WTA International; Clay – $250,000 (red) – 32S/24Q/16D; Singles – Doubles	(Kazakhstan) Yulia Putintseva; 4–6, 6–4, 6–2	(Slovenia) Tamara Zidanšek	(Romania) Sorana Cîrstea (Czech Republic) Kateřina Siniaková	(Germany) Anna-Lena Friedsam (Serbia) Nina Stojanović (Russia) Veronika Kudermetova (United States) Madison Brengle
20 May	Nuremberg Cup; Nürnberg, Germany; WTA International; Clay – $250,000 (red) – 32S/24Q/16D; Singles – Doubles	(Canada) Gabriela Dabrowski (China) Xu Yifan; 4–6, 7–6^{(7–5)}, [10–5]	(Canada) Sharon Fichman (United States) Nicole Melichar	(Romania) Sorana Cîrstea (Czech Republic) Kateřina Siniaková	(Germany) Anna-Lena Friedsam (Serbia) Nina Stojanović (Russia) Veronika Kudermetova (United States) Madison Brengle
27 May; 3 Jun	French Open; Paris, France; Grand Slam; Clay (red) – €19,991,500; 128S/96Q/64D/32X; Singles – Doubles – Mixed doubles	(Australia) Ashleigh Barty; 6–1, 6–3	(Czech Republic) Markéta Vondroušová	(United States) Amanda Anisimova (United Kingdom) Johanna Konta	(United States) Madison Keys (Romania) Simona Halep (United States) Sloane Stephens (Croatia) Petra Martić
27 May; 3 Jun	French Open; Paris, France; Grand Slam; Clay (red) – €19,991,500; 128S/96Q/64D/32X; Singles – Doubles – Mixed doubles	(Hungary) Tímea Babos (France) Kristina Mladenovic; 6–2, 6–3	(China) Duan Yingying (China) Zheng Saisai	(United States) Amanda Anisimova (United Kingdom) Johanna Konta	(United States) Madison Keys (Romania) Simona Halep (United States) Sloane Stephens (Croatia) Petra Martić
27 May; 3 Jun	French Open; Paris, France; Grand Slam; Clay (red) – €19,991,500; 128S/96Q/64D/32X; Singles – Doubles – Mixed doubles	(Chinese Taipei) Latisha Chan (Croatia) Ivan Dodig; 6–1, 7–6^{(7–5)}	(Canada) Gabriela Dabrowski (Croatia) Mate Pavić	(United States) Amanda Anisimova (United Kingdom) Johanna Konta	(United States) Madison Keys (Romania) Simona Halep (United States) Sloane Stephens (Croatia) Petra Martić

=== June ===
Week	Tournament	Champions	Runners-up	Semifinalists	Quarterfinalists
10 Jun	Nottingham Open; Nottingham, United Kingdom; WTA International; Grass – $250,000 – 32S/24Q/16D; Singles – Doubles	(France) Caroline Garcia; 2–6, 7–6^{(7–4)}, 7–6^{(7–4)}	(Croatia) Donna Vekić	(United States) Jennifer Brady (Germany) Tatjana Maria	(Romania) Elena-Gabriela Ruse (Greece) Maria Sakkari (Australia) Ajla Tomljanović (France) Kristina Mladenovic
10 Jun	Nottingham Open; Nottingham, United Kingdom; WTA International; Grass – $250,000 – 32S/24Q/16D; Singles – Doubles	(United States) Desirae Krawczyk (Mexico) Giuliana Olmos; 7–6^{(7–5)}, 7–5	(Australia) Ellen Perez (Australia) Arina Rodionova	(United States) Jennifer Brady (Germany) Tatjana Maria	(Romania) Elena-Gabriela Ruse (Greece) Maria Sakkari (Australia) Ajla Tomljanović (France) Kristina Mladenovic
10 Jun	Rosmalen Grass Court Championships; Rosmalen, Netherlands; WTA International; Grass – $250,000 – 32S/24Q/16D; Singles – Doubles	(United States) Alison Riske; 0–6, 7–6^{(7–3)}, 7–5	(Netherlands) Kiki Bertens	(Kazakhstan) Elena Rybakina (Russia) Veronika Kudermetova	(Russia) Natalia Vikhlyantseva (Belgium) Kirsten Flipkens (Russia) Ekaterina Alexandrova (Belgium) Greet Minnen
10 Jun	Rosmalen Grass Court Championships; Rosmalen, Netherlands; WTA International; Grass – $250,000 – 32S/24Q/16D; Singles – Doubles	(Japan) Shuko Aoyama (Serbia) Aleksandra Krunić; 7–5, 6–3	(Netherlands) Lesley Kerkhove (Netherlands) Bibiane Schoofs	(Kazakhstan) Elena Rybakina (Russia) Veronika Kudermetova	(Russia) Natalia Vikhlyantseva (Belgium) Kirsten Flipkens (Russia) Ekaterina Alexandrova (Belgium) Greet Minnen
17 Jun	Birmingham Classic; Birmingham, United Kingdom; WTA Premier; Grass – $1,006,263 – 32S/32Q/16D; Singles – Doubles	(Australia) Ashleigh Barty; 6–3, 7–5	(Germany) Julia Görges	(Croatia) Petra Martić (Czech Republic) Barbora Strýcová	(Kazakhstan) Yulia Putintseva (Latvia) Jeļena Ostapenko (Czech Republic) Kristýna Plíšková (United States) Venus Williams
17 Jun	Birmingham Classic; Birmingham, United Kingdom; WTA Premier; Grass – $1,006,263 – 32S/32Q/16D; Singles – Doubles	(Chinese Taipei) Hsieh Su-wei (Czech Republic) Barbora Strýcová; 6–4, 6–7^{(4–7)}, [10–8]	(Germany) Anna-Lena Grönefeld (Netherlands) Demi Schuurs	(Croatia) Petra Martić (Czech Republic) Barbora Strýcová	(Kazakhstan) Yulia Putintseva (Latvia) Jeļena Ostapenko (Czech Republic) Kristýna Plíšková (United States) Venus Williams
17 Jun	Mallorca Open; Santa Ponsa, Spain; WTA International; Grass – $250,000 – 32S/24Q/16D; Singles – Doubles	(United States) Sofia Kenin; 6–7^{(2–7)}, 7–6^{(7–5)}, 6–4	(Switzerland) Belinda Bencic	(Germany) Angelique Kerber (Latvia) Anastasija Sevastova	(France) Caroline Garcia (United States) Amanda Anisimova (Belgium) Elise Mertens (China) Wang Yafan
17 Jun	Mallorca Open; Santa Ponsa, Spain; WTA International; Grass – $250,000 – 32S/24Q/16D; Singles – Doubles	(Belgium) Kirsten Flipkens (Sweden) Johanna Larsson; 6–2, 6–4	(Spain) María José Martínez Sánchez (Spain) Sara Sorribes Tormo	(Germany) Angelique Kerber (Latvia) Anastasija Sevastova	(France) Caroline Garcia (United States) Amanda Anisimova (Belgium) Elise Mertens (China) Wang Yafan
24 Jun	Eastbourne International; Eastbourne, United Kingdom; WTA Premier; Grass – $998,712 – 56S/24Q/16D; Singles – Doubles	(Czech Republic) Karolína Plíšková; 6–1, 6–4	(Germany) Angelique Kerber	(Tunisia) Ons Jabeur (Netherlands) Kiki Bertens	(France) Alizé Cornet (Romania) Simona Halep (Belarus) Aryna Sabalenka (Russia) Ekaterina Alexandrova
24 Jun	Eastbourne International; Eastbourne, United Kingdom; WTA Premier; Grass – $998,712 – 56S/24Q/16D; Singles – Doubles	(Chinese Taipei) Chan Hao-ching (Chinese Taipei) Latisha Chan; 2–6, 6–3, [10–6]	(Belgium) Kirsten Flipkens (United States) Bethanie Mattek-Sands	(Tunisia) Ons Jabeur (Netherlands) Kiki Bertens	(France) Alizé Cornet (Romania) Simona Halep (Belarus) Aryna Sabalenka (Russia) Ekaterina Alexandrova

=== July ===
Week	Tournament	Champions	Runners-up	Semifinalists	Quarterfinalists
1 Jul; 8 Jul	Wimbledon; London, United Kingdom; Grand Slam; Grass – £17,984,000; 128S/128Q/64D/48X; Singles – Doubles – Mixed doubles	(Romania) Simona Halep; 6–2, 6–2	(United States) Serena Williams	(Czech Republic) Barbora Strýcová (Ukraine) Elina Svitolina	(United States) Alison Riske (United Kingdom) Johanna Konta (Czech Republic) Karolína Muchová (China) Zhang Shuai
1 Jul; 8 Jul	Wimbledon; London, United Kingdom; Grand Slam; Grass – £17,984,000; 128S/128Q/64D/48X; Singles – Doubles – Mixed doubles	(Chinese Taipei) Hsieh Su-wei (Czech Republic) Barbora Strýcová; 6–2, 6–4	(Canada) Gabriela Dabrowski (China) Xu Yifan	(Czech Republic) Barbora Strýcová (Ukraine) Elina Svitolina	(United States) Alison Riske (United Kingdom) Johanna Konta (Czech Republic) Karolína Muchová (China) Zhang Shuai
1 Jul; 8 Jul	Wimbledon; London, United Kingdom; Grand Slam; Grass – £17,984,000; 128S/128Q/64D/48X; Singles – Doubles – Mixed doubles	(Croatia) Ivan Dodig (Chinese Taipei) Latisha Chan; 6–2, 6–3	(Sweden) Robert Lindstedt (Latvia) Jeļena Ostapenko	(Czech Republic) Barbora Strýcová (Ukraine) Elina Svitolina	(United States) Alison Riske (United Kingdom) Johanna Konta (Czech Republic) Karolína Muchová (China) Zhang Shuai
15 Jul	Bucharest Open; Bucharest, Romania; WTA International; Clay – $250,000 (red) – 32S/32Q/16D; Singles – Doubles	(Kazakhstan) Elena Rybakina; 6–2, 6–0	(Romania) Patricia Maria Țig	(Germany) Laura Siegemund (Italy) Martina Di Giuseppe	(Czech Republic) Kristýna Plíšková (Romania) Irina-Camelia Begu (Czech Republic) Barbora Krejčíková (Slovakia) Viktória Kužmová
15 Jul	Bucharest Open; Bucharest, Romania; WTA International; Clay – $250,000 (red) – 32S/32Q/16D; Singles – Doubles	(Slovakia) Viktória Kužmová (Czech Republic) Kristýna Plíšková; 6–4, 7–6^{(7–3)}	(Romania) Jaqueline Cristian (Romania) Elena-Gabriela Ruse	(Germany) Laura Siegemund (Italy) Martina Di Giuseppe	(Czech Republic) Kristýna Plíšková (Romania) Irina-Camelia Begu (Czech Republic) Barbora Krejčíková (Slovakia) Viktória Kužmová
15 Jul	Swiss Open; Lausanne, Switzerland; WTA International; Clay – $250,000 (red) – 32S/24Q/16D; Singles – Doubles	(France) Fiona Ferro; 6–1, 2–6, 6–1	(France) Alizé Cornet	(Germany) Tamara Korpatsch (United States) Bernarda Pera	(Switzerland) Jil Teichmann (Russia) Natalia Vikhlyantseva (Australia) Samantha Stosur (China) Han Xinyun
15 Jul	Swiss Open; Lausanne, Switzerland; WTA International; Clay – $250,000 (red) – 32S/24Q/16D; Singles – Doubles	(Russia) Anastasia Potapova (Russia) Yana Sizikova; 6–2, 6–4	(Australia) Monique Adamczak (China) Han Xinyun	(Germany) Tamara Korpatsch (United States) Bernarda Pera	(Switzerland) Jil Teichmann (Russia) Natalia Vikhlyantseva (Australia) Samantha Stosur (China) Han Xinyun
22 Jul	Baltic Open; Jūrmala, Latvia; WTA International; Clay – $250,000 (red) – 32S/24Q/16D; Singles – Doubles	(Latvia) Anastasija Sevastova; 3–6, 7–5, 6–4	(Poland) Katarzyna Kawa	(Russia) Anastasia Potapova (United States) Bernarda Pera	(Romania) Irina Bara (Romania) Patricia Maria Țig (Serbia) Nina Stojanović (France) Chloé Paquet
22 Jul	Baltic Open; Jūrmala, Latvia; WTA International; Clay – $250,000 (red) – 32S/24Q/16D; Singles – Doubles	(Canada) Sharon Fichman (Serbia) Nina Stojanović; 2–6, 7–6^{(7–1)}, [10–6]	(Latvia) Jeļena Ostapenko (Kazakhstan) Galina Voskoboeva	(Russia) Anastasia Potapova (United States) Bernarda Pera	(Romania) Irina Bara (Romania) Patricia Maria Țig (Serbia) Nina Stojanović (France) Chloé Paquet
22 Jul	Palermo International; Palermo, Italy; WTA International; Clay – $250,000 (red) – 32S/24Q/16D; Singles – Doubles	(Switzerland) Jil Teichmann; 7–6^{(7–3)}, 6–2	(Netherlands) Kiki Bertens	(Spain) Paula Badosa (Russia) Liudmila Samsonova	(Italy) Jasmine Paolini (Netherlands) Arantxa Rus (France) Fiona Ferro (Germany) Anna-Lena Friedsam
22 Jul	Palermo International; Palermo, Italy; WTA International; Clay – $250,000 (red) – 32S/24Q/16D; Singles – Doubles	(Sweden) Cornelia Lister (Czech Republic) Renata Voráčová; 7–6^{(7–2)}, 6–2	(Georgia (country)) Ekaterine Gorgodze (Netherlands) Arantxa Rus	(Spain) Paula Badosa (Russia) Liudmila Samsonova	(Italy) Jasmine Paolini (Netherlands) Arantxa Rus (France) Fiona Ferro (Germany) Anna-Lena Friedsam
29 Jul	Silicon Valley Classic; San Jose, United States; WTA Premier; Hard – $876,183 – 28S/16Q/16D; Singles – Doubles	(China) Zheng Saisai; 6−3, 7−6^{(7−3)}	(Belarus) Aryna Sabalenka	(Greece) Maria Sakkari (Croatia) Donna Vekić	(Ukraine) Elina Svitolina (United States) Amanda Anisimova (United States) Kristie Ahn (Spain) Carla Suárez Navarro
29 Jul	Silicon Valley Classic; San Jose, United States; WTA Premier; Hard – $876,183 – 28S/16Q/16D; Singles – Doubles	(United States) Nicole Melichar (Czech Republic) Květa Peschke; 6−4, 6−4	(Japan) Shuko Aoyama (Japan) Ena Shibahara	(Greece) Maria Sakkari (Croatia) Donna Vekić	(Ukraine) Elina Svitolina (United States) Amanda Anisimova (United States) Kristie Ahn (Spain) Carla Suárez Navarro
29 Jul	Washington Open; Washington, D.C., United States; WTA International; Hard – $250,000 – 32S/16Q/16D; Singles – Doubles	(United States) Jessica Pegula; 6–2, 6–2	(Italy) Camila Giorgi	(United States) Caty McNally (Russia) Anna Kalinskaya	(Kazakhstan) Zarina Diyas (Chinese Taipei) Hsieh Su-wei (United States) Lauren Davis (France) Kristina Mladenovic
29 Jul	Washington Open; Washington, D.C., United States; WTA International; Hard – $250,000 – 32S/16Q/16D; Singles – Doubles	(United States) Coco Gauff (United States) Caty McNally; 6–2, 6–2	(United States) Maria Sanchez (Hungary) Fanny Stollár	(United States) Caty McNally (Russia) Anna Kalinskaya	(Kazakhstan) Zarina Diyas (Chinese Taipei) Hsieh Su-wei (United States) Lauren Davis (France) Kristina Mladenovic

=== August ===
Week	Tournament	Champions	Runners-up	Semifinalists	Quarterfinalists
5 Aug	Canadian Open; Toronto, Canada; WTA Premier 5 Hard – $2,830,000 – 56S/48Q/28D; Singles – Doubles	(Canada) Bianca Andreescu; 3–1 ret.	(United States) Serena Williams	(United States) Sofia Kenin (Czech Republic) Marie Bouzková	(Ukraine) Elina Svitolina (Czech Republic) Karolína Plíšková (Romania) Simona Halep (Japan) Naomi Osaka
5 Aug	Canadian Open; Toronto, Canada; WTA Premier 5 Hard – $2,830,000 – 56S/48Q/28D; Singles – Doubles	(Czech Republic) Barbora Krejčíková (Czech Republic) Kateřina Siniaková; 7–5, 6–0	(Germany) Anna-Lena Grönefeld (Netherlands) Demi Schuurs	(United States) Sofia Kenin (Czech Republic) Marie Bouzková	(Ukraine) Elina Svitolina (Czech Republic) Karolína Plíšková (Romania) Simona Halep (Japan) Naomi Osaka
12 Aug	Cincinnati Open; Mason, United States; WTA Premier 5 Hard – $2,944,486 – 56S/48Q/28D; Singles – Doubles	(United States) Madison Keys; 7–5, 7–6^{(7–5)}	(Russia) Svetlana Kuznetsova	(Australia) Ashleigh Barty (United States) Sofia Kenin	(Greece) Maria Sakkari (Czech Republic) Karolína Plíšková (United States) Venus Williams (Japan) Naomi Osaka
12 Aug	Cincinnati Open; Mason, United States; WTA Premier 5 Hard – $2,944,486 – 56S/48Q/28D; Singles – Doubles	(Czech Republic) Lucie Hradecká (Slovenia) Andreja Klepač; 6–4, 6–1	(Germany) Anna-Lena Grönefeld (Netherlands) Demi Schuurs	(Australia) Ashleigh Barty (United States) Sofia Kenin	(Greece) Maria Sakkari (Czech Republic) Karolína Plíšková (United States) Venus Williams (Japan) Naomi Osaka
19 Aug	Bronx Open; New York City, United States; WTA International; Hard – $250,000 – 30S/48Q/16D; Singles – Doubles	(Poland) Magda Linette; 5–7, 7–5, 6–4	(Italy) Camila Giorgi	(China) Wang Qiang (Czech Republic) Kateřina Siniaková	(Russia) Anna Blinkova (France) Alizé Cornet (Czech Republic) Karolína Muchová (United States) Bernarda Pera
19 Aug	Bronx Open; New York City, United States; WTA International; Hard – $250,000 – 30S/48Q/16D; Singles – Doubles	(Croatia) Darija Jurak (Spain) María José Martínez Sánchez; 7–5, 2–6, [10–7]	(Russia) Margarita Gasparyan (Romania) Monica Niculescu	(China) Wang Qiang (Czech Republic) Kateřina Siniaková	(Russia) Anna Blinkova (France) Alizé Cornet (Czech Republic) Karolína Muchová (United States) Bernarda Pera
26 Aug; 2 Sep	US Open; New York City, United States; Grand Slam; Hard – $26,758,750; 128S/128Q/64D/32X; Singles – Doubles – Mixed doubles	(Canada) Bianca Andreescu; 6–3, 7–5	(United States) Serena Williams	(Switzerland) Belinda Bencic (Ukraine) Elina Svitolina	(Croatia) Donna Vekić (Belgium) Elise Mertens (United Kingdom) Johanna Konta (China) Wang Qiang
26 Aug; 2 Sep	US Open; New York City, United States; Grand Slam; Hard – $26,758,750; 128S/128Q/64D/32X; Singles – Doubles – Mixed doubles	(Belgium) Elise Mertens (Belarus) Aryna Sabalenka; 7–5, 7–5	(Belarus) Victoria Azarenka (Australia) Ashleigh Barty	(Switzerland) Belinda Bencic (Ukraine) Elina Svitolina	(Croatia) Donna Vekić (Belgium) Elise Mertens (United Kingdom) Johanna Konta (China) Wang Qiang
26 Aug; 2 Sep	US Open; New York City, United States; Grand Slam; Hard – $26,758,750; 128S/128Q/64D/32X; Singles – Doubles – Mixed doubles	(United States) Bethanie Mattek-Sands (United Kingdom) Jamie Murray; 6–2, 6–3	(Chinese Taipei) Chan Hao-ching (New Zealand) Michael Venus	(Switzerland) Belinda Bencic (Ukraine) Elina Svitolina	(Croatia) Donna Vekić (Belgium) Elise Mertens (United Kingdom) Johanna Konta (China) Wang Qiang

=== September ===
Week	Tournament	Champions	Runners-up	Semifinalists	Quarterfinalists
9 Sep	Zhengzhou Open; Zhengzhou, China; WTA Premier; Hard – $1,000,000 – 28S/32Q/16D; Singles – Doubles	(Czech Republic) Karolína Plíšková; 6–3, 6–2	(Croatia) Petra Martić	(Australia) Ajla Tomljanović (France) Kristina Mladenovic	(United States) Sofia Kenin (China) Zheng Saisai (Belarus) Aryna Sabalenka (Ukraine) Elina Svitolina
9 Sep	Zhengzhou Open; Zhengzhou, China; WTA Premier; Hard – $1,000,000 – 28S/32Q/16D; Singles – Doubles	(United States) Nicole Melichar (Czech Republic) Květa Peschke; 6–1, 7–6^{(7–2)}	(Belgium) Yanina Wickmayer (Slovenia) Tamara Zidanšek	(Australia) Ajla Tomljanović (France) Kristina Mladenovic	(United States) Sofia Kenin (China) Zheng Saisai (Belarus) Aryna Sabalenka (Ukraine) Elina Svitolina
9 Sep	Japan Women's Open; Hiroshima, Japan; WTA International; Hard – $250,000 – 32S/32Q/16D; Singles – Doubles	(Japan) Nao Hibino; 6–3, 6–2	(Japan) Misaki Doi	(Romania) Mihaela Buzărnescu (Russia) Veronika Kudermetova	(Chinese Taipei) Hsieh Su-wei (Belgium) Alison Van Uytvanck (Spain) Sara Sorribes Tormo (Germany) Laura Siegemund
9 Sep	Japan Women's Open; Hiroshima, Japan; WTA International; Hard – $250,000 – 32S/32Q/16D; Singles – Doubles	(Japan) Misaki Doi (Japan) Nao Hibino; 3–6, 6–4, [10–4]	(United States) Christina McHale (Russia) Valeria Savinykh	(Romania) Mihaela Buzărnescu (Russia) Veronika Kudermetova	(Chinese Taipei) Hsieh Su-wei (Belgium) Alison Van Uytvanck (Spain) Sara Sorribes Tormo (Germany) Laura Siegemund
9 Sep	Jiangxi Open; Nanchang, China; WTA International; Hard – $250,000 – 32S/24Q/16D; Singles – Doubles	(Sweden) Rebecca Peterson; 6–2, 6–0	(Kazakhstan) Elena Rybakina	(China) Peng Shuai (Serbia) Nina Stojanović	(China) Zhu Lin (Switzerland) Viktorija Golubic (Poland) Magda Linette (Ukraine) Kateryna Kozlova
9 Sep	Jiangxi Open; Nanchang, China; WTA International; Hard – $250,000 – 32S/24Q/16D; Singles – Doubles	(China) Wang Xinyu (China) Zhu Lin; 6–2, 7–6^{(7–5)}	(China) Peng Shuai (China) Zhang Shuai	(China) Peng Shuai (Serbia) Nina Stojanović	(China) Zhu Lin (Switzerland) Viktorija Golubic (Poland) Magda Linette (Ukraine) Kateryna Kozlova
16 Sep	Pan Pacific Open; Osaka, Japan; WTA Premier; Hard – $823,000 – 28S/24Q/16D; Singles – Doubles	(Japan) Naomi Osaka; 6–2, 6–3	(Russia) Anastasia Pavlyuchenkova	(Belgium) Elise Mertens (Germany) Angelique Kerber	(Kazakhstan) Yulia Putintseva (Italy) Camila Giorgi (United States) Madison Keys (Japan) Misaki Doi
16 Sep	Pan Pacific Open; Osaka, Japan; WTA Premier; Hard – $823,000 – 28S/24Q/16D; Singles – Doubles	(Chinese Taipei) Chan Hao-ching (Chinese Taipei) Latisha Chan; 7–5, 7–5	(Chinese Taipei) Hsieh Su-wei (Chinese Taipei) Hsieh Yu-chieh	(Belgium) Elise Mertens (Germany) Angelique Kerber	(Kazakhstan) Yulia Putintseva (Italy) Camila Giorgi (United States) Madison Keys (Japan) Misaki Doi
16 Sep	Guangzhou Open; Guangzhou, China; WTA International; Hard – $500,000 – 32S/24Q/16D; Singles – Doubles	(United States) Sofia Kenin; 6–7^{(4–7)}, 6–4, 6–2	(Australia) Samantha Stosur	(Russia) Anna Blinkova (Switzerland) Viktorija Golubic	(Czech Republic) Marie Bouzková (Italy) Jasmine Paolini (China) Zhang Shuai (Serbia) Nina Stojanović
16 Sep	Guangzhou Open; Guangzhou, China; WTA International; Hard – $500,000 – 32S/24Q/16D; Singles – Doubles	(China) Peng Shuai (Germany) Laura Siegemund; 6–2, 6–1	(Chile) Alexa Guarachi (Mexico) Giuliana Olmos	(Russia) Anna Blinkova (Switzerland) Viktorija Golubic	(Czech Republic) Marie Bouzková (Italy) Jasmine Paolini (China) Zhang Shuai (Serbia) Nina Stojanović
16 Sep	Korea Open; Seoul, South Korea; WTA International; Hard – $250,000 – 32S/24Q/16D; Singles – Doubles	(Czech Republic) Karolína Muchová; 6–1, 6–1	(Poland) Magda Linette	(China) Wang Yafan (Russia) Ekaterina Alexandrova	(Spain) Paula Badosa (Australia) Priscilla Hon (Belgium) Kirsten Flipkens (United States) Kristie Ahn
16 Sep	Korea Open; Seoul, South Korea; WTA International; Hard – $250,000 – 32S/24Q/16D; Singles – Doubles	(Spain) Lara Arruabarrena (Germany) Tatjana Maria; 7–6^{(9–7)}, 3–6, [10–7]	(United States) Hayley Carter (Brazil) Luisa Stefani	(China) Wang Yafan (Russia) Ekaterina Alexandrova	(Spain) Paula Badosa (Australia) Priscilla Hon (Belgium) Kirsten Flipkens (United States) Kristie Ahn
23 Sep	Wuhan Open; Wuhan, China; WTA Premier 5 Hard – $2,828,000 – 56S/32Q/28D; Singles – Doubles	(Belarus) Aryna Sabalenka; 6–3, 3–6, 6–1	(United States) Alison Riske	(Australia) Ashleigh Barty (Czech Republic) Petra Kvitová	(Croatia) Petra Martić (Kazakhstan) Elena Rybakina (Ukraine) Elina Svitolina (Ukraine) Dayana Yastremska
23 Sep	Wuhan Open; Wuhan, China; WTA Premier 5 Hard – $2,828,000 – 56S/32Q/28D; Singles – Doubles	(China) Duan Yingying (Russia) Veronika Kudermetova; 7–6^{(7–3)}, 6–2	(Belgium) Elise Mertens (Belarus) Aryna Sabalenka	(Australia) Ashleigh Barty (Czech Republic) Petra Kvitová	(Croatia) Petra Martić (Kazakhstan) Elena Rybakina (Ukraine) Elina Svitolina (Ukraine) Dayana Yastremska
23 Sep	Tashkent Open; Tashkent, Uzbekistan; WTA International; Hard – $250,000 – 32S/16Q/16D; Singles – Doubles	(Belgium) Alison Van Uytvanck; 6–2, 4–6, 6–4	(Romania) Sorana Cîrstea	(Czech Republic) Kristýna Plíšková (Ukraine) Katarina Zavatska	(Slovakia) Viktória Kužmová (France) Pauline Parmentier (Russia) Anna Kalinskaya (Montenegro) Danka Kovinić
23 Sep	Tashkent Open; Tashkent, Uzbekistan; WTA International; Hard – $250,000 – 32S/16Q/16D; Singles – Doubles	(United States) Hayley Carter (Brazil) Luisa Stefani; 6–3, 7–6^{(7–4)}	(Slovenia) Dalila Jakupović (United States) Sabrina Santamaria	(Czech Republic) Kristýna Plíšková (Ukraine) Katarina Zavatska	(Slovakia) Viktória Kužmová (France) Pauline Parmentier (Russia) Anna Kalinskaya (Montenegro) Danka Kovinić
30 Sep	China Open; Beijing, China; WTA Premier Mandatory; Hard – $8,285,274 – 60S/32Q/28D; Singles – Doubles	(Japan) Naomi Osaka; 3–6, 6–3, 6–2	(Australia) Ashleigh Barty	(Netherlands) Kiki Bertens (Denmark) Caroline Wozniacki	(Czech Republic) Petra Kvitová (Ukraine) Elina Svitolina (Canada) Bianca Andreescu (Russia) Daria Kasatkina
30 Sep	China Open; Beijing, China; WTA Premier Mandatory; Hard – $8,285,274 – 60S/32Q/28D; Singles – Doubles	(United States) Sofia Kenin (United States) Bethanie Mattek-Sands; 6–3, 6–7^{(5–7)}, [10–7]	(Latvia) Jeļena Ostapenko (Ukraine) Dayana Yastremska	(Netherlands) Kiki Bertens (Denmark) Caroline Wozniacki	(Czech Republic) Petra Kvitová (Ukraine) Elina Svitolina (Canada) Bianca Andreescu (Russia) Daria Kasatkina

=== October ===
Week	Tournament	Champions	Runners-up	Semifinalists	Quarterfinalists
7 Oct	Tianjin Open; Tianjin, China; WTA International; Hard – $500,000 – 32S/32Q/16D; Singles – Doubles	(Sweden) Rebecca Peterson; 6–4, 6–4	(United Kingdom) Heather Watson	(Tunisia) Ons Jabeur (Russia) Veronika Kudermetova	(Kazakhstan) Yulia Putintseva (China) Wang Yafan (Ukraine) Dayana Yastremska (Poland) Magda Linette
7 Oct	Tianjin Open; Tianjin, China; WTA International; Hard – $500,000 – 32S/32Q/16D; Singles – Doubles	(Japan) Shuko Aoyama (Japan) Ena Shibahara; 6–3, 7–5	(Japan) Nao Hibino (Japan) Miyu Kato	(Tunisia) Ons Jabeur (Russia) Veronika Kudermetova	(Kazakhstan) Yulia Putintseva (China) Wang Yafan (Ukraine) Dayana Yastremska (Poland) Magda Linette
7 Oct	Linz Open; Linz, Austria; WTA International; Hard (i) – $250,000 – 32S/24Q/16D; Singles – Doubles	(United States) Coco Gauff; 6–3, 1–6, 6–2	(Latvia) Jeļena Ostapenko	(Germany) Andrea Petkovic (Russia) Ekaterina Alexandrova	(Netherlands) Kiki Bertens (Slovakia) Viktória Kužmová (France) Kristina Mladenovic (Kazakhstan) Elena Rybakina
7 Oct	Linz Open; Linz, Austria; WTA International; Hard (i) – $250,000 – 32S/24Q/16D; Singles – Doubles	(Czech Republic) Barbora Krejčíková (Czech Republic) Kateřina Siniaková; 6–4, 6–3	(Austria) Barbara Haas (Switzerland) Xenia Knoll	(Germany) Andrea Petkovic (Russia) Ekaterina Alexandrova	(Netherlands) Kiki Bertens (Slovakia) Viktória Kužmová (France) Kristina Mladenovic (Kazakhstan) Elena Rybakina
14 Oct	Kremlin Cup; Moscow, Russia; WTA Premier; Hard (i) – $1,032,000 – 28S/32Q/16D; Singles – Doubles	(Switzerland) Belinda Bencic; 3–6, 6–1, 6–1	(Russia) Anastasia Pavlyuchenkova	(Czech Republic) Karolína Muchová (France) Kristina Mladenovic	(Russia) Veronika Kudermetova (Russia) Ekaterina Alexandrova (Belgium) Kirsten Flipkens (Netherlands) Kiki Bertens
14 Oct	Kremlin Cup; Moscow, Russia; WTA Premier; Hard (i) – $1,032,000 – 28S/32Q/16D; Singles – Doubles	(Japan) Shuko Aoyama (Japan) Ena Shibahara; 6–2, 6–1	(Belgium) Kirsten Flipkens (United States) Bethanie Mattek-Sands	(Czech Republic) Karolína Muchová (France) Kristina Mladenovic	(Russia) Veronika Kudermetova (Russia) Ekaterina Alexandrova (Belgium) Kirsten Flipkens (Netherlands) Kiki Bertens
14 Oct	Luxembourg Open; Kockelscheuer, Luxembourg; WTA International; Hard (i) – $250,000 – 32S/32Q/16D; Singles – Doubles	(Latvia) Jeļena Ostapenko; 6–4, 6–1	(Germany) Julia Görges	(Russia) Anna Blinkova (Kazakhstan) Elena Rybakina	(Germany) Antonia Lottner (Russia) Margarita Gasparyan (Germany) Laura Siegemund (Puerto Rico) Monica Puig
14 Oct	Luxembourg Open; Kockelscheuer, Luxembourg; WTA International; Hard (i) – $250,000 – 32S/32Q/16D; Singles – Doubles	(United States) Coco Gauff (United States) Caty McNally; 6–2, 6–2	(United States) Kaitlyn Christian (Chile) Alexa Guarachi	(Russia) Anna Blinkova (Kazakhstan) Elena Rybakina	(Germany) Antonia Lottner (Russia) Margarita Gasparyan (Germany) Laura Siegemund (Puerto Rico) Monica Puig
21 Oct	WTA Elite Trophy; Zhuhai, China; Year-end championships Hard – $2,419,844 – 12S (RR)/6D (RR); Singles – Doubles	(Belarus) Aryna Sabalenka; 6–4, 6–2	(Netherlands) Kiki Bertens	(China) Zheng Saisai (Czech Republic) Karolína Muchová	Round robin (Ukraine) Dayana Yastremska (Croatia) Donna Vekić (United States) Sofia Kenin (United States) Alison Riske (Croatia) Petra Martić (United States) Madison Keys (Belgium) Elise Mertens (Greece) Maria Sakkari
21 Oct	WTA Elite Trophy; Zhuhai, China; Year-end championships Hard – $2,419,844 – 12S (RR)/6D (RR); Singles – Doubles	(Ukraine) Lyudmyla Kichenok (Slovenia) Andreja Klepač; 6–3, 6–3	(China) Duan Yingying (China) Yang Zhaoxuan	(China) Zheng Saisai (Czech Republic) Karolína Muchová	Round robin (Ukraine) Dayana Yastremska (Croatia) Donna Vekić (United States) Sofia Kenin (United States) Alison Riske (Croatia) Petra Martić (United States) Madison Keys (Belgium) Elise Mertens (Greece) Maria Sakkari
28 Oct	WTA Finals; Shenzhen, China; Year-end championships Hard (i) – $14,000,000 – 8S (RR)/8D (RR); Singles – Doubles	(Australia) Ashleigh Barty; 6–4, 6–3	(Ukraine) Elina Svitolina	(Czech Republic) Karolína Plíšková (Switzerland) Belinda Bencic	Round robin (Netherlands) Kiki Bertens (Japan) Naomi Osaka (Czech Republic) Petra Kvitová (Romania) Simona Halep (Canada) Bianca Andreescu (United States) Sofia Kenin
28 Oct	WTA Finals; Shenzhen, China; Year-end championships Hard (i) – $14,000,000 – 8S (RR)/8D (RR); Singles – Doubles	(Hungary) Tímea Babos (France) Kristina Mladenovic; 6–1, 6–3	(Chinese Taipei) Hsieh Su-wei (Czech Republic) Barbora Strýcová	(Czech Republic) Karolína Plíšková (Switzerland) Belinda Bencic	Round robin (Netherlands) Kiki Bertens (Japan) Naomi Osaka (Czech Republic) Petra Kvitová (Romania) Simona Halep (Canada) Bianca Andreescu (United States) Sofia Kenin

=== November ===
Week	Tournament	Champions	Runners-up	Semifinalists	Quarterfinalists
4 Nov	Fed Cup Final; Perth, Australia – hard	France; 3–2	Australia	Romania; Belarus	Czech Republic; Belgium; Germany; United States

=== Cancelled ===
Week	Tournament	Champions	Runners-up	Semifinalists	Quarterfinalists
7 Oct	Hong Kong Open; Hong Kong; WTA International; Hard – $500,000 – 32S/24Q/16D; Singles – Doubles	Cancelled due to ongoing political unrest.			

== Statistical information ==
These tables present the number of singles (S), doubles (D), and mixed doubles (X) titles won by each player and each nation during the season, within all the tournament categories of the 2019 WTA Tour: the Grand Slam tournaments, the year-end championships (the WTA Tour Championships and the WTA Elite Trophy), the WTA Premier tournaments (Premier Mandatory, Premier 5, and regular Premier), and the WTA International tournaments. The players/nations are sorted by:

1. total number of titles (a doubles title won by two players representing the same nation counts as only one win for the nation);
2. cumulated importance of those titles (one Grand Slam win equalling two Premier Mandatory/Premier 5 wins, one year-end championships win equalling one-and-a-half Premier Mandatory/Premier 5 win, one Premier Mandatory/Premier 5 win equalling two Premier wins, one Premier win equalling two International wins);
3. a singles > doubles > mixed doubles hierarchy;
4. alphabetical order (by family names for players).

=== Key ===
Grand Slam tournaments
Year-end championships
WTA Premier Mandatory
WTA Premier 5
WTA Premier
WTA International

=== Titles won by player ===
Total	Player	Grand Slam			Year-end		Premier Mandatory		Premier 5		Premier		International		Total		
Total	Player	S	D	X	S	D	S	D	S	D	S	D	S	D	S	D	X
6	Aryna Sabalenka (BLR)		●		●			● ●	●				●		3	3	0
6	Latisha Chan (TPE)			● ●								● ● ●		●	0	4	2
5	Ashleigh Barty (AUS)	●			●		●			●	●				4	1	0
5	Sofia Kenin (USA)							●					● ● ●	●	3	2	0
4	Elise Mertens (BEL)		●					● ●			●				1	3	0
4	Hsieh Su-wei (TPE)		●					●		●		●			0	4	0
4	Barbora Strýcová (CZE)		●					●		●		●			0	4	0
4	Karolína Plíšková (CZE)								●		● ● ●				4	0	0
4	Chan Hao-ching (TPE)											● ● ●		●	0	4	0
3	Bianca Andreescu (CAN)	●					●		●						3	0	0
3	Naomi Osaka (JPN)	●					●				●				3	0	0
3	Tímea Babos (HUN)		●			●								●	0	3	0
3	Kristina Mladenovic (FRA)		●			●								●	0	3	0
3	Barbora Krejčíková (CZE)			●						●				●	0	2	1
3	Kateřina Siniaková (CZE)									●		●		●	0	3	0
3	Nicole Melichar (USA)											● ● ●			0	3	0
3	Květa Peschke (CZE)											● ● ●			0	3	0
3	Shuko Aoyama (JPN)											●		● ●	0	3	0
3	Coco Gauff (USA)												●	● ●	1	2	0
2	Bethanie Mattek-Sands (USA)			●				●							0	1	1
2	Andreja Klepač (SLO)					●				●					0	2	0
2	Kiki Bertens (NED)						●				●				2	0	0
2	Belinda Bencic (SUI)								●		●				2	0	0
2	Madison Keys (USA)								●		●				2	0	0
2	Victoria Azarenka (BLR)									●				●	0	2	0
2	Petra Kvitová (CZE)										● ●				2	0	0
2	Zheng Saisai (CHN)										●			●	1	1	0
2	Aleksandra Krunić (SRB)											●		●	0	2	0
2	Ena Shibahara (JPN)											●		●	0	2	0
2	Rebecca Peterson (SWE)												● ●		2	0	0
2	Jil Teichmann (SUI)												● ●		2	0	0
2	Alison Van Uytvanck (BEL)												● ●		2	0	0
2	Dayana Yastremska (UKR)												● ●		2	0	0
2	Nao Hibino (JPN)												●	●	1	1	0
2	Viktória Kužmová (SVK)													● ●	0	2	0
2	María José Martínez Sánchez (ESP)													● ●	0	2	0
2	Caty McNally (USA)													● ●	0	2	0
2	Peng Shuai (CHN)													● ●	0	2	0
1	Simona Halep (ROU)	●													1	0	0
1	Samantha Stosur (AUS)		●												0	1	0
1	Zhang Shuai (CHN)		●												0	1	0
1	Lyudmyla Kichenok (UKR)					●									0	1	0
1	Duan Yingying (CHN)									●					0	1	0
1	Lucie Hradecká (CZE)									●					0	1	0
1	Veronika Kudermetova (RUS)									●					0	1	0
1	Mona Barthel (GER)											●			0	1	0
1	Anna-Lena Friedsam (GER)											●			0	1	0
1	Margarita Gasparyan (RUS)											●			0	1	0
1	Anna-Lena Grönefeld (GER)											●			0	1	0
1	Ekaterina Makarova (RUS)											●			0	1	0
1	Alicja Rosolska (POL)											●			0	1	0
1	Amanda Anisimova (USA)												●		1	0	0
1	Fiona Ferro (FRA)												●		1	0	0
1	Caroline Garcia (FRA)												●		1	0	0
1	Julia Görges (GER)												●		1	0	0
1	Polona Hercog (SLO)												●		1	0	0
1	Magda Linette (POL)												●		1	0	0
1	Petra Martić (CRO)												●		1	0	0
1	Karolína Muchová (CZE)												●		1	0	0
1	Garbiñe Muguruza (ESP)												●		1	0	0
1	Jeļena Ostapenko (LAT)												●		1	0	0
1	Jessica Pegula (USA)												●		1	0	0
1	Yulia Putintseva (KAZ)												●		1	0	0
1	Alison Riske (USA)												●		1	0	0
1	Elena Rybakina (KAZ)												●		1	0	0
1	Maria Sakkari (GRE)												●		1	0	0
1	Anastasija Sevastova (LAT)												●		1	0	0
1	Wang Yafan (CHN)												●		1	0	0
1	Ekaterina Alexandrova (RUS)													●	0	1	0
1	Lara Arruabarrena (ESP)													●	0	1	0
1	Irina-Camelia Begu (ROU)													●	0	1	0
1	Eugenie Bouchard (CAN)													●	0	1	0
1	Hayley Carter (USA)													●	0	1	0
1	Sorana Cîrstea (ROU)													●	0	1	0
1	Gabriela Dabrowski (CAN)													●	0	1	0
1	Misaki Doi (JPN)													●	0	1	0
1	Sharon Fichman (CAN)													●	0	1	0
1	Kirsten Flipkens (BEL)													●	0	1	0
1	Daria Gavrilova (AUS)													●	0	1	0
1	Zoe Hives (AUS)													●	0	1	0
1	Darija Jurak (CRO)													●	0	1	0
1	Anna Kalinskaya (RUS)													●	0	1	0
1	Desirae Krawczyk (USA)													●	0	1	0
1	Johanna Larsson (SWE)													●	0	1	0
1	Cornelia Lister (SWE)													●	0	1	0
1	Tatjana Maria (GER)													●	0	1	0
1	Andreea Mitu (ROU)													●	0	1	0
1	Asia Muhammad (USA)													●	0	1	0
1	Monica Niculescu (ROU)													●	0	1	0
1	Giuliana Olmos (MEX)													●	0	1	0
1	Ellen Perez (AUS)													●	0	1	0
1	Kristýna Plíšková (CZE)													●	0	1	0
1	Anastasia Potapova (RUS)													●	0	1	0
1	Maria Sanchez (USA)													●	0	1	0
1	Astra Sharma (AUS)													●	0	1	0
1	Laura Siegemund (GER)													●	0	1	0
1	Yana Sizikova (RUS)													●	0	1	0
1	Sara Sorribes Tormo (ESP)													●	0	1	0
1	Luisa Stefani (BRA)													●	0	1	0
1	Nina Stojanović (SRB)													●	0	1	0
1	Renata Voráčová (CZE)													●	0	1	0
1	Wang Xinyu (CHN)													●	0	1	0
1	Xu Yifan (CHN)													●	0	1	0
1	Yang Zhaoxuan (CHN)													●	0	1	0
1	Zhu Lin (CHN)													●	0	1	0
1	Vera Zvonareva (RUS)													●	0	1	0

=== Titles won by nation ===
Total	Nation	Grand Slam			Year-end		Premier Mandatory		Premier 5		Premier		International		Total		
Total	Nation	S	D	X	S	D	S	D	S	D	S	D	S	D	S	D	X
21	Czech Republic (CZE)		1	1				1	1	3	5	5	1	3	7	13	1
20	United States (USA)			1				1	1		1	3	7	6	9	10	1
10	Chinese Taipei (TPE)		1	2				1		1		4		1	0	8	2
9	China (CHN)		1							1	1		1	5	2	7	0
8	Australia (AUS)	1	1		1		1			1	1			2	4	4	0
8	Japan (JPN)	1					1				1	1	1	3	4	4	0
8	Belarus (BLR)		1		1			2	1	1			1	1	3	5	0
7	Belgium (BEL)		1					2			1		2	1	3	4	0
6	Canada (CAN)	1					1		1					3	3	3	0
5	France (FRA)		1			1							2	1	2	3	0
5	Russia (RUS)									1		1		3	0	5	0
5	Germany (GER)											2	1	2	1	4	0
4	Switzerland (SUI)								1		1		2		4	0	0
4	Sweden (SWE)												2	2	2	2	0
4	Spain (ESP)												1	3	1	3	0
3	Romania (ROU)	1												2	1	2	0
3	Hungary (HUN)		1			1								1	0	3	0
3	Slovenia (SLO)					1				1			1		1	2	0
3	Ukraine (UKR)					1							2		2	1	0
3	Serbia (SRB)											1		2	0	3	0
2	Netherlands (NED)						1				1				2	0	0
2	Poland (POL)											1	1		1	1	0
2	Kazakhstan (KAZ)												2		2	0	0
2	Latvia (LAT)												2		2	0	0
2	Croatia (CRO)												1	1	1	1	0
2	Slovakia (SVK)													2	0	2	0
1	Greece (GRE)												1		1	0	0
1	Brazil (BRA)													1	0	1	0
1	Mexico (MEX)													1	0	1	0

=== Titles information ===
The following players won their first main circuit title in singles, doubles, or mixed doubles:

Singles

- (United States) Sofia Kenin – Hobart (draw)
- (China) Wang Yafan – Acapulco (draw)
- (Canada) Bianca Andreescu – Indian Wells (draw)
- (United States) Amanda Anisimova – Bogotá (draw)
- (Croatia) Petra Martić – İstanbul (draw)
- (Switzerland) Jil Teichmann – Prague (draw)
- (Greece) Maria Sakkari – Rabat (draw)
- (Kazakhstan) Yulia Putintseva – Nuremberg (draw)
- (France) Fiona Ferro – Lausanne (draw)
- (Kazakhstan) Elena Rybakina – Bucharest (draw)
- (United States) Jessica Pegula – Washington, D.C. (draw)
- (China) Zheng Saisai – San Jose (draw)
- (Poland) Magda Linette – The Bronx (draw)
- (Sweden) Rebecca Peterson – Nanchang (draw)
- (Czech Republic) Karolína Muchová – Seoul (draw)
- (United States) Coco Gauff – Linz (draw)

Doubles

- (Canada) Eugenie Bouchard – Auckland (draw)
- (United States) Sofia Kenin – Auckland (draw)
- (Russia) Ekaterina Alexandrova – Budapest (draw)
- (Belarus) Aryna Sabalenka – Indian Wells (draw)
- (Australia) Zoe Hives – Bogotá (draw)
- (Australia) Astra Sharma – Bogotá (draw)
- (Germany) Anna-Lena Friedsam – Stuttgart (draw)
- (Russia) Anna Kalinskaya – Prague (draw)
- (Slovakia) Viktória Kužmová – Prague (draw)
- (Australia) Ellen Perez – Strasbourg (draw)
- (Mexico) Giuliana Olmos – Nottingham (draw)
- (Russia) Yana Sizikova – Lausanne (draw)
- (Sweden) Cornelia Lister – Palermo (draw)
- (Serbia) Nina Stojanović – Jūrmala (draw)
- (United States) Coco Gauff – Washington (draw)
- (United States) Caty McNally – Washington (draw)
- (China) Wang Xinyu – Nanchang (draw)
- (China) Zhu Lin – Nanchang (draw)
- (Russia) Veronika Kudermetova – Wuhan (draw)
- (United States) Hayley Carter – Tashkent (draw)
- (Brazil) Luisa Stefani – Tashkent (draw)
- (Japan) Ena Shibahara – Tianjin (draw)

Mixed doubles

- (Czech Republic) Barbora Krejčíková – **Australian Open (draw)**

The following players defended a main circuit title in singles, doubles, or mixed doubles:

Singles

- (Germany) Julia Görges – Auckland (draw)
- (Belgium) Alison Van Uytvanck – Budapest (draw)
- (Spain) Garbiñe Muguruza – Monterrey (draw)
- (Belarus) Aryna Sabalenka – Wuhan (draw)

Doubles

- (Australia) Ashleigh Barty – Rome (draw)
- (Czech Republic) Květa Peschke – San Jose (draw)
- (Czech Republic) Lucie Hradecká – Cincinnati (draw)
- (Ukraine) Lyudmyla Kichenok – WTA Elite Trophy (draw)
- (Hungary) Tímea Babos – WTA Finals (draw)
- (France) Kristina Mladenovic – WTA Finals (draw)

Mixed doubles

- (Chinese Taipei) Latisha Chan – **French Open (draw)**
- (United States) Bethanie Mattek-Sands – **US Open (draw)**

=== Best ranking ===
The following players achieved their career high ranking in this season inside top 50 (in bold the players who entered the top 10 for the first time):

Singles

- (Japan) Naomi Osaka (reached place **No. 1** on January 28)
- (United States) Danielle Collins (reached place No. 23 on January 28)
- **(Belarus) Aryna Sabalenka** (reached place **No. 9** on February 4)
- (Ukraine) Lesia Tsurenko (reached place No. 23 on February 18)
- (Slovakia) Viktória Kužmová (reached place No. 43 on March 4)
- (Estonia) Anett Kontaveit (reached place No. 14 on April 1)
- (Australia) Ajla Tomljanović (reached place No. 39 on April 1)
- (Netherlands) Kiki Bertens (reached place **No. 4** on May 13)
- **(Australia) Ashleigh Barty** (reached place **No. 1** on June 24)
- (Czech Republic) Markéta Vondroušová (reached place No. 14 on July 1)
- (China) Zheng Saisai (reached place No. 37 on August 19)
- (Poland) Iga Świątek (reached place No. 49 on August 19)
- (China) Wang Qiang (reached place No. 12 on September 9)
- (Poland) Magda Linette (reached place No. 41 on September 30)
- (Russia) Ekaterina Alexandrova (reached place No. 35 on October 7)
- (China) Wang Yafan (reached place No. 47 on October 7)
- **(Canada) Bianca Andreescu** (reached place **No. 4** on October 21)
- (United States) Sofia Kenin (reached place No. 12 on October 21)
- (Croatia) Petra Martić (reached place No. 15 on October 21)
- (Croatia) Donna Vekić (reached place No. 20 on October 21)
- (United States) Amanda Anisimova (reached place No. 21 on October 21)
- (Greece) Maria Sakkari (reached place No. 22 on October 21)
- (Kazakhstan) Elena Rybakina (reached place No. 37 on October 21)
- (Russia) Veronika Kudermetova (reached place No. 41 on October 21)
- (Sweden) Rebecca Peterson (reached place No. 43 on October 21)
- (United States) Alison Riske (reached place No. 18 on November 4)
- (Czech Republic) Karolína Muchová (reached place No. 21 on November 4)
- (Ukraine) Dayana Yastremska (reached place No. 22 on November 4)

Doubles

- (United States) Nicole Melichar (reached place No. 12 on February 18)
- (United States) Kaitlyn Christian (reached place No. 38 on February 25)
- (United Kingdom) Heather Watson (reached place No. 39 on February 25)
- (Russia) Irina Khromacheva (reached place No. 41 on April 8)
- (China) **Zhang Shuai** (reached place **No. 9** on May 20)
- (Japan) Eri Hozumi (reached place No. 28 on May 27)
- (France) Kristina Mladenovic (reached place **No. 1** on June 10)
- (Poland) Alicja Rosolska (reached place No. 23 on June 10)
- (Belgium) Kirsten Flipkens (reached place No. 23 on July 1)
- (Czech Republic) Barbora Strýcová (reached place **No. 1** on July 15)
- (China) Han Xinyun (reached place No. 50 on July 29)
- (United States) Asia Muhammad (reached place No. 37 on August 5)
- (United States) Jennifer Brady (reached place No. 44 on August 19)
- **(Belgium) Elise Mertens** (reached place **No. 2** on September 9)
- (China) Xu Yifan (reached place **No. 8** on September 9)
- (Germany) Anna-Lena Friedsam (reached place No. 45 on September 9)
- (Slovakia) Viktória Kužmová (reached place No. 29 on September 16)
- (United States) Alison Riske (reached place No. 43 on September 16)
- (Serbia) Aleksandra Krunić (reached place No. 35 on September 30)
- (Latvia) Jeļena Ostapenko (reached place No. 22 on October 7)
- (Russia) Veronika Kudermetova (reached place No. 23 on October 14)
- **(Belarus) Aryna Sabalenka** (reached place **No. 2** on October 21)
- (China) Duan Yingying (reached place No. 17 on October 21)
- (Japan) Shuko Aoyama (reached place No. 26 on October 21)
- (Japan) Ena Shibahara (reached place No. 31 on October 21)
- (United States) Desirae Krawczyk (reached place No. 36 on October 21)
- (United States) Sofia Kenin (reached place No. 39 on October 21)
- (Belarus) Aliaksandra Sasnovich (reached place No. 46 on October 21)

== WTA rankings ==
These are the WTA rankings and yearly WTA Race rankings of the top 20 singles and doubles players at the current date of the 2019 season.

=== Singles ===
Final WTA Singles race rankings
No.	Player	Points	Move^{†}	Tourn
1	Ashleigh Barty (AUS)	6,476	Steady	14
2	Karolína Plíšková (CZE)	5,315	Steady	18
3	Naomi Osaka (JPN)	5,246	Steady	16
4	Simona Halep (ROU)	4,962	Steady	16
5	Bianca Andreescu (CAN)	4,942	Steady	14
6	Petra Kvitová (CZE)	4,401	Steady	16
7	Belinda Bencic (SUI)	4,120	▲3	24
8	Elina Svitolina (UKR)	3,995	▼1	21
9	Serena Williams (USA)	3,935	▼1	10
10	Kiki Bertens (NED)	3,870	▼1	26
11	Johanna Konta (GBR)	2,879	Steady	17
12	Sofia Kenin (USA)	2,615	Steady	23
13	Madison Keys (USA)	2,607	Steady	14
14	Aryna Sabalenka (BLR)	2,520	Steady	23
15	Petra Martić (CRO)	2,458	Steady	17
16	Markéta Vondroušová (CZE)	2,390	Steady	11
17	Angelique Kerber (GER)	2,275	Steady	21
18	Elise Mertens (BEL)	2,190	Steady	25
19	Alison Riske (USA)	2,185	Steady	23
20	Donna Vekić (CRO)	2,185	Steady	22

Champion
Runner-up

Player competed at the 2019 WTA Finals

WTA Singles Year-End Rankings
#	Player	Points	#Trn	'18 Rk	High	Low	'18→'19
1	Ashleigh Barty (AUS)	7,851	15	15	1	15	▲14
2	Karolína Plíšková (CZE)	5,940	19	8	2	8	▲6
3	Naomi Osaka (JPN)	5,496	17	5	1	5	▲2
4	Simona Halep (ROU)	5,462	17	1	1	8	▼3
5	Bianca Andreescu (CAN)	5,192	15	178	4	178	▲173
6	Elina Svitolina (UKR)	5,075	22	4	3	9	▼2
7	Petra Kvitová (CZE)	4,776	17	7	2	8	Steady
8	Belinda Bencic (SUI)	4,745	22	37	7	55	▲29
9	Kiki Bertens (NED)	4,245	27	9	4	10	Steady
10	Serena Williams (USA)	3,935	10	16	8	16	▲6
11	Aryna Sabalenka (BLR)	3,120	24	11	9	16	Steady
12	Johanna Konta (GBR)	2,879	17	39	11	47	▲27
13	Madison Keys (USA)	2,767	15	17	9	18	▲4
14	Sofia Kenin (USA)	2,740	24	52	12	56	▲38
15	Petra Martić (CRO)	2,617	18	32	15	53	▲17
16	Markéta Vondroušová (CZE)	2,390	12	67	14	81	▲51
17	Elise Mertens (BEL)	2,290	26	13	12	26	▼4
18	Alison Riske (USA)	2,210	24	63	18	63	▲45
19	Donna Vekić (CRO)	2,205	23	34	19	34	▲15
20	Angelique Kerber (GER)	2,175	22	2	2	20	▼18

==== Number 1 ranking ====
Holder	Date gained	Date forfeited
Simona Halep (ROU)	Year end 2018	27 January 2019
Naomi Osaka (JPN)	28 January 2019	23 June 2019
Ashleigh Barty (AUS)	24 June 2019	11 August 2019
Naomi Osaka (JPN)	12 August 2019	8 September 2019
Ashleigh Barty (AUS)	9 September 2019	Year end 2019

=== Doubles ===
Final Doubles team race rankings
No.	Team	Points	Tourn
1	Elise Mertens (BEL); Aryna Sabalenka (BLR)	6,057	11
2	Hsieh Su-wei (TPE); Barbora Strýcová (CZE)	5,490	13
3	Tímea Babos (HUN); Kristina Mladenovic (FRA)	5,211	10
4	Gabriela Dabrowski (CAN); Xu Yifan (CHN)	4,635	20
5	Chan Hao-ching (TPE); Latisha Chan (TPE)	4,145	20
6	Barbora Krejčíková (CZE); Kateřina Siniaková (CZE)	4,000	11
7	Samantha Stosur (AUS); Zhang Shuai (CHN)	3,920	13
8	Anna-Lena Grönefeld (GER); Demi Schuurs (NED)	3,895	15
9	Victoria Azarenka (BLR); Ashleigh Barty (AUS)	3,440	8
10	Nicole Melichar (USA); Květa Peschke (CZE)	3,415	25

Champions
Runners-up

Team competed at the 2019 WTA Finals

WTA Doubles Year-End Rankings
#	Player	Points	#Trn	'18 Rk	High	Low	'18→'19
1	Barbora Strýcová (CZE)	7,110	17	5	1	5	▲4
2	Kristina Mladenovic (FRA)	6,990	14	3	1	5	▲1
3	Tímea Babos (HUN)	6,965	15	3	2	6	Steady
4	Hsieh Su-wei (TPE)	6,705	19	17	4	25	▲13
5	Aryna Sabalenka (BLR)	6,655	13	61	2	85	▲56
6	Elise Mertens (BEL)	6,615	14	11	2	12	▲5
7	Kateřina Siniaková (CZE)	4,955	19	1	1	8	▼7
8	Gabriela Dabrowski (CAN)	4,950	24	10	8	15	▲2
8	Xu Yifan (CHN)	4,950	22	12	8	18	▲4
10	Zhang Shuai (CHN)	4,705	21	33	9	33	▲23
11	Anna-Lena Grönefeld (GER)	4,670	22	26	10	33	▲15
12	Samantha Stosur (AUS)	4,535	15	69	10	70	▲57
13	Barbora Krejčíková (CZE)	4,490	13	1	1	14	▼12
14	Demi Schuurs (NED)	4,390	22	8	7	17	▼6
15	Chan Hao-ching (TPE)	4,280	21	25	11	23	▲10
15	Latisha Chan (TPE)	4,280	21	21	11	21	▲6
17	Duan Yingying (CHN)	3,800	22	59	17	83	▲42
18	Victoria Azarenka (BLR)	3,731	11	272	18	274	▲254
19	Ashleigh Barty (AUS)	3,635	10	7	6	19	▼12
20	Nicole Melichar (USA)	3,465	27	15	12	20	▼5

==== Number 1 ranking ====
Holder	Date gained	Date forfeited
Barbora Krejčíková (CZE); Kateřina Siniaková (CZE)	Year end 2018	13 January 2019
Kateřina Siniaková (CZE)	14 January 2019	9 June 2019
Kristina Mladenovic (FRA)	10 June 2019	14 July 2019
Barbora Strýcová (CZE)	15 July 2019	6 October 2019
Kristina Mladenovic (FRA)	7 October 2019	20 October 2019
Barbora Strýcová (CZE)	21 October 2019	Year end 2019

== Points distribution ==
Category	W	F	SF	QF	R16	R32	R64	R128	Q	Q3	Q2	Q1
Grand Slam (S)	2000	1300	780	430	240	130	70	10	40	30	20	2
Grand Slam (D)	2000	1300	780	430	240	130	10	–	40	–	–	–
WTA Finals (S)	1500*	1080*	750*	(+125 per round robin match; +125 per round robin win)								
WTA Finals (D)	1500	1080	750	375	–							
WTA Premier Mandatory (96S)	1000	650	390	215	120	65	35	10	30	–	20	2
WTA Premier Mandatory (64/60S)	1000	650	390	215	120	65	10	–	30	–	20	2
WTA Premier Mandatory (28/32D)	1000	650	390	215	120	10	–	–	–	–	–	–
WTA Premier 5 (56S, 64Q)	900	585	350	190	105	60	1	–	30	22	15	1
WTA Premier 5 (56S, 48/32Q)	900	585	350	190	105	60	1	–	30	–	20	1
WTA Premier 5 (28D)	900	585	350	190	105	1	–	–	–	–	–	–
WTA Premier 5 (16D)	900	585	350	190	1	–	–	–	–	–	–	–
WTA Premier (56S)	470	305	185	100	55	30	1	–	25	–	13	1
WTA Premier (32/30/28S)	470	305	185	100	55	1	–	–	25	18	13	1
WTA Premier (16D)	470	305	185	100	1	–	–	–	–	–	–	–
WTA Elite Trophy (S)	700*	440*	240*	(+40 per round robin match; +80 per round robin win)								
WTA International (32S, 32Q)	280	180	110	60	30	1	–	–	18	14	10	1
WTA International (32S, 24/16Q)	280	180	110	60	30	1	–	–	18	-	12	1
WTA International (16D)	280	180	110	60	1	–	–	–	–	–	–	–

S = singles players, D = doubles teams, Q = qualification players.
* Assumes undefeated round robin match record.

== WTA fan polls ==
=== Player of the month ===
Month	Winner	Other candidates
January	Naomi Osaka (JPN)	Petra Kvitová (CZE); Karolína Plíšková (CZE)
February	Belinda Bencic (SUI)	Simona Halep (ROU); Elise Mertens (BEL); Petra Kvitová (CZE)
March	Ashleigh Barty (AUS)	Bianca Andreescu (CAN); Karolína Plíšková (CZE); Angelique Kerber (GER)
April	Petra Kvitová (CZE)	Petra Martić (CRO); Madison Keys (USA)
May	Kiki Bertens (NED)	Simona Halep (ROU); Karolína Plíšková (CZE); Johanna Konta (GBR)
June	Ashleigh Barty (AUS)	Karolína Plíšková (CZE); Caroline Garcia (FRA); Sofia Kenin (USA)
July	Simona Halep (ROU)	Serena Williams (USA); Anastasija Sevastova (LAT); Jil Teichmann (SUI)
August	Bianca Andreescu (CAN)	Serena Williams (USA); Madison Keys (USA)
September	Naomi Osaka (JPN)	Aryna Sabalenka (BLR); Karolína Plíšková (CZE)
October	Ashleigh Barty (AUS)	Elina Svitolina (UKR); Aryna Sabalenka (BLR)

=== Breakthrough of the month ===
Month	Winner	Other candidates
January	Dayana Yastremska (UKR)	Danielle Collins (USA); Amanda Anisimova (USA); Ashleigh Barty (AUS)
February	Hsieh Su-wei (TPE)	Bianca Andreescu (CAN); Wang Yafan (CHN); Sofia Kenin (USA)
March	Bianca Andreescu (CAN)	Markéta Vondroušová (CZE); Hsieh Su-wei (TPE); Anett Kontaveit (EST)
April	Maria Sakkari (GRE)	Jil Teichmann (SUI); Karolína Muchová (CZE); Amanda Anisimova (USA)
May	Markéta Vondroušová (CZE)	Kiki Bertens (NED); Yulia Putintseva (KAZ); Chloé Paquet (FRA)
June	Iga Świątek (POL)	Petra Martić (CRO); Markéta Vondroušová (CZE); Amanda Anisimova (USA)
July	Barbora Strýcová (CZE)	Elena Rybakina (KAZ); Karolína Muchová (CZE); Fiona Ferro (FRA)
August	Marie Bouzková (CZE)	Belinda Bencic (SUI); Coco Gauff (USA); Sofia Kenin (USA)
September	Alison Riske (USA)	Karolína Muchová (CZE); Elena Rybakina (KAZ); Rebecca Peterson (SWE)
October	Karolína Muchová (CZE)	Belinda Bencic (SUI); Sofia Kenin (USA)

=== Shot of the month ===
Month	Winner	Other candidates
January	Hsieh Su-wei (TPE)	Amanda Anisimova (USA); Bianca Andreescu (CAN); Ashleigh Barty (AUS); Anna Karolína Schmiedlová (SVK)
February	Simona Halep (ROU)	Elina Svitolina (UKR); Donna Vekić (CRO); Sofia Kenin (USA); Caroline Garcia (FRA)
March	Kirsten Flipkens (BEL)	Hsieh Su-wei (TPE); Simona Halep (ROU); Karolína Plíšková (CZE); Serena Williams (USA)
April	Iga Świątek (POL)	Victoria Azarenka (BLR); Andrea Petkovic (GER); Kirsten Flipkens (BEL); Angelique Kerber (GER)
May	Simona Halep (ROU)	Markéta Vondroušová (CZE); Serena Williams (USA); Dayana Yastremska (UKR)
June	Caroline Wozniacki (DEN)	Ashleigh Barty (AUS); Simona Halep (ROU); Maria Sharapova (RUS); Angelique Kerber (GER)
July	Patricia Maria Țig (ROU)	Irina Bara (ROU); Anastasija Sevastova (LAT); Kiki Bertens (NED); Katarzyna Kawa (POL)
August	Bethanie Mattek-Sands (USA) / CoCo Vandeweghe (USA)	Bianca Andreescu (CAN); Simona Halep (ROU); Madison Keys (USA)
September	Monica Puig (PUR)	Naomi Osaka (JPN); Jana Fett (CRO); Petra Martić (CRO)
October	Elina Svitolina (UKR)	Aryna Sabalenka (BLR); Dayana Yastremska (UKR); Ons Jabeur (TUN)

== Retirements ==
Following is a list of notable players (winners of a main tour title, and/or part of the WTA rankings top 100 [singles] or top 100 [doubles] for at least one week) who announced their retirement from professional tennis, became inactive (after not playing for more than 52 weeks), or were permanently banned from playing, during the 2019 season:

- Raquel Atawo (born 8 December 1982 in Fresno, California, United States)
- Julia Boserup (born 9 September 1991 in Santa Monica, United States) joined the professional tour in 2010 and reached a career-high ranking of no. 80 in singles and 277 in doubles. Boserup played the majority of her career on the ITF Women's Circuit, where she won 3 singles titles and 1 doubles title. Her greatest achievement at Grand Slam level came at Wimbledon in 2016 where she reached the third round as a qualifier. After having not played in over a year, Boserup decided to retire in May 2019, citing ongoing injury problems.
- Dominika Cibulková (born 6 May 1989 in Bratislava, Czechoslovakia (present-day Slovakia)) joined the professional tour in 2004 and reached a career-high ranking of no. 4 in singles and no. 59 in doubles. She won eight WTA singles titles, including her victory at the 2016 WTA Finals. She reached six Grand Slam quarterfinals, including the final at the 2014 Australian Open, which she lost to Li Na. Cibulková announced her retirement on 12 November 2019, citing injury problems.
- Mariana Duque Mariño (born 12 August 1989 in Bogotá, Colombia) joined the professional tour in 2005 and reached a career-high ranking of no. 66 in singles and no. 96 in doubles. She won one WTA singles title at her home tournament in Bogotá in 2010, as well as 1 WTA doubles title and 19 singles titles on the ITF Women's Circuit.
- (Israel) Julia Glushko (born 1 January 1990 in Donetsk, Ukraine)
- Anna-Lena Grönefeld (born 4 June 1985 in Nordhorn, West Germany) joined the professional tour in 2003 and reached a career-high ranking of number 14 in singles and number 7 in doubles (both in 2006). She has won 1 WTA singles title and 17 WTA doubles titles including 2 Grand Slam titles at the 2014 French Open Mixed doubles and 2009 Wimbledon Mixed doubles events. Additionally she won one doubles title at the WTA 125K level, 6 ITF doubles titles and 11 ITF singles titles. She announced her retirement from the tour in December 2019 citing that she wishes to start a family.
- María Irigoyen (born 24 June 1987 in Tandil, Argentina) joined the professional tour in 2005 and reached a career-high ranking of no. 147 in singles and no. 47 in doubles. Irigoyen was primarily a doubles specialist, winning two titles at the Rio Open in 2014 and 2016, as well as two golds and one bronze medal representing Argentina in the Pan American Games.
- (Finland) Emma Laine (born 26 March 1986 in Karlstad, Sweden) joined the professional tour in 2004 and reached a career-high ranking of no. 50 in singles and no. 64 in doubles. She won 11 singles titles and 44 doubles titles on the ITF Women's Circuit. Laine announced her last tournament would be the 2019 Fed Cup.
- An-Sophie Mestach (born 7 March 1994 in Ghent, Belgium) joined the professional tour in 2009 and reached a career-high ranking of no. 98 in singles and no. 64 in doubles. She won two doubles titles on the WTA Tour, as well as six singles titles on the ITF Women's Circuit. Mestach was also the junior no. 1 in 2011 and she was the winner of the 2011 Australian Open girls' singles event. Mestach announced her retirement in January 2019 to pursue a career as a policewoman.
- Arantxa Parra Santonja (born 9 November 1982 in Valencia, Spain) joined the professional tour in 2000 and reached a career-high ranking of no. 46 in singles and no. 22 in doubles. Parra Santonja won 11 WTA doubles titles, as well as 11 singles titles on the ITF Women's Circuit.
- Lucie Šafářová (born 4 February 1987 in Brno, Czechoslovakia (present-day Czech Republic)) joined the professional tour in 2002 and reached a career-high ranking of no. 5 in singles and no. 1 in doubles. She won seven singles titles and fifteen doubles titles on the WTA Tour, as well as seven singles titles on the ITF Women's Circuit. She reached one Grand Slam singles final at the French Open in 2015, and claimed 5 Grand Slam doubles titles alongside Bethanie Mattek-Sands. Šafářová originally announced that the 2019 Australian Open would be her final tournament, but it would be delayed for further recovery on wrist tendinitis. She played her final competitive match alongside Dominika Cibulková in the first round of the women's doubles at the French Open.
- Barbora Štefková (born 4 April 1995 in Olomouc, Czech Republic)

== Comebacks ==
Following are notable players who will come back after retirements during the 2019 WTA Tour season:

- (France) Tatiana Golovin (born 25 January 1988 in Moscow, Russia) joined the professional tour in 2002 and reached a career-high ranking of no. 12 in singles and no. 91 in doubles. Golovin won two WTA singles titles and the 2004 French Open mixed doubles with compatriot Richard Gasquet. She also made quarterfinal of 2006 US Open in singles. Suffering from ankylosing spondylitis in 2008 season, she decided to walk away from the sport. Her last played tournament was the German Open in May 2008. She announced her comeback in September, 2019 and her first tournament back was Luxembourg Open in October after receiving a wildcard to compete in the qualifying draw.
- Patricia Maria Țig (born 27 July 1994 in Caransebeș, Romania) joined the professional tour in 2009 and reached a career-high ranking of no. 83 in singles and no. 155 in doubles. Țig reached 1 WTA singles final and 2 doubles finals during her career, losing all 3 of them. She also made first round appearances in all four majors. After a period of struggling with her performances in the second half of 2017 season, she decided to focus on her health, citing back pain as the main source of discomfort. Her last played tournament was the (Guangzhou Open) in September 2017. Țig became an inactive player on 24 September 2018 after not playing for 52 consecutive weeks. She announced her comeback to the tour after giving birth to a baby girl. Her first event was an W15 ITF Tournament in Cancún, Mexico, in April.

== See also ==
- 2019 ATP Tour
- 2019 WTA 125K series
- 2019 ITF Women's Circuit
