= 2019 Internationaux de Strasbourg =

- Date: 19 – 25 May
- Edition: 33rd
- Category: WTA International tournaments
- Draw: 32S / 16D
- Prize money: $250,000
- Surface: Clay
- Location: Strasbourg, France
- Venue: Tennis Club de Strasbourg

Champions

Singles
- (Ukraine) Dayana Yastremska

Doubles
- (Australia) Daria Gavrilova / (Australia) Ellen Perez
← 2018 ·	Internationaux de Strasbourg	· 2020 →

The 2019 Internationaux de Strasbourg was a professional tennis tournament played on clay courts. It was the 33rd edition of the tournament and part of the International-level tournament category of the 2019 WTA Tour. It took place at the Tennis Club de Strasbourg in Strasbourg, France, between 19 and 25 May 2019.

== Points and prize money ==
Event	W	F	SF	QF	Round of 16	Round of 32	Q	Q2	Q1
Women's singles	280	180	110	60	30	1	18	12	1
Women's doubles	280	180	110	60	1	—	—	—	—

=== Prize money ===
Event	W	F	SF	QF	Round of 16	Round of 32	Q2	Q1
Women's singles	$43,000	$21,400	$11,500	$6,175	$3,400	$2,100	$1,020	$600
Women's doubles	$12,300	$6,400	$3,435	$1,820	$960	—	—	—

== Singles main draw entrants ==
=== Seeds ===
Country	Player	Rank^{1}	Seed
~~AUS~~	~~Ashleigh Barty~~	~~9~~	~~1~~
BLR	Aryna Sabalenka	10	2
CHN	Wang Qiang	17	3
FRA	Caroline Garcia	22	4
USA	Sofia Kenin	37	5
UKR	Dayana Yastremska	41	6
CHN	Zheng Saisai	46	7
CHN	Zhang Shuai	48	8

- Rankings are as of May 13, 2019.

=== Other entrants ===
The following players received wildcards into the singles main draw:

- (France) Amandine Hesse
- (Belarus) Aryna Sabalenka
- (France) Harmony Tan

The following player received entry using a protected ranking into the main draw:

- (United States) Shelby Rogers

The following players received entry from the qualifying draw:

- (Belgium) Marie Benoît
- (China) Han Xinyun
- (Ukraine) Marta Kostyuk
- (Australia) Astra Sharma
- (Germany) Laura Siegemund
- (Mexico) Renata Zarazúa

The following player received entry as a lucky loser:

- (Latvia) Diāna Marcinkēviča

=== Withdrawals ===
- (Australia) Ashleigh Barty → replaced by (Latvia) Diāna Marcinkēviča
- (Romania) Mihaela Buzărnescu → replaced by (China) Zhu Lin
- (France) Alizé Cornet → replaced by (Poland) Magda Linette
- (Italy) Camila Giorgi → replaced by (Thailand) Luksika Kumkhum
- (Serbia) Aleksandra Krunić → replaced by (France) Fiona Ferro
- (Croatia) Petra Martić → replaced by (United States) Jessica Pegula
- (Russia) Anastasia Pavlyuchenkova → replaced by (United States) Shelby Rogers

== Doubles main draw entrants ==
=== Seeds ===
Country	Player	Country	Player	Rank^{1}	Seed
~~TPE~~	~~Chan Hao-ching~~	~~TPE~~	~~Latisha Chan~~	~~34~~	~~1~~
JPN	Eri Hozumi	JPN	Makoto Ninomiya	54	2
POL	Alicja Rosolska	CHN	Yang Zhaoxuan	56	3
CRO	Darija Jurak	ROU	Raluca Olaru	75	4
UKR	Nadiia Kichenok	USA	Abigail Spears	80	5

- ^{1} Rankings as of May 13, 2019.

=== Other entrants ===
The following pairs received a wildcard into the doubles main draw:

- (France) Fiona Ferro / (France) Diane Parry
- (France) Amandine Hesse / (France) Harmony Tan

The following pair received entry as alternates:

- (Australia) Daria Gavrilova / (Australia) Ellen Perez

=== Withdrawals ===
Before the tournament

- (Chinese Taipei) Chan Hao-ching / (Chinese Taipei) Latisha Chan (change of schedule)

== Finals ==
=== Singles ===
- (Ukraine) Dayana Yastremska def. (France) Caroline Garcia, 6–4, 5–7, 7–6^{(7–3)}

=== Doubles ===
- (Australia) Daria Gavrilova / (Australia) Ellen Perez def. (China) Duan Yingying / (China) Han Xinyun, 6–4, 6–3
