= 2019 Mallorca Open =

- Date: 17 – 23 June
- Edition: 4th
- Category: WTA International tournaments
- Draw: 32S / 16D
- Prize money: $250,000
- Surface: Grass
- Location: Santa Ponsa, Mallorca, Spain
- Venue: Santa Ponsa Tennis Club

Champions

Singles
- (United States) Sofia Kenin

Doubles
- (Belgium) Kirsten Flipkens / (Sweden) Johanna Larsson
- Mallorca Open

The 2019 Mallorca Open was a women's tennis tournament played on grass courts. It was the 4th edition of the Mallorca Open, and part of the International category of the 2019 WTA Tour. It took place at Santa Ponsa Tennis Club in Mallorca, Spain, from 17 June through 23 June 2019.

== Points and prize money ==
=== Point distribution ===
Event	W	F	SF	QF	Round of 16	Round of 32	Q	Q2	Q1
Singles	280	180	110	60	30	1	18	12	1
Doubles	280	180	110	60	1	—N/a	—N/a	—N/a	—N/a

=== Prize money ===
Event	W	F	SF	QF	Round of 16	Round of 32	Q2	Q1
Singles	€34,677	€17,258	€9,274	€4,980	€2,742	€1,694	€823	€884
Doubles	€9,919	€5,161	€2,770	€1,468	€774	—N/a	—N/a	—N/a

== WTA singles main draw entrants ==
=== Seeds ===
Country	Player	Rank^{1}	Seed
GER	Angelique Kerber	6	1
LAT	Anastasija Sevastova	12	2
SUI	Belinda Bencic	13	3
BEL	Elise Mertens	21	4
USA	Amanda Anisimova	26	5
FRA	Caroline Garcia	28	6
USA	Sofia Kenin	30	7
CZE	Kateřina Siniaková	38	8

- ^{1} Rankings are as of June 10, 2019.

=== Other entrants ===
The following players received wildcards into the main draw:

- (Spain) Paula Badosa
- (Germany) Andrea Petkovic
- (Russia) Maria Sharapova
- (Australia) Samantha Stosur

The following players received entry using a protected ranking into the main draw:

- (Germany) Anna-Lena Friedsam

The following players received entry from the qualifying draw:

- (Belgium) Ysaline Bonaventure
- (Slovenia) Kaja Juvan
- (United States) Varvara Lepchenko
- (Czech Republic) Tereza Martincová
- (United States) Shelby Rogers
- (Spain) Sara Sorribes Tormo

=== Retirements ===
- (Tunisia) Ons Jabeur (right shoulder injury)
- (United States) Shelby Rogers (right shoulder injury)

== WTA doubles main draw entrants ==
=== Seeds ===
Country	Player	Country	Player	Rank^{1}	Seed
BEL	Elise Mertens	CHN	Zhang Shuai	14	1
BEL	Kirsten Flipkens	SWE	Johanna Larsson	56	2
ESP	María José Martínez Sánchez	ESP	Sara Sorribes Tormo	98	3
JPN	Shuko Aoyama	SRB	Aleksandra Krunić	114	4

- ^{1} Rankings are as of 10 June 2019.

=== Other entrants ===
The following pairs received wildcards into the doubles main draw:

- (Germany) Mona Barthel / (Germany) Anna-Lena Friedsam
- (Spain) Aliona Bolsova / (China) Wang Yafan

== Champions ==
=== Singles ===
- (United States) Sofia Kenin def. (Switzerland) Belinda Bencic, 6–7^{(2–7)}, 7–6^{(7–5)}, 6–4

=== Doubles ===
- (Belgium) Kirsten Flipkens / (Sweden) Johanna Larsson def. (Spain) María José Martínez Sánchez / (Spain) Sara Sorribes Tormo, 6–2, 6–4
