= 2019 Grand Prix SAR La Princesse Lalla Meryem =

- Date: 29 April – 4 May
- Edition: 19th
- Category: WTA International
- Draw: 32S / 16D
- Prize money: $250,000
- Surface: Clay / outdoor
- Location: Rabat, Morocco
- Venue: Club des Cheminots

Champions

Singles
- (Greece) Maria Sakkari

Doubles
- (Spain) María José Martínez Sánchez / (Spain) Sara Sorribes Tormo
- Morocco Open

The 2019 Grand Prix SAR La Princesse Lalla Meryem was a women's professional tennis tournament played on clay courts. It was the 19th edition of the tournament and part of the WTA International tournaments category of the 2019 WTA Tour. It took place in Rabat, Morocco, between 29 April and 4 May 2019.

== Points and prize money ==
Event	W	F	SF	QF	Round of 16	Round of 32	Q	Q3	Q2	Q1
Singles	280	180	110	60	30	1	18	14	10	1
Doubles	280	180	110	60	1	—N/a	—N/a	—N/a	—N/a	—N/a

=== Prize money ===
Event	W	F	SF	QF	Round of 16	Round of 32	Q3	Q2	Q1
Singles	$43,000	$21,400	$11,300	$5,900	$3,310	$1,925	$1,005	$730	$530
Doubles	$12,300	$6,400	$3,435	$1,820	$960	—N/a	—N/a	—N/a	—N/a

== Singles main draw entrants ==
=== Seeds ===
Country	Player	Rank^{1}	Seed
BEL	Elise Mertens	18	1
TPE	Hsieh Su-wei	24	2
KAZ	Yulia Putintseva	38	3
AUS	Ajla Tomljanović	39	4
~~CRO~~	~~Petra Martić~~	~~40~~	~~5~~
GRE	Maria Sakkari	43	6
GBR	Johanna Konta	45	7
BEL	Alison Van Uytvanck	51	8

- Rankings are as of April 22, 2019.

=== Other entrants ===
The following players received wildcards into the singles main draw:

- (Switzerland) Timea Bacsinszky
- (Belgium) Elise Mertens
- (Bulgaria) Isabella Shinikova

The following players received entry from the qualifying draw:

- (Belgium) Ysaline Bonaventure
- (Serbia) Olga Danilović
- (France) Fiona Ferro
- (United States) Varvara Lepchenko

The following player received entry as a lucky loser:

- (Romania) Irina Bara

=== Withdrawals ===
- (Tunisia) Ons Jabeur → replaced by (Poland) Magda Linette
- (Russia) Veronika Kudermetova → replaced by (Romania) Ana Bogdan
- (Croatia) Petra Martić → replaced by (Romania) Irina Bara
- (China) Zheng Saisai → replaced by (Serbia) Ivana Jorović

== Doubles main draw entrants ==
=== Seeds ===
Country	Player	Country	Player	Rank^{1}	Seed
ESP	María José Martínez Sánchez	ESP	Sara Sorribes Tormo	97	1
RUS	Alexandra Panova	RUS	Vera Zvonareva	117	2
AUS	Monique Adamczak	AUS	Jessica Moore	119	3
CHI	Alexa Guarachi	USA	Sabrina Santamaria	148	4

- ^{1} Rankings as of April 22, 2019.

=== Other entrants ===
The following pairs received wildcards into the doubles main draw:

- (Romania) Ana Bogdan / (Bulgaria) Isabella Shinikova
- (Burundi) Sada Nahimana / (Morocco) Lina Qostal

=== Withdrawals ===
During the tournament

- (Serbia) Olga Danilović (right knee injury)

== Champions ==
=== Singles ===
- (Greece) Maria Sakkari def. (United Kingdom) Johanna Konta, 2–6, 6–4, 6–1

=== Doubles ===
- (Spain) María José Martínez Sánchez / (Spain) Sara Sorribes Tormo def. (Spain) Georgina García Pérez / (Georgia (country)) Oksana Kalashnikova, 7–5, 6–1
