= 2019 Grand Prix SAR La Princesse Lalla Meryem – Doubles =

Doubles
- 2019 Grand Prix SAR La Princesse Lalla Meryem

Final
- Champions: (Spain) María José Martínez Sánchez (Spain) Sara Sorribes Tormo
- Runners-up: (Spain) Georgina García Pérez (Georgia (country)) Oksana Kalashnikova
- Score: 7–5, 6–1

Events
Singles	Doubles
← 2018 ·	Grand Prix SAR La Princesse Lalla Meryem	· 2020 →

Anna Blinkova and Raluca Olaru were the defending champions, but chose not to participate this year.

María José Martínez Sánchez and Sara Sorribes Tormo won the title, defeating Georgina García Pérez and Oksana Kalashnikova in the final, 7–5, 6–1.

== Seeds ==
1. (Spain) María José Martínez Sánchez / (Spain) Sara Sorribes Tormo (champions)
2. (Russia) Alexandra Panova / (Russia) Vera Zvonareva (first round)
3. (Australia) Monique Adamczak / (Australia) Jessica Moore (first round)
4. (Chile) Alexa Guarachi / (United States) Sabrina Santamaria (semifinals)

== Draw ==
=== Key ===
- Q = Qualifier
- WC = Wild card
- LL = Lucky loser
- Alt = Alternate
- SE = Special exempt
- PR = Protected ranking
- ITF = ITF entry
- JE = Junior exempt
- w/o = Walkover
- r = Retired
- d = Defaulted
- SR = Special ranking

=== Draw ===
First round
1	(Spain) MJ Martínez Sánchez (Spain) S Sorribes Tormo	6	6
(Germany) V Heisen (Sweden) J Larsson	4	4
(Belgium) G Minnen (Belgium) A Van Uytvanck	6	6
WC	(Burundi) S Nahimana (Morocco) L Qostal	2	3
4	(Chile) A Guarachi (United States) S Santamaria	4	6	[10]
(Kazakhstan) A Danilina (Kazakhstan) G Voskoboeva	6	3	[8]
(Croatia) T Mrdeža (Australia) Ar Rodionova	6	6
(Brazil) L Pigossi (China) Y Wang	4	1
WC	(Romania) A Bogdan (Bulgaria) I Shinikova	7	6^{3}	[10]
(Switzerland) T Bacsinszky (Romania) A Mitu	5	7^{7}	[2]
(Serbia) O Danilović (Slovenia) T Zidanšek	6	6
3	(Australia) M Adamczak (Australia) J Moore	2	3
(Spain) G García Pérez (Georgia (country)) O Kalashnikova	6	6
(Netherlands) L Kerkhove (Netherlands) B Schoofs	2	2
(United Kingdom) H Dart (United Kingdom) J Konta	5	6	[10]
2	(Russia) A Panova (Russia) V Zvonareva	7	3	[5]

Quarterfinals
1	(Spain) MJ Martínez Sánchez (Spain) S Sorribes Tormo	6	7^{7}
(Belgium) G Minnen (Belgium) A Van Uytvanck	1	6^{2}
4	(Chile) A Guarachi (United States) S Santamaria	6	3	[10]
(Croatia) T Mrdeža (Australia) Ar Rodionova	3	6	[4]
WC	(Romania) A Bogdan (Bulgaria) I Shinikova	w/o
(Serbia) O Danilović (Slovenia) T Zidanšek
(Spain) G García Pérez (Georgia (country)) O Kalashnikova	6	6
(United Kingdom) H Dart (United Kingdom) J Konta	0	2

Semifinals
1	(Spain) MJ Martínez Sánchez (Spain) S Sorribes Tormo	6	6
4	(Chile) A Guarachi (United States) S Santamaria	3	1
WC	(Romania) A Bogdan (Bulgaria) I Shinikova	6^{3}	3
(Spain) G García Pérez (Georgia (country)) O Kalashnikova	7^{7}	6

Final
1	(Spain) MJ Martínez Sánchez (Spain) S Sorribes Tormo	7	6
(Spain) G García Pérez (Georgia (country)) O Kalashnikova	5	1
