= 2019 Internationaux de Strasbourg – Doubles =

Doubles
- 2019 Internationaux de Strasbourg

Final
- Champions: (Australia) Daria Gavrilova (Australia) Ellen Perez
- Runners-up: (China) Duan Yingying (China) Han Xinyun
- Score: 6–4, 6–3

Events
Singles	Doubles
← 2018 ·	Internationaux de Strasbourg	· 2020 →

Mihaela Buzărnescu and Raluca Olaru were the defending champions, but Buzărnescu chose not to participate this year. Olaru played alongside Darija Jurak, but lost in the semifinals to Daria Gavrilova and Ellen Perez.

Gavrilova and Perez went on to win the title, defeating Duan Yingying and Han Xinyun in the final, 6–4, 6–3.

== Seeds ==
1. (Chinese Taipei) Chan Hao-ching / (Chinese Taipei) Latisha Chan (withdrew)
2. (Japan) Eri Hozumi / (Japan) Makoto Ninomiya (quarterfinals)
3. (Poland) Alicja Rosolska / (China) Yang Zhaoxuan (first round)
4. (Croatia) Darija Jurak / (Romania) Raluca Olaru (semifinals)
5. (Ukraine) Nadiia Kichenok / (United States) Abigail Spears (quarterfinals)

== Draw ==
=== Key ===
- Q = Qualifier
- WC = Wild card
- LL = Lucky loser
- Alt = Alternate
- SE = Special exempt
- PR = Protected ranking
- ITF = ITF entry
- JE = Junior exempt
- w/o = Walkover
- r = Retired
- d = Defaulted
- SR = Special ranking

=== Draw ===
First round
5	(Ukraine) N Kichenok (United States) A Spears	6	6
(United States) S Kenin (Poland) M Linette	2	2
(China) Y Duan (China) X Han	6	7
(China) Y Wang (China) S Zheng	2	5
3	(Poland) A Rosolska (China) Z Yang	2	3
(Kazakhstan) G Voskoboeva (Ukraine) D Yastremska	6	6
(Germany) T Maria (France) P Parmentier	4	4
(Japan) M Kato (Australia) S Sanders	6	6
WC	(France) A Hesse (France) H Tan	6	6
(Mexico) G Olmos (United States) M Sanchez	4	4
(Georgia (country)) O Kalashnikova (Ukraine) L Kichenok	4	3
4	(Croatia) D Jurak (Romania) R Olaru	6	6
Alt	(Australia) D Gavrilova (Australia) E Perez	6	6
WC	(France) F Ferro (France) D Parry	4	3
(Australia) M Adamczak (Australia) J Moore	5	6	[6]
2	(Japan) E Hozumi (Japan) M Ninomiya	7	2	[10]

Quarterfinals
5	(Ukraine) N Kichenok (United States) A Spears	6	3	[8]
(China) Y Duan (China) X Han	2	6	[10]
(Kazakhstan) G Voskoboeva (Ukraine) D Yastremska	6	6
(Japan) M Kato (Australia) S Sanders	3	4
WC	(France) A Hesse (France) H Tan	4	4
4	(Croatia) D Jurak (Romania) R Olaru	6	6
Alt	(Australia) D Gavrilova (Australia) E Perez	7	6
2	(Japan) E Hozumi (Japan) M Ninomiya	5	4

Semifinals
(China) Y Duan (China) X Han	6	3	[10]
(Kazakhstan) G Voskoboeva (Ukraine) D Yastremska	2	6	[7]
4	(Croatia) D Jurak (Romania) R Olaru	6^{2}	3
Alt	(Australia) D Gavrilova (Australia) E Perez	7^{7}	6

Final
(China) Y Duan (China) X Han	4	3
Alt	(Australia) D Gavrilova (Australia) E Perez	6	6
