= 2019 Porsche Tennis Grand Prix – Doubles =

Doubles
- 2019 Porsche Tennis Grand Prix

Final
- Champions: (Germany) Mona Barthel (Germany) Anna-Lena Friedsam
- Runners-up: (Russia) Anastasia Pavlyuchenkova (Czech Republic) Lucie Šafářová
- Score: 2–6, 6–3, [10–6]

Details
- Draw: 16
- Seeds: 4

Events
Singles	Doubles
- Porsche Tennis Grand Prix

Raquel Atawo and Anna-Lena Grönefeld were the defending champions, but chose not to participate together this year. Atawo played alongside Katarina Srebotnik, but lost in the quarterfinals to Anastasia Pavlyuchenkova and Lucie Šafářová. Grönefeld teamed up with Demi Schuurs, but lost in the first round to Gabriela Dabrowski and Jeļena Ostapenko.

Mona Barthel and Anna-Lena Friedsam won the title, defeating Pavlyuchenkova and Šafářová in the final, 2–6, 6–3, [10–6].

== Seeds ==
1. (United States) Nicole Melichar / (Czech Republic) Květa Peschke (first round)
2. (Germany) Anna-Lena Grönefeld / (Netherlands) Demi Schuurs (first round)
3. (Japan) Makoto Ninomiya / (United States) Abigail Spears (first round)
4. (United States) Raquel Atawo / (Slovenia) Katarina Srebotnik (quarterfinals)

== Draw ==
Key

- Q = Qualifier
- WC = Wild card
- LL = Lucky loser
- Alt = Alternate
- ITF = ITF entry
- PR = Protected ranking
- SR = Special ranking
- SE = Special exempt
- JE = Junior exempt
- JR = Junior Accelerator Programme entrant
- CO = College Accelerator Programme entrant
- NG = Next Gen Accelerator Program entrant
- w/o = Walkover
- r = Retired
- d = Defaulted

=== Draw ===
First round
1	(United States) N Melichar (Czech Republic) K Peschke	7	5	[11]
(Croatia) D Jurak (Romania) R Olaru	5	7	[13]
(Japan) S Aoyama (Belarus) L Marozava	2	0
(Russia) A Blinkova (Georgia (country)) O Kalashnikova	6	6
4	(United States) R Atawo (Slovenia) K Srebotnik	6	6
(Slovenia) D Jakupović (Slovenia) A Klepač	4	4
WC	(Russia) A Pavlyuchenkova (Czech Republic) L Šafářová	7^{7}	6
(Ukraine) L Kichenok (Ukraine) N Kichenok	6^{5}	4
(United States) K Christian (Russia) V Zvonareva	3	1
WC	(Germany) M Barthel (Germany) A-L Friedsam	6	6
(Luxembourg) M Minella (Germany) A Petkovic	7^{7}	6
3	(Japan) M Ninomiya (United States) A Spears	6^{4}	3
(Spain) MJ Martínez Sánchez (Spain) S Sorribes Tormo	2	3
(Switzerland) B Bencic (Poland) A Rosolska	6	6
(Canada) G Dabrowski (Latvia) J Ostapenko	6	6
2	(Germany) A-L Grönefeld (Netherlands) D Schuurs	1	2

Quarterfinals
(Croatia) D Jurak (Romania) R Olaru	6	2	[8]
(Russia) A Blinkova (Georgia (country)) O Kalashnikova	3	6	[10]
4	(United States) R Atawo (Slovenia) K Srebotnik	0	2
WC	(Russia) A Pavlyuchenkova (Czech Republic) L Šafářová	6	6
WC	(Germany) M Barthel (Germany) A-L Friedsam	6	3	[10]
(Luxembourg) M Minella (Germany) A Petkovic	3	6	[6]
(Switzerland) B Bencic (Poland) A Rosolska	6	5	[9]
(Canada) G Dabrowski (Latvia) J Ostapenko	2	7	[11]

Semifinals
(Russia) A Blinkova (Georgia (country)) O Kalashnikova	4	5
WC	(Russia) A Pavlyuchenkova (Czech Republic) L Šafářová	6	7
WC	(Germany) M Barthel (Germany) A-L Friedsam	4	6	[11]
(Canada) G Dabrowski (Latvia) J Ostapenko	6	2	[9]

Final
WC	(Russia) A Pavlyuchenkova (Czech Republic) L Šafářová	6	3	[6]
WC	(Germany) M Barthel (Germany) A-L Friedsam	2	6	[10]
