= 2019 Mallorca Open – Doubles =

Doubles
- 2019 Mallorca Open

Final
- Champions: (Belgium) Kirsten Flipkens (Sweden) Johanna Larsson
- Runners-up: (Spain) María José Martínez Sánchez (Spain) Sara Sorribes Tormo
- Score: 6–2, 6–4

Details
- Draw: 16 (2WC)
- Seeds: 4

Events
Singles	Doubles
- Mallorca Open

Andreja Klepač and María José Martínez Sánchez were the defending champions, but Klepač chose not to participate this year.

Kirsten Flipkens and Johanna Larsson won the title, defeating Martínez Sánchez and Sara Sorribes Tormo in the final, 6–2, 6–4.

== Seeds ==
1. (Belgium) Elise Mertens / (China) Zhang Shuai (quarterfinals)
2. (Belgium) Kirsten Flipkens / (Sweden) Johanna Larsson (champions)
3. (Spain) María José Martínez Sánchez / (Spain) Sara Sorribes Tormo (final)
4. (Japan) Shuko Aoyama / (Serbia) Aleksandra Krunić (semifinals)

== Draw ==
Key

- Q = Qualifier
- WC = Wild card
- LL = Lucky loser
- Alt = Alternate
- ITF = ITF entry
- PR = Protected ranking
- SR = Special ranking
- SE = Special exempt
- JE = Junior exempt
- JR = Junior Accelerator Programme entrant
- CO = College Accelerator Programme entrant
- NG = Next Gen Accelerator Program entrant
- w/o = Walkover
- r = Retired
- d = Defaulted

=== Draw ===
First round
1	(Belgium) E Mertens (China) S Zhang	6	7^{7}
(Romania) I Bara (Romania) A Mitu	1	6^{4}
WC	(Germany) M Barthel (Germany) A-L Friedsam	4	4
(Switzerland) B Bencic (Slovakia) V Kužmová	6	6
3	(Spain) MJ Martínez Sánchez (Spain) S Sorribes Tormo	7^{7}	6
(China) X Han (Hungary) F Stollár	6^{5}	2
(Japan) M Ninomiya (Czech Republic) R Voráčová	2	6	[2]
(United States) D Krawczyk (Mexico) G Olmos	6	4	[10]
(Chile) A Guarachi (United States) S Santamaria	6	6
(Japan) M Kato (Switzerland) X Knoll	2	3
WC	(Spain) A Bolsova (China) Y Wang	2	6^{6}
4	(Japan) S Aoyama (Serbia) A Krunić	6	7^{8}
(Belarus) L Marozava (Australia) S Sanders	6	5	[7]
(Australia) M Adamczak (Georgia (country)) O Kalashnikova	4	7	[10]
(Puerto Rico) M Puig (Latvia) A Sevastova	3	2
2	(Belgium) K Flipkens (Sweden) J Larsson	6	6

Quarterfinals
1	(Belgium) E Mertens (China) S Zhang	0	2
(Switzerland) B Bencic (Slovakia) V Kužmová	6	6
3	(Spain) MJ Martínez Sánchez (Spain) S Sorribes Tormo	6	3	[11]
(United States) D Krawczyk (Mexico) G Olmos	1	6	[9]
(Chile) A Guarachi (United States) S Santamaria	4	1
4	(Japan) S Aoyama (Serbia) A Krunić	6	6
(Australia) M Adamczak (Georgia (country)) O Kalashnikova	4	3
2	(Belgium) K Flipkens (Sweden) J Larsson	6	6

Semifinals
(Switzerland) B Bencic (Slovakia) V Kužmová	4	2
3	(Spain) MJ Martínez Sánchez (Spain) S Sorribes Tormo	6	6
4	(Japan) S Aoyama (Serbia) A Krunić	3	6	[13]
2	(Belgium) K Flipkens (Sweden) J Larsson	6	2	[15]

Final
3	(Spain) MJ Martínez Sánchez (Spain) S Sorribes Tormo	2	4
2	(Belgium) K Flipkens (Sweden) J Larsson	6	6
