= 2019 Birmingham Classic =

- Date: 17–23 June
- Edition: 38th
- Category: WTA Premier
- Draw: 32S / 16D
- Prize money: $1,006,263
- Surface: Grass
- Location: Birmingham, United Kingdom
- Venue: Edgbaston Priory Club

Champions

Singles
- (Australia) Ashleigh Barty

Doubles
- (Chinese Taipei) Hsieh Su-wei / (Czech Republic) Barbora Strýcová
← 2018 ·	Birmingham Classic	· 2021 →

The 2019 Birmingham Classic (also known as the Nature Valley Classic for sponsorship reasons) was a women's tennis tournament played on outdoor grass courts. It was the 38th edition of the event, and a Premier tournament on the 2019 WTA Tour. It took place at the Edgbaston Priory Club in Birmingham, United Kingdom, on 17–23 June 2019.

== Points and prize money ==
=== Point distribution ===
Event	W	F	SF	QF	Round of 16	Round of 32^{1}	Q	Q3	Q2	Q1
Singles	470	305	185	100	55	1	25	18	13	1
Doubles	470	305	185	100	1	—	—	—	—	—

=== Prize money ===
Event	W	F	SF	QF	Round of 16	Round of 32	Q3	Q2	Q1
Singles	$163,085	$86,840	$46,345	$24,880	$13,311	$6,398	$3,791	$2,021	$1,122
Doubles *	$50,876	$27,155	$14,845	$7,562	$4,098	—	—	—	—

_{^{1}Qualifiers prize money is also the round of 32 prize money.}
_{*per team}

== Singles main draw entrants ==
=== Seeds ===
Country	Player	Rank^{1}	Seed
JPN	Naomi Osaka	1	1
AUS	Ashleigh Barty	2	2
CZE	Karolína Plíšková	3	3
UKR	Elina Svitolina	7	4
BLR	Aryna Sabalenka	10	5
CHN	Wang Qiang	15	6
GBR	Johanna Konta	18	7
GER	Julia Görges	19	8

- ^{1} Rankings as of June 10, 2019.

=== Other entrants ===
The following players received wildcards into the main draw:

- (United Kingdom) Harriet Dart
- (Czech Republic) Karolína Plíšková
- (United Kingdom) Heather Watson
- (United States) Venus Williams

The following players received entry from the qualifying draw:

- (United States) Lauren Davis
- (Czech Republic) Kristýna Plíšková
- (Poland) Iga Świątek
- (Bulgaria) Viktoriya Tomova

=== Withdrawals ===
Before the tournament

- (Canada) Bianca Andreescu → replaced by (Kazakhstan) Yulia Putintseva
- (United States) Danielle Collins → replaced by (United States) Jennifer Brady
- (Italy) Camila Giorgi → replaced by (Russia) Evgeniya Rodina
- (United States) Madison Keys → replaced by (Czech Republic) Barbora Strýcová
- (Czech Republic) Petra Kvitová → replaced by (Russia) Ekaterina Alexandrova
- (Spain) Garbiñe Muguruza → replaced by (United Kingdom) Johanna Konta
- (Russia) Anastasia Pavlyuchenkova → replaced by (Russia) Margarita Gasparyan
- (Spain) Carla Suárez Navarro → replaced by (France) Kristina Mladenovic

== Doubles main draw entrants ==
=== Seeds ===
Country	Player	Country	Player	Rank^{1}	Seed
CAN	Gabriela Dabrowski	CHN	Xu Yifan	20	1
TPE	Hsieh Su-wei	CZE	Barbora Strýcová	22	2
USA	Nicole Melichar	CZE	Květa Peschke	27	3
GER	Anna-Lena Grönefeld	NED	Demi Schuurs	34	4

- ^{1} Rankings as of June 10, 2019.

=== Other entrants ===
The following pair received a wildcard into the doubles main draw:

- (United Kingdom) Harriet Dart / (United States) Venus Williams
- (United Kingdom) Sarah Beth Grey / (United Kingdom) Eden Silva

=== Withdrawals ===
During the tournament

- (Australia) Ashleigh Barty (right arm injury)

=== Retirements ===
- (Ukraine) Lyudmyla Kichenok (right shoulder injury)

== Finals ==
=== Singles ===
- (Australia) Ashleigh Barty defeated (Germany) Julia Görges, 6–3, 7–5

=== Doubles ===
(Chinese Taipei) Hsieh Su-wei / (Czech Republic) Barbora Strýcová defeated (Germany) Anna-Lena Grönefeld / (Netherlands) Demi Schuurs, 6–4, 6–7^{(4–7)}, [10– 8]
