= 2022 Birmingham Classic =

- Date: 13–19 June
- Edition: 40th
- Category: WTA 250 tournaments
- Draw: 32S / 16D
- Surface: Grass
- Location: Birmingham, United Kingdom
- Venue: Edgbaston Priory Club

Champions

Singles
- (Brazil) Beatriz Haddad Maia

Doubles
- (Ukraine) Lyudmyla Kichenok / (Latvia) Jeļena Ostapenko
- Birmingham Classic

The 2022 Birmingham Classic (also known as the Rothesay Classic Birmingham for sponsorship reasons) was a women's tennis tournament being played on outdoor grass courts. It was the 40th edition of the event, and a WTA 250 tournament on the 2022 WTA Tour. It took place at the Edgbaston Priory Club in Birmingham, United Kingdom, on 13–19 June 2022.

== Champions ==
=== Singles ===
- (Brazil) Beatriz Haddad Maia def. (China) Zhang Shuai, 5–4, ret.

This is Haddad Maia's second title of the year and also her career.

=== Doubles ===
- (Ukraine) Lyudmyla Kichenok / (Latvia) Jeļena Ostapenko def. (Belgium) Elise Mertens / (China) Zhang Shuai, by walkover

== Points and prize money ==
=== Point distribution ===
Event	W	F	SF	QF	Round of 16	Round of 32^{1}	Q	Q2	Q1
Singles	280	180	110	60	30	1	18	12	1
Doubles	280	180	110	60	1	—N/a	—N/a	—N/a	—N/a

=== Prize money ===
Event	W	F	SF	QF	Round of 16	Round of 32	Q2	Q1
Singles	$29,800	$16,398	$10,100	$5,800	$3,675	$2,675	$1,950	$1,270
Doubles *	$10,300	$6,000	$3,800	$2,300	$1,750	—N/a	—N/a	—N/a

_{^{1}Qualifiers prize money is also the round of 32 prize money.}
_{*per team}

== Singles main draw entrants ==
=== Seeds ===
Country	Player	Rank^{1}	Seed
LAT	Jeļena Ostapenko	16	1
ROU	Simona Halep	20	2
ITA	Camila Giorgi	26	3
BEL	Elise Mertens	29	4
CZE	Petra Kvitová	31	5
ROU	Sorana Cîrstea	34	6
USA	Alison Riske	40	7
CHN	Zhang Shuai	41	8

- ^{1} Rankings are as of 6 June 2022.

=== Other entrants ===
The following players received wildcards into the main draw:

- (United Kingdom) Katie Boulter
- (United Kingdom) Harriet Dart
- (Czech Republic) Petra Kvitová

The following players received entry from the qualifying draw:

- (Croatia) Jana Fett
- (Canada) Rebecca Marino
- (United States) Caty McNally
- (Ukraine) Lesia Tsurenko
- (United States) CoCo Vandeweghe
- (Croatia) Donna Vekić

The following player received entry as a lucky loser:

- (Serbia) Aleksandra Krunić

=== Withdrawal ===
Before the tournament

- (Kazakhstan) Yulia Putintseva → replaced by (Slovenia) Kaja Juvan
- (United Kingdom) Emma Raducanu → replaced by (Ukraine) Dayana Yastremska
- (Egypt) Mayar Sherif → replaced by (Switzerland) Viktorija Golubic
- (Spain) Sara Sorribes Tormo → replaced by (Croatia) Petra Martić
- (United States) Sloane Stephens → replaced by (France) Caroline Garcia
- (Denmark) Clara Tauson → replaced by (Poland) Magdalena Fręch
- (Australia) Ajla Tomljanović → replaced by (Serbia) Aleksandra Krunić

== Doubles main draw entrants ==
=== Seeds ===
Country	Player	Country	Player	Rank^{1}	Seed
BEL	Elise Mertens	CHN	Zhang Shuai	5	1
UKR	Lyudmyla Kichenok	LAT	Jeļena Ostapenko	41	2
CZE	Lucie Hradecká	IND	Sania Mirza	41	3
JPN	Shuko Aoyama	TPE	Chan Hao-ching	63	4

- ^{1} Rankings are as of 6 June 2022.

=== Other entrants ===
The following pair received a wildcard into the doubles main draw:

- (United Kingdom) Harriet Dart / (United Kingdom) Sarah Beth Grey

=== Withdrawals ===
Before the tournament

- (Kazakhstan) Anna Danilina / (Brazil) Beatriz Haddad Maia → replaced by (United Kingdom) Alicia Barnett / (United Kingdom) Olivia Nicholls
- (Poland) Katarzyna Piter / (Belgium) Kimberley Zimmermann → replaced by (Poland) Katarzyna Kawa / (Poland) Katarzyna Piter
