= 2021 Birmingham Classic – Doubles =

Doubles
- 2021 Birmingham Classic

Final
- Champions: (Czech Republic) Marie Bouzková (Czech Republic) Lucie Hradecká
- Runners-up: (Tunisia) Ons Jabeur (Australia) Ellen Perez
- Score: 6–4, 2–6, [10–8]

Events
Singles	Doubles
← 2019 ·	Birmingham Classic	· 2022 →

Marie Bouzková and Lucie Hradecká defeated Ons Jabeur and Ellen Perez in the final, 6–4, 2–6, [10–8], to win the doubles title at the 2021 Birmingham Classic. This was Hradecká's 25th career WTA Tour doubles title and Bouzková's first career title overall.

Hsieh Su-wei and Barbora Strýcová were the defending champions from when the tournament was last held in 2019. Because Strýcová retired from professional tennis in May 2021, Hsieh played alongside Elise Mertens, but lost in the semifinals to Jabeur and Perez.

== Seeds ==
1. (Chinese Taipei) Hsieh Su-wei / (Belgium) Elise Mertens (semifinals)
2. (Chinese Taipei) Chan Hao-ching / (Chinese Taipei) Latisha Chan (quarterfinals)
3. (Canada) Gabriela Dabrowski / (China) Zhang Shuai (first round)
4. (United States) Caroline Dolehide / (United States) Caty McNally (first round)

== Draw ==
=== Key ===
- Q = Qualifier
- WC = Wild card
- LL = Lucky loser
- Alt = Alternate
- SE = Special exempt
- PR = Protected ranking
- ITF = ITF entry
- JE = Junior exempt
- w/o = Walkover
- r = Retired
- d = Defaulted
- SR = Special ranking

=== Draw ===
First round
1	(Chinese Taipei) S-w Hsieh (Belgium) E Mertens	6	6
(Australia) S Stosur (United States) C Vandeweghe	4	4
(United Kingdom) H Dart (United Kingdom) H Watson	6	3	[5]
WC	(United Kingdom) N Bains (Czech Republic) T Martincová	4	6	[10]
4	(United States) C Dolehide (United States) C McNally	4	6^{5}
(Tunisia) O Jabeur (Australia) E Perez	6	7^{7}
(United Kingdom) T Moore (United Kingdom) E Silva	0	6	[10]
(Slovenia) P Hercog (United States) A Riske	6	1	[6]
(France) E Lechemia (United States) I Neel	6	6
WC	(United Kingdom) SB Grey (United Kingdom) E Webley-Smith	3	2
(Ukraine) L Kichenok (Japan) M Ninomiya	6	2	[10]
3	(Canada) G Dabrowski (China) S Zhang	4	6	[7]
(Latvia) J Ostapenko (Poland) A Rosolska	2	3
(Czech Republic) M Bouzková (Czech Republic) L Hradecká	6	6
(Germany) J Wachaczyk (China) Y Wang	5	2
2	(Chinese Taipei) H-c Chan (Chinese Taipei) L Chan	7	6

Quarterfinals
1	(Chinese Taipei) S-w Hsieh (Belgium) E Mertens	6	6
WC	(United Kingdom) N Bains (Czech Republic) T Martincová	2	4
(Tunisia) O Jabeur (Australia) E Perez	5	6	[10]
(United Kingdom) T Moore (United Kingdom) E Silva	7	2	[5]
(France) E Lechemia (United States) I Neel	1	3
(Ukraine) L Kichenok (Japan) M Ninomiya	6	6
(Czech Republic) M Bouzková (Czech Republic) L Hradecká	3	7	[10]
2	(Chinese Taipei) H-c Chan (Chinese Taipei) L Chan	6	5	[5]

Semifinals
1	(Chinese Taipei) S-w Hsieh (Belgium) E Mertens	6	5	[3]
(Tunisia) O Jabeur (Australia) E Perez	3	7	[10]
(Ukraine) L Kichenok (Japan) M Ninomiya	5	3
(Czech Republic) M Bouzková (Czech Republic) L Hradecká	7	6

Final
(Tunisia) O Jabeur (Australia) E Perez	4	6	[8]
(Czech Republic) M Bouzková (Czech Republic) L Hradecká	6	2	[10]
