= 2019 WTA Premier tournaments =

The 2019 WTA Premier tournaments are 21 of the tennis tournaments on the 2019 WTA Tour. The WTA Tour is the elite tour for women's professional tennis. The WTA Premier tournaments rank below the Grand Slam events and above the WTA International tournaments. They are divided into three levels: Premier Mandatory (Indian Wells, Miami, Madrid and Beijing), Premier 5 (Dubai, Rome, Canada, Cincinnati and Wuhan), and Premier (12 tournaments in Europe, United States and Australia).

== Schedule ==
=== Premier ===
Week of	Tournament	Champions	Runners-up	Semifinalists	Quarterfinalists
31 December	Brisbane International; Brisbane, Australia	(Czech Republic) Karolína Plíšková; 4–6, 7–5, 6–2	(Ukraine) Lesia Tsurenko	(Croatia) Donna Vekić (Japan) Naomi Osaka	(Belarus) Aliaksandra Sasnovich (Australia) Ajla Tomljanović (Estonia) Anett Kontaveit (Latvia) Anastasija Sevastova
31 December	Brisbane International; Brisbane, Australia	(United States) Nicole Melichar (Czech Republic) Květa Peschke; 6–1, 6–1	(Chinese Taipei) Chan Hao-ching (Chinese Taipei) Latisha Chan	(Croatia) Donna Vekić (Japan) Naomi Osaka	(Belarus) Aliaksandra Sasnovich (Australia) Ajla Tomljanović (Estonia) Anett Kontaveit (Latvia) Anastasija Sevastova
7 January	Sydney International; Sydney, Australia	(Czech Republic) Petra Kvitová; 1–6, 7–5, 7–6^{(7–3)}	(Australia) Ashleigh Barty	(Netherlands) Kiki Bertens (Belarus) Aliaksandra Sasnovich	(Belgium) Elise Mertens (Kazakhstan) Yulia Putintseva (Switzerland) Timea Bacsinszky (Germany) Angelique Kerber
7 January	Sydney International; Sydney, Australia	(Serbia) Aleksandra Krunić (Czech Republic) Kateřina Siniaková; 6–1, 7–6^{(7–3)}	(Japan) Eri Hozumi (Poland) Alicja Rosolska	(Netherlands) Kiki Bertens (Belarus) Aliaksandra Sasnovich	(Belgium) Elise Mertens (Kazakhstan) Yulia Putintseva (Switzerland) Timea Bacsinszky (Germany) Angelique Kerber
28 January	St. Petersburg Ladies' Trophy; St. Petersburg, Russia	(Netherlands) Kiki Bertens; 7–6^{(7–2)}, 6–4	(Croatia) Donna Vekić	(Russia) Vera Zvonareva (Belarus) Aryna Sabalenka	(Czech Republic) Petra Kvitová (Russia) Daria Kasatkina (Russia) Ekaterina Alexandrova (Russia) Anastasia Pavlyuchenkova
28 January	St. Petersburg Ladies' Trophy; St. Petersburg, Russia	(Russia) Margarita Gasparyan (Russia) Ekaterina Makarova; 7–5, 7–5	(Russia) Anna Kalinskaya (Slovakia) Viktória Kužmová	(Russia) Vera Zvonareva (Belarus) Aryna Sabalenka	(Czech Republic) Petra Kvitová (Russia) Daria Kasatkina (Russia) Ekaterina Alexandrova (Russia) Anastasia Pavlyuchenkova
11 February	Qatar Total Open; Doha, Qatar	(Belgium) Elise Mertens; 3–6, 6–4, 6–3	(Romania) Simona Halep	(Ukraine) Elina Svitolina (Germany) Angelique Kerber	(Germany) Julia Görges (Czech Republic) Karolína Muchová (Czech Republic) Barbora Strýcová (Netherlands) Kiki Bertens
11 February	Qatar Total Open; Doha, Qatar	(Chinese Taipei) Chan Hao-ching (Chinese Taipei) Latisha Chan; 6–1, 3–6, [10–6]	(Germany) Anna-Lena Grönefeld (Netherlands) Demi Schuurs	(Ukraine) Elina Svitolina (Germany) Angelique Kerber	(Germany) Julia Görges (Czech Republic) Karolína Muchová (Czech Republic) Barbora Strýcová (Netherlands) Kiki Bertens
1 April	Volvo Car Open; Charleston, USA	(United States) Madison Keys; 7–6^{(7–5)}, 6–3	(Denmark) Caroline Wozniacki	(Puerto Rico) Monica Puig (Croatia) Petra Martić	(United States) Sloane Stephens (United States) Danielle Collins (Switzerland) Belinda Bencic (Greece) Maria Sakkari
1 April	Volvo Car Open; Charleston, USA	(Germany) Anna-Lena Grönefeld (Poland) Alicja Rosolska; 7–6^{(9–7)}, 6–2	(Russia) Irina Khromacheva (Russia) Veronika Kudermetova	(Puerto Rico) Monica Puig (Croatia) Petra Martić	(United States) Sloane Stephens (United States) Danielle Collins (Switzerland) Belinda Bencic (Greece) Maria Sakkari
22 April	Porsche Tennis Grand Prix; Stuttgart, Germany	(Czech Republic) Petra Kvitová; 6–3, 7–6^{(7–2)}	(Estonia) Anett Kontaveit	(Japan) Naomi Osaka (Netherlands) Kiki Bertens	(Croatia) Donna Vekić (Belarus) Victoria Azarenka (Latvia) Anastasija Sevastova (Germany) Angelique Kerber
22 April	Porsche Tennis Grand Prix; Stuttgart, Germany	(Germany) Mona Barthel (Germany) Anna-Lena Friedsam; 2–6, 6–3, [10–6]	(Russia) Anastasia Pavlyuchenkova (Czech Republic) Lucie Šafářová	(Japan) Naomi Osaka (Netherlands) Kiki Bertens	(Croatia) Donna Vekić (Belarus) Victoria Azarenka (Latvia) Anastasija Sevastova (Germany) Angelique Kerber
17 June	Birmingham Classic; Birmingham, UK	(Australia) Ashleigh Barty; 6–3, 7–5	(Germany) Julia Görges	(Croatia) Petra Martić (Czech Republic) Barbora Strýcová	(Kazakhstan) Yulia Putintseva (Latvia) Jeļena Ostapenko (Czech Republic) Kristýna Plíšková (United States) Venus Williams
17 June	Birmingham Classic; Birmingham, UK	(Chinese Taipei) Hsieh Su-wei (Czech Republic) Barbora Strýcová; 6–4, 6–7^{(4–7)}, [10–8]	(Germany) Anna-Lena Grönefeld (Netherlands) Demi Schuurs	(Croatia) Petra Martić (Czech Republic) Barbora Strýcová	(Kazakhstan) Yulia Putintseva (Latvia) Jeļena Ostapenko (Czech Republic) Kristýna Plíšková (United States) Venus Williams
24 June	Eastbourne International; Eastbourne, UK	(Czech Republic) Karolína Plíšková; 6–1, 6–4	(Germany) Angelique Kerber	(Tunisia) Ons Jabeur (Netherlands) Kiki Bertens	(France) Alizé Cornet (Romania) Simona Halep (Belarus) Aryna Sabalenka (Russia) Ekaterina Alexandrova
24 June	Eastbourne International; Eastbourne, UK	(Chinese Taipei) Chan Hao-ching (Chinese Taipei) Latisha Chan; 2–6, 6–3, [10–6]	(Belgium) Kirsten Flipkens (United States) Bethanie Mattek-Sands	(Tunisia) Ons Jabeur (Netherlands) Kiki Bertens	(France) Alizé Cornet (Romania) Simona Halep (Belarus) Aryna Sabalenka (Russia) Ekaterina Alexandrova
29 July	Silicon Valley Classic; San Jose, USA	(China) Zheng Saisai; 6–3, 7–6^{(7–3)}	(Belarus) Aryna Sabalenka	(Greece) Maria Sakkari (Croatia) Donna Vekić	(Ukraine) Elina Svitolina (United States) Amanda Anisimova (United States) Kristie Ahn (Spain) Carla Suárez Navarro
29 July	Silicon Valley Classic; San Jose, USA	(United States) Nicole Melichar (Czech Republic) Květa Peschke; 6–4, 6–4	(Japan) Shuko Aoyama (Japan) Ena Shibahara	(Greece) Maria Sakkari (Croatia) Donna Vekić	(Ukraine) Elina Svitolina (United States) Amanda Anisimova (United States) Kristie Ahn (Spain) Carla Suárez Navarro
9 September	Zhengzhou Open; Zhengzhou, China	(Czech Republic) Karolína Plíšková; 6–3, 6–2	(Croatia) Petra Martić	(Australia) Ajla Tomljanović (France) Kristina Mladenovic	(United States) Sofia Kenin (China) Zheng Saisai (Belarus) Aryna Sabalenka (Ukraine) Elina Svitolina
9 September	Zhengzhou Open; Zhengzhou, China	(United States) Nicole Melichar (Czech Republic) Květa Peschke; 6–1, 7–6^{(7–2)}	(Belgium) Yanina Wickmayer (Slovenia) Tamara Zidanšek	(Australia) Ajla Tomljanović (France) Kristina Mladenovic	(United States) Sofia Kenin (China) Zheng Saisai (Belarus) Aryna Sabalenka (Ukraine) Elina Svitolina
16 September	Toray Pan Pacific Open; Tokyo, Japan	(Japan) Naomi Osaka; 6–2, 6–3	(Russia) Anastasia Pavlyuchenkova	(Belgium) Elise Mertens (Germany) Angelique Kerber	(Kazakhstan) Yulia Putintseva (Italy) Camila Giorgi (United States) Madison Keys (Japan) Misaki Doi
16 September	Toray Pan Pacific Open; Tokyo, Japan	(Chinese Taipei) Chan Hao-ching (Chinese Taipei) Latisha Chan; 7–5, 7–5	(Chinese Taipei) Hsieh Su-wei (Chinese Taipei) Hsieh Yu-chieh	(Belgium) Elise Mertens (Germany) Angelique Kerber	(Kazakhstan) Yulia Putintseva (Italy) Camila Giorgi (United States) Madison Keys (Japan) Misaki Doi
14 October	Kremlin Cup; Moscow, Russia	(Switzerland) Belinda Bencic; 3–6, 6–1, 6–1	(Russia) Anastasia Pavlyuchenkova	(Czech Republic) Karolína Muchová (France) Kristina Mladenovic	(Russia) Veronika Kudermetova (Russia) Ekaterina Alexandrova (Belgium) Kirsten Flipkens (Netherlands) Kiki Bertens
14 October	Kremlin Cup; Moscow, Russia	(Japan) Shuko Aoyama (Japan) Ena Shibahara; 6–2, 6–1	(Belgium) Kirsten Flipkens (United States) Bethanie Mattek-Sands	(Czech Republic) Karolína Muchová (France) Kristina Mladenovic	(Russia) Veronika Kudermetova (Russia) Ekaterina Alexandrova (Belgium) Kirsten Flipkens (Netherlands) Kiki Bertens
