= 2019 Birmingham Classic – Singles =

Singles
- 2019 Birmingham Classic

Final
- Champion: (Australia) Ashleigh Barty
- Runner-up: (Germany) Julia Görges
- Score: 6–3, 7–5

Details
- Draw: 32 (4 Q / 4 WC )
- Seeds: 8

Events
Singles	Doubles
← 2018 ·	Birmingham Classic	· 2021 →

Petra Kvitová was the two-time defending champion, but withdrew with an arm injury before the tournament began.

Ashleigh Barty won the title without dropping a set, defeating Julia Görges in the final 6–3, 7–5. As a result of winning the title, Barty attained the WTA no. 1 singles ranking for the first time, displacing Naomi Osaka at the No. 1 position.

The second round match between Karolína and Kristýna Plíšková was the first match between identical twins in WTA Tour history.

== Seeds ==
1. (Japan) Naomi Osaka (second round)
2. (Australia) Ashleigh Barty (champion)
3. (Czech Republic) Karolína Plíšková (second round)
4. (Ukraine) Elina Svitolina (first round)
5. (Belarus) Aryna Sabalenka (first round)
6. (China) Wang Qiang (second round)
7. (United Kingdom) Johanna Konta (second round)
8. (Germany) Julia Görges (final)

== Draw ==
=== Key ===
- Q = Qualifier
- WC = Wild card
- LL = Lucky loser
- Alt = Alternate
- SE = Special exempt
- PR = Protected ranking
- ITF = ITF entry
- JE = Junior exempt
- w/o = Walkover
- r = Retired
- d = Defaulted
- SR = Special ranking

=== Finals ===
Semifinals
8	(Germany) Julia Görges	6	6
(Croatia) Petra Martić	4	3
(Czech Republic) Barbora Strýcová	4	4
2	(Australia) Ashleigh Barty	6	6

Final
8	(Germany) Julia Görges	3	5
2	(Australia) Ashleigh Barty	6	7

=== Top half ===
First round
1	(Japan) N Osaka	6	4	6
(Greece) M Sakkari	1	6	3
WC	(United Kingdom) H Dart	1	4
(Kazakhstan) Y Putintseva	6	6
(France) K Mladenovic	2	6	4
(Russia) E Rodina	6	2	6
(Ukraine) D Yastremska	6	4	3
8	(Germany) J Görges	3	6	6
4	(Ukraine) E Svitolina	3	6	4
(Russia) M Gasparyan	6	3	6
(Russia) E Alexandrova	3	5
(Croatia) P Martić	6	7
(Latvia) J Ostapenko	6	6
Q	(Poland) I Świątek	0	2
(Estonia) A Kontaveit	4	2
7	(United Kingdom) J Konta	6	6

Second round
1	(Japan) N Osaka	2	3
(Kazakhstan) Y Putintseva	6	6
(Russia) E Rodina	4	3
8	(Germany) J Görges	6	6
(Russia) M Gasparyan	3	6^{4}
(Croatia) P Martić	6	7^{7}
(Latvia) J Ostapenko	6	6
7	(United Kingdom) J Konta	3	4

Quarterfinals
(Kazakhstan) Y Putintseva	3	2
8	(Germany) J Görges	6	6
(Croatia) P Martić	6^{4}	7	6
(Latvia) J Ostapenko	7^{7}	5	1

Semifinals
8	(Germany) J Görges	6	6
(Croatia) P Martić	4	3

=== Bottom half ===
First round
5	(Belarus) A Sabalenka	3	6	6^{1}
(Chinese Taipei) S-w Hsieh	6	2	7^{7}
WC	(United Kingdom) H Watson	6	3	4
(Czech Republic) B Strýcová	3	6	6
Q	(Czech Republic) Kr Plíšková	6	6
Q	(Bulgaria) V Tomova	3	4
(Romania) M Buzărnescu	3	4
3/WC	(Czech Republic) Ka Plíšková	6	6
6	(China) Q Wang	6	6
Q	(United States) L Davis	3	2
WC	(United States) V Williams	6	6
(Belarus) A Sasnovich	3	4
(United States) J Brady	6	6
(Ukraine) L Tsurenko	3	3
(Croatia) D Vekić	3	4
2	(Australia) A Barty	6	6

Second round
(Chinese Taipei) S-w Hsieh	6^{3}	3
(Czech Republic) B Strýcová	7^{7}	6
Q	(Czech Republic) Kr Plíšková	6	3	7^{9}
3/WC	(Czech Republic) Ka Plíšková	2	6	6^{7}
6	(China) Q Wang	3	2
WC	(United States) V Williams	6	6
(United States) J Brady	3	1
2	(Australia) A Barty	6	6

Quarterfinals
(Czech Republic) B Strýcová	6	6
Q	(Czech Republic) Kr Plíšková	2	4
WC	(United States) V Williams	4	3
2	(Australia) A Barty	6	6

Semifinals
(Czech Republic) B Strýcová	4	4
2	(Australia) A Barty	6	6

== Qualifying ==
=== Seeds ===
1. (Poland) Iga Świątek (qualified)
2. (Russia) Anastasia Potapova (first round)
3. (United States) Jessica Pegula (second round)
4. (Australia) Astra Sharma (qualifying competition)
5. (United States) Bernarda Pera (qualifying competition)
6. (United States) Lauren Davis (qualified)
7. (Kazakhstan) Zarina Diyas (withdrew, still competing in Manchester)
8. (Japan) Misaki Doi (first round)

=== Qualifiers ===
1. (Poland) Iga Świątek
2. (Bulgaria) Viktoriya Tomova
3. (Czech Republic) Kristýna Plíšková
4. (United States) Lauren Davis

=== Draw ===
==== First qualifier ====
First round
1	(Poland) Iga Świątek	6	6
(Italy) Martina Trevisan	3	4
Alt	(Australia) Destanee Aiava	6	6
WC	(United Kingdom) Freya Christie	2	3
(France) Jessika Ponchet	3	1
(Poland) Magdalena Fręch	6	6
WC	(United Kingdom) Eden Silva	4	3
5	(United States) Bernarda Pera	6	6

Second round
1	(Poland) Iga Świątek	6^{5}	6	6
Alt	(Australia) Destanee Aiava	7^{7}	3	3
(Poland) Magdalena Fręch	5	6	5
5	(United States) Bernarda Pera	7	3	7

Qualifying competition
1	(Poland) Iga Świątek	2	7^{8}	6
5	(United States) Bernarda Pera	6	6^{6}	4

==== Second qualifier ====
First round
2	(Russia) Anastasia Potapova	5	2
Alt	(Canada) Gabriela Dabrowski	7	6
(Slovenia) Dalila Jakupović	6^{3}	1
(Russia) Anna Kalinskaya	7^{7}	6
(United States) Caty McNally	6	2	6
WC	(United Kingdom) Tara Moore	2	6	2
(Bulgaria) Viktoriya Tomova	7	2	6
8	(Japan) Misaki Doi	5	6	3

Second round
Alt	(Canada) Gabriela Dabrowski	6	2	4
(Russia) Anna Kalinskaya	3	6	6
(United States) Caty McNally	4	6^{3}
(Bulgaria) Viktoriya Tomova	6	7^{7}

Qualifying competition
(Russia) Anna Kalinskaya	4	2
(Bulgaria) Viktoriya Tomova	6	6

==== Third qualifier ====
First round
3	(United States) Jessica Pegula	6	6
(India) Ankita Raina	1	0
(Czech Republic) Kristýna Plíšková	6	7
(Russia) Sofya Zhuk	1	5
(Russia) Liudmila Samsonova	6	6
(Georgia (country)) Mariam Bolkvadze	4	3
(Czech Republic) Marie Bouzková	6	6^{3}	6
Alt	(Australia) Lizette Cabrera	3	7^{7}	2

Second round
3	(United States) Jessica Pegula	3	4
(Czech Republic) Kristýna Plíšková	6	6
(Russia) Liudmila Samsonova	3	1
(Czech Republic) Marie Bouzková	6	6

Qualifying competition
(Czech Republic) Kristýna Plíšková	4	6	6
(Czech Republic) Marie Bouzková	6	4	2

==== Fourth qualifier ====
First round
4	(Australia) Astra Sharma	7	6
WC	(United Kingdom) Sarah Beth Grey	5	1
(Germany) Tamara Korpatsch	1	2
(United States) Danielle Lao	6	6
Alt	(United Kingdom) Naiktha Bains	6	3	7^{10}
(United States) Claire Liu	1	6	6^{8}
Alt	(Japan) Mayo Hibi	6	6^{3}	1
6	(United States) Lauren Davis	4	7^{7}	6

Second round
4	(Australia) Astra Sharma	6	6^{5}	6
(United States) Danielle Lao	3	7^{7}	1
Alt	(United Kingdom) Naiktha Bains	3	2
6	(United States) Lauren Davis	6	6

Qualifying competition
4	(Australia) Astra Sharma	2	1
6	(United States) Lauren Davis	6	6
