= 2022 Birmingham Classic – Singles =

Singles
- 2022 Birmingham Classic

Final
- Champion: (Brazil) Beatriz Haddad Maia
- Runner-up: (China) Zhang Shuai
- Score: 5–4, ret.

Details
- Draw: 32 (6 Q / 3 WC )
- Seeds: 8

Events
Singles	Doubles
← 2021 ·	Birmingham Classic	· 2023 →

Beatriz Haddad Maia won the women's singles title at the 2022 Birmingham Classic, after Zhang Shuai retired from the final with the scoreline at 5–4 due to a neck injury. By winning the title, Haddad Maia extended her winning streak to 10 consecutive matches.

Ons Jabeur was the defending champion, but she chose to play in Berlin instead.

== Seeds ==
1. (Latvia) Jeļena Ostapenko (second round)
2. (Romania) Simona Halep (semifinals)
3. (Italy) Camila Giorgi (quarterfinals)
4. (Belgium) Elise Mertens (first round)
5. (Czech Republic) Petra Kvitová (first round)
6. (Romania) Sorana Cîrstea (semifinals)
7. (United States) Alison Riske (first round)
8. (China) Zhang Shuai (final, retired)

== Draw ==
=== Key ===
- Q = Qualifier
- WC = Wild card
- LL = Lucky loser
- Alt = Alternate
- SE = Special exempt
- PR = Protected ranking
- ITF = ITF entry
- JE = Junior exempt
- w/o = Walkover
- r = Retired
- d = Defaulted
- SR = Special ranking

=== Finals ===
Semifinals
8	(China) Zhang Shuai	4	6	7^{7}
6	(Romania) Sorana Cîrstea	6	1	6^{5}
(Brazil) Beatriz Haddad Maia	6	2	6
2	(Romania) Simona Halep	3	6	4

Final
8	(China) Zhang Shuai	4^{r}
(Brazil) Beatriz Haddad Maia	5

=== Top half ===
First round
1	(Latvia) J Ostapenko	6	5	6
Q	(Canada) R Marino	2	7	3
(Ukraine) D Yastremska	6	6
(Poland) M Linette	4	3
(Romania) E-G Ruse	7^{8}	7^{14}
(China) Q Wang	6^{6}	6^{12}
Q	(Croatia) J Fett	7	3	3
8	(China) S Zhang	5	6	6
4	(Belgium) E Mertens	6	4	5
Q	(United States) C McNally	3	6	7
Q	(United States) C Vandeweghe	4	4
Q	(Croatia) D Vekić	6	6
LL	(Serbia) A Krunić	6	7^{8}
(Croatia) P Martić	4	6^{6}
(United States) S Rogers	3	6	1
6	(Romania) S Cîrstea	6	4	6

Second round
1	(Latvia) J Ostapenko	6	5	5
(Ukraine) D Yastremska	3	7	7
(Romania) E-G Ruse	2	6	5
8	(China) S Zhang	6	2	7
Q	(United States) C McNally	5	3
Q	(Croatia) D Vekić	7	6
LL	(Serbia) A Krunić	1	1
6	(Romania) S Cîrstea	6	6

Quarterfinals
(Ukraine) D Yastremska	5	4
8	(China) S Zhang	7	6
Q	(Croatia) D Vekić	7	3	4
6	(Romania) S Cîrstea	5	6	6

Semifinals
8	(China) S Zhang	4	6	7^{7}
6	(Romania) S Cîrstea	6	1	6^{5}

=== Bottom half ===
First round
5/WC	(Czech Republic) P Kvitová	6^{4}	2
(Brazil) B Haddad Maia	7^{7}	6
(Spain) N Párrizas Díaz	7^{7}	3	3
(Poland) M Fręch	6^{4}	6	6
(United States) L Davis	7^{7}	7^{7}
(Slovenia) K Juvan	6^{2}	6^{5}
(Czech Republic) T Martincová	6^{7}	4
3	(Italy) C Giorgi	7^{9}	6
7	(United States) A Riske	4	3
WC	(United Kingdom) K Boulter	6	6
(France) C Garcia	6^{5}	6	7^{8}
(Switzerland) V Golubic	7^{7}	4	6^{6}
WC	(United Kingdom) H Dart	6	6
(Colombia) C Osorio	2	0
Q	(Ukraine) L Tsurenko	1	4
2	(Romania) S Halep	6	6

Second round
(Brazil) B Haddad Maia	6	5	7^{7}
(Poland) M Fręch	1	7	6^{3}
(United States) L Davis	6	5	2
3	(Italy) C Giorgi	3	7	6
WC	(United Kingdom) K Boulter	7^{7}	6
(France) C Garcia	6^{5}	1
WC	(United Kingdom) H Dart	3	2
2	(Romania) S Halep	6	6

Quarterfinals
(Brazil) B Haddad Maia	6	6
3	(Italy) C Giorgi	3	2
WC	(United Kingdom) K Boulter	4	1
2	(Romania) S Halep	6	6

Semifinals
(Brazil) B Haddad Maia	6	2	6
2	(Romania) S Halep	3	6	4

== Qualifying ==
=== Seeds ===
1. (Croatia) Donna Vekić (qualified)
2. (Serbia) Aleksandra Krunić (qualifying competition, lucky loser)
3. (Canada) Rebecca Marino (qualified)
4. (Ukraine) Lesia Tsurenko (qualified)
5. (United States) CoCo Vandeweghe (qualified)
6. (Australia) Maddison Inglis (qualifying competition)
7. (Spain) Cristina Bucșa (qualifying competition)
8. (Poland) Katarzyna Kawa (first round)
9. (Australia) Astra Sharma (first round)
10. (China) Wang Qiang (moved to main draw)
11. (Romania) Gabriela Lee (qualifying competition)
12. (Mexico) Fernanda Contreras (qualifying competition)

=== Qualifiers ===
1. (Croatia) Donna Vekić
2. (Croatia) Jana Fett
3. (Canada) Rebecca Marino
4. (Ukraine) Lesia Tsurenko
5. (United States) CoCo Vandeweghe
6. (United States) Caty McNally

=== Lucky loser ===
1. (Serbia) Aleksandra Krunić

=== Qualifying draw ===
==== First qualifier ====
First round
1	(Croatia) Donna Vekić	7	6
(United Kingdom) Katie Swan	5	4
WC	(United Kingdom) Freya Christie	4	6	2
11	(Romania) Gabriela Lee	6	3	6

Qualifying competition
1	(Croatia) Donna Vekić	6	6
11	(Romania) Gabriela Lee	3	1

==== Second qualifier ====
First round
2	(Serbia) Aleksandra Krunić	6	6
(Finland) Anastasia Kulikova	4	3
(Croatia) Jana Fett	6	6^{1}	6
Alt	(United States) Catherine Harrison	1	7^{7}	0

Qualifying competition
2	(Serbia) Aleksandra Krunić	4	2
(Croatia) Jana Fett	6	6

==== Third qualifier ====
First round
3	(Canada) Rebecca Marino	6	6
PR	(Australia) Kimberly Birrell	2	4
(Georgia (country)) Mariam Bolkvadze	1	3
7	(Spain) Cristina Bucșa	6	6

Qualifying competition
3	(Canada) Rebecca Marino	6	6
7	(Spain) Cristina Bucșa	0	2

==== Fourth qualifier ====
First round
4	(Ukraine) Lesia Tsurenko	6	6
WC	(United Kingdom) Emily Appleton	4	4
(United States) Emina Bektas	3	2
12	(Mexico) Fernanda Contreras Gómez	6	6

Qualifying competition
4	(Ukraine) Lesia Tsurenko	6	6
12	(Mexico) Fernanda Contreras Gómez	4	2

==== Fifth qualifier ====
First round
5	(United States) CoCo Vandeweghe	6	6
(Australia) Olivia Gadecki	2	4
WC	(United Kingdom) Eden Silva	6^{6}	6	6
8	(Poland) Katarzyna Kawa	7^{8}	4	4

Qualifying competition
5	(United States) CoCo Vandeweghe	6	7^{7}
WC	(United Kingdom) Eden Silva	3	6^{4}

==== Sixth qualifier ====
First round
6	(Australia) Maddison Inglis	6	6
WC	(United Kingdom) Sarah Beth Grey	4	2
(United States) Caty McNally	6	6
9	(Australia) Astra Sharma	2	2

Qualifying competition
6	(Australia) Maddison Inglis	3	6	1
(United States) Caty McNally	6	4	6
