= 2022 Birmingham Classic – Doubles =

Doubles
- 2022 Birmingham Classic

Final
- Champions: (Ukraine) Lyudmyla Kichenok (Latvia) Jeļena Ostapenko
- Runners-up: (Belgium) Elise Mertens (China) Zhang Shuai
- Score: Walkover

Events
Singles	Doubles
← 2021 ·	Birmingham Classic	· 2023 →

Lyudmyla Kichenok and Jeļena Ostapenko won the women's doubles title at the 2022 Birmingham Classic, after Elise Mertens and Zhang Shuai withdrew from the final due to an injury sustained by Zhang during the singles final.

Marie Bouzková and Lucie Hradecká were the defending champions; since Bouzková did not return to compete, Hradecká partnered alongside Sania Mirza – they lost in the semifinals to Kichenok and Ostapenko.

== Seeds ==
1. (Belgium) Elise Mertens / (China) Zhang Shuai (final, withdrew)
2. (Ukraine) Lyudmyla Kichenok / (Latvia) Jeļena Ostapenko (champions)
3. (Czech Republic) Lucie Hradecká / (India) Sania Mirza (semifinals)
4. (Japan) Shuko Aoyama / (Chinese Taipei) Chan Hao-ching (quarterfinals)

== Draw ==
=== Key ===
- Q = Qualifier
- WC = Wild card
- LL = Lucky loser
- Alt = Alternate
- SE = Special exempt
- PR = Protected ranking
- ITF = ITF entry
- JE = Junior exempt
- w/o = Walkover
- r = Retired
- d = Defaulted
- SR = Special ranking

=== Draw ===
First round
1	(Belgium) E Mertens (China) S Zhang	6	6
(United States) C Harrison (United States) S Santamaria	2	3
(Romania) M Niculescu (Romania) E-G Ruse	7	3	[10]
(Germany) V Heisen (United Kingdom) S Murray Sharan	5	6	[3]
4	(Japan) S Aoyama (Chinese Taipei) H-c Chan	6	6^{5}	[10]
(United Kingdom) E Appleton (United Kingdom) A Collins	3	7^{7}	[4]
(Romania) S Halep (Croatia) D Vekić	3	6^{7}
(Chinese Taipei) L Chan (Australia) S Stosur	6	7^{9}
(Poland) K Kawa (Poland) K Piter	2	5
WC	(United Kingdom) H Dart (United Kingdom) SB Grey	6	7
(United Kingdom) A Barnett (United Kingdom) O Nicholls	5	2
3	(Czech Republic) L Hradecká (India) S Mirza	7	6
(United States) L Davis (United States) C McNally	6	6
(Slovenia) K Juvan (Poland) M Linette	1	3
(Ukraine) N Kichenok (Serbia) A Krunić	3	4
2	(Ukraine) L Kichenok (Latvia) J Ostapenko	6	6

Quarterfinals
1	(Belgium) E Mertens (China) S Zhang	6	7^{7}
(Romania) M Niculescu (Romania) E-G Ruse	2	6^{2}
4	(Japan) S Aoyama (Chinese Taipei) H-c Chan	4	6	[7]
(Chinese Taipei) L Chan (Australia) S Stosur	6	3	[10]
WC	(United Kingdom) H Dart (United Kingdom) SB Grey	3	2
3	(Czech Republic) L Hradecká (India) S Mirza	6	6
(United States) L Davis (United States) C McNally	1	6	[10]
2	(Ukraine) L Kichenok (Latvia) J Ostapenko	6	4	[12]

Semifinals
1	(Belgium) E Mertens (China) S Zhang	6	7
(Chinese Taipei) L Chan (Australia) S Stosur	1	5
3	(Czech Republic) L Hradecká (India) S Mirza	6^{5}	6^{7}
2	(Ukraine) L Kichenok (Latvia) J Ostapenko	7^{7}	7^{9}

Final
1	(Belgium) E Mertens (China) S Zhang
2	(Ukraine) L Kichenok (Latvia) J Ostapenko	w/o
