= 2021 Birmingham Classic – Singles =

Singles
- 2021 Birmingham Classic

Final
- Champion: (Tunisia) Ons Jabeur
- Runner-up: (Russia) Daria Kasatkina
- Score: 7–5, 6–4

Details
- Draw: 32 (6 Q / 3 WC )
- Seeds: 8

Events
Singles	Doubles
← 2019 ·	Birmingham Classic	· 2022 →

Ons Jabeur defeated Daria Kasatkina in the final, 7–5, 6–4, to win the singles tennis title at the 2021 Birmingham Classic. By winning her first career singles title on her third attempt, Jabeur became the first Tunisian and Arab woman to win a singles title on the WTA Tour.

Ashleigh Barty was the defending champion from when the event was last held in 2019, but she chose to play in Berlin instead, where she later withdrew from due to injury.

== Seeds ==
1. (Belgium) Elise Mertens (first round)
2. (Tunisia) Ons Jabeur (champion)
3. (Croatia) Donna Vekić (quarterfinals)
4. (Russia) Daria Kasatkina (final)
5. (Latvia) Jeļena Ostapenko (second round)
6. (China) Zhang Shuai (second round, retired)
7. (France) Fiona Ferro (first round)
8. (Czech Republic) Marie Bouzková (quarterfinals)

== Draw ==
=== Key ===
- Q = Qualifier
- WC = Wild card
- LL = Lucky loser
- Alt = Alternate
- SE = Special exempt
- PR = Protected ranking
- ITF = ITF entry
- JE = Junior exempt
- w/o = Walkover
- r = Retired
- d = Defaulted
- SR = Special ranking

=== Finals ===
Semifinals
Q	(United States) CoCo Vandeweghe	2	4
4	(Russia) Daria Kasatkina	6	6
(United Kingdom) Heather Watson	3	3
2	(Tunisia) Ons Jabeur	6	6

Final
4	(Russia) Daria Kasatkina	5	4
2	(Tunisia) Ons Jabeur	7	6

=== Top half ===
First round
1	(Belgium) E Mertens	6^{5}	7^{7}	6^{4}
(Australia) A Tomljanović	7^{7}	6^{5}	7^{7}
Q	(United States) C Vandeweghe	6	7^{7}
(Czech Republic) Kr Plíšková	4	6^{1}
WC	(United Kingdom) H Dart	5	6	4
(France) C Garcia	7	4	6
(Chinese Taipei) S-w Hsieh	6	1	2
8	(Czech Republic) M Bouzková	3	6	6
4	(Russia) D Kasatkina	4	6	6
(Slovenia) P Hercog	6	3	3
(United States) M Brengle	6	5	3
(Ukraine) M Kostyuk	4	7	6
WC	(Australia) S Stosur	3	4
Q	(Czech Republic) T Martincová	6	6
(United States) L Davis	4	1
5	(Latvia) J Ostapenko	6	6

Second round
(Australia) A Tomljanović	6	4	3
Q	(United States) C Vandeweghe	4	6	6
(France) C Garcia	3	0
8	(Czech Republic) M Bouzková	6	6
4	(Russia) D Kasatkina	6	7
(Ukraine) M Kostyuk	2	5
Q	(Czech Republic) T Martincová	7^{7}	4	6
5	(Latvia) J Ostapenko	6^{4}	6	2

Quarterfinals
Q	(United States) C Vandeweghe	6	6
8	(Czech Republic) M Bouzková	4	4
4	(Russia) D Kasatkina	6	2	6
Q	(Czech Republic) T Martincová	4	6	0

Semifinals
Q	(United States) C Vandeweghe	2	4
4	(Russia) D Kasatkina	6	6

=== Bottom half ===
First round
6	(China) S Zhang	6	7
Q	(Russia) V Diatchenko	2	5
(Switzerland) V Golubic	6	2	2
(United Kingdom) H Watson	3	6	6
(Italy) C Giorgi	6	6
Q	(Italy) G Gatto-Monticone	3	0
WC	(United Kingdom) F Jones	1	3
3	(Croatia) D Vekić	6	6
7	(France) F Ferro	6	3	4
(France) K Mladenovic	3	6	6
(Serbia) N Stojanović	7	6^{8}	4
(Russia) A Potapova	5	7^{10}	6
(Canada) LA Fernandez	7	6
Q	(China) Y Wang	5	3
Q	(United States) C McNally	4	2
2	(Tunisia) O Jabeur	6	6

Second round
6	(China) S Zhang	2^{r}
(United Kingdom) H Watson	5
(Italy) C Giorgi	6	3	4
3	(Croatia) D Vekić	2	6	6
(France) K Mladenovic	3	3
(Russia) A Potapova	6	6
(Canada) LA Fernandez	4	6	6^{3}
2	(Tunisia) O Jabeur	6	3	7^{7}

Quarterfinals
(United Kingdom) H Watson	6	6
3	(Croatia) D Vekić	4	2
(Russia) A Potapova	4	0
2	(Tunisia) O Jabeur	6	6

Semifinals
(United Kingdom) H Watson	3	3
2	(Tunisia) O Jabeur	6	6

== Qualifying ==
=== Seeds ===
1. (Czech Republic) Tereza Martincová (qualified)
2. (Colombia) Camila Osorio (withdrew)
3. (United States) Caty McNally (qualified)
4. (China) Wang Yafan (qualified)
5. (Australia) Astra Sharma (first round)
6. (Russia) Vitalia Diatchenko (qualified)
7. (Japan) Kurumi Nara (qualifying competition)
8. (Ukraine) Kateryna Kozlova (qualifying competition)
9. (Italy) Giulia Gatto-Monticone (qualified)
10. (Spain) Georgina García Pérez (qualifying competition)
11. (Russia) Marina Melnikova (qualifying competition)
12. (United Kingdom) Francesca Jones (Received main draw wildcard)

=== Qualifiers ===
1. (Czech Republic) Tereza Martincová
2. (United States) CoCo Vandeweghe
3. (United States) Caty McNally
4. (China) Wang Yafan
5. (Italy) Giulia Gatto-Monticone
6. (Russia) Vitalia Diatchenko

=== Qualifying draw ===
==== First qualifier ====
First round
1	(Czech Republic) Tereza Martincová	4
(Slovenia) Dalila Jakupović	2^{r}
(Australia) Ellen Perez	6^{5}	5
10	(Spain) Georgina García Pérez	7^{7}	7

Qualifying competition
1	(Czech Republic) Tereza Martincová	6	6
10	(Spain) Georgina García Pérez	3	2

==== Second qualifier ====
First round
Alt	(Canada) Gabriela Dabrowski	2	2
PR	(United States) CoCo Vandeweghe	6	6
(United Kingdom) Emily Webley-Smith	2	0
8/PR	(Ukraine) Kateryna Kozlova	6	6

Qualifying competition
PR	(United States) CoCo Vandeweghe	6	6^{1}	6
8/PR	(Ukraine) Kateryna Kozlova	4	7^{7}	4

==== Third qualifier ====
First round
3	(United States) Caty McNally	6	7^{7}
WC	(United Kingdom) Tara Moore	2	6^{4}
WC	(United Kingdom) Naomi Broady	3	4
7	(Japan) Kurumi Nara	6	6

Qualifying competition
3	(United States) Caty McNally	6	6
7	(Japan) Kurumi Nara	3	0

==== Fourth qualifier ====
First round
4/PR	(China) Wang Yafan	6	6
(Russia) Valeria Savinykh	1	4
WC	(United Kingdom) Sarah Beth Grey	2	6	3
11	(Russia) Marina Melnikova	6	2	6

Qualifying competition
4/PR	(China) Wang Yafan	6	7
11	(Russia) Marina Melnikova	3	5

==== Fifth qualifier ====
First round
5	(Australia) Astra Sharma	2	6^{6}
WC	(United Kingdom) Eden Silva	6	7^{8}
(Italy) Martina Di Giuseppe	4	4
9	(Italy) Giulia Gatto-Monticone	6	6

Qualifying competition
WC	(United Kingdom) Eden Silva	0	1
9	(Italy) Giulia Gatto-Monticone	6	6

==== Sixth qualifier ====
First round
6	(Russia) Vitalia Diatchenko	6	1	7
(United States) Katie Volynets	3	6	5
WC	(United Kingdom) Naiktha Bains	6	7^{7}
Alt	(United States) Ingrid Neel	4	6^{3}

Qualifying competition
6	(Russia) Vitalia Diatchenko	7^{7}	6
WC	(United Kingdom) Naiktha Bains	6^{1}	3
