= 2021 Birmingham Classic =

- Date: 14–20 June
- Edition: 39th
- Category: WTA 250 tournaments
- Draw: 32S / 16D
- Surface: Grass
- Location: Birmingham, United Kingdom
- Venue: Edgbaston Priory Club

Champions

Singles
- (Tunisia) Ons Jabeur

Doubles
- (Czech Republic) Marie Bouzková / (Czech Republic) Lucie Hradecká
- Birmingham Classic

The 2021 Birmingham Classic (also known as the Viking Classic Birmingham for sponsorship reasons) was a women's tennis tournament being played on outdoor grass courts. It was the 39th edition of the event, and a WTA 250 tournament on the 2021 WTA Tour. It took place at the Edgbaston Priory Club in Birmingham, United Kingdom, on 14–20 June 2021.

== Champions ==
=== Singles ===
- (Tunisia) Ons Jabeur def. (Russia) Daria Kasatkina, 7–5, 6–4

=== Doubles ===
- (Czech Republic) Marie Bouzková / (Czech Republic) Lucie Hradecká def. (Tunisia) Ons Jabeur / (Australia) Ellen Perez 6–4, 2–6, [10–8]

== Points and prize money ==
=== Point distribution ===
Event	W	F	SF	QF	Round of 16	Round of 32^{1}	Q	Q2	Q1
Singles	280	180	110	60	30	1	18	12	1
Doubles	280	180	110	60	1	—N/a	—N/a	—N/a	—N/a

=== Prize money ===
Event	W	F	SF	QF	Round of 16	Round of 32	Q2	Q1
Singles	$29,800	$16,398	$10,100	$5,800	$3,675	$2,675	$1,950	$1,270
Doubles *	$10,300	$6,000	$3,800	$2,300	$1,750	—N/a	—N/a	—N/a

_{^{1}Qualifiers prize money is also the round of 32 prize money.}
_{*per team}

== Singles main draw entrants ==
=== Seeds ===
Country	Player	Rank^{1}	Seed
BEL	Elise Mertens	15	1
TUN	Ons Jabeur	26	2
CRO	Donna Vekić	36	3
RUS	Daria Kasatkina	37	4
LAT	Jeļena Ostapenko	44	5
CHN	Zhang Shuai	46	6
FRA	Fiona Ferro	51	7
CZE	Marie Bouzková	52	8

- ^{1} Rankings are as of 31 May 2021.

=== Other entrants ===
The following players received wildcards into the main draw:

- (United Kingdom) Harriet Dart
- (United Kingdom) Francesca Jones
- (Australia) Samantha Stosur

The following players received entry from the qualifying draw:

- (Russia) Vitalia Diatchenko
- (Italy) Giulia Gatto-Monticone
- (Czech Republic) Tereza Martincová
- (United States) Caty McNally
- (United States) CoCo Vandeweghe
- (China) Wang Yafan

=== Withdrawals ===
Before the tournament

- (Spain) Paula Badosa → replaced by (Serbia) Nina Stojanović
- (United States) Coco Gauff → replaced by (Chinese Taipei) Hsieh Su-wei
- (United Kingdom) Johanna Konta → replaced by (Italy) Camila Giorgi
- (Estonia) Anett Kontaveit → replaced by (Canada) Leylah Annie Fernandez
- (Russia) Svetlana Kuznetsova → replaced by (United Kingdom) Heather Watson
- (Poland) Magda Linette → replaced by (Switzerland) Viktorija Golubic
- (Latvia) Anastasija Sevastova → replaced by (Ukraine) Marta Kostyuk
- (Switzerland) Jil Teichmann → replaced by (Australia) Ajla Tomljanović
- (Russia) Elena Vesnina → replaced by (France) Kristina Mladenovic
- (China) Wang Qiang → replaced by (Slovenia) Polona Hercog
- (China) Zheng Saisai → replaced by (Russia) Anastasia Potapova

== Doubles main draw entrants ==
=== Seeds ===
Country	Player	Country	Player	Rank^{1}	Seed
TPE	Hsieh Su-wei	BEL	Elise Mertens	5	1
TPE	Chan Hao-ching	TPE	Latisha Chan	42	2
CAN	Gabriela Dabrowski	CHN	Zhang Shuai	54	3
USA	Caroline Dolehide	USA	Caty McNally	80	4

- ^{1} Rankings are as of 31 May 2021.

=== Other entrants ===
The following pairs received wildcards into the doubles main draw:

- (United Kingdom) Naiktha Bains / (Czech Republic) Tereza Martincová
- (United Kingdom) Sarah Beth Grey / (United Kingdom) Emily Webley-Smith

=== Withdrawals ===
Before the tournament

- (Slovenia) Dalila Jakupović / (United States) Sabrina Santamaria → replaced by (United Kingdom) Harriet Dart / (United Kingdom) Heather Watson
- (Poland) Magda Linette / (Poland) Alicja Rosolska → replaced by (Latvia) Jeļena Ostapenko / (Poland) Alicja Rosolska
- (United States) Bethanie Mattek-Sands / (India) Sania Mirza → replaced by (United Kingdom) Tara Moore / (United Kingdom) Eden Silva
