= 2019 Birmingham Classic – Doubles =

Doubles
- 2019 Birmingham Classic

Final
- Champions: (Chinese Taipei) Hsieh Su-wei (Czech Republic) Barbora Strýcová
- Runners-up: (Germany) Anna-Lena Grönefeld (Netherlands) Demi Schuurs
- Score: 6–4, 6–7^{(4–7)}, [10–8]

Details
- Draw: 16 (2WC)
- Seeds: 4

Events
Singles	Doubles
- Birmingham Classic

Tímea Babos and Kristina Mladenovic were the defending champions, but chose not to participate this year.

Hsieh Su-wei and Barbora Strýcová won the title, defeating Anna-Lena Grönefeld and Demi Schuurs in the final, 6–4, 6–7^{(4–7)}, [10–8].

== Seeds ==
1. (Canada) Gabriela Dabrowski / (China) Xu Yifan (first round)
2. (Chinese Taipei) Hsieh Su-wei / (Czech Republic) Barbora Strýcová (champions)
3. (United States) Nicole Melichar / (Czech Republic) Květa Peschke (quarterfinals)
4. (Germany) Anna-Lena Grönefeld / (Netherlands) Demi Schuurs (final)

== Draw ==
Key

- Q = Qualifier
- WC = Wild card
- LL = Lucky loser
- Alt = Alternate
- ITF = ITF entry
- PR = Protected ranking
- SR = Special ranking
- SE = Special exempt
- JE = Junior exempt
- JR = Junior Accelerator Programme entrant
- CO = College Accelerator Programme entrant
- NG = Next Gen Accelerator Program entrant
- w/o = Walkover
- r = Retired
- d = Defaulted

=== Draw ===
First round
1	(Canada) G Dabrowski (China) Y Xu	4	6^{4}
(China) Q Wang (Ukraine) D Yastremska	6	7^{7}
(Australia) A Barty (Germany) J Görges	6	6
(United States) K Christian (Slovenia) D Jakupović	3	4
4	(Germany) A-L Grönefeld (Netherlands) D Schuurs	6	5	[10]
(Chinese Taipei) H-c Chan (Chinese Taipei) L Chan	4	7	[4]
(Ukraine) N Kichenok (United States) A Spears	4	7^{7}	[10]
WC	(United Kingdom) H Dart (United States) V Williams	6	6^{3}	[7]
(Latvia) J Ostapenko (Kazakhstan) G Voskoboeva	6	6^{3}	[10]
WC	(United Kingdom) SB Grey (United Kingdom) E Silva	0	7^{7}	[8]
(Poland) A Rosolska (China) Z Yang	1	5
3	(United States) N Melichar (Czech Republic) K Peschke	6	7
(Romania) M Buzărnescu (United Kingdom) H Watson	4	3
(United States) R Atawo (Ukraine) L Kichenok	6	6
(Croatia) D Jurak (Slovenia) K Srebotnik	6	1	[8]
2	(Chinese Taipei) S-w Hsieh (Czech Republic) B Strýcová	4	6	[10]

Quarterfinals
(China) Q Wang (Ukraine) D Yastremska	0	3
(Australia) A Barty (Germany) J Görges	6	6
4	(Germany) A-L Grönefeld (Netherlands) D Schuurs	6	6
(Ukraine) N Kichenok (United States) A Spears	4	4
(Latvia) J Ostapenko (Kazakhstan) G Voskoboeva	6	6
3	(United States) N Melichar (Czech Republic) K Peschke	3	4
(United States) R Atawo (Ukraine) L Kichenok	1^{r}
2	(Chinese Taipei) S-w Hsieh (Czech Republic) B Strýcová	4

Semifinals
(Australia) A Barty (Germany) J Görges
4	(Germany) A-L Grönefeld (Netherlands) D Schuurs	w/o
(Latvia) J Ostapenko (Kazakhstan) G Voskoboeva	0	3
2	(Chinese Taipei) S-w Hsieh (Czech Republic) B Strýcová	6	6

Final
4	(Germany) A-L Grönefeld (Netherlands) D Schuurs	4	7^{7}	[8]
2	(Chinese Taipei) S-w Hsieh (Czech Republic) B Strýcová	6	6^{4}	[10]
