= Elise Mertens =

Belgian tennis player (born 1995)

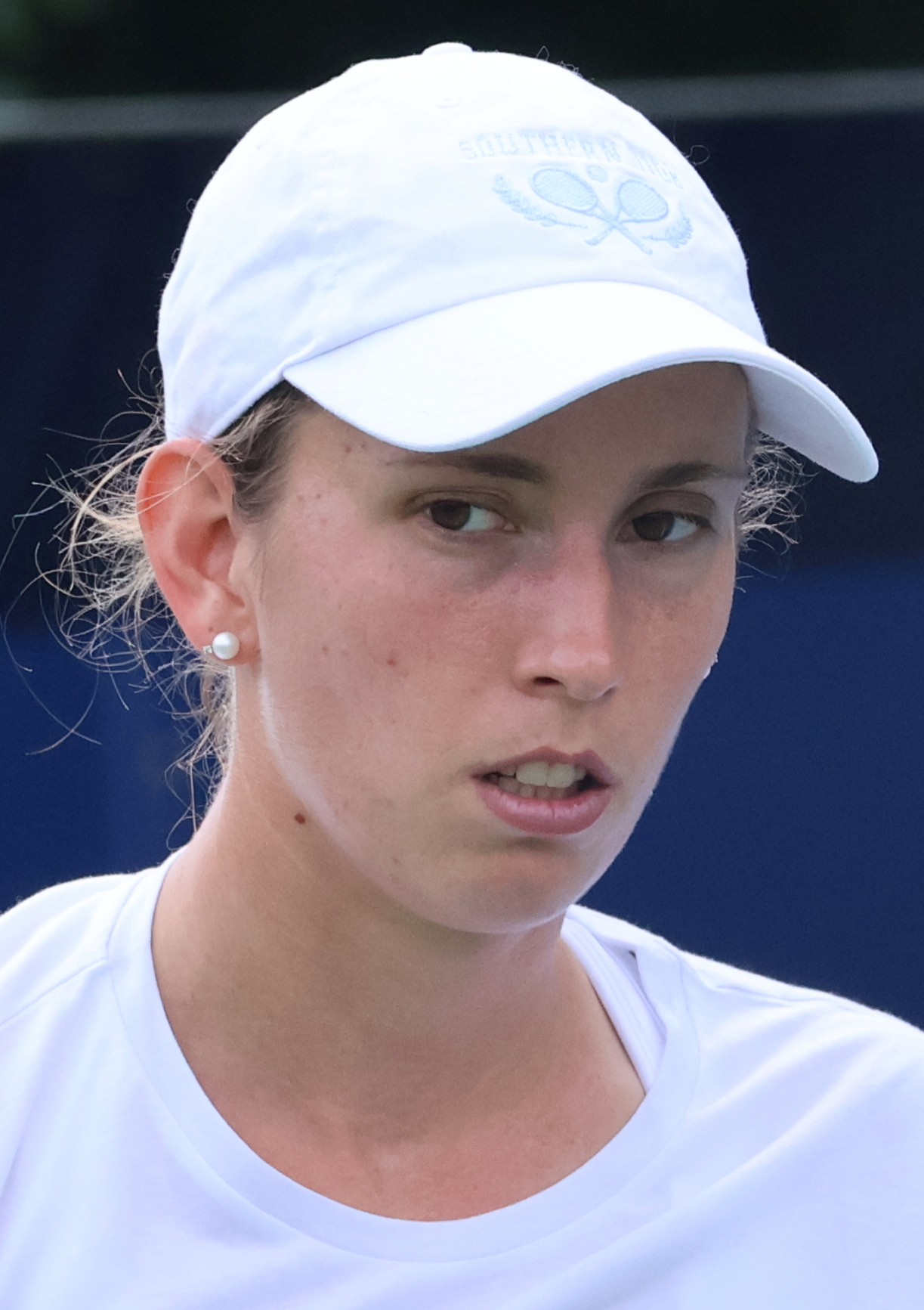
- Mertens at the 2024 Washington Open
- Country (sports): Belgium
- Residence: Hamont-Achel, Belgium
- Born: 17 November 1995 (age 30) Leuven, Belgium
- Height: 1.79 m (5 ft 10 in)
- Turned pro: 2013
- Plays: Right-handed (two-handed backhand)
- Coach: Christopher Heyman
- Prize money: US$ 20,184,065: 30th all-time in earnings

Singles
- Career record: 502–298
- Career titles: 10
- Highest ranking: No. 12 (26 November 2018)
- Current ranking: No. 14 (12 October 2026)

Grand Slam singles results
- Australian Open: SF (2018)
- French Open: 4R (2018, 2022, 2023)
- Wimbledon: QF (2026)
- US Open: QF (2019, 2020)

Other tournaments
- Olympic Games: 1R (2020)

Doubles
- Career record: 424–181
- Career titles: 24
- Highest ranking: No. 1 (10 May 2021)
- Current ranking: No. 8 (24 August 2026)

Grand Slam doubles results
- Australian Open: W (2021, 2024, 2026)
- French Open: SF (2019)
- Wimbledon: W (2021, 2025)
- US Open: W (2019)

Other doubles tournaments
- Tour Finals: W (2022, 2025)
- Olympic Games: 1R (2020)

Team competitions
- Fed Cup: QF (2018, 2019), record 14–8
- Hopman Cup: RR (2018)
- Last updated on: 31 August 2026.

Elise Mertens (Dutch pronunciation: [eːˈlizə ˈmɛrtəns]; born 17 November 1995) is a Belgian professional tennis player. She became the world No. 1 in women's doubles on 10 May 2021, the third Belgian to hold a top ranking in either singles or doubles (after Kim Clijsters and Justine Henin). She has won 28 WTA Tour-level titles, comprising 10 in singles and 18 in doubles.

Mertens is a six-time major champion in doubles, having won the 2019 US Open and 2021 Australian Open partnering Aryna Sabalenka, the 2021 Wimbledon Championships and 2024 Australian Open with Hsieh Su-wei, the 2025 Wimbledon Championships with Veronika Kudermetova, and the 2026 Australian Open with Zhang Shuai. She also finished runner-up at the 2022 Wimbledon Championships with Zhang and at the 2023 Wimbledon Championships with Storm Hunter. Mertens has won 24 doubles titles overall, including the 2022 and 2025 WTA Finals titles with Veronika Kudermetova, six at the WTA 1000 level, and finished runner-up at the 2021 WTA Finals alongside Hsieh.

Mertens is also a successful singles player, and reached a major semifinal at the 2018 Australian Open, followed by two US Open quarterfinals in 2019 and 2020. In 2026, she reached the quarterfinals once more at Wimbledon. Mertens achieved her career-high singles ranking of world No. 12 in November 2018, and has won ten WTA Tour titles, including two at the WTA 500-level. She has represented Belgium in the Billie Jean King Cup since 2017, and competed at the 2020 Tokyo Olympics in both singles and doubles.

== Personal life ==
Mertens was born in Leuven, the second daughter of Liliane Barbe, a teacher, and Guido Mertens, who makes furniture for churches. She was home-schooled and enjoyed studying languages, speaking French, English, and Flemish Dutch. Her older sister, Lauren, is currently an airline pilot and introduced the then four-year-old Elise to tennis. While growing up, Mertens looked up to Justine Henin and Kim Clijsters, and was a member of the Kim Clijsters Academy, where she had been training from 2015 until it shut down in 2022.

== Career ==
=== 2015-2016: WTA Tour debut ===
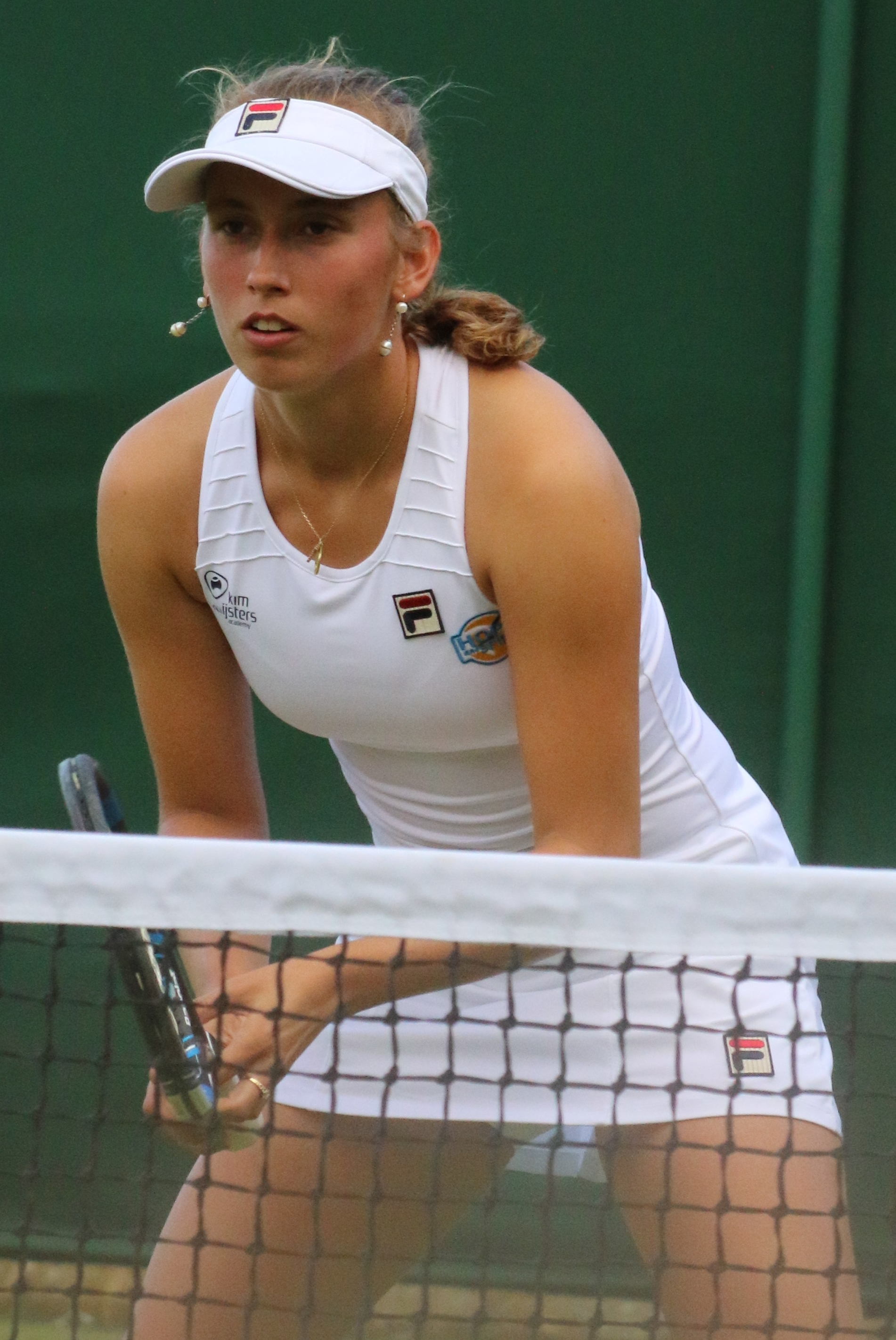
Mertens at the 2016 Wimbledon Qualifying

Mertens was a doubles finalist at the New Delhi Open, alongside Marina Melnikova.

She made her WTA Tour main-draw debut at the 2015 Copa Colsanitas in the doubles event, partnering Nastja Kolar.

She won her first career doubles title at the 2016 Auckland Open, partnering An-Sophie Mestach.

=== 2017: First WTA Tour singles title and top 40 ===
In January, Mertens won the Hobart International, beating Monica Niculescu in the final. As a result of this she broke into the WTA top 100 for the first time, on 16 January 2017.

After missing the Australian Open qualifying due to her Hobart campaign, Mertens reached the first round of the St. Petersburg Trophy through qualifying, and lost to Kristina Mladenovic in straight sets. She then competed at the Dubai Championships, where, as a qualifier, she beat Tsvetana Pironkova en route to the second round, where she lost to Agnieszka Radwańska. Despite her loss, Mertens reached a new career-ranking of world No. 69. She then lost in the first round of the Malaysian Open to Lesley Kerkhove. After that, she failed to qualify for either Indian Wells or Miami Open, losing in the first round of qualifying to Sachia Vickery and Alison Van Uytvanck, respectively.

At the Ladies Open Biel Bienne, Mertens upset Monica Niculescu and beat Mona Barthel en route to the quarterfinals, losing to Anett Kontaveit.

=== 2018: Masters doubles title, three singles titles ===
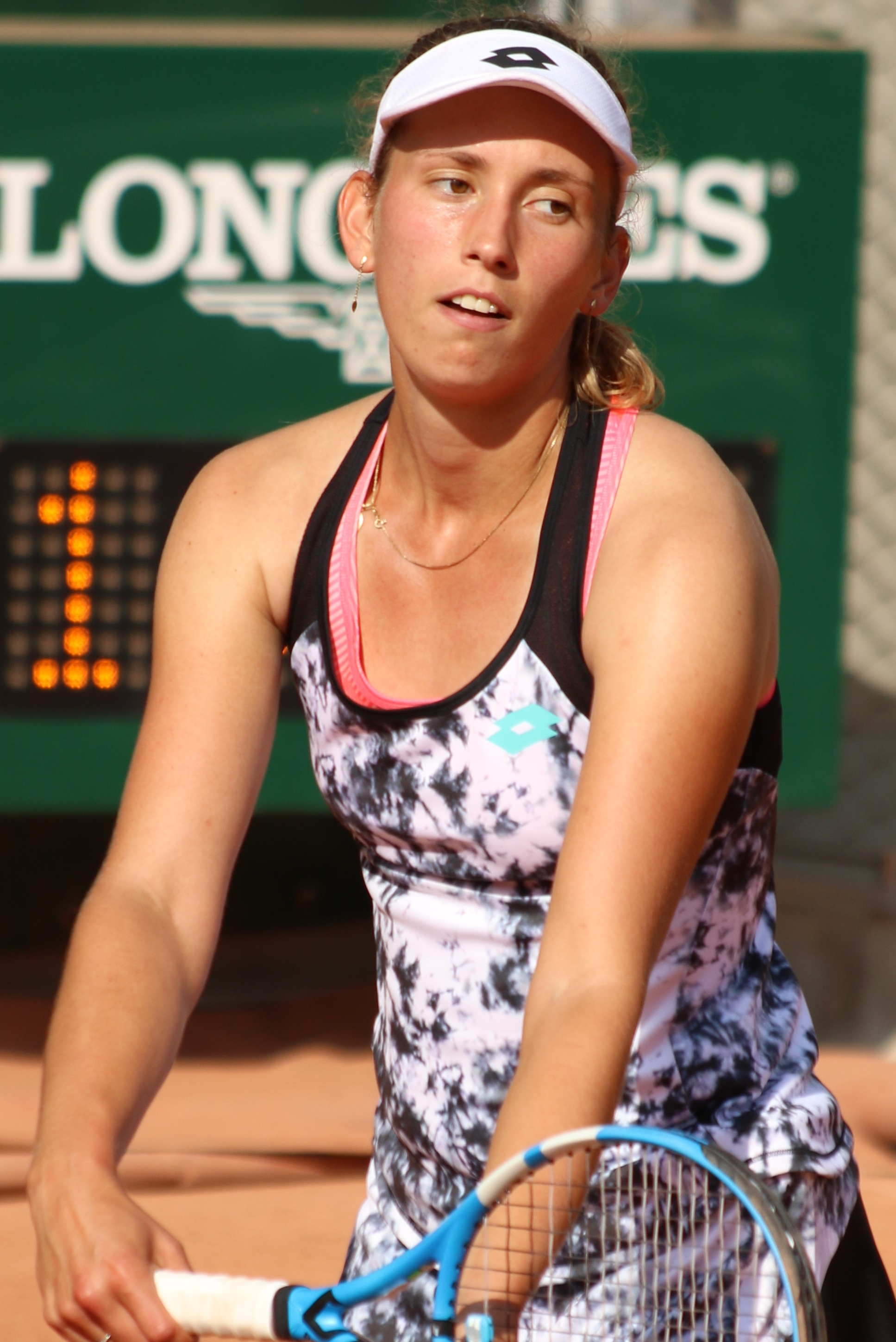
Mertens at the 2018 French Open

Mertens began the season by becoming the first woman to win back-to-back titles in Hobart. She defeated Mihaela Buzărnescu in the final, defending her title from 2017. Along with Demi Schuurs, she also won the doubles title.

Mertens' season continued with her main-draw debut at the Australian Open. She defeated qualifier Viktória Kužmová, Daria Gavrilova, Alizé Cornet and Petra Martić, all in straight sets, to advance to her first Grand Slam quarterfinal. In the quarterfinal, Mertens achieved her first victory over a top five ranked player, defeating Elina Svitolina, again in straight sets. With her win over Svitolina, Mertens became only the third Belgian woman ever to reach the last four at the tournament, joining former ranking leaders Justine Henin and Kim Clijsters. In the semifinals she lost to Caroline Wozniacki, in straight sets.

After her good form in Australia, Mertens had some difficult weeks. She lost, respectively, in the first round of Doha, Dubai and Indian Wells and in the second round in Miami. In April, she reached her fourth singles final and second of the year at the Lugano Open in Switzerland. She won the title by beating Belarusian Aryna Sabalenka in straight sets. Together with compatriot Kirsten Flipkens, she also won the doubles title. Two weeks later, she also won the singles title at the Morocco Open by defeating Australian Ajla Tomljanović, in straight sets.

Mertens lost in the second round at Madrid to Simona Halep. She reached the fourth round at the French Open, defeating Varvara Lepchenko, Heather Watson, and Daria Gavrilova before falling again to Halep, who won the title.

Mertens started off the grass-court season with first-round loss to qualifier Dalila Jakupović in Birmingham. In Eastbourne, she lost in third round to Aryna Sabalenka. At Wimbledon, Mertens lost in third round to Dominika Cibulková.

In the American swing, Mertens reached the semifinals in San Jose as well as quarterfinals in Montreal and Cincinnati. In doubles, she ended runner-up in Cincinnati and won the final in Wuhan, partnering Demi Schuurs.

=== 2019: Singles title, Sunshine Double & US Open doubles titles ===
Mertens started in Brisbane with a first-round exit against Kiki Bertens, she lost the match in three sets. Then in Sydney, she got her first two wins of the season by defeating Katerina Siniaková and Anett Kontaveit before losing in the quarterfinals to Ashleigh Barty.

Defending semifinalist points from last year, she entered the Australian Open as the 12th seed. She won her first and second match in straight sets, losing to Madison Keys in the third round. Due to her early exit, her ranking fell to No. 21.

Mertens played Fed Cup in her homecountry for the first time. In the week after, she played the Qatar Ladies Open. She began unseeded at this tournament, but she won her first Premier title. On her route to the tournament win, she defeated Kiki Bertens, Angelique Kerber and Simona Halep. After her biggest career win to date, she ranked No. 16.

In March at Indian Wells, as the 16th seeded, she lost in the third round in another battle near three hours against 18th seed Wang Qiang. Although she lost early in singles, she won a big doubles title with Sabalenka at Indian Wells, defeating first seeds Barbora Krejčíková and Kateřina Siniaková in the final. Two weeks later, the pair won the Miami Open doubles title, completing the Sunshine Double. Mertens and Sabalenka became the fifth doubles pairing in history, and first since Martina Hingis and Sania Mirza in 2015, to complete the Sunshine Double in doubles. These titles took Mertens inside the top 10 in doubles for the first time.

Mertens had a rough start to the clay-court season, losing in the opening round of four of her first five tournaments (the exception being a quarterfinal appearance in Morocco where she was upset by the eventual tournament champion Maria Sakkari). At the French Open, Mertens beat Tamara Zidanšek and Diane Parry to advance to the third round, where she was beaten by Anastasija Sevastova in a three-hour 18-minute, three-set match despite winning the first set and holding five match points in the decider. Mertens and Sabalenka performed well in the doubles draw, losing to eventual champions Tímea Babos and Kristina Mladenovic in the semifinals.

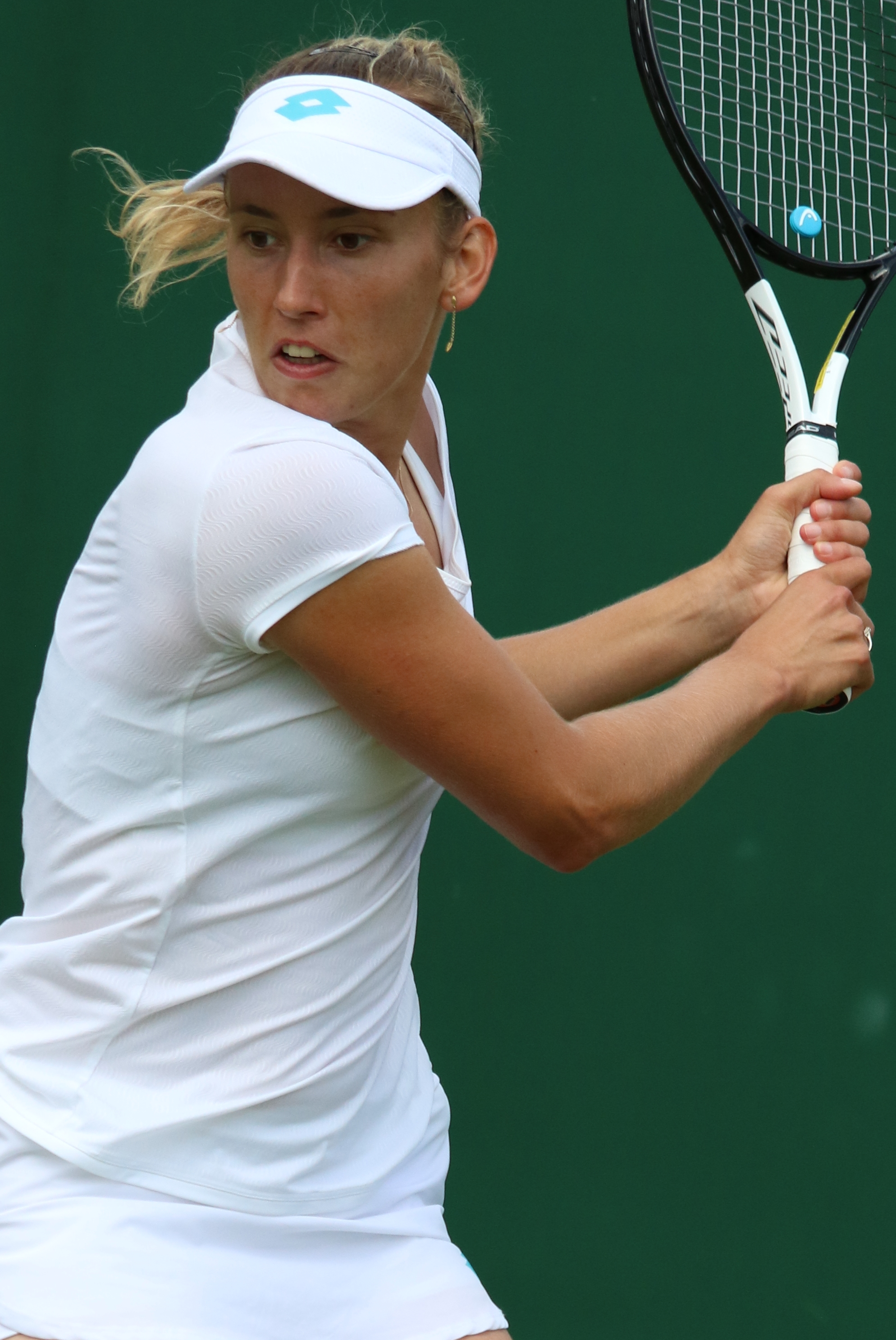
Mertens at the 2019 Wimbledon Championships

Mertens performed much stronger in the grass-court season warmup events, making the quarterfinals in Mallorca and the third round in Eastbourne (in both tournaments she lost to the eventual champions Sofia Kenin and Karolína Plíšková, respectively). At Wimbledon, Mertens advanced to the fourth round for the first time, taking out Fiona Ferro, Monica Niculescu and Wang Qiang. However, she was upset by Barbora Strýcová. In doubles, Mertens and Sabalenka advanced to the quarterfinals, but they were defeated by eventual champions Strýcová and Hsieh Su-wei, the second consecutive major the pair lost to the team that won the tournament.

In the early summer hardcourt season, Mertens struggled to replicate her 2018 success, losing her opening round match in San Jose to Kristie Ahn and falling in the second round of Toronto and Cincinnati to Serena Williams and Elina Svitolina, respectively. At the US Open, she defeated Jil Teichmann, Kristýna Plíšková, Andrea Petkovic, and Kristie Ahn to reach her second Grand Slam singles quarterfinal. She lost to the eventual champion Bianca Andreescu. Playing doubles with Sabalenka, the pair defeated Victoria Azarenka and Ashleigh Barty in the final, winning their first Grand Slam doubles title both as a team. Following the tournament, she reached a new career-high doubles ranking of No. 2 in the world.

Mertens competed at the WTA Elite Trophy in singles, where she qualified for the second straight year. Drawn in the same group as her doubles partner Sabalenka, she was beaten in three close sets by the Belarusian before defeating Sakkari in three sets. Placing second in her round-robin group, she failed to advance to her semifinals (Sabalenka won the title). She next competed at the WTA Finals in Shenzhen, playing doubles. She finished the year ranked No. 17 in singles and No. 6 in the world in doubles.

=== 2020: Two singles finals, US Open quarterfinals ===
Mertens opened the year by reaching the quarterfinals in both Shenzhen, where she was beaten by Elena Rybakina, and Hobart, losing to Heather Watson. At the Australian Open, Mertens eased through to the fourth round with straight-set wins over Danka Kovinić, Watson and CiCi Bellis before being defeated by Simona Halep. In doubles, Mertens and Sabalenka reached the quarterfinals where they lost to Chan Hao-ching and Latisha Chan. After losing early in both Dubai and Doha, Mertens was next scheduled to play in Indian Wells, but the tournament was cancelled and the tour suspended due to the COVID-19 pandemic.

When the tour resumed in August, Mertens lost her opening match in Palermo, but bounced back by reaching her first final of the year at the Prague Open. She then lost to Halep for the second time that year. At the Cincinnati Open, Mertens advanced to her first ever Premier 5 semifinal, where she was beaten by Naomi Osaka in straight sets.

At the 2020 US Open, Mertens opened her campaign by beating Laura Siegemund in straight sets, followed by two-set wins over Sara Sorribes Tormo and 18-year old Caty McNally. She then caused a huge upset by defeating Sofia Kenin in straight sets, making it to the quarterfinals of the US Open for the second consecutive year. However, she was thrashed in the quarterfinal by former world No. 1, Victoria Azarenka, winning just one game. Mertens and Sabalenka also played doubles together, where they were the defending champions. They were beaten in the quarterfinals by the eventual champions Siegemund and Zvonareva.

Mertens continued in good form throughout to the end of the year. She made quarterfinals at Rome, losing again to Karolina Plíšková in three sets. She lost in the third round of the French Open to Caroline Garcia. She then went to the Ostrava Open and defeated Amanda Anisimova and Karolína Muchová both in straight sets. She lost in a rematch against Azarenka. She and Aryna Sabalenka took the doubles title together. She finished the year with a final finish at Linz Open, losing to Sabalenka.

=== 2021: Two major titles and world No. 1 in doubles, Olympics debut ===
Mertens started off her 2021 season at the first edition of the Gippsland Trophy. She won her sixth career singles title beating Kaia Kanepi in the final, her first singles title in two years. At the Australian Open, she defeated Belinda Bencic in the third round. Her winning streak at the start of the season ended at seven when she lost to Karolína Muchová in the fourth round. In doubles, she and Sabalenka won their second Grand Slam title as a team defeating Krejčíková/Siniaková in the championship match.

Mertens continued her good run of form since the end of lockdown at the Dubai Championships. She reached the semifinals where she lost to Garbiñe Muguruza. At the Miami Open, she made the fourth round, before she was beaten by Naomi Osaka.

Mertens began her clay-court season at the Charleston Open where she suffered a second-round upset by Alizé Cornet. As the top seed at the İstanbul Cup, she made it to the final in which she lost to Sorana Cîrstea. As the top seed in doubles alongside Kudermetova, she won the title beating Nao Hibino and Makoto Ninomiya in the final. Seeded 13th at the Madrid Open, she upset world No. 3 and two-time champion, Simona Halep, in the third round. In the quarterfinals, she retired during her match against world No. 7 and fifth seed, Aryna Sabalenka, due to a left thigh injury. As the top seed in doubles with partner Hsieh Su-wei, they lost in the second round to Jeļena Ostapenko and Anastasia Pavlyuchenkova. Despite the loss, Mertens hit a huge milestone in her doubles career on 10 May 2021 by becoming the world No. 1 for the first time, joining Kim Clijsters as the second Belgian player to do so. Seeded 14th in Rome, she fell in the first round to Kudermetova. Seeded 14th at the French Open, she reached the third round but lost to Maria Sakkari in three sets. In doubles, she and Hsieh Su-wei were defeated in the third round by Bethanie Mattek-Sands and Iga Świątek despite having had seven match points.

Mertens kicked off her grass-court season at the Birmingham Classic. As the top seed, she lost her first-round match to Ajla Tomljanović in three sets which all were tie-breaks. In the doubles event with Hsieh, they reached the semifinals and lost to Ons Jabeur and Ellen Perez. Mertens competed at the Eastbourne International where she was the seventh seed. Despite winning the first set 6–0, she was beaten in the first round by Coco Gauff. Seeded 13th at Wimbledon, she lost in the third round to 23rd seed Madison Keys. In doubles, again partnering Hsieh, she reached the final where they faced the pair of Elena Vesnina and Veronika Kudermetova. In a tight match, they fought back, after having lost the first set and their opponents serving for the championship in both the second and third sets, saving two championship points in the former, and Mertens failing to successfully serve for the championship herself, to win the title. In the process, she became the first Belgian player to win three doubles Grand Slam titles and kept her unbeaten record in major finals intact. By reaching the final and winning the title, she regained the world No. 1 spot she held previously for a week in May 2021.

The week of July 24 saw Mertens representing Belgium at the Tokyo Summer Olympics. Seeded 12th, she fell in the first round to Ekaterina Alexandrova.

Mertens got her US Open preparation underway at the Silicon Valley Classic. As the top seed, she reached the semifinals where she lost to fourth seed Daria Kasatkina. Seeded ninth at the Canadian Open in Montreal, she was defeated in the first round by eventual champion Camila Giorgi. Seeded 15th at the Western & Southern Open in Cincinnati, she was ousted from the tournament in the second round by Elena Rybakina. Seeded 15th at the US Open, she beat 20th seed, Ons Jabeur, in the third round. She was eliminated in the fourth round by world No. 2 and second seed Aryna Sabalenka. As the top seed in doubles alongside Hsieh, they reached the quarterfinals where they lost to Coco Gauff and Caty McNally.

Seeded second at the Luxembourg Open, Mertens reached the quarterfinals but lost to fifth seed Markéta Vondroušová. Seeded seventh at the first edition of the Chicago Classic, she was defeated in the third round by tenth seed Danielle Collins. Seeded 14th at Indian Wells, she suffered a second-round loss at the hands of lucky loser Jasmine Paolini. In doubles, she and Hsieh won the title by defeating Kudermetova and Rybakina in the final. It was Mertens's second Indian Wells doubles title. With the victory, she regained the doubles No. 1 ranking. At the end of 2021 she decided to stop her longstanding collaboration with her coach Ceyssens, choosing Simon Goffin, David Goffin's brother instead.

=== 2022: WTA Finals doubles champion and Wimbledon finalist ===
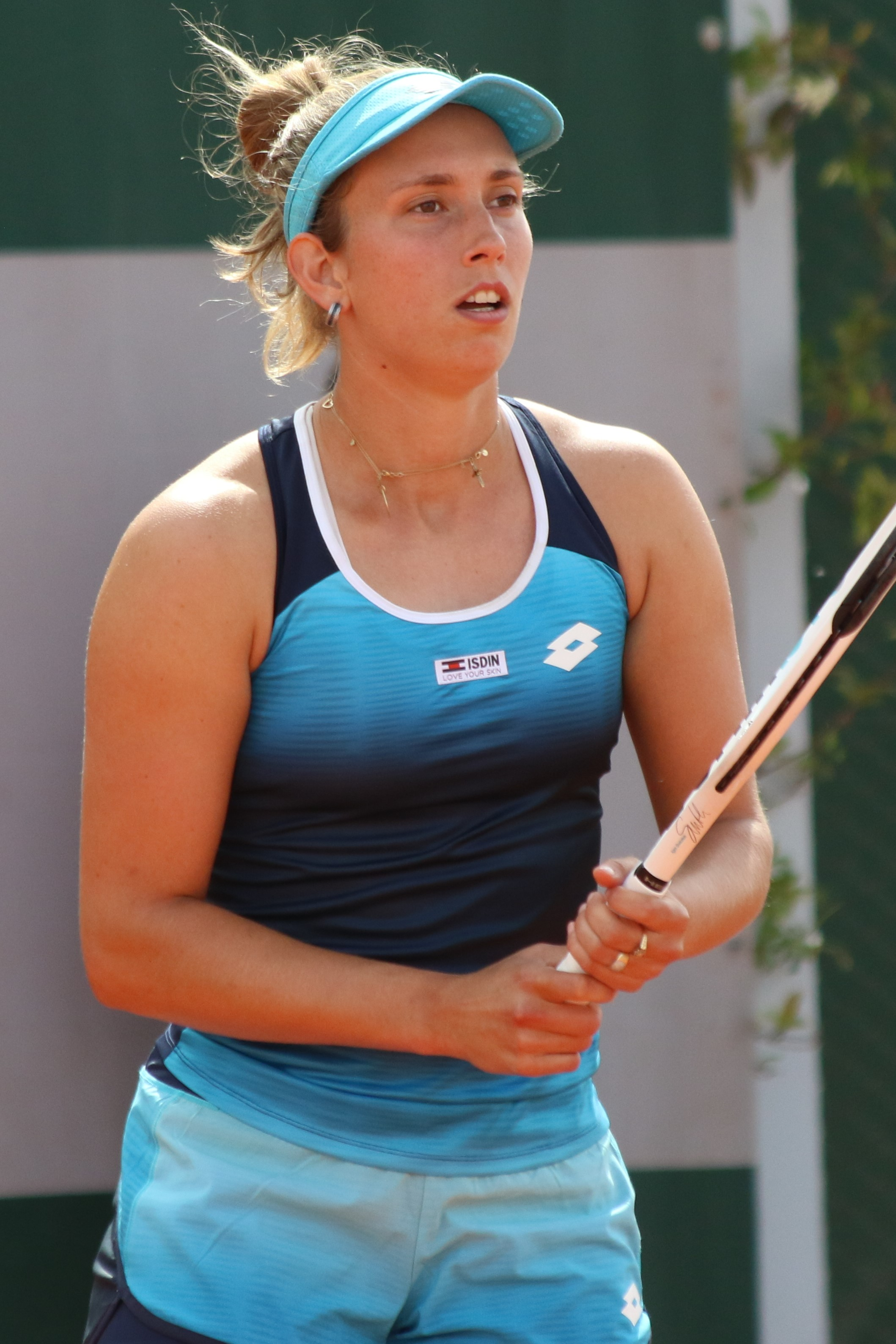
Mertens at the 2022 French Open

Mertens started her 2022 season at the Sydney International where she lost to Daria Kasatkina in the second round. Seeded 19th at the Australian Open, she reached the fourth round where she was defeated by Danielle Collins. Seeded third in doubles, she reached the semifinals with Kudermetova where they lost to eventual champions Krejčíková and Siniaková.

Seeded eighth at the St. Petersburg Ladies' Trophy, Mertens fell in the quarterfinals to Maria Sakkari. In Dubai, she was eliminated from the tournament in the first round by lucky loser and last year semifinalist, Jil Teichmann. She won her 15th doubles title with Kudermetova, defeating Jeļena Ostapenko and Lyudmyla Kichenok in the final. Seeded 16th at the Qatar Ladies Open, she won her second-round match when her opponent, two-time champion Petra Kvitová, retired due to a left wrist injury. She was beaten in the third round by Anett Kontaveit. In doubles, she and Kudermetova reached the final which they lost to Coco Gauff and Jessica Pegula. Seeded 20th at the Indian Wells Open, she lost in the third round to qualifier Daria Saville. As the top seeds and defending champions in doubles, she and Kudermetova were defeated in the first round by Eri Hozumi and Makoto Ninomiya. Seeded 20th at the Miami Open, she lost in the second round to Czech wildcard Linda Fruhvirtová. As the top seed in doubles alongside Kudermetova, she made it to the final where they lost to Laura Siegemund and Vera Zvonareva.

Mertens began her clay-court season at the İstanbul Cup. As the top seed and last year finalist, she retired during her first-round match against Rebecca Peterson due to a right leg injury. Mertens returned to action during the week of May 15 at Strasbourg. Seeded fourth, she lost in the quarterfinals to Kaja Juvan. In doubles, she and partner Diane Parry reached the semifinals where they fell to Nicole Melichar-Martinez and Daria Saville. Seeded 31st at Roland Garros, she reached the fourth round where she lost to Coco Gauff. Seeded second in doubles, she and Kudermetova lost in the third round to 13th seeded team of Xu Yifan and Yang Zhaoxuan. Despite the third-round loss, she regained her No. 1 ranking in doubles following the conclusion of the tournament on 6 June 2022.

Starting her grass-court season seeded eighth at the Rosmalen Open, Mertens lost in the second round to compatriot Alison Van Uytvanck. Seeded fourth at the Birmingham Classic, she was defeated in the first round by qualifier Caty McNally. In doubles, she and Zhang Shuai, as the top seeds, made it to the final. Unfortunately, they handed Lyudmyla Kichenok and Jeļena Ostapenko a walkover in the final due to a back injury Zhang suffered during her singles final match. Seeded 13th at the Eastbourne International, she was beaten in the second round by qualifier and compatriot, Kirsten Flipkens. Seeded 24th at Wimbledon, she upset 2018 champion and 15th seed, Angelique Kerber, in the third round, before losing to Ons Jabeur. Following a seven-month partnership, she announced her split from coach Simon Goffin. As the top seed in doubles with Zhang, she reached the final for a second consecutive time at this major. They lost in the championship match to second seeded team Krejčíková/Siniaková.

Mertens lost her world No. 1 doubles ranking on 14 August 2022. She withdrew before the 2022 Tennis in the Land feeling pain in her right thigh yet still decided to go to the US Open. She lost in the first round of singles to Irina-Camelia Begu, and as the top seed of the US Open in doubles, partnering Kudermetova, won the first round but withdrew before the second round due to the leg injury not being able to defend her prior year quarterfinal points.

Mertens returned from injury at the Pan Pacific Open. She lost in the second round to Claire Liu in singles but reached the doubles' semifinals partnering Kudermetova. Elise finally broke her poor run of form at the Jasmin Open as she stormed into her first singles final in almost 14 months. She defeated Jaqueline Cristian, Despina Papamichail, Moyuka Uchijima and avenged her last loss to Claire Liu in route to the final. In the final, she cruised past Alizé Cornet losing just two games to win her seventh WTA Tour title in Monastir.

In Guadalajara, Mertens lost to Anna Kalinskaya in the second round but she reached the doubles quarterfinal with Kudermetova and qualified for the WTA Finals in doubles for a fourth consecutive year (with four different partners). In Fort Worth, Mertens along with Kudermetova raced into the doubles final, as they finished 3–0 in the round-robin stage and eased past Desirae Krawczyk and Demi Schuurs in the semifinals. In the final, they came back from 2–7 down in the match-tiebreak to outlast defending champions and six time Grand Slam champions Krejčíková and Siniaková and win their third doubles title together. This made Mertens the first Belgian to win the WTA Finals in doubles.

=== 2023: Two WTA 1000 titles and world No. 1 in doubles ===
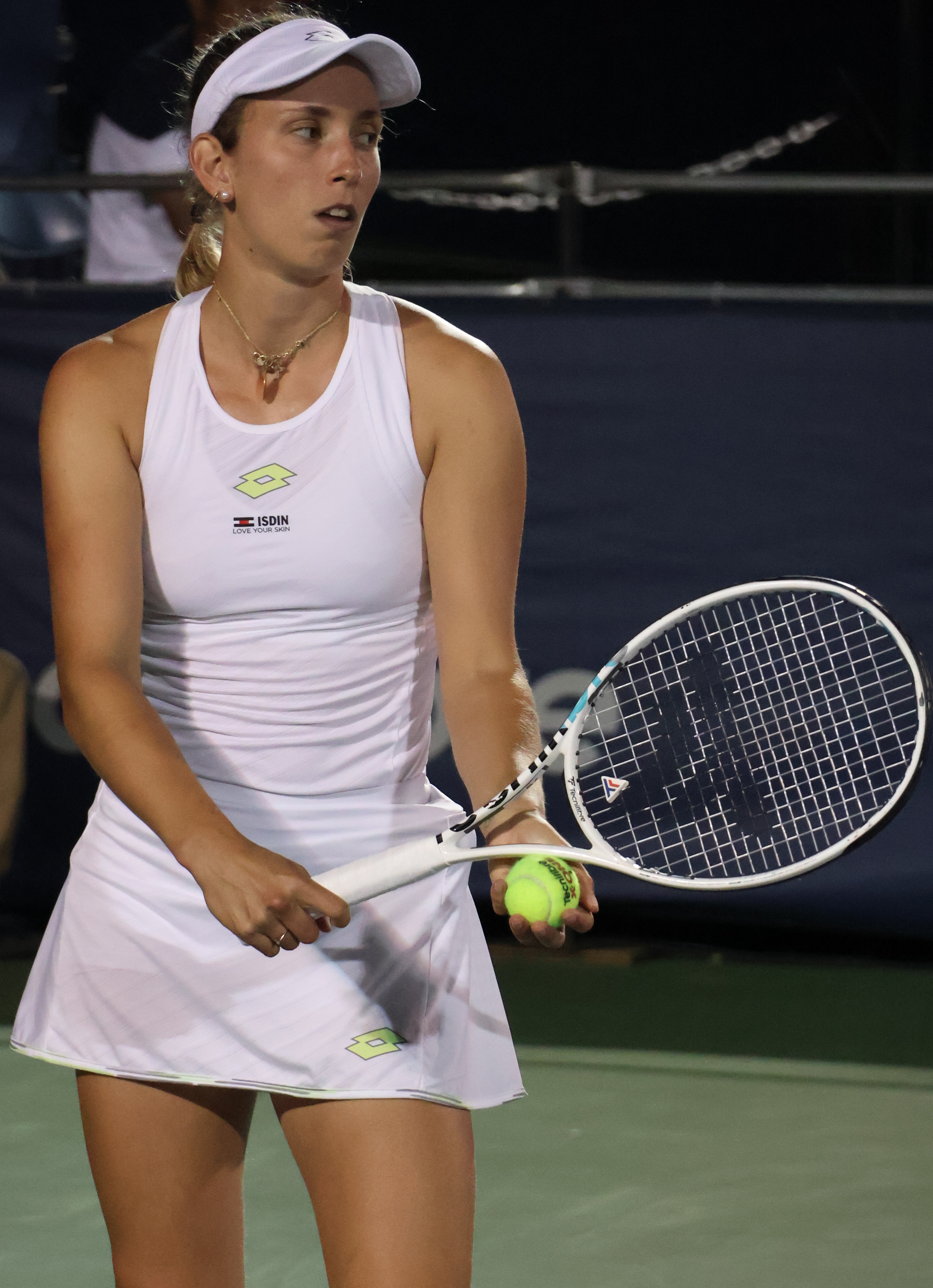
Mertens at the 2023 DC Open

In doubles, she reached her second quarterfinal at the Australian Open, with new partner Storm Hunter. In singles, she returned to the top 30 on 3 April 2023 at world No. 29 following a fourth round showing at the 2023 Miami Open where she defeated Alycia Parks, eighth seed Daria Kasatkina and 29th seed Petra Martić.

At the Madrid Open, she also reached the fourth round with wins over Rebecca Marino and Jule Niemeier but lost to Mayar Sherif. In doubles, at the Italian Open, she won her fifth WTA 1000 title partnering with Hunter. As a result, she returned to the top 10 in doubles on 22 May 2023. At the French Open, she reached the fourth round with wins over lucky losers Viktória Hrunčáková, Camila Osorio, and third seed Jessica Pegula, before losing to Anastasia Pavlyuchenkova.

She returned to world No. 1 in doubles on 25 September 2023 after more than a year, following a semifinal showing at the Guadalajara Open with Hunter. They reached the final of the tournament defeating Caroline Dolehide and Asia Muhammad. They won the title defeating Erin Routliffe and Gabriela Dabrowski. At the same tournament in singles, she lost in the second round to Leylah Fernandez.

She won her eighth singles title at the Jasmin Open in Monastir, by defending it with a win over Jasmine Paolini, and returned to the top 30 in the rankings.

At the 2023 WTA Finals, she reached the semifinals in doubles with Hunter and finished the year ranked No. 2 in doubles for the first time.

=== 2024: Third Hobart final, Australian Open title ===
As top seed, Mertens reached her third final at the Hobart International, where she lost to second seed Emma Navarro.

Seeded second with Hsieh Su-wei, she reached her second Australian Open final, defeating the third seeded pair of current world No. 1 Storm Hunter and former world No. 1 and defending champion, Kateřina Siniaková. In the final, they defeated Jeļena Ostapenko and Lyudmyla Kichenok to win their second major title together and Mertens’ fourth overall. As a result, she regained her No. 1 ranking in doubles.

Partnering with Hsieh, Mertens won the Indian Wells Open in March, defeating former world-number-one players Hunter and Siniaková and the Birmingham Classic in June, with victory over Miyu Kato and Zhang Shuai. At Wimbledon, she reached the semifinals with Hsieh.

At the Jasmin Open, where she was two-time defending champion, she lost in the round of 16 to Eva Lys.

Alongside Hsieh, Mertens qualified for the end-of-season WTA Finals but exited in the group stages after compiling a record of one win and two losses.

=== 2025: Two singles titles, fifth major doubles title ===
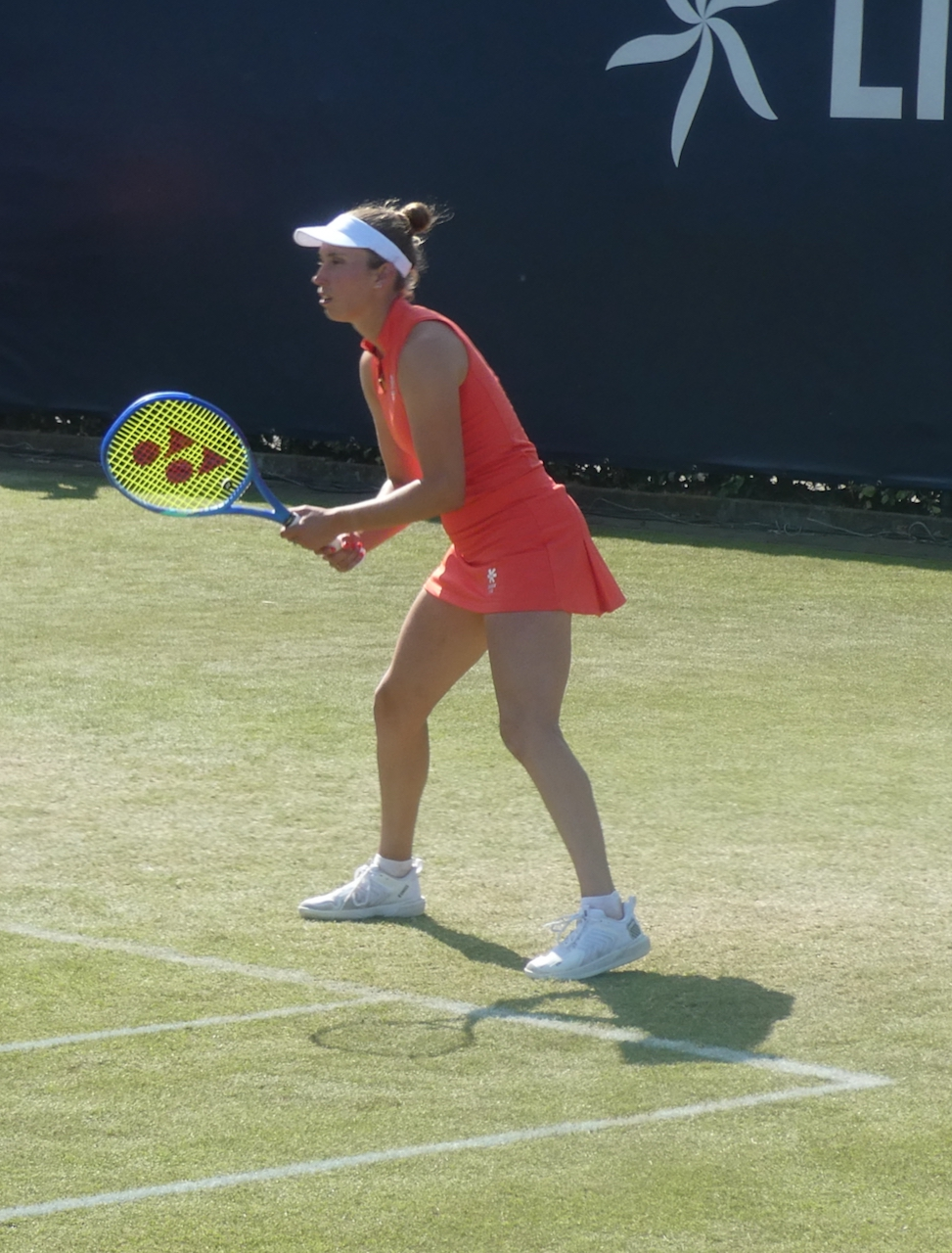
Mertens at the 2025 Rosmalen Open

As second seed, Mertens reached the final at the Hobart International, defeating Nuria Párrizas Díaz, Renata Zarazúa, Veronika Kudermetova and Maya Joint. She lost the championship match to McCartney Kessler, in three sets.

Seeded second at the Singapore Open, Mertens recorded wins over Taylor Townsend, Tatjana Maria, sixth seed Camila Osorio and fourth seed Wang Xinyu to make it through to the final, where she defeated Ann Li to claim her ninth WTA title.

Partnering Veronika Kudermetova, she finished runner-up at the Madrid Open, losing to Sorana Cîrstea and Anna Kalinskaya in the final. They also reached the final of the Italian Open in Rome, falling to Sara Errani and Jasmine Paolini, in straight sets.

She won her 10th singles title at the Rosmalen Open saving eleven match points en route to the title, thus equaling the record for match points saved to win a tennis tour-level match this century, set in 2001 at the French Open by Zsófia Gubacsi, who also went on to win her match.

At Wimbledon, partnering with Kudermetova, Mertens claimed her fifth major women's doubles title, defeating Hsieh and Ostapenko in the final.

In November, Mertens teamed with Kudermetova to win the doubles title at the season-ending WTA Finals, defeating Tímea Babos and Luisa Stefani in the final.

=== 2026: Australian doubles title, Wimbledon quarters ===
At the Australian Open, Mertens reached the fourth round in singles, where she lost to fifth seed and eventual champion Elena Rybakina. In doubles, she partnered Zhang Shuai to win her third Australian Open title, defeating Anna Danilina and Aleksandra Krunić in the final. As a result, she returned to the world No. 1 ranking in women's doubles on 2 February 2026.

At the Wimbledon Championships, Mertens defeated second seed and former champion Elena Rybakina 7–6(7–4), 6–1 in the third round, before overcoming Marie Bouzková in the fourth round to reach her first Wimbledon singles quarterfinal and first Grand Slam singles quarterfinal since 2020. She lost to Linda Nosková in the quarterfinals, 3–6, 5–7.

At the China Open in Beijing, Mertens defeated three consecutive Grand Slam singles champions to reach the semifinals. She overcame Jeļena Ostapenko before defeating third seed Coco Gauff 6–3, 6–3 in the fourth round, recording her first victory against Gauff in six meetings. She then defeated eighth seed Iga Świątek 7–6(7–0), 6–3 in the quarterfinals, securing her first victory over Świątek and advancing to her first WTA 1000 singles semifinal since 2021. Her run ended with a 5–7, 2–6 defeat to Zheng Qinwen in the semifinals.

== Playing style ==
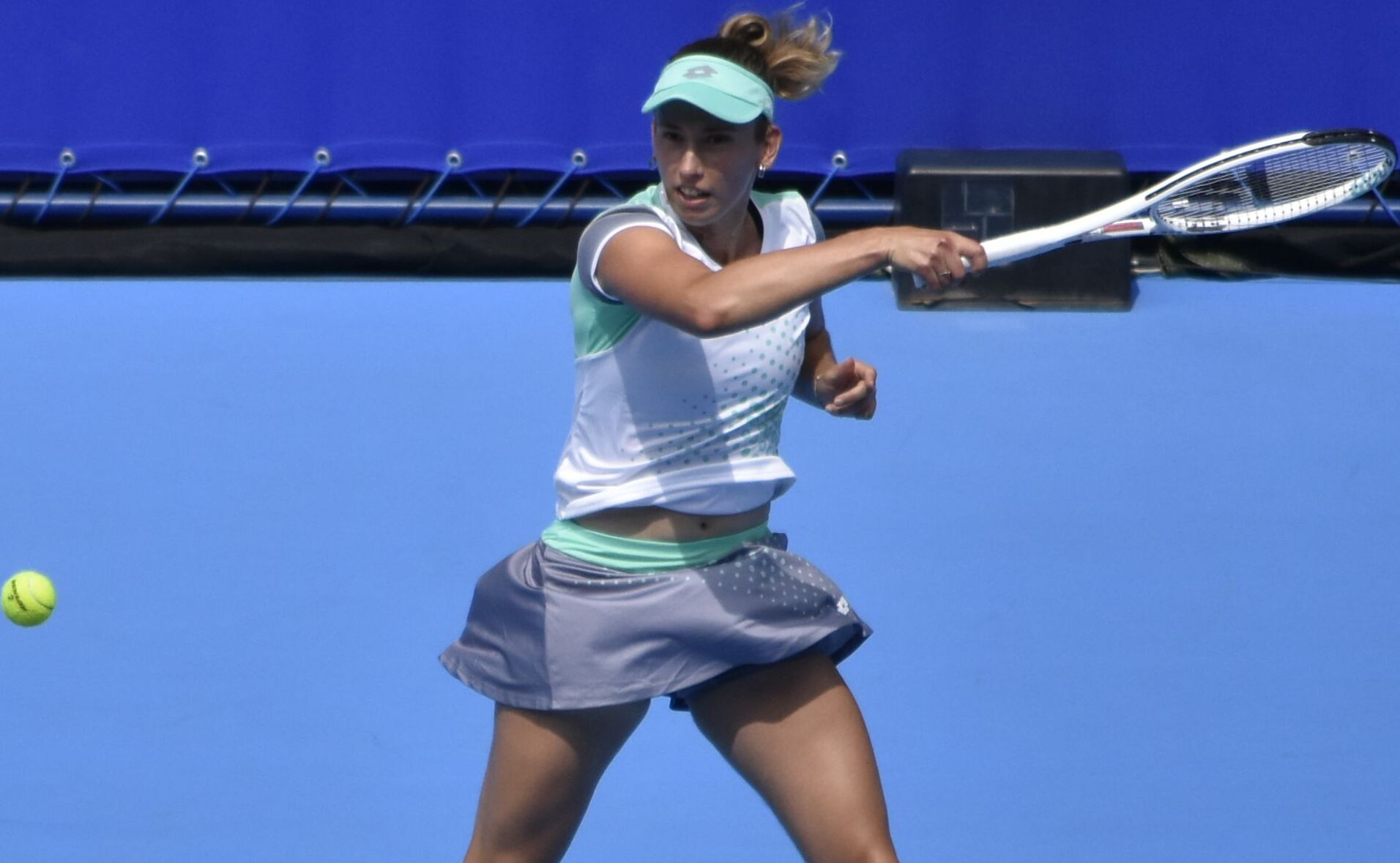
Mertens hitting a forehand

Mertens is a baseline player, whose game blends her excellent defensive skills with aggressive shot making capabilities. Her groundstrokes are hit flat, with little topspin, allowing her shots to penetrate consistently deep into the court despite Mertens' comparatively slight build. Although both her groundstrokes are reliable, her backhand is stronger, and is responsible for the majority of winners she accumulates on the court; she particularly excels at redirecting power down the line with her backhand. When in good form, Mertens hits a significant number of winners, but this can be accompanied by a large number of unforced errors. One of Mertens' major weapons is her return of serve, hitting many return winners, and effectively neutralising powerful first serves. Mertens' serve is strong, with her first serve peaking at 119 mph (192 km/h) and averaging at 99 mph (159 km/h), allowing her to serve multiple aces in any match; her first serve isn't reliable, however, with her first serve percentage typically averaging 58%. To minimise double faults, however, Mertens possesses an effective second serve, which has a tremendous amount of kick, averaging 79 mph (127 km/h); this also prevents opponents from scoring free points off her second serve. Due to her increasing doubles experience, Mertens is a highly effective net player, and frequently chooses to finish points at the net. Mertens' superlative fitness, stamina, speed, footwork, and court coverage allow her to excel at counterpunching, and extend points until she creates the opportunity to hit low-risk winners; as such, she is one of the most effective players on the WTA Tour at turning defence into offence, due to her excellent point construction. Mertens possesses extreme mental toughness, and has been noted for her consistency and determination on court, making her a formidable opponent. Mertens has stated that her favourite surface is grass, but the majority of her success has come on hard courts.

== Career statistics ==
=== Grand Slam performance timelines ===
Key
W	F	SF	QF	#R	RR	Q#	DNQ	A	NH

(W) winner; (F) finalist; (SF) semifinalist; (QF) quarterfinalist; (#R) rounds 4, 3, 2, 1; (RR) round-robin stage; (Q#) qualification round; (DNQ) did not qualify; (A) absent; (NH) not held; (SR) strike rate (events won / competed); (W–L) win–loss record.
To avoid confusion and double counting, these charts are updated at the conclusion of a tournament or when the player's participation has ended.

==== Singles ====
Tournament	2015	2016	2017	2018	2019	2020	2021	2022	2023	2024	2025	2026	SR	W–L	Win%
Australian Open	A	Q2	A	SF	3R	4R	4R	4R	3R	2R	2R	4R	0 / 9	23–9	72%
French Open	A	Q3	3R	4R	3R	3R	3R	4R	4R	3R	1R	2R	0 / 10	20–10	67%
Wimbledon	Q3	Q2	1R	3R	4R	NH	3R	4R	2R	2R	4R	QF	0 / 8	19–8	70%
US Open	Q1	1R	1R	4R	QF	QF	4R	1R	3R	4R	3R	3R	0 / 10	21–10	68%
Win–loss	0–0	0–1	2–3	13–4	11–4	9–3	10–4	9–4	8–4	7–4	6–4	8–2	0 / 37	83–37	69%

==== Doubles ====
Tournament	2015	2016	2017	2018	2019	2020	2021	2022	2023	2024	2025	2026	SR	W–L	Win%
Australian Open	A	A	2R	1R	3R	QF	W	SF	QF	W	2R	W	3 / 10	31–7	82%
French Open	A	A	1R	1R	SF	2R	3R	3R	3R	2R	QF	3R	0 / 10	17–10	63%
Wimbledon	A	2R	3R	3R	QF	NH	W	F	F	SF	W	2R	2 / 10	34-8	83%
US Open	A	A	2R	QF	W	QF	QF	2R	1R	1R	SF	SF	1 / 9	21–8	72%
Win–loss	0–0	1–1	4–4	5–4	15–3	6–3	16–2	12–4	10–4	11–3	14–3	8–1	6 / 38	102–32	76%

=== Grand Slam tournaments finals ===
==== Doubles: 8 (6 titles, 2 runner-ups) ====
Result	Year	Championship	Surface	Partner	Opponents	Score
Win	2019	US Open	Hard	(Belarus) Aryna Sabalenka	(Belarus) Victoria Azarenka (Australia) Ashleigh Barty	7–5, 7–5
Win	2021	Australian Open	Hard	(Belarus) Aryna Sabalenka	(Czech Republic) Barbora Krejčíková (Czech Republic) Kateřina Siniaková	6–2, 6–3
Win	2021	Wimbledon	Grass	(Chinese Taipei) Hsieh Su-wei	(Russia) Veronika Kudermetova (Russia) Elena Vesnina	3–6, 7–5, 9–7
Loss	2022	Wimbledon	Grass	(China) Zhang Shuai	(Czech Republic) Barbora Krejčíková (Czech Republic) Kateřina Siniaková	2–6, 4–6
Loss	2023	Wimbledon	Grass	(Australia) Storm Hunter	(Chinese Taipei) Hsieh Su-wei (Czech Republic) Barbora Strýcová	5–7, 4–6
Win	2024	Australian Open (2)	Hard	(Chinese Taipei) Hsieh Su-wei	(Ukraine) Lyudmyla Kichenok (Latvia) Jeļena Ostapenko	6–1, 7–5
Win	2025	Wimbledon (2)	Grass	Veronika Kudermetova	(Chinese Taipei) Hsieh Su-wei (Latvia) Jeļena Ostapenko	3–6, 6–2, 6–4
Win	2026	Australian Open (3)	Hard	(China) Zhang Shuai	(Kazakhstan) Anna Danilina (Serbia) Aleksandra Krunić	7–6^{(7–4)}, 6–4

=== Year-end championships ===
==== Doubles: 3 (2 titles, 1 runner-up) ====
Result	Year	Championship	Surface	Partner	Opponents	Score
Loss	2021	WTA Finals, Mexico	Hard	(Chinese Taipei) Hsieh Su-wei	(Czech Republic) Barbora Krejčíková (Czech Republic) Kateřina Siniaková	3–6, 4–6
Win	2022	WTA Finals, US	Hard (i)	Veronika Kudermetova	(Czech Republic) Barbora Krejčíková (Czech Republic) Kateřina Siniaková	6–2, 4–6, [11–9]
Win	2025	WTA Finals, Saudi Arabia (2)	Hard (i)	Veronika Kudermetova	(Hungary) Tímea Babos (Brazil) Luisa Stefani	7–6^{(7–4)}, 6–1
