= Kateřina Siniaková career statistics =

Czech tennis player career statistics

Career finals
Discipline	Type	Won	Lost	Total
Singles	Grand Slam	–	–	0
Singles	WTA Finals	–	–	0
Singles	WTA 1000 (Note: The WTA Premier 5 & Mandatory tournaments were reclassified as WTA 1000 tournaments in 2021.)	–	–	0
Singles	WTA 500 (Note: The WTA Premier tournaments were reclassified as WTA 500 tournaments in 2021.)	–	–	0
Singles	WTA 250 (Note: The WTA International tournaments were reclassified as WTA 250 tournaments in 2021.)	6	5	11
Singles	Olympics	–	–	0
Singles	Total	6	5	11
Doubles	Grand Slam	12	3	14
Doubles	WTA Finals	2	3	5
Doubles	WTA 1000	10	6	16
Doubles	WTA 500	7	4	11
Doubles	WTA 250	8	5	13
Doubles	Olympics	1	0	1
Doubles	Total	40	21	61

This is a list of the main career statistics of professional Czech tennis player Kateřina Siniaková.

== Career achievements ==
Siniaková in 2025.

To date, Siniaková has won six singles and thirty nine doubles titles on the WTA Tour, including twelve Grand Slam titles: Australian Open (2022, 2023, 2025), French Open (2018, 2021, 2024, 2026), Wimbledon Championships (2018, 2022, 2024) and US Open (2022, 2026). Many of these achievements she accomplished alongside alongside countrymate Barbora Krejčíková. By winning the 2022 US Open, she collected all grand slams ("Career Grand Slam"). In the same time, she achieved "Career Golden Slam" and "Career Super Slam", thanks to previously winning gold at the 2020 Summer Tokyo Olympics and 2021 WTA Finals. Achieving all of this alongside Krejčíková, they became the second women's pair (and the third and fourth women overall, after Gigi Fernández and Pam Shriver) to complete this goal.

From 2024, Siniaková did not compete alongside Krejčíková; furthermore, in the following years, 2025 and 2026, she won an additional five Grand Slam titles—one with Coco Gauff (2024 French Open) and four with Taylor Townsend (2024 Wimbledon, 2025 Australian Open, 2026 French Open, and 2026 US Open), with whom she completed the Career Grand Slam for the second time in her career. With Townsend she also won 2026 WTA Finals.

Beside Grand Slam success, in doubles she also won the WTA Finals in 2021 and 2026, ten WTA 1000. The rundown is listed below.

Despite having less success in singles, she still left her mark. Her most significant results are two quarterfinals at the China Open and Wuhan Open in 2018. At Grand Slam tournaments, she reached the round of 16 at the 2019 French Open, where she also defeated world No. 1, Naomi Osaka, to make her biggest win so far. She also became the No. 1 doubles player on 22 October 2018, while she achieved a career-high singles ranking of world No. 31 on the same day. ,the highest singles ranking that she achieved is No. 27 in 2024, also she won six WTA 250 events.

== Performance timelines ==
Key
W	F	SF	QF	#R	RR	Q#	P#	DNQ	A	Z#	PO	G	S	B	NMS	NTI	P	NH

(W) winner; (F) finalist; (SF) semifinalist; (QF) quarterfinalist; (#R) rounds 4, 3, 2, 1; (RR) round-robin stage; (Q#) qualification round; (P#) preliminary round; (DNQ) did not qualify; (A) absent; (Z#) Davis/Fed Cup Zonal Group (with number indication) or (PO) play-off; (G) gold, (S) silver or (B) bronze Olympic/Paralympic medal; (NMS) not a Masters tournament; (NTI) not a Tier I tournament; (P) postponed; (NH) not held; (SR) strike rate (events won / competed); (W–L) win–loss record.
To avoid confusion and double counting, these charts are updated at the conclusion of a tournament or when the player's participation has ended.

Only main-draw results in WTA Tour, Grand Slam tournaments, Billie Jean King Cup (Fed Cup), United Cup, Hopman Cup and Olympic Games are included in win–loss records.

=== Singles ===
Current through the 2026 Japan Women's Open.

Tournament	2013	2014	2015	2016	2017	2018	2019	2020	2021	2022	2023	2024	2025	2026	SR	W–L	Win %
Australian Open	A	1R	2R	1R	1R	2R	1R	1R	1R	1R	1R	2R	1R	2R	0 / 13	4–13	24%
French Open	A	Q2	1R	1R	1R	3R	4R	3R	3R	2R	1R	2R	1R	2R	0 / 12	12–12	50%
Wimbledon	A	Q1	1R	3R	1R	3R	2R	NH	3R	1R	2R	2R	2R	2R	0 / 11	11–11	50%
US Open	A	Q3	1R	2R	1R	3R	1R	1R	2R	2R	1R	1R	1R	2R	0 / 12	6–12	33%
Win–Loss	0–0	0–1	1–4	3–4	0–4	7–4	4–4	2–3	5–4	2–4	1–4	3–4	1–4	4–4	0 / 48	33–48	41%
National representation
Summer Olympics	Not Held			A	Not Held				A	Not Held			1R	NH	0 / 1	0–1	0%
Billie Jean King Cup (Note: Formerly known as Fed Cup until 2020.)	A	A	A	A	SF	W	QF	RR (Note: Edition is split into the two years due to COVID-19.)		SF	SF	QF	A	W	2 / 8	5–3	63%
WTA 1000 tournaments
Qatar Open	A	A	NTI	Q2	NTI	1R	NTI	1R	NTI	1R	NTI	3R	A	2R	0 / 5	3–5	38%
Dubai Championships	NTI		1R	NTI	1R	NTI	2R	NTI	1R	NTI	A	1R	1R	1R	0 / 7	1–7	13%
Indian Wells Open	A	A	2R	1R	3R	2R	1R	NH	2R	2R	2R	2R	3R	4R	0 / 11	13–11	54%
Miami Open	1R	A	1R	Q1	1R	1R	2R	NH	1R	3R	1R	2R	2R	1R	0 / 11	5–11	31%
Madrid Open	A	A	A	1R	2R	1R	1R	NH	Q1	2R	A	1R	1R	3R	0 / 8	4–8	33%
Italian Open	A	A	1R	A	2R	Q2	2R	2R	A	A	A	2R	1R	2R	0 / 7	5–7	42%
Canadian Open	A	A	A	A	2R	1R	2R	NH	3R	A	1R	A	A	2R	0 / 6	4–6	40%
Cincinnati Open	A	A	A	A	1R	1R	1R	1R	A	Q1	1R	1R	A	3R	0 / 7	1–7	13%
China Open	A	A	A	1R	1R	QF	3R	Not Held			1R	1R	1R	2R	0 / 8	6–8	43%
Wuhan Open	NH	A	A	2R	2R	QF	1R	Not Held				2R	QF	1R	0 / 7	9–7	56%
Guadalajara Open	Not Held									2R	A	Not Tier I			0 / 1	1–1	50%
Win–Loss	0–1	0–0	1–4	1–4	6–9	7–8	6–9	1–3	3–4	5–5	1–5	6–9	6–7	9–10	0 / 78	52–78	40%
Career statistics
	2013	2014	2015	2016	2017	2018	2019	2020	2021	2022	2023	2024	2025	2026	SR	W–L	Win %
Tournaments	1	6	20	19	25	22	28	13	17	20	19	26	21	19	Career total: 256		
Titles	0	0	0	0	2	0	0	0	0	1	2	0	0	1	Career total: 6		
Finals	0	0	0	2	2	1	0	0	1	1	3	0	0	1	Career total: 11		
Hard Win–Loss	0–1	4–5	6–12	9–11	12–14	19–14	10–19	1–9	9–12	12–11	15–15	17–17	14–13	14–11	4 / 166	142–164	46%
Clay Win–Loss	0–0	0–1	4–5	6–5	11–7	7–6	9–7	5–4	7–3	6–5	0–1	4–6	0–4	4–4	1 / 58	63–58	52%
Grass Win–Loss	0–0	0–0	3–3	2–3	1–3	2–2	1–3	0–0	6–2	0–3	6–2	5–2	3–4	2–3	1 / 32	31–30	51%
Overall Win–Loss	0–1	4–6	13–20	17–19	24–24	28–22	20–29	6–13	22–17	18–19	21–18	26–25	17–21	20–18	6 / 256	236–252	48%
Win %	0%	40%	39%	47%	50%	56%	41%	32%	56%	49%	55%	54%	38%	53%	Career total: 48%		
Year-end ranking	211	74	108	49	47	31	58	64	49	47	45	46	49		$18,348,864		

=== Doubles ===
Current to the 2026 Wuhan Open.

Tournament	2014	2015	2016	2017	2018	2019	2020	2021	2022	2023	2024	2025	2026	SR	W–L	Win%
Grand Slam tournaments
Australian Open	A	1R	1R	1R	3R	QF	SF	F	W	W	SF	W	QF	3 / 12	38–9	81%
French Open	A	3R	SF	SF	W	1R	SF	W	A	1R	W	QF	W	4 / 11	41–7	85%
Wimbledon	A	2R	1R	3R	W	SF	NH	QF	W	A	W	SF	QF	3 / 10	33–7	83%
US Open	A	1R	QF	F	SF	1R	2R	1R	W	2R	SF	F	W	2 / 12	34–10	77%
Win–Loss	0–0	3–4	7–4	11–4	18–2	7–4	9–3	12–3	18–0	7–2	19–2	18–3	17–2	12 / 45	146–33	82%
Year-end championships
WTA Finals	Did Not Qualify				F	RR	NH	W	F	RR	F	SF	W	2 / 8	24–9	73%
National representation
Summer Olympics	Not Held		A	Not Held				G	Not Held		QF	Not Held		1 / 2	7–1	88%
WTA 1000 tournaments
Qatar Open	A	NTI	1R	NTI	SF	NTI	SF	NTI	QF	NTI	A	A	2R	0 / 5	7–5	58%
Dubai Championships	NTI	2R	NTI	1R	NTI	QF	NTI	QF	NTI	A	W	W	QF	2 / 7	12–5	71%
Indian Wells Open	A	A	1R	F	2R	F	NH	QF	1R	W	F	SF	W	2 / 10	28–8	78%
Miami Open	A	1R	1R	1R	F	1R	NH	2R	A	A	A	SF	W	1 / 8	13–7	65%
Madrid Open	A	A	2R	QF	2R	QF	NH	W	2R	A	A	A	W	2 / 7	15–5	75%
Italian Open	A	A	A	QF	1R	SF	QF	QF	A	A	QF	1R	SF	0 / 8	11–8	58%
Canadian Open	A	A	A	1R	2R	W	NH	A	A	2R	A	A	W	2 / 5	8–3	63%
Cincinnati Open	A	A	A	1R	QF	QF	1R	SF	2R	QF	QF	A	2R	0 / 9	6–9	40%
China Open	A	A	2R	QF	2R	2R	Not Held			2R	1R	A	F	0 / 7	9–7	45%
Wuhan Open	A	A	QF	2R	1R	1R	Not Held				SF	W	F	1 / 7	13–6	68%
Guadalajara Open	Not Held								SF	A	Not Tier I			0 / 1	2–1	67%
Win–Loss	0–0	1–2	4–6	11–9	11–9	13–8	4–3	11–5	4–5	5–3	14–5	13–3	33–6	10 / 74	124–64	66%
Career statistics
	2014	2015	2016	2017	2018	2019	2020	2021	2022	2023	2024	2025	2026	SR	W–L	Win %
Tournaments	5	16	18	21	17	19	10	15	13	12	18	15	15	Career total: 195		
Titles	1	1	0	0	2	3	1	6	6	3	5	4	8	Career total: 40		
Finals	2	2	0	5	5	4	2	7	7	5	7	5	10	Career total: 61		
Hard Win–Loss	8–3	8–10	11–11	18–13	21–11	25–14	16–5	32–8	30–5	23–9	30–9	36–7	42–7	28 / 134	300–112	73%
Clay Win–Loss	0–1	7–2	7–6	15–7	8–3	3–3	8–3	11–1	1–1	0–1	13–2	3–2	13–1	8 / 41	89–33	73%
Grass Win–Loss	0–0	1–2	0–1	2–3	8–1	4–1	NH	1–1	10–0	3–2	7–2	4–2	3–1	4 / 19	43–16	73%
Overall Win–Loss	8–4	16–14	18–18	35–23	37–15	32–18	24–8	44–10	41–6	26–12	50–13	43–11	58–9	40 / 195	432–160	73%
Year-end ranking	86	58	35	13	1	7	8	1	1	10	1	1	1			

=== Mixed doubles ===
Tournament	2016	2017	2018	...	2022	2023	2024	2025	2026	SR	W–L	Win%
Australian Open	A	2R	A		1R	A	A	1R	QF	0 / 4	3–3	50%
French Open	A	A	1R		A	A	1R	1R	A	0 / 3	0–3	0%
Wimbledon	2R	A	A		A	A	A	W	A	1 / 2	6–1	86%
US Open	A	A	A		A	1R	2R	A	QF	0 / 3	2–3	40%
Win–Loss	1–1	1–0	0–1		0–1	0–1	1–2	5–2	3–2	1 / 12	11–10	52%

== Grand Slam tournaments finals ==
=== Doubles: 15 (12 titles, 3 runner-ups) ===
Result	Year	Tournament	Surface	Partner	Opponents	Score
Loss	2017	US Open	Hard	(Czech Republic) Lucie Hradecká	(Chinese Taipei) Chan Yung-jan (Switzerland) Martina Hingis	3–6, 2–6
Win	2018	French Open	Clay	(Czech Republic) Barbora Krejčíková	(Japan) Eri Hozumi (Japan) Makoto Ninomiya	6–3, 6–3
Win	2018	Wimbledon	Grass	(Czech Republic) Barbora Krejčíková	(United States) Nicole Melichar (Czech Republic) Květa Peschke	6–4, 4–6, 6–0
Loss	2021	Australian Open	Hard	(Czech Republic) Barbora Krejčíková	(Belgium) Elise Mertens (Belarus) Aryna Sabalenka	2–6, 3–6
Win	2021	French Open (2)	Clay	(Czech Republic) Barbora Krejčíková	(United States) Bethanie Mattek-Sands (Poland) Iga Świątek	6–4, 6–2
Win	2022	Australian Open	Hard	(Czech Republic) Barbora Krejčíková	(Kazakhstan) Anna Danilina (Brazil) Beatriz Haddad Maia	6–7^{(3–7)}, 6–4, 6–4
Win	2022	Wimbledon (2)	Grass	(Czech Republic) Barbora Krejčíková	(Belgium) Elise Mertens (China) Zhang Shuai	6–2, 6–4
Win	2022	US Open	Hard	(Czech Republic) Barbora Krejčíková	(United States) Caty McNally (United States) Taylor Townsend	3–6, 7–5, 6–1
Win	2023	Australian Open (2)	Hard	(Czech Republic) Barbora Krejčíková	(Japan) Shuko Aoyama (Japan) Ena Shibahara	6–4, 6–3
Win	2024	French Open (3)	Clay	(United States) Coco Gauff	(Italy) Sara Errani (Italy) Jasmine Paolini	7–6^{(7–5)}, 6–3
Win	2024	Wimbledon (3)	Grass	(United States) Taylor Townsend	(Canada) Gabriela Dabrowski (New Zealand) Erin Routliffe	7–6^{(7–5)}, 7–6^{(7–1)}
Win	2025	Australian Open (3)	Hard	(United States) Taylor Townsend	(Chinese Taipei) Hsieh Su-wei (Latvia) Jeļena Ostapenko	6–2, 6–7^{(4–7)}, 6–3
Loss	2025	US Open	Hard	(United States) Taylor Townsend	(New Zealand) Erin Routliffe (Canada) Gabriela Dabrowski	4–6, 4–6
Win	2026	French Open (4)	Clay	(United States) Taylor Townsend	(Kazakhstan) Anna Danilina (Serbia) Aleksandra Krunic	6–2, 7–5
Win	2026	US Open (2)	Hard	(United States) Taylor Townsend	(United States) Ashlyn Krueger (United States) Robin Montgomery	5–7, 6–0, 6–2

=== Mixed doubles: 1 (1 title) ===
Result	Year	Tournament	Surface	Partner	Opponents	Score
Win	2025	Wimbledon	Grass	(Netherlands) Sem Verbeek	(Brazil) Luisa Stefani (United Kingdom) Joe Salisbury	7–6^{(7–3)}, 7–6^{(7–3)}

== Other significant finals ==
=== Year-end championships ===
==== Doubles: 5 (2 titles, 3 runner-ups) ====
Result	Year	Tournament	Surface	Partner	Opponents	Score
Loss	2018	WTA Finals, Singapore	Hard (i)	(Czech Republic) Barbora Krejčíková	(Hungary) Tímea Babos (France) Kristina Mladenovic	4–6, 5–7
Win	2021	WTA Finals, Mexico	Hard	(Czech Republic) Barbora Krejčíková	(Chinese Taipei) Hsieh Su-wei (Belgium) Elise Mertens	6–3, 6–4
Loss	2022	WTA Finals, United States	Hard (i)	(Czech Republic) Barbora Krejčíková	Veronika Kudermetova (Belgium) Elise Mertens	2–6, 6–4, [9–11]
Loss	2024	WTA Finals, Saudi Arabia	Hard (i)	(United States) Taylor Townsend	(Canada) Gabriela Dabrowski (New Zealand) Erin Routliffe	5–7, 3–6
Win	2026	WTA Finals, United States	Hard	(United States) Taylor Townsend	(Italy) Sara Errani (Italy) Jasmine Paolini	6–4, 6–3

=== WTA 1000 tournaments ===
==== Doubles: 16 (10 titles, 6 runner-ups) ====
Result	Year	Tournament	Surface	Partner	Opponents	Score
Loss	2017	Indian Wells Open	Hard	(Czech Republic) Lucie Hradecká	(Chinese Taipei) Chan Yung-jan (Switzerland) Martina Hingis	6–7^{(4–7)}, 2–6
Loss	2018	Miami Open	Hard	(Czech Republic) Barbora Krejčíková	(Australia) Ashleigh Barty (United States) CoCo Vandeweghe	2–6, 1–6
Loss	2019	Indian Wells Open	Hard	(Czech Republic) Barbora Krejčíková	(Belgium) Elise Mertens (Belarus) Aryna Sabalenka	3–6, 2–6
Win	2019	Canadian Open	Hard	(Czech Republic) Barbora Krejčíková	(Germany) Anna-Lena Grönefeld (Netherlands) Demi Schuurs	7–5, 6–0
Win	2021	Madrid Open	Clay	(Czech Republic) Barbora Krejčíková	(Canada) Gabriela Dabrowski (Netherlands) Demi Schuurs	6–4, 6–3
Win	2023	Indian Wells Open	Hard	(Czech Republic) Barbora Krejčíková	(Brazil) Beatriz Haddad Maia (Germany) Laura Siegemund	6–1, 6–7^{(3–7)}, [10–7]
Win	2024	Dubai Championships	Hard	(Australia) Storm Hunter	(United States) Nicole Melichar-Martinez (Australia) Ellen Perez	6–4, 6–2
Loss	2024	Indian Wells Open	Hard	(Australia) Storm Hunter	(Chinese Taipei) Hsieh Su-wei (Belgium) Elise Mertens	3–6, 4–6
Win	2025	Dubai Championships (2)	Hard	(United States) Taylor Townsend	(Chinese Taipei) Hsieh Su-wei (Latvia) Jelena Ostapenko	7–6^{(7–5)}, 6–4
Win	2025	Wuhan Open	Hard	(Australia) Storm Hunter	(Kazakhstan) Anna Danilina (Serbia) Aleksandra Krunić	6–3, 6–2
Win	2026	Indian Wells Open (2)	Hard	(United States) Taylor Townsend	(Kazakhstan) Anna Danilina (Serbia) Aleksandra Krunić	7–6^{(7–4)}, 6–4
Win	2026	Miami Open	Hard	(United States) Taylor Townsend	(Italy) Sara Errani (Italy) Jasmine Paolini	7–6^{(7–0)}, 6–1
Win	2026	Madrid Open (2)	Clay	(United States) Taylor Townsend	Mirra Andreeva; Diana Shnaider	7–6^{(7–2)}, 6–2
Win	2026	Canadian Open (2)	Hard	(China) Zhang Shuai	(Italy) Sara Errani (United States) Nicole Melichar-Martinez	6–3, 6–4
Loss	2026	China Open	Hard	(China) Zhang Shuai	(Brazil) Luisa Stefani (Canada) Gabriela Dabrowski	1–6, 2–6
Loss	2026	Wuhan Open	Hard	(Australia) Storm Hunter	(Brazil) Luisa Stefani (Canada) Gabriela Dabrowski	5–7, 4–6

=== Summer Olympics ===
==== Doubles: 1 (1 gold) ====
Result	Year	Tournament	Surface	Partner	Opponents	Score
Gold	2021	Tokyo Olympics	Hard	(Czech Republic) Barbora Krejčíková	(Switzerland) Belinda Bencic (Switzerland) Viktorija Golubic	7–5, 6–1

==== Mixed doubles: 1 (1 gold) ====
Result	Year	Tournament	Surface	Partner	Opponents	Score
Gold	2024	Paris Olympics	Clay	(Czech Republic) Tomáš Macháč	(China) Wang Xinyu (China) Zhang Zhizhen	6–2, 5–7, [10–8]

== WTA Tour finals ==
=== Singles: 11 (6 titles, 5 runner-ups) ===
Legend International / WTA 250 (6–5)	Finals by surface Hard (4–3) Clay (1–1) Grass (1–1)	Finals by setting Outdoor (6–5)

Result	W–L	Date	Tournament	Tier	Surface	Opponent	Score
Loss	0–1	Jul 2016	Swedish Open, Sweden	International	Clay	(Germany) Laura Siegemund	5–7, 1–6
Loss	0–2	Sep 2016	Japan Women's Open, Japan	International	Hard	(United States) Christina McHale	6–3, 4–6, 4–6
Win	1–2	Jan 2017	Shenzhen Open, China	International	Hard	(United States) Alison Riske	6–3, 6–4
Win	2–2	Jul 2017	Swedish Open, Sweden	International	Clay	(Denmark) Caroline Wozniacki	6–3, 6–4
Loss	2–3	Jan 2018	Shenzhen Open, China	International	Hard	(Romania) Simona Halep	1–6, 6–2, 0–6
Loss	2–4	Jun 2021	Bad Homburg Open, Germany	WTA 250	Grass	(Germany) Angelique Kerber	3–6, 2–6
Win	3–4	Sep 2022	Slovenia Open, Slovenia	WTA 250	Hard	(Kazakhstan) Elena Rybakina	6–7^{(4–7)}, 7–6^{(7–5)}, 6–4
Win	4–4	Jun 2023	Bad Homburg Open, Germany	WTA 250	Grass	(Italy) Lucia Bronzetti	6–2, 7–6^{(7–5)}
Loss	4–5	Oct 2023	Hong Kong Open, China SAR	WTA 250	Hard	(Canada) Leylah Fernandez	6–3, 4–6, 4–6
Win	5–5	Oct 2023	Jiangxi Open, China	WTA 250	Hard	(Czech Republic) Marie Bouzková	1–6, 7–6^{(7–5)}, 7–6^{(7–4)}
Win	6–5	Oct 2026	Japan Women's Open, Japan	WTA 250	Hard	(United States) Ashlyn Krueger	6–1, 6–0

=== Doubles: 61 (40 titles, 21 runner-ups) ===
Legend Grand Slam (12–3) Olympics (1–0) WTA Finals (2–3) Premier 5 & Premier M / WTA 1000 (10–6) Premier / WTA 500 (7–4) International / WTA 250 (8–5)	Finals by surface Hard (28–18) Clay (8–2) Grass (4–1)	Finals by setting Outdoor (38–17) Indoor (2–4)

Result	W–L	Date	Tournament	Tier	Surface	Partner	Opponents	Score
Loss	0–1	Aug 2014	Stanford Classic, United States	Premier	Hard	(Poland) Paula Kania	(Spain) Garbiñe Muguruza (Spain) Carla Suárez Navarro	2–6, 6–4, [5–10]
Win	1–1	Sep 2014	Tashkent Open, Uzbekistan	International	Hard	(Serbia) Aleksandra Krunić	(Russia) Margarita Gasparyan (Russia) Alexandra Panova	6–2, 6–1
Win	2–1	May 2015	Prague Open, Czech Republic	International	Clay	(Switzerland) Belinda Bencic	(Ukraine) Kateryna Bondarenko (Czech Republic) Eva Hrdinová	6–2, 6–2
Loss	2–2	Sep 2015	Tashkent Open, Uzbekistan	International	Hard	(Russia) Vera Dushevina	(Russia) Margarita Gasparyan (Russia) Alexandra Panova	1–6, 6–3, [3–10]
Loss	2–3	Feb 2017	Taiwan Open, Taiwan	International	Hard	(Czech Republic) Lucie Hradecká	(Chinese Taipei) Chan Hao-ching (Chinese Taipei) Chan Yung-jan	4–6, 2–6
Loss	2–4	Mar 2017	Indian Wells Open, United States	Premier M	Hard	(Czech Republic) Lucie Hradecká	(Chinese Taipei) Chan Yung-jan (Switzerland) Martina Hingis	6–7^{(4–7)}, 2–6
Loss	2–5	Apr 2017	Charleston Open, United States	Premier	Clay	(Czech Republic) Lucie Hradecká	(United States) Bethanie Mattek-Sands (Czech Republic) Lucie Šafářová	1–6, 6–4, [7–10]
Loss	2–6	May 2017	Prague Open, Czech Republic	International	Clay	(Czech Republic) Lucie Hradecká	(Germany) Anna-Lena Grönefeld (Czech Republic) Květa Peschke	4–6, 6–7^{(3–7)}
Loss	2–7	Sep 2017	US Open, United States	Grand Slam	Hard	(Czech Republic) Lucie Hradecká	(Chinese Taipei) Chan Yung-jan (Switzerland) Martina Hingis	3–6, 2–6
Loss	2–8	Jan 2018	Shenzhen Open, China	International	Hard	(Czech Republic) Barbora Krejčíková	(Romania) Simona Halep (Romania) Irina-Camelia Begu	6–1, 1–6, [8–10]
Loss	2–9	Apr 2018	Miami Open, United States	Premier M	Hard	(Czech Republic) Barbora Krejčíková	(Australia) Ashleigh Barty (United States) CoCo Vandeweghe	2–6, 1–6
Win	3–9	Jun 2018	French Open, France	Grand Slam	Clay	(Czech Republic) Barbora Krejčíková	(Japan) Eri Hozumi (Japan) Makoto Ninomiya	6–3, 6–3
Win	4–9	July 2018	Wimbledon, United Kingdom	Grand Slam	Grass	(Czech Republic) Barbora Krejčíková	(United States) Nicole Melichar (Czech Republic) Květa Peschke	6–4, 4–6, 6–0
Loss	4–10	Oct 2018	WTA Finals, Singapore	WTA Finals	Hard (i)	(Czech Republic) Barbora Krejčíková	(Hungary) Tímea Babos (France) Kristina Mladenovic	4–6, 5–7
Win	5–10	Jan 2019	Sydney International, Australia	Premier	Hard	(Serbia) Aleksandra Krunić	(Japan) Eri Hozumi (Poland) Alicja Rosolska	6–1, 7–6^{(7–3)}
Loss	5–11	Mar 2019	Indian Wells Open, United States	Premier M	Hard	(Czech Republic) Barbora Krejčíková	(Belgium) Elise Mertens (Belarus) Aryna Sabalenka	3–6, 2–6
Win	6–11	Aug 2019	Canadian Open, Canada	Premier 5	Hard	(Czech Republic) Barbora Krejčíková	(Germany) Anna-Lena Grönefeld (Netherlands) Demi Schuurs	7–5, 6–0
Win	7–11	Oct 2019	Ladies Linz, Austria	International	Hard (i)	(Czech Republic) Barbora Krejčíková	(Austria) Barbara Haas (Switzerland) Xenia Knoll	6–4, 6–3
Win	8–11	Jan 2020	Shenzhen Open, China	International	Hard	(Czech Republic) Barbora Krejčíková	(China) Zheng Saisai (China) Duan Yingying	6–2, 3–6, [10–4]
Loss	8–12	Nov 2020	Ladies Linz, Austria	International	Hard (i)	(Czech Republic) Lucie Hradecká	(Netherlands) Arantxa Rus (Slovenia) Tamara Zidanšek	3–6, 4–6
Win	9–12	Feb 2021	Gippsland Trophy, Australia	WTA 500	Hard	(Czech Republic) Barbora Krejčíková	(Chinese Taipei) Chan Hao-ching (Chinese Taipei) Latisha Chan	6–3, 7–6^{(7–4)}
Loss	9–13	Feb 2021	Australian Open, Australia	Grand Slam	Hard	(Czech Republic) Barbora Krejčíková	(Belgium) Elise Mertens (Belarus) Aryna Sabalenka	2–6, 3–6
Win	10–13	May 2021	Madrid Open, Spain	WTA 1000	Clay	(Czech Republic) Barbora Krejčíková	(Canada) Gabriela Dabrowski (Netherlands) Demi Schuurs	6–4, 6–3
Win	11–13	Jun 2021	French Open, France (2)	Grand Slam	Clay	(Czech Republic) Barbora Krejčíková	(United States) Bethanie Mattek-Sands (Poland) Iga Świątek	6–4, 6–2
Win	12–13	Aug 2021	Tokyo Olympics, Japan	Olympics	Hard	(Czech Republic) Barbora Krejčíková	(Switzerland) Belinda Bencic (Switzerland) Viktorija Golubic	7–5, 6–1
Win	13–13	Oct 2021	Kremlin Cup, Russia	WTA 500	Hard (i)	(Latvia) Jeļena Ostapenko	(Ukraine) Nadiia Kichenok (Romania) Raluca Olaru	6–2, 4–6, [10–8]
Win	14–13	Nov 2021	WTA Finals, Mexico	WTA Finals	Hard	(Czech Republic) Barbora Krejčíková	(Chinese Taipei) Hsieh Su-wei (Belgium) Elise Mertens	6–3, 6–4
Win	15–13	Jan 2022	Melbourne Summer Set, Australia	WTA 250	Hard	(United States) Bernarda Pera	(Czech Republic) Tereza Martincová (Egypt) Mayar Sherif	6–2, 6–7^{(7–9)}, [10–5]
Win	16–13	Jan 2022	Australian Open, Australia	Grand Slam	Hard	(Czech Republic) Barbora Krejčíková	(Kazakhstan) Anna Danilina (Brazil) Beatriz Haddad Maia	6–7^{(3–7)}, 6–4, 6–4
Win	17–13	Jun 2022	German Open, Germany	WTA 500	Grass	(Australia) Storm Sanders	(France) Alizé Cornet (Switzerland) Jil Teichmann	6–4, 6–3
Win	18–13	Jul 2022	Wimbledon, United Kingdom (2)	Grand Slam	Grass	(Czech Republic) Barbora Krejčíková	(Belgium) Elise Mertens (China) Zhang Shuai	6–2, 6–4
Win	19–13	Sep 2022	US Open, United States	Grand Slam	Hard	(Czech Republic) Barbora Krejčíková	(United States) Caty McNally (United States) Taylor Townsend	3–6, 7–5, 6–1
Win	20–13	Oct 2022	Jasmin Open, Tunisia	WTA 250	Hard	(France) Kristina Mladenovic	(Japan) Miyu Kato (United States) Angela Kulikov	6–2, 6–0
Loss	20–14	Nov 2022	WTA Finals, United States	WTA Finals	Hard (i)	(Czech Republic) Barbora Krejčíková	Veronika Kudermetova (Belgium) Elise Mertens	2–6, 6–4, [9–11]
Loss	20–15	Jan 2023	Adelaide International, Australia	WTA 500	Hard	(Australia) Storm Hunter	(United States) Asia Muhammad (United States) Taylor Townsend	2–6, 6–7^{(2–7)}
Win	21–15	Jan 2023	Australian Open, Australia (2)	Grand Slam	Hard	(Czech Republic) Barbora Krejčíková	(Japan) Shuko Aoyama (Japan) Ena Shibahara	6–4, 6–3
Win	22–15	Mar 2023	Indian Wells Open, United States	WTA 1000	Hard	(Czech Republic) Barbora Krejčíková	(Brazil) Beatriz Haddad Maia (Germany) Laura Siegemund	6–1, 6–7^{(3–7)}, [10–7]
Loss	22–16	Jun 2023	German Open, Germany	WTA 500	Grass	(Czech Republic) Markéta Vondroušová	(France) Caroline Garcia (Brazil) Luisa Stefani	6–4, 6–7^{(8–10)}, [4–10]
Win	23–16	Sep 2023	Southern California Open, US	WTA 500	Hard	(Czech Republic) Barbora Krejčíková	(United States) Danielle Collins (United States) CoCo Vandeweghe	6–1, 6–4
Win	24–16	Feb 2024	Dubai Championships, UAE	WTA 1000	Hard	(Australia) Storm Hunter	(United States) Nicole Melichar-Martinez (Australia) Ellen Perez	6–4, 6–2
Loss	24–17	Mar 2024	Indian Wells Open, US	WTA 1000	Hard	(Australia) Storm Hunter	(Chinese Taipei) Hsieh Su-wei (Belgium) Elise Mertens	3–6, 4–6
Win	25–17	Jun 2024	French Open, France (3)	Grand Slam	Clay	(United States) Coco Gauff	(Italy) Sara Errani (Italy) Jasmine Paolini	7–6^{(7–5)}, 6–3
Win	26–17	Jul 2024	Wimbledon, United Kingdom (3)	Grand Slam	Grass	(United States) Taylor Townsend	(Canada) Gabriela Dabrowski (New Zealand) Erin Routliffe	7–6^{(7–5)}, 7–6^{(7–1)}
Win	27–17	Jul 2024	Prague Open, Czech Republic (2)	WTA 250	Clay	(Czech Republic) Barbora Krejčíková	(United States) Bethanie Mattek-Sands (Czech Republic) Lucie Šafářová	6–3, 6–3
Win	28–17	Oct 2024	Guangzhou Open, China	WTA 250	Hard	(China) Zhang Shuai	(Hungary) Fanny Stollár (Poland) Katarzyna Piter	6–4, 6–1
Loss	28–18	Nov 2024	WTA Finals, Saudi Arabia	WTA Finals	Hard (i)	(United States) Taylor Townsend	(Canada) Gabriela Dabrowski (New Zealand) Erin Routliffe	5–7, 3–6
Win	29–18	Jan 2025	Australian Open, Australia (3)	Grand Slam	Hard	(United States) Taylor Townsend	(Chinese Taipei) Hsieh Su-wei (Latvia)	6–2, 6–7^{(4–7)}, 6–3
Win	30–18	Feb 2025	Dubai Championships, UAE (2)	WTA 1000	Hard	(United States) Taylor Townsend	(Chinese Taipei) Hsieh Su-wei (Latvia) Jeļena Ostapenko	7–6^{(7–5)}, 6–4
Loss	30–19	Sep 2025	US Open, United States	Grand Slam	Hard	(United States) Taylor Townsend	(New Zealand) Erin Routliffe (Canada) Gabriela Dabrowski	4–6, 4–6
Win	31–19	Sep 2025	Korea Open, South Korea	WTA 500	Hard	(Czech Republic) Barbora Krejčíková	(United States) Caty McNally (Australia) Maya Joint	6–3, 7–6^{(8–6)}
Win	32–19	Oct 2025	Wuhan Open, China	WTA 1000	Hard	(Australia) Storm Hunter	(Kazakhstan) Anna Danilina (Serbia) Aleksandra Krunić	6–3, 6–2
Win	33–19	Jan 2026	Adelaide International, Australia	WTA 500	Hard	(China) Zhang Shuai	(Ukraine) Lyudmyla Kichenok (United States) Desirae Krawczyk	6–1, 6–4
Win	34–19	Mar 2026	Indian Wells Open, US (2)	WTA 1000	Hard	(United States) Taylor Townsend	(Kazakhstan) Anna Danilina (Serbia) Aleksandra Krunić	7–6^{(7–4)}, 6–4
Win	35–19	Mar 2026	Miami Open, US	WTA 1000	Hard	(United States) Taylor Townsend	(Italy) Sara Errani (Italy) Jasmine Paolini	7–6^{(7-0)}, 6–1
Win	36–19	Apr 2026	Madrid Open, Spain	WTA 1000	Clay	(United States) Taylor Townsend	Mirra Andreeva; Diana Shnaider	7–6^{(7–2)}, 6–2
Win	37–19	Jun 2026	French Open, France (4)	Grand Slam	Clay	(United States) Taylor Townsend	(Kazakhstan) Anna Danilina (Serbia) Aleksandra Krunic	6–2, 7–5
Win	38–19	Aug 2026	Candian Open, Canada (2)	WTA 1000	Hard	(China) Zhang Shuai	(Italy) Sara Errani (United States) Nicole Melichar-Martinez	6-3, 6–4
Win	39–19	Sep 2026	US Open, US (2)	Grand Slam	Hard	(United States) Taylor Townsend	(United States) Ashlyn Krueger (United States) Robin Montgomery	5–7, 6–0, 6–2
Loss	39–20	Oct 2026	China Open, China	WTA 1000	Hard	(China) Zhang Shuai	(Brazil) Luisa Stefani (Canada) Gabriela Dabrowski	1–6, 2–6
Loss	39–21	Oct 2026	Wuhan Open, China	WTA 1000	Hard	(Australia) Storm Hunter	(Brazil) Luisa Stefani (Canada) Gabriela Dabrowski	5–7, 4–6
Win	40–21	Nov 2026	WTA Finals, Indian Wells	WTA Finals	Hard (i)	(United States) Taylor Townsend	(Italy) Sara Errani (Italy) Jasmine Paolini	6–4, 6–3

== WTA 125 finals ==
=== Singles: 2 (2 titles) ===
Result	W–L	Date	Tournament	Surface	Opponent	Score
Win	1–0	May 2024	WTA 125 Lleida, Spain	Clay	(Egypt) Mayar Sherif	6–4, 4–6, 6–3
Win	2–0	Jul 2025	WTA 125 Warsaw, Poland	Hard	(Switzerland) Viktorija Golubic	6–1, 6–2

=== Doubles: 1 (title) ===
Result	Date	Tournament	Surface	Partner	Opponents	Score
Win	Nov 2014	WTA 125 Limoges, France	Hard (i)	(Czech Republic) Renata Voráčová	(Hungary) Tímea Babos (France) Kristina Mladenovic	2–6, 6–2, [10–5]

== ITF Circuit finals ==
=== Singles: 9 (8 titles, 1 runner–up) ===
Legend W100 tournaments (2–1) W50 tournaments (1–0) W25 tournaments (4–0) W10 tournaments (1–0)	Finals by surface Hard (3–1) Clay (3–0) Carpet (2–0)

Result	W–L	Date	Tournament	Tier	Surface	Opponent	Score
Win	1–0	Mar 2013	ITF Frauenfeld, Switzerland	W10	Carpet (i)	(Liechtenstein) Kathinka von Deichmann	6–3, 4–6, 6–4
Win	2–0	Aug 2013	ITF Westende, Belgium	W25	Hard	(Czech Republic) Kateřina Vaňková	6–1, 6–3
Win	3–0	Oct 2013	ITF Budapest, Hungary	W25	Clay	(Italy) Alberta Brianti	3–6, 6–2, 6–1
Win	4–0	Nov 2013	ITF Zawada, Poland	W25	Carpet (i)	(Germany) Nina Zander	6–1, 6–3
Win	5–0	Jun 2014	ITF Maribor, Slovenia	W25	Clay	(Austria) Yvonne Neuwirth	6–1, 7–5
Win	6–0	Nov 2014	ITF Nantes, France	W50+H	Hard (i)	(Tunisia) Ons Jabeur	7–5, 6–2
Win	7–0	May 2016	ITF Trnava, Slovakia	W100	Clay	(Latvia) Anastasija Sevastova	7–6^{(7–4)}, 5–7, 6–0
Loss	7–1	Dec 2020	ITF Dubai, UAE	W100	Hard	(Romania) Sorana Cîrstea	6–4, 3–6, 3–6
Win	8–1	Aug 2022	ITF Grodzisk Mazowiecki, Poland	W100	Hard	(Poland) Magda Linette	6–4, 6–1

=== Doubles: 7 (4 titles, 3 runner–ups) ===
Legend W75 tournaments (0–1) W50 tournaments (0–1) W25 tournaments (3–1) W10 tournaments (1–0)	Finals by surface Hard (0–1) Clay (4–2)

Result	W–L	Date	Tournament	Tier	Surface	Partner	Opponents	Score
Win	1–0	Jun 2012	ITF Jablonec nad Nisou, Czech Republic	W10	Clay	(Russia) Victoria Kan	(Czech Republic) Martina Borecká (Czech Republic) Petra Krejsová	6–4, 6–3
Win	2–0	Jun 2013	ITF Lenzerheide, Switzerland	W25	Clay	(Switzerland) Belinda Bencic	(Russia) Veronika Kudermetova (Latvia) Diāna Marcinkēviča	6–0, 6–2
Loss	2–1	Aug 2013	ITF Bad Saulgau, Germany	W25	Clay	(Czech Republic) Barbora Krejčíková	(Romania) Laura-Ioana Andrei (Romania) Elena Bogdan	7–6^{(13–11)}, 4–6, [8–10]
Win	3–1	Aug 2013	ITF Hechingen, Germany	W25	Clay	(Czech Republic) Barbora Krejčíková	(Romania) Laura-Ioana Andrei (France) Laura Thorpe	6–1, 6–4
Loss	3–2	Nov 2013	ITF Sharm El Sheikh, Egypt	W75+H	Clay	(Russia) Anna Morgina	(Switzerland) Timea Bacsinszky (Germany) Kristina Barrois	7–6^{(7–5)}, 0–6, [4–10]
Win	4–2	May 2014	ITF Maribor, Slovenia	W25	Clay	(Czech Republic) Barbora Krejčíková	(Netherlands) Cindy Burger (Chile) Daniela Seguel	6–0, 6–1
Loss	4–3	Nov 2015	ITF Nantes, France	W50	Hard (i)	(Czech Republic) Renata Voráčová	(Czech Republic) Lenka Kunčíková (Czech Republic) Karolína Stuchlá	4–6, 2–6

== Junior Grand Slam finals ==
=== Singles: 1 (runner–up) ===
Result	Year	Tournament	Surface	Opponent	Score
Loss	2013	Australian Open	Hard	(Croatia) Ana Konjuh	3–6, 4–6

=== Doubles: 3 (3 titles) ===
Result	Year	Tournament	Surface	Partner	Opponents	Score
Win	2013	French Open	Clay	(Czech Republic) Barbora Krejčíková	(Ecuador) Doménica González (Brazil) Beatriz Haddad Maia	7–5, 6–2
Win	2013	Wimbledon	Grass	(Czech Republic) Barbora Krejčíková	(Ukraine) Anhelina Kalinina (Belarus) Iryna Shymanovich	6–3, 6–1
Win	2013	US Open	Hard	(Czech Republic) Barbora Krejčíková	(Switzerland) Belinda Bencic (Spain) Sara Sorribes Tormo	6–3, 6–4

== WTA Tour career earnings ==
Current through the 2026 WTA Finals.

Year	Grand Slam titles	WTA titles	Total titles	Earnings ($)	Money list rank
2014	0	1	1	145,519	148
2015	0	1	1	358,870	86
2016	0	0	0	611,431	55
2017	0	2	2	1,072,694	35
2018	2	0	2	2,063,611	18
2019	0	3	3	1,350,132	29
2020	0	1	1	568,261	31
2021	1	5	6	1,244,914	25
2022	3	4	7	1,739,265	17
2023	1	4	5	1,204,460	30
2024	2	3	5	2,218,053	13
2025	2	3	6	2,146,427	19
2026	2	6	8	3,746,299	11
Career	13	33	46	18,690,649	35

- Title counts include singles, doubles and mixed doubles titles.

== Career Grand Slam statistics ==
=== Grand Slam tournament seedings ===
The tournaments won by Siniaková are in boldface, and advanced into final by Siniaková are in italics.

==== Doubles ====
Legend seeded No. 1 (**5** / 16) seeded No. 2 (**2** / 4) seeded No. 3 (**2** / 5) seeded No. 4–10 (**3** / 10) seeded No. 11–16 (0 / 2) unseeded (0 / 8)	Longest / total: 8 / 45; 1 / 45; 1 / 45; 4 / 45; 1 / 45; 7 / 45

Year	Australian Open	French Open	Wimbledon	US Open
2015	not seeded	not seeded	not seeded	not seeded
2016	not seeded	not seeded	not seeded	16th
2017	10th	6th	5th	7th (1)
2018	16th	**6th (1)**	**3rd (2)**	1st
2019	1st	1st	2nd	not seeded
2020	4th	4th	cancelled	8th
2021	3rd (2)	**2nd (3)**	1st	2nd
2022	**1st (4)**	~~1st~~ (Note: Krejčíková and Siniaková were seeded first but withdrew right before the tournament. This occurs twice, at the 2022 French Open and 2023 Wimbledon Championships.)	**2nd (5)**	**3rd (6)**
2023	**1st (7)**	1st	~~1st~~	1st
2024	3rd	**5th (8)**	**4th (9)**	3rd
2025	**1st (10)**	1st	1st	1st (3)
2026	1st	**1st (11)**	1st	**1st (12)**

==== Mixed doubles ====
Year	Australian Open	French Open	Wimbledon	US Open
2016	did not play	did not play	not seeded	did not play
2017	6th	did not play	did not play	did not play
2018	did not play	4th	did not play	did not play
...				
2022	wildcard	did not play	did not play	did not play
2023	did not play	did not play	did not play	not seeded
2024	did not play	not seeded	did not play	not seeded
2025	not seeded	8th	**not seeded (1)**	did not play

=== Best Grand Slam results details ===
Grand Slam winners are in boldface, and runner–ups are in italics.

Australian Open
2015 Australian (unseeded)
Round	Opponent	Rank	Score
1R	(Russia) Elena Vesnina	65	6–2, 7–5
2R	(Romania) Irina-Camelia Begu	42	5–7, 4–6
2018 Australian (unseeded)
Round	Opponent	Rank	Score
1R	(Greece) Maria Sakkari	55	6–2, 6–7^{(5–7)}, 6–4
2R	(Ukraine) Elina Svitolina (4)	4	6–4, 2–6, 1–6

Wimbledon Championships
2016 Wimbledon Championships (unseeded)
Round	Opponent	Rank	Score
1R	(France) Pauline Parmentier	89	6–3, 7–5
2R	(France) Caroline Garcia (30)	32	4–6, 6–4, 6–1
3R	(Poland) Agnieszka Radwańska (3)	3	3–6, 1–6
2018 Wimbledon Championships (unseeded)
Round	Opponent	Rank	Score
1R	(United States) Coco Vandeweghe (16)	16	6–7^{(3–7)}, 6–3, 8–6
2R	(Tunisia) Ons Jabeur (WC)	130	5–7, 6–4, 9–7
3R	(Italy) Camila Giorgi	52	6–3, 6–7^{(6–8)}, 2–6
2021 Wimbledon Championships (unseeded)
Round	Opponent	Rank	Score
1R	(China) Yafan Wang (LL)	123	6–1, 6–0
2R	(United States) Coco Vandeweghe	163	4–6, 6–2, 6–2
3R	**(Australia) Ashleigh Barty (1)**	1	3–6, 5–7

French Open
2019 French Open (unseeded)
Round	Opponent	Rank	Score
1R	(Kazakhstan) Elena Rybakina (Q)	141	7–6^{(7–5)}, 6–1
2R	(Greece) Maria Sakkari (29)	30	7–6^{(7–5)}, 6–7^{(8–10)}, 6–3
3R	(Japan) Naomi Osaka (1)	1	6–4, 6–2
4R	(United States) Madison Keys (14)	14	2–6, 4–6

US Open
2018 US Open (unseeded)
Round	Opponent	Rank	Score
1R	(Estonia) Anett Kontaveit (28)	27	6–7^{(3–7)}, 6–3, 7–5
2R	(Australia) Ajla Tomljanović	58	6–3, 6–7^{(3–7)}, 7–6^{(7–4)}
3R	(Ukraine) Lesia Tsurenko	36	4–6, 0–6

== Wins against top 10 players ==
- Siniaková has a 12–35 (26%) record against players who were, at the time the match was played, ranked in the top 10.

#	Player	Rk	Event	Surface	Rd	Score	Rk	Year	Ref
1	(Romania) Simona Halep	4	Shenzhen Open, China	Hard	2R	6–3, 4–6, 7–5	52	2017	
2	(United Kingdom) Johanna Konta	10	Shenzhen Open, China	Hard	SF	1–6, 6–4, 6–4	52	2017	
3	(Denmark) Caroline Wozniacki	6	Swedish Open, Sweden	Clay	F	6–3, 6–4	56	2017	
4	(France) Caroline Garcia	4	Wuhan Open, China	Hard	2R	3–6, 7–6^{(7–5)}, 7–6^{(7–4)}	47	2018	
5	(Japan) Naomi Osaka	1	French Open, France	Clay	3R	6–4, 6–2	42	2019	
6	(United States) Serena Williams	8	Emilia-Romagna Open, Italy	Clay	2R	7–6^{(7–4)}, 6–2	68	2021	
7	(Spain) Garbiñe Muguruza	9	Canadian Open, Canada	Hard	2R	6–2, 0–6, 6–3	55	2021	
8	(United States) Coco Gauff	7	Billie Jean King Cup, UK	Hard (i)	RR	7–6^{(7–1)}, 6–1	47	2022	
9	(United States) Coco Gauff	3	Qatar Open, Qatar	Hard	2R	6–2, 6–4	42	2024	
10	(China) Zheng Qinwen	8	Berlin Open, Germany	Grass	2R	6–4, 6–4	30	2024	
11	(China) Zheng Qinwen	6	Wimbledon, United Kingdom	Grass	1R	7–5, 4–6, 6–1	81	2025	
12	Mirra Andreeva	8	Indian Wells Open, United States	Hard	3R	4–6, 7–6^{(7–5)}, 6–3	44	2026	

== Double bagel matches ==
Result	Year	Tournament	Tier	Surface	Rd	Opponent	Rk
Win	2021	Cleveland Ladies Open, US	WTA 250	Hard	2R	(Japan) Nagi Hanatani	402

== Awards ==
=== WTA Awards ===
- Doubles Team of the year: 2018, 2021 and 2022 (alongside Barbora Krejčíková)

== See also ==
- Krejčíková–Siniaková doubles team
