= 2023 China Open (tennis) =

- Date: 28 September – 4 October (ATP); 30 September – 8 October (WTA)
- Edition: 22nd (ATP) / 24th (WTA)
- Category: ATP Tour 500 (men); WTA 1000 (women)
- Prize money: ATP $3,633,875; WTA $8,127,389
- Surface: Hard
- Location: Beijing, China
- Venue: National Tennis Center

Champions

Men's singles
- (Italy) Jannik Sinner

Women's singles
- (Poland) Iga Świątek

Men's doubles
- (Croatia) Ivan Dodig / (United States) Austin Krajicek

Women's doubles
- (Czech Republic) Marie Bouzková / (Spain) Sara Sorribes Tormo
- China Open (tennis)

The 2023 China Open was a professional tennis tournament played on outdoor hard courts. It was the 22nd edition of the China Open for the men and the 24th for the women. The tournament is categorized as an ATP 500 event on the 2023 ATP Tour, and as a WTA 1000 event on the 2023 WTA Tour. Both the men's and the women's tournaments were held at the National Tennis Center in Beijing from 28 September to 4 October for the men, and from 30 September to 8 October for the women. This was the first edition of the China Open since 2019, with the intervening editions cancelled due to the COVID-19 pandemic.

== Point distribution ==
Event	W	F	SF	QF	Round of 16	Round of 32	Round of 64	Q	Q2	Q1
Men's singles	500	300	180	90	45	0	—N/a	20	10	0
Men's doubles	500	300	180	90	0	—N/a	—N/a	45	25	0
Women's singles	1,000	650	390	215	120	65	10	30	20	2
Women's doubles	1,000	650	390	215	120	10	—N/a	—N/a	—N/a	—N/a

=== Prize money ===
Event	W	F	SF	QF	Round of 16	Round of 32	Round of 64	Q2	Q1
Men's singles	$679,550	$365,640	$194,860	$99,560	$53,145	$28,345	—N/a	$14,525	$8,150
Men's doubles	$223,210	$119,050	$60,240	$30,110	$15,590	—N/a	—N/a	—N/a	—N/a
Women's singles	$1,324,000	$780,000	$402,000	$185,018	$92,500	$52,000	$32,325		
Women's doubles	$390,218	$218,000	$117,500	$60,900	$34,500	$23,000	—N/a	—N/a	—N/a

== Champions ==
=== Men's singles ===
- (Italy) Jannik Sinner def. Daniil Medvedev, 7–6^{(7–2)}, 7–6^{(7–2)}

=== Women's singles ===
- (Poland) Iga Świątek def. Liudmila Samsonova 6–2, 6–2

=== Men's doubles ===
- (Croatia) Ivan Dodig / (United States) Austin Krajicek def. (Netherlands) Wesley Koolhof / (United Kingdom) Neal Skupski, 6–7^{(12–14)}, 6–3, [10–5]

=== Women's doubles ===
- (Czech Republic) Marie Bouzková / (Spain) Sara Sorribes Tormo def. (Chinese Taipei) Chan Hao-ching / (Mexico) Giuliana Olmos 3–6, 6–0, [10–4]

== ATP singles main-draw entrants ==
=== Seeds ===
Country	Player	Rank^{1}	Seed
ESP	Carlos Alcaraz	2	1
	Daniil Medvedev	3	2
DEN	Holger Rune	4	3
GRE	Stefanos Tsitsipas	5	4
	Andrey Rublev	6	5
ITA	Jannik Sinner	7	6
NOR	Casper Ruud	9	7
GER	Alexander Zverev	10	8

- ^{1} Rankings are as of 18 September 2023

=== Other entrants ===
The following players received wildcards into the singles main draw:

- (United States) Mackenzie McDonald
- (China) Shang Juncheng
- (China) Zhou Yi

The following player received entry as a special exempt:

- (Japan) Yoshihito Nishioka

The following players received entry from the qualifying draw:

- (Italy) Matteo Arnaldi
- (Germany) Yannick Hanfmann
- (South Africa) Lloyd Harris
- (United States) J. J. Wolf

=== Withdrawals ===
- (Spain) Roberto Bautista Agut → replaced by (United Kingdom) Andy Murray
- (Italy) Matteo Berrettini → replaced by (Germany) Jan-Lennard Struff
- (Spain) Pablo Carreño Busta → replaced by (Argentina) Tomás Martín Etcheverry
- (United States) Taylor Fritz → replaced by (Chile) Nicolás Jarry
- (United States) Frances Tiafoe → replaced by (France) Ugo Humbert

== ATP doubles main-draw entrants ==
=== Seeds ===
Country	Player	Country	Player	Rank^{1}	Seed
CRO	Ivan Dodig	USA	Austin Krajicek	3	1
NED	Wesley Koolhof	GBR	Neal Skupski	7	2
ARG	Máximo González	ARG	Andrés Molteni	19	3
MEX	Santiago González	FRA	Édouard Roger-Vasselin	23	4

- Rankings are as of 18 September 2023

=== Other entrants ===
The following pairs received wildcards into the doubles main draw:

- (China) Cui Jie / (China) Wang Aoran
- (China) Sun Fajing / (China) Zhou Yi

The following pair received entry from the qualifying draw:

- (Austria) Alexander Erler / (Austria) Lucas Miedler

=== Withdrawals ===
- (India) Rohan Bopanna / (Australia) Matthew Ebden → replaced by (Argentina) Tomás Martín Etcheverry / (Chile) Nicolás Jarry
- (United States) Rajeev Ram / (United Kingdom) Joe Salisbury → replaced by (Brazil) Marcelo Melo / (Germany) Alexander Zverev

== WTA singles main-draw entrants ==
=== Seeds ===
The following are the seeded players. Seedings are based on WTA rankings as of 25 September 2023. Rankings and points before are as of 2 October 2023.

Because the tournament was not held in 2022, the points dropping column reflects (a) points from tournaments held during the week of 3 October 2022 (Ostrava and Monastir) or (b) the player's 16th best result (in brackets). Only points counting towards the players' rankings as of 2 October 2023 are shown in the table.

Seed	Rank	Player	Points before	Points dropping	Points won	Points after	Status
1	1	Aryna Sabalenka	9,266	(1)	215	9,480	Quarterfinals lost to (Kazakhstan) Elena Rybakina [5]
2	2	(Poland) Iga Świątek	8,195	305	1,000	8,890	Champion, defeated Liudmila Samsonova
3	3	(United States) Coco Gauff	6,165	(100)	390	6,455	Semifinals lost to (Poland) Iga Świątek [2]
4	4	(United States) Jessica Pegula	5,955	(185)	120	5,890	Third round lost to (Latvia) Jeļena Ostapenko [13]
5	5	(Kazakhstan) Elena Rybakina	5,665	185	390	5,870	Semifinals lost to Liudmila Samsonova
6	6	(Greece) Maria Sakkari	4,365	(105)	215	4,475	Quarterfinals lost to (United States) Coco Gauff [3]
7	7	(Tunisia) Ons Jabeur	4,145	60	65	4,150	Second round lost to (Ukraine) Marta Kostyuk
8	8	(Czech Republic) Markéta Vondroušová	3,830	(1)	10	3,839	First round lost to (Ukraine) Anhelina Kalinina
9	10	(France) Caroline Garcia	3,335	(100)	215	3,450	Quarterfinals lost to (Poland) Iga Świątek [2]
10	12	(Czech Republic) Barbora Krejčiková	2,940	470	10	2,480	First round lost to Mirra Andreeva [Q]
11	13	Daria Kasatkina	2,830	(100)	65	2,795	Second round lost to (China) Wang Xinyu
12	14	(Czech Republic) Petra Kvitová	2,695	100	65	2,660	Second round lost to Liudmila Samsonova
13	17	(Latvia) Jeļena Ostapenko	2,505	(55)	215	2,665	Quarterfinals lost to Liudmila Samsonova
14	18	Victoria Azarenka	2,225	(55)	10	2,180	First round lost to (Poland) Magda Linette
15	19	(Brazil) Beatriz Haddad Maia	2,210	(55)	10	2,165	First round lost to (Italy) Jasmine Paolini
16	16	Veronika Kudermetova	2,540	110	120	2,550	Third round lost to (United States) Coco Gauff [3]

==== Withdrawn players ====
The following players would have been seeded, but withdrew before the tournament began.

Rank	Player	Points before	Points dropping	Points after	Withdrawal reason
9	(Czech Republic) Karolína Muchová	3,718	55	3,663	
11	(United States) Madison Keys	2,940	(60)	2,880	
15	(Switzerland) Belinda Bencic	2,605	(60)	2,545	Recovery from food poisoning

=== Other entrants ===
The following players received wildcards into the singles main draw:

- (United States) Sofia Kenin
- (China) Tian Fangran
- (China) Wang Xiyu
- (China) Yuan Yue
- Vera Zvonareva

The following players received entry using a protected ranking:

- (United States) Jennifer Brady
- Anastasia Pavlyuchenkova
- (Australia) Daria Saville

The following players received entry from the qualifying draw:

- Mirra Andreeva
- (Ukraine) Kateryna Baindl
- (United Kingdom) Katie Boulter
- (Poland) Magdalena Fręch
- (United States) Ashlyn Krueger
- (Germany) Eva Lys
- (Kazakhstan) Yulia Putintseva
- (United States) Peyton Stearns

=== Withdrawals ===
- (Romania) Irina-Camelia Begu → replaced by (Australia) Daria Saville
- (Switzerland) Belinda Bencic → replaced by (Czech Republic) Linda Fruhvirtová
- (United States) Danielle Collins → replaced by (Ukraine) Lesia Tsurenko
- (United States) Madison Keys → replaced by (China) Wang Xinyu
- (Czech Republic) Karolína Muchová → replaced by (Spain) Sara Sorribes Tormo
- (Czech Republic) Karolína Plíšková → replaced by (Italy) Martina Trevisan
- (United States) Sloane Stephens → replaced by (Czech Republic) Kateřina Siniaková
- (Ukraine) Elina Svitolina → replaced by (Germany) Tatjana Maria

== WTA doubles main-draw entrants ==
=== Seeds ===
Country	Player	Country	Player	Rank^{1}	Seed
AUS	Storm Hunter	BEL	Elise Mertens	3	1
USA	Coco Gauff	USA	Jessica Pegula	8	2
CZE	Barbora Krejčiková	CZE	Kateřina Siniaková	9	3
CAN	Gabriela Dabrowski	NZL	Erin Routliffe	24	4
USA	Desirae Krawczyk	NED	Demi Schuurs	24	5
TPE	Hsieh Su-wei	CHN	Wang Xinyu	27	6
JPN	Shuko Aoyama	JPN	Ena Shibahara	31	7
GER	Laura Siegemund		Vera Zvonareva	34	8

- ^{1} Rankings are as of 25 September 2023

=== Other entrants ===
The following pairs received wildcards into the doubles main draw:

- (France) Caroline Garcia / (France) Kristina Mladenovic
- (China) Guo Hanyu / (China) Jiang Xinyu
- (China) Wang Xiyu / (China) Yuan Yue

The following pair received entry as alternates:

- (Italy) Elisabetta Cocciaretto / (Italy) Martina Trevisan

=== Withdrawals ===
- Anna Blinkova / Anastasia Potapova → replaced by (Italy) Elisabetta Cocciaretto / (Italy) Martina Trevisan
