= 2019 China Open – Men's singles =

Men's singles
- 2019 China Open

Final
- Champion: (Austria) Dominic Thiem
- Runner-up: (Greece) Stefanos Tsitsipas
- Score: 3–6, 6–4, 6–1

Details
- Draw: 32 (4Q / 3WC)
- Seeds: 8

Events
Singles	men	women
Doubles	men	women
← 2018 ·	China Open	· 2023 →

Nikoloz Basilashvili was the defending champion, but lost in the second round to Stefanos Tsitsipas.

Dominic Thiem won the title, defeating Tsitsipas in the final, 3–6, 6–4, 6–1.

== Seeds ==
1. (Austria) Dominic Thiem (champion)
2. (Germany) Alexander Zverev (semifinals)
3. (Greece) Stefanos Tsitsipas (final)
4. (Russia) Karen Khachanov (semifinals)
5. (Spain) Roberto Bautista Agut (first round, retired)
6. (Italy) Fabio Fognini (quarterfinals)
7. (France) Gaël Monfils (first round)
8. (Italy) Matteo Berrettini (first round)

== Draw ==
=== Key ===
- Q = Qualifier
- WC = Wild card
- LL = Lucky loser
- Alt = Alternate
- SE = Special exempt
- PR = Protected ranking
- ITF = ITF entry
- JE = Junior exempt
- w/o = Walkover
- r = Retired
- d = Defaulted
- SR = Special ranking

=== Finals ===
Semifinals
1	(Austria) Dominic Thiem	2	7^{7}	7
4	(Russia) Karen Khachanov	6	6^{5}	5
3	(Greece) Stefanos Tsitsipas	7^{8}	6
2	(Germany) Alexander Zverev	6^{6}	4

Final
1	(Austria) Dominic Thiem	3	6	6
3	(Greece) Stefanos Tsitsipas	6	4	1

=== Top half ===
First round
1	(Austria) D Thiem	6	6
(France) R Gasquet	4	1
(United Kingdom) K Edmund	4	6	6^{5}
WC	(China) Zh Zhang	6	3	7^{7}
(Chile) C Garín	6^{5}	0^{r}
Q	(United Kingdom) C Norrie	7^{7}	1
PR	(United Kingdom) A Murray	7^{7}	7^{9}
8	(Italy) M Berrettini	6^{2}	6^{7}
4	(Russia) K Khachanov	6	7^{9}
Q	(Uruguay) P Cuevas	2	6^{7}
Q	(France) J Chardy	6^{7}	6	7^{7}
(Italy) M Cecchinato	7^{9}	3	6^{4}
(Bulgaria) G Dimitrov	2	5
(Russia) A Rublev	6	7
(Kazakhstan) M Kukushkin	4	6	6^{6}
6	(Italy) F Fognini	6	4	7^{8}

Second round
1	(Austria) D Thiem	6	6
WC	(China) Zh Zhang	3	3
Q	(United Kingdom) C Norrie	6^{6}	7^{7}	1
PR	(United Kingdom) A Murray	7^{8}	6^{4}	6
4	(Russia) K Khachanov	7^{7}	7^{7}
Q	(France) J Chardy	6^{0}	6^{5}
(Russia) A Rublev	3	4
6	(Italy) F Fognini	6	6

Quarterfinals
1	(Austria) D Thiem	6	7^{7}
PR	(United Kingdom) A Murray	2	6^{3}
4	(Russia) K Khachanov	3	6	6
6	(Italy) F Fognini	6	3	1

Semifinals
1	(Austria) D Thiem	2	7^{7}	7
4	(Russia) K Khachanov	6	6^{5}	5

=== Bottom half ===
First round
7	(France) G Monfils	4	7^{7}	3
(United States) J Isner	6	6^{5}	6
Q	(United Kingdom) D Evans	6	6
WC	(China) Z Li	3	4
(Georgia (country)) N Basilashvili	6	7^{7}
(Argentina) G Pella	4	6^{3}
(Serbia) D Lajović	6	3	4
3	(Greece) S Tsitsipas	4	6	6
5	(Spain) R Bautista Agut	6^{2}	1^{r}
(United States) S Querrey	7^{7}	4
(Argentina) D Schwartzman	6	3	6
(Spain) F Verdasco	4	6	3
(Canada) F Auger-Aliassime	6	6
SE	(Spain) A Ramos Viñolas	3	4
WC	(United States) F Tiafoe	3	2
2	(Germany) A Zverev	6	6

Second round
(United States) J Isner	7^{7}	7
Q	(United Kingdom) D Evans	6^{3}	5
(Georgia (country)) N Basilashvili	6	3	2
3	(Greece) S Tsitsipas	4	6	6
(United States) S Querrey	7^{7}	6^{6}	6
(Argentina) D Schwartzman	6^{2}	7^{8}	3
(Canada) F Auger-Aliassime	3	1
2	(Germany) A Zverev	6	6

Quarterfinals
(United States) J Isner	6^{3}	3
3	(Greece) S Tsitsipas	7^{7}	6
(United States) S Querrey	6^{3}	2
2	(Germany) A Zverev	7^{7}	6

Semifinals
3	(Greece) S Tsitsipas	7^{8}	6
2	(Germany) A Zverev	6^{6}	4

== Qualifying ==
=== Seeds ===
1. (Uruguay) Pablo Cuevas (qualified)
2. (United Kingdom) Dan Evans (qualified)
3. (Hungary) Márton Fucsovics (withdrew)
4. (United Kingdom) Cameron Norrie (qualified)
5. (Lithuania) Ričardas Berankis (first round)
6. (France) Jérémy Chardy (qualified)
7. (Italy) Andreas Seppi (first round)
8. (Germany) Dominik Koepfer (qualifying competition)

=== Qualifiers ===
1. (Uruguay) Pablo Cuevas
2. (United Kingdom) Dan Evans
3. (France) Jérémy Chardy
4. (United Kingdom) Cameron Norrie

=== Qualifying draw ===
==== First qualifier ====
First round
1	(Uruguay) Pablo Cuevas	6	6
WC	(China) Wu Di	1	4
(Chinese Taipei) Jason Jung	3	7^{7}	4
8	(Germany) Dominik Koepfer	6	6^{4}	6

Qualifying competition
1	(Uruguay) Pablo Cuevas	6	6
8	(Germany) Dominik Koepfer	2	3

==== Second qualifier ====
First round
2	(United Kingdom) Dan Evans	6	6
WC	(China) Cui Jie	3	1
(Canada) Vasek Pospisil	6	6
7	(Italy) Andreas Seppi	3	4

Qualifying competition
2	(United Kingdom) Dan Evans	3	6	6
(Canada) Vasek Pospisil	6	3	4

==== Third qualifier ====
First round
3	(Hungary) Márton Fucsovics
(Australia) Bernard Tomic	^{w/o}
Alt	(Canada) Frank Dancevic	1	4
6	(France) Jérémy Chardy	6	6

Qualifying competition
(Australia) Bernard Tomic	2^{r}
6	(France) Jérémy Chardy	2

==== Fourth qualifier ====
First round
4	(United Kingdom) Cameron Norrie	6	6
WC	(China) He Yecong	2	1
Alt	(Bosnia and Herzegovina) Damir Džumhur	6	6^{5}	6
5	(Lithuania) Ričardas Berankis	3	7^{7}	1

Qualifying competition
4	(United Kingdom) Cameron Norrie	1	6	6
Alt	(Bosnia and Herzegovina) Damir Džumhur	6	3	4
