= 2023 China Open – Women's singles =

Women's singles
- 2023 China Open

Final
- Champion: (Poland) Iga Świątek
- Runner-up: Liudmila Samsonova
- Score: 6–2, 6–2

Details
- Draw: 60
- Seeds: 16

Events
| Singles | men | women |
| Doubles | men | women |
| ← 2019 · | China Open | · 2024 → |

Iga Świątek defeated Liudmila Samsonova in the final, 6–2, 6–2 to win the women's singles tennis title at the 2023 China Open. It was her sixth career WTA 1000 title.

Naomi Osaka was the reigning champion from 2019, when the event was last held, but was on maternity leave this year.

== Seeds ==
1. Aryna Sabalenka (quarterfinals)
2. (Poland) Iga Świątek (champion)
3. (United States) Coco Gauff (semifinals)
4. (United States) Jessica Pegula (third round)
5. (Kazakhstan) Elena Rybakina (semifinals)
6. (Greece) Maria Sakkari (quarterfinals)
7. (Tunisia) Ons Jabeur (second round)
8. (Czech Republic) Markéta Vondroušová (first round)
9. (France) Caroline Garcia (quarterfinals)
10. (Czech Republic) Barbora Krejčíková (first round)
11. Daria Kasatkina (second round)
12. (Czech Republic) Petra Kvitová (second round)
13. (Latvia) Jeļena Ostapenko (quarterfinals)
14. Victoria Azarenka (first round)
15. (Brazil) Beatriz Haddad Maia (first round)
16. Veronika Kudermetova (third round)

Click on the seed number of a player to go to their draw section.

The four Tokyo semifinalists received a bye into the second round. They are as follows:

- Veronika Kudermetova
- Anastasia Pavlyuchenkova
- (United States) Jessica Pegula
- (Greece) Maria Sakkari

== Draw ==
=== Key ===
- Q = Qualifier
- WC = Wild card
- LL = Lucky loser
- Alt = Alternate
- SE = Special exempt
- PR = Protected ranking
- ITF = ITF entry
- JE = Junior exempt
- w/o = Walkover
- r = Retired
- d = Defaulted
- SR = Special ranking

=== Finals ===
Quarterfinals
1 | Aryna Sabalenka | 5 | 2
5 | (Kazakhstan) Elena Rybakina | 7 | 6
13 | (Latvia) Jeļena Ostapenko | 3 | 2
Liudmila Samsonova | 6 | 6
6 | (Greece) Maria Sakkari | 2 | 4
3 | (United States) Coco Gauff | 6 | 6
9 | (France) Caroline Garcia | 7^{10} | 6^{5} | 1
2 | (Poland) Iga Świątek | 6^{8} | 7^{7} | 6

Semifinals
5 | (Kazakhstan) Elena Rybakina | 6^{7} | 3
Liudmila Samsonova | 7^{9} | 6
3 | (United States) Coco Gauff | 2 | 3
2 | (Poland) Iga Świątek | 6 | 6

Final
Liudmila Samsonova | 2 | 2
2 | (Poland) Iga Świątek | 6 | 6

=== Top half ===
==== Section 1 ====
First round
1 | A Sabalenka | 6 | 6
WC | (United States) S Kenin | 1 | 2
Q | (Poland) M Fręch | 4 | 6 | 2
Q | (United Kingdom) K Boulter | 6 | 3 | 6
WC | (China) Y Yuan | 3 | 6 | 6
(Belgium) E Mertens | 6 | 1 | 4
(Italy) J Paolini | 3 | 6 | 6
15 | (Brazil) B Haddad Maia | 6 | 4 | 4
10 | (Czech Republic) B Krejčíková | 2 | 2
Q | M Andreeva | 6 | 6
(Italy) M Trevisan | 3 | 6^{2}
(Germany) T Maria | 6 | 7^{7}
(China) Q Zheng | 1 | 2
5 | (Kazakhstan) E Rybakina | 6 | 6

Second round
1 | A Sabalenka | 7 | 7^{7}
Q | (United Kingdom) K Boulter | 5 | 6^{2}
WC | (China) Y Yuan | 6 | 3 | 4
(Italy) J Paolini | 2 | 6 | 6
Q | M Andreeva | 6 | 6
PR | A Pavlyuchenkova | 2 | 1
(Germany) T Maria | 5 | 0
5 | (Kazakhstan) E Rybakina | 7 | 6

Third round
1 | A Sabalenka | 6 | 7^{7}
(Italy) J Paolini | 4 | 6^{4}
Q | M Andreeva | 6 | 4 | 1
5 | (Kazakhstan) E Rybakina | 2 | 6 | 6

Quarterfinals
1 | A Sabalenka | 5 | 2
5 | (Kazakhstan) E Rybakina | 7 | 6

==== Section 2 ====
First round
(Croatia) D Vekić | 3 | 5
A Blinkova | 6 | 7
WC | (China) F Tian | 4 | 2
(Czech Republic) L Nosková | 6 | 6
Q | (Germany) E Lys | 6 | 3 | 2
13 | (Latvia) J Ostapenko | 2 | 6 | 6
12 | (Czech Republic) P Kvitová | 6^{6} | 7 | 6
WC | (China) Xiy Wang | 7^{8} | 5 | 3
(United States) A Parks | 4 | 6^{4}
L Samsonova | 6 | 7^{7}
(Ukraine) M Kostyuk | 1 | 6 | 6
(Italy) E Cocciaretto | 6 | 3 | 4
Q | (United States) A Krueger | 3 | 4
7 | (Tunisia) O Jabeur | 6 | 6

Second round
4 | (United States) J Pegula | 6^{2} | 6 | 6
A Blinkova | 7^{7} | 2 | 1
(Czech Republic) L Nosková
13 | (Latvia) J Ostapenko | w/o
12 | (Czech Republic) P Kvitová | 4 | 5
L Samsonova | 6 | 7
(Ukraine) M Kostyuk | 7^{7} | 6
7 | (Tunisia) O Jabeur | 6^{5} | 1

Third round
4 | (United States) J Pegula | 4 | 2
13 | (Latvia) J Ostapenko | 6 | 6
L Samsonova | 6 | 6^{4} | 7
(Ukraine) M Kostyuk | 4 | 7^{7} | 5

Quarterfinals
13 | (Latvia) J Ostapenko | 3 | 2
L Samsonova | 6 | 6

=== Bottom half ===
==== Section 3 ====
First round
(Czech Republic) L Fruhvirtová | 6 | 6
(Netherlands) A Rus | 0 | 3
(China) Xin Wang | 6 | 6
WC | V Zvonareva | 4 | 3
(Egypt) M Sherif | 6 | 4 | 6^{8}
11 | D Kasatkina | 1 | 6 | 7^{10}
(Ukraine) L Tsurenko | 6 | 3
(China) L Zhu | 0 | 0^{r}
(Romania) S Cîrstea | 2 | 6 | 6^{3}
(Croatia) P Martić | 6 | 2 | 7^{7}
E Alexandrova | 5 | 3
3 | (United States) C Gauff | 7 | 6

Second round
6 | (Greece) M Sakkari | 6 | 6
(Czech Republic) L Fruhvirtová | 4 | 2
(China) Xin Wang | 6 | 6
11 | D Kasatkina | 4 | 2
16 | V Kudermetova | 3 | 6 | 6
(Ukraine) L Tsurenko | 6 | 0 | 0
(Croatia) P Martić | 5 | 7 | 6^{2}
3 | (United States) C Gauff | 7 | 5 | 7^{7}

Third round
6 | (Greece) M Sakkari | 6 | 2 | 6
(China) Xin Wang | 4 | 6 | 3
16 | V Kudermetova | 6^{5} | 2
3 | (United States) C Gauff | 7^{7} | 6

Quarterfinals
6 | (Greece) M Sakkari | 2 | 4
3 | (United States) C Gauff | 6 | 6

==== Section 4 ====
First round
8 | (Czech Republic) M Vondroušová | 6 | 4 | 1
(Ukraine) A Kalinina | 1 | 6 | 6
PR | (Australia) D Saville | 6 | 6
(Czech Republic) K Siniaková | 2 | 2
(Czech Republic) M Bouzková | 2 | 6^{5}
Q | (Kazakhstan) Y Putintseva | 6 | 7^{7}
Q | (Ukraine) K Baindl | 2 | 4
9 | (France) C Garcia | 6 | 6
14 | V Azarenka | 7 | 1 | 2
(Poland) M Linette | 5 | 6 | 6
PR | (United States) J Brady | 6 | 6
Q | (United States) P Stearns | 4 | 2
A Potapova | 2 | 6 | 1
(France) V Gracheva | 6 | 3 | 6
(Spain) S Sorribes Tormo | 4 | 3
2 | (Poland) I Świątek | 6 | 6

Second round
(Ukraine) A Kalinina | 6 | 7^{7}
PR | (Australia) D Saville | 2 | 6^{5}
Q | (Kazakhstan) Y Putintseva | 3 | 6 | 3
9 | (France) C Garcia | 6 | 3 | 6
(Poland) M Linette | 3
PR | (United States) J Brady | 1^{r}
(France) V Gracheva | 4 | 1
2 | (Poland) I Świątek | 6 | 6

Third round
(Ukraine) A Kalinina | 3 | 2
9 | (France) C Garcia | 6 | 6
(Poland) M Linette | 1 | 1
2 | (Poland) I Świątek | 6 | 6

Quarterfinals
9 | (France) C Garcia | 7^{10} | 6^{5} | 1
2 | (Poland) I Świątek | 6^{8} | 7^{7} | 6

== Qualifying ==
=== Seeds ===
1. (United States) Peyton Stearns (qualified)
2. (United Kingdom) Katie Boulter (qualified)
3. (Canada) Leylah Fernandez (first round)
4. Mirra Andreeva (qualified)
5. (United States) Bernarda Pera (first round)
6. (Italy) Lucia Bronzetti (qualifying competition)
7. (Spain) Rebeka Masarova (first round)
8. Elina Avanesyan (qualifying competition)
9. (Poland) Magdalena Fręch (qualified)
10. (Kazakhstan) Yulia Putintseva (qualified)
11. (Denmark) Clara Tauson (withdrew)
12. Kamilla Rakhimova (qualifying competition)
13. (Belgium) Yanina Wickmayer (qualifying competition)
14. (Spain) Cristina Bucșa (qualifying competition)
15. Anna Kalinskaya (qualifying competition, retired)
16. Aliaksandra Sasnovich (first round)

=== Qualifiers ===
1. (United States) Peyton Stearns
2. (United Kingdom) Katie Boulter
3. (Germany) Eva Lys
4. Mirra Andreeva
5. (Poland) Magdalena Fręch
6. (United States) Ashlyn Krueger
7. (Ukraine) Kateryna Baindl
8. (Kazakhstan) Yulia Putintseva

=== Draw ===
==== First qualifier ====
First round
1 | (United States) Peyton Stearns | 6 | 6
(Germany) Anna-Lena Friedsam | 2 | 1
Alt | (Brazil) Laura Pigossi | 0 | 7^{7} | 6
16 | Aliaksandra Sasnovich | 6 | 6^{4} | 4

Qualifying competition
1 | (United States) Peyton Stearns | 6 | 6
Alt | (Brazil) Laura Pigossi | 1 | 1

==== Second qualifier ====
First round
2 | (United Kingdom) Katie Boulter | 6 | 6
WC | (China) Bai Zhuoxuan | 2 | 2
(United States) Emina Bektas | 6 | 1 | 6^{5}
12 | Kamilla Rakhimova | 3 | 6 | 7^{7}

Qualifying competition
2 | (United Kingdom) Katie Boulter | 6 | 6
12 | Kamilla Rakhimova | 1 | 1

==== Third qualifier ====
First round
3 | (Canada) Leylah Fernandez | 4 | 3
Alt | (Germany) Eva Lys | 6 | 6
(United States) Kayla Day | 6 | 2 | 1
14 | (Spain) Cristina Bucșa | 2 | 6 | 6

Qualifying competition
Alt | (Germany) Eva Lys | 6 | 6
14 | (Spain) Cristina Bucșa | 2 | 1

==== Fourth qualifier ====
First round
4 | Mirra Andreeva | 6 | 6
(Australia) Kimberly Birrell | 3 | 4
WC | (China) You Xiaodi | 6 | 4 | 5
15 | Anna Kalinskaya | 4 | 6 | 7

Qualifying competition
4 | Mirra Andreeva | 6 | 3
15 | Anna Kalinskaya | 0 | 1^{r}

==== Fifth qualifier ====
First round
5 | (United States) Bernarda Pera | 2 | 0
(United States) Claire Liu | 6 | 6
(France) Diane Parry | 4 | 4
9 | (Poland) Magdalena Fręch | 6 | 6

Qualifying competition
(United States) Claire Liu
9 | (Poland) Magdalena Fręch | w/o

==== Sixth qualifier ====
First round
6 | (Italy) Lucia Bronzetti | 6 | 1 | 6
Alt | (Canada) Rebecca Marino | 4 | 6 | 2
(Germany) Tamara Korpatsch | 6^{7} | 1
Alt | (United States) Ashlyn Krueger | 7^{9} | 6

Qualifying competition
6 | (Italy) Lucia Bronzetti | 4 | 7 | 4
Alt | (United States) Ashlyn Krueger | 6 | 5 | 6

==== Seventh qualifier ====
First round
7 | (Spain) Rebeka Masarova | 2 | 4
(Ukraine) Kateryna Baindl | 6 | 6
WC | (China) Wei Sijia | 1 | 3
13 | (Belgium) Yanina Wickmayer | 6 | 6

Qualifying competition
(Ukraine) Kateryna Baindl | 6 | 7
13 | (Belgium) Yanina Wickmayer | 3 | 5

==== Eighth qualifier ====
First round
8 | Elina Avanesyan | 6 | 6
WC | (China) Ren Yufei | 3 | 1
(United Kingdom) Jodie Burrage | 3 | 3
10 | (Kazakhstan) Yulia Putintseva | 6 | 6

Qualifying competition
8 | Elina Avanesyan | 1 | 4
10 | (Kazakhstan) Yulia Putintseva | 6 | 6
