= 2018 China Open – Men's singles =

Men's singles
- 2018 China Open

Final
- Champion: (Georgia (country)) Nikoloz Basilashvili
- Runner-up: (Argentina) Juan Martín del Potro
- Score: 6–4, 6–4

Details
- Draw: 32 (4Q / 3WC)
- Seeds: 8

Events
| Singles | men | women |
| Doubles | men | women |
| ← 2017 · | China Open | · 2019 → |

Rafael Nadal was the defending champion but withdrew with a knee injury before the tournament began.

Nikoloz Basilashvili won the title, defeating Juan Martín del Potro in the final, 6–4, 6–4.

== Seeds ==
1. (Argentina) Juan Martín del Potro (final)
2. (Germany) Alexander Zverev (second round)
3. (Bulgaria) Grigor Dimitrov (second round)
4. (Italy) Fabio Fognini (semifinals, withdrew)
5. (United Kingdom) Kyle Edmund (semifinals)
6. (United States) Jack Sock (first round)
7. (Croatia) Borna Ćorić (first round)
8. (Italy) Marco Cecchinato (second round)

== Draw ==
=== Key ===
- Q = Qualifier
- WC = Wild card
- LL = Lucky loser
- Alt = Alternate
- SE = Special exempt
- PR = Protected ranking
- ITF = ITF entry
- JE = Junior exempt
- w/o = Walkover
- r = Retired
- d = Defaulted
- SR = Special ranking

=== Finals ===
Semifinals
1 | (Argentina) Juan Martín del Potro | w/o
4 | (Italy) Fabio Fognini
5 | (United Kingdom) Kyle Edmund | 6^{6} | 4
(Georgia (country)) Nikoloz Basilashvili | 7^{8} | 6

Final
1 | (Argentina) Juan Martín del Potro | 4 | 4
(Georgia (country)) Nikoloz Basilashvili | 6 | 6

=== Top half ===
First round
1 | (Argentina) JM del Potro | 7 | 6
(Spain) A Ramos Viñolas | 5 | 2
(Russia) K Khachanov | 6 | 6
(United States) S Querrey | 4 | 4
(Germany) M Zverev | 1 | 4
(Serbia) F Krajinović | 6 | 6
WC | (Spain) F López | 7 | 5 | 7
7 | (Croatia) B Ćorić | 5 | 7 | 5
4 | (Italy) F Fognini | 1 | 6 | 6
Q | (Moldova) R Albot | 6 | 3 | 3
SE | (Portugal) J Sousa | 0 | 4
(Russia) A Rublev | 6 | 6
(Italy) A Seppi | 3 | 4
(Hungary) M Fucsovics | 6 | 6
WC | (Cyprus) M Baghdatis | 6 | 4 | 5
8 | (Italy) M Cecchinato | 1 | 6 | 7

Second round
1 | (Argentina) JM del Potro | 6 | 7^{7}
(Russia) K Khachanov | 4 | 6^{4}
(Serbia) F Krajinović | 7^{7} | 6
WC | (Spain) F López | 6^{5} | 3
4 | (Italy) F Fognini | 6 | 6
(Russia) A Rublev | 4 | 3
(Hungary) M Fucsovics | 6 | 6
8 | (Italy) M Cecchinato | 4 | 2

Quarterfinals
1 | (Argentina) JM del Potro | 6 | 6
(Serbia) F Krajinović | 3 | 0
4 | (Italy) F Fognini | 6 | 6
(Hungary) M Fucsovics | 4 | 4

Semifinals
1 | (Argentina) JM del Potro | w/o
4 | (Italy) F Fognini

=== Bottom half ===
First round
5 | (United Kingdom) K Edmund | 3 | 6 | 6
(Germany) P Gojowczyk | 6 | 1 | 2
Q | (Italy) M Berrettini | 6 | 6
(Argentina) L Mayer | 3 | 2
Q | (Canada) V Pospisil | 6 | 4 | 4
Q | (Serbia) D Lajović | 2 | 6 | 6
LL | (United States) T Sandgren | 5 | 3
3 | (Bulgaria) G Dimitrov | 7 | 6
6 | (United States) J Sock | 7^{8} | 5 | 2
(Georgia (country)) N Basilashvili | 6^{6} | 7 | 6
(Spain) F Verdasco | 2 | 7^{7} | 7^{7}
(France) G Monfils | 6 | 6^{3} | 6^{5}
WC | (China) Y Wu | 4 | 3
Alt | (Tunisia) M Jaziri | 6 | 6
(Spain) R Bautista Agut | 4 | 4
2 | (Germany) A Zverev | 6 | 6

Second round
5 | (United Kingdom) K Edmund | 7 | 6^{2} | 7
Q | (Italy) M Berrettini | 5 | 7^{7} | 5
Q | (Serbia) D Lajović | 6 | 2 | 6
3 | (Bulgaria) G Dimitrov | 4 | 6 | 4
(Georgia (country)) N Basilashvili | 7^{7} | 6
(Spain) F Verdasco | 6^{3} | 4
Alt | (Tunisia) M Jaziri | 7^{7} | 2 | 6
2 | (Germany) A Zverev | 6^{4} | 6 | 4

Quarterfinals
5 | (United Kingdom) K Edmund | 6 | 7^{7}
Q | (Serbia) D Lajović | 3 | 6^{4}
(Georgia (country)) N Basilashvili | 6 | 6
Alt | (Tunisia) M Jaziri | 2 | 2

Semifinals
5 | (United Kingdom) K Edmund | 6^{6} | 4
(Georgia (country)) N Basilashvili | 7^{8} | 6

== Qualifying ==
=== Seeds ===
1. (Serbia) Dušan Lajović (qualified)
2. (United States) Tennys Sandgren (qualifying competition, lucky loser)
3. (Italy) Matteo Berrettini (qualified)
4. (Tunisia) Malek Jaziri (moved to main draw)
5. (United Kingdom) Cameron Norrie (qualifying competition)
6. (Russia) Evgeny Donskoy (first round)
7. (Canada) Vasek Pospisil (qualified)
8. (Kazakhstan) Mikhail Kukushkin (first round)

=== Qualifiers ===
1. (Serbia) Dušan Lajović
2. (Canada) Vasek Pospisil
3. (Italy) Matteo Berrettini
4. (Moldova) Radu Albot

=== Lucky loser ===
1. (United States) Tennys Sandgren

=== Qualifying draw ===
==== First qualifier ====
First round
1 | (Serbia) Dušan Lajović | 6 | 6
WC | (China) Wu Di | 2 | 4
(Belarus) Ilya Ivashka | 3 | 5
5 | (United Kingdom) Cameron Norrie | 6 | 7

Qualifying competition
1 | (Serbia) Dušan Lajović | 6 | 6
5 | (United Kingdom) Cameron Norrie | 4 | 4

==== Second qualifier ====
First round
2 | (United States) Tennys Sandgren | 6 | 6
Alt | (India) Ramkumar Ramanathan | 1 | 2
WC | (China) Te Rigele | 1 | 2
7 | (Canada) Vasek Pospisil | 6 | 6

Qualifying competition
2 | (United States) Tennys Sandgren | 6^{1} | 2
7 | (Canada) Vasek Pospisil | 7^{7} | 6

==== Third qualifier ====
First round
3 | (Italy) Matteo Berrettini | 6 | 6
WC | (China) Zhang Zhizhen | 3 | 2
(Czech Republic) Jiří Veselý | 7^{7} | 6
6 | (Russia) Evgeny Donskoy | 6^{3} | 3

Qualifying competition
3 | (Italy) Matteo Berrettini | 6 | 6
(Czech Republic) Jiří Veselý | 3 | 2

==== Fourth qualifier ====
First round
Alt | (China) Li Zhe | 5 | 4
(Serbia) Viktor Troicki | 7 | 6
(Moldova) Radu Albot | 6 | 6
8 | (Kazakhstan) Mikhail Kukushkin | 2 | 4

Qualifying competition
(Serbia) Viktor Troicki
(Moldova) Radu Albot | w/o
