= 2023 China Open – Men's singles =

Men's singles
- 2023 China Open

Final
- Champion: (Italy) Jannik Sinner
- Runner-up: Daniil Medvedev
- Score: 7–6^{(7–2)}, 7–6^{(7–2)}

Details
- Draw: 32 (4Q / 3WC)
- Seeds: 8

Events
Singles	men	women
Doubles	men	women
← 2019 ·	China Open	· 2024 →

Jannik Sinner defeated Daniil Medvedev in the final, 7–6^{(7–2)}, 7–6^{(7–2)} to win the men's singles tennis title at the 2023 China Open. It was his first win over Medvedev, in their seventh meeting.

Dominic Thiem was the reigning champion from 2019, when the tournament was last held, but he chose to compete in Astana instead.

== Seeds ==
1. (Spain) Carlos Alcaraz (semifinals)
2. Daniil Medvedev (final)
3. (Denmark) Holger Rune (second round)
4. (Greece) Stefanos Tsitsipas (first round)
5. Andrey Rublev (second round)
6. (Italy) Jannik Sinner (champion)
7. (Norway) Casper Ruud (quarterfinals)
8. (Germany) Alexander Zverev (semifinals)

== Draw ==
=== Key ===
- Q = Qualifier
- WC = Wild card
- LL = Lucky loser
- Alt = Alternate
- ITF = ITF entry
- PR = Protected ranking
- SR = Special ranking
- SE = Special exempt
- JE = Junior exempt
- JR = Junior Accelerator Programme entrant
- CO = College Accelerator Programme entrant
- NG = Next Gen Accelerator Program entrant
- w/o = Walkover
- r = Retired
- d = Defaulted

=== Finals ===
Semifinals
1	(Spain) Carlos Alcaraz	6^{4}	1
6	(Italy) Jannik Sinner	7^{7}	6
8	(Germany) Alexander Zverev	4	3
2	Daniil Medvedev	6	6

Final
6	(Italy) Jannik Sinner	7^{7}	7^{7}
2	Daniil Medvedev	6^{2}	6^{2}

=== Top half ===
First round
1	(Spain) C Alcaraz	6	6
Q	(Germany) Y Hanfmann	4	3
K Khachanov	3	6	2
(Italy) L Musetti	6	1	6
Q	(South Africa) L Harris	7^{7}	6^{4}	3
(Argentina) TM Etcheverry	6^{5}	7^{7}	6
(Germany) J-L Struff	6^{5}	3
7	(Norway) C Ruud	7^{7}	6
3	(Denmark) H Rune	6	6
(Canada) F Auger-Aliassime	4	4
WC	(United States) M McDonald	6	6^{4}	1
(Bulgaria) G Dimitrov	2	7^{7}	6
WC	(China) J Shang	7	5	1
SE	(Japan) Y Nishioka	5	7	6
(United Kingdom) D Evans	4	7^{7}	3
6	(Italy) J Sinner	6	6^{2}	6

Second round
1	(Spain) C Alcaraz	6	6
(Italy) L Musetti	2	2
(Argentina) TM Etcheverry	6	5	6^{7}
7	(Norway) C Ruud	1	7	7^{9}
3	(Denmark) H Rune	3	5
(Bulgaria) G Dimitrov	6	7
SE	(Japan) Y Nishioka	2	0
6	(Italy) J Sinner	6	6

Quarterfinals
1	(Spain) C Alcaraz	6	6
7	(Norway) C Ruud	4	2
(Bulgaria) G Dimitrov	4	6	2
6	(Italy) J Sinner	6	3	6

Semifinals
1	(Spain) C Alcaraz	6^{4}	1
6	(Italy) J Sinner	7^{7}	6

=== Bottom half ===
First round
8	(Germany) A Zverev	6^{2}	6	6
(Argentina) D Schwartzman	7^{7}	1	4
(Spain) A Davidovich Fokina	6	6
WC	(China) Y Zhou	2	2
Q	(Italy) M Arnaldi	6	6
Q	(United States) JJ Wolf	2	2
(Chile) N Jarry	6	6
4	(Greece) S Tsitsipas	4	4
5	A Rublev	4	6	6
(United Kingdom) C Norrie	6	1	4
(France) U Humbert	7	3	6
(Italy) L Sonego	5	6	0
(Australia) A de Minaur	6	5	7^{8}
(United Kingdom) A Murray	3	7	6^{6}
(United States) T Paul	2	1
2	D Medvedev	6	6

Second round
8	(Germany) A Zverev	6^{4}	6	6
(Spain) A Davidovich Fokina	7^{7}	2	1
Q	(Italy) M Arnaldi	7^{7}	6^{4}	3
(Chile) N Jarry	6^{4}	7^{7}	6
5	A Rublev	7	3	6^{3}
(France) U Humbert	5	6	7^{7}
(Australia) A de Minaur	6^{3}	3
2	D Medvedev	7^{7}	6

Quarterfinals
8	(Germany) A Zverev	6	6^{5}	6
(Chile) N Jarry	1	7^{7}	3
(France) U Humbert	4	6	1
2	D Medvedev	6	3	6

Semifinals
8	(Germany) A Zverev	4	3
2	D Medvedev	6	6

== Qualifying ==
=== Seeds ===
1. (Australia) Max Purcell (qualifying competition)
2. (Japan) Yoshihito Nishioka (special exempt to main draw)
3. (Serbia) Miomir Kecmanović (qualifying competition)
4. (Italy) Matteo Arnaldi (qualified)
5. (Germany) Daniel Altmaier (first round)
6. (Australia) Aleksandar Vukic (qualifying competition)
7. (United States) J. J. Wolf (qualified)
8. (Serbia) Dušan Lajović (first round)

=== Qualifiers ===
1. (United States) J. J. Wolf
2. (South Africa) Lloyd Harris
3. (Germany) Yannick Hanfmann
4. (Italy) Matteo Arnaldi

=== Qualifying draw ===
==== First qualifier ====
First round
1	(Australia) Max Purcell	4	6	6
WC	(China) Li Hanwen	6	1	2
WC	(China) Bai Yan	6^{5}	3
7	(United States) J. J. Wolf	7^{7}	6

Qualifying competition
1	(Australia) Max Purcell	3	0
7	(United States) J. J. Wolf	6	6

==== Second qualifier ====
First round
Alt	(Chile) Cristian Garín	7	6
WC	(China) Cui Jie	5	2
PR	(South Africa) Lloyd Harris	6	6
5	(Germany) Daniel Altmaier	3	1

Qualifying competition
Alt	(Chile) Cristian Garín	3	0
PR	(South Africa) Lloyd Harris	6	6

==== Third qualifier ====
First round
3	(Serbia) Miomir Kecmanović	7	6^{5}	6
Alt	Pavel Kotov	5	7^{7}	1
(Germany) Yannick Hanfmann	6	7^{9}
8	(Serbia) Dušan Lajović	3	6^{7}

Qualifying competition
3	(Serbia) Miomir Kecmanović	1	4
(Germany) Yannick Hanfmann	6	6

==== Fourth qualifier ====
First round
4	(Italy) Matteo Arnaldi	4	6	7^{14}
Alt	(Colombia) Daniel Elahi Galán	6	3	6^{12}
(United States) Brandon Nakashima	4	4
6	(Australia) Aleksandar Vukic	6	6

Qualifying competition
4	(Italy) Matteo Arnaldi	6	6
6	(Australia) Aleksandar Vukic	3	2
