= 2018 China Open (tennis) =

- Date: 1 October – 7 October
- Edition: 20th (ATP) / 22nd (WTA)
- Category: ATP World Tour 500 (men); Premier Mandatory (women)
- Prize money: ATP $ WTA $8,285,274
- Surface: Hard
- Location: Beijing, China
- Venue: National Tennis Center

Champions

Men's singles
- (Georgia (country)) Nikoloz Basilashvili

Women's singles
- (Denmark) Caroline Wozniacki

Men's doubles
- (Poland) Łukasz Kubot / (Brazil) Marcelo Melo

Women's doubles
- (Czech Republic) Andrea Sestini Hlaváčková / (Czech Republic) Barbora Strýcová
← 2017 ·	China Open (tennis)	· 2019 →

The 2018 China Open was a tennis tournament played on outdoor hard courts. It was the 19th edition of the China Open for the men (22nd for the women). It was part of ATP World Tour 500 series on the 2018 ATP World Tour, and the last WTA Premier Mandatory tournament of the 2018 WTA Tour. Both the men's and the women's events were held at the National Tennis Center in Beijing, China, from October 1 to October 7, 2018.

== Points and prize money ==
=== Point distribution ===
Event	W	F	SF	QF	Round of 16	Round of 32	Round of 64	Q	Q2	Q1
Men's singles	500	300	180	90	45	0	—	20	10	0
Men's doubles	500	300	180	90	0	—	—	45	25	0
Women's singles	1,000	650	390	215	120	65	10	30	20	2
Women's doubles	1,000	650	390	215	120	10	—	—	—	—

=== Prize money ===
Event	W	F	SF	QF	Round of 16	Round of 32	Round of 64	Q2	Q1
Men's singles	$733,320	$359,510	$180,900	$92,000	$47,480	$25,200	—	$5,575	$2,845
Men's doubles	$220,790	$108,100	$54,220	$27,830	$14,380	—	—	—	—
Women's singles	$1,525,245	$763,255	$372,400	$178,895	$86,095	$41,610	$23,945	$6,375	$3,705
Women's doubles	$516,020	$258,935	$115,275	$53,200	$24,830	$11,530	—	—	—

== ATP singles main-draw entrants ==
=== Seeds ===
Country	Player	Rank^{1}	Seed
ARG	Juan Martín del Potro	4	1
GER	Alexander Zverev	5	2
BUL	Grigor Dimitrov	7	3
ITA	Fabio Fognini	13	4
GBR	Kyle Edmund	16	5
USA	Jack Sock	17	6
CRO	Borna Ćorić	18	7
ITA	Marco Cecchinato	22	8

- ^{1} Rankings are as of September 24, 2018

=== Other entrants ===
The following players received wildcards into the singles main draw:

- (Cyprus) Marcos Baghdatis
- (Spain) Feliciano López
- (China) Wu Yibing

The following player received entry as a special exempt:

- (Portugal) João Sousa

The following players received entry from the qualifying draw:

- (Moldova) Radu Albot
- (Italy) Matteo Berrettini
- (Serbia) Dušan Lajović
- (Canada) Vasek Pospisil

The following player received entry as an alternate:

- (Tunisia) Malek Jaziri

The following player received entry as a lucky loser:

- (United States) Tennys Sandgren

=== Withdrawals ===
Before the tournament

- (Spain) Pablo Carreño Busta → replaced by (Italy) Andreas Seppi
- (United States) Ryan Harrison → replaced by (United States) Tennys Sandgren
- (United States) John Isner → replaced by (Germany) Mischa Zverev
- (United Kingdom) Andy Murray → replaced by (Tunisia) Malek Jaziri
- (Spain) Rafael Nadal → replaced by (Germany) Peter Gojowczyk

During the tournament

- (Italy) Fabio Fognini

== ATP doubles main-draw entrants ==
=== Seeds ===
Country	Player	Country	Player	Rank^{1}	Seed
AUT	Oliver Marach	CRO	Mate Pavić	7	1
POL	Łukasz Kubot	BRA	Marcelo Melo	11	2
COL	Juan Sebastián Cabal	COL	Robert Farah	19	3
CRO	Ivan Dodig	CRO	Nikola Mektić	41	4

- Rankings are as of September 24, 2018

=== Other entrants ===
The following pairs received wildcards into the doubles main draw:

- (China) Gong Maoxin / (China) Zhang Ze
- (China) Hua Runhao / (China) Zhang Zhizhen

The following pair received entry from the qualifying draw:

- (Ukraine) Denys Molchanov / (Slovakia) Igor Zelenay

== WTA singles main-draw entrants ==
=== Seeds ===
The following are the seeded players. Seedings are based on WTA rankings as of 24 September 2018. Rankings and points before are as of 1 October 2018.

Seed	Rank	Player	Points before	Points defending	Points won	Points after	Status
1	1	(Romania) Simona Halep	8,061	650	10	7,421	First round retired against (Tunisia) Ons Jabeur [Q]
2	2	(Denmark) Caroline Wozniacki	5,610	120	1000	6,490	Champion, defeated (Latvia) Anastasija Sevastova
3	3	(Germany) Angelique Kerber	5,345	65	120	5,400	Third round lost to (China) Zhang Shuai
4	8	(France) Caroline Garcia	3,925	1,000	120	3,045	Third round lost to (Belarus) Aryna Sabalenka
5	4	(Czech Republic) Petra Kvitová	4,635	390	10	4,255	First round lost to (Australia) Daria Gavrilova
6	5	(Ukraine) Elina Svitolina	4,555	215	10	4,350	First round lost to (Serbia) Aleksandra Krunić
7	7	(Czech Republic) Karolína Plíšková	4,345	120	120	4,345	Third round lost to (China) Wang Qiang [WC]
8	6	(Japan) Naomi Osaka	4,390	10	390	4,770	Semifinals lost to (Latvia) Anastasija Sevastova
9	9	(United States) Sloane Stephens	3,912	10	120	4,022	Third round lost to (Slovakia) Dominika Cibulková
10	10	(Germany) Julia Görges	3,730	65	120	3,785	Third round lost to (Japan) Naomi Osaka [8]
11	11	(Netherlands) Kiki Bertens	3,630	10	120	3,740	Third round lost to (Czech Republic) Kateřina Siniaková [Q]
12	13	(Latvia) Jeļena Ostapenko	3,188	390	65	2,863	Second round lost to (China) Wang Qiang [WC]
13	12	(Russia) Daria Kasatkina	3,355	215	10	3,150	First round retired against (Germany) Laura Siegemund [PR]
14	15	(Spain) Garbiñe Muguruza	3,115	10	65	3,170	Second round lost to (Belarus) Aryna Sabalenka
15	14	(Belgium) Elise Mertens	3,170	65	10	3,115	First round lost to (China) Zhang Shuai
~~16~~	~~19~~	~~(Australia) Ashleigh Barty~~	2,615	10	0	2,605	Withdrew due to right arm injury
17	18	(United States) Madison Keys	2,751	0	65	2,816	Second round, withdrew due to left knee injury

=== Other entrants ===
The following players received wildcards into the singles main draw:

- (China) Duan Yingying
- (Australia) Samantha Stosur
- (China) Wang Qiang
- (China) Wang Yafan
- (China) Zheng Saisai

The following players received entry using a protected ranking into the singles main draw:

- (Switzerland) Timea Bacsinszky
- (Germany) Laura Siegemund

The following players received entry from the qualifying draw:

- (United Kingdom) Katie Boulter
- (Kazakhstan) Zarina Diyas
- (Slovenia) Polona Hercog
- (Tunisia) Ons Jabeur
- (Germany) Andrea Petkovic
- (Kazakhstan) Yulia Putintseva
- (Czech Republic) Kateřina Siniaková
- (Ukraine) Dayana Yastremska

The following players received entry as lucky losers:

- (Romania) Sorana Cîrstea
- (United States) Bernarda Pera

=== Withdrawals ===
Before the tournament

- (Australia) Ashleigh Barty → replaced by (Romania) Sorana Cîrstea and (United States) Bernarda Pera (Note: Barty earned a bye into the second round after reaching the semifinals in Wuhan; her withdrawal removed the bye and created two spots in the draw.)
- (Poland) Agnieszka Radwańska → replaced by (Belgium) Kirsten Flipkens
- (Russia) Maria Sharapova → replaced by (Croatia) Petra Martić
- (United States) Serena Williams → replaced by (Russia) Ekaterina Makarova
- (United States) Venus Williams → replaced by (Serbia) Aleksandra Krunić

During the tournament

- (United States) Madison Keys

=== Retirements ===
- (Romania) Simona Halep
- (Russia) Daria Kasatkina
- (Ukraine) Lesia Tsurenko

== WTA doubles main-draw entrants ==
=== Seeds ===
Country	Player	Country	Player	Rank^{1}	Seed
HUN	Tímea Babos	FRA	Kristina Mladenovic	6	1
CZE	Andrea Sestini Hlaváčková	CZE	Barbora Strýcová	15	2
CAN	Gabriela Dabrowski	CHN	Xu Yifan	25	3
BEL	Elise Mertens	NED	Demi Schuurs	27	4
USA	Nicole Melichar	CZE	Květa Peschke	31	5
SLO	Andreja Klepač	ESP	María José Martínez Sánchez	32	6
CZE	Lucie Hradecká	RUS	Ekaterina Makarova	42	7
TPE	Chan Hao-ching	CHN	Yang Zhaoxuan	55	8

- ^{1} Rankings are as of September 24, 2018

=== Other entrants ===
The following pairs received wildcards into the doubles main draw:

- (China) Duan Yingying / (China) Wang Yafan
- (United Kingdom) Johanna Konta / (China) Zhang Shuai

The following pairs received entry as alternates:

- (France) Alizé Cornet / (Croatia) Petra Martić
- (Poland) Magda Linette / (China) Zheng Saisai

=== Withdrawals ===
Before the tournament

- (Australia) Daria Gavrilova
- (China) Wang Qiang

== Champions ==
=== Men's singles ===
- (Georgia (country)) Nikoloz Basilashvili def. (Argentina) Juan Martín del Potro, 6–4, 6–4

=== Women's singles ===
- (Denmark) Caroline Wozniacki def. (Latvia) Anastasija Sevastova, 6–3, 6–3

=== Men's doubles ===
- (Poland) Łukasz Kubot / (Brazil) Marcelo Melo def. (Austria) Oliver Marach / (Croatia) Mate Pavić, 6–1, 6–4

=== Women's doubles ===
- (Czech Republic) Andrea Sestini Hlaváčková / (Czech Republic) Barbora Strýcová def. (Canada) Gabriela Dabrowski / (China) Xu Yifan, 4–6, 6–4, [10–8]
