= 2018 China Open – Women's singles =

Women's singles
- 2018 China Open

Final
- Champion: (Denmark) Caroline Wozniacki
- Runner-up: (Latvia) Anastasija Sevastova
- Score: 6–3, 6–3

Details
- Draw: 64
- Seeds: 16

Events
Singles	men	women
Doubles	men	women
- China Open

Caroline Wozniacki defeated Anastasija Sevastova in the final, 6–3, 6–3 to win the women's singles tennis title at the 2018 China Open. It was Wozniacki's 30th WTA Tour title.

Caroline Garcia was the defending champion, but lost in the third round to Aryna Sabalenka.

== Seeds ==
1. (Romania) Simona Halep (first round, retired)
2. (Denmark) Caroline Wozniacki (champion)
3. (Germany) Angelique Kerber (third round)
4. (France) Caroline Garcia (third round)
5. (Czech Republic) Petra Kvitová (first round)
6. (Ukraine) Elina Svitolina (first round)
7. (Czech Republic) Karolína Plíšková (third round)
8. (Japan) Naomi Osaka (semifinals)
9. (United States) Sloane Stephens (third round)
10. (Germany) Julia Görges (third round)
11. (Netherlands) Kiki Bertens (third round)
12. (Latvia) Jeļena Ostapenko (second round)
13. (Russia) Daria Kasatkina (first round, retired)
14. (Spain) Garbiñe Muguruza (second round)
15. (Belgium) Elise Mertens (first round)
16. (Australia) Ashleigh Barty (withdrew)
17. (United States) Madison Keys (second round, withdrew)

Click on the seed number of a player to go to their draw section.

The four Wuhan semifinalists received a bye into the second round. They were as follows:

- ~~(Australia) Ashleigh Barty~~
- (Estonia) Anett Kontaveit
- (Belarus) Aryna Sabalenka
- (China) Wang Qiang

== Draw ==
Key

- Q = Qualifier
- WC = Wild card
- LL = Lucky loser
- Alt = Alternate
- ITF = ITF entry
- PR = Protected ranking
- SR = Special ranking
- SE = Special exempt
- JE = Junior exempt
- JR = Junior Accelerator Programme entrant
- CO = College Accelerator Programme entrant
- NG = Next Gen Accelerator Program entrant
- w/o = Walkover
- r = Retired
- d = Defaulted

=== Finals ===
Quarterfinals
(Latvia) Anastasija Sevastova	6	7^{7}
(Slovakia) Dominika Cibulková	3	6^{5}
(China) Zhang Shuai	6	4	5
8	(Japan) Naomi Osaka	3	6	7
WC	(China) Wang Qiang	7	7
(Belarus) Aryna Sabalenka	5	5
Q	(Czech Republic) Kateřina Siniaková	2	2
2	(Denmark) Caroline Wozniacki	6	6

Semifinals
(Latvia) Anastasija Sevastova	6	6
8	(Japan) Naomi Osaka	4	4
WC	(China) Wang Qiang	1	3
2	(Denmark) Caroline Wozniacki	6	6

Final
(Latvia) Anastasija Sevastova	3	3
2	(Denmark) Caroline Wozniacki	6	6

=== Top half ===
==== Section 1 ====
First round
1	(Romania) S Halep	1	0^{r}
Q	(Tunisia) O Jabeur	6	0
(Greece) M Sakkari	1	4
(Croatia) D Vekić	6	6
(Latvia) A Sevastova	6	6
(France) A Cornet	4	2
LL	(United States) B Pera	3	4
17	(United States) M Keys	6	6
9	(United States) S Stephens	6^{8}	6	6
(Russia) A Pavlyuchenkova	7^{10}	4	4
WC	(China) S Zheng	6	6
Q	(Ukraine) D Yastremska	4	3
WC	(China) Y Duan	3	2
(Slovakia) D Cibulková	6	6
(Australia) D Gavrilova	6	6
5	(Czech Republic) P Kvitová	2	1

Second round
Q	(Tunisia) O Jabeur	6^{5}	4
(Croatia) D Vekić	7^{7}	6
(Latvia) A Sevastova	w/o
17	(United States) M Keys
9	(United States) S Stephens	6	6
WC	(China) S Zheng	1	3
(Slovakia) D Cibulková	6	6
(Australia) D Gavrilova	3	3

Third round
(Croatia) D Vekić	3	2
(Latvia) A Sevastova	6	6
9	(United States) S Stephens	6	2	3
(Slovakia) D Cibulková	4	6	6

Quarterfinals
(Latvia) A Sevastova	6	7^{7}
(Slovakia) D Cibulková	3	6^{5}

==== Section 2 ====
First round
3	(Germany) A Kerber	6	6
(France) K Mladenovic	2	2
Q	(Kazakhstan) Y Putintseva	1	0
(Spain) C Suárez Navarro	6	6
(Hungary) T Babos	6	6
(Chinese Taipei) S-w Hsieh	2	2
(China) S Zhang	6	3	6
15	(Belgium) E Mertens	1	6	3
10	(Germany) J Görges	6	4	6
(United Kingdom) J Konta	2	6	3
Q	(Germany) A Petkovic	2	6^{2}
(Ukraine) L Tsurenko	6	7^{7}
(United States) D Collins	6	3	6
PR	(Switzerland) T Bacsinszky	2	6	3
Q	(Kazakhstan) Z Diyas	4	3
8	(Japan) N Osaka	6	6

Second round
3	(Germany) A Kerber	7^{7}	6
(Spain) C Suárez Navarro	6^{4}	1
(Hungary) T Babos	1	2
(China) S Zhang	6	6
10	(Germany) J Görges	6	4	2
(Ukraine) L Tsurenko	4	6	2^{r}
(United States) D Collins	1	0
8	(Japan) N Osaka	6	6

Third round
3	(Germany) A Kerber	1	6	0
(China) S Zhang	6	2	6
10	(Germany) J Görges	1	2
8	(Japan) N Osaka	6	6

Quarterfinals
(China) S Zhang	6	4	5
8	(Japan) N Osaka	3	6	7

=== Bottom half ===
==== Section 3 ====
First round
7	(Czech Republic) Ka Plíšková	6	6
WC	(Australia) S Stosur	4	4
(Belarus) A Sasnovich	6	6
(Romania) M Buzărnescu	3	1
(Slovakia) M Rybáriková	4	6^{3}
12	(Latvia) J Ostapenko	6	7^{7}
14	(Spain) G Muguruza	6	6
(Russia) E Makarova	0	4
(United States) C Vandeweghe	2	1
Q	(Slovenia) P Hercog	6	6
WC	(China) Y Wang	6^{10}	7^{7}	3
4	(France) C Garcia	7^{12}	6^{4}	6

Second round
7	(Czech Republic) Ka Plíšková	6	6
(Belarus) A Sasnovich	3	4
WC	(China) Q Wang	6	6
12	(Latvia) J Ostapenko	0	0
14	(Spain) G Muguruza	5	4
(Belarus) A Sabalenka	7	6
Q	(Slovenia) P Hercog	6^{2}	3
4	(France) C Garcia	7^{7}	6

Third round
7	(Czech Republic) Ka Plíšková	4	4
WC	(China) Q Wang	6	6
(Belarus) A Sabalenka	5	7^{7}	6
4	(France) C Garcia	7	6^{3}	0

Quarterfinals
WC	(China) Q Wang	7	7
(Belarus) A Sabalenka	5	5

==== Section 4 ====
First round
6	(Ukraine) E Svitolina	6	4	6^{4}
(Serbia) A Krunić	0	6	7^{7}
(Belgium) A Van Uytvanck	5	4
Q	(Czech Republic) K Siniaková	7	6
(Belgium) K Flipkens	4	6	7
Q	(United Kingdom) K Boulter	6	2	5
LL	(Romania) S Cîrstea	2	0
11	(Netherlands) K Bertens	6	6
13	(Russia) D Kasatkina	3	2^{r}
PR	(Germany) L Siegemund	6	4
(Croatia) P Martić	6	6
(Czech Republic) B Strýcová	2	3
(Switzerland) B Bencic	2	3
2	(Denmark) C Wozniacki	6	6

Second round
(Serbia) A Krunić	6^{2}	2
Q	(Czech Republic) K Siniaková	7^{7}	6
(Belgium) K Flipkens	1	1
11	(Netherlands) K Bertens	6	6
PR	(Germany) L Siegemund	6	3	2
(Estonia) A Kontaveit	2	6	6
(Croatia) P Martić	5	3
2	(Denmark) C Wozniacki	7	6

Third round
Q	(Czech Republic) K Siniaková	6	6
11	(Netherlands) K Bertens	4	3
(Estonia) A Kontaveit	5	4
2	(Denmark) C Wozniacki	7	6

Quarterfinals
Q	(Czech Republic) K Siniaková	2	2
2	(Denmark) C Wozniacki	6	6

== Qualifying ==
=== Seeds ===
1. (Australia) Ajla Tomljanović (qualifying competition)
2. (Kazakhstan) Yulia Putintseva (qualified)
3. (Czech Republic) Kateřina Siniaková (qualified)
4. (Puerto Rico) Monica Puig (first round)
5. (Romania) Sorana Cîrstea (qualifying competition, lucky loser)
6. (United States) Sofia Kenin (first round)
7. (United States) Alison Riske (first round)
8. (Germany) Andrea Petkovic (qualified)
9. (Poland) Magda Linette (first round)
10. (United States) Bernarda Pera (qualifying competition, lucky loser)
11. (Spain) Lara Arruabarrena (qualifying competition)
12. (Germany) Tatjana Maria (qualifying competition)
13. (Romania) Ana Bogdan (first round)
14. (Romania) Monica Niculescu (first round)
15. (Slovenia) Polona Hercog (qualified)
16. (Spain) Sara Sorribes Tormo (qualifying competition)

=== Qualifiers ===
1. (Ukraine) Dayana Yastremska
2. (Kazakhstan) Yulia Putintseva
3. (Czech Republic) Kateřina Siniaková
4. (Tunisia) Ons Jabeur
5. (Slovenia) Polona Hercog
6. (Kazakhstan) Zarina Diyas
7. (United Kingdom) Katie Boulter
8. (Germany) Andrea Petkovic

=== Lucky losers ===
1. (Romania) Sorana Cîrstea
2. (United States) Bernarda Pera

=== Draw ===
==== First qualifier ====
First round
1	(Australia) Ajla Tomljanović	6	6
(Luxembourg) Mandy Minella	2	2
(Ukraine) Dayana Yastremska	6	6
13	(Romania) Ana Bogdan	2	4

Qualifying competition
1	(Australia) Ajla Tomljanović	2	6	2
(Ukraine) Dayana Yastremska	6	3	6

==== Second qualifier ====
First round
2	(Kazakhstan) Yulia Putintseva	6	6
WC	(China) Xu Yifan	4	0
(United States) Christina McHale	7^{7}	7
9	(Poland) Magda Linette	6^{3}	5

Qualifying competition
2	(Kazakhstan) Yulia Putintseva	7^{8}	6
(United States) Christina McHale	6^{6}	4

==== Third qualifier ====
First round
3	(Czech Republic) Kateřina Siniaková	6	6
WC	(China) Xun Fangying	4	3
WC	(China) Liu Fangzhou	1	4
10	(United States) Bernarda Pera	6	6

Qualifying competition
3	(Czech Republic) Kateřina Siniaková	6	6
10	(United States) Bernarda Pera	2	4

==== Fourth qualifier ====
First round
4	(Puerto Rico) Monica Puig	3	2
(Tunisia) Ons Jabeur	6	6
(United States) Amanda Anisimova	6	2	0
12	(Germany) Tatjana Maria	2	6	6

Qualifying competition
(Tunisia) Ons Jabeur	6	6
12	(Germany) Tatjana Maria	4	1

==== Fifth qualifier ====
First round
5	(Romania) Sorana Cîrstea	4	6	7^{7}
(United States) Varvara Lepchenko	6	4	6^{2}
WC	(Australia) Lizette Cabrera	4	2
15	(Slovenia) Polona Hercog	6	6

Qualifying competition
5	(Romania) Sorana Cîrstea	6	1	3
15	(Slovenia) Polona Hercog	3	6	6

==== Sixth qualifier ====
First round
6	(United States) Sofia Kenin	3	6	3
(United Kingdom) Heather Watson	6	4	6
(Kazakhstan) Zarina Diyas	7^{7}	3	6
14	(Romania) Monica Niculescu	6^{4}	6	4

Qualifying competition
(United Kingdom) Heather Watson	0	3
(Kazakhstan) Zarina Diyas	6	6

==== Seventh qualifier ====
First round
7	(United States) Alison Riske	6	3	2
(United Kingdom) Katie Boulter	4	6	6
(United States) Caroline Dolehide	6	4	4
11	(Spain) Lara Arruabarrena	4	6	6

Qualifying competition
(United Kingdom) Katie Boulter	6	6
11	(Spain) Lara Arruabarrena	3	2

==== Eighth qualifier ====
First round
8	(Germany) Andrea Petkovic	6	6
(China) Zhu Lin	1	4
(United States) Jennifer Brady	6^{5}	6	1
16	(Spain) Sara Sorribes Tormo	7^{7}	2	6

Qualifying competition
8	(Germany) Andrea Petkovic	4	6	6
16	(Spain) Sara Sorribes Tormo	6	1	4
