= 2023 China Open – Women's doubles =

Women's doubles
- 2023 China Open

Final
- Champions: (Czech Republic) Marie Bouzková (Spain) Sara Sorribes Tormo
- Runners-up: (Chinese Taipei) Chan Hao-ching (Mexico) Giuliana Olmos
- Score: 3–6, 6–0, [10–4]

Events
Singles	men	women
Doubles	men	women
← 2019 ·	China Open	· 2024 →

Marie Bouzková and Sara Sorribes Tormo defeated Chan Hao-ching and Giuliana Olmos in the final, 3–6, 6–0, [10–4] to win the women's doubles tennis title at the 2023 China Open.

Sofia Kenin and Bethanie Mattek-Sands were the reigning champions from 2019, when the event was last held, but Kenin did not compete in the doubles tournament this year. Mattek-Sands partnered with Sorana Cîrstea, but lost in the first round to Chan and Olmos.

Elise Mertens retained the WTA No. 1 doubles ranking despite losing in the second round. Kateřina Siniaková, Coco Gauff and Jessica Pegula were also in contention for the top ranking, but they also lost in the second round.

== Seeds ==
The top four seeds received a bye into the second round.

1. (Australia) Storm Hunter / (Belgium) Elise Mertens (second round)
2. (United States) Coco Gauff / (United States) Jessica Pegula (second round)
3. (Czech Republic) Barbora Krejčíková / (Czech Republic) Kateřina Siniaková (second round)
4. (Canada) Gabriela Dabrowski / (New Zealand) Erin Routliffe (second round)
5. (United States) Desirae Krawczyk / (Netherlands) Demi Schuurs (first round)
6. (Chinese Taipei) Hsieh Su-wei / (China) Wang Xinyu (first round)
7. (Japan) Shuko Aoyama / (Japan) Ena Shibahara (first round)
8. (Germany) Laura Siegemund / Vera Zvonareva (quarterfinals)

== Draw ==
=== Key ===
- Q = Qualifier
- WC = Wild card
- LL = Lucky loser
- Alt = Alternate
- SE = Special exempt
- PR = Protected ranking
- ITF = ITF entry
- JE = Junior exempt
- w/o = Walkover
- r = Retired
- d = Defaulted
- SR = Special ranking

=== Finals ===
Semifinals
(Chinese Taipei) Chan Hao-ching (Mexico) Giuliana Olmos	7	6
(Poland) Magda Linette (United States) Peyton Stearns	5	4
(Czech Republic) Marie Bouzková (Spain) Sara Sorribes Tormo	6	6
(Brazil) Ingrid Gamarra Martins (Brazil) Luisa Stefani	2	2

Final
(Chinese Taipei) Chan Hao-ching (Mexico) Giuliana Olmos	6	0	[4]
(Czech Republic) Marie Bouzková (Spain) Sara Sorribes Tormo	3	6	[10]

=== Top half ===
First round
(Romania) S Cîrstea (United States) B Mattek-Sands	3	4
(Chinese Taipei) H-c Chan (Mexico) G Olmos	6	6
WC	(China) H Guo (China) X Jiang	7	7
(Italy) J Paolini (Egypt) M Sherif	5	5
(Slovakia) T Mihalíková (China) Y Xu	6	1	[10]
5	(United States) D Krawczyk (Netherlands) D Schuurs	4	6	[6]
(Poland) M Linette (United States) P Stearns	6	7^{7}
Alt	(Italy) E Cocciaretto (Italy) M Trevisan	1	6^{5}
(Kazakhstan) A Danilina; A Panova	4	6	[7]
(Brazil) B Haddad Maia; V Kudermetova	6	4	[10]
(Ukraine) N Kichenok (Romania) M Niculescu	6	6
7	(Japan) S Aoyama (Japan) E Shibahara	3	3

Second round
1	(Australia) S Hunter (Belgium) E Mertens	1	2
(Chinese Taipei) H-c Chan (Mexico) G Olmos	6	6
WC	(China) H Guo (China) X Jiang	2	2
(Slovakia) T Mihalíková (China) Y Xu	6	6
4	(Canada) G Dabrowski (New Zealand) E Routliffe	2	6^{3}
(Poland) M Linette (United States) P Stearns	6	7^{7}
(Brazil) B Haddad Maia; V Kudermetova	6	6
(Ukraine) N Kichenok (Romania) M Niculescu	0	3

Quarterfinals
(Chinese Taipei) H-c Chan (Mexico) G Olmos	6	6
(Slovakia) T Mihalíková (China) Y Xu	1	4
(Poland) M Linette (United States) P Stearns	1	7^{7}	[10]
(Brazil) B Haddad Maia; V Kudermetova	6	6^{3}	[8]

Semifinals
(Chinese Taipei) H-c Chan (Mexico) G Olmos	7	6
(Poland) M Linette (United States) P Stearns	5	4

=== Bottom half ===
First round
6	(Chinese Taipei) S-w Hsieh (China) Xin Wang	2	7^{7}	[3]
(Czech Republic) M Bouzková (Spain) S Sorribes Tormo	6	6^{3}	[10]
WC	(China) Xiy Wang (China) Y Yuan	6	6
(Ukraine) L Kichenok (Latvia) J Ostapenko	1	3
(Georgia (country)) O Kalashnikova (Czech Republic) M Kolodziejová	1	2
(United States) N Melichar-Martinez (Australia) E Perez	6	6
8	(Germany) L Siegemund; V Zvonareva	7	7^{7}
(Japan) M Kato (Indonesia) A Sutjiadi	5	6^{4}
(United States) A Parks (Belgium) Y Wickmayer	6	6^{5}	[6]
WC	(France) C Garcia (France) K Mladenovic	2	7^{7}	[10]
(Brazil) I Gamarra Martins (Brazil) L Stefani	6	4	[10]
(Chinese Taipei) L Chan; Y Sizikova	2	6	[4]

Second round
(Czech Republic) M Bouzková (Spain) S Sorribes Tormo	6	6
WC	(China) Xiy Wang (China) Y Yuan	4	3
(United States) N Melichar-Martinez (Australia) E Perez	7	2	[10]
3	(Czech Republic) B Krejčíková (Czech Republic) K Siniaková	5	6	[6]
8	(Germany) L Siegemund; V Zvonareva	7^{7}	6
WC	(France) C Garcia (France) K Mladenovic	6^{4}	1
(Brazil) I Gamarra Martins (Brazil) L Stefani	5	6	[10]
2	(United States) C Gauff (United States) J Pegula	7	2	[5]

Quarterfinals
(Czech Republic) M Bouzková (Spain) S Sorribes Tormo	6	7^{7}
(United States) N Melichar-Martinez (Australia) E Perez	4	6^{5}
8	(Germany) L Siegemund; V Zvonareva	2	3
(Brazil) I Gamarra Martins (Brazil) L Stefani	6	6

Semifinals
(Czech Republic) M Bouzková (Spain) S Sorribes Tormo	6	6
(Brazil) I Gamarra Martins (Brazil) L Stefani	2	2
