= 2018 China Open – Women's doubles =

Women's doubles
- 2018 China Open

Final
- Champions: (Czech Republic) Andrea Sestini Hlaváčková (Czech Republic) Barbora Strýcová
- Runners-up: (Canada) Gabriela Dabrowski (China) Xu Yifan
- Score: 4–6, 6–4, [10–8]

Events
Singles	men	women
Doubles	men	women
← 2017 ·	China Open	· 2019 →

Latisha Chan and Martina Hingis were the defending champions, but Hingis retired from professional tennis at the end of 2017 and Chan could not participate due to a medical condition.

Andrea Sestini Hlaváčková and Barbora Strýcová won the title, defeating Gabriela Dabrowski and Xu Yifan in the final, 4–6, 6–4, [10–8].

== Seeds ==
The top four seeds received a bye into the second round.

1. (Hungary) Tímea Babos / (France) Kristina Mladenovic (quarterfinals)
2. (Czech Republic) Andrea Sestini Hlaváčková / (Czech Republic) Barbora Strýcová (champions)
3. (Canada) Gabriela Dabrowski / (China) Xu Yifan (final)
4. (Belgium) Elise Mertens / (Netherlands) Demi Schuurs (semifinals)
5. (United States) Nicole Melichar / (Czech Republic) Květa Peschke (quarterfinals)
6. (Slovenia) Andreja Klepač / (Spain) María José Martínez Sánchez (quarterfinals)
7. (Czech Republic) Lucie Hradecká / (Russia) Ekaterina Makarova (semifinals)
8. (Chinese Taipei) Chan Hao-ching / (China) Yang Zhaoxuan (first round)

== Draw ==
=== Key ===
- Q = Qualifier
- WC = Wild card
- LL = Lucky loser
- Alt = Alternate
- SE = Special exempt
- PR = Protected ranking
- ITF = ITF entry
- JE = Junior exempt
- w/o = Walkover
- r = Retired
- d = Defaulted
- SR = Special ranking

=== Finals ===
Semifinals
7	(Czech Republic) Lucie Hradecká (Russia) Ekaterina Makarova	3	2
3	(Canada) Gabriela Dabrowski (China) Xu Yifan	6	6
4	(Belgium) Elise Mertens (Netherlands) Demi Schuurs	0	5
2	(Czech Republic) Andrea Sestini Hlaváčková (Czech Republic) Barbora Strýcová	6	7

Final
3	(Canada) Gabriela Dabrowski (China) Xu Yifan	6	4	[8]
2	(Czech Republic) Andrea Sestini Hlaváčková (Czech Republic) Barbora Strýcová	4	6	[10]

=== Top half ===
First round
(United States) D Krawczyk (United States) S Santamaria	5	6	[7]
Alt	(France) A Cornet (Croatia) P Martić	7	3	[10]
(Ukraine) L Kichenok (Slovenia) K Srebotnik	7^{7}	6
(Japan) M Kato (Japan) M Ninomiya	6^{4}	4
(Belgium) K Flipkens (Romania) R Olaru	2	6	[7]
7	(Czech Republic) L Hradecká (Russia) E Makarova	6	2	[10]
Alt	(Poland) M Linette (China) S Zheng	6	3	[8]
(Ukraine) N Kichenok (Australia) An Rodionova	3	6	[10]
(Poland) A Rosolska (United States) A Spears	6	4	[10]
(Australia) M Adamczak (United Kingdom) H Watson	4	6	[7]
(Romania) M Buzărnescu (Romania) M Niculescu	6	6
8	(Chinese Taipei) H-c Chan (China) Z Yang	3	3

Second round
1	(Hungary) T Babos (France) K Mladenovic	7^{7}	6
Alt	(France) A Cornet (Croatia) P Martić	6^{3}	2
(Ukraine) L Kichenok (Slovenia) K Srebotnik	6	4	[9]
7	(Czech Republic) L Hradecká (Russia) E Makarova	3	6	[11]
3	(Canada) G Dabrowski (China) Y Xu	7	6
(Ukraine) N Kichenok (Australia) An Rodionova	5	1
(Poland) A Rosolska (United States) A Spears	4	6	[11]
(Romania) M Buzărnescu (Romania) M Niculescu	6	4	[9]

Quarterfinals
1	(Hungary) T Babos (France) K Mladenovic	4	6	[5]
7	(Czech Republic) L Hradecká (Russia) E Makarova	6	2	[10]
3	(Canada) G Dabrowski (China) Y Xu	6	7
(Poland) A Rosolska (United States) A Spears	2	5

Semifinals
7	(Czech Republic) L Hradecká (Russia) E Makarova	3	2
3	(Canada) G Dabrowski (China) Y Xu	6	6

=== Bottom half ===
First round
5	(United States) N Melichar (Czech Republic) K Peschke	6	4	[10]
WC	(China) Y Duan (China) Y Wang	1	6	[7]
(United States) K Christian (Georgia (country)) O Kalashnikova	5	6^{4}
(Spain) L Arruabarrena (Croatia) D Jurak	7	7^{7}
(Chinese Taipei) S-w Hsieh (United States) B Mattek-Sands	4	6	[10]
(Russia) A Pavlyuchenkova (Latvia) A Sevastova	6	3	[12]
6	(Slovenia) A Klepač (Spain) MJ Martínez Sánchez	6	6
(Switzerland) T Bacsinszky (Australia) A Tomljanović	3	3
(Japan) S Aoyama (Belarus) L Marozava	6	4	[3]
(United States) R Atawo (Germany) A-L Grönefeld	3	6	[10]
WC	(United Kingdom) J Konta (China) S Zhang	6	5	[6]
(Serbia) A Krunić (Czech Republic) K Siniaková	2	7	[10]

Second round
5	(United States) N Melichar (Czech Republic) K Peschke	6	6
(Spain) L Arruabarrena (Croatia) D Jurak	3	2
(Russia) A Pavlyuchenkova (Latvia) A Sevastova	5	2
4	(Belgium) E Mertens (Netherlands) D Schuurs	7	6
6	(Slovenia) A Klepač (Spain) MJ Martínez Sánchez	6^{5}	7	[10]
(United States) R Atawo (Germany) A-L Grönefeld	7^{7}	5	[7]
(Serbia) A Krunić (Czech Republic) K Siniaková	6	6^{3}	[4]
2	(Czech Republic) A Sestini Hlaváčková (Czech Republic) B Strýcová	2	7^{7}	[10]

Quarterfinals
5	(United States) N Melichar (Czech Republic) K Peschke	2	6	[8]
4	(Belgium) E Mertens (Netherlands) D Schuurs	6	3	[10]
6	(Slovenia) A Klepač (Spain) MJ Martínez Sánchez	3	0
2	(Czech Republic) A Sestini Hlaváčková (Czech Republic) B Strýcová	6	6

Semifinals
4	(Belgium) E Mertens (Netherlands) D Schuurs	0	5
2	(Czech Republic) A Sestini Hlaváčková (Czech Republic) B Strýcová	6	7
