= 2019 China Open – Women's doubles =

Women's doubles
- 2019 China Open

Final
- Champions: (United States) Sofia Kenin (United States) Bethanie Mattek-Sands
- Runners-up: (Latvia) Jeļena Ostapenko (Ukraine) Dayana Yastremska
- Score: 6–3, 6–7^{(5–7)}, [10–7]

Events
Singles	men	women
Doubles	men	women
← 2018 ·	China Open	· 2023 →

Andrea Sestini Hlaváčková and Barbora Strýcová were the defending champions, but Sestini Hlaváčková did not participate due to maternity leave. Strýcová played alongside Hsieh Su-wei, but lost in the second round to Jeļena Ostapenko and Dayana Yastremska.

Sofia Kenin and Bethanie Mattek-Sands won the title, defeating Ostapenko and Yastremska in the final, 6–3, 6–7^{(5–7)}, [10–7].

Kristina Mladenovic regained the WTA no. 1 doubles ranking from Strýcova after the end of the tournament. Elise Mertens was also in contention for the top ranking at the start of the tournament.

== Seeds ==
The top four seeds received a bye into the second round.

1. (Chinese Taipei) Hsieh Su-wei / (Czech Republic) Barbora Strýcová (second round)
2. (Hungary) Tímea Babos / (France) Kristina Mladenovic (quarterfinals)
3. (Belgium) Elise Mertens / (Belarus) Aryna Sabalenka (second round)
4. (Canada) Gabriela Dabrowski / (China) Xu Yifan (quarterfinals)
5. (Germany) Anna-Lena Grönefeld / (Netherlands) Demi Schuurs (quarterfinals)
6. (Chinese Taipei) Chan Hao-ching / (Chinese Taipei) Latisha Chan (second round)
7. (Australia) Samantha Stosur / (China) Zhang Shuai (second round)
8. (United States) Nicole Melichar / (Czech Republic) Květa Peschke (quarterfinals)

== Draw ==
=== Key ===
- Q = Qualifier
- WC = Wild card
- LL = Lucky loser
- Alt = Alternate
- SE = Special exempt
- PR = Protected ranking
- ITF = ITF entry
- JE = Junior exempt
- w/o = Walkover
- r = Retired
- d = Defaulted
- SR = Special ranking

=== Finals ===
Semifinals
(Latvia) Jeļena Ostapenko (Ukraine) Dayana Yastremska	4	6	[10]
(Czech Republic) Karolína Plíšková (Czech Republic) Kristýna Plíšková	6	4	[6]
WC	(United States) Sofia Kenin (United States) Bethanie Mattek-Sands	6	6
(Japan) Shuko Aoyama (Japan) Ena Shibahara	4	1

Final
(Latvia) Jeļena Ostapenko (Ukraine) Dayana Yastremska	3	7^{7}	[7]
WC	(United States) Sofia Kenin (United States) Bethanie Mattek-Sands	6	6^{5}	[10]

=== Top half ===
First round
(Latvia) J Ostapenko (Ukraine) D Yastremska	6	2	[10]
(United States) V King (Romania) M Niculescu	4	6	[4]
WC	(Japan) M Ninomiya (China) Z Yang	6^{3}	2
(Germany) J Görges (Latvia) A Sevastova	7^{7}	6
(United States) J Brady (Slovenia) K Srebotnik	2	6^{4}
8	(United States) N Melichar (Czech Republic) K Peschke	6	7^{7}
(Ukraine) K Bondarenko (Serbia) A Krunić	5	6	[8]
(Croatia) D Jurak (Spain) MJ Martínez Sánchez	7	3	[10]
(Czech Republic) Ka Plíšková (Czech Republic) Kr Plíšková	6	6
(Ukraine) L Kichenok (United States) D Krawczyk	4	2
(Poland) A Rosolska (Australia) S Sanders	6	3	[8]
7	(Australia) S Stosur (China) S Zhang	4	6	[10]

Second round
1	(Chinese Taipei) S-w Hsieh (Czech Republic) B Strýcová	4	4
(Latvia) J Ostapenko (Ukraine) D Yastremska	6	6
(Germany) J Görges (Latvia) A Sevastova	3	6^{6}
8	(United States) N Melichar (Czech Republic) K Peschke	6	7^{8}
4	(Canada) G Dabrowski (China) Y Xu	6	7
(Croatia) D Jurak (Spain) MJ Martínez Sánchez	3	5
(Czech Republic) Ka Plíšková (Czech Republic) Kr Plíšková	6	7
7	(Australia) S Stosur (China) S Zhang	1	5

Quarterfinals
(Latvia) J Ostapenko (Ukraine) D Yastremska	6	6
8	(United States) N Melichar (Czech Republic) K Peschke	2	2
4	(Canada) G Dabrowski (China) Y Xu	5	3
(Czech Republic) Ka Plíšková (Czech Republic) Kr Plíšková	7	6

Semifinals
(Latvia) J Ostapenko (Ukraine) D Yastremska	4	6	[10]
(Czech Republic) Ka Plíšková (Czech Republic) Kr Plíšková	6	4	[6]

=== Bottom half ===
First round
5	(Germany) A-L Grönefeld (Netherlands) D Schuurs	6	6
(Ukraine) N Kichenok (United States) A Spears	1	4
(Russia) V Kudermetova (Belarus) A Sasnovich	3	2
(Russia) E Alexandrova (Czech Republic) K Siniaková	6	6
WC	(United States) S Kenin (United States) B Mattek-Sands	5	6	[10]
(Romania) R Olaru (United States) A Riske	7	1	[4]
6	(Chinese Taipei) H-c Chan (Chinese Taipei) L Chan	6	6
(China) Y Duan (China) S Zheng	1	1
(Japan) S Aoyama (Japan) E Shibahara	6	6
(Russia) A Blinkova (Czech Republic) R Voráčová	4	4
WC	(China) S Peng (China) Y Wang	7	6
(Australia) M Adamczak (China) X Han	5	1

Second round
5	(Germany) A-L Grönefeld (Netherlands) D Schuurs	1	6	[10]
(Russia) E Alexandrova (Czech Republic) K Siniaková	6	3	[6]
WC	(United States) S Kenin (United States) B Mattek-Sands	6	7^{7}
3	(Belgium) E Mertens (Belarus) A Sabalenka	3	6^{5}
6	(Chinese Taipei) H-c Chan (Chinese Taipei) L Chan	5	4
(Japan) S Aoyama (Japan) E Shibahara	7	6
WC	(China) S Peng (China) Y Wang	2	1
2	(Hungary) T Babos (France) K Mladenovic	6	6

Quarterfinals
5	(Germany) A-L Grönefeld (Netherlands) D Schuurs	6	4	[8]
WC	(United States) S Kenin (United States) B Mattek-Sands	2	6	[10]
(Japan) S Aoyama (Japan) E Shibahara	6	6
2	(Hungary) T Babos (France) K Mladenovic	3	4

Semifinals
WC	(United States) S Kenin (United States) B Mattek-Sands	6	6
(Japan) S Aoyama (Japan) E Shibahara	4	1
