= 2019 China Open – Women's singles =

Women's singles
- 2019 China Open

Final
- Champion: (Japan) Naomi Osaka
- Runner-up: (Australia) Ashleigh Barty
- Score: 3–6, 6–3, 6–2

Details
- Draw: 64
- Seeds: 16

Events
Singles	men	women
Doubles	men	women
- China Open

Naomi Osaka defeated Ashleigh Barty in the final, 3–6, 6–3, 6–2 to win the women's singles tennis title at the 2019 China Open. It was Osaka's second Premier Mandatory-level title.

Caroline Wozniacki was the defending champion, but lost to Osaka in the semifinals.

Barty and Karolína Plíšková were in contention for the WTA no. 1 singles ranking at the start of the tournament. Barty retained the top ranking when Plíšková lost in the first round to Jeļena Ostapenko.

== Seeds ==
1. (Australia) Ashleigh Barty (final)
2. (Czech Republic) Karolína Plíšková (first round)
3. (Ukraine) Elina Svitolina (quarterfinals)
4. (Japan) Naomi Osaka (champion)
5. (Canada) Bianca Andreescu (quarterfinals)
6. (Romania) Simona Halep (second round)
7. (Czech Republic) Petra Kvitová (quarterfinals)
8. (Netherlands) Kiki Bertens (semifinals)

9. (Switzerland) Belinda Bencic (third round)
10. (Germany) Angelique Kerber (second round)
11. (United States) Madison Keys (second round)
12. (Belarus) Aryna Sabalenka (second round)
13. (United States) Sloane Stephens (second round)
14. (China) Wang Qiang (first round, retired)
15. (United States) Sofia Kenin (third round)
16. (Denmark) Caroline Wozniacki (semifinals)

Click on the seed number of a player to go to their draw section.

The four Wuhan semifinalists received a bye into the second round. They are as follows:

- (Australia) Ashleigh Barty
- (Czech Republic) Petra Kvitová
- (United States) Alison Riske
- (Belarus) Aryna Sabalenka

== Draw ==
Key

- Q = Qualifier
- WC = Wild card
- LL = Lucky loser
- Alt = Alternate
- ITF = ITF entry
- PR = Protected ranking
- SR = Special ranking
- SE = Special exempt
- JE = Junior exempt
- JR = Junior Accelerator Programme entrant
- CO = College Accelerator Programme entrant
- NG = Next Gen Accelerator Program entrant
- w/o = Walkover
- r = Retired
- d = Defaulted

=== Finals ===
Quarterfinals
1	(Australia) Ashleigh Barty	4	6	6
7	(Czech Republic) Petra Kvitová	6	4	3
3	(Ukraine) Elina Svitolina	6^{6}	2
8	(Netherlands) Kiki Bertens	7^{8}	6
5	(Canada) Bianca Andreescu	7	3	4
4	(Japan) Naomi Osaka	5	6	6
(Russia) Daria Kasatkina	3	6^{5}
16	(Denmark) Caroline Wozniacki	6	7^{7}

Semifinals
1	(Australia) Ashleigh Barty	6	3	7^{9}
8	(Netherlands) Kiki Bertens	3	6	6^{7}
4	(Japan) Naomi Osaka	6	6
16	(Denmark) Caroline Wozniacki	4	2

Final
1	(Australia) Ashleigh Barty	6	3	2
4	(Japan) Naomi Osaka	3	6	6

=== Top half ===
==== Section 1 ====
First round
(Kazakhstan) Y Putintseva	6	6
Q	(Russia) A Blinkova	0	1
(China) S Zheng	4	6	7^{7}
(Puerto Rico) M Puig	6	3	6^{5}
Q	(Poland) M Linette	5	3
13	(United States) S Stephens	7	6
9	(Switzerland) B Bencic	7	6
(Chinese Taipei) S-w Hsieh	5	2
(Czech Republic) B Strýcová	3	6	5
(United States) V Williams	6	4	7
(United States) D Collins	3	2
(France) K Mladenovic	6	6

Second round
1	(Australia) A Barty	6	6
(Kazakhstan) Y Putintseva	4	2
(China) S Zheng	6	6
13	(United States) S Stephens	3	1
9	(Switzerland) B Bencic	3	6	7
(United States) V Williams	6	3	5
(France) K Mladenovic	4	4
7	(Czech Republic) P Kvitová	6	6

Third round
1	(Australia) A Barty	6	6^{5}	6
(China) S Zheng	3	7^{7}	2
9	(Switzerland) B Bencic	3	3
7	(Czech Republic) P Kvitová	6	6

Quarterfinals
1	(Australia) A Barty	4	6	6
7	(Czech Republic) P Kvitová	6	4	3

==== Section 2 ====
First round
3	(Ukraine) E Svitolina	6^{4}	6	6
(Latvia) A Sevastova	7^{7}	1	2
WC	(China) Xin Wang	1	2
(China) Y Wang	6	6
(Russia) A Pavlyuchenkova	6	3	7^{7}
(Russia) V Kudermetova	0	6	6^{4}
(Spain) G Muguruza	0	6	2
15	(United States) S Kenin	6	2	6
10	(Germany) A Kerber	6	1	6
(China) S Zhang	2	6	4
(Slovenia) P Hercog	6^{4}	7^{7}	6
(Germany) J Görges	7^{7}	6^{5}	4
(France) C Garcia	1	1
(Ukraine) D Yastremska	6	6
(Croatia) D Vekić	6	1	6^{3}
8	(Netherlands) K Bertens	3	6	7^{7}

Second round
3	(Ukraine) E Svitolina	7^{7}	7^{7}
(China) Y Wang	6^{5}	6^{1}
(Russia) A Pavlyuchenkova	3	2
15	(United States) S Kenin	6	6
10	(Germany) A Kerber	4	2
(Slovenia) P Hercog	6	6
(Ukraine) D Yastremska	6^{5}	3
8	(Netherlands) K Bertens	7^{7}	6

Third round
3	(Ukraine) E Svitolina	6	6^{8}	6
15	(United States) S Kenin	3	7^{10}	3
(Slovenia) P Hercog	6^{6}	6	3
8	(Netherlands) K Bertens	7^{8}	2	6

Quarterfinals
3	(Ukraine) E Svitolina	6^{6}	2
8	(Netherlands) K Bertens	7^{8}	6

=== Bottom half ===
==== Section 3 ====
First round
5	(Canada) B Andreescu	6	2	6
(Belarus) A Sasnovich	2	6	1
(Belgium) E Mertens	6	6
(Croatia) P Martić	2	3
Q	(United States) J Brady	6^{4}	7^{7}	6
(United States) A Anisimova	7^{7}	6^{2}	3
(Czech Republic) K Muchová	4	6^{5}
11	(United States) M Keys	6	7^{7}
14	(China) Q Wang	7	5^{r}
(Australia) A Tomljanović	5	4
(Switzerland) J Teichmann	6^{4}	3
Q	(Germany) A Petkovic	7^{7}	6
(United States) J Pegula	3	6^{5}
4	(Japan) N Osaka	6	7^{7}

Second round
5	(Canada) B Andreescu	6	7^{7}
(Belgium) E Mertens	3	6^{5}
Q	(United States) J Brady	2	6	6
11	(United States) M Keys	6	4	4
(Australia) A Tomljanović	3	6	4
(United States) A Riske	6	3	6
Q	(Germany) A Petkovic	2	0
4	(Japan) N Osaka	6	6

Third round
5	(Canada) B Andreescu	6	6
Q	(United States) J Brady	1	3
(United States) A Riske	4	0
4	(Japan) N Osaka	6	6

Quarterfinals
5	(Canada) B Andreescu	7	3	4
4	(Japan) N Osaka	5	6	6

==== Section 4 ====
First round
6	(Romania) S Halep	6	6
Q	(Sweden) R Peterson	1	1
(Russia) E Alexandrova	5	6	6
Q	(United States) B Pera	7	2	4
(Russia) D Kasatkina	2	6	6
WC	(China) S Peng	6	4	4
16	(Denmark) C Wozniacki	6	6
Q	(United States) L Davis	1	3
Q	(United States) C McHale	6	1	6
WC	(Russia) S Kuznetsova	0	6	3
(Czech Republic) K Siniaková	6	6
WC	(China) Xiy Wang	2	2
WC	(Latvia) J Ostapenko	7	3	7
2	(Czech Republic) Ka Plíšková	5	6	5

Second round
6	(Romania) S Halep	2	3
(Russia) E Alexandrova	6	6
(Russia) D Kasatkina	6	7^{7}
12	(Belarus) A Sabalenka	4	6^{5}
16	(Denmark) C Wozniacki	6	6
Q	(United States) C McHale	4	0
(Czech Republic) K Siniaková	6	6
WC	(Latvia) J Ostapenko	2	1

Third round
(Russia) E Alexandrova	4	3
(Russia) D Kasatkina	6	6
16	(Denmark) C Wozniacki	7	6
(Czech Republic) K Siniaková	5	4

Quarterfinals
(Russia) D Kasatkina	3	6^{5}
16	(Denmark) C Wozniacki	6	7^{7}

== Qualifying ==
=== Seeds ===
1. (Poland) Magda Linette (qualified)
2. (Sweden) Rebecca Peterson (qualified)
3. (Tunisia) Ons Jabeur (first round)
4. (Czech Republic) Marie Bouzková (qualifying competition, retired)
5. (United States) Lauren Davis (qualified)
6. (Russia) Anna Blinkova (qualified)
7. (Slovenia) Tamara Zidanšek (qualifying competition)
8. (United States) Jennifer Brady (qualified)
9. (Russia) Anastasia Potapova (qualifying competition)
10. (Japan) Misaki Doi (qualifying competition)
11. (Ukraine) Kateryna Kozlova (qualifying competition)
12. (Kazakhstan) Zarina Diyas (qualifying competition)
13. (Czech Republic) Kristýna Plíšková (withdrew, still competing in Tashkent)
14. (United States) Bernarda Pera (qualified)
15. (Germany) Andrea Petkovic (qualified)
16. (Spain) Paula Badosa (first round)

=== Qualifiers ===
1. (Poland) Magda Linette
2. (Sweden) Rebecca Peterson
3. (United States) Bernarda Pera
4. (Germany) Andrea Petkovic
5. (United States) Lauren Davis
6. (Russia) Anna Blinkova
7. (United States) Christina McHale
8. (United States) Jennifer Brady

=== Draw ===
==== First qualifier ====
First round
1	(Poland) Magda Linette	6	6
(United States) Kristie Ahn	2	1
(United Kingdom) Heather Watson	6	6
16	(Spain) Paula Badosa	3	4

Qualifying competition
1	(Poland) Magda Linette	6	6
(United Kingdom) Heather Watson	2	1

==== Second qualifier ====
First round
2	(Sweden) Rebecca Peterson	7^{7}	6
(China) Xun Fangying	6^{4}	3
(United States) Nicole Gibbs	2	6	2
10	(Japan) Misaki Doi	6	3	6

Qualifying competition
2	(Sweden) Rebecca Peterson	6	6^{3}	6
10	(Japan) Misaki Doi	1	7^{7}	2

==== Third qualifier ====
First round
3	(Tunisia) Ons Jabeur	4	3
(China) Yuan Yue	6	6
WC	(China) Ma Shuyue	4	2
14	(United States) Bernarda Pera	6	6

Qualifying competition
(China) Yuan Yue	2	1
14	(United States) Bernarda Pera	6	6

==== Fourth qualifier ====
First round
4	(Czech Republic) Marie Bouzková	4	6	6
Alt	(China) Zhang Yuxuan	6	4	4
(China) Han Xinyun	1	1
15	(Germany) Andrea Petkovic	6	6

Qualifying competition
4	(Czech Republic) Marie Bouzková	5	1^{r}
15	(Germany) Andrea Petkovic	7	2

==== Fifth qualifier ====
First round
5	(United States) Lauren Davis	6	4	6
(Romania) Monica Niculescu	3	6	4
(Australia) Astra Sharma	4	3
9	(Russia) Anastasia Potapova	6	6

Qualifying competition
5	(United States) Lauren Davis	6	6
9	(Russia) Anastasia Potapova	2	1

==== Sixth qualifier ====
First round
6	(Russia) Anna Blinkova	6	6
(China) Zhu Lin	4	2
(Hungary) Tímea Babos	1	4
12	(Kazakhstan) Zarina Diyas	6	6

Qualifying competition
6	(Russia) Anna Blinkova	6	7
12	(Kazakhstan) Zarina Diyas	2	5

==== Seventh qualifier ====
First round
7	(Slovenia) Tamara Zidanšek	6	4	7^{7}
(Australia) Samantha Stosur	2	6	6^{1}
(United States) Christina McHale	6	6
Alt	(China) You Xiaodi	3	0

Qualifying competition
7	(Slovenia) Tamara Zidanšek	5	6^{7}
(United States) Christina McHale	7	7^{9}

==== Eighth qualifier ====
First round
8	(United States) Jennifer Brady	6	6
(China) Xu Shilin	0	3
(China) Gao Xinyu	3	1
11	(Ukraine) Kateryna Kozlova	6	6

Qualifying competition
8	(United States) Jennifer Brady	6	4	6
11	(Ukraine) Kateryna Kozlova	2	6	4
