= 2019 WTA Finals =

- Date: 27 October – 3 November
- Edition: 49th (singles) / 44th (doubles)
- Draw: 8S / 8D
- Prize money: $14,000,000
- Surface: Hard (indoor)
- Location: Shenzhen, China
- Venue: Shenzhen Bay Sports Centre

Champions

Singles
- (Australia) Ashleigh Barty

Doubles
- (Hungary) Tímea Babos / (France) Kristina Mladenovic
- WTA Finals

The 2019 WTA Finals, also known by its sponsored name Shiseido WTA Finals Shenzhen, was a women's tennis tournament held in Shenzhen, China. It was the 49th edition of the singles event and the 44th edition of the doubles competition. The tournament was contested by eight singles players and eight doubles teams. This was the first time Shenzhen held the WTA Finals.

== Champions ==
=== Singles ===
- (Australia) Ashleigh Barty def. (Ukraine) Elina Svitolina 6–4, 6–3

=== Doubles ===
- (Hungary) Tímea Babos / (France) Kristina Mladenovic def. (Chinese Taipei) Hsieh Su-wei / (Czech Republic) Barbora Strýcová, 6–1, 6–3

== Tournament ==
The 2019 WTA Finals took place at the Shenzhen Bay Sports Center the week of October 28, 2019, and is the 49th edition of the event. This was the first time Shenzhen hosted the event. The tournament is run by the Women's Tennis Association (WTA) as part of the 2019 WTA Tour. Shenzhen is the tenth city to host the WTA Finals since the tournament's inauguration in 1972.

=== Qualifying ===
In the singles, point totals are calculated by combining point totals from sixteen tournaments. Of these sixteen tournaments, a player's results from the four Grand Slam events, the four Premier Mandatory tournaments, and (for the top 20 players at the end of 2018) the best results from two Premier 5 tournaments must be included.
In the doubles, point totals are calculated by any combination of eleven tournaments throughout the year. Unlike in the singles, this combination does not need to include results from the Grand Slam or Premier-level tournaments.

=== Format ===
Both the singles and doubles events feature eight players/teams in a round robin event, split into two groups of four. Over the first four days of competition, each player/team meets the other three players/teams in her group, with the top two in each group advancing to the semifinals. The first-placed player/team in one group meets the second-placed player/team in the other group, and vice versa. The winners of each semifinal meet in the championship match. The doubles event returns to the round robin format for the first time since 2015.

==== Round robin tie-breaking methods ====
The final standings are made using these methods:

1. Greatest number of [match] wins.
2. Greatest number of matches played.
3. Head-to-head results if only two players are tied, or if three players are tied then:

a. If three players each have the same number of wins, a player having played fewer than all three matches is automatically eliminated and the player advancing to the single elimination competition is the winner of the match-up of the two remaining tied players.
b. Highest percentage of sets won.
c. Highest percentage of games won.

== Prize money and points ==
The total prize money for the BNP Paribas WTA Finals 2019 is US$14,000,000. The tables below are based on the updated draw sheet information.

Singles
| Stage | Prize money | Points |
|---|---|---|
| Champion | RR^{1} + $3,505,000 | SF + 750 |
| Runner-up | RR + $1,180,000 | SF + 330 |
| Semifinalist | RR + $80,000 | RR |
| Round robin win per match | +$305,000 | 250 |
| Round robin loss per match | —N/a | 125 |
| Participation Fee | 3 matches = $305,000; 2 matches = $265,000; 1 match = $220,000 | —N/a |
| Alternates | 2 matches = $210,000; 1 match = $165,000; 0 matches = $125,000 | —N/a |
^{1} RR means prize money or points won in the round robin round.

Doubles
| Stage | Prize money | Points |
|---|---|---|
| Champion | RR^{1} + $700,000 | SF + 750 |
| Runner-up | RR + $225,000 | SF + 330 |
| Semifinalist | RR + $15,000 | RR |
| Round robin win per match | +$50,000 | 250 |
| Round robin loss per match | —N/a | 125 |
| Participation Fee | 3 matches = $150,000; 2 matches = $130,000; 1 match = $110,000 | —N/a |
| Alternate | 2 matches = $90,000; 1 match = $70,000; 0 matches = $50,000 | —N/a |
^{1} RR means prize money or points won in the round robin round.

== Qualified players ==
=== Singles ===
| # | Players | Points | Tourn | Date Qualified |
|---|---|---|---|---|
| 1 | (Australia) Ashleigh Barty | 6,476 | 14 | 9 September |
| 2 | (Czech Republic) Karolína Plíšková | 5,315 | 18 | 15 September |
| 3 | (Japan) Naomi Osaka | 5,246 | 16 | 4 October |
| 4 | (Romania) Simona Halep | 4,962 | 16 | 2 October |
| 5 | (Canada) Bianca Andreescu | 4,942 | 12 | 2 October |
| 6 | (Czech Republic) Petra Kvitová | 4,401 | 16 | 7 October |
| 7 | (Switzerland) Belinda Bencic | 4,120 | 24 | 19 October |
| 8 | (Ukraine) Elina Svitolina | 3,995 | 21 | 14 October |

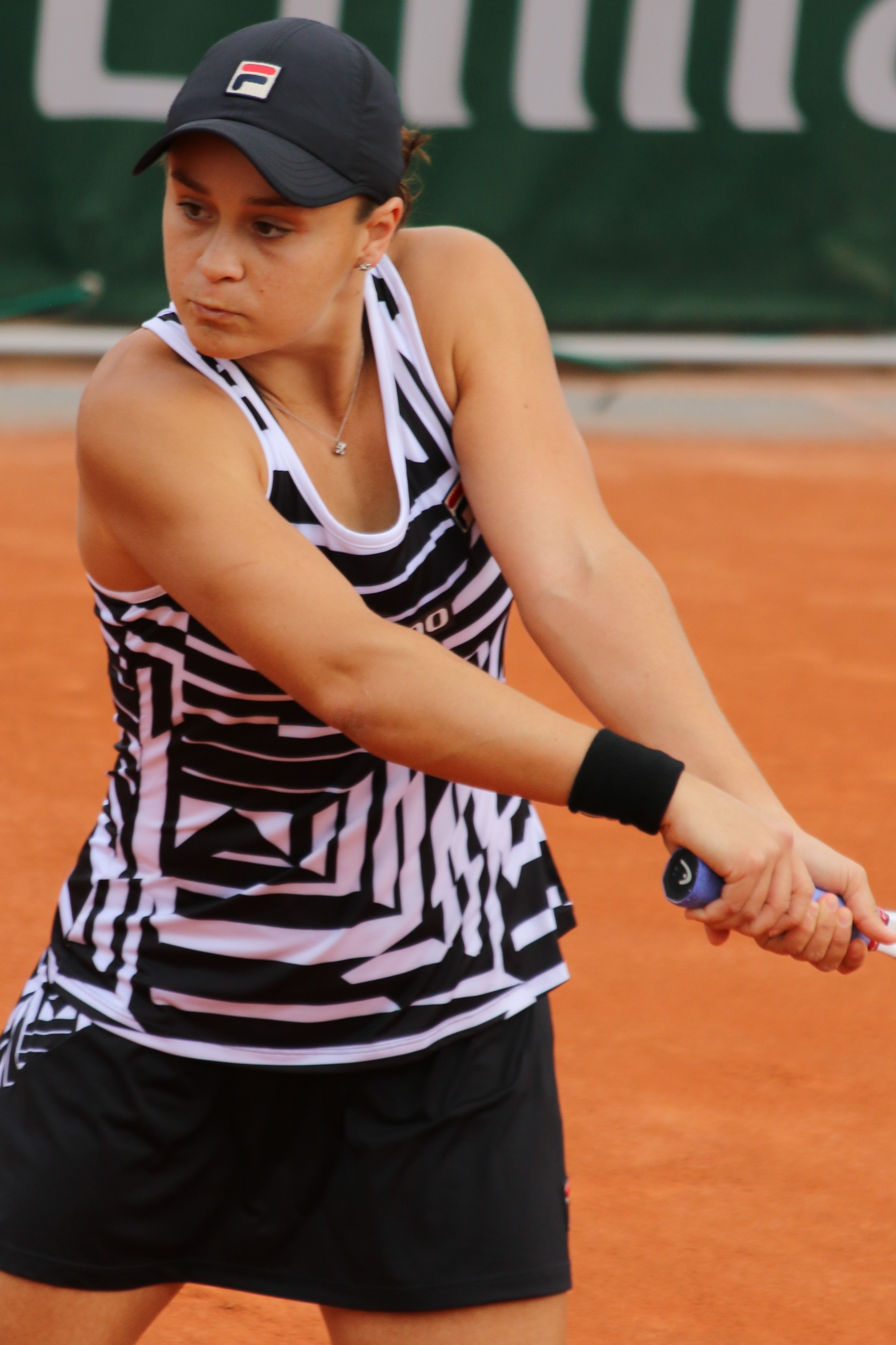
Ashleigh Barty won her maiden Grand Slam title at Roland Garros.

On 9 September, Ashleigh Barty became the first qualifier.

Ashleigh Barty began the year at the Hopman Cup where she teamed up with Matthew Ebden but ended up second in their group thus failing to reach the final. She then competed at the Sydney International, where she reached the final but lost to Petra Kvitová in a third-set tiebreak. She then reached the quarterfinals of a slam for the first time at the Australian Open but lost again to Kvitová in straight sets. She then represented Australia in Fed Cup where they faced the United States in the quarterfinals where they won with Barty winning both her matches. At the Sunshine Double, she reached the fourth round of the BNP Paribas Open but lost to Elina Svitolina in three sets. She, however, bounced back by winning her first Premier Mandatory event at the Miami Open defeating Karolína Plíšková in the final in two tight sets. She then continued her good form by giving Australia two wins in the semifinals of the Fed Cup against Belarus. At the clay season, she reached the quarterfinals of the Madrid Open but lost to Simona Halep in two tight sets. At the Italian Open, she suffered a shock loss to Kristina Mladenovic in the third round in two quick sets. Despite the average results during the clay season, Barty was able to capture her first slam title at the French Open, in a battle of maiden grand slam finalists, when she defeated Markéta Vondroušová in the final.

The grass-court season she began with her third title of the year at the Birmingham Classic defeating Julia Görges and in the process also claiming the world No. 1 ranking for the first time, to be the first Australian number 1 in more than 40 years. She came into the Wimbledon Championships as one of the favorites but was upset by Alison Riske in the fourth round. At the US Open Series, she lost her first match at the Rogers Cup to Sofia Kenin but bounced back by reaching the semifinals of the Western & Southern Open losing to Svetlana Kuznetsova. At the US Open, she suffered another fourth-round slam loss, this time to Wang Qiang. At the Asian swing, Barty delivered good results when she reached the semifinals of the Wuhan Open losing to defending and eventual champion Aryna Sabalenka and then reached the final of the China Open losing to Naomi Osaka.

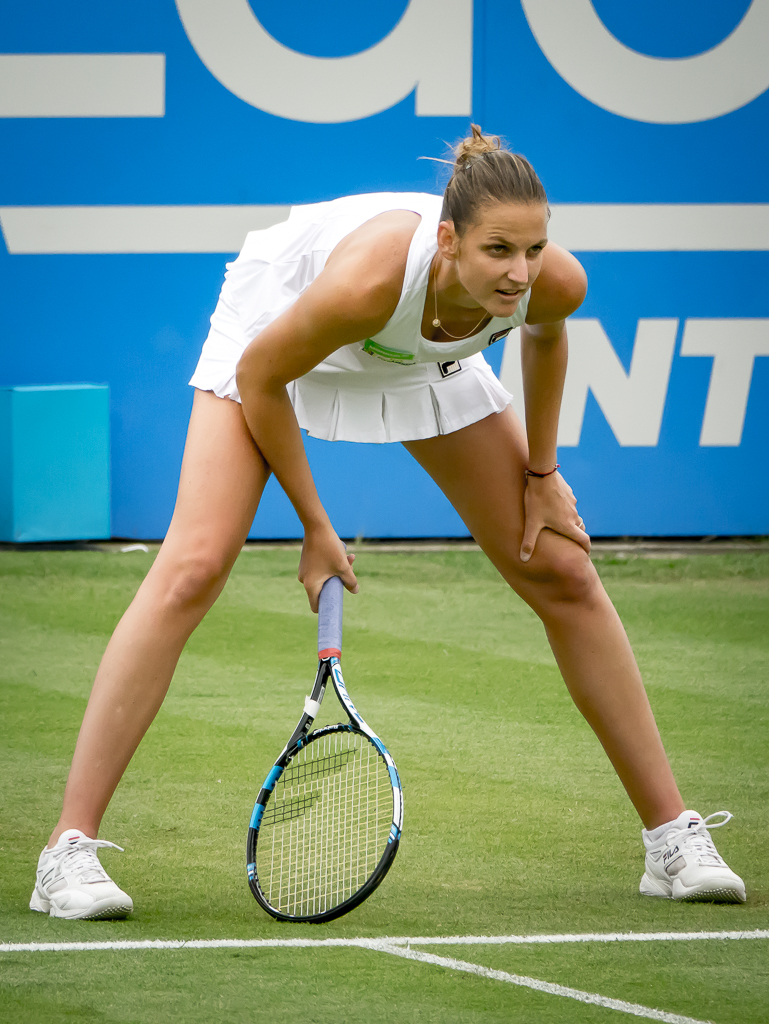
Karolína Plíšková claimed four titles in the year.

On 15 September, Karolína Plíšková took the second spot.

Karolína Plíšková began the year by winning the Brisbane International defeating Lesia Tsurenko in the final in three sets. At the Australian Open, she saved match points and came back from 1–5 down in the third set in the quarterfinals against Serena Williams but lost to Naomi Osaka in the semifinals in three sets. She represented the Czech Republic in the Fed Cup, where they lost 2–3 to Romania (she won her first match, but lost her second). She then reached the quarterfinals of the Dubai Tennis Championships but lost to Hsieh Su-wei despite leading 5–1 in the final set and the quarterfinals of the BNP Paribas Open and lost to Belinda Bencic. She reached her second final of the year at the Miami Open losing to Ashleigh Barty in two tight sets. She began her clay-court season at the Stuttgart Open, as the defending champion, but lost in her first match to Victoria Azarenka. She suffered a second-round upset to Kateryna Kozlova at the Madrid Open. She bounced back at the Italian Open when she won the title defeating Johanna Konta in the final. However, at the French Open she fell in the third round to Petra Martić.

She began her grass season at the Birmingham Classic but lost to sister Kristýna in the second round in a third-set tiebreak. She bounced back with a title at the Eastbourne International without dropping more than four games in a set the entire tournament. At the Wimbledon Championships, she was upset by compatriot Karolína Muchová in the fourth round despite serving for the match twice but finally lost a game away from a match tiebreak. At the US Open Series, she reached the quarterfinals of the Rogers Cup and the Western & Southern Open losing to Bianca Andreescu and Svetlana Kuznetsova, respectively. She had another poor slam run at the US Open, when she lost to Johanna Konta in the fourth round despite leading their head-to-head 6–1 before the match. She then claimed her fourth title of the year at the Zhengzhou Open defeating Martić in the final. However, the rest of her Asian swing was poor, losing back-to-back in the third round of the Wuhan Open to Yastremska and at the China Open to Jeļena Ostapenko in the first round.

On 2 October, Simona Halep and Bianca Andreescu qualified for the event.

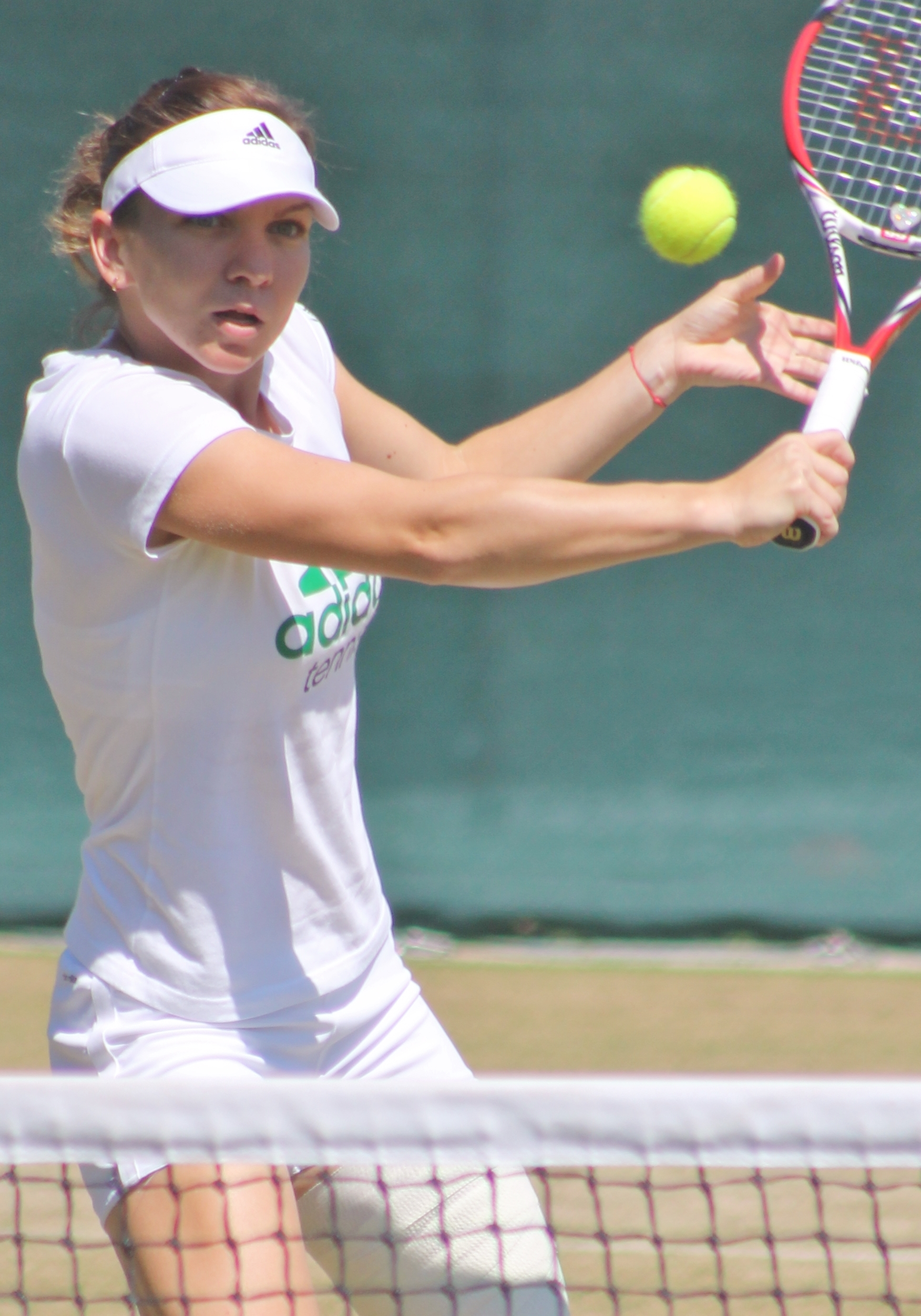
Simona Halep won the Wimbledon Championships.

Simona Halep began the year without a full-term coach, losing her opening match of the year at the Sydney International with a loss to Ashleigh Barty. She then reached the fourth round of the Australian Open, losing to Serena Williams in a three-set thriller. Steering Romania towards a shock 3–2 win over powerhouses Czech Republic in Fed Cup, Halep followed up that result by reaching her first final of the year at the Qatar Total Open (where she lost to Elise Mertens), beating Elina Svitolina along the way after coming from 1–4 down in the final set. She then played at the Dubai Tennis Championships, losing in the quarterfinals to Belinda Bencic in three sets. At the BNP Paribas Open, she lost to Markéta Vondroušová in the fourth round. A semifinal appearance at the Miami Open (losing to Karolína Plíšková) soon followed, allowing her to rise to No. 2 in the rankings. In the Fed Cup semifinals, even though she won both of her singles matches, Romania lost to France 2–3.

Her clay-court season started at the Madrid Open, where she reached the final before losing to Kiki Bertens in straight sets. At the Italian Open, she fell to Vondroušová in her opening match. Tipped as the huge favourite at Roland Garros, Halep fell to a shock defeat against talented youngster Amanda Anisimova in the quarterfinals thus ending her title defence. Surprisingly, Halep enjoyed a far more successful grass court season, losing to Angelique Kerber in the quarterfinals of the Eastbourne International before picking up her first title of the year by lifting her second Major title at Wimbledon, beating Serena Williams 6–2, 6–2 in the final. An achilles injury forced Halep to retire in the Rogers Cup quarterfinals against Marie Bouzková, and a tough stretch of results followed as she lost to Madison Keys in the third round of the Western & Southern Open and was shocked by Taylor Townsend in the second round of the US Open. Similar to previous years, she struggled during the Asian swing and was plagued by a back injury which was causing her discomfort. She had to retire in the third round of the Wuhan Open facing Elena Rybakina and lost to Ekaterina Alexandrova in the China Open second round.

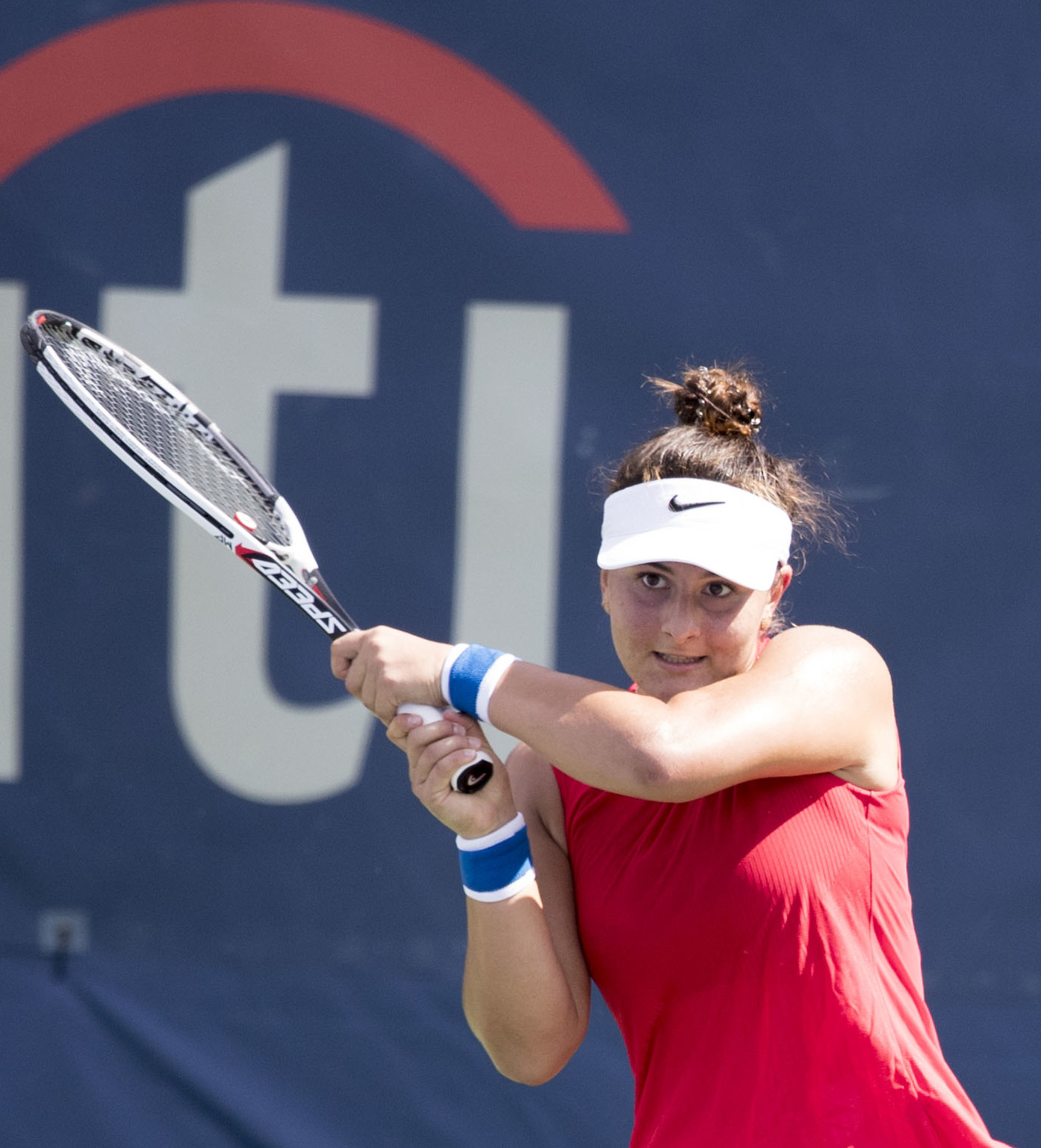
Bianca Andreescu won the US Open

Bianca Andreescu began her year at the Auckland Open where she reached her first WTA final as a qualifier but lost to Julia Görges in three sets. She then qualified for the Australian Open before losing to Anastasija Sevastova in the second round. She won her first WTA 125K title at Newport Beach defeating Jessica Pegula. She represented Canada in the Fed Cup, where they defeated the Netherlands 4–0 after two Andreescu wins. She then reached the semifinal of the Mexican Open, losing to Sofia Kenin.

Andreescu had a breakout tournament at the BNP Paribas Open Premier Mandatory event, when she won in three tight sets over Angelique Kerber for her first WTA tour title. At the Miami Open, she retired in the fourth round against Anett Kontaveit. She then missed the clay season preparation due to a right shoulder injury. At the French Open, she withdrew before the second-round match against Sofia Kenin. Subsequently, she missed the grass-court season to spend more time healing her shoulder injury. Andreescu returned to play in her home tournament, the Rogers Cup in Toronto, where she claimed the title after Serena Williams experienced back spasms and was forced to retire down 1–3 in the first set. At the US Open, she faced Serena again in the final and came through in two tight sets. At the China Open her 17-match winning streak was broken by Osaka, losing to the Japanese in the quarterfinals in three sets.

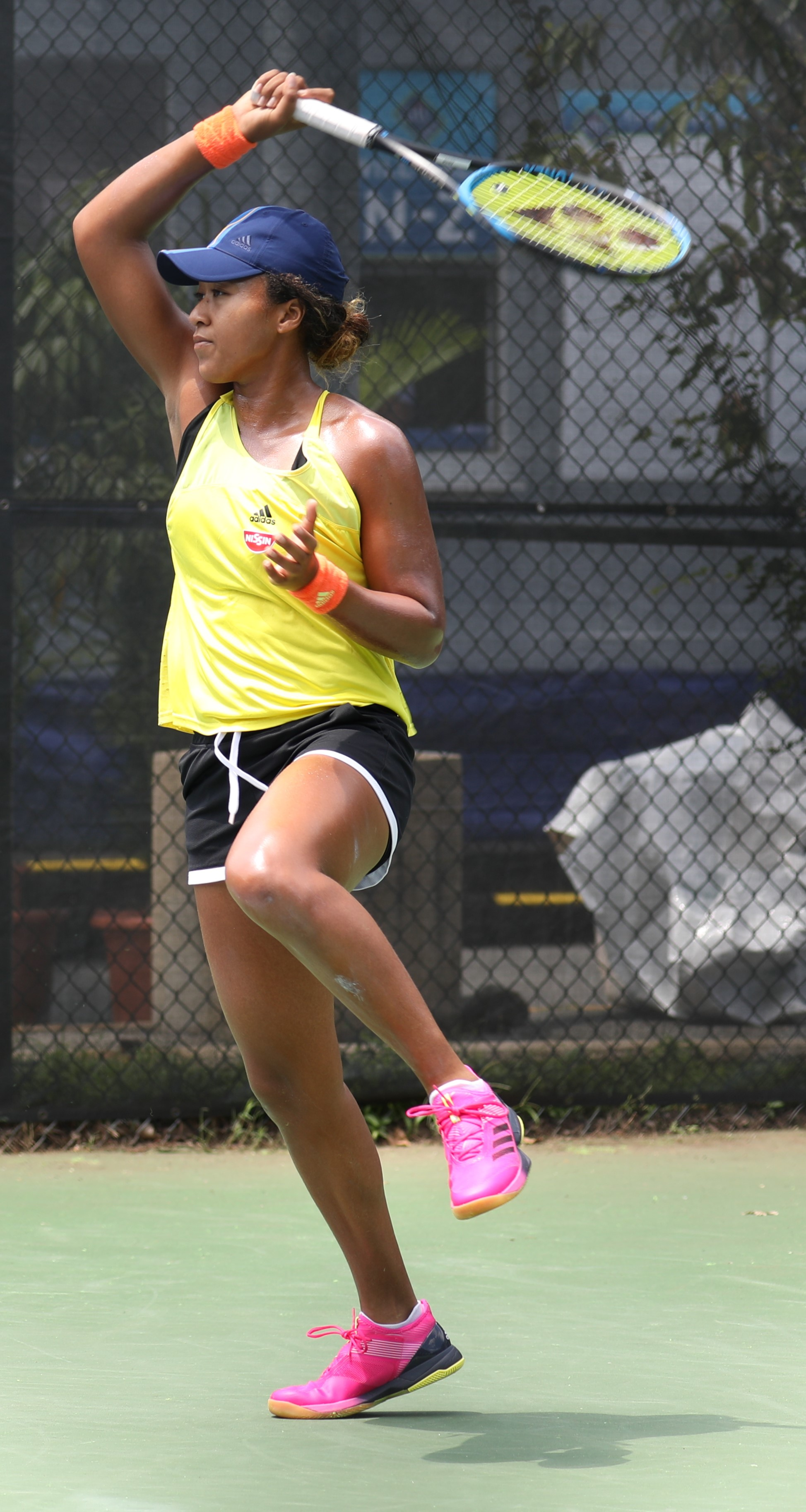
Naomi Osaka won the Australian Open

On 4 October, Naomi Osaka booked her spot to the WTA Finals.

Naomi Osaka began her 2019 season reaching the semifinals at Brisbane, where she lost to Lesia Tsurenko. However, she was able to showcase her best at the Australian Open, where she lifted her second consecutive Grand Slam title after beating Petra Kvitová in a thrilling three-set contest, thus ascending for the first time in her career to the world No. 1. Shortly after, she parted ways with her coach, Sascha Bajin. Osaka then went to the Dubai Tennis Championships, where she lost in the second round to Kristina Mladenovic. She returned to the competition at the BNP Paribas Open, where she entered the tournament as the first seed and defending champion, but ended up losing to Belinda Bencic in the fourth round. Moreover, she went on to lose in the third round at the Miami Open to Hsieh Su-wei in three hard-fought sets.

Osaka began the clay-court season at Stuttgart, where she reached the semifinals before withdrawing from her match against Anett Kontaveit due to an abdominal injury. She then took part in the Madrid Open and Italian Open, where she reached the quarterfinals in both (losing to Bencic and withdrawing against Bertens respectively). Osaka went on to finish the clay-court swing with a shocking third-round loss to Kateřina Siniaková at the French Open, which ended her 16-win streak at Grand Slam tournaments.

Osaka entered the Birmingham Classic as the first seed but she lost in the second round to Yulia Putintseva in straight sets. Furthermore, Osaka went on to lose once again to Putintseva at Wimbledon in the first round. Osaka resumed competition at the Rogers Cup and Western & Southern Open, reaching the quarterfinals, where she lost to Serena Williams and Kenin (by retirement), respectively. Finally, she capped off the US Open Series at the US Open, where she entered as the defending champion but was defeated in the fourth round by Bencic. She then claimed the titles at the Toray Pan Pacific Open and China Open defeating Anastasia Pavlyuchenkova and Barty in the finals.

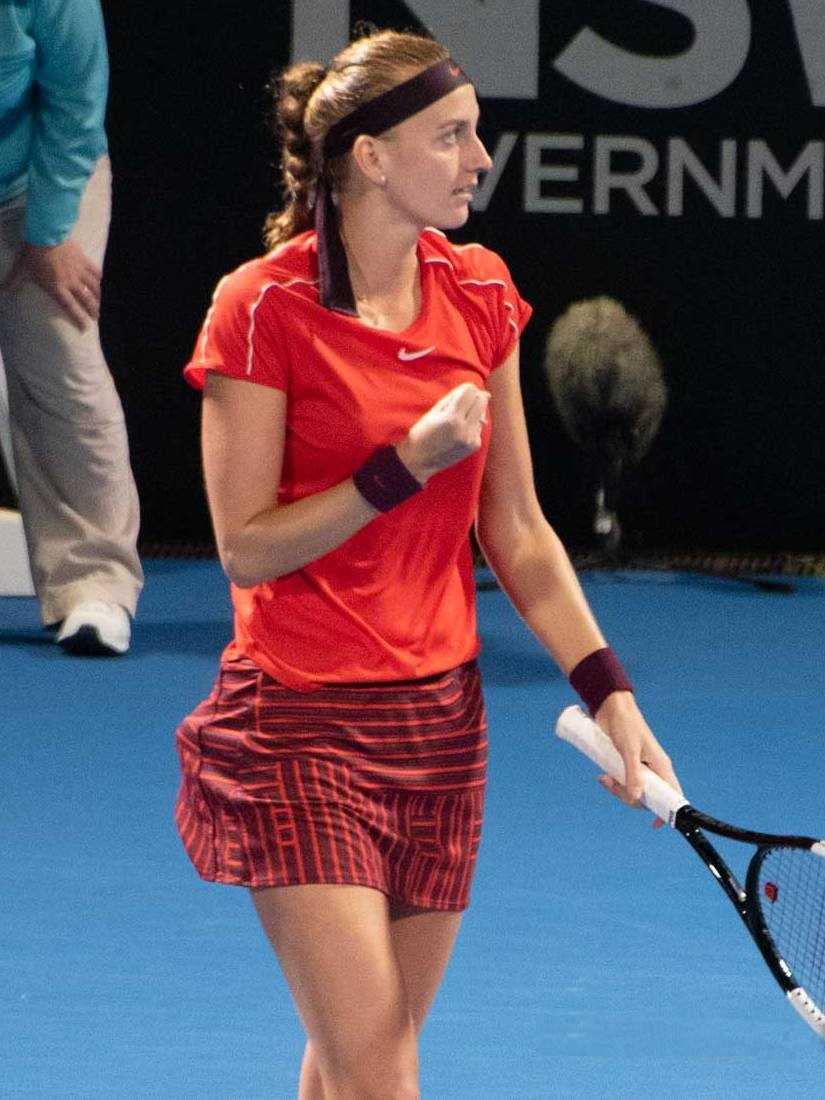
Petra Kvitová reached the final of the Australian Open.

On 7 October, Petra Kvitová was announced to be the sixth qualifier.

Petra Kvitová began the year at the Brisbane International, where she lost in the second round to Kontaveit. She then bounced back after claiming the title at the Sydney International defeating Barty in the final. At the Australian Open, she reached her first slam final since Wimbledon 2014 but lost to Osaka, losing her first slam final. The following week, she competed at the St. Petersburg Ladies Trophy and lost in the quarterfinals to Donna Vekić. She reached her third final of the year at the Dubai Tennis Championships but lost to Bencic in three sets. Her Sunshine Double was not successful, losing in the second round to Venus Williams in the second round of the Indian Wells Masters and the quarterfinals of the Miami Open to Barty. She began her clay season at the Stuttgart Open and claimed the title when she defeated Estonia's Kontaveit.

She was the defending champion at the Madrid Open and made the last eight where she lost to eventual champion Bertens, in a rematch of last year's final, in straight sets. At the Italian Open, her first appearance there since 2016, Kvitová made the third round where she faced Sakkari but retired with an injured calf while trailing in the decider. She then pulled out of the French Open with an arm injury, bringing her clay court swing to a premature close. Returning to competition at Wimbledon after a six-week layoff, sixth-seeded Kvitová cruised to the fourth round, her first appearance in the second week there since winning the title in 2014, but lost to 19th seed Johanna Konta in three sets. She was forced to withdraw from the Rogers Cup to recover from the arm injury. She returned to action at the Western & Southern Open where she fell in her opener to Sakkari in three sets. This was followed by a loss to Andrea Petkovic in the second round of the US Open, making it her first-ever loss at this stage of the tournament in 12 overall appearances. However, she bounced back with strong results during the Asian swing. At the Wuhan Open, she sailed to the last four but was then stopped by Alison Riske. The following week at the China Open she reached the quarterfinal, where she succumbed to world No. 1 Barty in three sets.

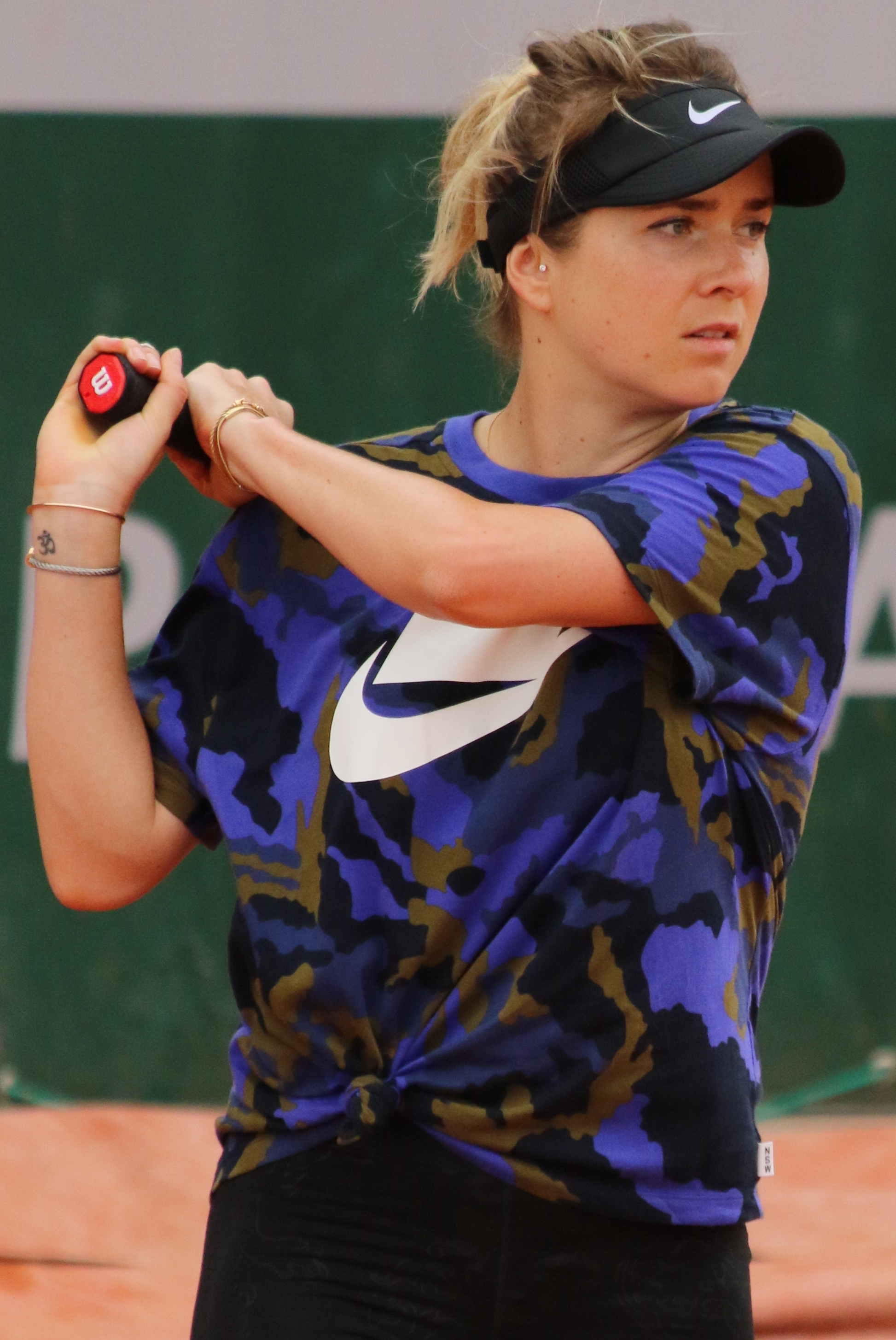
Elina Svitolina qualified for the third straight year.

On 14 October, defending champion Elina Svitolina was announced to be the seventh qualifier.

Elina Svitolina opened the season with an unsuccessful title defense at the Brisbane International, where she lost her first match to the previous year's finalist, Aliaksandra Sasnovich. She rebounded by reaching the quarterfinals of the Australian Open, where she was defeated by eventual champion Naomi Osaka in straight sets. Svitolina then reached three semifinals in a row at the Qatar Total Open losing to Halep, the Dubai Tennis Championships losing to Bencic and the BNP Paribas Open losing to Andreescu. At the Miami Open, she suffered a surprise defeat in her opening match against Wang Yafan. Svitolina's clay-court season began with back-to-back opening round losses to Pauline Parmentier at the Madrid Open and to Victoria Azarenka at the Italian Open, where she was the two-time defending champion and had held a match point leading 5–2 in the final set. At the French Open, Svitolina was defeated in the third round by the 2016 champion, Garbiñe Muguruza. After losing in her opening rounds at the Birmingham Classic (to Margarita Gasparyan) and Eastbourne International (to Alizé Cornet), Svitolina proceeded to reach her first Grand Slam semifinal at Wimbledon, where she faced eventual champion Simona Halep and was defeated in straight sets.

Svitolina's North American hard-court season began at the Silicon Valley Classic, where as the top seed, she fell to Maria Sakkari in the quarterfinals. She would then fall to Sofia Kenin in both the quarterfinals of the Rogers Cup and the Round of 16 at the Western & Southern Open. At the US Open, she reached her second successive Grand Slam semifinal, where she was defeated in straight sets by Serena Williams. In the Asian swing, Svitolina reached the quarterfinal in the Zhengzhou Open, losing to Kristina Mladenovic, the second round in the Guangzhou Open, retiring to Marie Bouzková, the quarterfinal in the Wuhan Open losing to eventual runner-up Alison Riske, and lost to Kiki Bertens in the China Open quarterfinals. Finally, she lost to Veronika Kudermetova in the second round of the Kremlin Cup.

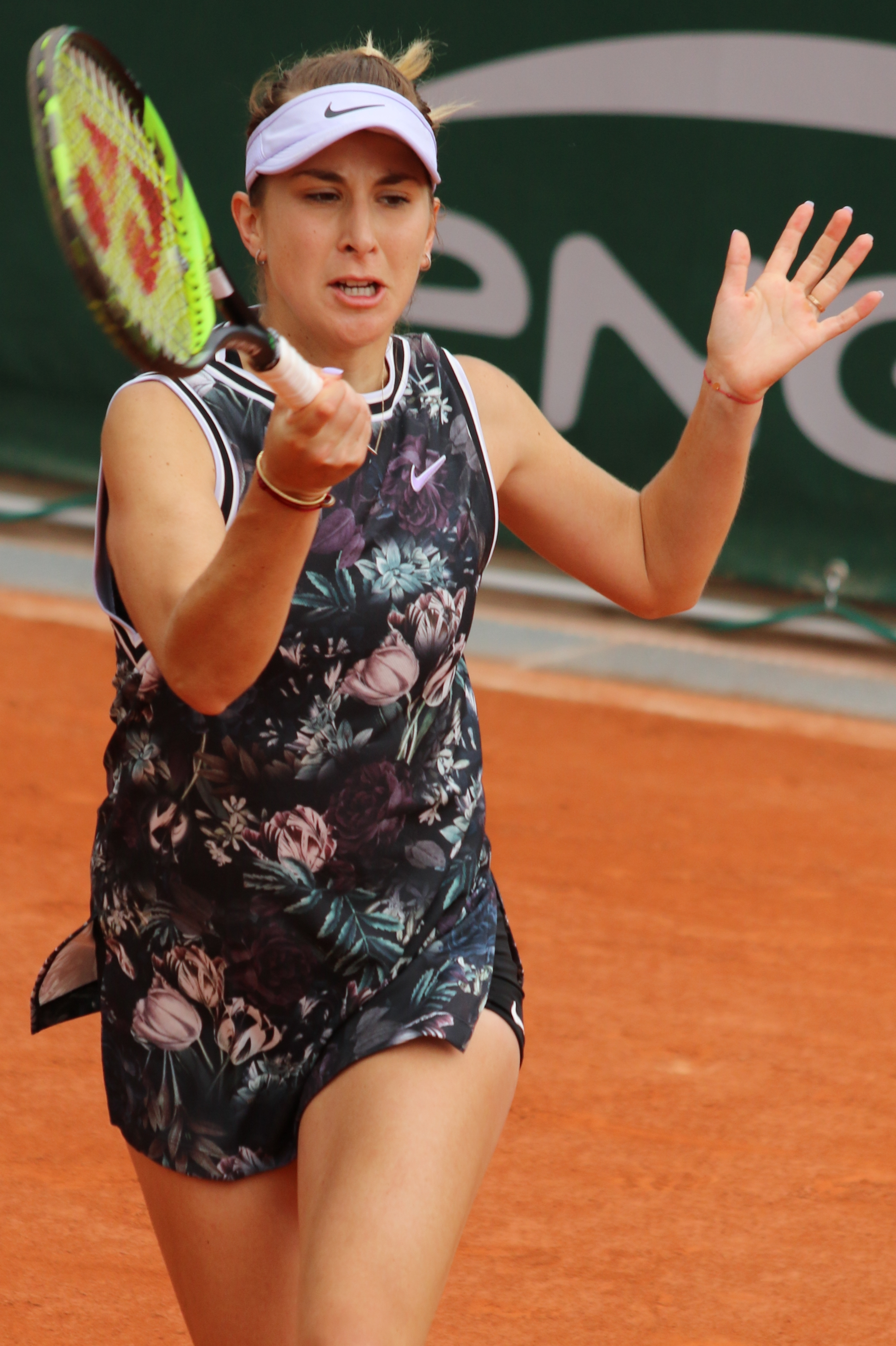
Belinda Bencic qualified for the first time at the WTA Finals.

On 19 October, Belinda Bencic was announced as the final qualifier after reaching the final in Moscow.

Belinda Bencic began her year at the Hopman Cup, where she represented Switzerland with Roger Federer, and they won the title defeating Germany in the final. She reached the semifinals at the Hobart International to Anna Karolína Schmiedlová and made it to the third round at the Australian Open, losing to eventual finalist Petra Kvitová. At the St. Petersburg Ladies Trophy, she lost to Veronika Kudermetova in the second qualifying round. In the Fed Cup she won both of her matches, helping Switzerland to a 3–1 win over Italy. She had a breakthrough at the Dubai Tennis Championships defeating Kvitová in three sets in the final. Bencic continued her win streak with a semifinal appearance at the BNP Paribas Open losing to Angelique Kerber. However, at the Miami Open, she lost in the opening round to Yulia Putintseva.

At the Charleston Open, she reached the quarterfinals but fell to Petra Martić. At the Ladies Open Lugano, she was upset by Antonia Lottner in the first round. She then played at the Stuttgart Open but fell in three sets to Kiki Bertens in the second round. At the Mutua Madrid Open, she reached the semifinals losing to Halep and at the Italian Open, she was upset by Kristina Mladenovic in the second round. At the French Open, she advanced to the third round for the first time, where she was defeated by No. 24 Donna Vekić. During the grass court season, Bencic made her second WTA final of the year at the Mallorca Open, but finished runner-up to Sofia Kenin despite having three match points in the second set. She then competed at the Eastbourne International losing to Ekaterina Alexandrova in the second round. At the Wimbledon Championships, she made the third round losing to Alison Riske in three sets. After Wimbledon, she played at the Rogers Cup, where she fell to Elina Svitolina in straight sets in the round of 16. At the Western & Southern Open, she drew Victoria Azarenka in the first round, retiring being a set and a game down. At the US Open, she reached her first slam semifinal but lost to the eventual champion Bianca Andreescu in straight sets. However, in her next three events, she fell to Kudermetova in her opening match at the Wuhan Open, lost to Kvitová in the third round of the China Open and was upset by Anna-Lena Friedsam in the first round of the Linz Open. Bencic won the Kremlin Cup by defeating Anastasia Pavlyuchenkova in three sets.

== Groupings ==
=== Singles ===
The 2019 edition of the year–end finals will feature four world No. 1s, five major champions and one major finalist. The competitors were divided into two groups.

Red group:
Ashleigh Barty, Naomi Osaka, Petra Kvitová & Belinda Bencic
Purple group:
Karolína Plíšková, Simona Halep, Bianca Andreescu & Elina Svitolina

== Day-by-day summaries ==
=== Day 1 (27 October) ===
Matches
| Event | Group | Winner | Loser | Score |
Day Session
| Singles round robin | Red Group | (Japan) Naomi Osaka [3] | (Czech Republic) Petra Kvitová [6] | 7–6^{(7–1)}, 4–6, 6–4 |
| Singles round robin | Red Group | (Australia) Ashleigh Barty [1] | (Switzerland) Belinda Bencic [7] | 5–7, 6–1, 6–2 |
Evening Session
| Doubles round robin | Purple Group | (Czech Republic) Barbora Strýcová (Chinese Taipei) Hsieh Su-wei [2] | (Australia) Samantha Stosur (China) Zhang Shuai [7] | 6–4, 4–6, [10–5] |
| Doubles round robin | Purple Group | (Czech Republic) Barbora Krejčíková (Czech Republic) Kateřina Siniaková [6] | (Canada) Gabriela Dabrowski (China) Xu Yifan [4] | 6–4, 6–2 |

=== Day 2 (28 October) ===
Matches
| Event | Group | Winner | Loser | Score |
Day Session
| Doubles round robin | Red Group | (Hungary) Tímea Babos (France) Kristina Mladenovic [3] | (Chinese Taipei) Chan Hao-ching (Chinese Taipei) Latisha Chan [5] | 6–2, 5–7, [10–6] |
| Singles round robin | Purple Group | (Ukraine) Elina Svitolina [8] | (Czech Republic) Karolína Plíšková [2] | 7–6^{(14–12)}, 6–4 |
Evening Session
| Singles round robin | Purple Group | (Romania) Simona Halep [5] | (Canada) Bianca Andreescu [4] | 3–6, 7–6^{(8–6)}, 6–3 |
| Doubles round robin | Red Group | (Germany) Anna-Lena Grönefeld (Netherlands) Demi Schuurs [8] | (Belgium) Elise Mertens (Belarus) Aryna Sabalenka [1] | 7–5, 1–6, [10–7] |

=== Day 3 (29 October) ===
Matches
| Event | Group | Winner | Loser | Score |
Day Session
| Doubles round robin | Purple Group | (Australia) Samantha Stosur (China) Zhang Shuai [7] | (Canada) Gabriela Dabrowski (China) Xu Yifan [4] | 4–6, 6–4, [10–5] |
| Singles round robin | Red Group | (Netherlands) Kiki Bertens [9] | (Australia) Ashleigh Barty [1] | 3–6, 6–3, 6–4 |
Evening Session
| Singles round robin | Red Group | (Switzerland) Belinda Bencic [7] | (Czech Republic) Petra Kvitová [6] | 6–3, 1–6, 6–4 |
| Doubles round robin | Purple Group | (Czech Republic) Barbora Strýcová (Chinese Taipei) Hsieh Su-wei [2] | (Czech Republic) Barbora Krejčíková (Czech Republic) Kateřina Siniaková [6] | 6–2, 1–6, [10–5] |

=== Day 4 (30 October) ===
Matches
| Event | Group | Winner | Loser | Score |
Day Session
| Doubles round robin | Red Group | (Belgium) Elise Mertens (Belarus) Aryna Sabalenka [1] | (Chinese Taipei) Chan Hao-ching (Chinese Taipei) Latisha Chan [5] | 7–6^{(7–5)}, 6–4 |
| Singles round robin | Purple Group | (Ukraine) Elina Svitolina [8] | (Romania) Simona Halep [5] | 7–5, 6–3 |
Evening Session
| Singles round robin | Purple Group | (Czech Republic) Karolína Plíšková [2] | (Canada) Bianca Andreescu [4] | 6–3, ret. |
| Doubles round robin | Red Group | (Hungary) Tímea Babos (France) Kristina Mladenovic [3] | (Germany) Anna-Lena Grönefeld (Netherlands) Demi Schuurs [8] | 7–5, 6–2 |

=== Day 5 (31 October) ===
Matches
| Event | Group | Winner | Loser | Score |
Day Session
| Doubles round robin | Purple Group | (Australia) Samantha Stosur (China) Zhang Shuai [7] | (Czech Republic) Barbora Krejčíková (Czech Republic) Kateřina Siniaková [6] | 6–3, 7–6^{(9–7)} |
| Singles round robin | Red Group | (Australia) Ashleigh Barty [1] | (Czech Republic) Petra Kvitová [6] | 6–4, 6–2 |
Evening Session
| Singles round robin | Red Group | (Switzerland) Belinda Bencic [7] | (Netherlands) Kiki Bertens [9] | 7–5, 1–0 ret. |
| Doubles round robin | Purple Group | (Canada) Gabriela Dabrowski (China) Xu Yifan [4] | (Czech Republic) Barbora Strýcová (Chinese Taipei) Hsieh Su-wei [2] | 2–6, 6–4, [11–9] |

=== Day 6 (1 November) ===
Matches
| Event | Group | Winner | Loser | Score |
Day Session
| Doubles round robin | Red Group | (Hungary) Tímea Babos (France) Kristina Mladenovic [3] | (Belgium) Elise Mertens (Belarus) Aryna Sabalenka [1] | 4–6, 6–2, [10–5] |
| Singles round robin | Purple Group | (Ukraine) Elina Svitolina [8] | (United States) Sofia Kenin [10] | 7–5, 7–6^{(12–10)} |
Evening Session
| Singles round robin | Purple Group | (Czech Republic) Karolína Plíšková [2] | (Romania) Simona Halep [5] | 6–0, 2–6, 6–4 |
| Doubles round robin | Red Group | (Germany) Anna-Lena Grönefeld (Netherlands) Demi Schuurs [8] | (Chinese Taipei) Chan Hao-ching (Chinese Taipei) Latisha Chan [5] | 6–2, 6–4 |

=== Day 7 (2 November) ===
Matches
| Event | Winner | Loser | Score |
Day Session
| Doubles Semifinals | (Hungary) Tímea Babos (France) Kristina Mladenovic [3] | (Australia) Samantha Stosur (China) Zhang Shuai [7] | 1–6, 6–4, [10–6] |
| Singles Semifinals | (Ukraine) Elina Svitolina [8] | (Switzerland) Belinda Bencic [7] | 5–7, 6–3, 4–1 ret. |
Evening Session
| Singles Semifinals | (Australia) Ashleigh Barty [1] | (Czech Republic) Karolína Plíšková [2] | 4–6, 6–2, 6–3 |
| Doubles Semifinals | (Czech Republic) Barbora Strýcová (Chinese Taipei) Hsieh Su-wei [2] | (Germany) Anna-Lena Grönefeld (Netherlands) Demi Schuurs [8] | 6–1, 6–2 |

=== Day 8 (3 November) ===
Matches
| Event | Winner | Loser | Score |
|---|---|---|---|
| Doubles Final | (Hungary) Tímea Babos (France) Kristina Mladenovic [3] | (Czech Republic) Barbora Strýcová (Chinese Taipei) Hsieh Su-wei [2] | 6–1, 6–3 |
| Singles Final | (Australia) Ashleigh Barty [1] | (Ukraine) Elina Svitolina [8] | 6–4, 6–3 |

== Porsche Race to Shenzhen ==
- Charts sourced from WTA

=== Singles ===
- Players in gold qualified for the WTA Finals.
- Players in brown withdrew from consideration of competing as alternates.

| Rank | Athlete | Grand Slam tournament | | | | Premier Mandatory | | | | Best two Premier 5 | | Best other | | | | | | Total points | Tourn | WTA Titles |
|---|---|---|---|---|---|---|---|---|---|---|---|---|---|---|---|---|---|---|---|---|
| Rank | Athlete | AUS | FRA | WIM | USO | INW | MIA | MAD | CHI | 1 | 2 | 1 | 2 | 3 | 4 | 5 | 6 | Total points | Tourn | WTA Titles |
| 1 | (Australia) Ashleigh Barty | QF; 430 | W 2000 | R16; 240 | R16; 240 | R16; 120 | W 1000 | QF; 215 | F 650 | SF; 350 | SF; 350 | W 470 | F 305 | R16; 105 | R32; 1 | | | 6,476 | 14 | 3 |
| 2 | (Czech Republic) Karolína Plíšková | SF; 780 | R32; 130 | R16; 240 | R16; 240 | QF; 215 | F 650 | R32; 65 | R64; 10 | W 900 | QF; 190 | W 470 | W 470 | W 470 | QF; 190 | QF; 190 | R16; 105 | 5,315 | 18 | 4 |
| 3 | (Japan) Naomi Osaka | W 2000 | R32; 130 | R128; 10 | R16; 240 | R16; 120 | R32; 65 | QF; 215 | W 1000 | QF; 190 | QF; 190 | W 470 | QF; 190 | SF; 185 | SF; 185 | R16; 55 | R32; 1 | 5,246 | 16 | 3 |
| 4 | (Romania) Simona Halep | R16; 240 | QF; 430 | W 2000 | R64; 70 | R16; 120 | SF; 390 | F 650 | R32; 65 | QF; 190 | QF; 190 | F 305 | R16; 105 | R16; 105 | QF; 100 | R32; 1 | R16; 1 | 4,962 | 16 | 1 |
| 5 | (Canada) Bianca Andreescu | R64; 110 | R64; 70 | A 0 | W 2000 | W 1000 | R16; 120 | A 0 | QF; 215 | W 900 | | F 198 | W 160 | SF; 110 | W 50 | QF; 9 | | 4,942 | 12 | 3 |
| 6 | (Czech Republic) Petra Kvitová | F 1300 | A 0 | R16; 240 | R64; 70 | R64; 10 | QF; 215 | QF; 215 | QF; 215 | F 585 | SF; 350 | W 470 | W 470 | R16; 105 | QF; 100 | R16; 55 | R32; 1 | 4,401 | 16 | 2 |
| 7 | (Switzerland) Belinda Bencic | R32; 130 | R32; 130 | R32; 130 | SF; 780 | SF; 390 | R64; 10 | SF; 390 | R16; 120 | W 900 | R16; 105 | W 470 | F 180 | W 115 | SF; 110 | QF; 100 | R32; 60 | 4,120 | 24 | 2 |
| 8 | (Ukraine) Elina Svitolina | QF; 430 | R32; 130 | SF; 780 | SF; 780 | SF; 390 | R64; 10 | R64; 10 | QF; 215 | SF; 350 | QF; 190 | QF; 190 | SF; 185 | R16; 105 | QF; 100 | QF; 100 | R16; 30 | 3,995 | 21 | 0 |
Alternates / WTA Elite Trophy
| 9 | (United States) Serena Williams | QF; 430 | R32; 130 | F 1300 | F 1300 | R32; 65 | R32; 65 | A 0 | A 0 | F 585 | R32; 60 | | | | | | | 3,935 | 8 | 0 |
| 10 | (Netherlands) Kiki Bertens | R64; 70 | R64; 70 | R32; 130 | R32; 130 | R16; 120 | R16; 120 | W 1000 | SF; 390 | SF; 350 | R16; 105 | W 470 | SF; 185 | SF; 185 | SF; 185 | F 180 | F 180 | 3,870 | 25 | 2 |
| 11 | (United Kingdom) Johanna Konta | R64; 70 | SF; 780 | QF; 430 | QF; 430 | R32; 65 | R64; 35 | R32; 65 | A 0 | F 585 | R64; 1 | F 180 | QF; 60 | R16; 55 | R16; 55 | R16; 55 | Q2; 13 | 2,879 | 16 | 0 |
| 12 | (United States) Sofia Kenin | R64; 70 | R16; 240 | R64; 70 | R32; 130 | R64; 35 | R64; 10 | R64; 10 | R16; 120 | SF; 350 | SF; 350 | W 280 | W 280 | W 280 | F 180 | R16; 105 | R16; 105 | 2,615 | 23 | 3 |

=== Doubles ===
- Teams in gold qualified for the WTA Finals.
- Team in brown withdrew from consideration of competing as alternates.

| Rank | Team | Points | | | | | | | | | | | Total Points | Tourn | Titles |
| Rank | Team | 1 | 2 | 3 | 4 | 5 | 6 | 7 | 8 | 9 | 10 | 11 | Total Points | Tourn | Titles |
|---|---|---|---|---|---|---|---|---|---|---|---|---|---|---|---|
| 1 | (Belgium) Elise Mertens (Belarus) Aryna Sabalenka | W 2000 | W 1000 | W 1000 | SF; 780 | F 585 | QF; 430 | R16; 240 | R16; 10 | R32; 10 | R16; 1 | R16; 1 | 6,057 | 11 | 3 |
| 2 | (Chinese Taipei) Hsieh Su-wei (Czech Republic) Barbora Strýcová | W 2000 | W 1000 | W 900 | W 470 | R16; 240 | R16; 240 | QF; 215 | QF; 190 | R16; 120 | R16; 105 | R16; 10 | 5,490 | 13 | 4 |
| 3 | (Hungary) Tímea Babos (France) Kristina Mladenovic | W 2000 | F 1300 | SF; 780 | QF; 430 | W 280 | QF; 215 | SF; 185 | R32; 10 | R32; 10 | R16; 1 | | 5,211 | 10 | 2 |
| 4 | (Canada) Gabriela Dabrowski (China) Xu Yifan | F 1300 | F 650 | QF; 430 | QF; 430 | SF; 390 | SF; 350 | W 280 | QF; 215 | QF; 215 | QF; 190 | SF; 185 | 4,635 | 21 | 1 |
| 5 | (Chinese Taipei) Chan Hao-ching (Chinese Taipei) Latisha Chan | W 470 | W 470 | W 470 | QF; 430 | SF; 390 | SF; 390 | SF; 350 | SF; 350 | F 305 | W 280 | R16; 240 | 4,145 | 20 | 4 |
| 6 | (Czech Republic) Barbora Krejčíková (Czech Republic) Kateřina Siniaková | W 900 | SF; 780 | F 650 | QF; 430 | SF; 350 | W 280 | QF; 215 | QF; 190 | SF; 185 | R64; 10 | R32; 10 | 4,000 | 11 | 2 |
| 7 | (Australia) Samantha Stosur (China) Zhang Shuai | W 2000 | F 650 | QF; 430 | QF; 215 | QF; 190 | R32; 130 | R16; 120 | R16; 105 | QF; 60 | R64; 10 | R32; 10 | 3,920 | 13 | 1 |
| 8 | (Germany) Anna-Lena Grönefeld (Netherlands) Demi Schuurs | F 585 | F 585 | F 585 | QF; 430 | SF; 350 | F 305 | F 305 | QF; 215 | QF; 215 | QF; 190 | R32; 130 | 3,895 | 15 | 0 |
Alternates
| 9 | (Belarus) Victoria Azarenka (Australia) Ashleigh Barty | F 1300 | W 900 | SF; 390 | SF; 350 | R16; 240 | R16; 130 | R16; 120 | R32; 10 | | | | 3,440 | 8 | 1 |
| 10 | (United States) Nicole Melichar (Czech Republic) Květa Peschke | W 470 | W 470 | W 470 | QF; 430 | QF; 430 | R16; 240 | QF; 215 | QF; 190 | QF; 190 | F 180 | R32; 130 | 3,415 | 25 | 3 |

== Player head-to-head ==
=== Singles ===
Below are the head-to-head records as they approached the tournament. 2019 WTA Finals – Singles

| | | Barty | Plíšková | Osaka | Halep | Andreescu | Kvitová | Bencic | Svitolina | Overall | YTD |
| 1 | (Australia) Ashleigh Barty | | 3–2 | 2–2 | 1–3 | 0–0 | 2–4 | 0–0 | 0–5 | 8–16 | 53–11 |
| 2 | (Czech Republic) Karolína Plíšková | 2–3 | | 2–2 | 3–7 | 0–1 | 1–3 | 0–1 | 5–3 | 13–20 | 50–15 |
| 3 | (Japan) Naomi Osaka | 2–2 | 2–2 | | 1–4 | 1–0 | 1–0 | 1–3 | 3–3 | 11–14 | 40–11 |
| 4 | (Romania) Simona Halep | 3–1 | 7–3 | 4–1 | | 0–0 | 3–1 | 2–2 | 5–4 | 24–12 | 42–15 |
| 5 | (Canada) Bianca Andreescu | 0–0 | 1–0 | 0–1 | 0–0 | | 0–0 | 1–0 | 1–0 | 3–1 | 48–5 |
| 6 | (Czech Republic) Petra Kvitová | 4–2 | 3–1 | 0–1 | 1–3 | 0–0 | | 4–1 | 7–2 | 19–10 | 37–13 |
| 7 | (Switzerland) Belinda Bencic | 0–0 | 1–0 | 3–1 | 2–2 | 0–1 | 1–4 | | 2–1 | 9–9 | 44–21 |
| 8 | (Ukraine) Elina Svitolina | 5–0 | 3–5 | 3–3 | 4–5 | 0–1 | 2–7 | 1–2 | | 18–23 | 35–21 |

=== Doubles ===
Below are the head-to-head records as they approached the tournament. 2019 WTA Finals – Doubles

| | | Mertens; Sabalenka | Hsieh; Strýcová | Babos; Mladenovic | Dabrowski; Xu | Chan; Chan | Krejčíková; Siniaková | Stosur; Zhang | Grönefeld; Schuurs | Overall | YTD |
| 1 | (Belgium) Elise Mertens (Belarus) Aryna Sabalenka | | 1–1 | 1–1 | 2–0 | 1–0 | 1–1 | 1–0 | 1–0 | 8–3 | 29–8 |
| 2 | (Chinese Taipei) Hsieh Su-wei (Czech Republic) Barbora Strýcová | 1–1 | | 1–0 | 3–0 | 2–1 | 0–0 | 1–0 | 2–0 | 10–2 | 28–8 |
| 3 | (Hungary) Tímea Babos (France) Kristina Mladenovic | 1–1 | 0–1 | | 1–0 | 0–0 | 2–0 | 2–1 | 0–0 | 6–3 | 23–7 |
| 4 | (Canada) Gabriela Dabrowski (China) Xu Yifan | 0–2 | 0–3 | 0–1 | | 0–1 | 2–0 | 1–1 | 0–1 | 3–9 | 33–19 |
| 5 | (Chinese Taipei) Chan Hao-ching (Chinese Taipei) Latisha Chan | 0–1 | 1–2 | 0–0 | 1–0 | | 0–2 | 1–1 | 2–3 | 5–9 | 40–16 |
| 6 | (Czech Republic) Barbora Krejčíková (Czech Republic) Kateřina Siniaková | 1–1 | 0–0 | 0–2 | 0–2 | 2–0 | | 0–1 | 2–0 | 5–6 | 23–10 |
| 7 | (Australia) Samantha Stosur (China) Zhang Shuai | 0–1 | 0–1 | 1–2 | 1–1 | 1–1 | 1–0 | | 0–0 | 4–6 | 20–12 |
| 8 | (Germany) Anna-Lena Grönefeld (Netherlands) Demi Schuurs | 0–1 | 0–2 | 0–0 | 1–0 | 3–2 | 0–2 | 0–0 | | 4–7 | 29–17 |

== See also ==
- 2019 WTA Tour
- 2019 WTA Elite Trophy
- 2019 ATP Finals
