= 2019 WTA Finals – Singles =

Singles
- 2019 WTA Finals

Final
- Champion: (Australia) Ashleigh Barty
- Runner-up: (Ukraine) Elina Svitolina
- Score: 6–4, 6–3

Details
- Draw: 8 (RR + elimination)
- Seeds: 8

Events
Singles	Doubles
- WTA Finals

Ashleigh Barty defeated defending champion Elina Svitolina in the final, 6–4, 6–3 to win the singles tennis title at the 2019 WTA Finals. With the win, Barty became the fifth woman (after Serena Williams, Maria Sharapova, Petra Kvitová, and Dominika Cibulková) to win the tournament on debut.

Barty won $4.42 million USD in prize money by claiming the title, the most prize money ever won by a player at a single tennis tournament, male or female. Barty secured the year-end world No. 1 ranking after playing her second round-robin match.

Barty, Bianca Andreescu, Belinda Bencic and Sofia Kenin (as an alternate replacing Andreescu) made their debuts in the event.

The tiebreak between Elina Svitolina and Karolína Plíšková in the round-robin stage, which Svitolina won 14–12, was the longest of the season.

== Seeds ==
1. (Australia) Ashleigh Barty (champion)
2. (Czech Republic) Karolína Plíšková (semifinals)
3. (Japan) Naomi Osaka (round robin, withdrew due to a right shoulder injury)
4. (Canada) Bianca Andreescu (round robin, withdrew due to a left knee injury)
5. (Romania) Simona Halep (round robin)
6. (Czech Republic) Petra Kvitová (round robin)
7. (Switzerland) Belinda Bencic (semifinals, retired)
8. (Ukraine) Elina Svitolina (final)

== Alternates ==
1. (Netherlands) Kiki Bertens (round robin, replaced Osaka, retired)
2. (United States) Sofia Kenin (round robin, replaced Andreescu)

== Draw ==
Key

- Q = Qualifier
- WC = Wild card
- LL = Lucky loser
- Alt = Alternate
- ITF = ITF entry
- PR = Protected ranking
- SR = Special ranking
- SE = Special exempt
- JE = Junior exempt
- JR = Junior Accelerator Programme entrant
- CO = College Accelerator Programme entrant
- NG = Next Gen Accelerator Program entrant
- w/o = Walkover
- r = Retired
- d = Defaulted

=== Finals ===
Semifinals
1	(Australia) Ashleigh Barty	4	6	6
2	(Czech Republic) Karolína Plíšková	6	2	3
8	(Ukraine) Elina Svitolina	5	6	4
7	(Switzerland) Belinda Bencic	7	3	1^{r}

Final
1	(Australia) Ashleigh Barty	6	6
8	(Ukraine) Elina Svitolina	4	3

=== Red group ===
		(Australia) Barty	(Japan) Osaka (Netherlands) Bertens	(Czech Republic) Kvitová	(Switzerland) Bencic	RR; W–L	Set; W–L	Game; W–L	Standings
1	(Australia) Ashleigh Barty		6–3, 3–6, 4–6 (w/ Bertens)	6–4, 6–2	5–7, 6–1, 6–2	2–1	5–3 (63%)	42–31 (58%)	1
3 Alt	(Japan) Naomi Osaka (Netherlands) Kiki Bertens	3–6, 6–3, 6–4 (w/ Bertens)		7–6^{(7–1)}, 4–6, 6–4 (w/ Osaka)	5–7, 0–1 ret. (w/ Bertens)	1–0; 1–1	2–1 (67%); 2–3^{†} (40%)	17–16 (52%); 15–13 (54%)	X 3
6	(Czech Republic) Petra Kvitová	4–6, 2–6	6–7^{(1–7)}, 6–4, 4–6 (w/ Osaka)		3–6, 6–1, 4–6	0–3	2–6 (25%)	35–42 (46%)	4
7	(Switzerland) Belinda Bencic	7–5, 1–6, 2–6	7–5, 1–0 ret. (w/ Bertens)	6–3, 1–6, 6–4		2–1	5–3 (63%)	23–30 (43%)	2

† Following WTA rules, Bertens' retirement against Bencic was counted as a straight-set loss in determining round robin standings.

=== Purple group ===
		(Czech Republic) Plíšková	(Canada) Andreescu (United States) Kenin	(Romania) Halep	(Ukraine) Svitolina	RR; W–L	Set; W–L	Game; W–L	Standings
2	(Czech Republic) Karolína Plíšková		6–3, ret. (w/ Andreescu)	6–0, 2–6, 6–4	6–7^{(12–14)}, 4–6	2–1	4–3 (57%)	24–23 (51%)	2
4 Alt	(Canada) Bianca Andreescu (United States) Sofia Kenin	3–6, ret. (w/ Andreescu)		6–3, 6–7^{(6–8)}, 3–6 (w/ Andreescu)	5–7, 6–7^{(10–12)} (w/ Kenin)	0–2; 0–1	1–4^{†} (20%); 0–2 (0%)	15–16 (48%); 11–14 (44%)	X 4
5	(Romania) Simona Halep	0–6, 6–2, 4–6	3–6, 7–6^{(8–6)}, 6–3 (w/ Andreescu)		5–7, 3–6	1–2	3–5 (38%)	34–42 (45%)	3
8	(Ukraine) Elina Svitolina	7–6^{(14–12)}, 6–4	7–5, 7–6^{(12–10)} (w/ Kenin)	7–5, 6–3		3–0	6–0 (100%)	40–29 (58%)	1

† Following WTA rules, Andreescu's retirement against Plíšková was counted as a straight-set loss in determining round robin standings.

Standings are determined by: 1. number of wins; 2. number of matches; 3. in two-player ties, head-to-head records; 4. in three-player ties, (a) percentage of sets won (head-to-head records if two players remain tied), then (b) percentage of games won (head-to-head records if two players remain tied), then (c) WTA rankings.
