= 2019 Brisbane International – Men's doubles =

Men's doubles
- 2019 Brisbane International

Final
- Champions: (New Zealand) Marcus Daniell (Netherlands) Wesley Koolhof
- Runners-up: (United States) Rajeev Ram (United Kingdom) Joe Salisbury
- Score: 6–4, 7–6^{(8–6)}

Details
- Draw: 16
- Seeds: 4

Events
Singles	men	women
Doubles	men	women
- Brisbane International

Henri Kontinen and John Peers were the defending doubles champions but lost in the first round to Kyle Edmund and Neal Skupski. The unseeded team of Marcus Daniell and Wesley Koolhof won the title, defeating Rajeev Ram and Joe Salisbury in the final, 6–4, 7–6^{(8–6)}.

== Seeds ==
1. (United States) Bob Bryan / (United States) Mike Bryan (first round)
2. (Japan) Ben McLachlan / (Germany) Jan-Lennard Struff (quarterfinals)
3. (Finland) Henri Kontinen / (Australia) John Peers (first round)
4. (United States) Rajeev Ram / (United Kingdom) Joe Salisbury (final)

== Draw ==
Key

- Q = Qualifier
- WC = Wild card
- LL = Lucky loser
- Alt = Alternate
- ITF = ITF entry
- PR = Protected ranking
- SR = Special ranking
- SE = Special exempt
- JE = Junior exempt
- JR = Junior Accelerator Programme entrant
- CO = College Accelerator Programme entrant
- NG = Next Gen Accelerator Program entrant
- w/o = Walkover
- r = Retired
- d = Defaulted

=== Draw ===
First round
1	(United States) B Bryan (United States) M Bryan	6	4	[7]
(Sweden) R Lindstedt (Canada) M Raonic	3	6	[10]
(Japan) K Nishikori (Japan) Y Nishioka	6^{12}	4
WC	(Australia) J Duckworth (Australia) J Thompson	7^{14}	6
4	(United States) R Ram (United Kingdom) J Salisbury	6	7
(Bulgaria) G Dimitrov (United States) R Harrison	2	5
(United States) A Krajicek (New Zealand) A Sitak	7	7^{7}
(United States) T Fritz (Australia) N Kyrgios	5	6^{4}
(New Zealand) M Daniell (Netherlands) W Koolhof	6	5	[10]
(Czech Republic) R Jebavý (Argentina) A Molteni	3	7	[6]
(United Kingdom) K Edmund (United Kingdom) N Skupski	7^{7}	6
3	(Finland) H Kontinen (Australia) J Peers	6^{4}	2
(Australia) J Millman (Australia) J-P Smith	6^{3}	6	[10]
(Brazil) M Demoliner (Russia) D Medvedev	7^{7}	4	[4]
WC	(Australia) A de Minaur (Australia) L Hewitt	3	1
2	(Japan) B McLachlan (Germany) J-L Struff	6	6

Quarterfinals
(Sweden) R Lindstedt (Canada) M Raonic	4	5
WC	(Australia) J Duckworth (Australia) J Thompson	6	7
4	(United States) R Ram (United Kingdom) J Salisbury	6	4	[10]
(United States) A Krajicek (New Zealand) A Sitak	2	6	[8]
(New Zealand) M Daniell (Netherlands) W Koolhof	6	7^{7}
(United Kingdom) K Edmund (United Kingdom) N Skupski	1	6^{5}
(Australia) J Millman (Australia) J-P Smith	7^{7}	6
2	(Japan) B McLachlan (Germany) J-L Struff	6^{5}	4

Semifinals
WC	(Australia) J Duckworth (Australia) J Thompson	6^{5}	3
4	(United States) R Ram (United Kingdom) J Salisbury	7^{7}	6
(New Zealand) M Daniell (Netherlands) W Koolhof	6^{4}	7^{7}	[10]
(Australia) J Millman (Australia) J-P Smith	7^{7}	6^{2}	[8]

Final
4	(United States) R Ram (United Kingdom) J Salisbury	4	6^{6}
(New Zealand) M Daniell (Netherlands) W Koolhof	6	7^{8}
