= 2019 Brisbane International – Men's singles =

Men's singles
- 2019 Brisbane International

Final
- Champion: (Japan) Kei Nishikori
- Runner-up: (Russia) Daniil Medvedev
- Score: 6–4, 3–6, 6–2

Details
- Draw: 28 (4 Q / 3 WC )
- Seeds: 8

Events
| Singles | men | women |
| Doubles | men | women |
- Brisbane International

Kei Nishikori defeated Daniil Medvedev in the final, 6–4, 3–6, 6–2 to win the men's singles tennis title at the 2019 Brisbane International. The win ended Nishikori's streak of nine consecutive finals lost on the ATP Tour.

Nick Kyrgios was the defending champion, but lost in the second round to Jérémy Chardy.

== Seeds ==
The top four seeds receive a bye into the second round.

1. (Spain) Rafael Nadal (withdrew due to injury)
2. (Japan) Kei Nishikori (champion)
3. (United Kingdom) Kyle Edmund (second round)
4. (Russia) Daniil Medvedev (final)
5. (Canada) Milos Raonic (quarterfinals)
6. (Bulgaria) Grigor Dimitrov (quarterfinals)
7. (Australia) Alex de Minaur (quarterfinals)
8. (Australia) Nick Kyrgios (second round)

== Draw ==
=== Finals ===
Semifinals
PR | (France) Jo-Wilfried Tsonga | 6^{6} | 2
4 | (Russia) Daniil Medvedev | 7^{8} | 6
(France) Jérémy Chardy | 2 | 2
2 | (Japan) Kei Nishikori | 6 | 6

Final
4 | (Russia) Daniil Medvedev | 4 | 6 | 2
2 | (Japan) Kei Nishikori | 6 | 3 | 6

=== Top half ===
First round
Q | (Australia) T Kokkinakis | 6^{6} | 4
PR | (France) J-W Tsonga | 7^{8} | 6
WC | (Australia) A Bolt | 3 | 0
(Australia) J Thompson | 6 | 6
WC | (Australia) A Popyrin | 2 | 2
7 | (Australia) A de Minaur | 6 | 6
WC | (Australia) J Duckworth | 3 | 4
PR | (United Kingdom) A Murray | 6 | 6
(Argentina) L Mayer | 3 | 1
Q | (Serbia) M Kecmanović | 6 | 6
(Slovenia) A Bedene | 0 | 3
5 | (Canada) M Raonic | 6 | 6

Second round
LL | (Japan) T Daniel | 6^{5} | 3
PR | (France) J-W Tsonga | 7^{7} | 6
(Australia) J Thompson | 4 | 2
7 | (Australia) A de Minaur | 6 | 6
4 | (Russia) D Medvedev | 7 | 6
PR | (United Kingdom) A Murray | 5 | 2
Q | (Serbia) M Kecmanović | 3 | 6^{2}
5 | (Canada) M Raonic | 6 | 7^{7}

Quarterfinals
PR | (France) J-W Tsonga | 6 | 7^{7}
7 | (Australia) A de Minaur | 4 | 6^{2}
4 | (Russia) D Medvedev | 6^{2} | 6 | 6
5 | (Canada) M Raonic | 7^{7} | 3 | 4

Semifinals
PR | (France) J-W Tsonga | 6^{6} | 2
4 | (Russia) D Medvedev | 7^{8} | 6

=== Bottom half ===
First round
8 | (Australia) N Kyrgios | 7^{7} | 5 | 7^{7}
(United States) R Harrison | 6^{5} | 7 | 6^{5}
(France) J Chardy | 4 | 6 | 6
(Germany) J-L Struff | 6 | 3 | 4
Q | (Japan) Y Uchiyama | 6 | 7^{8}
Q | (France) U Humbert | 4 | 6^{6}
6 | (Bulgaria) G Dimitrov | 6 | 6
(Japan) Y Nishioka | 3 | 4
(Australia) J Millman | 7^{8} | 6^{6} | 6
(United States) T Sandgren | 6^{6} | 7^{8} | 0
(United States) T Fritz | 6^{5} | 7^{7} | 4
(United States) D Kudla | 7^{7} | 6^{2} | 6

Second round
8 | (Australia) N Kyrgios | 7^{7} | 2 | 3
(France) J Chardy | 6^{5} | 6 | 6
Q | (Japan) Y Uchiyama | 7^{8} | 6
3 | (United Kingdom) K Edmund | 6^{6} | 4
6 | (Bulgaria) G Dimitrov | 6 | 6
(Australia) J Millman | 3 | 4
(United States) D Kudla | 5 | 2
2 | (Japan) K Nishikori | 7 | 6

Quarterfinals
(France) J Chardy | 6 | 3 | 7^{7}
Q | (Japan) Y Uchiyama | 4 | 6 | 6^{4}
6 | (Bulgaria) G Dimitrov | 5 | 5
2 | (Japan) K Nishikori | 7 | 7

Semifinals
(France) J Chardy | 2 | 2
2 | (Japan) K Nishikori | 6 | 6

== Qualifying ==
=== Seeds ===
1. (United States) Bradley Klahn (first round)
2. (Japan) Taro Daniel (qualifying competition, lucky loser)
3. (Chile) Cristian Garín (qualifying competition)
4. (United States) Reilly Opelka (first round)
5. (France) Ugo Humbert (qualified)
6. (Canada) Peter Polansky (first round)
7. (Serbia) Miomir Kecmanović (qualified)
8. (United States) Bjorn Fratangelo (first round)

=== Qualifiers ===
1. (France) Ugo Humbert
2. (Serbia) Miomir Kecmanović
3. (Australia) Thanasi Kokkinakis
4. (Japan) Yasutaka Uchiyama

=== Lucky loser ===
1. (Japan) Taro Daniel

=== Qualifying draw ===
==== First qualifier ====
First round
1 | (United States) Bradley Klahn | 6 | 4 | 6^{6}
(United States) Christopher Eubanks | 3 | 6 | 7^{8}
WC | (Australia) Blake Ellis | 4 | 3
5 | (France) Ugo Humbert | 6 | 6

Qualifying competition
(United States) Christopher Eubanks | 2 | 3
5 | (France) Ugo Humbert | 6 | 6

==== Second qualifier ====
First round
2 | (Japan) Taro Daniel | 3 | 6 | 6
(Australia) John-Patrick Smith | 6 | 4 | 4
(Australia) Maverick Banes | 2 | 2
7 | (Serbia) Miomir Kecmanović | 6 | 6

Qualifying competition
2 | (Japan) Taro Daniel | 5 | 7^{11} | 3
7 | (Serbia) Miomir Kecmanović | 7 | 6^{9} | 6

==== Third qualifier ====
First round
3 | (Chile) Cristian Garín | 6 | 6
WC | (Australia) Christopher O'Connell | 4 | 4
(Australia) Thanasi Kokkinakis | 6 | 6
6 | (Canada) Peter Polansky | 3 | 4

Qualifying competition
3 | (Chile) Cristian Garín | 2 | 4
(Australia) Thanasi Kokkinakis | 6 | 6

==== Fourth qualifier ====
First round
4 | (United States) Reilly Opelka | 3 | 7^{7} | 6^{3}
(Australia) Marc Polmans | 6 | 6^{1} | 7^{7}
(Japan) Yasutaka Uchiyama | 7^{7} | 6
8 | (United States) Bjorn Fratangelo | 6^{5} | 4

Qualifying competition
(Australia) Marc Polmans | 2 | 2
(Japan) Yasutaka Uchiyama | 6 | 6
