= 2019 WTA Finals – Doubles =

Doubles
- 2019 WTA Finals

Final
- Champions: (Hungary) Tímea Babos (France) Kristina Mladenovic
- Runners-up: (Chinese Taipei) Hsieh Su-wei (Czech Republic) Barbora Strýcová
- Score: 6–1, 6–3

Details
- Draw: 8
- Seeds: 8

Events
Singles	Doubles
- WTA Finals

Defending champions Tímea Babos and Kristina Mladenovic defeated Hsieh Su-wei and Barbora Strýcová in the final, 6–1, 6–3 to win the doubles tennis title at the 2019 WTA Finals. It was Babos’ third straight title, as she also won in 2017 (partnering Andrea Sestini Hlaváčková).

Strýcová secured the year-end world No. 1 ranking by reaching the final. Aryna Sabalenka and Mladenovic were also in contention for the individual top ranking. The team of Babos and Mladenovic ended the year as the No. 1 doubles team.

The competition returned to a round-robin format for the first time since 2015.

== Seeds ==
1. (Belgium) Elise Mertens / (Belarus) Aryna Sabalenka (round robin)
2. (Chinese Taipei) Hsieh Su-wei / (Czech Republic) Barbora Strýcová (final)
3. (Hungary) Tímea Babos / (France) Kristina Mladenovic (champions)
4. (Canada) Gabriela Dabrowski / (China) Xu Yifan (round robin)
5. (Chinese Taipei) Chan Hao-ching / (Chinese Taipei) Latisha Chan (round robin)
6. (Czech Republic) Barbora Krejčíková / (Czech Republic) Kateřina Siniaková (round robin)
7. (Australia) Samantha Stosur / (China) Zhang Shuai (semifinals)
8. (Germany) Anna-Lena Grönefeld / (Netherlands) Demi Schuurs (semifinals)

== Alternates ==
1. (United States) Nicole Melichar / (Czech Republic) Květa Peschke (Did not play)

== Draw ==
Key

- Q = Qualifier
- WC = Wild card
- LL = Lucky loser
- Alt = Alternate
- ITF = ITF entry
- PR = Protected ranking
- SR = Special ranking
- SE = Special exempt
- JE = Junior exempt
- JR = Junior Accelerator Programme entrant
- CO = College Accelerator Programme entrant
- NG = Next Gen Accelerator Program entrant
- w/o = Walkover
- r = Retired
- d = Defaulted

=== Finals ===
Semifinals
3	(Hungary) Tímea Babos (France) Kristina Mladenovic	1	6	[10]
7	(Australia) Samantha Stosur (China) Zhang Shuai	6	4	[8]
8	(Germany) Anna-Lena Grönefeld (Netherlands) Demi Schuurs	1	2
2	(Chinese Taipei) Hsieh Su-wei (Czech Republic) Barbora Strýcová	6	6

Final
3	(Hungary) Tímea Babos (France) Kristina Mladenovic	6	6
2	(Chinese Taipei) Hsieh Su-wei (Czech Republic) Barbora Strýcová	1	3

=== Red group ===
		(Belgium) Mertens (Belarus) Sabalenka	(Hungary) Babos (France) Mladenovic	(Chinese Taipei) Chan (Chinese Taipei) Chan	(Germany) Grönefeld (Netherlands) Schuurs	RR W–L	Set W–L	Game W–L	Standings
1	(Belgium) Elise Mertens (Belarus) Aryna Sabalenka		6–4, 2–6, [5–10]	7–6^{(7–5)}, 6–4	5–7, 6–1, [7–10]	1–2	4–4 (50%)	32–30 (52%)	3
3	(Hungary) Tímea Babos (France) Kristina Mladenovic	4–6, 6–2, [10–5]		6–2, 5–7, [10–6]	7–5, 6–2	3–0	6–2 (75%)	36–24 (60%)	1
5	(Chinese Taipei) Chan Hao-ching (Chinese Taipei) Latisha Chan	6–7^{(5–7)}, 4–6	2–6, 7–5, [6–10]		2–6, 4–6	0–3	1–6 (14%)	25–37 (40%)	4
8	(Germany) Anna-Lena Grönefeld (Netherlands) Demi Schuurs	7–5, 1–6, [10–7]	5–7, 2–6	6–2, 6–4		2–1	4–3 (57%)	28–30 (48%)	2

=== Purple group ===
		(Chinese Taipei) Hsieh (Czech Republic) Strýcová	(Canada) Dabrowski (China) Xu	(Czech Republic) Krejčíková (Czech Republic) Siniaková	(Australia) Stosur (China) Zhang	RR W–L	Set W–L	Game W–L	Standings
2	(Chinese Taipei) Hsieh Su-wei (Czech Republic) Barbora Strýcová		6–2, 4–6, [9–11]	6–2, 1–6, [10–5]	6–4, 4–6, [10–5]	2–1	5–4 (56%)	29–27 (52%)	1
4	(Canada) Gabriela Dabrowski (China) Xu Yifan	2–6, 6–4, [11–9]		4–6, 2–6	6–4, 4–6, [5–10]	1–2	3–5 (38%)	25–33 (43%)	4
6	(Czech Republic) Barbora Krejčíková (Czech Republic) Kateřina Siniaková	2–6, 6–1, [5–10]	6–4, 6–2		3–6, 6–7^{(7–9)}	1–2	3–4 (42%)	29–27 (52%)	3
7	(Australia) Samantha Stosur (China) Zhang Shuai	4–6, 6–4, [5–10]	4–6, 6–4, [10–5]	6–3, 7–6^{(9–7)}		2–1	5–3 (63%)	34–30 (53%)	2

Standings are determined by: 1. number of wins; 2. number of matches; 3. in two-player ties, head-to-head records; 4. in three-player ties, (a) percentage of sets won (head-to-head records if two players remain tied), then (b) percentage of games won (head-to-head records if two players remain tied), then (c) WTA rankings.
