= 2019 Brisbane International – Women's doubles =

Women's doubles
- 2019 Brisbane International

Final
- Champions: (United States) Nicole Melichar (Czech Republic) Květa Peschke
- Runners-up: (Chinese Taipei) Chan Hao-ching (Chinese Taipei) Latisha Chan
- Score: 6–1, 6–1

Details
- Draw: 16
- Seeds: 3

Events
Singles	men	women
Doubles	men	women
- Brisbane International

Kiki Bertens and Demi Schuurs were the defending doubles champions but lost in the first round to Kristina Mladenovic and Galina Voskoboeva.

The third-seeded team of Nicole Melichar and Květa Peschke won the title, defeating Chan Hao-ching and Latisha Chan in the final, 6–1, 6–1.

== Seeds ==
1. (Czech Republic) Barbora Krejčíková / (Czech Republic) Kateřina Siniaková (semifinals)
2. (Canada) Gabriela Dabrowski / (China) Xu Yifan (semifinals)
3. (United States) Nicole Melichar / (Czech Republic) Květa Peschke (champions)
4. (Chinese Taipei) Chan Hao-ching / (Chinese Taipei) Latisha Chan (final)

== Draw ==
Key

- Q = Qualifier
- WC = Wild card
- LL = Lucky loser
- Alt = Alternate
- ITF = ITF entry
- PR = Protected ranking
- SR = Special ranking
- SE = Special exempt
- JE = Junior exempt
- JR = Junior Accelerator Programme entrant
- CO = College Accelerator Programme entrant
- NG = Next Gen Accelerator Program entrant
- w/o = Walkover
- r = Retired
- d = Defaulted

=== Draw ===
First round
1	(Czech Republic) B Krejčíková (Czech Republic) K Siniaková	6	6
(Romania) M Buzărnescu (Ukraine) N Kichenok	4	0
(Czech Republic) L Hradecká (Slovenia) A Klepač	6	6
WC	(Belgium) E Mertens (Australia) S Stosur	4	2
3	(United States) N Melichar (Czech Republic) K Peschke	6	7
(Russia) D Kasatkina (Estonia) A Kontaveit	4	5
(Germany) A-L Grönefeld (United States) V King	6^{3}	6^{4}
Alt	(Serbia) O Danilović (Russia) A Potapova	7^{7}	7^{7}
(Netherlands) K Bertens (Netherlands) D Schuurs	3	5
(France) K Mladenovic (Kazakhstan) G Voskoboeva	6	7
(Japan) M Kato (Japan) M Ninomiya	1	2
4	(Chinese Taipei) H-c Chan (Chinese Taipei) L Chan	6	6
(Latvia) A Sevastova (Ukraine) E Svitolina	0	4
(Japan) E Hozumi (Poland) A Rosolska	6	6
(United States) R Atawo (Slovenia) K Srebotnik	4	6	[5]
2	(Canada) G Dabrowski (China) Y Xu	6	4	[10]

Quarterfinals
1	(Czech Republic) B Krejčíková (Czech Republic) K Siniaková	6	6
(Czech Republic) L Hradecká (Slovenia) A Klepač	3	2
3	(United States) N Melichar (Czech Republic) K Peschke	7	6
Alt	(Serbia) O Danilović (Russia) A Potapova	5	1
(France) K Mladenovic (Kazakhstan) G Voskoboeva	1	5
4	(Chinese Taipei) H-c Chan (Chinese Taipei) L Chan	6	7
(Japan) E Hozumi (Poland) A Rosolska	2	5
2	(Canada) G Dabrowski (China) Y Xu	6	7

Semifinals
1	(Czech Republic) B Krejčíková (Czech Republic) K Siniaková	2	5
3	(United States) N Melichar (Czech Republic) K Peschke	6	7
4	(Chinese Taipei) H-c Chan (Chinese Taipei) L Chan	6	4	[10]
2	(Canada) G Dabrowski (China) Y Xu	2	6	[8]

Final
3	(United States) N Melichar (Czech Republic) K Peschke	6	6
4	(Chinese Taipei) H-c Chan (Chinese Taipei) L Chan	1	1
