= 2019 Mutua Madrid Open – Women's singles =

Women's singles
- 2019 Mutua Madrid Open

Final
- Champion: (Netherlands) Kiki Bertens
- Runner-up: (Romania) Simona Halep
- Score: 6–4, 6–4

Details
- Draw: 64 (8 Q / 5 WC )
- Seeds: 16

Events
Singles	men	women
Doubles	men	women
← 2018 ·	Mutua Madrid Open	· 2021 →

Kiki Bertens defeated Simona Halep in the final, 6–4, 6–4 to win the women's singles tennis title at the 2019 Madrid Open. She did not lose a set en route to the title, the first to do so since the women's singles event was created in 2009.

Petra Kvitová was the defending champion, but lost to Bertens in the quarterfinals in a rematch of the previous year's final.

Naomi Osaka, Halep and Angelique Kerber were in contention for the world No. 1 singles ranking at the beginning of the tournament. Osaka retained the ranking following Kerber's withdrawal in the second round, and Halep's subsequent defeat in the final.

== Seeds ==
1. (Japan) Naomi Osaka (quarterfinals)
2. (Czech Republic) Petra Kvitová (quarterfinals)
3. (Romania) Simona Halep (final)
4. (Germany) Angelique Kerber (second round, withdrew)
5. (Czech Republic) Karolína Plíšková (second round)
6. (Ukraine) Elina Svitolina (first round)
7. (Netherlands) Kiki Bertens (champion)
8. (United States) Sloane Stephens (semifinals)

9. (Australia) Ashleigh Barty (quarterfinals)
10. (Belarus) Aryna Sabalenka (first round)
11. (Denmark) Caroline Wozniacki (first round, retired)
12. (Latvia) Anastasija Sevastova (third round)
13. (United States) Madison Keys (first round)
14. (Estonia) Anett Kontaveit (first round)
15. (China) Wang Qiang (first round)
16. (Germany) Julia Görges (first round)

Click on the seed number of a player to go to their draw section.

== Draw ==
=== Key ===
- Q = Qualifier
- WC = Wild card
- LL = Lucky loser
- Alt = Alternate
- ITF = ITF entry
- PR = Protected ranking
- SR = Special ranking
- SE = Special exempt
- JE = Junior exempt
- JR = Junior Accelerator Programme entrant
- CO = College Accelerator Programme entrant
- NG = Next Gen Accelerator Program entrant
- w/o = Walkover
- r = Retired
- d = Defaulted

=== Finals ===
Quarterfinals
1	(Japan) Naomi Osaka	6	2	5
(Switzerland) Belinda Bencic	3	6	7
3	(Romania) Simona Halep	7	7
9	(Australia) Ashleigh Barty	5	5
8	(United States) Sloane Stephens	6	6
(Croatia) Petra Martić	4	3
7	(Netherlands) Kiki Bertens	6	6
2	(Czech Republic) Petra Kvitová	2	3

Semifinals
(Switzerland) Belinda Bencic	2	7^{7}	0
3	(Romania) Simona Halep	6	6^{2}	6
8	(United States) Sloane Stephens	2	5
7	(Netherlands) Kiki Bertens	6	7

Final
3	(Romania) Simona Halep	4	4
7	(Netherlands) Kiki Bertens	6	6

=== Top half ===
==== Section 1 ====
First round
1	(Japan) N Osaka	6	7^{8}
(Slovakia) D Cibulková	2	6^{6}
WC	(Spain) L Arruabarrena	4	6	1
WC	(Spain) S Sorribes Tormo	6	3	6
(Belgium) E Mertens	5	6^{5}
Q	(Slovakia) AK Schmiedlová	7	7^{7}
(Belarus) A Sasnovich	0	6	6
14	(Estonia) A Kontaveit	6	3	2
10	(Belarus) A Sabalenka	5	4
WC	(Russia) S Kuznetsova	7	6
(Belgium) A Van Uytvanck	4	3
(Switzerland) B Bencic	6	6
Q	(Ukraine) K Kozlova	6	6
(China) S Zhang	3	2
(Ukraine) D Yastremska	7	6^{5}	3
5	(Czech Republic) Ka Plíšková	5	7^{7}	6

Second round
1	(Japan) N Osaka	7^{7}	3	6
WC	(Spain) S Sorribes Tormo	6^{5}	6	0
Q	(Slovakia) AK Schmiedlová	2	2
(Belarus) A Sasnovich	6	6
WC	(Russia) S Kuznetsova	6^{4}	6	3
(Switzerland) B Bencic	7^{7}	2	6
Q	(Ukraine) K Kozlova	7	2	6
5	(Czech Republic) Ka Plíšková	5	6	4

Third round
1	(Japan) N Osaka	6	6
(Belarus) A Sasnovich	2	3
(Switzerland) B Bencic	6	6
Q	(Ukraine) K Kozlova	0	2

Quarterfinals
1	(Japan) N Osaka	6	2	5
(Switzerland) B Bencic	3	6	7

==== Section 2 ====
First round
3	(Romania) S Halep	6	6
Q	(Russia) M Gasparyan	0	4
(United States) A Riske	4	1
(United Kingdom) J Konta	6	6
(Greece) M Sakkari	3	3
(Spain) C Suárez Navarro	6	6
(Slovakia) V Kužmová	7	6
16	(Germany) J Görges	5	4
9	(Australia) A Barty	6	6
(Australia) D Gavrilova	1	2
Q	(Russia) V Zvonareva	1	4
(United States) D Collins	6	6
WC	(Romania) I-C Begu	4	3
(Kazakhstan) Y Putintseva	6	6
(France) P Parmentier	6	7^{8}
6	(Ukraine) E Svitolina	4	6^{6}

Second round
3	(Romania) S Halep	7	6
(United Kingdom) J Konta	5	1
(Spain) C Suárez Navarro	4	6^{2}
(Slovakia) V Kužmová	6	7^{7}
9	(Australia) A Barty	6	1	6
(United States) D Collins	1	6	1
(Kazakhstan) Y Putintseva	6	4	6
(France) P Parmentier	4	6	3

Third round
3	(Romania) S Halep	6	6
(Slovakia) V Kužmová	0	0
9	(Australia) A Barty	4	6	6
(Kazakhstan) Y Putintseva	6	1	2

Quarterfinals
3	(Romania) S Halep	7	7
9	(Australia) A Barty	5	5

=== Bottom half ===
==== Section 3 ====
First round
8	(United States) S Stephens	6	7^{7}
Q	(Slovenia) P Hercog	2	6^{4}
(Russia) D Kasatkina	5	4
(Belarus) V Azarenka	7	6
(China) Y Wang	5	6^{3}
(China) S Zheng	7	7^{7}
(France) A Cornet	3
11	(Denmark) C Wozniacki	0^{r}
15	(China) Q Wang	5	4
(Croatia) D Vekić	7	6
Q	(Czech Republic) Kr Plíšková	3	6	6
Q	(Ukraine) M Kostyuk	6	3	2
(Croatia) P Martić	7	7^{7}
(Spain) G Muguruza	5	6^{2}
(Ukraine) L Tsurenko	3	2
4	(Germany) A Kerber	6	6

Second round
8	(United States) S Stephens	6	2	6
(Belarus) V Azarenka	4	6	2
(China) S Zheng	6	3	6
(France) A Cornet	2	6	4
(Croatia) D Vekić	6	6
Q	(Czech Republic) Kr Plíšková	4	4
(Croatia) P Martić	w/o
4	(Germany) A Kerber

Third round
8	(United States) S Stephens	3	6	6
(China) S Zheng	6	3	2
(Croatia) D Vekić	6	3	0^{r}
(Croatia) P Martić	4	6	3

Quarterfinals
8	(United States) S Stephens	6	6
(Croatia) P Martić	4	3

==== Section 4 ====
First round
7	(Netherlands) K Bertens	6	6
(Czech Republic) K Siniaková	3	2
(Russia) A Pavlyuchenkova	2	1
(Latvia) J Ostapenko	6	6
(Romania) M Buzărnescu	6	6
(Australia) A Tomljanović	3	2
(Belgium) K Flipkens	6	3	2
12	(Latvia) A Sevastova	0	6	6
13	(United States) M Keys	6	4	1
WC	(Romania) S Cîrstea	3	6	6
(Chinese Taipei) S-w Hsieh	5	2
(France) C Garcia	7	6
(Czech Republic) B Strýcová	3	1
Q	(France) K Mladenovic	6	6
(United States) S Kenin	1	4
2	(Czech Republic) P Kvitová	6	6

Second round
7	(Netherlands) K Bertens	6	6
(Latvia) J Ostapenko	4	3
(Romania) M Buzărnescu	3	4
12	(Latvia) A Sevastova	6	6
WC	(Romania) S Cîrstea	4	6	1
(France) C Garcia	6	3	6
Q	(France) K Mladenovic	3	6^{5}
2	(Czech Republic) P Kvitová	6	7^{7}

Third round
7	(Netherlands) K Bertens	6	6
12	(Latvia) A Sevastova	1	2
(France) C Garcia	3	3
2	(Czech Republic) P Kvitová	6	6

Quarterfinals
7	(Netherlands) K Bertens	6	6
2	(Czech Republic) P Kvitová	2	3

== Qualifying ==
=== Seeds ===
1. (United States) Amanda Anisimova (first round)
2. (Russia) Ekaterina Alexandrova (first round)
3. (Germany) Tatjana Maria (first round)
4. (Puerto Rico) Monica Puig (first round)
5. (Serbia) Aleksandra Krunić (first round)
6. (France) Kristina Mladenovic (qualified)
7. (Russia) Margarita Gasparyan (qualified)
8. (Germany) Andrea Petkovic (qualifying competition)
9. (Belarus) Vera Lapko (first round)
10. (Slovenia) Polona Hercog (qualified)
11. (Slovakia) Magdaléna Rybáriková (first round, retired)
12. (Russia) Anastasia Potapova (qualifying competition)
13. (Australia) Samantha Stosur (first round)
14. (Russia) Veronika Kudermetova (first round)
15. (United States) Jessica Pegula (qualifying competition)
16. (Estonia) Kaia Kanepi (qualifying competition)

=== Qualifiers ===
1. (Ukraine) Marta Kostyuk
2. (Ukraine) Kateryna Kozlova
3. (Russia) Vera Zvonareva
4. (Slovakia) Anna Karolína Schmiedlová
5. (Czech Republic) Kristýna Plíšková
6. (France) Kristina Mladenovic
7. (Russia) Margarita Gasparyan
8. (Slovenia) Polona Hercog

=== Draw ===
==== First qualifier ====
First round
1	(United States) Amanda Anisimova	0	6	0
WC	(Ukraine) Marta Kostyuk	6	2	6
WC	(Romania) Irina Bara	7	0
11	(Slovakia) Magdaléna Rybáriková	5	0^{r}

Qualifying competition
WC	(Ukraine) Marta Kostyuk	7	3	6
WC	(Romania) Irina Bara	5	6	2

==== Second qualifier ====
First round
2	(Russia) Ekaterina Alexandrova	4	4
(Ukraine) Kateryna Kozlova	6	6
WC	(Spain) Aliona Bolsova	6	6
9	(Belarus) Vera Lapko	2	2

Qualifying competition
(Ukraine) Kateryna Kozlova	6	6
WC	(Spain) Aliona Bolsova	3	3

==== Third qualifier ====
First round
3	(Germany) Tatjana Maria	4	0
(Russia) Vera Zvonareva	6	6
(Poland) Magda Linette	6	4	2
12	(Russia) Anastasia Potapova	1	6	6

Qualifying competition
(Russia) Vera Zvonareva	4	6	7^{7}
12	(Russia) Anastasia Potapova	6	2	6^{4}

==== Fourth qualifier ====
First round
4	(Puerto Rico) Monica Puig	6^{2}	2
(Slovakia) Anna Karolína Schmiedlová	7^{7}	6
(Japan) Misaki Doi	2	6	3
15	(United States) Jessica Pegula	6	1	6

Qualifying competition
(Slovakia) Anna Karolína Schmiedlová	4	7^{7}	7
15	(United States) Jessica Pegula	6	6^{4}	5

==== Fifth qualifier ====
First round
5	(Serbia) Aleksandra Krunić	2	4
(Czech Republic) Kristýna Plíšková	6	6
(Luxembourg) Mandy Minella	4	6	2
16	(Estonia) Kaia Kanepi	6	3	6

Qualifying competition
(Czech Republic) Kristýna Plíšková	7^{7}	6
16	(Estonia) Kaia Kanepi	6^{1}	2

==== Sixth qualifier ====
First round
6	(France) Kristina Mladenovic	7	6
(Serbia) Ivana Jorović	5	4
(Germany) Laura Siegemund	5	6	7
13	(Australia) Samantha Stosur	7	4	5

Qualifying competition
6	(France) Kristina Mladenovic	7^{7}	6
(Germany) Laura Siegemund	6^{5}	1

==== Seventh qualifier ====
First round
7	(Russia) Margarita Gasparyan	3	6	6
(Germany) Mona Barthel	6	1	1
(United States) Jennifer Brady	7^{7}	7^{10}
14	(Russia) Veronika Kudermetova	6^{5}	6^{8}

Qualifying competition
7	(Russia) Margarita Gasparyan	6	7^{7}
(United States) Jennifer Brady	4	6^{5}

==== Eighth qualifier ====
First round
8	(Germany) Andrea Petkovic	7	5	6
WC	(Serbia) Olga Danilović	5	7	2
(Switzerland) Viktorija Golubic	4	1
10	(Slovenia) Polona Hercog	6	6

Qualifying competition
8	(Germany) Andrea Petkovic	6	6^{4}	1
10	(Slovenia) Polona Hercog	4	7^{7}	6
