= 2019 Brisbane International – Women's singles =

Coordinates: 27°31′30″S 153°0′26″E

Women's singles
- 2019 Brisbane International

Final
- Champion: (Czech Republic) Karolína Plíšková
- Runner-up: (Ukraine) Lesia Tsurenko
- Score: 4–6, 7–5, 6–2

Details
- Draw: 30 (4 Q / 4 WC )
- Seeds: 8

Events
Singles	men	women
Doubles	men	women
- Brisbane International

Elina Svitolina was the defending champion, but lost to Aliaksandra Sasnovich – in a repeat of the previous year's final – in the second round.

Karolína Plíšková won the title, defeating Lesia Tsurenko in the final, 4–6, 7–5, 6–2.

== Seeds ==
The top two seeds received a bye into the second round.

1. (Ukraine) Elina Svitolina (second round)
2. (Japan) Naomi Osaka (semifinals)
3. (United States) Sloane Stephens (first round)
4. (Czech Republic) Petra Kvitová (second round)
5. (Czech Republic) Karolína Plíšková (champion)
6. (Netherlands) Kiki Bertens (second round)
7. (Russia) Daria Kasatkina (first round)
8. (Latvia) Anastasija Sevastova (quarterfinals)

== Draw ==
=== Finals ===
Semifinals
(Croatia) Donna Vekić	3	4
5	(Czech Republic) Karolína Plíšková	6	6
(Ukraine) Lesia Tsurenko	6	6
2	(Japan) Naomi Osaka	2	4

Final
5	(Czech Republic) Karolína Plíšková	4	7	6
(Ukraine) Lesia Tsurenko	6	5	2

=== Top half ===
First round
(Belarus) A Sasnovich	6	7
Q	(Russia) A Potapova	4	5
(Croatia) D Vekić	6	6
(Slovakia) M Rybáriková	1	2
(Belgium) E Mertens	2	7^{8}	4
6	(Netherlands) K Bertens	6	6^{6}	6
3	(United States) S Stephens	4	3
(United Kingdom) J Konta	6	6
(Czech Republic) K Siniaková	6	3	0
(Australia) A Tomljanović	1	6	6
Q	(Czech Republic) M Bouzková	4	6	6
WC	(Australia) S Stosur	6	2	2
(Kazakhstan) Y Putintseva	6	3	4
5	(Czech Republic) Ka Plíšková	4	6	6

Second round
1	(Ukraine) E Svitolina	4	6	3
(Belarus) A Sasnovich	6	0	6
(Croatia) D Vekić	7^{7}	1	7
6	(Netherlands) K Bertens	6^{5}	6	5
(United Kingdom) J Konta	2	6^{2}
(Australia) A Tomljanović	6	7^{7}
Q	(Czech Republic) M Bouzková	5	2
5	(Czech Republic) Ka Plíšková	7	6

Quarterfinals
(Belarus) A Sasnovich	2	0
(Croatia) D Vekić	6	6
(Australia) A Tomljanović	1	6	1
5	(Czech Republic) Ka Plíšková	6	1	6

Semifinals
(Croatia) D Vekić	3	4
5	(Czech Republic) Ka Plíšková	6	6

=== Bottom half ===
First round
7	(Russia) D Kasatkina	7	4	6^{3}
WC	(Australia) K Birrell	5	6	7^{7}
(Romania) M Buzărnescu	0	2
(Ukraine) L Tsurenko	6	6
(Estonia) A Kontaveit	6	6
(Spain) C Suárez Navarro	0	3
(United States) D Collins	7^{8}	6^{6}	3
4	(Czech Republic) P Kvitová	6^{6}	7^{8}	6
8	(Latvia) A Sevastova	6	6
(Australia) D Gavrilova	3	3
Q	(United Kingdom) H Dart	1	6	6
WC	(Australia) P Hon	6	3	4
(France) K Mladenovic	3	6^{2}
Q	(Australia) D Aiava	6	7^{7}

Second round
WC	(Australia) K Birrell	4	3
(Ukraine) L Tsurenko	6	6
(Estonia) A Kontaveit	7	7^{7}
4	(Czech Republic) P Kvitová	5	6^{1}
8	(Latvia) A Sevastova	6	6
Q	(United Kingdom) H Dart	2	0
Q	(Australia) D Aiava	3	2
2	(Japan) N Osaka	6	6

Quarterfinals
(Ukraine) L Tsurenko	7	6
(Estonia) A Kontaveit	5	3
8	(Latvia) A Sevastova	6	0	4
2	(Japan) N Osaka	3	6	6

Semifinals
(Ukraine) L Tsurenko	6	6
2	(Japan) N Osaka	2	4

== Qualifying ==
=== Seeds ===
1. (Serbia) Aleksandra Krunić (first round)
2. (Ukraine) Dayana Yastremska (second round, retired)
3. (Germany) Andrea Petkovic (qualifying competition)
4. (United States) Bernarda Pera (first round)
5. (United Kingdom) Heather Watson (first round)
6. (Russia) Anastasia Potapova (qualified)
7. (Ukraine) Kateryna Kozlova (second round)
8. (Luxembourg) Mandy Minella (second round)

=== Qualifiers ===
1. (Australia) Destanee Aiava
2. (Russia) Anastasia Potapova
3. (United Kingdom) Harriet Dart
4. (Czech Republic) Marie Bouzková

=== Qualifying draw ===
==== First qualifier ====
First round
1	(Serbia) Aleksandra Krunić	3	0
(United States) Christina McHale	6	6
(Bulgaria) Viktoriya Tomova	4	7^{10}	6
(United States) Jennifer Brady	6	6^{8}	2
WC	(Australia) Destanee Aiava	6	6
PR	(United States) Vania King	3	4
(Japan) Kurumi Nara	6	1	6^{9}
8	(Luxembourg) Mandy Minella	3	6	7^{11}

Second round
(United States) Christina McHale	6	6
(Bulgaria) Viktoriya Tomova	4	3
WC	(Australia) Destanee Aiava	6^{4}	6	7^{9}
8	(Luxembourg) Mandy Minella	7^{7}	2	6^{7}

Qualifying competition
(United States) Christina McHale	5	1
WC	(Australia) Destanee Aiava	7	6

==== Second qualifier ====
First round
2	(Ukraine) Dayana Yastremska	3	6	6
(United States) Varvara Lepchenko	6	1	4
WC	(Australia) Lizette Cabrera	2	2
(Czech Republic) Karolína Muchová	6	6
(Belgium) Yanina Wickmayer	6	3	2
WC	(Australia) Zoe Hives	4	6	6
(United States) Nicole Gibbs	7	3	2
6	(Russia) Anastasia Potapova	5	6	6

Second round
2	(Ukraine) Dayana Yastremska	2	1^{r}
(Czech Republic) Karolína Muchová	6	5
WC	(Australia) Zoe Hives	3	6	5
6	(Russia) Anastasia Potapova	6	4	7

Qualifying competition
(Czech Republic) Karolína Muchová	6	6^{5}	0
6	(Russia) Anastasia Potapova	1	7^{7}	6

==== Third qualifier ====
First round
3	(Germany) Andrea Petkovic	6	3	6
(Russia) Sofya Zhuk	2	6	2
PR	(Czech Republic) Lucie Hradecká	6	6
(Serbia) Olga Danilović	4	3
(United Kingdom) Harriet Dart	6	6
(United States) Caroline Dolehide	0	2
(United States) Allie Kiick	4	4
7	(Ukraine) Kateryna Kozlova	6	6

Second round
3	(Germany) Andrea Petkovic	6	6
PR	(Czech Republic) Lucie Hradecká	1	1
(United Kingdom) Harriet Dart	2	6	7^{9}
7	(Ukraine) Kateryna Kozlova	6	1	6^{7}

Qualifying competition
3	(Germany) Andrea Petkovic	5	2
(United Kingdom) Harriet Dart	7	6

==== Fourth qualifier ====
First round
4	(United States) Bernarda Pera	4	4
(Poland) Magdalena Fręch	6	6
WC	(Australia) Naiktha Bains	3	0
(Switzerland) Viktorija Golubic	6	6
(Czech Republic) Marie Bouzková	7	6
(Switzerland) Conny Perrin	5	4
(Ukraine) Marta Kostyuk	6^{3}	6	6
5	(United Kingdom) Heather Watson	7^{7}	2	3

Second round
(Poland) Magdalena Fręch	4	4
(Switzerland) Viktorija Golubic	6	6
(Czech Republic) Marie Bouzková	6	6
(Ukraine) Marta Kostyuk	3	1

Qualifying competition
(Switzerland) Viktorija Golubic	6	1	2
(Czech Republic) Marie Bouzková	4	6	6
