= 2019 Mutua Madrid Open =

- Date: 3–12 May
- Edition: 18th
- Draw: 56S / 32D (men); 64S / 28D (women)
- Prize money: €6,536,160 (men) $7,021,128 (women)
- Surface: Clay / outdoor
- Location: Madrid, Spain
- Venue: Park Manzanares

Champions

Men's singles
- (Serbia) Novak Djokovic

Women's singles
- (Netherlands) Kiki Bertens

Men's doubles
- (Netherlands) Jean-Julien Rojer / (Romania) Horia Tecău

Women's doubles
- (Chinese Taipei) Hsieh Su-wei / (Czech Republic) Barbora Strýcová
← 2018 ·	Madrid Open	· 2021 →

The 2019 Madrid Open (sponsored by Mutua) was a professional tennis tournament played on outdoor clay courts at the Park Manzanares in Madrid, Spain from 3–12 May 2019. It was the 18th edition of the event on the ATP Tour and 11th on the WTA Tour. It was classified as an ATP Tour Masters 1000 event on the 2019 ATP Tour and a Premier Mandatory event on the 2019 WTA Tour. This event was the final professional tennis tournament for Spanish player David Ferrer, who received a wildcard into the singles draw.

Ion Țiriac, the event owner, announced in April 2019 that he has extended his sponsorship contract of the Mutua Madrid Open for 10 additional years, until 2031. Because he agreed to continue in Madrid, Țiriac will receive more than 30 million euros from the city of Madrid in the coming years.

== Points and prize money ==
=== Point distribution ===
Event	W	F	SF	QF	Round of 16	Round of 32	Round of 64	Q	Q2	Q1
Men's singles	1000	600	360	180	90	45	10	25	16	0
Men's doubles	1000	600	360	180	90	10	—	—	—	—
Women's singles	1000	650	390	215	120	65	10	30	20	2
Women's doubles	1000	650	390	215	120	10	—	—	—	—

=== Prize money ===
Event	W	F	SF	QF	Round of 16	Round of 32	Round of 64	Q2	Q1
Men's singles	€1,202,520	€608,700	€312,215	€160,920	€80,620	€42,220	€23,790	€9,105	€4,550
Women's singles	€1,202,520	€608,700	€312,215	€160,920	€80,620	€42,220	€19,805	€6,265	€3,250
Men's doubles	€357,540	€174,490	€87,460	€44,560	€23,510	€12,580	—	—	—
Women's doubles	€357,540	€174,490	€87,460	€44,560	€23,510	€13,650	—	—	—

== ATP singles main-draw entrants ==
=== Seeds ===
The following are the seeded players. Seedings are based on ATP rankings as of 29 April 2019. Rankings and points before are as of 6 May 2019.

Seed	Rank	Player	Points before	Points defending	Points won	Points after	Status
1	1	(Serbia) Novak Djokovic	11,160	45	1000	12,115	Champion, defeated (Greece) Stefanos Tsitsipas [8]
2	2	(Spain) Rafael Nadal	7,765	180	360	7,945	Semifinals lost to (Greece) Stefanos Tsitsipas [8]
3	4	(Germany) Alexander Zverev	5,565	1,000	180	4,745	Quarterfinals lost to (Greece) Stefanos Tsitsipas [8]
4	3	(Switzerland) Roger Federer	5,590	0	180	5,770	Quarterfinals lost to (Austria) Dominic Thiem [5]
5	5	(Austria) Dominic Thiem	5,085	600	360	4,845	Semifinals lost to (Serbia) Novak Djokovic [1]
6	7	(Japan) Kei Nishikori	3,780	10	90	3,860	Third round lost to (Switzerland) Stan Wawrinka
7	8	(Argentina) Juan Martín del Potro	3,225	90	10	3,145	Second round lost to (Serbia) Laslo Đere
8	9	(Greece) Stefanos Tsitsipas	3,190	0	600	3,790	Runner-up, lost to (Serbia) Novak Djokovic [1]
9	11	(Croatia) Marin Čilić	2,845	0	180	3,025	Quarterfinals withdrew due to food poisoning
10	12	(Italy) Fabio Fognini	2,840	10	90	2,920	Third round lost to (Austria) Dominic Thiem [5]
11	13	(Russia) Karen Khachanov	2,685	10	45	2,720	Second round lost to (Spain) Fernando Verdasco
12	14	(Russia) Daniil Medvedev	2,625	10	10	2,625	First round lost to (Argentina) Guido Pella
13	15	(Croatia) Borna Ćorić	2,525	90	10	2,445	First round lost to (France) Lucas Pouille
14	17	(Georgia (country)) Nikoloz Basilashvili	1,930	35	10	1,905	First round lost to (United States) Frances Tiafoe
15	18	(France) Gaël Monfils	1,920	45	90	1,965	Third round lost to (Switzerland) Roger Federer [4]
16	19	(Italy) Marco Cecchinato	1,875	(45)^{†}	10	1,840	First round lost to (Argentina) Diego Schwartzman

† The player did not qualify for the tournament in 2018. Accordingly, points for his 18th best result are deducted instead.

The following players would have been seeded, but they withdrew from the event.

Rank	Player	Points before	Points defending	Points after	Reason
6	(South Africa) Kevin Anderson	4,115	360	3,755	Right elbow injury
10	(United States) John Isner	3,085	180	2,950^{‡}	Left foot injury
16	(Canada) Milos Raonic	2,050	90	1,960	Right knee injury

‡ The player is entitled to use an exemption to skip the tournament and substitute his 18th best result (45 points) in its stead.

=== Other entrants ===
The following players received wildcards into the main draw:

- (Canada) Félix Auger-Aliassime
- (Spain) Alejandro Davidovich Fokina
- (Spain) David Ferrer
- (Spain) Jaume Munar

The following player received entry using a protected ranking into the main draw:

- ~~(France) Jo-Wilfried Tsonga~~

The following players received entry from the qualifying draw:

- (Bolivia) Hugo Dellien
- (United States) Taylor Fritz
- (France) Pierre-Hugues Herbert
- (Poland) Hubert Hurkacz
- (Slovakia) Martin Kližan
- (United States) Reilly Opelka
- (Spain) Albert Ramos Viñolas

The following player received entry as a lucky loser:

- (France) Adrian Mannarino

=== Withdrawals ===
Before the tournament

- (South Africa) Kevin Anderson → replaced by (Germany) Jan-Lennard Struff
- (United States) John Isner → replaced by (Italy) Andreas Seppi
- (Canada) Milos Raonic → replaced by (Moldova) Radu Albot
- (France) Jo-Wilfried Tsonga → replaced by (France) Adrian Mannarino

During the tournament

- (Croatia) Marin Čilić

=== Retirements ===
- (United States) Reilly Opelka

== ATP doubles main-draw entrants ==
=== Seeds ===
Country	Player	Country	Player	Rank^{1}	Seed
~~FRA~~	~~Pierre-Hugues Herbert~~	~~FRA~~	~~Nicolas Mahut~~	~~9~~	~~1~~
POL	Łukasz Kubot	BRA	Marcelo Melo	11	2
GBR	Jamie Murray	BRA	Bruno Soares	17	3
COL	Juan Sebastián Cabal	COL	Robert Farah	20	4
CRO	Nikola Mektić	CRO	Franko Škugor	23	5
AUT	Oliver Marach	CRO	Mate Pavić	25	6
USA	Bob Bryan	USA	Mike Bryan	32	7
FIN	Henri Kontinen	AUS	John Peers	35	8

- Rankings are as of April 29, 2019.

=== Other entrants ===
The following pairs received wildcards into the doubles main draw:

- (Spain) Roberto Carballés Baena / (Spain) Jaume Munar
- (Australia) Nick Kyrgios / (Australia) Bernard Tomic
- (Spain) David Marrero / (Spain) Fernando Verdasco

The following pair received entry as alternates:

- (United States) Austin Krajicek / (New Zealand) Artem Sitak

=== Withdrawals ===
Before the tournament

- (France) Nicolas Mahut

During the tournament

- (Brazil) Marcelo Demoliner
- (Bulgaria) Grigor Dimitrov
- (Russia) Daniil Medvedev

=== Retirements ===
- (Spain) Marcel Granollers

== WTA singles main-draw entrants ==
=== Seeds ===
The following are the seeded players. Seedings are based on WTA rankings as of 29 April 2019. Rankings and points before are as of 6 May 2019.

Seed	Rank	Player	Points before	Points defending	Points won	Points after	Status
1	1	(Japan) Naomi Osaka	6,151	10	215	6,356	Quarterfinals lost to (Switzerland) Belinda Bencic
2	2	(Czech Republic) Petra Kvitová	5,835	1,000	215	5,050	Quarterfinals lost to (Netherlands) Kiki Bertens [7]
3	3	(Romania) Simona Halep	5,682	215	650	6,117	Runner-up, lost to (Netherlands) Kiki Bertens [7]
4	4	(Germany) Angelique Kerber	5,220	0	65	5,285	Second round withdrew due to right ankle injury
5	5	(Czech Republic) Karolína Plíšková	5,111	390	65	4,786	Second round lost to (Ukraine) Kateryna Kozlova [Q]
6	6	(Ukraine) Elina Svitolina	4,921	65	10	4,866	First round lost to (France) Pauline Parmentier
7	7	(Netherlands) Kiki Bertens	4,760	650	1000	5,110	Champion, defeated (Romania) Simona Halep [3]
8	8	(United States) Sloane Stephens	4,386	120	390	4,656	Semifinals lost to (Netherlands) Kiki Bertens [7]
9	9	(Australia) Ashleigh Barty	4,275	65	215	4,425	Quarterfinals lost to (Romania) Simona Halep [3]
10	10	(Belarus) Aryna Sabalenka	3,520	30	10	3,500	First round lost to (Russia) Svetlana Kuznetsova [WC]
11	12	(Denmark) Caroline Wozniacki	3,362	120	10	3,252	First round retired against (France) Alizé Cornet
12	13	(Latvia) Anastasija Sevastova	3,185	65	120	3,240	Third round lost to (Netherlands) Kiki Bertens [7]
13	14	(United States) Madison Keys	3,010	10	10	3,010	First round lost to (Romania) Sorana Cîrstea [WC]
14	15	(Estonia) Anett Kontaveit	2,965	120	10	2,855	First round lost to (Belarus) Aliaksandra Sasnovich
15	16	(China) Wang Qiang	2,815	10	10	2,815	First round lost to (Croatia) Donna Vekić
16	17	(Germany) Julia Görges	2,630	120	10	2,520	First round lost to (Slovakia) Viktória Kužmová

The following player would have been seeded, but she withdrew from the event.

Rank	Player	Points before	Points defending	Points after	Reason
11	(United States) Serena Williams	3,461	0	3,461	Conflicts with Met Gala

=== Other entrants ===
The following players received wildcards into the main draw:

- (Spain) Lara Arruabarrena
- (Romania) Irina-Camelia Begu
- (Romania) Sorana Cîrstea
- (Russia) Svetlana Kuznetsova
- (Spain) Sara Sorribes Tormo

The following players received entry from the qualifying draw:

- (Russia) Margarita Gasparyan
- (Slovenia) Polona Hercog
- (Ukraine) Marta Kostyuk
- (Ukraine) Kateryna Kozlova
- (France) Kristina Mladenovic
- (Czech Republic) Kristýna Plíšková
- (Slovakia) Anna Karolína Schmiedlová
- (Russia) Vera Zvonareva

=== Withdrawals ===
Before the tournament

- (Canada) Bianca Andreescu (shoulder injury) → replaced by (France) Pauline Parmentier
- (Italy) Camila Giorgi → replaced by (Belgium) Kirsten Flipkens
- (Russia) Maria Sharapova (shoulder injury) → replaced by (France) Alizé Cornet
- (United States) Serena Williams → replaced by (Croatia) Petra Martić
- (United States) Venus Williams → replaced by (Australia) Daria Gavrilova

During the tournament

- (Germany) Angelique Kerber (right ankle injury)

=== Retirements ===
- (Croatia) Donna Vekić (right hip injury)
- (Denmark) Caroline Wozniacki (low back injury)

== WTA doubles main-draw entrants ==
=== Seeds ===
Country	Player	Country	Player	Rank^{1}	Seed
CZE	Barbora Krejčíková	CZE	Kateřina Siniaková	3	1
USA	Nicole Melichar	CZE	Květa Peschke	25	2
AUS	Samantha Stosur	CHN	Zhang Shuai	28	3
BEL	Elise Mertens	BLR	Aryna Sabalenka	29	4
TPE	Hsieh Su-wei	CZE	Barbora Strýcová	30	5
CAN	Gabriela Dabrowski	CHN	Xu Yifan	30	6
TPE	Chan Hao-ching	TPE	Latisha Chan	32	7
GER	Anna-Lena Grönefeld	NED	Demi Schuurs	36	8

- Rankings are as of April 29, 2019.

=== Other entrants ===
The following pairs received wildcards into the doubles main draw:

- (Spain) Aliona Bolsova / (Spain) Arantxa Parra Santonja
- (Romania) Andreea Mitu / (Russia) Alexandra Panova
- (Latvia) Jeļena Ostapenko / (Russia) Vera Zvonareva

The following pair received entry as alternates:

- (Belarus) Aliaksandra Sasnovich / (Ukraine) Lesia Tsurenko

=== Withdrawals ===
Before the tournament

- (Spain) Lara Arruabarrena (right hip injury)

== Finals ==
=== Men's singles ===
- (Serbia) Novak Djokovic def. (Greece) Stefanos Tsitsipas, 6–3, 6–4

=== Women's singles ===
- (Netherlands) Kiki Bertens def. (Romania) Simona Halep, 6–4, 6–4

=== Men's doubles ===
- (Netherlands) Jean-Julien Rojer / (Romania) Horia Tecău def. (Argentina) Diego Schwartzman / (Austria) Dominic Thiem 6–2, 6–3

=== Women's doubles ===
- (Chinese Taipei) Hsieh Su-wei / (Czech Republic) Barbora Strýcová def. (Canada) Gabriela Dabrowski / (China) Xu Yifan, 6–3, 6–1
