= 2019 BNP Paribas Open – Women's doubles =

Women's doubles
- 2019 BNP Paribas Open

Final
- Champions: (Belgium) Elise Mertens (Belarus) Aryna Sabalenka
- Runners-up: (Czech Republic) Barbora Krejčíková (Czech Republic) Kateřina Siniaková
- Score: 6–3, 6–2

Events
Singles	men	women
Doubles	men	women
- BNP Paribas Open

Elise Mertens and Aryna Sabalenka defeated Barbora Krejčíková and Kateřina Siniaková in the final, 6–3, 6–2 to win the women's doubles tennis title at the 2019 Indian Wells Open.

Hsieh Su-wei and Barbora Strýcová were the defending champions, but they lost in the quarterfinals to Chan Hao-ching and Latisha Chan.

== Seeds ==
1. (Czech Republic) Barbora Krejčíková / (Czech Republic) Kateřina Siniaková (final)
2. (Hungary) Tímea Babos / (France) Kristina Mladenovic (first round)
3. (Chinese Taipei) Hsieh Su-wei / (Czech Republic) Barbora Strýcová (quarterfinals)
4. (United States) Nicole Melichar / (Czech Republic) Květa Peschke (first round)
5. (Canada) Gabriela Dabrowski / (China) Xu Yifan (semifinals)
6. (Australia) Samantha Stosur / (China) Zhang Shuai (first round)
7. (Slovenia) Andreja Klepač / (Spain) María José Martínez Sánchez (first round)
8. (Chinese Taipei) Chan Hao-ching / (Chinese Taipei) Latisha Chan (semifinals)

== Draw ==
Key

- Q = Qualifier
- WC = Wild card
- LL = Lucky loser
- Alt = Alternate
- ITF = ITF entry
- PR = Protected ranking
- SR = Special ranking
- SE = Special exempt
- JE = Junior exempt
- JR = Junior Accelerator Programme entrant
- CO = College Accelerator Programme entrant
- NG = Next Gen Accelerator Program entrant
- w/o = Walkover
- r = Retired
- d = Defaulted

=== Finals ===
Semifinals
1	(Czech Republic) Barbora Krejčíková (Czech Republic) Kateřina Siniaková	5	7^{7}	[10]
8	(Chinese Taipei) Chan Hao-ching (Chinese Taipei) Latisha Chan	7	6^{5}	[6]
5	(Canada) Gabriela Dabrowski (China) Xu Yifan	2	6^{5}
(Belgium) Elise Mertens (Belarus) Aryna Sabalenka	6	7^{7}

Final
1	(Czech Republic) Barbora Krejčíková (Czech Republic) Kateřina Siniaková	3	2
(Belgium) Elise Mertens (Belarus) Aryna Sabalenka	6	6

=== Top half ===
First round
1	(Czech Republic) B Krejčíková (Czech Republic) K Siniaková	6	7
(Australia) A Barty (France) C Garcia	2	5
(Poland) A Rosolska (China) Z Yang	7	4	[10]
WC	(Belarus) V Azarenka (Ukraine) E Svitolina	5	6	[8]
Alt	(Russia) A Pavlyuchenkova (Latvia) A Sevastova	3	4
(United States) J Brady (United States) A Riske	6	6
(Netherlands) K Bertens (Croatia) D Vekić	7^{7}	7
6	(Australia) S Stosur (China) S Zhang	6^{3}	5
3	(Chinese Taipei) S-w Hsieh (Czech Republic) B Strýcová	6	3	[10]
(Germany) J Görges (Czech Republic) Ka Plíšková	4	6	[6]
(Slovenia) D Jakupović (Russia) I Khromacheva	6	6
(Germany) A-L Grönefeld (Czech Republic) L Hradecká	2	4
(Ukraine) L Kichenok (Ukraine) N Kichenok	6	6
(United States) D Krawczyk (United States) S Santamaria	4	1
(Japan) S Aoyama (Belarus) L Marozava	2	3
8	(Chinese Taipei) H-c Chan (Chinese Taipei) L Chan	6	6

Second round
1	(Czech Republic) B Krejčíková (Czech Republic) K Siniaková	7^{7}	4	[10]
(Poland) A Rosolska (China) Z Yang	6^{2}	6	[7]
(United States) J Brady (United States) A Riske	4	0
(Netherlands) K Bertens (Croatia) D Vekić	6	6
3	(Chinese Taipei) S-w Hsieh (Czech Republic) B Strýcová	6	6
(Slovenia) D Jakupović (Russia) I Khromacheva	2	0
(Ukraine) L Kichenok (Ukraine) N Kichenok	3	4
8	(Chinese Taipei) H-c Chan (Chinese Taipei) L Chan	6	6

Quarterfinals
1	(Czech Republic) B Krejčíková (Czech Republic) K Siniaková	6	7^{7}
(Netherlands) K Bertens (Croatia) D Vekić	1	6^{2}
3	(Chinese Taipei) S-w Hsieh (Czech Republic) B Strýcová	6	2	[9]
8	(Chinese Taipei) H-c Chan (Chinese Taipei) L Chan	4	6	[11]

Semifinals
1	(Czech Republic) B Krejčíková (Czech Republic) K Siniaková	5	7^{7}	[10]
8	(Chinese Taipei) H-c Chan (Chinese Taipei) L Chan	7	6^{5}	[6]

=== Bottom half ===
First round
5	(Canada) G Dabrowski (China) Y Xu	7^{7}	7
(Romania) I-C Begu (Romania) M Buzărnescu	6^{3}	5
(Romania) M Niculescu (United States) A Spears	6	6
(Russia) V Kudermetova (Netherlands) D Schuurs	4	4
WC	(Canada) E Bouchard (United States) S Stephens	1	2
(Belgium) K Flipkens (Sweden) J Larsson	6	6
(Croatia) D Jurak (Romania) R Olaru	6	4	[10]
4	(United States) N Melichar (Czech Republic) K Peschke	2	6	[6]
7	(Slovenia) A Klepač (Spain) MJ Martínez Sánchez	4	3
(United States) K Christian (United States) A Muhammad	6	6
(Spain) L Arruabarrena (United Kingdom) H Watson	6^{0}	6	[9]
Alt	(Spain) G Muguruza (Spain) C Suárez Navarro	7^{7}	4	[11]
(Japan) M Kato (Japan) M Ninomiya	3	1
(United States) R Atawo (Slovenia) K Srebotnik	6	6
(Belgium) E Mertens (Belarus) A Sabalenka	6	6^{4}	[10]
2	(Hungary) T Babos (France) K Mladenovic	1	7^{7}	[8]

Second round
5	(Canada) G Dabrowski (China) Y Xu	6	6
(Romania) M Niculescu (United States) A Spears	3	4
(Belgium) K Flipkens (Sweden) J Larsson	6^{5}	3
(Croatia) D Jurak (Romania) R Olaru	7^{7}	6
(United States) K Christian (United States) A Muhammad	w/o
Alt	(Spain) G Muguruza (Spain) C Suárez Navarro
(United States) R Atawo (Slovenia) K Srebotnik	7	3	[9]
(Belgium) E Mertens (Belarus) A Sabalenka	5	6	[11]

Quarterfinals
5	(Canada) G Dabrowski (China) Y Xu	6	6
(Croatia) D Jurak (Romania) R Olaru	3	2
(United States) K Christian (United States) A Muhammad	1	3
(Belgium) E Mertens (Belarus) A Sabalenka	6	6

Semifinals
5	(Canada) G Dabrowski (China) Y Xu	2	6^{5}
(Belgium) E Mertens (Belarus) A Sabalenka	6	7^{7}
