= 2019 Brisbane International =

Tennis tournament

- Date: 30 December 2018 – 6 January 2019
- Edition: 11th
- Category: ATP Tour 250 series / WTA Premier
- Surface: Hard
- Location: Tennyson, Brisbane, Queensland, Australia
- Venue: Queensland Tennis Centre

Champions

Men's singles
- (Japan) Kei Nishikori

Women's singles
- (Czech Republic) Karolína Plíšková

Men's doubles
- (New Zealand) Marcus Daniell / (Netherlands) Wesley Koolhof

Women's doubles
- (United States) Nicole Melichar / (Czech Republic) Květa Peschke
- Brisbane International

The 2019 Brisbane International was a tournament on the 2019 ATP Tour and 2019 WTA Tour. It was played on outdoor hard courts in Brisbane, Queensland, Australia. It was the eleventh edition of the tournament and took place at the Queensland Tennis Centre in Tennyson. It was held from 30 December 2018 to 6 January 2019 as part of the Australian Open Series in preparation for the first Grand Slam of the year.

== Points and prize money ==
=== Point distribution ===
Event	W	F	SF	QF	Round of 16	Round of 32	Q	Q3	Q2	Q1
Men's singles	250	150	90	45	20	0	12	—N/a	6	0
Men's doubles	250	150	90	45	0	—N/a	—N/a	—N/a	—N/a	—N/a
Women's singles	470	305	185	100	55	1	25	18	13	1
Women's doubles	470	305	185	100	1	—N/a	—N/a	—N/a	—N/a	—N/a

=== Prize money ===
Event	W	F	SF	QF	Round of 16	Round of 32^{1}	Q3	Q2	Q1
Men's singles	$90,990	$49,205	$27,175	$15,435	$8,880	$5,320	—N/a	$2,575	$1,285
Men's doubles *	$29,860	$15,300	$8,290	$4,740	$2,780	—N/a	—N/a	—N/a	—N/a
Women's singles	$188,280	$100,580	$53,665	$23,685	$12,705	$6,940	$3,625	$1,925	$1,065
Women's doubles *	$48,330	$25,820	$14,110	$7,180	$3,900	—N/a	—N/a	—N/a	—N/a

_{^{1}Qualifiers prize money is also the Round of 32 prize money.}
_{*per team}

== ATP singles main-draw entrants ==
=== Seeds ===
Country	Player	Rank^{1}	Seed
~~ESP~~	~~Rafael Nadal~~	~~2~~	~~1~~
JPN	Kei Nishikori	9	2
GBR	Kyle Edmund	14	3
RUS	Daniil Medvedev	16	4
CAN	Milos Raonic	18	5
BUL	Grigor Dimitrov	19	6
AUS	Alex de Minaur	31	7
AUS	Nick Kyrgios	35	8

- ^{1} Rankings are as of 24 December 2018.

=== Other entrants ===
The following players received wildcards into the singles main draw:

- (Australia) Alex Bolt
- (Australia) James Duckworth
- (Australia) Alexei Popyrin

The following players received entry into the singles main draw using a protected ranking:

- (United Kingdom) Andy Murray
- (France) Jo-Wilfried Tsonga

The following players received entry from the qualifying draw:

- (France) Ugo Humbert
- (Serbia) Miomir Kecmanović
- (Australia) Thanasi Kokkinakis
- (Japan) Yasutaka Uchiyama

The following player received entry by a lucky loser:

- (Japan) Taro Daniel

=== Withdrawals ===
Before the tournament

- (Spain) Rafael Nadal → replaced by (Japan) Taro Daniel
- (Germany) Mischa Zverev → replaced by (Japan) Yoshihito Nishioka

== ATP doubles main-draw entrants ==
=== Seeds ===
Country	Player	Country	Player	Rank^{1}	Seed
USA	Bob Bryan	USA	Mike Bryan	15	1
JPN	Ben McLachlan	GER	Jan-Lennard Struff	40	2
FIN	Henri Kontinen	AUS	John Peers	49	3
USA	Rajeev Ram	GBR	Joe Salisbury	51	4

- ^{1} Rankings are as of 24 December 2018.

=== Other entrants ===
The following pairs received wildcards into the doubles main draw:

- (Australia) James Duckworth / (Australia) Jordan Thompson
- (Australia) Alex de Minaur / (Australia) Lleyton Hewitt

== WTA singles main-draw entrants ==
=== Seeds ===
Country	Player	Rank^{1}	Seed
UKR	Elina Svitolina	4	1
JPN	Naomi Osaka	5	2
USA	Sloane Stephens	6	3
CZE	Petra Kvitová	7	4
CZE	Karolína Plíšková	8	5
NED	Kiki Bertens	9	6
RUS	Daria Kasatkina	10	7
LAT	Anastasija Sevastova	11	8

- ^{1} Rankings are as of 24 December 2018.

=== Other entrants ===
The following players received wildcards into the singles main draw:

- (Australia) Kimberly Birrell
- (Australia) Priscilla Hon
- (Australia) Samantha Stosur

The following players received entry from the qualifying draw:

- (Australia) Destanee Aiava
- (Czech Republic) Marie Bouzková
- (United Kingdom) Harriet Dart
- (Russia) Anastasia Potapova

=== Withdrawals ===
Before the tournament

- (Italy) Camila Giorgi → replaced by (Australia) Ajla Tomljanović

== WTA doubles main-draw entrants ==
=== Seeds ===
Country	Player	Country	Player	Rank^{1}	Seed
CZE	Barbora Krejčíková	CZE	Kateřina Siniaková	2	1
CAN	Gabriela Dabrowski	CHN	Xu Yifan	22	2
USA	Nicole Melichar	CZE	Květa Peschke	28	3
TPE	Chan Hao-ching	TPE	Latisha Chan	45	4

- ^{1} Rankings are as of 24 December 2018.

=== Other entrants ===
The following pairs received wildcards into the doubles main draw:

- (Australia) Daria Gavrilova / (Czech Republic) Karolína Plíšková
- (Belgium) Elise Mertens / (Australia) Samantha Stosur

The following pairs received entry as alternates:

- (Serbia) Olga Danilović / (Russia) Anastasia Potapova

=== Withdrawals ===
Before the tournament

- (Australia) Daria Gavrilova (right shoulder injury)

== Champions ==
=== Men's singles ===
- (Japan) Kei Nishikori def. (Russia) Daniil Medvedev, 6–4, 3–6, 6–2

=== Women's singles ===
- (Czech Republic) Karolína Plíšková def. (Ukraine) Lesia Tsurenko, 4–6, 7–5, 6–2

=== Men's doubles ===
- (New Zealand) Marcus Daniell / (Netherlands) Wesley Koolhof def. (United States) Rajeev Ram / (United Kingdom) Joe Salisbury, 6–4, 7–6^{(8–6)}

=== Women's doubles ===
- (United States) Nicole Melichar / (Czech Republic) Květa Peschke def. (Chinese Taipei) Chan Hao-ching / (Chinese Taipei) Latisha Chan, 6–1, 6–1
