= 2019 Mutua Madrid Open – Women's doubles =

Women's doubles
- 2019 Mutua Madrid Open

Final
- Champions: (Chinese Taipei) Hsieh Su-wei (Czech Republic) Barbora Strýcová
- Runners-up: (Canada) Gabriela Dabrowski (China) Xu Yifan
- Score: 6–3, 6–1

Events
Singles	men	women
Doubles	men	women
← 2018 ·	Mutua Madrid Open	· 2021 →

Ekaterina Makarova and Elena Vesnina were the defending champions, but chose not to participate this year.

Hsieh Su-wei and Barbora Strýcová won the title, defeating Gabriela Dabrowski and Xu Yifan in the final, 6–3, 6–1.

== Seeds ==
The top four seeds received a bye into the second round.

1. (Czech Republic) Barbora Krejčíková / (Czech Republic) Kateřina Siniaková (quarterfinals)
2. (United States) Nicole Melichar / (Czech Republic) Květa Peschke (second round)
3. (Australia) Samantha Stosur / (China) Zhang Shuai (quarterfinals)
4. (Belgium) Elise Mertens / (Belarus) Aryna Sabalenka (second round)
5. (Chinese Taipei) Hsieh Su-wei / (Czech Republic) Barbora Strýcová (champions)
6. (Canada) Gabriela Dabrowski / (China) Xu Yifan (final)
7. (Chinese Taipei) Chan Hao-ching / (Chinese Taipei) Latisha Chan (first round)
8. (Germany) Anna-Lena Grönefeld / (Netherlands) Demi Schuurs (quarterfinals)

== Draw ==
=== Key ===
- Q = Qualifier
- WC = Wild card
- LL = Lucky loser
- Alt = Alternate
- ITF = ITF entry
- PR = Protected ranking
- SR = Special ranking
- SE = Special exempt
- JE = Junior exempt
- JR = Junior Accelerator Programme entrant
- CO = College Accelerator Programme entrant
- NG = Next Gen Accelerator Program entrant
- w/o = Walkover
- r = Retired
- d = Defaulted

=== Finals ===
Semifinals
6	(Canada) Gabriela Dabrowski (China) Xu Yifan	6	6
WC	(Latvia) Jeļena Ostapenko (Russia) Vera Zvonareva	4	4
5	(Chinese Taipei) Hsieh Su-wei (Czech Republic) Barbora Strýcová	6	4	[10]
(Russia) Veronika Kudermetova (Kazakhstan) Galina Voskoboeva	4	6	[7]

Final
6	(Canada) Gabriela Dabrowski (China) Xu Yifan	3	1
5	(Chinese Taipei) Hsieh Su-wei (Czech Republic) Barbora Strýcová	6	6

=== Top half ===
First round
(Croatia) D Jurak (Romania) R Olaru	2	3
(Romania) I-C Begu (Romania) S Halep	6	6
(Slovenia) A Klepač (Serbia) A Krunić	1	6	[10]
(Japan) S Aoyama (Belarus) L Marozava	6	1	[12]
(Belgium) K Flipkens (United States) A Spears	3	7^{8}	[5]
6	(Canada) G Dabrowski (China) Y Xu	6	6^{6}	[10]
WC	(Spain) A Bolsova (Spain) A Parra Santonja	6	4	[5]
(Romania) I Bara (Romania) M Buzărnescu	3	6	[10]
(Russia) D Kasatkina (Estonia) A Kontaveit	5	6	[4]
Alt	(Belarus) A Sasnovich (Ukraine) L Tsurenko	7	0	[10]
WC	(Latvia) J Ostapenko (Russia) V Zvonareva	7^{7}	7
7	(Chinese Taipei) H-c Chan (Chinese Taipei) L Chan	6^{4}	5

Second round
1	(Czech Republic) B Krejčíková (Czech Republic) K Siniaková	6	6
(Romania) I-C Begu (Romania) S Halep	3	3
(Japan) S Aoyama (Belarus) L Marozava	4	2
6	(Canada) G Dabrowski (China) Y Xu	6	6
4	(Belgium) E Mertens (Belarus) A Sabalenka	6	3	[7]
(Romania) I Bara (Romania) M Buzărnescu	1	6	[10]
Alt	(Belarus) A Sasnovich (Ukraine) L Tsurenko	6	1	[8]
WC	(Latvia) J Ostapenko (Russia) V Zvonareva	1	6	[10]

Quarterfinals
1	(Czech Republic) B Krejčíková (Czech Republic) K Siniaková	6	6^{7}	[7]
6	(Canada) G Dabrowski (China) Y Xu	3	7^{9}	[10]
(Romania) I Bara (Romania) M Buzărnescu	0	3
WC	(Latvia) J Ostapenko (Russia) V Zvonareva	6	6

Semifinals
6	(Canada) G Dabrowski (China) Y Xu	6	6
WC	(Latvia) J Ostapenko (Russia) V Zvonareva	4	4

=== Bottom half ===
First round
5	(Chinese Taipei) S-w Hsieh (Czech Republic) B Strýcová	3	6	[10]
WC	(Romania) A Mitu (Russia) A Panova	6	4	[3]
(United States) D Krawczyk (Japan) M Ninomiya	5	2
(United States) J Brady (Australia) J Moore	7	6
(Spain) MJ Martínez Sánchez (Spain) S Sorribes Tormo	1	6	[10]
(Ukraine) L Kichenok (Ukraine) N Kichenok	6	3	[7]
8	(Germany) A-L Grönefeld (Netherlands) D Schuurs	3	7^{8}	[10]
(Russia) A Pavlyuchenkova (Latvia) A Sevastova	6	6^{6}	[8]
(Belarus) V Azarenka (Australia) A Barty	7^{7}	6
(Poland) A Rosolska (China) Z Yang	6^{2}	1
(United States) R Atawo (Slovenia) K Srebotnik	2	4
(Russia) V Kudermetova (Kazakhstan) G Voskoboeva	6	6

Second round
5	(Chinese Taipei) S-w Hsieh (Czech Republic) B Strýcová	6	7^{7}
(United States) J Brady (Australia) J Moore	3	6^{2}
(Spain) MJ Martínez Sánchez (Spain) S Sorribes Tormo	6	3	[6]
3	(Australia) S Stosur (China) S Zhang	1	6	[10]
8	(Germany) A-L Grönefeld (Netherlands) D Schuurs	6	6
(Belarus) V Azarenka (Australia) A Barty	4	3
(Russia) V Kudermetova (Kazakhstan) G Voskoboeva	6	6
2	(United States) N Melichar (Czech Republic) K Peschke	2	4

Quarterfinals
5	(Chinese Taipei) S-w Hsieh (Czech Republic) B Strýcová	6	6
3	(Australia) S Stosur (China) S Zhang	2	4
8	(Germany) A-L Grönefeld (Netherlands) D Schuurs	4	3
(Russia) V Kudermetova (Kazakhstan) G Voskoboeva	6	6

Semifinals
5	(Chinese Taipei) S-w Hsieh (Czech Republic) B Strýcová	6	4	[10]
(Russia) V Kudermetova (Kazakhstan) G Voskoboeva	4	6	[7]
