= Daria Meshcheriakova =

Ukrainian journalist

- Born: Luhansk, Ukraine
- Education: Kyiv-Mohyla Academy (MA); University of Jena (MA)
- Occupation: Journalist

Daria Meshcheriakova (Note: Also transliterated Darya Meshcheryakova; Russian: Дарья Мещерякова; Ukrainian: Дар'я Мещерякова) is a Ukrainian sports and political journalist. Born in Luhansk in eastern Ukraine, she was educated at the Kyiv-Mohyla Academy and the University of Jena. She lived in Kyiv, working for Segodnya and other outlets, before the Russian invasion in 2022. She continued to work after she took refuge in Kosovo. At the 2023 French Open, she engaged tennis player Aryna Sabalenka in a pair of exchanges about the invasion, leading the player to skip her next couple of press conferences.

== Early life and education ==
Meshcheriakova was born in the city of Luhansk in the Donbas, eastern Ukraine, to a Russian father from Rostov-on-Don and a Ukrainian mother. She spent much of her childhood with her grandmother in Millerovo, Russia, but would eventually cut off that side of the family when ethnic tensions escalated. She went to the National University of Kyiv-Mohyla Academy in the Ukrainian capital beginning in 2006. She later studied political science and the Yugoslav Wars at the University of Jena in Germany.

== Career ==
=== Early career, Kyiv to Kosovo ===
Meshcheriakova wrote for the newspaper Segodnya in Kyiv before moving to Berlin to work for Der Tagesspiegel. When war broke out in the Donbas in 2014, she came home to visit Luhansk, which was soon heavily shelled by pro-Russian forces, before returning to Kyiv and Segodnya. After participating in a program for Eastern European journalists with the public broadcaster Deutsche Welle in Germany, she "immersed herself in journalism" in Kyiv, including helping launch a sports news startup which shuttered after three months in 2018.

Before the full-scale invasion by Russia in early 2022, Meshcheriakova remained in Kyiv, doing freelance sports journalism and working for the German embassy. Ten days into the invasion, Meshcheriakova fled to relatives in Maastricht, the Netherlands, distressed by shelling near her apartment building. Her parents remained in Russian-occupied Luhansk after briefly staying with family across the Russian border. After two months in the Netherlands, she moved to Pristina, Kosovo, in May 2022, receiving a salary and housing from the Kosovo–sponsored Journalists in Residence program of the European Centre for Press and Media Freedom (ECPMF). There, resuming her journalism work, she wrote and gave many interviews about the war for Kosovo media and covered sports for the Ukrainian website Tribuna. She returned to Kyiv for the first time since the invasion in February 2023.

=== Tennis and the war ===
In May 2023, while living near Paris, Meshcheriakova decided to go to the 2023 French Open as an independent journalist to question Russian and Belarusian tennis players about their attitudes toward the war. She twice confronted world No. 2 tennis player Aryna Sabalenka of Belarus in the press room; Sabalenka had met multiple times with Belarusian president Alexander Lukashenko, an ally of Russia, and reportedly signed a letter endorsing him after a series of anti-government protests in 2020. At a first-round press conference on 28 May, when asked by Meshcheriakova what she had to say "to the world" about the war, Sabalenka offered her most direct words on the subject to date, including: "How can we support the war? Nobody, normal people will never support it". Meshcheriakova followed up at Sabalenka's second-round press conference on 31 May, asking about her reported association with Lukashenko; when Sabalenka refused to comment, Meshcheriakova said, "So you basically support everything because you cannot speak up? You're not a small person, Aryna", before the moderator cut in to change the subject.

Sabalenka did not attend her next mandatory press conferences on 2 and 4 June, saying she "did not feel safe" facing politics-related questions; instead a transcript was released of an interview she did with a Women's Tennis Association (WTA) employee behind closed doors. Meshcheriakova did not have her press credentials revoked but also did not encounter Sabalenka again, having planned 3 June to be her last day at the tournament. On 6 June, when Sabalenka returned to the press room and a Politico Europe journalist asked her directly about her president, she said, "It's a tough question ... I don't support war, meaning I don't support Lukashenko right now".

Meshcheriakova has also interviewed other Russian or Belarusian tennis players about the war, such as Anastasia Pavlyuchenkova and Karen Khachanov.
