= Aryna Sabalenka =

Belarusian tennis player (born 1998)

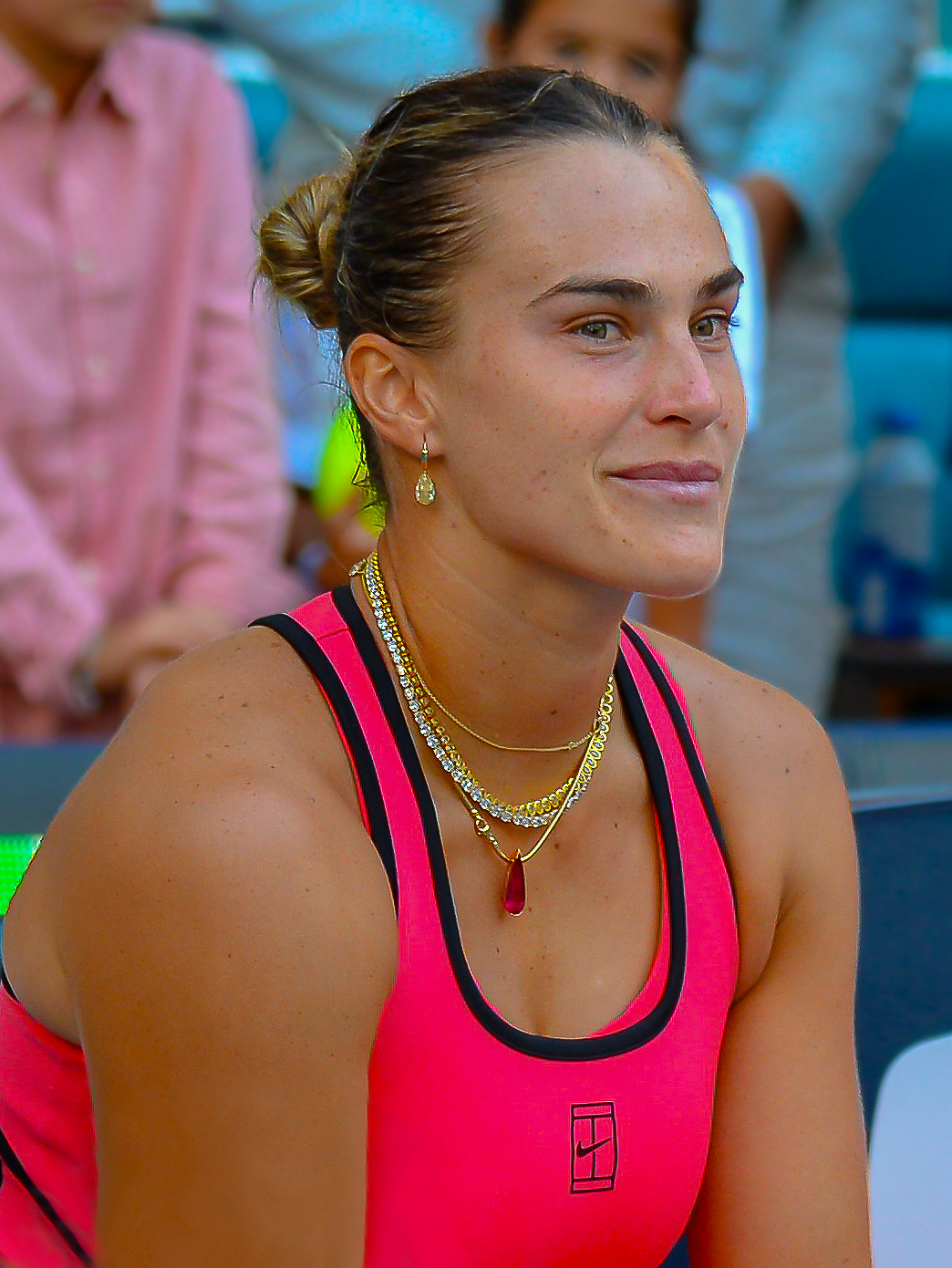
- Sabalenka in 2026
- Full name: Aryna Sabalenka
- Native name: Арына Сяргееўна; Сабаленка
- Country (sports): Belarus
- Residence: Miami, Florida, US
- Born: 5 May 1998 (age 28) Minsk, Belarus
- Height: 1.82 m (6 ft 0 in)
- Turned pro: 2015
- Plays: Right-handed (two-handed backhand)
- Coach: Anton Dubrov
- Prize money: US$53,284,864: 2nd all-time in earnings
- Official website: arynasabalenka.komi.io

Singles
- Career record: 506–203
- Career titles: 24
- Highest ranking: No. 1 (11 September 2023)
- Current ranking: No. 3 (16 November 2026)

Grand Slam singles results
- Australian Open: W (2023, 2024)
- French Open: F (2025)
- Wimbledon: SF (2021, 2023, 2025)
- US Open: W (2024, 2025)

Other tournaments
- Tour Finals: F (2022, 2025)
- Olympic Games: 2R (2021)

Doubles
- Career record: 90–67
- Career titles: 6
- Highest ranking: No. 1 (22 February 2021)

Grand Slam doubles results
- Australian Open: W (2021)
- French Open: SF (2019)
- Wimbledon: QF (2019)
- US Open: W (2019)

Other doubles tournaments
- Tour Finals: RR (2019)

Grand Slam mixed doubles results
- Wimbledon: 2R (2019)
- US Open: 1R (2026)

Team competitions
- Fed Cup: F (2017)
- Last updated on: 13 September 2026.

Aryna Siarhiejeŭna Sabalenka (Note: Belarusian: Арына Сяргееўна Сабаленка, romanized: Aryna Siarhiejeŭna Sabalienka, IPA: [aˈrɨna sʲarˈɣʲɛjɛwna sabaˈlʲɛnka]; Russian: Арина Сергеевна Соболенко, romanized: Arina Sergeyevna Sobolenko.) (born 5 May 1998) is a Belarusian professional tennis player. She has been ranked world No. 1 in women's singles by the Women's Tennis Association (WTA) for 107 weeks, and finished as the year-end No. 1 in 2024 and 2025. Sabalenka has won 24 career singles titles, including four majors (two titles at the Australian Open and two at the US Open), as well as eleven WTA 1000 events. She is also a former world No. 1 in women's doubles and has won six doubles titles, including the 2019 US Open and 2021 Australian Open, both with Elise Mertens.

Sabalenka came to prominence in 2017 when she and Aliaksandra Sasnovich led the Belarus Fed Cup team to a runner-up finish despite both being ranked outside the top 75 at the time. She finished 2018 and 2019 ranked world No. 11 in singles. Following two major singles semifinal appearances in 2021, Sabalenka rose to world No. 2 but struggled to maintain that success in 2022 consistently. In 2023, she won her first major singles title at the Australian Open, finished runner-up at the US Open, and obtained the world No. 1 ranking for the first time.

In 2024, Sabalenka defended her Australian Open title and won a third major singles title at the US Open, finishing as the year-end No. 1 for the first time. In 2025, she defended her title at the US Open and was runner-up at the Australian and French Opens, holding the No. 1 position for the entire season. In 2026, she reached two major singles finals (Australian Open and US Open) and completed the Sunshine Double (winning Indian Wells and Miami back-to-back). Also in 2026, Sabalenka won the Laureus World Sports Award for Sportswoman of the Year.

Sabalenka began playing doubles regularly in 2019. With Mertens as her partner, she found instant success by winning the Sunshine Double (Indian Wells and Miami) that same year. They won the US Open later in the season, and Sabalenka qualified for the WTA Finals for the first time. After she and Mertens won their second major title at the Australian Open in 2021, Sabalenka became the doubles world No. 1, after which she shifted to playing exclusively singles.

== Early life and background ==
Sabalenka was born in Minsk, the capital of Belarus. Her father, Sergey (died 2019), was an ice hockey player. Sabalenka started playing tennis by chance. She said, "One day, my dad was just driving me somewhere in the car, and he saw tennis courts on the way. So he took me to the courts. I liked it and enjoyed it, and that's how it was. That's how it started." She began training at the National Tennis Academy in Minsk when it opened in 2014. In 2015, the Belarusian Tennis Federation persuaded Sabalenka and her team to focus on playing low-level professional events instead of junior tournaments, even though she was still eligible to compete at the junior level.

== Career ==
=== Juniors ===
Sabalenka had a late start on the ITF Junior Circuit, instead competing on the U14 and U16 Tennis Europe tours at a younger age. She did not compete in the main draw of any ITF events until 2013 at the low-level Grade-4 Tallink Cup in Estonia at the age of 15. She never played in the junior Grand Slam tournaments or any other high-level Grade-A and Grade-1 events. Without the higher point levels from these bigger tournaments, she had a career-high ranking of just No. 225. (Note: To obtain data from this reference, select the corresponding year on the WTA or ITF website.) Sabalenka won her first ITF title in doubles at the lowest-level Grade-5 Alatan Tour Cup in Belarus in late 2013 with compatriot Vera Lapko as her partner. In 2014, she excelled at Grade 4 events. She reached her first singles final at the Estonian Junior Open in June and won her first singles title at the MTV Total Junior Cup in Finland in October. At the end of the season, Sabalenka defended her Alatan Tour Cup doubles title, this time with compatriot Nika Shytkouskaya, and also won the singles title. She only played in one tournament in 2015, the European Junior Championships. As a Grade B1 event, this was the highest-level junior tournament she played in. She lost in the second round to top seed Markéta Vondroušová.

=== 2012–2016: Professional & Fed Cup debut ===
Sabalenka began playing on the ITF Women's Circuit in 2012, even before she competed on the ITF Junior Circuit. Her first five tournaments were in her hometown of Minsk and spread out over two years, but she did not win a main draw match in any of them. She won her first professional match at the very end of 2014 in Istanbul. The following season in October, she won her first two titles in back-to-back weeks in Antalya, both at the $10k level. Sabalenka also won a $25k title the last week of the year. This title put her into the top 300 WTA rankings for the first time at the start of 2016. That year, she made her Fed Cup debut in April, losing her only match. She also won her two biggest titles to date at the $50k level. The first in Tianjin put her into the top 200 in May and the second in Toyota in November helped her finish the year ranked at No. 137 in the world.

=== 2017: WTA 125 title, top 100 ===
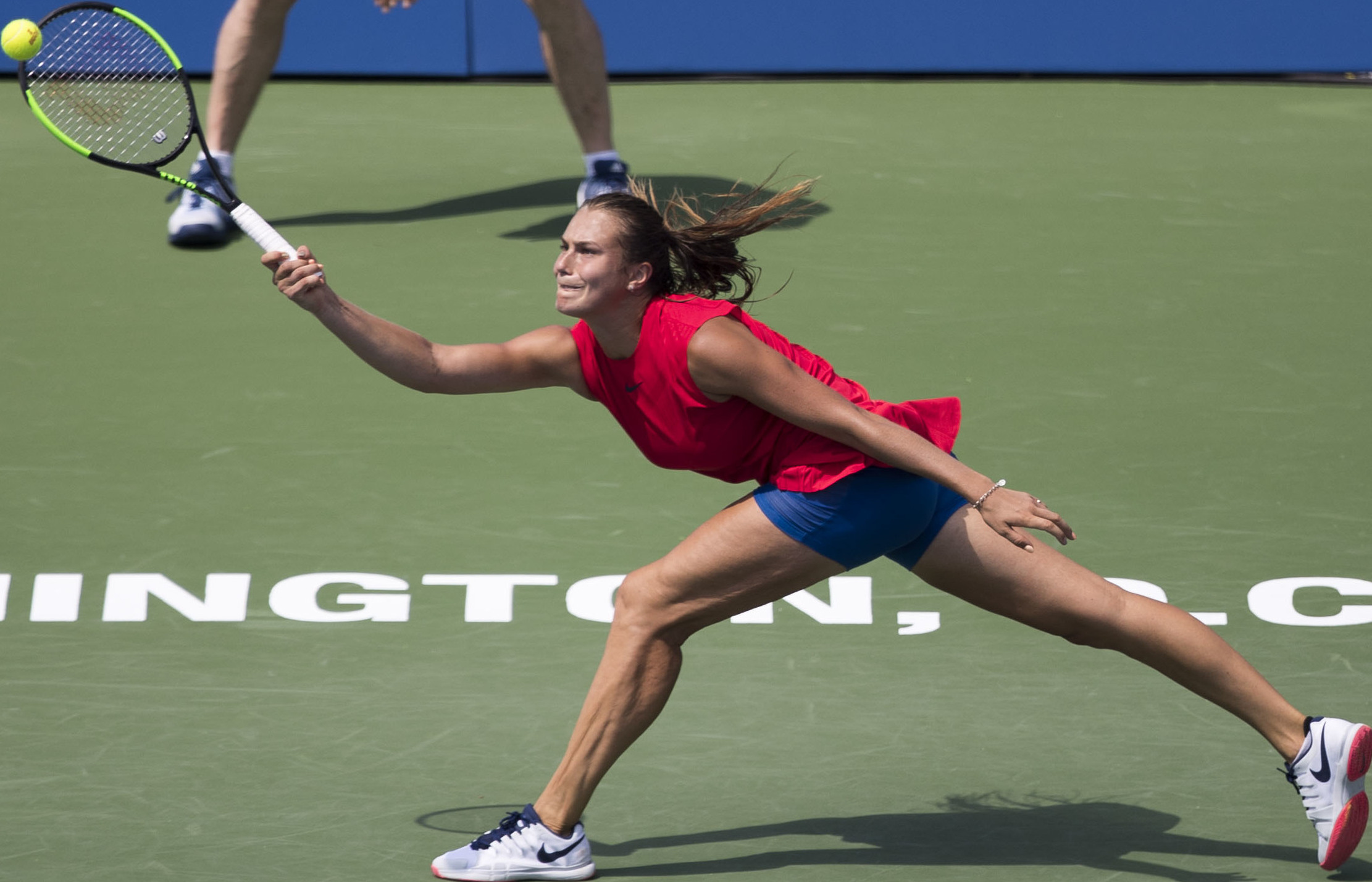
Sabalenka at the 2017 Washington Open

Despite some early season success in the Fed Cup, Sabalenka had a quiet start to the year. She played in her first WTA Tour main draw in February as a qualifier at the Dubai Open; however, she did not win her first WTA Tour match until Wimbledon in July. In her Grand Slam debut, she again reached the main draw through qualifying and defeated Irina Khromacheva in the opening round. Sabalenka followed up this achievement with another win at the Washington Open over No. 34 Lauren Davis, the 2016 runner-up and the highest-ranked player she had defeated at the time.

After losing in qualifying at the US Open, Sabalenka reached her first ever WTA semifinal at the Tashkent Open, defeating third seed and world No. 53, Tatjana Maria, along the way. A few weeks later, she entered the Tianjin Open as the 119th-ranked player in the world, but managed to reach her first WTA tournament final. There, she faced her childhood idol Maria Sharapova, but ultimately lost in two tight sets. With this performance, she rose to No. 76 in the rankings, entering the top 100 for the first time. After losing a tight Fed Cup final to the United States, Sabalenka finished the season by winning the biggest title of her career at the time at the Mumbai Open, a WTA 125 event. The title cemented her at No. 78 at the end of the year.

=== 2018: Premier 5 title, top 20 ===
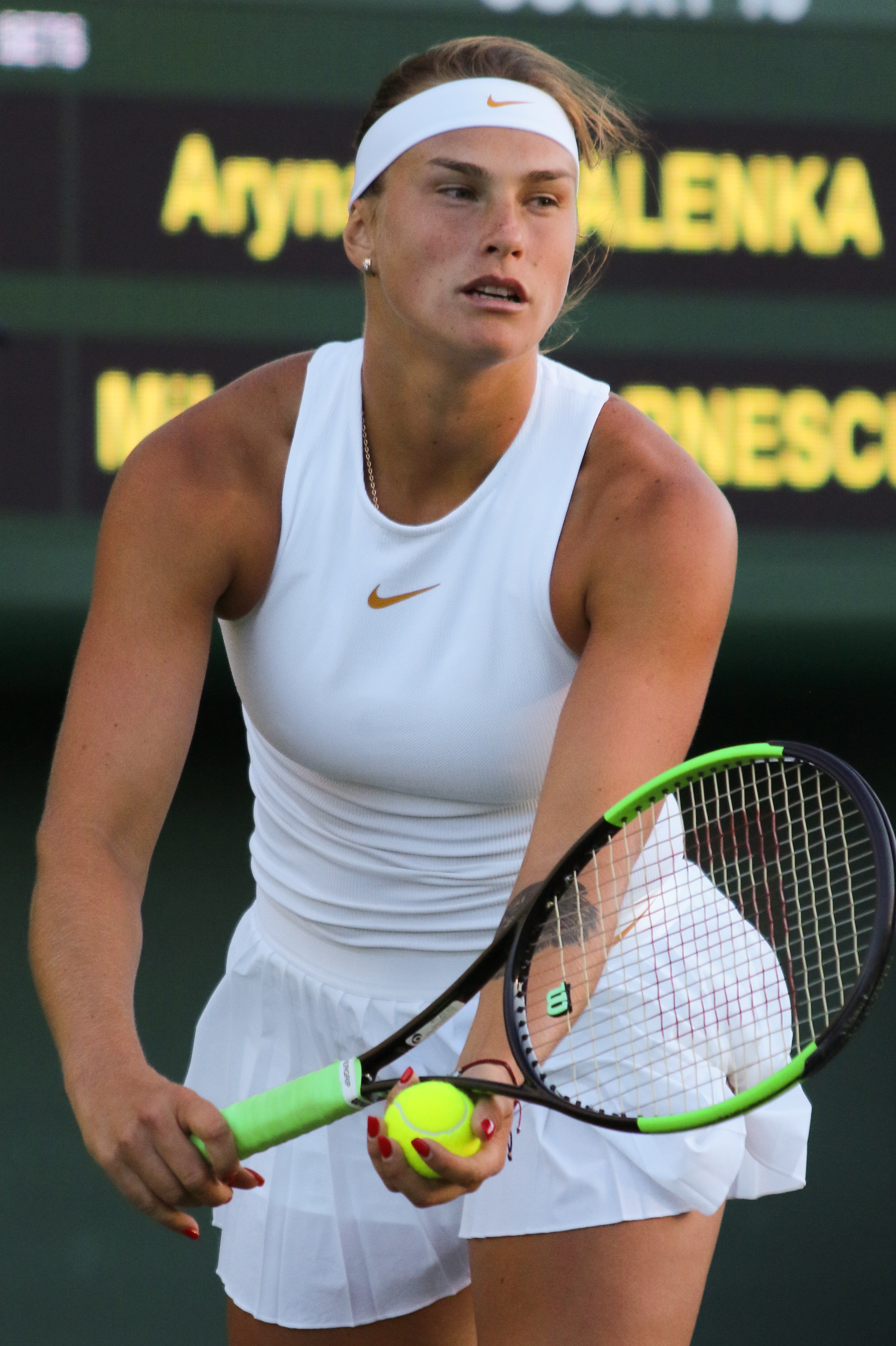
Sabalenka at the 2018 Wimbledon Championships

After playing relatively few WTA events in 2017, Sabalenka used her higher ranking to play exclusively on the WTA Tour 2018. She reached two quarterfinals to begin the year. At the Shenzhen Open, she defeated Monica Niculescu and qualifier Danka Kovinić to reach the quarterfinals, where she lost to world No. 1 Simona Halep in straight sets. At the Hobart International, she defeated wildcard entrant Eugenie Bouchard and Zhang Shuai to reach the quarterfinals, where she lost to Lesia Tsurenko in straight sets. At the Australian Open, however, she lost her opening-round match to No. 17 Ashleigh Barty. At the Indian Wells Open, she defeated Varvara Lepchenko and No. 18 Svetlana Kuznetsova before losing to Markéta Vondroušová.

Sabalenka began the clay-court season at the Ladies Open Lugano. She defeated Mihaela Buzărnescu, Polona Hercog, Camila Giorgi, and wildcard entrant Stefanie Vögele to reach her second career final, where she lost to No. 20 Elise Mertens in straight sets. As a result, her ranking rose to the top 50. At the French Open, however, she lost in the first round to No. 22 Kiki Bertens.

Sabalenka had stronger results on grass. At the Libéma Open, she defeated Markéta Vondroušová and Ajla Tomljanović to make it to the quarterfinals, where she lost to Kirsten Flipkens in straight sets. At the Eastbourne International, Sabalenka defeated No. 13 Julia Görges and No. 15 Elise Mertens to reach the quarterfinals. In the quarterfinals, she upset No. 7 and defending champion Karolína Plíšková for her first victory over a top 10 player. She defeated Agnieszka Radwańska to reach her first WTA Premier final, where she lost to world No. 2 Caroline Wozniacki in straight sets. As a result, her ranking climbed to No. 32. At Wimbledon, however, she lost in the first round to No. 28 Mihaela Buzărnescu.

During the North American hardcourt summer season, Sabalenka rose through the rankings. At the Canadian Open, she stunned world No. 2 Caroline Wozniacki for the biggest win of her career, but lost in the third round to No. 15 Elise Mertens. At the Cincinnati Open, Sabalenka recorded two more top-ten wins over No. 8 Karolína Plíšková and No. 5 Caroline Garcia to reach her first Premier 5 quarterfinal. She stunned No. 13 Madison Keys to reach her first Premier 5 semifinal, where she lost to world No. 1 Simona Halep in straight sets. At the Connecticut Open, Sabalenka defeated lucky loser Samantha Stosur, No. 24 Daria Saville, lucky loser Belinda Bencic, and No. 9 Julia Görges to reach the final. In the final, she defeated Carla Suárez Navarro in straight sets to claim her first Premier-tier title and jump into the top 20. Sabalenka closed out this part of the season with her best result at a Grand Slam tournament to date. At the US Open, she defeated Danielle Collins, qualifier Vera Zvonareva, and No. 5 Petra Kvitová to make it to the fourth round, where she lost to No. 19 and eventual champion Naomi Osaka in three sets. She was the only player to win a set against Osaka in the tournament.

At the Wuhan Open, Sabalenka defeated Carla Suárez Navarro in the first round. In the second round, she upset No. 6 Elina Svitolina. She defeated qualifier Sofia Kenin and Dominika Cibulková to reach her second Premier 5 semifinal. She defeated No. 17 Ashleigh Barty to reach her first Premier 5 final. In the final, she defeated Anett Kontaveit in straight sets to win her first Premier 5 title. At the China Open, Sabalenka defeated No. 15 Garbiñe Muguruza and No. 4 Caroline Garcia to reach the quarterfinals, where she lost to wildcard entrant Wang Qiang in straight sets. The success in China helped her reach a new career-high singles ranking of No. 11. At the end of the season, Sabalenka qualified for the WTA Elite Trophy. She defeated Ashleigh Barty but lost to Caroline Garcia in the group stage. Barty, having defeated Garcia with fewer games lost, advanced out of the group to end Sabalenka's season. Sabalenka was named the WTA Newcomer of the Year.

=== 2019: Premier 5 title, singles top 10, doubles No. 2 ===
==== Singles: Elite Trophy, three titles ====
Sabalenka began the season at the Shenzhen Open. She defeated Tatjana Maria and Ekaterina Alexandrova to reach the quarterfinals. She reached the semifinals as No. 29 Maria Sharapova retired. She defeated Wang Yafan to reach the final. In the final, she came from a set down to defeated Alison Riske and win the title. However, she could not build on this success in the rest of the first half of the year. At the Australian Open, she defeated qualifier Anna Kalinskaya and Katie Boulter before losing to Amanda Anisimova. Nonetheless, she made her top-10 debut following the event. At the St. Petersburg Ladies Trophy, Sabalenka defeated Alison Van Uytvanck and qualifier Ekaterina Alexandrova to reach the semifinals, where she lost to No. 8 Kiki Bertens in straight sets. At the Dubai Championships, she defeated qualifier Ivana Jorović before losing to Belinda Bencic. At the Indian Wells, she defeated Ajla Tomljanović and No. 28 Lesia Tsurenko before losing to No. 8 Angelique Kerber. Following early exits in Miami, Madrid, and Rome, Sabalenka reached the semifinals at the Internationaux de Strasbourg, where she lost to Dayana Yastremska in straight sets. At the French Open, she lost to Amanda Anisimova again in the second round. At the Eastbourne International, Sabalenka defeated No. 14 and defending champion Caroline Wozniacki to reach the quarterfinals, where she lost to No. 4 Kiki Bertens in three sets. At Wimbledon, she lost in the first round to Magdaléna Rybáriková.

Sabalenka had a better second half of the season. At the Silicon Valley Classic, she defeated wildcard entrant CoCo Vandeweghe, No. 29 Carla Suárez Navarro, and No. 25 Donna Vekić to reach the final, where she lost to Zheng Saisai in straight sets. At the Canadian Open, she lost in the first round to Anastasia Pavlyuchenkova. At the Cincinnati Open, she defeated Petra Martić and Zheng Saisai before losing to Maria Sakkari. At the US Open, she defeated Victoria Azarenka before losing to Yulia Putintseva. She returned to China following the US Open, and produced stronger results. At the Zhengzhou Open, Sabalenka defeated Jeļena Ostapenko to reach the quarterfinals, where she lost to No. 23 Petra Martić in three sets. At the Wuhan Open, Sabalenka defeated Aliaksandra Sasnovich, Danielle Collins, and No. 8 Kiki Bertens to reach the quarterfinals, without dropping a set. She defeated wildcard entrant Elena Rybakina in three sets to reach the semifinals. She upset world No. 1 Ashleigh Barty in straight sets to reach her second straight Wuhan Open final. In the final, she defeated Alison Riske in three sets to defend her title. At the end of the season, Sabalenka qualified for the WTA Elite Trophy for the second consecutive year. In her round-robin group, she swept Maria Sakkari and Elise Mertens. In the semifinals, she defeated Karolína Muchová. In the final, she defeated Kiki Bertens in straight sets to take her third title of the year in China. She finished the year for a ranking of world No. 11, the same as she ended 2018.

==== Doubles: US Open title, Sunshine Double ====
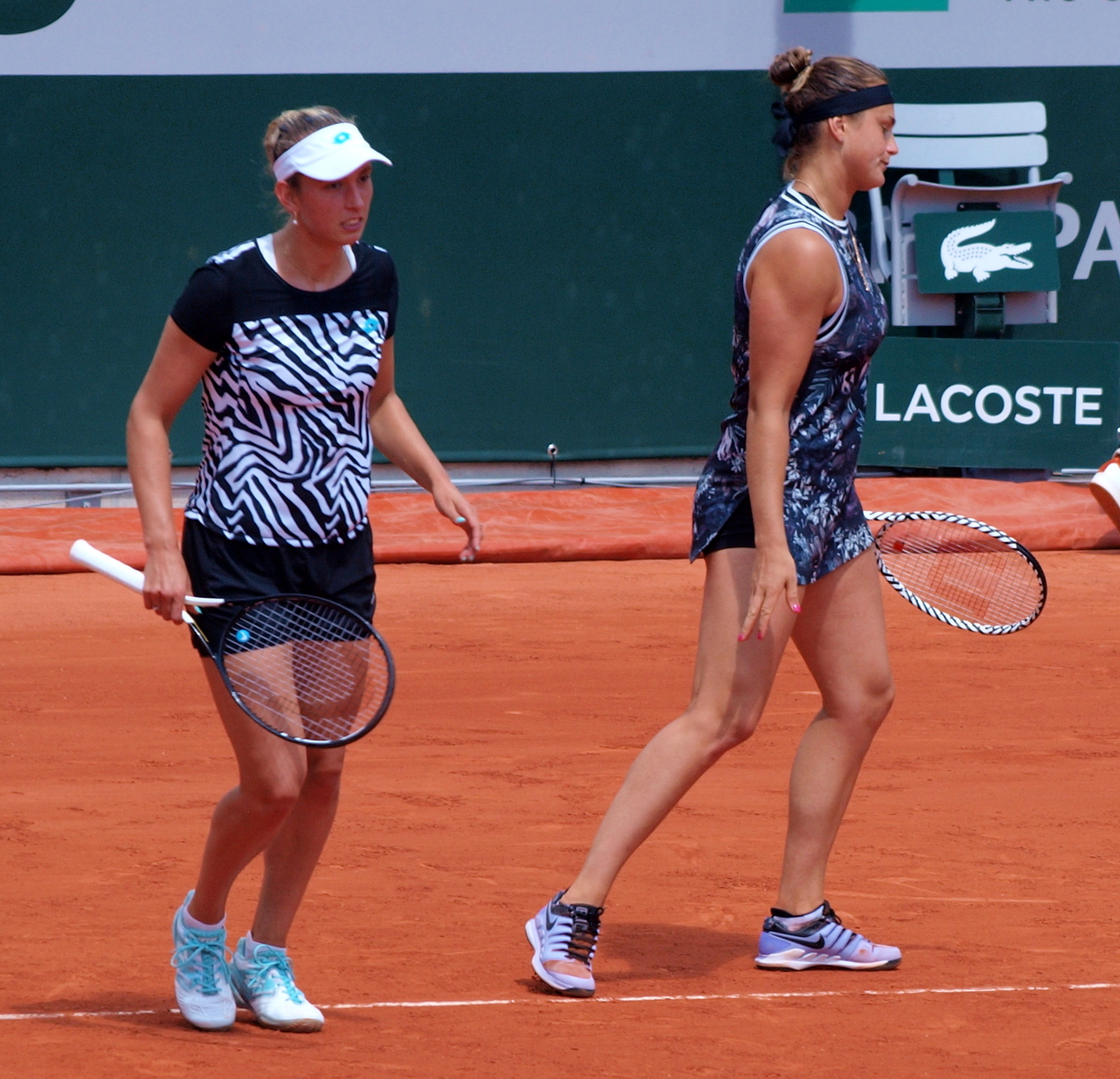
Mertens and Sabalenka at the 2019 French Open

Sabalenka started the year ranked No. 73 in doubles. She began partnering with Elise Mertens in January, when the pair lost to top seeds Barbora Krejčíková and Kateřina Siniaková in the third round of the Australian Open. They had their breakthrough in March at the two Premier Mandatory tournaments. In only their second tournament together, Sabalenka and Mertens won the Indian Wells Open. They defeated three of the top five seeds in the event, including second seeds Tímea Babos and Kristina Mladenovic in the first round and top seeds Krejčíková and Siniaková in the final. The pair matched this success at their next event by winning the Miami Open to complete the Sunshine Double. They defeated three of the top six seeds, including third seeds Hsieh Su-wei and Barbora Strýcová in the second round. They won the final against sixth seeds Samantha Stosur and Zhang Shuai. With these two titles, Sabalenka rose to No. 21 in the world.

Sabalenka and Mertens continued to partner together throughout the year, entering eleven events before the year-end championships. Sabalenka did not have much success in the Grand Slam singles events, but she produced much better results in doubles. Sabalenka and Mertens reached the semifinals at the French Open, losing to second seeds Babos and Mladenovic. They then reached the quarterfinals at Wimbledon, losing to third seeds Hsieh and Strýcová. These were Sabalenka's first two appearances in at least the quarterfinals at a Grand Slam event. Sabalenka and Mertens had their best result of the year at the US Open. As the fourth seed at the event, they made it to the final without playing another top-ten-seeded team. In the final, they faced eighth seeds Victoria Azarenka and Ashleigh Barty, the latter of whom had won the title a year earlier with CoCo Vandeweghe. Sabalenka and Mertens defeated Azarenka and Barty in straight sets for their first Grand Slam title in any discipline. With this title, Sabalenka made her top 10 debut in doubles at No. 6 in the world.

Sabalenka and Mertens made one more final during the year, finishing runner-up at the Wuhan Open, where Sabalenka won the singles title. Their three big titles helped them win the Race to Shenzhen and qualify for the WTA Finals as the top seeds. Before the event, Sabalenka and Mertens moved up to No. 2 and No. 3 in the rankings, respectively, behind only world No. 1, Barbora Strýcová. At the WTA Finals, the pair were placed in a round robin group with third seeds Babos and Mladenovic, fifth seeds Chan Hao-ching and Latisha Chan, as well as eighth seeds Anna-Lena Grönefeld and Demi Schuurs. In their opening match, they were upset by Grönefeld and Schuurs in a match tiebreak. After defeating the Chan sisters, Sabalenka and Mertens lost to Babos and Mladenovic in another match tiebreak. They did not advance out of their group.

=== 2020: Premier 5 title ===
Sabalenka started the season at the Shenzhen Open. She defeated qualifier Margarita Gasparyan before losing to Kristýna Plíšková. At the Adelaide International, Sabalenka upset No. 4 Simona Halep to reach the semifinals, where she lost to Dayana Yastremska in straight sets. At the Australian Open, she lost in the first round to Carla Suárez Navarro. She enjoyed moderate success in doubles, reaching the quarterfinals with Elise Mertens before losing to the Chan sisters. At the Dubai Championships, Sabalenka defeated Maria Sakkari and Elise Mertens to reach the quarterfinals, where she lost to No. 2 Simona Halep in three sets. At the Qatar Open, Sabalenka defeated Anett Kontaveit, No. 20 Maria Sakkari, Zheng Saisai and Svetlana Kuznetsova to reach the final. In the final, she defeated No. 11 Petra Kvitová in straight sets to win her third Premier 5 title.

After the COVID-19 pandemic shut down the WTA Tour, Sabalenka entered the Top Seed Open in August. She defeated Madison Brengle before falling to Coco Gauff. In Cincinnati, she defeated qualifier CiCi Bellis before losing to qualifier Jessica Pegula. At the US Open, she defeated Océane Dodin before losing to Victoria Azarenka. She had moderate success in doubles, reaching the quarterfinals of both events. Her results began to improve on clay. At the Internationaux de Strasbourg, Sabalenka defeated qualifier Ellen Perez, Anna Blinkova, and Kateřina Siniaková to reach the semifinals, where she lost to No. 5 Elina Svitolina in three sets. At the French Open, she defeated Jessica Pegula and Daria Kasatkina before losing to Ons Jabeur.

Sabalenka entered two indoor hard-court events at the end of 2020. At the Ostrava Open, she came from a set down to defeat qualifiers Coco Gauff and Sara Sorribes Tormo. She defeated Jennifer Brady and No. 14 Victoria Azarenka in straight sets to win her second title of the season. At the same tournament, she also won the doubles event with Elise Mertens, defeating Gabriela Dabrowski and Luisa Stefani in the final. At the Linz Open, Sabalenka defeated Jasmine Paolini and qualifiers Stefanie Vögele and Océane Dodin to reach the semifinals. She defeated Barbora Krejčíková to reach the final. In the final, she defeated No. 21 Elise Mertens in straight sets to capture her third title of the season. For the first time, she finished the year at the top 10.

=== 2021: Major semifinals, singles No. 2, doubles No. 1 ===
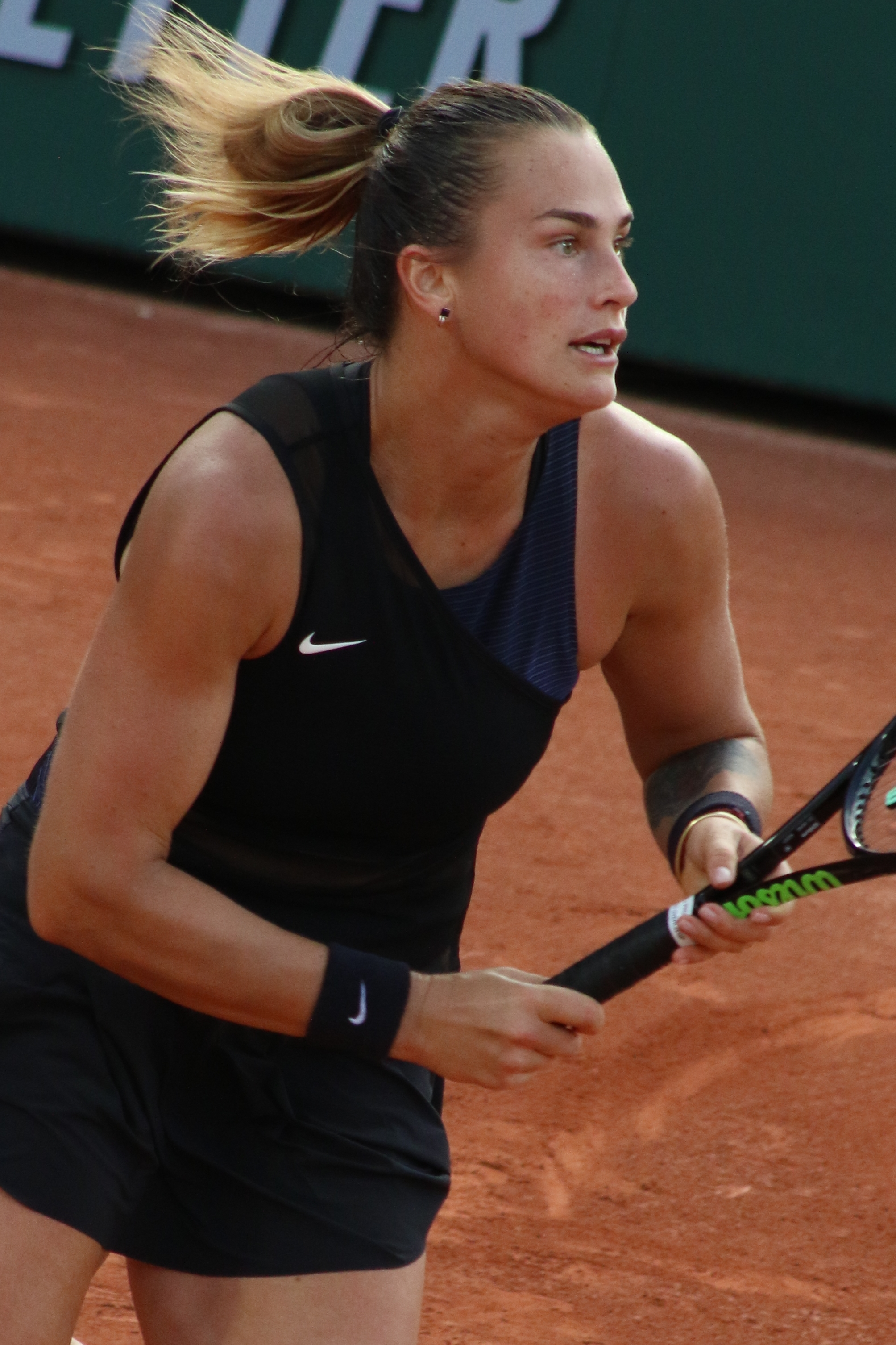
Sabalenka at the 2021 French Open

Sabalenka entered her first tournament in 2021 at the Abu Dhabi Open. She defeated Polona Hercog, Ajla Tomljanović, and Ons Jabeur, without dropping a set, to reach the quarterfinals. She defeated No. 19 Elena Rybakina in three sets to reach the semifinals. She defeated No. 22 Maria Sakkari and Veronika Kudermetova in straight sets to win her third straight WTA title, extending her winning streak to 15 matches and catapulting her to a new ranking of No. 7.

At the Australian Open, Sabalenka defeated Viktória Hrunčáková, Daria Kasatkina, and Ann Li to reach the fourth round, where she lost to No. 11 Serena Williams in three sets. Nonetheless, at the same tournament, Sabalenka won her second major doubles title with Elise Mertens, defeating Barbora Krejčíková and Kateřina Siniaková in the final. By winning the title, she ascended to world No. 1 in the doubles rankings for the first time in her career.

As the defending champion at the Qatar Open, Sabalenka lost her opening match to Garbiñe Muguruza. At the Dubai Championships, Sabalenka defeated Alizé Cornet and No. 24 Anett Kontaveit to reach the quarterfinals, where she lost again to No. 16 Garbiñe Muguruza in three sets.

At the Miami Open, Sabalenka came from a set down to defeat qualifier Tsvetana Pironkova in her opening match. She defeated Veronika Kudermetova and No. 20 Markéta Vondroušová in straight sets to reach the quarterfinals. In the quarterfinals, she lost to world No. 1 Ashleigh Barty in three sets.

Sabalenka started her clay season at the Stuttgart Open. She defeated Zhang Shuai and qualifier Anna-Lena Friedsam, without dropping a set, to reach the quarterfinals. She defeated Anett Kontaveit in three sets to reach the semifinals. She upset No. 3 Simona Halep in straight sets to reach the final. In the final, she lost again to world No. 1 Ashleigh Barty in three sets.

At the Madrid Open, Sabalenka defeated qualifier Vera Zvonareva, Daria Kasatkina, and Jessica Pegula, without dropping a set, to reach the quarterfinals. She reached the semifinals as No. 16 Elise Mertens retired while trailing by a set. She defeated Anastasia Pavlyuchenkova in straight sets to reach her second consecutive final on clay. In the final, she upset world No. 1 Ashleigh Barty in three sets to win her tenth WTA title and first on clay. As a result, her ranking moved to world No. 4.

At the Italian Open, Sabalenka defeated Sara Sorribes Tormo before losing to Coco Gauff. At the French Open, she defeated qualifier Ana Konjuh and Aliaksandra Sasnovich before losing to Anastasia Pavlyuchenkova.

Sabalenka started her grass season at the German Open. She lost her opening match against Madison Keys. Nonetheless, Sabalenka and her compatriot Victoria Azarenka won the doubles event, defeating the top-seeded pair of Demi Schuurs and Nicole Melichar in the final. At the Eastbourne International, Sabalenka defeated qualifier Bernarda Pera and Alison Riske-Amritraj, without dropping a set, to reach the quarterfinals. In the quarterfinals, she lost to qualifier Camila Giorgi in three sets.

At the Wimbledon Championships, Sabalenka defeated qualifier Monica Niculescu in the first round. In the second round, she came from a set down to defeat wildcard entrant Katie Boulter. In the third round, she defeated qualifier Camila Osorio. She defeated No. 20 Elena Rybakina in three sets to reach her first major quarterfinal. She defeated No. 24 Ons Jabeur in straight sets to reach her first major semifinal, becoming the third Belarusian woman to reach Wimbledon semifinals following Natasha Zvereva in 1998 and Victoria Azarenka in 2011 and 2012. In the semifinals, she lost to No. 13 Karolína Plíšková in three sets. As a result, she reached a career-high ranking of No. 3.

Sabalenka started her North American hard court season at the Canadian Open. She defeated wildcard entrants Sloane Stephens and Rebecca Marino to reach the quarterfinals. She defeated No. 15 Victoria Azarenka to reach the semifinals, where she lost again to No. 6 Karolína Plíšková in straight sets. At the Cincinnati Open, she lost her opening-round match against Paula Badosa. Despite the loss, she reached a career-high ranking of No. 2.

At the US Open, Sabalenka defeated Nina Stojanović in the first round in three sets. She defeated Tamara Zidanšek, No. 29 Danielle Collins, No. 16 Elise Mertens, and No. 9 Barbora Krejčíková, without dropping a set, to reach her second major semifinal. In the semifinals, she lost to Leylah Fernandez in three sets.

Due to a positive COVID-19 test, Sabalenka was not able to play at Indian Wells. Sabalenka qualified for the WTA Finals in singles for the first time. She defeated Iga Świątek, but was eliminated by Paula Badosa and Maria Sakkari in the round-robin stage.

=== 2022: US Open semifinal ===
Sabalenka struggled with her serve at the beginning of 2022. At the Adelaide International 1, she lost her opening match against Kaja Juvan; at the Adelaide International 2, she lost her first round to qualifier Rebecca Peterson. At the Australian Open, she managed to dig out three-set wins against wildcard entrant Storm Sanders, Wang Xinyu, and Markéta Vondroušová, but lost in the fourth round to Kaia Kanepi in a three-set match, which ended in a third-set super-tiebreak.

At the Dubai Championships, Sabalenka defeated qualifier Marta Kostyuk before losing to Petra Kvitová. At the Qatar Open, Sabalenka beat wildcard entrant Alizé Cornet and Jil Teichmann, without dropping a set, to reach the quarterfinals. In the quarterfinals, she lost to No. 8 and eventual champion Iga Świątek in straight sets.

At the Indian Wells, Sabalenka lost her opening match against Jasmine Paolini. In Miami, she lost her opening match against Irina-Camelia Begu.

At the Charleston Open, Sabalenka lost in the third round to Amanda Anisimova. At the Stuttgart Open, Sabalenka defeated Bianca Andreescu and No. 6 Anett Kontaveit in three sets to reach the semifinals. She defeated No. 3 Paula Badosa in straight sets to reach her second straight Stuttgart final. In the final, she lost again to world No. 1 Iga Świątek in straight sets.

As the defending champion at the Madrid Open, Sabalenka was knocked out by Amanda Anisimova again in the first round. At the Italian Open, Sabalenka defeated Zhang Shuai and No. 11 Jessica Pegula, without dropping a set, to reach the quarterfinals. She defeated Amanda Anisimova in three sets to reach the semifinals. In the semifinals, she lost to world No. 1 Iga Świątek for the third time in 2022. At the French Open, she defeated Chloé Paquet and Madison Brengle before losing to Camila Giorgi.

Sabalenka began the grass-court season at the Libéma Open. She defeated Kateryna Baindl and wildcard entrant Arianne Hartono, without dropping a set, to reach the quarterfinals. She defeated Alison Van Uytvanck in three sets to reach the semifinals. She defeated Shelby Rogers in straight sets to make the final. In the final, she lost to Ekaterina Alexandrova in straight sets. Due to Wimbledon's ruling on Russian and Belarusian players, Sabalenka was banned from participating in the event, cutting her grass season short.

Sabalenka opened the US hardcourt swing in Silicon Valley Classic. She came from a set down to defeat lucky loser Caroline Dolehide in her opening match. In the quarterfinals, she lost to No. 12 and eventual champion Daria Kasatkina in three sets. At the Canadian Open, she defeated Sara Sorribes Tormo before losing to No. 11 Coco Gauff. At the Cincinnati Open, Sabalenka reached the last 16 as qualifier Anna Kalinskaya retired while trailing by a set. She defeated wildcard entrant Shelby Rogers in three sets to reach the quarterfinals. She defeated Zhang Shuai in straight sets to reach the semifinals. In the semifinals, she lost to qualifier and eventual champion Caroline Garcia in three sets.

At the US Open, Sabalenka defeated qualifier Catherine Harrison in the first round. In the second round, she came from a set down to defeat Kaia Kanepi. In the third round, she defeated qualifier Clara Burel in straight sets. In the fourth round, she came from a set down to defeat No. 19 Danielle Collins. She defeated No. 22 Karolína Plíšková in straight sets to reach her second consecutive US Open semifinal. In the semifinals, she was defeated by world No. 1 Iga Świątek for the fourth time this season.

At the San Diego Open, Sabalenka defeated wildcard entrant Sloane Stephens before losing to qualifier Donna Vekić. At the Guadalajara Open, she lost her opening match against Liudmila Samsonova.

Sabalenka qualified for the WTA Finals for a second straight year. She defeated world No. 2 Ons Jabeur and No. 3 Jessica Pegula in the round-robin stage, and No. 1 Iga Świątek in the semifinals. She became the fourth woman to defeat the top 3 players at the same tournament, joining Steffi Graf (1999 French Open), Serena Williams (2002 Miami Open), and Venus Williams (2008 WTA Finals). She lost her group match against Maria Sakkari and lost in the final to Caroline Garcia in straight sets.

=== 2023: Australian Open champion, No. 1 ===
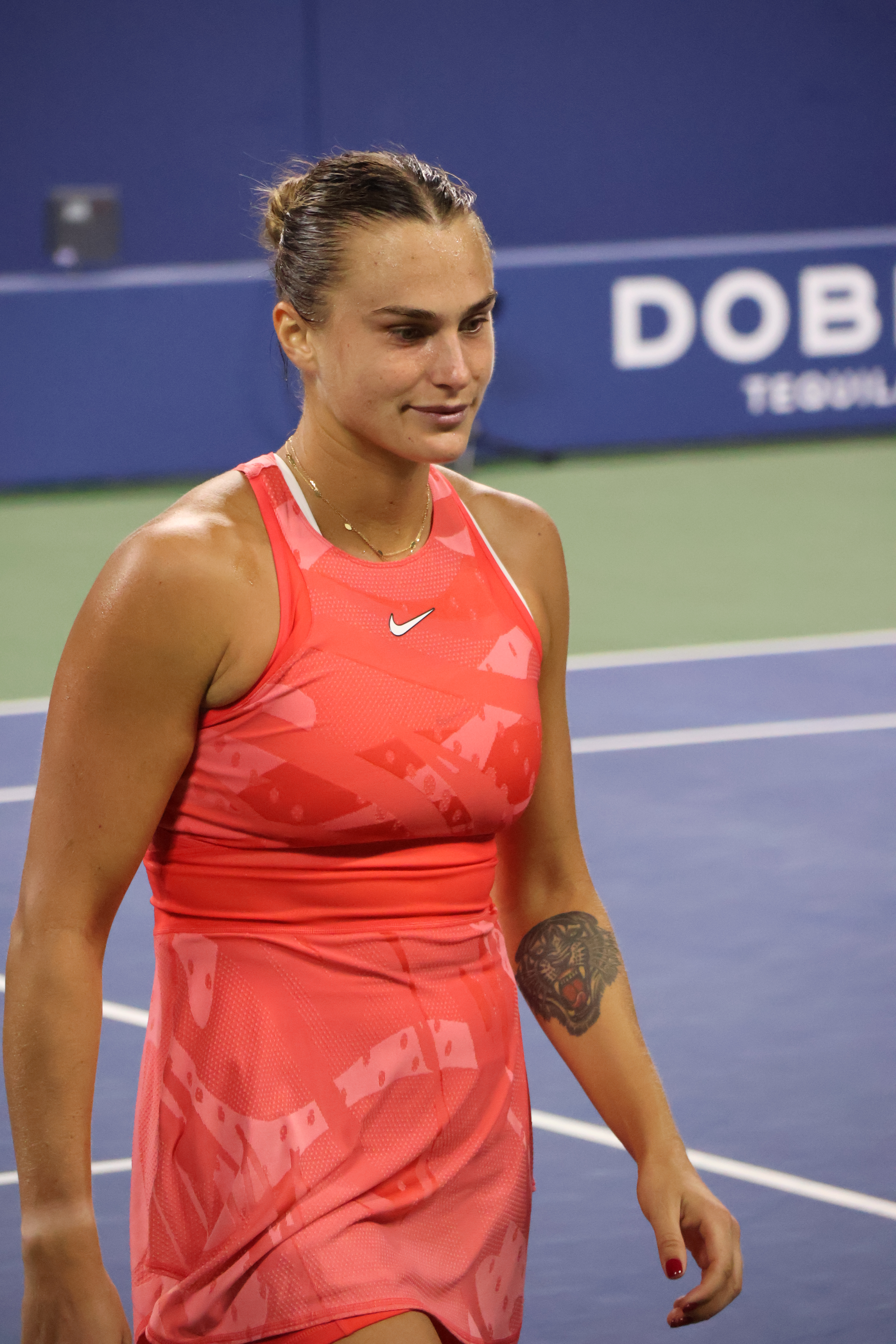
Sabalenka at the 2023 US Open

Sabalenka began her 2023 season at the Adelaide International. She defeated Liudmila Samsonova, Markéta Vondroušová, and Irina-Camelia Begu to reach the final. She defeated qualifier Linda Nosková to win the title, without dropping a set en route.

Seeded fifth at the Australian Open, Sabalenka defeated Tereza Martincová, Shelby Rogers, Elise Mertens, and No. 10 Belinda Bencic to reach her first-ever Australian Open quarterfinal. She then beat Donna Vekić to reach her fourth Grand Slam semifinal. She beat Magda Linette to secure her 10th straight-set victory of 2023 and make her first ever major final. In the final, she defeated No. 25 Elena Rybakina in three sets to win her first major title. She became the second Belarusian to ever win a major singles title after Victoria Azarenka in 2012 and 2013. After winning the title in Melbourne, Sabalenka rose back to No. 2 in the WTA rankings.

In Dubai, Sabalenka defeated lucky loser Lauren Davis in her opening match. In the third round, she came from a set down to defeat Jeļena Ostapenko. In the quarterfinals, she fell to the eventual champion Barbora Krejčíková in three sets.

At the Indian Wells, Sabalenka defeated Evgeniya Rodina in her opening match. She reached the fourth round as qualifier Lesia Tsurenko withdrew. She defeated Barbora Krejčíková in three sets to reach the quarterfinals. She defeated sixth seed Coco Gauff and seventh seed Maria Sakkari in straight sets to reach the final. In a rematch of their Australian Open final, she lost to tenth seed Elena Rybakina in straight sets.

In Miami, Sabalenka defeated Shelby Rogers, Marie Bouzková, and Barbora Krejčíková, without dropping a set, to reach the quarterfinals. In the quarterfinals, she was defeated by Sorana Cîrstea in straight sets.

Sabalenka started her clay court season at the Stuttgart Open. She defeated Barbora Krejčíková in straight sets to reach the quarterfinals. She defeated wildcard entrant Paula Badosa in three sets to reach the semifinals. She defeated Anastasia Potapova in straight sets to make her third straight Stuttgart final. In a rematch of last year's final, she was defeated by world No. 1 Iga Świątek in straight sets.

In Madrid, Sabalenka defeated Sorana Cîrstea and wildcard entrants Camila Osorio and Mirra Andreeva, without dropping a set, to reach the quarterfinals. In the quarterfinals, she came from a set down to beat Mayar Sherif. She defeated ninth seed Maria Sakkari in straight sets to reach her second Madrid final. In the final, she defeated world No. 1 Iga Świątek in three sets to win her second Madrid title and fifth WTA 1000 title.

In Rome, Sabalenka suffered her first early defeat of the year, losing her opening match to Sofia Kenin. At the French Open, Sabalenka defeated Marta Kostyuk, qualifier Iryna Shymanovich, Kamilla Rakhimova, and Sloane Stephens, without dropping a set, to reach her first French Open quarterfinal. She defeated Elina Svitolina in straight sets to reach her first French Open semifinal. In the semifinals, she lost to Karolína Muchová in three sets, despite leading 5–2 and holding match point.

Sabalenka began her grass court season at the German Open. She defeated qualifier Vera Zvonareva before losing to wildcard entrant Veronika Kudermetova. At the Wimbledon Championships, Sabalenka defeated Panna Udvardy in the first round. In the second round, she came from a set down to defeat Varvara Gracheva. She defeated Anna Blinkova, Ekaterina Alexandrova, and Madison Keys, without dropping a set, to reach her fourth consecutive major semifinal. In the semifinals, she lost to sixth seed Ons Jabeur in three sets.

Sabalenka started her North American hard court season in Montréal. She defeated Petra Martić before losing to Liudmila Samsonova. In Cincinnati, Sabalenka defeated qualifier Ann Li in three sets in her opening match. She defeated Daria Kasatkina in straight sets to reach the quarterfinals. In a rematch of their Wimbledon semifinal, she defeated fifth seed Ons Jabeur in straight sets. In a rematch of their French Open semifinal, she fell again to Karolína Muchová in three sets.

At the US Open, Sabalenka defeated Maryna Zanevska, Jodie Burrage, Clara Burel, Daria Kasatkina, and Zheng Qinwen, without dropping a set, to reach her third consecutive US Open semifinal. She became the first player to reach the semifinals of all four major events in one year since Serena Williams in 2016. She outlasted Madison Keys after losing the first set 6–0 to reach her first US Open final. In the final, she lost to sixth seed Coco Gauff in three sets. Due to the loss of No. 1 Iga Świątek in the fourth round, Sabalenka became, for the first time, the world No. 1 tennis player. She became the 29th player to be ranked No. 1 in the world on the WTA Tour, and the second Belarusian, after Victoria Azarenka. She was also the eighth female player to have been ranked No. 1 in the Open Era in both singles and doubles at some point in their careers. (Note: The other seven players to have been ranked No. 1 by the WTA in both singles and doubles in their career are Martina Navratilova, Arantxa Sánchez Vicario, Lindsay Davenport, Martina Hingis, Kim Clijsters, Venus Williams, and Serena Williams.)

After the US Open, Sabalenka played at the China Open. She defeated wildcard entrant Sofia Kenin, qualifier Katie Boulter, and Jasmine Paolini, without dropping a set, to reach the quarterfinals. In the quarterfinals, she lost to fifth seed Elena Rybakina in straight sets.

Sabalenka made her third consecutive appearance at the WTA Finals. She defeated Maria Sakkari and Elena Rybakina but lost to Jessica Pegula in the round-robin stage. In the semifinals, she lost to Iga Świątek in straight sets, who would go on to win the event. As a result, Świątek reclaimed the world No. 1 ranking and Sabalenka finished as year-end No. 2.

=== 2024: Two major titles, year-end No. 1 ===
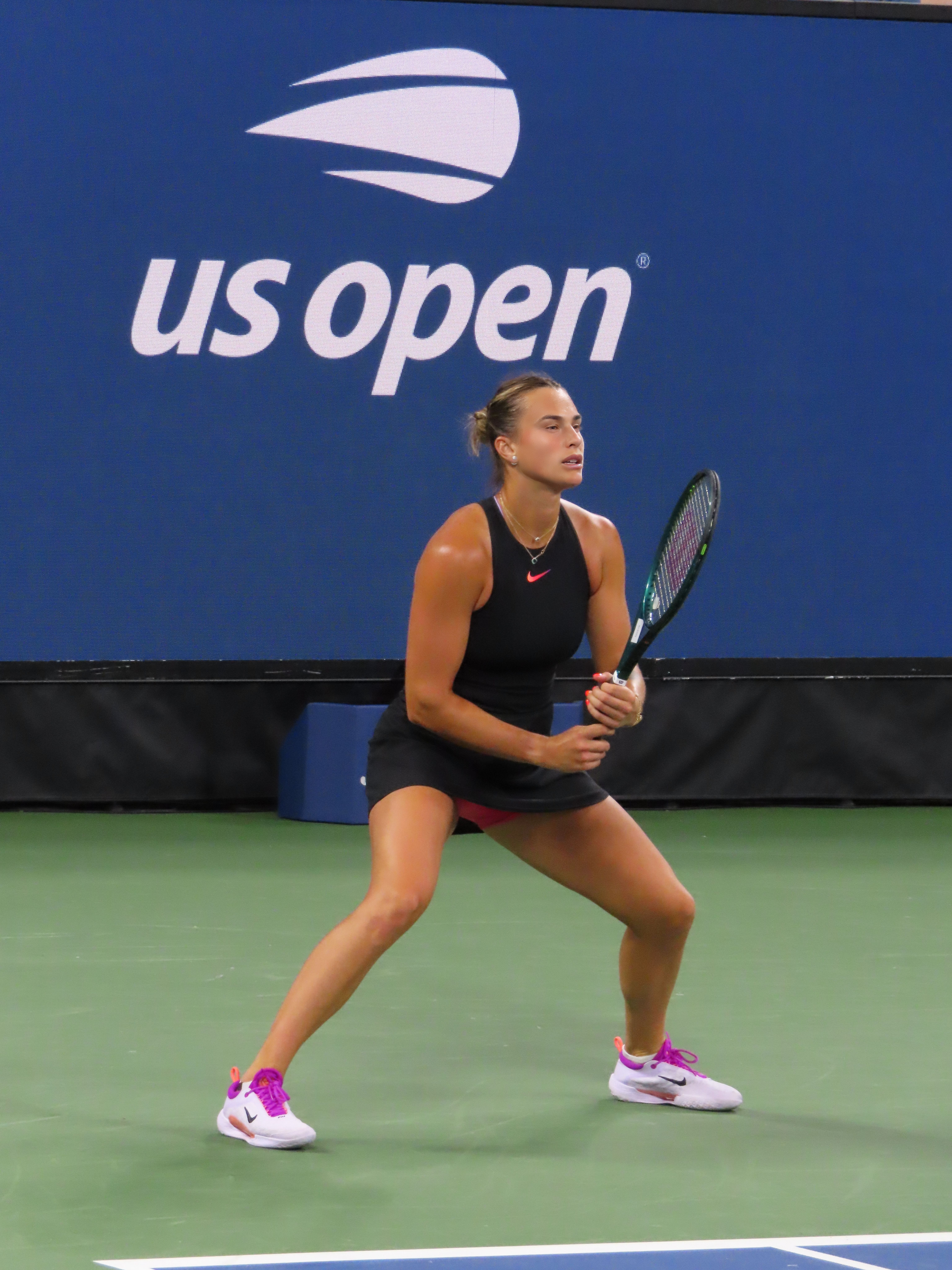
Sabalenka at the 2024 US Open

Sabalenka started her 2024 tennis season at the Brisbane International. She defeated Lucia Bronzetti, Zhu Lin, Daria Kasatkina, and Victoria Azarenka without dropping a set, to reach the final. In the final, she lost to second seed Elena Rybakina in straight sets.

At the Australian Open, Sabalenka overcame qualifier Ella Seidel, qualifier Brenda Fruhvirtová, Lesia Tsurenko, Amanda Anisimova, ninth seed Barbora Krejčíková, without dropping a set, to reach the semifinals. In a rematch of their US Open final, she defeated fourth seed Coco Gauff in straight sets to reach her second consecutive Australian Open final. In the final, she defeated Zheng Qinwen in straight sets, becoming the first woman to successfully defend her title at the Australian Open since Victoria Azarenka in 2013.

At the Indian Wells, Sabalenka defeated Peyton Stearns and wildcard entrant Emma Raducanu before losing to Emma Navarro. In Miami, she defeated Paula Badosa before losing to Anhelina Kalinina.

Sabalenka started her clay season in Stuttgart. She reached the quarterfinals when Paula Badosa retired, but was eliminated by sixth seed Markéta Vondroušová in three sets. As the defending champion in Madrid, Sabalenka reached the quarterfinals after three-set wins over Magda Linette, wildcard entrant Robin Montgomery, and Danielle Collins. She defeated Mirra Andreeva in straight sets to reach the semifinals. In the semifinals, she edged an epic three-set victory over fourth seed Elena Rybakina. In a rematch of the previous year's final, she faced world No. 1 Iga Świątek. Sabalenka had three championship points during the match, but eventually lost.

In Rome, Sabalenka came from a set down to defeat qualifier Katie Volynets in her opening match. In the third round, she defeated Dayana Yastremska in straight sets. In the fourth round, she came from a set down to defeat Elina Svitolina. She defeated ninth seed Jeļena Ostapenko and Danielle Collins in straight sets to reach the final. In the final, she faced again Iga Świątek, and lost in straight sets.

At the French Open, Sabalenka defeated Erika Andreeva, qualifier Moyuka Uchijima, Paula Badosa and Emma Navarro, without dropping a set, to reach the quarterfinals. In the quarterfinals, she was hampered by stomach issues and lost to Mirra Andreeva in three sets. Due to her loss, her ranking dropped to No. 3.

Sabalenka suffered a right shoulder injury that forced her to retire during her quarterfinal match against Anna Kalinskaya at the Berlin Open in June and she withdrew from the Wimbledon Championships, having failed to recover in time to play.

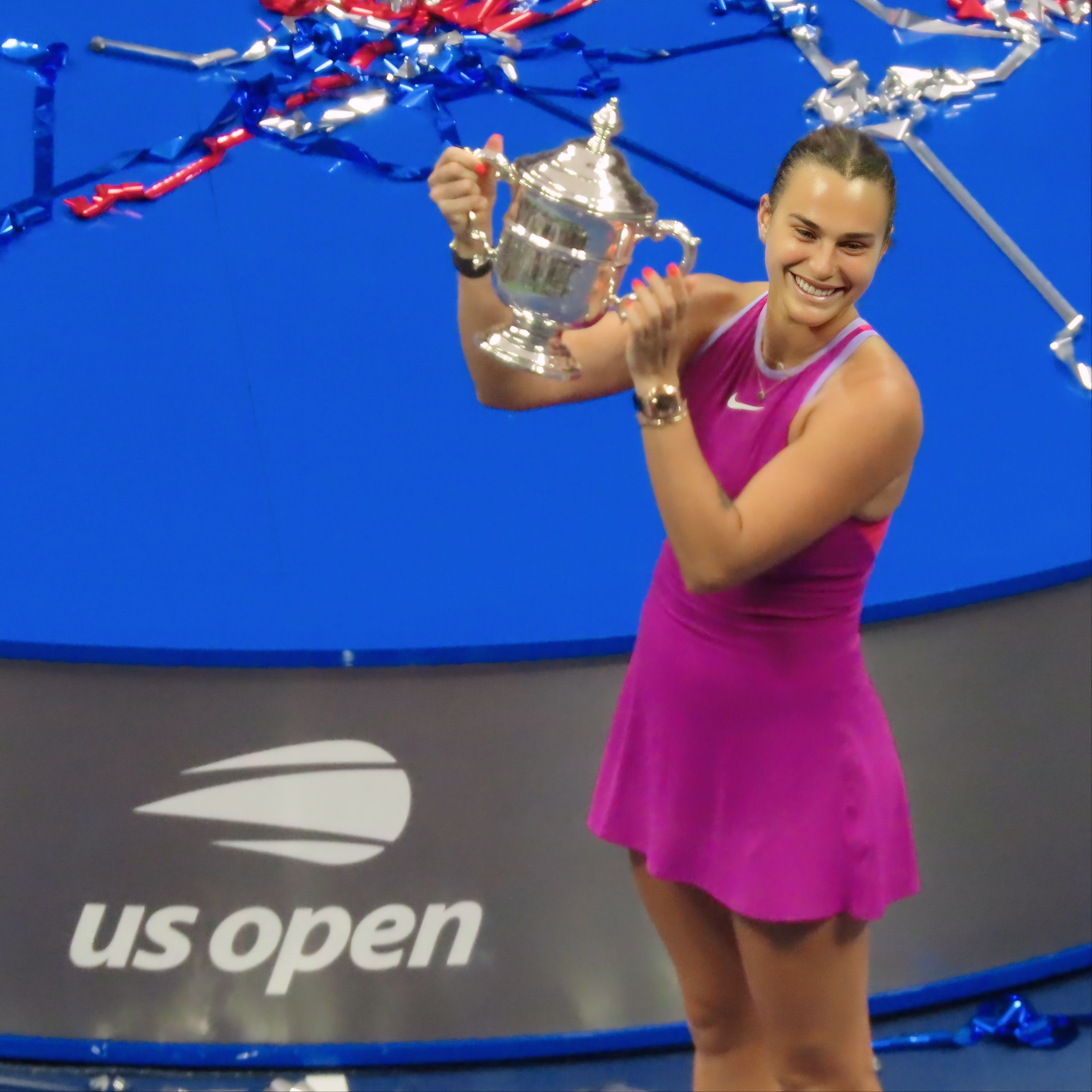
Sabalenka lifting the 2024 US Open singles trophy

Sabalenka returned from injury at the Washington DC Open. She defeated qualifier Kamilla Rakhimova and Victoria Azarenka to reach the semifinals, where she lost to Marie Bouzková in three sets. At the Canadian Open, Sabalenka defeated Yuan Yue and Katie Boulter to reach the quarterfinals, where she lost to Amanda Anisimova in straight sets.

At the Cincinnati Open, Sabalenka defeated Elisabetta Cocciaretto, Elina Svitolina, and Liudmila Samsonova to reach the semifinals. She defeated world No. 1 Iga Świątek in the semifinals, and defeated sixth seed Jessica Pegula to win the title, without dropping a set en route. Her ranking moved back to No. 2.

At the US Open, Sabalenka defeated qualifier Priscilla Hon and Lucia Bronzetti in straight sets. In the third round, she came from a set down to defeat Ekaterina Alexandrova. She defeated Elise Mertens, seventh seed Zheng Qinwen and Emma Navarro, without dropping a set, to reach her second straight US Open final. She defeated sixth seed Jessica Pegula in straight sets to win her first US Open singles title and third major singles title. She became the fifth woman to win the Australian Open and the US Open in the same year since 1988.

Sabalenka continued her great form in China. At the China Open, she defeated qualifier Mananchaya Sawangkaew, Ashlyn Krueger and Madison Keys, without dropping a set, to reach the quarterfinals. In the quarterfinals, she lost to Karolína Muchová in three sets. At the Wuhan Open, where she won back-to-back in 2018 and 2019, before the tournament was suspended due to COVID-19 from 2020 until 2023, Sabalenka defeated Kateřina Siniaková in straight sets in her opening match. In the third round, she came back from a set down against Yulia Putintseva. In the quarterfinals, she defeated Magdalena Fręch. In the semifinals, she mounted a comeback from a set and a break down against fourth seed Coco Gauff. In the final, she defeated fifth seed Zheng Qinwen in three sets to lift her third Wuhan Open title and her second WTA 1000 title for the 2024 season.

After 11 months off the top in October, Sabalenka regained the WTA world number-one ranking. Following wins against Zheng Qinwen and Jasmine Paolini in her first two group matches at the WTA Finals, combined with Świątek's loss to Coco Gauff, Sabalenka for the first time would finish as year-end No. 1. She became the 16th year-end No. 1 in rankings history. She lost her last group match to Elena Rybakina and was defeated by Coco Gauff in the semifinals.

In December, Sabalenka was named WTA Player of the Year.

=== 2025: US Open title, year-end No. 1 ===
Sabalenka started 2025 at the Brisbane International. She defeated Renata Zarazúa, Yulia Putintseva, Marie Bouzková, and No. 16 Mirra Andreeva, without dropping a set, to reach the final. In the final, she came back from a set down against qualifier Polina Kudermetova to win the title. As the two-time defending champion at the Australian Open, Sabalenka defeated Sloane Stephens, Jéssica Bouzas Maneiro, Clara Tauson, and No. 15 Mirra Andreeva, without dropping a set, to reach the quarterfinals. She defeated Anastasia Pavlyuchenkova in three sets to reach the semifinals. She defeated No.12 Paula Badosa in straight sets to advance to her third straight Australian Open final. In the final, she lost to No. 14 Madison Keys in three sets.

At the Qatar Open, Sabalenka lost her opening match against Ekaterina Alexandrova. At the Dubai Championships, she defeated qualifier Veronika Kudermetov before losing to Clara Tauson.

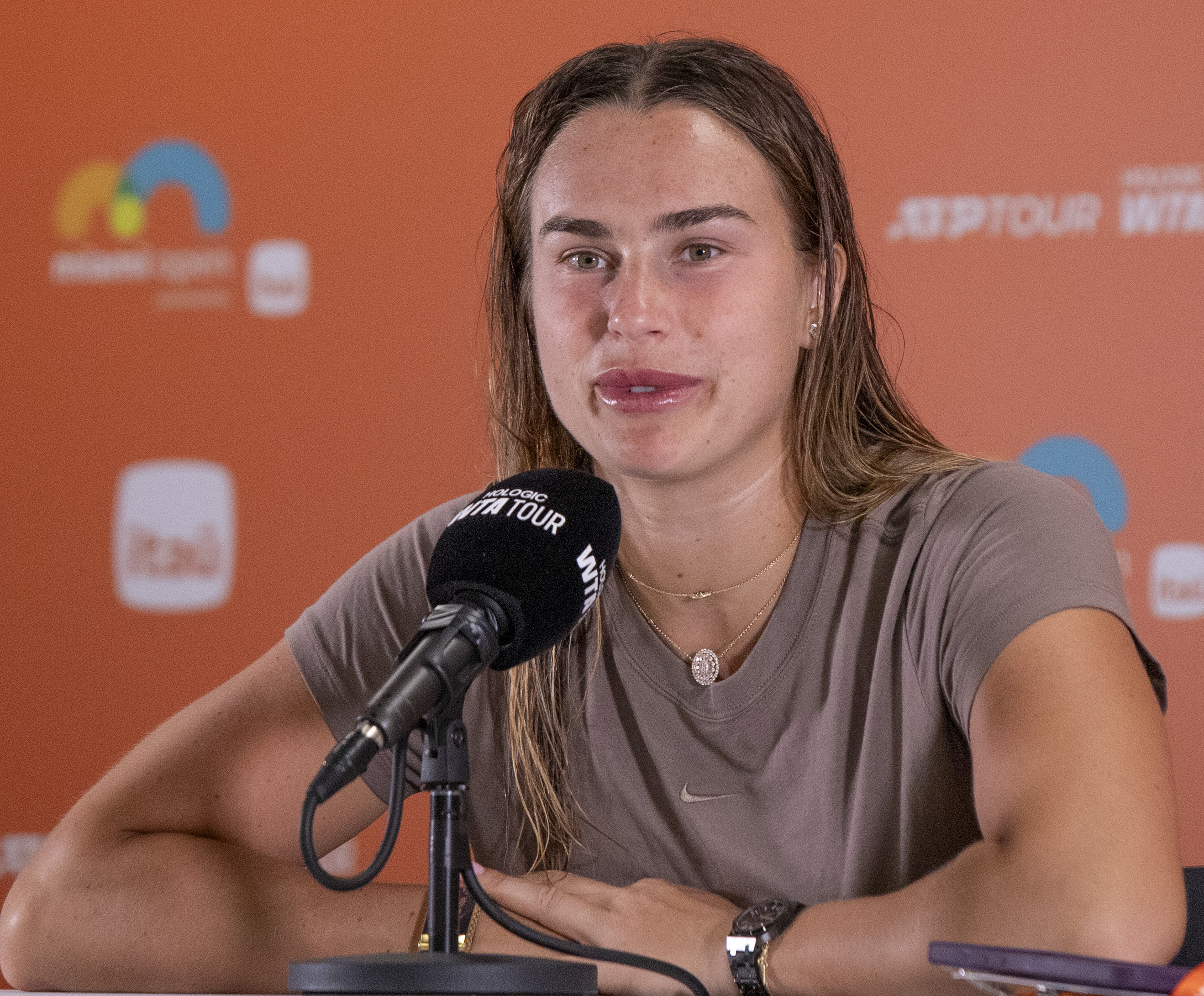
Sabalenka at a 2025 Miami Open press conference

At the Indian Wells, Sabalenka defeated McCartney Kessler, Lucia Bronzetti, lucky loser Sonay Kartal, and Liudmila Samsonova, without dropping a set, to reach the semifinals. In a rematch of their Australian Open final, she defeated fifth seed Madison Keys in straight sets to reach her second Indian Wells final. In the final, she lost to ninth seed Mirra Andreeva in three sets.

At the Miami Open, Sabalenka defeated Viktoriya Tomova in her opening match. She reached the fourth round as qualifier Elena-Gabriela Ruse retired while trailing by a set. She defeated defending champion Danielle Collins, ninth seed Zheng Qinwen, sixth seed Jasmine Paolini, and fourth seed Jessica Pegula to win the title, without dropping a set en route. She became the eighth player to have surpassed the 10,000 points mark in the WTA rankings.

Starting her clay season at the Stuttgart Open, Sabalenka reached the quarterfinals via walkover when Anastasia Potapova withdrew due to injury. She defeated Elise Mertens and fifth seed Jasmine Paolini, without dropping a set, to reach her fourth Stuttgart final. She lost the championship match against Jeļena Ostapenko in straight sets.

At the Madrid Open, Sabalenka defeated qualifier Anna Blinkova in her opening match. In the third round, she came from a set down to defeat Elise Mertens. She defeated Peyton Stearns, Marta Kostyuk, and Elina Svitolina, without dropping a set, to reach her fourth Madrid final. In the final, she defeated fourth seed Coco Gauff in straight sets to claim her third Madrid Open title. She became the third woman to surpass 11,000 points in the WTA rankings after Serena Williams and Iga Świątek.

In Rome, Sabalenka defeated Anastasia Potapova in her opening match. In the third round, she came from a set down to defeat Sofia Kenin. She defeated Marta Kostyuk in straight sets to reach the quarterfinals, where she lost to eighth seed Zheng Qinwen in straight sets. At the French Open, Sabalenka defeated Kamilla Rakhimova, Jil Teichmann, Olga Danilović, Amanda Anisimova, and Zheng Qinwen, without dropping a set, to reach the semifinals. In the semifinals, she defeated three-time defending champion Iga Świątek in three sets to reach her first French Open final. In a rematch of their Madrid Open final, she lost to second seed Coco Gauff in three sets.

Sabalenka started her grass season at the Berlin Open. She defeated qualifier Rebeka Masarova in straight sets to reach the quarterfinals. She defeated No. 11 Elena Rybakina in three sets to reach the semifinals. In the semifinals, she lost to eventual champion Markéta Vondroušová in straight sets. At the Wimbledon Championships, Sabalenka beat qualifier Carson Branstine, Marie Bouzková, Emma Raducanu, and Elise Mertens, without dropping a set, to reach the quarterfinals. She defeated Laura Siegemund in three sets to advance to the semifinals. In the semifinals, she lost to No. 12 Amanda Anisimova in three sets. Despite this loss, she became the first woman to surpass 12,000 points on the WTA rankings since Serena Williams in 2015.

Sabalenka started her US hard court season at the Cincinnati Open. She defeated Markéta Vondroušová in straight sets in her opening match. In the third round, she defeated Emma Raducanu in three sets. She defeated Jessica Bouzas Maneiro in straight sets to advance to the quarterfinals. In the quarterfinals, she lost to ninth seed Elena Rybakina in straight sets. At the US Open, Sabalenka defeated Rebeka Masarova, Polina Kudermetova, Leylah Fernandez, and Cristina Bucșa, without dropping a set, to reach the quarterfinals. She advanced to the semifinals via walkover when Markéta Vondroušová withdrew due to injury. In a rematch of their 2024 US Open final, she came from a set down to defeat fourth seed Jessica Pegula and reach her third consecutive US Open final. In a rematch of their Wimbledon semifinal, she defeated eighth seed Amanda Anisimova in straight sets to win her second US Open title and fourth major title. She became the first player to defend a US Open singles title since Serena Williams in 2014.

As the three-time defending champion at the Wuhan Open, Sabalenka came from a set down to overcome Rebecca Sramkova in her opening match. She defeated Liudmila Samsonova and eight seed Elena Rybakina in straight sets to advance to the semifinals. In the semifinals, she lost to sixth seed Jessica Pegula in three sets.

Sabalenka made her fifth consecutive appearance at the WTA Finals. She won all her three matches in the round-robin stage against Jasmine Paolini, Jessica Pegula, and Coco Gauff to reach the semifinals. She defeated Amanda Anisimova in three sets to reach her second WTA Finals final. In the final, she lost to Elena Rybakina in straight sets.

For the second year in a row, Sabalenka finished as the year-end No. 1. She also held the No. 1 position uninterrupted through the entire season. She was also named WTA Player of the Year for the second year in a row.

On 28 December 2025, Sabalenka (women's singles world No. 1) and Nick Kyrgios (men's singles world No. 671) contested an exhibition match promoted as the Battle of the Sexes at the Coca-Cola Arena in Dubai. The event was organized by their shared management agency, Evolve. The match was played as a three-set contest under modified rules: the dimensions of Sabalenka's side of the court were reduced by 9%, and both players were restricted to a single serve per point. In the event of a tie, a 10-point match tiebreak would have been played. According to Evolve, the court-size adjustment was intended to "reflect average movement-speed differences between men and women". Kyrgios defeated Sabalenka in straight sets, 6–3, 6–3.

=== 2026: Sunshine Double, Australian Open and US Open finalist ===
Sabalenka began her 2026 season at the Brisbane International. She defeated Cristina Bucșa, Sorana Cîrstea, fifth seed Madison Keys, Karolína Muchová, and Marta Kostyuk to successfully defend her title, without dropping a set en route.

At the Australian Open, Sabalenka defeated wildcard entrant Tiantsoa Sarah Rakotomanga Rajaonah, qualifier Bai Zhuoxuan, Anastasia Potapova, Victoria Mboko, Iva Jovic, and Elina Svitolina to reach her fourth consecutive Australian Open final, without dropping a set en route. In a rematch of their 2025 WTA Finals and 2023 Australian Open finals, she was defeated by fifth seed Elena Rybakina in three sets.

Sabalenka skipped the Middle East swing for fatigue-related reasons. She returned to play at the Indian Wells Open. She defeated qualifier Himeno Sakatsume, Jaqueline Cristian, Naomi Osaka, tenth seed Victoria Mboko, and Linda Nosková to reach her third Indian Wells final, without dropping a set en route. In a rematch of their Australian Open and 2023 Indian Wells Open finals, she defeated third seed Elena Rybakina to win her first Indian Wells title and tenth WTA 1000 title, saving a match point in the third-set tiebreaker.

At the Miami Open, Sabalenka defeated Ann Li, Caty McNally, Zheng Qinwen, and Hailey Baptiste to reach the semifinals, without dropping a set en route. In the semifinals, she defeated third seed Elena Rybakina in straight sets to reach her second straight Miami final. In the final, she defeated fourth seed Coco Gauff in three sets to win her second straight Miami Open title. She became the first player since Iga Świątek in 2022 to complete the Sunshine Double and the fifth woman overall to complete the Sunshine Double in singles. She also became the first player, male or female, to complete the achievement in both singles and doubles, having previously completed the Sunshine Double in doubles at the 2019 Miami Open.

Due to an injury, Sabalenka withdrew from Stuttgart, where she was runner-up the previous year. She started her clay season with a first round bye in Madrid. She then defeated Peyton Stearns, and 29th seed Jaqueline Cristian to reach fourth round. In the fourth round, she came back from a set and a break down to defeat Naomi Osaka to reach her 17th consecutive quarterfinal on the WTA tour. She lost in the querterfinals to Hailey Baptiste after having six match points. She received bye in the first round in Rome, then she defeated Barbora Krejčíková in straight sets, before losing to 26th seed Sorana Cirstea in the third round after being a break and a set up, thus marking an end to her 17 consecutive quarterfinals streak on WTA Tour. At the French Open, Sabalenka reached the quarterfinals after defeating fellow Grand Slam champion Naomi Osaka in the first women's night session match since 2023. However, she then lost to 25th seed Diana Shnaider after a bagel in the third set, ending her hopes of securing a slam on a natural surface.

Sabalenka began her grass-court season at Berlin, where she defeated Ekaterina Alexandrova, after receiving a first round bye. She overcame a second set deficit to defeat Nikola Bartůňková to advance to the semifinals, where she lost to Jessica Pegula with a third set bagel. At Wimbledon, Sabalenka lost in the fourth round to Osaka. This marked the first time since the 2022 French Open that she lost a major match before the quarterfinals, snapping a streak of 14 major quarterfinal appearances.

At the Canadian Open, Sabalenka lost to Alexandrova in the fourth round. She had another fourth-round appearance at the Cincinnati Open, but lost to Sára Bejlek in straight sets. Sabalenka entered the US Open being in contention for the world no. 1 ranking. She ultimately reached the final and lost to Rybakina in three sets, ending her bid for a three-peat. She also lost the no. 1 ranking to Rybakina, ending her reign of 99 consecutive weeks atop the rankings, the sixth-longest streak of all time.

== National representation ==
=== Fed Cup ===
==== Early appearances ====
Sabalenka represented Belarus at the Junior Fed Cup in 2014, with the team finishing in sixth place. She then made her senior Fed Cup debut for Belarus in April 2016, losing a dead rubber doubles match against Russia. Nonetheless, the Belarusian team led by Victoria Azarenka and Aliaksandra Sasnovich won the tie to qualify for the top-tier World Group the following season for the first time in their history.

==== 2017: Surprise runner-up in World Group debut ====
The Belarus Fed Cup team made their debut in the World Group and ultimately reached the final, despite being the underdogs in all three ties. Little was expected from the team because they were without their veteran leader Azarenka, who missed the first two ties on maternity leave and the last because of a custody battle. Without her, Belarus was led by Sabalenka and Sasnovich, neither of whom had ever been ranked above No. 76 by the time of the final. However, they did have the advantage of playing all of their ties at home in Minsk.

The ties in the quarterfinals against the Netherlands in February and the semi-finals against Switzerland in April both played out in the same way. While Sabalenka lost her opening matches to their opponents' respective top-ranked players of Kiki Bertens and Timea Bacsinszky, Sasnovich was able to give Belarus a 2–1 lead in each instance. Sabalenka then clinched both ties, with wins over Michaëlla Krajicek and No. 54 Viktorija Golubic, respectively. She was only ranked No. 125 at the time of the semifinal, with no career tour match wins outside of Fed Cup.

"I've never felt so much emotion in a match. When you play at home and you are down 0–1 and you have to win and you fight with yourself... I just started crying because it was such an important match."

— Sabalenka on her Fed Cup rubber win over Stephens

On the opening day of the final against the United States, Sabalenka upset the reigning US Open champion and world No. 13, Sloane Stephens, to level the tie after Sasnovich lost her first rubber to No. 10, CoCo Vandeweghe. The next day began with Sabalenka losing to Vandeweghe, before Sasnovich again levelled the tie by defeating Stephens. Sabalenka and Sasnovich were then selected for the decisive doubles rubber for the Fed Cup crown, but the duo were comprehensively defeated by Vandeweghe and Shelby Rogers.

Despite finishing as runner-up, Belarus's Fed Cup success helped popularize women's tennis in Belarus, and vaulted Sabalenka and Sasnovich into international prominence. Sasnovich said, "When we played the quarterfinals and semi-finals in Minsk, a lot of people were coming to see our matches. They finally saw tennis in life, and it's like a popularization... I want my country to improve even more in tennis, because I think we can have even more from Belarus."

==== 2018–19: Avoiding demotion, another semifinal ====
Belarus was unable to repeat their 2017 Fed Cup success in 2018. Their quarterfinal tie was held in Minsk against Germany. Although Sabalenka won both of her singles rubbers, Sasnovich and Vera Lapko lost each of theirs to set up a decisive doubles rubber. Sabalenka and doubles specialist Lidziya Marozava were selected for the match, with Sabalenka playing on short rest directly after her last singles match. After taking the first set against Anna-Lena Grönefeld and Tatjana Maria, they ultimately lost the rubber and the tie.

Their next tie was again contested in Minsk as part of the World Group play-offs, with Slovakia competing to take Belarus's place in the World Group the following season. Sabalenka and Sasnovich each split their two singles rubbers, with Sabalenka being upset by Viktória Kužmová. Doubles specialists Lapko and Marozava were chosen for the final rubber and the pair won the match to keep Belarus in the World Group for 2019.

In the 2019 Fed Cup, Belarus were drawn against Germany in the quarterfinals for the second consecutive year. After Sasnovich won the opening rubber against Maria, Sabalenka won both of her singles rubbers against Andrea Petkovic and Laura Siegemund to clinch the tie. They advanced to face Australia in the semi-finals. Only two players from each team participated: Sabalenka and Azarenka for Belarus, and Ashleigh Barty and Samantha Stosur for Australia. Both Sabalenka and Azarenka defeated Stosur, but lost to Barty. In the decisive doubles rubber, Barty and Stosur won in three sets to eliminate Belarus.

== Rivalries ==
=== Elena Rybakina ===
Sabalenka and Elena Rybakina have played each other 18 times since 2019, with Sabalenka leading their head-to-head 10–8 whereas Rybakina leads the finals 5–2. Both players are known for their aggressive baseline play, resulting in fast-paced and intense matches.

They have faced off in three major finals with the 2023 Australian Open won by Sabalenka, and the 2026 Australian Open and US Open both won by Rybakina.

Their other notable encounters include the 2023 BNP Paribas Open finals, 2024 Madrid Open semifinal, 2025 WTA Finals finals, the 2026 BNP Paribas Open final, and the 2026 US Open final.

=== Iga Świątek ===
Sabalenka and Iga Świątek have met 13 times since 2021, with Świątek in control of the head-to-head at 8–5. Their rivalry has been seen as becoming one of the greatest in women's tennis. Their most praised matches include the 2024 Madrid Open final, where Świątek defeated defending champion Sabalenka in three sets in 3 hours and 11 minutes, saving three championship points in the process, and the 2023 Madrid Open final, where Sabalenka won in three sets in 2 hours and 25 minutes against Świątek to claim her second Madrid title. Sabalenka and Świątek played each other at the 2025 French Open, which Sabalenka won in three sets.

=== Coco Gauff ===
Sabalenka and Coco Gauff have met 13 times since 2020, with Sabalenka edging the head-to-head at 7–6. They have played each other multiple times at majors, the first being the 2023 US Open final. Sabalenka lost that match despite winning the first set. Sabalenka defeated Gauff at the 2024 Australian Open semifinals on her way to defending the title. Sabalenka and Gauff faced off again in the final of the 2025 French Open, with Gauff overtaking Sabalenka for her first French Open Major Championship win and second Grand Slam overall. Sabalenka would avenge that loss by knocking Gauff out of the 2025 WTA Finals where Gauff was the defending champion. Sabalenka would meet Gauff for the first time in 2026 in the Miami finals, where Sabalenka battled through Gauff in three sets to win Miami for the second time, as well as the Sunshine Double.

=== Jessica Pegula ===
Sabalenka has developed a fairly storied rivalry with Jessica Pegula. Their consistency on hard courts leads to them frequently facing each other in the latter stages of events. The two have met 14 times since 2020, with Sabalenka controlling the head-to-head 10–4. Pegula would win their first meeting in the third round of the 2020 Western & Southern Open in three sets. They would face off at the 2024 US Open final in which Sabalenka would win 7–5, 7–5 to earn her first US Open title. The two would have a rematch of their US Open final in the 2025 US Open semifinals, where Sabalenka would win a close three-set match 4–6, 6–3, 6–4 on her way to defending her US Open title. Pegula would snap Sabalenka's 20-match winning streak as well as her 2025 tiebreak record in their following match in Wuhan, before pulling out a three-set win 2–6, 6–4, 7–6(2). They faced each other once more in the Riyadh 2025 WTA Finals, where Sabalenka defeated Pegula in three sets. The pair's first meeting on grass came at the 2026 Berlin Tennis Open, which Pegula won in three sets, bageling Sabalenka in the final set.

=== Jasmine Paolini ===
Sabalenka has developed a recurring rivalry with Jasmine Paolini, which she leads 6–2. The pair first met at the 2017 Ilkley Trophy, where Paolini defeated Sabalenka in three sets. Paolini later earned another notable win at the 2022 Indian Wells Open, defeating Sabalenka 2–6, 6–3, 6–3. Sabalenka has otherwise controlled the matchup, winning their later meetings at events including Beijing, the Miami Open, the Stuttgart Open, and the WTA Finals. Their matches have contrasted Sabalenka's power-based baseline game with Paolini's speed, court coverage, and ability to extend rallies.

=== Amanda Anisimova ===
Sabalenka has also developed a rivalry with Amanda Anisimova. The pair have played 11 times with Sabalenka trailing 5–6. They've met six times in Grand Slams including 3 consecutive major contests in 2025 where they're tied 3–3. Anisimova defeated Sabalenka en route to her first major semifinal at 2019 French Open and also in the semifinal of 2025 Wimbledon to reach her first major final. They met in the final of 2025 US Open where Sabalenka won 6–3, 7–6^{(7–3)} to win her fourth major. In 2025, they met again in the semifinal to WTA Finals won by Sabalenka.

== Playing style ==
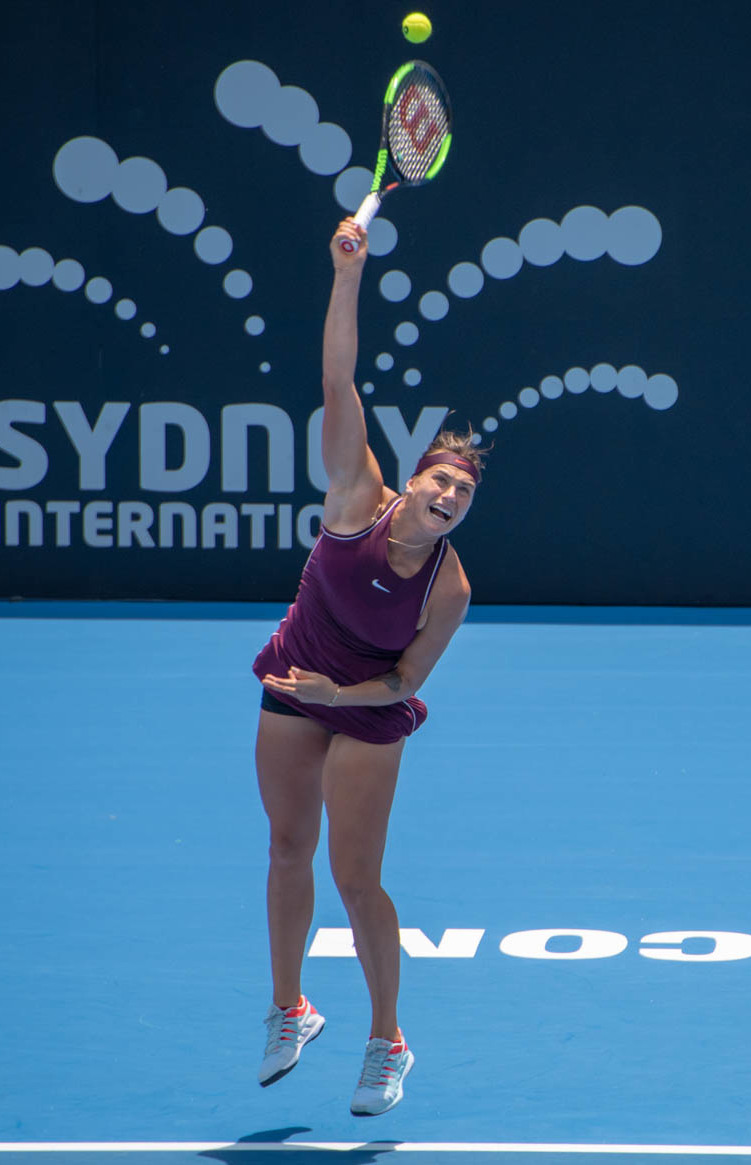
Sabalenka serving at the 2019 Sydney International

Sabalenka is an aggressive baseliner whose game is characterised by a powerful serve and equally powerful groundstrokes. Her game is based around taking control of points, with a knack for turning defensive positions into offensive opportunities. Due to her aggression, she usually hits a high number of both winners and unforced errors off her groundstrokes, which are hit with relentless pace and depth. At the 2024 US Open, she struck her forehand at an average speed of 129 km/h (80 mph). Sabalenka's big serve is central to her game: in 2024 she won 62.7% of points on her serve, ranking fifth among the players on tour, and won 78.5% of her service games.

Sabalenka's improved consistency on serve was the key which allowed her to ascend to the top of the WTA rankings. In the past, she struggled with an inconsistent serve, leading to a high double fault count; she served 166 double faults in 2020, the most of any player. She notably suffered from the yips from the 2021 WTA Finals and into 2022, serving 152 double faults in 11 matches, an average of 14 double faults a match. Following the 2022 Canadian Open, she hired biomechanics expert Gavin Macmillan to revamp her serve. Sabalenka served a total of 440 double faults in 2022, but her serve quickly saw improvements in 2023 under Macmillan's guidance, and has since become a reliable weapon.

As Sabalenka's game has matured, she has also developed better shot selection and more variety. When she first arrived on tour, she was sometimes described as a player who hit everything as hard as she could. In the summer of 2018, her coach Dmitry Tursunov said her game was already evolving, and, "The major thing is she stopped trying [to] hit a winner with every shot." Sabalenka has become increasingly willing to experiment with variety on her groundstrokes, and with finishing more points at the net. During the 2024 clay season, she began to incorporate more drop shots into her game, which pair well with her power from the baseline.

Sabalenka is primarily known for her success on hardcourt. Nineteen of her twenty-two singles titles, including all four of her major titles, have been won on hardcourt, which suits her game due to its consistent bounce and fast-paced play. However, she is also recognised as a consistent contender in the late stages of grass and clay court tournaments. She has been particularly successful on faster clay courts, such as the Madrid Open, where she won the title in 2021, 2023, and 2025. She also reached her first major final on clay at the French Open in 2025.

Sabalenka has become increasingly notable for her ability to win tiebreaks. In 2025, she set an Open Era record for most tiebreaks won by a woman in a single season, winning 22 out of 25 played. This included a streak of nineteen consecutive tiebreaks won between February and October. In 2026, Sabalenka won her twentieth consecutive tiebreak. While Sabalenka is known for her clutch factor in tiebreaks, she has also lost a large number of closely-contested prominent matches, such as the 2025 French Open final and 2026 Australian Open final, and holds a 22–20 (52%) record in singles finals overall.

Sabalenka frequently accompanies her shots with loud grunting. She said, "Honestly, I don't even hear myself when I am playing." She expressed her hope that her grunting does not disturb her opponents. At the Australian Open in 2018, the crowd mocked her habit in a match against Ashleigh Barty. She is an expressive personality on court.

== Coaches ==
Sabalenka had worked with Khalil Ibrahimov for two years up until early 2018. At this point, she began working with Swedish former professional tennis players Magnus Norman and Magnus Tideman. Dmitry Tursunov became her primary coach in time for the grass court season in 2018. Sabalenka briefly split with Tursunov after the 2019 US Open. Although they reunited later in the year, she made the split permanent at the end of the season. Sabalenka briefly worked with Dieter Kindlmann before switching coaches to her longtime hitting partner and compatriot Anton Dubrov, aged 25 at the time. In August 2022, Sabalenka hired biomechanics specialist Gavin MacMillan to improve on her serve. In 2025, Belarusian former professional tennis player and 10-time major doubles champion Max Mirnyi joined Sabalenka's coaching team as a consultant.

As of 2025, her coaching team includes Dubrov; Mirnyi; fitness trainer Jason Stacy, a martial arts expert; and hitting partner Andrei Vasilevski.

== Sponsorships ==
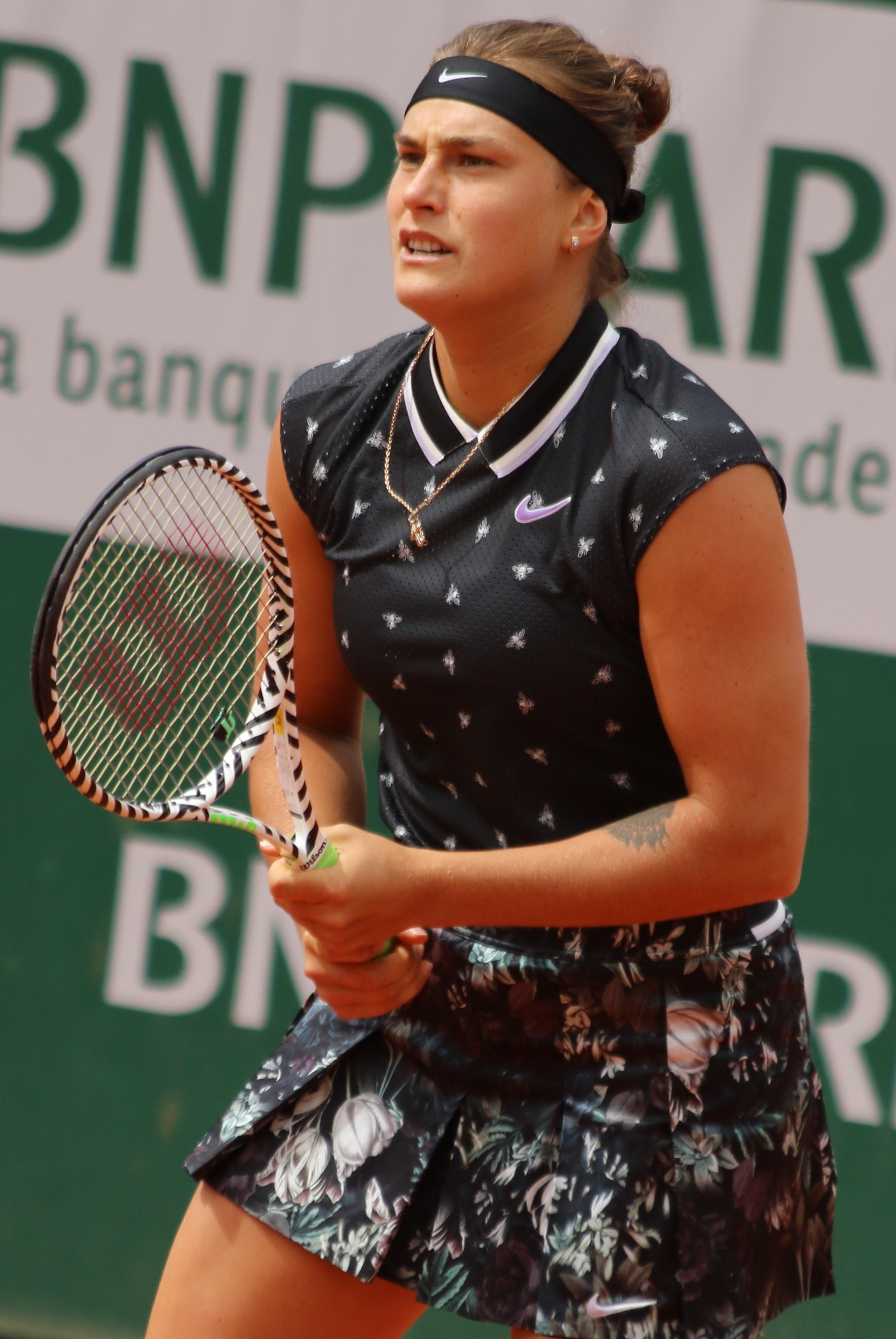
Sabalenka sponsored by Nike for sportswear and Wilson for racquets

Sabalenka had been represented by IMG. In January 2025, she departed from IMG and signed with Evolve, a company co-founded by Naomi Osaka.

In 2017, Sabalenka signed a sponsorship deal with Nike. Nike created a custom outfit for her for the 2023 US Open. She uses the Wilson Blade 98 18x20 for her racquets. She co-deigned the Wilson Blade 98 v9 Fighter Edition for her run at the 2025 US Open. In 2023, Sabalenka partnered with Maestro Dobel Tequila. In 2024, Sabalenka partnered with superfood brand Oakberry and wearable technology brand Whoop, and joined Audemars Piguet as a friend of the brand. In 2025, Sabalenka became a global ambassador and minority shareholder of IM8, a health‑supplement brand co‑founded by former footballer David Beckham, and partnered with hydration beverage brand Electrolit.

== Personal life ==
Sabalenka has a tiger tattoo on her left arm that has earned her the nickname "The Tiger", which she has used to refer to herself. She studied at the Belarusian State University in a sports-related program. Her tennis idols growing up were Serena Williams and Maria Sharapova. Her father Sergey, a former ice hockey player, died suddenly in 2019 at age 43. He had meningitis.

Sabalenka's ex-boyfriend, Konstantin Koltsov, died of an apparent suicide in March 2024 at age 42. She became engaged to Brazilian entrepreneur Georgios Frangulis on March 3, 2026.

=== Political views ===
In August 2020, during the 2020–2021 Belarusian protests, Sabalenka criticised the government of Alexander Lukashenko for its dispersal of peaceful protests and called for no violence, but was criticised by members of the Belarusian opposition for not using her platform to advocate the protest movement's goals. She separately praised the Belarusian government for "everything that is done for the country in general and for sports in particular". In 2020, during widespread protests after the disputed election, Sabalenka signed an open letter that said that sport should remain outside of politics. Belarusian media considered the letter supportive of Lukashenko, as it followed an open letter by Belarusian sporting figures demanding the election be invalidated.

Following the start of the Russian invasion of Ukraine, Sabalenka expressed support for the Ukrainian people and the use of Ukraine-coloured ribbons: "I feel like people need our support. I just hope they understand that we're all really concerned. I think even 'sad' isn't even the right word." In January 2023, with regard to the war and the banning of Russian and Belarusian players from the 2022 Wimbledon Championships, Sabalenka said, "I just understand that it's not my fault." Her comments on the Russian invasion of Ukraine and the situation of Ukrainian tennis players were criticised by Lesia Tsurenko's coach Nikita Vlasov and former Ukrainian player Sergiy Stakhovsky for lacking substance and compassion. Sabalenka later indicated support for ending the war in Ukraine, saying: "If I could stop the war I would do it but unfortunately that doesn't lie in my hands. I just hope for peace."

During a press conference at the 2023 French Open, when asked about the war by Ukrainian journalist Daria Meshcheriakova, she said: "Nobody in this world, Russian athletes or Belarusian athletes, support the war. Nobody. How can we support the war? Nobody, normal people will never support it." She later said: "I don't want my country to be in any conflict, I don't support war, meaning I don't support Lukashenko right now."

=== Comments on transgender athletes ===
In December 2025, Sabalenka stated in an interview with Piers Morgan that she opposed the participation of transgender women in women's tennis. While saying she had "nothing against" transgender people, she argued that transgender women retained a biological advantage over female players and that it was unfair for women to compete against "biological men." She also said that female athletes train throughout their lives to reach the highest level and should not have to compete against opponents whom she believed possessed inherent physical advantages.

In August 2026, Sabalenka reiterated her views on transgender athletes saying "it would be not really fair for the woman to compete against biological man" and voiced support for the WTA's new gender-testing policy that bans trans women from participating in the WTA Tour.

=== Television and film ===
Sabalenka appears in the tennis docuseries Break Point, which premiered on Netflix on 13 January 2023.

== Career statistics ==
=== Grand Slam tournament performance timelines ===
Key
**W**	F	SF	QF	#R	RR	Q#	DNQ	A	NH

(W) winner; (F) finalist; (SF) semifinalist; (QF) quarterfinalist; (#R) rounds 4, 3, 2, 1; (RR) round-robin stage; (Q#) qualification round; (DNQ) did not qualify; (A) absent; (NH) not held; (SR) strike rate (events won / competed); (W–L) win–loss record.
To avoid confusion and double counting, these charts are updated at the conclusion of a tournament or when the player's participation has ended.

==== Singles ====
Tournament	2017	2018	2019	2020	2021	2022	2023	2024	2025	2026	SR	W–L	Win %
Australian Open	Q2	1R	3R	1R	4R	4R	**W**	**W**	F	F	2 / 9	34–7	83%
French Open	Q1	1R	2R	3R	3R	3R	SF	QF	F	QF	0 / 9	26–9	74%
Wimbledon	2R	1R	1R	NH	SF	A (Note: Suspended due to the ban of Russian and Belarusian athletes in light of the Russian invasion of Ukraine.)	SF	A	SF	4R	0 / 7	19–7	73%
US Open	Q1	4R	2R	2R	SF	SF	F	**W**	**W**	F	2 / 9	40–7	85%
**Win–loss**	**1–1**	**3–4**	**4–4**	**3–3**	**15–4**	**10–3**	**23–3**	**18–1**	**24–3**	**19–4**	**4 / 34**	**119–30**	**80%**

==== Doubles ====
Tournament	2018	2019	2020	2021	SR	W–L	Win %
Australian Open	1R	3R	QF	**W**	1 / 4	10–3	77%
French Open	A	SF	2R	A	0 / 2	5–2	71%
Wimbledon	2R	QF	NH	A	0 / 2	4–2	67%
US Open	3R	**W**	QF	A	1 / 3	10–2	83%
**Win–loss**	**3–3**	**15–3**	**6–3**	**5–0**	**2 / 11**	**29–9**	**76%**

=== Grand Slam tournament finals ===
==== Singles: 9 (4 titles, 5 runner-ups) ====
Result	Year	Tournament	Surface	Opponent	Score
Win	2023	Australian Open	Hard	(Kazakhstan) Elena Rybakina	4–6, 6–3, 6–4
Loss	2023	US Open	Hard	(United States) Coco Gauff	6–2, 3–6, 2–6
Win	2024	Australian Open (2)	Hard	(China) Zheng Qinwen	6–3, 6–2
Win	2024	US Open	Hard	(United States) Jessica Pegula	7–5, 7–5
Loss	2025	Australian Open	Hard	(United States) Madison Keys	3–6, 6–2, 5–7
Loss	2025	French Open	Clay	(United States) Coco Gauff	7–6^{(7–5)}, 2–6, 4–6
Win	2025	US Open (2)	Hard	(United States) Amanda Anisimova	6–3, 7–6^{(7–3)}
Loss	2026	Australian Open	Hard	(Kazakhstan) Elena Rybakina	4–6, 6–4, 4–6
Loss	2026	US Open	Hard	(Kazakhstan) Elena Rybakina	4–6, 7–5, 2–6

==== Doubles: 2 (2 titles) ====
Result	Year	Tournament	Surface	Partner	Opponents	Score
Win	2019	US Open	Hard	(Belgium) Elise Mertens	(Belarus) Victoria Azarenka (Australia) Ashleigh Barty	7–5, 7–5
Win	2021	Australian Open	Hard	(Belgium) Elise Mertens	(Czech Republic) Barbora Krejčíková (Czech Republic) Kateřina Siniaková	6–2, 6–3

=== Year-end championship finals ===
==== Singles: 2 (2 runner-ups) ====
Result	Year	Tournament	Surface	Opponent	Score
Loss	2022	WTA Finals	Hard (i)	(France) Caroline Garcia	6–7^{(4–7)}, 4–6
Loss	2025	WTA Finals	Hard (i)	(Kazakhstan) Elena Rybakina	3–6, 6–7^{(0–7)}

=== Records and achievements ===
==== Open Era records ====
- This record was attained in the Open Era of tennis.
- Records in **bold** indicate peer-less achievements.

Tournament	Year accomplished	Since	Record accomplished	Players matched	Reference(s)
WTA Tour	2024	2010	Players to complete Cincinnati Open–US Open double	Kim Clijsters, Serena Williams, Coco Gauff	
WTA Tour	2026	1996	Players to complete the Sunshine Double	Steffi Graf, Kim Clijsters, Victoria Azarenka, Iga Świątek	
WTA Tour	2026	2026	Players to complete the Sunshine Double in both singles (2026) and doubles (2019)	**Stands alone**	
WTA Tour	2026	1975	Conceded 6–0 deciding sets at multiple and consecutive WTA-level events while ranked No. 1	**Stands alone**	
Grand Slam events	2024	1988	Won both the Australian Open and US Open in the same calendar year	Steffi Graf, Monica Seles, Martina Hingis, Angelique Kerber, Elena Rybakina	
Grand Slam events	2023-26	1969	Most consecutive Grand Slam finals on hard court (8)	**Stands alone**	
Australian Open	2024	1997	Won the Australian Open without dropping a set	Ashleigh Barty, Serena Williams, Maria Sharapova, Lindsay Davenport, Martina Hingis	
Wuhan Open	2024	2024	Won three consecutive Wuhan Open titles (2018, 2019, and 2024)	**Stands Alone**	

== Notes ==
Sporting positions
Preceded by Iga Świątek; Iga Świątek	World No. 1; 11 September 2023 – 5 November 2023; 21 October 2024 –	Succeeded by Iga Świątek; Incumbent
Preceded by Iga Świątek	ITF World Champion; 2023	Succeeded by Iga Świątek
