= Anton Dubrov =

Belarusian tennis coach (born 1995)

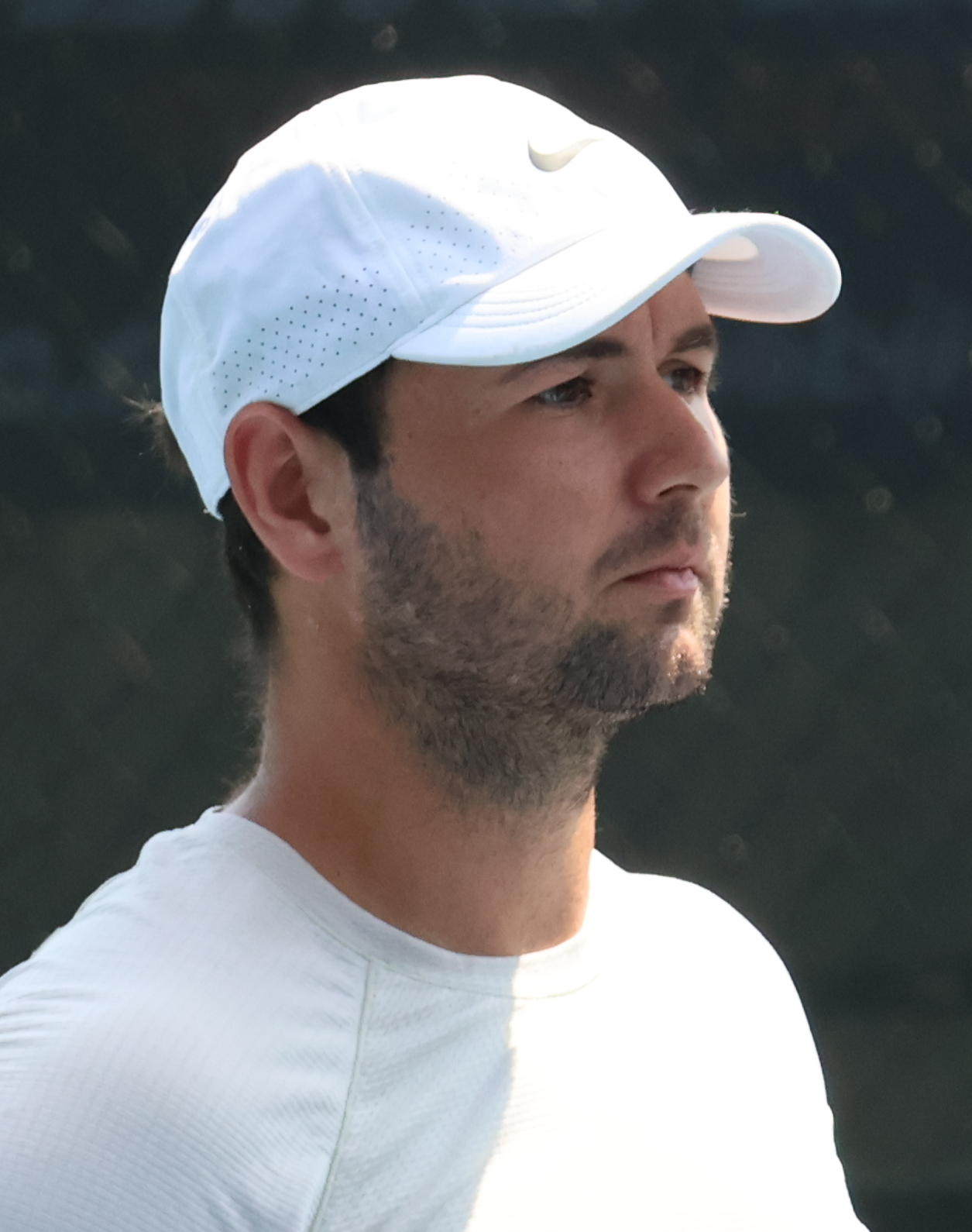
- Dubrov in 2024
- Native name: Антон Дуброў
- Country (sports): Belarus
- Born: 18 June 1995 (age 30) Belarus
- Turned pro: 2013
- Retired: 2018
- Plays: Right-handed
- Prize money: $2,016

Singles
- Highest ranking: No. 1935 (3 November 2014)

Coaching career
- Aryna Sabalenka (2020–)

Coaching achievements
- Coachee singles titles total: 18
- List of notable tournaments (with champion): 2023 Australian Open (Sabalenka); 2024 Australian Open (Sabalenka); 2024 US Open (Sabalenka); 2025 US Open (Sabalenka); 8x WTA 1000 (Sabalenka)

Anton Dubrov (Belarusian: Антон Дуброў; Russian: Антон Дубров; born 18 June 1995) is a Belarusian tennis coach. He has coached Women's Tennis Association (WTA) player Aryna Sabalenka since 2020. With Dubrov as her coach, Sabalenka became the world No. 1 in women's singles and has won 18 WTA Tour-level singles titles, including four majors at the 2023 Australian Open, 2024 Australian Open, 2024 US Open, and 2025 US Open.

== Playing career ==
Dubrov started playing tennis at age five. His peak International Tennis Federation (ITF) junior ranking was No. 272, reached in 2013. Over the course of his playing career, he earned a single Association of Tennis Professionals (ATP) ranking point by winning just one out of his ten main-draw singles matches on the ITF Men's Circuit from 2013 to 2015, but continued occasionally to enter ITF qualifying draws until 2018.

== Coaching career ==
Dubrov was Aryna Sabalenka's longtime hitting partner before becoming her primary coach in 2020, replacing longtime coach Dmitry Tursunov after a stint with Dieter Kindlmann. Sabalenka, then ranked just outside the WTA's top 10, found increasingly consistent results with Dubrov, winning four WTA Tour titles in the first year of his coaching tenure. Ranked world No. 2 at the end of 2021, she credited him with helping her feel more "confident" in her game, offering feedback "in a nice way".

In February 2022, as Sabalenka resisted her team's efforts to rework her serve while having high-profile trouble with double faults, Dubrov offered to resign, but Sabalenka convinced him to stay on, promising that "we'll come back stronger". An expert in biomechanics was brought in to help fix her serve in August 2022, and after winning her first Major singles title at the 2023 Australian Open, she thanked her "craziest team on tour" of Dubrov and fitness trainer Jason Stacy for supporting her over a tumultuous previous year.
