= 2023 French Open =

2023 tennis tournament held in Paris, France

- Date: 28 May – 11 June 2023
- Edition: 122
- Category: Grand Slam
- Draw: 128S / 64D / 32X
- Prize money: €49,600,000
- Surface: Clay
- Location: Paris (XVI^{e}), France
- Venue: Roland Garros Stadium

Champions

Men's singles
- (Serbia) Novak Djokovic

Women's singles
- (Poland) Iga Świątek

Men's doubles
- (Croatia) Ivan Dodig / (United States) Austin Krajicek

Women's doubles
- (Chinese Taipei) Hsieh Su-wei / (China) Wang Xinyu

Mixed doubles
- (Japan) Miyu Kato / (Germany) Tim Pütz

Wheelchair men's singles
- (Japan) Tokito Oda

Wheelchair women's singles
- (Netherlands) Diede de Groot

Wheelchair quad singles
- (Netherlands) Niels Vink

Wheelchair men's doubles
- (United Kingdom) Alfie Hewett / (United Kingdom) Gordon Reid

Wheelchair women's doubles
- (Japan) Yui Kamiji / (South Africa) Kgothatso Montjane

Wheelchair quad doubles
- (United Kingdom) Andy Lapthorne / (South Africa) Donald Ramphadi

Boys' singles
- (Croatia) Dino Prižmić

Girls' singles
- Alina Korneeva

Boys' doubles
- Yaroslav Demin / (Mexico) Rodrigo Pacheco Méndez

Girls' doubles
- (United States) Tyra Caterina Grant / (United States) Clervie Ngounoue
- French Open

The 2023 French Open was a Grand Slam tennis tournament played on outdoor clay courts. It was held at the Stade Roland Garros in Paris, France, from 28 May to 11 June 2023, comprising singles, doubles and mixed doubles play. Junior and wheelchair tournaments were also played. It was the 122nd edition of the French Open and the second Grand Slam tournament of 2023.

== Singles players ==
- Men's singles

Champion		Runner-up	
(Serbia) Novak Djokovic [3]		(Norway) Casper Ruud [4]	
Semifinals out
(Spain) Carlos Alcaraz [1]		(Germany) Alexander Zverev [22]	
Quarterfinals out
(Greece) Stefanos Tsitsipas [5]	Karen Khachanov [11]	(Denmark) Holger Rune [6]	(Argentina) Tomás Martín Etcheverry
4th round out
(Italy) Lorenzo Musetti [17]	(Austria) Sebastian Ofner (Q)	(Peru) Juan Pablo Varillas	(Italy) Lorenzo Sonego
(Argentina) Francisco Cerúndolo [23]	(Chile) Nicolás Jarry	(Bulgaria) Grigor Dimitrov [28]	(Japan) Yoshihito Nishioka [27]
3rd round out
(Canada) Denis Shapovalov [26]	(United Kingdom) Cameron Norrie [14]	(Italy) Fabio Fognini	(Argentina) Diego Schwartzman
(Spain) Alejandro Davidovich Fokina [29]	(Poland) Hubert Hurkacz [13]	(Australia) Thanasi Kokkinakis (WC)	Andrey Rublev [7]
(Argentina) Genaro Alberto Olivieri (Q)	(United States) Taylor Fritz [9]	(United States) Marcos Giron	(China) Zhang Zhizhen
(Germany) Daniel Altmaier	(United States) Frances Tiafoe [12]	(Croatia) Borna Ćorić [15]	(Brazil) Thiago Seyboth Wild (Q)
2nd round out
(Japan) Taro Daniel	(Italy) Matteo Arnaldi	Alexander Shevchenko	(France) Lucas Pouille (Q)
(Australia) Jason Kubler	(United States) Sebastian Korda [24]	(Portugal) Nuno Borges	(Spain) Roberto Carballés Baena
(Hungary) Márton Fucsovics	(France) Luca Van Assche	(Spain) Roberto Bautista Agut [19]	(Netherlands) Tallon Griekspoor
(Moldova) Radu Albot (Q)	(Switzerland) Stan Wawrinka	(France) Ugo Humbert	(France) Corentin Moutet
(France) Gaël Monfils (PR)	(Italy) Andrea Vavassori (Q)	(Germany) Yannick Hanfmann(LL)	(France) Arthur Rinderknech
(United States) Tommy Paul [16]	(Czech Republic) Jiří Lehečka	(Argentina) Thiago Agustín Tirante (Q)	(Italy) Giulio Zeppieri (Q)
(Italy) Jannik Sinner [8]	(Finland) Emil Ruusuvuori	(Slovakia) Alex Molčan	Aslan Karatsev (Q)
(Argentina) Pedro Cachin	(Australia) Alex de Minaur [18]	(Australia) Max Purcell	(Argentina) Guido Pella (PR)
1st round out
(Italy) Flavio Cobolli (Q)	(Australia) Christopher O'Connell	(Colombia) Daniel Elahi Galán	(United States) Brandon Nakashima
(Sweden) Mikael Ymer	(Germany) Oscar Otte	(Austria) Jurij Rodionov (LL)	(France) Benoît Paire (WC)
(Canada) Félix Auger-Aliassime [10]	(Argentina) Facundo Díaz Acosta (LL)	(United States) Maxime Cressy	(United States) Mackenzie McDonald
(Spain) Bernabé Zapata Miralles [32]	(United States) John Isner	(United States) Emilio Nava (Q)	(Czech Republic) Jiří Veselý (PR)
(United States) Aleksandar Kovacevic	(France) Hugo Grenier (WC)	(Italy) Marco Cecchinato	(France) Arthur Fils (WC)
(China) Wu Yibing	(China) Shang Juncheng (Q)	(Spain) Pedro Martínez (Q)	(Belgium) David Goffin
(France) Constant Lestienne	(United States) Patrick Kypson (WC)	(Spain) Albert Ramos Viñolas	(United Kingdom) Dan Evans [20]
(United States) Ben Shelton [30]	(France) Adrian Mannarino	(France) Arthur Cazaux (WC)	(Serbia) Laslo Djere
(United States) Christopher Eubanks	(Argentina) Sebastián Báez	(France) Giovanni Mpetshi Perricard (WC)	(Serbia) Miomir Kecmanović [31]
(Spain) Jaume Munar	(Brazil) Thiago Monteiro	(France) Richard Gasquet	(United States) Michael Mmoh
(Switzerland) Dominic Stricker (LL)	(Bolivia) Hugo Dellien (PR)	(Serbia) Hamad Međedović (Q)	(Germany) Jan-Lennard Struff [21]
(Netherlands) Botic van de Zandschulp [25]	(Serbia) Dušan Lajović	(Kazakhstan) Alexander Bublik	(Sweden) Elias Ymer (Q)
(France) Alexandre Müller	(Switzerland) Marc-Andrea Hüsler	(France) Grégoire Barrère	(Kazakhstan) Timofey Skatov (Q)
(South Africa) Lloyd Harris (PR)	(France) Hugo Gaston (WC)	(Australia) Alexei Popyrin	(Serbia) Filip Krajinović
(Argentina) Federico Coria	(Austria) Dominic Thiem	(United Kingdom) Jack Draper	Ilya Ivashka
(United States) J. J. Wolf	(Australia) Jordan Thompson	(France) Quentin Halys	Daniil Medvedev [2]

- Women's singles

Champion		Runner-up	
(Poland) Iga Świątek [1]		(Czech Republic) Karolína Muchová	
Semifinals out
(Brazil) Beatriz Haddad Maia [14]		Aryna Sabalenka [2]	
Quarterfinals out
(United States) Coco Gauff [6]	(Tunisia) Ons Jabeur [7]	Anastasia Pavlyuchenkova (PR)	(Ukraine) Elina Svitolina (PR)
4th round out
(Ukraine) Lesia Tsurenko	(Slovakia) Anna Karolína Schmiedlová	(Spain) Sara Sorribes Tormo (PR)	(United States) Bernarda Pera
Elina Avanesyan (LL)	(Belgium) Elise Mertens [28]	Daria Kasatkina [9]	(United States) Sloane Stephens
3rd round out
(China) Wang Xinyu	(Canada) Bianca Andreescu	(United States) Kayla Day (Q)	Mirra Andreeva (Q)
(Kazakhstan) Elena Rybakina [4]	Ekaterina Alexandrova [23]	(Italy) Elisabetta Cocciaretto	(Serbia) Olga Danilović (Q)
(Romania) Irina-Camelia Begu [27]	(Denmark) Clara Tauson (Q)	Anastasia Potapova [24]	(United States) Jessica Pegula [3]
Anna Blinkova	(United States) Peyton Stearns	(Kazakhstan) Yulia Putintseva	Kamilla Rakhimova
2nd round out
(United States) Claire Liu	(Sweden) Rebecca Peterson	(United States) Emma Navarro (WC)	(United States) Lauren Davis
(Spain) Aliona Bolsova (LL)	(United States) Madison Keys [20]	(France) Diane Parry (WC)	(Austria) Julia Grabher
(Czech Republic) Linda Nosková	(Croatia) Petra Martić	(Germany) Anna-Lena Friedsam	Diana Shnaider
(Switzerland) Simona Waltert (Q)	(Croatia) Donna Vekić [22]	(Italy) Jasmine Paolini	(France) Océane Dodin
(Argentina) Nadia Podoroska	(Italy) Sara Errani	(Canada) Leylah Fernandez	(France) Léolia Jeanjean (WC)
Liudmila Samsonova [15]	(Egypt) Mayar Sherif	(Colombia) Camila Osorio (LL)	(Italy) Camila Giorgi
(France) Caroline Garcia [5]	(Australia) Storm Hunter (Q)	(Latvia) Jeļena Ostapenko [17]	(Czech Republic) Markéta Vondroušová
Varvara Gracheva	(China) Zheng Qinwen [19]	(Poland) Magdalena Fręch	Iryna Shymanovich (Q)
1st round out
(Spain) Cristina Bucșa	(Switzerland) Ylena In-Albon (Q)	(France) Fiona Ferro (Q)	(Czech Republic) Marie Bouzková [31]
Victoria Azarenka [18]	Erika Andreeva (LL)	(China) Zhu Lin	(Czech Republic) Barbora Krejčíková [13]
Veronika Kudermetova [11]	(Slovakia) Kristína Kučová (PR)	(France) Kristina Mladenovic (WC)	(Estonia) Kaia Kanepi
(Ukraine) Anhelina Kalinina [25]	(United States) Alison Riske-Amritraj	(Netherlands) Arantxa Rus (Q)	(Spain) Rebeka Masarova
(Czech Republic) Brenda Fruhvirtová (Q)	(Montenegro) Danka Kovinić	(France) Clara Burel (WC)	(United States) Shelby Rogers [32]
(Bulgaria) Viktoriya Tomova	(Japan) Nao Hibino (LL)	(Canada) Rebecca Marino	(Germany) Tatjana Maria
(Czech Republic) Petra Kvitová [10]	(United States) Elizabeth Mandlik (Q)	(Estonia) Anett Kontaveit	(Ukraine) Dayana Yastremska (Q)
(Romania) Sorana Cîrstea [30]	(Ukraine) Kateryna Baindl	(France) Séléna Janicijevic (WC)	(Italy) Lucia Bronzetti
(Greece) Maria Sakkari [8]	(France) Jessika Ponchet (WC)	(Switzerland) Jil Teichmann	(Hungary) Anna Bondár
(Poland) Magda Linette [21]	Aliaksandra Sasnovich	(Australia) Kimberly Birrell (WC)	(Switzerland) Belinda Bencic [12]
(United States) Katie Volynets	(Czech Republic) Linda Fruhvirtová	(United States) Madison Brengle	(United States) Taylor Townsend (Q)
(Slovakia) Viktória Hrunčáková (LL)	(Romania) Ana Bogdan	(France) Alizé Cornet	(United States) Danielle Collins
(China) Wang Xiyu	(Belgium) Ysaline Bonaventure	(Spain) Nuria Párrizas Díaz	(Italy) Martina Trevisan [26]
(Czech Republic) Tereza Martincová	(Czech Republic) Kateřina Siniaková	(United States) Alycia Parks	(Germany) Jule Niemeier
(Czech Republic) Karolína Plíšková [16]	(Hungary) Dalma Gálfi	(Belgium) Maryna Zanevska	(Slovenia) Tamara Zidanšek (Q)
(China) Zhang Shuai [29]	(Czech Republic) Sára Bejlek (Q)	(Hungary) Panna Udvardy	(Ukraine) Marta Kostyuk

== Events ==
=== Men's singles ===
- (Serbia) Novak Djokovic def. (Norway) Casper Ruud, 7–6^{(7–1)}, 6–3, 7–5

=== Women's singles ===
- (Poland) Iga Świątek def. (Czech Republic) Karolína Muchová, 6–2, 5–7, 6–4

=== Men's doubles ===
- (Croatia) Ivan Dodig / (United States) Austin Krajicek def. (Belgium) Sander Gillé / (Belgium) Joran Vliegen, 6–3, 6–1

=== Women's doubles ===
- (Chinese Taipei) Hsieh Su-wei / (China) Wang Xinyu def. (Canada) Leylah Fernandez / (United States) Taylor Townsend, 1–6, 7–6^{(7–5)}, 6–1

=== Mixed doubles ===
- (Japan) Miyu Kato / (Germany) Tim Pütz def. (Canada) Bianca Andreescu / (New Zealand) Michael Venus, 4–6, 6–4, [10–6]

=== Wheelchair men's singles ===
- (Japan) Tokito Oda def. (United Kingdom) Alfie Hewett, 6–1, 6–4

=== Wheelchair women's singles ===
- (Netherlands) Diede de Groot def. (Japan) Yui Kamiji, 6–2, 6–0

=== Wheelchair quad singles ===
- (Netherlands) Niels Vink def. (Netherlands) Sam Schröder, 3–6, 6–4, 6–4

=== Wheelchair men's doubles ===
- (United Kingdom) Alfie Hewett / (United Kingdom) Gordon Reid def. (Spain) Martín de la Puente / (Argentina) Gustavo Fernández, 7–6^{(11–9)}, 7–5

=== Wheelchair women's doubles ===
- (Japan) Yui Kamiji / (South Africa) Kgothatso Montjane def. (Netherlands) Diede de Groot / (Argentina) María Florencia Moreno, 6–2, 6–3

=== Wheelchair quad doubles ===
- (United Kingdom) Andy Lapthorne / (South Africa) Donald Ramphadi def. (Australia) Heath Davidson / (Canada) Robert Shaw, 1–6, 6–2, [10–3]

=== Boys' singles ===
- (Croatia) Dino Prižmić def. (Bolivia) Juan Carlos Prado Ángelo, 6–1, 6–4

=== Girls' singles ===
- Alina Korneeva def. (Peru) Lucciana Pérez Alarcón, 7–6^{(7–4)}, 6–3

=== Boys' doubles ===
- Yaroslav Demin / (Mexico) Rodrigo Pacheco Méndez def. (Italy) Lorenzo Sciahbasi / (Italy) Gabriele Vulpitta, 6–2, 6–3

=== Girls' doubles ===
- (United States) Tyra Caterina Grant / (United States) Clervie Ngounoue def. Alina Korneeva / (Japan) Sara Saito, 6–3, 6–2

== Point distribution and prize money ==
=== Point distribution ===
As a Grand Slam tournament, the points for the French Open are the highest of all ATP and WTA tournaments. These points determine the world ATP and WTA rankings for men's and women's competition, respectively. In both singles and doubles, women received slightly higher point totals compared to their male counterparts at each round of the tournament, except for the first and last. Points and rankings for the wheelchair events fall under the jurisdiction of the ITF Wheelchair Tennis Tour, which also places Grand Slams as the highest classification.

Below is a series of tables for each of the competitions showing the ranking points on offer for each event:

==== Senior events ====
Event	Winner	Finalist	Semifinals	Quarterfinals	Round of 16	Round of 32	Round of 64	Round of 128
Men's singles	2000	1200	720	360	180	90	45	10
Men's doubles	2000	1200	720	360	180	90	0	—
Women's singles	2000	1300	780	430	240	130	70	10
Women's doubles	2000	1300	780	430	240	130	10	—

==== Wheelchair events ====
Event	Winner	Finalist	Semifinals	Quarterfinals
Singles	800	500	375	100
Quad singles	800	500	375 / 100	–
Doubles	800	500	100	—
Quad doubles	800	100	—	—

=== Prize money ===
The French Open total prize money for 2023 is €49,600,000, an increase of 12.3% compared to 2022. The French Tennis Federation aimed for a more even distribution of remuneration between players and significantly increased the prize money for first-round losers in the women’s and men’s singles draws and the amounts awarded in the qualifying, wheelchair tennis and quad competitions.

Event	W	F	SF	QF	Round of 16	Round of 32	Round of 64	Round of 128^{1}	Q3	Q2	Q1
Singles	€2,300,000	€1,150,000	€630,000	€400,000	€240,000	€142,000	€97,000	€69,000	€34,000	€22,000	€16,000
Doubles *	€590,000	€295,000	€148,000	€80,000	€43,000	€27,000	€17,000	—N/a	—N/a	—N/a	—N/a
Mixed Doubles *	€122,000	€61,000	€31,000	€17,500	€10,000	€5,000	—N/a	—N/a	—N/a	—N/a	—N/a
Wheelchair Singles	€60,000	€30,000	€18,000	€11,000	€8,000	—N/a	—N/a	—N/a	—N/a	—N/a	—N/a
Wheelchair Doubles *	€20,000	€10,000	€7,000	€5,000	—N/a	—N/a	—N/a	—N/a	—N/a	—N/a	—N/a
Quad Singles	€60,000	€30,000	€18,000	€11,000	—N/a	—N/a	—N/a	—N/a	—N/a	—N/a	—N/a
Quad Doubles *	€20,000	€10,000	€7,000	—N/a	—N/a	—N/a	—N/a	—N/a	—N/a	—N/a	—N/a

*per team

== Controversies ==
Miyu Kato and Aldila Sutjiadi were disqualified from the tournament after Kato accidentally hit a ballgirl with a ball during their doubles match. The incident sparked controversy and criticism of Marie Bouzková and Sara Sorribes Tormo, who argued for the disqualification. Kato hit a one-handed backhand that unintentionally struck the ballgirl, causing her discomfort and tears. Despite Kato's immediate apology and the umpire's warning, Bouzková and Sorribes Tormo insisted on the disqualification. After a consultation with officials, Kato and Sutjiadi were defaulted, leading to emotional scenes on the court. The heavy punishment received surprise and backlash from viewers and tennis commentators. Former player Gilles Simon criticized Bouzková and Sorribes Tormo's actions, while some suggested they should also face consequences. The incident drew widespread attention and sparked debates about sportsmanship in tennis. Kato issued an apology, expressing remorse for the unintended mishap.

Belarusian player Aryna Sabalenka skipped her third- and fourth-round mandatory press conferences, saying she "did not feel safe" answering questions about her views on the Russian invasion which had been asked by Ukrainian journalist Daria Meshcheriakova. Unlike Naomi Osaka two years prior, Sabalenka was not fined and was allowed to do her next interviews with just a WTA employee.

During the trophy presentation, Ivan Dodig, a four-time Roland Garros champion, expressed his disappointment with the French Open organizers, stating that he was not treated like every athlete should be. Dodig claimed that he had traveled by taxi for 15 days, often experiencing delays and feeling like a tourist in Paris. He emphasized the importance of treating all players equally in order to maintain fair competition. In response to Dodig's criticism, tournament director Amelie Mauresmo considered his language "unacceptable" and sought to clarify the situation. Mauresmo pointed out that there were numerous hotels within a three-mile radius of the venue and that any player could book transportation within a five-kilometer range. She mentioned that Dodig had chosen a hotel in a different part of Paris, far from the tournament site, but alternative options were offered to him. However, Mauresmo explained that the organizers aimed to prioritize environmental sustainability and had limited resources, including a conscious approach to transportation.

Preceded by 2022 French Open	French Open	Succeeded by 2024 French Open
Preceded by 2023 Australian Open	Grand Slam events	Succeeded by 2023 Wimbledon Championships
