= Tribuna.com =

Digital sports publisher

- Type: Online sports publisher
- Founder(s): Maksim Berezinskiy, Dmitriy Navosha
- Editor-in-chief: Oleg Gorunovich (Belarusian edition); Oleg Shcherbakov (Ukrainian edition); Oleksandr Manov (International edition)
- Staff writers: 150
- Founded: 2010
- Language: Belarusian, Ukrainian, Russian, English, Spanish, French, Italian, German, Arabic
- Country: Ukraine, Belarus
- Website: tribuna.com, ua.tribuna.com, by.tribuna.com, de.tribuna.com, es.tribuna.com, fr.tribuna.com, it.tribuna.com, ar.tribuna.com

Tribuna.com, also known as Tribuna, is an international online sports publisher. It was founded in 2010. The portal covers sports events in nine languages, including Belarusian, Ukrainian, and international editions. In addition to publishing news, Tribuna develops sports applications and maintains an extensive network of social media groups.

Following the 2020 presidential elections, the outlet and its staff faced persecution within Belarus. After the outbreak of the full-scale war in Ukraine, Tribuna supported humanitarian initiatives and launched campaigns in support of Ukrainian sports.

== History ==
In 2010, sports resource Goals.by was registered. In 2014, it merged with sports website Sports.ru, retaining the editorial staff and moving to a new platform. Since then, the editorial staff started working under the Tribuna brand. In early 2020, Sports.ru was sold while the Ukrainian, Belarusian and international Tribuna remained in the hands of their founders.

The company have more than 150 employees from over 30 countries. Almost 30 of them work in the Ukrainian editorial team. About two-thirds of the team are engaged in editorial work, the rest in application development and product management.

In addition to Ukrainian language, Tribuna also operates in Arabic, Belarusian, English, French, German, Italian, Russian and Spanish. In each of the European countries, the audience of the language sections reaches one million people.

Prior to the outbreak of the full-scale war in Ukraine, the company followed an advertising revenue model, but have been forced to revise their strategy in favour of premium subscriptions and affiliate marketing.

== Editorial teams ==
=== International (tribuna.com) ===
The international edition was launched in 2010 and employs over 50 journalists. In 2014, the publisher released the first international application – live-score football app. Soon, the first club apps about the most popular European teams were released: Barcelona, Real Madrid, Liverpool, Chelsea, Manchester United, Bayern Munich, AC Milan and others. By October 2024, these apps were downloaded more than 5 million times. The publisher's social media accounts have over 15 million followers, with the Barcelona blog boasting over three million followers.

=== Belarusian (by.tribuna.com) ===
In 2014, sports website Goals.by merged with Tribuna Digital and started operating under the address by.tribuna.com. In 2018, the source ranked 9th among Belarusian online media sources and became the most popular web sports publisher in Belarus.

In 2019, Tribuna's audience reached 700 thousand monthly views. Every Sunday, the publisher was making posts in Belarusian language. Despite being blocked in 2020, the publisher remained profitable, but after it was recognised extremist in 2021, it was forced to part ways with advertisers. Since the block, Tribuna continued to be the most popular sports publisher in Belarus.

With the outbreak of a full-scale war in Ukraine, the editorial staff were forced to leave Ukraine where they were located after having to leave Belarus. On October 6, 2022, the general director of Tribuna, Dmitriy Navosha, announced the publisher would switch to the Belarusian language. This decision was positively received by the editorial staff, media and users. The Belarusian-language version was consistently reaching 38-40 per cent of all views.

==== Political persecution ====
During the presidential election on August 9, 2020, the publisher's website was blocked. On August 6, 2021, Belarusian court declared the sports website extremist. This decision was made on the petition of the Ministry of Internal Affairs who accused the publisher of ‘posting materials calling for extremist activity’. In addition, the website mirrors, the app and their bot were recognised as extremist. During this time, the publisher's employees were repeatedly detained while some of them were searched. After the arrest of journalist Alexander Ivulin on June 3, 2021, the entire editorial staff were forced to leave the country for Ukraine. On September 1, 2021, a search was conducted in the apartment previously occupied by the outlet's director, Maksim Berezinski. On January 18, 2023, the founder of Tribuna, Dmitriy Navosha, was sentenced in absentia to 12 years in a penal colony. On December 5, 2023, the publisher was recognised as an extremist formation.

=== Ukrainian (ua.tribuna.com) ===
The Ukrainian website version was launched in 2013.

In 2019, the Ukrainian Tribuna website had 1.3 million monthly users. Before the outbreak of the full-scale war, the project's audience grew to 6 million readers per month. Although the publisher remained profitable, all advertising campaigns were suspended after the full-scale Russian invasion.

The number of views and the audience size decreased fourfold. However, after the liberation of Kyiv, Kharkiv, Sumy and Chernihiv regions, the number of users began to gradually recover. In August–September 2022, the audience were almost back to pre-war levels, reaching about 5 million readers per month.

==== Editorial initiatives during the war ====
At the beginning of the war, the website launched the NFT collection ‘Sports For Ukraine’, elements of which could be purchased to support the country and those affected by Russian aggression. Such famous sportsmen as Andriy Shevchenko, Oleksandr Zinchenko, Robert Lewandowski, Zhan Beleniuk and others took part in the initiative. In addition, since the beginning of the war, the publisher has actively supported charitable initiatives, thanks to which it managed to raise hundreds of thousands of dollars for various humanitarian projects.

On October 6, 2022, the Ukrainian Tribuna, together with media group ‘1+1’ and with the support of the Ministry of Youth and Sports of Ukraine announced the launch of the project ‘Sports Front’. The aim of co-operation between the two was to support Ukrainian sport, boycotting athletes who either did not express their position on the war or openly supported Russian aggressors. In addition, the project was aimed at drawing the attention of the world community to the need to ban the participation of Russian and Belarusian teams in international competitions. On November 24, 2022, the Verkhovna Rada of Ukraine instructed Tribuna's editorial board to compile a sanctions list of athletes from Russia and Belarus who publicly supported the Russian-Ukrainian war.
