= 2019 Bianca Andreescu tennis season =

2019 tennis season about Canadian player Bianca Andreescu

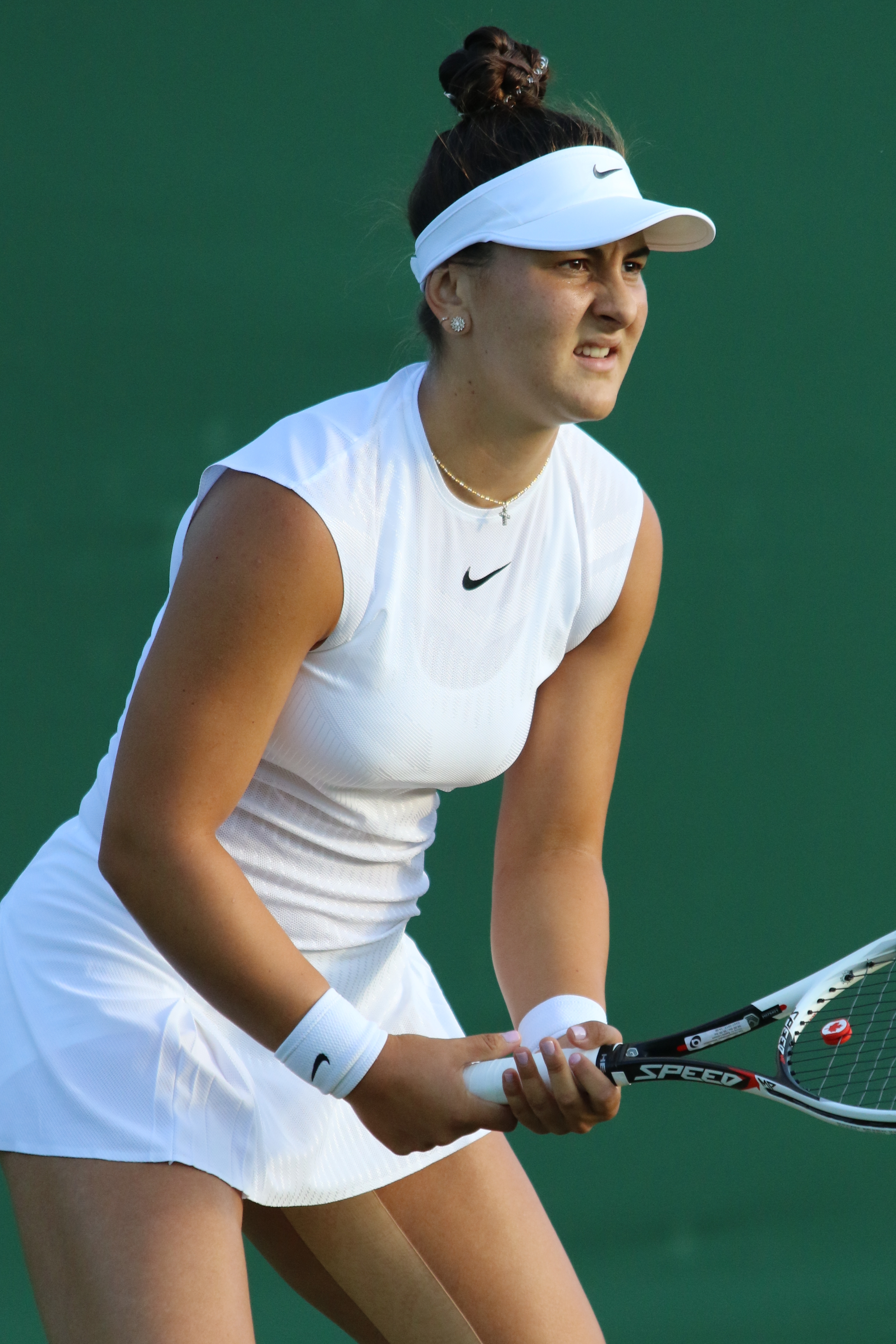
- Andreescu playing at the 2017 Wimbledon Championships
- Full name: Bianca Andreescu
- Country: Canada
- Calendar prize money: $6,239,150

Singles
- Season record: 48–7
- Calendar titles: 4
- Year-end ranking: No. 5
- Ranking change from previous year: ▲147

Grand Slam & significant results
- Australian Open: 2R
- French Open: 2R
- Wimbledon: A
- US Open: W

Doubles
- Season record: 0–1
- Calendar titles: 0
- Year-end ranking: No. 1217
- Ranking change from previous year: ▼676

Grand Slam doubles results
- Australian Open: A
- French Open: A
- Wimbledon: A
- US Open: 1R

Grand Slam mixed doubles results
- Injuries: Right shoulder injury Knee injury
- Last updated on: 2 November 2019.

The 2019 Bianca Andreescu tennis season officially began on December 31, 2018 with the start of the 2019 WTA Tour. She entered the season as No. 152 in the world.

== Year in detail ==
=== Early hard court season ===
==== Auckland Open ====
Andreescu started her season at the Auckland Open, where she qualified for the main draw after beating Kristína Kučová, Jaimee Fourlis and Laura Siegemund. In the main draw, she made it to the final after defeating four top-30 players, including two former World No. 1 players, Caroline Wozniacki and Venus Williams. However, she lost to defending champion Julia Görges in three sets.

==== Australian Open ====
In Melbourne, Andreescu successfully progressed through qualifying to enter the main draw. She then beat Whitney Osuigwe before losing in the second round to Anastasija Sevastova in three sets.

==== Newport Beach ====
Andreescu played at the Newport Beach, where she was the sixth seed. Having received a bye in the first round, she then won the next five matches and secured her first ever WTA 125K series title, which elevated herself to the World No. 68.

==== Mexican Open ====
In February, Andreescu played the Mexican Open, where she got to the semi-finals, losing to No. 5 seed Sofia Kenin in three sets. Nevertheless, her ranking climbed to a career-high 60.

=== March sunshine events ===
==== Indian Wells Open ====
This year's Indian Wells Premier Mandatory event proved to be her breakout event. By reaching the semi-finals, Andreescu became the third wild card to reach the semi-finals of the tournament, joining Grand Slam champions Serena Williams and Kim Clijsters. She then defeated two then top-ten players, Elina Svitolina and Angelique Kerber, to win her first WTA title. The victory also promoted the 19-year-old rising star to a new-career high ranking of 24.

==== Miami Open ====
Several days later, Andreescu drew Begu in the first round again in Miami. She managed to save a match point and eventually won the match to reach the second round. In the second round, she avenged her Acapulco loss to Kenin to set up another meeting with Kerber. She upset Kerber in three sets once again, but she had to retire against Anett Kontaveit due to a right shoulder injury, ending her 10-match winning streak.

=== European clay court season ===
==== French Open ====
After a three-month-long recovery, Andreescu returned to the tennis court at the French Open, as the 22nd seed. However, she retired before her second round match against Kenin. She missed the entire grass-court season to recover from her shoulder injury.

=== US Open series ===
==== Rogers Cup ====
Andreescu came back two months later in her home tournament, the 2019 Rogers Cup in Toronto, where she made to her third WTA final after defeating two former top-ten players, Eugenie Bouchard and Daria Kasatkina, and two then top-ten players, Kiki Bertens and Karolína Plíšková, all in three sets. In the semi-finals, she met Kenin for the third time this season, and successfully upset the American in two straight sets. Her final rival was the 23-time Grand Slam winner Serena Williams, but a tearful Williams retired when she was 1–3 down in the first set due to her own injury. This gave Bianca her second WTA title, and a career-high ranking of 14.

==== US Open ====
Two weeks later, she was seeded 15th in the US Open. She made it to the second week of a Grand Slam without losing a set. In the fourth round, she outlasted local player Taylor Townsend to make her first quarter-final appearance in a Grand Slam. After downing Elise Mertens in three tough sets, she upset Belinda Bencic in two sets to reach her first Grand Slam final, where she faced Serena Williams once again. Andreescu beat Serena in straight sets, becoming the first Canadian to win a Grand Slam singles title, the first woman to win the US Open in her main draw debut (she previously lost in a qualifying round), and the first player born after 2000 to win a Grand Slam tournament. With the 2,000 points she won from the Grand Slam, she made her top-five debut.

=== East Asian fall swing ===
==== China Open ====
Having rested for near a month, Andreescu returned to court in the China Open, the tournament she never played before. She upset Aliaksandra Sasnovich, Elise Mertens and Jennifer Brady to reach quarterfinals, where her opponent was the former World No. 1 players Naomi Osaka. She eventually lost to the Japanese woman after three tough sets, ending her 17-match winning streak. Nevertheless, Andreescu was still qualified for the WTA Finals for the first time in her career.

=== Year-end Championships ===
==== WTA Finals ====
At the Year-end Championships, Andreescu was divided into the purple group, alongside Karolína Plíšková, Simona Halep and defending champion Elina Svitolina. The first round robin match against Halep marked the first-ever meeting between the two Romanian descendants. Despite having a match point, she was still edged by the 2019 Wimbledon Champion in three tough sets. In the second match against World No. 2 Plíšková, Andreescu retired after losing the opening set when she injured her knee. The injury ended her season a little bit earlier than expected as she withdrew from the tournament. Sofia Kenin later replaced her to complete the match against Svitolina.

== All matches ==
Key
| W | F | SF | QF | #R | RR | Q# | P# | DNQ | A | Z# | PO | G | S | B | NMS | NTI | P | NH |

(W) winner; (F) finalist; (SF) semifinalist; (QF) quarterfinalist; (#R) rounds 4, 3, 2, 1; (RR) round-robin stage; (Q#) qualification round; (P#) preliminary round; (DNQ) did not qualify; (A) absent; (Z#) Davis/Fed Cup Zonal Group (with number indication) or (PO) play-off; (G) gold, (S) silver or (B) bronze Olympic/Paralympic medal; (NMS) not a Masters tournament; (NTI) not a Tier I tournament; (P) postponed; (NH) not held; (SR) strike rate (events won / competed); (W–L) win–loss record.
To avoid confusion and double counting, these charts are updated at the conclusion of a tournament or when the player's participation has ended.

=== Singles matches ===
| Tournament | Match | Round | Opponent | Rank | Result | Score |
| Auckland Open; Auckland, New Zealand; WTA International; Hard, outdoor 31 December 2018 – 6 January 2019 | 1 | Q1 | (Slovakia) Kristína Kučová | 259 | Win | 6–2, 6–0 |
| Auckland Open; Auckland, New Zealand; WTA International; Hard, outdoor 31 December 2018 – 6 January 2019 | 2 | Q2 | (Australia) Jaimee Fourlis | 206 | Win | 7–5, 6–1 |
| Auckland Open; Auckland, New Zealand; WTA International; Hard, outdoor 31 December 2018 – 6 January 2019 | 3 | Q3 | (Germany) Laura Siegemund [1] | 113 | Win | 3–6, 6–3, 6–3 |
| Auckland Open; Auckland, New Zealand; WTA International; Hard, outdoor 31 December 2018 – 6 January 2019 | 4 | 1R | (Hungary) Tímea Babos | 59 | Win | 6–4, 7–6^{(8–6)} |
| Auckland Open; Auckland, New Zealand; WTA International; Hard, outdoor 31 December 2018 – 6 January 2019 | 5 | 2R | (Denmark) Caroline Wozniacki (1) | 3 | Win | 6–4, 6–4 |
| Auckland Open; Auckland, New Zealand; WTA International; Hard, outdoor 31 December 2018 – 6 January 2019 | 6 | QF | (United States) Venus Williams (6) | 39 | Win | 6–7^{(1–7)}, 6–3, 6–1 |
| Auckland Open; Auckland, New Zealand; WTA International; Hard, outdoor 31 December 2018 – 6 January 2019 | 7 | SF | (Chinese Taipei) Hsieh Su-wei (3) | 28 | Win | 6–3, 6–3 |
| Auckland Open; Auckland, New Zealand; WTA International; Hard, outdoor 31 December 2018 – 6 January 2019 | 8 | F | (Germany) Julia Görges (2) | 14 | Loss (1) | 6–2, 5–7, 1–6 |
| Australian Open; Melbourne, Australia; Grand Slam; Hard, outdoor 14 – 27 January 2019 | 9 | Q1 | (United Kingdom) Katie Swan | 175 | Win | 6–1 ret. |
| Australian Open; Melbourne, Australia; Grand Slam; Hard, outdoor 14 – 27 January 2019 | 10 | Q2 | (Greece) Valentini Grammatikopoulou | 173 | Win | 6–4, 6–1 |
| Australian Open; Melbourne, Australia; Grand Slam; Hard, outdoor 14 – 27 January 2019 | 11 | Q3 | (Czech Republic) Tereza Smitková [26] | 113 | Win | 6–0, 4–1 ret. |
| Australian Open; Melbourne, Australia; Grand Slam; Hard, outdoor 14 – 27 January 2019 | 12 | 1R | (United States) Whitney Osuigwe (WC) | 198 | Win | 7–6^{(7–1)}, 6–7^{(0–7)}, 6–3 |
| Australian Open; Melbourne, Australia; Grand Slam; Hard, outdoor 14 – 27 January 2019 | 13 | 2R | (Latvia) Anastasija Sevastova (13) | 12 | Loss | 3–6, 6–3, 2–6 |
| Newport Beach; California, United States; WTA 125K series Hard, outdoor 21 – 27 January 2019 | – | 1R | Bye | | | |
| Newport Beach; California, United States; WTA 125K series Hard, outdoor 21 – 27 January 2019 | 14 | 2R | (United States) Katie Volynets (Q) | 471 | Win | 6–2, 7–6^{(9–7)} |
| Newport Beach; California, United States; WTA 125K series Hard, outdoor 21 – 27 January 2019 | 15 | 3R | (Czech Republic) Marie Bouzková (9) | 121 | Win | 6–1, 6–2 |
| Newport Beach; California, United States; WTA 125K series Hard, outdoor 21 – 27 January 2019 | 16 | QF | (Canada) Eugenie Bouchard (3) | 79 | Win | 6–2, 6–0 |
| Newport Beach; California, United States; WTA 125K series Hard, outdoor 21 – 27 January 2019 | 17 | SF | (Germany) Tatjana Maria (2) | 74 | Win | 5–7, 7–5, 7–6^{(7–3)} |
| Newport Beach; California, United States; WTA 125K series Hard, outdoor 21 – 27 January 2019 | 18 | W | (United States) Jessica Pegula (7) | 106 | Win (1) | 0–6, 6–4, 6–2 |
| Fed Cup World Group II; Netherlands vs. Canada 's-Hertogenbosch, Netherlands; Fed Cup; Clay, indoor 9 – 10 February 2019 | 19 | - | (Netherlands) Richèl Hogenkamp | 150 | Win | 6–4, 6–2 |
| Fed Cup World Group II; Netherlands vs. Canada 's-Hertogenbosch, Netherlands; Fed Cup; Clay, indoor 9 – 10 February 2019 | 20 | - | (Netherlands) Arantxa Rus | 121 | Win | 6–4, 6–2 |
| Mexican Open; Acapulco, Mexico; WTA International; Hard, outdoor 25 February – 3 March 2019 | 21 | 1R | (Switzerland) Jil Teichmann | 154 | Win | 6–1, 6–3 |
| Mexican Open; Acapulco, Mexico; WTA International; Hard, outdoor 25 February – 3 March 2019 | 22 | 2R | (Romania) Mihaela Buzărnescu (4) | 31 | Win | 6–2, 7–5 |
| Mexican Open; Acapulco, Mexico; WTA International; Hard, outdoor 25 February – 3 March 2019 | 23 | QF | (China) Zheng Saisai (7) | 40 | Win | 7–6^{(7–3)}, 6–1 |
| Mexican Open; Acapulco, Mexico; WTA International; Hard, outdoor 25 February – 3 March 2019 | 24 | SF | (United States) Sofia Kenin (5) | 35 | Loss | 4–6, 6–3, 5–7 |
| Indian Wells Open; Indian Wells, United States; WTA Premier Mandatory; Hard, outdoor 4 – 17 March 2019 | 25 | 1R | (Romania) Irina-Camelia Begu | 70 | Win | 6–7^{(3–7)}, 6–3, 6–3 |
| Indian Wells Open; Indian Wells, United States; WTA Premier Mandatory; Hard, outdoor 4 – 17 March 2019 | 26 | 2R | (Slovakia) Dominika Cibulková (32) | 35 | Win | 6–2, 6–2 |
| Indian Wells Open; Indian Wells, United States; WTA Premier Mandatory; Hard, outdoor 4 – 17 March 2019 | 27 | 3R | (Switzerland) Stefanie Vögele (Q) | 109 | Win | 6–1, 6–2 |
| Indian Wells Open; Indian Wells, United States; WTA Premier Mandatory; Hard, outdoor 4 – 17 March 2019 | 28 | 4R | (China) Wang Qiang (18) | 18 | Win | 7–5, 6–2 |
| Indian Wells Open; Indian Wells, United States; WTA Premier Mandatory; Hard, outdoor 4 – 17 March 2019 | 29 | QF | (Spain) Garbiñe Muguruza (20) | 20 | Win | 6–0, 6–1 |
| Indian Wells Open; Indian Wells, United States; WTA Premier Mandatory; Hard, outdoor 4 – 17 March 2019 | 30 | SF | (Ukraine) Elina Svitolina (6) | 6 | Win | 6–3, 2–6, 6–4 |
| Indian Wells Open; Indian Wells, United States; WTA Premier Mandatory; Hard, outdoor 4 – 17 March 2019 | 31 | W | (Germany) Angelique Kerber (8) | 8 | Win (2) | 6–4, 3–6, 6–4 |
| Miami Open; Miami, United States; WTA Premier Mandatory; Hard, outdoor 18 – 31 March 2019 | 32 | 1R | (Romania) Irina-Camelia Begu | 70 | Win | 4–6, 7–6^{(7–2)}, 6–2 |
| Miami Open; Miami, United States; WTA Premier Mandatory; Hard, outdoor 18 – 31 March 2019 | 33 | 2R | (United States) Sofia Kenin (32) | 34 | Win | 6–3, 6–3 |
| Miami Open; Miami, United States; WTA Premier Mandatory; Hard, outdoor 18 – 31 March 2019 | 34 | 3R | (Germany) Angelique Kerber (8) | 4 | Win | 6–4, 4–6, 6–1 |
| Miami Open; Miami, United States; WTA Premier Mandatory; Hard, outdoor 18 – 31 March 2019 | 35 | 4R | (Estonia) Anett Kontaveit (21) | 19 | Loss | 1–6, 0–2 ret. |
| French Open; Paris, France; Grand Slam; Clay, outdoor 26 May –9 June 2019 | 36 | 1R | (Czech Republic) Marie Bouzková (LL) | 118 | Win | 5–7, 6–4, 6–4 |
| French Open; Paris, France; Grand Slam; Clay, outdoor 26 May –9 June 2019 | – | 2R | (United States) Sofia Kenin | 35 | Withdrew | N/A |
| Canadian Open; Toronto, Canada; WTA Premier 5 Hard, outdoor 5 – 11 August 2019 | 37 | 1R | (Canada) Eugenie Bouchard (WC) | 112 | Win | 4–6, 6–1, 6–4 |
| Canadian Open; Toronto, Canada; WTA Premier 5 Hard, outdoor 5 – 11 August 2019 | 38 | 2R | (Russia) Daria Kasatkina | 39 | Win | 5–7, 6–2, 7–5 |
| Canadian Open; Toronto, Canada; WTA Premier 5 Hard, outdoor 5 – 11 August 2019 | 39 | 3R | (Netherlands) Kiki Bertens (5) | 5 | Win | 6–1, 6–7^{(7–9)}, 6–4 |
| Canadian Open; Toronto, Canada; WTA Premier 5 Hard, outdoor 5 – 11 August 2019 | 40 | QF | (Czech Republic) Karolína Plíšková (3) | 3 | Win | 6–0, 2–6, 6–4 |
| Canadian Open; Toronto, Canada; WTA Premier 5 Hard, outdoor 5 – 11 August 2019 | 41 | SF | (United States) Sofia Kenin | 29 | Win | 6–4, 7–6^{(7–5)} |
| Canadian Open; Toronto, Canada; WTA Premier 5 Hard, outdoor 5 – 11 August 2019 | 42 | W | (United States) Serena Williams (8) | 10 | Win (3) | 3–1 ret. |
| U.S. Open; New York City, United States; Grand Slam; Hard, outdoor 26 August – 8 September 2019 | 43 | 1R | (United States) Katie Volynets (WC) | 413 | Win | 6–2, 6–4 |
| U.S. Open; New York City, United States; Grand Slam; Hard, outdoor 26 August – 8 September 2019 | 44 | 2R | (Belgium) Kirsten Flipkens (LL) | 110 | Win | 6–3, 7–5 |
| U.S. Open; New York City, United States; Grand Slam; Hard, outdoor 26 August – 8 September 2019 | 45 | 3R | (Denmark) Caroline Wozniacki (19) | 19 | Win | 6–4, 6–4 |
| U.S. Open; New York City, United States; Grand Slam; Hard, outdoor 26 August – 8 September 2019 | 46 | 4R | (United States) Taylor Townsend (Q) | 112 | Win | 6–1, 4–6, 6–2 |
| U.S. Open; New York City, United States; Grand Slam; Hard, outdoor 26 August – 8 September 2019 | 47 | QF | (Belgium) Elise Mertens (25) | 26 | Win | 3–6, 6–2, 6–3 |
| U.S. Open; New York City, United States; Grand Slam; Hard, outdoor 26 August – 8 September 2019 | 48 | SF | (Switzerland) Belinda Bencic (13) | 12 | Win | 7–6^{(7–3)}, 7–5 |
| U.S. Open; New York City, United States; Grand Slam; Hard, outdoor 26 August – 8 September 2019 | 49 | W | (United States) Serena Williams (8) | 8 | Win (4) | 6–3, 7–5 |
| China Open; Beijing, China; WTA Premier Mandatory; Hard, outdoor 30 September – 6 October 2019 | 50 | 1R | (Belarus) Aliaksandra Sasnovich | 60 | Win | 6–2, 2–6, 6–1 |
| China Open; Beijing, China; WTA Premier Mandatory; Hard, outdoor 30 September – 6 October 2019 | 51 | 2R | (Belgium) Elise Mertens | 23 | Win | 6–3, 7–6^{(7–5)} |
| China Open; Beijing, China; WTA Premier Mandatory; Hard, outdoor 30 September – 6 October 2019 | 52 | 3R | (United States) Jennifer Brady (Q) | 66 | Win | 6–1, 6–3 |
| China Open; Beijing, China; WTA Premier Mandatory; Hard, outdoor 30 September – 6 October 2019 | 53 | QF | (Japan) Naomi Osaka (4) | 4 | Loss | 7–5, 3–6, 4–6 |
| WTA Finals; Shenzhen, China; Year-end championships Hard, indoor 27 October – 3 November 2019 | 54 | RR | (Romania) Simona Halep (5) | 5 | Loss | 6–3, 6–7^{(6–8)}, 3–6 |
| WTA Finals; Shenzhen, China; Year-end championships Hard, indoor 27 October – 3 November 2019 | 55 | RR | (Czech Republic) Karolína Plíšková (2) | 2 | Loss | 3–6, ret. |
| WTA Finals; Shenzhen, China; Year-end championships Hard, indoor 27 October – 3 November 2019 | – | RR | (Ukraine) Elina Svitolina (8) | 8 | Withdrew | N/A |

=== Doubles matches ===
| Tournament | Match | Round | Opponent | Rank | Result | Score |
| U.S. Open; New York City, United States; Grand Slam; Hard, outdoor 26 August – 8 September 2019; Partner: (Canada) Sharon Fichman | 1 | 1R | (United States) Whitney Osuigwe / (United States) Taylor Townsend (WC) | 516 / 93 | Loss | 2–6, 3–6 |

== Tournament schedule ==
=== Singles schedule ===
Andreescu's 2019 singles tournament schedule is as follows:

| Date | Tournament | Location | Category | Surface | 2018 result | 2018 points | 2019 points | Outcome |
|---|---|---|---|---|---|---|---|---|
| 31 December 2018 – 6 January 2019 | Auckland Open | New Zealand | International | Hard | DNP | 0 | 198 | Final lost to (Germany) Julia Görges; 6–2, 5–7, 1–6 |
| 14 January 2019 – 27 January 2019 | Australian Open | Australia | Grand Slam | Hard | Q1 | 2 | 110 | Second round lost to (Latvia) Anastasija Sevastova; 3–6, 6–3, 2–6 |
| 21 January 2019 – 27 January 2019 | Newport Beach | United States | 125K series | Hard | DNP | 0 | 160 | Winner defeated (United States) Jessica Pegula; 0–6, 6–4, 6–2 |
| 25 February 2019 – 3 March 2019 | Mexican Open | Mexico | International | Hard | DNP | 0 | 110 | Semifinals lost to (United States) Sofia Kenin; 4–6, 6–3, 5–7 |
| 4 March 2019 – 17 March 2019 | Indian Wells Open | United States | Premier Mandatory | Hard | DNP | 0 | 1000 | Winner defeated (Germany) Angelique Kerber; 6–4, 3–6, 6–4 |
| 18 March 2019 – 31 April 2019 | Miami Open | United States | Premier Mandatory | Hard | DNP | 0 | 120 | Fourth round lost to (Estonia) Anett Kontaveit; 1–6, 0–2 ret. |
| 26 May 2019 – 9 June 2019 | French Open | France | Grand Slam | Clay | Q3 | 30 | 70 | Second round withdrew against (United States) Sofia Kenin; N/A |
| 5 August 2019 – 11 August 2019 | Canadian Open | Canada | Premier 5 | Hard | DNP | 0 | 900 | Winner defeated (United States) Serena Williams; 3–1 ret. |
| 26 August 2019 – 9 September 2019 | U.S. Open | United States | Grand Slam | Hard | Q1 | 2 | 2000 | Winner defeated (United States) Serena Williams; 6–3, 7–5 |
| 31 September 2019 – 6 October 2019 | China Open | China | Premier Mandatory | Hard | DNP | 0 | 215 | Quarterfinals round lost to (Japan) Naomi Osaka; 7–5, 3–6, 4–6 |
| 27 October 2019 – 3 November 2019 | WTA Finals | China | Year-end Championships | Hard (i) | DNQ | 0 | 250 | Round robin withdrew against (Ukraine) Elina Svitolina; 2 losses |
| Total year-end points | | | | | | 385 | 5192 | ▲4806 difference |

=== Doubles schedule ===
Andreescu's 2019 doubles tournament schedule is as follows:

| Date | Tournament | Location | Category | Surface | 2018 result | 2018 points | 2019 points | Outcome |
|---|---|---|---|---|---|---|---|---|
| 26 August 2019 – 9 September 2019 | U.S. Open | United States | Grand Slam | Hard | DNP | 0 | 10 | First round lost to (United States) Whitney Osuigwe / (United States) Taylor Townsend; 2–6, 3–6 |
| Total year-end points | | | | | | 83 | 10 | ▼73 difference |

== Yearly records ==
=== Top 10 wins ===
| # | Player | Rank | Tournament | Surface | Round | Score | BAR |
|---|---|---|---|---|---|---|---|
| 1. | (Denmark) Caroline Wozniacki | No. 3 | Auckland Open, New Zealand | Hard | 2nd Round | 6–4, 6–4 | No. 152 |
| 2. | (Ukraine) Elina Svitolina | No. 6 | Indian Wells Open, United States | Hard | Semifinals | 6–3, 2–6, 6–4 | No. 60 |
| 3. | (Germany) Angelique Kerber | No. 8 | Indian Wells Open, United States | Hard | Final | 6–4, 3–6, 6–4 | No. 60 |
| 4. | (Germany) Angelique Kerber | No. 4 | Miami Open, United States | Hard | 3rd Round | 6–4, 4–6, 6–1 | No. 24 |
| 5. | (Netherlands) Kiki Bertens | No. 5 | Rogers Cup, Canada | Hard | 3rd Round | 6–1, 6–7^{(7–9)}, 6–4 | No. 27 |
| 6. | (Czech Republic) Karolína Plíšková | No. 3 | Rogers Cup, Canada | Hard | Quarterfinals | 6–0, 2–6, 6–4 | No. 27 |
| 7. | (United States) Serena Williams | No. 10 | Rogers Cup, Canada | Hard | Final | 3–1 ret. | No. 27 |
| 8. | (United States) Serena Williams | No. 8 | US Open, United States | Hard | Final | 6–3, 7–5 | No. 15 |

=== Finals ===
Singles: 4 (3 titles, 1 runner-up)

| Legend Grand Slam tournaments (1–0) WTA Tour Championships (0–0) Premier Mandatory & Premier 5 (2–0) Premier (0–0) International (0–1) | Finals by surface Hard (3–1) Clay (0–0) Grass (0–0) Carpet (0–0) | Finals by setting Outdoors (3–1) Indoors (0–0) |

| Result | W–L | Date | Tournament | Tier | Surface | Opponent | Score |
|---|---|---|---|---|---|---|---|
| Loss | 0–1 | Jan 2019 | Auckland Open, New Zealand | International | Hard | (Germany) Julia Görges | 6–2, 5–7, 1–6 |
| Win | 1–1 | Mar 2019 | Indian Wells Open, United States | Premier M | Hard | (Germany) Angelique Kerber | 6–4, 3–6, 6–4 |
| Win | 2–1 | Aug 2019 | Canadian Open, Canada | Premier 5 | Hard | (United States) Serena Williams | 3–1 ret. |
| Win | 3–1 | Sep 2019 | US Open, United States | Grand Slam | Hard | (United States) Serena Williams | 6–3, 7–5 |

=== Earnings ===
| # | Tournament | Singles Prize money | Doubles Prize money | Year-to-date |
|---|---|---|---|---|
| 1. | Auckland Open | $21,400 | $0 | $21,400 |
| 2. | Australian Open | $78,121 | $0 | $99,521 |
| 3. | Newport Beach | $24,000 | $0 | $123,521 |
| 4. | Fed Cup | —N/a | —N/a | $123,521 |
| 5. | Mexican Open | $11,500 | $0 | $135,021 |
| 6. | Indian Wells Masters | $1,354,010 | $0 | $1,489,031 |
| 7. | Miami Open | $91,205 | $0 | $1,580,236 |
| 8. | French Open | $100,219 | $0 | $1,680,455 |
| 9. | Canadian Open | $521,530 | $0 | $2,201,985 |
| 10. | US Open | $3,850,000 | $8,500 | $6,060,485 |
| 11. | China Open | $178,665 | $0 | $6,239,150 |
| Total prize money | | | | $6,239,150 |

== See also ==
- 2019 WTA Tour
- 2019 Simona Halep tennis season
- Bianca Andreescu career statistics
