= 2019 Simona Halep tennis season =

2019 tennis season about Romanian player Simona Halep

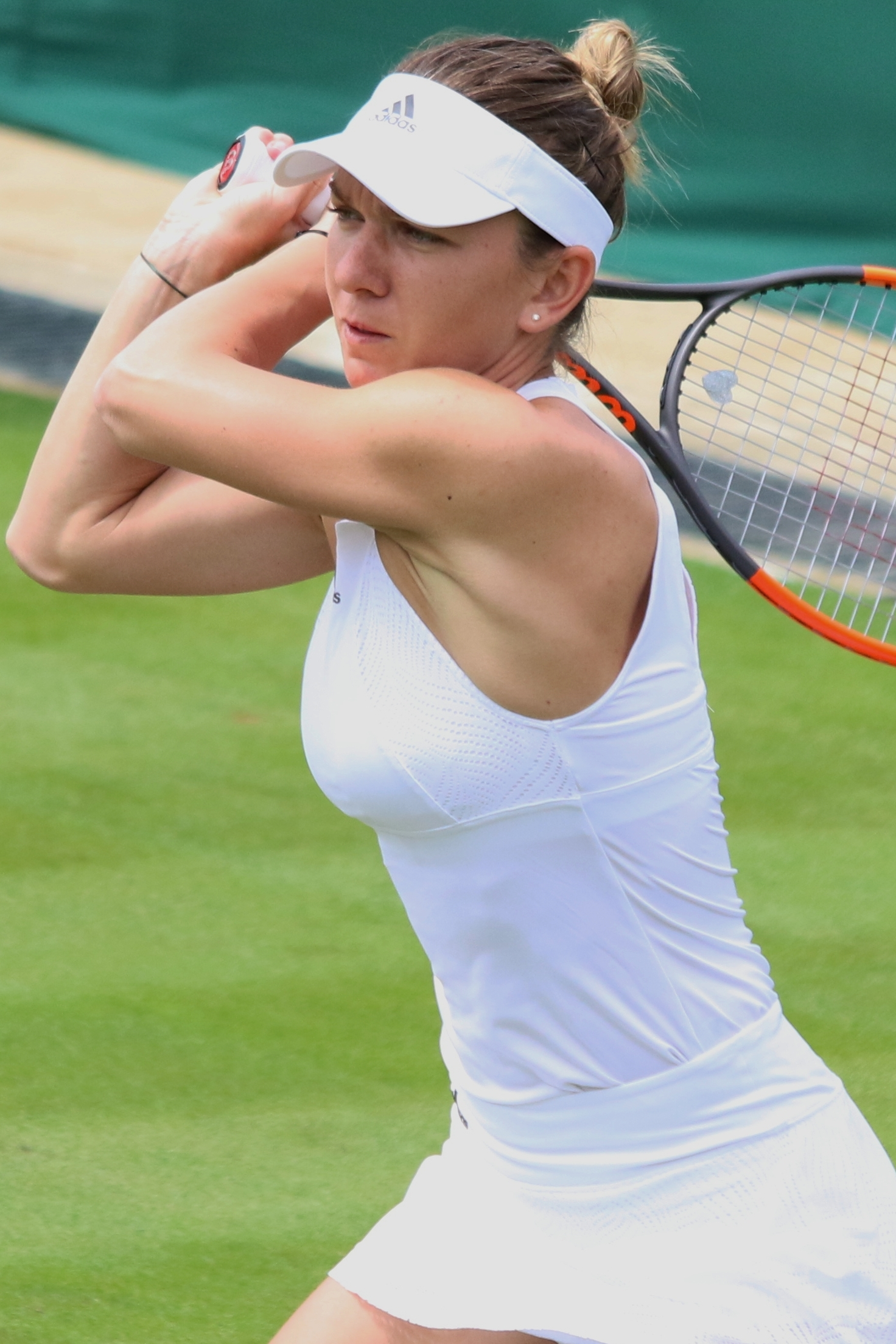
- Simona Halep at the 2017 Wimbledon Championships
- Full name: Simona Halep
- Country: Romania
- Calendar prize money: $6,962,442

Singles
- Season record: 43–17
- Calendar titles: 1
- Current ranking: No. 4
- Ranking change from previous year: ▼3

Grand Slam & significant results
- Australian Open: 4R
- French Open: QF
- Wimbledon: W
- US Open: 2R

Doubles
- Season record: 5–5
- Calendar titles: 0
- Current ranking: 146
- Year-end ranking: 165
- Ranking change from previous year: ▲19

Grand Slam doubles results
- Australian Open: A
- French Open: A
- Wimbledon: A
- US Open: A

Grand Slam mixed doubles results
- Australian Open: A
- French Open: A
- Wimbledon: A
- US Open: A
- Last updated on: 5 February 2025.

The 2019 Simona Halep tennis season officially began on 8 January 2019 at the Sydney International. Simona Halep entered the season as the No. 1 ranked player in the world.

== Year in detail ==
=== Background ===
Simona Halep began the 2019 season in Australia as the world No. 1, following an outstanding 2018 season in which she held the top ranking for 48 weeks. Her campaign was highlighted by a big win at Roland Garros, where she defeated Sloane Stephens in a hard-fought three-set final to claim her first Grand Slam title. Additionally, she secured two more titles in Shenzhen and Montreal, earning enough points to finish the year as the world No. 1.

=== Early hard court season and Australian Open ===
==== Sydney International ====
Halep began the season at the Sydney International as the top seed but suffered a straight-sets defeat to Ashleigh Barty, who was ranked No. 15 in the world at the time. This loss extended her losing streak to five matches.

==== Australian Open ====
Seeking her first win since the 2018 Western & Southern Open, Halep's next tournament was the 2019 Australian Open, where she was the No. 1 seed for the second consecutive year. There, she had to defend her finalist points, giving the entire top 11 a chance to claim the top spot (top 10 if Halep played her first match). After the draw allocation, she discovered that she would face Kaia Kanepi in the first round, setting up a rematch of their 2018 US Open opener, where she had fallen short against the Estonian. Determined to turn the tables, Halep fought hard and secured a three-set victory over Kanepi, marking her first win in nearly five months. In the round of 64, Halep faced the newly crowned WTA champion in Hobart, Sofia Kenin, defeating her in three sets despite initially leading by a set and a break in the second. Throughout the match, she showcased an aggressive game, firing nine aces and hitting 33 winners. In the next rounds, she faced the Williams sisters, starting with Venus in the third round. Halep delivered a dominant performance, losing only five games and securing a straight-sets victory, her first since the Cincinnati Open semifinal. However, the challenge intensified as she faced Serena Williams in the fourth round, a seven-time Australian Open champion. In their 10th career meeting, Serena dominated the first set, winning 6–1 in just 21 minutes. Despite breaking Serena in the opening game, Halep struggled on serve, losing all of her service games in the set. The second set was much more competitive, with Halep finding her rhythm. She eventually broke Serena’s serve at 5–4, leveling the match at one set apiece. The decisive moment came in the sixth game of the third set, where Serena saved three break points to hold serve. In the following game, she broke Halep’s serve, gaining the crucial advantage. Serena maintained her lead for the remainder of the set, ultimately securing the victory. Following her defeat, Halep's ranking became vulnerable, giving Naomi Osaka, Petra Kvitová, Elina Svitolina, and Karolína Plíšková the opportunity to surpass her. Ultimately, Osaka claimed the world No. 1 ranking after winning the title, while Halep dropped to No. 3, behind the Australian Open finalists, Osaka and Kvitová.

==== Fed Cup World Group Quarterfinal ====
After securing a victory in the World Group play-offs against Switzerland the previous year, Team Romania returned to the World Group for the first time since 2016. In the quarterfinals, they faced the Czech Republic in Ostrava. Halep was selected to play in the singles rubbers. In her first match against Kateřina Siniaková, she delivered a dominant performance, losing only four games throughout the match. The following day, she faced Karolína Plíšková, the world No. 5, in a highly competitive encounter. After a grueling 2 hours and 37 minutes, Halep emerged victorious, avenging her 2016 Fed Cup quarterfinal loss to Plíšková. With Halep’s two victories and a decisive doubles rubber win by Monica Niculescu and Irina-Camelia Begu, Romania advanced to the Fed Cup semifinals for the first time since 1973.

==== Qatar Ladies Open ====
Following her successful Fed Cup performance, Simona Halep entered the 2019 Qatar Total Open in Doha as the top seed, receiving a first-round bye. In the second round, she faced Lesia Tsurenko, securing a straight-sets victory. Advancing to the quarterfinals, Halep overcame Julia Görges in two tight sets, both decided by tiebreaks. In the semifinals, she faced Elina Svitolina and, despite trailing in the third set 1–4, she set a comeback, winning the last five games. This victory propelled her into her first final of the season and her first final at this event since 2014. In the championship match, Halep competed against the Belgian Elise Mertens. After taking the first set and having a break in the second set, Halep was unable to maintain her momentum, ultimately falling in three sets. This win marked Mertens' first Premier-level title, and also this tournament marked Halep's first final of the season. Despite the loss, Halep’s run in Doha allowed her to rise one spot in the WTA rankings, reclaiming the world No. 2 position.

==== Dubai Tennis Championships ====
Following her runner-up finish at the Qatar Total Open, Simona Halep entered the 2019 Dubai Tennis Championships as the No. 3 seed. After receiving a first-round bye, she faced Canadian wild card Eugenie Bouchard in the second round. In a tightly contested match, Halep secured a 7–6(4), 6–4 victory, marking her 200th main-draw match win on the WTA Tour. Advancing to the third round, Halep met Tsurenko, whom she had recently defeated in Doha. Replicating her previous success, Halep won in straight sets, 6–3, 7–5, by winning the final 12 points of the match. In the quarterfinals, Halep faced Switzerland's Belinda Bencic. Despite winning the first set, Halep was unable to maintain her momentum due to injuries, ultimately falling 6–4, 4–6, 2–6. Bencic went on to win the tournament, defeating Petra Kvitová in the final. Despite the quarterfinal exit, Halep maintained her World No. 2 ranking, as Kvitová's loss in the final prevented her from surpassing Halep in the standings.

=== March sunshine events ===
==== Indian Wells Open ====
Halep entered the BNP Paribas Open at Indian Wells as the No. 2 seed. After receiving a first-round bye, she faced Barbora Strýcová in the second round, securing a straight-sets victory and maintaining her undefeated record against the Czech player. In the third round, Halep continued her strong performance by defeating Kateryna Kozlova in two sets. However, her tournament run concluded in the fourth round with a three-set loss to 19-year-old Markéta Vondroušová, marking a significant upset in the tournament. Despite this early exit, Halep retained her No. 2 position in the WTA world rankings.

==== Miami Open ====
After Indian Wells, Halep competed at the Miami Open, where she was seeded second. After a first-round bye, she defeated Taylor Townsend in the second round in straight sets. In the third round, she faced Polona Hercog and advanced after a closely contested three-set match. In the fourth round, Halep overcame Venus Williams, before defeating Wang Qiang in the quarterfinals to reach the last four. With Naomi Osaka having been eliminated earlier in the tournament, Halep had a chance to regain the world No. 1 ranking if she reached the final. However, her run ended in the semifinals, where she lost in straight sets to Karolína Plíšková. Following the tournament, Halep remained ranked world No. 2.

=== European clay court season ===
==== Fed Cup World Group Semifinal ====
Her first clay-court event of the season was Fed Cup Semifinal. There, Romanian Fed Cup Team faced France in Rouen. In the singles rubber, Halep defeated Kristina Mladenovic and Caroline Garcia. At the doubles rubber, she played instead of Irina-Camelia Begu, withdrawing due to ankle injury, with Monica Niculescu. Anyway, after taking the first set, they lost, giving to France a ticket to the Fed Cup final.

=== English grass court season ===
==== Wimbledon ====
Halep won the 2019 Wimbledon Championships defeating Serena Williams 6–2, 6–2.

== All matches ==
Key
W	F	SF	QF	#R	RR	Q#	P#	DNQ	A	Z#	PO	G	S	B	NMS	NTI	P	NH

(W) winner; (F) finalist; (SF) semifinalist; (QF) quarterfinalist; (#R) rounds 4, 3, 2, 1; (RR) round-robin stage; (Q#) qualification round; (P#) preliminary round; (DNQ) did not qualify; (A) absent; (Z#) Davis/Fed Cup Zonal Group (with number indication) or (PO) play-off; (G) gold, (S) silver or (B) bronze Olympic/Paralympic medal; (NMS) not a Masters tournament; (NTI) not a Tier I tournament; (P) postponed; (NH) not held; (SR) strike rate (events won / competed); (W–L) win–loss record.
To avoid confusion and double counting, these charts are updated at the conclusion of a tournament or when the player's participation has ended.

=== Singles matches ===
Tournament	Match	Round	Opponent	Rank	Result	Score
Sydney International; Sydney, Australia; WTA Premier; Hard, outdoor 6–12 January 2019	–	1R	Bye			
Sydney International; Sydney, Australia; WTA Premier; Hard, outdoor 6–12 January 2019	1	2R	(Australia) Ashleigh Barty	15	Loss	4–6, 4–6
Australian Open; Melbourne, Australia; Grand Slam; Hard, outdoor 14–27 January 2019	2	1R	(Estonia) Kaia Kanepi	71	Win	6–7^{(2–7)}, 6–4, 6–2
Australian Open; Melbourne, Australia; Grand Slam; Hard, outdoor 14–27 January 2019	3	2R	(United States) Sofia Kenin	37	Win	6–3, 6–7^{(5–7)}, 6–4
Australian Open; Melbourne, Australia; Grand Slam; Hard, outdoor 14–27 January 2019	4	3R	(United States) Venus Williams	36	Win	6–2, 6–3
Australian Open; Melbourne, Australia; Grand Slam; Hard, outdoor 14–27 January 2019	5	4R	(United States) Serena Williams (16)	16	Loss	1–6, 6–4, 4–6
Fed Cup World Group; Czech Republic vs. Romania; Ostrava, Czech Republic; Fed Cup; Hard, indoor 9–10 February 2019	6	QF	(Czech Republic) Kateřina Siniaková	44	Win	6–4, 6–0
Fed Cup World Group; Czech Republic vs. Romania; Ostrava, Czech Republic; Fed Cup; Hard, indoor 9–10 February 2019	7	QF	(Czech Republic) Karolína Plíšková	5	Win	6–4, 5–7, 6–4
Qatar Total Open; Doha, Qatar; WTA Premier; Hard, outdoor 11–16 February 2019	–	1R	Bye			
Qatar Total Open; Doha, Qatar; WTA Premier; Hard, outdoor 11–16 February 2019	8	2R	(Ukraine) Lesia Tsurenko	24	Win	6–2, 6–3
Qatar Total Open; Doha, Qatar; WTA Premier; Hard, outdoor 11–16 February 2019	9	QF	(Germany) Julia Görges (9)	16	Win	7–6^{(7–1)}, 7–6^{(8–6)}
Qatar Total Open; Doha, Qatar; WTA Premier; Hard, outdoor 11–16 February 2019	10	SF	(Ukraine) Elina Svitolina (4/WC)	7	Win	6–3, 3–6, 6–4
Qatar Total Open; Doha, Qatar; WTA Premier; Hard, outdoor 11–16 February 2019	11	F	(Belgium) Elise Mertens	21	Loss (1)	6–3, 4–6, 3–6
Dubai Tennis Championships; Dubai, United Arab Emirates; WTA Premier 5 Hard, outdoor 17–23 February 2019	–	1R	Bye			
Dubai Tennis Championships; Dubai, United Arab Emirates; WTA Premier 5 Hard, outdoor 17–23 February 2019	12	2R	(Canada) Eugenie Bouchard (WC)	79	Win	7–6^{(7–4)}, 6–4
Dubai Tennis Championships; Dubai, United Arab Emirates; WTA Premier 5 Hard, outdoor 17–23 February 2019	13	3R	(Ukraine) Lesia Tsurenko	23	Win	6–3, 7–5
Dubai Tennis Championships; Dubai, United Arab Emirates; WTA Premier 5 Hard, outdoor 17–23 February 2019	14	QF	(Switzerland) Belinda Bencic	45	Loss	6–4, 4–6, 2–6
Indian Wells Open; Indian Wells, United States; WTA Premier Mandatory; Hard, outdoor 4–17 March 2019	–	1R	Bye			
Indian Wells Open; Indian Wells, United States; WTA Premier Mandatory; Hard, outdoor 4–17 March 2019	15	2R	(Czech Republic) Barbora Strýcová	50	Win	6–2, 6–4
Indian Wells Open; Indian Wells, United States; WTA Premier Mandatory; Hard, outdoor 4–17 March 2019	16	3R	(Ukraine) Kateryna Kozlova (Q)	114	Win	7–6^{(7–3)}, 7–5
Indian Wells Open; Indian Wells, United States; WTA Premier Mandatory; Hard, outdoor 4–17 March 2019	17	4R	(Czech Republic) Markéta Vondroušová	61	Loss	2–6, 6–3, 2–6
Miami Open; Miami, United States; WTA Premier Mandatory; Hard, outdoor 18–31 March 2019	–	1R	Bye			
Miami Open; Miami, United States; WTA Premier Mandatory; Hard, outdoor 18–31 March 2019	18	2R	(United States) Taylor Townsend (Q)	96	Win	6–1, 6–3
Miami Open; Miami, United States; WTA Premier Mandatory; Hard, outdoor 18–31 March 2019	19	3R	(Slovenia) Polona Hercog (LL)	93	Win	5–7, 7–6^{(7–1)}, 6–2
Miami Open; Miami, United States; WTA Premier Mandatory; Hard, outdoor 18–31 March 2019	20	4R	(United States) Venus Williams	43	Win	6–3, 6–3
Miami Open; Miami, United States; WTA Premier Mandatory; Hard, outdoor 18–31 March 2019	21	QF	(China) Wang Qiang (18)	18	Win	6–4, 7–5
Miami Open; Miami, United States; WTA Premier Mandatory; Hard, outdoor 18–31 March 2019	22	SF	(Czech Republic) Karolína Plíšková (5)	7	Loss	5–7, 1–6
Fed Cup World Group; France vs. Romania; Rouen, France; Fed Cup; Clay, indoor 20–21 April 2019	23	SF	(France) Kristina Mladenovic	66	Win	6–3, 6–1
Fed Cup World Group; France vs. Romania; Rouen, France; Fed Cup; Clay, indoor 20–21 April 2019	24	SF	(France) Caroline Garcia	21	Win	6–7^{(6–8)}, 6–3, 6–4
Madrid Open; Madrid, Spain; WTA Premier Mandatory; Clay, outdoor 3–12 May 2019	25	1R	(Russia) Margarita Gasparyan (Q)	64	Win	6–0, 6–4
Madrid Open; Madrid, Spain; WTA Premier Mandatory; Clay, outdoor 3–12 May 2019	26	2R	(United Kingdom) Johanna Konta	41	Win	7–5, 6–1
Madrid Open; Madrid, Spain; WTA Premier Mandatory; Clay, outdoor 3–12 May 2019	27	3R	(Slovakia) Viktória Kužmová	46	Win	6–0, 6–0
Madrid Open; Madrid, Spain; WTA Premier Mandatory; Clay, outdoor 3–12 May 2019	28	QF	(Australia) Ashleigh Barty (9)	9	Win	7–5, 7–5
Madrid Open; Madrid, Spain; WTA Premier Mandatory; Clay, outdoor 3–12 May 2019	29	SF	(Switzerland) Belinda Bencic	18	Win	6–2, 6–7^{(2–7)}, 6–0
Madrid Open; Madrid, Spain; WTA Premier Mandatory; Clay, outdoor 3–12 May 2019	30	F	(Netherlands) Kiki Bertens (7)	7	Loss (2)	4–6, 4–6
Italian Open; Rome, Italy; WTA Premier 5 Clay, outdoor 13–19 May 2019	–	1R	Bye			
Italian Open; Rome, Italy; WTA Premier 5 Clay, outdoor 13–19 May 2019	31	2R	(Czech Republic) Markéta Vondroušová	44	Loss	6–2, 5–7, 3–6
French Open; Paris, France; Grand Slam; Clay, outdoor 26 May – 9 June 2019	32	1R	(Australia) Ajla Tomljanović	47	Win	6–2, 3–6, 6–1
French Open; Paris, France; Grand Slam; Clay, outdoor 26 May – 9 June 2019	33	2R	(Poland) Magda Linette	87	Win	6–4, 5–7, 6–3
French Open; Paris, France; Grand Slam; Clay, outdoor 26 May – 9 June 2019	34	3R	(Ukraine) Lesia Tsurenko (27)	27	Win	6–2, 6–1
French Open; Paris, France; Grand Slam; Clay, outdoor 26 May – 9 June 2019	35	4R	(Poland) Iga Świątek	104	Win	6–1, 6–0
French Open; Paris, France; Grand Slam; Clay, outdoor 26 May – 9 June 2019	36	QF	(United States) Amanda Anisimova	51	Loss	2–6, 4–6
Eastbourne International; Eastbourne, United Kingdom; WTA Premier; Grass, outdoor 23–29 June 2019	–	1R	Bye			
Eastbourne International; Eastbourne, United Kingdom; WTA Premier; Grass, outdoor 23–29 June 2019	37	2R	(Chinese Taipei) Hsieh Su-wei	29	Win	6–2, 6–0
Eastbourne International; Eastbourne, United Kingdom; WTA Premier; Grass, outdoor 23–29 June 2019	38	3R	(Slovenia) Polona Hercog (Q)	60	Win	6–1, 4–6, 6–3
Eastbourne International; Eastbourne, United Kingdom; WTA Premier; Grass, outdoor 23–29 June 2019	39	QF	(Germany) Angelique Kerber (4/WC)	5	Loss	4–6, 3–6
Wimbledon Championships; London, United Kingdom; Grand Slam; Grass, outdoor 1–14 July 2019	40	1R	(Belarus) Aliaksandra Sasnovich	36	Win	6–4, 7–5
Wimbledon Championships; London, United Kingdom; Grand Slam; Grass, outdoor 1–14 July 2019	41	2R	(Romania) Mihaela Buzărnescu	53	Win	6–3, 4–6, 6–2
Wimbledon Championships; London, United Kingdom; Grand Slam; Grass, outdoor 1–14 July 2019	42	3R	(Belarus) Victoria Azarenka	40	Win	6–3, 6–1
Wimbledon Championships; London, United Kingdom; Grand Slam; Grass, outdoor 1–14 July 2019	43	4R	(United States) Cori Gauff (Q)	313	Win	6–3, 6–3
Wimbledon Championships; London, United Kingdom; Grand Slam; Grass, outdoor 1–14 July 2019	44	QF	(China) Zhang Shuai	50	Win	7–6^{(7–4)}, 6–1
Wimbledon Championships; London, United Kingdom; Grand Slam; Grass, outdoor 1–14 July 2019	45	SF	(Ukraine) Elina Svitolina (8)	8	Win	6–1, 6–3
Wimbledon Championships; London, United Kingdom; Grand Slam; Grass, outdoor 1–14 July 2019	46	W	(United States) Serena Williams (11)	10	Win (1)	6–2, 6–2
Canadian Open; Toronto, Canada; WTA Premier 5 Hard, outdoor 5–11 August 2019	–	1R	Bye			
Canadian Open; Toronto, Canada; WTA Premier 5 Hard, outdoor 5–11 August 2019	47	2R	(United States) Jennifer Brady (Q)	76	Win	4–6, 7–5, 7–6^{(7–5)}
Canadian Open; Toronto, Canada; WTA Premier 5 Hard, outdoor 5–11 August 2019	48	3R	(Russia) Svetlana Kuznetsova (WC)	198	Win	6–2, 6–1
Canadian Open; Toronto, Canada; WTA Premier 5 Hard, outdoor 5–11 August 2019	49	QF	(Czech Republic) Marie Bouzková (Q)	91	Loss	4–6, retired
Cincinnati Open; Cincinnati, United States; WTA Premier 5 Hard, outdoor 12–18 August 2019	–	1R	Bye			
Cincinnati Open; Cincinnati, United States; WTA Premier 5 Hard, outdoor 12–18 August 2019	50	2R	(Russia) Ekaterina Alexandrova	43	Win	3–6, 7–5, 6–4
Cincinnati Open; Cincinnati, United States; WTA Premier 5 Hard, outdoor 12–18 August 2019	51	3R	(United States) Madison Keys (16)	18	Loss	1–6, 6–3, 5–7
U.S. Open; New York City, United States; Grand Slam; Hard, outdoor 26 August – 8 September 2019	52	1R	(United States) Nicole Gibbs (LL)	135	Win	6–3, 3–6, 6–2
U.S. Open; New York City, United States; Grand Slam; Hard, outdoor 26 August – 8 September 2019	53	2R	(United States) Taylor Townsend (Q)	53	Loss	6–2, 3–6, 6–7^{(4–7)}
Wuhan Open; Wuhan, China; WTA Premier 5 Hard, outdoor 22–28 September 2019	–	1R	Bye			
Wuhan Open; Wuhan, China; WTA Premier 5 Hard, outdoor 22–28 September 2019	54	2R	(Czech Republic) Barbora Strýcová	34	Win	6–3, 6–2
Wuhan Open; Wuhan, China; WTA Premier 5 Hard, outdoor 22–28 September 2019	55	3R	(Kazakhstan) Elena Rybakina (WC)	50	Loss	4–5, retired
China Open; Beijing, China; WTA Premier Mandatory; Hard, outdoor 30 September – 6 October 2019	56	1R	(Sweden) Rebecca Peterson (Q)	57	Win	6–1, 6–1
China Open; Beijing, China; WTA Premier Mandatory; Hard, outdoor 30 September – 6 October 2019	57	2R	(Russia) Ekaterina Alexandrova	38	Loss	2–6, 3–6
WTA Finals; Shenzhen, China; Year-end championships Hard, indoor 27 October – 3 November 2019	58	RR	(Canada) Bianca Andreescu (4)	4	Win	3–6, 7–6^{(8–6)}, 6–3
WTA Finals; Shenzhen, China; Year-end championships Hard, indoor 27 October – 3 November 2019	59	RR	(Ukraine) Elina Svitolina (8)	8	Loss	5–7, 3–6
WTA Finals; Shenzhen, China; Year-end championships Hard, indoor 27 October – 3 November 2019	60	RR	(Czech Republic) Karolína Plíšková	2	Loss	0–6, 6–2, 4–6

=== Doubles matches ===
Tournament	Match	Round	Opponent	Rank	Result	Score
Miami Open; Miami, USA; WTA Premier Mandatory; Hard, outdoor; 18–31 March 2019; Partner: (Germany) Julia Görges	1	1R	(Hungary) Timea Babos / (France) Kristina Mladenovic (2)	3 / 3	Win	4–6, 6–1, [10–6]
Miami Open; Miami, USA; WTA Premier Mandatory; Hard, outdoor; 18–31 March 2019; Partner: (Germany) Julia Görges	2	2R	(United States) Abigail Spears / (Romania) Monica Niculescu	31 / 56	Loss	6–1, 5–7, [8–10]
Fed Cup World Group France vs. Romania; Rouen, France; Fed Cup; Clay, indoor; 20–21 April 2019; Partner: (Romania) Monica Niculescu	3	SF	(France) Kristina Mladenovic / (France) Caroline Garcia	3 / 887	Loss	7–5, 3–6, 4–6
Madrid Open; Madrid, Spain; WTA Premier Mandatory; Clay, outdoor; 3–12 May 2019; Partner: (Romania) Irina-Camelia Begu	4	1R	(Romania) Raluca Olaru / (Croatia) Darija Jurak	33 / 37	Win	6–2, 6–3
Madrid Open; Madrid, Spain; WTA Premier Mandatory; Clay, outdoor; 3–12 May 2019; Partner: (Romania) Irina-Camelia Begu	5	2R	(Czech Republic) Kateřina Siniaková / (Czech Republic) Barbora Krejčíková (1)	1 / 2	Loss	3–6, 3–6
Eastbourne International; Eastbourne, United Kingdom; WTA Premier; Grass, outdoor; 23–29 June 2019; Partner: (Romania) Raluca Olaru	6	1R	(Canada) Gabriela Dabrowski / (China) Xu Yifan (1)	10 / 10	Win	7–6^{(7–5)}, 7–5
Eastbourne International; Eastbourne, United Kingdom; WTA Premier; Grass, outdoor; 23–29 June 2019; Partner: (Romania) Raluca Olaru	7	QF	(Poland) Alicja Rosolska / (China) Yang Zhaoxuan	27 / 54	Win	2–6, 6–0, [10–4]
Eastbourne International; Eastbourne, United Kingdom; WTA Premier; Grass, outdoor; 23–29 June 2019; Partner: (Romania) Raluca Olaru	8	SF	(Belgium) Kirsten Flipkens / (United States) Bethanie Mattek-Sands	26 / 100	Loss	7–6^{(7–4)}, 2–6, [8–10]
Canadian Open; Toronto, Canada; WTA Premier 5; Hard, outdoor; 5–11 August 2019; Partner: (Canada) Leylah Annie Fernandez	9	1R	(United States) Nicole Melichar / (Czech Republic) Květa Peschke (7)	17 / 17	Loss	6–1, 3–6, [5–10]
Wuhan Open; Wuhan, China; WTA Premier 5; Hard, outdoor; 22–28 September 2019; Partner: (Romania) Raluca Olaru	10	1R	(China) Tang Qianhui / (China) Wang Xinyu (WC)	122 / 223	Win	7–6^{(7–3)}, 4–6, [10–8]
Wuhan Open; Wuhan, China; WTA Premier 5; Hard, outdoor; 22–28 September 2019; Partner: (Romania) Raluca Olaru	11	2R	(China) Yingying Duan / (Russia) Veronika Kudermetova (8)	21 / 33	Withdrew	n/a

== Tournament results ==
=== Singles schedule ===
Halep's 2019 singles tournament results and points is as follows:

Date	Championship	Location	Category	Surface	2018 result	2018 points	2019 points	Outcome
30 December – 5 January	Shenzhen Open	Shenzhen	International	Hard	W	280	0	Did not participate
6 January – 12 January	Sydney International	Sydney	WTA Premier	Hard	DNP	0	1	Second round lost to (Australia) Ashleigh Barty; 4–6, 4–6
14 January – 27 January	Australian Open	Melbourne	Grand Slam	Hard	F	1300	240	Fourth round lost to (United States) Serena Williams; 1–6, 6–4, 4–6
11 February – 16 February	Qatar Open	Doha	WTA Premier (Note: Qatar Total Open was a Premier 5 tournament in 2018.)	Hard	SF	350	305	Final lost to (Belgium) Elise Mertens; 6–3, 4–6, 3–6
17 February – 23 February	Dubai Tennis Championships	Dubai	Premier 5 (Note: Dubai Tennis Championships was a Premier tournament in 2018.)	Hard	DNP	0	190	Quarterfinals lost to (Switzerland) Belinda Bencic; 6–4, 4–6, 2–6
4 March – 17 March	Indian Wells Open	Indian Wells	Premier Mandatory	Hard	SF	390	120	Fourth round lost to (Czech Republic) Markéta Vondroušová; 2–6, 6–3, 2–6
18 March – 31 March	Miami Open	Miami	Premier Mandatory	Hard	3R	65	390	Semifinals lost to (Czech Republic) Karolína Plíšková; 5–7, 1–6
22 April – 28 April	Stuttgart Open	Stuttgart	Premier	Clay (i)	QF	100	0	Withdrew due to hip injury
6 May – 12 May	Madrid Open	Madrid	Premier Mandatory	Clay	QF	215	650	Final lost to (Netherlands) Kiki Bertens; 4–6, 4–6
13 May – 19 May	Italian Open	Rome	Premier 5	Clay	F	585	1	Second round lost to (Czech Republic) Markéta Vondroušová; 6–2, 5–7, 3–6
26 May – 9 June	French Open	Paris	Grand Slam	Clay	W	2000	430	Quarterfinals lost to (United States) Amanda Anisimova; 2–6, 4–6
22 April – 28 April	Eastbourne International	Eastbourne	Premier	Grass	DNP	0	100	Quarterfinals lost to (Germany) Angelique Kerber; 4–6, 3–6
1 July – 14 July	Wimbledon	London	Grand Slam	Grass	3R	130	2000	Winner defeated (United States) Serena Williams; 6–2, 6–2
5 August – 11 August	Canadian Open	Toronto	Premier 5	Hard	W	900	190	Quarterfinals lost to (Czech Republic) Marie Bouzková; 4–6, retired
12 August – 18 August	Cincinnati Open	Cincinnati	Premier 5	Hard	F	585	105	Third round lost to (United States) Madison Keys; 1–6, 6–3, 5–7
26 August – 8 September	US Open	New York City	Grand Slam	Hard	1R	10	70	Second round lost to (United States) Taylor Townsend; 6–2, 3–6, 6–7^{(4–7)}
9 September – 16 September	Zhengzhou Open	Zhengzhou	Premier	Hard	DNP	0	0	Withdrew due to ankle injury
22 September – 28 September	Wuhan Open	Wuhan	Premier 5	Hard	2R	1	105	Third round lost to (Kazakhstan) Elena Rybakina; 4–5, retired.
30 September – 6 October	China Open	Beijing	Premier Mandatory	Hard	1R	10	65	Second round lost to (Russia) Ekaterina Alexandrova; 2–6, 3–6
27 October – 3 November	WTA Finals	Shenzhen	Year-end Championships	Hard	DNP	0	500	Failed to advance into the semifinals 1 won & 2 losses
Road to Shenzhen points						6921	4962	▼ -1959 difference
Total year-end points						6921	5462	▼ -1459 difference

== Yearly records ==
=== Head-to-head matchups ===
Players are ordered by letter.

Player	Rank	Tournament	Surface	Date	W/L	W–L	SHR
(Australia) Ajla Tomljanovic	47	French Open, Paris, France	Clay	May 28, 2019	Win	1–0	3
(Belarus) Aliaksandra Sasnovich	36	Wimbledon Championships, London, United Kingdom	Grass	July 1, 2019	Win	1–0	7
(United States) Amanda Anisimova	37	French Open, Paris, France	Clay	June 6, 2019	Loss	0–1	3
(Germany) Angelique Kerber	5	Eastbourne International, Eastbourne, United Kingdom	Grass	June 27, 2019	Loss	1–0	8
(Australia) Ashleigh Barty	15	Sydney International, Sydney, Australia	Hard	January 9, 2019	Loss	1–1	1
(Australia) Ashleigh Barty	8	Mutua Madrid Open, Madrid, Spain	Clay	May 9, 2019	Win	1–1	3
(Czech Republic) Barbora Strýcová	50	Indian Wells Masters, Indian Wells, United States	Hard	March 9, 2019	Win	2–0	2
(Czech Republic) Barbora Strýcová	34	Wuhan Open, Wuhan, China	Hard	September 24, 2019	Win	2–0	6
(Switzerland) Belinda Bencic	45	Dubai Tennis Championships, Dubai, United Arab Emirates	Hard	February 21, 2019	Loss	1–1	3
(Switzerland) Belinda Bencic	18	Mutua Madrid Open, Madrid, Spain	Clay	May 10, 2019	Win	1–1	3
(Canada) Bianca Andreescu	4	WTA Finals, Shenzhen, China	Hard (i)	October 28, 2019	Win	1–0	5
(France) Caroline Garcia	21	Fed Cup, Rouen, France	Clay (i)	April 21, 2019	Win	1–0	2
(United States) Cori Gauff	313	Wimbledon Championships, London, United Kingdom	Grass	July 8, 2019	Win	1–0	7
(Russia) Ekaterina Alexandrova	43	Cincinnati Open, Cincinnati, United States	Hard	August 14, 2019	Win	1–1	4
(Russia) Ekaterina Alexandrova	38	China Open, Beijing, China	Hard	September 30, 2019	Loss	1–1	5
(Kazakhstan) Elena Rybakina	50	Wuhan Open, Wuhan, China	Hard	September 25, 2019	Loss	0–1	6
(Ukraine) Elina Svitolina	7	Qatar Open, Doha, Qatar	Hard	February 15, 2019	Win	2–1	3
(Ukraine) Elina Svitolina	8	Wimbledon Championships, London, United Kingdom	Grass	July 11, 2019	Win	2–1	7
(Ukraine) Elina Svitolina	8	WTA Finals, Shenzhen, China	Hard (i)	October 30, 2019	Loss	2–1	5
(Belgium) Elise Mertens	21	Qatar Open, Doha, Qatar	Hard	February 16, 2019	Loss	0–1	3
(Canada) Eugenie Bouchard	79	Dubai Tennis Championships, Dubai, UAE	Hard	February 19, 2019	Win	1–0	3
(Chinese Taipei) Hsieh Su-wei	29	Eastbourne International, Eastbourne, United Kingdom	Grass	June 25, 2019	Win	1–0	8
(Poland) Iga Świątek	104	French Open, Paris, France	Clay	June 3, 2019	Win	1–0	3
(United States) Jennifer Brady	76	Canadian Open, Toronto, Canada	Hard	August 7, 2019	Win	1–0	4
(United Kingdom) Johanna Konta	41	Mutua Madrid Open, Madrid, Spain	Clay	May 7, 2019	Win	1–0	3
(Germany) Julia Görges	16	Qatar Open, Doha, Qatar	Hard	February 14, 2019	Win	1–0	3
(Estonia) Kaia Kanepi	71	Australian Open, Melbourne, Australia	Hard	January 15, 2019	Win	1–0	1
(Czech Republic) Karolína Plíšková	5	Fed Cup, Ostrava, Czech Republic	Hard (i)	February 10, 2019	Win	1–2	3
(Czech Republic) Karolína Plíšková	7	Miami Open, Miami, United States	Hard	March 29, 2019	Loss	1–2	3
(Czech Republic) Karolína Plíšková	2	WTA Finals, Shenzhen, China	Hard (i)	November 1, 2019	Loss	1–2	5
(Ukraine) Kateryna Kozlova	114	Indian Wells Masters, Indian Wells, United States	Hard	March 10, 2019	Win	1–0	2
(Czech Republic) Kateřina Siniaková	44	Fed Cup, Ostrava, Czech Republic	Hard (i)	February 9, 2019	Win	1–0	3
(Netherlands) Kiki Bertens	7	Mutua Madrid Open, Madrid, Spain	Clay	May 11, 2019	Loss	0–1	3
(France) Kristina Mladenovic	66	Fed Cup, Rouen, France	Clay (i)	April 20, 2019	Win	1–0	2
(Ukraine) Lesia Tsurenko	24	Qatar Open, Doha, Qatar	Hard	February 13, 2019	Win	3–0	3
(Ukraine) Lesia Tsurenko	23	Dubai Tennis Championships, Dubai, UAE	Hard	February 20, 2019	Win	3–0	3
(Ukraine) Lesia Tsurenko	27	French Open, Paris, France	Clay	June 1, 2019	Win	3–0	3
(United States) Madison Keys	18	Cincinnati Open, Cincinnati, United States	Hard	August 15, 2019	Loss	0–1	4
(Poland) Magda Linette	87	French Open, Paris, France	Clay	May 30, 2019	Win	1–0	3
(Russia) Margarita Gasparyan	64	Mutua Madrid Open, Madrid, Spain	Clay	May 5, 2019	Win	1–0	3
(Czech Republic) Marie Bouzková	91	Canadian Open, Toronto, Canada	Hard	August 9, 2019	Loss	0–1	4
(Czech Republic) Markéta Vondroušová	61	Indian Wells Masters, Indian Wells, United States	Hard	March 12, 2019	Loss	0–2	2
(Czech Republic) Markéta Vondroušová	44	Italian Open, Rome, Italy	Clay	May 16, 2019	Loss	0–2	3
(Romania) Mihaela Buzărnescu	53	Wimbledon Championships, London, United Kingdom	Grass	July 3, 2019	Win	1–0	7
(United States) Nicole Gibbs	135	US Open, New York City, United States	Hard	August 27, 2019	Win	1–0	4
(Slovenia) Polona Hercog	93	Miami Open, Miami, United States	Hard	March 24, 2019	Win	2–0	3
(Slovenia) Polona Hercog	60	Eastbourne International, Eastbourne, United Kingdom	Grass	June 26, 2019	Win	2–0	8
(Sweden) Rebecca Peterson	57	China Open, Beijing, China	Hard	September 29, 2019	Win	1–0	5
(United States) Serena Williams	16	Australian Open, Melbourne, Australia	Hard	January 21, 2019	Loss	1–1	1
(United States) Serena Williams	10	Wimbledon, London, USA	Hard	July 13, 2019	Win	1–1	7
(United States) Sofia Kenin	37	Australian Open, Melbourne, Australia	Hard	January 17, 2019	Win	1–0	1
(Russia) Svetlana Kuznetsova	198	Canadian Open, Toronto, Canada	Hard	August 8, 2019	Win	1–0	4
(United States) Taylor Townsend	96	Miami Open, Miami, United States	Hard	March 22, 2019	Win	1–1	3
(United States) Taylor Townsend	116	US Open, New York City, United States	Hard	August 29, 2019	Loss	1–1	4
(United States) Venus Williams	36	Australian Open, Melbourne, Australia	Hard	January 19, 2019	Win	2–0	1
(United States) Venus Williams	43	Miami Open, Miami, USA	Hard	March 25, 2019	Win	2–0	3
(Belarus) Victoria Azarenka	40	Wimbledon Championships, London, United Kingdom	Grass	July 5, 2019	Win	1–0	7
(China) Wang Qiang	18	Miami Open, Miami, United States	Hard	March 27, 2019	Win	1–0	3
(China) Zhang Shuai	50	Wimbledon Championships, London, United Kingdom	Grass	July 9, 2019	Win	1–0	7

=== Finals ===
Singles: 3 (1 title, 2 runner-ups)

Legend Grand Slam tournaments (1–0) WTA Tour Championships (0–0) Premier Mandatory & Premier 5 (0–1) Premier (0–1) International (0–0)	Finals by surface Hard (0–1) Clay (0–1) Grass (1–0)	Titles by setting Outdoors (1–2) Indoors (0–0)

Result	W–L	Date	Tournament	Tier	Surface	Opponent	Score
Loss	0–1	Feb 2019	Qatar Total Open, Qatar	Premier	Hard	(Belgium) Elise Mertens	6–3, 4–6, 3–6
Loss	0–2	May 2019	Madrid Open, Spain	Premier M	Clay	(Netherlands) Kiki Bertens	4–6, 4–6
Win	1–2	Jul 2019	Wimbledon, UK	Grand Slam	Grass	(United States) Serena Williams	6–2, 6–2

=== Top 10 wins ===
#	Player	Rank	Tournament	Surface	Round	Score	SHR
1.	(Czech Republic) Karolína Plíšková	5	Fed Cup, Ostrava, Czech Republic	Hard (i)	Quarterfinal	6–4, 5–7, 6–4	3
2.	(Ukraine) Elina Svitolina	7	Qatar Total Open, Doha, Qatar	Hard	Semifinal	6–3, 3–6, 6–4	3
3.	(Australia) Ashleigh Barty	9	Madrid Open, Madrid, Spain	Clay	Quarterfinal	7–5, 7–5	3
4.	(Ukraine) Elina Svitolina	8	Wimbledon, London, UK	Grass	Semifinal	6–1, 6–3	7
5.	(United States) Serena Williams	10	Wimbledon, London, UK	Grass	Final	6–2, 6–2	7
6.	(Canada) Bianca Andreescu	4	WTA Finals, Shenzhen, China	Hard (i)	Round Robin	3–6, 7–6^{(8–6)}, 6–3	5
