= Bianca Andreescu career statistics =

Tennis career statistics about Canadian player Bianca Andreescu

Career finals
Discipline	Type	Won	Lost	Total
Singles	Grand Slam	1	0	1
Singles	WTA Finals	–	–	–
Singles	WTA 1000	2	1	3
Singles	WTA Tour	0	2	2
Singles	Olympics	–	–	–
Singles	Total	3	3	6
Doubles	Grand Slam	–	–	–
Doubles	WTA Finals	–	–	–
Doubles	WTA 1000	–	–	–
Doubles	WTA Tour	0	1	1
Doubles	Olympics	–	–	–
Doubles	Total	0	1	1

This is a list of career statistics of Canadian tennis player Bianca Andreescu.

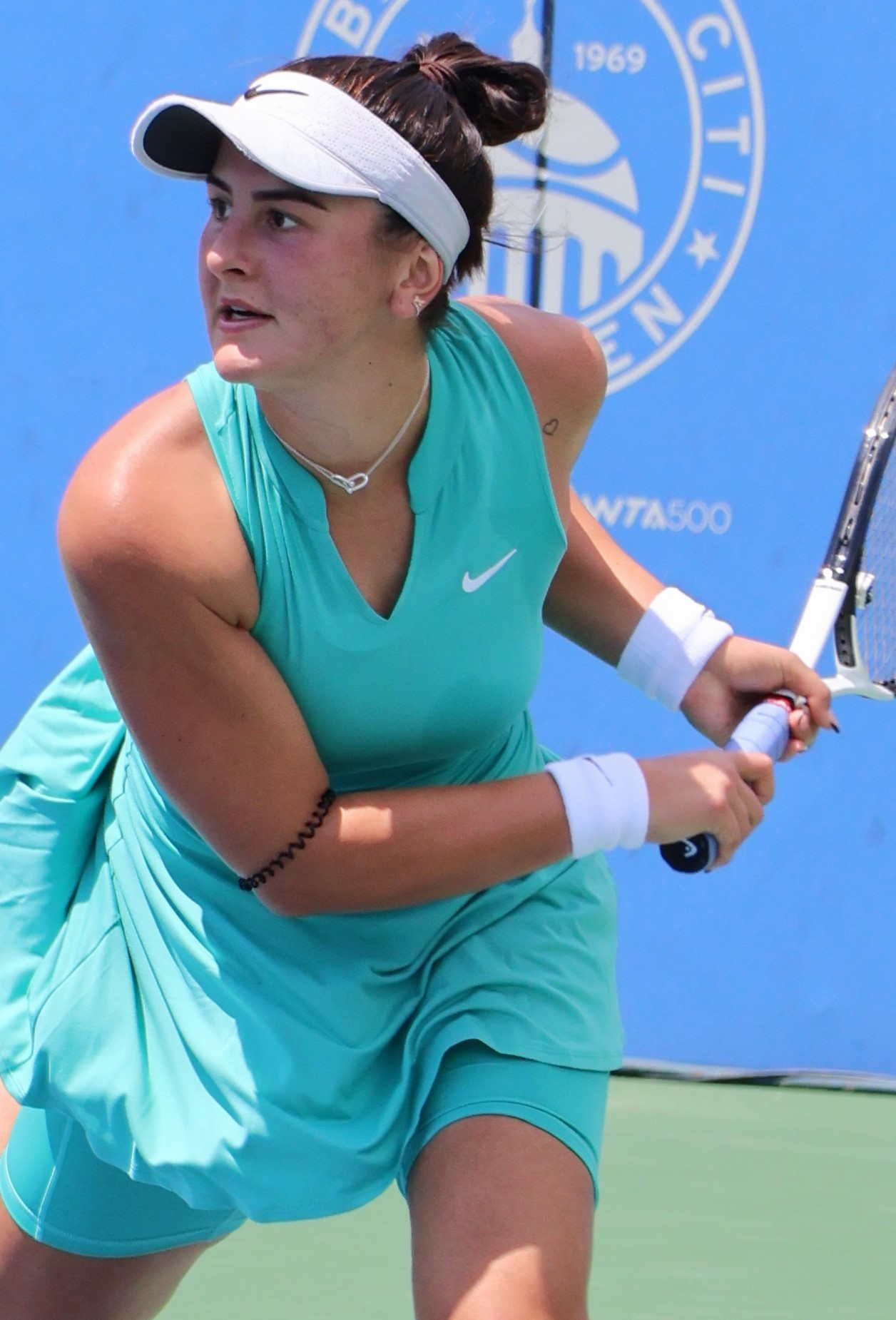
Andreescu at the 2023 Washington Open

== Performance timelines ==
Key
W	F	SF	QF	#R	RR	Q#	P#	DNQ	A	Z#	PO	G	S	B	NMS	NTI	P	NH

(W) winner; (F) finalist; (SF) semifinalist; (QF) quarterfinalist; (#R) rounds 4, 3, 2, 1; (RR) round-robin stage; (Q#) qualification round; (P#) preliminary round; (DNQ) did not qualify; (A) absent; (Z#) Davis/Fed Cup Zonal Group (with number indication) or (PO) play-off; (G) gold, (S) silver or (B) bronze Olympic/Paralympic medal; (NMS) not a Masters tournament; (NTI) not a Tier I tournament; (P) postponed; (NH) not held; (SR) strike rate (events won / competed); (W–L) win–loss record.
To avoid confusion and double counting, these charts are updated at the conclusion of a tournament or when the player's participation has ended.

Only main-draw results in WTA Tour, Grand Slam tournaments, Fed Cup/Billie Jean King Cup, United Cup, Hopman Cup and Olympic Games are included in win–loss records.

=== Singles ===
Current through the 2026 French Open.

Tournament	2015	2016	2017	2018	2019	2020	2021	2022	2023	2024	2025	2026	SR	W–L	Win %
Grand Slam tournaments
Australian Open	A	A	A	Q1	2R	A	2R	A	2R	A	A	A	0 / 3	3–3	50%
French Open	A	A	Q1	Q3	2R (Note: Withdrew during the tournament. Not counted as a loss.)	A	1R	2R	3R	3R	Q2	Q2	0 / 5	6–4	60%
Wimbledon	A	A	1R	Q3	A	NH	1R	2R	3R	3R	Q2	1R	0 / 6	5–6	45%
US Open	A	A	Q1	Q1	W	A	4R	3R	A	1R	A		1 / 4	12–3	80%
Win–loss	0–0	0–0	0–1	0–0	9–1	0–0	4–4	4–3	5–3	4–3	0–0	0–1	1 / 18	26–16	63%
Year-end championships
WTA Finals	DNQ				RR	NH	DNQ						0 / 1	0–2	0%
WTA Elite Trophy (Note: WTA Tournament of Champions was held from 2009 to 2014, when WTA Elite Trophy replaced it.)	DNQ				A	NH			DNQ	NH			0 / 0	0–0	–
National representation
Summer Olympics	NH	A	NH				A	NH		2R	NH		0 / 1	1–1	50%
Billie Jean King Cup (Note: Formerly known as Fed Cup until 2020.)	A	A	PO2	WG2	PO	A (Note: Edition is split into the two years due to COVID-19.)		A	A	A	A		0 / 3	7–3	70%
WTA 1000
Qatar Open	NTI	A	NTI	A	NTI	A	NTI	A	NTI	A	A	A	0 / 0	0–0	–
Dubai Championships	A	NTI	A	NTI	A	NTI	A	NTI	1R	A	A	A	0 / 1	0–1	0%
Indian Wells Open	A	A	A	A	W	NH	3R	A	3R	A	A	1R	1 / 4	9–3	75%
Miami Open	A	A	A	A	4R	NH	F	A	4R	A	A	Q2	0 / 3	11–3	79%
Madrid Open	A	A	A	A	A	NH	A	3R	2R	A	2R	A	0 / 3	3–3	50%
Italian Open	A	A	A	A	A	A	A	QF	2R	A	4R	2R	0 / 4	7–4	64%
Canadian Open	Q1	Q2	1R	A	W	NH	3R	3R	1R	1R	2R		1 / 7	10–5	67%
Cincinnati Open	A	A	A	A	A	A	2R	A	A	1R	A		0 / 2	0–2	0%
Guadalajara Open	NH							3R	A	NTI			0 / 1	2–1	67%
Wuhan Open	A	A	A	A	A	NH				A	Q2		0 / 0	0–0	–
China Open	A	A	A	A	QF	NH			A	A	1R		0 / 2	3–2	60%
Win–loss	0–0	0–0	0–1	0–0	19–2	0–0	7–4	9–4	4–6	0–2	5–3	1–2	2 / 27	45–24	65%
Career statistics
	2015	2016	2017	2018	2019	2020	2021	2022	2023	2024	2025	2026	SR	W–L	Win %
Tournaments	0	0	4	0 (Note: During the season, she did not play in the main draw of any tour-level tournaments. However, she played at the Billie Jean King Cup, which is not counted as a played tournament but matches counted.)	10	0	13	12	16	10	9	4	Career total: 78		
Titles	0	0	0	0	3	0	0	0	0	0	0	0	Career total: 3		
Finals	0	0	0	0	4	0	1	1	0	1	0	0	Career total: 7		
Hard win–loss	0–0	0–0	8–4	0–2	34–7	0–0	14–8	8–6	9–9	2–5	4–3	0–2	3 / 45	79–46	63%
Clay win–loss	0–0	0–0	0–0	0–0	3–0	0–0	2–1	7–4	2–3	3–2	4–3	2–2	0 / 17	23–15	61%
Grass win–loss	0–0	0–0	0–1	0–0	0–0	0–0	1–3	5–3	4–4	6–3	2–2	0–0	0 / 16	18–16	53%
Overall win–loss	0–0	0–0	8–5	0–2	37–7	0–0	17–12	20–13	15–16	11–10	10–8	2–4	3 / 78	120–77	61%
Win %	–	–	62%	0%	84%	–	59%	61%	48%	52%	56%	33%	Career total: 61%		
Year–end ranking	633	306	182	178	5	7	46	45	92	132	227		$9,894,984		

=== Doubles ===
Tournament	2019	...	2022	SR	W–L	Win %
Australian Open	A		A	0 / 0	0–0	–
French Open	A		A	0 / 0	0–0	–
Wimbledon	A		A	0 / 0	0–0	–
US Open	1R		A	0 / 1	0–1	0%
Win–loss	0–1		0–0	0 / 1	0–1	0%

== Grand Slam tournament finals ==
=== Singles: 1 (title) ===
Result	Year	Championship	Surface	Opponent	Score
Win	2019	US Open	Hard	(United States) Serena Williams	6–3, 7–5

=== Mixed doubles: 1 (runner-up) ===
Result	Year	Championship	Surface	Partner	Opponents	Score
Loss	2023	French Open	Clay	(New Zealand) Michael Venus	(Japan) Miyu Kato (Germany) Tim Pütz	6–4, 4–6, [6–10]

== Other significant finals ==
=== WTA 1000 tournaments ===
==== Singles: 3 (2 titles, 1 runner-up) ====
Result	Year	Tournament	Surface	Opponent	Score
Win	2019	Indian Wells Open	Hard	(Germany) Angelique Kerber	6–4, 3–6, 6–4
Win	2019	Canadian Open	Hard	(United States) Serena Williams	3–1 ret.
Loss	2021	Miami Open	Hard	(Australia) Ashleigh Barty	3–6, 0–4 ret.

== WTA Tour finals ==
=== Singles: 7 (3 titles, 4 runner-ups) ===
Legend Grand Slam (1–0) WTA 1000 (2–1) WTA 500 (0–0) WTA 250 (0–3)	Finals by surface Hard (3–2) Clay (0–0) Grass (0–2) Carpet (0–0)	Finals by setting Outdoors (3–4) Indoors (0–0)

Result	W–L	Date	Tournament	Tier	Surface	Opponent	Score
Loss	0–1	Jan 2019	Auckland Open, New Zealand	International (Note: The WTA International tournaments were reclassified as WTA 250 tournaments in 2021.)	Hard	(Germany) Julia Görges	6–2, 5–7, 1–6
Win	1–1	Mar 2019	Indian Wells Open, United States	Premier M (Note: The WTA Premier 5 & Mandatory tournaments were reclassified as WTA 1000 tournaments in 2021.)	Hard	(Germany) Angelique Kerber	6–4, 3–6, 6–4
Win	2–1	Aug 2019	Canadian Open, Canada	Premier 5	Hard	(United States) Serena Williams	3–1 ret.
Win	3–1	Sep 2019	US Open, United States	Grand Slam	Hard	(United States) Serena Williams	6–3, 7–5
Loss	3–2	Apr 2021	Miami Open, United States	WTA 1000	Hard	(Australia) Ashleigh Barty	3–6, 0–4 ret.
Loss	3–3	Jun 2022	Bad Homburg Open, Germany	WTA 250	Grass	(France) Caroline Garcia	7–6^{(7–5)}, 4–6, 4–6
Loss	3–4	Jun 2024	Rosmalen Open, Netherlands	WTA 250	Grass	Liudmila Samsonova	6–4, 3–6, 5–7

=== Doubles: 1 (runner-up) ===
Legend Grand Slam WTA 1000 WTA 500 WTA 250 (0–1)	Finals by surface Hard (0–0) Grass (0–0) Clay (0–0) Carpet (0–1)	Finals by setting Outdoors (0–0) Indoors (0–1)

Result	W–L	Date	Tournament	Tier	Surface	Partner	Opponents	Score
Loss	0–1	Sep 2017	Tournoi de Québec, Canada	International	Carpet (i)	(Canada) Carson Branstine	(Hungary) Tímea Babos (Czech Republic) Andrea Hlaváčková	3–6, 1–6

== Team competition finals ==
Result	Date	Tournament	Surface	Team	Partner(s)	Opponent team	Opponent players	Score
Win	Jul 2025	Hopman Cup	Hard	Canada	Félix Auger-Aliassime	Italy	Flavio Cobolli; Lucia Bronzetti	2–1

== WTA 125 finals ==
=== Singles: 6 (4 titles, 2 runner-ups) ===
Result	W–L	Date	Tournament	Surface	Opponent	Score
Win	1–0	Jan 2019	Newport Beach Challenger, United States	Hard	(United States) Jessica Pegula	0–6, 6–4, 6–2
Loss	1–1	Mar 2026	Austin Challenger, United States	Hard	(Thailand) Lanlana Tararudee	3–6, 6–3, 3–6
Win	2–1	Oct 2026	Internazionali di Rovereto, Italy	Hard (i)	(Czech Republic) Dominika Šalková	7–6^{(7–2)}, 6–2
Win	3–1	Nov 2026	Querétaro Open, Mexico	Clay	(Germany) Tatjana Maria	6–1, 2–6, 6–3
Loss	3–2	Nov 2026	Cali Open, Colombia	Clay	(Spain) Leyre Romero Gormaz	6–7^{(4–7)}, 3–6
Win	4–2	Nov 2026	Cundinamarca Open, Colombia	Clay	(United States) Elizabeth Mandlik	6–3, 6–3

=== Doubles: 1 (title) ===
Result	W–L	Date	Tournament	Surface	Partner	Opponents	Score
Win	1–0	Apr 2025	Catalonia Open, Spain	Clay	(Indonesia) Aldila Sutjiadi	(Canada) Leylah Fernandez (New Zealand) Lulu Sun	6–2, 6–4

== ITF Circuit finals ==
=== Singles: 11 (7 titles, 4 runner-ups) ===
Legend $50/60,000 tournaments (1–1) $25/30,000 tournaments (6–3)	Finals by surface Hard (5–4) Clay (1–0)	Finals by setting Outdoors (6–3) Indoors (0–1)

Result	W–L	Date	Tournament	Tier	Surface	Opponent	Score
Loss	0–1	Jul 2015	Challenger de Gatineau, Canada	25,000	Hard	(United States) Alexa Glatch	4–6, 3–6
Win	1–1	Aug 2016	Challenger de Gatineau, Canada	25,000	Hard	(United States) Elizabeth Halbauer	6–2, 7–5
Loss	1–2	Oct 2016	Challenger de Saguenay, Canada	50,000	Hard (i)	(United States) CiCi Bellis	4–6, 2–6
Win	2–2	Feb 2017	Rancho Santa Fe Open, United States	25,000	Hard	(United States) Kayla Day	6–4, 6–1
Win	3–2	Mar 2017	ITF Santa Margherita di Pula, Italy	25,000	Clay	(United States) Bernarda Pera	6–7^{(8–10)}, 6–2, 7–6^{(10–8)}
Loss	3–3	Apr 2018	Kōfu International Open, Japan	25,000	Hard	(Thailand) Luksika Kumkhum	3–6, 3–6
Loss	3–4	Apr 2018	ITF Kashiwa, Japan	25,000	Hard	(Thailand) Luksika Kumkhum	3–6, 6–7^{(4–7)}
Win	4–4	Oct 2018	ITF Florence, United States	25,000	Hard	(Japan) Mari Osaka	6–4, 2–6, 6–3
Win	5–4	Nov 2018	ITF Norman, United States	25,000	Hard	(Colombia) Camila Osorio	6–1, 6–0
Win	6–4	Jan 2026	ITF Bradenton, United States	35,000	Hard	(United States) Vivian Wolff	6–2, 7–5
Win	7–4	Jan 2026	Vero Beach International Open, United States	60,000	Clay	(China) You Xiaodi	7–5, 6–1

=== Doubles: 4 (3 titles, 1 runner-up) ===
Legend $50/60,000 tournaments (1–1) $25,000 tournaments (2–0)	Finals by surface Hard (3–1) Clay (0–0)	Finals by setting Outdoors (2–0) Indoors (1–1)

Result	W–L	Date	Tournament	Tier	Surface	Partner	Opponents	Score
Win	1–0	Aug 2016	Challenger de Gatineau, Canada	25,000	Hard	(Canada) Charlotte Robillard-Millette	(Japan) Mana Ayukawa (United Kingdom) Samantha Murray	4–6, 6–4, [10–6]
Loss	1–1	Oct 2016	Challenger de Saguenay, Canada	50,000	Hard (i)	(Canada) Charlotte Robillard-Millette	(Romania) Elena Bogdan (Romania) Mihaela Buzărnescu	4–6, 7–6^{(7–4)}, [6–10]
Win	2–1	Oct 2017	Challenger de Saguenay, Canada	60,000	Hard (i)	(Canada) Carol Zhao	(United States) Francesca Di Lorenzo (New Zealand) Erin Routliffe	w/o
Win	3–1	Jul 2018	Challenger de Gatineau, Canada	25,000	Hard	(Canada) Carson Branstine	(Chinese Taipei) Hsu Chieh-yu (Mexico) Marcela Zacarías	4–6, 6–2, [10–4]

== Junior Grand Slam tournament finals ==
=== Doubles: 2 (2 titles) ===
Result	Date	Tournament	Surface	Partner	Opponents	Score
Win	2017	Australian Open	Hard	(United States) Carson Branstine	(Poland) Maja Chwalińska (Poland) Iga Świątek	6–1, 7–6^{(7–4)}
Win	2017	French Open	Clay	(Canada) Carson Branstine	(Russia) Olesya Pervushina (Russia) Anastasia Potapova	6–1, 6–3

== WTA Tour career earnings ==
current as of 23 May 2022

Year	Grand Slam titles	WTA titles	Total titles	Earnings ($)	Money list rank
2015	0	0	0	4,651	768
2016	0	0	0	15,465	426
2017	0	0	0	102,607	200
2018	0	0	0	93,165	236
2019	1	2	3	6,504,150	4
2020	absent
2021	0	0	0	804,694	39
2022	0	0	0	672,731	59
2023	0	0	0	758,434	58
2024	0	0	0	485,335	120
2025	0	0	0	193,280	171
Career	1	2	3	9,635,413	81

== Career Grand Slam statistics ==
=== Seedings ===
The tournaments won by Andreescu are in boldface, and advanced into finals are in italics.

Season	Australian Open	French Open	Wimbledon	US Open
2017	did not play	did not qualify	qualifier	did not qualify
2018	did not qualify	did not qualify	did not qualify	did not qualify
2019	qualifier	22nd	did not play	**15th (1)**
2020	did not play	did not play	cancelled	did not play
2021	8th	6th	5th	6th
2022	did not play	protected ranking	not seeded	not seeded
2023	not seeded	not seeded	not seeded	did not play
2024	did not play	protected ranking	protected ranking	wild card
2025	did not play	did not qualify	did not qualify	did not play
2026	did not play	did not qualify	not seeded	did not qualify

=== Best Grand Slam tournament results details ===
Australian Open
2019 Australian Open (qualifier)
Round	Opponent	Rank	Score
Q1	(United Kingdom) Katie Swan	175	6–1, ret.
Q2	(Greece) Valentini Grammatikopoulou	173	6–4, 6–1
Q3	(Czech Republic) Tereza Smitková (26)	137	6–2, 6–1
1R	(United States) Whitney Osuigwe	198	7–6^{(7–1)}, 6–7^{(0–7)}, 6–3
2R	(Latvia) Anastasija Sevastova (13)	12	3–6, 6–3, 2–6
2021 Australian Open (8th seed)
1R	(Romania) Mihaela Buzărnescu (LL)	138	6–2, 4–6, 6–3
2R	(Chinese Taipei) Hsieh Su-wei	71	3–6, 2–6
2023 Australian Open (unseeded)
1R	(Czech Republic) Marie Bouzková (25)	26	6–2, 6–4
2R	(Spain) Cristina Bucșa (Q)	100	6–2, 6–7^{(7–9)}, 4–6

Wimbledon Championships
2023 Wimbledon (unseeded)
Round	Opponent	Rank	Score
1R	(Hungary) Anna Bondár	110	6–3, 3–6, 6–2
2R	(Ukraine) Anhelina Kalinina (26)	26	6–2, 4–6, 7–6^{(10–7)}
3R	(Tunisia) Ons Jabeur (6)	6	6–3, 3–6, 4–6
2024 Wimbledon (protected ranking)
Round	Opponent	Rank	Score
1R	(Romania) Jaqueline Cristian	62	6–4, 6–2
2R	(Czech Republic) Linda Nosková (26)	26	6–3, 7–6^{(7–5)}
3R	(Italy) Jasmine Paolini (7)	7	6–7^{(4–7)}, 1–6

French Open
2023 French Open (unseeded)
Round	Opponent	Rank	Score
1R	Victoria Azarenka (18)	18	2–6, 6–3, 6–4
2R	(United States) Emma Navarro (WC)	75	6–1, 6–4
3R	(Ukraine) Lesia Tsurenko	66	1–6, 1–6
2024 French Open (protected ranking)
Round	Opponent	Rank	Score
1R	(Spain) Sara Sorribes Tormo	43	7–5, 6–1
2R	Anna Kalinskaya (23)	25	1–6, 7–5, 6–3
3R	(Italy) Jasmine Paolini (12)	15	1–6, 6–3, 0–6

US Open
2019 US Open (15th seed)
Round	Opponent	Rank	Score
1R	(United States) Katie Volynets (WC)	413	6–2, 6–4
2R	(Belgium) Kirsten Flipkens (LL)	110	6–3, 7–5
3R	(Denmark) Caroline Wozniacki (19)	19	6–4, 6–4
4R	(United States) Taylor Townsend (Q)	116	6–1, 4–6, 6–2
QF	(Belgium) Elise Mertens (25)	26	3–6, 6–2, 6–3
SF	(Switzerland) Belinda Bencic (13)	12	7–6^{(7–3)}, 7–5
**W**	(United States) Serena Williams (8)	8	6–3, 7–5

== Top 10 wins ==
Andreescu has a 12–16 (43%) record against players who were, at the time the match was played, ranked in the top 10.

Season	2019	...	2022	2023	2024	2025	Total
Wins	8		2	1	1	0	12

#	Opponent	Rk	Tournament	Surface	Rd	Score	BAR	Ref
2019
1.	(Denmark) Caroline Wozniacki	No. 3	Auckland Open, New Zealand	Hard	2R	6–4, 6–4	No. 152	
2.	(Ukraine) Elina Svitolina	No. 6	Indian Wells Open, United States	Hard	SF	6–3, 2–6, 6–4	No. 60	
3.	(Germany) Angelique Kerber	No. 8	Indian Wells Open, United States	Hard	F	6–4, 3–6, 6–4	No. 60	
4.	(Germany) Angelique Kerber	No. 4	Miami Open, United States	Hard	3R	6–4, 4–6, 6–1	No. 24	
5.	(Netherlands) Kiki Bertens	No. 5	Canadian Open, Canada	Hard	3R	6–1, 6–7^{(7–9)}, 6–4	No. 27	
6.	(Czech Republic) Karolína Plíšková	No. 3	Canadian Open, Canada	Hard	QF	6–0, 2–6, 6–4	No. 27	
7.	(United States) Serena Williams	No. 10	Canadian Open, Canada	Hard	F	3–1, ret.	No. 27	
8.	(United States) Serena Williams	No. 8	US Open, United States	Hard	F	6–3, 7–5	No. 15	
2022
9.	(United States) Danielle Collins	No. 8	Madrid Open, Spain	Clay	2R	6–1, 6–1	No. 111	
10.	Daria Kasatkina	No. 9	Canadian Open, Canada	Hard	1R	7–6^{(7–5)}, 6–4	No. 53	
2023
11.	(Greece) Maria Sakkari	No. 10	Miami Open, United States	Hard	2R	5–7, 6–3, 6–4	No. 31	
2024
12.	(Brazil) Beatriz Haddad Maia	No. 10	Pan Pacific Open, Japan	Hard	2R	3–0, ret.	No. 159	

== Longest winning streaks ==
=== 17 match win streak (2019) ===
#	Tournament	Category	Start date	Surface	Rd	Opponent	Rank	Score
–	Miami Open	Premier Mandatory	18 March 2019	Hard	4R	(Estonia) Anett Kontaveit (21)	No. 19	1–6, 0–2 ret.
1	French Open	Grand Slam	27 May 2019	Clay	1R	(Czech Republic) Marie Bouzková (LL)	No. 118	5–7, 6–4, 6–4
–	French Open	Grand Slam	27 May 2019	Clay	2R	(United States) Sofia Kenin	No. 35	walkover
2	Canadian Open	Premier 5	5 August 2019	Hard	1R	(Canada) Eugenie Bouchard (WC)	No. 112	4–6, 6–1, 6–4
3	Canadian Open	Premier 5	5 August 2019	Hard	2R	(Russia) Daria Kasatkina	No. 40	5–7, 6–2, 7–5
4	Canadian Open	Premier 5	5 August 2019	Hard	3R	(Netherlands) Kiki Bertens (5)	No. 5	6–1, 6–7^{(7–9)}, 6–4
5	Canadian Open	Premier 5	5 August 2019	Hard	QF	(Czech Republic) Karolína Plíšková (3)	No. 3	6–0, 2–6, 6–4
6	Canadian Open	Premier 5	5 August 2019	Hard	SF	(United States) Sofia Kenin	No. 29	6–4, 7–6^{(7–5)}
7	Canadian Open	Premier 5	5 August 2019	Hard	F	(United States) Serena Williams (8)	No. 10	3–1 ret.
8	US Open	Grand Slam	26 August 2019	Hard	1R	(United States) Katie Volynets (WC)	No. 413	6–2, 6–4
9	US Open	Grand Slam	26 August 2019	Hard	2R	(Belgium) Kirsten Flipkens (LL)	No. 110	6–3, 7–5
10	US Open	Grand Slam	26 August 2019	Hard	3R	(Denmark) Caroline Wozniacki (19)	No. 19	6–4, 6–4
11	US Open	Grand Slam	26 August 2019	Hard	4R	(United States) Taylor Townsend (Q)	No. 116	6–1, 4–6, 6–2
12	US Open	Grand Slam	26 August 2019	Hard	QF	(Belgium) Elise Mertens (25)	No. 26	3–6, 6–2, 6–3
13	US Open	Grand Slam	26 August 2019	Hard	SF	(Switzerland) Belinda Bencic (13)	No. 12	7–6^{(7–3)}, 7–5
14	US Open	Grand Slam	26 August 2019	Hard	F	(United States) Serena Williams (8)	No. 8	6–3, 7–5
15	China Open	Premier Mandatory	30 September 2019	Hard	1R	(Belarus) Aliaksandra Sasnovich	No. 60	6–2, 2–6, 6–1
16	China Open	Premier Mandatory	30 September 2019	Hard	2R	(Belgium) Elise Mertens	No. 23	6–3, 7–6^{(7–5)}
17	China Open	Premier Mandatory	30 September 2019	Hard	3R	(United States) Jennifer Brady (Q)	No. 66	6–1, 6–3
–	China Open	Premier Mandatory	30 September 2019	Hard	QF	(Japan) Naomi Osaka (4)	No. 4	7–5, 3–6, 4–6
