= 2023 China Open – Men's doubles =

Men's doubles
- 2023 China Open

Final
- Champions: (Croatia) Ivan Dodig (United States) Austin Krajicek
- Runners-up: (Netherlands) Wesley Koolhof (United Kingdom) Neal Skupski
- Score: 6–7^{(12–14)}, 6–3, [10–5]

Events
Singles	men	women
Doubles	men	women
← 2019 ·	China Open	· 2024 →

Defending champion Ivan Dodig and his partner, Austin Krajicek, defeated Wesley Koolhof and Neal Skupski in the final, 6–7^{(12–14)}, 6–3, [10–5] to win the men's doubles tennis title at the 2023 China Open. It was their fifth ATP Tour title of the season, and their eighth overall. Koolhof and Skupski were contending for their third title of the year.

Dodig and Filip Polášek were the reigning champions from 2019, when the tournament was last held, but Polášek did not participate this year.

== Seeds ==
1. (Croatia) Ivan Dodig / (United States) Austin Krajicek (champions)
2. (Netherlands) Wesley Koolhof / (United Kingdom) Neal Skupski (final)
3. (Argentina) Máximo González / (Argentina) Andrés Molteni (first round)
4. (Mexico) Santiago González / (France) Édouard Roger-Vasselin (semifinals)

== Draw ==
=== Key ===
- Q = Qualifier
- WC = Wild card
- LL = Lucky loser
- Alt = Alternate
- SE = Special exempt
- PR = Protected ranking
- ITF = ITF entry
- JE = Junior exempt
- w/o = Walkover
- r = Retired
- d = Defaulted
- SR = Special ranking

=== Draw ===
First round
1	(Croatia) I Dodig (United States) A Krajicek	6	6
(Germany) K Krawietz (Germany) T Pütz	2	4
(El Salvador) M Arévalo (Croatia) N Mektić	6	3	[9]
PR	(Brazil) M Melo (Germany) A Zverev	2	6	[11]
4	(Mexico) S González (France) É Roger-Vasselin	6	6
(Argentina) TM Etcheverry (Chile) N Jarry	2	2
(Spain) M Granollers (Argentina) H Zeballos	7^{7}	6
(Australia) A de Minaur (Italy) J Sinner	6^{2}	3
WC	(China) J Cui (China) A Wang	4	5
K Khachanov; A Rublev	6	7
Q	(Austria) A Erler (Austria) L Miedler	6	6
3	(Argentina) M González (Argentina) A Molteni	4	4
(Monaco) H Nys (Poland) J Zieliński	7^{7}	6
(Belgium) S Gillé (Belgium) J Vliegen	6^{5}	4
WC	(China) F Sun (China) Y Zhou	1	4
2	(Netherlands) W Koolhof (United Kingdom) N Skupski	6	6

Quarterfinals
1	(Croatia) I Dodig (United States) A Krajicek	7^{7}	4	[11]
PR	(Brazil) M Melo (Germany) A Zverev	6^{5}	6	[9]
4	(Mexico) S González (France) É Roger-Vasselin	6^{5}	7^{7}	[10]
(Spain) M Granollers (Argentina) H Zeballos	7^{7}	6^{5}	[5]
K Khachanov; A Rublev	7	7^{7}
Q	(Austria) A Erler (Austria) L Miedler	5	6^{4}
(Monaco) H Nys (Poland) J Zieliński	2	3
2	(Netherlands) W Koolhof (United Kingdom) N Skupski	6	6

Semifinals
1	(Croatia) I Dodig (United States) A Krajicek	4	7	[10]
4	(Mexico) S González (France) É Roger-Vasselin	6	5	[6]
K Khachanov; A Rublev	6^{3}	2
2	(Netherlands) W Koolhof (United Kingdom) N Skupski	7^{7}	6

Final
1	(Croatia) I Dodig (United States) A Krajicek	6^{12}	6	[10]
2	(Netherlands) W Koolhof (United Kingdom) N Skupski	7^{14}	3	[5]

== Qualifying ==
=== Seeds ===
1. (Austria) Alexander Erler / (Austria) Lucas Miedler (qualified)
2. (India) Anirudh Chandrasekar / (India) Vijay Sundar Prashanth (qualifying competition)

=== Qualifiers ===
1. (Austria) Alexander Erler / (Austria) Lucas Miedler

=== Qualifying draw ===
First round
1	(Austria) Alexander Erler (Austria) Lucas Miedler	6	6
Alt	(China) Li Hanwen (China) Li Zhe	3	2
WC	(China) Gao Xin (China) Sun Qian	2	3
2	(India) Anirudh Chandrasekar (India) Vijay Sundar Prashanth	6	6

Qualifying competition
1	(Austria) Alexander Erler (Austria) Lucas Miedler	6	6
2	(India) Anirudh Chandrasekar (India) Vijay Sundar Prashanth	4	3
