= 2019 China Open – Men's doubles =

Men's doubles
- 2019 China Open

Final
- Champions: (Croatia) Ivan Dodig (Slovakia) Filip Polášek
- Runners-up: (Poland) Łukasz Kubot (Brazil) Marcelo Melo
- Score: 6–3, 7–6^{(7−4)}

Events
Singles	men	women
Doubles	men	women
← 2018 ·	China Open	· 2023 →

Ivan Dodig and Filip Polášek won the tournament by defeating the defending champions Łukasz Kubot and Marcelo Melo in the final, 6−3, 7−6^{(7−4)}.

== Seeds ==
1. (Colombia) Juan Sebastián Cabal / (Colombia) Robert Farah (quarterfinals)
2. (Poland) Łukasz Kubot / (Brazil) Marcelo Melo (final)
3. (South Africa) Raven Klaasen / (New Zealand) Michael Venus (first round)
4. (Germany) Kevin Krawietz / (Germany) Andreas Mies (first round)

== Draw ==
=== Key ===
- Q = Qualifier
- WC = Wild card
- LL = Lucky loser
- Alt = Alternate
- SE = Special exempt
- PR = Protected ranking
- ITF = ITF entry
- JE = Junior exempt
- w/o = Walkover
- r = Retired
- d = Defaulted
- SR = Special ranking

=== Draw ===
First round
1	(Colombia) JS Cabal (Colombia) R Farah	6	0	[16]
(Netherlands) W Koolhof (Greece) S Tsitsipas	3	6	[14]
(Argentina) G Pella (Argentina) D Schwartzman	4	6^{6}
(United Kingdom) J Murray (United Kingdom) N Skupski	6	7^{8}
3	(South Africa) R Klaasen (New Zealand) M Venus	1	7	[5]
(Croatia) I Dodig (Slovakia) F Polášek	6	5	[10]
WC	(China) X Gao (China) R Hua	4	5
(Italy) F Fognini (Austria) D Thiem	6	7
(Canada) F Auger-Aliassime (Italy) M Berrettini	7^{7}	2	[8]
(Russia) K Khachanov (Russia) A Rublev	6^{2}	6	[10]
(United States) J Isner (Germany) A Zverev	4	7	[10]
4	(Germany) K Krawietz (Germany) A Mies	6	5	[7]
WC	(China) M Gong (China) Ze Zhang	4	6	[10]
(Finland) H Kontinen (Australia) J Peers	6	4	[7]
Q	(United Kingdom) K Edmund (United Kingdom) D Evans	4	3
2	(Poland) Ł Kubot (Brazil) M Melo	6	6

Quarterfinals
1	(Colombia) JS Cabal (Colombia) R Farah	4	2
(United Kingdom) J Murray (United Kingdom) N Skupski	6	6
(Croatia) I Dodig (Slovakia) F Polášek	6	6
(Italy) F Fognini (Austria) D Thiem	4	4
(Russia) K Khachanov (Russia) A Rublev	6	3	[10]
(United States) J Isner (Germany) A Zverev	4	6	[8]
WC	(China) M Gong (China) Ze Zhang	1	5
2	(Poland) Ł Kubot (Brazil) M Melo	6	7

Semifinals
(United Kingdom) J Murray (United Kingdom) N Skupski	4	4
(Croatia) I Dodig (Slovakia) F Polášek	6	6
(Russia) K Khachanov (Russia) A Rublev	5	5
2	(Poland) Ł Kubot (Brazil) M Melo	7	7

Final
(Croatia) I Dodig (Slovakia) F Polášek	6	7^{7}
2	(Poland) Ł Kubot (Brazil) M Melo	3	6^{4}

== Qualifying ==
=== Seeds ===
1. (Sweden) Robert Lindstedt / (United States) Sam Querrey (qualifying competition)
2. (Uruguay) Pablo Cuevas / (Spain) Fernando Verdasco (first round)

=== Qualifiers ===
1. (United Kingdom) Kyle Edmund / (United Kingdom) Dan Evans

=== Qualifying draw ===
First round
1	(Sweden) Robert Lindstedt (United States) Sam Querrey	6	7
WC	(China) Cui Jie (China) He Yecong	4	5
(United Kingdom) Kyle Edmund (United Kingdom) Dan Evans	6	7^{7}
2	(Uruguay) Pablo Cuevas (Spain) Fernando Verdasco	4	6^{5}

Qualifying competition
1	(Sweden) Robert Lindstedt (United States) Sam Querrey	5	2
(United Kingdom) Kyle Edmund (United Kingdom) Dan Evans	7	6
