= 2019 China Open (tennis) =

- Date: 30 September – 6 October
- Edition: 21st (ATP) / 23rd (WTA)
- Category: ATP Tour 500 (men); Premier Mandatory (women)
- Prize money: ATP $3,666,275; WTA $8,285,274
- Surface: Hard
- Location: Beijing, China
- Venue: National Tennis Center

Champions

Men's singles
- (Austria) Dominic Thiem

Women's singles
- (Japan) Naomi Osaka

Men's doubles
- (Croatia) Ivan Dodig / (Slovakia) Filip Polášek

Women's doubles
- (United States) Sofia Kenin / (United States) Bethanie Mattek-Sands
← 2018 ·	China Open (tennis)	· 2023 →

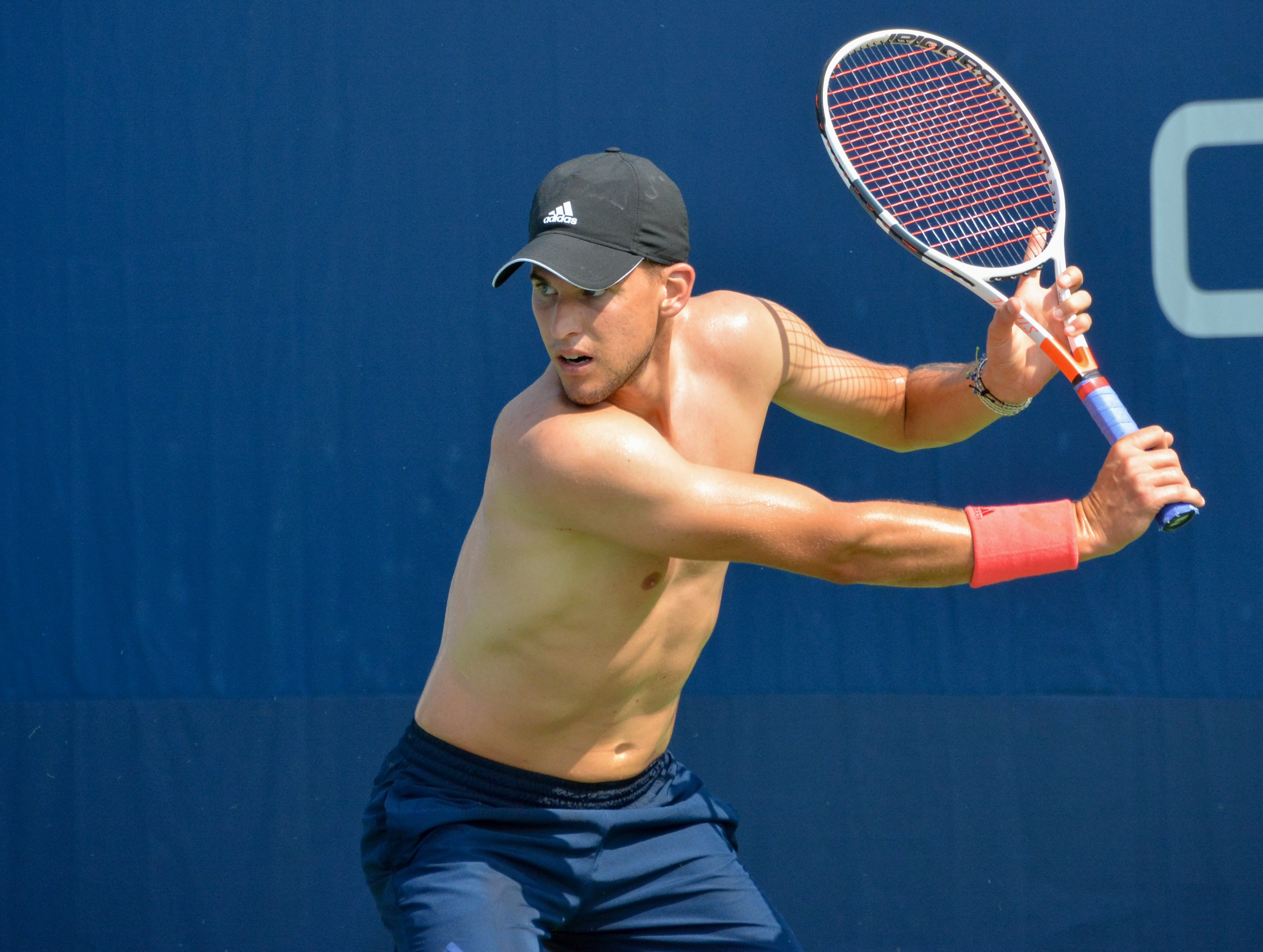
Men's singles champion Dominic Thiem

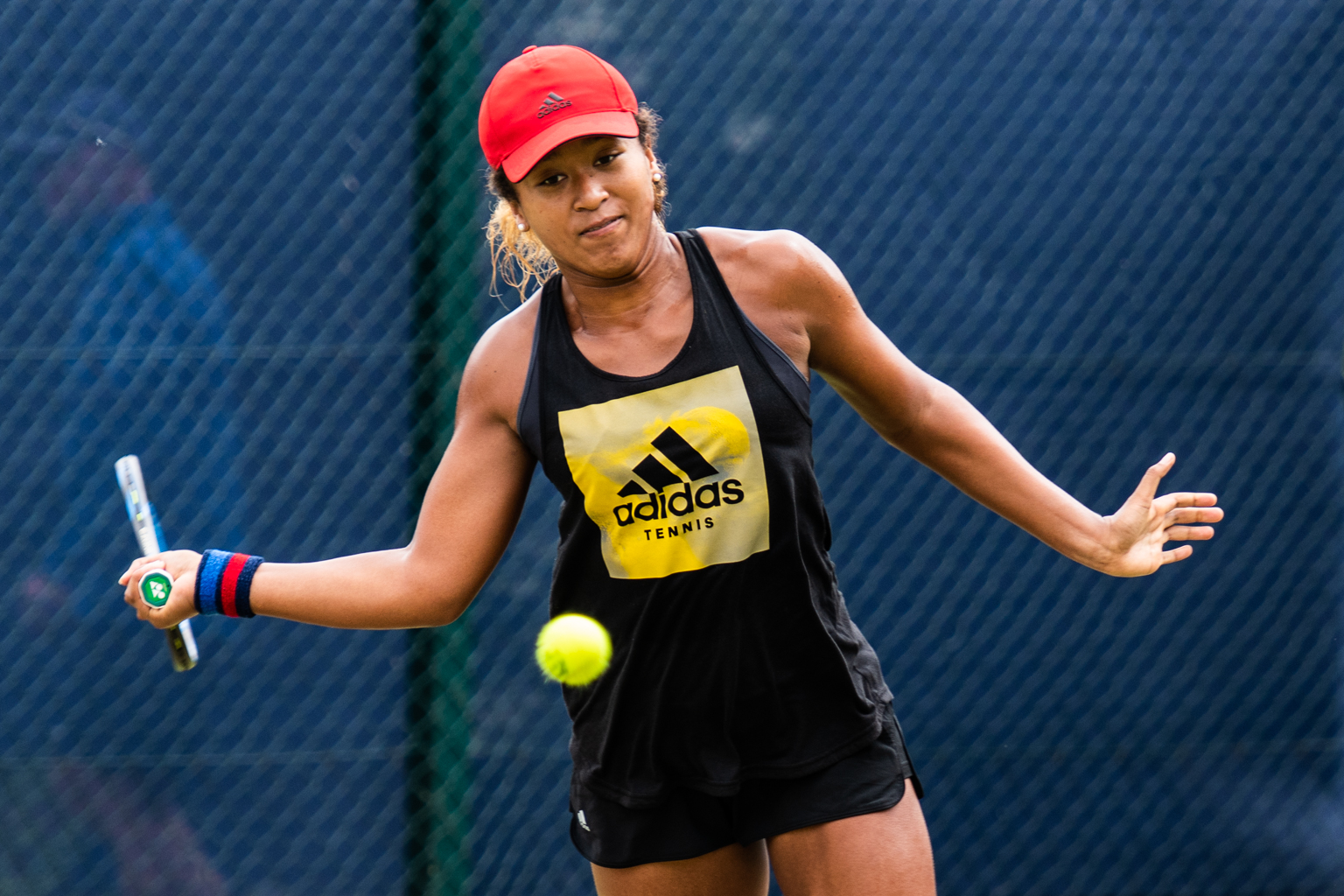
Women's singles champion Naomi Osaka

The 2019 China Open was a tennis tournament being played on outdoor hard courts. It was the 21st edition of the China Open for the men and the 23rd for the women. It was part of the ATP Tour 500 series on the 2019 ATP Tour, and the last WTA Premier Mandatory tournament of the 2019 WTA Tour. Both the men's and the women's events were held at the National Tennis Center in Beijing, China, from September 30 to October 6, 2019. This was also the last edition of the China Open held to date as not being held in 2020 and 2021 due to the COVID-19 pandemic in China.

== Points and prize money ==
=== Point distribution ===
Event	W	F	SF	QF	Round of 16	Round of 32	Round of 64	Q	Q2	Q1
Men's singles	500	300	180	90	45	0	—	20	10	0
Men's doubles	500	300	180	90	0	—	—	45	25	0
Women's singles	1,000	650	390	215	120	65	10	30	20	2
Women's doubles	1,000	650	390	215	120	10	—	—	—	—

=== Prize money ===
Event	W	F	SF	QF	Round of 16	Round of 32	Round of 64	Q2	Q1
Men's singles	$733,990	$364,615	$183,975	$94,680	$48,325	$26,735	—	$10,280	$5,140
Men's doubles	$228,110	$111,660	$56,010	$28,740	$14,840	—	—	—	—
Women's singles	$1,523,265	$762,265	$371,915	$178,665	$85,980	$41,625	$23,915	$6,365	$3,700
Women's doubles	$515,355	$258,600	$115,125	$53,130	$24,800	$11,515	—	—	—

== ATP singles main-draw entrants ==
=== Seeds ===
Country	Player	Rank^{1}	Seed
AUT	Dominic Thiem	5	1
GER	Alexander Zverev	6	2
GRE	Stefanos Tsitsipas	7	3
RUS	Karen Khachanov	9	4
ESP	Roberto Bautista Agut	10	5
ITA	Fabio Fognini	11	6
FRA	Gaël Monfils	12	7
ITA	Matteo Berrettini	13	8

- ^{1} Rankings are as of September 23, 2019

=== Other entrants ===
The following players received wildcards into the singles main draw:

- (China) Li Zhe
- (United States) Frances Tiafoe
- (China) Zhang Zhizhen

The following player received an entry using a protected ranking:

- (United Kingdom) Andy Murray

The following player received entry as a special exempt:

- (Spain) Albert Ramos Viñolas

The following players received entry from the qualifying draw:

- (France) Jérémy Chardy
- (Uruguay) Pablo Cuevas
- (United Kingdom) Dan Evans
- (United Kingdom) Cameron Norrie

=== Withdrawals ===
- (Australia) Nick Kyrgios → replaced by (United States) Sam Querrey
- (Russia) Daniil Medvedev → replaced by (Kazakhstan) Mikhail Kukushkin

=== Retirements ===
- (Chile) Cristian Garín

== ATP doubles main-draw entrants ==
=== Seeds ===
Country	Player	Country	Player	Rank^{1}	Seed
COL	Juan Sebastián Cabal	COL	Robert Farah	2	1
POL	Łukasz Kubot	BRA	Marcelo Melo	9	2
RSA	Raven Klaasen	NZL	Michael Venus	18	3
GER	Kevin Krawietz	GER	Andreas Mies	26	4

- Rankings are as of September 23, 2019

=== Other entrants ===
The following pairs received wildcards into the doubles main draw:

- (China) Gao Xin / (China) Hua Runhao
- (China) Gong Maoxin / (China) Zhang Ze

The following pair received entry from the qualifying draw:

- (United Kingdom) Kyle Edmund / (United Kingdom) Dan Evans

== WTA singles main-draw entrants ==
=== Seeds ===
The following are the seeded players. Seedings are based on WTA rankings as of 23 September 2019. Rankings and points before are as of 30 September 2019.

Seed	Rank	Player	Points before	Points defending	Points won	Points after	Status
1	1	(Australia) Ashleigh Barty	6,446	0	650	7,096	Runner-up, lost to (Japan) Naomi Osaka [4]
2	2	(Czech Republic) Karolína Plíšková	6,125	120	10	6,015	First round lost to (Latvia) Jeļena Ostapenko [WC]
3	3	(Ukraine) Elina Svitolina	5,320	10	215	5,525	Quarterfinals lost to (Netherlands) Kiki Bertens [8]
4	4	(Japan) Naomi Osaka	5,011	390	1000	5,621	Champion, defeated (Australia) Ashleigh Barty [1]
5	6	(Canada) Bianca Andreescu	4,835	(9)^{†}	215	5,041	Quarterfinals lost to (Japan) Naomi Osaka [4]
6	5	(Romania) Simona Halep	4,907	10	65	4,962	Second round lost to (Russia) Ekaterina Alexandrova
7	7	(Czech Republic) Petra Kvitová	4,571	10	215	4,776	Quarterfinals lost to (Australia) Ashleigh Barty [1]
8	8	(Netherlands) Kiki Bertens	4,225	120	390	4,495	Semifinals lost to (Australia) Ashleigh Barty [1]
9	10	(Switzerland) Belinda Bencic	3,738	10	120	3,848	Third round lost to (Czech Republic) Petra Kvitová [7]
10	13	(Germany) Angelique Kerber	2,830	120	65	2,775	Second round lost to (Slovenia) Polona Hercog
11	15	(United States) Madison Keys	2,767	65	65	2,767	Second round lost to (United States) Jennifer Brady [Q]
12	14	(Belarus) Aryna Sabalenka	2,785	215	65	2,635	Second round lost to (Russia) Daria Kasatkina
13	12	(United States) Sloane Stephens	2,873	120	65	2,818	Second round lost to (China) Zheng Saisai
14	20	(China) Wang Qiang	2,423	390	10	2,043	First round retired against (Australia) Ajla Tomljanović
15	16	(United States) Sofia Kenin	2,600	(105)^{†}	120	2,615	Third round lost to (Ukraine) Elina Svitolina [3]
16	19	(Denmark) Caroline Wozniacki	2,493	1,000	390	1,883	Semifinals lost to (Japan) Naomi Osaka [4]

† The player did not qualify for the tournament in 2018. Accordingly, points for her 16th best result are deducted instead.

The following players would have been seeded, but withdrew before the event.

Rank	Player	Points before	Points defending	Points after	Withdrawal reason
9	(United States) Serena Williams	3,935	0	3,935	Schedule change
11	(United Kingdom) Johanna Konta	3,073	10	3,063	Knee injury

=== Other entrants ===
The following players received wildcards into the singles main draw:

- (Russia) Svetlana Kuznetsova
- (Latvia) Jeļena Ostapenko
- (China) Peng Shuai
- (China) Wang Xinyu
- (China) Wang Xiyu

The following players received entry from the qualifying draw:

- (Russia) Anna Blinkova
- (United States) Jennifer Brady
- (United States) Lauren Davis
- (Poland) Magda Linette
- (United States) Christina McHale
- (United States) Bernarda Pera
- (Sweden) Rebecca Peterson
- (Germany) Andrea Petkovic

=== Withdrawals ===
Before the tournament

- (Belarus) Victoria Azarenka → replaced by (Switzerland) Jil Teichmann
- (United Kingdom) Johanna Konta → replaced by (Russia) Veronika Kudermetova
- (Estonia) Anett Kontaveit → replaced by (United States) Venus Williams
- (Greece) Maria Sakkari → replaced by (Slovenia) Polona Hercog
- (Spain) Carla Suárez Navarro → replaced by (Australia) Ajla Tomljanović
- (Ukraine) Lesia Tsurenko → replaced by (United States) Jessica Pegula
- (Czech Republic) Markéta Vondroušová → replaced by (China) Wang Yafan
- (United States) Serena Williams → replaced by (France) Kristina Mladenovic

=== Retirements ===
- (China) Wang Qiang (cramping)

== WTA doubles main-draw entrants ==
=== Seeds ===
Country	Player	Country	Player	Rank^{1}	Seed
TPE	Hsieh Su-wei	CZE	Barbora Strýcová	6	1
HUN	Tímea Babos	FRA	Kristina Mladenovic	7	2
BEL	Elise Mertens	BLR	Aryna Sabalenka	8	3
CAN	Gabriela Dabrowski	CHN	Xu Yifan	16	4
GER	Anna-Lena Grönefeld	NED	Demi Schuurs	26	5
TPE	Chan Hao-ching	TPE	Latisha Chan	28	6
AUS	Samantha Stosur	CHN	Zhang Shuai	30	7
USA	Nicole Melichar	CZE	Květa Peschke	36	8

- ^{1} Rankings are as of September 23, 2019

=== Other entrants ===
The following pairs received wildcards into the doubles main draw:

- (United States) Sofia Kenin / (United States) Bethanie Mattek-Sands
- (Japan) Makoto Ninomiya / (China) Yang Zhaoxuan
- (China) Peng Shuai / (China) Wang Yafan

== Champions ==
=== Men's singles ===
- (Austria) Dominic Thiem def. (Greece) Stefanos Tsitsipas, 3–6, 6–4, 6–1

=== Women's singles ===
- (Japan) Naomi Osaka def. (Australia) Ashleigh Barty, 3–6, 6–3, 6–2

=== Men's doubles ===
- (Croatia) Ivan Dodig / (Slovakia) Filip Polášek def. (Poland) Łukasz Kubot / (Brazil) Marcelo Melo, 6–3, 7–6^{(7–4)}

=== Women's doubles ===
- (United States) Sofia Kenin / (United States) Bethanie Mattek-Sands def. (Latvia) Jeļena Ostapenko / (Ukraine) Dayana Yastremska, 6–3, 6–7^{(5–7)}, [10–7]
