= 2021 WTA Tour =

Women's tennis circuit

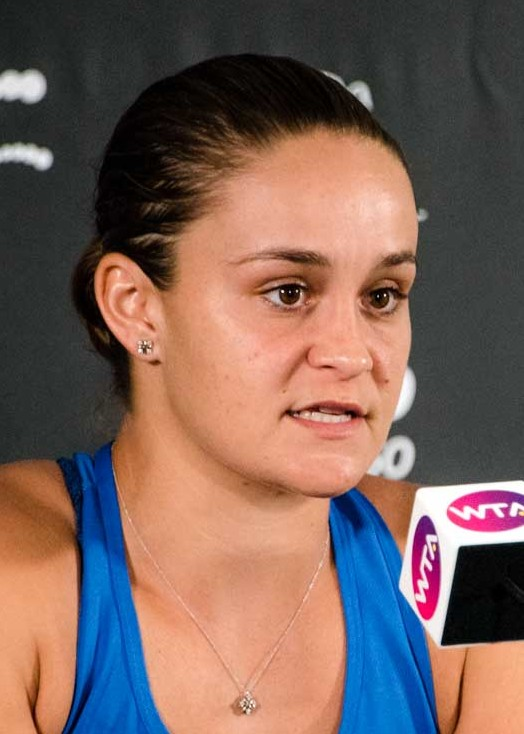
- Ashleigh Barty finished the year as world No. 1 for the third time in her career. She won five tournaments during the season, including a major at the Wimbledon Championships. She also won two WTA 1000 events.

Details
- Duration: 6 January – 17 November 2021
- Edition: 51st
- Tournaments: 57
- Categories: Grand Slam (4); WTA Finals; Summer Olympics; WTA 1000 (7); WTA 500 (15); WTA 250 (29)

Achievements (singles)
- Most titles: (Australia) Ashleigh Barty (5)
- Most finals: (Estonia) Anett Kontaveit (7)
- Prize money leader: (Australia) Ashleigh Barty ($3,945,182)
- Points leader: (Australia) Ashleigh Barty (6,411)

Awards
- Player of the year: (Australia) Ashleigh Barty
- Doubles team of the year: (Czech Republic) Barbora Krejčíková (Czech Republic) Kateřina Siniaková
- Most improved player of the year: (Czech Republic) Barbora Krejčíková
- Newcomer of the year: (United Kingdom) Emma Raducanu
- Comeback player of the year: (Spain) Carla Suárez Navarro

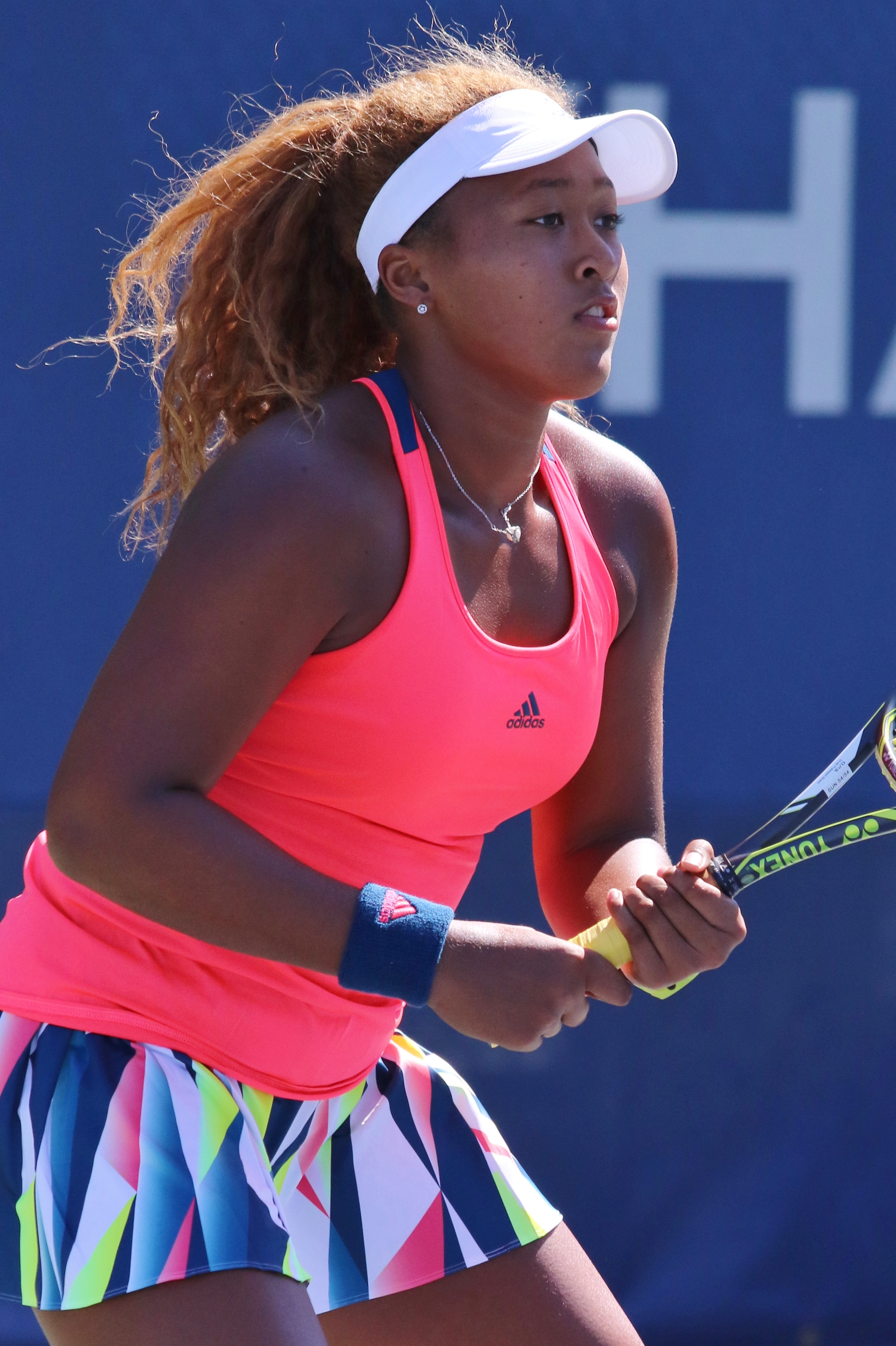
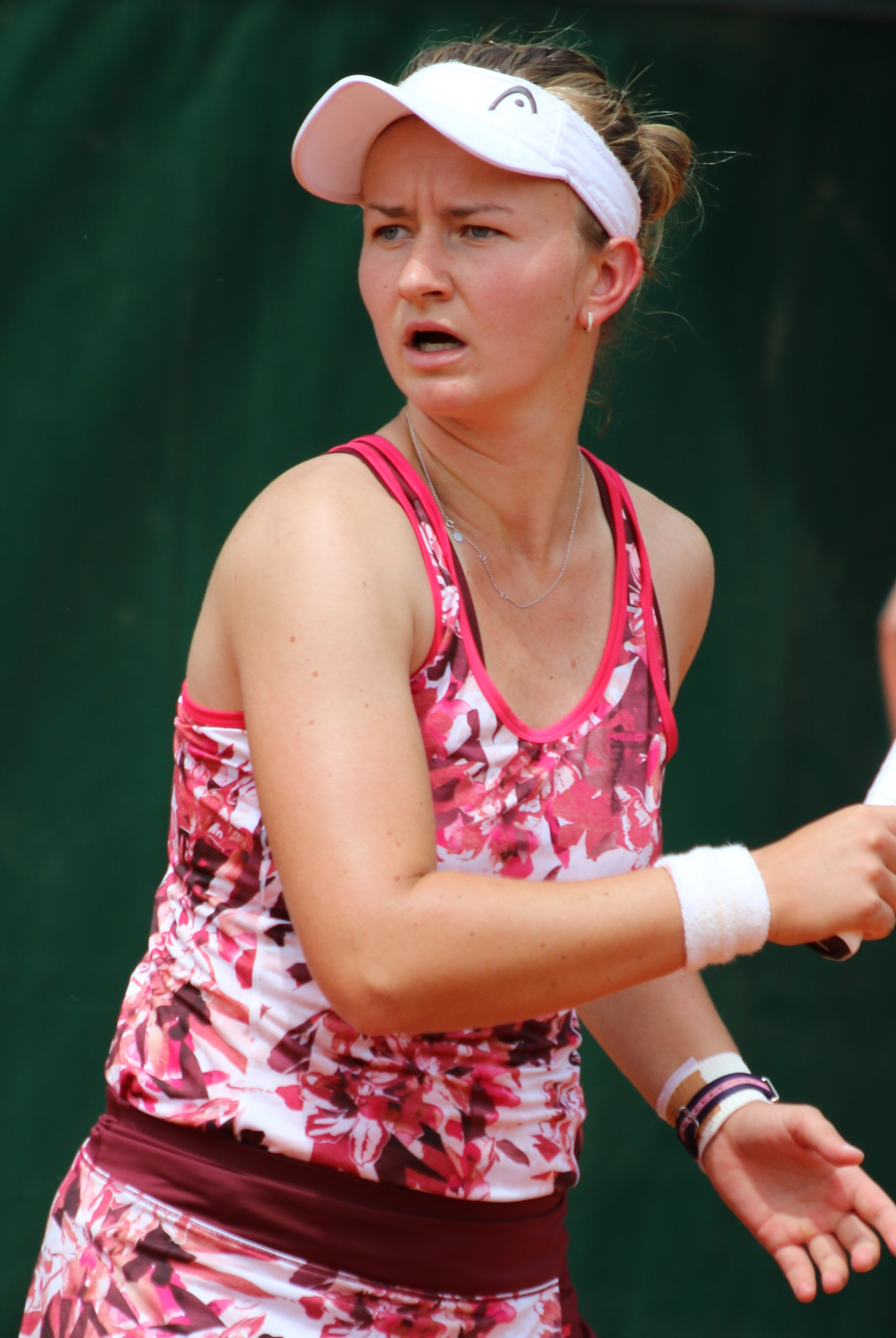
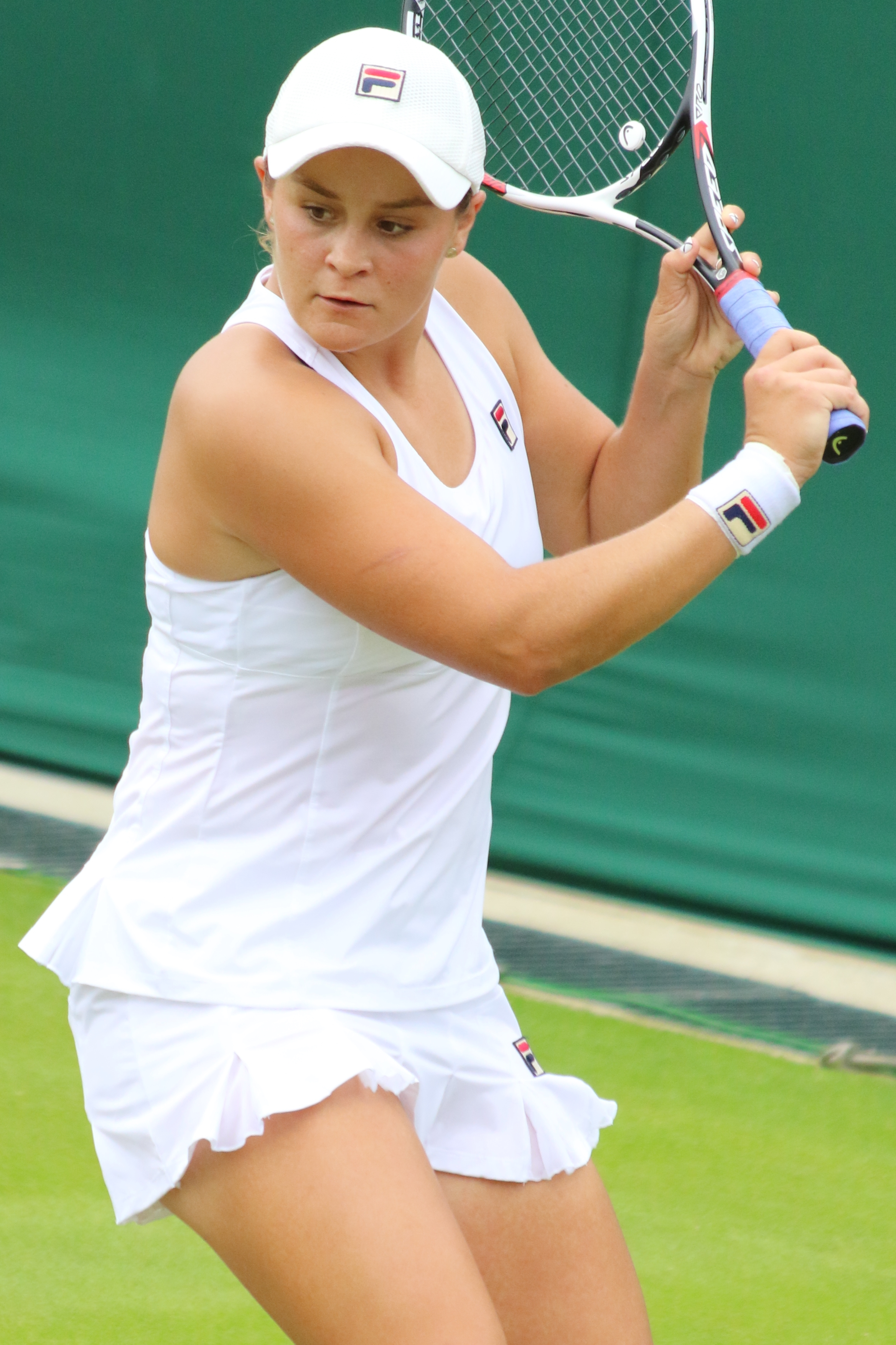
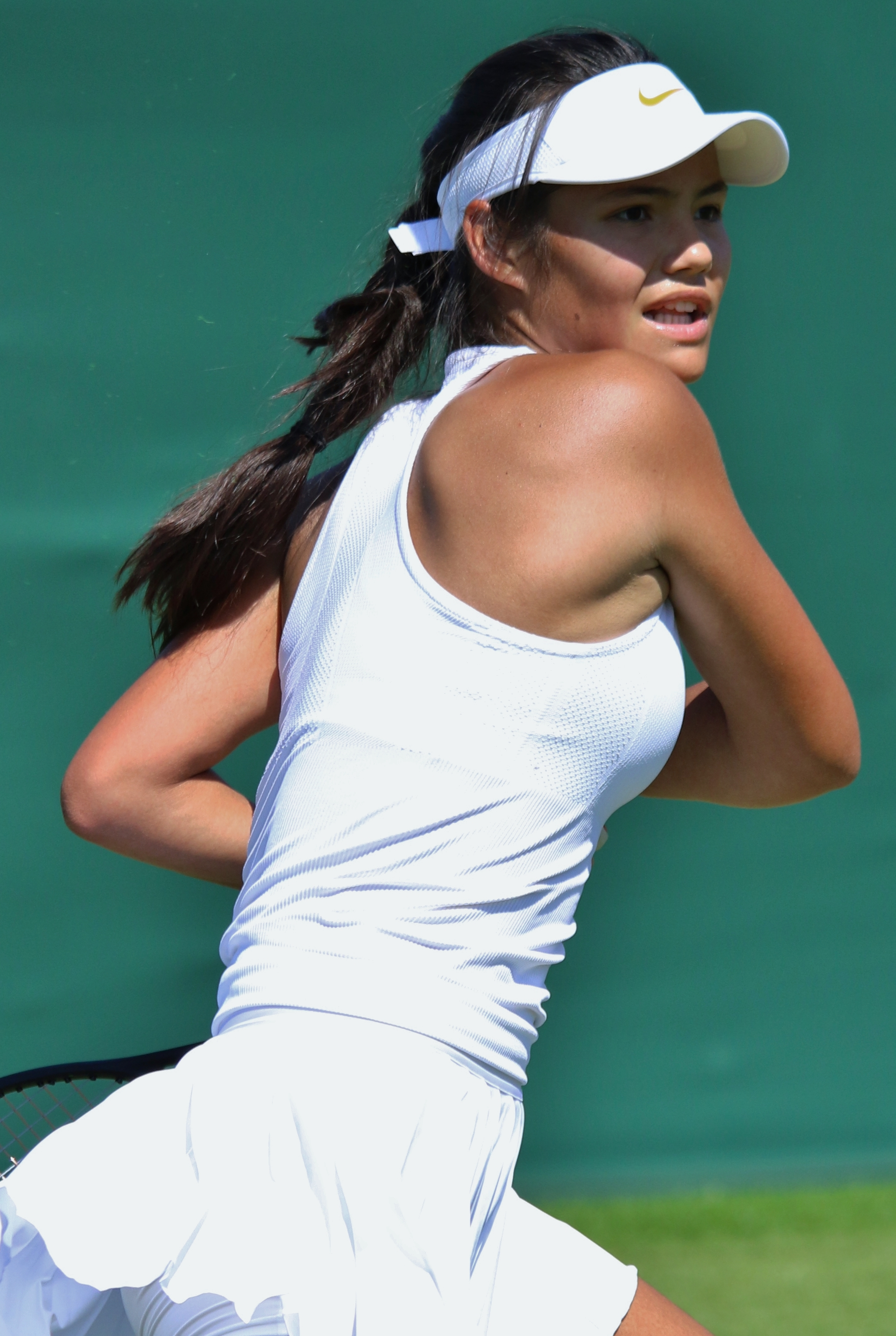
Naomi Osaka won her fourth major title and second Australian Open title, defeating Jennifer Brady in the final. Barbora Krejčíková won her first major singles title at the French Open, defeating Anastasia Pavlyuchenkova in the final. Ashleigh Barty won her second major singles title at Wimbledon, defeating Karolína Plíšková in the final. Emma Raducanu won her first major title at the US Open, defeating Leylah Fernandez in the final and becoming the first qualifier, man or woman, to win a major title.

The 2021 WTA Tour was the elite professional tennis circuit organised by the Women's Tennis Association (WTA) for the 2021 tennis season. The 2021 WTA Tour calendar comprises the Grand Slam tournaments (supervised by the International Tennis Federation (ITF)), the WTA 1000 tournaments, the WTA 500 tournaments, the WTA 250 tournaments, the Billie Jean King Cup (organized by the ITF), and the year-end championships (the WTA Finals and the WTA Elite Trophy). Also included in the 2021 calendar are the Summer Olympic Games, which were rescheduled from 2020.

== Schedule ==
This is the complete schedule of events on the 2021 calendar.

Key

Grand Slam tournaments
Summer Olympics
Year-end championships
WTA 1000 (Mandatory) (Note: These tournaments are still distributed by points: 1000 points (WTA 1000; mandatory); 900 points (WTA 1000; non-mandatory); 470 points (WTA 500); 280 points (WTA 250))
WTA 1000 (non-Mandatory)
WTA 500
WTA 250
Team events

=== January ===
| Week | Tournament | Champions | Runners-up | Semifinalists | Quarterfinalists |
|---|---|---|---|---|---|
| 4 Jan | Abu Dhabi Open; Abu Dhabi, United Arab Emirates; WTA 500; Hard – $565,530 – 64S/32Q/28D; Singles – Doubles | (Belarus) Aryna Sabalenka; 6–2, 6–2 | (Russia) Veronika Kudermetova | (Greece) Maria Sakkari (Ukraine) Marta Kostyuk | (United States) Sofia Kenin (Kazakhstan) Elena Rybakina (Spain) Sara Sorribes Tormo (Ukraine) Elina Svitolina |
| 4 Jan | Abu Dhabi Open; Abu Dhabi, United Arab Emirates; WTA 500; Hard – $565,530 – 64S/32Q/28D; Singles – Doubles | (Japan) Shuko Aoyama (Japan) Ena Shibahara; 7–6^{(7–5)}, 6–4 | (United States) Hayley Carter (Brazil) Luisa Stefani | (Greece) Maria Sakkari (Ukraine) Marta Kostyuk | (United States) Sofia Kenin (Kazakhstan) Elena Rybakina (Spain) Sara Sorribes Tormo (Ukraine) Elina Svitolina |

=== February ===
| Week | Tournament | Champions | Runners-up | Semifinalists | Quarterfinalists |
|---|---|---|---|---|---|
| 1 Feb | Yarra Valley Classic; Melbourne, Australia; WTA 500; Hard – $447,620 – 54S/28D; Singles – Doubles | (Australia) Ashleigh Barty; 7–6^{(7–3)}, 6–4 | (Spain) Garbiñe Muguruza | (United States) Serena Williams (Czech Republic) Markéta Vondroušová | (United States) Shelby Rogers (United States) Danielle Collins (Argentina) Nadia Podoroska (United States) Sofia Kenin |
| 1 Feb | Yarra Valley Classic; Melbourne, Australia; WTA 500; Hard – $447,620 – 54S/28D; Singles – Doubles | (Japan) Shuko Aoyama (Japan) Ena Shibahara; 6–3, 6–4 | (Russia) Anna Kalinskaya (Slovakia) Viktória Kužmová | (United States) Serena Williams (Czech Republic) Markéta Vondroušová | (United States) Shelby Rogers (United States) Danielle Collins (Argentina) Nadia Podoroska (United States) Sofia Kenin |
| 1 Feb | Gippsland Trophy; Melbourne, Australia; WTA 500; Hard – $447,620 – 54S/28D; Singles – Doubles | (Belgium) Elise Mertens; 6–4, 6–1 | (Estonia) Kaia Kanepi | (Russia) Ekaterina Alexandrova (Japan) Naomi Osaka | (Romania) Simona Halep (Czech Republic) Karolína Muchová (Ukraine) Elina Svitolina (Romania) Irina-Camelia Begu |
| 1 Feb | Gippsland Trophy; Melbourne, Australia; WTA 500; Hard – $447,620 – 54S/28D; Singles – Doubles | (Czech Republic) Barbora Krejčíková (Czech Republic) Kateřina Siniaková; 6–3, 7–6^{(7–4)} | (Chinese Taipei) Chan Hao-ching (Chinese Taipei) Latisha Chan | (Russia) Ekaterina Alexandrova (Japan) Naomi Osaka | (Romania) Simona Halep (Czech Republic) Karolína Muchová (Ukraine) Elina Svitolina (Romania) Irina-Camelia Begu |
| 1 Feb | Grampians Trophy; Melbourne, Australia; WTA 500; Hard – $235,820 – 28S; Singles | | (Estonia) Anett Kontaveit vs (United States) Ann Li final was cancelled due to a delay in schedule. Both players received runners-up prize money and points | (Greece) Maria Sakkari (United States) Jennifer Brady | (Germany) Angelique Kerber (Belarus) Victoria Azarenka (Czech Republic) Barbora Krejčíková (Romania) Sorana Cîrstea |
| 8 Feb; 15 Feb | Australian Open (Note: Qualifying matches were held at Dubai, United Arab Emirates from 10–13 January due to Australia's quarantine restrictions.); Melbourne, Australia; Grand Slam; Hard – A$33,098,500; 128S/128Q/64D/32X; Singles – Doubles – Mixed | (Japan) Naomi Osaka; 6–4, 6–3 | (United States) Jennifer Brady | (Czech Republic) Karolína Muchová (United States) Serena Williams | (Australia) Ashleigh Barty (United States) Jessica Pegula (Chinese Taipei) Hsieh Su-wei (Romania) Simona Halep |
| 8 Feb; 15 Feb | Australian Open; Melbourne, Australia; Grand Slam; Hard – A$33,098,500; 128S/128Q/64D/32X; Singles – Doubles – Mixed | (Belgium) Elise Mertens (Belarus) Aryna Sabalenka; 6–2, 6–3 | (Czech Republic) Barbora Krejčíková (Czech Republic) Kateřina Siniaková | (Czech Republic) Karolína Muchová (United States) Serena Williams | (Australia) Ashleigh Barty (United States) Jessica Pegula (Chinese Taipei) Hsieh Su-wei (Romania) Simona Halep |
| 8 Feb; 15 Feb | Australian Open; Melbourne, Australia; Grand Slam; Hard – A$33,098,500; 128S/128Q/64D/32X; Singles – Doubles – Mixed | (Czech Republic) Barbora Krejčíková (United States) Rajeev Ram; 6–1, 6–4 | (Australia) Samantha Stosur (Australia) Matthew Ebden | (Czech Republic) Karolína Muchová (United States) Serena Williams | (Australia) Ashleigh Barty (United States) Jessica Pegula (Chinese Taipei) Hsieh Su-wei (Romania) Simona Halep |
| 15 Feb | Phillip Island Trophy; Melbourne, Australia; WTA 250; Hard – $235,238 – 56S/16Q/28D; Singles – Doubles | (Russia) Daria Kasatkina; 4–6, 6–2, 6–2 | (Czech Republic) Marie Bouzková | (United States) Danielle Collins (Canada) Bianca Andreescu | (Sweden) Rebecca Peterson (Croatia) Petra Martić (Switzerland) Jil Teichmann (Romania) Irina-Camelia Begu |
| 15 Feb | Phillip Island Trophy; Melbourne, Australia; WTA 250; Hard – $235,238 – 56S/16Q/28D; Singles – Doubles | (India) Ankita Raina (Russia) Kamilla Rakhimova; 2–6, 6–4, [10–7] | (Russia) Anna Blinkova (Russia) Anastasia Potapova | (United States) Danielle Collins (Canada) Bianca Andreescu | (Sweden) Rebecca Peterson (Croatia) Petra Martić (Switzerland) Jil Teichmann (Romania) Irina-Camelia Begu |
| 22 Feb | Adelaide International; Adelaide, Australia; WTA 500; Hard – $535,530 – 28S/24Q/16D; Singles – Doubles | (Poland) Iga Świątek; 6–2, 6–2 | (Switzerland) Belinda Bencic | (Switzerland) Jil Teichmann (United States) Coco Gauff | (United States) Danielle Collins (Latvia) Anastasija Sevastova (United States) Shelby Rogers (Australia) Storm Sanders |
| 22 Feb | Adelaide International; Adelaide, Australia; WTA 500; Hard – $535,530 – 28S/24Q/16D; Singles – Doubles | (Chile) Alexa Guarachi (United States) Desirae Krawczyk; 6–7^{(4–7)}, 6–4, [10–3] | (United States) Hayley Carter (Brazil) Luisa Stefani | (Switzerland) Jil Teichmann (United States) Coco Gauff | (United States) Danielle Collins (Latvia) Anastasija Sevastova (United States) Shelby Rogers (Australia) Storm Sanders |

=== March ===
| Week | Tournament | Champions | Runners-up | Semifinalists | Quarterfinalists |
|---|---|---|---|---|---|
| 1 Mar | Qatar Open; Doha, Qatar; WTA 500; Hard – $565,530 – 28S/32Q/16D; Singles – Doubles | (Czech Republic) Petra Kvitová; 6–2, 6–1 | (Spain) Garbiñe Muguruza | (Belarus) Victoria Azarenka (United States) Jessica Pegula | (Ukraine) Elina Svitolina (Greece) Maria Sakkari (Estonia) Anett Kontaveit (Czech Republic) Karolína Plíšková |
| 1 Mar | Qatar Open; Doha, Qatar; WTA 500; Hard – $565,530 – 28S/32Q/16D; Singles – Doubles | (United States) Nicole Melichar (Netherlands) Demi Schuurs; 6–2, 2–6, [10–8] | (Romania) Monica Niculescu (Latvia) Jeļena Ostapenko | (Belarus) Victoria Azarenka (United States) Jessica Pegula | (Ukraine) Elina Svitolina (Greece) Maria Sakkari (Estonia) Anett Kontaveit (Czech Republic) Karolína Plíšková |
| 1 Mar | Lyon Open; Lyon, France; WTA 250; Hard (i) – $235,238 – 32S/24Q/16D; Singles – Doubles | (Denmark) Clara Tauson; 6–4, 6–1 | (Switzerland) Viktorija Golubic | (Spain) Paula Badosa (France) Fiona Ferro | (Italy) Camila Giorgi (France) Kristina Mladenovic (Belgium) Greet Minnen (France) Clara Burel |
| 1 Mar | Lyon Open; Lyon, France; WTA 250; Hard (i) – $235,238 – 32S/24Q/16D; Singles – Doubles | (Slovakia) Viktória Kužmová (Netherlands) Arantxa Rus; 3–6, 7–5, [10–7] | (Canada) Eugenie Bouchard (Serbia) Olga Danilović | (Spain) Paula Badosa (France) Fiona Ferro | (Italy) Camila Giorgi (France) Kristina Mladenovic (Belgium) Greet Minnen (France) Clara Burel |
| 8 Mar | Dubai Tennis Championships; Dubai, United Arab Emirates; WTA 1000 (non-Mandatory); Hard – $1,835,490 – 56S/32Q/28D; Singles – Doubles | (Spain) Garbiñe Muguruza; 7–6^{(8–6)}, 6–3 | (Czech Republic) Barbora Krejčíková | (Switzerland) Jil Teichmann (Belgium) Elise Mertens | (Russia) Anastasia Potapova (United States) Coco Gauff (Belarus) Aryna Sabalenka (United States) Jessica Pegula |
| 8 Mar | Dubai Tennis Championships; Dubai, United Arab Emirates; WTA 1000 (non-Mandatory); Hard – $1,835,490 – 56S/32Q/28D; Singles – Doubles | (Chile) Alexa Guarachi (Croatia) Darija Jurak; 6–0, 6–3 | (China) Xu Yifan (China) Yang Zhaoxuan | (Switzerland) Jil Teichmann (Belgium) Elise Mertens | (Russia) Anastasia Potapova (United States) Coco Gauff (Belarus) Aryna Sabalenka (United States) Jessica Pegula |
| 8 Mar | Abierto Zapopan; Guadalajara, Mexico; WTA 250; Hard – $235,238 – 32S/24Q/16D; Singles – Doubles | (Spain) Sara Sorribes Tormo; 6–2, 7–5 | (Canada) Eugenie Bouchard | (Italy) Elisabetta Cocciaretto (Czech Republic) Marie Bouzková | (United States) Lauren Davis (United States) Caty McNally (Australia) Astra Sharma (Slovakia) Anna Karolína Schmiedlová |
| 8 Mar | Abierto Zapopan; Guadalajara, Mexico; WTA 250; Hard – $235,238 – 32S/24Q/16D; Singles – Doubles | (Australia) Ellen Perez (Australia) Astra Sharma; 6–4, 6–4 | (United States) Desirae Krawczyk (Mexico) Giuliana Olmos | (Italy) Elisabetta Cocciaretto (Czech Republic) Marie Bouzková | (United States) Lauren Davis (United States) Caty McNally (Australia) Astra Sharma (Slovakia) Anna Karolína Schmiedlová |
| 15 Mar | St. Petersburg Trophy; St. Petersburg, Russia; WTA 500; Hard (i) – $565,530 – 28S/24Q/16D; Singles – Doubles | (Russia) Daria Kasatkina; 6–3, 2–1, ret. | (Russia) Margarita Gasparyan | (Russia) Vera Zvonareva (Russia) Svetlana Kuznetsova | (Russia) Ekaterina Alexandrova (Russia) Anastasia Gasanova (Romania) Jaqueline Cristian (Russia) Veronika Kudermetova |
| 15 Mar | St. Petersburg Trophy; St. Petersburg, Russia; WTA 500; Hard (i) – $565,530 – 28S/24Q/16D; Singles – Doubles | (Ukraine) Nadiia Kichenok (Romania) Raluca Olaru; 2–6, 6–3, [10–8] | (United States) Kaitlyn Christian (United States) Sabrina Santamaria | (Russia) Vera Zvonareva (Russia) Svetlana Kuznetsova | (Russia) Ekaterina Alexandrova (Russia) Anastasia Gasanova (Romania) Jaqueline Cristian (Russia) Veronika Kudermetova |
| 15 Mar | Monterrey Open; Monterrey, Mexico; WTA 250; Hard – $235,238 – 32S/24Q/16D; Singles – Doubles | (Canada) Leylah Fernandez; 6–1, 6–4 | (Switzerland) Viktorija Golubic | (Spain) Sara Sorribes Tormo (United States) Ann Li | (Slovakia) Viktória Kužmová (Slovakia) Anna Karolína Schmiedlová (China) Zheng Saisai (Russia) Anna Kalinskaya |
| 15 Mar | Monterrey Open; Monterrey, Mexico; WTA 250; Hard – $235,238 – 32S/24Q/16D; Singles – Doubles | (United States) Caroline Dolehide (United States) Asia Muhammad; 6–2, 6–3 | (United Kingdom) Heather Watson (China) Zheng Saisai | (Spain) Sara Sorribes Tormo (United States) Ann Li | (Slovakia) Viktória Kužmová (Slovakia) Anna Karolína Schmiedlová (China) Zheng Saisai (Russia) Anna Kalinskaya |
| 22 Mar; 29 Mar | Miami Open; Miami Gardens, United States; WTA 1000 (Mandatory); Hard – $3,260,190 – 96S/48Q/32D; Singles – Doubles | (Australia) Ashleigh Barty; 6–3, 4–0, ret. | (Canada) Bianca Andreescu | (Ukraine) Elina Svitolina (Greece) Maria Sakkari | (Belarus) Aryna Sabalenka (Latvia) Anastasija Sevastova (Spain) Sara Sorribes Tormo (Japan) Naomi Osaka |
| 22 Mar; 29 Mar | Miami Open; Miami Gardens, United States; WTA 1000 (Mandatory); Hard – $3,260,190 – 96S/48Q/32D; Singles – Doubles | (Japan) Shuko Aoyama (Japan) Ena Shibahara; 6–2, 7–5 | (United States) Hayley Carter (Brazil) Luisa Stefani | (Ukraine) Elina Svitolina (Greece) Maria Sakkari | (Belarus) Aryna Sabalenka (Latvia) Anastasija Sevastova (Spain) Sara Sorribes Tormo (Japan) Naomi Osaka |

=== April ===
| Week | Tournament | Champions | Runners-up | Semifinalists | Quarterfinalists |
|---|---|---|---|---|---|
| 5 Apr | Charleston Open; Charleston, United States; WTA 500; Clay – $565,530 – 56S/32Q/16D; Singles – Doubles | (Russia) Veronika Kudermetova; 6–4, 6–2 | (Montenegro) Danka Kovinić | (Spain) Paula Badosa (Tunisia) Ons Jabeur | (Australia) Ashleigh Barty (United States) Sloane Stephens (Kazakhstan) Yulia Putintseva (United States) Coco Gauff |
| 5 Apr | Charleston Open; Charleston, United States; WTA 500; Clay – $565,530 – 56S/32Q/16D; Singles – Doubles | (United States) Nicole Melichar (Netherlands) Demi Schuurs; 6–2, 6–4 | (Czech Republic) Marie Bouzková (Czech Republic) Lucie Hradecká | (Spain) Paula Badosa (Tunisia) Ons Jabeur | (Australia) Ashleigh Barty (United States) Sloane Stephens (Kazakhstan) Yulia Putintseva (United States) Coco Gauff |
| 5 Apr | Copa Colsanitas; Bogotá, Colombia; WTA 250; Clay (red) – $235,238 – 32S/24Q/16D; Singles – Doubles | (Colombia) Camila Osorio; 5–7, 6–3, 6–4 | (Slovenia) Tamara Zidanšek | (France) Harmony Tan (Bulgaria) Viktoriya Tomova | (Switzerland) Stefanie Vögele (Spain) Lara Arruabarrena (Spain) Nuria Párrizas Díaz (Italy) Sara Errani |
| 5 Apr | Copa Colsanitas; Bogotá, Colombia; WTA 250; Clay (red) – $235,238 – 32S/24Q/16D; Singles – Doubles | (France) Elixane Lechemia (United States) Ingrid Neel; 6–3, 6–4 | (Romania) Mihaela Buzărnescu (Germany) Anna-Lena Friedsam | (France) Harmony Tan (Bulgaria) Viktoriya Tomova | (Switzerland) Stefanie Vögele (Spain) Lara Arruabarrena (Spain) Nuria Párrizas Díaz (Italy) Sara Errani |
| 12 Apr | MUSC Health Open; Charleston, United States; WTA 250; Clay – $235,238 – 32S/16Q/16D; Singles – Doubles | (Australia) Astra Sharma; 2–6, 7–5, 6–1 | (Tunisia) Ons Jabeur | (Montenegro) Danka Kovinić (Colombia) Camila Osorio | (Japan) Nao Hibino (United States) Shelby Rogers (Czech Republic) Linda Fruhvirtová (Denmark) Clara Tauson |
| 12 Apr | MUSC Health Open; Charleston, United States; WTA 250; Clay – $235,238 – 32S/16Q/16D; Singles – Doubles | (United States) Hailey Baptiste (United States) Caty McNally; 6–7^{(4–7)}, 6–4, [10–6] | (Australia) Ellen Perez (Australia) Storm Sanders | (Montenegro) Danka Kovinić (Colombia) Camila Osorio | (Japan) Nao Hibino (United States) Shelby Rogers (Czech Republic) Linda Fruhvirtová (Denmark) Clara Tauson |
| 19 Apr | Stuttgart Open; Stuttgart, Germany; WTA 500; Clay (red) (i) – $565,530 – 28S/24Q/16D; Singles – Doubles | (Australia) Ashleigh Barty; 3–6, 6–0, 6–3 | (Belarus) Aryna Sabalenka | (Ukraine) Elina Svitolina (Romania) Simona Halep | (Czech Republic) Karolína Plíšková (Czech Republic) Petra Kvitová (Estonia) Anett Kontaveit (Russia) Ekaterina Alexandrova |
| 19 Apr | Stuttgart Open; Stuttgart, Germany; WTA 500; Clay (red) (i) – $565,530 – 28S/24Q/16D; Singles – Doubles | (Australia) Ashleigh Barty (United States) Jennifer Brady; 6–4, 5–7, [10–5] | (United States) Desirae Krawczyk (United States) Bethanie Mattek-Sands | (Ukraine) Elina Svitolina (Romania) Simona Halep | (Czech Republic) Karolína Plíšková (Czech Republic) Petra Kvitová (Estonia) Anett Kontaveit (Russia) Ekaterina Alexandrova |
| 19 Apr | İstanbul Cup; Istanbul, Turkey; WTA 250; Clay (red) – $235,238 – 32S/24Q/16D; Singles – Doubles | (Romania) Sorana Cîrstea; 6–1, 7–6^{(7–3)} | (Belgium) Elise Mertens | (Russia) Veronika Kudermetova (Ukraine) Marta Kostyuk | (Czech Republic) Kateřina Siniaková (Romania) Ana Bogdan (Croatia) Ana Konjuh (France) Fiona Ferro |
| 19 Apr | İstanbul Cup; Istanbul, Turkey; WTA 250; Clay (red) – $235,238 – 32S/24Q/16D; Singles – Doubles | (Russia) Veronika Kudermetova (Belgium) Elise Mertens; 6–1, 6–1 | (Japan) Nao Hibino (Japan) Makoto Ninomiya | (Russia) Veronika Kudermetova (Ukraine) Marta Kostyuk | (Czech Republic) Kateřina Siniaková (Romania) Ana Bogdan (Croatia) Ana Konjuh (France) Fiona Ferro |
| 26 Apr; 3 May | Madrid Open; Madrid, Spain; WTA 1000 (Mandatory); Clay (red) – €2,549,105 – 64S/48Q/30D; Singles – Doubles | (Belarus) Aryna Sabalenka; 6–0, 3–6, 6–4 | (Australia) Ashleigh Barty | (Spain) Paula Badosa (Russia) Anastasia Pavlyuchenkova | (Czech Republic) Petra Kvitová (Switzerland) Belinda Bencic (Belgium) Elise Mertens (Czech Republic) Karolína Muchová |
| 26 Apr; 3 May | Madrid Open; Madrid, Spain; WTA 1000 (Mandatory); Clay (red) – €2,549,105 – 64S/48Q/30D; Singles – Doubles | (Czech Republic) Barbora Krejčíková (Czech Republic) Kateřina Siniaková; 6–4, 6–3 | (Canada) Gabriela Dabrowski (Netherlands) Demi Schuurs | (Spain) Paula Badosa (Russia) Anastasia Pavlyuchenkova | (Czech Republic) Petra Kvitová (Switzerland) Belinda Bencic (Belgium) Elise Mertens (Czech Republic) Karolína Muchová |

=== May ===
| Week | Tournament | Champions | Runners-up | Semifinalists | Quarterfinalists |
|---|---|---|---|---|---|
| 10 May | Italian Open; Rome, Italy; WTA 1000 (Non-mandatory); Clay (red) – €1,577,613 – 56S/32Q/28D; Singles – Doubles | (Poland) Iga Świątek; 6–0, 6–0 | (Czech Republic) Karolína Plíšková | (United States) Coco Gauff (Croatia) Petra Martić | (Australia) Ashleigh Barty (Ukraine) Elina Svitolina (Latvia) Jeļena Ostapenko (United States) Jessica Pegula |
| 10 May | Italian Open; Rome, Italy; WTA 1000 (Non-mandatory); Clay (red) – €1,577,613 – 56S/32Q/28D; Singles – Doubles | (Canada) Sharon Fichman (Mexico) Giuliana Olmos; 4–6, 7–5, [10–5] | (France) Kristina Mladenovic (Czech Republic) Markéta Vondroušová | (United States) Coco Gauff (Croatia) Petra Martić | (Australia) Ashleigh Barty (Ukraine) Elina Svitolina (Latvia) Jeļena Ostapenko (United States) Jessica Pegula |
| 17 May | Serbia Ladies Open; Belgrade, Serbia; WTA 250; Clay (red) – $235,238 – 32S/24Q/16D; Singles – Doubles | (Spain) Paula Badosa; 6–2, 2–0, ret. | (Croatia) Ana Konjuh | (Bulgaria) Viktoriya Tomova (Colombia) Camila Osorio | (Hungary) Réka Luca Jani (Sweden) Rebecca Peterson (Belarus) Aliaksandra Sasnovich (Argentina) Nadia Podoroska |
| 17 May | Serbia Ladies Open; Belgrade, Serbia; WTA 250; Clay (red) – $235,238 – 32S/24Q/16D; Singles – Doubles | (Serbia) Aleksandra Krunić (Serbia) Nina Stojanović; 6–0, 6–2 | (Belgium) Greet Minnen (Belgium) Alison Van Uytvanck | (Bulgaria) Viktoriya Tomova (Colombia) Camila Osorio | (Hungary) Réka Luca Jani (Sweden) Rebecca Peterson (Belarus) Aliaksandra Sasnovich (Argentina) Nadia Podoroska |
| 17 May | Emilia-Romagna Open; Parma, Italy; WTA 250; Clay (red) – $235,238 – 32S/24Q/16D; Singles – Doubles | (United States) Coco Gauff; 6–1, 6–3 | (China) Wang Qiang | (Czech Republic) Kateřina Siniaková (United States) Sloane Stephens | (France) Caroline Garcia (United States) Amanda Anisimova (Italy) Sara Errani (Croatia) Petra Martić |
| 17 May | Emilia-Romagna Open; Parma, Italy; WTA 250; Clay (red) – $235,238 – 32S/24Q/16D; Singles – Doubles | (United States) Coco Gauff (United States) Caty McNally; 6–3, 6–2 | (Croatia) Darija Jurak (Slovenia) Andreja Klepač | (Czech Republic) Kateřina Siniaková (United States) Sloane Stephens | (France) Caroline Garcia (United States) Amanda Anisimova (Italy) Sara Errani (Croatia) Petra Martić |
| 24 May | Internationaux de Strasbourg; Strasbourg, France; WTA 250; Clay (red) – $235,238 – 32S/22Q/16D; Singles – Doubles | (Czech Republic) Barbora Krejčíková; 6–3, 6–3 | (Romania) Sorana Cîrstea | (Poland) Magda Linette (Germany) Jule Niemeier | (Canada) Bianca Andreescu (Kazakhstan) Yulia Putintseva (Russia) Ekaterina Alexandrova (Netherlands) Arantxa Rus |
| 24 May | Internationaux de Strasbourg; Strasbourg, France; WTA 250; Clay (red) – $235,238 – 32S/22Q/16D; Singles – Doubles | (Chile) Alexa Guarachi (United States) Desirae Krawczyk; 6–2, 6–3 | (Japan) Makoto Ninomiya (China) Yang Zhaoxuan | (Poland) Magda Linette (Germany) Jule Niemeier | (Canada) Bianca Andreescu (Kazakhstan) Yulia Putintseva (Russia) Ekaterina Alexandrova (Netherlands) Arantxa Rus |
| 31 May; 7 Jun | French Open; Paris, France; Grand Slam; Clay (red); 128S/128Q/64D/16X; Singles – Doubles – Mixed | (Czech Republic) Barbora Krejčíková; 6–1, 2–6, 6–4 | (Russia) Anastasia Pavlyuchenkova | (Greece) Maria Sakkari (Slovenia) Tamara Zidanšek | (United States) Coco Gauff (Poland) Iga Świątek (Kazakhstan) Elena Rybakina (Spain) Paula Badosa |
| 31 May; 7 Jun | French Open; Paris, France; Grand Slam; Clay (red); 128S/128Q/64D/16X; Singles – Doubles – Mixed | (Czech Republic) Barbora Krejčíková (Czech Republic) Kateřina Siniaková; 6–4, 6–2 | (United States) Bethanie Mattek-Sands (Poland) Iga Świątek | (Greece) Maria Sakkari (Slovenia) Tamara Zidanšek | (United States) Coco Gauff (Poland) Iga Świątek (Kazakhstan) Elena Rybakina (Spain) Paula Badosa |
| 31 May; 7 Jun | French Open; Paris, France; Grand Slam; Clay (red); 128S/128Q/64D/16X; Singles – Doubles – Mixed | (United States) Desirae Krawczyk (United Kingdom) Joe Salisbury; 2–6, 6–4, [10–5] | (Russia) Elena Vesnina (Russia) Aslan Karatsev | (Greece) Maria Sakkari (Slovenia) Tamara Zidanšek | (United States) Coco Gauff (Poland) Iga Świątek (Kazakhstan) Elena Rybakina (Spain) Paula Badosa |

=== June ===
| Week | Tournament | Champions | Runners-up | Semifinalists | Quarterfinalists |
|---|---|---|---|---|---|
| 7 Jun | Nottingham Open; Nottingham, United Kingdom; WTA 250; Grass – $235,238 – 48S/16Q/16D; Singles – Doubles | (United Kingdom) Johanna Konta; 6–2, 6–1 | (China) Zhang Shuai | (Serbia) Nina Stojanović (United States) Lauren Davis | (Belgium) Alison Van Uytvanck (Czech Republic) Tereza Martincová (France) Kristina Mladenovic (United Kingdom) Katie Boulter |
| 7 Jun | Nottingham Open; Nottingham, United Kingdom; WTA 250; Grass – $235,238 – 48S/16Q/16D; Singles – Doubles | (Ukraine) Lyudmyla Kichenok (Japan) Makoto Ninomiya; 6–4, 6–7^{(3–7)}, [10–8] | (United States) Caroline Dolehide (Australia) Storm Sanders | (Serbia) Nina Stojanović (United States) Lauren Davis | (Belgium) Alison Van Uytvanck (Czech Republic) Tereza Martincová (France) Kristina Mladenovic (United Kingdom) Katie Boulter |
| 14 Jun | German Open; Berlin, Germany; WTA 500; Grass – $565,530 – 28S/24Q/16D; Singles – Doubles | (Russia) Liudmila Samsonova; 1–6, 6–1, 6–3 | (Switzerland) Belinda Bencic | (Belarus) Victoria Azarenka (France) Alizé Cornet | (United States) Madison Keys (United States) Jessica Pegula (Spain) Garbiñe Muguruza (Russia) Ekaterina Alexandrova |
| 14 Jun | German Open; Berlin, Germany; WTA 500; Grass – $565,530 – 28S/24Q/16D; Singles – Doubles | (Belarus) Victoria Azarenka (Belarus) Aryna Sabalenka; 4–6, 7–5, [10–4] | (United States) Nicole Melichar (Netherlands) Demi Schuurs | (Belarus) Victoria Azarenka (France) Alizé Cornet | (United States) Madison Keys (United States) Jessica Pegula (Spain) Garbiñe Muguruza (Russia) Ekaterina Alexandrova |
| 14 Jun | Birmingham Classic; Birmingham, United Kingdom; WTA 250; Grass – $235,238 – 32S/24Q/16D; Singles – Doubles | (Tunisia) Ons Jabeur; 7–5, 6–4 | (Russia) Daria Kasatkina | (United States) CoCo Vandeweghe (United Kingdom) Heather Watson | (Czech Republic) Marie Bouzková (Czech Republic) Tereza Martincová (Croatia) Donna Vekić (Russia) Anastasia Potapova |
| 14 Jun | Birmingham Classic; Birmingham, United Kingdom; WTA 250; Grass – $235,238 – 32S/24Q/16D; Singles – Doubles | (Czech Republic) Marie Bouzková (Czech Republic) Lucie Hradecká; 6–4, 2–6, [10–8] | (Tunisia) Ons Jabeur (Australia) Ellen Perez | (United States) CoCo Vandeweghe (United Kingdom) Heather Watson | (Czech Republic) Marie Bouzková (Czech Republic) Tereza Martincová (Croatia) Donna Vekić (Russia) Anastasia Potapova |
| 21 Jun | Eastbourne International; Eastbourne, United Kingdom; WTA 500; Grass – $565,530 – 32S/24Q/16D; Singles – Doubles | (Latvia) Jeļena Ostapenko; 6–3, 6–3 | (Estonia) Anett Kontaveit | (Italy) Camila Giorgi (Kazakhstan) Elena Rybakina | (Belarus) Aryna Sabalenka (Switzerland) Viktorija Golubic (Russia) Daria Kasatkina (Latvia) Anastasija Sevastova |
| 21 Jun | Eastbourne International; Eastbourne, United Kingdom; WTA 500; Grass – $565,530 – 32S/24Q/16D; Singles – Doubles | (Japan) Shuko Aoyama (Japan) Ena Shibahara; 6–1, 6–4 | (United States) Nicole Melichar (Netherlands) Demi Schuurs | (Italy) Camila Giorgi (Kazakhstan) Elena Rybakina | (Belarus) Aryna Sabalenka (Switzerland) Viktorija Golubic (Russia) Daria Kasatkina (Latvia) Anastasija Sevastova |
| 21 Jun | Bad Homburg Open; Bad Homburg, Germany; WTA 250; Grass – $235,238 – 32S/8Q/16D; Singles – Doubles | (Germany) Angelique Kerber; 6–3, 6–2 | (Czech Republic) Kateřina Siniaková | (Czech Republic) Petra Kvitová (Spain) Sara Sorribes Tormo | (Argentina) Nadia Podoroska (United States) Amanda Anisimova (Germany) Laura Siegemund (Belarus) Victoria Azarenka |
| 21 Jun | Bad Homburg Open; Bad Homburg, Germany; WTA 250; Grass – $235,238 – 32S/8Q/16D; Singles – Doubles | (Croatia) Darija Jurak (Slovenia) Andreja Klepač; 6–3, 6–1 | (Ukraine) Nadiia Kichenok (Romania) Raluca Olaru | (Czech Republic) Petra Kvitová (Spain) Sara Sorribes Tormo | (Argentina) Nadia Podoroska (United States) Amanda Anisimova (Germany) Laura Siegemund (Belarus) Victoria Azarenka |
| 28 Jun; 5 Jul | Wimbledon; London, United Kingdom; Grand Slam; Grass – 128S/128Q/64D/48X; Singles – Doubles – Mixed | (Australia) Ashleigh Barty; 6–3, 6–7^{(4–7)}, 6–3 | (Czech Republic) Karolína Plíšková | (Germany) Angelique Kerber (Belarus) Aryna Sabalenka | (Australia) Ajla Tomljanović (Czech Republic) Karolína Muchová (Switzerland) Viktorija Golubic (Tunisia) Ons Jabeur |
| 28 Jun; 5 Jul | Wimbledon; London, United Kingdom; Grand Slam; Grass – 128S/128Q/64D/48X; Singles – Doubles – Mixed | (Chinese Taipei) Hsieh Su-wei (Belgium) Elise Mertens; 3–6, 7–5, 9–7 | (Russia) Veronika Kudermetova (Russia) Elena Vesnina | (Germany) Angelique Kerber (Belarus) Aryna Sabalenka | (Australia) Ajla Tomljanović (Czech Republic) Karolína Muchová (Switzerland) Viktorija Golubic (Tunisia) Ons Jabeur |
| 28 Jun; 5 Jul | Wimbledon; London, United Kingdom; Grand Slam; Grass – 128S/128Q/64D/48X; Singles – Doubles – Mixed | (United States) Desirae Krawczyk (United Kingdom) Neal Skupski; 6–2, 7–6^{(7–1)} | (United Kingdom) Harriet Dart (United Kingdom) Joe Salisbury | (Germany) Angelique Kerber (Belarus) Aryna Sabalenka | (Australia) Ajla Tomljanović (Czech Republic) Karolína Muchová (Switzerland) Viktorija Golubic (Tunisia) Ons Jabeur |

=== July ===
| Week | Tournament | Champions | Runners-up | Semifinalists | | Quarterfinalists |
|---|---|---|---|---|---|---|
| 5 Jul | Hamburg European Open; Hamburg, Germany; WTA 250; Clay (red) – $235,238 – 28S/16Q/15D; Singles – Doubles | (Romania) Elena-Gabriela Ruse; 7–6^{(8–6)}, 6–4 | (Germany) Andrea Petkovic | (Ukraine) Dayana Yastremska (Germany) Jule Niemeier | | (Italy) Sara Errani (United States) Danielle Collins (Slovenia) Tamara Zidanšek (Belgium) Ysaline Bonaventure |
| 5 Jul | Hamburg European Open; Hamburg, Germany; WTA 250; Clay (red) – $235,238 – 28S/16Q/15D; Singles – Doubles | (Italy) Jasmine Paolini (Switzerland) Jil Teichmann; 6–0, 6–4 | (Australia) Astra Sharma (Netherlands) Rosalie van der Hoek | (Ukraine) Dayana Yastremska (Germany) Jule Niemeier | | (Italy) Sara Errani (United States) Danielle Collins (Slovenia) Tamara Zidanšek (Belgium) Ysaline Bonaventure |
| 12 Jul | Hungarian Grand Prix; Budapest, Hungary; WTA 250; Clay (red) – $235,238 – 32S/24Q/16D; Singles – Doubles | (Kazakhstan) Yulia Putintseva; 6–4, 6–0 | (Ukraine) Anhelina Kalinina | (Hungary) Dalma Gálfi (United States) Danielle Collins | | (Ukraine) Kateryna Kozlova (Serbia) Olga Danilović (Hungary) Panna Udvardy (Argentina) Paula Ormaechea |
| 12 Jul | Hungarian Grand Prix; Budapest, Hungary; WTA 250; Clay (red) – $235,238 – 32S/24Q/16D; Singles – Doubles | (Romania) Mihaela Buzărnescu (Hungary) Fanny Stollár; 6–4, 6–4 | (Spain) Aliona Bolsova (Germany) Tamara Korpatsch | (Hungary) Dalma Gálfi (United States) Danielle Collins | | (Ukraine) Kateryna Kozlova (Serbia) Olga Danilović (Hungary) Panna Udvardy (Argentina) Paula Ormaechea |
| 12 Jul | Swiss Open; Lausanne, Switzerland; WTA 250; Clay (red) – $235,238 – 32S/8Q/16D; Singles – Doubles | (Slovenia) Tamara Zidanšek; 4–6, 7–6^{(7–5)}, 6–1 | (France) Clara Burel | (Belgium) Maryna Zanevska (France) Caroline Garcia | | (Italy) Lucia Bronzetti (Russia) Natalia Vikhlyantseva (Kazakhstan) Zarina Diyas (France) Fiona Ferro |
| 12 Jul | Swiss Open; Lausanne, Switzerland; WTA 250; Clay (red) – $235,238 – 32S/8Q/16D; Singles – Doubles | (Switzerland) Susan Bandecchi (Switzerland) Simona Waltert; 6–3, 6–7^{(3–7)}, [10–5] | (Norway) Ulrikke Eikeri (Greece) Valentini Grammatikopoulou | (Belgium) Maryna Zanevska (France) Caroline Garcia | | (Italy) Lucia Bronzetti (Russia) Natalia Vikhlyantseva (Kazakhstan) Zarina Diyas (France) Fiona Ferro |
| 12 Jul | Prague Open; Prague, Czech Republic; WTA 250; Hard – $235,238 – 32S/24Q/16D; Singles – Doubles | (Czech Republic) Barbora Krejčíková; 6–2, 6–0 | (Czech Republic) Tereza Martincová | (Belgium) Greet Minnen (China) Wang Xinyu | | (Slovakia) Viktória Kužmová (Australia) Storm Sanders (United States) Grace Min (Czech Republic) Kateřina Siniaková |
| 12 Jul | Prague Open; Prague, Czech Republic; WTA 250; Hard – $235,238 – 32S/24Q/16D; Singles – Doubles | (Czech Republic) Marie Bouzková (Czech Republic) Lucie Hradecká; 7–6^{(7–3)}, 6–4 | (Slovakia) Viktória Kužmová (Serbia) Nina Stojanović | (Belgium) Greet Minnen (China) Wang Xinyu | | (Slovakia) Viktória Kužmová (Australia) Storm Sanders (United States) Grace Min (Czech Republic) Kateřina Siniaková |
| 19 Jul | Palermo Open; Palermo, Italy; WTA 250; Clay (red) – $235,238 – 32S/16Q/16D; Singles – Doubles | (United States) Danielle Collins; 6–4, 6–2 | (Romania) Elena-Gabriela Ruse | (China) Zhang Shuai (France) Océane Dodin | | (Australia) Astra Sharma (Serbia) Olga Danilović (Italy) Lucia Bronzetti (Romania) Jaqueline Cristian |
| 19 Jul | Palermo Open; Palermo, Italy; WTA 250; Clay (red) – $235,238 – 32S/16Q/16D; Singles – Doubles | (New Zealand) Erin Routliffe (Belgium) Kimberley Zimmermann; 7–6^{(7–5)}, 4–6, [10–4] | (Russia) Natela Dzalamidze (Russia) Kamilla Rakhimova | (China) Zhang Shuai (France) Océane Dodin | | (Australia) Astra Sharma (Serbia) Olga Danilović (Italy) Lucia Bronzetti (Romania) Jaqueline Cristian |
| 19 Jul | Poland Open; Gdynia, Poland; WTA 250; Clay (red) – $235,238 – 32S/16Q/16D; Singles – Doubles | (Belgium) Maryna Zanevska; 6–4, 7–6^{(7–4)} | (Slovakia) Kristína Kučová | (Ukraine) Kateryna Kozlova (Germany) Tamara Korpatsch | | (Spain) Nuria Párrizas Díaz (Poland) Katarzyna Kawa (Georgia (country)) Ekaterine Gorgodze (Hungary) Anna Bondár |
| 19 Jul | Poland Open; Gdynia, Poland; WTA 250; Clay (red) – $235,238 – 32S/16Q/16D; Singles – Doubles | (Kazakhstan) Anna Danilina (Belarus) Lidziya Marozava; 6–3, 6–2 | (Ukraine) Kateryna Bondarenko (Poland) Katarzyna Piter | (Ukraine) Kateryna Kozlova (Germany) Tamara Korpatsch | | (Spain) Nuria Párrizas Díaz (Poland) Katarzyna Kawa (Georgia (country)) Ekaterine Gorgodze (Hungary) Anna Bondár |
| 26 Jul | Summer Olympic Games; Tokyo, Japan; Summer Olympic Games; Hard – 64S/32D/16X; Singles – Doubles – Mixed | Gold | Silver | Bronze | Fourth place | Quarterfinalists |
| 26 Jul | Summer Olympic Games; Tokyo, Japan; Summer Olympic Games; Hard – 64S/32D/16X; Singles – Doubles – Mixed | (Switzerland) Belinda Bencic; 7–5, 2–6, 6–3 | (Czech Republic) Markéta Vondroušová | (Ukraine) Elina Svitolina; 1–6, 7–6^{(7–5)}, 6–4 | (Kazakhstan) Elena Rybakina | (Russia) Anastasia Pavlyuchenkova (Spain) Garbiñe Muguruza (Italy) Camila Giorgi (Spain) Paula Badosa |
| 26 Jul | Summer Olympic Games; Tokyo, Japan; Summer Olympic Games; Hard – 64S/32D/16X; Singles – Doubles – Mixed | (Czech Republic) Barbora Krejčíková (Czech Republic) Kateřina Siniaková; 7–5, 6–1 | (Switzerland) Belinda Bencic (Switzerland) Viktorija Golubic | (Brazil) Laura Pigossi (Brazil) Luisa Stefani; 4–6, 6–4, [11–9] | (Russia) Veronika Kudermetova (Russia) Elena Vesnina | (Russia) Anastasia Pavlyuchenkova (Spain) Garbiñe Muguruza (Italy) Camila Giorgi (Spain) Paula Badosa |
| 26 Jul | Summer Olympic Games; Tokyo, Japan; Summer Olympic Games; Hard – 64S/32D/16X; Singles – Doubles – Mixed | (Russia) Anastasia Pavlyuchenkova (Russia) Andrey Rublev; 6–3, 6–7^{(5–7)}, [13–11] | (Russia) Elena Vesnina (Russia) Aslan Karatsev | (Australia) Ashleigh Barty (Australia) John Peers; Walkover | (Serbia) Nina Stojanović (Serbia) Novak Djokovic | (Russia) Anastasia Pavlyuchenkova (Spain) Garbiñe Muguruza (Italy) Camila Giorgi (Spain) Paula Badosa |

=== August ===
| Week | Tournament | Champions | Runners-up | Semifinalists | Quarterfinalists |
|---|---|---|---|---|---|
| 2 Aug | Silicon Valley Classic; San Jose, United States; WTA 500; Hard – $565,530 – 28S/16Q/16D; Singles – Doubles | (United States) Danielle Collins; 6–3, 6–7^{(10–12)}, 6–1 | (Russia) Daria Kasatkina | (Belgium) Elise Mertens (Croatia) Ana Konjuh | (Kazakhstan) Yulia Putintseva (Poland) Magda Linette (China) Zhang Shuai (Kazakhstan) Elena Rybakina |
| 2 Aug | Silicon Valley Classic; San Jose, United States; WTA 500; Hard – $565,530 – 28S/16Q/16D; Singles – Doubles | (Croatia) Darija Jurak (Slovenia) Andreja Klepač; 6–1, 7–5 | (Canada) Gabriela Dabrowski (Brazil) Luisa Stefani | (Belgium) Elise Mertens (Croatia) Ana Konjuh | (Kazakhstan) Yulia Putintseva (Poland) Magda Linette (China) Zhang Shuai (Kazakhstan) Elena Rybakina |
| 2 Aug | Winners Open; Cluj-Napoca, Romania; WTA 250; Clay (red) – $235,238 – 32S/24Q/16D; Singles – Doubles | (Germany) Andrea Petkovic; 6–1, 6–1 | (Egypt) Mayar Sherif | (Romania) Mihaela Buzărnescu (Serbia) Aleksandra Krunić | (Slovakia) Kristína Kučová (Czech Republic) Kristýna Plíšková (Slovakia) Anna Karolína Schmiedlová (Australia) Seone Mendez |
| 2 Aug | Winners Open; Cluj-Napoca, Romania; WTA 250; Clay (red) – $235,238 – 32S/24Q/16D; Singles – Doubles | (Russia) Natela Dzalamidze (Slovenia) Kaja Juvan; 6–3, 6–4 | (Poland) Katarzyna Piter (Egypt) Mayar Sherif | (Romania) Mihaela Buzărnescu (Serbia) Aleksandra Krunić | (Slovakia) Kristína Kučová (Czech Republic) Kristýna Plíšková (Slovakia) Anna Karolína Schmiedlová (Australia) Seone Mendez |
| 9 Aug | Canadian Open; Montreal, Canada; WTA 1000 (Non-mandatory); Hard – $1,835,490 – 56S/32Q/28D; Singles – Doubles | (Italy) Camila Giorgi; 6–3, 7–5 | (Czech Republic) Karolína Plíšková | (Belarus) Aryna Sabalenka (United States) Jessica Pegula | (Belarus) Victoria Azarenka (Spain) Sara Sorribes Tormo (United States) Coco Gauff (Tunisia) Ons Jabeur |
| 9 Aug | Canadian Open; Montreal, Canada; WTA 1000 (Non-mandatory); Hard – $1,835,490 – 56S/32Q/28D; Singles – Doubles | (Canada) Gabriela Dabrowski (Brazil) Luisa Stefani; 6–3, 6–4 | (Croatia) Darija Jurak (Slovenia) Andreja Klepač | (Belarus) Aryna Sabalenka (United States) Jessica Pegula | (Belarus) Victoria Azarenka (Spain) Sara Sorribes Tormo (United States) Coco Gauff (Tunisia) Ons Jabeur |
| 16 Aug | Cincinnati Open; Mason, United States; WTA 1000 (Non-mandatory); Hard – $2,114,989 – 56S/32Q/28D; Singles – Doubles | (Australia) Ashleigh Barty; 6–3, 6–1 | (Switzerland) Jil Teichmann | (Germany) Angelique Kerber (Czech Republic) Karolína Plíšková | (Czech Republic) Barbora Krejčíková (Czech Republic) Petra Kvitová (Spain) Paula Badosa (Switzerland) Belinda Bencic |
| 16 Aug | Cincinnati Open; Mason, United States; WTA 1000 (Non-mandatory); Hard – $2,114,989 – 56S/32Q/28D; Singles – Doubles | (Australia) Samantha Stosur (China) Zhang Shuai; 7–5, 6–3 | (Canada) Gabriela Dabrowski (Brazil) Luisa Stefani | (Germany) Angelique Kerber (Czech Republic) Karolína Plíšková | (Czech Republic) Barbora Krejčíková (Czech Republic) Petra Kvitová (Spain) Paula Badosa (Switzerland) Belinda Bencic |
| 23 Aug | Tennis in the Land; Cleveland, United States; WTA 250; Hard – $235,238 – 32S/16Q/16D; Singles – Doubles | (Estonia) Anett Kontaveit; 7–6^{(7–5)}, 6–4 | (Romania) Irina-Camelia Begu | (Poland) Magda Linette (Spain) Sara Sorribes Tormo | (Russia) Daria Kasatkina (Belarus) Aliaksandra Sasnovich (China) Zhang Shuai (Czech Republic) Kateřina Siniaková |
| 23 Aug | Tennis in the Land; Cleveland, United States; WTA 250; Hard – $235,238 – 32S/16Q/16D; Singles – Doubles | (Japan) Shuko Aoyama (Japan) Ena Shibahara; 7–5, 6–3 | (United States) Christina McHale (India) Sania Mirza | (Poland) Magda Linette (Spain) Sara Sorribes Tormo | (Russia) Daria Kasatkina (Belarus) Aliaksandra Sasnovich (China) Zhang Shuai (Czech Republic) Kateřina Siniaková |
| 23 Aug | Chicago Women's Open; Chicago, United States; WTA 250; Hard – $235,238 – 32S/16Q/16D; Singles – Doubles | (Ukraine) Elina Svitolina; 7–5, 6–4 | (France) Alizé Cornet | (Sweden) Rebecca Peterson (Russia) Varvara Gracheva | (France) Kristina Mladenovic (Czech Republic) Tereza Martincová (Ukraine) Marta Kostyuk (Czech Republic) Markéta Vondroušová |
| 23 Aug | Chicago Women's Open; Chicago, United States; WTA 250; Hard – $235,238 – 32S/16Q/16D; Singles – Doubles | (Ukraine) Nadiia Kichenok (Romania) Raluca Olaru; 7–6^{(8–6)}, 5–7, [10–8] | (Ukraine) Lyudmyla Kichenok (Japan) Makoto Ninomiya | (Sweden) Rebecca Peterson (Russia) Varvara Gracheva | (France) Kristina Mladenovic (Czech Republic) Tereza Martincová (Ukraine) Marta Kostyuk (Czech Republic) Markéta Vondroušová |
| 30 Aug; 6 Sep | US Open; New York City, United States; Grand Slam; Hard – 128S/128Q/64D/32X; Singles – Doubles – Mixed | (United Kingdom) Emma Raducanu; 6–4, 6–3 | (Canada) Leylah Fernandez | (Greece) Maria Sakkari (Belarus) Aryna Sabalenka | (Switzerland) Belinda Bencic (Czech Republic) Karolína Plíšková (Ukraine) Elina Svitolina (Czech Republic) Barbora Krejčíková |
| 30 Aug; 6 Sep | US Open; New York City, United States; Grand Slam; Hard – 128S/128Q/64D/32X; Singles – Doubles – Mixed | (Australia) Samantha Stosur (China) Zhang Shuai; 6–3, 3–6, 6–3 | (United States) Coco Gauff (United States) Caty McNally | (Greece) Maria Sakkari (Belarus) Aryna Sabalenka | (Switzerland) Belinda Bencic (Czech Republic) Karolína Plíšková (Ukraine) Elina Svitolina (Czech Republic) Barbora Krejčíková |
| 30 Aug; 6 Sep | US Open; New York City, United States; Grand Slam; Hard – 128S/128Q/64D/32X; Singles – Doubles – Mixed | (United States) Desirae Krawczyk (United Kingdom) Joe Salisbury; 7–5, 6–2 | (Mexico) Giuliana Olmos (El Salvador) Marcelo Arévalo | (Greece) Maria Sakkari (Belarus) Aryna Sabalenka | (Switzerland) Belinda Bencic (Czech Republic) Karolína Plíšková (Ukraine) Elina Svitolina (Czech Republic) Barbora Krejčíková |

=== September ===
| Week | Tournament | Champions | Runners-up | Semifinalists | Quarterfinalists |
|---|---|---|---|---|---|
| 13 Sep | Luxembourg Open; Kockelscheuer, Luxembourg; WTA 250; Hard (i) – $235,238 – 30S/24Q/16D; Singles – Doubles | (Denmark) Clara Tauson; 6–3, 4–6, 6–4 | (Latvia) Jeļena Ostapenko | (Russia) Liudmila Samsonova (Czech Republic) Markéta Vondroušová | (Switzerland) Belinda Bencic (France) Alizé Cornet (Czech Republic) Marie Bouzková (Belgium) Elise Mertens |
| 13 Sep | Luxembourg Open; Kockelscheuer, Luxembourg; WTA 250; Hard (i) – $235,238 – 30S/24Q/16D; Singles – Doubles | (Belgium) Greet Minnen (Belgium) Alison Van Uytvanck; 6–3, 6–3 | (New Zealand) Erin Routliffe (Belgium) Kimberley Zimmermann | (Russia) Liudmila Samsonova (Czech Republic) Markéta Vondroušová | (Switzerland) Belinda Bencic (France) Alizé Cornet (Czech Republic) Marie Bouzková (Belgium) Elise Mertens |
| 13 Sep | Slovenia Open; Portorož, Slovenia; WTA 250; Hard – $235,238 – 32S/24Q/16D; Singles – Doubles | (Italy) Jasmine Paolini; 7–6^{(7–4)}, 6–2 | (United States) Alison Riske | (Slovenia) Kaja Juvan (Kazakhstan) Yulia Putintseva | (Slovenia) Tamara Zidanšek (France) Kristina Mladenovic (Romania) Sorana Cîrstea (Italy) Lucia Bronzetti |
| 13 Sep | Slovenia Open; Portorož, Slovenia; WTA 250; Hard – $235,238 – 32S/24Q/16D; Singles – Doubles | (Russia) Anna Kalinskaya (Slovakia) Tereza Mihalíková; 4–6, 6–2, [12–10] | (Serbia) Aleksandra Krunić (Netherlands) Lesley Pattinama Kerkhove | (Slovenia) Kaja Juvan (Kazakhstan) Yulia Putintseva | (Slovenia) Tamara Zidanšek (France) Kristina Mladenovic (Romania) Sorana Cîrstea (Italy) Lucia Bronzetti |
| 20 Sep | Ostrava Open; Ostrava, Czech Republic; WTA 500; Hard (i) – $565,530 – 28S/24Q/16D; Singles – Doubles | (Estonia) Anett Kontaveit; 6–2, 7–5 | (Greece) Maria Sakkari | (Poland) Iga Świątek (Czech Republic) Petra Kvitová | (Kazakhstan) Elena Rybakina (Czech Republic) Tereza Martincová (Switzerland) Belinda Bencic (Switzerland) Jil Teichmann |
| 20 Sep | Ostrava Open; Ostrava, Czech Republic; WTA 500; Hard (i) – $565,530 – 28S/24Q/16D; Singles – Doubles | (India) Sania Mirza (China) Zhang Shuai; 6–3, 6–2 | (United States) Kaitlyn Christian (New Zealand) Erin Routliffe | (Poland) Iga Świątek (Czech Republic) Petra Kvitová | (Kazakhstan) Elena Rybakina (Czech Republic) Tereza Martincová (Switzerland) Belinda Bencic (Switzerland) Jil Teichmann |
| 27 Sep | Chicago Fall Tennis Classic; Chicago, United States; WTA 500; Hard – $565,530 – 56S/32Q/28D; Singles – Doubles | (Spain) Garbiñe Muguruza; 3–6, 6–3, 6–0 | (Tunisia) Ons Jabeur | (Kazakhstan) Elena Rybakina (Czech Republic) Markéta Vondroušová | (Ukraine) Elina Svitolina (Switzerland) Belinda Bencic (United States) Danielle Collins (Japan) Mai Hontama |
| 27 Sep | Chicago Fall Tennis Classic; Chicago, United States; WTA 500; Hard – $565,530 – 56S/32Q/28D; Singles – Doubles | (Czech Republic) Květa Peschke (Germany) Andrea Petkovic; 6–3, 6–1 | (United States) Caroline Dolehide (United States) CoCo Vandeweghe | (Kazakhstan) Elena Rybakina (Czech Republic) Markéta Vondroušová | (Ukraine) Elina Svitolina (Switzerland) Belinda Bencic (United States) Danielle Collins (Japan) Mai Hontama |
| 27 Sep | Astana Open; Nur-Sultan, Kazakhstan; WTA 250; Hard (i) – $235,238 – 32S/24Q/16D; Singles – Doubles | (Belgium) Alison Van Uytvanck; 1–6, 6–4, 6–3 | (Kazakhstan) Yulia Putintseva | (Sweden) Rebecca Peterson (Romania) Jaqueline Cristian | (Russia) Anastasia Gasanova (Russia) Anastasia Potapova (Serbia) Aleksandra Krunić (Russia) Varvara Gracheva |
| 27 Sep | Astana Open; Nur-Sultan, Kazakhstan; WTA 250; Hard (i) – $235,238 – 32S/24Q/16D; Singles – Doubles | (Germany) Anna-Lena Friedsam (Romania) Monica Niculescu; 6–2, 4–6, [10–5] | (Russia) Angelina Gabueva (Russia) Anastasia Zakharova | (Sweden) Rebecca Peterson (Romania) Jaqueline Cristian | (Russia) Anastasia Gasanova (Russia) Anastasia Potapova (Serbia) Aleksandra Krunić (Russia) Varvara Gracheva |

=== October ===
| Week | Tournament | Champions | Runners-up | Semifinalists | Quarterfinalists |
|---|---|---|---|---|---|
| 4 Oct; 11 Oct | Indian Wells Open; Indian Wells, United States; WTA 1000 (Mandatory); Hard – $8,761,725 – 96S/48Q/32D; Singles – Doubles | (Spain) Paula Badosa; 7–6^{(7–5)}, 2–6, 7–6^{(7–2)} | (Belarus) Victoria Azarenka | (Tunisia) Ons Jabeur (Latvia) Jeļena Ostapenko | (Estonia) Anett Kontaveit (Germany) Angelique Kerber (United States) Jessica Pegula (United States) Shelby Rogers |
| 4 Oct; 11 Oct | Indian Wells Open; Indian Wells, United States; WTA 1000 (Mandatory); Hard – $8,761,725 – 96S/48Q/32D; Singles – Doubles | (Chinese Taipei) Hsieh Su-wei (Belgium) Elise Mertens; 7–6^{(7–1)}, 6–3 | (Russia) Veronika Kudermetova (Kazakhstan) Elena Rybakina | (Tunisia) Ons Jabeur (Latvia) Jeļena Ostapenko | (Estonia) Anett Kontaveit (Germany) Angelique Kerber (United States) Jessica Pegula (United States) Shelby Rogers |
| 18 Oct | Kremlin Cup; Moscow, Russia; WTA 500; Hard (i) – $565,530 – 28S/24Q/16D; Singles – Doubles | (Estonia) Anett Kontaveit; 4–6, 6–4, 7–5 | (Russia) Ekaterina Alexandrova | (Greece) Maria Sakkari (Czech Republic) Markéta Vondroušová | (Belarus) Aryna Sabalenka (Romania) Simona Halep (Russia) Anastasia Pavlyuchenkova (Spain) Garbiñe Muguruza |
| 18 Oct | Kremlin Cup; Moscow, Russia; WTA 500; Hard (i) – $565,530 – 28S/24Q/16D; Singles – Doubles | (Latvia) Jeļena Ostapenko (Czech Republic) Kateřina Siniaková; 6–2, 4–6, [10–8] | (Ukraine) Nadiia Kichenok (Romania) Raluca Olaru | (Greece) Maria Sakkari (Czech Republic) Markéta Vondroušová | (Belarus) Aryna Sabalenka (Romania) Simona Halep (Russia) Anastasia Pavlyuchenkova (Spain) Garbiñe Muguruza |
| 18 Oct | Tenerife Ladies Open; Guía de Isora, Spain; WTA 250; Hard – $235,238 – 32S/24Q/16D; Singles – Doubles | (United States) Ann Li; 6–1, 6–4 | (Colombia) Camila Osorio | (Italy) Camila Giorgi (France) Alizé Cornet | (China) Zheng Saisai (Netherlands) Arantxa Rus (Romania) Irina-Camelia Begu (Slovakia) Anna Karolína Schmiedlová |
| 18 Oct | Tenerife Ladies Open; Guía de Isora, Spain; WTA 250; Hard – $235,238 – 32S/24Q/16D; Singles – Doubles | (Norway) Ulrikke Eikeri (Australia) Ellen Perez; 6–3, 6–3 | (Ukraine) Lyudmyla Kichenok (Ukraine) Marta Kostyuk | (Italy) Camila Giorgi (France) Alizé Cornet | (China) Zheng Saisai (Netherlands) Arantxa Rus (Romania) Irina-Camelia Begu (Slovakia) Anna Karolína Schmiedlová |
| 25 Oct | Courmayeur Ladies Open; Courmayeur, Italy; WTA 250; Hard (i) – $235,238 – 32S/23Q/16D; Singles – Doubles | (Croatia) Donna Vekić; 7–6^{(7–3)}, 6–2 | (Denmark) Clara Tauson | (Italy) Jasmine Paolini (Russia) Liudmila Samsonova | (Ukraine) Dayana Yastremska (China) Wang Xinyu (Russia) Anna Kalinskaya (United States) Ann Li |
| 25 Oct | Courmayeur Ladies Open; Courmayeur, Italy; WTA 250; Hard (i) – $235,238 – 32S/23Q/16D; Singles – Doubles | (China) Wang Xinyu (China) Zheng Saisai; 6–4, 3–6, [10–5] | (Japan) Eri Hozumi (China) Zhang Shuai | (Italy) Jasmine Paolini (Russia) Liudmila Samsonova | (Ukraine) Dayana Yastremska (China) Wang Xinyu (Russia) Anna Kalinskaya (United States) Ann Li |
| 25 Oct | Transylvania Open; Cluj-Napoca, Romania; WTA 250; Hard (i) – $235,238 – 32S/20Q/16D; Singles – Doubles | (Estonia) Anett Kontaveit; 6–2, 6–3 | (Romania) Simona Halep | (Ukraine) Marta Kostyuk (Sweden) Rebecca Peterson | (Romania) Jaqueline Cristian (United Kingdom) Emma Raducanu (Ukraine) Lesia Tsurenko (Ukraine) Anhelina Kalinina |
| 25 Oct | Transylvania Open; Cluj-Napoca, Romania; WTA 250; Hard (i) – $235,238 – 32S/20Q/16D; Singles – Doubles | (Romania) Irina Bara (Georgia (country)) Ekaterine Gorgodze; 4–6, 6–1, [11–9] | (Serbia) Aleksandra Krunić (Netherlands) Lesley Pattinama Kerkhove | (Ukraine) Marta Kostyuk (Sweden) Rebecca Peterson | (Romania) Jaqueline Cristian (United Kingdom) Emma Raducanu (Ukraine) Lesia Tsurenko (Ukraine) Anhelina Kalinina |

=== November ===
| Week | Tournament | Champions | Runners-up | Semifinalists | Quarterfinalists |
|---|---|---|---|---|---|
| 1 Nov | Billie Jean King Cup Finals; Prague, Czech Republic; Hard (i) – 12 teams | RTF; 2–0 | Switzerland | United States; Australia | Round robin Canada; France; Belgium; Belarus; Slovakia; Spain; Czech Republic; Germany |
| 8 Nov | WTA Finals; Guadalajara, Mexico; Year-end championships Hard – $5,000,000 – 8S (RR)/8D (RR); Singles – Doubles | (Spain) Garbiñe Muguruza; 6–3, 7–5 | (Estonia) Anett Kontaveit | (Spain) Paula Badosa (Greece) Maria Sakkari | Round robin (Czech Republic) Barbora Krejčíková (Czech Republic) Karolína Plíšková (Belarus) Aryna Sabalenka (Poland) Iga Świątek |
| 8 Nov | WTA Finals; Guadalajara, Mexico; Year-end championships Hard – $5,000,000 – 8S (RR)/8D (RR); Singles – Doubles | (Czech Republic) Barbora Krejčíková (Czech Republic) Kateřina Siniaková; 6–3, 6–4 | (Chinese Taipei) Hsieh Su-wei (Belgium) Elise Mertens | (Spain) Paula Badosa (Greece) Maria Sakkari | Round robin (Czech Republic) Barbora Krejčíková (Czech Republic) Karolína Plíšková (Belarus) Aryna Sabalenka (Poland) Iga Świątek |
| 8 Nov | Linz Open; Linz, Austria; WTA 250; Hard (i) – $235,238 – 28S/16Q/16D; Singles – Doubles | (United States) Alison Riske; 2–6, 6–2, 7–5 | (Romania) Jaqueline Cristian | (United States) Danielle Collins (Romania) Simona Halep | (China) Wang Xinyu (Belgium) Alison Van Uytvanck (Russia) Veronika Kudermetova (Italy) Jasmine Paolini |
| 8 Nov | Linz Open; Linz, Austria; WTA 250; Hard (i) – $235,238 – 28S/16Q/16D; Singles – Doubles | (Russia) Natela Dzalamidze (Russia) Kamilla Rakhimova; 6–4, 6–2 | (China) Wang Xinyu (China) Zheng Saisai | (United States) Danielle Collins (Romania) Simona Halep | (China) Wang Xinyu (Belgium) Alison Van Uytvanck (Russia) Veronika Kudermetova (Italy) Jasmine Paolini |

== Affected tournaments ==
The COVID-19 pandemic affected tournaments on both the ATP and WTA tours. The following tournaments were cancelled or postponed due to the COVID-19 pandemic.

| Week of | Tournament | Status |
|---|---|---|
| January 4 | Brisbane International; Brisbane, Australia; WTA 500; Hard | Cancelled |
| January 4 | Auckland Open; Auckland, New Zealand; WTA 250; Hard | Cancelled |
| January 4 | Shenzhen Open; Shenzhen, China; WTA 250; Hard | Cancelled |
| January 11 | Adelaide International; Adelaide, Australia; WTA 500; Hard | Postponed to 22 February |
| January 11 | Hobart International; Hobart, Australia; WTA 250; Hard | Cancelled |
| January 18; January 25 | Australian Open; Melbourne, Australia; Grand Slam; Hard | Postponed to 8 February |
| February 8 | St. Petersburg Trophy; Saint Petersburg, Russia; WTA 500; Hard (i) | Postponed to 15 March due to Australian Open reschedule |
| February 8 | Thailand Open; Hua Hin, Thailand; WTA 250; Hard | Cancelled |
| February 15 | Qatar Open; Doha, Qatar; WTA 500; Hard | Postponed to 1 March due to Australian Open reschedule |
| February 22 | Mexican Open; Acapulco, Mexico; WTA 250; Hard | Cancelled |
| March 8 March 15 | Indian Wells Open; Indian Wells, United States; WTA 1000 (Mandatory); Hard | Postponed to 4 October |
| April 12 | Billie Jean King Cup Finals; Budapest, Hungary; Clay (red) (i) – 12 teams | Postponed to 1 November and moved to Prague, Czech Republic |
| April 12 | Kunming Open; Anning, China; WTA 250; Clay (red) | Postponed |
| May 17 | Morocco Open; Rabat, Morocco; WTA 250; Clay | Cancelled |
| May 17 | Cologne Open; Cologne, Germany; WTA 250; Clay (red) | Cancelled |
| May 24 | French Open; Paris, France; Grand Slam; Clay (red) | Postponed to 31 May |
| June 7 | Rosmalen Grass Court Championships; Rosmalen, Netherlands; WTA 250; Grass | Cancelled |
| September 13 | Zhengzhou Open; Zhengzhou, China; WTA 500; Hard | Cancelled |
| September 13 | Japan Open; Hiroshima, Japan; WTA 250; Hard | Cancelled |
| September 20 | Pan Pacific Open; Tokyo, Japan; WTA 500; Hard | Cancelled |
| September 20 | Guangzhou Open; Guangzhou, China; WTA 250; Hard | Cancelled |
| September 20 | Korea Open; Seoul, South Korea; WTA 250; Hard | Postponed to 20 December as WTA 125 tournament |
| September 27 | Wuhan Open; Wuhan, China; WTA 1000 (Non-mandatory); Hard | Cancelled |
| October 4 | China Open; Beijing, China; WTA 1000 (Mandatory); Hard | Cancelled |
| October 11 | Hong Kong Open; Hong Kong, China; WTA 250; Hard | Cancelled |
| October 11 | Tianjin Open; Tianjin, China; WTA 250; Hard | Cancelled |
| October 11 | Linz Open; Linz, Austria; WTA 250; Hard (i) | Postponed to 8 November |
| October 18 | Jiangxi Open; Nanchang, China; WTA 250; Hard | Cancelled |
| November 1 | WTA Elite Trophy; Zhuhai, China; Year-end championships Hard | Cancelled |
| November 8 | WTA Finals; Shenzhen, China; Year-end championships Hard | Moved to Guadalajara, Mexico |

== Statistical information ==
These tables present the number of singles (S), doubles (D), and mixed doubles (X) titles won by each player and each nation during the season, within all the tournament categories of the 2019 WTA Tour: the Grand Slam tournaments, the year-end championships (the WTA Tour Championships and the WTA Elite Trophy), the WTA Premier tournaments (WTA 1000 and WTA 500), and the WTA 250. The players/nations are sorted by:

1. total number of titles (a doubles title won by two players representing the same nation counts as only one win for the nation);
2. cumulated importance of those titles (one Grand Slam win equalling two WTA 1000 wins, one year-end championships win equalling one-and-a-half WTA 1000 win, one WTA 1000 win equalling two WTA 500 wins, one WTA 500 win equalling two WTA 250 wins);
3. a singles > doubles > mixed doubles hierarchy;
4. alphabetical order (by family names for players).

=== Key ===
Grand Slam tournaments
Summer Olympics
Year-end championships
WTA 1000 (Mandatory)
WTA 1000 (Non-mandatory)
WTA 500
WTA 250

=== Titles won by player ===
| Total | Player | Grand Slam | | | Olympic Games | | | Year-end | | WTA 1000 (M) | | WTA 1000 (NM) | | WTA 500 | | WTA 250 | | Total | | |
| Total | Player | S | D | X | S | D | X | S | D | S | D | S | D | S | D | S | D | S | D | X |
|---|---|---|---|---|---|---|---|---|---|---|---|---|---|---|---|---|---|---|---|---|
| 9 | Barbora Krejčíková (CZE) | ● | ● | ● | | ● | | | ● | | ● | | | | ● | ● ● | | 3 | 5 | 1 |
| 6 | Ashleigh Barty (AUS) | ● | | | | | | | | ● | | ● | | ● ● | ● | | | 5 | 1 | 0 |
| 6 | Kateřina Siniaková (CZE) | | ● | | | ● | | | ● | | ● | | | | ● ● | | | 0 | 6 | 0 |
| 5 | Elise Mertens (BEL) | | ● ● | | | | | | | | ● | | | ● | | | ● | 1 | 4 | 0 |
| 5 | Desirae Krawczyk (USA) | | | ● ● ● | | | | | | | | | | | ● | | ● | 0 | 2 | 3 |
| 5 | Shuko Aoyama (JPN) | | | | | | | | | | ● | | | | ● ● ● | | ● | 0 | 5 | 0 |
| 5 | Ena Shibahara (JPN) | | | | | | | | | | ● | | | | ● ● ● | | ● | 0 | 5 | 0 |
| 4 | Aryna Sabalenka (BLR) | | ● | | | | | | | ● | | | | ● | ● | | | 2 | 2 | 0 |
| 4 | Anett Kontaveit (EST) | | | | | | | | | | | | | ● ● | | ● ● | | 4 | 0 | 0 |
| 3 | Zhang Shuai (CHN) | | ● | | | | | | | | | | ● | | ● | | | 0 | 3 | 0 |
| 3 | Garbiñe Muguruza (ESP) | | | | | | | ● | | | | ● | | ● | | | | 3 | 0 | 0 |
| 3 | Alexa Guarachi (CHI) | | | | | | | | | | | | ● | | ● | | ● | 0 | 3 | 0 |
| 3 | Darija Jurak (CRO) | | | | | | | | | | | | ● | | ● | | ● | 0 | 3 | 0 |
| 2 | Hsieh Su-wei (TPE) | | ● | | | | | | | | ● | | | | | | | 0 | 2 | 0 |
| 2 | Samantha Stosur (AUS) | | ● | | | | | | | | | | ● | | | | | 0 | 2 | 0 |
| 2 | Paula Badosa (ESP) | | | | | | | | | ● | | | | | | ● | | 2 | 0 | 0 |
| 2 | Iga Świątek (POL) | | | | | | | | | | | ● | | ● | | | | 2 | 0 | 0 |
| 2 | Jeļena Ostapenko (LAT) | | | | | | | | | | | | | ● | ● | | | 1 | 1 | 0 |
| 2 | Danielle Collins (USA) | | | | | | | | | | | | | ● | | ● | | 2 | 0 | 0 |
| 2 | Daria Kasatkina (RUS) | | | | | | | | | | | | | ● | | ● | | 2 | 0 | 0 |
| 2 | Veronika Kudermetova (RUS) | | | | | | | | | | | | | ● | | | ● | 1 | 1 | 0 |
| 2 | Nicole Melichar (USA) | | | | | | | | | | | | | | ● ● | | | 0 | 2 | 0 |
| 2 | Demi Schuurs (NED) | | | | | | | | | | | | | | ● ● | | | 0 | 2 | 0 |
| 2 | Andrea Petkovic (GER) | | | | | | | | | | | | | | ● | ● | | 1 | 1 | 0 |
| 2 | Nadiia Kichenok (UKR) | | | | | | | | | | | | | | ● | | ● | 0 | 2 | 0 |
| 2 | Andreja Klepač (SLO) | | | | | | | | | | | | | | ● | | ● | 0 | 2 | 0 |
| 2 | Raluca Olaru (ROU) | | | | | | | | | | | | | | ● | | ● | 0 | 2 | 0 |
| 2 | Clara Tauson (DEN) | | | | | | | | | | | | | | | ● ● | | 2 | 0 | 0 |
| 2 | Coco Gauff (USA) | | | | | | | | | | | | | | | ● | ● | 1 | 1 | 0 |
| 2 | Jasmine Paolini (ITA) | | | | | | | | | | | | | | | ● | ● | 1 | 1 | 0 |
| 2 | Astra Sharma (AUS) | | | | | | | | | | | | | | | ● | ● | 1 | 1 | 0 |
| 2 | Alison Van Uytvanck (BEL) | | | | | | | | | | | | | | | ● | ● | 1 | 1 | 0 |
| 2 | Marie Bouzková (CZE) | | | | | | | | | | | | | | | | ● ● | 0 | 2 | 0 |
| 2 | Natela Dzalamidze (RUS) | | | | | | | | | | | | | | | | ● ● | 0 | 2 | 0 |
| 2 | Lucie Hradecká (CZE) | | | | | | | | | | | | | | | | ● ● | 0 | 2 | 0 |
| 2 | Caty McNally (USA) | | | | | | | | | | | | | | | | ● ● | 0 | 2 | 0 |
| 2 | Ellen Perez (AUS) | | | | | | | | | | | | | | | | ● ● | 0 | 2 | 0 |
| 2 | Kamilla Rakhimova (RUS) | | | | | | | | | | | | | | | | ● ● | 0 | 2 | 0 |
| 1 | Naomi Osaka (JPN) | ● | | | | | | | | | | | | | | | | 1 | 0 | 0 |
| 1 | Emma Raducanu (GBR) | ● | | | | | | | | | | | | | | | | 1 | 0 | 0 |
| 1 | Belinda Bencic (SUI) | | | | ● | | | | | | | | | | | | | 1 | 0 | 0 |
| 1 | Anastasia Pavlyuchenkova (RUS) | | | | | | ● | | | | | | | | | | | 0 | 0 | 1 |
| 1 | Camila Giorgi (ITA) | | | | | | | | | | | ● | | | | | | 1 | 0 | 0 |
| 1 | Gabriela Dabrowski (CAN) | | | | | | | | | | | | ● | | | | | 0 | 1 | 0 |
| 1 | Sharon Fichman (CAN) | | | | | | | | | | | | ● | | | | | 0 | 1 | 0 |
| 1 | Giuliana Olmos (MEX) | | | | | | | | | | | | ● | | | | | 0 | 1 | 0 |
| 1 | Luisa Stefani (BRA) | | | | | | | | | | | | ● | | | | | 0 | 1 | 0 |
| 1 | Petra Kvitová (CZE) | | | | | | | | | | | | | ● | | | | 1 | 0 | 0 |
| 1 | Liudmila Samsonova (RUS) | | | | | | | | | | | | | ● | | | | 1 | 0 | 0 |
| 1 | Victoria Azarenka (BLR) | | | | | | | | | | | | | | ● | | | 0 | 1 | 0 |
| 1 | Jennifer Brady (USA) | | | | | | | | | | | | | | ● | | | 0 | 1 | 0 |
| 1 | Sania Mirza (IND) | | | | | | | | | | | | | | ● | | | 0 | 1 | 0 |
| 1 | Květa Peschke (CZE) | | | | | | | | | | | | | | ● | | | 0 | 1 | 0 |
| 1 | Sorana Cîrstea (ROU) | | | | | | | | | | | | | | | ● | | 1 | 0 | 0 |
| 1 | Leylah Fernandez (CAN) | | | | | | | | | | | | | | | ● | | 1 | 0 | 0 |
| 1 | Ons Jabeur (TUN) | | | | | | | | | | | | | | | ● | | 1 | 0 | 0 |
| 1 | Angelique Kerber (GER) | | | | | | | | | | | | | | | ● | | 1 | 0 | 0 |
| 1 | Johanna Konta (GBR) | | | | | | | | | | | | | | | ● | | 1 | 0 | 0 |
| 1 | Ann Li (USA) | | | | | | | | | | | | | | | ● | | 1 | 0 | 0 |
| 1 | Camila Osorio (COL) | | | | | | | | | | | | | | | ● | | 1 | 0 | 0 |
| 1 | Yulia Putintseva (KAZ) | | | | | | | | | | | | | | | ● | | 1 | 0 | 0 |
| 1 | Alison Riske (USA) | | | | | | | | | | | | | | | ● | | 1 | 0 | 0 |
| 1 | Elena-Gabriela Ruse (ROU) | | | | | | | | | | | | | | | ● | | 1 | 0 | 0 |
| 1 | Sara Sorribes Tormo (ESP) | | | | | | | | | | | | | | | ● | | 1 | 0 | 0 |
| 1 | Elina Svitolina (UKR) | | | | | | | | | | | | | | | ● | | 1 | 0 | 0 |
| 1 | Donna Vekić (CRO) | | | | | | | | | | | | | | | ● | | 1 | 0 | 0 |
| 1 | Maryna Zanevska (BEL) | | | | | | | | | | | | | | | ● | | 1 | 0 | 0 |
| 1 | Tamara Zidanšek (SLO) | | | | | | | | | | | | | | | ● | | 1 | 0 | 0 |
| 1 | Susan Bandecchi (SUI) | | | | | | | | | | | | | | | | ● | 0 | 1 | 0 |
| 1 | Hailey Baptiste (USA) | | | | | | | | | | | | | | | | ● | 0 | 1 | 0 |
| 1 | Irina Bara (ROU) | | | | | | | | | | | | | | | | ● | 0 | 1 | 0 |
| 1 | Mihaela Buzărnescu (ROU) | | | | | | | | | | | | | | | | ● | 0 | 1 | 0 |
| 1 | Anna Danilina (KAZ) | | | | | | | | | | | | | | | | ● | 0 | 1 | 0 |
| 1 | Caroline Dolehide (USA) | | | | | | | | | | | | | | | | ● | 0 | 1 | 0 |
| 1 | Ulrikke Eikeri (NOR) | | | | | | | | | | | | | | | | ● | 0 | 1 | 0 |
| 1 | Anna-Lena Friedsam (GER) | | | | | | | | | | | | | | | | ● | 0 | 1 | 0 |
| 1 | Ekaterine Gorgodze (GEO) | | | | | | | | | | | | | | | | ● | 0 | 1 | 0 |
| 1 | Kaja Juvan (SLO) | | | | | | | | | | | | | | | | ● | 0 | 1 | 0 |
| 1 | Anna Kalinskaya (RUS) | | | | | | | | | | | | | | | | ● | 0 | 1 | 0 |
| 1 | Lyudmyla Kichenok (UKR) | | | | | | | | | | | | | | | | ● | 0 | 1 | 0 |
| 1 | Aleksandra Krunić (SRB) | | | | | | | | | | | | | | | | ● | 0 | 1 | 0 |
| 1 | Viktória Kužmová (SVK) | | | | | | | | | | | | | | | | ● | 0 | 1 | 0 |
| 1 | Elixane Lechemia (FRA) | | | | | | | | | | | | | | | | ● | 0 | 1 | 0 |
| 1 | Lidziya Marozava (BLR) | | | | | | | | | | | | | | | | ● | 0 | 1 | 0 |
| 1 | Tereza Mihalíková (SVK) | | | | | | | | | | | | | | | | ● | 0 | 1 | 0 |
| 1 | Greet Minnen (BEL) | | | | | | | | | | | | | | | | ● | 0 | 1 | 0 |
| 1 | Asia Muhammad (USA) | | | | | | | | | | | | | | | | ● | 0 | 1 | 0 |
| 1 | Ingrid Neel (USA) | | | | | | | | | | | | | | | | ● | 0 | 1 | 0 |
| 1 | Monica Niculescu (ROU) | | | | | | | | | | | | | | | | ● | 0 | 1 | 0 |
| 1 | Makoto Ninomiya (JPN) | | | | | | | | | | | | | | | | ● | 0 | 1 | 0 |
| 1 | Ankita Raina (IND) | | | | | | | | | | | | | | | | ● | 0 | 1 | 0 |
| 1 | Erin Routliffe (NZL) | | | | | | | | | | | | | | | | ● | 0 | 1 | 0 |
| 1 | Arantxa Rus (NED) | | | | | | | | | | | | | | | | ● | 0 | 1 | 0 |
| 1 | Nina Stojanović (SRB) | | | | | | | | | | | | | | | | ● | 0 | 1 | 0 |
| 1 | Fanny Stollár (HUN) | | | | | | | | | | | | | | | | ● | 0 | 1 | 0 |
| 1 | Jil Teichmann (SUI) | | | | | | | | | | | | | | | | ● | 0 | 1 | 0 |
| 1 | Simona Waltert (SUI) | | | | | | | | | | | | | | | | ● | 0 | 1 | 0 |
| 1 | Wang Xinyu (CHN) | | | | | | | | | | | | | | | | ● | 0 | 1 | 0 |
| 1 | Zheng Saisai (CHN) | | | | | | | | | | | | | | | | ● | 0 | 1 | 0 |
| 1 | Kimberley Zimmermann (BEL) | | | | | | | | | | | | | | | | ● | 0 | 1 | 0 |

=== Titles won by nation ===
| Total | Nation | Grand Slam | | | Olympic Games | | | Year-end | | WTA 1000 (M) | | WTA 1000 (NM) | | WTA 500 | | WTA 250 | | Total | | |
| Total | Nation | S | D | X | S | D | X | S | D | S | D | S | D | S | D | S | D | S | D | X |
|---|---|---|---|---|---|---|---|---|---|---|---|---|---|---|---|---|---|---|---|---|
| 17 | United States (USA) | | | 3 | | | | | | | | | | 1 | 4 | 4 | 5 | 5 | 9 | 3 |
| 14 | Czech Republic (CZE) | 1 | 1 | 1 | | 1 | | | 1 | | 1 | | | 1 | 3 | 2 | 2 | 4 | 9 | 1 |
| 11 | Australia (AUS) | 1 | 1 | | | | | | | 1 | | 1 | 1 | 2 | 1 | 1 | 2 | 6 | 5 | 0 |
| 10 | Russia (RUS) | | | | | | 1 | | | | | | | 3 | | 1 | 5 | 4 | 5 | 1 |
| 9 | Belgium (BEL) | | 2 | | | | | | | | 1 | | | 1 | | 2 | 3 | 3 | 6 | 0 |
| 7 | Japan (JPN) | 1 | | | | | | | | | 1 | | | | 3 | | 2 | 1 | 6 | 0 |
| 7 | Romania (ROU) | | | | | | | | | | | | | | 1 | 2 | 4 | 2 | 5 | 0 |
| 6 | Spain (ESP) | | | | | | | 1 | | 1 | | 1 | | 1 | | 2 | | 6 | 0 | 0 |
| 5 | Belarus (BLR) | | 1 | | | | | | | 1 | | | | 1 | 1 | | 1 | 2 | 3 | 0 |
| 4 | China (CHN) | | 1 | | | | | | | | | | 1 | | 1 | | 1 | 0 | 4 | 0 |
| 4 | Croatia (CRO) | | | | | | | | | | | | 1 | | 1 | 1 | 1 | 1 | 3 | 0 |
| 4 | Estonia (EST) | | | | | | | | | | | | | 2 | | 2 | | 4 | 0 | 0 |
| 4 | Germany (GER) | | | | | | | | | | | | | | 1 | 2 | 1 | 2 | 2 | 0 |
| 4 | Slovenia (SLO) | | | | | | | | | | | | | | 1 | 1 | 2 | 1 | 3 | 0 |
| 4 | Ukraine (UKR) | | | | | | | | | | | | | | 1 | 1 | 2 | 1 | 3 | 0 |
| 3 | Switzerland (SUI) | | | | 1 | | | | | | | | | | | | 2 | 1 | 2 | 0 |
| 3 | Italy (ITA) | | | | | | | | | | | 1 | | | | 1 | 1 | 2 | 1 | 0 |
| 3 | Canada (CAN) | | | | | | | | | | | | 2 | | | 1 | | 1 | 2 | 0 |
| 3 | Chile (CHI) | | | | | | | | | | | | 1 | | 1 | | 1 | 0 | 3 | 0 |
| 3 | Netherlands (NED) | | | | | | | | | | | | | | 2 | | 1 | 0 | 3 | 0 |
| 2 | Great Britain (GBR) | 1 | | | | | | | | | | | | | | 1 | | 2 | 0 | 0 |
| 2 | Chinese Taipei (TPE) | | 1 | | | | | | | | 1 | | | | | | | 0 | 2 | 0 |
| 2 | Poland (POL) | | | | | | | | | | | 1 | | 1 | | | | 2 | 0 | 0 |
| 2 | Latvia (LAT) | | | | | | | | | | | | | 1 | 1 | | | 1 | 1 | 0 |
| 2 | India (IND) | | | | | | | | | | | | | | 1 | | 1 | 0 | 2 | 0 |
| 2 | Denmark (DEN) | | | | | | | | | | | | | | | 2 | | 2 | 0 | 0 |
| 2 | Kazakhstan (KAZ) | | | | | | | | | | | | | | | 1 | 1 | 1 | 1 | 0 |
| 2 | Slovakia (SVK) | | | | | | | | | | | | | | | | 2 | 0 | 2 | 0 |
| 1 | Brazil (BRA) | | | | | | | | | | | | 1 | | | | | 0 | 1 | 0 |
| 1 | Mexico (MEX) | | | | | | | | | | | | 1 | | | | | 0 | 1 | 0 |
| 1 | Colombia (COL) | | | | | | | | | | | | | | | 1 | | 1 | 0 | 0 |
| 1 | Tunisia (TUN) | | | | | | | | | | | | | | | 1 | | 1 | 0 | 0 |
| 1 | France (FRA) | | | | | | | | | | | | | | | | 1 | 0 | 1 | 0 |
| 1 | Georgia (GEO) | | | | | | | | | | | | | | | | 1 | 0 | 1 | 0 |
| 1 | Hungary (HUN) | | | | | | | | | | | | | | | | 1 | 0 | 1 | 0 |
| 1 | New Zealand (NZL) | | | | | | | | | | | | | | | | 1 | 0 | 1 | 0 |
| 1 | Norway (NOR) | | | | | | | | | | | | | | | | 1 | 0 | 1 | 0 |
| 1 | Serbia (SRB) | | | | | | | | | | | | | | | | 1 | 0 | 1 | 0 |

=== Titles information ===
The following players won their first main circuit title in singles, doubles, or mixed doubles:

Singles

- (Denmark) Clara Tauson (18 years, 76 days) – Lyon (draw)
- (Spain) Sara Sorribes Tormo (24 years, 156 days) – Guadalajara (draw)
- (Canada) Leylah Fernandez (18 years, 196 days) – Monterrey (draw)
- (Colombia) Camila Osorio (19 years, 110 days) – Bogotá (draw)
- (Russia) Veronika Kudermetova (23 years, 352 days) – Charleston 1 (draw)
- (Australia) Astra Sharma (25 years, 219 days) – Charleston 2 (draw)
- (Spain) Paula Badosa (23 years, 188 days) – Belgrade (draw)
- (Czech Republic) Barbora Krejčíková (25 years, 162 days) – Strasbourg (draw)
- (Tunisia) Ons Jabeur (26 years, 296 days) – Birmingham (draw)
- (Russia) Liudmila Samsonova (22 years, 221 days) – Berlin (draw)
- (Romania) Elena-Gabriela Ruse (23 years, 247 days) – Hamburg (draw)
- (Slovenia) Tamara Zidanšek (23 years, 204 days) – Lausanne (draw)
- (Belgium) Maryna Zanevska (27 years, 335 days) – Gdynia (draw)
- (United States) Danielle Collins (27 years, 224 days) – Palermo (draw)
- (United Kingdom) Emma Raducanu (18 years, 302 days) – **US Open (draw)**
- (Italy) Jasmine Paolini (25 years, 249 days) – Portorož (draw)
- (United States) Ann Li (21 years, 120 days) – Tenerife (draw)

Doubles

- (India) Ankita Raina – Melbourne 4 (draw)
- (Russia) Kamilla Rakhimova – Melbourne 4 (draw)
- (United States) Caroline Dolehide – Monterrey (draw)
- (France) Elixane Lechemia – Bogotá (draw)
- (United States) Ingrid Neel – Bogotá (draw)
- (United States) Hailey Baptiste – Charleston 2 (draw)
- (United States) Jennifer Brady – Stuttgart (draw)
- (Czech Republic) Marie Bouzková – Birmingham (draw)
- (Italy) Jasmine Paolini – Hamburg (draw)
- (Switzerland) Jil Teichmann – Hamburg (draw)
- (Switzerland) Susan Bandecchi – Lausanne (draw)
- (Switzerland) Simona Waltert – Lausanne (draw)
- (Kazakhstan) Anna Danilina – Gdynia (draw)
- (New Zealand) Erin Routliffe – Palermo (draw)
- (Belgium) Kimberley Zimmermann – Palermo (draw)
- (Russia) Natela Dzalamidze – Cluj-Napoca (draw)
- (Slovenia) Kaja Juvan – Cluj-Napoca (draw)
- (Slovakia) Tereza Mihalíková – Portorož (draw)
- (Germany) Andrea Petkovic – Chicago (draw)
- (Norway) Ulrikke Eikeri – Tenerife (draw)
- (Romania) Irina Bara – Cluj-Napoca 2 (draw)
- (Georgia (country)) Ekaterine Gorgodze – Cluj-Napoca 2 (draw)

Mixed doubles

- (United States) Desirae Krawczyk – **Roland Garros (draw)**
- Anastasia Pavlyuchenkova (ROC) – 2020 Summer Olympics (draw)

The following players defended a main circuit title in singles, doubles, or mixed doubles:

Singles

- (Australia) Ashleigh Barty – Miami (draw)

Doubles

- (Chinese Taipei) Hsieh Su-wei – **Wimbledon (draw)**
- (Czech Republic) Lucie Hradecká – Prague (draw)
- (Belgium) Elise Mertens – Indian Wells (draw)

Mixed doubles

- (Czech Republic) Barbora Krejčíková – **Australian Open (draw)**

=== Best ranking ===
The following players achieved their career high ranking in this season inside top 50 (in bold the players who entered the top 10 for the first time).

(Note: Name and ranking in bold means the player entered top 10 for the first time, and only the ranking in bold means the player had entered top 10 before, but it's his/her highest ranking.)
Singles

- (United States) Jennifer Brady (reached place No. 13 on February 22)
- (France) Fiona Ferro (reached place No. 39 on March 8)
- (Russia) Veronika Kudermetova (reached place No. 28 on April 26)
- (Czech Republic) Karolína Muchová (reached place No. 19 on May 17)
- (United States) Shelby Rogers (reached place No. 40 on July 12)
- (Belarus) Aryna Sabalenka (reached place **No. 2** on August 23)
- (United States) Cori Gauff (reached place No. 19 on September 13)
- (Poland) **Iga Świątek** (reached place **No. 4** on September 27)
- (Argentina) Nadia Podoroska (reached place No. 35 on September 27)
- (Spain) Sara Sorribes Tormo (reached place No. 34 on October 18)
- (Czech Republic) **Barbora Krejčíková** (reached place **No. 3** on November 1)
- (Greece) **Maria Sakkari** (reached place **No. 6** on November 1)
- (Tunisia) **Ons Jabeur** (reached place **No. 7** on November 1)
- (United States) Ann Li (reached place No. 47 on November 1)
- (Czech Republic) Tereza Martincová (reached place No. 48 on November 1)
- (Ukraine) Marta Kostyuk (reached place No. 50 on November 1)
- (Russia) Anastasia Pavlyuchenkova (reached place No. 11 on November 8)
- (Kazakhstan) Elena Rybakina (reached place No. 14 on November 8)
- (Canada) Leylah Annie Fernandez (reached place No. 24 on November 8)
- (Russia) Liudmila Samsonova (reached place No. 39 on November 8)
- (Switzerland) Viktorija Golubic (reached place No. 43 on November 8)
- (Denmark) Clara Tauson (reached place No. 44 on November 8)
- (Estonia) **Anett Kontaveit** (reached place **No. 7** on November 15)
- (Spain) **Paula Badosa** (reached place **No. 8** on November 15)
- (United States) Jessica Pegula (reached place No. 18 on November 15)
- (United Kingdom) Emma Raducanu (reached place No. 19 on November 15)
- (Slovenia) Tamara Zidanšek (reached place No. 30 on November 15)
- (Switzerland) Jil Teichmann (reached place No. 37 on November 15)

Doubles

- (United States) Sofia Kenin (reached place No. 29 on January 25)
- (Belarus) Aryna Sabalenka (reached place **No. 1** on February 22)
- (Slovakia) Viktória Kužmová (reached place No. 27 on March 8)
- (Belgium) Elise Mertens (reached place **No. 1** on May 10)
- (United States) **Nicole Melichar** (reached place **No. 9** on May 17)
- (United States) Desirae Krawczyk (reached place No. 17 on May 17)
- (United States) Hayley Carter (reached place No. 25 on June 14)
- (United States) Caroline Dolehide (reached place No. 25 on August 16)
- (United States) Asia Muhammad (reached place No. 31 on August 23)
- (Germany) Laura Siegemund (reached place No. 30 on August 23)
- (Serbia) Nina Stojanović (reached place No. 40 on September 13)
- (Chile) Alexa Guarachi (reached place No. 11 on September 20)
- (United States) Jessica Pegula (reached place No. 46 on October 4)
- (Canada) Gabriela Dabrowski (reached place **No. 5** on October 18)
- (China) Zhang Shuai (reached place **No. 8** on October 18)
- (Poland) Iga Świątek (reached place No. 41 on October 18)
- (Kazakhstan) Elena Rybakina (reached place No. 48 on October 18)
- (United States) Bernarda Pera (reached place No. 50 on October 18)
- (Brazil) **Luisa Stefani** (reached place **No. 9** on November 1)
- (Russia) Veronika Kudermetova (reached place No. 11 on November 1)
- (United States) Catherine McNally (reached place No. 16 on November 8)
- (United States) Cori Gauff (reached place No. 17 on November 8)
- (Australia) Storm Sanders (reached place No. 30 on November 8)
- (Ukraine) Nadiia Kichenok (reached place No. 31 on November 8)
- (Czech Republic) Marie Bouzková (reached place No. 34 on November 8)
- (Japan) Ena Shibahara (reached place **No. 5** on November 15)
- (Japan) Shuko Aoyama (reached place **No. 5** on November 15)
- (Croatia) **Darija Jurak** (reached place **No. 9** on November 15)
- (Mexico) Giuliana Olmos (reached place No. 18 on November 15)
- (Canada) Sharon Fichman (reached place No. 22 on November 15)

== WTA rankings ==
These are the WTA rankings and yearly WTA Race rankings of the top 20 singles and doubles players at the current date of the 2021 season.

=== Singles ===
Final WTA Singles race rankings
| No. | Player | Points | Tourn |
|---|---|---|---|
| 1 | Ashleigh Barty (AUS) | 6,411 | 13 |
| 2 | Aryna Sabalenka (BLR) | 4,768 | 17 |
| 3 | Barbora Krejčíková (CZE) | 4,518 | 16 |
| 4 | Karolína Plíšková (CZE) | 4,036 | 17 |
| 5 | Maria Sakkari (GRE) | 3,341 | 17 |
| 6 | Iga Świątek (POL) | 3,226 | 14 |
| 7 | Garbiñe Muguruza (ESP) | 3,195 | 18 |
| 8 | Paula Badosa (ESP) | 3,112 | 16 |
| 9 | Anett Kontaveit (EST) | 3,096 | 20 |
| 10 | Ons Jabeur (TUN) | 3,020 | 19 |
| 11 | Naomi Osaka (JPN) | 2,771 | 10 |
| 12 | Anastasia Pavlyuchenkova (RUS) | 2,548 | 18 |
| 13 | Elina Svitolina (UKR) | 2,501 | 20 |
| 14 | Jessica Pegula (USA) | 2,500 | 18 |
| 15 | Elise Mertens (BEL) | 2,447 | 19 |
| 16 | Angelique Kerber (GER) | 2,387 | 16 |
| 17 | Cori Gauff (USA) | 2,380 | 17 |
| 18 | Emma Raducanu (GBR) | 2,352 | 6 |
| 19 | Belinda Bencic (SUI) | 2,195 | 20 |
| 20 | Victoria Azarenka (BLR) | 2,165 | 14 |

Champion
Runner-up

Competed at the 2021 WTA Finals.
Player withdrew.

WTA Singles Year-End Rankings
| # | Player | Points | #Trn | '20 Rk | High | Low | '20→'21 |
|---|---|---|---|---|---|---|---|
| 1 | Ashleigh Barty (AUS) | 7,582 | 16 | 1 | 1 | 1 | Steady |
| 2 | Aryna Sabalenka (BLR) | 6,380 | 20 | 10 | 2 | 10 | ▲8 |
| 3 | Garbiñe Muguruza (ESP) | 5,685 | 21 | 15 | 3 | 16 | ▲12 |
| 4 | Karolína Plíšková (CZE) | 5,135 | 19 | 6 | 3 | 13 | ▲2 |
| 5 | Barbora Krejčíková (CZE) | 5,008 | 29 | 65 | 3 | 66 | ▲60 |
| 6 | Maria Sakkari (GRE) | 4,385 | 21 | 22 | 6 | 25 | ▲16 |
| 7 | Anett Kontaveit (EST) | 4,351 | 23 | 23 | 7 | 31 | ▲16 |
| 8 | Paula Badosa (ESP) | 3,849 | 32 | 70 | 8 | 73 | ▲62 |
| 9 | Iga Świątek (POL) | 3,786 | 16 | 17 | 4 | 17 | ▲8 |
| 10 | Ons Jabeur (TUN) | 3,455 | 21 | 31 | 7 | 31 | ▲21 |
| 11 | Anastasia Pavlyuchenkova (RUS) | 3,076 | 20 | 38 | 11 | 46 | ▲27 |
| 12 | Sofia Kenin (USA) | 2,971 | 16 | 4 | 4 | 15 | ▼8 |
| 13 | Naomi Osaka (JPN) | 2,956 | 11 | 3 | 2 | 13 | ▼10 |
| 14 | Elena Rybakina (KAZ) | 2,855 | 29 | 19 | 14 | 23 | ▲5 |
| 15 | Elina Svitolina (UKR) | 2,726 | 23 | 5 | 4 | 15 | ▼10 |
| 16 | Angelique Kerber (GER) | 2,671 | 18 | 25 | 9 | 28 | ▲9 |
| 17 | Petra Kvitová (CZE) | 2,660 | 20 | 8 | 8 | 19 | ▼9 |
| 18 | Jessica Pegula (USA) | 2,650 | 22 | 63 | 18 | 64 | ▲45 |
| 19 | Emma Raducanu (GBR) | 2,627 | 18 | 345 | 19 | 366 | ▲326 |
| 20 | Simona Halep (ROU) | 2,576 | 17 | 2 | 2 | 22 | ▼18 |

==== Number 1 ranking ====
| Holder | Date gained | Date forfeited |
|---|---|---|
| Ashleigh Barty (AUS) | Year end 2020 | Year end 2021 |

=== Doubles ===
Final Doubles team race rankings
| No. | Team | Points | Tourn |
|---|---|---|---|
| 1 | Barbora Krejčíková (CZE); Kateřina Siniaková (CZE) | 6,450 | 9 |
| 2 | Shuko Aoyama (JPN); Ena Shibahara (JPN) | 5,070 | 14 |
| 3 | Hsieh Su-wei (TPE); Elise Mertens (BEL) | 3,892 | 5 |
| 4 | Nicole Melichar (USA); Demi Schuurs (NED) | 3,440 | 12 |
| 5 | Samantha Stosur (AUS); Shuai Zhang (CHN) | 2,911 | 10 |
| 6 | Catherine McNally (USA); Coco Gauff (USA) | 2,770 | 3 |
| 7 | Alexa Guarachi (CHI); Desirae Krawczyk (USA) | 2,695 | 14 |
| 8 | Darija Jurak (CRO); Andreja Klepač (SLO) | 2,650 | 14 |
| 9 | Gabriela Dabrowski (CAN); Luisa Stefani (BRA) | 2,570 | 3 |
| 10 | Sharon Fichman (CAN); Giuliana Olmos (MEX) | 2,491 | 10 |

Champion
Runner-up

Competed at the 2021 WTA Finals.
Team withdrew.

WTA Doubles Year-End Rankings
| # | Player | Points | #Trn | '20 Rk | High | Low | '20→'21 |
|---|---|---|---|---|---|---|---|
| 1 | Kateřina Siniaková (CZE) | 8,365 | 15 | 8 | 1 | 8 | ▲7 |
| 2 | Barbora Krejčíková (CZE) | 8,200 | 15 | 7 | 1 | 7 | ▲5 |
| 3 | Hsieh Su-wei (TPE) | 7,985 | 17 | 1 | 1 | 5 | ▼2 |
| 4 | Elise Mertens (BEL) | 7,495 | 18 | 6 | 1 | 8 | ▲2 |
| 5 | Shuko Aoyama (JPN) | 5,735 | 24 | 22 | 5 | 22 | ▲17 |
| 5 | Ena Shibahara (JPN) | 5,735 | 32 | 23 | 5 | 23 | ▲18 |
| 7 | Gabriela Dabrowski (CAN) | 5,355 | 18 | 10 | 5 | 15 | ▲3 |
| 8 | Zhang Shuai (CHN) | 4,990 | 31 | 27 | 8 | 50 | ▲19 |
| 9 | Darija Jurak (CRO) | 4,855 | 25 | 48 | 9 | 49 | ▲39 |
| 10 | Luisa Stefani (BRA) | 4,525 | 33 | 33 | 9 | 33 | ▲23 |
| 11 | Demi Schuurs (NED) | 4,855 | 32 | 12 | 9 | 17 | ▲1 |
| 12 | Nicole Melichar-Martinez (USA) | 4,230 | 23 | 11 | 9 | 19 | ▼1 |
| 13 | Alexa Guarachi (CHL) | 4,090 | 31 | 26 | 11 | 26 | ▲13 |
| 14 | Veronika Kudermetova (RUS) | 4,090 | 20 | 24 | 11 | 29 | ▲10 |
| 15 | Bethanie Mattek-Sands (USA) | 3,570 | 19 | 20 | 13 | 23 | ▲5 |
| 16 | Samantha Stosur (AUS) | 3,541 | 13 | 31 | 16 | 101 | ▲15 |
| 17 | Desirae Krawczyk (USA) | 3,535 | 30 | 25 | 17 | 26 | ▲8 |
| 18 | Giuliana Olmos (MEX) | 3,400 | 27 | 61 | 18 | 61 | ▲43 |
| 19 | Andreja Klepač (SLO) | 3,390 | 28 | 38 | 19 | 42 | ▲19 |
| 20 | Catherine McNally (USA) | 3,385 | 31 | 42 | 16 | 48 | ▲22 |

==== Number 1 ranking ====
| Holder | Date gained | Date forfeited |
|---|---|---|
| Hsieh Su-wei (TPE) | Year end 2020 | 21 February 2021 |
| Aryna Sabalenka (BLR) | 22 February 2021 | 4 April 2021 |
| Hsieh Su-wei (TPE) | 5 April 2021 | 9 May 2021 |
| Elise Mertens (BEL) | 10 May 2021 | 16 May 2021 |
| Kristina Mladenovic (FRA) | 17 May 2021 | 13 June 2021 |
| Barbora Krejčíková (CZE) | 14 June 2021 | 11 July 2021 |
| Elise Mertens (BEL) | 12 July 2021 | 12 September 2021 |
| Hsieh Su-wei (TPE) | 13 September 2021 | 19 September 2021 |
| Elise Mertens (BEL) | 20 September 2021 | 26 September 2021 |
| Barbora Krejčíková (CZE) | 27 September 2021 | 17 October 2021 |
| Elise Mertens (BEL) | 18 October 2021 | 24 October 2021 |
| Hsieh Su-wei (TPE) | 25 October 2021 | 31 October 2021 |
| Elise Mertens (BEL) | 1 November 2021 | 7 November 2021 |
| Hsieh Su-wei (TPE) | 8 November 2021 | 21 November 2021 |
| Kateřina Siniaková (CZE) | 22 November 2021 | Year end 2021 |

== Points distribution ==
| Category | W | F | SF | QF | R16 | R32 | R64 | R128 | Q | Q3 | Q2 | Q1 |
| Grand Slam (S) | 2000 | 1300 | 780 | 430 | 240 | 130 | 70 | 10 | 40 | 30 | 20 | 2 |
| Grand Slam (D) | 2000 | 1300 | 780 | 430 | 240 | 130 | 10 | – | 40 | – | – | – |
| WTA Finals (S) | 1500* | 1080* | 750* | (+125 per round robin match; +125 per round robin win) | | | | | | | | |
| WTA Finals (D) | 1500 | 1080 | 750 | 375 | – | | | | | | | |
| WTA 1000 (96S) | 1000 | 650 | 390 | 215 | 120 | 65 | 35 | 10 | 30 | – | 20 | 2 |
| WTA 1000 (64/60S) | 1000 | 650 | 390 | 215 | 120 | 65 | 10 | – | 30 | – | 20 | 2 |
| WTA 1000 (28/32D) | 1000 | 650 | 390 | 215 | 120 | 10 | – | – | – | – | – | – |
| WTA 1000 (56S, 48Q/32Q) | 900 | 585 | 350 | 190 | 105 | 60 | 1 | – | 30 | – | 20 | 1 |
| WTA 1000 (28D) | 900 | 585 | 350 | 190 | 105 | 1 | – | – | – | – | – | – |
| WTA 500 (64/56S) | 470 | 305 | 185 | 100 | 55 | 30 | 1 | – | 25 | – | 13 | 1 |
| WTA 500 (32/30/28S) | 470 | 305 | 185 | 100 | 55 | 1 | – | – | 25 | 18 | 13 | 1 |
| WTA 500 (28D) | 470 | 305 | 185 | 100 | 55 | 1 | – | – | – | – | – | – |
| WTA 500 (16D) | 470 | 305 | 185 | 100 | 1 | – | – | – | – | – | – | – |
| WTA Elite Trophy (S) | 700* | 440* | 240* | (+40 per round robin match; +80 per round robin win) | | | | | | | | |
| WTA 250 (32S, 32Q) | 280 | 180 | 110 | 60 | 30 | 1 | – | – | 18 | 14 | 10 | 1 |
| WTA 250 (32S, 24/16Q) | 280 | 180 | 110 | 60 | 30 | 1 | – | – | 18 | – | 12 | 1 |
| WTA 250 (28D) | 280 | 180 | 110 | 60 | 30 | 1 | – | – | – | – | – | – |
| WTA 250 (16D) | 280 | 180 | 110 | 60 | 1 | – | – | – | – | – | – | – |

S = singles players, D = doubles teams, Q = qualification players.
* Assumes undefeated round robin match record.

== Prize money leaders ==
Prize money in US$ as of November 15, 2021
| # | Player | Singles | Doubles | Mixed doubles | Year-to-date |
|---|---|---|---|---|---|
| 1 | Ashleigh Barty (AUS) | $3,914,987 | $30,195 | $0 | $3,945,182 |
| 2 | Barbora Krejčíková (CZE) | $2,969,248 | $616,781 | $60,854 | $3,646,883 |
| 3 | Aryna Sabalenka (BLR) | $2,664,681 | $235,522 | $0 | $2,909,281 |
| 4 | Karolína Plíšková (CZE) | $2,829,000 | $39,865 | $0 | $2,868,865 |
| 5 | Garbiñe Muguruza (ESP) | $2,827,274 | $3,905 | $0 | $2,846,871 |
| 6 | Emma Raducanu (GBR) | $2,807,446 | $0 | $0 | $2,807,446 |
| 7 | Paula Badosa (ESP) | $2,602,330 | $52,132 | $0 | $2,655,962 |
| 8 | Naomi Osaka (JPN) | $2,306,222 | $0 | $0 | $2,306,222 |
| 9 | Elise Mertens (BEL) | $1,162,626 | $933,007 | $0 | $2,098,133 |
| 10 | Maria Sakkari (GRE) | $2,021,970 | $8,020 | $0 | $2,029,990 |

== Comebacks ==
The following is a list of notable players (winners of a main tour title, and/or part of the WTA rankings top 100 in singles, or top 100 in doubles, for at least one week) who returned from retirement or inactivity during the 2021 season:

- (Spain) Carla Suárez Navarro (born 3 September 1988 in Las Palmas de Gran Canaria) In April 2021, Suárez Navarro announced that her Hodgkin's Lymphoma was in complete remission, and that she would commence a farewell tour beginning at Roland-Garros and culminating in a final US Open appearance, where she lost in the first round to Danielle Collins.
- (Russia) Elena Vesnina (born 1 August 1986 in Lviv, Ukraine SSR, Soviet Union, modern day Ukraine) turned professional in 2002 and reached a career high ranking of 13 in singles in 2017 and number 1 in doubles in 2018. Vesnina's best result in a Grand Slam came at the 2016 Wimbledon championships, where she fell to Serena Williams in the semifinals in straight sets. She also won three WTA singles titles during her career. Her biggest success was in doubles, with 3 Grand Slam women's doubles titles alongside Ekaterina Makarova at the 2013 French Open, the 2014 US Open and at Wimbledon in 2017, as well as the mixed doubles title at the 2016 Australian Open alongside Bruno Soares. She also partnered Makarova to gold in the women's doubles at the 2016 Olympics, and to the title at the WTA Finals, both in 2016. Vesnina had been absent from the WTA Tour since 2018 following the birth of her daughter.
- Kim Clijsters (born 8 June 1983 in Bilzen, Belgium) initially entered the 2021 Miami Open, but pulled out, saying she did not feel ready to compete after her surgery and contracting COVID-19 in January. She played her first tournament of the year at the 2021 Chicago Fall Tennis Classic after accepting a wildcard, but lost in the first round to Hsieh Su-wei.

== Retirements ==
The following is a list of notable players (winners of a main tour title, and/or part of the WTA rankings top 100 in singles, or top 100 in doubles, for at least one week) who announced their retirement from professional tennis, became inactive (after not playing for more than 52 weeks), or were permanently banned from playing, during the 2021 season:

- Gréta Arn (born 13 April 1979 in Budapest, Hungary) joined the professional tour in 1997 and reached a career-high ranking of No. 40 in singles in May 2011 and No. 175 in doubles in December 2000. She won two singles titles in her career.
- Timea Bacsinszky (born 8 June 1989 in Lausanne, Switzerland), has won four WTA singles titles in her 15-year career, where she reached a career high of No.9, and five doubles titles. She reached the semifinals of French Open in singles in 2015 and 2017. She also won a silver medal in doubles with Martina Hingis at 2016 Rio Olympics. Bacsinszky announced her retirement on 16 July due to constant injuries.
- Kiki Bertens (born 10 December 1991 in Wateringen, Netherlands) turned professional in 2009, and reached a career high ranking of No. 4 in singles on 13 May 2019, becoming the highest ranking female Dutch player in WTA history; she had a career high doubles ranking of No. 16 in the world, achieved on 16 April 2018. She won 10 WTA singles titles, including two WTA 1000 titles at the 2018 Western & Southern Open and the 2019 Mutua Madrid Open, and also won 10 WTA doubles titles. Furthermore, she reached the quarterfinals of the 2017 Wimbledon Championships, and the semifinals on the 2016 French Open. She announced on 16 June 2021 that 2021 will be her final season due to ongoing injuries, and that her final event would be the 2020 Summer Olympics in Tokyo. Bertens officially retired from the sport after opening round defeats in both singles and doubles at the Olympics, ranked No. 24 in singles and No. 112 in doubles.
- Nicole Gibbs (born 3 March 1993 in Cincinnati, United States) joined the professional tour in 2013 and reached a career-high ranking of No. 68 in singles in July 2016 and No. 107 in doubles in September 2016. She announced her retirement in February 2021 after battling with oral cancer in 2019 and plans to attend law school.
- (Germany) Anna-Lena Grönefeld
- (Serbia) Bojana Jovanovski Petrović
- Vania King (born 3 February 1989 in Monterey Park, California, United States) turned professional in 2006 and reached a career high ranking of 50 in singles and 3 in doubles. King reached three WTA singles finals during her career, winning one of them at the Bangkok Open in 2006. She was most known as a doubles specialist, winning fifteen titles in her career, with her biggest achievements coming in winning the women's doubles events at both Wimbledon and the US Open in 2010, alongside Yaroslava Shvedova. King was hampered by an ankle injury throughout the final years of her career, and despite undergoing surgery in 2017, King decided to retire in February 2020 however due to the impacts from the COVID-19 pandemic, she officially retired in April 2021 following a farewell tour.
- (United Kingdom) Johanna Konta (born 17 May 1991 in Sydney, Australia) turned professional in 2008, initially representing Australia, before switching allegiance to Great Britain in 2012. She reached a career high singles ranking of No. 4 in the world on 17 July 2017, becoming the first British woman since Jo Durie to be ranked inside the top ten; she had a career high doubles ranking of No. 88 in the world, achieved on 1 August 2016. Konta won four WTA singles titles, including a Premier Mandatory title at the 2017 Miami Open, and became the first British woman to win a singles title on home soil since Sue Barker did so in 1981, doing so at the 2021 Nottingham Open. She reached the quarterfinals or better at all four Grand Slams, including reaching the semifinals at the 2016 Australian Open, 2017 Wimbledon Championships, and the 2019 French Open. Konta announced her retirement on 1 December 2021, after suffering from a long-term knee injury, and a rankings slide to No. 113 in the world.
- Alla Kudryavtseva (born 3 November 1987 in Moscow, Russia) turned professional in 2005 and reached a career high ranking of No. 56 in singles and No. 15 in doubles. Kudryavtseva reached two WTA singles finals during her career, winning one of them at the 2010 Tashkent Open. She was better known for her doubles prowess, winning nine doubles titles throughout her career, and reached the quarterfinals in women's doubles events at the Australian Open, Wimbledon Championships, and the US Open. She announced that she had retired from the sport on Instagram, on 2 November 2021.
- Yaroslava Shvedova (born 12 September 1987 in Moscow, Russia), turned professional in September 2005, representing Russia; Shvedova switched representation to Kazakhstan in 2008. She reached a career-high singles ranking of No. 25 in the world on 29 October 2012; she attained a career-high doubles ranking of No. 3 in the world on 22 February 2016. She reached two WTA singles finals, winning her only title at the 2007 Bangalore Open; she also reached the quarterfinals of three Grand Slam events in singles, at the 2010 and 2012 French Opens, and the 2016 Wimbledon Championships. Known for her doubles prowess, Shvedova won 13 WTA doubles titles, including two Grand Slam titles at the 2010 Wimbledon Championships and 2010 US Open, partnering Vania King; she also reached four further Grand Slam doubles finals, and reached the final of the 2010 French Open in mixed doubles partnering Julian Knowle. Shvedova holds the distinction of being the only player in tennis history to score a golden set in a Grand Slam main match; she achieved this feat in her third round match against then-world No. 10 Sara Errani at the 2012 Wimbledon Championships. Shvedova retired on 2 October 2021, after a commemorative ceremony held at the 2021 Astana Open, in Nur-Sultan.
- (United States) Abigail Spears
- Barbora Strýcová (born 28 March 1986 in Plzeň, Czech Republic), the No. 2 player in doubles as of 5 April 2021 and former No. 1 player (from July 2019), announced her retirement on 4 May 2021. Strýcová joined the professional tour in 2002 and reached a career-high ranking of No. 16 in singles in January 2017. She has won 31 doubles titles and 2 singles titles (Québec 2011, Linz 2017), as well as the bronze medal in women's doubles at the 2016 Olympics. She reached the singles semifinals and won the women's doubles title at the 2019 Wimbledon Championships and was also a member of the winning Czech Fed Cup team in 2011, 2012, 2014, 2015, 2016, and 2018.
- Carla Suárez Navarro (born 3 September 1988 in Las Palmas de Gran Canaria, Spain) turned professional in 2003. Suárez Navarro reached a career-high singles ranking of No. 6 in the world on 29 February 2016; her career-high doubles ranking was No. 11, achieved on 27 April 2015. Suárez Navarro won two WTA singles titles, including a WTA 1000 title at the 2016 Qatar Open, and won three WTA doubles titles. She also reached the quarterfinals in singles on multiple occasions at the Australian Open, French Open, and the US Open. In doubles, she reached the semifinals of the 2014 French Open, and the final of the 2015 WTA Finals, both with Garbiñe Muguruza. Suárez Navarro previously announced her retirement in 2020; in September 2020, she was diagnosed with Hodgkin lymphoma. In April 2021, She announced that her cancer was in complete remission, and that she would commence a farewell tour beginning at Roland-Garros. She retired from the sport after her participation at the 2020–21 Billie Jean King Cup Finals, in November 2021.

== See also ==
- 2021 WTA 125 tournaments
- 2021 ITF Women's World Tennis Tour
- International Tennis Federation
- 2021 ATP Tour
