= 2021 Ladies Open Lausanne – Doubles =

Doubles
- 2021 Ladies Open Lausanne

Final
- Champions: (Switzerland) Susan Bandecchi (Switzerland) Simona Waltert
- Runners-up: (Norway) Ulrikke Eikeri (Greece) Valentini Grammatikopoulou
- Score: 6–3, 6–7^{(3–7)}, [10–5]

Events
Singles	Doubles
← 2019 ·	WTA Swiss Open	· 2022 →

Anastasia Potapova and Yana Sizikova were the defending champions, but they decided not to participate this year.

Susan Bandecchi and Simona Waltert won the title, defeating Ulrikke Eikeri and Valentini Grammatikopoulou in the final, 6–3, 6–7^{(3–7)}, [10–5]. This was this first WTA Tour doubles title won by both Bandecchi and Waltert.

== Seeds ==
1. (Russia) Anna Blinkova / (Germany) Anna-Lena Friedsam (withdrew)
2. (Switzerland) Jil Teichmann / (Slovenia) Tamara Zidanšek (first round, withdrew)
3. (Japan) Eri Hozumi / (China) Zhang Shuai (semifinals)
4. (Poland) Katarzyna Piter / (Netherlands) Arantxa Rus (first round, withdrew)

== Draw ==
=== Key ===
- Q = Qualifier
- WC = Wild card
- LL = Lucky loser
- Alt = Alternate
- SE = Special exempt
- PR = Protected ranking
- ITF = ITF entry
- JE = Junior exempt
- w/o = Walkover
- r = Retired
- d = Defaulted
- SR = Special ranking

=== Draw ===
First round
Alt	(Romania) E Bogdan (Romania) A Dulgheru	6	0^{r}
WC	(Switzerland) S Bandecchi (Switzerland) S Waltert	3	0
(Russia) V Ivakhnenko (Czech Republic) J Malečková	6	6
WC	(France) C Monnet (United States) G Price	2	4
4	(Poland) K Piter (Netherlands) A Rus
(New Zealand) E Routliffe (Belgium) K Zimmermann	w/o
(Russia) A Panova (Germany) J Wachaczyk	w/o
(United States) F Di Lorenzo (Australia) A Sharma
(Indonesia) B Gumulya (Chinese Taipei) Y-c Hsieh	3	1
(Russia) A Fomina (Russia) M Melnikova	6	6
(Luxembourg) M Minella (Switzerland) S Vögele	6^{3}	0^{r}
3	(Japan) E Hozumi (China) S Zhang	7^{7}	0
(Norway) U Eikeri (Greece) V Grammatikopoulou	6	6
(France) E Lechemia (United States) I Neel	4	0
(United States) Q Gleason (Indonesia) J Rompies	w/o
2	(Switzerland) J Teichmann (Slovenia) T Zidanšek

Quarterfinals
WC	(Switzerland) S Bandecchi (Switzerland) S Waltert	7^{7}	6
(Russia) V Ivakhnenko (Czech Republic) J Malečková	6^{4}	3
(New Zealand) E Routliffe (Belgium) K Zimmermann	6	4	[10]
(Russia) A Panova (Germany) J Wachaczyk	2	6	[6]
(Russia) A Fomina (Russia) M Melnikova	3	4
3	(Japan) E Hozumi (China) S Zhang	6	6
(Norway) U Eikeri (Greece) V Grammatikopoulou	6	4	[10]
(United States) Q Gleason (Indonesia) J Rompies	3	6	[6]

Semifinals
WC	(Switzerland) S Bandecchi (Switzerland) S Waltert	7^{7}	6
(New Zealand) E Routliffe (Belgium) K Zimmermann	6^{4}	3
3	(Japan) E Hozumi (China) S Zhang	6^{3}	2
(Norway) U Eikeri (Greece) V Grammatikopoulou	7^{7}	6

Final
WC	(Switzerland) S Bandecchi (Switzerland) S Waltert	6	6^{3}	[10]
(Norway) U Eikeri (Greece) V Grammatikopoulou	3	7^{7}	[5]
