= 2021 Ladies Open Lausanne =

- Date: 12–18 July
- Edition: 28th
- Category: WTA 250
- Draw: 32S / 16D
- Prize money: $235,238
- Surface: Clay / outdoor
- Location: Lausanne, Switzerland
- Venue: Tennis Club Stade-Lausanne

Champions

Singles
- (Slovenia) Tamara Zidanšek

Doubles
- (Switzerland) Susan Bandecchi / (Switzerland) Simona Waltert
- WTA Swiss Open

The 2021 Ladies Open Lausanne was a women's tennis tournament played on outdoor clay courts. It was the 28th edition of the Ladies Open Lausanne, and part of the 250 category of the 2021 WTA Tour. It took place at Tennis Club Stade-Lausanne in Lausanne, Switzerland, from 12 through 18 July 2021.

== Finals ==
=== Singles ===
- (Slovenia) Tamara Zidanšek defeated (France) Clara Burel, 4–6, 7–6^{(7–5)}, 6–1

This was Zidanšek's maiden WTA Tour singles title.

=== Doubles ===
- (Switzerland) Susan Bandecchi / (Switzerland) Simona Waltert defeated (Norway) Ulrikke Eikeri / (Greece) Valentini Grammatikopoulou, 6–3, 6–7^{(3–7)}, [10–5]

== Singles main draw entrants ==
=== Seeds ===
Country	Player	Rank^{1}	Seed
SLO	Tamara Zidanšek	47	1
FRA	Fiona Ferro	51	2
SUI	Jil Teichmann	55	3
ITA	Camila Giorgi	62	4
FRA	Caroline Garcia	76	5
NED	Arantxa Rus	84	6
ITA	Jasmine Paolini	88	7
RUS	Anna Blinkova	89	8

- ^{1} Rankings are as of 28 June 2021.

=== Other entrants ===
The following players received wildcards into the main draw:

- (United States) Alycia Parks
- (Switzerland) Tess Sugnaux
- (Switzerland) Simona Waltert

The following player received entry using a protected ranking:

- (Romania) Alexandra Dulgheru
- (Luxembourg) Mandy Minella

The following players received entry from the qualifying draw:

- (Italy) Lucia Bronzetti
- (Norway) Ulrikke Eikeri
- (Greece) Valentini Grammatikopoulou
- (Australia) Astra Sharma

=== Withdrawals ===
Before the tournament

- (Romania) Sorana Cîrstea → replaced by (Belgium) Maryna Zanevska
- (France) Alizé Cornet → replaced by (United States) Francesca Di Lorenzo
- (Poland) Katarzyna Kawa → replaced by (Romania) Alexandra Dulgheru
- (Russia) Liudmila Samsonova → replaced by (France) Clara Burel
- (United States) Sloane Stephens → replaced by (Luxembourg) Mandy Minella
- (Italy) Martina Trevisan → replaced by (Russia) Marina Melnikova

== Doubles main draw entrants ==
=== Seeds ===
Country	Player	Country	Player	Rank^{1}	Seed
~~RUS~~	~~Anna Blinkova~~	~~GER~~	~~Anna-Lena Friedsam~~	~~116~~	~~1~~
SUI	Jil Teichmann	SLO	Tamara Zidanšek	170	2
JPN	Eri Hozumi	CHN	Zhang Shuai	180	3
POL	Katarzyna Piter	NED	Arantxa Rus	200	4

- ^{1} Rankings are as of 28 June 2021.

=== Other entrants ===
The following pairs received wildcards into the doubles main draw:

- (Switzerland) Susan Bandecchi / (Switzerland) Simona Waltert
- (France) Carole Monnet / (United States) Gabriella Price

The following pair received entry as alternates:

- (Romania) Elena Bogdan / (Romania) Alexandra Dulgheru

=== Withdrawals ===
Before the tournament

- (Uzbekistan) Akgul Amanmuradova / (Russia) Valentina Ivakhnenko → replaced by (Russia) Valentina Ivakhnenko / (Czech Republic) Jesika Malečková
- (Russia) Anna Blinkova / (Germany) Anna-Lena Friedsam → replaced by (Romania) Elena Bogdan / (Romania) Alexandra Dulgheru
- (Germany) Vivian Heisen / (Georgia (country)) Oksana Kalashnikova → replaced by (Luxembourg) Mandy Minella / (Switzerland) Stefanie Vögele

During the tournament

- (Poland) Katarzyna Piter / (Netherlands) Arantxa Rus
- (Switzerland) Jil Teichmann / (Slovenia) Tamara Zidanšek
- (United States) Francesca Di Lorenzo / (Australia) Astra Sharma
