= 2021 Ladies Open Lausanne – Singles =

Tennis tournament

Singles
- 2021 Ladies Open Lausanne

Final
- Champion: (Slovenia) Tamara Zidanšek
- Runner-up: (France) Clara Burel
- Score: 4–6, 7–6^{(7–5)}, 6–1

Events
Singles	Doubles
← 2019 ·	WTA Swiss Open	· 2022 →

Fiona Ferro was the defending champion from 2019, when the event was last held, but lost to Clara Burel in the quarterfinals.

Tamara Zidanšek won her maiden WTA Tour singles title, defeating Burel in the final, 4–6, 7–6^{(7–5)}, 6–1.

== Seeds ==
1. (Slovenia) Tamara Zidanšek (champion)
2. (France) Fiona Ferro (quarterfinals)
3. (Switzerland) Jil Teichmann (first round)
4. (Italy) Camila Giorgi (second round)
5. (France) Caroline Garcia (semifinals)
6. (Netherlands) Arantxa Rus (first round)
7. (Italy) Jasmine Paolini (second round)
8. (Russia) Anna Blinkova (second round)

== Draw ==
=== Key ===
- Q = Qualifier
- WC = Wild card
- LL = Lucky loser
- Alt = Alternate
- SE = Special exempt
- PR = Protected ranking
- ITF = ITF entry
- JE = Junior exempt
- w/o = Walkover
- r = Retired
- d = Defaulted
- SR = Special ranking

=== Finals ===
Semifinals
1	(Slovenia) Tamara Zidanšek	7	6
(Belgium) Maryna Zanevska	5	3
5	(France) Caroline Garcia	7	2	2
(France) Clara Burel	5	6	6

Final
1	(Slovenia) Tamara Zidanšek	4	7^{7}	6
(France) Clara Burel	6	6^{5}	1

=== Top half ===
First round
1	(Slovenia) T Zidanšek	2	6	6
(Russia) M Melnikova	6	3	2
(Russia) V Gracheva	3	2
PR	(Luxembourg) M Minella	6	6
Q	(Italy) L Bronzetti	6	6
WC	(Switzerland) T Sugnaux	1	0
(Belarus) O Govortsova	6	4	2
8	(Russia) A Blinkova	2	6	6
3	(Switzerland) J Teichmann	3	6	2
(Belgium) M Zanevska	6	2	6
(United States) F Di Lorenzo	6	2	2
(Switzerland) S Vögele	3	6	6
(Ukraine) K Zavatska	6	4	0
(Russia) N Vikhlyantseva	4	6	6
Q	(Greece) V Grammatikopoulou	3	6	5
7	(Italy) J Paolini	6	4	7

Second round
1	(Slovenia) T Zidanšek	6	7
PR	(Luxembourg) M Minella	2	5
Q	(Italy) L Bronzetti	6	6
8	(Russia) A Blinkova	1	2
(Belgium) M Zanevska	7	6
(Switzerland) S Vögele	5	3
(Russia) N Vikhlyantseva	6	6
7	(Italy) J Paolini	1	3

Quarterfinals
1	(Slovenia) T Zidanšek	6	4	6
Q	(Italy) L Bronzetti	4	6	3
(Belgium) M Zanevska	7	6
(Russia) N Vikhlyantseva	5	4

Semifinals
1	(Slovenia) T Zidanšek	7	6
(Belgium) M Zanevska	5	3

=== Bottom half ===
First round
5	(France) C Garcia	6	6
PR	(Romania) A Dulgheru	2	2
(Czech Republic) Kr Plíšková	6	6^{4}	1
Q	(Australia) A Sharma	2	7^{7}	6
(Kazakhstan) Z Diyas	6	6
WC	(Switzerland) S Waltert	4	4
Q	(Norway) U Eikeri	2	0
4	(Italy) C Giorgi	6	6
6	(Netherlands) A Rus	6^{6}	7	5
(Russia) K Rakhimova	7^{8}	5	7
(Switzerland) S Bandecchi	0	2
(France) C Burel	6	6
(Germany) A-L Friedsam	3	6	4
WC	(United States) A Parks	6	3	6
(France) H Tan	5	2
2	(France) F Ferro	7	6

Second round
5	(France) C Garcia	7^{7}	3	6
Q	(Australia) A Sharma	6^{3}	6	3
(Kazakhstan) Z Diyas	6	6
4	(Italy) C Giorgi	4	4
(Russia) K Rakhimova	6	3	3
(France) C Burel	1	6	6
WC	(United States) A Parks	4	6	0
2	(France) F Ferro	6	1	6

Quarterfinals
5	(France) C Garcia	7	6
(Kazakhstan) Z Diyas	5	2
(France) C Burel	7	6
2	(France) F Ferro	5	2

Semifinals
5	(France) C Garcia	7	2	2
(France) C Burel	5	6	6

== Qualifying ==
=== Seeds ===
1. (Australia) Astra Sharma (qualified)
2. (Italy) Lucia Bronzetti (qualified)
3. (Norway) Ulrikke Eikeri (qualified)
4. (Greece) Valentini Grammatikopoulou (qualified)

=== Qualifiers ===
1. (Australia) Astra Sharma
2. (Italy) Lucia Bronzetti
3. (Norway) Ulrikke Eikeri
4. (Greece) Valentini Grammatikopoulou

=== Draw ===
==== First qualifier ====
Qualifying competition
1	(Australia) Astra Sharma	5	6	6
	(Russia) Valentina Ivakhnenko	7	2	1

==== Second qualifier ====
Qualifying competition
2	(Italy) Lucia Bronzetti	3	6	6
WC	(Switzerland) Ylena In-Albon	6	3	3

==== Third qualifier ====
Qualifying competition
3	(Norway) Ulrikke Eikeri	6	6
WC	(United States) Gabriella Price	1	1

==== Fourth qualifier ====
Qualifying competition
4	(Greece) Valentini Grammatikopoulou	6	6^{1}	6
	(Czech Republic) Jesika Malečková	3	7^{7}	2
