= Gabriella Price =

American tennis player

- Country (sports): United States
- Born: 11 June 2003 (age 22)
- Plays: Right-handed
- Prize money: $49,033

Singles
- Career record: 56–75
- Career titles: 0
- Highest ranking: No. 654 (4 October 2021)

Grand Slam singles results
- US Open: Q1 (2021)

Doubles
- Career record: 16–22
- Career titles: 0
- Highest ranking: No. 601 (16 October 2023)
- Last updated on: 3 June 2026.

Gabriella Price (born 11 June 2003) is an American tennis player.

Price has career-high WTA rankings of 654 in singles, achieved on 4 October 2021, and 601 in doubles, set on 16 October 2023.

Price made her WTA main draw debut at the 2021 Ladies Open Lausanne, where she received a wildcard to the doubles main draw.

== ITF Circuit finals ==
=== Doubles: 1 (runner-up) ===
Legend W25/35 tournaments	Finals by surface Clay (0–1)

Result	W–L	Date	Tournament	Tier	Surface	Partner	Opponents	Score
Loss	0–1	Aug 2024	ITF Arequipa, Peru	W35	Clay	(Spain) Alicia Herrero Liñana	(Peru) Dana Guzmán (France) Tiantsoa Sarah Rakotomanga Rajaonah	6–3, 4–6, [6–10]
