= 2021 Bad Homburg Open =

- Date: 20–26 June
- Edition: 1st
- Category: WTA 250
- Draw: 32S / 16D
- Prize money: $235,238
- Surface: Grass
- Location: Bad Homburg, Germany
- Venue: TC Bad Homburg

Champions

Singles
- (Germany) Angelique Kerber

Doubles
- (Croatia) Darija Jurak / (Slovenia) Andreja Klepač
Bad Homburg Open	· 2022 →

The 2021 Bad Homburg Open was a women's tennis tournament played on outdoor grass courts. It was the inaugural edition of the Bad Homburg Open, and part of the WTA 250 series of the 2021 WTA Tour. The event took place at the TC Bad Homburg in Bad Homburg, Germany, from 20 until 26 June 2021.

Bad Homburg is historically significant in the development and popularity of tennis in Europe.

== Finals ==
=== Singles ===
- (Germany) Angelique Kerber def. (Czech Republic) Kateřina Siniaková, 6–3, 6–2.

=== Doubles ===
- (Croatia) Darija Jurak / (Slovenia) Andreja Klepač def. (Ukraine) Nadiia Kichenok / (Romania) Raluca Olaru, 6–3, 6–1.

== WTA singles main-draw entrants ==
=== Seeds ===
Country	Player	Rank^{1}	Seed
CZE	Petra Kvitová	11	1
BLR	Victoria Azarenka	16	2
USA	Jessica Pegula	26	3
GER	Angelique Kerber	27	4
ARG	Nadia Podoroska	42	5
ROU	Sorana Cîrstea	45	6
ESP	Sara Sorribes Tormo	53	7
GER	Laura Siegemund	55	8

- ^{1} Rankings are as of June 14, 2021.

=== Other entrants ===
The following players received wildcards into the main draw:

- (Belarus) Victoria Azarenka
- (Germany) Mona Barthel
- (Germany) Mara Guth

The following players received entry from the qualifying draw:

- (Belarus) Yuliya Hatouka
- (Poland) Katarzyna Piter
- (Russia) Ekaterina Yashina
- (Germany) Anna Zaja

The following player received entry as a lucky loser:

- (India) Riya Bhatia

=== Withdrawals ===
Before the tournament

- (Romania) Irina-Camelia Begu → replaced by (Germany) Andrea Petkovic
- (United States) Jennifer Brady → replaced by (Russia) Varvara Gracheva
- (France) Caroline Garcia → replaced by (Japan) Misaki Doi
- (Czech Republic) Barbora Krejčíková → replaced by (Germany) Tamara Korpatsch
- (Greece) Maria Sakkari → replaced by (Denmark) Clara Tauson
- (United States) Sloane Stephens → replaced by (India) Riya Bhatia
- (Switzerland) Jil Teichmann → replaced by (Netherlands) Arantxa Rus
- (Belgium) Alison Van Uytvanck → replaced by (Italy) Martina Trevisan

During the tournament

- (Belarus) Victoria Azarenka (back injury)

== WTA doubles main-draw entrants ==
=== Seeds ===
Country	Player	Country	Player	Rank^{1}	Seed
CRO	Darija Jurak	SLO	Andreja Klepač	57	1
UKR	Nadiia Kichenok	ROU	Raluca Olaru	85	2
RUS	Anna Blinkova	NED	Arantxa Rus	126	3
GER	Vivian Heisen	CZE	Květa Peschke	138	4

- ^{1} Rankings are as of June 14, 2021.

=== Other entrants ===
The following pairs received wildcards into the doubles main draw:

- (Germany) Mara Guth / (Germany) Julia Middendorf

=== Withdrawals ===
- (United States) Amanda Anisimova / (United States) Sloane Stephens (Stephens – right foot injury)
