= 2024 Bad Homburg Open – Doubles =

Doubles
- 2024 Bad Homburg Open

Final
- Champions: (United States) Nicole Melichar-Martinez (Australia) Ellen Perez
- Runners-up: (Chinese Taipei) Chan Hao-ching; Veronika Kudermetova
- Score: 4–6, 6–3, [10–8]

Events
Singles	Doubles
← 2023 ·	Bad Homburg Open	· 2025 →

Nicole Melichar-Martinez and Ellen Perez won the doubles title at the 2024 Bad Homburg Open, defeating Chan Hao-ching and Veronika Kudermetova in the final, 4–6, 6–3, [10–8].

Lidziya Marozava and Ingrid Martins were the reigning champions, but Marozava did not participate this year. Martins partnered Irina Khromacheva, but lost in the first round to Anna Danilina and Xu Yifan.

== Seeds ==
1. (United States) Nicole Melichar-Martinez / (Australia) Ellen Perez (champions)
2. (Czech Republic) Kateřina Siniaková / (United States) Taylor Townsend (first round)
3. (Mexico) Giuliana Olmos / Alexandra Panova (first round)
4. (Japan) Eri Hozumi / (Spain) Sara Sorribes Tormo (first round)

== Draw ==
=== Key ===
- Q = Qualifier
- WC = Wild card
- LL = Lucky loser
- Alt = Alternate
- SE = Special exempt
- PR = Protected ranking
- ITF = ITF entry
- JE = Junior exempt
- w/o = Walkover
- r = Retired
- d = Defaulted
- SR = Special ranking

=== Draw ===
First round
1	(United States) N Melichar-Martinez (Australia) E Perez	6	6
(Netherlands) A Rus (Chinese Taipei) F-h Wu	3	4
(Japan) M Kato (China) S Zhang	6	7^{7}
WC	(Germany) V Heisen (Germany) T Korpatsch	3	6^{5}
3	(Mexico) G Olmos; A Panova	7^{7}	3	[4]
(Georgia (country)) O Kalashnikova; Y Sizikova	6^{3}	6	[10]
WC	D Shnaider; E Vesnina	4	4
(Norway) U Eikeri (Estonia) I Neel	6	6
A Blinkova (Slovakia) T Mihalíková	2	4
(Japan) S Aoyama (Serbia) A Krunić	6	6
(Chinese Taipei) H-c Chan; V Kudermetova	6	6
4	(Japan) E Hozumi (Spain) S Sorribes Tormo	3	1
I Khromacheva (Brazil) I Martins	4	5
(Kazakhstan) A Danilina (China) Y Xu	6	7
(United Kingdom) O Nicholls (France) D Parry	2	6	[10]
2	(Czech Republic) K Siniaková (United States) T Townsend	6	3	[8]

Quarterfinals
1	(United States) N Melichar-Martinez (Australia) E Perez	6	6
(Japan) M Kato (China) S Zhang	3	4
(Georgia (country)) O Kalashnikova; Y Sizikova	4	6	[5]
(Norway) U Eikeri (Estonia) I Neel	6	3	[10]
(Japan) S Aoyama (Serbia) A Krunić	0	3
(Chinese Taipei) H-c Chan; V Kudermetova	6	6
(Kazakhstan) A Danilina (China) Y Xu	7^{7}	7
(United Kingdom) O Nicholls (France) D Parry	6^{4}	5

Semifinals
1	(United States) N Melichar-Martinez (Australia) E Perez	6	6
(Norway) U Eikeri (Estonia) I Neel	3	4
(Chinese Taipei) H-c Chan; V Kudermetova	6	6
(Kazakhstan) A Danilina (China) Y Xu	3	2

Final
1	(United States) N Melichar-Martinez (Australia) E Perez	4	6	[10]
(Chinese Taipei) H-c Chan; V Kudermetova	6	3	[8]
