= 2024 Bad Homburg Open =

- Date: 23–29 June
- Edition: 4th
- Category: WTA 500
- Draw: 32S / 16D
- Prize money: €802,237
- Surface: Grass
- Location: Bad Homburg, Germany
- Venue: TC Bad Homburg

Champions

Singles
- Diana Shnaider

Doubles
- (United States) Nicole Melichar-Martinez / (Australia) Ellen Perez
- Bad Homburg Open

The 2024 Bad Homburg Open powered by Solarwatt was a women's professional tennis tournament played on outdoor grass courts at the TC Bad Homburg in Bad Homburg, Germany, from 23 to 29 June 2024. It was the fourth edition of the Bad Homburg Open and was classified as a WTA 500 event on the 2024 WTA Tour (upgraded from WTA 250 status in previous years).

== Champions ==
=== Singles ===
- Diana Shnaider def. (Croatia) Donna Vekić, 6–3, 2–6, 6–3

=== Doubles ===
- (United States) Nicole Melichar-Martinez / (Australia) Ellen Perez def. (Chinese Taipei) Chan Hao-ching / Veronika Kudermetova 4–6, 6–3, [10–8]

== Singles main-draw entrants ==
=== Seeds ===
Country	Player	Rank^{1}	Seed
GRE	Maria Sakkari	9	1
	Liudmila Samsonova	15	2
USA	Emma Navarro	17	3
BRA	Beatriz Haddad Maia	18	4
	~~Victoria Azarenka~~	~~19~~	~~5~~
	Ekaterina Alexandrova	20	6
UKR	Elina Svitolina	21	7
	Mirra Andreeva	23	8
	~~Anna Kalinskaya~~	~~24~~	~~9~~

- ^{1} Rankings are as of 17 June 2024.

=== Other entrants ===
The following players received wildcards into the main draw:

- (Canada) Bianca Andreescu
- (Spain) Paula Badosa
- (Germany) Tatjana Maria
- (Denmark) Caroline Wozniacki

The following player received entry using a protected ranking:

- (Germany) Angelique Kerber

The following players received entry from the qualifying draw:

- (Italy) Lucia Bronzetti
- (Romania) Jaqueline Cristian
- (France) Diane Parry
- (Bulgaria) Viktoriya Tomova

The following players received entry as lucky losers:

- (Germany) Tamara Korpatsch
- (Germany) Jule Niemeier
- (Germany) Julia Stusek
- (United States) Taylor Townsend

=== Withdrawals ===
- Victoria Azarenka → replaced by (Germany) Tamara Korpatsch
- (Italy) Elisabetta Cocciaretto → replaced by (Germany) Jule Niemeier
- (France) Caroline Garcia → replaced by (United States) Peyton Stearns
- Anna Kalinskaya → replaced by (United States) Taylor Townsend
- (Kazakhstan) Yulia Putintseva → replaced by (Germany) Julia Stusek
- (Czech Republic) Markéta Vondroušová → replaced by (Argentina) Nadia Podoroska

== Doubles main-draw entrants ==
=== Seeds ===
Country	Player	Country	Player	Rank^{1}	Seed
USA	Nicole Melichar-Martinez	AUS	Ellen Perez	18	1
CZE	Kateřina Siniaková	USA	Taylor Townsend	29	2
MEX	Giuliana Olmos		Alexandra Panova	65	3
JPN	Eri Hozumi	ESP	Sara Sorribes Tormo	69	4

- ^{1} Rankings are as of 17 June 2024.

=== Other entrants ===
The following pairs received wildcards into the doubles main draw:

- (Germany) Vivian Heisen / (Germany) Tamara Korpatsch
- Diana Shnaider / Elena Vesnina
