= 2026 Bad Homburg Open – Singles =

Singles
- 2026 Bad Homburg Open

Final
- Champion: (Czech Republic) Karolína Muchová
- Runner-up: (Japan) Naomi Osaka
- Score: 6−1, 1−0 ret.

Details
- Draw: 28 (4 Q / 4 WC)
- Seeds: 8

Events
Singles	Doubles
- Bad Homburg Open

Karolína Muchová won the singles tennis title at the 2026 Bad Homburg Open after Naomi Osaka retired in the final due to a foot injury, with the score at 6–1, 1–0. It was her third WTA Tour title, and first on grass courts.

Jessica Pegula was the reigning champion, but did not participate this year.

At 3 hours and 12 minutes, the first-round match between Leylah Fernandez and Katie Boulter was the longest match in tournament history.

== Seeds ==
The top four seeds received a bye into the second round.

1. (Poland) Iga Świątek (second round)
2. Mirra Andreeva (second round)
3. (Ukraine) Elina Svitolina (quarterfinals, withdrew)
4. (Czech Republic) Karolína Muchová (champion)
5. (Czech Republic) Linda Nosková (first round)
6. (Japan) Naomi Osaka (final, retired)
7. Diana Shnaider (first round)
8. (United States) Iva Jovic (withdrew)

== Draw ==
Key

- Q = Qualifier
- WC = Wild card
- LL = Lucky loser
- Alt = Alternate
- ITF = ITF entry
- PR = Protected ranking
- SR = Special ranking
- SE = Special exempt
- JE = Junior exempt
- JR = Junior Accelerator Programme entrant
- CO = College Accelerator Programme entrant
- NG = Next Gen Accelerator Program entrant
- w/o = Walkover
- r = Retired
- d = Defaulted

=== Finals ===
Semifinals
Q	(Romania) Elena-Gabriela Ruse	4	4
4	(Czech Republic) Karolína Muchová	6	6
(China) Wang Xinyu	3	3
6	(Japan) Naomi Osaka	6	6

Final
4	(Czech Republic) Karolína Muchová	6	1
6	(Japan) Naomi Osaka	1	0^{r}

=== Top half ===
First round
WC	(Germany) E Lys	6^{6}	3
(United States) E Navarro	7^{8}	6
Q	(Austria) S Kraus	4	1
A Kalinskaya	6	6
Q	(Romania) E-G Ruse	6	6
5	(Czech Republic) L Nosková	1	3
WC	(United States) V Williams	2	6	6^{6}
Q	(Romania) I-C Begu	6	4	7^{8}
Q	(Argentina) S Sierra	5	6	4
WC	(China) Q Zheng	7	4	6
(Denmark) C Tauson	6	6
7	D Shnaider	4	4

Second round
1	(Poland) I Świątek	5	6	3
(United States) E Navarro	7	2	6
A Kalinskaya	5	2
Q	(Romania) E-G Ruse	7	6
4	(Czech Republic) K Muchová	6	6
Q	(Romania) I-C Begu	1	1
WC	(China) Q Zheng	7	4	2
(Denmark) C Tauson	5	6	6

Quarterfinals
(United States) E Navarro	4	2
Q	(Romania) E-G Ruse	6	6
4	(Czech Republic) K Muchová	1	6	6
(Denmark) C Tauson	6	2	4

Semifinals
Q	(Romania) E-G Ruse	4	4
4	(Czech Republic) K Muchová	6	6

=== Bottom half ===
First round
LL	(Mexico) R Zarazua	1	2
(China) Xin Wang	6	6
WC	(United Kingdom) K Boulter	7^{7}	3	3
(Canada) L Fernandez	6^{5}	6	6
L Samsonova	6	7
(Czech Republic) K Siniaková	3	5
6	(Japan) N Osaka	6	6
(Poland) M Fręch	4	1
(Philippines) A Eala	3	3
(Belgium) E Mertens	6	6
(United States) A Li	1	7^{7}	1
E Alexandrova	6	6^{5}	6

Second round
(China) Xin Wang	6	6
(Canada) L Fernandez	3	4
L Samsonova	6	3	2
3	(Ukraine) E Svitolina	3	6	6
6	(Japan) N Osaka	6	6
(Belgium) E Mertens	3	3
E Alexandrova	6	6
2	M Andreeva	3	4

Quarterfinals
(China) Xin Wang	w/o
3	(Ukraine) E Svitolina
6	(Japan) N Osaka	6	6
E Alexandrova	2	2

Semifinals
(China) Xin Wang	3	3
6	(Japan) N Osaka	6	6

== Qualifying ==
=== Seeds ===
1. (Argentina) Solana Sierra (qualified)
2. (France) Diane Parry (qualifying competition)
3. (China) Zhang Shuai (first round)
4. (Mexico) Renata Zarazúa (qualifying competition, lucky loser)
5. (Germany) Tamara Korpatsch (first round)
6. (United States) Taylor Townsend (qualifying competition)
7. (Kazakhstan) Yulia Putintseva (withdrew)
8. (Austria) Sinja Kraus (qualified)

=== Qualifiers ===
1. (Argentina) Solana Sierra
2. (Romania) Irina-Camelia Begu
3. (Romania) Elena-Gabriela Ruse
4. (Austria) Sinja Kraus

=== Lucky losers ===
1. (Mexico) Renata Zarazúa

=== Qualifying draw ===
==== First qualifier ====
First round
1	(Argentina) Solana Sierra	6	6
(Germany) Ella Seidel	2	1
Anna Blinkova	7^{7}	6
Alt	Julia Avdeeva	6^{4}	2

Qualifying competition
1	(Argentina) Solana Sierra	3	7	6
Anna Blinkova	6	5	4

==== Second qualifier ====
First round
2	(France) Diane Parry	6	6
PR	(Japan) Aoi Ito	2	1
PR	(Romania) Irina-Camelia Begu	6	6
5	(Germany) Tamara Korpatsch	1	4

Qualifying competition
2	(France) Diane Parry	4	6^{5}
PR	(Romania) Irina-Camelia Begu	6	7^{7}

==== Third qualifier ====
First round
3	(China) Zhang Shuai	5	4
(Romania) Elena-Gabriela Ruse	7	6
PR	(Italy) Martina Trevisan	4	2
6	(United States) Taylor Townsend	6	6

Qualifying competition
(Romania) Elena-Gabriela Ruse	3	6	6
6	(United States) Taylor Townsend	6	1	4

==== Fourth qualifier ====
First round
4	(Mexico) Renata Zarazúa	6	7^{7}
WC	(Germany) Mariella Thamm	3	6^{4}
Alt	(Czech Republic) Tereza Martincová	4	3
8	(Austria) Sinja Kraus	6	6

Qualifying competition
4	(Mexico) Renata Zarazúa	2	5
8	(Austria) Sinja Kraus	6	7
