= 2022 Bad Homburg Open =

- Date: 19–25 June
- Edition: 2nd
- Category: WTA 250
- Draw: 32S / 16D
- Prize money: $251,750
- Surface: Grass
- Location: Bad Homburg, Germany
- Venue: TC Bad Homburg

Champions

Singles
- (France) Caroline Garcia

Doubles
- (Japan) Eri Hozumi / (Japan) Makoto Ninomiya
- Bad Homburg Open

The 2022 Bad Homburg Open was a women's professional tennis tournament played on outdoor grass courts at the TC Bad Homburg in Bad Homburg, Germany, from 19 June to 25 June 2022. It was the second edition of the Bad Homburg Open and was classified as a WTA 250 event on the 2022 WTA Tour.

== Champions ==
=== Singles ===
- (France) Caroline Garcia def. (Canada) Bianca Andreescu 6–7^{(5–7)}, 6–4, 6–4

This is Garcia's first singles title of the year and eighth of her career.

=== Doubles ===
- (Japan) Eri Hozumi / (Japan) Makoto Ninomiya def. (Poland) Alicja Rosolska / (New Zealand) Erin Routliffe 6–4, 6–7^{(5–7)}, [10–5]

== Point distribution ==
Event	W	F	SF	QF	Round of 16	Round of 32	Q	Q2	Q1
Women's singles	280	180	110	60	30	1	18	12	1
Women's doubles	280	180	110	60	1	—N/a	—N/a	—N/a	—N/a

== WTA singles main-draw entrants ==
=== Seeds ===
Country	Player	Rank^{1}	Seed
	Daria Kasatkina	12	1
~~SUI~~	~~Belinda Bencic~~	~~17~~	~~2~~
GER	Angelique Kerber	18	3
ROU	Simona Halep	20	4
	~~Veronika Kudermetova~~	~~24~~	~~5~~
USA	Amanda Anisimova	25	6
ITA	Martina Trevisan	28	7
	Liudmila Samsonova	29	8
FRA	Alizé Cornet	34	9

- ^{1} Rankings are as of 13 June 2022.

=== Other entrants ===
The following players received wildcards into the main draw:

- (Germany) Sabine Lisicki
- (Germany) Tatjana Maria
- (Germany) Jule Niemeier

The following players received entry from the qualifying draw:

- Anastasia Gasanova
- Yuliya Hatouka
- Kamilla Rakhimova
- (United Kingdom) Katie Swan

The following players received entry as lucky losers:

- (Japan) Misaki Doi
- (Germany) Tamara Korpatsch

=== Withdrawals ===
Before the tournament

- Ekaterina Alexandrova → replaced by (France) Caroline Garcia
- Victoria Azarenka → replaced by (United States) Claire Liu
- (Switzerland) Belinda Bencic → replaced by (Germany) Tamara Korpatsch
- Veronika Kudermetova → replaced by (Japan) Misaki Doi
- Aryna Sabalenka → replaced by (Belgium) Greet Minnen

== WTA doubles main-draw entrants ==
=== Seeds ===
Country	Player	Country	Player	Rank^{1}	Seed
JPN	Eri Hozumi	JPN	Makoto Ninomiya	79	1
POL	Alicja Rosolska	NZL	Erin Routliffe	80	2
UKR	Nadiia Kichenok	ROU	Raluca Olaru	102	3
USA	Kaitlyn Christian		Lidziya Marozava	116	4

- ^{1} Rankings are as of 13 June 2022.

=== Other entrants ===
The following pair received a wildcard into the doubles main draw:

- (United States) Sloane Stephens / (United Kingdom) Katie Swan

The following pair received entry as alternates:

- Alena Fomina-Klotz / Anastasia Gasanova

=== Withdrawals ===
- Natela Dzalamidze / Kamilla Rakhimova → replaced by (Germany) Julia Lohoff / Kamilla Rakhimova
- (China) Han Xinyun / Alexandra Panova → replaced by (China) Han Xinyun / (Czech Republic) Renata Voráčová
- (Netherlands) Rosalie van der Hoek / (Belgium) Alison Van Uytvanck → replaced by Alena Fomina-Klotz / Anastasia Gasanova
