= 2023 Bad Homburg Open – Singles =

Singles
- 2023 Bad Homburg Open

Final
- Champion: (Czech Republic) Kateřina Siniaková
- Runner-up: (Italy) Lucia Bronzetti
- Score: 6–2, 7–6^{(7–5)}

Details
- Draw: 32 (4 Q / 3 WC )
- Seeds: 8

Events
Singles	Doubles
← 2022 ·	Bad Homburg Open	· 2024 →

Kateřina Siniaková defeated Lucia Bronzetti in the final, 6–2, 7–6^{(7–5)} to win the singles tennis title at the 2023 Bad Homburg Open. It was her fourth WTA Tour singles title and first on grass courts, having now won titles on all three surfaces.

Caroline Garcia was the defending champion, but chose to compete in Eastbourne instead.

== Seeds ==
1. (Poland) Iga Świątek (semifinals, withdrew)
2. Liudmila Samsonova (quarterfinals)
3. (Croatia) Donna Vekić (withdrew)
4. (Egypt) Mayar Sherif (second round)
5. (Canada) Bianca Andreescu (second round)
6. (China) Zhu Lin (withdrew)
7. (Italy) Elisabetta Cocciaretto (first round)
8. (France) Varvara Gracheva (quarterfinals)
9. Anna Blinkova (quarterfinals)

== Draw ==
=== Key ===
- Q = Qualifier
- WC = Wild card
- LL = Lucky loser
- Alt = Alternate
- ITF = ITF entry
- PR = Protected ranking
- SR = Special ranking
- SE = Special exempt
- JE = Junior exempt
- JR = Junior Accelerator Programme entrant
- CO = College Accelerator Programme entrant
- NG = Next Gen Accelerator Program entrant
- w/o = Walkover
- r = Retired
- d = Defaulted

=== Finals ===
Semifinals
1	(Poland) Iga Świątek
(Italy) Lucia Bronzetti	w/o
Alt	(United States) Emma Navarro	2	2
(Czech Republic) Kateřina Siniaková	6	6

Final
(Italy) Lucia Bronzetti	2	6^{5}
(Czech Republic) Kateřina Siniaková	6	7^{7}

=== Top half ===
First round
1	(Poland) I Świątek	5	6	6
(Germany) T Maria	7	2	0
Q	(Switzerland) J Teichmann	3	6	6
Q	(United States) C Liu	6	3	4
LL	(Germany) L Papadakis	0	1
(Canada) L Fernandez	6	6
WC	(Germany) S Lisicki	6	1	5
9	A Blinkova	3	6	7
4	(Egypt) M Sherif	4	6	7
WC	(Germany) A-L Friedsam	6	4	5
(Italy) L Bronzetti	6	6
(Austria) J Grabher	4	1
Q	(Belgium) M Zanevska	2	3
(Italy) S Errani	6	6
PR	(Romania) J Cristian	2	1
8	(France) V Gracheva	6	6

Second round
1	(Poland) I Świątek	6	6
Q	(Switzerland) J Teichmann	3	1
(Canada) L Fernandez	5	2
9	A Blinkova	7	6
4	(Egypt) M Sherif	6	6^{2}	3
(Italy) L Bronzetti	1	7^{7}	6
(Italy) S Errani	2	5
8	(France) V Gracheva	6	7

Quarterfinals
1	(Poland) I Świątek	6	6
9	A Blinkova	3	2
(Italy) L Bronzetti	6	6
8	(France) V Gracheva	4	3

Semifinals
1	(Poland) I Świątek
(Italy) L Bronzetti	w/o

=== Bottom half ===
First round
5	(Canada) B Andreescu	6	3	7
WC	(United Kingdom) S Kartal	2	6	5
A Sasnovich	3	2
(Spain) R Masarova	6	6
(Italy) M Trevisan	4	2
(France) A Cornet	6	6
Alt	(United States) E Navarro	6	6
LL	(Argentina) N Podoroska	2	0
7	(Italy) E Cocciaretto	3	4
(Czech Republic) K Siniaková	6	6
LL	(United States) K Volynets	0	4
PR	E Rodina	6	6
(Czech Republic) L Nosková	6	7
Q	(Ukraine) K Baindl	2	5
(Bulgaria) V Tomova	1	4
2	L Samsonova	6	6

Second round
5	(Canada) B Andreescu	3	2
(Spain) R Masarova	6	6
(France) A Cornet	5	6^{6}
Alt	(United States) E Navarro	7	7^{8}
(Czech Republic) K Siniaková	6	6
PR	E Rodina	2	4
(Czech Republic) L Nosková	4	7^{7}	3
2	L Samsonova	6	6^{4}	6

Quarterfinals
(Spain) R Masarova	7^{7}	1^{r}
Alt	(United States) E Navarro	6^{2}	1
(Czech Republic) K Siniaková	7	4	6
2	L Samsonova	5	6	2

Semifinals
Alt	(United States) E Navarro	2	2
(Czech Republic) K Siniaková	6	6

== Qualifying ==
=== Seeds ===
1. (Argentina) Nadia Podoroska (qualifying competition, lucky loser)
2. (Ukraine) Kateryna Baindl (qualified)
3. (Belgium) Maryna Zanevska (qualified)
4. (United States) Claire Liu (qualified)

=== Qualifiers ===
1. (Switzerland) Jil Teichmann
2. (Ukraine) Kateryna Baindl
3. (Belgium) Maryna Zanevska
4. (United States) Claire Liu

=== Lucky losers ===
1. (United States) Katie Volynets
2. (Argentina) Nadia Podoroska
3. (Germany) Lena Papadakis

=== Qualifying draw ===
==== First qualifier ====
Qualifying competition
1	(Argentina) Nadia Podoroska	5	3
	(Switzerland) Jil Teichmann	7	6

==== Second qualifier ====
Qualifying competition
2	(Ukraine) Kateryna Baindl	6	0	6
	(United States) Katie Volynets	2	6	4

==== Third qualifier ====
Qualifying competition
3	(Belgium) Maryna Zanevska	7^{7}	3	6
WC	(Germany) Lena Papadakis	6^{5}	6	3

==== Fourth qualifier ====
Qualifying competition
4	(United States) Claire Liu	7^{7}	7^{7}
WC	(Germany) Mara Guth	6^{1}	6^{1}
