= 2021 Bad Homburg Open – Doubles =

Doubles
- 2021 Bad Homburg Open

Final
- Champions: (Croatia) Darija Jurak (Slovenia) Andreja Klepač
- Runners-up: (Ukraine) Nadiia Kichenok (Romania) Raluca Olaru
- Score: 6–3, 6–1

Events
Singles	Doubles
Bad Homburg Open	· 2022 →

Darija Jurak and Andreja Klepač defeated Nadiia Kichenok and Raluca Olaru in the final, 6–3, 6–1, to win the doubles tennis title at the 2021 Bad Homburg Open. It marked Jurak's eighth career WTA Tour doubles title, her second of the season, and Klepač's ninth.

This was the inaugural edition of the tournament.

== Seeds ==
1. (Croatia) Darija Jurak / (Slovenia) Andreja Klepač (champions)
2. (Ukraine) Nadiia Kichenok / (Romania) Raluca Olaru (final)
3. (Russia) Anna Blinkova / (Netherlands) Arantxa Rus (semifinals)
4. (Germany) Vivian Heisen / (Czech Republic) Květa Peschke (semifinals)

== Draw ==
=== Key ===
- Q = Qualifier
- WC = Wild card
- LL = Lucky loser
- Alt = Alternate
- SE = Special exempt
- PR = Protected ranking
- ITF = ITF entry
- JE = Junior exempt
- w/o = Walkover
- r = Retired
- d = Defaulted
- SR = Special ranking

=== Draw ===
First round
1	(Croatia) D Jurak (Slovenia) A Klepač	6	6
(Japan) M Kato (Czech Republic) R Voráčová	4	0
(Kazakhstan) A Danilina (Russia) V Gracheva	6	6
(Germany) T Morderger (Germany) Y Morderger	2	4
3	(Russia) A Blinkova (Netherlands) A Rus	6	6
(Poland) K Piter (Netherlands) R van der Hoek	2	0
(New Zealand) E Routliffe (Belgium) K Zimmermann	7^{7}	6
(Germany) T Korpatsch (Germany) A Zaja	6^{3}	3
(Russia) N Dzalamidze (Poland) P Kania-Choduń	6	6
(Sweden) R Peterson (Spain) S Sorribes Tormo	3	3
(United States) A Anisimova (United States) S Stephens
4	(Germany) V Heisen (Czech Republic) K Peschke	w/o
WC	(Germany) M Guth (Germany) J Middendorf	4	4
(Russia) A Fomina (Russia) E Yashina	6	6
(Georgia (country)) O Kalashnikova (Romania) A Mitu	1	4
2	(Ukraine) N Kichenok (Romania) R Olaru	6	6

Quarterfinals
1	(Croatia) D Jurak (Slovenia) A Klepač	6	6
(Kazakhstan) A Danilina (Russia) V Gracheva	1	3
3	(Russia) A Blinkova (Netherlands) A Rus	3	7^{8}	[11]
(New Zealand) E Routliffe (Belgium) K Zimmermann	6	6^{6}	[9]
(Russia) N Dzalamidze (Poland) P Kania-Choduń	2	2
4	(Germany) V Heisen (Czech Republic) K Peschke	6	6
(Russia) A Fomina (Russia) E Yashina	2	4
2	(Ukraine) N Kichenok (Romania) R Olaru	6	6

Semifinals
1	(Croatia) D Jurak (Slovenia) A Klepač	6	1	[10]
3	(Russia) A Blinkova (Netherlands) A Rus	2	6	[5]
4	(Germany) V Heisen (Czech Republic) K Peschke	4	4
2	(Ukraine) N Kichenok (Romania) R Olaru	6	6

Final
1	(Croatia) D Jurak (Slovenia) A Klepač	6	6
2	(Ukraine) N Kichenok (Romania) R Olaru	3	1
