= 2023 Bad Homburg Open =

- Date: 25 June–2 July
- Edition: 3rd
- Category: WTA 250
- Draw: 32S / 16D
- Prize money: $259,303
- Surface: Grass
- Location: Bad Homburg, Germany
- Venue: TC Bad Homburg

Champions

Singles
- (Czech Republic) Kateřina Siniaková

Doubles
- (Brazil) Ingrid Gamarra Martins / Lidziya Marozava
- Bad Homburg Open

The 2023 Bad Homburg Open presented by Engel & Völkers was a women's professional tennis tournament played on outdoor grass courts at the TC Bad Homburg in Bad Homburg, Germany, from 25 June to 2 July 2023. It was the third edition of the Bad Homburg Open and was classified as a WTA 250 event on the 2023 WTA Tour.

== Champions ==
=== Singles ===
- (Czech Republic) Kateřina Siniaková def. (Italy) Lucia Bronzetti, 6–2, 7–6^{(7–5)}

=== Doubles ===
- (Brazil) Ingrid Gamarra Martins / Lidziya Marozava def. (Japan) Eri Hozumi / (Romania) Monica Niculescu, 6–0, 7–6^{(7–3)}

== Point distribution ==
Event	W	F	SF	QF	Round of 16	Round of 32	Q	Q2	Q1
Women's singles	280	180	110	60	30	1	18	12	1
Women's doubles	280	180	110	60	1	—N/a	—N/a	—N/a	—N/a

== Singles main-draw entrants ==
=== Seeds ===
Country	Player	Rank^{1}	Seed
POL	Iga Świątek	1	1
	Liudmila Samsonova	15	2
~~CRO~~	~~Donna Vekić~~	~~23~~	~~3~~
EGY	Mayar Sherif	31	4
CAN	Bianca Andreescu	35	5
~~CHN~~	~~Zhu Lin~~	~~39~~	~~6~~
ITA	Elisabetta Cocciaretto	41	7
FRA	Varvara Gracheva	43	8
	Anna Blinkova	44	9

- ^{1} Rankings are as of 19 June 2023.

=== Other entrants ===
The following players received wildcards into the main draw:

- (Germany) Anna-Lena Friedsam
- (United Kingdom) Sonay Kartal
- (Germany) Sabine Lisicki

The following players received entry using a protected ranking:

- (Romania) Jaqueline Cristian
- Evgeniya Rodina

The following player received entry as an alternate:

- (United States) Emma Navarro

The following players received entry from the qualifying draw:

- (Ukraine) Kateryna Baindl
- (United States) Claire Liu
- (Switzerland) Jil Teichmann
- (Belgium) Maryna Zanevska

The following players received entry as lucky losers:

- (Germany) Lena Papadakis
- (Argentina) Nadia Podoroska
- (United States) Katie Volynets

=== Withdrawals ===
- Ekaterina Alexandrova → replaced by (Bulgaria) Viktoriya Tomova
- Victoria Azarenka → replaced by Evgeniya Rodina
- Anna Kalinskaya → replaced by (United States) Emma Navarro
- (United States) Alycia Parks → replaced by (Germany) Lena Papadakis
- (United States) Sloane Stephens → replaced by (Spain) Rebeka Masarova
- (Croatia) Donna Vekić → replaced by (Argentina) Nadia Podoroska
- (China) Zhu Lin → replaced by (United States) Katie Volynets

== Doubles main-draw entrants ==
=== Seeds ===
Country	Player	Country	Player	Rank^{1}	Seed
CHI	Alexa Guarachi	NZL	Erin Routliffe	88	1
	Yana Sizikova	BEL	Kimberley Zimmermann	90	2
SVK	Tereza Mihalíková	JPN	Makoto Ninomiya	101	3
UKR	Nadiia Kichenok	POL	Alicja Rosolska	107	4

- ^{1} Rankings are as of 19 June 2023.

=== Other entrants ===
The following pairs received wildcards into the doubles main draw:

- (Italy) Sara Errani / (Argentina) Nadia Podoroska
- (Germany) Anna-Lena Friedsam / (Germany) Vivian Heisen
