= 2026 Bad Homburg Open =

- Date: 21–27 June
- Edition: 6th
- Category: WTA 500
- Draw: 32S / 16D
- Prize money: €1,049,083
- Surface: Grass
- Location: Bad Homburg, Germany
- Venue: TC Bad Homburg

Champions

Singles
- (Czech Republic) Karolína Muchová

Doubles
- (Indonesia) Aldila Sutjiadi / Vera Zvonareva
- Bad Homburg Open

The 2026 Bad Homburg Open powered by Solarwatt was a women's professional tennis tournament played on outdoor grass courts at the TC Bad Homburg in Bad Homburg, Germany, from 21 to 27 June 2026. It was the sixth edition of the Bad Homburg Open and was classified as a WTA 500 event on the 2026 WTA Tour.

== Champions ==
=== Singles ===
- (Czech Republic) Karolína Muchová def. (Japan) Naomi Osaka, 6−1, 1−0 ret.

=== Doubles ===
- (Indonesia) Aldila Sutjiadi / Vera Zvonareva def. (Australia) Ellen Perez / (Netherlands) Demi Schuurs, 6–1, 4–6, [10–5]

== Singles main-draw entrants ==
=== Seeds ===
Country	Player	Rank^{1}	Seed
POL	Iga Świątek	3	1
	Mirra Andreeva	5	2
UKR	Elina Svitolina	8	3
CZE	Karolína Muchová	10	4
CZE	Linda Nosková	13	5
JPN	Naomi Osaka	15	6
	Diana Shnaider	16	7
~~USA~~	~~Iva Jovic~~	~~17~~	~~8~~

- ^{1} Rankings are as of 15 June 2026.

=== Other entrants ===
The following players received wildcards into the main draw:

- (United Kingdom) Katie Boulter
- (Germany) Eva Lys
- (United States) Venus Williams
- (China) Zheng Qinwen

The following players received entry from the qualifying draw:

- (Romania) Irina-Camelia Begu
- (Austria) Sinja Kraus
- (Romania) Elena-Gabriela Ruse
- (Argentina) Solana Sierra

The following players received entry as a lucky loser:

- (Mexico) Renata Zarazúa

=== Withdrawals ===
- (United States) Hailey Baptiste → replaced by (Philippines) Alexandra Eala
- (Romania) Sorana Cîrstea → replaced by (China) Wang Xinyu
- (United States) Iva Jovic → replaced by (Mexico) Renata Zarazúa
- (Austria) Anastasia Potapova → replaced by (Czech Republic) Kateřina Siniaková

== Doubles main-draw entrants ==
=== Seeds ===
Country	Player	Country	Player	Rank^{1}	Seed
USA	Nicole Melichar-Martinez	NZL	Erin Routliffe	26	1
SVK	Tereza Mihalíková	GBR	Olivia Nicholls	44	2
AUS	Ellen Perez	NED	Demi Schuurs	47	3
UKR	Lyudmyla Kichenok	USA	Desirae Krawczyk	59	4

- ^{1} Rankings are as of 15 June 2026.

=== Other entrants ===
The following pair received wildcards into the doubles main draw:

- (Germany) Tessa Brockmann / (Germany) Ella Seidel
- (Philippines) Alexandra Eala / (United States) Venus Williams

The following pair received entry as alternates:

- (United States) Catherine Harrison / (Australia) Alexandra Osborne

=== Withdrawals ===
- (Japan) Shuko Aoyama / (Chinese Taipei) Liang En-shuo → replaced by (United States) Catherine Harrison / (Australia) Alexandra Osborne
