= 2021 Bad Homburg Open – Singles =

Singles
- 2021 Bad Homburg Open

Final
- Champion: (Germany) Angelique Kerber
- Runner-up: (Czech Republic) Kateřina Siniaková
- Score: 6–3, 6–2

Details
- Draw: 32 (4 Q / 3 WC )
- Seeds: 8

Events
Singles	Doubles
Bad Homburg Open	· 2022 →

Angelique Kerber defeated Kateřina Siniaková in the final, 6–3, 6–2, to win the singles tennis title at the 2021 Bad Homburg Open. It was Kerber's 13th career WTA Tour singles title, her first in three years.

This was the inaugural edition of the tournament.

== Seeds ==
1. (Czech Republic) Petra Kvitová (semifinals)
2. (Belarus) Victoria Azarenka (quarterfinals, withdrew)
3. (United States) Jessica Pegula (second round)
4. (Germany) Angelique Kerber (champion)
5. (Argentina) Nadia Podoroska (quarterfinals)
6. (Romania) Sorana Cîrstea (first round)
7. (Spain) Sara Sorribes Tormo (semifinals)
8. (Germany) Laura Siegemund (quarterfinals)

== Draw ==
=== Key ===
- Q = Qualifier
- WC = Wild card
- LL = Lucky loser
- Alt = Alternate
- SE = Special exempt
- PR = Protected ranking
- ITF = ITF entry
- JE = Junior exempt
- w/o = Walkover
- r = Retired
- d = Defaulted
- SR = Special ranking

=== Finals ===
Semifinals
1	(Czech Republic) Petra Kvitová	6	4	6^{3}
4	(Germany) Angelique Kerber	3	6	7^{7}
(Czech Republic) Kateřina Siniaková	6	6
7	(Spain) Sara Sorribes Tormo	2	4

Final
4	(Germany) Angelique Kerber	6	6
(Czech Republic) Kateřina Siniaková	3	2

=== Top half ===
First round
1	(Czech Republic) P Kvitová	4	6	6
Q	(Poland) K Piter	6	1	4
Q	(Germany) A Zaja	0	4
(United States) A Li	6	6
(Romania) PM Țig	7^{7}	6
WC	(Germany) M Barthel	6^{4}	3
WC	(Germany) M Guth	0	3
5	(Argentina) N Podoroska	6	6
4	(Germany) A Kerber	6	6
Q	(Russia) E Yashina	1	1
(Russia) A Blinkova	7^{7}	4	6
(Denmark) C Tauson	6^{4}	6	2
(Montenegro) D Kovinić	2	1
(United States) A Anisimova	6	6
(Germany) A Petkovic	6	6
6	(Romania) S Cîrstea	3	4

Second round
1	(Czech Republic) P Kvitová	6	6^{4}	6
(United States) A Li	2	7^{7}	1
(Romania) PM Țig	6^{4}	6	4
5	(Argentina) N Podoroska	7^{7}	2	6
4	(Germany) A Kerber	6	6
(Russia) A Blinkova	0	2
(United States) A Anisimova	6	7
(Germany) A Petkovic	1	5

Quarterfinals
1	(Czech Republic) P Kvitová	6	7^{12}
5	(Argentina) N Podoroska	3	6^{10}
4	(Germany) A Kerber	2	6	6
(United States) A Anisimova	6	3	3

Semifinals
1	(Czech Republic) P Kvitová	6	4	6^{3}
4	(Germany) A Kerber	3	6	7^{7}

=== Bottom half ===
First round
8	(Germany) L Siegemund	2	7^{7}	6
LL	(India) R Bhatia	6	6^{2}	1
(Sweden) R Peterson	5	6	6^{5}
(Germany) T Korpatsch	7	2	7^{7}
(Czech Republic) K Siniaková	6	6
(Russia) V Gracheva	3	2
(France) A Hesse	1	2
3	(United States) J Pegula	6	6
7	(Spain) S Sorribes Tormo	6	3	6
(Italy) M Trevisan	4	6	2
(Kazakhstan) A Danilina	2	2
(Japan) M Doi	6	6
(France) A Cornet	6	2	6
(Netherlands) A Rus	3	6	1
Q	(Belarus) Y Hatouka	5	0
2/WC	(Belarus) V Azarenka	7	6

Second round
8	(Germany) L Siegemund	6	6
(Germany) T Korpatsch	2	2
(Czech Republic) K Siniaková	6	5	6
3	(United States) J Pegula	3	7	4
7	(Spain) S Sorribes Tormo	6	6
(Japan) M Doi	4	4
(France) A Cornet	4	6	6^{7}
2/WC	(Belarus) V Azarenka	6	3	7^{9}

Quarterfinals
8	(Germany) L Siegemund	5	4
(Czech Republic) K Siniaková	7	6
7	(Spain) S Sorribes Tormo	w/o
2/WC	(Belarus) V Azarenka

Semifinals
(Czech Republic) K Siniaková	6	6
7	(Spain) S Sorribes Tormo	2	4

== Qualifying ==
=== Seeds ===
1. (Belarus) Yuliya Hatouka (qualified)
2. (India) Riya Bhatia (qualifying competition, lucky loser)
3. (Poland) Katarzyna Piter (qualified)
4. (Germany) Anna Zaja (qualified)
5. (Russia) Ekaterina Yashina (qualified)
6. (Belgium) Kimberley Zimmermann (qualifying competition)
7. (Germany) Nastasja Schunk (qualifying competition)
8. (Germany) Julia Middendorf (qualifying competition)

=== Qualifiers ===
1. (Belarus) Yuliya Hatouka
2. (Russia) Ekaterina Yashina
3. (Poland) Katarzyna Piter
4. (Germany) Anna Zaja

=== Lucky loser ===
1. (India) Riya Bhatia

=== Draw ===
==== First qualifier ====
Qualifying competition
1	(Belarus) Yuliya Hatouka	6	6
6	(Belgium) Kimberley Zimmermann	3	3

==== Second qualifier ====
Qualifying competition
2	(India) Riya Bhatia	6^{1}	0
5	(Russia) Ekaterina Yashina	7^{7}	6

==== Third qualifier ====
Qualifying competition
3	(Poland) Katarzyna Piter	7^{8}	2	7^{7}
7/WC	(Germany) Nastasja Schunk	6^{6}	6	6^{5}

==== Fourth qualifier ====
Qualifying competition
4/PR	(Germany) Anna Zaja	6	7
8/WC	(Germany) Julia Middendorf	2	5
