= 2026 Bad Homburg Open – Doubles =

Doubles
- 2026 Bad Homburg Open

Final
- Champions: (Indonesia) Aldila Sutjiadi; Vera Zvonareva
- Runners-up: (Australia) Ellen Perez (Netherlands) Demi Schuurs
- Score: 6–1, 4–6, [10–5]

Details
- Draw: 16 (2 WC)
- Seeds: 4

Events
Singles	Doubles
- Bad Homburg Open

Aldila Sutjiadi and Vera Zvonareva defeated Ellen Perez and Demi Schuurs in the final, 6–1, 4–6, [10–5] to win the doubles tennis title at the 2026 Bad Homburg Open.

Guo Hanyu and Alexandra Panova were the reigning champions, but Guo chose to compete at the Wimbledon qualifiers instead. Panova partnered Magali Kempen, but lost in the first round to Sutjiadi and Zvonareva.

== Seeds ==
1. (United States) Nicole Melichar-Martinez / (New Zealand) Erin Routliffe (first round)
2. (Slovakia) Tereza Mihalíková / (United Kingdom) Olivia Nicholls (semifinals)
3. (Australia) Ellen Perez / (Netherlands) Demi Schuurs (final)
4. (Ukraine) Lyudmyla Kichenok / (United States) Desirae Krawczyk (first round)

== Draw ==
Key

- Q = Qualifier
- WC = Wild card
- LL = Lucky loser
- Alt = Alternate
- ITF = ITF entry
- PR = Protected ranking
- SR = Special ranking
- SE = Special exempt
- JE = Junior exempt
- JR = Junior Accelerator Programme entrant
- CO = College Accelerator Programme entrant
- NG = Next Gen Accelerator Program entrant
- w/o = Walkover
- r = Retired
- d = Defaulted

First round
1	(United States) N Melichar-Martinez (New Zealand) E Routliffe	4	6	[2]
(Slovenia) A Klepač (Slovenia) N Radišić	6	4	[10]
(Indonesia) A Sutjiadi; V Zvonareva	6	4	[10]
(Belgium) M Kempen; A Panova	4	6	[8]
4	(Ukraine) L Kichenok (United States) D Krawczyk	6	5	[8]
(Germany) T Korpatsch (United Kingdom) E Webley-Smith	3	7	[10]
(Chinese Taipei) S-w Hsieh (China) Xin Wang	6	7
(Norway) U Eikeri (United States) Q Gleason	4	5
WC	(Germany) T Brockmann (Germany) E Seidel	4	1
(China) Q Tang (China) S Zhang	6	6
(Chinese Taipei) H-c Chan (Denmark) C Tauson	7^{7}	3	[6]
3	(Australia) E Perez (Netherlands) D Schuurs	6^{2}	6	[10]
Alt	(United States) C Harrison (Australia) A Osborne	3	4
WC	(Philippines) A Eala (United States) V Williams	6	6
(China) X Jiang (China) Y Xu	2	3
2	(Slovakia) T Mihalíková (United Kingdom) O Nicholls	6	6

Quarterfinals
(Slovenia) A Klepač (Slovenia) N Radišić	1	2
(Indonesia) A Sutjiadi; V Zvonareva	6	6
(Germany) T Korpatsch (United Kingdom) E Webley-Smith	4	3
(Chinese Taipei) S-w Hsieh (China) Xin Wang	6	6
(China) Q Tang (China) S Zhang	3	3
3	(Australia) E Perez (Netherlands) D Schuurs	6	6
WC	(Philippines) A Eala (United States) V Williams	3	2
2	(Slovakia) T Mihalíková (United Kingdom) O Nicholls	6	6

Semifinals
(Indonesia) A Sutjiadi; V Zvonareva	w/o
(Chinese Taipei) S-w Hsieh (China) Xin Wang
3	(Australia) E Perez (Netherlands) D Schuurs	6	6
2	(Slovakia) T Mihalíková (United Kingdom) O Nicholls	4	4

Final
(Indonesia) A Sutjiadi; V Zvonareva	6	4	[10]
3	(Australia) E Perez (Netherlands) D Schuurs	1	6	[5]
