= 2023 Bad Homburg Open – Doubles =

Doubles
- 2023 Bad Homburg Open

Final
- Champions: (Brazil) Ingrid Gamarra Martins; Lidziya Marozava
- Runners-up: (Japan) Eri Hozumi (Romania) Monica Niculescu
- Score: 6–0, 7–6^{(7–3)}

Events
Singles	Doubles
← 2022 ·	Bad Homburg Open	· 2024 →

Ingrid Gamarra Martins and Lidziya Marozava defeated the defending champion Eri Hozumi and her partner Monica Niculescu in the final, 6–0, 7–6^{(7–3)} to win the doubles title tennis at the 2023 Bad Homburg Open.

Hozumi and Makoto Ninomiya were the reigning champions, but chose to defend the title with different partners. Ninomiya partnered Tereza Mihalíková, but lost in the semifinals to Hozumi and Niculescu.

== Seeds ==
1. (Chile) Alexa Guarachi / (New Zealand) Erin Routliffe (first round)
2. Yana Sizikova / (Belgium) Kimberley Zimmermann (quarterfinals)
3. (Slovakia) Tereza Mihalíková / (Japan) Makoto Ninomiya (semifinals)
4. (Ukraine) Nadiia Kichenok / (Poland) Alicja Rosolska (quarterfinals)

== Draw ==
=== Key ===
- Q = Qualifier
- WC = Wild card
- LL = Lucky loser
- Alt = Alternate
- SE = Special exempt
- PR = Protected ranking
- ITF = ITF entry
- JE = Junior exempt
- w/o = Walkover
- r = Retired
- d = Defaulted
- SR = Special ranking

=== Draw ===
First round
1	(Chile) A Guarachi (New Zealand) E Routliffe	6	1	[8]
(Estonia) I Neel (Chinese Taipei) F-h Wu	1	6	[10]
(United States) S Chang (United States) A Kulikov	4	6	[10]
WC	(Germany) A-L Friedsam (Germany) V Heisen	6	3	[7]
4	(Ukraine) N Kichenok (Poland) A Rosolska	6	7^{7}
(Czech Republic) A Dețiuc (Georgia (country)) O Kalashnikova	2	6^{2}
(Brazil) I Gamarra Martins; L Marozava	4	6	[12]
(Norway) U Eikeri; A Panova	6	3	[10]
(Czech Republic) M Kolodziejová (Czech Republic) L Nosková	6	6
WC	(Italy) S Errani (Argentina) N Podoroska	4	3
PR	(Hungary) A Bondár (Romania) J Cristian	4	6^{4}
3	(Slovakia) T Mihalíková (Japan) M Ninomiya	6	7^{7}
(Georgia (country)) N Dzalamidze (United States) S Santamaria	5	4
(Japan) E Hozumi (Romania) M Niculescu	7	6
A Blinkova (France) V Gracheva	2	6	[7]
2	Y Sizikova (Belgium) K Zimmermann	6	1	[10]

Quarterfinals
(Estonia) I Neel (Chinese Taipei) F-h Wu	7^{7}	6
(United States) S Chang (United States) A Kulikov	6^{1}	1
4	(Ukraine) N Kichenok (Poland) A Rosolska	5	6^{2}
(Brazil) I Gamarra Martins; L Marozava	7	7^{7}
(Czech Republic) M Kolodziejová (Czech Republic) L Nosková	6^{3}	6	[2]
3	(Slovakia) T Mihalíková (Japan) M Ninomiya	7^{7}	3	[10]
(Japan) E Hozumi (Romania) M Niculescu	6	3	[10]
2	Y Sizikova (Belgium) K Zimmermann	2	6	[8]

Semifinals
(Estonia) I Neel (Chinese Taipei) F-h Wu	3	6^{4}
(Brazil) I Gamarra Martins; L Marozava	6	7^{7}
3	(Slovakia) T Mihalíková (Japan) M Ninomiya	7^{7}	4	[8]
(Japan) E Hozumi (Romania) M Niculescu	6^{5}	6	[10]

Final
(Brazil) I Gamarra Martins; L Marozava	6	7^{7}
(Japan) E Hozumi (Romania) M Niculescu	0	6^{3}
