= 2022 Bad Homburg Open – Singles =

Singles
- 2022 Bad Homburg Open

Final
- Champion: (France) Caroline Garcia
- Runner-up: (Canada) Bianca Andreescu
- Score: 6–7^{(5–7)}, 6–4, 6–4

Details
- Draw: 32 (4 Q / 3 WC )
- Seeds: 8

Events
| Singles | Doubles |
| ← 2021 · | Bad Homburg Open | · 2023 → |

Caroline Garcia defeated Bianca Andreescu in the final, 6–7^{(5–7)}, 6–4, 6–4 to win the singles tennis title at the 2022 Bad Homburg Open. She won the title after saving a match point in the semifinals, against Alizé Cornet.

Angelique Kerber was the defending champion, but lost in the quarterfinals to Cornet.

== Seeds ==
1. Daria Kasatkina (quarterfinals)
2. (Switzerland) Belinda Bencic (withdrew)
3. (Germany) Angelique Kerber (quarterfinals)
4. (Romania) Simona Halep (semifinals, withdrew)
5. Veronika Kudermetova (withdrew)
6. (United States) Amanda Anisimova (quarterfinals)
7. (Italy) Martina Trevisan (first round)
8. Liudmila Samsonova (first round)
9. (France) Alizé Cornet (semifinals)

== Draw ==
=== Key ===
- Q = Qualifier
- WC = Wild card
- LL = Lucky loser
- Alt = Alternate
- SE = Special exempt
- PR = Protected ranking
- ITF = ITF entry
- JE = Junior exempt
- w/o = Walkover
- r = Retired
- d = Defaulted
- SR = Special ranking

=== Finals ===
Semifinals
(Canada) Bianca Andreescu | w/o
4 | (Romania) Simona Halep
9 | (France) Alizé Cornet | 6^{9} | 6 | 5
(France) Caroline Garcia | 7^{11} | 3 | 7

Final
(Canada) Bianca Andreescu | 7^{7} | 4 | 4
(France) Caroline Garcia | 6^{5} | 6 | 6

=== Top half ===
First round
1 | D Kasatkina | 6 | 6
(Germany) A Petkovic | 1 | 2
(United States) C Liu | 2 | 2
WC | (Germany) J Niemeier | 6 | 6
Q | (United Kingdom) K Swan | 2 | 6 | 6
(United States) S Stephens | 6 | 4 | 2
(Canada) B Andreescu | 6 | 6
7 | (Italy) M Trevisan | 3 | 1
4 | (Romania) S Halep | 4 | 6 | 6
(Czech Republic) K Siniaková | 6 | 3 | 4
Q | Y Hatouka | 6 | 1 | 4
(Slovenia) T Zidanšek | 2 | 6 | 6
(United States) A Li | 7^{7} | 4 | 6
(Hungary) A Bondár | 6^{1} | 6 | 1
(Belgium) A Van Uytvanck | 6 | 3 | 6^{4}
6 | (United States) A Anisimova | 3 | 6 | 7^{7}

Second round
1 | D Kasatkina | 6 | 3 | 6
WC | (Germany) J Niemeier | 1 | 6 | 1
Q | (United Kingdom) K Swan | 4 | 4
(Canada) B Andreescu | 6 | 6
4 | (Romania) S Halep | 6 | 6
(Slovenia) T Zidanšek | 0 | 3
(United States) A Li | 0 | 2
6 | (United States) A Anisimova | 6 | 6

Quarterfinals
1 | D Kasatkina | 4 | 1
(Canada) B Andreescu | 6 | 6
4 | (Romania) S Halep | 6 | 6
6 | (United States) A Anisimova | 2 | 1

Semifinals
(Canada) B Andreescu | w/o
4 | (Romania) S Halep

=== Bottom half ===
First round
9 | (France) A Cornet | 6 | 6
A Kalinskaya | 2 | 4
A Potapova | 3 | 7 | 3
WC | (Germany) T Maria | 6 | 5 | 6
(Slovenia) K Juvan | 6 | 5 | 0^{r}
(Italy) L Bronzetti | 4 | 7 | 2
Q | A Gasanova | 2 | 2
3 | (Germany) A Kerber | 6 | 6
8 | L Samsonova | 6^{6} | 4
Q | K Rakhimova | 7^{8} | 6
A Sasnovich | 6 | 3 | 4
(France) C Garcia | 2 | 6 | 6
LL | (Japan) M Doi | 3 | 3
(Belgium) G Minnen | 6 | 6
WC | (Germany) S Lisicki | 6 | 7^{7}
LL | (Germany) T Korpatsch | 4 | 6^{5}

Second round
9 | (France) A Cornet | 7^{7} | 6
WC | (Germany) T Maria | 6^{4} | 4
(Italy) L Bronzetti | 2 | 3
3 | (Germany) A Kerber | 6 | 6
Q | K Rakhimova | 3 | 4
(France) C Garcia | 6 | 6
(Belgium) G Minnen | 3 | 6 | 2
WC | (Germany) S Lisicki | 6 | 2 | 6

Quarterfinals
9 | (France) A Cornet | 6 | 2 | 6
3 | (Germany) A Kerber | 4 | 6 | 1
(France) C Garcia | 6 | 7^{9}
WC | (Germany) S Lisicki | 3 | 6^{7}

Semifinals
9 | (France) A Cornet | 6^{9} | 6 | 5
(France) C Garcia | 7^{11} | 3 | 7

== Qualifying ==
=== Seeds ===
1. (Japan) Misaki Doi (qualifying competition, lucky loser)
2. (Germany) Tamara Korpatsch (qualifying competition, lucky loser)

=== Qualifiers ===
1. Yuliya Hatouka
2. (United Kingdom) Katie Swan
3. Kamilla Rakhimova
4. Anastasia Gasanova

=== Lucky losers ===
1. (Japan) Misaki Doi
2. (Germany) Tamara Korpatsch

=== Draw ===
==== First qualifier ====
| Qualifying competition |
| 1 | (Japan) Misaki Doi | 6^{5} | 3 |
| | Yuliya Hatouka | 7^{7} | 6 |

==== Second qualifier ====
| Qualifying competition |
| 2/WC | (Germany) Tamara Korpatsch | 2 | 1 |
| WC | (United Kingdom) Katie Swan | 6 | 6 |

==== Third qualifier ====
| Qualifying competition |
| PR | (China) Han Xinyun | 1 | 3 |
| | Kamilla Rakhimova | 6 | 6 |

==== Fourth qualifier ====
| Qualifying competition |
| Anna Blinkova | 6^{5} | 2 |
| Anastasia Gasanova | 7^{7} | 6 |
