= 2022 Bad Homburg Open – Doubles =

Doubles
- 2022 Bad Homburg Open

Final
- Champions: (Japan) Eri Hozumi (Japan) Makoto Ninomiya
- Runners-up: (Poland) Alicja Rosolska (New Zealand) Erin Routliffe
- Score: 6–4, 6–7^{(5–7)}, [10–5]

Events
| Singles | Doubles |
| ← 2021 · | Bad Homburg Open | · 2023 → |

Eri Hozumi and Makoto Ninomiya defeated Alicja Rosolska and Erin Routliffe in the final, 6–4, 6–7^{(5–7)}, [10–5] to win the doubles tennis title at the 2022 Bad Homburg Open.

Darija Jurak Schreiber and Andreja Klepač were the defending champions, but Jurak Schreiber was unable to participate due to injury and Klepač chose to play in Eastbourne instead.

== Seeds ==
1. (Japan) Eri Hozumi / (Japan) Makoto Ninomiya (champions)
2. (Poland) Alicja Rosolska / (New Zealand) Erin Routliffe (final)
3. (Ukraine) Nadiia Kichenok / (Romania) Raluca Olaru (quarterfinals)
4. (United States) Kaitlyn Christian / Lidziya Marozava (quarterfinals)

== Draw ==
=== Key ===
- Q = Qualifier
- WC = Wild card
- LL = Lucky loser
- Alt = Alternate
- SE = Special exempt
- PR = Protected ranking
- ITF = ITF entry
- JE = Junior exempt
- w/o = Walkover
- r = Retired
- d = Defaulted
- SR = Special ranking

=== Draw ===
First round
1 | (Japan) E Hozumi (Japan) M Ninomiya | 6^{3} | 6 | [13]
(Poland) K Piter (Belgium) K Zimmermann | 7^{7} | 4 | [11]
A Potapova; Y Sizikova | 7^{10} | 7^{7}
(Japan) M Kato (Indonesia) A Sutjiadi | 6^{8} | 6^{2}
4 | (United States) K Christian; L Marozava | 5 | 7^{9} | [10]
(Germany) V Heisen (United Kingdom) S Murray Sharan | 7 | 6^{7} | [8]
(Hungary) A Bondár (Belgium) G Minnen | 3 | 5
(Slovakia) T Mihalíková; A Sasnovich | 6 | 7
(France) E Lechemia (United States) S Santamaria | 7^{10} | 4 | [3]
(Georgia (country)) O Kalashnikova (United States) I Neel | 6^{8} | 6 | [10]
WC | (United States) S Stephens (United Kingdom) K Swan | 5 | 3
3 | (Ukraine) N Kichenok (Romania) R Olaru | 7 | 6
Alt | A Fomina-Kltoz; A Gasanova | 6 | 5 | [10]
(China) X Han (Czech Republic) R Voráčová | 4 | 7 | [8]
(Germany) J Lohoff; K Rakhimova | 6 | 5 | [6]
2 | (Poland) A Rosolska (New Zealand) E Routliffe | 3 | 7 | [10]

Quarterfinals
1 | (Japan) E Hozumi (Japan) M Ninomiya | 1 | 6 | [10]
A Potapova; Y Sizikova | 6 | 4 | [7]
4 | (United States) K Christian; L Marozava | 6 | 4 | [3]
(Slovakia) T Mihalíková; A Sasnovich | 4 | 6 | [10]
(Georgia (country)) O Kalashnikova (United States) I Neel | 6 | 6
3 | (Ukraine) N Kichenok (Romania) R Olaru | 3 | 4
Alt | A Fomina-Kltoz; A Gasanova | 2 | 2
2 | (Poland) A Rosolska (New Zealand) E Routliffe | 6 | 6

Semifinals
1 | (Japan) E Hozumi (Japan) M Ninomiya | 7 | 3 | [12]
(Slovakia) T Mihalíková; A Sasnovich | 5 | 6 | [10]
(Georgia (country)) O Kalashnikova (United States) I Neel | 3 | 2
2 | (Poland) A Rosolska (New Zealand) E Routliffe | 6 | 6

Final
1 | (Japan) E Hozumi (Japan) M Ninomiya | 6 | 6^{5} | [10]
2 | (Poland) A Rosolska (New Zealand) E Routliffe | 4 | 7^{7} | [5]
