= 2024 Bad Homburg Open – Singles =

Singles
- 2024 Bad Homburg Open

Final
- Champion: Diana Shnaider
- Runner-up: (Croatia) Donna Vekić
- Score: 6–3, 2–6, 6–3

Details
- Draw: 32 (4 Q / 4 WC)
- Seeds: 8

Events
Singles	Doubles
- Bad Homburg Open

Diana Shnaider defeated Donna Vekić in the final, 6–3, 2–6, 6–3 to win the singles tennis title at the 2024 Bad Homburg Open.

Kateřina Siniaková was the defending champion, but withdrew before her quarterfinal match against Vekić.

== Seeds ==
1. (Greece) Maria Sakkari (first round)
2. Liudmila Samsonova (second round)
3. (United States) Emma Navarro (semifinals)
4. (Brazil) Beatriz Haddad Maia (second round)
5. Victoria Azarenka (withdrew)
6. Ekaterina Alexandrova (second round)
7. (Ukraine) Elina Svitolina (first round)
8. Mirra Andreeva (first round)
9. Anna Kalinskaya (withdrew)

== Draw ==
Key

- Q = Qualifier
- WC = Wild card
- LL = Lucky loser
- Alt = Alternate
- ITF = ITF entry
- PR = Protected ranking
- SR = Special ranking
- SE = Special exempt
- JE = Junior exempt
- JR = Junior Accelerator Programme entrant
- CO = College Accelerator Programme entrant
- NG = Next Gen Accelerator Program entrant
- w/o = Walkover
- r = Retired
- d = Defaulted

=== Finals ===
Semifinals
Diana Shnaider	7	2	6
3	(United States) Emma Navarro	5	6	3
Q	(Bulgaria) Viktoriya Tomova	0	6^{6}
(Croatia) Donna Vekić	6	7^{8}

Final
Diana Shnaider	6	2	6
(Croatia) Donna Vekić	3	6	3

=== Top half ===
First round
1	(Greece) M Sakkari	6	2	6^{4}
LL	(Germany) J Niemeier	2	6	7^{7}
(Netherlands) A Rus	4	1
WC	(Spain) P Badosa	6	6
PR	(Germany) A Kerber	5	3
D Shnaider	7	6
(Ukraine) D Yastremska	4	6	6
8	M Andreeva	6	4	3
3	(United States) E Navarro	6	6
Q	(Romania) J Cristian	3	1
(United States) P Stearns	6	7
LL	(Germany) J Stusek	2	5
Q	(France) D Parry	6	5	1
V Kudermetova	3	7	6
WC	(Denmark) C Wozniacki	6	6^{4}	7
7	(Ukraine) E Svitolina	3	7^{7}	5

Second round
LL	(Germany) J Niemeier	6	2	1
WC	(Spain) P Badosa	4	6	6
D Shnaider	6	6
(Ukraine) D Yastremska	2	2
3	(United States) E Navarro	6	6
(United States) P Stearns	4	1
V Kudermetova	2	4
WC	(Denmark) C Wozniacki	6	6

Quarterfinals
WC	(Spain) P Badosa	3	6^{3}
D Shnaider	6	7^{7}
3	(United States) E Navarro	4	6	1
WC	(Denmark) C Wozniacki	6	1	0^{r}

Semifinals
D Shnaider	7	2	6
3	(United States) E Navarro	5	6	3

=== Bottom half ===
First round
LL	(United States) T Townsend	5	1
(Czech Republic) L Nosková	7	6
Q	(Bulgaria) V Tomova	6	6
WC	(Germany) T Maria	1	3
WC	(Canada) B Andreescu	4	2
A Blinkova	6	6
LL	(Germany) T Korpatsch	1	6^{6}
4	(Brazil) B Haddad Maia	6	7^{8}
6	E Alexandrova	6	6
(Argentina) N Podoroska	3	0
(Croatia) D Vekić	6	6
Q	(Italy) L Bronzetti	3	4
(Czech Republic) K Siniaková	6	6^{7}	6
(France) C Burel	3	7^{9}	1
(Spain) S Sorribes Tormo	3	1
2	L Samsonova	6	6

Second round
(Czech Republic) L Nosková	4	2
Q	(Bulgaria) V Tomova	6	6
A Blinkova	6	7
4	(Brazil) B Haddad Maia	3	5
6	E Alexandrova	4	6	3
(Croatia) D Vekić	6	3	6
(Czech Republic) K Siniaková	6	6^{3}	6
2	L Samsonova	3	7^{7}	3

Quarterfinals
Q	(Bulgaria) V Tomova	2	6	7^{11}
A Blinkova	6	1	6^{9}
(Croatia) D Vekić	w/o
(Czech Republic) K Siniaková

Semifinals
Q	(Bulgaria) V Tomova	0	6^{6}
(Croatia) D Vekić	6	7^{8}

== Qualifying ==
=== Seeds ===
1. (France) Diane Parry (qualified)
2. (Bulgaria) Viktoriya Tomova (qualified)
3. (Romania) Jaqueline Cristian (qualified)
4. (Italy) Lucia Bronzetti (qualified)

=== Qualifiers ===
1. (France) Diane Parry
2. (Bulgaria) Viktoriya Tomova
3. (Romania) Jaqueline Cristian
4. (Italy) Lucia Bronzetti

=== Lucky losers ===
1. (Germany) Tamara Korpatsch
2. (United States) Taylor Townsend
3. (Germany) Jule Niemeier
4. (Germany) Julia Stusek

=== Draw ===
==== First qualifier ====
Qualifying competition
1	(France) Diane Parry	6	3	6
WC	(Germany) Jule Niemeier	3	6	4

==== Second qualifier ====
Qualifying competition
2	(Bulgaria) Viktoriya Tomova	6	6
	(United States) Taylor Townsend	1	2

==== Third qualifier ====
Qualifying competition
3	(Romania) Jaqueline Cristian	6	6
WC	(Germany) Julia Stusek	3	4

==== Fourth qualifier ====
Qualifying competition
4	(Italy) Lucia Bronzetti	3	6	6
	(Germany) Tamara Korpatsch	6	0	1
