= Bad Homburg Open =

WTA Tour
- Event name: Bad Homburg Open powered by Solarwatt
- Founded: 2021
- Location: Bad Homburg, Hochtaunuskreis, Hesse; Germany
- Venue: TC Bad Homburg
- Category: WTA 500 (2024-present); WTA 250 (2021-2023)
- Surface: Grass – outdoors
- Draw: 32S / 16Q / 16D
- Prize money: €1,049,083 (2026)
- Website: website

Current champions (2026)
- Singles: (Czech Republic) Karolína Muchová
- Doubles: (Indonesia) Aldila Sutjiadi; Vera Zvonareva

The Bad Homburg Open, sponsored by Solarwatt, is an annual WTA Tour professional tennis tournament held on outdoor grass courts at the Bad Homburg Tennis Club in Bad Homburg, Germany, and is a WTA 500 event (since 2024). The event held its inaugural edition in June 2021 after it was initially postponed from 2020 due to the COVID-19 pandemic.

In September 2019, the All England Lawn Tennis and Croquet Club (AELTC) announced that they would invest in new grass tennis tournaments to be scheduled before the Wimbledon Championships on the ATP Tour and WTA Tour. Among the new investments included a WTA event planned for Bad Homburg with the collaboration of German sports agency Perfect Match as well as German tennis player Angelique Kerber and her management team, after which she would become the tournament ambassador. The new stadium at the Bad Homburg Tennis Club was built on the site of the first tennis court in continental Europe, Kurpark, and in July 2020, Kerber christened the stadium at its opening ceremony.

== Past finals ==
=== Singles ===
Year	Champions	Runners-up	Score
2020	Cancelled due to the COVID-19 pandemic		
↓ WTA 250 tournament ↓
2021	(Germany) Angelique Kerber	(Czech Republic) Kateřina Siniaková	6–3, 6–2
2022	(France) Caroline Garcia	(Canada) Bianca Andreescu	6–7^{(5–7)}, 6–4, 6–4
2023	(Czech Republic) Kateřina Siniaková	(Italy) Lucia Bronzetti	6–2, 7–6^{(7–5)}
↓ WTA 500 tournament ↓
2024	Diana Shnaider	(Croatia) Donna Vekić	6–3, 2–6, 6–3
2025	(United States) Jessica Pegula	(Poland) Iga Świątek	6–4, 7–5
2026	(Czech Republic) Karolína Muchová	(Japan) Naomi Osaka	6–1, 1–0 retd.

=== Doubles ===
Year	Champions	Runners-up	Score
2020	Cancelled due to the COVID-19 pandemic		
↓ WTA 250 tournament ↓
2021	(Croatia) Darija Jurak (Slovenia) Andreja Klepač	(Ukraine) Nadiia Kichenok (Romania) Raluca Olaru	6–3, 6–1
2022	(Japan) Eri Hozumi (Japan) Makoto Ninomiya	(Poland) Alicja Rosolska (New Zealand) Erin Routliffe	6–4, 6–7^{(5–7)}, [10–5]
2023	(Brazil) Ingrid Gamarra Martins; Lidziya Marozava	(Japan) Eri Hozumi (Romania) Monica Niculescu	6–0, 7–6^{(7–3)}
↓ WTA 500 tournament ↓
2024	(United States) Nicole Melichar-Martinez (Australia) Ellen Perez	(Chinese Taipei) Chan Hao-ching; Veronika Kudermetova	4–6, 6–3, [10–8]
2025	(China) Guo Hanyu; Alexandra Panova	(Ukraine) Lyudmyla Kichenok (Australia) Ellen Perez	4–6, 7–6^{(7–4)}, [10–5]
2026	(Indonesia) Aldila Sutjiadi; Vera Zvonareva	(Australia) Ellen Perez (Netherlands) Demi Schuurs	6–1, 4–6, [10–5]
