= Amanda Anisimova =

American tennis player (born 2001)

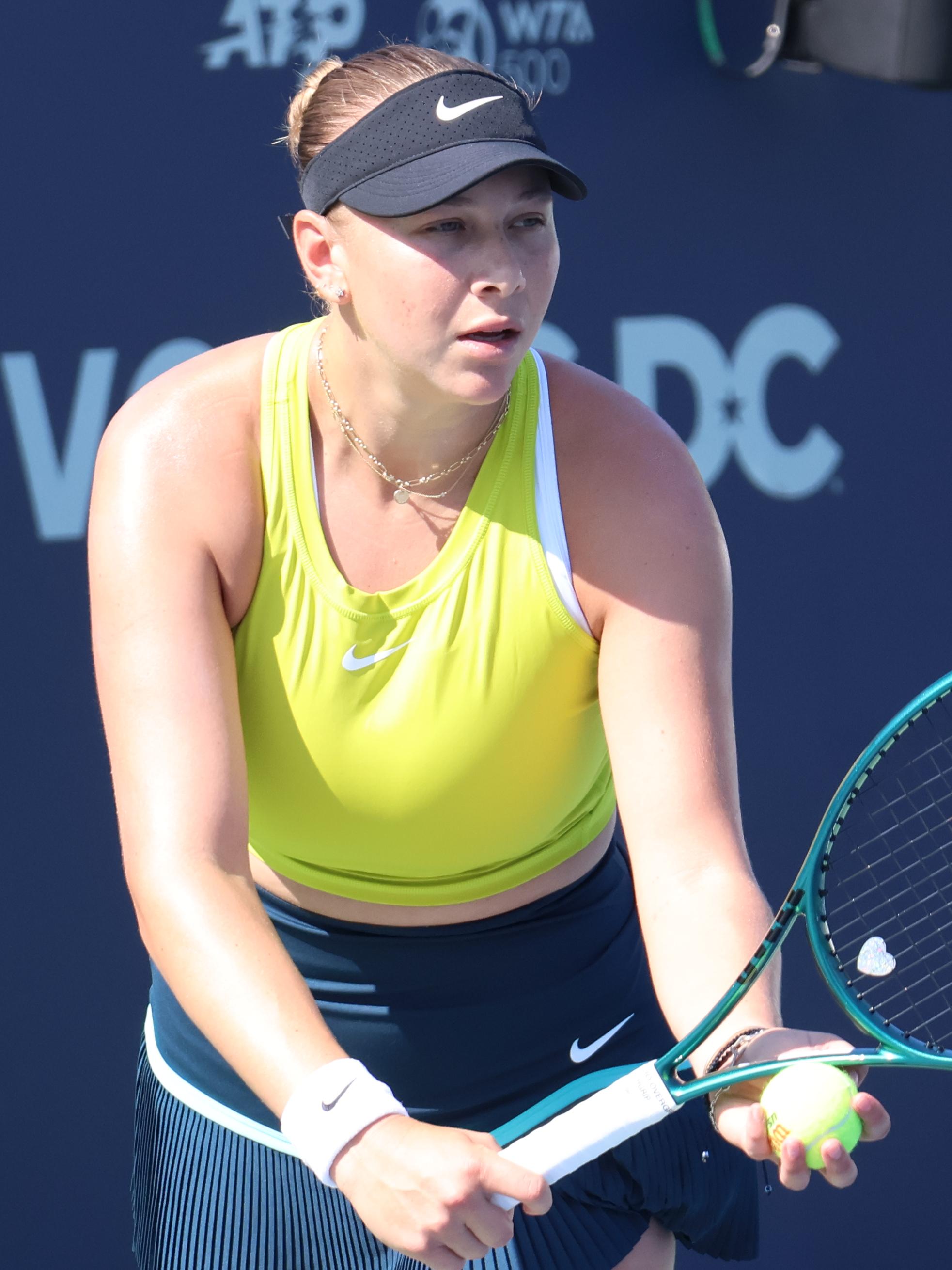
- Anisimova at the 2024 DC Open
- Full name: Amanda Kay Victoria Anisimova
- Country (sports): United States
- Born: August 31, 2001 (age 25) Freehold Township, New Jersey, US
- Height: 5 ft 11 in (180 cm)
- Turned pro: 2016
- Plays: Right (two-handed backhand)
- Coach: Hendrik Vleeshouwers
- Prize money: US$ 14,328,431

Singles
- Career record: 230–128
- Career titles: 4
- Highest ranking: No. 3 (January 5, 2026)
- Current ranking: No. 18 (October 19, 2026)

Grand Slam singles results
- Australian Open: QF (2026)
- French Open: SF (2019)
- Wimbledon: F (2025)
- US Open: F (2025)

Other tournaments
- Tour Finals: SF (2025)

Doubles
- Career record: 4–8
- Career titles: 0
- Highest ranking: No. 386 (June 24, 2019)

Grand Slam doubles results
- Australian Open: 1R (2019)
- French Open: 2R (2019, 2021)
- US Open: 1R (2017)

Grand Slam mixed doubles results
- Australian Open: 2R (2020)
- US Open: 1R (2017, 2018, 2025, 2026)
- Last updated on: October 19, 2026.

Amanda Kay Victoria Anisimova (/ˌænɪsɪˈmoʊvə/; born August 31, 2001) is an American professional tennis player. She has a career-high singles ranking of world No. 3, achieved in January 2026. Anisimova is a two-time major finalist, at the 2025 Wimbledon Championships and at the 2025 US Open. She has won four WTA Tour titles, including two WTA 1000 events.

In juniors, Anisimova won the 2017 US Open girls' singles and reached No. 2 in junior world rankings. In 2018, she reached the fourth round at the Indian Wells, upsetting No. 9 Petra Kvitová, and reached her first WTA final at the Japan Women's Open. In 2019, she won her maiden title at the Copa Colsanitas and reached the semifinals at the French Open, upsetting No. 3 and defending champion Simona Halep. In 2022, she won her second career title at the Melbourne Summer Set 2 and reached the quarterfinals at the Wimbledon Championships. Anisimova took a break away from the sport in 2023. In 2024, she made her first career WTA 1000 final at the Canadian Open, defeating No. 3 Aryna Sabalenka en route. In 2025, she won her first two career WTA 1000 titles at the Qatar Open and the China Open and reached her first two major finals at the Wimbledon Championships and the US Open.

== Early life and background ==
Amanda Anisimova was born in Freehold Township, New Jersey, on August 31, 2001, to Olga and Konstantin Anisimov. She has an older sister, Maria, who played college tennis for the University of Pennsylvania while attending Wharton's undergraduate business school. Her parents emigrated from Russia to the United States in 1998. They worked in the finance and banking industries.

Anisimova started playing tennis at age five. She credits her sister as her inspiration for taking up the sport, saying: "When I was little, she was playing tennis. I always saw her playing, and I wanted to do it too. That's how I got into it and my parents got into it too." Her family moved to Florida in 2004 when Amanda was very young, so she and her sister would have more opportunities to train and find coaches. Her father long acted as her primary coach while she was a junior, and her mother has also helped coach her. She worked with Nick Saviano starting at age 11. Max Fomine, who has also been an assistant coach for the Bryan brothers, has served as her traveling coach.

== Juniors ==
Anisimova achieved a career-high ITF junior ranking of No. 2 in the world in 2016. Early in her junior career she entered the 2015 Abierto Juvenil Mexicano ranked outside the top 300, but unexpectedly won the high-level Grade A tournament at age 14. She continued to excel in 2016, winning the Grade 1 Copa del Café and reaching the final at the Grade A Copa Gerdau. On the strength of these results, Anisimova was the No. 2 seed at the French Open. In her second Grand Slam tournament, she became the first American finalist at the girls' event since Ashley Harkleroad in 2002. However, she lost the final to Rebeka Masarova. During the summer, she competed in the USTA Girls' 18s National Championship as the No. 5 seed and finished in 4th place.

As a 15-year-old Anisimova won two more big titles, the first at the Grade-1 Yucatán Cup in late 2016, and the second at the Grade-A Copa Gerdau in early 2017 where she had been a finalist a year earlier. Following these titles, she played in only two more ITF junior tournaments that year, both of which were major events. She capped off her junior career by winning her first major title at the US Open where she defeated fellow American Coco Gauff in the final and did not drop a set during the tournament. Anisimova was also a member of the United States team that won the 2017 Junior Fed Cup, but did not play in the final tie due to illness.

== Professional ==
=== 2016–17: ITF Circuit title, WTA Tour debut ===
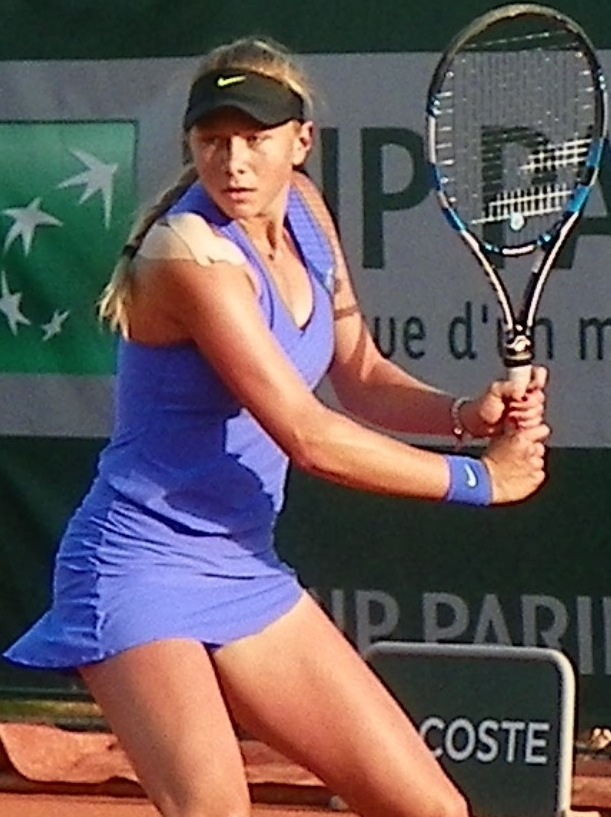
Anisimova at the 2017 French Open

In the middle of 2016, at the age of 14, Anisimova received a wildcard into US Open qualifying. In her first professional tournament, she won her debut match against world No. 124, Verónica Cepede Royg, then lost in the following round.

Following her junior title at the 2017 Copa Gerdau in February, Anisimova stayed in Brazil and played in a 25k event in Curitiba. She reached her first final on the pro tour in her first professional main draw. A few weeks later, Anisimova was awarded a wildcard into the Miami Open. In her WTA Tour main-draw debut, she lost in the first round to Taylor Townsend, in three sets.

During the clay-court season, Anisimova reached back-to-back finals at the 80k event in Indian Harbour Beach and the 60k event in Dothan, Alabama the following week. These results helped her win the USTA French Open Wildcard Challenge and crack the top 300 of the WTA rankings. At 15 years old, Anisimova became the youngest player to participate in the French Open main draw since Alizé Cornet in 2005. In her major main-draw debut, she lost her first-round match to Kurumi Nara.

After forgoing the grass-court season, Anisimova continued to play on the ITF Pro Circuit. She broke into the top 200 by capturing her first professional title at the 60k event in Sacramento, California in late July.

=== 2018: WTA 250 final, top 100 ===
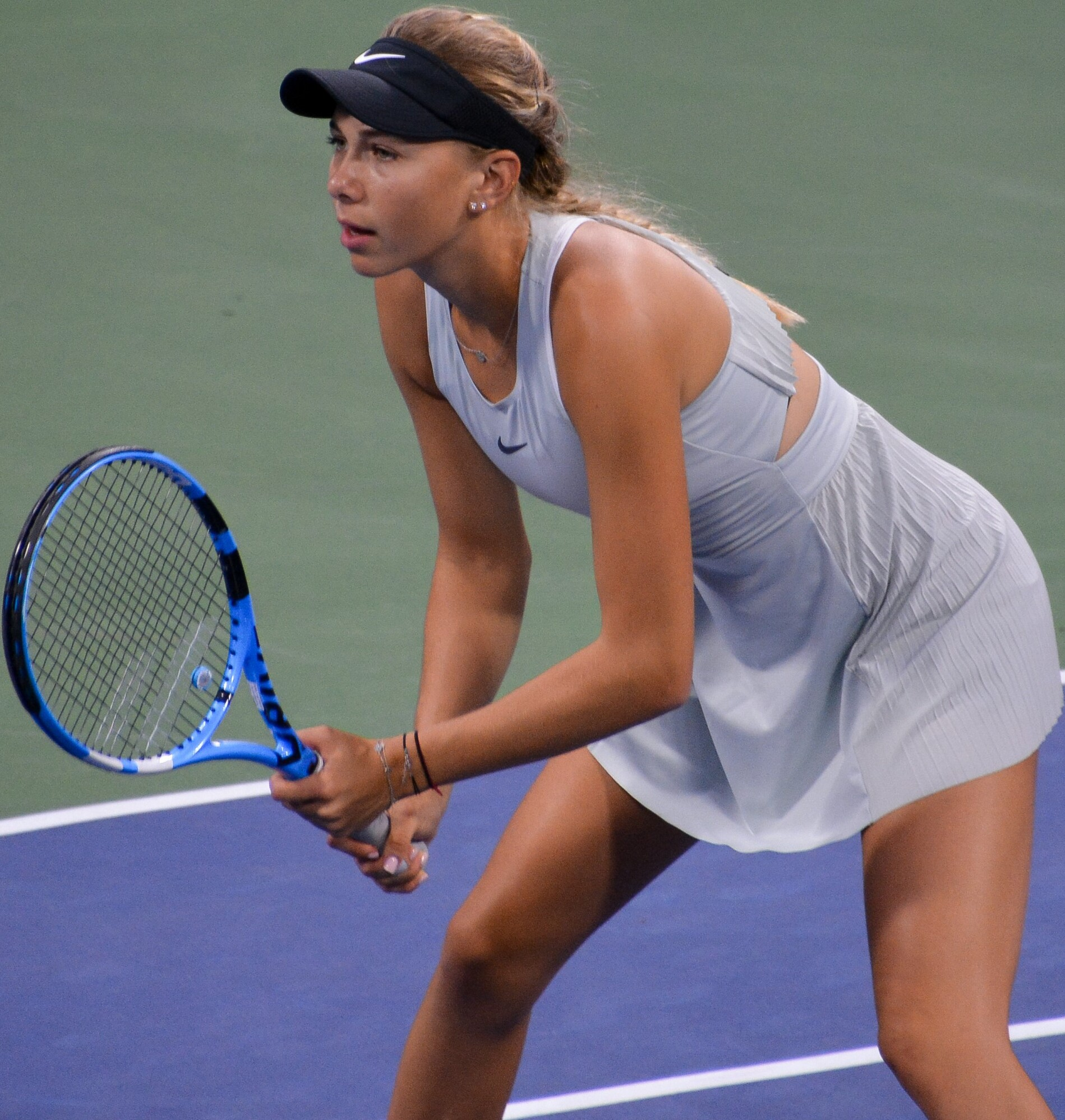
Anisimova at the 2018 US Open

Anisimova entered the inaugural Challenger Series events at Newport Beach and Indian Wells at the start of the year. She qualified for both main draws, and her semifinal at Indian Wells helped her earn a main-draw wildcard into the WTA Tour event there the following week. At the Indian Wells Open, Anisimova won her first WTA main-draw match against Pauline Parmentier. In the second round, she defeated No. 23 Anastasia Pavlyuchenkova. In the third round, she defeated No. 9 Petra Kvitová for her first top-10 win. At 16 year old, she became the youngest player to reach the fourth round at the Indian Wells since Viktoriya Kutuzova in 2005. She lost in the fourth round to No. 5 Karolína Plíšková in straight sets. Anisimova was also awarded a wildcard into the Miami Open. She won her opening match against Wang Qiang despite injuring her right foot in the third set. This injury forced her to withdraw from the tournament and kept her out for four months.

Anisimova returned to tennis in July at the Silicon Valley Classic after qualifying. She defeated Wang Qiang again, but lost in the second round to No. 24 Mihaela Buzărnescu. At the Cincinnati Open, she defeated Tímea Babos and qualifier Petra Martić, before losing to No. 7, Elina Svitolina. Anisimova received a wildcard into the US Open, but lost in the first round to Taylor Townsend.

Anisimova entered the Japan Women's Open after qualifying. She defeated Jana Fett and Zheng Saisai to reach her first tour quarterfinal. She defeated Anna Karolína Schmiedlová to reach her first WTA semifinal. She defeated Zhang Shuai to reach her first WTA Tour final. At 17 years old, she became the youngest player to make a tour final since Donna Vekić in 2013. She lost the final to Hsieh Su-wei in straight sets. Despite the loss, Anisimova cracked the top 100 for the first time.

=== 2019: French Open semis, WTA 250 title, top 30 ===
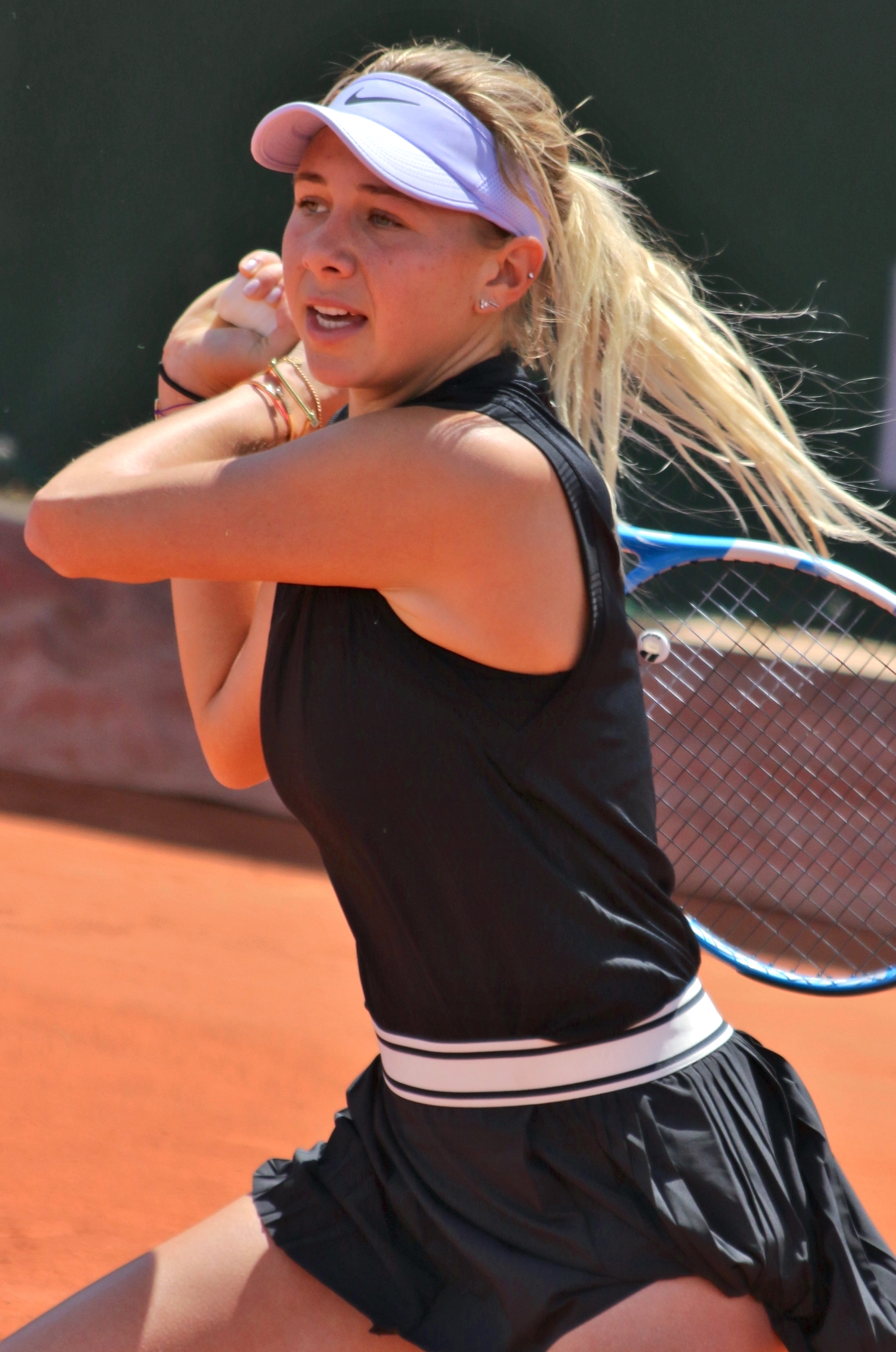
Anisimova at the 2019 French Open

Anisimova started the season in Auckland. She defeated qualifier Jana Čepelová and Barbora Strýcová to reach the quarterfinals, where she lost to Viktória Hrunčáková in three sets. At the Australian Open, she won her first major main-draw match against Monica Niculescu. In the second round, she upset No. 24 Lesia Tsurenko in straight sets. In the third round, she upset No. 11 Aryna Sabalenka in straight sets. She lost in the fourth round to No. 6 Petra Kvitová in straight sets.

Anisimova came into the Copa Colsanitas without a clay-court win at WTA-level. However, she overcame wildcard entrant Sabine Lisicki, Varvara Lepchenko, wildcard entrant Camila Osorio, and qualifier Beatriz Haddad Maia to reach her second WTA final. She defeated Astra Sharma in three sets to win her first WTA title. As a result, she reached a new career-high ranking of No. 54.

At the French Open, Anisimova defeated wildcard entrant Harmony Tan in the first round. In the second round, she upset No. 11 Aryna Sabalenka again in straight sets. She defeated Irina-Camelia Begu and qualifier Aliona Bolsova to reach her first major quarterfinal. In the quarterfinals, she upset No. 3 and defending champion Simona Halep in straight sets. At 17 year old, she became the youngest player to reach French Open semifinals since Nicole Vaidišová in 2006. She lost in the semifinals to No. 8 and eventual champion Ashleigh Barty in three sets. Consequently, Anisimova reached a career-high ranking of No. 26.

At the Mallorca Open, Anisimova defeated qualifier Tereza Martincová and Alizé Cornet to reach the quarterfinals, where she lost to No. 13 Belinda Bencic in straight sets. At Wimbledon, she defeated Sorana Cirstea before losing to Magda Linette.

At the Silicon Valley Classic, Anisimova defeated Madison Brengle to reach the quarterfinals, where she lost to eventual champion Zheng Saisai, in three sets. She dealt with a back injury during the event, which led her to withdraw from both Premier 5 events within the next month. Anisimova withdrew from the US Open following the death of her father.

=== 2020: WTA 250 semifinal ===
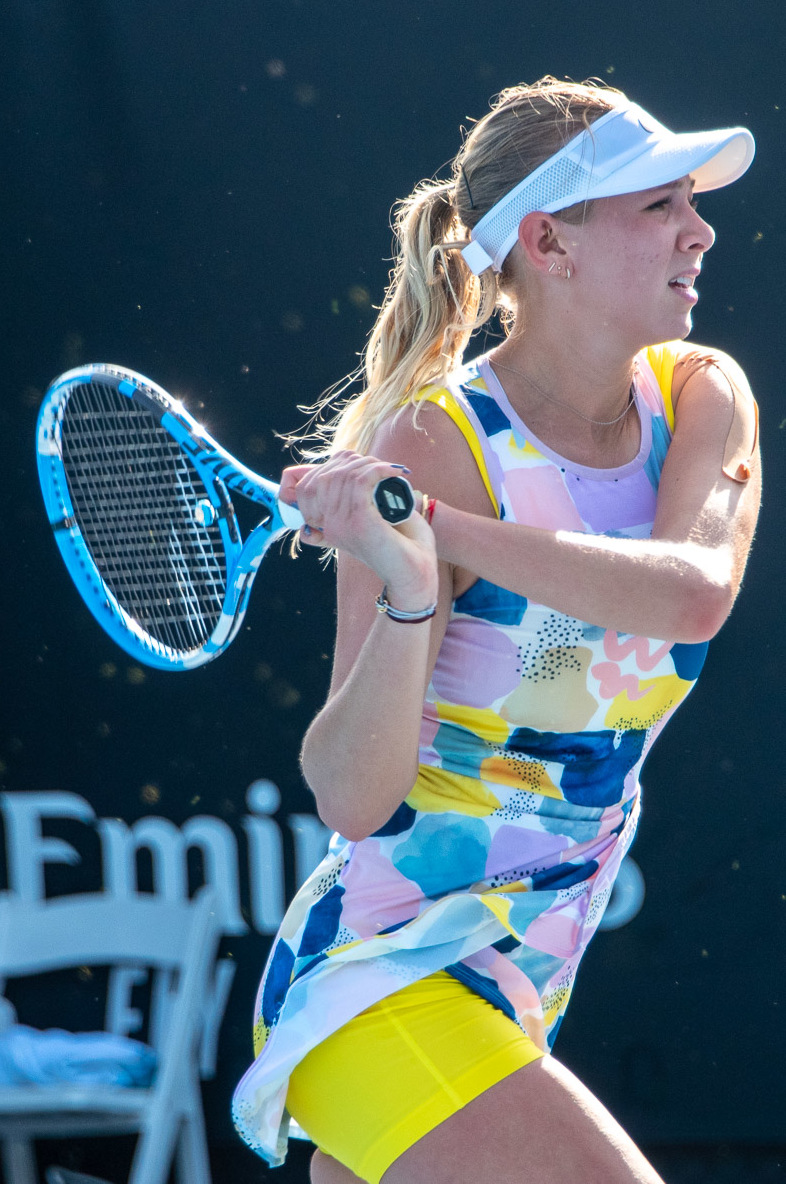
Anisimova at the 2020 Australian Open

Anisimova began 2020 in Auckland. She defeated Kateryna Kozlova, Daria Kasatkina, and wildcard entrant Eugenie Bouchard to reach the semifinals, where she fell to No. 10 and eventual champion, Serena Williams, in straight sets. At the Australian Open, she lost in the first round to Zarina Diyas.

At the Qatar Ladies Open, Anisimova defeated No. 26 Ekaterina Alexandrova and No. 7 Elina Svitolina, but withdrew from her third-round match.

After the COVID-19 pandemic shut down the WTA Tour, Anisimova entered the Cincinnati Open in August. She defeated No. 19 Alison Riske-Amritraj before losing to qualifier Jessica Pegula. At the US Open, she defeated Viktoriya Tomova and wildcard entrant Katrina Scott before losing to No. 22 Maria Sakkari.

At the French Open, Anisimova defeated Tamara Korpatsch and Bernarda Pera, before losing to world No. 2, Simona Halep.

=== 2021: WTA 250 quarters ===
Anisimova was forced to miss the Australian Open after testing positive to COVID-19 earlier in January.

At the Emilia-Romagna Open, Anisimova defeated Jasmine Paolini and qualifier Anna Karolina Schmiedlova to reach the quarterfinals, where she lost to eventual champion, Coco Gauff, in straight sets. At the French Open, she lost in the first round to Veronika Kudermetova. Her ranking fell outside the top 50.

At the Bad Homburg Open, Anisimova defeated Danka Kovinić and Andrea Petkovic to reach the quarterfinals, where she lost to No. 28 and eventual champion Angelique Kerber in three sets. At Wimbledon, she lost in the first round to Magda Linette.

Anisimova entered the Canadian Open after qualifying. She defeated qualifiers Tereza Martincova and Océane Dodin to reach the third round, where she lost to No. 6 Karolína Plíšková. At the US Open, she defeated Zarina Diyas before losing again to Karolína Plíšková.

At the Indian Wells, Anisimova defeated wildcard entrant Katrina Scott and Camila Giorgi, before losing to fifth seed Barbora Krejčíková.

=== 2022: Wimbledon quarterfinal, WTA 250 title ===
Anisimova started the season at the Melbourne Summer Set 2. She defeated Alison Van Uytvanck, Sorana Cirstea, Irina-Camelia Begu, and No. 26 Daria Kasatkina to make it to the final. She defeated qualifier Aliaksandra Sasnovich in three sets to win her second career singles title.

At the Australian Open, Anisimova defeated qualifier Arianne Hartono in the first round. In the second round, she defeated No. 22 Belinda Bencic in straight sets. In the third round, she came from a set down to upset No. 14 and defending champion Naomi Osaka, saving two match points in the process. She lost in the fourth round to world No. 1 and eventual champion, Ashleigh Barty, in straight sets. As a result, her ranking moved back inside the top 50.

Anisimova started her clay-court season at the Charleston Open and defeated qualifier Sachia Vickery and Yulia Putintseva to reach the third round; she came back from a set down to upset No. 5 Aryna Sabalenka. She defeated lucky loser Coco Vandeweghe to reach the semifinals, where she lost to No. 10 Ons Jabeur, in three sets.

At the Madrid Open, Anisimova defeated No. 4 Sabalenka again in the first round in three sets. In the second round, she defeated qualifier Petra Martić, before beating No. 17 Victoria Azarenka in straight sets to reach her first WTA 1000 quarterfinal, where she lost to qualifier Ekaterina Alexandrova, in straight sets.

At the Italian Open, Anisimova defeated qualifier Tereza Martincova in the first round. She defeated No. 14 Belinda Bencic and No. 9 Danielle Collins in straight sets to reach her second WTA 1000 quarterfinal, where she lost to No. 8 Aryna Sabalenka in three sets. Despite the loss, her ranking rose to the top 30.

At the French Open, Anisimova defeated Naomi Osaka again in the first round in straight sets. In the second, she defeated qualifier Donna Vekić, and reached the fourth round as Karolína Muchová retired due to injury. There she lost to No. 18 Leylah Fernandez, in three sets.

Anisimova started her grass-court season at the Bad Homburg Open. She defeated Alison Van Uytvanck and Ann Li to reach the quarterfinals, where she lost to No. 19 Simona Halep, in straight sets. At the Wimbledon Championships, Anisimova defeated lucky loser Yuan Yue and Lauren Davis to reach the third round. There, she came from a set down to defeat No. 12 Coco Gauff. She defeated Harmony Tan to reach her second major quarterfinal. In the quarterfinals, she lost again to No. 18 Simona Halep in straight sets.

Anisimova began the North American hardcourt season at the Silicon Valley Classic. She defeated wildcard entrant Ashlyn Krueger and No. 15 Karolína Plíšková to reach the quarterfinals, where she lost to Shelby Rogers, in straight sets. At the US Open, she was eliminated in the first round by Yulia Putintseva.

=== 2023: Break from tennis ===
Anisimova started her season in Adelaide where she lost in round one to No. 9 Veronika Kudermetova. Entering the second tournament as a lucky loser, she defeated No. 19 Liudmila Samsonova, before losing to No. 15 Haddad Maia. At the Australian Open, she lost in the first round to Marta Kostyuk.

At the Dubai Championships, Anisimova defeated wildcard entrant Vera Zvonareva, before losing to No. 14 Victoria Azarenka. At the Indian Wells, she lost her opening-round match to Linda Nosková. In Miami, she retired during her first-round match against Madison Brengle. In Madrid, she lost in the first round to qualifier Arantxa Rus.

On May 5th, Anisimova announced on her Instagram account that she would be taking an indefinite break from tennis, citing burnout and concerns for her mental health.

=== 2024: WTA 1000 final ===
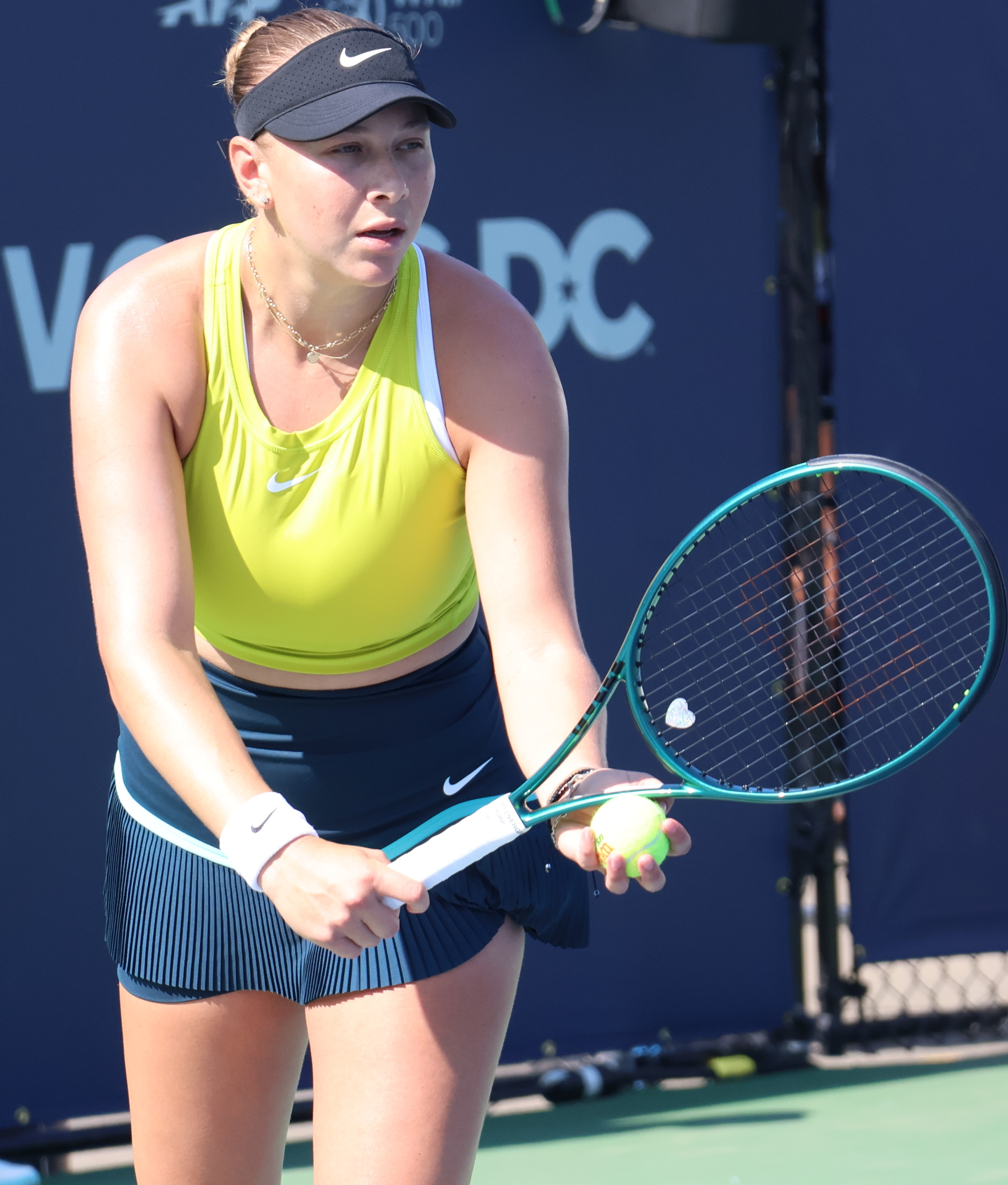
Anisimova serving at the 2024 Washington Open

Anisimova made her return to tennis in Auckland using protected ranking. She beat Anastasia Pavlyuchenkova before losing to Marie Bouzková. She entered the Australian Open using protected ranking. She defeated No. 14 Liudmila Samsonova, Nadia Podoroska, and Paula Badosa to reach the fourth round, where she lost to world No. 2, Aryna Sabalenka, in straight sets.

At the French Open, Anisimova defeated qualifier Rebecca Šramková, before losing to No. 17 Liudmila Samsonova. She lost in the third round of qualifying at Wimbledon.

Anisimova entered the Washington DC Open after qualifyingand defeated Sloane Stephens and Anastasia Pavlyuchenkova to reach the quarterfinals, where she lost to Caroline Dolehide in straight sets.

Ranked No. 132, Anisimova entered the Canadian Open using protected ranking. She defeated Caroline Dolehide in the first round. In the second, she defeated No. 12 Daria Kasatkina in straight sets. She reached the quarterfinals when No. 17 Anna Kalinskaya retired while trailing by a set. She upset No. 3 Aryna Sabalenka in straight sets to reach her first WTA 1000 semifinal. She defeated No. 15 Emma Navarro in three sets to reach her first WTA 1000 final, becoming the second-lowest ranked WTA 1000 finalist in history. She lost the final to No. 6 and defending champion Jessica Pegula in three sets. As a result, her ranking moved back inside the top 50.

Anisimova secured a main-draw wildcard for the US Open by winning the US Open Wildcard Challenge, but lost in the first round to No. 7 Zheng Qinwen.

=== 2025: Two WTA 1000 titles and major finals, top 5 ===
Anisimova started the season in Auckland. She lost in the first round to Alycia Parks. At the Hobart International, Anisimova defeated wildcard entrant Daria Saville and qualifier Anna Bondár to reach the quarterfinals, but withdrew due to illness prior to her match against Elina Avanesyan. At the Australian Open she defeated María Lourdes Carlé, before losing to Emma Raducanu.

At the Qatar Ladies Open, Anisimova defeated Victoria Azarenka, No. 10 Paula Badosa, and Leylah Fernandez, without dropping a set, to reach the quarterfinals. She defeated Marta Kostyuk in three sets and Ekaterina Alexandrova in straight sets to reach her second WTA 1000 final. She stunned Jeļena Ostapenko in straight sets to win her first WTA 1000 title. As a result, she broke into the top 20 for the first time.

At the Charleston Open, Anisimova defeated Veronika Kudermetova, No. 23 Yulia Putintseva, and No. 11 Emma Navarro, without dropping a set, to reach the semifinals. She retired in her semifinal match against Sofia Kenin. At the French Open, she advanced to the second round when qualifier Nina Stojanović retired while trailing by a set. She defeated Viktorija Golubic and No. 22 Clara Tauson to reach the fourth round, where she lost to world No. 1, Aryna Sabalenka, in straight sets.

At the Queen's Club Championships, Anisimova defeated wildcard entrants Jodie Burrage and Sonay Kartal to reach the quarterfinals. She defeated No. 10 Emma Navarro in straight sets to reach the semifinals. She defeated No. 5 Zheng Qinwen in three sets to reach her first final on grass courts. She lost in the final to qualifier Tatjana Maria, in straight sets.

At the Berlin Open, Anisimova defeated wildcard entrant Bianca Andreescu and Magdalena Fręch to reach the quarterfinals, where she lost to Liudmila Samsonova in straight sets.

At the Wimbledon Championships, Anisimova double-bageled Yulia Putintseva in the first round. In the second, she beat Renata Zarazúa in straight sets. She defeated Dalma Gálfi and No. 27 Linda Nosková in three sets to reach her second quarterfinal at Wimbledon. She defeated Anastasia Pavlyuchenkova in straight sets to reach her second major semifinal and first at Wimbledon. She upset world No. 1 Aryna Sabalenka in three sets to advance to her first major final. She lost to No. 4 Iga Świątek by a double bagel in the final, which The Guardian called "the most one-sided final in 114 years". Nonetheless, Anisimova made her top-10 debut following the tournament, at world No. 7.

In September, she beat Iga Świątek in the quarterfinals in a rematch of the Wimbledon final, and then Naomi Osaka in the semifinals to reach the US Open final. Anisimova lost in straight sets to Sabalenka with the second set reaching a tiebreak. However, she recorded a new career-high ranking of world No. 4, on 8 September 2025.

Following her win against Jasmine Paolini in the quarterfinals of the China Open, Anisimova qualified for the WTA Finals for the first time. She advanced to the semifinals with wins over Świątek and Madison Keys, but lost to Sabalenka in the semifinal match in three sets.

=== 2026: Australian Open quarterfinal ===
On January 5, 2026, Anisimova reached a new career-high of world No. 3 in the WTA rankings. At the Australian Open, she defeated Simona Waltert, Kateřina Siniaková, Peyton Stearns and Wang Xinyu to reach the quarterfinals, at which point her run was ended by sixth seed Jessica Pegula. In February at the Dubai Tennis Championships, Anisimova was given a bye as second seed and then a walkover when Barbora Krejčíková withdrew from the tournament due to a thigh injury. She then recorded wins over wildcard entrant Janice Tjen and fifth seed Mirra Andreeva to make it through to the semifinals, where she lost to fourth seed Jessica Pegula in three sets.

Anisimova reached back-to-back WTA 1000 fourth rounds in March at Indian Wells, where she lost to 10th seed Victoria Mboko, and in Miami, where she was eliminated by 12th seed Belinda Bencic. In April she withdrew from the Madrid Open because of a wrist injury. The following month, seeded sixth at the French Open, Anisimova lost to Diane Parry in the third round. She also exited in the third round at Wimbledon, losing to Madison Keys. At the Canadian Open, she reached the fourth round, losing to Elina Svitolina. At the Cincinnati Open, she defeated Zeynep Sönmez, Alexandra Eala, and Linda Nosková to reach the quarterfinals, where she lost in three sets to compatriot Jessica Pegula. At the US Open, she reached the third round losing to Anastasia Potapova, in straight sets. She missed the entire Asian swing after withdrawing from the Singapore Open and China Open due to a left wrist injury, ending her season.

== Playing style ==
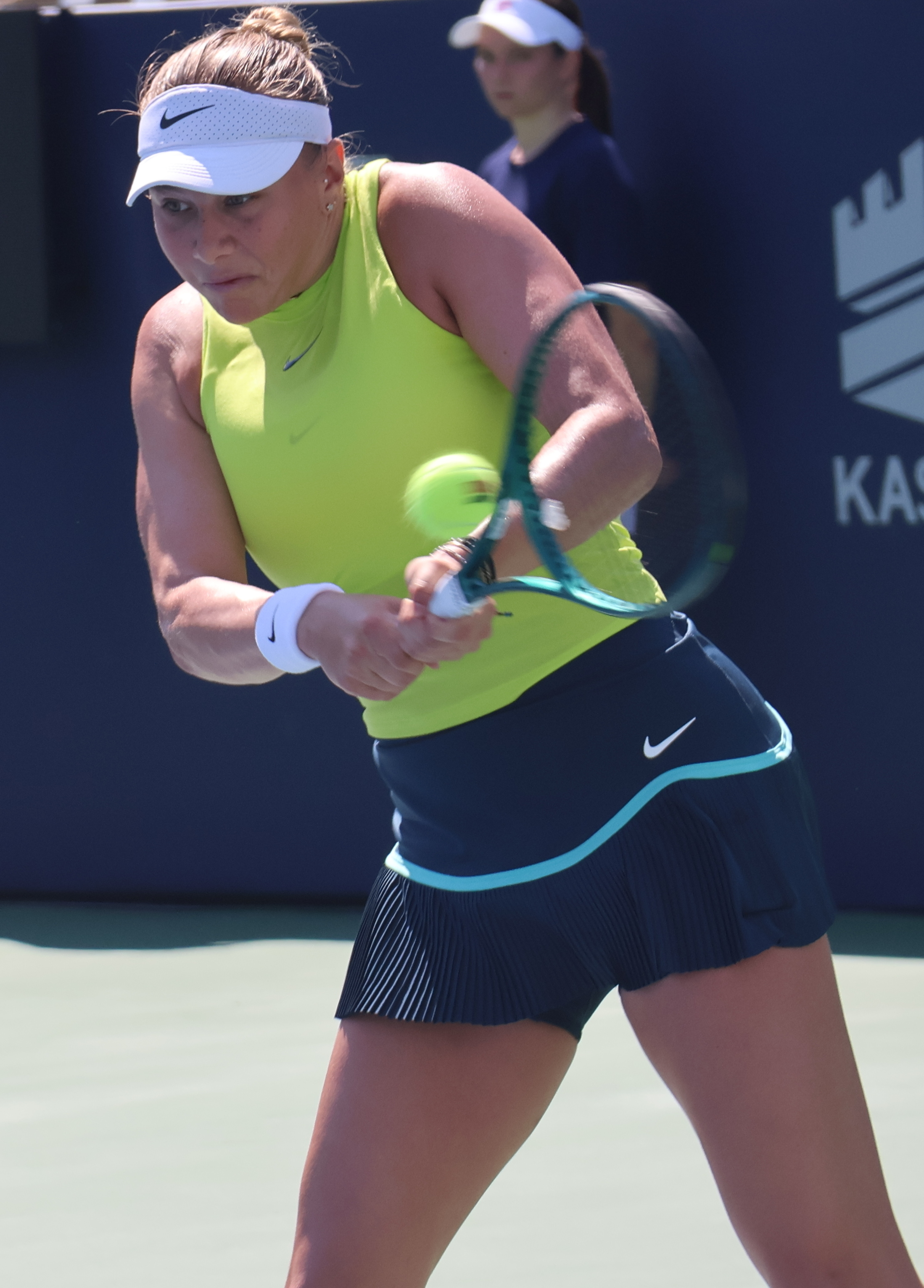
Anisimova hitting a backhand return

Anisimova is an aggressive baseliner, with powerful groundstrokes from both wings. Her two-handed backhand is her most potent weapon, and is hit consistently with depth, speed, and power; she produces many winners with her backhand down-the-line. Her forehand is also strong, and is hit flat with a condensed swing, allowing her to generate sharp angles with this stroke. She can hit her forehand effectively at any ball height, rendering her forehand deadly on any surface. She is fast around the court, and her footwork is quick and intricate, allowing her to extend rallies until she can create an opportunity to hit a winner.

== Coaches ==
In June 2024, Anisimova hired Hendrik Vleeshouwers to be her coach. Vleeshouwers was named the 2025 WTA Coach of the Year for his leadership in coaching Anisimova to a career-best season.

== Endorsements ==
In 2019, Anisimova signed a long-term, multi-million dollar deal with Nike. Since 2022, Anisimova has been sponsored by Wilson for racquets. Previously, she had been sponsored by Babolat. In 2020, Anisimova signed sponsorship deals with Gatorade and Therabody. In 2025, Anisimova partnered with Vita Coco and Lalo Tequila.

== Personal life ==
On 19 August 2019, one week before the start of the year's US Open, Anisimova's father and coach Konstantin died at age 52 of a heart attack. Anisimova subsequently withdrew from the tournament. She told The New York Times in 2020, “This is obviously the hardest thing I’ve had to go through and the hardest thing that’s ever happened to me, and I don’t really talk about it with anyone. The only thing that has helped me is just playing tennis and being on the court. That’s what makes me happy, and I know it would make him happy, so that’s the way it is.”

Anisimova took a break from tennis in May 2023, citing mental health concerns and burnout, and returned to the sport in January 2024.

== Career statistics ==
=== Grand Slam tournament performance ===
Key
W	F	SF	QF	#R	RR	Q#	DNQ	A	NH

(W) winner; (F) finalist; (SF) semifinalist; (QF) quarterfinalist; (#R) rounds 4, 3, 2, 1; (RR) round-robin stage; (Q#) qualification round; (DNQ) did not qualify; (A) absent; (NH) not held; (SR) strike rate (events won / competed); (W–L) win–loss record.
To avoid confusion and double counting, these charts are updated at the conclusion of a tournament or when the player's participation has ended.

==== Singles ====
Current through the 2026 US Open.

Tournament	2016	2017	2018	2019	2020	2021	2022	2023	2024	2025	2026	SR	W–L	Win %
Australian Open	A	A	A	4R	1R	A	4R	1R	4R	2R	QF	0 / 7	14–7	67%
French Open	A	1R	A	SF	3R	1R	4R	A	2R	4R	3R	0 / 8	16–8	67%
Wimbledon	A	A	A	2R	NH	1R	QF	A	Q3	F	3R	0 / 5	13–5	72%
US Open	Q2	Q1	1R	A	3R	2R	1R	A	1R	F	3R	0 / 7	11–7	61%
Win–loss	0–0	0–1	0–1	9–3	4–3	1–3	10–4	0–1	4–3	16–4	10–4	0 / 27	54–27	67%
Career statistics
Titles	0	0	0	1	0	0	1	0	0	2	0	Career total: 4		
Finals	0	0	1	1	0	0	1	0	1	5	0	Career total: 9		
Year-end ranking	764	192	95	24	30	78	23	359	36	4		$12,892,510		

=== Grand Slam tournaments ===
==== Singles: 2 (2 runner-ups) ====
Result	Year	Tournament	Surface	Opponent	Score
Loss	2025	Wimbledon	Grass	(Poland) Iga Świątek	0–6, 0–6
Loss	2025	US Open	Hard	Aryna Sabalenka	3–6, 6–7^{(3–7)}

=== WTA 1000 tournaments ===
==== Singles: 3 (2 titles, 1 runner-up) ====
Result	Year	Tournament	Surface	Opponent	Score
Loss	2024	Canadian Open	Hard	(United States) Jessica Pegula	3–6, 6–2, 1–6
Win	2025	Qatar Ladies Open	Hard	(Latvia) Jeļena Ostapenko	6–4, 6–3
Win	2025	China Open	Hard	(Czech Republic) Linda Nosková	6–0, 2–6, 6–2
