= Diana Shnaider =

Russian tennis player (born 2004)

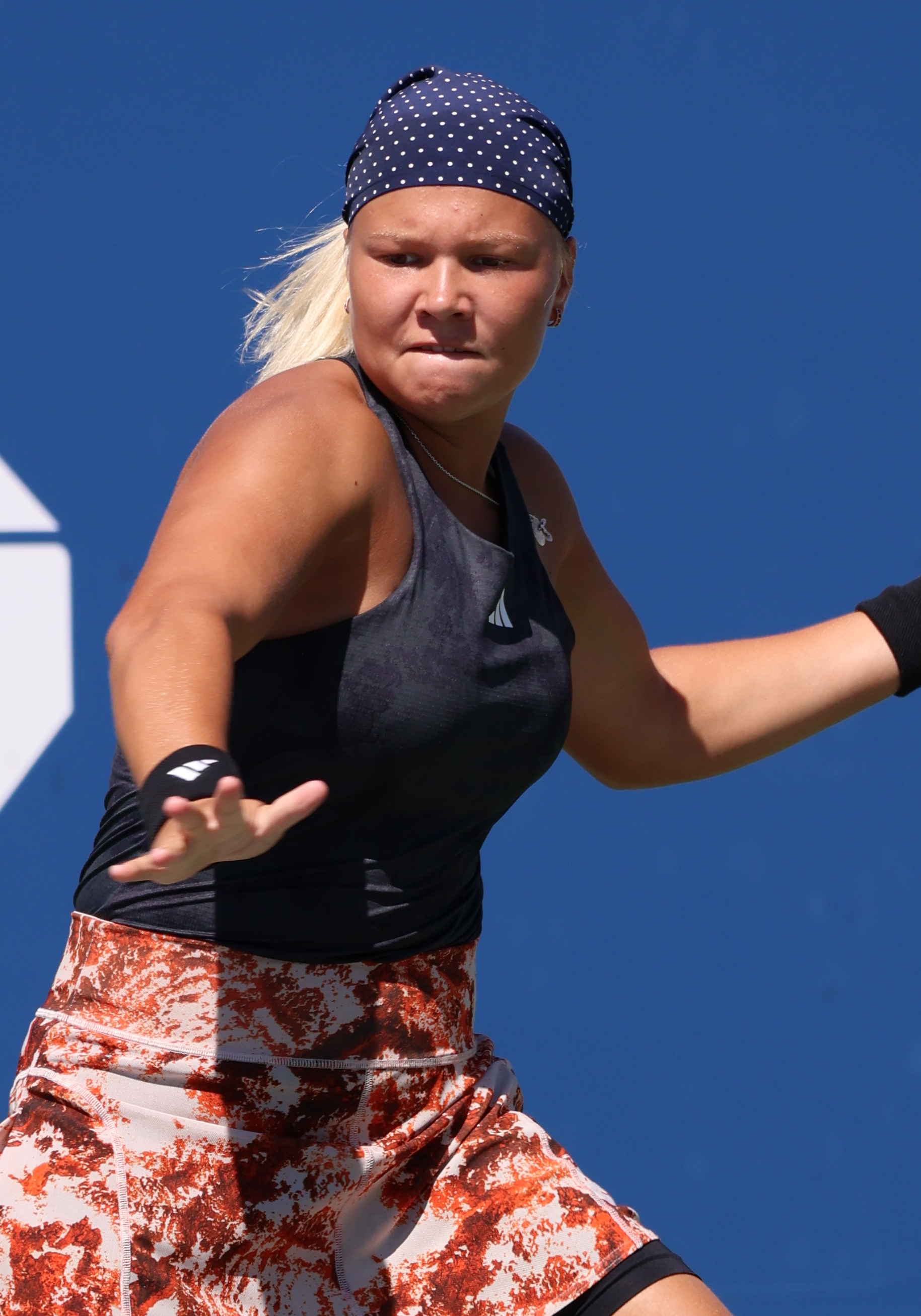
- Shnaider at the 2023 US Open
- Full name: Diana Maximovna Shnaider
- Country (sports): Russia
- Residence: Moscow, Russia
- Born: 2 April 2004 (age 22) Zhigulevsk, Russia
- Height: 1.70 m (5 ft 7 in)
- Turned pro: May 2023
- Plays: Left-handed (two-handed backhand)
- College: NC State
- Coach: Sascha Bajin (Aug 2025–)
- Prize money: $7,715,558

Singles
- Career record: 216–114
- Career titles: 6
- Highest ranking: No. 11 (5 May 2025)
- Current ranking: No. 11 (16 November 2026)

Grand Slam singles results
- Australian Open: 3R (2025, 2026)
- French Open: SF (2026)
- Wimbledon: 3R (2024)
- US Open: 4R (2024)

Other tournaments
- Tour Finals: RR (2026)
- Olympic Games: 2R (2024)

Doubles
- Career record: 102–65
- Career titles: 3
- Highest ranking: No. 8 (16 June 2025)
- Current ranking: No. 18 (16 November 2026)

Grand Slam doubles results
- Australian Open: SF (2025)
- French Open: SF (2025)
- Wimbledon: 3R (2025)
- US Open: SF (2026)

Grand Slam mixed doubles results
- US Open: QF (2026)
Medal record
Women's tennis
Representing Individual Neutral Athletes
Olympic Games
Silver medal – second place	2024 Paris	Doubles
- Last updated on: 19 November 2026.

Diana Maximovna Shnaider (Russian: Диа́на Макси́мовна Шна́йдер, pronounced [dʲɪˈanə mɐˈksʲiməvnə ˈʂnajdɨr]; born 2 April 2004) is a Russian professional tennis player. She has a career-high singles ranking by the WTA of No. 11, achieved on 5 May 2025, and a best doubles ranking of No. 8, reached on 16 June 2025.

Shnaider has won six singles titles and three doubles titles on the WTA Tour, and was a silver medalist in women's doubles at the 2024 Paris Olympics, with Mirra Andreeva.

== Early life ==
Shnaider was born in Zhigulevsk to father Maxim and mother Yulia. Her father is a lawyer and former boxer of German descent, while her mother is an English teacher. Her family later moved to Tolyatti.

She began playing tennis at the age of four. At the age of eight, she began pursuing the sport seriously, training with coach Samvel Minasyan in Moscow. In 2022, she moved to the United States and enrolled at North Carolina State University, where she played college tennis for the NC State Wolfpack.

Shnaider's signature on-court look features a colored bandanna. She began wearing headscarves as a child to prevent sunburn, preferring them over caps and visors.

== Juniors ==
Shnaider won the girl's doubles titles at the 2021 Wimbledon Championships, partnering Belarusian Kristina Dmitruk, and the 2022 Australian Open, partnering with American Clervie Ngounoue.

On the ITF Junior Circuit, Shnaider had a career-high combined ranking of No. 3, achieved on 13 December 2021.

=== Grand Slam performance ===
Singles:

- Australian Open: QF (2022)
- French Open: SF (2021)
- Wimbledon: 1R (2019, 2021)
- US Open: SF (2022)

Doubles:

- Australian Open: W (2022)
- French Open: F (2020)
- Wimbledon: W (2021)
- US Open: W (2022)

== Professional ==
=== 2022: First WTA 125 title ===
Shnaider won her first WTA 125 title at the Montevideo Open, defeating Léolia Jeanjean in straight sets in the final.

=== 2023: Major debut, WTA Tour final, top 60 ===
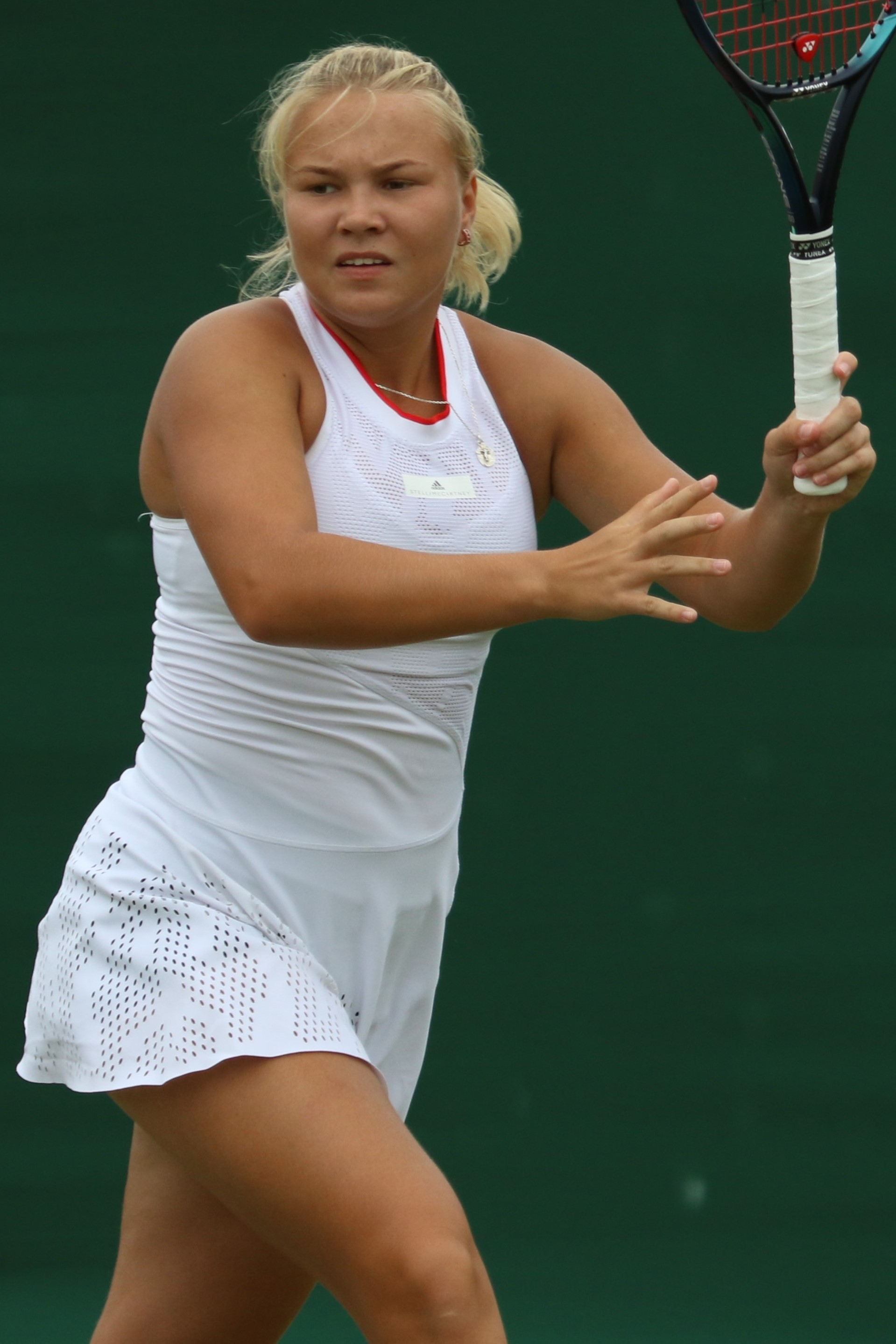
Shnaider at the 2023 Wimbledon qualifying

Shnaider made her Grand Slam tournament debut at the 2023 Australian Open after qualifying. She defeated Kristína Kučová for her first win at a major, before losing in the second round to sixth seed Maria Sakkari. As a result, she reached the top 100, at world No. 94, on 30 January 2023.

After the Australian Open, Shnaider played one season of college tennis for North Carolina State. She went 20–3 in singles to help the Wolfpack win the ACC tournament and reach the 2023 NCAA Championships final. She was named the ACC tournament's most valuable player and ACC Freshman of the Year and received first-team All-ACC and All-American honors in singles and doubles.

At the Budapest Grand Prix, she defeated top seed Bernarda Pera, but lost in the second round to lucky loser and eventual champion, Maria Timofeeva. Shnaider reached the semifinals at the Hamburg Open defeating third seed Bernarda Pera in the quarterfinals, before losing to home favorite, wildcard entrant Noma Noha Akugue.

In her debut on the Asian swing, she defeated eighth seed Claire Liu at the Guangzhou Open. She lost in the second round to Wang Xiyu At the next tournament, she reached the semifinals by beating second seed Petra Kvitová at the Ningbo Open. Next, she defeated Linda Fruhvirtová to reach her first WTA Tour final but lost to top seed Ons Jabeur. Following a semifinal showing at the Jiangxi Open, she reached the top 60 on 23 October 2023.

=== 2024: Four career titles, doubles Olympic silver, top 20 ===
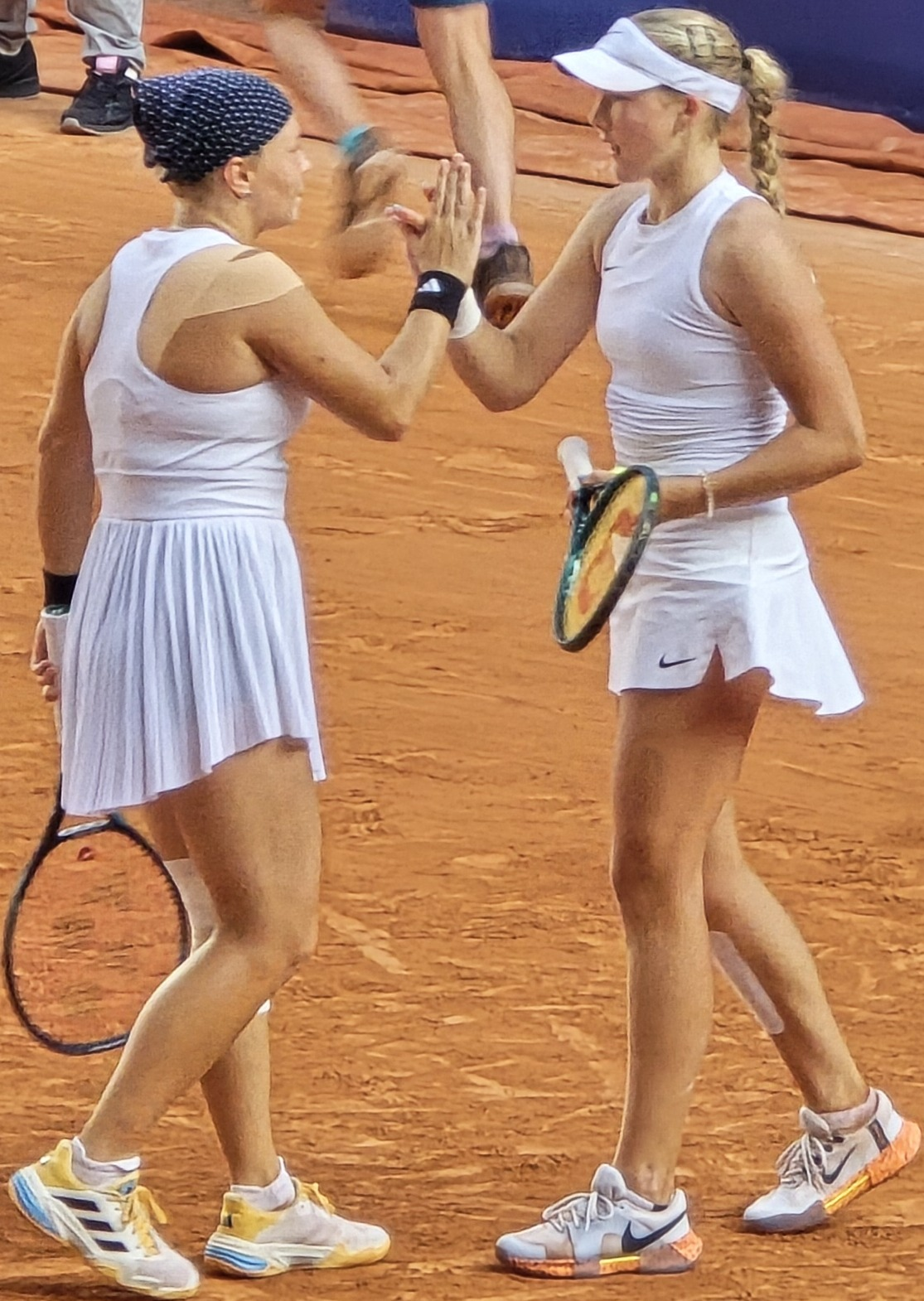
Shnaider with Mirra Andreeva at the 2024 Olympic doubles final

In Hua Hin, Thailand, she reached her fourth career quarterfinal, defeating top seed Magda Linette and Paula Badosa by retirement. Next, she defeated qualifier Dalma Gálfi and third seed Wang Xinyu to reach her second career final. Shnaider then defeated second seed Zhu Lin in three sets to win her first ever WTA Tour title. At the Miami Open, she lost in the second round to 17th seed Madison Keys.

She won her second career title at the 2024 Bad Homburg Open defeating Donna Vekić in the final. As a result, she reached the top 30 on 1 July 2024. On her Wimbledon debut, she advanced to the third round with wins over former finalist Karolína Plíšková and Sloane Stephens, before losing to 19th seed Emma Navarro.

Shnaider won her third title of the year at the Budapest Grand Prix, defeating Aliaksandra Sasnovich in straight sets in the final. Subsequently, she moved up to a career-high singles ranking No. 18 on 19 August 2024.

At the Paris Olympics, Shnaider partnered with Mirra Andreeva to win silver in the women's doubles, losing in the final to Sara Errani and Jasmine Paolini.

Seeded sixth at the Pan Pacific Open in October, she reached the semifinals with a win over Viktoriya Tomova along with a quarterfinal walkover against injured qualifier Sayaka Ishii. She lost in the last four to top seed and eventual champion Zheng Qinwen.

At the Hong Kong Open where she was top seed, Shnaider defeated qualifier Kyoka Okamura, Priscilla Hon, Suzan Lamens and defending champion and third seed Leylah Fernandez to reach the final where she overcame second seed Katie Boulter in straight sets to claim her fourth title of the season.

=== 2025: First WTA 1000 doubles title, fifth singles title ===
Partnering Mirra Andreeva, Shnaider won her first WTA Tour doubles title at the Brisbane International, defeating Priscilla Hon and Anna Kalinskaya in the final. The following week, at the Adelaide International, she lost in the quarterfinals to Yulia Putintseva. Seeded 12th at the Australian Open, she lost in three sets to Donna Vekić in the third round. In doubles, Shnaider and Mirra Andreeva avenged their Olympics final loss against Sara Errani and Jasmine Paolini in the second round before losing in the semifinials to top seeds and eventual champions Kateřina Siniaková and Taylor Townsend.

Again partnering with Andreeva, Shnaider won her first WTA 1000 doubles title at the Miami Open, defeating Cristina Bucșa and Miyu Kato in the final.

Seeded 13th at the Italian Open, she received a bye and then double bagelled Caroline Dolehide, before defeating Jaqueline Cristian and 25th seed Elise Mertens to reach the quarterfinals, at which point she lost to sixth seed and eventual champion, Jasmine Paolini. In the doubles, she and Andreeva lost to eventual champions Errani and Paolini in the semifinals.

Seeded 11th at French Open, Shnaider lost to Dayana Yastremska in the second round. In the doubles, she and Andreeva again lost to eventual champions Errani and Paolini at the semifinal stage.

In June, Shnaider recorded wins over Magdalena Fręch and Katie Boulter to make it through to the quarterfinals at the Queen's Club Championships. She lost to second seed Madison Keys in the last eight. In doubles, she and Anna Danilina lost in the final to Asia Muhammad and Demi Schuurs. Seeded 12th at Wimbledon, Shnaider lost in the second round to qualifier Diane Parry.

As third seed at the Monterrey Open, she received a first-round bye and then defeated Kamilla Rakhimova, fifth seed Mertens and Alycia Parks to reach the final. Shnaider overcame second seed Ekaterina Alexandrova in the championship match to claim her fifth WTA Tour singles title. Seeded 20th at the US Open, she was upset by Laura Siegemund in the first round.

In October at the Ningbo Open, wins against Wang Xiyu, Karolína Muchová and Zhu Lin saw her make it into the semifinals, where her run was ended by fourth seed Alexandrova.

Shnaider and Mirra Andreeva qualified for the doubles event at the end of season WTA Finals in Riyadh, but were eliminated in the group stage.

=== 2026: Maiden major singles semifinal, sixth singles title ===
Seeded ninth, Shnaider reached the semifinals at the Adelaide International, registering wins over Leylah Fernandez, Kateřina Siniaková and sixth seed Emma Navarro, before losing to her former doubles partner, third seed and eventual champion, Mirra Andreeva, in the last four. Seeded 23rd at the Australian Open, she lost in the third round to 12th seed Elina Svitolina.

At the Charleston Open, she received a bye in the first round due to being seventh seed and then defeated Katie Volynets and ninth seed Leylah Fernandez to make it through to the quarterfinals, at which point she lost to top seed and defending champion Jessica Pegula in three sets.

Reunited with Andreeva, Shnaider made it into the doubles final at the Madrid Open. They lost to second seeds Kateřina Siniaková and Taylor Townsend, in straight sets. At the Italian Open, she again teamed up with Andreeva to win their second WTA 1000 doubles title as a partnership, defeating seventh seeds Cristina Bucșa and Nicole Melichar-Martinez in the final.

Seeded 25th at the French Open, Shnaider defeated 19th seed Madison Keys in the fourth round to advance to her first major quarterfinal. After trailing 6–3, 4–1, she won 12 of the final 13 games to overcome world No. 1, Aryna Sabalenka, in three sets in the quarterfinals to reach her first major semifinal. However, she was defeated there in straight sets by qualifier and eventual finalist, Maja Chwalińska. At Wimbledon she lost to Liudmila Samsonova in the second round.

Moving onto the North American hardcourt swing of the season, Shnaider reached the semifinals at the Washington Open losing to third seed Jessica Pegula. The following week at the Canadian Open, she turned the tables on Pegula defeating her en route to the quarterfinals, at which point her run was ended by seventh seed Iga Świątek. As the 15th seed at the US Open, Shnaider lost in the third round to Taylor Townsend.

In October at the Wuhan Open, she defeated world No. 7, Karolína Muchová, en route to the quarterfinals where she lost to Jeļena Ostapenko. The following week, Shnaider went one stage better by reaching the semifinals at the Ningbo Open, losing to world No. 1 Elena Rybakina. Seeded third at the Pan Pacific Open, she defeated qualifier Aliaksandra Sasnovich, eighth seed Alexandra Eala and Mia Pohánková to make it into her first final of the year, where she overcame Leylah Fernandez in three sets to win her sixth WTA Tour singles title. Two weeks later, Shnaider made her debut at the season ending WTA Finals as an alternate replacing Karolina Muchova who withdrew during the round-robin stage because of illness. She lost her only match to Mirra Andreea.

== Career statistics ==
=== Grand Slam singles performance timeline ===
Current through the 2026 US Open.

Tournament	2023	2024	2025	2026	SR	W–L	Win %
Australian Open	2R	1R	3R	3R	0 / 4	5–4	56%
French Open	2R	1R	2R	SF	0 / 4	7–4	64%
Wimbledon	Q2	3R	2R	2R	0 / 3	4–3	57%
US Open	Q2	4R	1R	3R	0 / 3	5–3	63%
Win–loss	2–2	5–4	4–4	10–4	0 / 14	21–14	60%

=== Olympic medal matches ===
==== Doubles: 1 (silver medal) ====
Result	Year	Tournament	Surface	Partner	Opponents	Score
Silver	2024	Paris Summer Olympics	Clay	Mirra Andreeva	(Italy) Sara Errani (Italy) Jasmine Paolini	6–2, 1–6, [7–10]

=== WTA 1000 finals ===
==== Doubles: 3 (2 titles, 1 runner-up) ====
Result	Year	Tournament	Surface	Partner	Opponents	Score
Win	2025	Miami Open	Hard	Mirra Andreeva	(Spain) Cristina Bucșa (Japan) Miyu Kato	6–3, 6–7^{(5–7)}, [10–2]
Loss	2026	Madrid Open	Clay	Mirra Andreeva	(Czech Republic) Kateřina Siniaková (United States) Taylor Townsend	6–7^{(2–7)}, 2–6
Win	2026	Italian Open	Clay	Mirra Andreeva	(Spain) Cristina Bucșa (United States) Nicole Melichar-Martinez	6–3, 6–3

Sporting positions
Preceded by (United States) Reese Brantmeier / (United States) Kimmi Hance	Orange Bowl Girls' Doubles Champion; 2021; With: (Croatia) Petra Marčinko	Succeeded by (United States) Tyra Caterina Grant / (United States) Iva Jovic
