= 2023 Credit One Charleston Open – Singles =

Singles
- 2023 Credit One Charleston Open

Final
- Champion: (Tunisia) Ons Jabeur
- Runner-up: (Switzerland) Belinda Bencic
- Score: 7–6^{(8–6)}, 6–4

Details
- Draw: 56 (4WC, 1PR, 8Q)
- Seeds: 16

Events
Singles	Doubles
← 2022 ·	Charleston Open	· 2024 →

Ons Jabeur defeated the defending champion Belinda Bencic in a rematch of the previous year's final, 7–6^{(8–6)}, 6–4 to win the singles tennis title at the 2023 Charleston Open. Jabeur did not drop a set en route to her fourth career singles title and first of the season.

This was the first tournament on the WTA Tour since the 2018 Italian Open where both finalists contested the final in consecutive years. This would be repeated just 2 weeks later at the Stuttgart Open. Jabeur had lost two consecutive finals in Daniel Island (the second 2021 and 2022) before finally winning the 2023 tournament.

The top four seeds reached the semifinals for the first time since 2000, and for the first time at a WTA 500 tournament since the 2012 Porsche Tennis Grand Prix - Singles.

== Seeds ==
The top eight seeds received a bye into the second round.

1. (United States) Jessica Pegula (semifinals)
2. (Tunisia) Ons Jabeur (champion)
3. Daria Kasatkina (semifinals)
4. (Switzerland) Belinda Bencic (final)
5. Veronika Kudermetova (second round)
6. Victoria Azarenka (third round)
7. Ekaterina Alexandrova (quarterfinals)
8. (Poland) Magda Linette (third round)
9. (United States) Madison Keys (quarterfinals)
10. (China) Zhang Shuai (first round)
11. (Ukraine) Anhelina Kalinina (first round)
12. (Spain) Paula Badosa (quarterfinals)
13. (United States) Danielle Collins (first round)
14. (Switzerland) Jil Teichmann (first round)
15. (Romania) Irina-Camelia Begu (third round)
16. (Czech Republic) Marie Bouzková (first round)

Click on the seed number of a player to go to their draw section.

== Draw ==
=== Key ===
- Q = Qualifier
- WC = Wild card
- LL = Lucky loser
- Alt = Alternate
- SE = Special exempt
- PR = Protected ranking
- ITF = ITF entry
- JE = Junior exempt
- w/o = Walkover
- r = Retired
- d = Defaulted
- SR = Special ranking

=== Finals ===
Quarterfinals
1	(United States) Jessica Pegula	6	7^{8}
12	(Spain) Paula Badosa	3	6^{6}
4	(Switzerland) Belinda Bencic	6	6
7	Ekaterina Alexandrova	3	3
9	(United States) Madison Keys	7^{7}	4	2
3	Daria Kasatkina	6^{5}	6	6
Anna Kalinskaya	0	1^{r}
2	(Tunisia) Ons Jabeur	6	4

Semifinals
1	(United States) Jessica Pegula	5	6^{5}
4	(Switzerland) Belinda Bencic	7	7^{7}
3	Daria Kasatkina	5	5
2	(Tunisia) Ons Jabeur	7	7

Final
4	(Switzerland) Belinda Bencic	6^{6}	4
2	(Tunisia) Ons Jabeur	7^{8}	6

=== Top half ===
==== Section 1 ====
First round
(Hungary) A Bondár	6^{7}	2
A Blinkova	7^{9}	6
A Sasnovich	1	7^{7}	1
WC	(United States) S Kenin	6	6^{5}	6
(Hungary) D Gálfi	1	5
15	(Romania) I-C Begu	6	7
12	(Spain) P Badosa	6	6
(Egypt) M Sherif	3	1
(Canada) L Fernandez	6	6
PR	E Rodina	3	2
(United States) A Parks	4	3
D Shnaider	6	6

Second round
1	(United States) J Pegula	6	6
A Blinkova	2	0
WC	(United States) S Kenin	1	4
15	(Romania) I-C Begu	6	6
12	(Spain) P Badosa	7	7^{8}
(Canada) L Fernandez	5	6^{6}
D Shnaider	6	6
5	V Kudermetova	4	3

Third round
1	(United States) J Pegula	7	4	6
15	(Romania) I-C Begu	5	6	4
12	(Spain) P Badosa	6	6
D Shnaider	1	3

Quarterfinals
1	(United States) J Pegula	6	7^{8}
12	(Spain) P Badosa	3	6^{6}

==== Section 2 ====
First round
(United States) L Davis	6	1	2
Q	(Canada) K Sebov	4	6	6
(United States) C McNally	6	6
(Germany) J Niemeier	4	1
(United States) S Rogers	6^{2}	6	6
13	(United States) D Collins	7^{7}	4	1
10	(China) S Zhang	4	6	3
(Austria) J Grabher	6	1	6
Q	(United States) K Day	4	2
Q	(United States) S Vickery	6	6
WC	(Ukraine) E Svitolina	7^{7}	2	4
(Kazakhstan) Y Putintseva	6^{3}	6	6

Second round
4	(Switzerland) B Bencic	6	6
Q	(Canada) K Sebov	0	3
(United States) C McNally	7^{7}	5	1
(United States) S Rogers	6^{4}	7	6
(Austria) J Grabher	6	6
Q	(United States) S Vickery	1	2
(Kazakhstan) Y Putintseva	1	3
7	E Alexandrova	6	6

Third round
4	(Switzerland) B Bencic	4	7	6
(United States) S Rogers	6	5	2
(Austria) J Grabher	4	2
7	E Alexandrova	6	6

Quarterfinals
4	(Switzerland) B Bencic	6	6
7	E Alexandrova	3	3

=== Bottom half ===
==== Section 3 ====
First round
Q	(Germany) A-L Friedsam	6^{3}	2
V Gracheva	7^{7}	6
(China) Xiy Wang	3	3
Q	(United States) H Baptiste	6	6
WC	(United States) E Navarro	4	3
9	(United States) M Keys	6	6
16	(Czech Republic) M Bouzková	5	7^{7}	1
(Spain) C Bucșa	7	6^{3}	6
(United States) C Liu	4	7^{7}	3
(United States) B Pera	6	6^{1}	6
(Estonia) K Kanepi	3	4
(United States) M Brengle	6	6

Second round
8	(Poland) M Linette	6^{3}	7	6
V Gracheva	7^{7}	5	4
Q	(United States) H Baptiste	1	2
9	(United States) M Keys	6	6
(Spain) C Bucșa	3	4
(United States) B Pera	6	6
(United States) M Brengle	2	1
3	D Kasatkina	6	6

Third round
8	(Poland) M Linette	2	6	1
9	(United States) M Keys	6	3	6
(United States) B Pera	3	6^{3}
3	D Kasatkina	6	7^{7}

Quarterfinals
9	(United States) M Keys	7^{7}	4	2
3	D Kasatkina	6^{5}	6	6

==== Section 4 ====
First round
(United States) S Stephens	3	6	6
Q	(United States) L Chirico	6	1	2
WC	(United States) F Crawley	0	2
(France) A Cornet	6	6
A Kalinskaya	7^{8}	6
11	(Ukraine) A Kalinina	6^{6}	4
14	(Switzerland) J Teichmann	2	6	2
(Czech Republic) L Fruhvirtová	6	3	6
WC	(United States) C Dolehide	6	6
Q	(Germany) S Lisicki	4	4
(Ukraine) L Tsurenko	6	6
Q	(Argentina) P Ormaechea	1	1

Second round
6	V Azarenka	3	6	6
(United States) S Stephens	6	3	2
(France) A Cornet	6^{4}	6	2
A Kalinskaya	7^{7}	4	6
(Czech Republic) L Fruhvirtová	2	7	3
WC	(United States) C Dolehide	6	5	6
(Ukraine) L Tsurenko	3	3
2	(Tunisia) O Jabeur	6	6

Third round
6	V Azarenka	4	6^{5}
A Kalinskaya	6	7^{7}
WC	(United States) C Dolehide	3	5
2	(Tunisia) O Jabeur	6	7

Quarterfinals
A Kalinskaya	0	1^{r}
2	(Tunisia) O Jabeur	6	4

== Qualifying ==
=== Seeds ===
1. (Germany) Tamara Korpatsch (first round)
2. (Germany) Anna-Lena Friedsam (qualified)
3. (Poland) Magdalena Fręch (qualifying competition)
4. (Germany) Laura Siegemund (first round)
5. (Switzerland) Viktorija Golubic (first round)
6. (United States) Taylor Townsend (withdrew, still competing in Miami)
7. (United States) CoCo Vandeweghe (first round)
8. (France) Kristina Mladenovic (first round)
9. (United States) Elizabeth Mandlik (first round)
10. (United Kingdom) Heather Watson (qualifying competition)
11. (United States) Ashlyn Krueger (qualifying competition)
12. (United States) Louisa Chirico (qualified)
13. (Argentina) Paula Ormaechea (qualified)
14. (Canada) Katherine Sebov (qualified)
15. (United Kingdom) Yuriko Miyazaki (first round)
16. (United States) Kayla Day (qualified)

=== Qualifiers ===
1. (United States) Kayla Day
2. (Germany) Anna-Lena Friedsam
3. (Argentina) Paula Ormaechea
4. (United States) Sachia Vickery
5. (Germany) Sabine Lisicki
6. (United States) Hailey Baptiste
7. (United States) Louisa Chirico
8. (Canada) Katherine Sebov

=== Draw ===
==== First qualifier ====
First round
1	(Germany) Tamara Korpatsch	6	2	1
(United States) Ann Li	2	6	6
(Romania) Gabriela Lee	2	6^{5}
16	(United States) Kayla Day	6	7^{7}

Qualifying competition
(United States) Ann Li	2	4
16	(United States) Kayla Day	6	6

==== Second qualifier ====
First round
2	(Germany) Anna-Lena Friedsam	7^{7}	4	6
WC	(United States) Liv Hovde	6^{4}	6	2
(United States) Asia Muhammad	6^{6}	6	6
9	(United States) Elizabeth Mandlik	7^{8}	4	2

Qualifying competition
2	(Germany) Anna-Lena Friedsam	6	3	6
(United States) Asia Muhammad	1	6	3

==== Third qualifier ====
First round
3	(Poland) Magdalena Fręch	6	6
(Israel) Lina Glushko	1	2
(United States) Jamie Loeb	3	4
13	(Argentina) Paula Ormaechea	6	6

Qualifying competition
3	(Poland) Magdalena Fręch	3	6	6^{3}
13	(Argentina) Paula Ormaechea	6	1	7^{7}

==== Fourth qualifier ====
First round
4	(Germany) Laura Siegemund	2	7^{7}	3
(United States) Sachia Vickery	6	6^{4}	6
(United States) Robin Montgomery	2	6^{5}
11	(United States) Ashlyn Krueger	6	7^{7}

Qualifying competition
(United States) Sachia Vickery	3	6	6
11	(United States) Ashlyn Krueger	6	1	2

==== Fifth qualifier ====
First round
5	(Switzerland) Viktorija Golubic	2	6	2
(Poland) Katarzyna Kawa	6	3	6
WC	(Germany) Sabine Lisicki	6	7^{7}
15	(United Kingdom) Yuriko Miyazaki	1	6^{5}

Qualifying competition
(Poland) Katarzyna Kawa	7^{7}	6^{1}	3
WC	(Germany) Sabine Lisicki	6^{1}	7^{7}	6

==== Sixth qualifier ====
First round
Alt	(United States) Hailey Baptiste	6	6
(Mexico) Marcela Zacarías	2	1
WC	(United States) Maria Mateas	7^{7}	4	4
10	(United Kingdom) Heather Watson	6^{3}	6	6

Qualifying competition
Alt	(United States) Hailey Baptiste	7	6
10	(United Kingdom) Heather Watson	5	3

==== Seventh qualifier ====
First round
7	(United States) CoCo Vandeweghe	1	2
(United States) Elvina Kalieva	6	6
(United States) Sophie Chang	6^{5}	3
12	(United States) Louisa Chirico	7^{7}	6

Qualifying competition
(United States) Elvina Kalieva	4	1
12	(United States) Louisa Chirico	6	6

==== Eighth qualifier ====
First round
8	(France) Kristina Mladenovic	6	4	3
WC	(United States) Francesca Di Lorenzo	3	6	6
(Brazil) Gabriela Cé	2	1
14	(Canada) Katherine Sebov	6	6

Qualifying competition
WC	(United States) Francesca Di Lorenzo	4	2
14	(Canada) Katherine Sebov	6	6
