= 2022 Credit One Charleston Open – Singles =

Singles
- 2022 Credit One Charleston Open

Final
- Champion: (Switzerland) Belinda Bencic
- Runner-up: (Tunisia) Ons Jabeur
- Score: 6–1, 5–7, 6–4

Details
- Draw: 56 (4WC, 1PR, 8Q)
- Seeds: 16

Events
Singles	Doubles
← 2021 ·	Charleston Open	· 2023 →

Belinda Bencic defeated Ons Jabeur in the final, 6–1, 5–7, 6–4, to win the singles tennis title at the 2022 Charleston Open. Her victory made her the first Swiss player to win the title since Martina Hingis in 1999 and earned her the distinction of holding titles across all three major surfaces.

Veronika Kudermetova was the defending champion, but she withdrew before the tournament began.

== Seeds ==
The top eight seeds received a bye into the second round.

1. Aryna Sabalenka (third round)
2. (Spain) Paula Badosa (quarterfinals)
3. (Czech Republic) Karolína Plíšková (third round)
4. (Tunisia) Ons Jabeur (final)
5. (Kazakhstan) Elena Rybakina (second round)
6. (United States) Jessica Pegula (third round)
7. (Canada) Leylah Fernandez (second round)
8. Veronika Kudermetova (withdrew)

9. (United States) Madison Keys (third round)
10. (Switzerland) Belinda Bencic (champion)
11. (Czech Republic) Petra Kvitová (first round, retired)
12. (France) Alizé Cornet (third round)
13. (United States) Sloane Stephens (first round)
14. (Australia) Ajla Tomljanović (second round)
15. (United States) Amanda Anisimova (semifinals)
16. (China) Zhang Shuai (second round)

== Draw ==
=== Key ===
- Q = Qualifier
- WC = Wild card
- LL = Lucky loser
- Alt = Alternate
- ITF = ITF entry
- PR = Protected ranking
- SR = Special ranking
- SE = Special exempt
- JE = Junior exempt
- JR = Junior Accelerator Programme entrant
- CO = College Accelerator Programme entrant
- NG = Next Gen Accelerator Program entrant
- w/o = Walkover
- r = Retired
- d = Defaulted

=== Finals ===
Quarterfinals
15	(United States) Amanda Anisimova	6	6
LL	(United States) CoCo Vandeweghe	1	2
4	(Tunisia) Ons Jabeur	6	6
(Ukraine) Anhelina Kalinina	3	2
(Poland) Magda Linette	0	2
Ekaterina Alexandrova	6	6
10	(Switzerland) Belinda Bencic	2	7^{7}	6
2	(Spain) Paula Badosa	6	6^{2}	4

Semifinals
15	(United States) Amanda Anisimova	6	1	4
4	(Tunisia) Ons Jabeur	2	6	6
Ekaterina Alexandrova	4	3
10	(Switzerland) Belinda Bencic	6	6

Final
4	(Tunisia) Ons Jabeur	1	7	4
10	(Switzerland) Belinda Bencic	6	5	6

=== Top half ===
==== Section 1 ====
First round
(United States) A Riske	7	6
WC	(United States) C McNally	5	3
(Kazakhstan) Y Putintseva	6	7^{11}
Q	(United States) R Anderson	2	6^{9}
Q	(United States) S Vickery	0	5
15	(United States) A Anisimova	6	7
LL	(United States) C Vandeweghe	6	4	6
A Gasanova	3	6	3
(Georgia (country)) M Bolkvadze	2	3
(United States) L Davis	6	6
Q	(Romania) G Lee	2	3
(Italy) J Paolini	6	6

Second round
1/WC	A Sabalenka	7^{7}	6
(United States) A Riske	6^{3}	4
(Kazakhstan) Y Putintseva	1	2
15	(United States) A Anisimova	6	6
LL	(United States) C Vandeweghe	3	6	6
(United States) L Davis	6	3	3
(Italy) J Paolini	2	1
6	(United States) J Pegula	6	6

Third Round
1/WC	A Sabalenka	6	4	3
15	(United States) A Anisimova	3	6	6
LL	(United States) C Vandeweghe	6	3	6
6	(United States) J Pegula	4	6	4

Quarterfinals
15	(United States) A Anisimova	6	6
LL	(United States) C Vandeweghe	1	2

==== Section 2 ====
First round
WC	(United States) E Navarro	6^{4}	6	3
(United States) M Brengle	7^{7}	2	0^{r}
(China) Xin Wang	6^{2}	4
(Romania) I-C Begu	7^{7}	6
Q	(United States) S Chang	5	4
14	(Australia) A Tomljanović	7	6
12	(France) A Cornet	6	7
(United States) A Parks	0	5
(Romania) E-G Ruse	3	0
(United States) H Baptiste	6	6
A Sasnovich	4	4
(Ukraine) A Kalinina	6	6

Second round
4	(Tunisia) O Jabeur	6	6
WC	(United States) E Navarro	3	2
(Romania) I-C Begu	6	6
14	(Australia) A Tomljanović	2	3
12	(France) A Cornet	6	6
(United States) H Baptiste	3	2
(Ukraine) A Kalinina	6	2	6
5	(Kazakhstan) E Rybakina	4	6	4

Third Round
4	(Tunisia) O Jabeur	6	6
(Romania) I-C Begu	3	2
12	(France) A Cornet	6^{5}	5
(Ukraine) A Kalinina	7^{7}	7

Quarterfinals
4	(Tunisia) O Jabeur	6	6
(Ukraine) A Kalinina	3	2

=== Bottom half ===
==== Section 3 ====
First round
(Poland) M Linette	4	6	7^{7}
(United States) K Volynets	6	3	6^{4}
(United States) S Rogers	7^{7}	5	2
(Estonia) K Kanepi	6^{2}	7	6
(Poland) M Fręch	7^{8}	3
11	(Czech Republic) P Kvitová	6^{6}	2^{r}
13	(United States) S Stephens	3	6	0
(China) Q Zheng	6	4	6
Q	(United States) A Kiick	1	1
E Alexandrova	6	6
PR	(Ukraine) K Zavatska	6	6
(China) Y Yuan	4	2

Second round
7	(Canada) L Fernandez	6	3	4
(Poland) M Linette	3	6	6
(Estonia) K Kanepi	7	6
(Poland) M Fręch	5	3
(China) Q Zheng	6	5	2^{r}
E Alexandrova	2	7	5
PR	(Ukraine) K Zavatska	7	5	4
3	(Czech Republic) Ka Plíšková	5	7	6

Third Round
(Poland) M Linette	6	4	6
(Estonia) K Kanepi	3	6	2
E Alexandrova	6	6
3	(Czech Republic) Ka Plíšková	3	1

Quarterfinals
(Poland) M Linette	0	2
E Alexandrova	6	6

==== Section 4 ====
First round
Q	(Norway) U Eikeri	5	6	6
Q	(Ukraine) N Kichenok	7	2	2
(Croatia) A Konjuh	6	1	3
WC	(Czech Republic) L Fruhvirtová	4	6	6
(China) Xiy Wang	6	6^{5}	3
10	(Switzerland) B Bencic	4	7^{7}	6
16	(China) S Zhang	6	6
Q	(United States) F Di Lorenzo	2	4
LL	(United Kingdom) H Watson	4	2
(United States) C Liu	6	6
(Netherlands) A Hartono	1	4
(Hungary) A Bondár	6	6

Second round
9	(United States) M Keys	6	6
Q	(Norway) U Eikeri	3	1
WC	(Czech Republic) L Fruhvirtová	1	6^{6}
10	(Switzerland) B Bencic	6	7^{8}
16	(China) S Zhang	5	6	4
(United States) C Liu	7	2	6
(Hungary) A Bondár	1	4
2	(Spain) P Badosa	6	6

Third Round
9	(United States) M Keys	4	4
10	(Switzerland) B Bencic	6	6
(United States) C Liu	6	6^{8}	1
2	(Spain) P Badosa	3	7^{10}	6

Quarterfinals
10	(Switzerland) B Bencic	2	7^{7}	6
2	(Spain) P Badosa	6	6^{2}	4

== Qualifying ==
=== Seeds ===
1. (United Kingdom) Heather Watson (qualifying competition, lucky loser)
2. (United States) Christina McHale (first round)
3. (United States) CoCo Vandeweghe (qualifying competition, lucky loser)
4. (United States) Robin Anderson (qualified)
5. (United States) Caroline Dolehide (first round)
6. (United States) Grace Min (qualifying competition)
7. (United States) Jamie Loeb (qualifying competition)
8. (United States) Francesca Di Lorenzo (qualified)
9. (Mexico) Marcela Zacarías (first round)
10. (United States) Sachia Vickery (qualified)
11. (Romania) Gabriela Lee (qualified)
12. (United States) Whitney Osuigwe (first round)
13. (United States) Allie Kiick (qualified)
14. (United States) Catherine Harrison (qualifying competition)
15. (Norway) Ulrikke Eikeri (qualified)
16. (Canada) Carol Zhao (qualifying competition)

=== Qualifiers ===
1. (Norway) Ulrikke Eikeri
2. (Ukraine) Nadiia Kichenok
3. (Romania) Gabriela Lee
4. (United States) Robin Anderson
5. (United States) Sophie Chang
6. (United States) Sachia Vickery
7. (United States) Allie Kiick
8. (United States) Francesca Di Lorenzo

=== Lucky losers ===
1. (United Kingdom) Heather Watson
2. (United States) CoCo Vandeweghe

=== Qualifying draw ===
==== First qualifier ====
First round
1	(United Kingdom) Heather Watson	6	6
Alt	(United States) Elizabeth Halbauer	3	1
Alt	(Netherlands) Demi Schuurs	1	0
15	(Norway) Ulrikke Eikeri	6	6

Qualifying competition
1	(United Kingdom) Heather Watson	4	4
15	(Norway) Ulrikke Eikeri	6	6

==== Second qualifier ====
First round
2	(United States) Christina McHale	3	6	4
Alt	(Ukraine) Nadiia Kichenok	6	4	6
WC	(Canada) Bianca Fernandez	3	1
14	(United States) Catherine Harrison	6	6

Qualifying competition
Alt	(Ukraine) Nadiia Kichenok	6	6
14	(United States) Catherine Harrison	1	0

==== Third qualifier ====
First round
3	(United States) CoCo Vandeweghe	7	6
WC	(United States) Jessie Aney	5	0
(United States) Ellie Douglas	6^{5}	4
11	(Romania) Gabriela Lee	7^{7}	6

Qualifying competition
3	(United States) CoCo Vandeweghe	3	2
11	(Romania) Gabriela Lee	6	6

==== Fourth qualifier ====
First round
4	(United States) Robin Anderson	2	6	6
(United States) Elvina Kalieva	6	1	4
Alt	(Chinese Taipei) Chan Hao-ching	6^{3}	6^{2}
16	(Canada) Carol Zhao	7^{7}	7^{7}

Qualifying competition
4	(United States) Robin Anderson	6	6
16	(Canada) Carol Zhao	3	1

==== Fifth qualifier ====
First round
5	(United States) Caroline Dolehide	3	6	3
(United States) Louisa Chirico	6	3	6
(United States) Sophie Chang	7	6
12	(United States) Whitney Osuigwe	5	3

Qualifying competition
(United States) Louisa Chirico	6^{6}	2
(United States) Sophie Chang	7^{8}	6

==== Sixth qualifier ====
First round
6	(United States) Grace Min	6	6
(Georgia (country)) Sofia Shapatava	2	1
WC	(Serbia) Katarina Jokić	3	1
10	(United States) Sachia Vickery	6	6

Qualifying competition
6	(United States) Grace Min	3	1
10	(United States) Sachia Vickery	6	6

==== Seventh qualifier ====
First round
7	(United States) Jamie Loeb	6	6
WC	(United States) Alexa Graham	3	4
Alt	(United States) Desirae Krawczyk	6	5	3
13	(United States) Allie Kiick	2	7	6

Qualifying competition
7	(United States) Jamie Loeb	4	1
13	(United States) Allie Kiick	6	6

==== Eighth qualifier ====
First round
8	(United States) Francesca Di Lorenzo	6	6
Alt	(Slovakia) Tereza Mihalíková	2	0
Alt	(Ukraine) Lyudmyla Kichenok	6^{4}	7^{7}	6
9	(Mexico) Marcela Zacarías	7^{7}	6^{3}	2

Qualifying competition
8	(United States) Francesca Di Lorenzo	6^{3}	6	6
Alt	(Ukraine) Lyudmyla Kichenok	7^{7}	4	4
