= 2021 Volvo Car Open – Singles =

Singles
- 2021 Volvo Car Open

Final
- Champion: (Russia) Veronika Kudermetova
- Runner-up: (Montenegro) Danka Kovinić
- Score: 6–4, 6–2

Details
- Draw: 56
- Seeds: 16

Events
| Singles | Doubles |
| ← 2019 · | Charleston Open | · 2022 → |

Veronika Kudermetova defeated Danka Kovinić in the final, 6–4, 6–2, to win the singles tennis title at the 2021 Charleston Open. Kudermetova did not drop a set en route to her first career Women's Tennis Association (WTA) singles title.

Madison Keys was the defending champion, but she lost in the second round to Sloane Stephens in a rematch of the previous tournament's quarterfinal. As all losing quarterfinalists were previous WTA title holders, all four semifinalists were in contention to become a maiden WTA champion.

== Seeds ==
The top eight seeds received a bye into the second round.

1. (Australia) Ashleigh Barty (quarterfinals)
2. (United States) Sofia Kenin (second round)
3. (Czech Republic) Petra Kvitová (third round)
4. (Netherlands) Kiki Bertens (withdrew)
5. (Switzerland) Belinda Bencic (second round)
6. (Spain) Garbiñe Muguruza (third round, retired)
7. (Belgium) Elise Mertens (second round)
8. (United States) Madison Keys (second round)
9. (Czech Republic) Markéta Vondroušová (withdrew)
10. (Kazakhstan) Elena Rybakina (first round, retired)
11. (Kazakhstan) Yulia Putintseva (quarterfinals)
12. (Tunisia) Ons Jabeur (semifinals)
13. (United States) Amanda Anisimova (second round)
14. (United States) Coco Gauff (quarterfinals)
15. (Russia) Veronika Kudermetova (champion)
16. (China) Zhang Shuai (first round)
17. (Czech Republic) Marie Bouzková (second round)

Click on the seed number of a player to go to their draw section.

== Draw ==
=== Key ===
- Q = Qualifier
- WC = Wild card
- LL = Lucky loser
- Alt = Alternate
- SE = Special exempt
- PR = Protected ranking
- ITF = ITF entry
- JE = Junior exempt
- w/o = Walkover
- r = Retired
- d = Defaulted
- SR = Special ranking

=== Finals ===
Quarterfinals
1 | (Australia) Ashleigh Barty | 4 | 3
(Spain) Paula Badosa | 6 | 6
15 | (Russia) Veronika Kudermetova | 6 | 6
(United States) Sloane Stephens | 3 | 4
11 | (Kazakhstan) Yulia Putintseva | 7^{7} | 5 | 1
(Montenegro) Danka Kovinić | 6^{2} | 7 | 6
12 | (Tunisia) Ons Jabeur | 6 | 6
14 | (United States) Coco Gauff | 3 | 3

Semifinals
(Spain) Paula Badosa | 3 | 3
15 | (Russia) Veronika Kudermetova | 6 | 6
(Montenegro) Danka Kovinić | 6 | 6
12 | (Tunisia) Ons Jabeur | 3 | 2

Final
15 | (Russia) Veronika Kudermetova | 6 | 6
(Montenegro) Danka Kovinić | 4 | 2

=== Top half ===
==== Section 1 ====
First round
(Japan) M Doi | 6 | 6
PR | (Kazakhstan) Y Shvedova | 3 | 3
(France) K Mladenovic | 4 | 3
(United States) S Rogers | 6 | 6
(Poland) M Linette | 7 | 2 | 3
13 | (United States) A Anisimova | 5 | 6 | 6
10 | (Kazakhstan) E Rybakina | 4 | 0^{r}
(United States) C McNally | 6 | 0
(Latvia) A Sevastova | 6 | 6
PR | (Russia) A Potapova | 3 | 3
(Russia) V Gracheva | 6 | 5 | 1
(Spain) P Badosa | 3 | 7 | 6

Second round
1 | (Australia) A Barty | 6 | 6
(Japan) M Doi | 2 | 1
(United States) S Rogers | 1 | 7 | 6
13 | (United States) A Anisimova | 6 | 5 | 4
(United States) C McNally | 7^{7} | 2 | 6
(Latvia) A Sevastova | 6^{3} | 6 | 4
(Spain) P Badosa | 6 | 6^{2} | 6
5/WC | (Switzerland) B Bencic | 2 | 7^{7} | 1

Third round
1 | (Australia) A Barty | 7^{7} | 4 | 6
(United States) S Rogers | 6^{3} | 6 | 4
(United States) C McNally | 3 | 3
(Spain) P Badosa | 6 | 6

Quarterfinals
1 | (Australia) A Barty | 4 | 3
(Spain) P Badosa | 6 | 6

==== Section 2 ====
First round
Q | (Japan) K Nara | 6 | 6
(United States) F Di Lorenzo | 2 | 2
(Mexico) R Zarazúa | 4 | 3
WC | (United States) E Navarro | 6 | 6
Q | (United States) D Krawczyk | 1 | 2
15 | (Russia) V Kudermetova | 6 | 6
17 | (Czech Republic) M Bouzková | 6 | 7
(Hungary) T Babos | 2 | 5
(Australia) A Tomljanović | 6 | 6
(United States) C McHale | 3 | 0
(United States) S Stephens | 6 | 6
LL | (China) Xin Wang | 2 | 4

Second round
LL | (United States) W Osuigwe | 1 | 4
Q | (Japan) K Nara | 6 | 6
WC | (United States) E Navarro | 4 | 4
15 | (Russia) V Kudermetova | 6 | 6
17 | (Czech Republic) M Bouzková | 6 | 5 | 5
(Australia) A Tomljanović | 4 | 7 | 7
(United States) S Stephens | 6 | 6
8 | (United States) M Keys | 4 | 4

Third round
Q | (Japan) K Nara | 0 | 3
15 | (Russia) V Kudermetova | 6 | 6
(Australia) A Tomljanović | 3 | 4
(United States) S Stephens | 6 | 6

Quarterfinals
15 | (Russia) V Kudermetova | 6 | 6
(United States) S Stephens | 3 | 4

=== Bottom half ===
==== Section 3 ====
First round
Q | (Poland) M Fręch | 6 | 6
Q | (United States) G Min | 2 | 4
Q | (Russia) N Vikhlyantseva | 3 | 1
(Kazakhstan) Z Diyas | 6 | 6
LL | (United Kingdom) H Dart | 6^{8} | 4
11 | (Kazakhstan) Y Putintseva | 7^{10} | 6
16 | (China) S Zhang | 3 | 1
(Canada) LA Fernandez | 6 | 6
Q | (Romania) G Talabă | 6^{2} | 4
(Montenegro) D Kovinić | 7^{7} | 6
Q | (Australia) S Sanders | 6 | 6
Q | (United States) A Muhammad | 2 | 4

Second round
6 | (Spain) G Muguruza | 6 | 6
Q | (Poland) M Fręch | 1 | 3
(Kazakhstan) Z Diyas | 2 | 2
11 | (Kazakhstan) Y Putintseva | 6 | 6
(Canada) LA Fernandez | 4 | 6 | 3
(Montenegro) D Kovinić | 6 | 3 | 6
Q | (Australia) S Sanders | 6^{4} | 2
3/WC | (Czech Republic) P Kvitová | 7^{7} | 6

Third round
6 | (Spain) G Muguruza | 6 | 2^{r}
11 | (Kazakhstan) Y Putintseva | 0 | 2
(Montenegro) D Kovinić | 6 | 6
3/WC | (Czech Republic) P Kvitová | 4 | 1

Quarterfinals
11 | (Kazakhstan) Y Putintseva | 7^{7} | 5 | 1
(Montenegro) D Kovinić | 6^{2} | 7 | 6

==== Section 4 ====
First round
(United States) B Pera | 6 | 4 | 4
(France) A Cornet | 4 | 6 | 6
LL | (United States) C Dolehide | 3 | 3
WC | (United States) H Baptiste | 6 | 6
(Italy) M Trevisan | 2 | 2
12 | (Tunisia) O Jabeur | 6 | 6
14 | (United States) C Gauff | 6 | 6
(Bulgaria) T Pironkova | 3 | 0
(Japan) N Hibino | 2 | 1
(Russia) L Samsonova | 6 | 6
(United States) L Davis | 6 | 6
(United States) M Brengle | 4 | 2

Second round
7 | (Belgium) E Mertens | 5 | 3
(France) A Cornet | 7 | 6
WC | (United States) H Baptiste | 3 | 3
12 | (Tunisia) O Jabeur | 6 | 6
14 | (United States) C Gauff | 4 | 6 | 6
(Russia) L Samsonova | 6 | 1 | 4
(United States) L Davis | 4 | 6 | 6
2 | (United States) S Kenin | 6 | 3 | 4

Third round
(France) A Cornet | 7 | 3 | 3
12 | (Tunisia) O Jabeur | 5 | 6 | 6
14 | (United States) C Gauff | 6 | 7^{7}
(United States) L Davis | 2 | 6^{2}

Quarterfinals
12 | (Tunisia) O Jabeur | 6 | 6
14 | (United States) C Gauff | 3 | 3

== Qualifying ==
=== Seeds ===
1. (United Kingdom) Harriet Dart (qualifying competition, lucky loser)
2. (Slovakia) Kristína Kučová (first round, retired)
3. (China) Wang Xinyu (qualifying competition, lucky loser)
4. (Russia) Natalia Vikhlyantseva (qualified)
5. (United States) Caroline Dolehide (qualifying competition, lucky loser)
6. (United States) Whitney Osuigwe (qualifying competition, lucky loser)
7. (Poland) Magdalena Fręch (qualified)
8. (Japan) Kurumi Nara (qualified)
9. (Russia) Varvara Flink (first round)
10. (United States) Allie Kiick (qualifying competition)
11. (Australia) Storm Sanders (qualified)
12. (United States) Asia Muhammad (qualified)
13. (Romania) Gabriela Talabă (qualified)
14. (United States) Grace Min (qualified)
15. (Australia) Ellen Perez (first round)
16. (Ukraine) Kateryna Bondarenko (qualifying competition)

=== Qualifiers ===
1. (United States) Grace Min
2. (United States) Desirae Krawczyk
3. (Romania) Gabriela Talabă
4. (Russia) Natalia Vikhlyantseva
5. (Australia) Storm Sanders
6. (United States) Asia Muhammad
7. (Poland) Magdalena Fręch
8. (Japan) Kurumi Nara

=== Lucky losers ===
1. (China) Wang Xinyu
2. (United Kingdom) Harriet Dart
3. (United States) Caroline Dolehide
4. (United States) Whitney Osuigwe

=== Draw ===
==== First qualifier ====
First round
1 | (United Kingdom) Harriet Dart | 6 | 6
WC | (United States) Rachel Gailis | 1 | 2
(United States) Katerina Stewart | 2 | 1
14 | (United States) Grace Min | 6 | 6

Qualifying competition
1 | (United Kingdom) Harriet Dart | 2 | 2
14 | (United States) Grace Min | 6 | 6

==== Second qualifier ====
First round
2 | (Slovakia) Kristína Kučová | 2 | 2^{r}
(United States) Desirae Krawczyk | 6 | 1
(United States) Catherine Harrison | 7 | 2 | 3
16 | (Ukraine) Kateryna Bondarenko | 5 | 6 | 6

Qualifying competition
(United States) Desirae Krawczyk | 2 | 7 | 6
16 | (Ukraine) Kateryna Bondarenko | 6 | 5 | 4

==== Third qualifier ====
First round
3 | (China) Wang Xinyu | 6^{5} | 6 | 6
WC | (United States) Kennedy Shaffer | 7^{7} | 1 | 0
(Mexico) Fernanda Contreras | 6 | 4 | 1
13 | (Romania) Gabriela Talabă | 4 | 6 | 6

Qualifying competition
3 | (China) Wang Xinyu | 6 | 1 | 3
13 | (Romania) Gabriela Talabă | 4 | 6 | 6

==== Fourth qualifier ====
First round
4 | (Russia) Natalia Vikhlyantseva | 6 | 6
WC | (Georgia (country)) Oksana Kalashnikova | 0 | 0
(United States) Alycia Parks | 6 | 6
15 | (Australia) Ellen Perez | 2 | 4

Qualifying competition
4 | (Russia) Natalia Vikhlyantseva | 6 | 6
(United States) Alycia Parks | 4 | 1

==== Fifth qualifier ====
First round
5 | (United States) Caroline Dolehide | 6 | 6
(Sweden) Mirjam Björklund | 4 | 3
(Canada) Gabriela Dabrowski | 3 | 3
11 | (Australia) Storm Sanders | 6 | 6

Qualifying competition
5 | (United States) Caroline Dolehide | 6 | 4 | 6^{4}
11 | (Australia) Storm Sanders | 2 | 6 | 7^{7}

==== Sixth qualifier ====
First round
6 | (United States) Whitney Osuigwe | 6 | 3 | 6
(Chile) Alexa Guarachi | 3 | 6 | 2
(United States) Jamie Loeb | 4 | 2
12 | (United States) Asia Muhammad | 6 | 6

Qualifying competition
6 | (United States) Whitney Osuigwe | 2 | 6^{3}
12 | (United States) Asia Muhammad | 6 | 7^{7}

==== Seventh qualifier ====
First round
7 | (Poland) Magdalena Fręch | 7^{7} | 6
(United States) Katrina Scott | 6^{3} | 3
(Canada) Katherine Sebov | 6 | 6
9 | (Russia) Varvara Flink | 2 | 3

Qualifying competition
7 | (Poland) Magdalena Fręch | 7 | 6
(Canada) Katherine Sebov | 5 | 1

==== Eighth qualifier ====
First round
8 | (Japan) Kurumi Nara | 6 | 6
WC | (United States) Whitley Pate | 3 | 2
(Czech Republic) Lucie Hradecká | 0 | 1
10 | (United States) Allie Kiick | 6 | 6

Qualifying competition
8 | (Japan) Kurumi Nara | 6 | 6
10 | (United States) Allie Kiick | 2 | 1
