= 2021 MUSC Health Women's Open – Doubles =

Doubles
- 2021 MUSC Health Women's Open

Final
- Champions: (United States) Hailey Baptiste (United States) Caty McNally
- Runners-up: (Australia) Ellen Perez (Australia) Storm Sanders
- Score: 6–7^{(4–7)}, 6–4, [10–6]

Events
| Singles | Doubles |
| MUSC Health Women's Open | · 2022 → |

Hailey Baptiste and Caty McNally won the second 2021 Charleston Open, billed as the MUSC Health Women's Open, defeating Ellen Perez and Storm Sanders in the final, 6–7^{(4–7)}, 6–4, [10–6]. This was Baptiste's first WTA doubles title.

The 50th playing of the tournament occurred immediately after the 49th playing in 2021. This featured consecutive events, with the 2021 Volvo Car Open being the first. The second Charleston tournament was organised with a single-year license in 2021.

== Seeds ==
1. (Australia) Ellen Perez / (Australia) Storm Sanders (final)
2. (United States) Kaitlyn Christian / (United States) Sabrina Santamaria (first round)
3. (Japan) Misaki Doi / (Japan) Nao Hibino (withdrew, Misaki Doi muscle cramping)
4. (Australia) Arina Rodionova / (Netherlands) Rosalie van der Hoek (first round, retired)

== Draw ==
=== Key ===
- Q = Qualifier
- WC = Wild card
- LL = Lucky loser
- Alt = Alternate
- SE = Special exempt
- PR = Protected ranking
- ITF = ITF entry
- JE = Junior exempt
- w/o = Walkover
- r = Retired
- d = Defaulted
- SR = Special ranking

=== Draw ===
First round
1 | (Australia) E Perez (Australia) S Sanders | 6 | 6
(Japan) K Nara (Japan) M Ninomiya | 0 | 1
PR | (Georgia (country)) O Kalashnikova (Russia) A Kudryavtseva | 6^{7} | 6 | [2]
(Poland) K Piter (China) Y Wang | 7^{9} | 2 | [10]
4 | (Australia) Ar Rodionova (Netherlands) R van der Hoek | 1 | 0^{r}
(United States) J Loeb (New Zealand) E Routliffe | 6 | 4
(United States) E Bektas (United Kingdom) T Moore | 4 | 1
(Germany) J Wachaczyk (Mexico) R Zarazúa | 6 | 6
(France) E Lechemia (United States) I Neel | 6^{4} | 7 | [10]
(United States) Q Gleason (United States) M Sanchez | 7^{7} | 5 | [8]
(United Kingdom) N Broady (Australia) A Sharma | w/o
Alt | (Czech Republic) L Fruhvirtová (Czech Republic) T Martincová
WC | (United States) S Chang (United States) E Navarro | 2 | 4
(United States) H Baptiste (United States) C McNally | 6 | 6
(Indonesia) B Gumulya (Indonesia) J Rompies | 7^{7} | 3 | [12]
2 | (United States) K Christian (United States) S Santamaria | 6^{2} | 6 | [10]

Quarterfinals
1 | (Australia) E Perez (Australia) S Sanders | 6 | 6
(Poland) K Piter (China) Y Wang | 1 | 3
(United States) J Loeb (New Zealand) E Routliffe | 2 | 4
(Germany) J Wachaczyk (Mexico) R Zarazúa | 6 | 6
(France) E Lechemia (United States) I Neel | 6 | 5 | [10]
(United Kingdom) N Broady (Australia) A Sharma | 3 | 7 | [6]
(United States) H Baptiste (United States) C McNally | 6 | 6
(Indonesia) B Gumulya (Indonesia) J Rompies | 0 | 0

Semifinals
1 | (Australia) E Perez (Australia) S Sanders | 6 | 6
(Germany) J Wachaczyk (Mexico) R Zarazúa | 2 | 2
(France) E Lechemia (United States) I Neel | 0 | 2
(United States) H Baptiste (United States) C McNally | 6 | 6

Final
1 | (Australia) E Perez (Australia) S Sanders | 7^{7} | 4 | [6]
(United States) H Baptiste (United States) C McNally | 6^{4} | 6 | [10]
