= 2021 MUSC Health Women's Open =

- Date: 12–18 April
- Edition: 49th
- Category: WTA 250
- Draw: 32S / 16D
- Prize money: US$235,238
- Surface: Green clay
- Location: Charleston, South Carolina, United States
- Venue: Family Circle Tennis Center

Champions

Singles
- (Australia) Astra Sharma

Doubles
- (United States) Hailey Baptiste / (United States) Caty McNally
← 2021 ·	Charleston Open	· 2022 →

The second 2021 Charleston Open (branded as the MUSC Health Women's Open for commercial reasons) was a tournament on the 2021 WTA Tour. It was played on outdoor green clay courts in Daniel Island. It was held one day after the 48th edition ended and was a replacement tournament for other tournaments that were not held because of travel restrictions, and organised by Charleston Tennis with a single-year licence in 2021, held at Family Circle Tennis Center from April 12 to 18, 2021.

== Champions ==
=== Singles ===
- (Australia) Astra Sharma def. (Tunisia) Ons Jabeur, 2–6, 7–5, 6–1

=== Doubles ===
- (United States) Hailey Baptiste / (United States) Caty McNally def. (Australia) Ellen Perez / (Australia) Storm Sanders, 6–7^{(4–7)}, 6–4, [10–6]

== Singles main-draw entrants ==
=== Seeds ===
Country	Player	Rank^{1}	Seed
TUN	Ons Jabeur	28	1
POL	Magda Linette	51	2
USA	Shelby Rogers	52	3
FRA	Alizé Cornet	59	4
JPN	Misaki Doi	77	5
AUS	Ajla Tomljanović	78	6
USA	Lauren Davis	79	7
USA	Madison Brengle	81	8

- ^{1} Rankings are as of April 5, 2021

=== Other entrants ===
The following players received wildcards into the main draw:

- (Czech Republic) Linda Fruhvirtová
- (United States) Emma Navarro
- (United States) CoCo Vandeweghe

The following player received entry as a special exempt:

- (Colombia) Camila Osorio

The following players received entry from the qualifying draw:

- (United States) Claire Liu
- (United States) Grace Min
- (United States) Alycia Parks
- (Australia) Storm Sanders

=== Withdrawals ===
Before the tournament

- (United States) Amanda Anisimova → replaced by (United States) Caty McNally
- (Romania) Irina-Camelia Begu → replaced by (China) Wang Yafan
- (Russia) Anna Blinkova → replaced by (Russia) Liudmila Samsonova
- (United States) Danielle Collins → replaced by (United States) Francesca Di Lorenzo
- (United States) Coco Gauff → replaced by (Bulgaria) Viktoriya Tomova
- (United States) Madison Keys → replaced by (Italy) Sara Errani
- (Czech Republic) Barbora Krejčíková → replaced by (Czech Republic) Tereza Martincová
- (United States) Ann Li → replaced by (Montenegro) Danka Kovinić
- (United States) Jessica Pegula → replaced by (Denmark) Clara Tauson
- (Sweden) Rebecca Peterson → replaced by (United States) Christina McHale
- (Kazakhstan) Yulia Putintseva → replaced by (Mexico) Renata Zarazúa
- (Russia) Anastasia Potapova → replaced by (Switzerland) Stefanie Vögele
- (Germany) Laura Siegemund → replaced by (United States) Kristie Ahn
- (United States) Sloane Stephens → replaced by (Russia) Natalia Vikhlyantseva

=== Retirements ===
- (France) Alizé Cornet
- (Japan) Misaki Doi
- (Czech Republic) Tereza Martincová

== Doubles main-draw entrants ==
=== Seeds ===
Country	Player	Country	Player	Rank^{1}	Seed
AUS	Ellen Perez	AUS	Storm Sanders	117	1
USA	Kaitlyn Christian	USA	Sabrina Santamaria	123	2
~~JPN~~	~~Misaki Doi~~	~~JPN~~	~~Nao Hibino~~	~~158~~	~~3~~
AUS	Arina Rodionova	NED	Rosalie van der Hoek	167	4

- Rankings are as of April 5, 2021.

=== Other entrants ===
The following pair received a wildcard into the doubles main draw:

- (United States) Sophie Chang / (United States) Emma Navarro

The following pair received entry into the doubles main draw using a protected ranking:

- (Georgia (country)) Oksana Kalashnikova / (Russia) Alla Kudryavtseva

The following pair received entry into the doubles main draw as an alternate:

- (Czech Republic) Linda Fruhvirtová / (Czech Republic) Tereza Martincová

=== Withdrawals ===
Before the tournament

- (Russia) Anna Blinkova / (Czech Republic) Lucie Hradecká → replaced by (France) Elixane Lechemia / (United States) Ingrid Neel
- (Japan) Misaki Doi / (Japan) Nao Hibino → replaced by (Czech Republic) Linda Fruhvirtová / (Czech Republic) Tereza Martincová
- (United States) Coco Gauff / (United States) Caty McNally → replaced by (Indonesia) Beatrice Gumulya / (Indonesia) Jessy Rompies
- (Japan) Makoto Ninomiya / (China) Yang Zhaoxuan → replaced by (United States) Jamie Loeb / (New Zealand) Erin Routliffe

During the tournament

- (Czech Republic) Linda Fruhvirtová / (Czech Republic) Tereza Martincová

=== Retirements ===
- (Australia) Arina Rodionova / (Netherlands) Rosalie van der Hoek
