= 2022 Credit One Charleston Open – Doubles =

Doubles
- 2022 Credit One Charleston Open

Final
- Champions: (Slovenia) Andreja Klepač (Poland) Magda Linette
- Runners-up: (Czech Republic) Lucie Hradecká (India) Sania Mirza
- Score: 6–2, 4–6, [10–7]

Events
Singles	Doubles
← 2021 ·	Charleston Open	· 2023 →

Andreja Klepač and Magda Linette defeated Lucie Hradecká and Sania Mirza in the final, 6–2, 4–6, [10–7], to win the doubles tennis title at the 2022 Charleston Open. Klepač and Linette were making their team debut, and their victory earned Klepač her 11th career WTA Tour doubles title and Linette her first. Hradecká was competing to win her first title at the tournament after two prior runner-up finishes in 2017 and 2021, while two-time champion Mirza was making her first appearance since winning in 2015.

Nicole Melichar and Demi Schuurs were the defending champions, but they chose not to defend their title together. Schuurs partnered Desirae Krawczyk but lost in the first round to Anna Bondár and Magdalena Fręch. Melichar withdrew before the tournament.

== Seeds ==
1. (United States) Caroline Dolehide / (China) Zhang Shuai (semifinals)
2. (United States) Desirae Krawczyk / (Netherlands) Demi Schuurs (first round)
3. (Chile) Alexa Guarachi / (United States) Jessica Pegula (quarterfinals)
4. (Slovenia) Andreja Klepač / (Poland) Magda Linette (champions)

== Draw ==
=== Key ===
- Q = Qualifier
- WC = Wild card
- LL = Lucky loser
- Alt = Alternate
- SE = Special exempt
- PR = Protected ranking
- ITF = ITF entry
- JE = Junior exempt
- w/o = Walkover
- r = Retired
- d = Defaulted
- SR = Special ranking

=== Draw ===
First Round
1	(United States) C Dolehide (China) S Zhang	6	4	[10]
PR	(Ukraine) L Kichenok (Australia) An Rodionova	2	6	[6]
PR	(Slovakia) T Mihalíková (Czech Republic) K Peschke	3	3
(Kazakhstan) A Danilina; A Sasnovich	6	6
3	(Chile) A Guarachi (United States) J Pegula	6	6
(Tunisia) O Jabeur; A Sabalenka	4	3
WC	(United States) F Di Lorenzo (United States) K Volynets	5	6^{5}
(Czech Republic) L Hradecká (India) S Mirza	7	7^{7}
(Germany) V Heisen (China) Y Xu	7^{7}	7^{8}
(Norway) U Eikeri (Ukraine) N Kichenok	6^{4}	6^{6}
(Poland) A Rosolska (New Zealand) E Routliffe	6	1	[7]
4	(Slovenia) A Klepač (Poland) M Linette	4	6	[10]
(Chinese Taipei) H-c Chan (China) Z Yang	3	6	[4]
(Switzerland) B Bencic (Ukraine) A Kalinina	6	2	[10]
(Hungary) A Bondár (Poland) M Fręch	6	3	[10]
2	(United States) D Krawczyk (Netherlands) D Schuurs	4	6	[7]

Quarterfinals
1	(United States) C Dolehide (China) S Zhang	6	6
(Kazakhstan) A Danilina; A Sasnovich	3	2
3	(Chile) A Guarachi (United States) J Pegula	6	3	[6]
(Czech Republic) L Hradecká (India) S Mirza	3	6	[10]
(Germany) V Heisen (China) Y Xu	2	3
4	(Slovenia) A Klepač (Poland) M Linette	6	6
(Switzerland) B Bencic (Ukraine) A Kalinina	6	6
(Hungary) A Bondár (Poland) M Fręch	1	2

Semifinals
1	(United States) C Dolehide (China) S Zhang	2	6	[8]
(Czech Republic) L Hradecká (India) S Mirza	6	4	[10]
4	(Slovenia) A Klepač (Poland) M Linette	6	7^{8}
(Switzerland) B Bencic (Ukraine) A Kalinina	3	6^{6}

Final
(Czech Republic) L Hradecká (India) S Mirza	2	6	[7]
4	(Slovenia) A Klepač (Poland) M Linette	6	4	[10]
