= 2021 MUSC Health Women's Open – Singles =

Singles
- 2021 MUSC Health Women's Open

Final
- Champion: (Australia) Astra Sharma
- Runner-up: (Tunisia) Ons Jabeur
- Score: 2–6, 7–5, 6–1

Details
- Draw: 32 (4 Q / 3 WC)
- Seeds: 8

Events
Singles	Doubles
MUSC Health Women's Open

Astra Sharma won her first WTA Tour singles title, defeating Ons Jabeur in the final of the second 2021 Charleston Open, 2–6, 7–5, 6–1.

The second tournament was the 50th edition of the Charleston Open that featured featuring consecutive events, with the 2021 Volvo Car Open being the first. The second Charleston tournament was organised with a single-year license in 2021.

== Seeds ==
1. (Tunisia) Ons Jabeur (final)
2. (Poland) Magda Linette (first round)
3. (United States) Shelby Rogers (quarterfinals)
4. (France) Alizé Cornet (first round, retired)
5. (Japan) Misaki Doi (first round, retired)
6. (Australia) Ajla Tomljanović (second round)
7. (United States) Lauren Davis (second round)
8. (United States) Madison Brengle (second round)

== Draw ==
=== Key ===
- Q = Qualifier
- WC = Wild card
- LL = Lucky loser
- Alt = Alternate
- SE = Special exempt
- PR = Protected ranking
- ITF = ITF entry
- JE = Junior exempt
- w/o = Walkover
- r = Retired
- d = Defaulted
- SR = Special ranking

=== Finals ===
Semifinals
1	(Tunisia) Ons Jabeur	6	6
(Montenegro) Danka Kovinić	3	0
(Australia) Astra Sharma	7^{7}	6
SE	(Colombia) Camila Osorio	6^{5}	1

Final
1	(Tunisia) Ons Jabeur	6	5	1
(Australia) Astra Sharma	2	7	6

=== Top half ===
First round
1	(Tunisia) O Jabeur	6	6
(Switzerland) S Vögele	4	1
Q	(United States) A Parks	6	6
Q	(United States) G Min	1	4
(United States) K Ahn	6^{6}	2
(United States) F Di Lorenzo	7^{8}	6
(Japan) N Hibino	7	5	6
5	(Japan) M Doi	5	7	6^{r}
3	(United States) S Rogers	6	6
(United States) C McNally	0	1
Q	(United States) C Liu	7	4	6
Q	(Australia) S Sanders	5	6	0
(Montenegro) D Kovinić	6	6
(Bulgaria) V Tomova	3	3
WC	(United States) C Vandeweghe	6^{3}	4
7	(United States) L Davis	7^{7}	6

Second round
1	(Tunisia) O Jabeur	6	6
Q	(United States) A Parks	4	0
(United States) F Di Lorenzo	4	3
(Japan) N Hibino	6	6
3	(United States) S Rogers	6	6
Q	(United States) C Liu	2	2
(Montenegro) D Kovinić	6	1	6
7	(United States) L Davis	1	6	3

Quarterfinals
1	(Tunisia) O Jabeur	6	6
(Japan) N Hibino	0	1
3	(United States) S Rogers	5	1
(Montenegro) D Kovinić	7	6

Semifinals
1	(Tunisia) O Jabeur	6	6
(Montenegro) D Kovinić	3	0

=== Bottom half ===
First round
8	(United States) M Brengle	6	3	6
(Russia) N Vikhlyantseva	0	6	2
(China) Y Wang	4	2
(Australia) A Sharma	6	6
(Czech Republic) T Martincová	3	2^{r}
WC	(United States) E Navarro	6	3
WC	(Czech Republic) L Fruhvirtová	6	6^{7}	4
4	(France) A Cornet	2	7^{9}	4^{r}
6	(Australia) A Tomljanović	6	6
(Mexico) R Zarazúa	1	1
(Denmark) C Tauson	6	6
(Russia) L Samsonova	3	3
(United States) C McHale	7^{7}	6
(Italy) S Errani	6^{3}	3
SE	(Colombia) C Osorio	6	4	7
2	(Poland) M Linette	3	6	5

Second round
8	(United States) M Brengle	4	6	5
(Australia) A Sharma	6	4	7
WC	(United States) E Navarro	4	2
WC	(Czech Republic) L Fruhvirtová	6	6
6	(Australia) A Tomljanović	1	4
(Denmark) C Tauson	6	6
(United States) C McHale	6	6^{2}	6^{1}
SE	(Colombia) C Osorio	2	7^{7}	7^{7}

Quarterfinals
(Australia) A Sharma	6	6
WC	(Czech Republic) L Fruhvirtová	4	3
(Denmark) C Tauson	4	0^{r}
SE	(Colombia) C Osorio	6	1

Semifinals
(Australia) A Sharma	7^{7}	6
SE	(Colombia) C Osorio	6^{5}	1

== Qualifying ==
=== Seeds ===
1. (Mexico) Renata Zarazúa (moved to main draw)
2. (Russia) Natalia Vikhlyantseva (moved to main draw)
3. (United States) Francesca Di Lorenzo (moved to main draw)
4. (Switzerland) Leonie Küng (first round)
5. (United States) Caroline Dolehide (first round)
6. (United States) Usue Maitane Arconada (first round)
7. (Japan) Kurumi Nara (qualifying competition)
8. (Australia) Arina Rodionova (withdrew)

=== Qualifiers ===
1. (United States) Claire Liu
2. (Australia) Storm Sanders
3. (United States) Alycia Parks
4. (United States) Grace Min

=== Draw ===
==== First qualifier ====
First round
Alt	(United States) Hailey Baptiste	4	0^{r}
(United States) Claire Liu	6	3
Alt	(Australia) Ellen Perez	6^{1}	7^{7}	7
6	(United States) Usue Maitane Arconada	7^{7}	6^{1}	5

Qualifying competition
(United States) Claire Liu	2	6	6
Alt	(Australia) Ellen Perez	6	4	0

==== Second qualifier ====
First round
Alt	(Germany) Katharina Gerlach	3	2
(Australia) Storm Sanders	6	6
(United States) Whitney Osuigwe	2	0
7	(Japan) Kurumi Nara	6	6

Qualifying competition
(Australia) Storm Sanders	7^{7}	6
7	(Japan) Kurumi Nara	6^{4}	2

==== Third qualifier ====
First round
Alt	(United States) Alycia Parks	6	6
PR	(Russia) Varvara Flink	3	3
WC	(United States) Kennedy Shaffer	1	7	2
Alt	(Ukraine) Kateryna Bondarenko	6	5	6

Qualifying competition
Alt	(United States) Alycia Parks	3	6	6
Alt	(Ukraine) Kateryna Bondarenko	6	3	3

==== Fourth qualifier ====
First round
4	(Switzerland) Leonie Küng	3	4
WC	(United States) Gabriella Price	6	6
Alt	(United States) Grace Min	7^{7}	2	7
5	(United States) Caroline Dolehide	6^{4}	6	5

Qualifying competition
WC	(United States) Gabriella Price	0	4
Alt	(United States) Grace Min	6	6
