= 2023 Credit One Charleston Open – Doubles =

Doubles
- 2023 Credit One Charleston Open

Final
- Champions: (United States) Danielle Collins (United States) Desirae Krawczyk
- Runners-up: (Mexico) Giuliana Olmos (Japan) Ena Shibahara
- Score: 0–6, 6–4, [14–12]

Details
- Draw: 16
- Seeds: 4

Events
Singles	Doubles
← 2022 ·	Charleston Open	· 2024 →

Danielle Collins and Desirae Krawczyk defeated Giuliana Olmos and Ena Shibahara in the final, 0–6, 6–4, [14–12] to win the doubles tennis title at the 2023 Charleston Open. They saved two championship points en route to their victory, which earned Collins her first career doubles title and Krawczyk her eighth.

Andreja Klepač and Magda Linette were the reigning champions, but chose not to compete this year.

== Seeds ==
1. (Mexico) Giuliana Olmos / (Japan) Ena Shibahara (final)
2. (France) Kristina Mladenovic / (China) Zhang Shuai (quarterfinals)
3. (United States) Caroline Dolehide / (Australia) Storm Hunter (semifinals)
4. (United States) Nicole Melichar-Martinez / (United States) Alycia Parks (quarterfinals)

== Draw ==
=== Key ===
- Q = Qualifier
- WC = Wild card
- LL = Lucky loser
- Alt = Alternate
- SE = Special exempt
- PR = Protected ranking
- ITF = ITF entry
- JE = Junior exempt
- w/o = Walkover
- r = Retired
- d = Defaulted
- SR = Special ranking

=== Draw ===
First round
1	(Mexico) G Olmos (Japan) E Shibahara	7	6
(Chile) A Guarachi (New Zealand) E Routliffe	5	2
WC	(United States) B Mattek-Sands (United States) S Rogers	2	4
Y Sizikova (Indonesia) A Sutjiadi	6	6
3	(United States) C Dolehide (Australia) S Hunter	7	6
(Norway) U Eikeri (Czech Republic) M Kolodziejová	5	3
(Poland) K Kawa (Poland) A Rosolska	4	3
WC	(Canada) L Fernandez (United States) T Townsend	6	6
(Germany) L Siegemund; V Zvonareva	2	6	[10]
(Czech Republic) M Bouzková (Japan) M Kato	6	0	[7]
(United Kingdom) A Barnett (United Kingdom) O Nicholls	7	6^{8}	[8]
4	(United States) N Melichar-Martinez (United States) A Parks	5	7^{10}	[10]
(United States) D Collins (United States) D Krawczyk	6	4	[10]
(Spain) C Bucșa (Kazakhstan) A Danilina	1	6	[8]
(United States) S Chang (United States) A Kulikov	5	3
2	(France) K Mladenovic (China) S Zhang	7	6

Quarterfinals
1	(Mexico) G Olmos (Japan) E Shibahara	6	6
Y Sizikova (Indonesia) A Sutjiadi	3	2
3	(United States) C Dolehide (Australia) S Hunter	6	4	[11]
WC	(Canada) L Fernandez (United States) T Townsend	0	6	[9]
(Germany) L Siegemund; V Zvonareva	6	7^{7}
4	(United States) N Melichar-Martinez (United States) A Parks	2	6^{5}
(United States) D Collins (United States) D Krawczyk	6	3	[10]
2	(France) K Mladenovic (China) S Zhang	3	6	[7]

Semifinals
1	(Mexico) G Olmos (Japan) E Shibahara	7^{7}	6
3	(United States) C Dolehide (Australia) S Hunter	6^{4}	4
(Germany) L Siegemund; V Zvonareva	1	6	[7]
(United States) D Collins (United States) D Krawczyk	6	1	[10]

Final
1	(Mexico) G Olmos (Japan) E Shibahara	6	4	[12]
(United States) D Collins (United States) D Krawczyk	0	6	[14]
