= 2021 Volvo Car Open – Doubles =

Doubles
- 2021 Volvo Car Open

Final
- Champions: (United States) Nicole Melichar (Netherlands) Demi Schuurs
- Runners-up: (Czech Republic) Marie Bouzková (Czech Republic) Lucie Hradecká
- Score: 6–2, 6–4

Events
Singles	Doubles
← 2019 ·	Charleston Open	· 2022 →

Nicole Melichar and Demi Schuurs defeated Marie Bouzková and Lucie Hradecká in the final, 6–2, 6–4, to win the doubles tennis title at the 2021 Charleston Open. It marked their third title together as a team.

Anna-Lena Grönefeld and Alicja Rosolska were the defending champions from when the tournament was last held in 2019. Neither defended their title after Grönefeld retired from professional tennis at the end of 2019 and Rosolska did not return to compete.

== Seeds ==
1. (United States) Nicole Melichar / (Netherlands) Demi Schuurs (champions)
2. (Hungary) Tímea Babos / (Russia) Veronika Kudermetova (quarterfinals, withdrew)
3. (China) Xu Yifan / (China) Zhang Shuai (first round)
4. (Chile) Alexa Guarachi / (United States) Desirae Krawczyk (semifinals)

== Draw ==
=== Key ===
- Q = Qualifier
- WC = Wild card
- LL = Lucky loser
- Alt = Alternate
- SE = Special exempt
- PR = Protected ranking
- ITF = ITF entry
- JE = Junior exempt
- w/o = Walkover
- r = Retired
- d = Defaulted
- SR = Special ranking

=== Draw ===
First round
1	(United States) N Melichar (Netherlands) D Schuurs	3	6	[10]
PR	(Australia) E Perez (United States) C Vandeweghe	6	1	[4]
(Tunisia) O Jabeur (Russia) A Potapova	6	6
PR	(Georgia (country)) O Kalashnikova (Russia) A Kudryavtseva	1	4
3	(China) Y Xu (China) S Zhang	1	4
WC	(United States) C Dolehide (United States) E Navarro	6	6
(Canada) G Dabrowski (United States) A Muhammad	6	3	[10]
(Croatia) D Jurak (Slovenia) A Klepač	4	6	[5]
(United States) S Kenin (United States) B Mattek-Sands	3	3
(United States) C Gauff (United States) C McNally	6	6
PR	(United States) V King (Kazakhstan) Y Shvedova	2	6^{5}
4	(Chile) A Guarachi (United States) D Krawczyk	6	7^{7}
(Czech Republic) M Bouzková (Czech Republic) L Hradecká	6	6
(United States) H Carter (Brazil) L Stefani	2	4
(Japan) M Doi (Japan) N Hibino	3	4
2	(Hungary) T Babos (Russia) V Kudermetova	6	6

Quarterfinals
1	(United States) N Melichar (Netherlands) D Schuurs	6	6
(Tunisia) O Jabeur (Russia) A Potapova	3	2
WC	(United States) C Dolehide (United States) E Navarro	4	2
(Canada) G Dabrowski (United States) A Muhammad	6	6
(United States) C Gauff (United States) C McNally
4	(Chile) A Guarachi (United States) D Krawczyk	w/o
(Czech Republic) M Bouzková (Czech Republic) L Hradecká	w/o
2	(Hungary) T Babos (Russia) V Kudermetova

Semifinals
1	(United States) N Melichar (Netherlands) D Schuurs	7	6
(Canada) G Dabrowski (United States) A Muhammad	5	1
4	(Chile) A Guarachi (United States) D Krawczyk	3	6	[7]
(Czech Republic) M Bouzková (Czech Republic) L Hradecká	6	0	[10]

Final
1	(United States) N Melichar (Netherlands) D Schuurs	6	6
(Czech Republic) M Bouzková (Czech Republic) L Hradecká	2	4
