= 2023 Credit One Charleston Open =

- Date: April 3–9
- Edition: 51st
- Category: WTA 500
- Draw: 56S / 16D
- Prize money: $780,637
- Surface: Green clay / outdoor
- Location: Charleston, SC, United States
- Venue: Family Circle Tennis Center

Champions

Singles
- (Tunisia) Ons Jabeur

Doubles
- (United States) Danielle Collins / (United States) Desirae Krawczyk
- Charleston Open

The 2023 Charleston Open (branded as the 2023 Credit One Charleston Open for sponsorship reasons) was a professional women's tennis tournament played on outdoor clay courts at the Family Circle Tennis Center on Daniel Island in Charleston, South Carolina. It was the 51st edition of the tournament on the WTA Tour and was classified as a WTA 500 tournament on the 2023 WTA Tour. It was the only event of the clay court season played on green clay.

== Champions ==
=== Singles ===
- (Tunisia) Ons Jabeur def. (Switzerland) Belinda Bencic, 7–6^{(8–6)}, 6–4

This was Jabeur's fourth WTA Tour singles title, and first of the year. A tweener and slice combination played by her in the first set of the final was selected WTA 2023 Shot of the Year.

=== Doubles ===
- (United States) Danielle Collins / (United States) Desirae Krawczyk def. (Mexico) Giuliana Olmos / (Japan) Ena Shibahara, 0–6, 6–4, [14–12]

== Points and prize money ==
=== Point distribution ===
Event	W	F	SF	QF	Round of 16	Round of 32	Round of 64	Q	Q2	Q1
Women's singles	470	305	185	100	55	30	1	25	13	1
Women's doubles	470	305	185	100	1	—N/a	—N/a	—N/a	—N/a	—N/a

=== Prize money ===
Event	W	F	SF	QF	Round of 16	Round of 32	Round of 64	Q2	Q1
Women's singles	$158,800	$98,190	$49,600	$19,400	$9,900	$5,420	$3,980	$2,400	$1,230
Women's doubles	$42,650	$25,900	$14,720	$7,650	$4,600	—N/a	—N/a	—N/a	—N/a

== Singles main draw entrants ==
=== Seeds ===
Country	Player	Rank^{1}	Seed
USA	Jessica Pegula	3	1
TUN	Ons Jabeur	5	2
	Daria Kasatkina	8	3
SUI	Belinda Bencic	9	4
	Veronika Kudermetova	11	5
	Victoria Azarenka	16	6
	Ekaterina Alexandrova	18	7
POL	Magda Linette	19	8
USA	Madison Keys	21	9
CHN	Zhang Shuai	27	10
UKR	Anhelina Kalinina	28	11
ESP	Paula Badosa	29	12
USA	Danielle Collins	30	13
SUI	Jil Teichmann	32	14
ROU	Irina-Camelia Begu	34	15
CZE	Marie Bouzková	36	16

- ^{1} Rankings as of March 20, 2023.

=== Other entrants ===
The following players received wildcards into the main draw:

- (United States) Fiona Crawley
- (United States) Caroline Dolehide
- (United States) Sofia Kenin
- (United States) Emma Navarro
- (Ukraine) Elina Svitolina

The following player received entry using a protected ranking into the main draw:

- Evgeniya Rodina

The following players received entry from the qualifying draw:

- (United States) Hailey Baptiste
- (United States) Louisa Chirico
- (United States) Kayla Day
- (Germany) Anna-Lena Friedsam
- (Germany) Sabine Lisicki
- (Argentina) Paula Ormaechea
- (Canada) Katherine Sebov
- (United States) Sachia Vickery

=== Withdrawals ===
Before the tournament

- (United States) Amanda Anisimova → replaced by (Hungary) Anna Bondár
- (Italy) Elisabetta Cocciaretto → replaced by (Hungary) Dalma Gálfi
- (Estonia) Anett Kontaveit → replaced by Evgeniya Rodina
- (Latvia) Jeļena Ostapenko → replaced by (Austria) Julia Grabher
- (United States) Alison Riske-Amritraj → replaced by (Spain) Cristina Bucșa
- Aryna Sabalenka → replaced by Diana Shnaider
- (Italy) Martina Trevisan → replaced by (United States) Madison Brengle

== Doubles main draw entrants ==
=== Seeds ===
Country	Player	Country	Player	Rank^{1}	Seed
MEX	Giuliana Olmos	JPN	Ena Shibahara	31	1
FRA	Kristina Mladenovic	CHN	Zhang Shuai	38	2
USA	Caroline Dolehide	AUS	Storm Hunter	49	3
USA	Nicole Melichar-Martinez	USA	Alycia Parks	57	4

- Rankings are as of March 20, 2023.

=== Other entrants ===
The following pairs received wildcards into the doubles main draw:

- (Canada) Leylah Fernandez / (United States) Taylor Townsend
- (United States) Bethanie Mattek-Sands / (United States) Shelby Rogers
