= 2019 Volvo Car Open – Doubles =

Doubles
- 2019 Volvo Car Open

Final
- Champions: (Germany) Anna-Lena Grönefeld (Poland) Alicja Rosolska
- Runners-up: (Russia) Irina Khromacheva (Russia) Veronika Kudermetova
- Score: 7–6^{(9–7)}, 6–2

Details
- Draw: 16
- Seeds: 4

Events
Singles	Doubles
← 2018 ·	Charleston Open	· 2021 →

Alla Kudryavtseva and Katarina Srebotnik were the defending champions, but Kudryavtseva chose not to participate. Srebotnik played alongside Raquel Atawo, but lost in the quarterfinals to Irina Khromacheva and Veronika Kudermetova.

Anna-Lena Grönefeld and Alicja Rosolska won the title, defeating Khromacheva and Kudermetova in the final, 7–6^{(9–7)}, 6–2

== Seeds ==
1. (United States) Nicole Melichar / (Czech Republic) Květa Peschke (quarterfinals)
2. (Czech Republic) Lucie Hradecká / (Slovenia) Andreja Klepač (semifinals)
3. (United States) Raquel Atawo / (Slovenia) Katarina Srebotnik (quarterfinals)
4. (Germany) Anna-Lena Grönefeld / (Poland) Alicja Rosolska (champions)

== Draw ==
=== Key ===
- Q = Qualifier
- WC = Wild card
- LL = Lucky loser
- Alt = Alternate
- SE = Special exempt
- PR = Protected ranking
- ITF = ITF entry
- JE = Junior exempt
- w/o = Walkover
- r = Retired
- d = Defaulted
- SR = Special ranking

=== Draw ===
First round
1	(United States) N Melichar (Czech Republic) K Peschke	6	2	[11]
(Sweden) J Larsson (Australia) A Tomljanović	1	6	[9]
PR	(Germany) A-L Friedsam (Spain) S Sorribes Tormo	6^{2}	6	[10]
(Romania) I Bara (Romania) M Buzărnescu	7^{7}	3	[7]
4	(Germany) A-L Grönefeld (Poland) A Rosolska	6	6
(United States) K Christian (United States) A Spears	1	4
(Japan) S Aoyama (Belarus) L Marozava	6	6
(United States) S Kenin (Hungary) F Stollár	4	3
(Russia) I Khromacheva (Russia) V Kudermetova	6	6
WC	(Italy) S Errani (Italy) M Trevisan	2	2
(Switzerland) B Bencic (Czech Republic) Kr Plíšková	2	1
3	(United States) R Atawo (Slovenia) K Srebotnik	6	6
WC	(United States) C Beck (United States) E Navarro	1	6	[13]
(Croatia) D Jurak (Latvia) J Ostapenko	6	3	[11]
(Ukraine) L Kichenok (Ukraine) N Kichenok	3	2
2	(Czech Republic) L Hradecká (Slovenia) A Klepač	6	6

Quarterfinals
1	(United States) N Melichar (Czech Republic) K Peschke	6^{1}	1
PR	(Germany) A-L Friedsam (Spain) S Sorribes Tormo	7^{7}	6
4	(Germany) A-L Grönefeld (Poland) A Rosolska	6	6
(Japan) S Aoyama (Belarus) L Marozava	0	1
(Russia) I Khromacheva (Russia) V Kudermetova	1	6	[10]
3	(United States) R Atawo (Slovenia) K Srebotnik	6	3	[5]
WC	(United States) C Beck (United States) E Navarro	3	2
2	(Czech Republic) L Hradecká (Slovenia) A Klepač	6	6

Semifinals
PR	(Germany) A-L Friedsam (Spain) S Sorribes Tormo	1	2
4	(Germany) A-L Grönefeld (Poland) A Rosolska	6	6
(Russia) I Khromacheva (Russia) V Kudermetova	6	6
2	(Czech Republic) L Hradecká (Slovenia) A Klepač	3	3

Final
4	(Germany) A-L Grönefeld (Poland) A Rosolska	7^{9}	6
(Russia) I Khromacheva (Russia) V Kudermetova	6^{7}	2
