= 2021 Volvo Car Open =

- Date: April 5 – 11
- Edition: 48th
- Category: WTA 500
- Draw: 56S / 16D
- Prize money: $565,530
- Surface: Green clay
- Location: Charleston, United States
- Venue: Family Circle Tennis Center

Champions

Singles
- (Russia) Veronika Kudermetova

Doubles
- (United States) Nicole Melichar / (Netherlands) Demi Schuurs
← 2020 ·	Charleston Open	· 2021 →

The 2021 Charleston Open (branded as the 2021 Volvo Car Open for sponsorship reasons) tournament was a women's professional tennis tournament played on outdoor clay courts at the Family Circle Tennis Center on Daniel Island in Charleston, South Carolina. It was the 48th edition of the event on the WTA Tour and was classified as a WTA 500 tournament on the 2021 WTA Tour. It was the first of two Charleston Open tournaments in consecutive weeks at the same facility (the second was the 2021 MUSC Health Women's Open), and were the only events of the annual tour's clay court season to be played on green clay. The first tournament of the 2021 doubleheader was the last to be sponsored by Chinese automaker Geely, the owner of Volvo Cars.

Due to the COVID-19 pandemic and local health guidelines impacting the facility's construction timeline, tournament organizers held the event behind closed doors for the second consecutive year after the preceding year's exhibition tournament was held under similar conditions. The main stadium was demolished in 2020 and tournament organizers had originally planned to host the event for up to 3,000 fans on a smaller temporary stadium on the secondary court, named the Althea Gibson Court.

Veronika Kudermetova won her maiden career WTA title in the singles tournament. Nicole Melichar and Demi Schuurs won their third title as a team in the doubles tournament.

== Champions ==
=== Singles ===
- (Russia) Veronika Kudermetova def. (Montenegro) Danka Kovinić, 6–4, 6–2

=== Doubles ===
- (United States) Nicole Melichar / (Netherlands) Demi Schuurs def. (Czech Republic) Marie Bouzková / (Czech Republic) Lucie Hradecká, 6–2, 6–4

== Points and prize money ==
=== Point distribution ===
Event	W	F	SF	QF	Round of 16	Round of 32	Round of 64	Q	Q2	Q1
Women's singles	470	305	185	100	55	30	1	25	13	1
Women's doubles	470	305	185	100	1	—	—	—	—	—

=== Prize money ===
Event	W	F	SF	QF	Round of 16	Round of 32	Round of 64	Q2	Q1
Women's singles	$68,570	$50,130	$26,745	$12,670	$6,480	$4,100	$3,330	$2,000	$1,020
Women's doubles	$25,230	$17,750	$10,000	$5,500	$3,500	—	—	—	—

== Singles main draw entrants ==
=== Seeds ===
Country	Player	Ranking^{1}	Seed
AUS	Ashleigh Barty	1	1
USA	Sofia Kenin	4	2
CZE	Petra Kvitová	10	3
~~NED~~	~~Kiki Bertens~~	~~11~~	~~4~~
SUI	Belinda Bencic	12	5
ESP	Garbiñe Muguruza	13	6
BEL	Elise Mertens	17	7
USA	Madison Keys	19	8
~~CZE~~	~~Markéta Vondroušová~~	~~21~~	~~9~~
KAZ	Elena Rybakina	24	10
TUN	Ons Jabeur	28	11
USA	Amanda Anisimova	31	12
KAZ	Yulia Putintseva	33	13
USA	Coco Gauff	36	14
RUS	Veronika Kudermetova	37	15
CHN	Zhang Shuai	43	16
CZE	Marie Bouzková	47	17

- ^{1} Rankings as of March 22, 2021.

=== Other entrants ===
The following players received wildcards into the main draw:

- (United States) Hailey Baptiste
- (Switzerland) Belinda Bencic
- (Czech Republic) Petra Kvitová
- (United States) Emma Navarro
- ~~(Czech Republic) Markéta Vondroušová~~

The following players received entry using a protected ranking into the main draw:

- ~~(Germany) Andrea Petkovic~~
- (Russia) Anastasia Potapova
- (Kazakhstan) Yaroslava Shvedova

The following players received entry from the qualifying draw:

- (Poland) Magdalena Fręch
- (United States) Desirae Krawczyk
- (United States) Grace Min
- (United States) Asia Muhammad
- (Japan) Kurumi Nara
- (Australia) Storm Sanders
- (Romania) Gabriela Talabă
- (Russia) Natalia Vikhlyantseva

The following players received entry as lucky losers:

- (United Kingdom) Harriet Dart
- (United States) Caroline Dolehide
- (United States) Whitney Osuigwe
- (China) Wang Xinyu

=== Withdrawals ===
Before the tournament

- (Romania) Irina-Camelia Begu → replaced by (Canada) Leylah Annie Fernandez
- (Netherlands) Kiki Bertens → replaced by (China) Wang Xinyu
- (Russia) Anna Blinkova → replaced by (Hungary) Tímea Babos
- (United States) Danielle Collins → replaced by (Italy) Martina Trevisan
- (France) Fiona Ferro → replaced by (Russia) Anastasia Potapova
- (Slovenia) Polona Hercog → replaced by (Japan) Nao Hibino
- (Estonia) Kaia Kanepi → replaced by (United States) Caroline Dolehide
- (Estonia) Anett Kontaveit → replaced by (United Kingdom) Harriet Dart
- (Czech Republic) Barbora Krejčíková → replaced by (Montenegro) Danka Kovinić
- (United States) Ann Li → replaced by (Japan) Misaki Doi
- (Latvia) Jeļena Ostapenko → replaced by (United States) Christina McHale
- (Russia) Anastasia Pavlyuchenkova → replaced by (Bulgaria) Tsvetana Pironkova
- (United States) Jessica Pegula → replaced by (Kazakhstan) Zarina Diyas
- (Sweden) Rebecca Peterson → replaced by (Mexico) Renata Zarazúa
- (Greece) Maria Sakkari → replaced by (United States) Francesca Di Lorenzo
- (Germany) Laura Siegemund → replaced by (Russia) Liudmila Samsonova
- (Czech Republic) Kateřina Siniaková → replaced by (United States) Lauren Davis
- (Switzerland) Jil Teichmann → replaced by (United States) Madison Brengle
- (Czech Republic) Markéta Vondroušová → replaced by (United States) Whitney Osuigwe
- (United Kingdom) Heather Watson → replaced by (United States) Caty McNally

=== Retirements ===
- (Spain) Garbiñe Muguruza
- (Kazakhstan) Elena Rybakina

== Doubles main draw entrants ==
=== Seeds ===
Country	Player	Country	Player	Rank^{1}	Seed
USA	Nicole Melichar	NED	Demi Schuurs	23	1
HUN	Tímea Babos	RUS	Veronika Kudermetova	30	2
CHN	Xu Yifan	CHN	Zhang Shuai	39	3
CHI	Alexa Guarachi	USA	Desirae Krawczyk	39	4

- ^{1} Rankings as of March 22, 2021.

=== Other entrants ===
The following pair received a wildcard into the doubles main draw:

- (United States) Caroline Dolehide / (United States) Emma Navarro

The following pairs received entry into the doubles main draw using protected rankings:

- (Georgia (country)) Oksana Kalashnikova / (Russia) Alla Kudryavtseva
- (United States) Vania King / (Kazakhstan) Yaroslava Shvedova
- (Australia) Ellen Perez / (United States) CoCo Vandeweghe

=== Withdrawals ===
Before the tournament

- (Australia) Ashleigh Barty / (Australia) Storm Sanders → replaced by (Japan) Misaki Doi / (Japan) Nao Hibino
- (Russia) Anna Blinkova / (Czech Republic) Lucie Hradecká → replaced by (Georgia (country)) Oksana Kalashnikova / (Russia) Alla Kudryavtseva

During the tournament

- (Hungary) Tímea Babos / (Russia) Veronika Kudermetova
- (United States) Coco Gauff / (United States) Caty McNally
