= 2022 Credit One Charleston Open =

- Date: April 4–10
- Edition: 50th
- Category: WTA 500
- Draw: 56S / 16D
- Prize money: $899,500
- Surface: Green clay / outdoor
- Location: Charleston, SC, United States
- Venue: Family Circle Tennis Center

Champions

Singles
- (Switzerland) Belinda Bencic

Doubles
- (Slovenia) Andreja Klepač / (Poland) Magda Linette
- Charleston Open

The 2022 Charleston Open (branded as the 2022 Credit One Charleston Open for sponsorship reasons) was a women's professional tennis tournament played on outdoor clay courts at the Family Circle Tennis Center on Daniel Island in Charleston, South Carolina. It was the 50th edition of the tournament on the WTA Tour and was classified as a WTA 500 tournament on the 2022 WTA Tour. It was the only event of the clay court season played on green clay.

== Champions ==
=== Singles ===
- (Switzerland) Belinda Bencic def. (Tunisia) Ons Jabeur, 6–1, 5–7, 6–4

=== Doubles ===
- (Slovenia) Andreja Klepač / (Poland) Magda Linette def. (Czech Republic) Lucie Hradecká / (India) Sania Mirza, 6–2, 4–6, [10–7]

== Points and prize money ==
=== Point distribution ===
Event	W	F	SF	QF	Round of 16	Round of 32	Round of 64	Q	Q2	Q1
Women's singles	470	305	185	100	55	30	1	25	13	1
Women's doubles	470	305	185	100	1	—N/a	—N/a	—N/a	—N/a	—N/a

=== Prize money ===
Event	W	F	SF	QF	Round of 16	Round of 32	Round of 64	Q2	Q1
Women's singles	$158,800	$98,190	$49,600	$19,400	$9,900	$5,420	$3,980	$2,400	$1,230
Women's doubles	$42,650	$25,900	$14,720	$7,650	$4,600	—N/a	—N/a	—N/a	—N/a

== Singles main draw entrants ==
=== Seeds ===
Country	Player	Rank^{1}	Seed
ANA	Aryna Sabalenka	5	1
ESP	Paula Badosa	6	2
CZE	Karolína Plíšková	8	3
TUN	Ons Jabeur	10	4
KAZ	Elena Rybakina	18	5
USA	Jessica Pegula	21	6
CAN	Leylah Fernandez	22	7
ANA	~~Veronika Kudermetova~~	~~23~~	~~8~~
USA	Madison Keys	26	9
SUI	Belinda Bencic	28	10
CZE	Petra Kvitová	32	11
FRA	Alizé Cornet	36	12
USA	Sloane Stephens	38	13
AUS	Ajla Tomljanović	39	14
USA	Amanda Anisimova	41	15
CHN	Zhang Shuai	43	16

- ^{1} Rankings as of March 21, 2022.

=== Other entrants ===
The following players received wildcards into the main draw:

- (Czech Republic) Linda Fruhvirtová
- (United States) Caty McNally
- (United States) Emma Navarro
- (Authorised Neutral Athletes) Aryna Sabalenka

The following player received entry using a protected ranking into the main draw:

- (Ukraine) Katarina Zavatska

The following players received entry from the qualifying draw:

- (United States) Robin Anderson
- (United States) Sophie Chang
- (United States) Francesca Di Lorenzo
- (Norway) Ulrikke Eikeri
- (Ukraine) Nadiia Kichenok
- (United States) Allie Kiick
- (Romania) Gabriela Lee
- (United States) Sachia Vickery

The following players received entry as lucky losers:

- (United States) CoCo Vandeweghe
- (United Kingdom) Heather Watson

=== Withdrawals ===
Before the tournament

- (United States) Danielle Collins → replaced by (United States) Alycia Parks
- (Romania) Simona Halep → replaced by Anastasia Gasanova
- Veronika Kudermetova → replaced by (United States) CoCo Vandeweghe
- (United States) Ann Li → replaced by (Ukraine) Katarina Zavatska
- (Czech Republic) Tereza Martincová → replaced by (China) Wang Xiyu
- (Spain) Garbiñe Muguruza → replaced by (United States) Claire Liu
- (Latvia) Jeļena Ostapenko → replaced by (United States) Hailey Baptiste
- (Spain) Nuria Párrizas Díaz → replaced by (China) Wang Xinyu
- (Germany) Andrea Petkovic → replaced by (Netherlands) Arianne Hartono
- (Netherlands) Arantxa Rus → replaced by (China) Yuan Yue
- (Egypt) Mayar Sherif → replaced by (Georgia (country)) Mariam Bolkvadze
- (Ukraine) Elina Svitolina → replaced by (Poland) Magdalena Fręch
- (Poland) Iga Świątek → replaced by (United Kingdom) Heather Watson

Retirements

- (United States) Madison Brengle (left knee injury)
- (Czech Republic) Petra Kvitová (left thigh injury)

== Doubles main draw entrants ==
=== Seeds ===
Country	Player	Country	Player	Rank^{1}	Seed
USA	Caroline Dolehide	CHN	Zhang Shuai	32	1
USA	Desirae Krawczyk	NED	Demi Schuurs	37	2
CHI	Alexa Guarachi	USA	Jessica Pegula	53	4
SLO	Andreja Klepač	POL	Magda Linette	58	4

- ^{1} Rankings as of March 21, 2022.

=== Other entrants ===
The following pair received a wildcard into the doubles main draw:

- (United States) Francesca Di Lorenzo / (United States) Katie Volynets

=== Withdrawals ===
Before the tournament

- (Ukraine) Lyudmyla Kichenok / (Latvia) Jeļena Ostapenko → replaced by (Ukraine) Lyudmyla Kichenok / (Australia) Anastasia Rodionova
- (Croatia) Darija Jurak Schreiber / (Slovenia) Andreja Klepač → replaced by (Slovenia) Andreja Klepač / (Poland) Magda Linette
- (Chile) Alexa Guarachi / (United States) Nicole Melichar-Martinez → replaced by (Kazakhstan) Anna Danilina / Aliaksandra Sasnovich
- (Poland) Magda Linette / (United States) Bernarda Pera → replaced by (Slovakia) Tereza Mihalíková / (Czech Republic) Květa Peschke
