= Paula Badosa =

Spanish tennis player (born 1997)

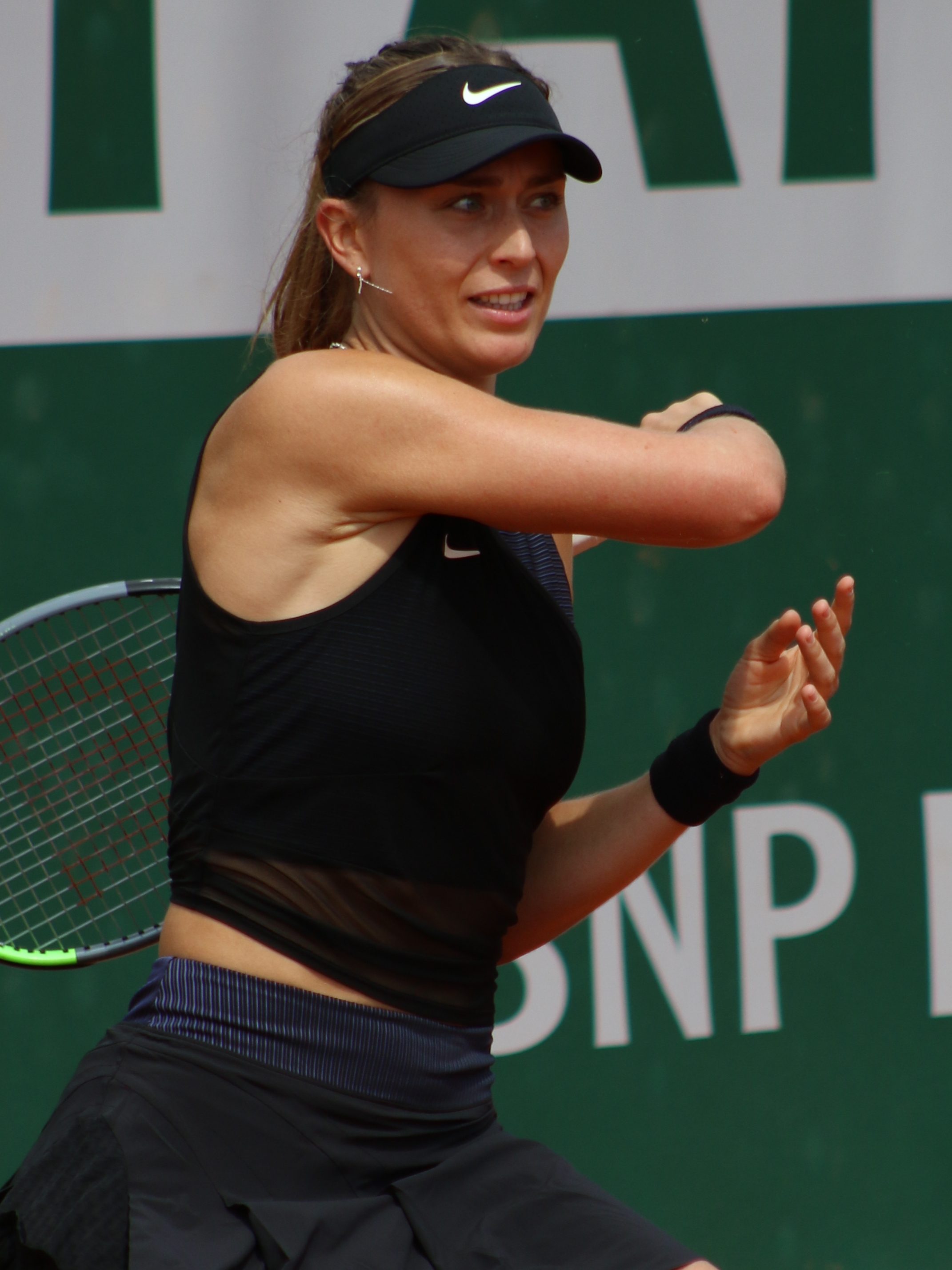
- Badosa at the 2021 French Open
- Country (sports): Spain
- Residence: Dubai, United Arab Emirates
- Born: 15 November 1997 (age 29) New York City, US
- Height: 1.80 m (5 ft 11 in)
- Turned pro: 2015
- Plays: Right-handed (two-handed backhand)
- Coach: -
- Prize money: US$ 10,077,299

Singles
- Career record: 402–229
- Career titles: 4
- Highest ranking: No. 2 (25 April 2022)
- Current ranking: No. 57 (9 November 2026)

Grand Slam singles results
- Australian Open: SF (2025)
- French Open: QF (2021)
- Wimbledon: 4R (2021, 2022, 2024)
- US Open: QF (2024)

Other tournaments
- Tour Finals: SF (2021)
- Olympic Games: QF (2021)

Doubles
- Career record: 27–24
- Career titles: 0
- Highest ranking: No. 124 (25 April 2022)
- Current ranking: No. 609 (13 July 2026)

Grand Slam doubles results
- Australian Open: 2R (2021)
- French Open: 1R (2020, 2021)
- Wimbledon: 2R (2021)

Other doubles tournaments
- Olympic Games: 2R (2021)

Grand Slam mixed doubles results
- French Open: 1R (2024)
- US Open: 1R (2024)

Team competitions
- Fed Cup: 2–2
- Last updated on: 14 September 2026.

Paula Badosa Gibert (Catalan: [ˈpawlə βəˈðozə ʒiˈβɛɾt]) (born 15 November 1997) is a Spanish professional tennis player. She has been ranked as high as world No. 2 in singles by the WTA and No. 124 in doubles, achieved on 25 April 2022. She has won four WTA Tour singles titles, including a WTA 1000 event in Indian Wells, and was a major semifinalist at the 2025 Australian Open.

As a junior, Badosa was ranked as high as No. 8 in the world and was the 2015 French Open junior champion. As a professional, she broke into the top 100 in 2019. The next year, a fourth round berth at the French Open brought her into the top 70. Badosa made new strides in 2021 after a breakthrough clay swing when she won her first career title in Belgrade. She entered the top ten following a WTA 1000 title at Indian Wells, and peaked at world No. 2 in early 2022. Subsequent injury struggles led Badosa dropping out of the world's top 100 in early 2024 before resurging in the latter half of the season, returning to the top 15 and being named the Comeback Player of the Year.

Badosa is an aggressive baseliner, whose game style is centered around her big serve and groundstrokes. At 1.80 m (5 ft 11 in), she possesses one of the fastest serves on tour, allowing her to dictate rallies, but she is also an athletic counterpuncher, whose defense has enabled her to reach drop shots and cover all angles on the court.

== Early life and background ==
Paula Badosa was born in Manhattan, New York, to Spanish parents Mireia Gibert Baró and Josep Badosa Codolar. Both of her parents worked in fashion. When she was seven, Badosa and her family moved back to Barcelona. She then started playing tennis, at Club Tennis d'Aro (Platja d'Aro). At the age of 14, she moved to Valencia in order to progress in tennis. At the age of 17, she returned to Barcelona.

Besides Spanish, she speaks Catalan, English and a little French. Her favourite tournament is the US Open. Her idols growing up were Rafael Nadal and Maria Sharapova. Badosa has also said she is a huge admirer of Simona Halep.

When she was a child she aspired to be a model, following her parents' path. She has struggled with depression and anxiety.

== Career ==
=== Juniors ===
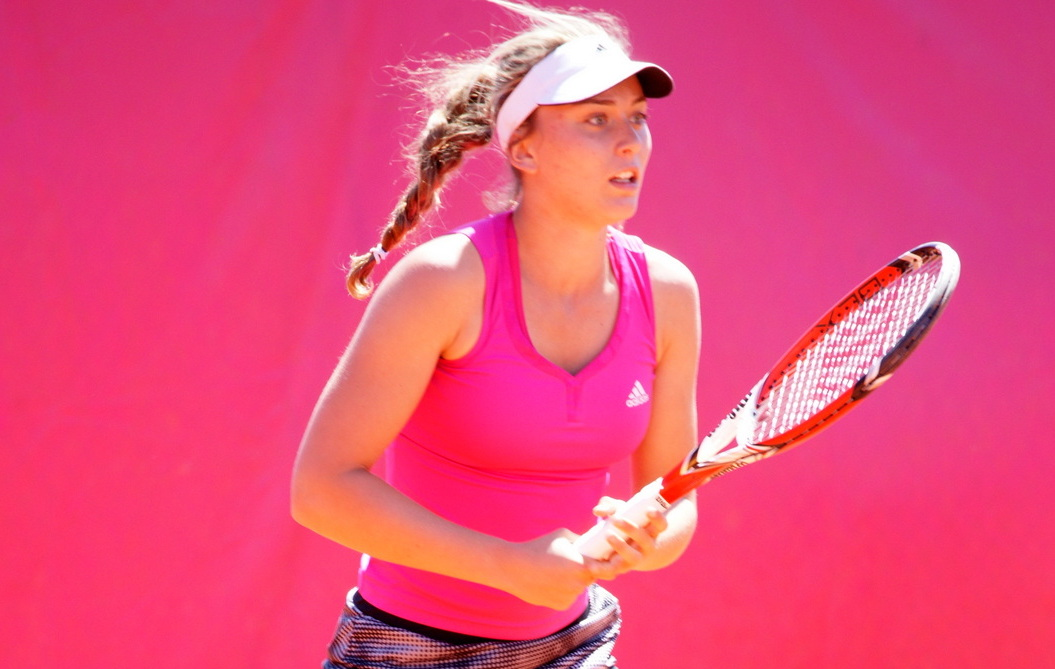
Badosa as junior in 2014

Badosa is a former junior world No. 8. She made her debut at the ITF Junior Circuit in September 2012, at the age of 14. In February 2014, she won her first junior singles title at the Grade-1 Mediterranee Avenir in Casablanca. In April 2014, she won the doubles title at a Grade-1 tournament, the Trofeo Juan Carlos Ferrero in Villena. In May 2014, she reached the semifinals of the Grade-A Trofeo Bonfiglio in doubles.

In the junior division of the 2014 French Open, she was able to reach the quarterfinals in both singles and doubles. She then reached the quarterfinals in the juniors division at Wimbledon in singles. She finished runner-up at the European Junior Championships in singles, losing to compatriot Sara Sorribes Tormo, and finished runner–up in doubles. She completed her junior career at the 2015 French Open, where she won the girls' singles title. In juniors she won three singles and one doubles titles on the circuit.

=== Professional ===
==== 2012–2020: Major main draw and top 100 debuts ====
Badosa made her debut on the ITF Women's Circuit in May 2012 in Getxo. In November 2013, she won her first title in Sant Jordi.

In March 2015, she made her first breakthrough after receiving a wildcard for the main draw at the Premier Mandatory Miami Open, where she recorded her first two match wins on the WTA Tour. In the third round, she lost to 14th seed Karolína Plíšková. Later, she entered the main draw of the Madrid Open through qualifying, but retired in her first-round match against Sara Errani.

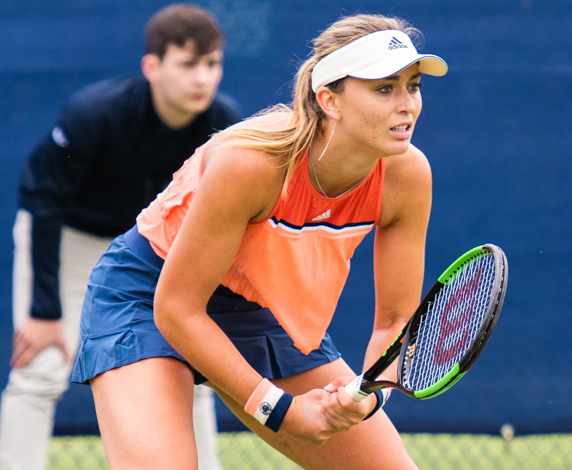
Badosa at the 2018 Nottingham Open

At the 2018 Morocco Open, she reached the quarterfinals and lost to Aleksandra Krunić. In September, she won the 60k Open de Valencia, defeating fellow Spaniard Aliona Bolsova in the final.

At the 2019 Australian Open, she made her major main-draw debut after passing qualifying; she lost to wildcard Kimberly Birrell in the first round. In July, she reached her first WTA Tour semifinal at the Palermo Ladies Open, but then lost to world No. 5, Kiki Bertens. She followed this by reaching the semifinals of the WTA 125 Karlsruhe Open and, as a result, the top 100. At the Korea Open, she advanced to the quarterfinals but then lost to Wang Yafan.

In the early 2020 season, Badosa recorded her first match-win in a Grand Slam tournament at the Australian Open, defeating qualifier Johanna Larsson in the first round. She then lost to world No. 7, Petra Kvitová. In September, she reached the semifinals at the İstanbul Cup, where she lost to Eugenie Bouchard. Her biggest result of the year was at the French Open, where she reached her first round of 16 at a major. There, she defeated two former Grand Slam champions, Sloane Stephens and Jeļena Ostapenko.

==== 2021: Indian Wells title, Roland Garros quarterfinal, top 10 ====
In May, Badosa reached her first WTA 1000 semifinal at the Madrid Open, making her the first Spanish woman to reach the semifinals in the tournament history, defeating No. 8 seed Belinda Bencic. She faced top seed and world No. 1, Ashleigh Barty, in the semifinals, where Barty got her revenge. As a result, Badosa reached a new career-high of world No. 42.

At the Serbia Open, she reached a third straight clay-court semifinal, defeating seventh seed Rebecca Peterson. As a result, she entered the top 40 for the first time in her career and went on to win her maiden title when Ana Konjuh retired injured in the final.

Initially unseeded at the French Open, she was promoted to seed No. 33 after the withdrawal of Alison Riske. Badosa beat Lauren Davis and Danka Kovinić in straight sets before facing Ana Bogdan. Having saved a match point in the second set, she went on to take the match in three sets to move into the fourth round of the French for the second year in a row. She then faced former finalist and 20th seed Markéta Vondroušová, whom she defeated in three sets to move into the quarterfinals of a major for the first time. Here, despite being up a break in the final set, she fell to Tamara Zidanšek.

Badosa represented Spain in the 2020 Summer Olympics women's singles and women's doubles events. Badosa and her partner Sara Sorribes Tormo beat Mexican pairing Giuliana Olmos and Renata Zarazúa in the first round, before losing in the second to Czech pairing and eventual gold medalists, Barbora Krejčíková and Kateřina Siniaková. In singles, Badosa won her first three matches against French Kristina Mladenovic, Polish Iga Świątek and Argentinian Nadia Podoroska. In her quarterfinal match against the eventual silver medalist, Czech Markéta Vondroušová, Badosa lost the first set before retiring from the match due to heatstroke caused by the hot, humid conditions in Tokyo – ultimately resulting in her having a long medical timeout and needing to leave the court via wheelchair. This, along with complaints from other tennis players such as Daniil Medvedev and Novak Djokovic, was the catalyst for Olympic officials to change the earliest start time for matches from 11 a.m. to 3 p.m.

On 12 August 2021, Badosa parted ways with her coach Javier Martí whom she had worked with for eleven months. This was announced a day, after suffering a loss against Rebecca Marino in the round of 16 of the Canadian Open. On 23 August 2021, following her second WTA 1000 quarterfinal at the Cincinnati Open where she defeated en route Petra Martić, third seed Aryna Sabalenka and Elena Rybakina, she reached a career-high in singles of world No. 26. On 17 October 2021, Badosa defeated former two-time champion Victoria Azarenka in a three-hour thriller match to win the Indian Wells tournament, for her first WTA 1000 title. Following this successful run, she made her top 10 debut on 8 November 2021. She qualified for the 2021 WTA Finals and was the first in her round-robin group to reach the semifinals.

==== 2022: Third WTA title, world No. 2 ====
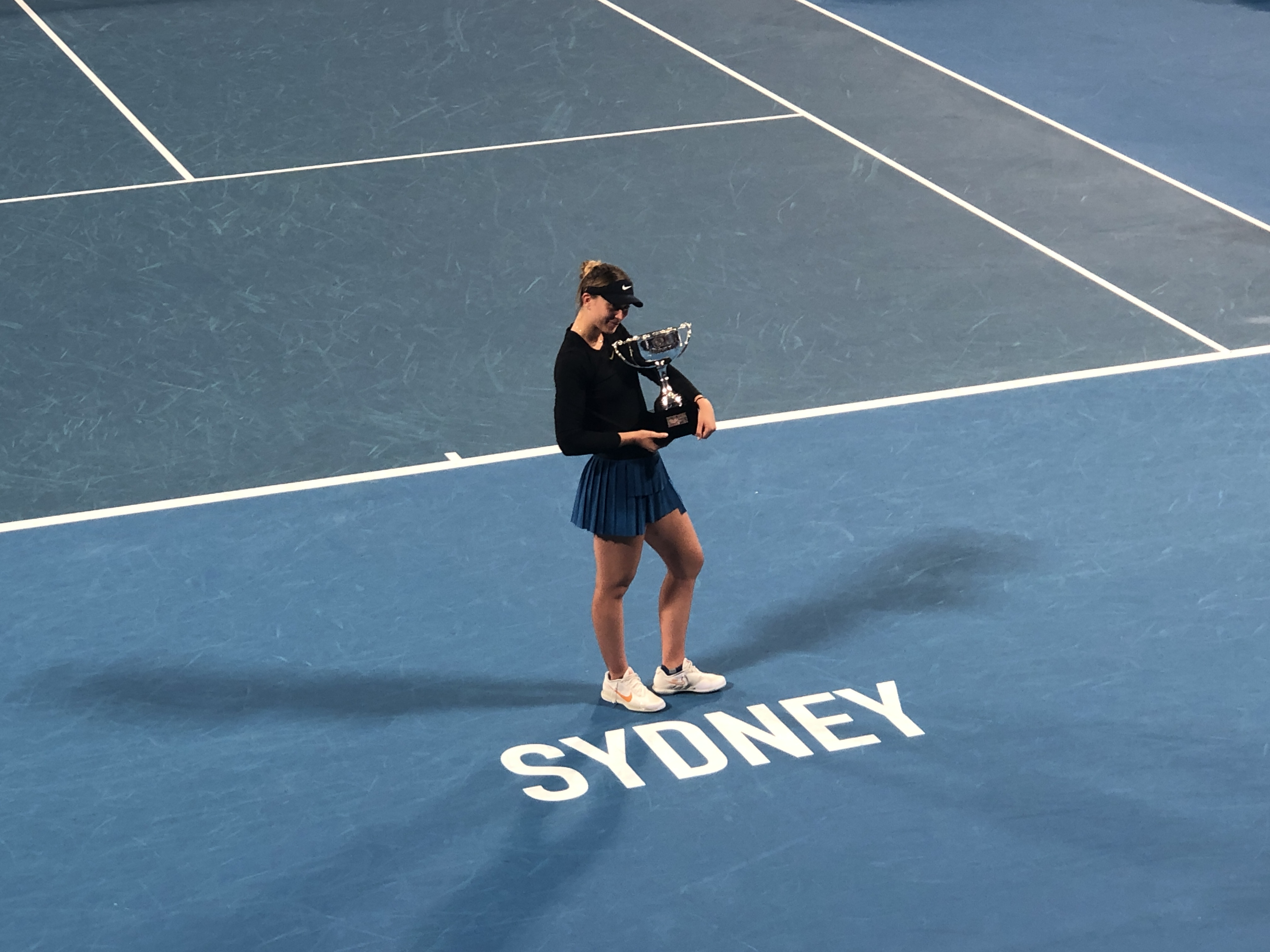
Third career title at the 2022 Sydney International

Badosa started the season at the Adelaide International 1, where she suffered a first round, straight sets loss to Victoria Azarenka in a rematch of the previous year Indian Wells final, with whom she reached the semifinals at doubles before Azarenka gave a walkover due to injury.

At the Sydney Tennis Classic, she defeated Jeļena Ostapenko, Ajla Tomljanović, Belinda Bencic and Daria Kasatkina to reach the final. She claimed her third title at WTA level defeating reigning French Open champion Barbora Krejčíková in three sets. With the win, she reached a new career-high ranking of No. 6.

At the Australian Open, she reached the second week for the first time in her career at this major with wins over Tomljanović, qualifier Martina Trevisan and Marta Kostyuk. She was defeated in the round of 16 by Madison Keys in straight sets, in a match where she clearly could not serve due to shoulder pain she sustained from the Kostyuk's match. This result, alongside Garbiñe Muguruza's second round exit while defending the points from the 2020 final, made Badosa the highest ranked Spanish player in the rankings for the first time in her career, making her top 5 debut the following week.

At Dubai, she lost in the first round to qualifier Elena-Gabriela Ruse in three sets, in a tournament where 7 out of the 8 seeds lost either in the first or the second round. Despite the early loss, she rose to a new career-high of No. 4 in the rankings. At the Qatar Ladies Open, she defeated Clara Tauson to reach the round of 16, losing to Coco Gauff in straight sets, falling to No. 6 in the rankings.

At Indian Wells, where she was the defending champion, she reached the semifinals with wins over Tereza Martincová, fellow Spaniard Sara Sorribes Tormo, US Open finalist Leylah Fernandez and Veronika Kudermetova. She lost to Maria Sakkari in three sets, failing to defend the Indian Wells title as every title holder had since Martina Navratilova defended it in 1991.

After the retirement of world No. 1, Ashleigh Barty, and her petition to be removed from the WTA rankings, Badosa started the Miami Open with the possibility of reaching the world No. 1 singles ranking at the end of the tournament alongside Iga Świątek. Świątek secured it as she only needed to win her opening match. With wins over Marie Bouzková and Yulia Putintseva, she reached the round of 16. Despite an illness, she managed to defeat Linda Fruhvirtová in straight sets to reach the quarterfinals against Jessica Pegula, in which she was forced to retire after five games due to that illness. With this result, she achieved a new career-high ranking of No. 3.

She started the clay-court swing at the Charleston Open, where she reached the quarterfinals with wins over Anna Bondár and Claire Liu. At the quarterfinals, she lost to eventual champion Belinda Bencic in three sets. The second set tie break in this match was the first tie break she lost since the Tokyo Olympics first round match against Kristina Mladenovic, having won 13 straight tie breaks to that date. At Stuttgart, she defeated Elena Rybakina and Ons Jabeur to reach the semifinals, losing to Aryna Sabalenka in straight sets. The win over Jabeur secured her career-high ranking of No. 2.

She arrived at her home tournament in Madrid as the co-favorite to win the title alongside Świątek, who was on a 23-match winning streak at that time. She got a very hard draw with her potential path to the final consisting of Veronika Kudermetova, Simona Halep, Coco Gauff, Jabeur and Sabalenka. Once Świątek withdrew due to injury, she was considered the clear favorite despite her draw. After having to save break points in 2 of her first three service games in the first round against Kudermetova, she won the last 9 games of the match to reach the second round, defeating the Russian in straight sets. In the second round, she was completely dominated by Halep, having to save two match points on serve to avoid the bagel in the second set. With that loss, which affected her a lot mentally, she dropped to no. 3 in the rankings, as she was defending the semifinals from the previous year, lasting only one week as world No. 2.

At the Italian Open, she reached the last 16 with a win over Aliaksandra Sasnovich, losing to Daria Kasatkina in straight sets. At the French Open, she secured wins over Fiona Ferro and Kaja Juvan, but a calf injury forced her to retire in the second set of her third round match against Kudermetova.

This injury made her miss the first two weeks of the grass-court season. She reappeared at the Eastbourne International, where she was the top seed at a tour-level tournament for the first time in her career. Despite showing an OK level giving all the circumstances, she lost in straight sets local wildcard Jodie Burrage in the second round. At Wimbledon, she picked up form as she cruised into the third round with wins over qualifier Louisa Chirico and Irina Bara. She made her Centre Court debut in the third round match against two-time champion Petra Kvitová. Despite going down a break early, and Kvitová having a break point for a double break lead in the first set, she defeated the Czech in straight sets to reach the last 16, where she lost once again to Simona Halep.

She started the US hardcourt swing by reaching the semifinals at the Silicon Valley Classic with wins over qualifier Elizabeth Mandlik and sixth seed Gauff, losing to eventual champion Kasatkina. At the Canadian Open, she retired in her first match against Putintseva, after losing the first set due to cramping. At the Cincinnati Open, she was defeated by Tomljanović in the second round in three sets, after the Aussie completely dominated the final two sets. At the US Open, she defeated Lesia Tsurenko in round one and won the first set in her second round match against Petra Martić, but lost the match as she got dominated again in the final two sets.

Bad results will continue for Badosa as she then lost in her first match at both Tokyo and Ostrava against Zheng Qinwen and Petra Kvitová, respectively. At the San Diego Open, she defeated qualifier Chirico to reach the quarterfinals, before losing to Danielle Collins in straight sets. With the 2021 Indian Wells points coming out of her ranking, she dropped to No. 8. At the last WTA 1000 of the season, the Guadalajara Open, she had to retire at the end of the first set of her match against Azarenka due to illness. With a 2–8 record since reaching the semifinals at the Silicon Valley Classic, and with the points of the 2021 WTA Finals coming out, she dropped out of the top 10 for the first time since she first enter it, to No. 12.

She ended her season playing the BJK Cup Finals at Glasgow for Spain. In the first tie against Kazakhstan, she defeated Rybakina in singles in three sets and, partnering Aliona Bolsova, Anna Danilina and Putintseva in doubles. In the second tie against Great Britain, she lost to Harriet Dart in straight sets, with Spain failing to advance to the knockout stage. She ended the year ranked No. 13.

==== 2023: United Cup, Multiple injuries, out of top 50 ====
She started the season representing Spain at the United Cup. She came back from a set down to defeat Harriet Dart in the first round-robin tie against Great Britain. She was scheduled to play the mixed doubles alongside Rafael Nadal, but both withdrew as Spain had already lost the tie. Despite being scheduled to play both singles and mixed doubles again against Australia, she did not take part in any of those matches as Spain had no chances of advancing to the knockout stage.

At the Adelaide International 2, she reached the semifinals with wins over Anett Kontaveit, lucky loser Kaia Kanepi and Beatriz Haddad Maia. She had to withdraw from her semifinal match against Daria Kasatkina due to a thigh injury. That injury made her miss the Australian Open, where she was scheduled to play Caty McNally in the first round, dropping outside of the top 20.

She recovered in time for the middle east swing, but had to withdraw from the Abu Dhabi Open ahead of her first round match against Liudmila Samsonova due to illness. At the Qatar Ladies Open, she suffered a straight sets first round loss to Haddad Maia. The following week at Dubai, Samsonova came back from a set down to defeat Badosa in the first round.

She arrived at Indian Wells without a coach, as she parted ways with Jorge Garcia. After a first round bye, she defeated compatriot Nuria Párrizas Díaz in straight sets, before losing to Australian Open finalist and eventual champion Elena Rybakina in straight sets. At the Miami Open, she defeated Laura Siegemund in the second round in a three-hour, three-set match, in a match where Siegemund took an 11-minute toilet break after losing the first set, and a long medical timeout in the middle of the third set that made Badosa had to warm up with a ball kid while waiting for the match to resume. In the third round, she had to play Rybakina again, losing in three sets despite having a match point in the second set. These early losses, while defending semifinals and quarterfinals from 2022, made her drop outside of the top 30 in the rankings.

She reached the quarterfinals at the Charleston Open, defeating Mayar Sherif, Leylah Fernandez and Diana Shnaider. She lost to first seed Jessica Pegula. Prior to the start of the Stuttgart Open, where she was awarded a main draw wildcard, she announced Pol Toledo and Edu Esteve as her new coaches. She later kept Toledo as her permanent coach. At the first round against Daria Kasatkina, she scored her first top 10 win of the season with a straightforward victory. She reached the quarterfinals with another routine win against fellow Spaniard Cristina Bucșa, where she lost to Aryna Sabalenka in three sets.

At her home tournament in Madrid, Badosa defeated Elisabetta Cocciaretto in three sets in her opening match. She scored her second top 10 win of the season in the third round with a win over Coco Gauff. She lost in the fourth round to Maria Sakkari, in straight sets. At the Italian Open, she defeated qualifier Anna-Lena Friedsam, Ons Jabeur, Marta Kostyuk and Karolína Muchová to reach the quarterfinals, losing to Jeļena Ostapenko in three sets. The win over Jabeur was her third and final top 10 win of the season.

During her second round match at the Italian Open against Jabeur, she suffered a stress fracture in the spine. This injury made her miss the French Open. Despite an estimated recovery time of 8 to 12 weeks, she recovered on time to play at Wimbledon. After a convincing first round win over Alison Riske-Amritraj, she had to retire from her second round match against Kostyuk as her back gave up and could not continue playing. She tried to came back at the Canadian Open first, where she was scheduled to play Haddad Maia, and at the US Open later, where she was scheduled to play Venus Williams. Three days before her first round match against Williams, she withdrew from the tournament and announce on social media that she was ending her season as, after trying multiple solutions, the pain in her back didn't let her compete.

Despite this announcement, she made herself available for the BJK Cup finals that were going to take place in Spain in November. Captain Anabel Medina Garrigues announced her as part of the team, but she end up not playing any matches with Spain getting eliminated in the group stage.

With no matches played since Wimbledon, Badosa ended the year ranked No. 66.

==== 2024: Major quarterfinal, Comeback Player of the Year ====
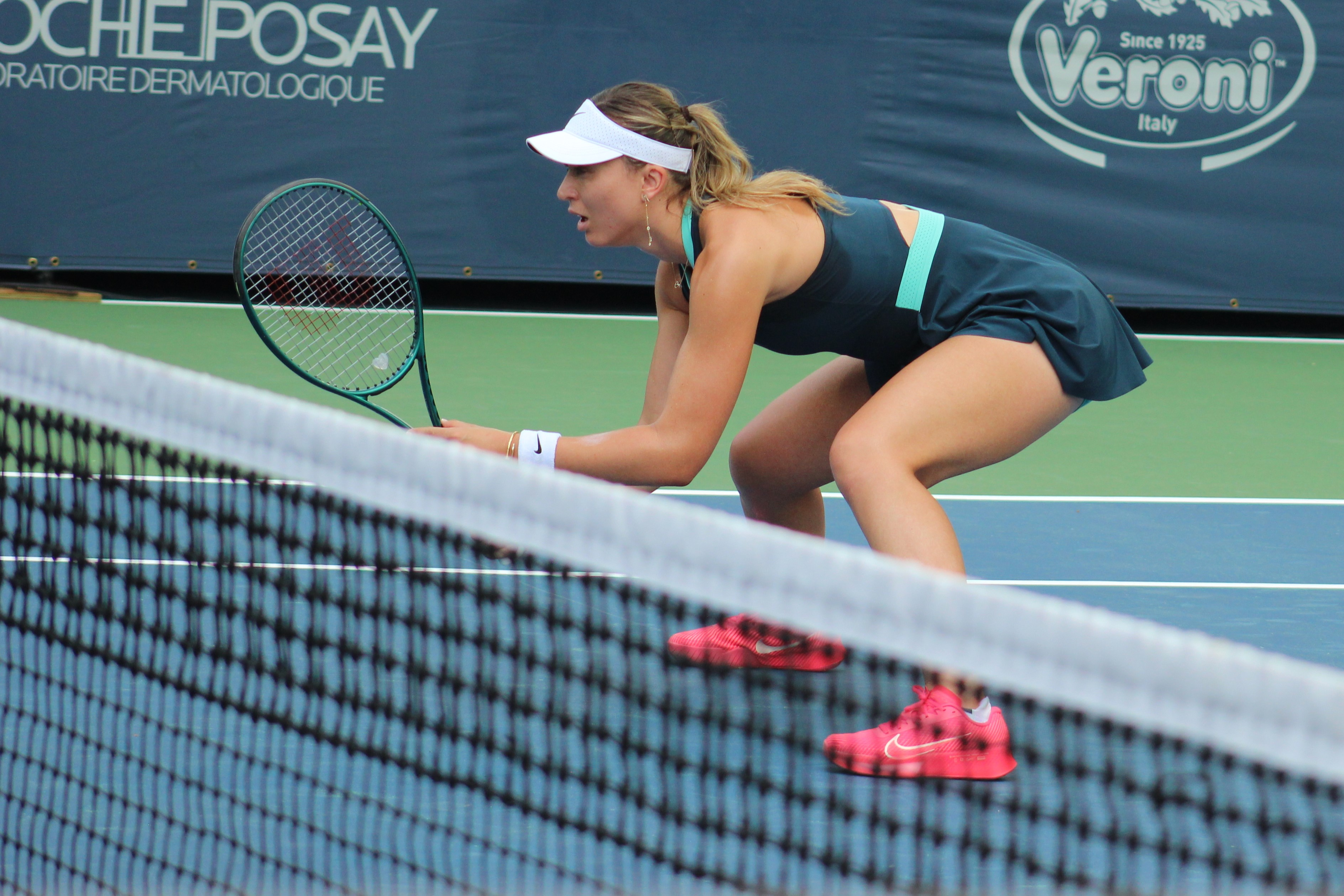
Badosa at the Mubadala Citi Open, July 2024

She came back from her chronic back injury at Adelaide in January thanks to a wildcard, where she lost in the first round to Bernarda Pera. Ranked No. 100, she reached the third round at the Australian Open with wins over Taylor Townsend and Anastasia Pavlyuchenkova, before losing in the third round to Amanda Anisimova.

At the Thailand Open, she beat local wildcard Lanlana Tararudee in the first round, before being forced to retire from her second round match against eventual champion, Diana Shnaider. This first injury setback made her withdraw from the Abu Dhabi Open where she was due to face Anhelina Kalinina in the first round.

She came back at the Qatar Ladies Open with a wildcard, defeating Ashlyn Krueger in a two-day rain delayed first round but losing in the second round to Leylah Fernandez. The following week, at Dubai, the back forced her to retire in tears, after the first set of her first round match against the -at that time- Swiss wildcard Lulu Sun. She ended the Middle East swing ranked No. 72.

This second injury setback made her miss San Diego. She was awarded a wildcard for Indian Wells, but had to withdraw ahead of her first-round match against Krueger, after the doctors told her it would be very complicated to continue her career, with regular cortisone shots being the solution to manage the pain. At the Miami Open, she was drawn in the first round against Simona Halep. This was the first tournament in over 18 months for the Romanian after her suspension for doping was cleared. Halep dominated the first set, just like she did their first two encounters back in 2022, but this time Badosa was able to turn the match around and secure a comeback win in three sets. She then lost in the second round to Aryna Sabalenka, ending the Sunshine Double ranked No. 82.

Badosa started the clay-court season with a first round loss to Miami champion Danielle Collins in straight sets at Charleston. At Stuttgart, she defeated qualifier Diana Shnaider in the first round. During her second round match against Sabalenka, their second encounter in less than a month, she suffered a tight injury late in the second set, forcing her to retire while tied in the final set and leave the court in tears. With that loss, Badosa fell out of the top 100, to No. 101, for the first time since she first entered it on 5 August 2019, after 226 weeks.

Despite the injury, she played at her home tournament in Madrid, suffering a shocking first round upset to fellow Spaniard Jéssica Bouzas Maneiro in three sets. With this loss, Badosa dropped to No. 126 in the rankings. With a 6–9 record, Madrid marked the lowest point of the season for her, considering the retirement as the results weren't coming and the back injury wasn't going away, as she went back to part of her 2021 team while looking for solutions.

Badosa started to turn around her season at the Italian Open, where she reached the round of 16 with wins over Mirra Andreeva, 21st seed Emma Navarro and Diana Shnaider, before losing to third seed Coco Gauff. Despite this result, she dropped even further in the rankings to No. 140. After a second round of cortisone shots, she reached the third round at the French Open with wins over 26th seed Katie Boulter and Yulia Putintseva, before losing in the third round to second seed Sabalenka in their third encounter of the season.

While she was looking forward to participate, with plans of playing at the Palermo Ladies Open as a warm-up tournament, Badosa had, after the French Open, to make the decision to skip the Paris Olympics as she didn't qualify based on the official rankings. With two uses of her protected ranking left, her ranking situation and the change of surfaces, playing the full North American swing would be better for her career.

A quarterfinals run at Bad Homburg, with wins over Arantxa Rus and local Jule Niemeier, before losing to eventual champion Diana Shnaider in their fourth encounter of the season, made Badosa return to the top 100 after ten weeks at No. 93. At Wimbledon, she reached the fourth round with wins over Karolína Muchová, Brenda Fruhvirtová and 14th seed Daria Kasatkina, before losing to eventual first time semifinalist Donna Vekić.

She received a wildcard for the Washington Open and reached the final with wins over major champions Sofia Kenin and Emma Raducanu, third seed Liudmila Samsonova and Caroline Dolehide. She won her fourth career title and her second at the WTA 500 level, with a three-set win over Marie Bouzková. She returned to the top 50 in the rankings on 5 August 2024 after 47 weeks, to No. 40.

At the Canadian Open, she defeated Clara Tauson in the first round before losing to Jeļena Ostapenko in the second round as she struggled with blisters throughout the match, requiring a medical timeout. At Cincinnati, she reached her first WTA 1000 semifinal since 2022 with wins over Peyton Stearns, 13th seed Anna Kalinskaya, Yulia Putintseva and Anastasia Pavlyuchenkova, all in straight sets, before losing to sixth seed Jessica Pegula.

At the US Open, Badosa reached the second Grand Slam quarterfinal of her career and the first at this major with wins over Viktorija Golubic, Taylor Townsend, qualifier Elena-Gabriela Ruse in a match that went to a deciding set tiebreak and Wang Yafan in straight sets in the round of 16. She lost in the last eight to Emma Navarro. As a result, she returned to the top 20 in the rankings.

At the China Open, she reached her second straight WTA 1000 semifinal with wins over Viktoriya Tomova; qualifier Rebecca Šramková, who was in a 9-match winning streak and had won 13 of her last 14 matches; world No. 3 and US Open finalist, Jessica Pegula and local wildcard Zhang Shuai, who was on a 24-match losing streak prior to the tournament. She lost to eventual champion Coco Gauff. Her fourth round win over Pegula was her 12th top 10 win, her first since defeating Ons Jabeur at the 2023 Italian Open and her third bagel against a top 10 player. With this result, she came back to the top 15 in the rankings for the first time since January 2023.

She withdrew from her first round match against Ajla Tomljanović at the Wuhan Open due to gastroenteritis. At the Ningbo Open, she defeated Diana Shnaider, in their fifth encounter of the season, and local wildcard Wang Xiyu, both from a set down, to reach the quarterfinals, where she scored her second top 10 win of the season with a win over Beatriz Haddad Maia. At the semifinals match against Kasatkina, which started two hours later than scheduled due to a rain delay, and had two additional delays in the first set, she retired due to an attack of dizziness before the start of the second set, after having her blood pressure checked by the doctors. She later announced she was withdrawing from the last WTA 500 of the season in Tokyo, where she was scheduled to play Katie Boulter in the first round, ending her WTA Tour season.

She finished the year at the BJK Cup Finals representing Spain. Prior to the tournament, she announced on social media that she will be donating half of the prize money from the tournament to the people affected by the DANA in Valencia. In the first round against Poland, she lost to world No. 2, Iga Świątek, in three sets. Spain failed to advanced to the quarterfinals as Sara Sorribes Tormo lost the first point of the tie to Magda Linette in a nearly four hours match.

After starting the season ranked No. 66, dropping as low as No. 140 in May and finished No. 12 in the year-end rankings, she won the WTA Comeback Player of the Year.

==== 2025: Major semifinal, return to top 10, back injury ====
Seeded 11th at the Australian Open, she defeated Wang Xinyu, wildcard entrant Talia Gibson, 17th seed Marta Kostyuk, Olga Danilović, and third seed Coco Gauff to reach her first ever major semifinal, which she lost to world No. 1, Aryna Sabalenka. Despite missing out on a place in the final, she returned into the top 10.

At the French Open, where she was the tenth seed, Badosa recorded wins over Naomi Osaka and Elena-Gabriela Ruse, before losing to 17th seed Daria Kasatkina in the third round.

She reached the quarterfinals at the Berlin Open but retired due to a back injury, after losing the first set against Wang Xinyu. Badosa lost to Katie Boulter in the first round at Wimbledon. She then missed the entire North American hardcourt swing, including the US Open, because of her ongoing back problems.

== Playing style ==
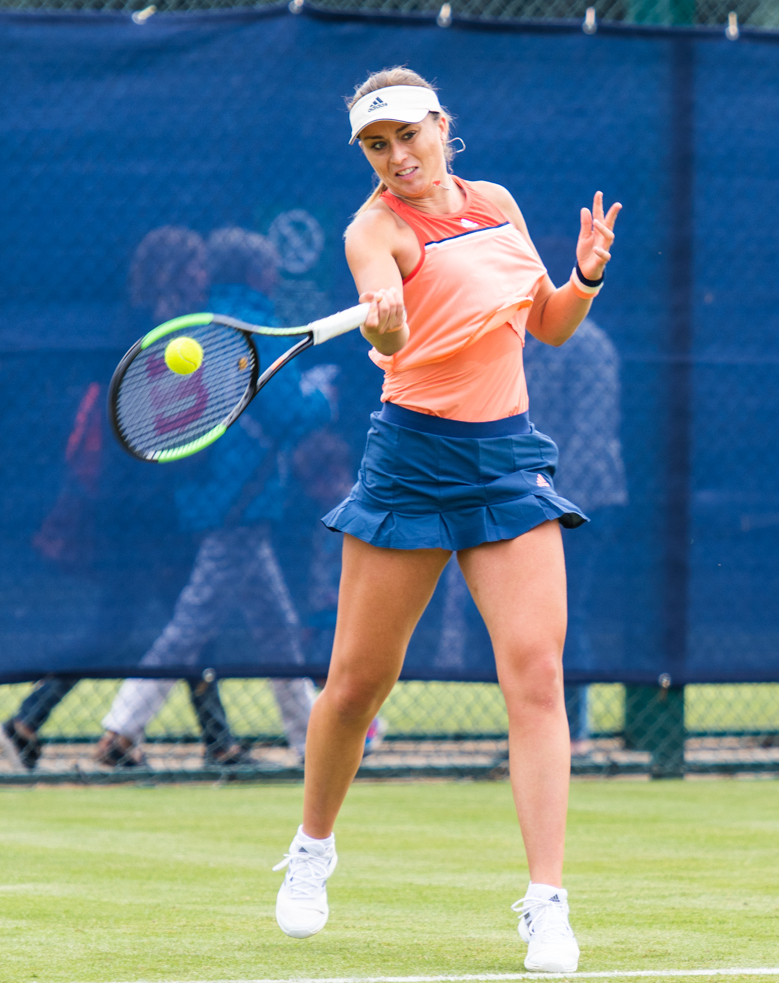
Badosa preparing for forehand shot at the 2018 Nottingham Open

Badosa is an aggressive baseliner whose game is centred around her powerful serve and groundstrokes. Badosa has described her serve as her favourite shot, with her serve being a major weapon. Her first serve has been recorded as high as 122 mph (196 km/h), allowing her to serve multiple aces in any given match, and to dictate play from the first stroke. Due to her effective first serve, she typically wins a high percentage of first serve points. She also possesses effective and reliable kick and slice serves that she deploys as second serves, preventing opponents from scoring free points off her second serve; she is also proficient at defending her second serve. When Badosa is nervous, however, she takes risks on her second serve, occasionally leading to a relatively high double fault count.

Badosa's strongest groundstroke is her two-handed backhand, with which she dominates opponents on the court, and she hits large numbers of winners with this shot. Badosa's forehand is also powerful, being hit with relentless depth and power; she frequently utilises the reverse forehand, also known as the 'buggy-whip' forehand, allowing her to generate extreme angles, and hit winners from defensive positions. Badosa likes to play short points, and will frequently utilise aggressive serve and groundstroke combinations to finish points quickly with outright winners.

Despite this, Badosa possesses a complete defensive game, with her movement, footwork, court coverage, and stamina allowing her to counterpunch, and to create opportunities to hit winners at the end of long rallies. She also possesses an effective drop shot, and will employ the sliced backhand to change the pace of rallies, and disrupt her opponent's rhythm. Badosa rarely approaches the net, except to retrieve short balls and drop shots; as she gains more doubles experience, however, she is beginning to attack the net with increasing frequency. She is also a formidable opponent on the court, known for her mental toughness, composure, and strength under pressure.

Badosa's favourite surface is clay, having grown up on the surface, and she has won 85% of her matches on clay courts throughout 2021, up to and including the French Open. Due to her aggressive playing style, clay court prowess, mental toughness, physical appearance, and the similarity in the mechanics of their serves, she has been frequently compared to her idol, Maria Sharapova.

=== Endorsements ===
Badosa is endorsed by Nike for clothing, shoes, and apparel, after having been previously endorsed by Adidas. Badosa is endorsed by Wilson for racquets, specifically using the Wilson Blade 98. She has also been signed as a brand ambassador for Iberdrola, a Spanish power company. In May, 2025, Badosa partnered with The 1916 Company to create a fully jewelry collection, called 'Aces'.

== Personal life ==
Between 2020 and 2021, Badosa was in a relationship with comedian and television host David Broncano.

Later, between 2021 and 2023, she was dating Cuban model Juan Betancourt.

As of May 2023, she was in a relationship with fellow tennis player Stefanos Tsitsipas. In May 2024, she announced on Instagram that they had amicably parted ways, but the couple reunited three weeks later. In July 2025, it was reported that they had split up.

=== Television and film ===
Badosa appeared in Season 1 of the tennis docuseries Break Point, which premiered on Netflix on 13 January 2023.

== Career statistics ==
=== Grand Slam singles performance timeline ===
Key
W	F	SF	QF	#R	RR	Q#	P#	DNQ	A	Z#	PO	G	S	B	NMS	NTI	P	NH

(W) winner; (F) finalist; (SF) semifinalist; (QF) quarterfinalist; (#R) rounds 4, 3, 2, 1; (RR) round-robin stage; (Q#) qualification round; (P#) preliminary round; (DNQ) did not qualify; (A) absent; (Z#) Davis/Fed Cup Zonal Group (with number indication) or (PO) play-off; (G) gold, (S) silver or (B) bronze Olympic/Paralympic medal; (NMS) not a Masters tournament; (NTI) not a Tier I tournament; (P) postponed; (NH) not held; (SR) strike rate (events won / competed); (W–L) win–loss record.
To avoid confusion and double counting, these charts are updated at the conclusion of a tournament or when the player's participation has ended.

Tournament	2015	...	2018	2019	2020	2021	2022	2023	2024	2025	2026	SR	W–L	Win %
Australian Open	A		A	1R	2R	1R	4R	A	3R	SF	2R	0 / 7	12–7	63%
French Open	A		A	Q1	4R	QF	3R	A	3R	3R	A	0 / 5	13–5	72%
Wimbledon	A		Q1	1R	NH	4R	4R	2R	4R	1R	1R	0 / 7	10–7	59%
US Open	Q2		Q2	1R	1R	2R	2R	A	QF	A	2R	0 / 6	7–6	54%
Win–loss	0–0		0–0	0–3	4–3	8–4	9–4	1–1	11–4	7–3	2–3	0 / 25	42–25	63%
