= 2021 Abierto Zapopan – Singles =

Singles
- 2021 Abierto Zapopan

Final
- Champion: (Spain) Sara Sorribes Tormo
- Runner-up: (Canada) Eugenie Bouchard
- Score: 6–2, 7–5

Details
- Draw: 32 (6 Q / 3 WC)
- Seeds: 8

Events
Singles	Doubles
← 2019 ·	Abierto Zapopan	· 2022 →

Veronika Kudermetova was the defending champion from 2019, when the tournament was last held as a WTA 125K series event, but she chose to compete in Dubai instead.

Sara Sorribes Tormo won her first WTA Tour singles title, defeating Eugenie Bouchard in the final, 6–2, 7–5.

== Seeds ==
1. (Argentina) Nadia Podoroska (second round)
2. (Czech Republic) Marie Bouzková (semifinals)
3. (Russia) Anna Blinkova (first round)
4. (Spain) Sara Sorribes Tormo (champion)
5. (Japan) Nao Hibino (first round)
6. (Montenegro) Danka Kovinić (second round)
7. (Canada) Leylah Annie Fernandez (second round)
8. (Slovenia) Kaja Juvan (second round)

== Draw ==
=== Key ===
- Q = Qualifier
- WC = Wild card
- LL = Lucky loser
- Alt = Alternate
- SE = Special exempt
- PR = Protected ranking
- ITF = ITF entry
- JE = Junior exempt
- w/o = Walkover
- r = Retired
- d = Defaulted
- SR = Special ranking

=== Finals ===
Semifinals
Q	(Italy) Elisabetta Cocciaretto	2	6^{2}
WC	(Canada) Eugenie Bouchard	6	7^{7}
4	(Spain) Sara Sorribes Tormo	6	7^{7}
2	(Czech Republic) Marie Bouzková	3	6^{3}

Final
WC	(Canada) Eugenie Bouchard	2	5
4	(Spain) Sara Sorribes Tormo	6	7

=== Top half ===
First round
1	(Argentina) N Podoroska	7^{10}	3	6
Q	(Mexico) G Olmos	6^{8}	6	2
Q	(Italy) E Cocciaretto	6	6
(China) Xiy Wang	4	4
Q	(United States) L Davis	7	6
(Germany) A-L Friedsam	5	4
(Russia) V Gracheva	6	4	5
6	(Montenegro) D Kovinić	3	6	7
3	(Russia) A Blinkova	3	5
(Slovenia) T Zidanšek	6	7
(United States) C McNally	6	3	6
WC	(United States) K Volynets	0	6	4
WC	(Canada) E Bouchard	3	6	6
Q	(United States) C Dolehide	6	1	3
(Spain) A Bolsova	5	6^{5}
8	(Slovenia) K Juvan	7	7^{7}

Second round
1	(Argentina) N Podoroska	5	5
Q	(Italy) E Cocciaretto	7	7
Q	(United States) L Davis	6	6
6	(Montenegro) D Kovinić	2	2
(Slovenia) T Zidanšek	4	7^{7}	4
(United States) C McNally	6	6^{4}	6
WC	(Canada) E Bouchard	6	6
8	(Slovenia) K Juvan	4	3

Quarterfinals
Q	(Italy) E Cocciaretto	6	6
Q	(United States) L Davis	3	0
(United States) C McNally	4	3
WC	(Canada) E Bouchard	6	6

Semifinals
Q	(Italy) E Cocciaretto	2	6^{2}
WC	(Canada) E Bouchard	6	7^{7}

=== Bottom half ===
First round
7	(Canada) LA Fernandez	7	4	6
(Russia) A Kalinskaya	5	6	4
Q	(Australia) A Sharma	2	6	7^{7}
LL	(United Kingdom) H Dart	6	2	6^{2}
Q	(Switzerland) L Küng	6	6
(Serbia) N Stojanović	2	3
(Belgium) G Minnen	7^{7}	4	1
4	(Spain) S Sorribes Tormo	6^{4}	6	6
5	(Japan) N Hibino	1	5
PR	(Slovakia) AK Schmiedlová	6	7
WC	(Mexico) R Zarazúa	7^{9}	6
(Poland) K Kawa	6^{7}	0
PR	(United States) C Vandeweghe	6^{4}	7^{7}	2
PR	(Romania) M Buzărnescu	7^{7}	6^{5}	6
(Romania) I Bara	3	6	3
2	(Czech Republic) M Bouzková	6	2	6

Second round
7	(Canada) LA Fernandez	4	4
Q	(Australia) A Sharma	6	6
Q	(Switzerland) L Küng	3	3
4	(Spain) S Sorribes Tormo	6	6
PR	(Slovakia) AK Schmiedlová	6	5	6
WC	(Mexico) R Zarazúa	3	7	1
PR	(Romania) M Buzărnescu	3	2
2	(Czech Republic) M Bouzková	6	6

Quarterfinals
Q	(Australia) A Sharma	3	3
4	(Spain) S Sorribes Tormo	6	6
PR	(Slovakia) AK Schmiedlová	4	2
2	(Czech Republic) M Bouzková	6	6

Semifinals
4	(Spain) S Sorribes Tormo	6	7^{7}
2	(Czech Republic) M Bouzková	3	6^{3}

== Qualifying ==
=== Seeds ===
1. (United States) Lauren Davis (qualified)
2. (Italy) Sara Errani (first round)
3. (Egypt) Mayar Sherif (first round)
4. (Italy) Elisabetta Cocciaretto (qualified)
5. (Australia) Astra Sharma (qualified)
6. (Belarus) Olga Govortsova (qualifying competition)
7. (Slovakia) Kristína Kučová (first round)
8. (United Kingdom) Harriet Dart (qualifying competition, lucky loser)
9. (United States) Caroline Dolehide (qualified)
10. (United States) Usue Maitane Arconada (qualifying competition)
11. (Switzerland) Leonie Küng (qualified)
12. (United States) Sachia Vickery (first round)

=== Qualifiers ===
1. (United States) Lauren Davis
2. (Switzerland) Leonie Küng
3. (Mexico) Giuliana Olmos
4. (Italy) Elisabetta Cocciaretto
5. (Australia) Astra Sharma
6. (United States) Caroline Dolehide

=== Lucky loser ===
1. (United Kingdom) Harriet Dart

=== Draw ===
==== First qualifier ====
First round
1	(United States) Lauren Davis	4	6	6
(Spain) Lara Arruabarrena	6	4	4
(Slovenia) Dalila Jakupović	3	6	3
10	(United States) Usue Maitane Arconada	6	2	6

Qualifying competition
1	(United States) Lauren Davis	6	6
10	(United States) Usue Maitane Arconada	1	0

==== Second qualifier ====
First round
2	(Italy) Sara Errani	6	4	3
(India) Ankita Raina	2	6	6
(Japan) Kyōka Okamura	2	0
11	(Switzerland) Leonie Küng	6	6

Qualifying competition
(India) Ankita Raina	0	1
11	(Switzerland) Leonie Küng	6	6

==== Third qualifier ====
First round
3	(Egypt) Mayar Sherif	3	4
WC	(Mexico) Giuliana Olmos	6	6
(Mexico) Marcela Zacarías	6	6
12	(United States) Sachia Vickery	2	1

Qualifying competition
WC	(Mexico) Giuliana Olmos	7	4	7^{7}
(Mexico) Marcela Zacarías	5	6	6^{3}

==== Fourth qualifier ====
First round
4	(Italy) Elisabetta Cocciaretto	6	3	6
(Japan) Mayo Hibi	3	6	4
(United States) Varvara Lepchenko	7^{7}	6
7	(Slovakia) Kristína Kučová	6^{5}	4

Qualifying competition
4	(Italy) Elisabetta Cocciaretto	7^{7}	6
(United States) Varvara Lepchenko	6^{1}	4

==== Fifth qualifier ====
First round
5	(Australia) Astra Sharma	6	6
(Japan) Kurumi Nara	1	1
WC	(United States) Ashlyn Krueger	2	3
8	(United Kingdom) Harriet Dart	6	6

Qualifying competition
5	(Australia) Astra Sharma	6	6
8	(United Kingdom) Harriet Dart	3	2

==== Sixth qualifier ====
First round
6	(Belarus) Olga Govortsova	6	6
(Poland) Katarzyna Piter	0	2
(Australia) Ellen Perez	3	7	4
9	(United States) Caroline Dolehide	6	5	6

Qualifying competition
6	(Belarus) Olga Govortsova	6^{4}	7	6^{2}
9	(United States) Caroline Dolehide	7^{7}	5	7^{7}
