= 2021 Tenerife Ladies Open =

Tennis event in Spain

- Date: 18–24 October
- Edition: 1st
- Category: WTA 250
- Draw: 32S / 16Q / 16D
- Prize money: $235,238
- Surface: Hard
- Location: Guía de Isora, Tenerife, Spain
- Venue: Abama Tennis Academy

Champions

Singles
- (United States) Ann Li

Doubles
- (Norway) Ulrikke Eikeri / (Australia) Ellen Perez
Tenerife Ladies Open	· 2022 →

The 2021 Tenerife Ladies Open was a women's tennis tournament played on outdoor hard courts. It was the first edition of the Tenerife Ladies Open, and part of the WTA 250 series of the 2021 WTA Tour. It was held at the Abama Tennis Academy in Guía de Isora, Spain, from 18 until 24 October 2021.

== Champions ==
=== Singles ===
- (United States) Ann Li def. (Colombia) Camila Osorio 6–1, 6–4

This is Li's first career WTA title.

=== Doubles ===
- (Norway) Ulrikke Eikeri / (Australia) Ellen Perez def. (Ukraine) Lyudmyla Kichenok / (Ukraine) Marta Kostyuk, 6–3, 6–3

== Singles main draw entrants ==
=== Seeds ===
Country	Player	Rank^{1}	Seed
UKR	Elina Svitolina	7	1
SLO	Tamara Zidanšek	33	2
ESP	Sara Sorribes Tormo	35	3
ITA	Camila Giorgi	38	4
SUI	Viktorija Golubic	46	5
CHN	Zhang Shuai	48	6
DEN	Clara Tauson	49	7
USA	Alison Riske	51	8

- Rankings are as of October 4, 2021.

=== Other entrants ===
The following players received wildcards into the main draw:

- (Spain) Rebeka Masarova
- (Spain) Nuria Párrizas Díaz
- (Italy) Lucrezia Stefanini

The following player received entry using a protected ranking:

- (China) Zheng Saisai

The following players received entry from the qualifying draw:

- (Spain) Aliona Bolsova
- (Romania) Jaqueline Cristian
- (Luxembourg) Mandy Minella
- (Croatia) Donna Vekić
- (Switzerland) Stefanie Vögele
- (China) Wang Xinyu

The following player received entry as a lucky loser:

- (Slovenia) Kaja Juvan

=== Withdrawals ===
Before the tournament

- (France) Caroline Garcia → replaced by (Netherlands) Arantxa Rus
- (Poland) Magda Linette → replaced by (Belgium) Greet Minnen
- (Italy) Jasmine Paolini → replaced by (Montenegro) Danka Kovinić
- (Sweden) Rebecca Peterson → replaced by (Slovenia) Kaja Juvan
- (Italy) Martina Trevisan → replaced by (Russia) Varvara Gracheva

== Doubles main draw entrants ==
=== Seeds ===
Country	Player	Country	Player	Rank^{1}	Seed
CRO	Darija Jurak	SLO	Andreja Klepač	43	1
JPN	Eri Hozumi	CHN	Zhang Shuai	91	2
UKR	Lyudmyla Kichenok	UKR	Marta Kostyuk	122	3
NOR	Ulrikke Eikeri	AUS	Ellen Perez	127	4

- Rankings are as of October 4, 2021.

=== Other entrants ===
The following pairs received wildcards into the doubles main draw:

- (Spain) Paula Arias Manjón / (Spain) Sara Sorribes Tormo
- (Italy) Cristiana Ferrando / (Italy) Lucrezia Stefanini

The following pair received entry using a protected ranking:

- (Indonesia) Beatrice Gumulya / (Thailand) Peangtarn Plipuech

=== Withdrawals ===
Before the tournament

- (Belgium) Kirsten Flipkens / (Chinese Taipei) Hsieh Su-wei → replaced by (United States) Emina Bektas / (United Kingdom) Tara Moore
- (Germany) Vivian Heisen / (Belgium) Kimberley Zimmermann → replaced by (Germany) Vivian Heisen / (Romania) Andreea Mitu
- (Belgium) Greet Minnen / (Belgium) Alison Van Uytvanck → replaced by (Indonesia) Beatrice Gumulya / (Thailand) Peangtarn Plipuech
- (Romania) Andreea Mitu / (Netherlands) Lesley Pattinama Kerkhove → replaced by (Hungary) Anna Bondár / (Hungary) Dalma Gálfi
