= 2022 Abierto Zapopan =

- Date: 21–27 February
- Edition: 3rd
- Category: WTA 250
- Draw: 32S / 16D
- Prize money: $239,477
- Surface: Hard
- Location: Guadalajara, Mexico
- Venue: Panamerican Tennis Center

Champions

Singles
- (United States) Sloane Stephens

Doubles
- (United States) Kaitlyn Christian / (Belarus) Lidziya Marozava
- Abierto Zapopan

The 2022 Abierto Zapopan, also known as Abierto Akron Zapopan, was a professional tennis tournament played on outdoor hardcourts. It was the 3rd edition of the tournament and part of the 2022 WTA Tour.

It took place in Guadalajara, Mexico from 21 to 27 February 2022 and part of the WTA 250 tournaments.

== Champions ==
=== Singles ===
- (United States) Sloane Stephens def. (Czech Republic) Marie Bouzková 7–5, 1–6, 6–2

=== Doubles ===
- (United States) Kaitlyn Christian / (Belarus) Lidziya Marozava def. (China) Wang Xinyu / (China) Zhu Lin, 7–5, 6–3

== Point distribution and prize money ==
=== Point distribution ===
Event	W	F	SF	QF	Round of 16	Round of 32	Q	Q2	Q1
Singles	280	180	110	60	30	1	18	12	1
Doubles	280	180	110	60	1	—N/a	—N/a	—N/a	—N/a

== Singles main draw entrants ==
=== Seeds ===
Country	Player	Rank¹	Seed
GBR	Emma Raducanu	12	1
USA	Madison Keys	27	2
ESP	Sara Sorribes Tormo	32	3
COL	Camila Osorio	47	4
ESP	Nuria Párrizas Díaz	48	5
USA	Sloane Stephens	56	6
JPN	Misaki Doi	75	7
CHN	Zheng Qinwen	79	8

¹ Rankings are as of 14 February 2022.

=== Other entrants ===
The following players received wildcards into the singles main draw:

- (United States) Caty McNally
- (United States) Katie Volynets
- (Mexico) Renata Zarazúa

The following player received entry using a protected ranking into the singles main draw:

- (Australia) Daria Saville

The following players received entry from the qualifying draw:

- (United States) Hailey Baptiste
- (Italy) Lucia Bronzetti
- (United States) Caroline Dolehide
- (Czech Republic) Brenda Fruhvirtová
- (Slovakia) Viktória Kužmová
- (Spain) Rebeka Masarova

=== Withdrawals ===
Before the tournament

- (Sweden) Rebecca Peterson → replaced by (Bulgaria) Viktoriya Tomova
- (China) Zheng Saisai → replaced by (China) Zhu Lin

Retirements

- (United Kingdom) Emma Raducanu (left hip injury)
- (Ukraine) Lesia Tsurenko (left elbow injury)
- (Russia) Anna Kalinskaya (back injury)

== Doubles main draw entrants ==
=== Seeds ===
Country	Player	Country	Player	Rank^{1}	Seed
FRA	Elixane Lechemia	USA	Ingrid Neel	153	1
~~USA~~	~~Hailey Baptiste~~	~~USA~~	~~Caty McNally~~	~~156~~	~~2~~
USA	Kaitlyn Christian	BLR	Lidziya Marozava	189	2
USA	Catherine Harrison	USA	Sabrina Santamaria	197	4

¹ Rankings are as of 14 February 2022.

=== Other entrants ===
The following pairs received wildcards into the doubles main draw:

- (Italy) Lucia Bronzetti / (Italy) Sara Errani
- (Brazil) Laura Pigossi / (Mexico) Renata Zarazúa

The following pair received entry as alternates:

- (China) Wang Xinyu / (China) Zhu Lin

=== Withdrawals ===
Before the tournament

- (United States) Hailey Baptiste / (United States) Caty McNally → replaced by (China) Wang Xinyu / (China) Zhu Lin
- (Sweden) Rebecca Peterson / (Russia) Anastasia Potapova → replaced by (Japan) Misaki Doi / (Japan) Miyu Kato
