= Tenerife Ladies Open =

There are two sporting events known as the Tenerife Ladies Open:

- Tenerife Ladies Open (golf), a women's golf tournament played from 2002–2011
- Tenerife Ladies Open (tennis), a women's tennis event played from 2021–present
