= 2022 Abierto Zapopan – Doubles =

Doubles
- 2022 Abierto Zapopan

Final
- Champions: (United States) Kaitlyn Christian (Belarus) Lidziya Marozava
- Runners-up: (China) Wang Xinyu (China) Zhu Lin
- Score: 7–5, 6–3

Events
Singles	Doubles
← 2021 ·	Abierto Zapopan	· 2024 →

Kaitlyn Christian and Lidziya Marozava defeated Wang Xinyu and Zhu Lin in the final, 7–5, 6–3 to win the doubles tennis title at the 2022 Abierto Zapopan.

Ellen Perez and Astra Sharma were the reigning champions, but Sharma chose not to compete and Perez competed in Doha instead.

== Seeds ==
1. (France) Elixane Lechemia / (United States) Ingrid Neel (quarterfinals)
2. (United States) Hailey Baptiste / (United States) Caty McNally (withdrew)
3. (United States) Kaitlyn Christian / (Belarus) Lidziya Marozava (champions)
4. (United States) Catherine Harrison / (United States) Sabrina Santamaria (first round)

== Draw ==
=== Key ===
- Q = Qualifier
- WC = Wild card
- LL = Lucky loser
- Alt = Alternate
- SE = Special exempt
- PR = Protected ranking
- ITF = ITF entry
- JE = Junior exempt
- w/o = Walkover
- r = Retired
- d = Defaulted
- SR = Special ranking

=== Draw ===
First round
1	(France) E Lechemia (United States) I Neel	6	7
(United Kingdom) E Silva (Belgium) K Zimmermann	2	5
(Japan) M Doi (Japan) M Kato	6	4	[10]
(Hungary) D Gálfi (Spain) N Párrizas Díaz	3	6	[5]
3	(United States) K Christian (Belarus) L Marozava	6	6
WC	(Italy) L Bronzetti (Italy) S Errani	2	1
(Japan) N Hibino (Poland) P Kania-Choduń	2	7	[10]
(Colombia) C Osorio (Hungary) P Udvardy	6	5	[5]
PR	(China) X Han (Russia) Y Sizikova	7^{7}	4	[8]
(United States) E Bektas (United Kingdom) T Moore	6^{5}	6	[10]
(Spain) S Sorribes Tormo (United States) S Stephens	6	6
4	(United States) C Harrison (United States) S Santamaria	2	3
(Thailand) P Plipuech (Indonesia) A Sutjiadi	6	4	[10]
WC	(Brazil) L Pigossi (Mexico) R Zarazúa	4	6	[7]
(Ukraine) K Bondarenko (Poland) K Piter	4	6	[8]
Alt	(China) Xin Wang (China) L Zhu	6	4	[10]

Quarterfinals
1	(France) E Lechemia (United States) I Neel	6	6^{6}	[4]
(Japan) M Doi (Japan) M Kato	1	7^{8}	[10]
3	(United States) K Christian (Belarus) L Marozava	4	7	[10]
(Japan) N Hibino (Poland) P Kania-Choduń	6	5	[8]
(United States) E Bektas (United Kingdom) T Moore	6	2	[11]
(Spain) S Sorribes Tormo (United States) S Stephens	4	6	[9]
(Thailand) P Plipuech (Indonesia) A Sutjiadi	6^{3}	2
Alt	(China) Xin Wang (China) L Zhu	7^{7}	6

Semifinals
(Japan) M Doi (Japan) M Kato	2	3
3	(United States) K Christian (Belarus) L Marozava	6	6
(United States) E Bektas (United Kingdom) T Moore	4	0
Alt	(China) Xin Wang (China) L Zhu	6	6

Final
3	(United States) K Christian (Belarus) L Marozava	7	6
Alt	(China) Xin Wang (China) L Zhu	5	3
