= WTA Guadalajara =

WTA Guadalajara may refer to:

- Abierto Zapopan (2021–2022)
- Guadalajara Open Akron (2022–present)
