= 2025 Guadalajara 125 Open – Doubles =

Doubles
- 2025 Guadalajara 125 Open

Final
- Champions: Maria Kozyreva; Iryna Shymanovich
- Runners-up: Irina Khromacheva; Kamilla Rakhimova
- Score: 6–3, 6–4

Events
Singles	Doubles
← 2024 ·	Abierto Zapopan	· 2026 →

Maria Kozyreva and Iryna Shymanovich won the title, defeating Irina Khromacheva and Kamilla Rakhimova in the final, 6–3, 6–4.

Katarzyna Piter and Fanny Stollár were the reigning champions, but Stollár chose not to compete this year. Piter partnered Tang Qianhui but lost in the semifinals to Kozyreva and Shymanovich.

== Seeds ==
1. Irina Khromacheva / Kamilla Rakhimova (final)
2. (Poland) Katarzyna Piter / (China) Tang Qianhui (semifinals)

== Draw ==
=== Key ===
- Q = Qualifier
- WC = Wild card
- LL = Lucky loser
- Alt = Alternate
- ITF = ITF entry
- PR = Protected ranking
- SR = Special ranking
- SE = Special exempt
- JE = Junior exempt
- JR = Junior Accelerator Programme entrant
- CO = College Accelerator Programme entrant
- NG = Next Gen Accelerator Program entrant
- w/o = Walkover
- r = Retired
- d = Defaulted

=== Draw ===
Quarterfinals
1	I Khromacheva; K Rakhimova	6	6
(Czech Republic) A Dețiuc; E Pridankina	0	4
(Australia) S Hunter (Brazil) L Pigossi	3	6	[10]
(Belgium) M Kempen (Romania) M Niculescu	6	3	[8]
(Colombia) E Arango (Hungary) P Udvardy	2	4
M Kozyreva; I Shymanovich	6	6
WC	(Czech Republic) N Bartůňková (Mexico) N Sousa Salazar	2	7	[6]
2	(Poland) K Piter (China) Q Tang	6	5	[10]

Semifinals
1	I Khromacheva; K Rakhimova	6	6
(Australia) S Hunter (Brazil) L Pigossi	2	3
M Kozyreva; I Shymanovich	6	6
2	(Poland) K Piter (China) Q Tang	3	3

Final
1	I Khromacheva; K Rakhimova	3	4
M Kozyreva; I Shymanovich	6	6
