= 2021 Abierto Zapopan =

- Date: 8–13 March
- Edition: 2nd
- Category: WTA 250
- Draw: 32S / 16D
- Prize money: $235,238
- Surface: Hard
- Location: Guadalajara, Mexico
- Venue: Panamerican Tennis Center

Champions

Singles
- (Spain) Sara Sorribes Tormo

Doubles
- (Australia) Ellen Perez / (Australia) Astra Sharma
- Abierto Zapopan

The 2021 Abierto Zapopan was a professional tennis tournament played on outdoor hardcourts. It was the 2nd edition of the tournament and part of the 2021 WTA Tour.

Originally scheduled for 16–21 March 2020 in Guadalajara, Mexico and was part of the 125K series during the 2020 tennis season, but was cancelled due to the COVID-19 pandemic due to local restrictions, and the suspension of play on the WTA tour.

It took place in Guadalajara, Mexico from 8 to 13 March 2021 and it was a part of the WTA 250 tournaments, offering a total of $235,238 in prize money.

== Champions ==
=== Singles ===
- (Spain) Sara Sorribes Tormo def. (Canada) Eugenie Bouchard 6–2, 7–5

=== Doubles ===
- (Australia) Ellen Perez / (Australia) Astra Sharma def. (United States) Desirae Krawczyk / (Mexico) Giuliana Olmos 6–4, 6–4.

== Point distribution and prize money ==
=== Point distribution ===
Event	W	F	SF	QF	Round of 16	Round of 32	Q	Q2	Q1
Singles	280	180	110	60	30	1	18	12	1
Doubles	280	180	110	60	1	—N/a	—N/a	—N/a	—N/a

=== Prize money ===
Event	W	F	SF	QF	Round of 16	Round of 32	Q2	Q1
Singles	$29,200	$16,398	$10,100	$5,800	$3,675	$2,675	$1,950	$1,270
Doubles*	$10,300	$6,000	$3,800	$2,300	$1,750	—N/a	—N/a	—N/a

_{*per team}

== Singles main-draw entrants ==
=== Seeds ===
Country	Player	Rank^{1}	Seed
ARG	Nadia Podoroska	45	1
CZE	Marie Bouzková	50	2
RUS	Anna Blinkova	69	3
ESP	Sara Sorribes Tormo	70	4
JPN	Nao Hibino	78	5
MNE	Danka Kovinić	84	6
CAN	Leylah Annie Fernandez	87	7
SLO	Kaja Juvan	91	8

- ^{1} Rankings are as of 1 March 2021

=== Other entrants ===
The following players received a wildcard into the singles main draw:

- (Canada) Eugenie Bouchard
- (United States) Katie Volynets
- (Mexico) Renata Zarazúa

The following players received entry using a protected ranking into the main draw:

- (Romania) Mihaela Buzărnescu
- (Slovakia) Anna Karolína Schmiedlová
- (United States) CoCo Vandeweghe

The following players qualified into the singles main draw:

- (Italy) Elisabetta Cocciaretto
- (United States) Lauren Davis
- (United States) Caroline Dolehide
- (Switzerland) Leonie Küng
- (Mexico) Giuliana Olmos
- (Australia) Astra Sharma

The following player received entry as a lucky loser:

- (United Kingdom) Harriet Dart

=== Withdrawals ===
Before the tournament

- (United States) Kristie Ahn → replaced by (Russia) Anna Kalinskaya
- (Australia) Daria Gavrilova → replaced by (Belgium) Greet Minnen
- (Switzerland) Viktorija Golubic → replaced by (United Kingdom) Harriet Dart
- (Ukraine) Kateryna Kozlova → replaced by (Germany) Anna-Lena Friedsam
- (Italy) Jasmine Paolini → replaced by (China) Wang Xiyu
- (United States) Sloane Stephens → replaced by (Poland) Katarzyna Kawa
- (Netherlands) Arantxa Rus → replaced by (Canada) Eugenie Bouchard

== Doubles entrants ==
=== Seeds ===
Country	Player	Country	Player	Rank^{1}	Seed
USA	Desirae Krawczyk	MEX	Giuliana Olmos	75	1
USA	Caroline Dolehide	USA	Vania King	128	2
AUS	Ellen Perez	AUS	Astra Sharma	165	3
ROU	Mihaela Buzărnescu	GER	Anna-Lena Friedsam	185	4

- ^{1} Rankings as of 1 March 2021.

=== Other entrants ===
The following pairs received wildcards into the doubles main draw:

- (Canada) Eugenie Bouchard / (United States) CoCo Vandeweghe
- (Canada) Leylah Annie Fernandez / (Mexico) Renata Zarazúa

The following pair received entry as alternates into the doubles main draw:

- (United States) Ingrid Neel / (Slovenia) Tamara Zidanšek

=== Withdrawals ===
Before the tournament

- (Netherlands) Arantxa Rus / (Slovenia) Tamara Zidanšek → (Spain) Aliona Bolsova / (Montenegro) Danka Kovinić

=== Retirements ===
- (Spain) Aliona Bolsova / (Montenegro) Danka Kovinić (lower back injury)
