= 2024 Guadalajara 125 Open =

- Date: 2–7 September
- Edition: 4th
- Category: WTA 125
- Draw: 32S / 8D
- Surface: Hard
- Location: Guadalajara, Mexico
- Venue: Panamerican Tennis Center

Champions

Singles
- Kamilla Rakhimova

Doubles
- (Poland) Katarzyna Piter / (Hungary) Fanny Stollár
- Abierto Zapopan

The 2024 Guadalajara 125 Open was a professional tennis tournament played on outdoor hardcourts. It was the 4th edition of the tournament and part of the 2024 WTA 125 tournaments (downgraded from WTA 250 status for the two previous editions). It took place in Guadalajara, Mexico from 2 to 7 September 2024.

== Champions ==
=== Singles ===
- Kamilla Rakhimova def. (Germany) Tatjana Maria, 6–3, 6–7^{(5–7)}, 6–3

=== Doubles ===
- (Poland) Katarzyna Piter / (Hungary) Fanny Stollár def. (Italy) Angelica Moratelli / (United States) Sabrina Santamaria, 6–4, 7–5

== Singles main draw entrants ==
=== Seeds ===
Country	Player	Rank¹	Seed
SVK	Anna Karolína Schmiedlová	87	1
ITA	Martina Trevisan	90	2
MEX	Renata Zarazúa	92	3
GER	Tatjana Maria	99	4
	Kamilla Rakhimova	104	5
USA	Emina Bektas	116	6
~~USA~~	~~Alycia Parks~~	~~117~~	~~7~~
ARG	Julia Riera	120	8
AUS	Maya Joint	135	9

¹ Rankings are as of 26 August 2024.

=== Other entrants ===
The following players received wildcards into the singles main draw:

- (Mexico) Julia García Ruiz
- (Mexico) Ana Karen Guadiana Campos
- (Croatia) Ana Konjuh
- (Greece) Dimitra Pavlou

The following players received entry from the qualifying draw:

- (Australia) Kimberly Birrell
- (United Kingdom) Samantha Murray Sharan
- (Ukraine) Valeriya Strakhova
- (United States) Sachia Vickery

=== Withdrawals ===
- (United States) Alycia Parks → replaced by (Serbia) Aleksandra Krunić

== Doubles main draw entrants ==
=== Seeds ===
Country	Player	Country	Player	Rank^{1}	Seed
ITA	Angelica Moratelli	USA	Sabrina Santamaria	165	1
POL	Katarzyna Piter	HUN	Fanny Stollár	182	2

¹ Rankings are as of 26 August 2024.

=== Other entrants ===
The following pair received a wildcard into the doubles main draw:

- (Mexico) Ana Karen Guadiana Campos / (Mexico) María Fernanda Navarro Oliva

The following pair received entry as alternates:

- (Australia) Kimberly Birrell / (Philippines) Alex Eala

=== Withdrawals ===
- (Australia) Olivia Gadecki / (Argentina) Julia Riera → replaced by (Australia) Kimberly Birrell / (Philippines) Alex Eala
