= 2024 Guadalajara 125 Open – Singles =

Singles
- 2024 Guadalajara 125 Open

Final
- Champion: Kamilla Rakhimova
- Runner-up: (Germany) Tatjana Maria
- Score: 6–3, 6–7^{(5–7)}, 6–3

Details
- Draw: 32
- Seeds: 8

Events
Singles	Doubles
← 2022 ·	Abierto Zapopan	· 2025 →

Kamilla Rakhimova won the singles title at the 2024 Guadalajara 125 Open, defeating Tatjana Maria in the final, 6–3, 6–7^{(5–7)}, 6–3.

Sloane Stephens was the reigning champion from 2022, when the event was last held, but did not participate this year.

== Seeds ==
1. (Slovakia) Anna Karolína Schmiedlová (semifinals)
2. (Italy) Martina Trevisan (quarterfinals, retired)
3. (Mexico) Renata Zarazúa (first round)
4. (Germany) Tatjana Maria (final)
5. Kamilla Rakhimova (champion)
6. (United States) Emina Bektas (quarterfinals)
7. (United States) Alycia Parks (withdrew)
8. (Argentina) Julia Riera (first round)
9. (Australia) Maya Joint (first round)

== Draw ==
=== Key ===
- Q = Qualifier
- WC = Wild card
- LL = Lucky loser
- Alt = Alternate
- SE = Special exempt
- PR = Protected ranking
- ITF = ITF entry
- JE = Junior exempt
- w/o = Walkover
- r = Retired
- d = Defaulted
- SR = Special ranking

=== Finals ===
Semifinals
1	(Slovakia) Anna Karolína Schmiedlová	0	2
4	(Germany) Tatjana Maria	6	6
(Colombia) Emiliana Arango	4	2
5	Kamilla Rakhimova	6	6

Final
4	(Germany) Tatjana Maria	3	7^{7}	3
5	Kamilla Rakhimova	6	6^{5}	6

=== Top half ===
First round
1	(Slovakia) AK Schmiedlová	4	6	6
WC	(Mexico) J García Ruiz	6	2	0
Q	(Australia) K Birrell	6	7
WC	(Croatia) A Konjuh	2	5
WC	(Greece) D Pavlou	6	6
Q	(Ukraine) V Strakhova	1	2
(United States) UM Arconada	7^{10}	6^{6}	1
6	(United States) E Bektas	6^{8}	7^{8}	6
4	(Germany) T Maria	7^{9}	6
(United States) K Day	6^{7}	4
(United States) V Hu	6	6^{2}	4
(Philippines) A Eala	3	7^{7}	6
(Italy) L Stefanini	6	6
Q	(United States) S Vickery	1	1
(Australia) O Gadecki	6	6
8	(Argentina) J Riera	4	2

Second round
1	(Slovakia) AK Schmiedlová	6	6
Q	(Australia) K Birrell	2	3
WC	(Greece) D Pavlou	1	1
6	(United States) E Bektas	6	6
4	(Germany) T Maria	7	6
(Philippines) A Eala	5	2
(Italy) L Stefanini	1	6	4
(Australia) O Gadecki	6	4	6

Quarterfinals
1	(Slovakia) AK Schmiedlová	6	6
6	(United States) E Bektas	3	2
4	(Germany) T Maria	7	6
(Australia) O Gadecki	5	0

Semifinals
1	(Slovakia) AK Schmiedlová	0	2
4	(Germany) T Maria	6	6

=== Bottom half ===
First round
9	(Australia) M Joint	4	3
(United States) E Mandlik	6	6
WC	(Mexico) AK Guadiana Campos	0	1
(Colombia) E Arango	6	6
(Mexico) AS Sánchez	3	3
(Australia) A Sharma	6	6
(Canada) R Marino	6	6
3	(Mexico) R Zarazúa	4	2
5	K Rakhimova	6	6
Q	(United Kingdom) S Murray Sharan	3	0
(Hong Kong) E Chong	3	2
(Australia) T Preston	6	6
(Serbia) A Krunić	6	7^{7}
(Canada) M Stakusic	0	6^{5}
V Savinykh	6	4	2
2	(Italy) M Trevisan	3	6	6

Second round
(United States) E Mandlik	4	6	2
(Colombia) E Arango	6	3	6
(Australia) A Sharma	3	6^{9}
(Canada) R Marino	6	7^{11}
5	K Rakhimova	6	6
(Australia) T Preston	1	2
(Serbia) A Krunić	3	3
2	(Italy) M Trevisan	6	6

Quarterfinals
(Colombia) E Arango	6	5	7
(Canada) R Marino	3	7	5
5	K Rakhimova	6	3
2	(Italy) M Trevisan	1	1^{r}

Semifinals
(Colombia) E Arango	4	2
5	K Rakhimova	6	6

== Qualifying ==
=== Seeds ===
1. (United States) Sachia Vickery (qualified)
2. (Australia) Kimberly Birrell (qualified)
3. (Ukraine) Valeriya Strakhova (qualified)
4. (Serbia) Aleksandra Krunić (moved to main draw)

=== Qualifiers ===
1. (United States) Sachia Vickery
2. (Australia) Kimberly Birrell
3. (Ukraine) Valeriya Strakhova
4. (United Kingdom) Samantha Murray Sharan

=== Qualifying draw ===
==== First qualifier ====
Qualifying competition
1	(United States) Sachia Vickery	6	4
	(Hungary) Fanny Stollár	4	0^{r}

==== Second qualifier ====
Qualifying competition
2	(Australia) Kimberly Birrell	6	6
WC	(Mexico) María Fernanda Navarro Oliva	2	1

==== Third qualifier ====
Qualifying competition
3	(Ukraine) Valeriya Strakhova	6	6
WC	(Spain) Sandra Alonso Abril	1	0

==== Fourth qualifier ====
Qualifying competition
Alt	(United Kingdom) Samantha Murray Sharan	3
	(Ukraine) Kateryna Volodko	3^{r}
