= 2025 Guadalajara 125 Open – Singles =

Singles
- 2025 Guadalajara 125 Open

Final
- Champion: (Philippines) Alexandra Eala
- Runner-up: (Hungary) Panna Udvardy
- Score: 1–6, 7–5, 6–3

Details
- Draw: 32
- Seeds: 8

Events
Singles	Doubles
← 2024 ·	Abierto Zapopan	· 2026 →

Alexandra Eala won the singles title at the 2025 Guadalajara 125 Open, defeating Panna Udvardy in the final, 1–6, 7–5, 6–3, becoming the first Filipina ever to win a Challenger-level WTA title.

Kamilla Rakhimova was the defending champion, but lost in the first round to Victoria Jiménez Kasintseva.

== Seeds ==
1. Kamilla Rakhimova (first round)
2. (Philippines) Alexandra Eala (champion)
3. (Colombia) Emiliana Arango (quarterfinals)
4. (United Kingdom) Francesca Jones (quarterfinals)
5. (France) Elsa Jacquemot (withdrew)
6. (Canada) Rebecca Marino (first round)
7. (Poland) Katarzyna Kawa (second round)
8. (Australia) Olivia Gadecki (first round)

== Draw ==
=== Key ===
- Q = Qualifier
- WC = Wild card
- LL = Lucky loser
- Alt = Alternate
- ITF = ITF entry
- PR = Protected ranking
- SR = Special ranking
- SE = Special exempt
- JE = Junior exempt
- JR = Junior Accelerator Programme entrant
- CO = College Accelerator Programme entrant
- NG = Next Gen Accelerator Program entrant
- w/o = Walkover
- r = Retired
- d = Defaulted

=== Finals ===
Semifinals
Q	Maria Kozyreva	3	4
(Hungary) Panna Udvardy	6	6
PR	(United States) Kayla Day	2	3
2/WC	(Philippines) Alexandra Eala	6	6

Final
(Hungary) Panna Udvardy	6	5	3
2/WC	(Philippines) Alexandra Eala	1	7	6

=== Top half ===
First round
1	K Rakhimova	1	6^{2}
(Andorra) V Jiménez Kasintseva	6	7^{7}
(United States) A Rogers	5	5
WC	(United States) A Smith	7	7
Q	M Kozyreva	7^{7}	6
Q	(Finland) A Kulikova	6^{0}	1
(Italy) M Trevisan	6	6
8	(Australia) O Gadecki	3	2
4	(United Kingdom) F Jones	7^{7}	6
Q	(Mexico) V Rodríguez	6^{1}	0
I Shymanovich	0	6	4
(Brazil) L Pigossi	6	4	6
WC	A Oktiabreva	0	6	1
WC	(Czech Republic) N Bartůňková	6	4	6
(Hungary) P Udvardy	6	6
LL	(Mexico) J Hinojosa Gómez	3	2

Second round
(Andorra) V Jiménez Kasintseva	6	4	5
WC	(United States) A Smith	2	6	7
Q	M Kozyreva	6	6
(Italy) M Trevisan	3	3
4	(United Kingdom) F Jones	6	6
(Brazil) L Pigossi	4	4
WC	(Czech Republic) N Bartůňková	6^{7}	2
(Hungary) P Udvardy	7^{9}	6

Quarterfinals
WC	(United States) A Smith	6^{10}	4
Q	M Kozyreva	7^{12}	6
4	(United Kingdom) F Jones	4	6	3
(Hungary) P Udvardy	6	4	6

Semifinals
Q	M Kozyreva	3	4
(Hungary) P Udvardy	6	6

=== Bottom half ===
First round
6	(Canada) R Marino	6	2	4
(Mexico) AS Sánchez	4	6	6
PR	(United States) K Day	6	3	6
(United States) E Bektas	4	6	4
E Pridankina	3	6	6
(Canada) M Stakusic	6	0	1
(Italy) L Stefanini	6^{3}	0
3	(Colombia) E Arango	7^{7}	6
7	(Poland) K Kawa	6	6
(France) A Hesse	4	3
(Italy) N Fossa Huergo	6	6
LL	(Mexico) N Sousa Salazar	2	3
(Australia) M Inglis	4	1
Q	(United States) V Lepchenko	6	6
(Netherlands) A Hartono	2	2
2/WC	(Philippines) A Eala	6	6

Second round
(Mexico) AS Sánchez	1	4
PR	(United States) K Day	6	6
E Pridankina	6^{6}	1
3	(Colombia) E Arango	7^{8}	6
7	(Poland) K Kawa	7^{7}	0	1
(Italy) N Fossa Huergo	6^{2}	6	6
Q	(United States) V Lepchenko	7^{7}	6^{3}	3
2/WC	(Philippines) A Eala	6^{3}	7^{7}	6

Quarterfinals
PR	(United States) K Day	7	6
3	(Colombia) E Arango	5	2
(Italy) N Fossa Huergo	6^{2}	2
2/WC	(Philippines) A Eala	7^{7}	6

Semifinals
PR	(United States) K Day	2	3
2/WC	(Philippines) A Eala	6	6

== Qualifying ==
=== Seeds ===
1. (United States) Varvara Lepchenko (qualified)
2. (Finland) Anastasia Kulikova (qualified)
3. (Mexico) Victoria Rodríguez (qualified)
4. Maria Kozyreva (qualified)

=== Qualifiers ===
1. (United States) Varvara Lepchenko
2. (Finland) Anastasia Kulikova
3. (Mexico) Victoria Rodríguez
4. Maria Kozyreva

=== Lucky losers ===
1. (Mexico) Jéssica Hinojosa Gómez
2. (Mexico) Natalia Sousa Salazar

=== Qualifying draw ===
==== First qualifier ====
Qualifying competition
1	(United States) Varvara Lepchenko	6	7^{7}
	(Mexico) Jéssica Hinojosa Gómez	0	6^{1}

==== Second qualifier ====
Qualifying competition
2	(Finland) Anastasia Kulikova	6	7
	(China) Tang Qianhui	2	5

==== Third qualifier ====
Qualifying competition
3	(Mexico) Victoria Rodríguez	6	6
WC	(Mexico) Lya Isabel Fernández Olivares	0	0

==== Fourth qualifier ====
Qualifying competition
4	Maria Kozyreva	6	6
WC	(Mexico) Natalia Sousa Salazar	0	0
