= 2024 Guadalajara 125 Open – Doubles =

Doubles
- 2024 Guadalajara 125 Open

Final
- Champions: (Poland) Katarzyna Piter (Hungary) Fanny Stollár
- Runners-up: (Italy) Angelica Moratelli (United States) Sabrina Santamaria
- Score: 6–4, 7–5

Events
Singles	Doubles
← 2022 ·	Abierto Zapopan	· 2025 →

Katarzyna Piter and Fanny Stollár won the doubles title at the 2024 Guadalajara 125 Open, defeating Angelica Moratelli and Sabrina Santamaria in the final, 6–4, 7–5.

Kaitlyn Christian and Lidziya Marozava were the reigning champions from 2022, when the event was last held, but did not participate this year.

== Seeds ==
1. (Italy) Angelica Moratelli / (United States) Sabrina Santamaria (final)
2. (Poland) Katarzyna Piter / (Hungary) Fanny Stollár (champions)

== Draw ==
=== Key ===
- Q = Qualifier
- WC = Wild card
- LL = Lucky loser
- Alt = Alternate
- SE = Special exempt
- PR = Protected ranking
- ITF = ITF entry
- JE = Junior exempt
- w/o = Walkover
- r = Retired
- d = Defaulted
- SR = Special ranking

=== Draw ===
Quarterfinals
1	(Italy) A Moratelli (United States) S Santamaria	6	6^{6}	[11]
(Ukraine) V Strakhova (Mexico) R Zarazúa	3	7^{8}	[9]
(Australia) M Joint (Australia) T Preston	7	6
(United Kingdom) S Murray Sharan (United Kingdom) E Silva	5	3
WC	(Mexico) AK Guadiana Campos (Mexico) MF Navarro Oliva	4	1
(United States) E Bektas (Serbia) A Krunić	6	6
Alt	(Australia) K Birrell (Philippines) A Eala	4	4
2	(Poland) K Piter (Hungary) F Stollár	6	6

Semifinals
1	(Italy) A Moratelli (United States) S Santamaria	4	6	[10]
(Australia) M Joint (Australia) T Preston	6	4	[4]
(United States) E Bektas (Serbia) A Krunić
2	(Poland) K Piter (Hungary) F Stollár	w/o

Final
1	(Italy) A Moratelli (United States) S Santamaria	4	5
2	(Poland) K Piter (Hungary) F Stollár	6	7
