= 2021 Abierto Zapopan – Doubles =

Doubles
- 2021 Abierto Zapopan

Final
- Champions: (Australia) Ellen Perez (Australia) Astra Sharma
- Runners-up: (United States) Desirae Krawczyk (Mexico) Giuliana Olmos
- Score: 6–4, 6–4

Events
Singles	Doubles
← 2019 ·	Abierto Zapopan	· 2022 →

Maria Sanchez and Fanny Stollár were the defending champions from when the tournament was last held in 2019, but they lost in the semifinals to Ellen Perez and Astra Sharma.

Perez and Sharma went on to win the title, defeating Desirae Krawczyk and Giuliana Olmos in the final, 6–4, 6–4.

== Seeds ==
1. (United States) Desirae Krawczyk / (Mexico) Giuliana Olmos (final)
2. (United States) Caroline Dolehide / (United States) Vania King (quarterfinals)
3. (Australia) Ellen Perez / (Australia) Astra Sharma (champions)
4. (Romania) Mihaela Buzărnescu / (Germany) Anna-Lena Friedsam (quarterfinals)

== Draw ==
Key

- Q = Qualifier
- WC = Wild card
- LL = Lucky loser
- Alt = Alternate
- ITF = ITF entry
- PR = Protected ranking
- SR = Special ranking
- SE = Special exempt
- JE = Junior exempt
- JR = Junior Accelerator Programme entrant
- CO = College Accelerator Programme entrant
- NG = Next Gen Accelerator Program entrant
- w/o = Walkover
- r = Retired
- d = Defaulted

First round
1	(United States) D Krawczyk (Mexico) G Olmos	7	6
(Romania) I Bara (Slovenia) D Jakupović	5	1
(Spain) L Arruabarrena (Poland) K Piter	7	4	[8]
(Argentina) N Podoroska (Spain) S Sorribes Tormo	5	6	[10]
4	(Romania) M Buzărnescu (Germany) A-L Friedsam	6	6
(Russia) A Blinkova (Slovakia) K Kučová	4	2
(Spain) A Bolsova (Montenegro) D Kovinić	6	6^{5}	[10]
(Japan) E Hozumi (Japan) M Kato	2	7^{7}	[3]
WC	(Canada) E Bouchard (United States) C Vandeweghe	7^{9}	6
(Poland) P Kania-Choduń (India) A Raina	6^{7}	2
WC	(Canada) LA Fernandez (Mexico) R Zarazúa	6	1	[7]
3	(Australia) E Perez (Australia) A Sharma	4	6	[10]
(United States) M Sanchez (Hungary) F Stollár	7^{7}	5	[10]
Alt	(United States) I Neel (Slovenia) T Zidanšek	6^{1}	7	[4]
(Slovenia) K Juvan (Russia) A Kalinskaya	4	4
2	(United States) C Dolehide (United States) V King	6	6

Quarterfinals
1	(United States) D Krawczyk (Mexico) G Olmos	6	4	[10]
(Argentina) N Podoroska (Spain) S Sorribes Tormo	4	6	[7]
4	(Romania) M Buzărnescu (Germany) A-L Friedsam	3	3
(Spain) A Bolsova (Montenegro) D Kovinić	6	6
WC	(Canada) E Bouchard (United States) C Vandeweghe	4	4
3	(Australia) E Perez (Australia) A Sharma	6	6
(United States) M Sanchez (Hungary) F Stollár	6	3	[10]
2	(United States) C Dolehide (United States) V King	1	6	[7]

Semifinals
1	(United States) D Krawczyk (Mexico) G Olmos	6	2
(Spain) A Bolsova (Montenegro) D Kovinić	2	0^{r}
3	(Australia) E Perez (Australia) A Sharma	4	7	[10]
(United States) M Sanchez (Hungary) F Stollár	6	5	[7]

Final
1	(United States) D Krawczyk (Mexico) G Olmos	4	4
3	(Australia) E Perez (Australia) A Sharma	6	6
