= 2021 Tenerife Ladies Open – Doubles =

Tennis competition

Doubles
- 2021 Tenerife Ladies Open

Final
- Champions: (Norway) Ulrikke Eikeri (Australia) Ellen Perez
- Runners-up: (Ukraine) Lyudmyla Kichenok (Ukraine) Marta Kostyuk
- Score: 6–3, 6–3

Events
Singles	Doubles
Tenerife Ladies Open

This was the first edition of the women's event.

Ulrikke Eikeri and Ellen Perez won the title, defeating Lyudmyla Kichenok and Marta Kostyuk in the final, 6–3, 6–3.

== Seeds ==
1. (Croatia) Darija Jurak / (Slovenia) Andreja Klepač (quarterfinals)
2. (Japan) Eri Hozumi / (China) Zhang Shuai (semifinals)
3. (Ukraine) Lyudmyla Kichenok / (Ukraine) Marta Kostyuk (final)
4. (Norway) Ulrikke Eikeri / (Australia) Ellen Perez (champions)

== Draw ==
=== Key ===
- Q = Qualifier
- WC = Wild card
- LL = Lucky loser
- Alt = Alternate
- SE = Special exempt
- PR = Protected ranking
- ITF = ITF entry
- JE = Junior exempt
- w/o = Walkover
- r = Retired
- d = Defaulted
- SR = Special ranking

=== Draw ===
First round
1	(Croatia) D Jurak (Slovenia) A Klepač	6	6
(United States) E Bektas (United Kingdom) T Moore	0	2
(Germany) M Barthel (Germany) J Lohoff	5	4
(Russia) I Khromacheva (Montenegro) D Kovinić	7	6
3	(Ukraine) L Kichenok (Ukraine) M Kostyuk	6	6
WC	(Spain) P Arias Manjón (Spain) S Sorribes Tormo	0	3
(Netherlands) A Rus (United Kingdom) H Watson	6^{2}	4
(Hungary) A Bondár (Hungary) D Gálfi	7^{7}	6
(United States) I Neel (Poland) A Rosolska	1	3
(Germany) V Heisen (Romania) A Mitu	6	6
(Poland) K Piter (Czech Republic) R Voráčová	7	3	[3]
4	(Norway) U Eikeri (Australia) E Perez	5	6	[10]
PR	(Indonesia) B Gumulya (Thailand) P Plipuech	6	2	[10]
WC	(Italy) C Ferrando (Italy) L Stefanini	3	6	[5]
(India) A Raina (Netherlands) R van der Hoek	4	3
2	(Japan) E Hozumi (China) S Zhang	6	6

Quarterfinals
1	(Croatia) D Jurak (Slovenia) A Klepač	6^{3}	6	[6]
(Russia) I Khromacheva (Montenegro) D Kovinić	7^{7}	4	[10]
3	(Ukraine) L Kichenok (Ukraine) M Kostyuk	6	3	[10]
(Hungary) A Bondár (Hungary) D Gálfi	1	6	[7]
(Germany) V Heisen (Romania) A Mitu	1	7	[6]
4	(Norway) U Eikeri (Australia) E Perez	6	5	[10]
PR	(Indonesia) B Gumulya (Thailand) P Plipuech	1	2
2	(Japan) E Hozumi (China) S Zhang	6	6

Semifinals
(Russia) I Khromacheva (Montenegro) D Kovinić	3	3
3	(Ukraine) L Kichenok (Ukraine) M Kostyuk	6	6
4	(Norway) U Eikeri (Australia) E Perez	6	4	[10]
2	(Japan) E Hozumi (China) S Zhang	3	6	[6]

Final
3	(Ukraine) L Kichenok (Ukraine) M Kostyuk	3	3
4	(Norway) U Eikeri (Australia) E Perez	6	6
