= Tenerife Ladies Open (tennis) =

Women's tennis tournament

- 2021 Tenerife Ladies Open

Defunct tennis tournament
- Founded: 2021
- Abolished: 2021
- Location: Guía de Isora, Tenerife; Spain
- Venue: Abama Tennis Academy
- Category: WTA 250
- Surface: Hard
- Draw: 32S / 16Q / 16D
- Prize money: $235,238
- Website: WTA Website

Current champions
- Women's singles: (United States) Ann Li
- Women's doubles: (Norway) Ulrikke Eikeri / (Australia) Ellen Perez

The Tenerife Ladies Open was a tennis tournament held in Guía de Isora, Tenerife, Spain for female professional tennis players, whose first edition was part of the 2021 WTA Tour. It took place on outdoor hard courts, on Flexi-Pave surface, and during mid-October.

== Results ==
=== Singles ===
Year	Champion	Runner-up	Score
2021	(United States) Ann Li	(Colombia) Camila Osorio	6–1, 6–4

=== Doubles ===
Year	Champions	Runners-up	Score
2021	(Norway) Ulrikke Eikeri (Australia) Ellen Perez	(Ukraine) Lyudmyla Kichenok (Ukraine) Marta Kostyuk	6–3, 6–3
