= 2021 Tenerife Ladies Open – Singles =

Singles
- 2021 Tenerife Ladies Open

Final
- Champion: (United States) Ann Li
- Runner-up: (Colombia) Camila Osorio
- Score: 6–1, 6–4

Details
- Draw: 32 (6Q / 3WC)
- Seeds: 8

Events
Singles	Doubles
Tenerife Ladies Open

This was the first edition of the tournament.

Ann Li won her maiden WTA title, defeating Camila Osorio in the final, 6–1, 6–4. This was Li's second final of the year, but the first in which she was able to compete; the Grampians Trophy final in February was cancelled due to scheduling difficulties.

== Seeds ==
1. (Ukraine) Elina Svitolina (first round)
2. (Slovenia) Tamara Zidanšek (first round)
3. (Spain) Sara Sorribes Tormo (first round)
4. (Italy) Camila Giorgi (semifinals)
5. (Switzerland) Viktorija Golubic (first round)
6. (China) Zhang Shuai (first round)
7. (Denmark) Clara Tauson (second round)
8. (United States) Alison Riske (first round)

== Draw ==
=== Key ===
- Q = Qualifier
- WC = Wild card
- LL = Lucky loser
- Alt = Alternate
- SE = Special exempt
- PR = Protected ranking
- ITF = ITF entry
- JE = Junior exempt
- w/o = Walkover
- r = Retired
- d = Defaulted
- SR = Special ranking

=== Finals ===
Semifinals
(Colombia) Camila Osorio	6	7
4	(Italy) Camila Giorgi	4	5
(United States) Ann Li	6	6
(France) Alizé Cornet	2	1

Final
(Colombia) Camila Osorio	1	4
(United States) Ann Li	6	6

=== Top half ===
First round
1	(Ukraine) E Svitolina	7	3	2
(Colombia) C Osorio	5	6	6
WC	(Italy) L Stefanini	2	0
(Egypt) M Sherif	6	6
PR	(China) S Zheng	6	6
WC	(Spain) R Masarova	4	2
(United Kingdom) H Watson	4	6	6^{6}
7	(Denmark) C Tauson	6	2	7^{8}
4	(Italy) C Giorgi	7^{7}	3	6
Q	(Spain) A Bolsova	6^{4}	6	4
(Belgium) A Van Uytvanck	3	3
(Montenegro) D Kovinić	6	6
Q	(Luxembourg) M Minella	5	6^{2}
(Belgium) G Minnen	7	7^{7}
(Netherlands) A Rus	6	6
5	(Switzerland) V Golubic	3	4

Second round
(Colombia) C Osorio	6	6
(Egypt) M Sherif	4	2
PR	(China) S Zheng	7^{7}	2	6
7	(Denmark) C Tauson	6^{4}	6	4
4	(Italy) C Giorgi	6	6
(Montenegro) D Kovinić	1	2
(Belgium) G Minnen	1	2
(Netherlands) A Rus	6	6

Quarterfinals
(Colombia) C Osorio	7	6
PR	(China) S Zheng	5	1
4	(Italy) C Giorgi	6	6
(Netherlands) A Rus	1	1

Semifinals
(Colombia) C Osorio	6	7
4	(Italy) C Giorgi	4	5

=== Bottom half ===
First round
8	(United States) A Riske	1	4
Q	(Croatia) D Vekić	6	6
(Ukraine) M Kostyuk	4	4
(Romania) I-C Begu	6	6
WC	(Spain) N Párrizas Díaz	6	4	1
(United States) A Li	2	6	6
(Russia) V Gracheva	6	5	7^{7}
3	(Spain) S Sorribes Tormo	4	7	6^{4}
6	(China) S Zhang	2	1
Q	(China) Xin Wang	6	6
(France) A Cornet	6	6
Q	(Switzerland) S Vögele	1	2
LL	(Slovenia) K Juvan	6	1	4
(Slovakia) AK Schmiedlová	4	6	6
Q	(Romania) J Cristian	7	4	6
2	(Slovenia) T Zidanšek	5	6	1

Second round
Q	(Croatia) D Vekić	6	2	6^{4}
(Romania) I-C Begu	4	6	7^{7}
(United States) A Li	6	6
(Russia) V Gracheva	4	2
Q	(China) Xin Wang	1	7^{7}	1^{r}
(France) A Cornet	6	6^{5}	4
(Slovakia) AK Schmiedlová	6	7
Q	(Romania) J Cristian	2	5

Quarterfinals
(Romania) I-C Begu	5	5
(United States) A Li	7	7
(France) A Cornet	6	6
(Slovakia) AK Schmiedlová	3	3

Semifinals
(United States) A Li	6	6
(France) A Cornet	2	1

== Qualifying ==
=== Seeds ===
1. (Slovenia) Kaja Juvan (qualifying competition, lucky loser)
2. (Croatia) Donna Vekić (qualified)
3. (Romania) Jaqueline Cristian (qualified)
4. (China) Wang Xinyu (qualified)
5. (Switzerland) Stefanie Vögele (qualified)
6. (Hungary) Dalma Gálfi (qualifying competition)
7. (Belgium) Kirsten Flipkens (qualifying competition)
8. (Hungary) Anna Bondár (qualifying competition)
9. (Belgium) Ysaline Bonaventure (qualifying competition)
10. (Netherlands) Lesley Pattinama Kerkhove (qualifying competition)
11. (Spain) Aliona Bolsova (qualified)
12. (India) Ankita Raina (first round)

=== Qualifiers ===
1. (Spain) Aliona Bolsova
2. (Croatia) Donna Vekić
3. (Romania) Jaqueline Cristian
4. (China) Wang Xinyu
5. (Switzerland) Stefanie Vögele
6. (Luxembourg) Mandy Minella

=== Lucky loser ===
1. (Slovenia) Kaja Juvan

=== Qualifying draw ===
==== First qualifier ====
First round
1	(Slovenia) Kaja Juvan	6	6
WC	(Spain) Elena Lobo Corral	0	1
PR	(Russia) Irina Khromacheva	3	2
11	(Spain) Aliona Bolsova	6	6

Qualifying competition
1	(Slovenia) Kaja Juvan	6	6^{6}	6^{5}
11	(Spain) Aliona Bolsova	4	7^{8}	7^{7}

==== Second qualifier ====
First round
2	(Croatia) Donna Vekić	6	6
WC	(Spain) Jéssica Bouzas Maneiro	0	2
WC	(Spain) Marina Bassols Ribera	3	6	4
9	(Belgium) Ysaline Bonaventure	6	1	6

Qualifying competition
2	(Croatia) Donna Vekić	6	4	6
9	(Belgium) Ysaline Bonaventure	2	6	1

==== Third qualifier ====
First round
3	(Romania) Jaqueline Cristian	6	6
PR	(Germany) Mona Barthel	1	1
(Poland) Urszula Radwańska	4	4
10	(Netherlands) Lesley Pattinama Kerkhove	6	6

Qualifying competition
3	(Romania) Jaqueline Cristian	6	6
10	(Netherlands) Lesley Pattinama Kerkhove	3	2

==== Fourth qualifier ====
First round
4	(China) Wang Xinyu	6	6
PR	(Serbia) Ivana Jorović	0	1
(Croatia) Jana Fett	2	3
8	(Hungary) Anna Bondár	6	6

Qualifying competition
4	(China) Wang Xinyu	6	6
8	(Hungary) Anna Bondár	1	3

==== Fifth qualifier ====
First round
5	(Switzerland) Stefanie Vögele	7^{7}	6
(Croatia) Tereza Mrdeža	6^{3}	1
WC	(Italy) Cristiana Ferrando	6	5	3
7	(Belgium) Kirsten Flipkens	4	7	6

Qualifying competition
5	(Switzerland) Stefanie Vögele	6	7^{8}
7	(Belgium) Kirsten Flipkens	3	6^{6}

==== Sixth qualifier ====
First round
6	(Hungary) Dalma Gálfi	6^{5}	7^{10}	6
(Hungary) Réka Luca Jani	7^{7}	6^{8}	3
PR	(Luxembourg) Mandy Minella	6	6
12	(India) Ankita Raina	3	2

Qualifying competition
6	(Hungary) Dalma Gálfi	6^{6}	7	3
PR	(Luxembourg) Mandy Minella	7^{8}	5	6
