= Ann Li (tennis) =

American tennis player (born 2000)

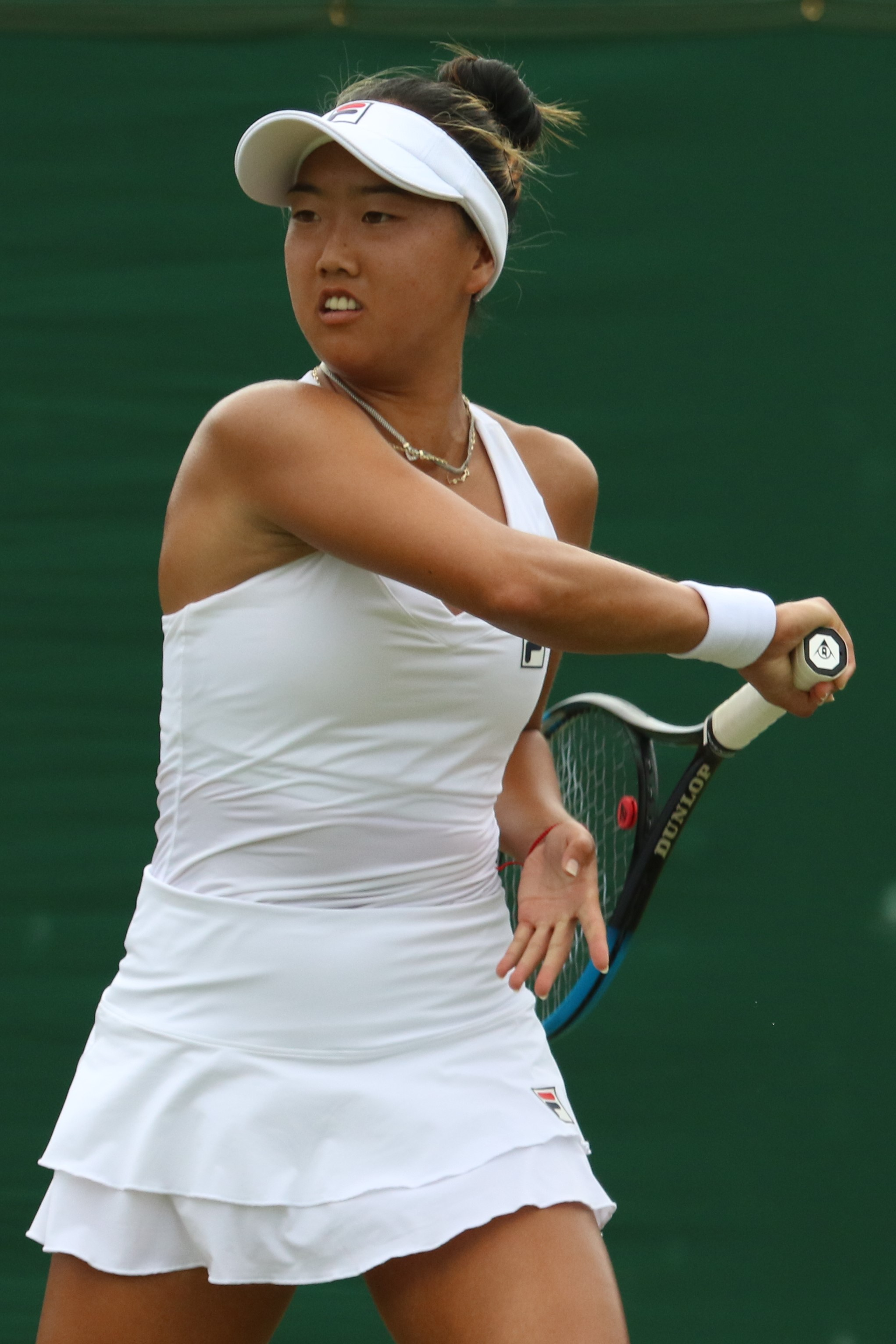
- Li at the 2023 Wimbledon Championships
- Country (sports): United States
- Born: June 26, 2000 (age 26) King of Prussia, Pennsylvania, US
- Height: 5 ft 7 in (170 cm)
- Turned pro: 2017
- Plays: Right (two-handed backhand)
- Coach: Henner Nehles (2020-current)
- Prize money: $4,597,553

Singles
- Career record: 292–204
- Career titles: 2
- Highest ranking: No. 25 (19 October 2026)
- Current ranking: No. 25 (19 October 2026)

Grand Slam singles results
- Australian Open: 3R (2021)
- French Open: 2R (2021, 2025, 2026)
- Wimbledon: 2R (2022, 2025)
- US Open: 4R (2025)

Doubles
- Career record: 25–40
- Career titles: 0
- Highest ranking: No. 134 (30 March 2026)
- Current ranking: No. 203 (19 October 2026)

Grand Slam doubles results
- Australian Open: 1R (2022, 2026)
- French Open: 3R (2025)
- Wimbledon: 1R (2021, 2022, 2025, 2026)
- US Open: 2R (2025)
- Last updated on: 19 October 2026.

- Chinese: 李吉妮
Transcriptions
Standard Mandarin
- Hanyu Pinyin: Lǐ Jínī

Ann Li (Note: Chinese: 李吉妮; pinyin: Lǐ Jínī) (born June 26, 2000) is an American professional tennis player. She has a career-high singles ranking by the WTA of world No. 25, achieved on 19 October 2026, and a best doubles ranking of No. 134, achieved on 30 March 2026. She has won two singles titles on the WTA Tour, one singles title on the WTA Challenger Tour, and three titles on the ITF Women's Circuit. Li was a finalist at the junior competition of the 2017 Wimbledon Championships.

== Personal background ==
Li was born into a sports family. Her father, who played soccer in college, is from Changchun, while her mother, who ran track in college, is from Suzhou. Her aunt was a professional speed skater in China.

== Career ==
=== 2017–2018: Juniors, professional debut ===
Li reached her first Junior Grand Slam singles final in 2017 at Wimbledon. In the first all-American girls' final since 1979, the unseeded Li lost to third seed Claire Liu, in three sets. Two weeks later, Li won her first professional title on the ITF Circuit, a $15k tournament in Evansville, Indiana.

Li entered the Lexington Open where she defeated Renata Zarazúa, Julia Glushko, Anastasia Nefedova, Jessica Pegula, before losing to Asia Muhammad, in straight sets. She participated at the Landisville Challenge where she defeated former British No. 1, Heather Watson, and Wimbledon finalist, Sabine Lisicki, but lost to Madison Brengle in the quarterfinals. In the ITF Templeton Pro, she eliminated fellow wildcard Sophia Whittle but lost to Sofya Zhuk. She tried to qualify for the 2018 US Open but lost to Marie Bouzková. She then entered an ITF event in Texas where she lost to Naomi Broady. Her best result after the US Open was at Stockton where she beat Jovana Jakšić and Lauren Davis, before yet again falling to Madison Brengle. In Templeton, she won against Nicole Gibbs before losing to Hailey Baptiste.

=== 2020: Major debut and third round, top 100 ===
At the Australian Open, Li played made her Grand Slam tournament debut, after qualifying for the main draw. She advanced to the second round, where she lost to the eventual champion, Sofia Kenin.

Li reached the third round of a major for the first time in her career at the US Open defeating 13th seed Alison Riske en route, before her run was ended by 17th seed Angelique Kerber. She reached the top 100 at world No. 97, on 9 November 2020.

=== 2021: First WTA Tour title, major third round, top 50 ===
Li reached a third round of a Grand Slam championship for the second time at the Australian Open, losing to seventh seed Aryna Sabalenka. She also reached the second round at the French Open on her debut at this major, at which point she lost to fifth seed Elina Svitolina.

Li won her maiden WTA Tour title at the Tenerife Ladies Open, defeating Camila Osorio in the final, in straight sets. With this title, her ranking rose into the top 50 for the first time, reaching a new career-high of No. 48 on 25 October 2021. In November, she was nominated on the list for the "2021 WTA Newcomer of the Year".

=== 2022–2023: WTA 1000 third round ===
At the 2022 Miami Open, Li reached the third round of a WTA 1000 for the first time defeating third seed Anett Kontaveit, before losing to Alison Riske.

In June, Li made the second round at Wimbledon, overcoming Lucia Bronzetti for her first win at this major. Li lost to Marie Bouzková.

Li qualified for the 2023 Cincinnati Open where she defeated Magda Linette in the first round, before losing to second seed Aryna Sabalenka. She also made it through qualifying at the Guadalajara Open, but lost in the first round of the main draw to Sloane Stephens.

=== 2024: First WTA 125 title and WTA 250 final ===
She qualified for her first WTA 500 tournament since the 2022 Bad Homburg Open at the San Diego Open, defeating Kayla Day in the last round of qualifying but lost to eventual runner-up, Marta Kostyuk, in the main-draw first round.

In June, Li won her first WTA 125 title at the Open Internacional de Valencia, defeating top seed Viktoriya Tomova in the final. The following month, she reached the quarterfinals in Palermo with wins over third seed Peyton Stearns, where she saved a match point, and Erika Andreeva, before losing to Irina-Camelia Begu.

Then, at the Mérida Open, she defeated eighth seed Nuria Parrizas-Diaz, Antonia Ružić Jil Teichmann and Polina Kudermetova to reach the final, which she lost to Zeynep Sönmez in straight sets.

=== 2025: Second career title, US Open fourth round ===
Li reached the final at the Singapore Open with wins over Daria Saville, lucky loser Maria Timofeeva, wildcard entrant Kimberly Birrell and top seed Anna Kalinskaya. She lost the championship match to second seed Elise Mertens, in straight sets.

At the Madrid Open, she defeated qualifier Aliaksandra Sasnovich and 25th seed Leylah Fernandez to make it into the third round, where she lost to fourth seed Coco Gauff. Li reached the quarterfinals at the Morocco Open, overcoming lucky loser Maria Timofeeva and Hailey Baptiste, before losing to eventual champion Maya Joint.

At the French Open, she defeated qualifier María Lourdes Carlé to set up a second round meeting with third seed Jessica Pegula which she lost in straight sets. Li also made the second round at Wimbledon with a win over Viktorija Golubic, only to lose to 24th seed Elise Mertens. Seeded ninth at the Prague Open, successes against qualifier Astra Sharma and Léolia Jeanjean saw her reach the quarterfinals, at which point her run was ended by fifth seed and eventual champion Marie Bouzková in three sets.

In August at Tennis in Cleveland, Li defeated Yuliia Starodubtseva, Iva Jovic, Elsa Jacquemot and second seed Wang Xinyu to make it through to the final, which she lost to qualifier Sorana Cîrstea. Li maintained her good form the following week at the US Open where wins over Rebecca Šramková, 16th seed Belinda Bencic and qualifier Priscilla Hon saw her reach the fourth round of a major for the first time, before her run was ended by fourth seed Jessica Pegula in straight sets.

In October, at the Guangzhou Open, Li defeated lucky loser Victoria Jiménez Kasintseva, Camila Osorio and Elisabetta Cocciaretto to make it through to the semifinals. She then progressed to the final when her last four opponent, wildcard entrant Zhang Shuai, retired during the first set of their match due to a hip injury. In the championship match, Li defeated qualifier Lulu Sun in straight sets to claim her second WTA title. As a result, she reached a new career-high ranking of world No. 33 on 27 October 2025.

=== 2026: WTA 1000 quarterfinal, top 30 ===
In February at the WTA 1000 Qatar Ladies Open, Li defeated Leylah Fernandez and Magdalena Fręch, before losing in the third round to lucky loser Elisabetta Cocciaretto in a match lasting two hours and 55 minutes.

Seeded fifth at the Open de Rouen in April, she recorded wins over Daria Kasatkina and Kamilla Rakhimova to reach the quarterfinals, at which point her run was ended by top seed and eventual champion Marta Kostyuk. At the Madrid Open, Li received a bye as 31st seed and then defeated Alycia Parks and world No. 4, Iga Swiatek, who retired due to illness while trailing in the third set, to make it through to the fourth round, where she lost to 24th seed Leylah Fernandez.

At the Strasbourg Open, Li reached her first WTA Tour clay court semifinal with a run which included defeating second seed Ekaterina Alexandrova and eighth seed Marie Bouzková. She lost to Emma Navarro in the last four.

In June at the Nottingham Open, Li reached her first grass court quarterfinal with wins over Kimberly Birrell and Taylah Preston She lost to Viktorija Golubic in the last eight.

Seeded 28th at the WTA 1000 Cincinnati Open, she made it through to the third round where she lost to fourth seed Coco Gauff. At the Monterrey Open, Li defeated Camila Osorio and then received a walkover when qualifier Maria Timofeeva withdrew from the tournament. Next she overcame wildcard entrant Alycia Parks, before losing to Diane Parry in the semifinals. Despite her loss, Li moved up to a career-high in the WTA rankings at world No. 28 on 31 August 2026. As 29th seed at the US Open, she lost to sixth seed Linda Nosková in the third round.

Seeded 21st at the China Open, Li received a bye and then defeated Ashlyn Krueger and ninth seed Belinda Bencic to reach the fourth round, where she lost to sixth seed Elina Svitolina. The following week at the Wuhan Open, she reached her first WTA 1000 quarterfinal by defeating lucky loser Camila Osorio, world No. 2 Aryna Sabalenka and Janice Tjen. Li lost to seventh seed Iga Świątek in the last eight. As top seed at the Japan Open, she recorded wins over qualifier Emerson Jones, Zeynep Sönmez and Lilli Tagger to make it into the semifinals, where she lost to Ashlyn Krueger.

== Personal life ==
In her spare time, Li enjoys playing the ukulele.

== Performance timeline ==
Key
W	F	SF	QF	#R	RR	Q#	DNQ	A	NH

(W) winner; (F) finalist; (SF) semifinalist; (QF) quarterfinalist; (#R) rounds 4, 3, 2, 1; (RR) round-robin stage; (Q#) qualification round; (DNQ) did not qualify; (A) absent; (NH) not held; (SR) strike rate (events won / competed); (W–L) win–loss record.
To avoid confusion and double counting, these charts are updated at the conclusion of a tournament or when the player's participation has ended.

Only main-draw results in WTA Tour, Grand Slam tournaments, Fed Cup/Billie Jean King Cup, and Olympic Games are included in win–loss records.

=== Singles ===
Current through the 2026 Wuhan Open.

Tournament	2017	2018	2019	2020	2021	2022	2023	2024	2025	2026	SR	W–L	Win %
Grand Slam tournaments
Australian Open	A	A	A	2R	3R	1R	Q2	Q2	1R	2R	0 / 5	4–5	44%
French Open	A	A	A	Q2	2R	1R	A	Q1	2R	2R	0 / 4	3–4	43%
Wimbledon	A	A	Q1	NH	1R	2R	Q2	Q1	2R	1R	0 /4	2–4	33%
US Open	Q1	Q1	Q2	3R	1R	1R	Q2	1R	4R	3R	0 / 6	7–6	54%
Win–Loss	0–0	0–0	0–0	3–2	3–4	1–4	0–0	0–1	5–4	4–4	0 / 19	16–19	46%
WTA 1000 tournaments
Qatar Open	NTI	A	NTI	A	NTI	2R	NTI	A	A	3R	0 / 2	3–2	60%
Dubai Open	A	NTI	A	NTI	A	NTI	A	A	Q1	1R	0 / 1	0–1	0%
Indian Wells Open	A	Q1	A	NH	1R	2R	1R	A	1R	1R	0 / 5	1–5	17%
Miami Open	A	Q1	A	NH	A	3R	A	A	1R	2R	0 / 3	3–3	50%
Madrid Open	A	A	A	NH	A	A	A	A	3R	4R	0 / 2	4–2	67%
Italian Open	A	A	A	NH	A	A	A	A	1R	2R	0 / 2	1–2	33%
Canadian Open	A	A	A	NH	Q2	A	A	A	1R	3R	0 / 2	1–2	33%
Cincinnati Open	A	A	A	1R	A	A	2R	A	1R	3R	0 / 4	2–4	33%
China Open	A	A	A	Not held			A	A	1R	4R	0 / 2	2–2	50%
Wuhan Open	A	A	A	Not held				A	2R	QF	0 / 2	4–2	67%
Guadalajara Open	Not held					1R	1R	Not Tier I			0 / 2	0–2	0%
Career statistics
Tournaments	0	0	0	4	12	16	4	5	25	23	Career total: 89		
Titles	0	0	0	0	1 (Note: The WTA 500 final at the 2021 Grampians Trophy was not played due to scheduling constraints related to the COVID-19 pandemic. Both players received runner-up prize money and ranking points.)	0	0	0	1	0	Career total: 2		
Finals	0	0	0	0	2	0	0	1	3	0	Career total: 6		
Overall win–loss	0–0	0–0	0–0	3–4	19–10	10–16	1–4	7–5	31–24	23–23	1 / 89	93–86	52%
Year-end ranking	583	310	148	97	47	140	174	99	38		$4,597,553		

== WTA Tour finals ==
=== Singles: 5 (2 titles, 3 runner-ups) ===
Legend WTA 500 WTA 250 (2–3)	Finals by surface Hard (2–3) Clay (0–0)	Finals by setting Outdoor (2–2) Indoor (0–1)

Result	W–L	Date	Tournament	Tier	Surface	Opponent	Score
Finalist	NP	Feb 2021	Grampians Trophy, Australia	WTA 500	Hard	(Estonia) Anett Kontaveit	cancelled
Win	1–0	Oct 2021	Tenerife Ladies Open, Spain	WTA 250	Hard	(Colombia) Camila Osorio	6–1, 6–4
Loss	1–1	Oct 2024	Mérida Open, Mexico	WTA 250	Hard	(Turkey) Zeynep Sönmez	2–6, 1–6
Loss	1–2	Feb 2025	Singapore Open, Singapore	WTA 250	Hard (i)	(Belgium) Elise Mertens	1–6, 4–6
Loss	1–3	Aug 2025	Tennis in Cleveland, US	WTA 250	Hard	(Romania) Sorana Cîrstea	1–6, 4–6
Win	2–3	Oct 2025	Guangzhou Open, China	WTA 250	Hard	(New Zealand) Lulu Sun	7–6^{(8–6)}, 6–2

== WTA 125 finals ==
=== Singles: 2 (1 title, 1 runner-up) ===
Result	W–L	Date	Tournament	Surface	Opponent	Score
Win	1–0	Jun 2024	Internacional de Valencia, Spain	Clay	(Bulgaria) Viktoriya Tomova	6–3, 6–4
Loss	1–1	Jul 2024	Båstad Open, Sweden	Clay	(Italy) Martina Trevisan	2–6, 2–6

== ITF Circuit finals ==
=== Singles: 10 (3 titles, 7 runner-ups) ===
Legend
W100 tournaments (0–3)
W80 tournaments (1–0)
W60 tournaments (0–3)
W25 tournaments (1–1)
W15 tournaments (1–0)

Result	W–L	Date	Tournament	Tier	Surface	Opponent	Score
Win	1–0	Jul 2017	ITF Evansville, United States	W15	Hard	(Mexico) Marcela Zacarías	4–6, 6–4, 6–3
Loss	1–1	Aug 2018	Lexington Challenger, United States	W60	Hard	(United States) Asia Muhammad	5–7, 1–6
Loss	1–2	Apr 2019	ITF Jackson, United States	W25	Clay	(Poland) Katarzyna Kawa	3–6, 2–6
Win	2–2	Apr 2019	Osprey Challenger, US	W25	Clay	(United States) Usue Maitane Arconada	6–3, 7–5
Loss	2–3	May 2019	Bonita Springs Championship, US	W100	Clay	(United States) Lauren Davis	5–7, 5–7
Loss	2–4	Aug 2019	Lexington Challenger, US	W60	Hard	(South Korea) Kim Da-bin	1–6, 3–6
Loss	2–5	Aug 2019	Concord Tennis Open, US	W60	Hard	(United States) Caroline Dolehide	3–6, 5–7
Win	3–5	Oct 2020	Tyler Pro Challenge, US	W80	Hard	(Ukraine) Marta Kostyuk	7–5, 1–6, 6–3
Loss	3–6	May 2023	Bonita Springs Championship, US	W100	Clay	(United States) Kayla Day	2–6, 2–6
Loss	3–7	Oct 2024	Tennis Classic of Macon, US	W100	Hard	(Russia) Anna Blinkova	6–2, 2–6, 6–7^{(4)}

=== Doubles: 3 (3 runner-ups) ===
Legend
W100 tournaments (0–2)
W60 tournaments (0–1)

Result	W–L	Date	Tournament	Tier	Surface	Partner	Opponents	Score
Loss	0–1	Feb 2019	Midland Tennis Classic, US	W100	Hard (i)	(United States) Coco Gauff	(Belarus) Olga Govortsova (Russia) Valeria Savinykh	4–6, 0–6
Loss	0–2	Aug 2019	Lexington Challenger, US	W60	Hard	(United States) Jamie Loeb	(United States) Robin Anderson (France) Jessika Ponchet	6–7^{(4)}, 7–6^{(5)}, [7–10]
Loss	0–3	Feb 2024	Guanajuato Open, Mexico	W100	Hard	(Canada) Rebecca Marino	(United States) Hailey Baptiste (United States) Whitney Osuigwe	5–7, 4–6

== Junior Grand Slam tournament finals ==
=== Singles: 1 (runner-up) ===
Result	Year	Tournament	Surface	Opponent	Score
Loss	2017	Wimbledon	Grass	(United States) Claire Liu	2–6, 7–5, 2–6

== Wins against top 10 players ==
- Li has a 3–14 record against players who were, at the time the match was played, ranked in the top 10.

No.	Player	Rk	Event	Surface	Rd	Score	Rk	Years	Ref
1	(Estonia) Anett Kontaveit	7	Miami Open, US	Hard	2R	6–0, 3–6, 6–4	65	2022	
2	(Poland) Iga Świątek	4	Madrid Open, Spain	Clay	3R	7–6^{(7–4)}, 2–6, 3–0 ret.	34	2026	
3	Aryna Sabalenka	2	Wuhan Open, China	Hard	2R	3–6, 6–4, 7–6^{(7–5)}	31	2026	

- Key: (Rk) first use, opponent rank; (Rd) round; (Rk) 2nd use, player rank; (Ref) reference; (F) final; (SF) semifinal; (QF) quarterfinal; (#R) rounds 4, 3, 2, 1; (RR) round-robin stage; (Q#) qualifying rounds or stages (3), 2, 1.
