= Guía de Isora =

- Municipality
- Flag Coat of arms

- Municipal location in Tenerife

- Location in Tenerife Guía de Isora (Canary Islands) Guía de Isora (Spain, Canary Islands)
- Coordinates: 28°12′40″N 16°46′50″W
- Country: Spain
- Autonomous Community: Canary Islands
- Province: Tenerife
- Island: Tenerife

Government
  - Mayor: Pedro Martín Domínguez (PSOE)

Area
  - Total: 143.4 km^{2} (55.4 sq mi)
- Elevation (AMSL): 540 m (1,770 ft)

Population (2025)
  - Total: 22,846
  - Density: 159.3/km^{2} (412.6/sq mi)
  - Town/Settlement: 4,926
- Time zone: UTC+0 (CET)
  - Summer (DST): UTC+1 (CEST (GMT +1))
- Postal code: 38680
- Area code: +34 (Spain) + 922 (Tenerife)
- Climate: Csb
- Website: www.guiadeisora.es

Guía de Isora is a municipality in the western part of the island of Tenerife, one of the Canary Islands, and part of the Province of Santa Cruz de Tenerife. As of 2018, the population was 20,991.), and the area is 143 km. The town Guía de Isora is 5 km from the coast, 16 km northwest of Arona and 60 km southwest of the island's capital Santa Cruz de Tenerife.

== Historical population ==
Year	Population
1991	11,915
1996	12,560
2001	14,982
2002	16,320
2003	17,163
2004	17,816
2013	20,537
2018	20,991
