= Ellen Perez =

Australian tennis player (born 1995)

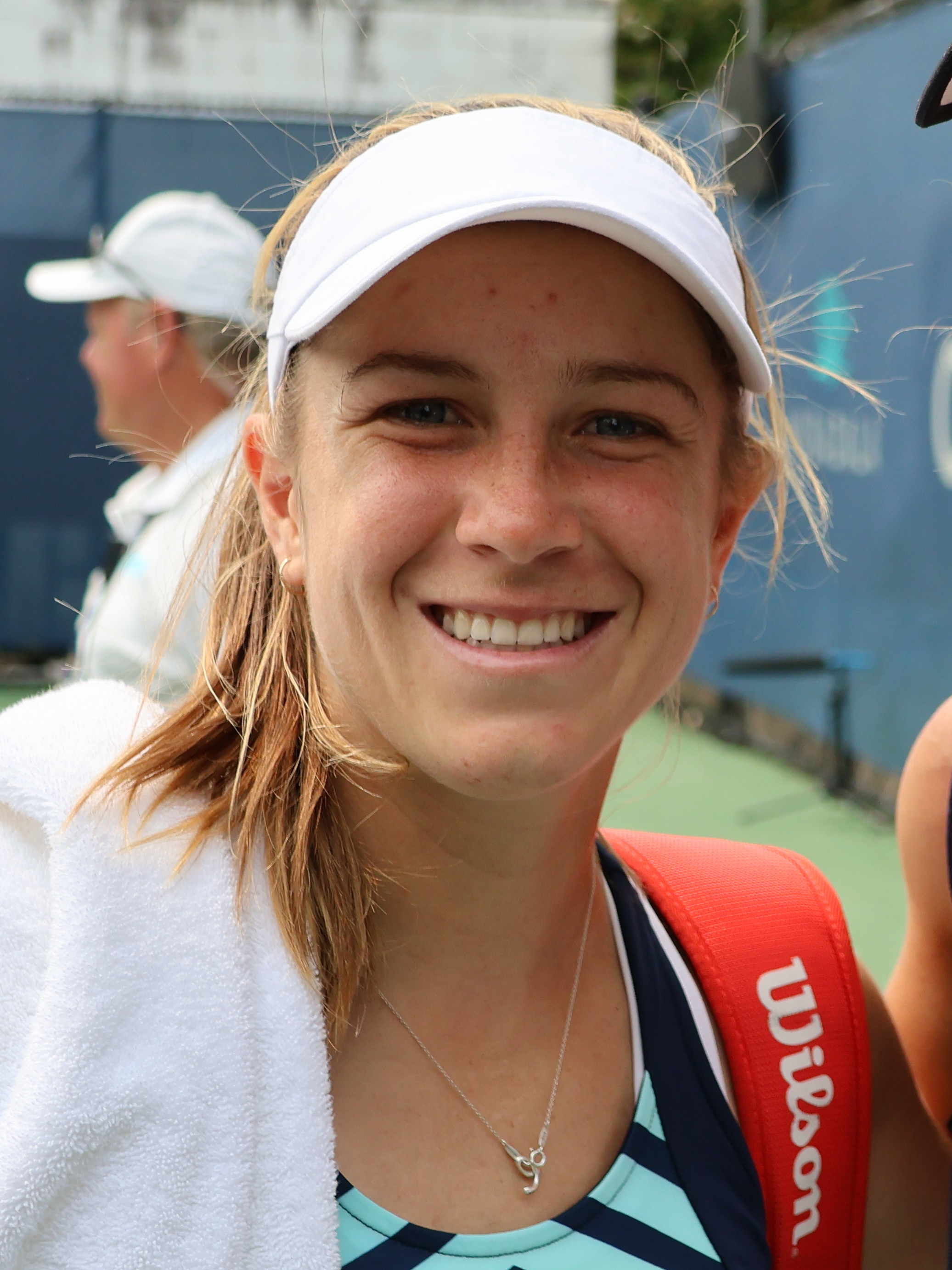
- Perez in 2023
- Country (sports): Australia
- Residence: Melbourne
- Born: 10 October 1995 (age 31) Shellharbour, New South Wales, Australia
- Height: 1.69 m (5 ft 7 in)
- Plays: Left (two-handed backhand)
- College: University of Georgia (2014–2017)
- Prize money: $3,285,889

Singles
- Career record: 189–165
- Career titles: 2 ITF
- Highest ranking: No. 162 (12 August 2019)
- Current ranking: No. 1,452 (2 November 2026)

Grand Slam singles results
- Australian Open: 1R (2019)
- French Open: Q3 (2021)
- Wimbledon: 1R (2021)
- US Open: 1R (2016)

Doubles
- Career record: 394–225
- Career titles: 8
- Highest ranking: No. 7 (22 April 2024)
- Current ranking: No. 20 (10 August 2026)

Grand Slam doubles results
- Australian Open: 3R (2026)
- French Open: SF (2023)
- Wimbledon: QF (2022, 2026)
- US Open: SF (2022)

Other doubles tournaments
- Tour Finals: F (2023)
- Olympic Games: QF (2021)

Grand Slam mixed doubles results
- Australian Open: QF (2025)
- French Open: QF (2024)
- Wimbledon: QF (2023)
- US Open: QF (2021, 2023, 2024)

Other mixed doubles tournaments
- Olympic Games: 1R (2024)

Team competitions
- BJK Cup: F (2022), record 5–4
- Last updated on: 6 November 2026.

Ellen Perez (born 10 October 1995) is an Australian professional tennis player. On April 2024, she peaked at No. 7 in the WTA doubles rankings. Perez has won eight doubles titles on the WTA Tour with three doubles titles on the WTA Challenger Tour.

She reached a best singles ranking of No. 162 in August 2019. On the ITF Circuit she has won 2 singles and 19 doubles titles. Perez made her major main-draw debut at the 2016 Australian Open in doubles with Belinda Woolcock; they lost in the first round to Jessica Moore and Storm Sanders. Perez made her first singles major appearance at the 2016 US Open, after winning the Australian Wildcard Play-off.

== Personal life ==
Ellen is the daughter of John and Milića Perez. Ellen is of Spanish descent on her father's side and of Macedonian descent on her mother's side. She picked up a tennis racket at the age of three after receiving a totem tennis pole as a Christmas gift, and she started regular coaching at the age of seven. In 2012, she won the Gallipoli Youth Cup held in Ipswich, Queensland.

She played three seasons of college tennis at the University of Georgia in the United States from 2014 to 2017. She was named an All-American five times across singles and doubles.

== Career ==
=== 2012–2014: The beginnings ===
Perez made her debut on the ITF Women's Circuit in March 2012 in Bundaberg, losing in three sets to Jennifer Elie. In September 2013, she recorded her first main-draw singles win in Toowoomba after qualifying. Perez reached the quarterfinals before losing to Azra Hadzic. In December 2013, she won her first ITF doubles title in Hong Kong with Abbie Myers.

In 2014, Perez reached the quarterfinal of the Burnie International and Melbourne, and then competed on the ITF Circuit in Europe until June when she started attending college in the United States. Perez ended 2014 with a singles rank of 655 and a doubles rank of 517.

=== 2015–2016: Grand Slam tournament debut ===
In June 2015, Perez returned to play at Bethany Beach where she qualified and reached the singles quarterfinals and the doubles final. The following week in Charlotte, she reached the doubles final. She played ITF events across the U.S. for the remainder of 2015.

Perez started her 2016 season in June in the U.S. without qualifying for the main draw. In July, she qualified for and won her first singles ITF title in Brussels without dropping a set. She reached a semifinal and final at two subsequent events. Perez won four doubles titles in five weeks across June and July 2016.

In August, Perez won the Australian Wildcard Play-off to make her major singles debut at the US Open, where she lost to Zhang Shuai in straight sets. Perez said of the experience, "It definitely didn't go as planned, or as hoped, but it was great to be able to have my Grand Slam debut and get out on court in front of all the fans and what-not. It was nice." She ended 2016 with a singles rank of 632 and doubles rank of 414.

=== 2017–2018: First WTA Tour match win ===
Perez began the season with a wildcard into the Sydney International qualifying where she defeated Kateryna Kozlova, ranked 101 in the world. She lost to Naomi Broady in the second round. At the Australian Open qualifying, Perez defeated Tadeja Majerič, then lost to Ana Bogdan.

She returned to play in June and reached three consecutive doubles finals, winning one. Doubles success continued throughout the rest of the year. In July, Perez qualified for and reached the singles final of Gatineau. This increased her singles ranking to a career high of 363. Perez returned to Australia and reached the semifinals of Toowoomba and the quarterfinals at Cairns.

Perez began the 2018 season, after being given a wildcard into the Sydney International, where she upset world No. 11, Kristina Mladenovic, in the first round. Her first win on the WTA Tour came when Mladenovic retired with the score 4–6, 2–4. Perez lost in round two to Ashleigh Barty.

At the Australian Open, Perez lost in the first round of qualifying to Valentini Grammatikopoulou. She made the second round at the Burnie International, Launceston International and at Perth, and then reached the final of the Clay Court International in April, losing to Jaimee Fourlis. Perez traveled to Europe and North America's ITF Circuit with limited success. In September, she attempted to qualify for two WTA tournaments in Asia before returning to Australia in October, where she reached four consecutive ITF finals.

=== 2019–2021: Three career titles, Olympics debut and quarterfinals in doubles ===
Perez commenced 2021 retiring in the first round of the Grampians Trophy. She made the second round of qualifying in both the Australian Open and Adelaide International. In March, she won the Abierto Zapopan in doubles with Astra Sharma; it was her second WTA Tour title.

In May, Perez reached the third and final round of French Open qualifying. In June, she qualified for Wimbledon but lost in the first round to fellow qualifier Clara Burel.

In July, Perez partnered Samantha Stosur in women's doubles at the 2020 Olympic Games, where they reached the quarterfinals. In the same month, Perez reached the final of an ITF event in Lisbon, Portugal. In October, she reached another ITF final in Portugal. She won her third title at the 2021 Tenerife Ladies Open with Ulrikke Eikeri. Perez ended 2021 with a singles rank of 196 and a doubles rank of 42.

=== 2022: US Open SF, Wimbledon QF, two WTA 1000 finals & top 30 ===
Perez lost in the first round of Australian Open qualifying.

She reached the quarterfinals at Wimbledon, having never won a match before at this major, and back-to-back WTA 1000 doubles finals at the Canadian Open and the Cincinnati Open with Nicole Melichar. Perez also reached the US Open semifinals for the first time, having never gotten past the third round at this major, where she and Melichar lost to the third-seeded Czech duo of Krejčíková and Siniaková.

=== 2023–2025: Major semifinal, WTA Finals debut & finalist, world No. 7 ===
At the French Open, with Nicole Melichar-Martinez, Perez reached the quarterfinals for the first time, having never previously progressed beyond the second round at this major. With her win over the protected ranking pair of Sara Sorribes Tormo and Marie Bouzková, she became the 21st Australian woman to advance to a Roland Garros semifinal in doubles in the Open Era.

She qualified for the 2023 WTA Finals and reached the final with Melichar-Martinez, a first time at this level for both players. They lost to Laura Siegemund and Vera Zvonareva in the championship match.

She reached her fourth WTA 1000 final at the 2024 Dubai Tennis Championships with Melichar-Martinez, losing to fourth seeds Storm Hunter and Kateřina Siniaková. As the top seeds, they won the 2024 Bad Homburg Open, defeating Chan Hao-ching and Veronika Kudermetova in the final.

The pair reached the quarterfinals at the 2024 US Open with a straight-sets victory against the 11th seeds Sorribes Tormo and Bouzková, marking their best result at a major since Roland Garros in the previous year, when they progressed to the semifinals.

Perez and Melichar-Martinez qualified for the 2024 WTA Finals and reached the semifinals, after compiling a record of two wins and one loss in the group stage. They lost in the last four to second seeds Gabriela Dabrowski and Erin Routliffe, in straight sets.

In 2025, at the start of the Middle East Swing, she claimed the title in Abu Dhabi, partnering with Jelena Ostapenko. As a result, she returned to the top 10 in the doubles rankings on 10 February 2025.

== Performance timelines ==
Key
W	F	SF	QF	#R	RR	Q#	P#	DNQ	A	Z#	PO	G	S	B	NMS	NTI	P	NH

(W) winner; (F) finalist; (SF) semifinalist; (QF) quarterfinalist; (#R) rounds 4, 3, 2, 1; (RR) round-robin stage; (Q#) qualification round; (P#) preliminary round; (DNQ) did not qualify; (A) absent; (Z#) Davis/Fed Cup Zonal Group (with number indication) or (PO) play-off; (G) gold, (S) silver or (B) bronze Olympic/Paralympic medal; (NMS) not a Masters tournament; (NTI) not a Tier I tournament; (P) postponed; (NH) not held; (SR) strike rate (events won / competed); (W–L) win–loss record.
To avoid confusion and double counting, these charts are updated at the conclusion of a tournament or when the player's participation has ended.

Only main-draw results in WTA Tour, Grand Slam tournaments, Fed Cup/Billie Jean King Cup and Olympic Games are included in win–loss records.

=== Singles ===
Current through the 2023 Guadalajara Open.

Tournament	2016	2017	2018	2019	2020	2021	2022	2023	SR	W–L	Win %
Grand Slam tournaments
Australian Open	A	Q2	Q1	1R	Q1	Q2	Q1	Q2	0 / 1	0–1	
French Open	A	A	A	A	A	Q3	Q1	A	0 / 0	0–0	
Wimbledon	A	A	A	Q1	NH	1R	Q1	A	0 / 1	0–1	
US Open	1R	A	A	Q2	A	Q1	A	A	0 / 1	0–1	
Win–loss	0–1	0–0	0–0	0–1	0–0	0–1	0–0	0–0	0 / 3	0–3	
WTA 1000 tournaments
Qatar Open	A	NTI	A	NTI	A	NTI	Q1	NTI	0 / 0	0–0	
Dubai Championships	NTI	A	NTI	A	NTI	A	NTI	A	0 / 0	0–0	
Italian Open	A	A	A	A	A	A	Q1	A	0 / 0	0–0	
Canadian Open	A	A	A	A	NH	A	Q2	A	0 / 0	0–0	
Wuhan Open	A	A	A	Q2	Not Held				0 / 0	0–0	
Guadalajara Open	Not Held						A	Q1	0 / 0	0–0	
Career statistics
Tournaments	1	0	1	3	3	2	3	1	Career total: 14		
Overall win-loss	0–1	0–0	1–1	0–3	0–3	0–2	0–3	0–1	0 / 14	1–14	
Year-end ranking	632	343	181	241	234	193	363	500	$1,118,635		

=== Doubles ===
Current through the 2026 Wimbledon Championships.

Tournament	2016	2017	2018	2019	2020	2021	2022	2023	2024	2025	2026	SR	W–L	Win%
Grand Slam tournaments
Australian Open	1R	1R	2R	1R	1R	1R	2R	2R	1R	2R	3R	0 / 11	6–11	35%
French Open	A	A	A	A	1R	2R	1R	SF	3R	1R	QF	0 / 7	10–7	59%
Wimbledon	A	A	Q1	1R	NH	1R	QF	1R	2R	3R	QF	0 / 7	9–7	56%
US Open	A	A	A	3R	1R	2R	SF	2R	QF	1R	3R	0 / 8	13–8	62%
Win–loss	0–1	0–1	1–1	2–3	0–3	2–4	8–4	6–4	6–4	3–4	10–4	0 / 33	38–33	54%
Year-end championships
WTA Finals	DNQ				NH	DNQ	Alt	F	SF	DNQ		0 / 2	5–4	56%
National representation
Summer Olympics	A	Not Held				QF	Not Held		1R	Not Held		0 / 2	2–2	50%
Billie Jean King Cup	A	A	A	A	SF (Note: Edition is split into the two years due to COVID-19.)		F	RR	QF	QR		0 / 5	4–3	57%
WTA 1000 tournaments
Qatar Open	A	NTI	A	NTI	A	NTI	2R	NTI	2R	QF	2R			
Dubai Championships	NTI	A	NTI	A	NTI	A	NTI	1R	F	1R	QF			
Indian Wells Open	A	A	A	A	NH	A	A	2R	SF	QF	QF	0 / 4	8–4	67%
Miami Open	A	A	A	A	NH	1R	A	SF	2R	1R	1R	0 / 5	4–5	44%
Madrid Open	A	A	A	A	NH	QF	2R	1R	1R	2R	QF	0 / 6	6–6	50%
Italian Open	A	A	A	A	1R	2R	2R	A	1R	SF	QF	0 / 6	7–6	54%
Canadian Open	A	A	A	A	NH	QF	F	QF	1R	2R	QF	0 / 6	10–6	63%
Cincinnati Open	A	A	A	A	QF	2R	F	F	SF	SF	1R	0 / 7	18–7	72%
China Open	A	A	A	A	Not Held			QF	1R	2R		0 / 3	3–3	50%
Wuhan Open	A	A	A	1R	Not Held				QF	2R		0 / 3	2–3	40%
Guadalajara Open	Not Held						2R	1R	Not Tier I			0 / 2	1–2	33%
Career statistics
Tournaments	1	1	6	11	12	20	19	21	27	27	18	Career total: 170		
Titles	0	0	0	1	0	2	2	0	2	1	0	Career total: 8		
Finals	0	0	0	2	2	4	5	3	4	1	1	Career total: 24		
Overall win–loss	0–1	0–1	5–6	12–10	12–11	28–19	35–18	30–25	40–25	38–26	29–16	7 / 172	231–172	57%
Year-end ranking	414	205	88	65	48	42	20	17	13	23				

=== Mixed doubles ===
Tournament	2018	2019	2020	2021	2022	2023	2024	2025	2026	SR	W–L
Australian Open	1R	A	1R	2R	2R	A	2R	QF	1R	0 / 7	5–7
French Open	A	A	NH	A	A	1R	QF	1R	1R	0 / 4	2–4
Wimbledon	A	A	NH	A	2R	QF	1R	1R	2R	0 / 5	4–5
US Open	A	A	NH	QF	2R	QF	QF	A	A	0 / 4	7–4
Win–loss	0–1	0–0	0–1	3–2	3–3	4–3	5–4	2–3	1–3	0 / 20	18–20

== Significant finals ==
=== Year-end championships ===
==== Doubles: 1 (runner-up) ====
Result	Year	Tournament	Surface	Partner	Opponents	Score
Loss	2023	WTA Finals, Cancún	Hard	(United States) Nicole Melichar-Martinez	(Germany) Laura Siegemund; Vera Zvonareva	4–6, 4–6

=== WTA 1000 tournaments ===
==== Doubles: 4 (runner-ups) ====
Result	Year	Tournament	Surface	Partner	Opponents	Score
Loss	2022	Canadian Open	Hard	(United States) Nicole Melichar-Martinez	(United States) Coco Gauff (United States) Jessica Pegula	4–6, 7–6^{(7–5)}, [5–10]
Loss	2022	Cincinnati Open	Hard	(United States) Nicole Melichar-Martinez	(Ukraine) Lyudmyla Kichenok (Latvia) Jeļena Ostapenko	6–7^{(5–7)}, 3–6
Loss	2023	Cincinnati Open	Hard	(United States) Nicole Melichar-Martinez	(United States) Alycia Parks (United States) Taylor Townsend	7–6^{(7–1)}, 4–6, [6–10]
Loss	2024	Dubai Open	Hard	(United States) Nicole Melichar-Martinez	(Australia) Storm Hunter (Czech Republic) Kateřina Siniaková	4–6, 2–6

== WTA Tour finals ==
=== Doubles: 25 (8 titles, 17 runner-ups) ===
Legend WTA Finals (0–1) WTA 1000 (0–4) WTA 500 (3–5) International / WTA 250 (5–7)	Finals by surface Hard (5–11) Grass (2–4) Clay (1–2)

Result	W–L	Date	Tournament	Tier	Surface	Partner	Opponents	Score
Win	1–0	May 2019	Internationaux de Strasbourg, France	International	Clay	(Australia) Daria Gavrilova	(China) Duan Yingying (China) Han Xinyun	6–4, 6–3
Loss	1–1	Jun 2019	Nottingham Open, United Kingdom	International	Grass	(Australia) Arina Rodionova	(United States) Desirae Krawczyk (Mexico) Giuliana Olmos	6–7^{(5–7)}, 5–7
Loss	1–2	Feb 2020	Hua Hin Championships, Thailand	International	Hard	(Austria) Barbara Haas	(Australia) Arina Rodionova (Australia) Storm Sanders	3–6, 3–6
Loss	1–3	Sep 2020	İstanbul Cup, Turkey	International	Clay	(Australia) Storm Sanders	(Chile) Alexa Guarachi (United States) Desirae Krawczyk	1–6, 3–6
Win	2–3	Mar 2021	Abierto Zapopan, Mexico	WTA 250	Hard	(Australia) Astra Sharma	(United States) Desirae Krawczyk (Mexico) Giuliana Olmos	6–4, 6–4
Loss	2–4	Apr 2021	Charleston Open, United States	WTA 250	Clay	(Australia) Storm Sanders	(United States) Hailey Baptiste (United States) Caty McNally	7–6^{(7–4)}, 4–6, [6–10]
Loss	2–5	Jun 2021	Birmingham Classic, United Kingdom	WTA 250	Grass	(Tunisia) Ons Jabeur	(Czech Republic) Marie Bouzková (Czech Republic) Lucie Hradecká	4–6, 6–2, [8–10]
Win	3–5	Oct 2021	Tenerife Ladies Open, Spain	WTA 250	Hard	(Norway) Ulrikke Eikeri	(Ukraine) Lyudmyla Kichenok (Ukraine) Marta Kostyuk	6–3, 6–3
Win	4–5	Jun 2022	Rosmalen Open, Netherlands	WTA 250	Grass	(Slovenia) Tamara Zidanšek	(Russia) Veronika Kudermetova (Belgium) Elise Mertens	6–3, 5–7, [12–10]
Loss	4–6	Aug 2022	Canadian Open, Toronto	WTA 1000	Hard	(United States) Nicole Melichar-Martinez	(United States) Coco Gauff (United States) Jessica Pegula	4–6, 7–6^{(7–5)}, [5–10]
Loss	4–7	Aug 2022	Cincinnati Open, United States	WTA 1000	Hard	(United States) Nicole Melichar-Martinez	(Ukraine) Lyudmyla Kichenok (Latvia) Jeļena Ostapenko	6–7^{(5–7)}, 3–6
Win	5–7	Aug 2022	Tennis in Cleveland, United States	WTA 250	Hard	(United States) Nicole Melichar-Martinez	(Kazakhstan) Anna Danilina (Serbia) Aleksandra Krunić	7–5, 6–3
Loss	5–8	Sep 2022	Pan Pacific Open, Japan	WTA 500	Hard	(United States) Nicole Melichar-Martinez	(Canada) Gabriela Dabrowski (Mexico) Giuliana Olmos	4–6, 4–6
Loss	5–9	Mar 2023	Texas Open, United States	WTA 250	Hard	(United States) Nicole Melichar-Martinez	(New Zealand) Erin Routliffe (Indonesia) Aldila Sutjiadi	4–6, 6–3, [8–10]
Loss	5–10	Jul 2023	Eastbourne International, United Kingdom	WTA 500	Grass	(United States) Nicole Melichar-Martinez	(Netherlands) Demi Schuurs (United States) Desirae Krawczyk	2–6, 4–6
Loss	5–11	Aug 2023	Cincinnati Open, United States	WTA 1000	Hard	(United States) Nicole Melichar-Martinez	(United States) Alycia Parks (United States) Taylor Townsend	7–6^{(7–1)}, 4–6, [6–10]
Loss	5–12	Aug 2023	Tennis in Cleveland, United States	WTA 250	Hard	(United States) Nicole Melichar-Martinez	(Japan) Miyu Kato (Indonesia) Aldila Sutjiadi	4–6, 7–6^{(7–4)}, [8–10]
Loss	5–13	Nov 2023	WTA Finals, Mexico	Finals	Hard	(United States) Nicole Melichar-Martinez	(Germany) Laura Siegemund; Vera Zvonareva	4–6, 4–6
Loss	5–14	Feb 2024	Ladies Linz, Austria	WTA 500	Hard (i)	(United States) Nicole Melichar-Martinez	(Italy) Sara Errani (Italy) Jasmine Paolini	5–7, 6–4, [7–10]
Loss	5–15	Feb 2024	Dubai Championships, United Arab Emirates	WTA 1000	Hard	(United States) Nicole Melichar-Martinez	(Australia) Storm Hunter (Czech Republic) Kateřina Siniaková	4–6, 2–6
Win	6–15	Mar 2024	San Diego Open, United States	WTA 500	Hard	(United States) Nicole Melichar-Martinez	(United States) Desirae Krawczyk (United States) Jessica Pegula	6–1, 6–2
Win	7–15	Jun 2024	Bad Homburg Open, Germany	WTA 500	Grass	(United States) Nicole Melichar-Martinez	(Chinese Taipei) Chan Hao-ching; Veronika Kudermetova	4–6, 6–3, [10–8]
Win	8–15	Feb 2025	Abu Dhabi Open, UAE	WTA 500	Hard	(Latvia) Jelena Ostapenko	(France) Kristina Mladenovic (China) Zhang Shuai	6–2, 6–1
Loss	8–16	Jan 2026	Brisbane International, Australia	WTA 500	Hard	(Spain) Cristina Bucșa	(Chinese Taipei) Hsieh Su-wei (Latvia) Jeļena Ostapenko	2–6, 1–6
Loss	8–17	Jun 2026	Bad Homburg Open, Germany	WTA 500	Grass	(Netherlands) Demi Schuurs	Vera Zvonareva (Indonesia) Aldila Sutjiadi	1–6, 6–4, [5–10]

== WTA 125 finals ==
=== Doubles: 3 (3 titles) ===
Result	W–L	Date	Tournament	Surface	Partner	Opponents	Score
Win	1–0	Nov 2019	Houston Challenger, US	Hard	(Brazil) Luisa Stefani	(Canada) Sharon Fichman (Japan) Ena Shibahara	1–6, 6–4, [10–5]
Win	2–0	May 2023	Catalonia Open, Spain	Clay	(Australia) Storm Hunter	(Chile) Alexa Guarachi (New Zealand) Erin Routliffe	6–1, 7–6^{(10–8)}
Win	3–0	May 2024	Catalonia Open, Spain (2)	Clay	(United States) Nicole Melichar-Martinez	(Poland) Katarzyna Piter (Egypt) Mayar Sherif	7–5, 6–2

== ITF Circuit finals ==
=== Singles: 11 (2 titles, 9 runner-ups) ===
Legend $60,000 tournaments (1–2) $25,000 tournaments (0–6) $10,000 tournaments (1–1)	Finals by surface Hard (1–7) Clay (1–2)

Result	W–L	Date	Tournament	Tier	Surface	Opponent	Score
Win	1–0	Jul 2016	ITF Brussels, Belgium	10,000	Clay	(Belgium) Kimberley Zimmermann	6–2, 6–3
Loss	1–1	Aug 2016	ITF Rebecq, Belgium	10,000	Clay	(Belgium) Hélène Scholsen	6–3, 1–6, 2–6
Loss	1–2	Jul 2017	Gatineau Challenger, Canada	25,000	Hard	(Canada) Aleksandra Wozniak	6–7^{(4)}, 4–6
Loss	1–3	Apr 2018	Clay Court International, Australia	25,000	Clay	(Australia) Jaimee Fourlis	3–6, 2–6
Loss	1–4	Sep 2018	Darwin International, Australia	60,000	Hard	(Australia) Kimberly Birrell	3–6, 3–6
Loss	1–5	Oct 2018	ITF Brisbane, Australia	25,000	Hard	(China) Xu Shilin	4–6, 3–6
Loss	1–6	Oct 2018	ITF Toowoomba, Australia	25,000	Hard	(Australia) Zoe Hives	0–6, 2–6
Loss	1–7	Oct 2018	Bendigo International, Australia	60,000	Hard	(Australia) Priscilla Hon	4–6, 6–4, 5–7
Win	2–7	Jul 2019	Ashland Classic, United States	W60	Hard	(Australia) Zoe Hives	6–3, 3–2 ret.
Loss	2–8	Jul 2021	ITF Lisbon, Portugal	W25	Hard	(Switzerland) Lulu Sun	4–6, 4–6
Loss	2–9	Oct 2021	ITF Loulé, Portugal	W25	Hard	(France) Harmony Tan	4–6, 4–6

=== Doubles: 29 (19 titles, 10 runner-ups) ===
Legend $100,000 tournaments (1–1) $60,000 tournaments (7–2) $25,000 tournaments (7–4) $10/15,000 tournaments (4–3)	Finals by surface Hard (14–5) Clay (4–4) Grass (1–1)

Result	W–L	Date	Tournament	Tier	Surface	Partner	Opponents	Score
Win	1–0	Dec 2013	ITF Hong Kong, China SAR	10,000	Hard	(Australia) Abbie Myers	(Chinese Taipei) Lee Ya-hsuan (Chinese Taipei) Chuang Chia-jung	4–6, 6–3, [10–8]
Loss	1–1	Apr 2014	ITF Glen Iris, Australia	15,000	Hard	(Australia) Tammi Patterson	(Bulgaria) Aleksandrina Naydenova (Australia) Jessica Moore	4–6, 2–6
Loss	1–2	Jun 2015	ITF Bethany Beach, United States	10,000	Clay	(Australia) Belinda Woolcock	(United States) Andie Daniell (United States) Sophie Chang	4–6, 1–6
Loss	1–3	Jun 2015	ITF Charlotte, United States	10,000	Clay	(United States) Lauren Herring	(Brazil) Maria Fernanda Alves (Mexico) Renata Zarazúa	4–6, 7–6^{(6)}, [8–10]
Win	2–3	Jun 2016	ITF Baton Rouge, United States	25,000	Hard	(United States) Lauren Herring	(United States) Jamie Loeb (United States) Ingrid Neel	6–3, 6–3
Win	3–3	Jul 2016	ITF Brussels, Belgium	10,000	Clay	(Brazil) Carolina Alves	(Switzerland) Karin Kennel (Belgium) Hélène Scholsen	6–2, 6–3
Win	4–3	Jul 2016	ITF Saint-Gervais, France	10,000	Clay	(Australia) Abbie Myers	(Oman) Fatma Al-Nabhani (France) Estelle Cascino	7–6^{(5)}, 6–2
Win	5–3	Jul 2016	ITF Maaseik, Belgium	10,000	Clay	(Australia) Sally Peers	(Belgium) Deborah Kerfs (United States) Chiara Scholl	6–2, 6–2
Loss	5–4	Jun 2017	ITF Sumter, United States	25,000	Hard	(Brazil) Luisa Stefani	(United States) Kaitlyn Christian (Mexico) Giuliana Olmos	2–6, 6–3, [7–10]
Win	6–4	Jun 2017	ITF Baton Rouge, United States	25,000	Hard	(Brazil) Luisa Stefani	(United States) Francesca Di Lorenzo (United States) Julia Elbaba	6–3, 6–4
Loss	6–5	Jul 2017	ITF Auburn, United States	25,000	Hard	(Brazil) Luisa Stefani	(United States) Emina Bektas (Chile) Alexa Guarachi	6–4, 4–6, [5–10]
Win	7–5	Jul 2017	Challenger de Granby, Canada	60,000	Hard	(Canada) Carol Zhao	(Chile) Alexa Guarachi (Australia) Olivia Tjandramulia	6–2, 6–2
Win	8–5	Aug 2017	ITF Fort Worth, United States	25,000	Hard	(Mexico) Giuliana Olmos	(Japan) Miharu Imanishi (Japan) Ayaka Okuno	6–4, 6–3
Loss	8–6	Nov 2017	Canberra International, Australia	60,000	Hard	(Australia) Jessica Moore	(United States) Asia Muhammad (Australia) Arina Rodionova	4–6, 4–6
Win	9–6	Feb 2018	Launceston International, Australia	25,000	Hard	(Australia) Jessica Moore	(United Kingdom) Laura Robson (Russia) Valeria Savinykh	7–6^{(5)}, 6–4
Win	10–6	Feb 2018	ITF Perth, Australia	25,000	Hard	(Australia) Jessica Moore	(Australia) Olivia Tjandramulia (Australia) Belinda Woolcock	6–7^{(6)}, 6–1, [7–9] ret.
Loss	10–7	May 2018	ITF Caserta, Italy	25,000	Clay	(Australia) Jaimee Fourlis	(Chinese Taipei) Chen Pei-hsuan (Chinese Taipei) Wu Fang-hsien	6–7^{(6)}, 3–6
Win	11–7	Jun 2018	Surbiton Trophy, United Kingdom	100,000	Grass	(Australia) Jessica Moore	(Australia) Arina Rodionova (Belgium) Yanina Wickmayer	4–6, 7–5, [10–3]
Loss	11–8	Jul 2018	Berkeley Club Challenge, US	60,000	Hard	(United States) Sabrina Santamaria	(United States) Nicole Gibbs (United States) Asia Muhammad	4–6, 1–6
Win	12–8	Jul 2018	Challenger de Granby, Canada (2)	60,000	Hard	(Australia) Arina Rodionova	(Japan) Erika Sema (Japan) Aiko Yoshitomi	7–5, 6–4
Win	13–8	Aug 2018	Landisville Tennis Challenge, US	60,000	Hard	(Australia) Arina Rodionova	(Chinese Taipei) Chen Pei-hsuan (Chinese Taipei) Wu Fang-hsien	6–0, 6–2
Win	14–8	Oct 2018	Bendigo International, Australia	60,000	Hard	(Australia) Arina Rodionova	(Japan) Eri Hozumi (Japan) Risa Ozaki	7–5, 6–1
Win	15–8	Nov 2018	Canberra International, Australia (2)	60,000	Hard	(Australia) Arina Rodionova	(Australia) Naiktha Bains (Australia) Destanee Aiava	6–7^{(5)}, 6–3, [10–7]
Win	16–8	Jan 2019	Burnie International, Australia	W60	Hard	(Australia) Arina Rodionova	(Russia) Irina Khromacheva (Belgium) Maryna Zanevska	6–4, 6–3
Loss	16–9	Mar 2019	ITF Canberra, Australia	W25	Clay	(Australia) Destanee Aiava	(Australia) Naiktha Bains (Slovakia) Tereza Mihalíková	6–4, 2–6, [4–10]
Loss	16–10	Jun 2019	Ilkley Trophy, United Kingdom	W100	Grass	(Australia) Arina Rodionova	(Brazil) Beatriz Haddad Maia (Brazil) Luisa Stefani	4–6, 7–6^{(5)}, [4–10]
Win	17–10	Jan 2020	Burnie International, Australia (2)	W60	Hard	(Australia) Storm Sanders	(United States) Desirae Krawczyk (United States) Asia Muhammad	6–3, 6–2
Win	18–10	Mar 2022	ITF Bendigo, Australia	W25	Hard	(Australia) Jaimee Fourlis	(Australia) Gabriella Da Silva-Fick (Australia) Alana Parnaby	6–1, 6–1
Win	19–10	May 2023	ITF Platja d'Aro, Spain	W25	Clay	(United States) Ashley Lahey	(Portugal) Francisca Jorge (Portugal) Matilde Jorge	6–3, 3–6, [12–10]
