= 2022 Abierto Zapopan – Singles =

Singles
- 2022 Abierto Zapopan

Final
- Champion: (United States) Sloane Stephens
- Runner-up: (Czech Republic) Marie Bouzková
- Score: 7–5, 1–6, 6–2

Details
- Draw: 32
- Seeds: 8

Events
Singles	Doubles
- Abierto Zapopan

Sloane Stephens defeated Marie Bouzková in the final, 7–5, 1–6, 6–2, to win the singles title at the 2022 Abierto Zapopan. It marked the first final and title for Stephens since 2018.

Sara Sorribes Tormo was the defending champion, but she lost in the quarterfinals to Bouzková.

== Seeds ==
1. (United Kingdom) Emma Raducanu (first round, retired)
2. (United States) Madison Keys (first round)
3. (Spain) Sara Sorribes Tormo (quarterfinals)
4. (Colombia) Camila Osorio (quarterfinals)
5. (Spain) Nuria Párrizas Díaz (first round)
6. (United States) Sloane Stephens (champion)
7. (Japan) Misaki Doi (first round)
8. (China) Zheng Qinwen (first round)

== Draw ==
Key

- Q = Qualifier
- WC = Wild card
- LL = Lucky loser
- Alt = Alternate
- ITF = ITF entry
- PR = Protected ranking
- SR = Special ranking
- SE = Special exempt
- JE = Junior exempt
- JR = Junior Accelerator Programme entrant
- CO = College Accelerator Programme entrant
- NG = Next Gen Accelerator Program entrant
- w/o = Walkover
- r = Retired
- d = Defaulted

=== Finals ===
Semifinals
6	(United States) Sloane Stephens	3	7	0
(Russia) Anna Kalinskaya	6	5	0^{r}
(Czech Republic) Marie Bouzková	6	6
(China) Wang Qiang	3	3

Final
6	(United States) Sloane Stephens	7	1	6
(Czech Republic) Marie Bouzková	5	6	2

=== Top half ===
First round
1	(United Kingdom) E Raducanu	7	6^{4}	3^{r}
PR	(Australia) D Saville	5	7^{7}	4
Q	(United States) C Dolehide	4	6	6
(China) L Zhu	6	3	4
Q	(Spain) R Masarova	5	5
(France) C Paquet	7	7
Q	(Czech Republic) B Fruhvirtová	2	2
6	(United States) S Stephens	6	6
4	(Colombia) C Osorio	6	6
(Bulgaria) V Tomova	4	3
Q	(United States) H Baptiste	6	6
Q	(Slovakia) V Kužmová	3	3
(Hungary) P Udvardy	4	6	1
(China) Xin Wang	6	4	6
(Russia) A Kalinskaya	6	2	6
8	(China) Q Zheng	3	6	2

Second round
PR	(Australia) D Saville	6	6
Q	(United States) C Dolehide	1	3
(France) C Paquet	5	4
6	(United States) S Stephens	7	6
4	(Colombia) C Osorio	1	6	6
Q	(United States) H Baptiste	6	3	3
(China) Xin Wang	4	6	4
(Russia) A Kalinskaya	6	0	6

Quarterfinals
PR	(Australia) D Saville	6	3	2
6	(United States) S Stephens	4	6	6
4	(Colombia) C Osorio	4	1
(Russia) A Kalinskaya	6	6

Semifinals
6	(United States) S Stephens	3	7	0
(Russia) A Kalinskaya	6	5	0^{r}

=== Bottom half ===
First round
7	(Japan) M Doi	6	5	4
(Czech Republic) M Bouzková	4	7	6
WC	(United States) C McNally	7^{7}	3	3
Q	(Italy) L Bronzetti	6^{5}	6	6
(Poland) M Fręch	7^{7}	4	6
WC	(Mexico) R Zarazúa	6^{5}	6	4
WC	(United States) K Volynets	4	1
3	(Spain) S Sorribes Tormo	6	6
5	(Spain) N Párrizas Díaz	1	4
(Slovakia) AK Schmiedlová	6	6
(Russia) A Potapova	6	2
(Ukraine) L Tsurenko	4	2^{r}
(China) Q Wang	6	6
(United States) L Davis	2	1
(France) H Tan	6	1	6
2	(United States) M Keys	4	6	1

Second round
(Czech Republic) M Bouzková	7^{7}	6
Q	(Italy) L Bronzetti	6^{2}	2
(Poland) M Fręch	0	2
3	(Spain) S Sorribes Tormo	6	6
(Slovakia) AK Schmiedlová	6	7^{7}
(Russia) A Potapova	3	6^{5}
(China) Q Wang	6	6
(France) H Tan	4	2

Quarterfinals
(Czech Republic) M Bouzková	6	6
3	(Spain) S Sorribes Tormo	4	1
(Slovakia) AK Schmiedlová	2	3
(China) Q Wang	6	6

Semifinals
(Czech Republic) M Bouzková	6	6
(China) Q Wang	3	3

== Qualifying ==
=== Seeds ===
1. (Hungary) Dalma Gálfi (qualifying competition)
2. (Italy) Lucia Bronzetti (qualified)
3. (United States) Hailey Baptiste (qualified)
4. (Slovakia) Viktória Kužmová (qualified)
5. (Spain) Rebeka Masarova (qualified)
6. (Italy) Sara Errani (first round)
7. (United States) Christina McHale (first round)
8. (China) Yuan Yue (first round)
9. (Belarus) Olga Govortsova (first round)
10. (Japan) Nao Hibino (first round)
11. (Australia) Storm Sanders (qualifying competition)
12. (United States) Robin Anderson (first round)

=== Qualifiers ===
1. (United States) Caroline Dolehide
2. (Italy) Lucia Bronzetti
3. (United States) Hailey Baptiste
4. (Slovakia) Viktória Kužmová
5. (Spain) Rebeka Masarova
6. (Czech Republic) Brenda Fruhvirtová

=== Qualifying draw ===
==== First qualifier ====
First round
1	(Hungary) Dalma Gálfi	6	6
(Argentina) Paula Ormaechea	4	2
(United States) Caroline Dolehide	6	6
10	(Japan) Nao Hibino	0	4

Qualifying competition
1	(Hungary) Dalma Gálfi	6^{3}	4
(United States) Caroline Dolehide	7^{7}	6

==== Second qualifier ====
First round
2	(Italy) Lucia Bronzetti	6	6
Alt	(United States) Alycia Parks	2	4
WC	(Australia) Seone Mendez	6	6
9	(Belarus) Olga Govortsova	4	2

Qualifying competition
2	(Italy) Lucia Bronzetti	3	6	6
WC	(Australia) Seone Mendez	6	2	3

==== Third qualifier ====
First round
3	(United States) Hailey Baptiste	6	6
WC	(Mexico) Marcela Zacarías	1	3
(Andorra) Victoria Jiménez Kasintseva	6	6
12	(United States) Robin Anderson	3	2

Qualifying competition
3	(United States) Hailey Baptiste	6	6
(Andorra) Victoria Jiménez Kasintseva	3	4

==== Fourth qualifier ====
First round
4	(Slovakia) Viktória Kužmová	6	6
(Greece) Despina Papamichail	4	3
WC	(Mexico) Fernanda Contreras	6	6
8	(China) Yuan Yue	1	1

Qualifying competition
4	(Slovakia) Viktória Kužmová	7^{7}	5	6
WC	(Mexico) Fernanda Contreras	6^{2}	7	3

==== Fifth qualifier ====
First round
5	(Spain) Rebeka Masarova	6^{4}	6	6
(United States) Usue Maitane Arconada	7^{7}	4	4
(Brazil) Laura Pigossi	3	3
11	(Australia) Storm Sanders	6	6

Qualifying competition
5	(Spain) Rebeka Masarova	6	7^{8}
11	(Australia) Storm Sanders	3	6^{6}

==== Sixth qualifier ====
First round
6	(Italy) Sara Errani	6^{2}	6	2
WC	(Czech Republic) Brenda Fruhvirtová	7^{7}	3	6
(Switzerland) Leonie Küng	1	7	6
7	(United States) Christina McHale	6	5	2

Qualifying competition
WC	(Czech Republic) Brenda Fruhvirtová	6	6
(Switzerland) Leonie Küng	2	1
