= 2025 Guadalajara 125 Open =

- Date: 1–6 September
- Edition: 5th
- Category: WTA 125
- Draw: 32S / 8D
- Prize money: $115,000
- Surface: Hard
- Location: Guadalajara, Mexico
- Venue: Panamerican Tennis Center

Champions

Singles
- (Philippines) Alexandra Eala

Doubles
- Maria Kozyreva / Iryna Shymanovich
- Abierto Zapopan

The 2025 Guadalajara 125 Open was a professional tennis tournament played on outdoor hardcourts. It was the 5th edition of the tournament and part of the 2025 WTA 125 tournaments. It took place in Guadalajara, Mexico from 2 to 7 September 2025.

== Champions ==
=== Singles ===
- (Philippines) Alexandra Eala def. (Hungary) Panna Udvardy 1–6 7–5 6–3

=== Doubles ===
- Maria Kozyreva / Iryna Shymanovich def. Irina Khromacheva / Kamilla Rakhimova 6–3, 6–4

== Singles main draw entrants ==
=== Seeds ===
Country	Player	Rank¹	Seed
	Kamilla Rakhimova	65	1
PHI	Alexandra Eala	75	2
COL	Emiliana Arango	84	3
GBR	Francesca Jones	89	4
~~FRA~~	~~Elsa Jacquemot~~	~~91~~	~~5~~
CAN	Rebecca Marino	117	6
POL	Katarzyna Kawa	118	7
AUS	Olivia Gadecki	121	8

¹ Rankings are as of 25 August 2025.

=== Other entrants ===
The following players received wildcards into the singles main draw:

- (Czech Republic) Nikola Bartůňková
- (Philippines) Alexandra Eala
- Alisa Oktiabreva
- (United States) Alana Smith

The following player received entry using a protected ranking into the singles main draw:

- (United States) Kayla Day

The following players received entry from the qualifying draw:

- Maria Kozyreva
- (Finland) Anastasia Kulikova
- (United States) Varvara Lepchenko
- (Mexico) Victoria Rodríguez

The following players received entry as lucky losers:

- (Mexico) Jéssica Hinojosa Gómez
- (Mexico) Natalia Sousa Salazar

=== Withdrawals ===
- (Australia) Destanee Aiava → replaced by (Mexico) Ana Sofia Sánchez
- (United States) Louisa Chirico → replaced by (United States) Anna Rogers
- (Japan) Aoi Ito → replaced by (Italy) Martina Trevisan
- (France) Elsa Jacquemot → replaced by (Mexico) Jéssica Hinojosa Gómez (LL)
- (United States) Iva Jovic → replaced by (Mexico) Natalia Sousa Salazar (LL)
- (United Kingdom) Sonay Kartal → replaced by (United States) Emina Bektas
- (United States) Alycia Parks → replaced by (Italy) Nicole Fossa Huergo
- (United States) Bernarda Pera → replaced by (United States) Kayla Day
- (Japan) Ena Shibahara → replaced by (France) Amandine Hesse
- (Turkey) Zeynep Sönmez → replaced by Elena Pridankina
- (Czech Republic) Darja Vidmanová → replaced by Iryna Shymanovich
- (United Kingdom) Heather Watson → replaced by (Brazil) Laura Pigossi

== Doubles main draw entrants ==
=== Seeds ===
Country	Player	Country	Player	Rank^{1}	Seed
	Irina Khromacheva		Kamilla Rakhimova	67	1
POL	Katarzyna Piter	CHN	Tang Qianhui	121	2

¹ Rankings are as of 25 August 2025.

=== Other entrants ===
The following pair received a wildcard into the doubles main draw:

- (Czech Republic) Nikola Bartůňková / (Mexico) Natalia Sousa Salazar
