= Guadalajara 125 Open =

2019 WTA tennis tournament in Mexico

WTA 125
- Event name: Guadalajara 125 Open (2024-2025); Abierto Zapopan (2019-2022)
- Tour: WTA Tour
- Founded: 2019
- Abolished: 2025
- Location: Zapopan, Jalisco, Mexico
- Venue: Panamerican Tennis Center
- Category: WTA 125
- Surface: Hard - outdoors
- Draw: 32S / 8D
- Prize money: US$ 115,000 (2025)

Current champions (2025)
- Singles: (Philippines) Alexandra Eala
- Doubles: Maria Kozyreva; Iryna Shymanovich

The Guadalajara 125 Open (Spanish: Torneo de Guadalajara), was a WTA 125-level professional women's tennis tournament that took place in Zapopan, Mexico (Guadalajara metro area) on hardcourts in the early part of September. Its inaugural edition was in 2019 but the 2020 edition was cancelled due to the COVID-19 pandemic. In 2021 and 2022 the event gained temporary WTA 250 status, before returning to the WTA 125 level in 2024 and 2025. It moved from a late winter to September timeslot in 2024 and was played at the Panamerican Tennis Center in the city of Zapopan. The tournament was previously called the Abierto Zapopan, a name still commonly used to describe the event.

== Results ==
=== Singles ===
| Year | Champion | Runner-up | Score |
|---|---|---|---|
↓ WTA 125 event ↓
| 2019 | (Russia) Veronika Kudermetova | (Czech Republic) Marie Bouzková | 6–2, 6–0 |
| 2020 | Cancelled due to the COVID-19 pandemic | | |
↓ WTA 250 event ↓
| 2021 | (Spain) Sara Sorribes Tormo | (Canada) Eugenie Bouchard | 6–2, 7–5 |
| 2022 | (United States) Sloane Stephens | (Czech Republic) Marie Bouzková | 7–5, 1–6, 6–2 |
| 2023 | Not held | | |
↓ WTA 125 event ↓
| 2024 | Kamilla Rakhimova | (Germany) Tatjana Maria | 6–3, 6–7^{(5–7)}, 6–3 |
| 2025 | (Philippines) Alexandra Eala | (Hungary) Panna Udvardy | 1–6, 7–5, 6–3 |
| 2026 | Not held | | |

=== Doubles ===
| Year | Champions | Runners-up | Score |
|---|---|---|---|
↓ WTA 125 event ↓
| 2019 | (United States) Maria Sanchez (Hungary) Fanny Stollár | (Sweden) Cornelia Lister (Czech Republic) Renata Voráčová | 7–5, 6–1 |
| 2020 | Cancelled due to the COVID-19 pandemic | | |
↓ WTA 250 event ↓
| 2021 | (Australia) Ellen Perez (Australia) Astra Sharma | (United States) Desirae Krawczyk (Mexico) Giuliana Olmos | 6–4, 6–4 |
| 2022 | (United States) Kaitlyn Christian (Belarus) Lidziya Marozava | (China) Wang Xinyu (China) Zhu Lin | 7–5, 6–3 |
| 2023 | Not held | | |
↓ WTA 125 event ↓
| 2024 | (Poland) Katarzyna Piter (Hungary) Fanny Stollár (2) | (Italy) Angelica Moratelli (United States) Sabrina Santamaria | 6–4, 7–5 |
| 2025 | Maria Kozyreva; Iryna Shymanovich | Irina Khromacheva; Kamilla Rakhimova | 6–3, 6–4 |
| 2026 | Not held | | |
